= KNMF =

Radio station in Cedar Park, Texas

- Cedar Park, Texas; United States
- Broadcast area: Greater Austin
- Frequency: 93.3 MHz (HD Radio)
- Branding: Poder 93.3

Programming
- Format: Regional Mexican

Ownership
- Owner: Norsan Media; (Norsan Media Group, LLC)
- Sister stations: KTAE; KOKE-FM; KTXX-FM

History
- First air date: August 1961
- Former call signs: KLEN-FM (1961–1973); KIXS-FM (1973–1986); KBTS-FM (1986–1992); KMXX (1992–1994); KHHT (1994–1996); KAJZ (1996–1998); KLNC (1998–2001); KXMG (2001–2003); KDHT (2003–2009); KGSR (2009–2026)

Technical information
- Licensing authority: FCC
- Facility ID: 23604
- Class: C
- ERP: 100,000 watts
- HAAT: 587 meters (1,926 ft)
- Transmitter coordinates: 30°43′34.0″N 97°59′24.3″W

Links
- Public license information: Public file; LMS
- Website: poderaustin.com

KNMF (93.3 FM, "Poder 93.3") is a radio station licensed to Cedar Park, Texas, United States, and serving the Greater Austin area. Owned by Norsan Media Group, it broadcasts a regional Mexican music format. KNMF's studios and offices are located along Loop 360 in Southwest Austin. Its transmitter site is located off Route 206 in Bertram.

== History ==
=== KLEN-FM and KIXS-FM ===
KNMF signed on in August 1961, as KLEN-FM, owned by Clear Channel Campuses and Highlite Broadcasting. Its original city of license was Killeen, Texas, serving the Killeen-Fort Hood area. KLEN-FM was co-owned with KLEN-AM (was KRMY until 2023). Since KLEN-AM was a daytime-only station, KLEN-FM allowed listeners to hear the station at night after the AM transmitter had signed off.

In 1973, the stations were acquired by Accent Radio, which switched them to a Top 40 format, and changed the call signs to KIXS and KIXS-FM in June 1973. In 1986, the two stations were acquired by Duffy Broadcasting, which asked the FCC for a major power increase for the FM station.

=== Top 40 and Smooth Jazz ===
On October 2, 1986, KIXS-FM upgraded its signal to 100,000 watts, allowing it to move in to the more lucrative Austin radio market while still covering Killeen. It would then relaunch its Top 40 format with the new call sign KBTS, "B93", in December, and was an immediate success. However, four years later, B93 came into common ownership with competing top 40 station KHFI, with KBTS flipping to hot adult contemporary as KMXX ("Mix 93.3"). Right before the switch in December 1991, an Urban/Rhythmic format was tried until "B93" ceased to exist in February 1992. Stunting went on for a few months after, until KMXX went on the air in May 1992.

In 1993, the station was bought by LBJ, Inc. for $2.5 million. The company was owned by the family of former President Lyndon Baines Johnson and also owned KLBJ (AM) and KLBJ-FM. Shortly after the sale, the station flipped to an All-1970s hits format as KHHT. That was followed in 1996 by KAJZ, playing smooth jazz. Two years later, the station flipped to country music as KLNC.

=== Rhythmic KXMG and KDHT ===
On August 3, 2001, the station tried to appeal to Austin's growing Hispanic community with a dance format as KXMG, known as Mega 93.3. It was also at this time that the city of license changed to Cedar Park. "Mega 93.3 KXMG Austin Dance 8 9 01 Unscoped". The stations were part of a larger cluster co-owned by Sinclair Telecable Inc. (d/b/a Sinclair Communications; unrelated to television broadcaster Sinclair Broadcast Group, which owns CBS station KEYE), and LBJ Holdings Co. (owned by Luci Baines Johnson, the daughter of former President Lyndon B. Johnson and Lady Bird Johnson). In 2003, the Indianapolis-based Emmis Communications acquired the LBJ Holdings controlling stake in the stations. KXMG changed to a hip hop-leaning rhythmic contemporary format. Call letters were updated to KDHT to reflect the new brand Hot 93.3.

=== Adult Alternative KGSR ===
On November 17, 2009, KDHT began stunting, leading to speculation that it would flip to a talk radio format. However, on November 20, Emmis revealed that the adult album alternative format heard on KGSR in Bastrop would move to the more powerful signal on 93.3. The two stations simulcast for a 10-day period until December 1, when KGSR's former 107.1 FM signal switched to a regional Mexican format as KLZT.

On December 13, 2010, KGSR began simulcasting on FM translator K274AX (102.7 FM). This lasted until October 20, 2011, when K274AX switched to a comedy radio format, relaying KGSR-HD3. The comedy format proved to be quite successful in the Austin Arbitron ratings, peaking with a 3.8 share. For a time, it was believed to be the highest-rated HD Radio-fed FM translator station in the United States.

On May 30, 2013, K274AX began relaying KLZT-HD2's Spanish-language hits format as Latino 102.7.

=== Austin City Limits Radio ===
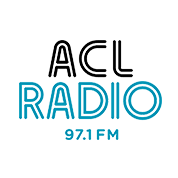
Austin City Limits Radio logo.

On September 5, 2018, KGSR began promoting a major announcement to come at 5:00 pm the following day. At the same time, Sinclair closed on its purchase of translator 97.1 K246BD and began simulcasting KGSR.

After playing "Changes" by David Bowie, the two stations re-launched as Austin City Limits Radio, co-branded with the Austin City Limits television series and music festival under a multi-year licensing agreement. The station shifted to an "aesthetic" focus on musicians associated with the television series and festival rather than falling within a strictly defined format, with a broad mix of music that can range from Americana and country music, to alternative and classic rock, as well as contemporary hip-hop music and world music. The first song played under the new branding was Willie Nelson's recording of "Whiskey River"—the first song to be performed on Austin City Limits.

Tom Gimbel, general manager of the Austin City Limits program, stated that the new format reflected the listening habits associated with online music streaming platforms, explaining that "people are not tying themselves to Triple A or hip-hop or rock or country. They're all over the map. I think we're going to see a lot of people in Austin listening the same way."

=== Adult contemporary: Star, Austin, and Lucy ===
On March 7, 2019, KGSR began running promos directing Austin City Limits Radio listeners to the 97.1 signal. The next day, KGSR flipped to soft AC as Star 93.3, launching with 9,300 songs in a row. The station primarily targeted women in the 35–54 age demographic, and carried the syndicated Delilah in evenings. The previous Austin City Limits Radio format continued to air on KGSR-HD2 and the 97.1 translator.

In June 2019, Emmis announced that it would sell its stake in the Austin joint venture to Sinclair for $39.3 million. Sinclair will operate the stations under the licensee Waterloo Media.

On February 14, 2020, the station segued back to hot AC while maintaining the Star 93.3 branding, but with the new slogan "Nothing but the Hits". On September 18, 2020, KGSR flipped back to contemporary hit radio as 93.3 Austin, with the first song being "WAP" by Cardi B featuring Megan Thee Stallion. After recording only a 1.0 share in Nielsen Audio ratings during its first month on-air, the station segued back to hot AC again on November 18, maintaining the existing 93.3 Austin branding and airstaff.

Logo as "Lucy", 2021-23

On January 4, 2021, KGSR rebranded once more to Lucy 93.3, maintaining the hot AC format. The new brand was a nod to Luci Baines Johnson, daughter of former President Lyndon B. Johnson and Lady Bird Johnson, whose family owned the group of stations that would later include KGSR. Lucy was positioned as a female counterpart to sister adult hits station KBPA (Bob FM). The move marked KGSR's fourth change in branding or format in just shy of a year.

On August 21, 2021, KGSR added Elvis Duran and the Morning Show. Duran was part of the station in the early 1990s (as Top 40/CHR KBTS) as both the station's morning show host and program director.

=== Latino 93.3 ===
On July 12, 2023, at 9:33 am, KGSR shifted to a Spanish-language CHR format focused on bachata, Latin pop, reggaeton, and tropical music as Latino 93.3, reviving a format heard on K274AX/KLZT-HD2 from 2013 to 2021, then briefly again from January to June 2022.

=== Vibe 93.3 ===
On August 30, 2024, KGSR's Spanish CHR format moved to translator K246BD (97.1 FM) and KGSR-HD4 as Latino 97.1, displacing the "Austin City Limits" branding and AAA format, which moved online. Concurrently, KGSR flipped to rhythmic adult contemporary, branded as Vibe 93.3. In October 2024, the Latino 97.1 subchannel flipped to a mix of Latin pop and English-language adult contemporary in the vein of WMIA-FM; In February 2025, the station reverted to its previous Spanish CHR format.

=== Sale to Norsan Media ===
On June 17, 2026, it was announced that Norsan Media would acquire KGSR. The sale closed on September 16, 2026 and KGSR changed formats to regional Mexican as "Poder 93.3" the same day. The call letters were changed to KNMF on September 21, 2026.

=== Daryl O'Neal's Recharge Media granted the KGSR FM Call letters ===
Following the completion of the Norsan transaction and the subsequent call letter change to KNMF, the KGSR-FM call letters were returned to the FCC’s available call sign database.

Recharge Media PBC, owner of Crush FM in the Texas Wine Country, operating on KMSN-FM Mason and K267AO Fredericksburg, applied for and was awarded the KGSR-FM call letters in October 2026.

The call letters were assigned to the former KCRQ-FM in Junction, Texas, for which Recharge Media holds an FCC construction permit to upgrade the station’s signal and relocate its city of license to Cherry Spring, Texas. The station is now designated KGSR-FM, Cherry Spring, Texas. Recharge manages Jack FM in Austin, KGID in Giddings and supports the Sun Radio Foundation (501C3) as a public benefit corporation.
