= Sinclair Telecable =

American family-owned radio broadcasting company

Sinclair Telecable, Inc.
- Trade name: Sinclair Communications
- Type: Private
- Founded: 1966; 60 years ago
- Founder: John L. Sinclair
- Headquarters: Norfolk, Virginia, United States
- Owner: Sinclair family
- Website: sinclairstations.com

Sinclair Telecable, Inc. (d/b/a Sinclair Communications) is an American family-owned radio broadcasting company based in Norfolk, Virginia, United States.

As of 2026, the company owns ten radio stations in Virginia and Texas (which the Texas stations operating under the name Waterloo Media).

== History ==
The company was founded in 1966 by John L. Sinclair (1919–2007) and would remained as CEO until he retired in 2005. Later on, his son Bob Sinclair, Sr. and his future wife Lisa Sinclair, joined the company, who later helped the company bein to grow, with the acquisition of WHNE (now WGPL).

In 1984, Sinclair Telecable was granted a construction permit that would expand into the Richmond–Petersburg, Virginia area, signing on as WPUF (now WCDX) in 1985.

In September 1988, Sinclair Telecable acquired the remaining 51% stake of licensee RLS Radio, Inc. (who owned a 49% stake beforehand) from Ronayne Hope at the price of $51,000 for the construction permit for KIOV (now KINE-FM) in Honolulu, Hawaii.

In 1992, Sinclair Telecable acquired WGCV and WPLZ-FM in the Richmond–Petersburg area from Paco-Jon Broadcasting for $1.4 million.

In August 1993, Sinclair Telecable acquired WMYA in Cape Charles, Virginia (now in Exmore) from Willis Broadcasting Corporation for $1.3 million.

In October 1993, RLS Radio sold KINE-FM to KINE Broadcasting Company Inc., a subsidiary of KCCN Broadcasting Company Inc. for $800,000.

In March 1995, Sinclair Telecable entered the Austin, Texas area by acquiring two stations: KOKE from Radio Lee County for $2.73 million, and KGSR (now KLZT) from Beasley Broadcast Group for $5.3 million.

In May 1996, Sinclair Telecable acquired WKOC in Norfolk and WTAR in Chesapeake from Benchmark Communications for $8.1 million.

In July 1996, Sinclair Telecable acquired WSMJ in Richmond from Barbara B. Benns for $600,000.

In August 1997, it was announced that Sinclair Telecable and LBJ Broadcasting Company (a broadcasting company founded by former first lady Lady Bird Johnson) would merge to form LBJS Broadcasting Company, L.P. in the Austin area. The merger would cost $80 million and include Sinclair's two stations and LBJ's three stations: KAJZ, KLBJ, and KLBJ-FM. LBJ would later sell its 50.1% stake to Emmis Corporation in March 2003 and was changed to form Emmis Austin Radio Broadcasting Co., L.P.

In March 1999, Sinclair Telecable announced that it would sell its Richmond cluster to Radio One, Inc. for $34 million.

In April 2001, LBJS Broadcasting acquired KEYI-FM in Austin for $22.5 million. Also in the same month, Sinclair Telecable acquired three stations in the Santa Rosa, California area for $11.1 million: KSXY from Deas Communications Inc., KGRP and KRSH from Independent Broadcasting Corp. In the same year, Lisa became the general manager of the Norfolk radio stations until she retired in 2017.

In June 2019, it was announced by Emmis that they would sell its remaining stake of Emmis Austin Radio to Sinclair Telecable for $39.3 million, giving them full ownership. The company was also renamed to Waterloo Media to avoid confusion with the Sinclair Broadcast Group (which owns CBS affiliate KEYE-TV in Austin). One month later in August, Sinclair Telecable sold five wireless towers in Virginia to CTI Towers.

In February 2021, Sinclair Telecable sold its Santa Rosa cluster to B.C. Radio LLC for $3.3 millon.

In June 2026, Waterloo Media agreed to sell the modern KGSR to Norsan Media for 3.5 million.

== Radio stations ==
=== Current stations ===
==== Austin, Texas (operated under the name Waterloo Media) ====
- KBPA 103.5 FM – Adult hits
- KLBJ 590 AM – News/talk
- KLBJ-FM 93.7 FM – Mainstream rock
- KLZT 107.1 FM – Regional Mexican
- KROX-FM 101.5 FM – Alternative rock

==== Hampton Roads, Virginia ====
- WNIS 790 AM – Talk radio
- WNOB 93.7 FM – Adult hits
- WROX-FM 96.1 FM – Alternative rock
- WTAR 850 AM – Talk radio
- WUSH 106.1 FM – Country

=== Former stations ===
==== Santa Rosa, California ====
- KRSH 95.9 FM – Adult album alternative
- KSXY 100.9 FM – Alternative rock (former format)
- KXTS 98.7 FM – Regional Mexican

==== Honolulu, Hawaii ====
- KINE-FM 105.1 FM – Hawaiian adult contemporary

==== Austin, Texas (under the name Waterloo Media) ====
- KGSR 93.3 FM – Rhythmic adult contemporary (former format)

==== Richmond, Virginia ====
- WCDX 92.1 FM – Urban contemporary
- WGCV 1240 AM – Gospel (former format)
- WPLZ-FM 99.3 FM – Urban oldies
- WJRV 101.1 FM – Smooth jazz (former frequency/format)
