= Pushmonkey =

US musical group

- Also known as: Mad Hatter, Hatter, Billy Pilgrim
- Origin: Austin, Texas, U.S.
- Genres: Hard rock, post-grunge, nu metal
- Years active: 1994–2005
- Labels: Sector 2 Records; Arista Records; Trespass Records
- Members: Tony Park; Darwin Keys; Will Hoffman; Pat Fogarty; Howie Behrens

Pushmonkey is an American hard rock band from Austin, Texas, United States. Originally known as Billy Pilgrim, they first changed their name to Mad Hatter and later to just Hatter. The band experienced minor radio success with the song "Handslide" from their self-titled album. They were featured in season 7 of Melrose Place. They appeared on Ozzfest in 1999 in support of the album, as well as Woodstock '99. In 2007, the band won the first FameCast.com Battle of the Bands contest. Music video “Caught My Mind” featured in season 2 episode 7 of Sopranos, “D-girl.”

== Members ==
=== Current ===
- Tony Park – lead vocals/trumpet
- Darwin Keys – drums/vocal (1994–present)
- Will Hoffman – guitar/vocals
- Pat Fogarty – bass/vocals
- Howie Behrens – guitar/vocals

=== Former ===
- Rico Ybarra – drums/vocals (formation - 1994)

== Discography ==
=== Studio albums ===
Year	Title	Label
1994	Maize	Sector 2
1998	Pushmonkey	Arista
2001	El Bitché	Trespass
2005	Year of the Monkey	Trespass

=== EPs/singles/promos ===
Year	Title	Tracks	Label
1996	Pushmonkey EP	1. "Loner" (Pushmonkey) – 4:22 *	Lone Wolf
1996	Pushmonkey EP	2. "Caught My Mind" (Pushmonkey) – 3:57 *	Lone Wolf
1996	Pushmonkey EP	3. "No Dumb Wrong" (Pushmonkey) – 3:52	Lone Wolf
1996	Pushmonkey EP	4. "Sweet Caribbean Bungalow" live (Pushmonkey) – 6:13 *	Lone Wolf
1996	Pushmonkey EP	5. "Crush It" (Pushmonkey) – 4:59	Lone Wolf
1999	Lefty promo single	1. "Lefty" remix (Pushmonkey) – 3:15 *	Arista
1999	Lefty promo single	2. Call Out Hook – 0:10	Arista
1999	Caught My Mind promo single	1. "Caught My Mind" (Pushmonkey) – 3:43	Arista
1999	Handslide promo single	1. "Handslide" (Pushmonkey) – 3:24	Arista
1999	Professional Nympho Music promo EP	1. "Caught My Mind" edit (Pushmonkey) – 3:44 *	Arista
1999	Professional Nympho Music promo EP	2. "No Dumb Wrong" live (Pushmonkey) – 4:03 *	Arista
1999	Professional Nympho Music promo EP	3. "I Ate Up a Diamond" Arista version (Pushmonkey) – 4:09 *	Arista
1999	Professional Nympho Music promo EP	4. "Handslide" acoustic version (Pushmonkey) – 3:16 *	Arista
1999	Professional Nympho Music promo EP	5. "Now" live (Pushmonkey) – 5:23 *	Arista

=== Non-album tracks ===
Year	Track	Source
1996	"Sweet Caribbean Bungalow" live (Behrens, Fogarty, Ybarra, Hoffman, Park) – 6:02 *	From the KLBJ Local Licks Live '95 album (Same as on Pushmonkey EP on Lone Wolf above)
1999	"Now" live (Behrens, Fogarty, Keys, Hoffman, Park) – 5:19 *	From the KLBJ Local Licks Live '98 album
1999	"Auld Lang Syne" (Traditional) – 2:58 *	From the KLBJ Local Licks: Yule Rock! album
2001	"Lefty" live (Pushmonkey) – 3:10	From KLBJ's Dudley & Bob Show's Damn It's Early album
2002	"Myself" live (Behrens, Fogarty, Keys, Hoffman, Park) – 4:07	From the KLBJ Local Licks Live 13 album
	"High Society" (The Judy's) – 1:58 *	From The Judy's tribute album, unreleased as of 2006

==== Yellow demo ("older than dirt") ====
- "Maize" (Pushmonkey) – 5:01
- "Neiderwald" (Pushmonkey) – 3:17

==== El Bitché sessions ====
- "Chained Man" demo (Pushmonkey) – 3:01
- "Sunny Days" demo (Pushmonkey) – 3:30

==== Other studio tracks ====
- "Falling Out of Place" demo (Pushmonkey) – 3:30
- "Lefty" acoustic version (Pushmonkey) – 3:08
- "Number One" heavy demo version (Pushmonkey) – 4:33
- "Pat's a M.F." (Pushmonkey) – 1:03 (No longer available)
- "Sorry" demo (Pushmonkey) – 3:20
- "When You Were Mine" (Prince) – 4:54

==== Live tracks ====
- "Ashtray Red" live at The Steamboat, Austin, Texas (Pushmonkey) – 3:34
- "Falling Out of Place" live at The Steamboat, Austin, Texas (Pushmonkey) – 3:29
- "Limitless" live at The Steamboat, Austin, Texas, September 2002 (Pushmonkey) – 6:58
- "Sorry" live at The Steamboat, Austin, Texas (Pushmonkey) – 3:12

== See also ==
- Music of Austin
