= KTBC =

KTBC may refer to:

- KTBC (TV), the Fox owned-and-operated station for Austin, Texas
- KLBJ (AM), a radio station in Austin, Texas, which previously held the KTBC call sign
- KLBJ-FM, a radio station in Austin Texas, which previously held the KTBC-FM call sign
