= Damn It's 2 Early =

Live album by Various Artists
- Released: 2003
- Genre: Rock/blues/folk
- Length: 77:49
- Label: KLBJ

The Dudley & Bob Show chronology
Damn It's Early (2001)	Damn It's 2 Early (2003)

KLBJ chronology
Local Licks Live 13 (2002)	Damn It's 2 Early (2003)

Professional ratings
Review scores
Source	Rating
Austin Chronicle	2.5/4

Damn It's 2 Early is the second CD of live music recorded on The Dudley & Bob Show released by the show and radio station KLBJ.

== Track listing ==
1. Steve Poltz: "Sugar Boogers (Answering Machine Song)" (Poltz) – 0:45
2. Carolyn Wonderland: "Judgement Day Blues" (Brown) – 3:11
3. They Might Be Giants: "Boss of Me" (They Might Be Giants) – 0:56
4. Rachel Loy: "The Same Man" (Loy) – 2:35
5. Brian Van Der Ark: "Photograph" (Willis) – 2:31
6. Wideawake: "Bigger Than Ourselves" (Wideawake) – 3:15
7. Jane Bond: "Sure Would Go Good" (Walker) – 2:14
8. Jimmy Lafave: "Never Is a Moment" (Lafave) – 4:14
9. Hayseed Dixie: "Poop in a Jar" (Wheeler) – 2:23
10. Li'l Cap'n Travis: "Lonesome and Losin'" (Li'l Cap'n Travis) – 4:42
11. Reckless Kelly: "Nobody's Girl" (Braun, Braun) – 2:57
12. Skunkweed: "Open Minded Redneck" (Waddy, Brown) – 3:10
13. Steven Fromholz: "I Game Her a Ring" (Fromholz) – 2:22
14. Bruce Robison: "What Would Willie Do" (Robison) – 4:23
15. Ray Wylie Hubbard: "Screw You We're From Texas" (Hubbard) – 3:21
16. Ruthie Foster: "Jordan" (Traditional) – 3:14
17. Terri Hendrix with Lloyd Maines: "Wallet" (Hendrix) – 2:36
18. Monte Montgomery: "Took Too Long" (Montgomery) – 4:12
19. Wendy Colonna: "M'aider" (Colonna) – 3:38
20. Warren Haynes: "Beautifully Broken" (Haynes, Louis) – 3:37
21. Steve Poltz: "You Were Meant for Me" Viva Las Vegas version (Poltz, Jewel) – 8:56
22. The Gourds: "Gin and Juice" (Casey, Young, Finch, Broadus) – 6:06
23. Bob Schneider: "If I Only Had a Brain" (Arlen, Harburg) – 2:22
