= Maize (album) =

Studio album by Pushmonkey
- Released: June 28, 1994
- Genre: [[Alternative rock], funk metal
- Length: 53:52
- Label: Sector 2

Pushmonkey chronology
Maize (1994)	Pushmonkey (1998)

Alternate album covers
- Remastered Trespass reissue cover (2002)

Maize is the first studio album by the American band Pushmonkey, released in 1994. It was remastered and reissued in 2002 by Trespass Records with a bonus live track.

== Track listing ==
All songs composed by Pushmonkey

No.	Title	Length
1.	"Crush It"	5:38
2.	"Sweet Caribbean Bungalow"	5:10
3.	"Media Shark"	5:14
4.	"Monsters"	4:32
5.	"Tongue"	0:29
6.	"Dribble"	5:59
7.	"Ordinary Cowboy"	0:41
8.	"Mother"	6:06
9.	"Blue"	4:43
10.	"A Little Harder"	4:58
11.	"Leaky Pfaucet"	6:53
12.	"Tag"	3:22
13.	"Crush It (Edit)"	4:59
14.	"Rednose (Live)"	4:46
Total length:		69:30

== Credits ==
=== Pushmonkey ===
- Tony Park – lead vocals, trumpet
- Will Hoffman – guitar, vocals
- Pat Fogarty – bass, vocals
- Howie Behrens – guitar, vocals
- Rico Ybarra – drums on tracks 1 – 12

=== Additional musicians ===
- Willie Nelson – backing vocals on track 7
- Darwin Keys – drums on track 13
