= Lady Bird Johnson =

First Lady of the United States from 1963 to 1969

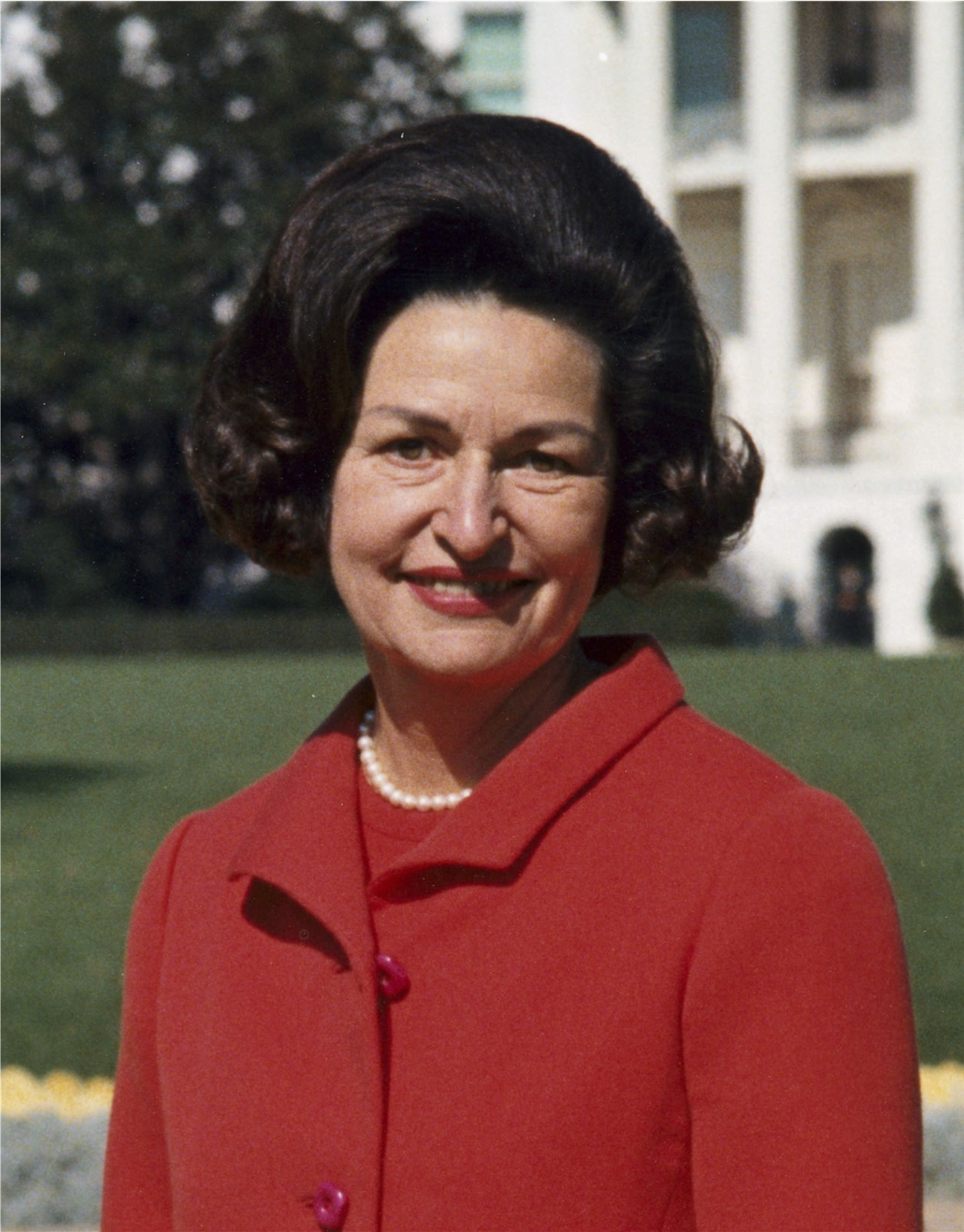
- Official portrait, 1967

First Lady of the United States
- In role November 22, 1963 – January 20, 1969
- President: Lyndon B. Johnson
- Preceded by: Jacqueline Kennedy
- Succeeded by: Pat Nixon

Second Lady of the United States
- In role January 20, 1961 – November 22, 1963
- Vice President: Lyndon B. Johnson
- Preceded by: Pat Nixon
- Succeeded by: Muriel Humphrey

Personal details
- Born: Claudia Alta Taylor; December 22, 1912 Karnack, Texas, U.S.
- Died: July 11, 2007 (aged 94) West Lake Hills, Texas, U.S.
- Resting place: Johnson Family Cemetery
- Party: Democratic
- Spouse: Lyndon B. Johnson (m. 1934; died 1973)
- Children: Lynda; Luci
- Relatives: Johnson family (by marriage)
- Education: St. Mary's Episcopal College for Women; University of Texas, Austin (BA, BJ)

Claudia Alta "Lady Bird" Johnson (née Taylor; December 22, 1912 – July 11, 2007) was the first lady of the United States from 1963 to 1969 as the wife of Lyndon B. Johnson, the 36th president of the United States. She had previously been the second lady of the United States from 1961 to 1963, when her husband was vice president under President John F. Kennedy.

After marrying Lyndon Johnson in 1934 when he was a political hopeful in Austin, Texas, she used a modest inheritance to bankroll his congressional campaign and then ran his office while he served in the Navy.

As first lady, Johnson broke new ground by interacting directly with Congress, employing her own press secretary, and making a solo electioneering tour. She advocated beautifying the nation's cities and highways ("Where flowers bloom, so does hope"). The Highway Beautification Act was informally known as "Lady Bird's Bill". She received the Presidential Medal of Freedom in 1977 and the Congressional Gold Medal in 1984, the highest honors bestowed upon a U.S. civilian. Johnson has been consistently ranked in occasional Siena College Research Institute surveys as one of the most highly regarded American first ladies per historians' assessments.

== Early life ==
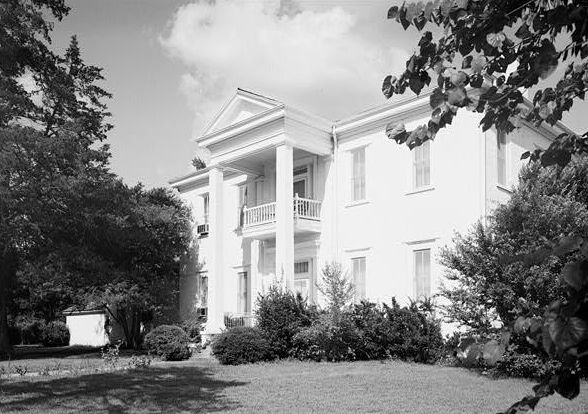
The Brick House, Lady Bird's birthplace and childhood home in Karnack, Texas

Claudia Alta Taylor was born on December 22, 1912, in Karnack, Texas, a town in Harrison County, near the eastern state line with Louisiana. Her birthplace was "The Brick House", an antebellum plantation house on the outskirts of town, which her father had purchased shortly before her birth. She was a descendant of English Protestant martyr Rowland Taylor through his grandson Captain Thomas J. Taylor II.

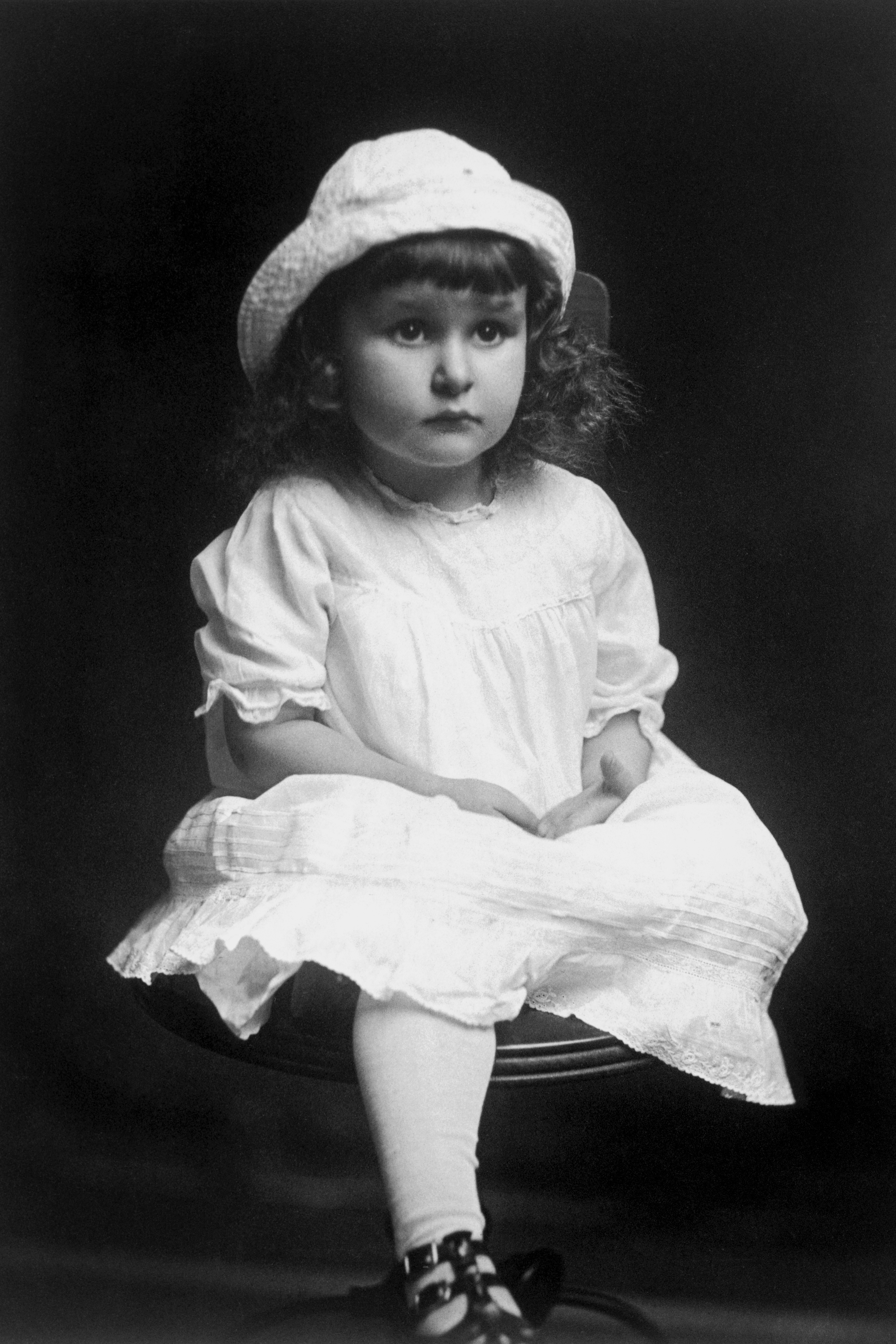
Lady Bird, c. 1915

She was named for her mother's brother Claud. During her infancy, her nursemaid, Alice Tittle, said that she was as "pretty as a ladybird". Opinions differ about whether the name refers to a bird or a ladybird beetle, the latter of which is commonly referred to as a "ladybug" in North America. The nickname virtually replaced her first name for the rest of her life. Her father and siblings called her Lady, and her husband called her Bird—the name she used on her marriage license. During her teenage years, some classmates would call her Bird to provoke her since she reportedly was not fond of the name.

Her father, Thomas Jefferson Jonson Taylor (August 29, 1874 – October 22, 1960), was a sharecropper's son. He became a wealthy businessman and eventually amassed 15,000 acres (6,070 ha) of land where he grew cotton and owned two general stores. His daughter once said: "My father was a very strong character, to put it mildly. He lived by his own rules. It was a whole feudal way of life, really."

Her mother, born Minnie Lee Pattillo (1874–1918), loved opera and felt out of place in Karnack; she was often in "poor emotional and physical health". When Lady Bird was five years old, Minnie fell down a flight of stairs while pregnant. She died of complications of miscarriage in 1918. In a profile of Lady Bird Johnson, Time magazine described Lady Bird's mother as "a tall, eccentric woman from an old and aristocratic Alabama family, [who] liked to wear long white dresses and heavy veils [...] fussed over food fads, played grand opera endlessly on the phonograph, loved to read the classics aloud to tiny Lady Bird [... and who] scandalized people for miles around by entertaining Negroes in her home, and once even started to write a book about Negro religious practices, called Bio Baptism." Her husband, however, tended to see black people as nothing more than "hewers of wood and drawers of water", according to his younger son Anthony.

Lady Bird had two older brothers, Thomas Jefferson Jr. (1901–1959) and Antonio, also known as Tony (1904–1986). Her widowed father married twice more. His second wife was Beulah Taylor, a bookkeeper at a general store. His third wife was Ruth Scroggins, whom he married in 1937.

Lady Bird was largely raised by her maternal aunt Effie Pattillo, who moved to Karnack after her sister's death. She also visited her Pattillo relatives in Autauga County, Alabama, every summer until she was a young woman. As she explained, "Until I was about 20, summertime always meant Alabama to me. With Aunt Effie, we would board the train in Marshall and ride to the part of the world that meant watermelon cuttings, picnics at the creek, and a lot of company every Sunday." According to Lady Bird, her Aunt Effie "opened my spirit to beauty, but she neglected to give me any insight into the practical matters a girl should know about, such as how to dress or choose one's friends or learning to dance."

Lady Bird was a shy and quiet girl who spent much of her youth alone outdoors. "People always look back at it now and assume it was lonely," she once said about her childhood. "To me it definitely was not. ... I spent a lot of time just walking and fishing and swimming." She developed her lifelong love of the outdoors as a child growing up in the tall pines and bayous of East Texas, where she watched the wildflowers bloom each spring.

== Education ==
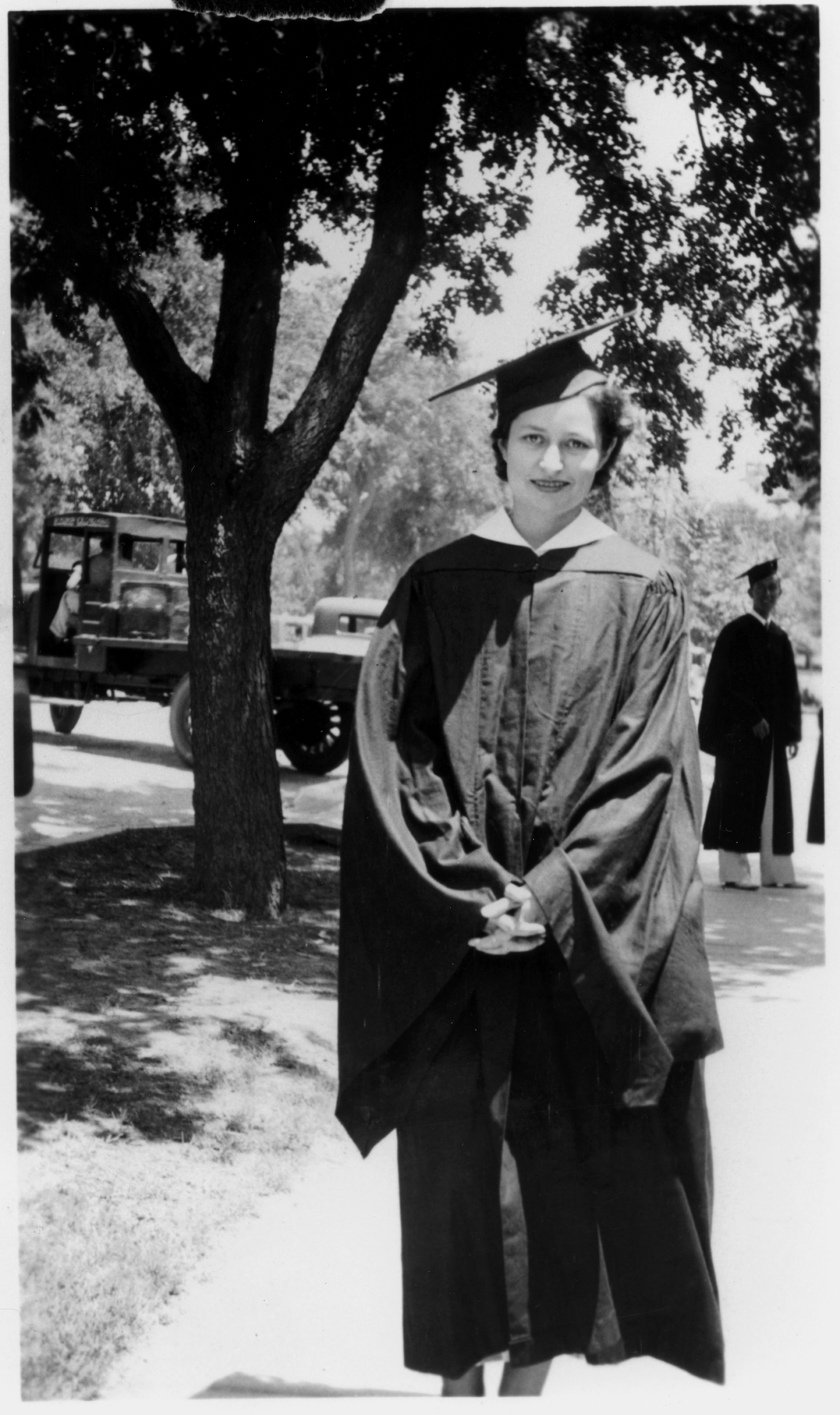
Claudia Taylor's graduation

When it came time to enter high school, Lady Bird had to move away and live with another family during weekdays in the town of Jefferson, Texas, since there was no high school in the Karnack area. (Her brothers were sent to boarding schools in New York.) She graduated third in her class at the age of 15 from Marshall Senior High School in the nearby county seat. Despite her young age, her father gave her a car so that she could drive herself to school, a distance of 15 miles (24 km) each way. She said of that time, "[I]t was an awful chore for my daddy to delegate some person from his business to take me in and out." During her senior year, when she realized that she had the highest grades in her class, she "purposely allowed her grades to slip" so that she would not have to give the valedictorian or salutatorian speech.

After graduating from high school in May 1928, Lady Bird entered the University of Alabama for the summer session, where she took her first journalism course. But, homesick for Texas, she stayed home and did not return for the fall term at Alabama. Instead, she and a high school friend enrolled at St. Mary's Episcopal College for Women, an Episcopal boarding junior college for women in Dallas. It influenced her to "convert to the Episcopal faith", although she waited five years for confirmation.

After graduating from St. Mary's in May 1930, Lady Bird toyed with returning to Alabama. Another friend from Marshall was going to the University of Texas, so she chartered a plane to Austin to join her. As the plane landed, she was awed by the sight of a field covered with bluebonnets and instantly fell in love with the city. Lady Bird received a Bachelor of Arts degree in history with honors in 1933 and a second bachelor's degree in journalism cum laude in 1934. She was active on campus in different organizations, including Texas Orange Jackets, a women's honorary service organization, and believed in student leadership. Her goal was to become a reporter, but she also earned a teaching certificate.

The summer after her second graduation, she and a girlfriend traveled to New York City and Washington, where they peered through the fence at the White House. Dallek described Lady Bird as having undergone a boost in her self-confidence through her years at the college. Her time there marked a departure from her timid behavior in her youth.

== Marriage and family ==
A friend in Austin introduced her to Lyndon B. Johnson, a 26-year-old Congressional aide with political aspirations, working for Congressman Richard Kleberg. Lady Bird recalled having felt "like a moth drawn to a flame". Biographer Randall B. Woods attributed Johnson's "neglect of his legal studies" to his courting of Lady Bird.

On their first date, at the Driskill Hotel, Lyndon proposed. Lady Bird did not want to rush into marriage, but he was persistent and did not want to wait. Ten weeks later, she accepted his proposal. They got married on November 17, 1934, at St. Mark's Episcopal Church in San Antonio, Texas.

After suffering three miscarriages, the couple had two daughters together: Lynda Bird (born 1944) and Luci Baines (born 1947). The couple and their two daughters all shared the initials LBJ. Their daughters lived in the White House during their teenage years, under media scrutiny.

Lynda Bird married Charles S. Robb in a White House ceremony. He was later elected governor of Virginia and U.S. Senator. Luci Baines married Pat Nugent in the Basilica of the National Shrine of the Immaculate Conception and, later, Ian Turpin. Lady Bird had seven grandchildren and ten great-grandchildren at the time of her death.

However, their marriage suffered due to Lyndon's numerous affairs—in particular, the relationship between Lyndon and socialite Alice Marsh. This relationship was on and off between 1939 and the early years of his presidency and was eventually ended due to Marsh's opposition to the Vietnam War. Lady Bird Johnson's awareness of these infidelities was included in her 2007 obituary, noting that Lady Bird "was openly humiliated". Her husband would even brag that he had slept with more women than his predecessor, John F. Kennedy.

== Early politics ==
When Lyndon decided to run for Congress from Austin's 10th district, Lady Bird provided the money to launch his campaign. She took $10,000 of her inheritance from her mother's estate to help start his political career (equivalent to about $220,000 in 2025). The couple settled in Washington, D.C., after Lyndon was elected to Congress. After he enlisted in the Navy at the outset of the Second World War, Lady Bird ran his congressional office.

Lady Bird sometimes served as a mediating force between her wilful husband and those he encountered. On one occasion after Lyndon had clashed with Dan Rather, then a young Houston reporter, Lady Bird followed Rather in her car. Stopping him, she invited him to return and have some punch, explaining, "That's just the way Lyndon sometimes is."

During the years of the Johnson presidency, Lyndon, in one incident, yelled at the White House photographer who failed to show up for a photo shoot with the First Lady. She consoled the photographer afterward, who said that, despite his feelings against President Johnson, he "would walk over hot coals for Lady Bird."

== Business career ==
In January–February 1943, during World War II, Lady Bird Johnson spent $17,500 (equivalent to about $330,000 in 2025) of her inheritance to purchase KTBC, an Austin radio station. She bought the radio station from a three-man partnership that included Robert B. Anderson, a future U.S. secretary of the navy and U.S. secretary of the treasury, and Texas oilman and rancher Wesley West.

She served as president of the LBJ Holding Co., and her husband negotiated an agreement with the CBS radio network. Despite Lyndon's objections, Lady Bird expanded by buying a television station in 1952. She reminded him that she could do as she wished with her inheritance. The station, KTBC-TV/7 (then affiliated with CBS as well), was Austin's monopoly VHF franchise and generated revenues that made the Johnsons millionaires. Over the years, journalists have revealed that Lyndon used his influence in the Senate to influence the Federal Communications Commission into granting the monopoly license, which was in Lady Bird's name.

LBJ Holding also had two small banks; they failed and were closed in 1991 by the FDIC. But the core Johnson radio properties survived and prospered. They would later make an agreement with Sinclair Telecable in 1997 to form LBJS Broadcasting Company, L.P. Emmis Communications bought KLBJ, KLBJ-FM, KGSR, and three other stations from LBJ Holding in 2003 for $105 million.

Eventually, Lady Bird's initial $41,000 investment turned into more than $150 million for the LBJ Holding Company. She was the first president's wife to have become a millionaire in her own right before her husband was elected to office. She remained involved with the company until she was in her eighties.

== Second Lady of the United States ==
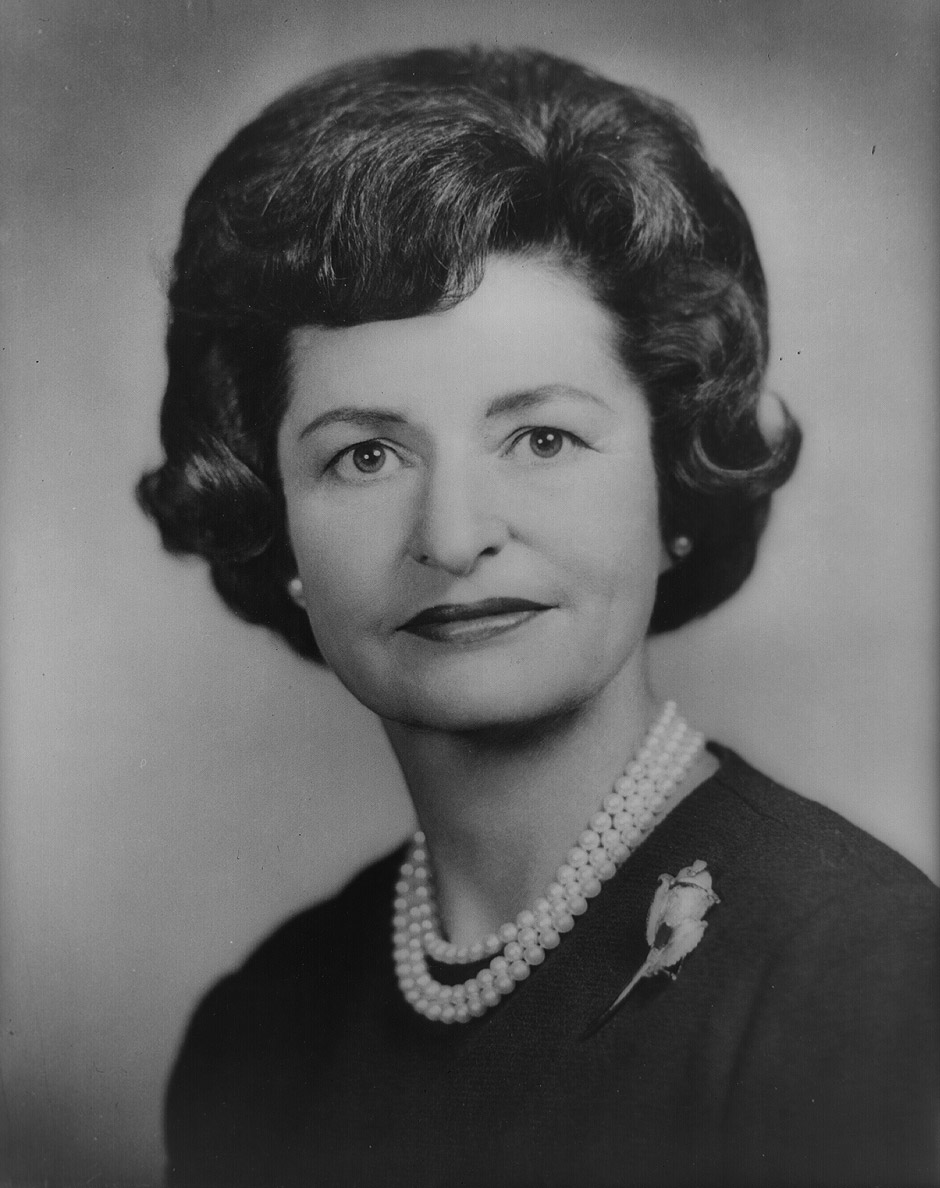
Johnson, c. 1962

John F. Kennedy chose Lyndon Johnson as his running mate for the 1960 election. At Kennedy's request, Lady Bird took an expanded role during the campaign, as his wife Jacqueline was pregnant with their second child. Over 71 days, Lady Bird traveled 35,000 miles (56,000 km) through 11 states and appeared at 150 events. Kennedy and Johnson won the election that November, with Lady Bird helping the Democratic ticket carry seven Southern states.

Reflecting later, Lady Bird said that the years her husband served as vice president and she as Second Lady were "a very different period of our lives." Nationally, the two had a kind of celebrity, but they both found the office of vice president to lack power.

As the vice president's wife, Lady Bird often served as a substitute for Jacqueline Kennedy at official events and functions. Within her first year as Second Lady, she had substituted for Mrs. Kennedy at more than 50 events, roughly one per week. This experience prepared Lady Bird for the following challenges of her unexpected years as First Lady.

On November 22, 1963, the Johnsons were accompanying the Kennedys in Dallas when President Kennedy was assassinated; they were two cars behind the president in his motorcade. Lyndon was sworn in as president on Air Force One two hours after Kennedy died, with Lady Bird and Jacqueline Kennedy by his side. Afterward, Lady Bird created a tape on which she recorded her memories of the assassination, saying it was "primarily as a form of therapy to help me over the shock and horror of the experience." She submitted a transcript of the tape to the Warren Commission as testimony. LBJ advisor Abe Fortas had made notations on her document to add detail. In their plans for their trip to Texas, the Johnsons had intended to entertain the Kennedys that night at their ranch.

In the days following the assassination, Lady Bird worked with Jacqueline Kennedy on the transition of her husband to the White House. While having great respect for Jacqueline and finding her strong in the aftermath of the murder, Lady Bird believed from the start of her tenure as first lady that she would be unfavorably compared to her immediate predecessor. On her last day in the White House, Jacqueline Kennedy left Lady Bird a note in which she promised she would "be happy" there.

== First Lady of the United States ==
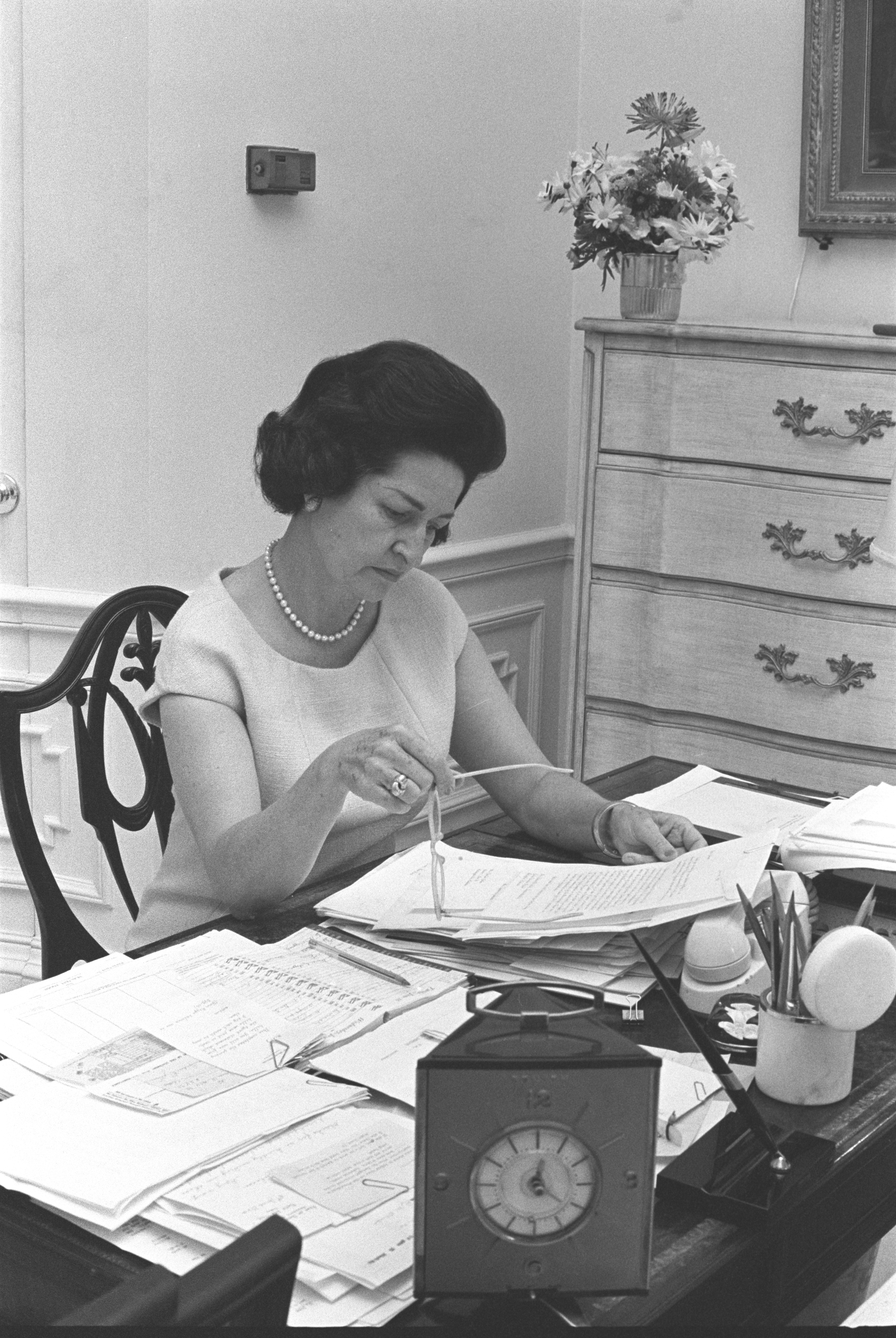
Johnson working in her office

As first lady and trusted presidential confidant, Lady Bird Johnson helped establish the public environmental movement in the 1960s. She worked to beautify Washington, D.C., by planting thousands of flowers, set up the White House Natural Beauty Conference, and lobbied Congress for the president's full range of environmental initiatives. In 1965, she took the lead in calling for passage of the Highway Beautification Act. The act called for control of outdoor advertising, including removal of certain types of signs, along the nation's growing Interstate Highway System and the existing federal-aid primary highway system. It also required certain junkyards along Interstate or primary highways to be removed or screened and encouraged scenic enhancement and roadside development. According to Secretary of Interior Stewart Udall, she single-handedly, "influenced the president to demand-and support-more far-sighted conservation legislation."

Her capital beautification project turned the national capital into a showcase for the nation. It was intended to improve physical conditions in Washington, D.C., for residents and tourists by planting millions of flowers, many of them on National Park Service land along roadways around the capital. She said, "Where flowers bloom, so does hope."

She worked extensively with the American Association of Nurserymen (AAN) executive Vice President Robert F. Lederer to protect wildflowers and promoted planting them along highways. Her efforts inspired similar programs throughout the country. She became the first president's wife to advocate actively for legislation when she was instrumental in promoting the Highway Beautification Act, which was nicknamed "Lady Bird's Bill". It was developed to beautify the nation's highway system by limiting billboards and by planting roadside areas. The HBA had its critics as it negatively impacted many highway adjacent businesses due to restrictions on signage. She was also an advocate of the Head Start program to give children from lower-income families a step up in school readiness.

Lady Bird created the modern structure of the First Lady's office: she was the first in this role to have a press secretary and chief of staff of her own, and an outside liaison with Congress. Her press secretary from 1963 to 1969 was Liz Carpenter, a fellow alumna of the University of Texas. As a mark of changing times, Carpenter was the first professional newswoman to become press secretary to a First Lady; she also served as Lady Bird's staff director. Lady Bird's tenure as First Lady marked the beginning of hiring employees in the East Wing to work specifically on the First Lady's projects.

President Johnson had initially said he would turn down the Democratic Party nomination for president in 1964, having been unhappy during his service in President Kennedy's administration and believing the party did not want him. Although aides could not sway him, the First Lady convinced him otherwise, reassuring him of his worthiness and saying that if he dropped out, the Republicans would likely take the White House.

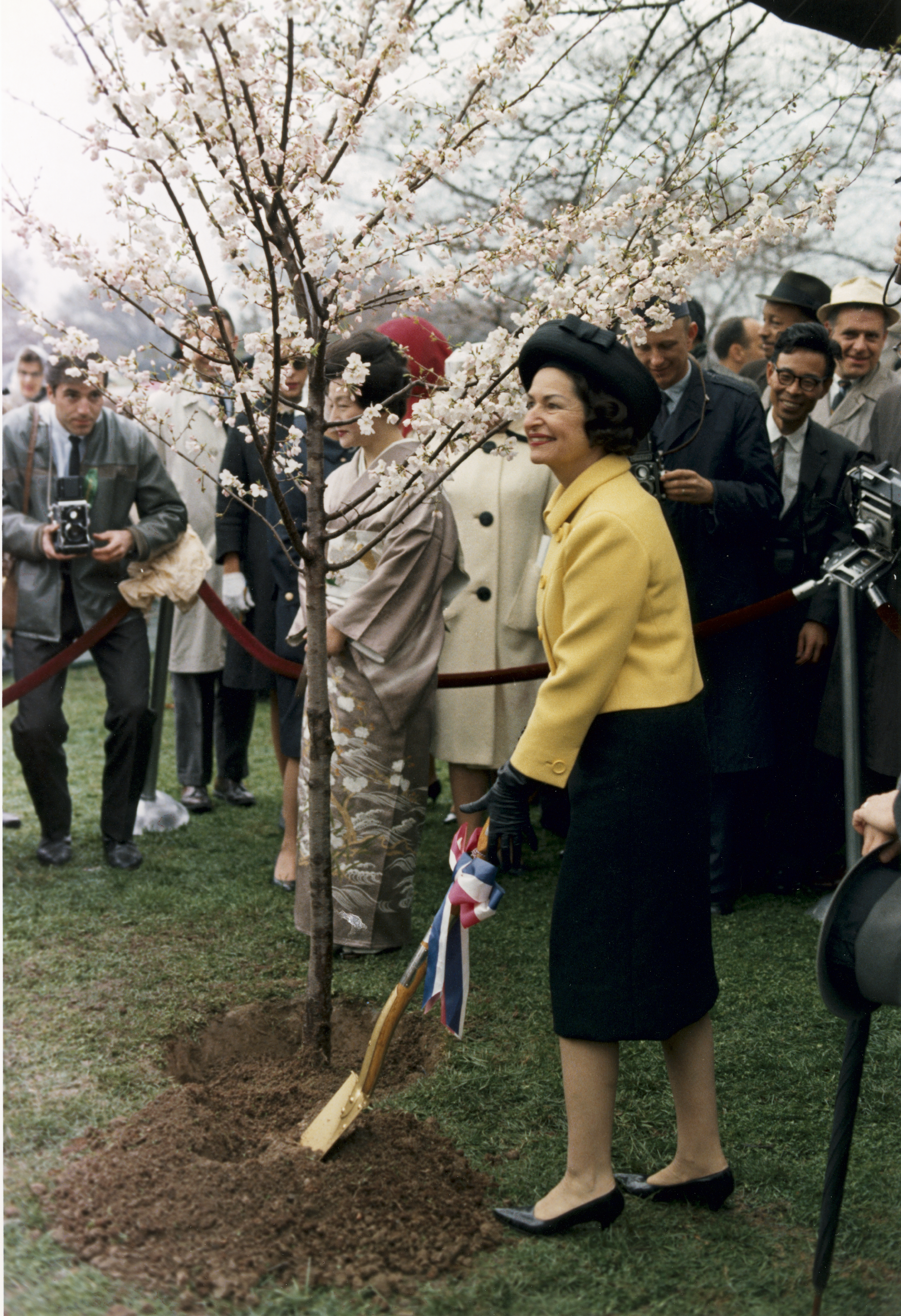
Johnson plants a cherry tree.

During the 1964 campaign, Lady Bird traveled through eight Southern states from October 6 to 9 in a chartered train, the Lady Bird Special, at one point giving 45 speeches over four days. It was the first solo whistle-stop tour by a First Lady. In the same month, Lady Bird continued her campaign tour by airplane, with stops in Texas, Oklahoma, Arkansas, Indiana, and Kentucky.

In the November 1964 presidential election, Johnson won a landslide victory over his Republican opponent, Barry Goldwater. At the ceremony to swear in the new president, Lady Bird held the Bible as her husband took the oath of office on January 20, 1965, starting a tradition which continues.

On September 22, 1965, Lady Bird dedicated a Peoria, Illinois, landscape plaza, with the president of the Peoria City Beautification Association, Leslie Kenyon, saying during the ceremony that Lady Bird was the first presidential spouse "who has visited our city as an official guest in our 140 years of existence."

On September 22, 1966, Lady Bird dedicated the Glen Canyon Dam in northern Arizona, fulfilling a goal that both presidents Kennedy and Johnson had sought to accomplish. She said the dam belonged to all Americans amid an increasing concern for water that affected every American "no matter whether he lives in New York or Page, Arizona."

In late-August 1967, Lady Bird traveled to Montreal, Quebec, Canada, to attend the Expo 67, a White House aide saying she had been urged by the President to travel there since his own trip three months prior.

In mid-September 1967, Lady Bird began touring the Midwestern United States as part of a trip that one White House described as "mostly agriculture during the day and culture at night." President Johnson was then declining in support by farmers, months before a planned re-election bid. Speaking to a crowd in Minneapolis, Minnesota, on September 20, Lady Bird said problems within American cities were creating crime.

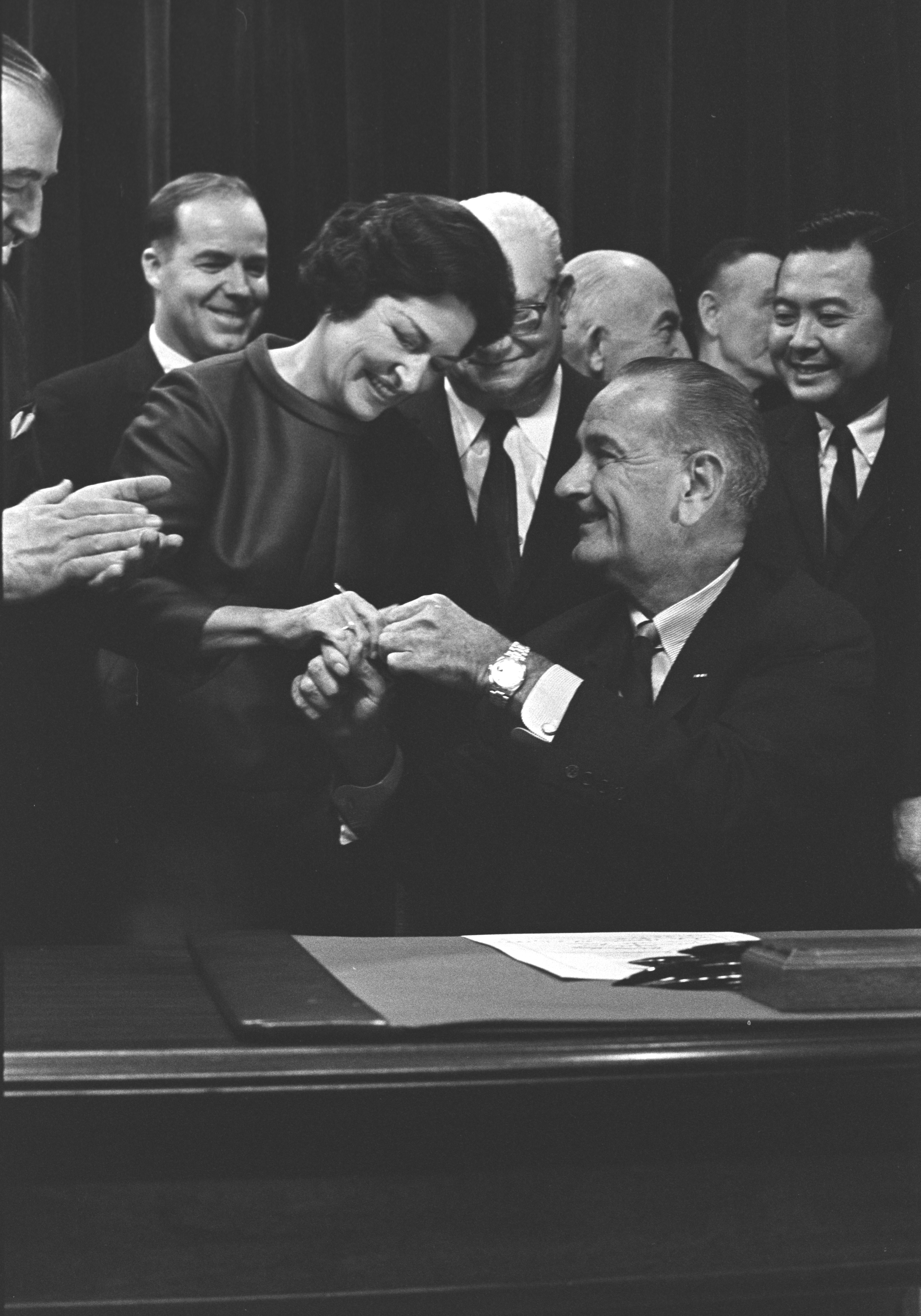
Lady Bird Johnson at the signing of the Highway Beautification Act, also referred to as "Lady Bird's Bill"

In January 1968 at a White House luncheon, Eartha Kitt, when asked by the first lady what her views were on the Vietnam War, replied: "You send the best of this country off to be shot and maimed. No wonder the kids rebel and take pot." Kitt's anti-war remarks reportedly angered Lyndon and Mrs. Johnson, and this resulted in the derailment of Kitt's professional career.

Toward the end of Johnson's first term, Lady Bird was anxious for her husband to leave office. In September 1967, Lady Bird voiced her concerns that a second term would be detrimental to his health. Health concerns may have been one of the reasons why President Johnson decided not to seek re-election.

In 1970, Lady Bird published A White House Diary, her intimate, behind-the-scenes account of her husband's presidency spanning November 22, 1963, to January 20, 1969. Beginning with President Kennedy's assassination, she recorded the momentous events of her times, including the Great Society's War on Poverty; the national civil rights and social protest movements; her activism on behalf of the environment; and the Vietnam War.

Johnson was acquainted with a long span of fellow first ladies, from Eleanor Roosevelt to Laura Bush. She was protected by the United States Secret Service for 44 years.

=== Historical assessments ===
Since 1982 Siena College Research Institute has periodically conducted surveys asking historians to assess American first ladies according to a cumulative score on the independent criteria of their background, value to the country, intelligence, courage, accomplishments, integrity, leadership, being their own women, public image, and value to the president. Consistently, Johnson has ranked among the seven-most highly regarded first ladies in these surveys. In terms of cumulative assessment, Johnson has been ranked:

- 3rd-best of 42 in 1982
- 6th-best of 37 in 1993
- 7th-best of 38 in 2003
- 5th-best of 38 in 2008
- 7th-best of 39 in 2014
- 7th-best of 40 in 2020

In the 2008 Siena Research Institute survey, Johnson was ranked in the top five for six out of the ten criteria, ranking the 5th highest in background, 5th highest in intelligence, 5th highest in value to the country, 5th highest in integrity, 4th highest in her accomplishments, and 5th highest in leadership. In additional questions asked in the 2014 survey, among 20th- and 21st-century American first ladies, historians assessed Johnson as the 5th easiest to imagine serving as president herself, having had the 5th-greatest public service after leaving the White House, and having been the 5th best in creating a lasting legacy. In the 2014 survey, Johnson and her husband were also ranked the 10th highest out of 39 first couples in terms of being a "power couple". A supplementary question to respondents of the 2020 survey assessing the effectiveness of the signature initiatives of Johnson and all of the ten subsequent first ladies ranked Johnson's efforts promoting environmental protection and beautification as the most-effective initiative.

Biographer Betty Boyd Caroli said in 2015 of Johnson that,

She really invented the job of the modern first lady. She was the first one to have a big staff, the first one to have a comprehensive program in her own name, the first one to write a book about the White House years, when she leaves. She had an important role in setting up an enduring role for her husband with the LBJ Library. She's the first one to campaign extensively on her own for her husband.

Writing in 1986, William H. Inman observed that Johnson was considered by some "the most effective First Lady since Eleanor Roosevelt", citing her battles against highway billboard forests, auto heaps, and junk piles as well as her support for American public landscapes maintaining beauty and sanity.

== Later life ==
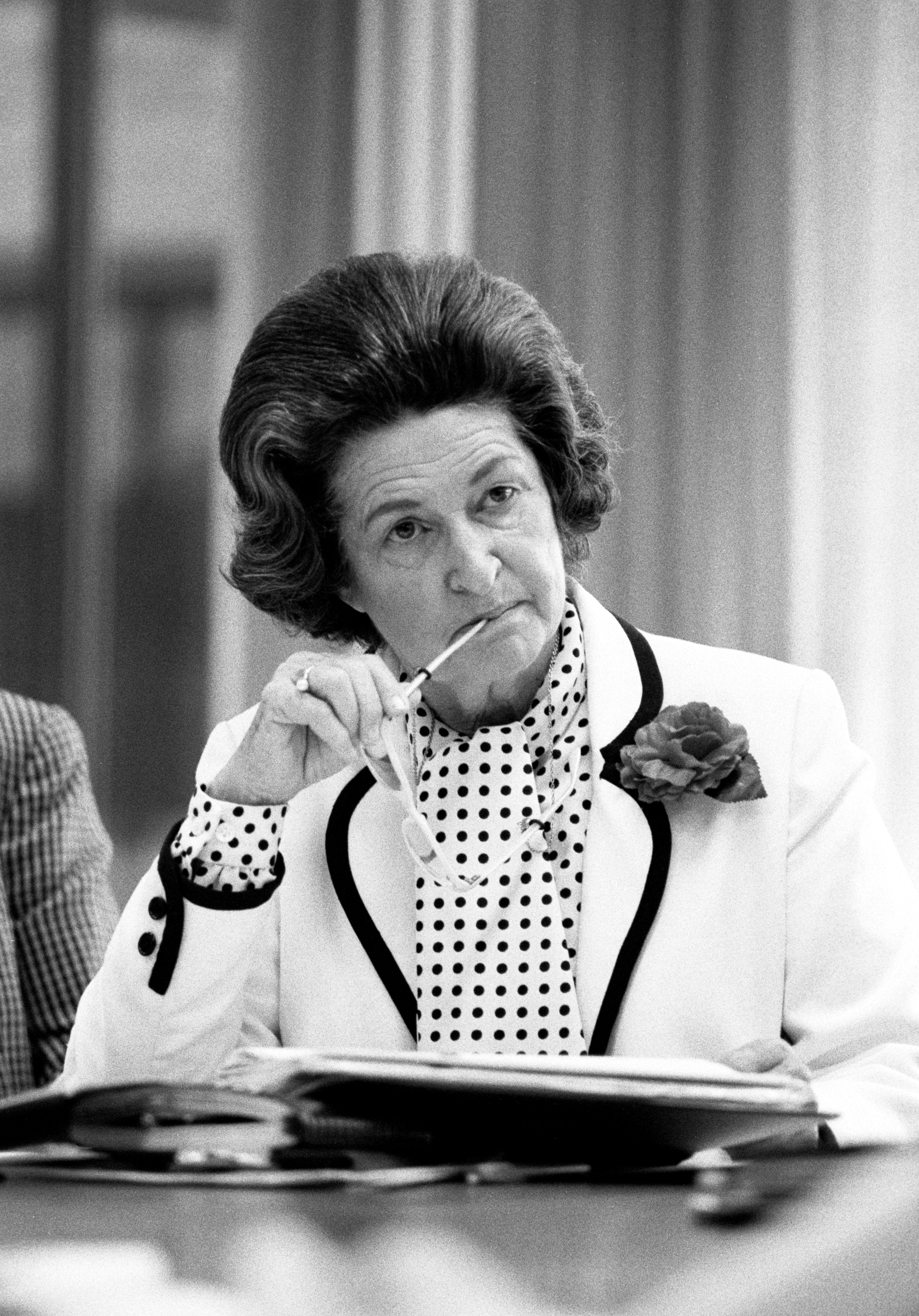
Johnson at a Lyndon B. Johnson Foundation Board Meeting

The Johnsons retired to their ranch in Stonewall, Texas after Nixon's inauguration, being flown on the same plane the former president had been sworn-in aboard after the Kennedy assassination. The Lyndon B. Johnson Presidential Library and Museum opened on the grounds of the University of Texas in Austin in May 1971. The ceremony was attended by the former president and First Lady and former cabinet members with President Nixon also in attendance. After Senator George McGovern became the Democratic nominee in the 1972 presidential election, he traveled to the LBJ Ranch to meet with the former president and first lady for three hours in a session that he called "friendly and helpful." The Johnsons traveled to the Truman Library in Independence to pay respects to the former president while his body laid in the library's lobby in December 1972.

Former President Johnson died of a heart attack in 1973, four years after leaving office. When he suffered the heart attack, Lady Bird was in a meeting, and the former president had died when she reached him. She arranged for the body to lie in state at the Johnson Presidential Library the following day, and the body was laid to rest two days later. The couple's elder daughter, Lynda, said that God "knew what he was doing" when her father died ahead of her mother; she thought her father would not have been able to live without Lady Bird. After his death, Lady Bird took time to travel and spent more time with her daughters. She remained in the public eye, honoring her husband and other presidents. She entertained the wives of governors at the LBJ Presidential Library.

In the 1970s, Johnson focused her attention on the Austin riverfront area through her involvement in the Town Lake Beautification Project. From 1971 to 1978, she served on the board of regents for the University of Texas System. She also served on the National Park Service Advisory Board, and was the first woman to serve on National Geographic Society's Board of Trustees. President Nixon mentioned her as a possible ambassador in a circulated memo, but never nominated her for office.

In December 1973, after President Nixon established the Lyndon Baines Johnson Memorial Grove on the Potomac, he notified Johnson via a telephone call. Johnson had approved the project earlier in the year.

In August 1974, Johnson and Representative J. J. Pickle unveiled the statue of her late husband at the Lyndon B. Johnson State Park and Historic Site. Johnson was by President Ford's side when he dedicated the LBJ Memorial Grove in September 1974. Ford and the former First Lady were joined by the latter's daughters and granddaughters in wielding gold shovels at the first tree site. To celebrate her birthday in December, Johnson's friends held a party at the Menger Hotel bar and walked to Bonham and Crockett Streets for the dedication of the Lady Bird Johnson Fountain. Marshall T. Steves and other friends of Johnson had raised the $75,000 to build the fountain after she had suggested San Antonio could use a new one. The fountain was demolished in 2020 to accommodate the construction of the Fiesta Parade route.

In August 1975, after First Lady Betty Ford made comments on sex, Johnson expressed sympathy: "I know the pressures of being a First Lady, and I think maybe she got asked one question too quick."

During the 1976 United States presidential election, Democratic nominee Jimmy Carter apologized to Johnson over comments he made about her husband during an interview in which he stated he would not follow trends of "lying, cheating, and distorting the truth" set forth by former Presidents Nixon and Johnson. Carter won the election, and appointed her to the President's Commission on White House Fellowships.

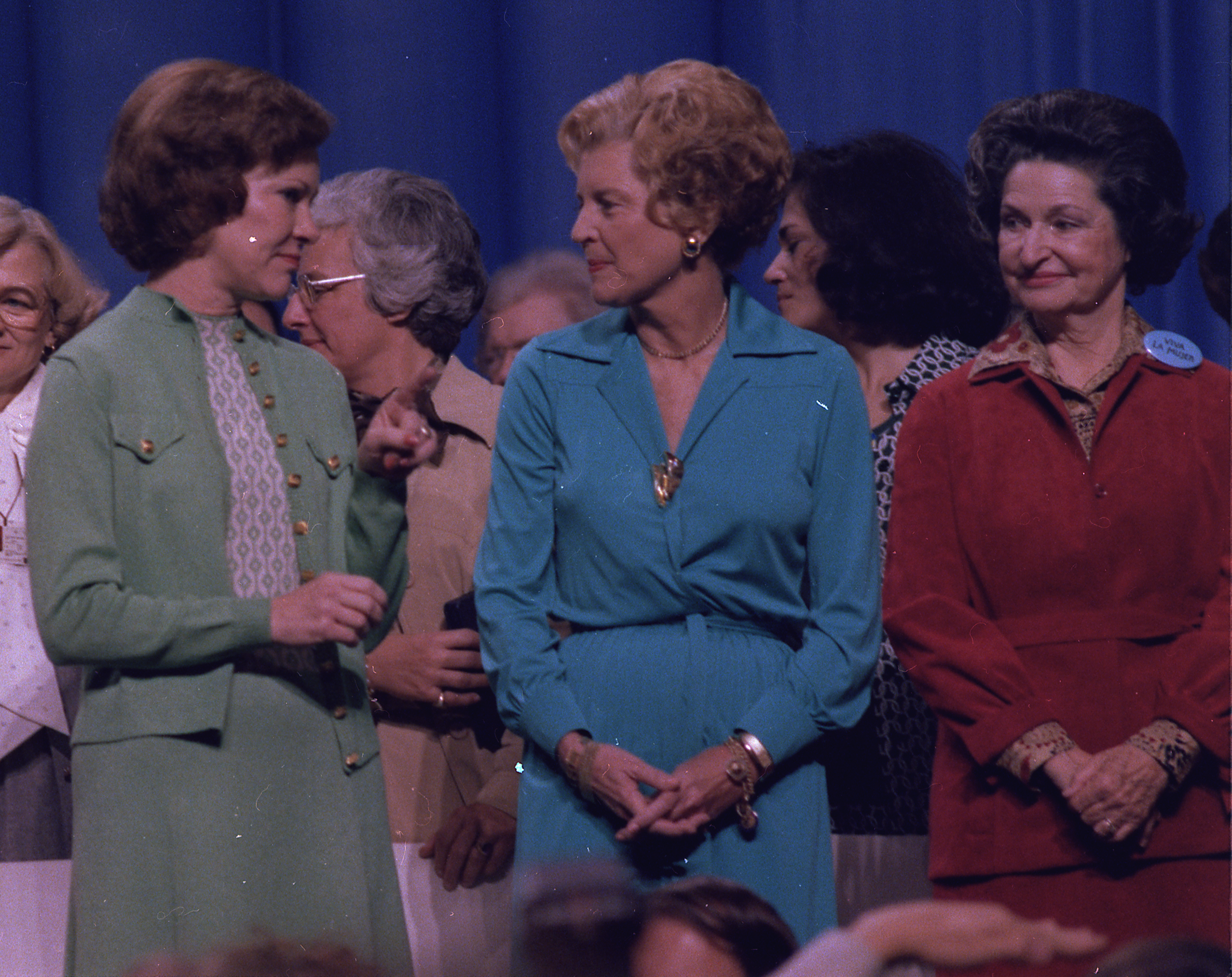
Johnson (right) together at the 1977 National Women's Conference with First Lady Rosalynn Carter (left) and fellow former first lady Betty Ford (center)

In November 1977, Johnson spoke at the 1977 National Women's Conference among other speakers including Rosalynn Carter, Betty Ford, Bella Abzug, Barbara Jordan, Cecilia Burciaga, Gloria Steinem, Lenore Hershey and Jean O'Leary.

In January 1978, Johnson attended the funeral services of Hubert Humphrey at the US Capitol.

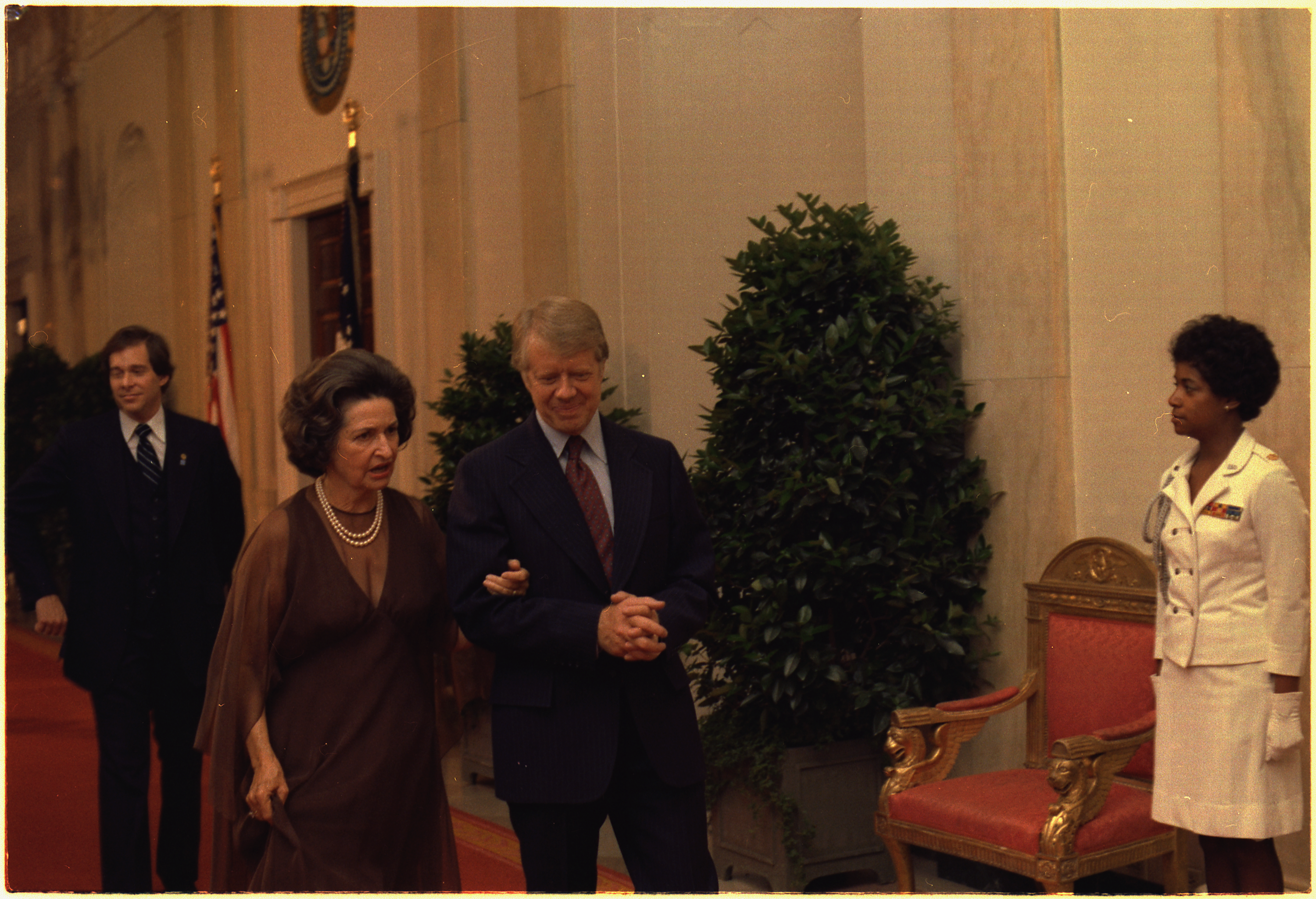
Johnson alongside president Jimmy Carter in September, 1977

On March 12, 1980, Johnson returned to the White House and attended a reception commemorating the fifteenth anniversary of the Head Start program. In his remarks, President Carter expressed gratitude for her attending as he stated "she personifies too, as you know, the essence of what this great man did with those who worked around him", referring to her late husband.

In June 1981, officials of Dartmouth College stated that Johnson and former President Gerald Ford would serve as co-chairs of the fundraising committee for the Rockefeller Center for the Social Sciences. Johnson later attended the dedication of the center in September 1983.

In 1982, Johnson and actress Helen Hayes founded the National Wildflower Research Center west of Austin, Texas, as a nonprofit organization devoted to preserving and reintroducing native plants in planned landscapes. In 1994, the center opened a new facility southwest of Austin; they officially renamed it the Lady Bird Johnson Wildflower Center in 1995 in acknowledgment of her having raised $10 million for the facility. In 2006, the center was incorporated into the University of Texas at Austin.

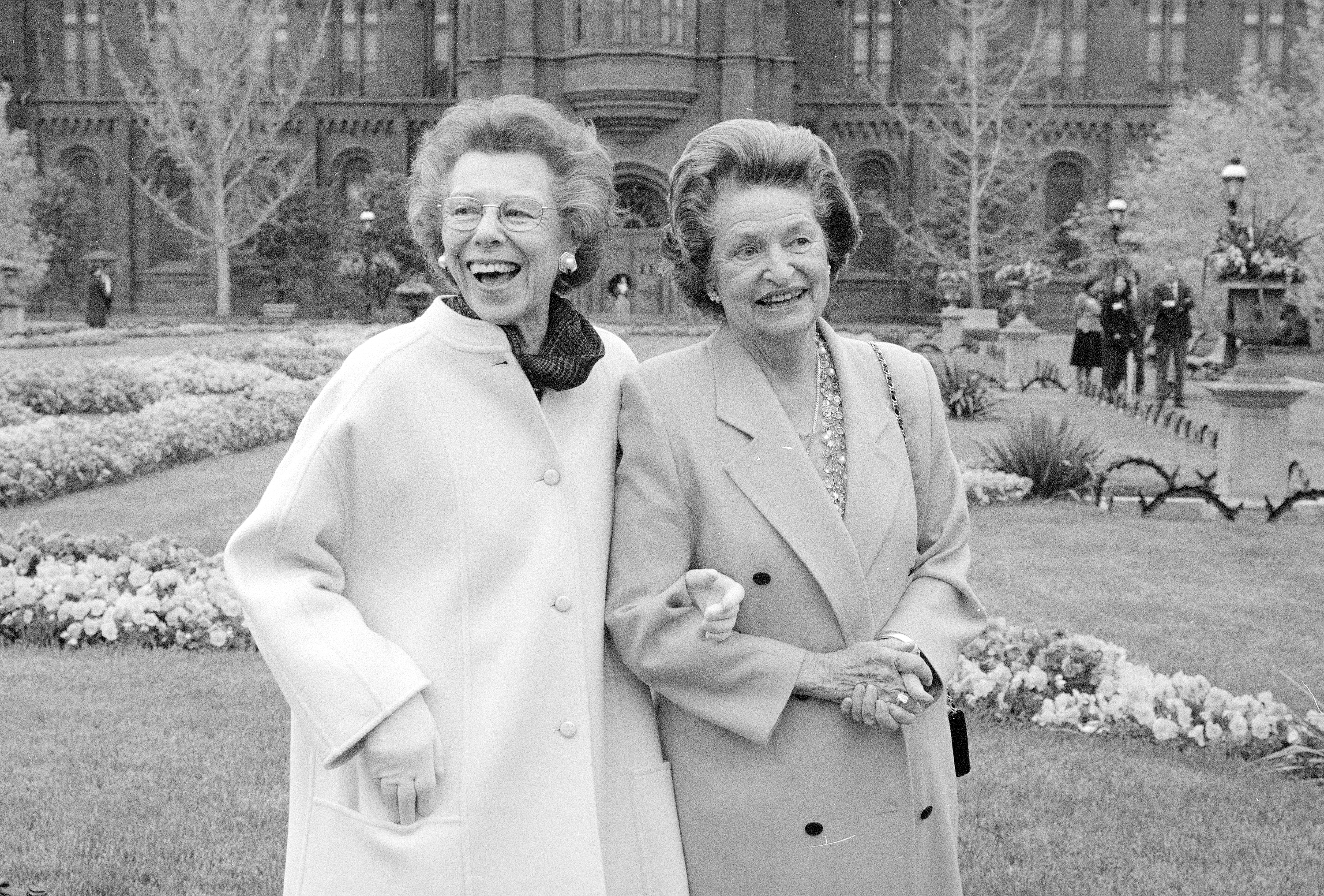
Johnson with philanthropist Enid A. Haupt in 1988

In 1988, Johnson convened with three other former first ladies—Betty Ford, Rosalynn Carter, and Pat Nixon—at the "Women and the Constitution" conference at The Carter Center to assess that document's impact on women. The conference featured over 150 speakers and 1,500 attendees from all 50 states and 10 foreign countries. The conference was meant to promote awareness on sexual inequality in other countries, and fight against it in America.

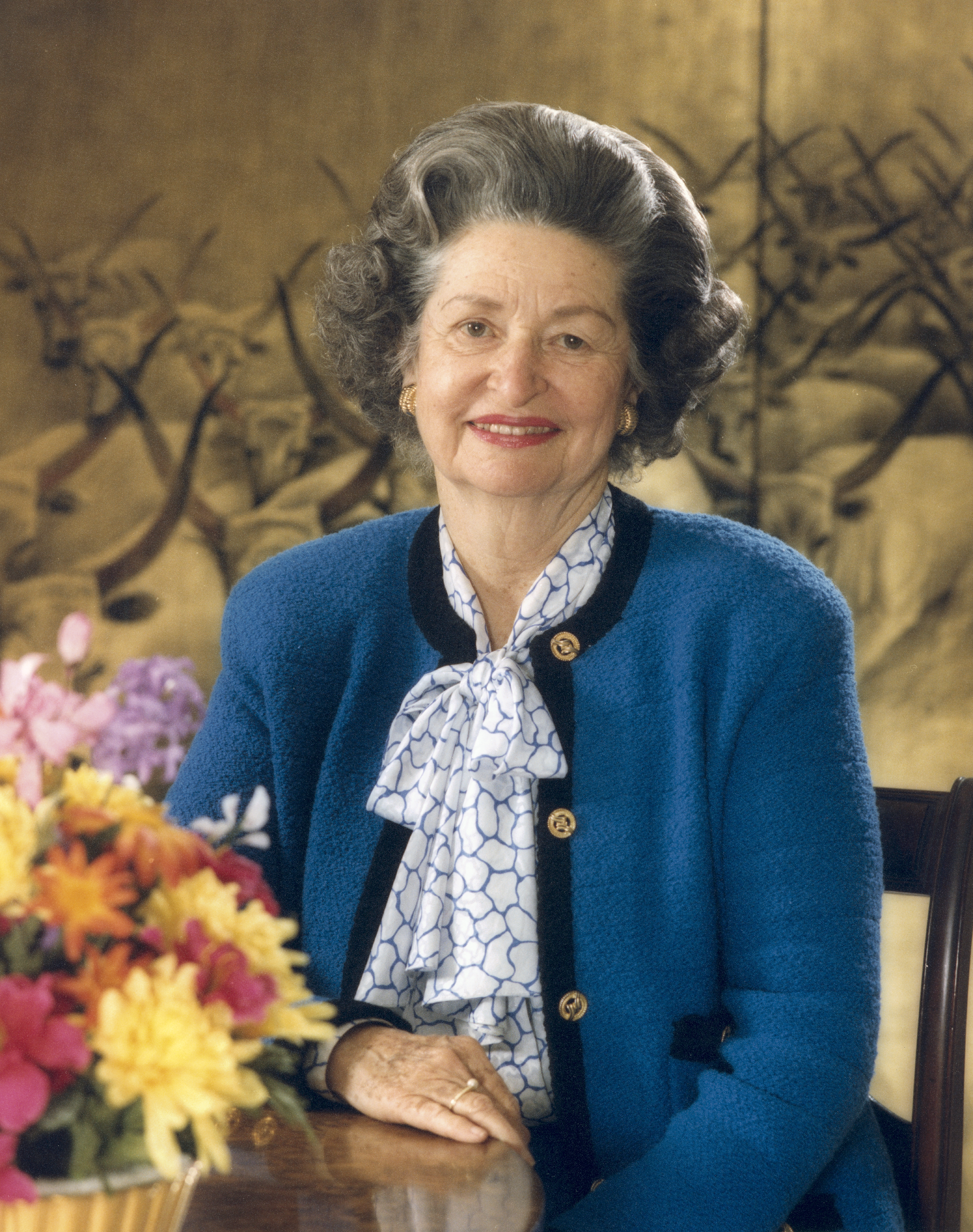
Johnson c. 1989

For 20 years, Johnson spent her summers on the Massachusetts island of Martha's Vineyard, renting the home of Charles Guggenheim for many of those years. She said she had greatly appreciated the island's natural beauty and flowers.

In August 1984, Johnson publicly stated her support for the vice-presidential nomination of Geraldine Ferraro in that year's presidential election while admitting the difficulty the Mondale-Ferraro ticket faced in winning Texas.

Johnson returned to the White House for the twenty-fifth-anniversary celebration of her husband's inauguration on April 6, 1990. Incumbent President George H. W. Bush praised her for her support of her husband and work toward beautifying landscapes.

In September 1991, Johnson unveiled a new line of English porcelain flower sculpture that drew influence from American wildflowers in the Corrigan's Jewelry at NorthPark Center in Dallas. In November, Johnson took a private tour of the Richard Nixon Presidential Library and Museum, where she planted three Lady Bird Johnson rose bushes in the First Lady's Garden at the facility. She joined five presidents and five First Ladies at the dedication of the Ronald Reagan Presidential Library and Museum in Simi Valley days later.

To celebrate Johnson's eightieth birthday in December 1992, the LBJ Library invited over a 1,000 people for a two-day celebration that featured family members, political figures, and celebrities participating in reminisces and seminars. The celebration also saw the debut of a film by Charles Guggenheim capturing significant moments from her life.

In May 1994, Johnson joined four other former First Ladies and Hillary Clinton at a gala benefit in Washington aimed at raising more than $1 million toward a new National Garden.

In November 1997, Johnson attended the dedication ceremony for the George H. W. Bush Presidential Library and Museum at Texas A&M University.

In October 1999, Johnson, Betty Ford, Rosalynn Carter, and Barbara Bush made a joint appearance at an event hosted by the Charles A. Dana Foundation to mark the foundation's fiftieth anniversary. The four each received the Distinguished Achievement Award, and were asked to choose a recipient for a $100,000 foundation grant. Johnson chose the Lady Bird Johnson Wildflower Center.

To celebrate the 200th anniversary of the White House, President Clinton invited Johnson, the Fords, the Carters, and the Bushes to dine at the White House in November 2000.

On October 13, 2006, Johnson made a rare public appearance at the renovation announcement of the LBJ Library and Museum.

=== Health problems and death ===
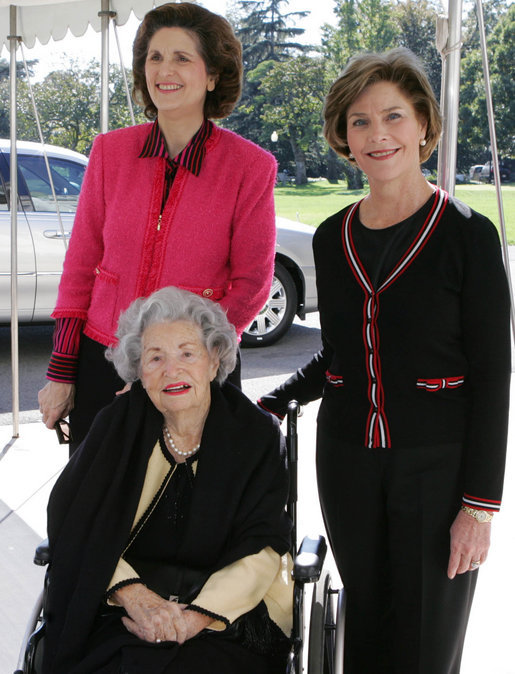
Johnson with her daughter Lynda Johnson Robb and First Lady Laura Bush on October 19, 2005

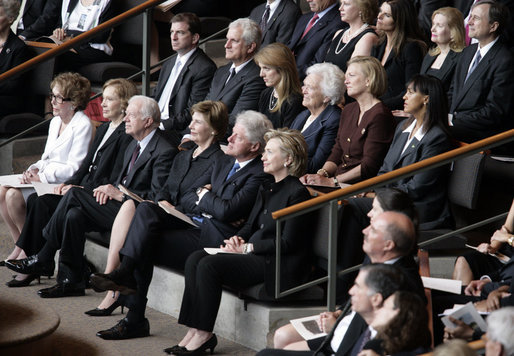
Funeral service for Lady Bird Johnson; Nancy Reagan, Rosalynn Carter, Jimmy Carter, Laura Bush, Bill Clinton, Hillary Clinton, (second row) Caroline Kennedy, Barbara Bush, Susan Ford Bales, (third row) Maria Shriver, and Patricia "Tricia" Nixon Cox attended, representing eight other presidents.

In 1986, 13 years after her husband's death, Johnson's health began to fail. She suffered her first fainting spell that year while attending a funeral, and entered St. David's Community Hospital for observation. She also injured her left knee in a fall the day before her hospitalization. In August 1993, she suffered a stroke and became legally blind due to macular degeneration. In 1999, she was hospitalized for a second fainting spell. In 2002, she suffered a second, more severe, stroke, which left her unable to speak normally or walk without assistance. In 2005, she spent a few days in an Austin hospital for treatment of bronchitis. In February 2006, Lynda Johnson Robb told a gathering at the Truman Library in Independence, Missouri, that her mother was totally blind and was "not in very good health". In June 2007, she spent six days in Seton Hospital in Austin after suffering from a low-grade fever.

Lady Bird Johnson died at home on July 11, 2007, at 4:18 p.m. (CDT) from natural causes at the age of 94, attended by family members and Catholic priest Father Robert Scott.

At the funeral service, her daughter, Luci Baines Johnson gave a eulogy, saying, "A few weeks before Mother died, I was taking visiting relatives to the extraordinary Blanton Art Museum ... Mother was on IV antibiotics, a feeding tube, and oxygen, but she wasn't gonna let little things like that deter her from discovering another great art museum. What a picture we were—literally rolling through the museum like a mobile hospital."

Three weeks before Johnson's death, the rector of St. Barnabas Episcopal Church in Fredericksburg, which had been her second home for more than 50 years, had announced to his parishioners that she had given $300,000 to pay off the church's mortgage.

Johnson's funeral was a public event. On July 15, 2007, a ceremonial cortège left the Texas State Capitol. The public was invited to line the route through downtown Austin on Congress Avenue and along the shores of Lady Bird Lake to pay their respects. The public part of the funeral procession ended in Johnson City. The family had a private burial at the Johnson family cemetery in Stonewall, where she was buried next to her husband, who had died 34 years earlier. Unlike previous funerals for first ladies, the pallbearers came from members of the armed forces.

== Honors ==
On August 27, 1969, President Richard Nixon dedicated a 300-acre (120 ha) grove of redwood trees as the "Lady Bird Johnson Grove" due to her efforts as First Lady toward preserving national resources for Americans. The grove is located just north of Orick, California, and is part of Redwood National Park. Lady Bird attended the dedication with former President Johnson.

Lady Bird Johnson was awarded the Presidential Medal of Freedom by President Gerald Ford on January 10, 1977. The citation for her medal read:

One of America's great First Ladies, she claimed her own place in the hearts and history of the American people. In councils of power or in homes of the poor, she made government human with her unique compassion and her grace, warmth and wisdom. Her leadership transformed the American landscape and preserved its natural beauty as a national treasure.

She received the Congressional Gold Medal in 1988, becoming the first wife of a president to receive the honor. In a 1982 poll taken of historians ranking the most influential and important First Ladies, Lady Bird was ranked third—behind Abigail Adams and Eleanor Roosevelt—primarily for her work as a conservation activist.

In 1995, the National Wildflower Research Center, near Austin, Texas, was renamed the Lady Bird Johnson Wildflower Center. She and actress Helen Hayes founded the center in 1982.

In 1966, she was awarded the National Institute of Social Sciences Gold Medal for Services to Humanity.

In 1995, Lady Bird received the Golden Plate Award of the American Academy of Achievement.

In November 1968, Columbia Island, in Washington, D.C., was renamed Lady Bird Johnson Park in honor of her campaign as first lady to beautify the capital. In 1976, the Lyndon Baines Johnson Memorial Grove on the Potomac was dedicated on Columbia Island.

Lady Bird declined many overtures to name Austin's Town Lake in her honor after she had led a campaign to clean up the lake and add trails to its shoreline; following her death, Austin Mayor Will Wynn's office said it was a "foregone conclusion that Town Lake is going to be renamed" in honor of Lady Bird Johnson. The lake was renamed Lady Bird Lake on July 26, 2007.

In April 2008, the "Lady Bird Johnson Memorial Cherry Blossom Grove" was dedicated in Marshfield, Missouri. The dedication took place during the city's annual cherry blossom festival. Johnson had supported the rural community and their initiative to plant ornamental cherry trees.

In 1995, she received an Honor Award from the National Building Museum for her lifetime leadership in beautification and conservation campaigns. She was also named the honorary chairwoman of the Head Start program.

Lady Bird held honorary degrees from many universities: Boston University; the University of Alabama; George Washington University; Johns Hopkins University; State University of New York; Southern Methodist University; Texas Woman's University; Middlebury College; Williams College, Southwestern University; Texas State University–San Marcos; Washington College; and St. Edward's University.

On June 7, 2008, Texas honored Lady Bird by renaming the state convention's Blue Star Breakfast as the 'Lady Bird Breakfast'. In January 2009, St. Edward's University in Austin completed a new residence hall for upperclassmen bearing the name of Lady Bird Johnson Hall, or "LBJ Hall" for short.

On August 28, 2008, Lady Bird Johnson High School was opened in her name in San Antonio, Texas, a part of the North East Independent School District.

On October 22, 2012, the United States Postal Service announced the issue of a souvenir Forever stamp sheet honoring Lady Bird Johnson as a tribute to her legacy of beautifying the nation's roadsides, urban parks and trails. Five of the six stamps feature adaptations of stamps originally issued in the 1960s to promote planting in public spaces. The sixth stamp features her official White House portrait, a painting of the First Lady in a yellow gown, by Elizabeth Shoumatoff. The stamps were dedicated on November 30, 2012, at the Lady Bird Johnson Wildflower Center of The University of Texas at Austin.

In 2013, Lady Bird was posthumously awarded the prestigious Rachel Carson Award. The award, presented by Audubon's Women in Conservation, was accepted by her daughter Lynda.

Honorary titles
Preceded by Pat Nixon	Second Lady of the United States; 1961–1963	Vacant Title next held by Muriel Humphrey
Preceded by Jacqueline Kennedy	First Lady of the United States; 1963–1969	Succeeded by Pat Nixon
