= Year of the Monkey (album) =

Studio album by Pushmonkey
- Released: February 15, 2005
- Genre: Rock, nu metal
- Length: 40:16
- Label: Trespass
- Producer: Paul Leary

Pushmonkey chronology
El Bitché (2001)	Year of the Monkey (2005)

Professional ratings
Review scores
Source	Rating
The Austin Chronicle	2.5/5 stars

Year of the Monkey is the fourth studio album by the American band Pushmonkey, released one week after the end of the year of the Monkey, running from January 22, 2004 through February 8, 2005 (see 2005 in music).

== Track listing ==
All songs composed by Pushmonkey

1. "Rescue Me" – 3:26
2. "Stuck Out" – 3:17
3. "Sorry" – 3:12
4. "The Greatest" – 3:40
5. "Too Good to Be True" – 3:49
6. "Falling Out" – 3:20
7. "Fake" – 4:30
8. "10,000 Miles" – 3:48
9. "Lie to Me" – 3:46
10. "Reason to Be Loved" – 3:11
11. "I'm Down" – 4:17

== Credits ==
Pushmonkey

- Tony Park – lead vocals
- Darwin Keys – drums, vocals
- Will Hoffman – guitar, vocals
- Pat Fogarty – bass, vocals
- Howie Behrens – guitar, vocals
