= Matt Bearden =

Matt Bearden at Fun Fun Fun Fest 2008

Matt Bearden is an American comedian, actor, and radio host based in Austin, Texas. He was a member and creative director of Monks' Night Out, an alternative improv and sketch comedy troupe. He played Quinton on the MTV sitcom Austin Stories, created and hosted the comedy showcase PUNCH!, and was a radio host on KLBJ-FM.

== Career ==
=== Improv and acting ===
Bearden graduated from the University of Texas at Austin. In 1995 he became involved in Austin's improv scene, and by 1996 he was the creative director of Monks' Night Out. Following troupe shows at The Velveeta Room, he'd sometimes stay to watch the stand-up comedians. Eventually, he performed stand-up himself.

In 1996, Bearden auditioned for Austin Stories. The show's original cast already knew him from improv, and he got the part of Quinton. Co-creator Brad Pope had seen Bearden perform a Quentin Tarantino impression. The character's name came from that performance. The series was cancelled, and Bearden went to Los Angeles for a short time before coming back to Austin.

In 1998, Bearden emceed two shows at the Big Stinkin' International Improv & Sketch Comedy Festival, one with fellow comedian Howard Kremer. He later appeared in Alex Holdridge's independent film Wrong Numbers, opposite Scoot McNairy. Bearden played James and McNairy played Russell, two underage friends trying to buy beer over the course of a night in Austin. The film won a prize at the Austin Film Festival.

=== Stand-up and PUNCH! ===
Bearden won Cap City Comedy Club's Funniest Person in Austin competition in 2002. He didn't have electricity for three weeks, and needed the $750 prize to pay the overdue bill. During the finals, he watched former Monks' Night Out member and comedian Matt Sadler perform, then rewrote his own set before going onstage. He won, paid the bill, and got his power turned back on. Comedy Central talent staff were among the judges, and the network later featured Bearden.

Bearden toured as a stand-up comedian and worked booking and managing comedy clubs, including The Velveeta Room. In 2008, readers of The Austin Chronicle voted him Best Comedian. That year's Fun Fun Fun Fest presented a different challenge. Wind and noise from a neighboring stage competed with his set, but he kept performing and eventually won the crowd over.

Moontower booked Bearden for several shows in 2013, including a Friday closing set at the Scottish Rite Theater. He returned to the festival in 2018 to host a Stars in Bars show. On June 19, 2020, Comedy Central aired an episode of Stand-Up Featuring devoted to his act.

At Cap City Comedy Club, Bearden created PUNCH!, a weekly showcase built around stand-up comedy. He made room for improv, sketch, and variety acts as well. Local comedians shared the bill with touring performers, and Bearden went to open-mic nights looking for newer talent. Some nights, everyone on the lineup was from Austin. The show was frequently selling out by 2013, even without nationally known comics on the bill. PUNCH! later returned after a two-year hiatus.

=== Radio ===
By 2011, Bearden was a regular on KLBJ-FM's Dudley and Bob morning show, working with Dale Dudley and Bob Fonseca. Dudley handled the current-events discussions, Fonseca weighed in, and Bearden supplied the pointed remarks that became part of their on-air exchanges.

The program later became The Dudley & Bob with Matt Show. KLBJ moved it to afternoons in February 2020. Bearden subsequently hosted Mornings with Matt and Bob alongside Fonseca on KLBJ-FM.
