= El Bitché =

Studio album by Pushmonkey
- Released: September 4, 2001
- Genre: Alternative rock, nu metal, post-grunge
- Length: 48:01
- Label: Trespass

Pushmonkey chronology
Pushmonkey (1998)	El Bitché (2001)	Year of the Monkey (2005)

Professional ratings
Review scores
Source	Rating
Allmusic	2.5/5 stars

El Bitché is the third studio album by the American band Pushmonkey, released in 2001 (see 2001 in music).

== Track listing ==
All songs composed by Pushmonkey

1. "Chemical Skin" – 3:30
2. "Pissant" – 3:15
3. "Woman Named Dope" – 2:53
4. "Mine to Waste" – 3:56
5. "Myself" – 3:24
6. "Carbomb" – 3:34
7. "Thing" – 3:51
8. "Number One" – 3:48
9. "Masterbraker" – 3:47
10. "Diamond" – 4:06
11. Untitled instrumental – 1:21
12. "Core" – 8:20
13. "Tits" – 2:08

== Personnel ==
- Tony Park – lead vocals, trumpet
- Darwin Keys – drums, vocals
- Will Hoffman – guitar, vocals
- Pat Fogarty – bass, vocals
- Howie Behrens – guitar, vocals
