= Bob Sinclair (radio executive) =

American radio executive (1945–2025)

Bob Sinclair Sr.
- Born: Robert Lindsay Sinclair Sr. May 31, 1945; Charleston, West Virginia, U.S.
- Died: April 20, 2025 (aged 79); Bastrop, Texas, U.S.
- Education: Harvard University (AB)
- Occupation: Radio executive
- Years active: 1960s–2025
- Spouses: Lisa Sinclair (m. 1976; died 2024); Lisa Heath
- Children: 5 (including 1 stepdaughter)

Robert Lindsay Sinclair Sr. (May 31, 1945 – April 20, 2025) was an American radio executive and book author who was the owner and leader of Sinclair Telecable (unrelated to Sinclair Broadcast Group) from the 1970s until his death in 2025.

== Early life and career ==
Sinclair was born in Charleston, West Virginia on May 31, 1945, to John and Virginia Sinclair and was the oldest of three siblings. Later on his life, he left his hometown to attend Harvard University, where he later graduated with a bachelor's degree in history.

In the late 1960s, Sinclair joined Sinclair Communications, a radio company founded by his father in 1966.

In 1976, Sinclair moved to Norfolk, Virginia to manage radio station WHNE and would later acquired it for the company, which would later expand across the Hampton Roads area.

== Personal life and death ==
In 1976, Sinclair married Lisa Sinclair (née Merideth; 1950–2024) and had four children. He was an avid golfer and had played on teams in his high school and college years. Sinclair was also a passionate traveler, going to over 100 countries across all seven continents and later wrote about his travels called Around the World in 80 Minutes in 2012.

Later in life, he moved to Texas (around the Austin area).

Sinclair died on April 20, 2025 at his Bastrop, Texas home, at the age of 79, after a five-year bout with cancer. He was survived by his new wife Lisa Heath, children, and eight grandchildren.
