= Pushmonkey (album) =

Studio album by Pushmonkey
- Released: September 15, 1998
- Genre: Rock, nu metal
- Length: 46:39
- Label: Arista

Pushmonkey chronology
Maize (1994)	Pushmonkey (1998)	El Bitché (2001)

Professional ratings
Review scores
Source	Rating
Allmusic	2.5/5 stars

Pushmonkey is the second studio album by the American band Pushmonkey, released in 1998 (see 1998 in music).

== Track listing ==
All songs composed by Pushmonkey

1. "Lefty" – 4:23
2. "Now" – 5:12
3. "No Dumb Wrong" – 3:52
4. "Cut the Cord" – 4:30
5. "Handslide" – 3:25
6. "Caught My Mind" – 3:56
7. "Ashtray Red" – 3:42
8. "Spider" – 3:11
9. "Limitless" – 5:50
10. "Loner" – 4:14
11. "Maybe" – 4:24

== Credits ==
=== Pushmonkey ===
- Tony Park – lead vocals, trumpet
- Darwin Keys – drums, vocals
- Will Hoffman – guitar, vocals
- Pat Fogarty – bass, vocals
- Howie Behrens – guitar, vocals
