= KROX-FM =

Radio station in Texas, United States

Coordinates: 30.322°N 97.801°W

- Buda, Texas; United States
- Broadcast area: Austin metropolitan area
- Frequency: 101.5 MHz
- Branding: 101X

Programming
- Format: Alternative rock

Ownership
- Owner: Sinclair Telecable; (Waterloo Media Group, L.P.)
- Sister stations: KBPA; KLBJ; KLBJ-FM; KLZT

History
- First air date: November 13, 1984 (as KGID Giddings)
- Former call signs: KGID (1984–1990); KOKE (1990–1995)
- Call sign meaning: "Rocks"; the "X" is used in "101'X" brand

Technical information
- Licensing authority: FCC
- Facility ID: 54659
- Class: C2
- ERP: 12,500 watts
- HAAT: 258.1 m (847 ft)

Links
- Public license information: Public file; LMS
- Webcast: Listen live
- Website: www.101x.com

KROX-FM (101.5 MHz) is a commercial radio station licensed to Buda, Texas, United States, and serving the Austin metropolitan area. It is owned by Sinclair Telecable (not related to television broadcaster Sinclair Broadcast Group, who owns CBS station KEYE-TV) and broadcasts an alternative rock format. The station has studios along Interstate 35 in North Austin, and the transmitter site is located off Waymaker Way at the West Austin Antenna Farm.

== History ==
=== KGID Giddings ===
On May 10, 1984, Radio Lee County, Inc. received a construction permit from the Federal Communications Commission (FCC) to build a new FM radio station at 101.7 MHz. It signed on as KGID, licensed to Giddings, Texas.

It broadcast at 3,000 watts, a quarter of its current power, from a tower located between Bastrop and La Grange. That meant it could only cover the southeast communities of the Austin metro area, including the farming communities in and around Lee County. KGID aired a country music format, geared to listeners in this rural area of Texas.

=== KOKE-FM ===
The call sign switched to KOKE on April 6, 1990, changing to a southern gospel format. Radio Lee County received permission from the FCC to switch the frequency to 101.5 MHz, boost the station's effective radiated power to 38,800 watts from a tower at 560 feet in height above average terrain. This would have extended the station's reach into the more lucrative Austin radio market, however, Radio Lee County lacked the money to invest in the new tower and transmitter.

In 1995, Virginia-based Sinclair Telecable bought the station for $2.73 million. It completed the rebuild, switching the call letters to KROX-FM, and moving the studios and offices to Barton Springs Road in Austin.

=== 101X, Austin's New Rock Alternative ===
The new station took the moniker "101X". It signed on as "Austin's New Rock Alternative" on June 8, 1995. Its main competition, at the beginning, was "K-Nack" 107.7 KNNC, the Austin market's original alternative station. Both KROX-FM and KNNC were hampered by poor signals with neither able to achieve significant ratings. KNNC management decided to sell its station in January 1997. The KNNC DJs were dismissed and until July 1997, KNNC simulcast KROX-FM. Eventually, KNNC was sold and became classic rock "107.7 The Hawk". Today it is Latin adult contemporary KLJA.

The original DJs on 101X included Sara Trexler, former KNNC personalities Rachel Marisay and Ray Seggern, LA Lloyd Hocutt, Gibby Haynes, a member of the punk rock group The Butthole Surfers, and Austin Chronicle music critic Andy Langer. The morning show, "Jason and Deb", won the 2014 Austin Chronicle "Best Of" Poll.

In the late 1990s, 101X veered into active rock territory at the height of alternative radio's nu-metal period. It has since returned to a broader alternative presentation, closely associated with the local Austin music scene and today's indie rock. In 1997, the station was sold to LBJS Broadcasting. LBJS was originally owned by the family of "L.B.J." or former President Lyndon Baines Johnson. That put KROX-FM into common ownership with KLBJ-FM, Austin's leading rock station, that specialized in mostly harder-edged classic rock.

In 2003, LBJS Broadcasting sold its radio stations to the Indianapolis-based Emmis Communications, including KROX-FM. Although Sinclair Telecable continued to own 49.9% of the stations, Emmis was the controlling partner until 2019.

In the early 2000s, KROX-FM's city of license changed from Giddings, Texas to Buda, Texas.
