= KSXY =

Radio station in Forestville, California

- Forestville, California; United States
- Broadcast area: Sonoma County
- Frequency: 100.9 MHz (HD Radio)
- Branding: Latino 100.9

Programming
- Language: Spanish
- Format: Contemporary hit radio
- Subchannels: HD2: Adult album alternative

Ownership
- Owner: Wine Country Radio; (B.C. Radio, LLC)
- Sister stations: KRSH; KXTS

History
- First air date: 1996
- Former call signs: KRAZ (1996–1997); KGRP (1997–2001); KXTS (2001–2008)
- Call sign meaning: Sexy (former branding)

Technical information
- Licensing authority: FCC
- Facility ID: 43711
- Class: A
- ERP: 2,500 watts
- HAAT: 156.3 meters (513 ft)
- Transmitter coordinates: 38°44′08.00″N 122°50′55.00″W
- Translator: HD2: 95.5 K238AF (Santa Rosa)

Links
- Public license information: Public file; LMS
- Webcast: Listen live
- Website: latino1009.com

KSXY (100.9 FM, "Latino 100.9") is a Spanish contemporary hit radio formatted radio station licensed to Forestville, California, United States. It is owned by Wine Country Radio.

== History ==
When KSXY began broadcasting operations, the station was at 95.9 MHz and was billed as SEXY 95.9 airing a Top 40 mainstream format.

After the purchase of the station by Sinclair Telecable in 2001, the station moniker was changed from Sexy to Hot and swapped signals with its sister station KRSH and renamed HOT 98.7.

After 2 years airing a rhythmic format, Hot 98.7 changed back to their original mainstream format.

In July 2006, Hot 98.7 changed formats again to Top 40/rhythmic and became Hot 98.7 "Blazin' Hip-Hop and R&B!"

On August 23, 2007, KSXY changed formats once more to rhythmic pop-leaning adult Top 40 and began billing the station as "Y 98.7", with emphasis on 80s, 90s and current music. This format change coincides with the transfer of the station license to Commonwealth Communications, which has been co-owner of the Sinclair Santa Rosa Cluster.

On February 8, 2008, KSXY moved to 100.9 FM in yet another frequency swap, this time with KXTS which took over the 98.7 FM frequency.

In July 2011, KSXY began shifting its direction back to rhythmic Top 40, thus putting it in competition with KHTH after it debuted with a Mainstream Top 40 direction. Some country music was mixed into the rotation in 2015.

On September 8, 2017, KSXY flipped to alternative rock as "Modern Alternative, The 101". The change returned the format to the market after Sinclair dropped the format on KNOB 5 months prior.

On June 26, 2023, KSXY dropped the alternative format and branding and launched Spanish CHR "Latino 100.9".

=== KSXY-HD2 ===
Broadcasts at translator 95.5 K238AF Santa Rosa. the translator went through a whole bunch of different formats each year. It first originally had simulcasted with KRSH 95.9 FM, but in 2011, it flipped to comedy branded as Funny 95.5. Then this was followed with a Religious Christian talk format branded as 95.5 Roka-FM. Then it would again flip this time to soft oldies branded as Vintage 95.5. Then it would go on to flip this time to classical music branded as Classical 95.5. In 2016, the station flipped to Spanish CHR branded as Latino 95.5. On August 21, 2023, the channel/translator changed to carrying adult album alternative KRSH ("95.9 The Krush").

== Former logos ==
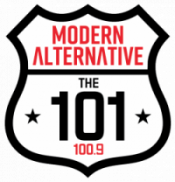
