= Wendy Colonna =

American singer-songwriter

Wendy Colonna is an American singer-songwriter originally from Lake Charles, Louisiana. Her albums include "Girls of Stone" (2000), "Red" (2003), "Right Where I Belong" (2005), "Old New Borrowed & Blue" (2007), "We Are One" (2010), "Nectar" (2013) and "No Moment But Now" (2017).

Colonna's music has been featured as part of Austin's airport's Music in the Air program.
