= KLBJ (AM) =

Radio station in Austin, Texas

- Austin, Texas; United States
- Broadcast area: Austin metropolitan area
- Frequency: 590 kHz
- Branding: News Radio KLBJ

Programming
- Format: News/talk
- Network: Fox News Radio
- Affiliations: Premiere Networks; Westwood One; KTBC

Ownership
- Owner: Sinclair Telecable; (Waterloo Media Group, L.P.)
- Sister stations: KBPA; KLBJ-FM; KLZT; KROX-FM

History
- First air date: August 1, 1939
- Former call signs: KTBC (1939–1973)
- Call sign meaning: Lyndon Baines Johnson (The Johnson family once owned the station.)

Technical information
- Licensing authority: FCC
- Facility ID: 65791
- Class: B
- Power: 5,000 watts days 1,000 watts nights
- Transmitter coordinates: 30°14′16″N 97°37′47″W
- Translator: 99.7 K259AJ (Austin)

Links
- Public license information: Public file; LMS
- Webcast: Listen live
- Website: www.newsradioklbj.com

KLBJ (590 kHz) is a commercial AM radio station in Austin, Texas, airing a news/talk radio format. It is owned by Sinclair Telecable and operates under the name Waterloo Media. It is Central Texas' primary entry point station for the Emergency Alert System.

The station has studios and offices along Interstate 35 in Austin. Its transmitter site is off North Farm to Market Road 973 in Travis County, near the Colorado River. By day, KLBJ operates with 5,000 watts non-directional. To protect other stations on 590 AM from interference, at night it reduces power to 1,000 watts and uses a directional antenna with a four-tower array. It also simulcasts its programming on FM translator station K259AJ at 99.7 MHz.

== History ==
=== Early years as KTBC ===
The station first signed on the air on August 1, 1939. The original call sign was KTBC, standing for the Texas Broadcasting Company. It originally broadcast on 1150 kilocycles, with 1,000 watts.

The station was restricted to daytimer status, required to go off the air at night. It also had to share 1150 AM with WTAW, which was owned by the A&M College of Texas in College Station. The two stations had to work out a schedule where only one of them could broadcast while the other was silent.

=== Johnson Family Ownership ===
KTBC was acquired by the family of future President Lyndon B. Johnson. In 1943, the future First Lady, known as Lady Bird Johnson, invested an inheritance of $17,500 to purchase KTBC. She hired new on-air talent, found commercial sponsors, kept all the financial accounts, and maintained the facility. Using her formal name, Mrs. Claudia T. Johnson served as manager, and then as chairman of what later came to be known as KLBJ for some four decades. In later years, the president and Lady Bird's children ran the media company.

Although Mrs. Johnson was the owner in papers filed with the Federal Communications Commission, then-Congressman Lyndon Johnson used his influence with the FCC to permit KTBC to relocate to AM 590, increasing its coverage area and broadcasting around the clock with nighttime authorization. With its new fulltime status and stronger signal, KTBC became a CBS Radio Network affiliate. It carried the CBS schedule of dramas, comedies, news, sports, soap operas, game shows and big band broadcasts during the "Golden Age of Radio."

The Johnson family put Austin's first TV station on the air in 1952, Channel 7 KTBC-TV. The co-owned station 93.7 KTBC-FM (now KLBJ-FM) signed on the air in 1960. In the 1950s, as network programming moved to television, 590 KTBC began playing middle of the road (MOR) and easy listening music, while still airing CBS News on the hour.

=== Selling the TV and Radio Stations ===
In 1973, the Johnson family sold KTBC-TV to the Times Mirror Company, a newspaper and broadcasting company that published the Los Angeles Times and the Dallas Times Herald. Channel 7 kept the KTBC call sign. Today KTBC is owned by Fox Television Stations. The radio stations' call letters were changed to KLBJ and KLBJ-FM, to match the initials of former President Johnson, who had died earlier that year. The AM station continued its format of MOR music with news, talk, and sports. The year before, the FM station had switched to a progressive rock sound.

In 1997, KLBJ-AM-FM came under the ownership of the LBJS Corporation. The new company was a merger of LBJ Broadcasting, which also owned KAJZ, with Sinclair Telecable's two stations in the market: KROX-FM and KGSR. 590 KLBJ had already shifted from MOR music to an all-talk format. 93.7 KLBJ-FM continued its album-oriented rock format.

At the time, Sinclair Telecable Inc. was a minority stakeholder in the stations, with LBJ Holdings Co. as the 51-percent controlling stakeholder. In 2003, the Indianapolis-based Emmis Communications acquired the controlling stake in the stations; the $150 million sale, completed on July 1, marked the Johnson family's exit from broadcasting.

On October 30, 2009, 590 AM began simulcasting its programming on FM translator station K259AJ at 99.7 MHz. That gave listeners in Austin and its adjacent suburbs the opportunity to hear KLBJ's programming on FM.

In June 2019, Emmis announced that it would sell its controlling stake in the Austin cluster back to Sinclair Telecable for $39.3 million. KLBJ-AM-FM operates under the licensee name "Waterloo Media".

== Programming ==
Weekdays on KLBJ start with The Todd and Oz Show, a local news and interview program with Todd Jeffries and Patrick Osborn. In the afternoon drive time, another local program, The Mark and Melynda Show is heard, featuring Mark Caesar and Melynda Brant. The rest of the weekday schedule is nationally syndicated programs: Brian Kilmeade and Friends, The Clay Travis and Buck Sexton Show, The Will Cain Show, Fox Across America with Jimmy Failla, Coast to Coast AM with George Noory and America in The Morning with John Trout.

Weekends feature shows on financial advice, real estate, health, cars, gardening, and food, some of which are paid brokered programming. Syndicated weekend programming includes The Kim Komando Show, Rich DeMuro on Tech, Somewhere in Time with Art Bell and The Weekend News with Gordon Deal. One of its weekend shows, Retire Smart Austin, also airs on Thursday evenings. Fox News Radio supplies hourly updates. KLBJ has a local news-sharing agreement with the Fox TV Network's KTBC Channel 7, its former sister station.

== Translators ==
Call sign	Frequency	City of license	FID	ERP (W)	HAAT	Class	FCC info
K259AJ	(99.7 MHz) FM	Austin, Texas	82261	250	252 m (827 ft)	D	LMS
