= The Dudley & Bob Show =

Comedic radio talk show

The Dudley and Bob with Matt Show
- Genre: Talk, comedy, entertainment, rock
- Running time: 4 hours, 6 A.M. - 10 A.M. CST
- Country of origin: United States
- Home station: KLBJ-FM Austin, Texas
- Starring: Dale Dudley; Bob Fonseca; Matt Bearden
- Produced by: Eric "Chuy" Alderete
- Original release: 1993 – 2022
- Opening theme: "Intro" by Bob Fonseca
- Website: http://www.klbjfm.com/dudleyandbob
- Podcast: http://www.klbjfm.com/podcast

The Dudley & Bob Show was a weekday morning comedic radio talk show airing on 93.7 KLBJ-FM, from 6:00 to 10:00 am CT in Austin, Texas that consistently ranked among the city's top-rated drive-time shows.

Anchor host Dale Dudley, originally heard on KFMX in Lubbock, Texas, was recruited to Austin's KLBJ-FM to work alongside Clark Ryan as the morning drive-time show partner in the 90s—that lasted for 5 years. When Clark left, promotions director Bob Fonseca was selected to be co-host and partner. The show has had various co-hosts and producers since.

The show featured an open format where Dale Dudley, Bob Fonseca, and Eric "Chuy" Alderete discussed various current-event topics while sharing stories from their personal lives. The show had been on the air for 29 years and was nominated for a NAB Marconi Radio Award in 2007 for Medium Market Personality of the Year by the National Association of Broadcasters. Dudley and Bob were inducted into the Texas Radio Hall of Fame in 2009.

Comedy has a major role on the show - local and touring comedians routinely stop in. It had also created three spin-off shows, Bob's Drive Home, a mostly defunct daily webisode which often recaps and provides video clips of events from within the studio, The Charlie Hodge Halftime Show with Host Charlie Hodge, and co-host Matt "Chicken-wing" Sadler, which no longer airs on KLBJ-FM, and the Taint and Teabag Show, a live one-hour podcast that is distributed by a number of digital audio and video formats.

In March 2013, the Dudley and Bob with Matt Show started a podcast called "The Sideshow." After hundreds of episodes, new episodes were indefinitely put on hold in 2018.

== Staff ==
=== Hosts ===
- Dale Dudley, born August 15, 1961, in Odessa Texas, uses his experiences growing up in West Texas as a recurring topic in the show. He was once known as "The Biggest Poon in Tyler, Texas." Also an actor and member of the Screen Actors Guild, Dudley can be seen in bit part roles in the movies Spy Kids 2 and Bernie, starring Jack Black. He played Eddie Gossling's sidekick in Brothers, Dogs and God. He is the narrator of the audiobook version of Dr. Zimm's Elixir written by Mike Lee. Despite having a serious stuttering problem, Dudley has managed to stay on the radio for over 30 years. Dale Dudley hosted the show Rational Radio with Dale Dudley on the KLBJ FM sister station NewsRadio KLBJ which premiered September 14, 2015 and Dale announced the end of the show on January 24, 2018.

Dale is known for blurring the lines between the perceived and actual realities of his professional, personal, and emotional struggles, oftentimes using histrionics as a comedic tool. Dudley was detained and housed at a mental health facility in late August 2021 after an apparent suicide attempt involving a gun was reported to authorities; a broadcast of the Dudley and Bob show on September 10, 2021 - during which Dudley was noticeably inebriated due to improperly administered dosages of prescription medication - ultimately contributed to the departure of "third chair" host Matt Bearden and the demise of the Dudley and Bob w/ Matt moniker.

Dudley openly lamented the sudden departure of Bearden on-air, citing Bearden's dual commitment to the "Dudley and Bob with Matt Show" and the now defunct afternoon drive-time radio program "Coyote" as a contributing factor.

As such, Dudley regularly equated the time he spent as a disc jockey on KLBJ-AM - an experience he often described as "the worst decision he has ever made" and as "potentially responsible for ruining (his) life" - with Bearden's decision to head multiple radio programs, although this equivalency is dubious. It is unknown if Bearden's departure from the show resulted from his time spent hosting "Coyote".

Dudley described his histrionic musings as "on-air comedic therapy", and often deployed them as a means of reconciling oftentimes erratic, inconsistent and unprofessional behavior with his mental health struggles. His personal life was often put front and center, with close members of his family, including his children, being the focus of many of his running jokes.

On January 4, 2022 Dudley announced on Facebook that he had been fired. Waterloo Media, which owns KLBJ-FM disputes this, stating "it’s just time for the station to try something a little different and Dale’s contract was not renewed."

- Bob Fonseca, or "The BobFather", former promotion director at KLBJ, was selected to replace former drive-time partner Clark, who has been Dudley's sidekick for over 20 years. Bob is also an amateur drone pilot. As a running bit on the show, Bob insinuates that he is infamously under-appreciated by Dale, and regularly mentions this on air. Despite Bob's frequent attempts to steer the dynamic of the show towards a more constructive, positive ethos - oftentimes using off-handed comedy as a means of preventing Dudley from ruminating on uniquely personal, potentially incriminating issues - he is often overlooked as a sidekick.
- Eric, AKA "Chuy", became the lead producer of the show upon Daniel Gallo's departure. He is now a mainstay and a staple of the show. "Chuy" is often ridiculed for abusing marijuana.
- Uncle Dave, is a heroin addict who works for free at KLBJ. Rumors persist that he is patient zero for the forthcoming Hepatitis D epidemic.

=== Former Staff ===
- Matt Bearden, or "Fat Bearden", is the recipient of the 2002 Funniest Person in Austin contest hosted by Cap City Comedy Club. In addition to such prestigious titles, Bearden is the most sought-after comedian in Hawaii. He has appeared not only on stage but also on TV and in film. Matt also hosts his show on KLBJ FM in the afternoons. "Coyote " airs weekdays from 3:00 p.m to 6:00 p.m
- CJ Morgan, AKA "Captain of the High-Keys", helps with the show's digital content but he is also a traitor working in direct competition to Matt Bearden's new afternoon show, "Coyote" on KLBJ FM from 3:00 p.m.- 6:00 p.m.
- Daniel Gallo, AKA "Literal Man", began his relationship with the show as a kid who liked to prank call Dale Dudley. Gallo interned with the show for several years before being hired on as an associate producer. In 2011, he accepted the role of producer. On March 23, 2020, Dale announced on the show that Daniel had been let go by KLBJ FM due to coronavirus-related revenue shortfalls. Daniel discusses this on episode 69 of his podcast OAI Radio.
- Clarissa*
- Pop Cop, a mysterious law enforcement expert who appears on the show occasionally and shares juicy tidbits about pop culture. He is accompanied by a full complement of zoo morning show sound effects and ladies with moistened panties.
- Pop Squirrel, a racist, xenophobic, sexist squirrel who sees Pop Cop as his boss and mentor.

=== Awards ===
- Houston Press Club 2010 Lone Star Awards finalists
- Austin360 A-List 2009–2010, Best Morning Radio Show, Austin Statesman
- Austin Chronicle: Best Morning Show (Dudley and Bob)- 1993-1998
- Texas Radio Hall of Fame

== Podcast ==
In 2011, Dale Dudley and Bob Fonseca started their own podcast series under the nom de guerre of Taint and Teabag Show. The nickname was given to the pair by Bobcat Goldthwaite after a guest appearance on KLBJ-FM. The podcast is to be featured on the Kevin Smith-inspired Smodcast Internet Radio (SIR) and is currently offered as a free download. The podcast is released on an annual schedule. Regular guests include Daniel Gallo and Matt Bearden. The radio show is also available in podcast form on iTunes and the station's website.

== Discography ==
The Dudley & Bob Show produced four albums in the 1990s featuring various calls, bits, and sketches released during the Dudley and Bob with Debra years of the show.

During the 2000s the show produced the "Damn It's Early" albums which featuring live on-air performances from various local and touring national musicians.

Year	Title	Label
1995	Public Enema #1	KLBJ
1996	We're Back and We're Highly Pissed	KLBJ
1997	Eugene! Don't Hit 'Em in the Head	KLBJ
1998	Prince Albert...Your Refrigerator Is Running	KLBJ
2001	Damn It's Early	KLBJ
2003	Damn It's 2 Early	KLBJ

== See also ==
- List of U.S. radio programs
