= KRMY =

Killeen, Texas; United States
- Frequency: 1050 kHz

Programming
- Format: Defunct (was Gospel)

Ownership
- Owner: Martin Broadcasting, Inc.

History
- First air date: 1955; 71 years ago
- Last air date: 2022; 4 years ago
- Former call signs: KLEN (1955–1973); KIXS (1973–1979); KIIZ (1979–1992)

Technical information
- Licensing authority: FCC
- Facility ID: 40490
- Class: D
- ERP: 250 watts day; 5 watts night
- Transmitter coordinates: 31°6′53.00″N 97°42′0.00″W
- Translator: (94.1 MHz) K231DF (Killeen)

Links
- Public license information: Public file; LMS

KRMY (1050 AM) was a radio station broadcasting a Gospel format. It was licensed to Killeen, Texas, United States. The station was last owned by Martin Broadcasting, Inc.

== History ==
The station went on the air as KLEN in 1955. On March 9, 1992, the station changed its call sign to KRMY.

Martin Broadcasting requested the immediate cancelation of KRMY and its translator's licenses on December 23, 2022, which occurred on January 5, 2023.
