= KXTS (FM) =

Radio station in Geyserville, California

- Geyserville, California; United States
- Broadcast area: Sonoma County
- Frequency: 98.7 MHz
- Branding: Exitos 98.7

Programming
- Format: Regional Mexican

Ownership
- Owner: Wine Country Radio; (B.C. Radio LLC)
- Sister stations: KRSH; KSXY

History
- First air date: 1993
- Former call signs: KRSH (1993–2002); KSXY (2002–2008)
- Call sign meaning: Exitos

Technical information
- Licensing authority: FCC
- Facility ID: 72925
- Class: A
- ERP: 2,650 watts
- HAAT: 150 meters (490 ft)
- Transmitter coordinates: 38°44′08″N 122°50′55″W

Links
- Public license information: Public file; LMS
- Webcast: Listen live
- Website: exitos987.com

KXTS (98.7 FM) is a radio station broadcasting a Regional Mexican format. Licensed to Geyserville, California, United States, it serves the Santa Rosa area. The station is currently owned by Wine Country Radio. The station had previously been broadcasting on 100.9 FM until a frequency swap with KSXY on February 8, 2008. The call signs had been swapped the previous week.

The station started out as KRSH (The Krush) until 2002 when it was also involved in a frequency swap with KSXY, known then as Sexy 95.9. KRSH was not involved in the current frequency swap and is still broadcasting on 95.9 FM.
