= KBPA =

Radio station in Austin, Texas

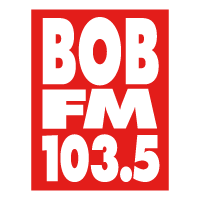
- Austin, Texas; United States
- Broadcast area: Austin metropolitan area
- Frequency: 103.5 MHz (HD Radio)
- Branding: 103.5 Bob FM

Programming
- Format: Adult hits
- Subchannels: HD2: Rhythmic adult contemporary "Vibe 97.1"; HD3: Freeform "Radio Austin"

Ownership
- Owner: Sinclair Telecable; (Waterloo Media Group, L.P.)
- Sister stations: KLBJ; KLBJ-FM; KLZT; KROX-FM

History
- First air date: June 1, 1971
- Former call signs: KRMH (1971–1976); KCSW (1976–1982); KEYI (1982–1986); KEYI-FM (1986–2004)
- Former frequencies: 103.7 MHz (1971–1983)
- Call sign meaning: Bob Plays Anything

Technical information
- Licensing authority: FCC
- Facility ID: 41213
- Class: C1
- ERP: 46,000 watts
- HAAT: 326 meters (1,070 ft)
- Transmitter coordinates: 30.045°N 97.881°W
- Translator: HD2: 97.1 K246BD (Austin)

Links
- Public license information: Public file; LMS
- Webcast: Listen live; HD2: Listen live; HD3: Listen live
- Website: www.1035bobfm.com; HD2: www.1027espn.com; HD3: www.radioatx.com

KBPA (103.5 FM) is a commercial radio station licensed to Austin, Texas, United States, and serving the Austin metropolitan area. Owned by Sinclair Telecable and operated under the name Waterloo Media, it broadcasts an adult hits format. Its studios and offices are located along Interstate 35 in North Austin.

KBPA has an effective radiated power (ERP) of 46,000 watts. The transmitter is off Mount Larson Road in Austin, sharing the same tower as KTBC. KBPA broadcasts using HD Radio technology.

== History ==
=== Good Karma ===
The station signed on the air June 1, 1971, originally at 103.7 FM as KRMH and was licensed to San Marcos, Texas. "Broadcasting from beautiful downtown Buda" - the station was branded as "Good Karma", airing a progressive rock format.

KRMH was owned by Advance Inc., whose president was R. Miller Hicks. It was one of the few stations to broadcast in quadraphonic stereo.

=== Shift to adult contemporary ===
In 1976, the Pioneer Broadcasting Company of Austin, which also owned KNOW (1490 AM), acquired KRMH and shifted it to an adult contemporary format. New call letters, KCSW, took effect on July 26, 1976. Five years later, the station was acquired by Hicks Communications Inc. of Dallas. Upon closing, the call letters were changed to KEYI and the station was rebranded as Key 103, while keeping the adult contemporary format.

In 1983, the station moved from 103.7 FM to 103.5 FM with a power increase to 100,000 watts. Hicks sold the station to Degree Communications for $15.5 million in 1988. The limited partnership restructured, giving GE Capital control three years later. The transaction amounted to receivership; a year later KEYI was sold for $3 million to San Antonio businessman Van Archer, doing business as Mercury Broadcasting.

=== Oldies 103 ===
KEYI flipped to oldies music as "Oldies 103" at the beginning of November 1994, in the wake of Austin's oldies station, KFGI-FM, flipping to hot adult contemporary. Two years later, Clear Channel Communications bought KEYI and KFON AM for $3.1 million. Clear Channel attempted to sell KEYI and 44 other stations, in divestiture action spurred by its merger with AMFM, to Hispanic Broadcasting Corporation in a 2000 deal that was scuttled when the United States Department of Justice denied it over equity ties between Clear Channel and HBC.

Clear Channel then sold KEYI to Secret Communications. Secret owned KEYI less than a year before selling it in 2001 to LBJS Broadcasting Company, a partnership of the LBJ Company and Sinclair Telecable (no relation to Sinclair Broadcast Group). LBJ left radio ownership after six decades by selling its majority interest in the partnership to Emmis Communications in 2004, a $105 million purchase. The new partnership was named Emmis Austin Radio Broadcasting Co., LP.

=== Bob FM ===
In September 2004, KEYI-FM flipped to adult hits as "Bob FM", changing its call letters to KBPA on September 8.

Sinclair Telecable acquired Emmis's stake in its Austin radio stations in June 2019 for $39.3 million. The Federal Communications Commission (FCC) approved the transaction, requiring a waiver since it maintained a grandfathered cluster not permissible under current radio ownership rules.

=== Tower relocation and city of license change ===
In early 2019, Emmis filed with the FCC for a construction permit to relocate the KBPA transmitter site to Austin from its previous location about 30 miles southwest of Austin. The power was decreased to 46,000 watts from the previous 100,000 watts. The station's city of license changed from San Marcos to Austin. The move was part of a multi-station allocation shuffle led by the Educational Media Foundation allowing EMF to add a signal serving the San Antonio metropolitan area on 103.7 MHz, licensed to Balcones Heights. The FCC approved the changes in January 2020. The transmitter relocation and city of license change were completed on March 23, 2021.
