= KLZT =

Radio station in Bastrop, Texas

- Bastrop, Texas; United States
- Broadcast area: Austin metropolitan area
- Frequency: 107.1 MHz (HD Radio)
- Branding: La Z 107.1

Programming
- Format: Regional Mexican
- Subchannels: HD3: Keilah Radio 106.5 (Spanish Christian)

Ownership
- Owner: Sinclair Telecable; (Waterloo Media Group, L.P.)
- Sister stations: KBPA; KLBJ-FM; KLBJ; KROX-FM

History
- First air date: July 7, 1986 (as KLIO-FM)
- Former call signs: KLIO-FM (July–September 1986); KSSR (September 1986–1989); KGSR (1989–2009)

Technical information
- Licensing authority: FCC
- Facility ID: 9973
- Class: C2
- ERP: 49,000 watts
- HAAT: 152 meters (499 ft)
- Transmitter coordinates: 30°7′18.00″N 97°34′47.60″W
- Translator: HD3: 106.5 K293BF (Comanche Trail)

Links
- Public license information: Public file; LMS
- Webcast: Listen live
- Website: www.1071laz.com HD3: www.keilahradio.com

KLZT (107.1 FM) is a radio station broadcasting a Regional Mexican format. Licensed to Bastrop, Texas, United States, the station serves the Austin metropolitan area. The station is owned by Sinclair Telecable (not related to television broadcaster Sinclair Broadcast Group, who owns CBS station KEYE-TV) and operated under the name Waterloo Media. The station is also broadcast on HD radio. It bills itself as La Z 107.1 (Spanish for "The Z 107.1"). The station has studios along Interstate 35 in North Austin, and the transmitter site is located southeast of Austin Bergstrom International Airport.

== History ==
The station went on the air as KLIO-FM on July 7, 1986. On September 9, 1986, the station changed its call sign to KSSR; on April 9, 1989, to KGSR; and on December 9, 2009, to the current KLZT.

As KGSR, a series of lineup changes occurred in 2008–09. KROX program director Lynn Barstow added the program director title during this period that saw the exit of long-time employees Susan Castle, "Big" Jyl Herschman, and Bobby Ray (Eakin). Journalist Andy Langer joined Bryan Beck to form an abbreviated morning show called The Late Show, which aired from 8-10 a.m. Beck held down the 6-8 a.m. slot. Long-time program director (and at that time, content coordinator) Jody Denberg was on-air from 1-6 p.m., and long-time KLBJ-FM music director and air personality Loris Lowe holds the 6 p.m.-midnight shift (as well as being the voice of the station's imaging and between song sweepers).

On November 17, 2009, KDHT began stunting, leading to speculation that it would flip to Talk, but on November 20, 2009, Emmis revealed that KGSR would move over to the 93.3 frequency to start a 10-day simulcast until December 1, when KGSR's former 107.1 FM signal takes a Regional Mexican format as KLZT.

== KLZT-HD2 ==
On May 27, 2021, KLZT-HD2, which is fed on translator K274AX, changed its format from Spanish contemporary hit radio as "Latino 102.7" to rhythmic hot adult contemporary as "102.7 The Vibe".

On January 18, 2022, K274AX changed its format from rhythmic adult contemporary as "The Vibe 102.7" to Spanish CHR as "Mega 102.7".

On July 25, 2022, K274AX changed its format from Spanish CHR to sports, branded as "ESPN 102.7". KLZT-HD2 has since been silent as the translator parent station has moved back to KBPA-HD2

On August 30, 2024, KLZT-HD2 returned to the air with a Spanish CHR format, branded as "Latino 97.1" (simulcast on K246BD 97.1 FM Austin). On October 28, 2024, KLZT-HD2 switched to bilingual adult contemporary, while maintaining the same brand.

On February 21, 2025, KLZT-HD2 changed their format from bilingual AC back to Spanish CHR, still under the "Latino 97.1" branding.

== See also ==
- Music of Austin
