= KRSH =

Radio station in Healdsburg, California

Coordinates: 38.735°N 122.850°W

- Healdsburg, California; United States
- Broadcast area: Santa Rosa, California
- Frequency: 95.9 MHz
- Branding: The Krush 95.9

Programming
- Format: Adult album alternative

Ownership
- Owner: Wine Country Radio; (B.C. Radio LLC)
- Sister stations: KSXY; KXTS

History
- First air date: 1993 (as KHBG)
- Former call signs: KHBG (1993–1999); KSXY (1999–2002)
- Call sign meaning: "Krush"

Technical information
- Licensing authority: FCC
- Facility ID: 16257
- Class: A
- ERP: 2,650 watts
- HAAT: 153 meters (502 ft)

Links
- Public license information: Public file; LMS
- Webcast: Listen live
- Website: www.krsh.com

KRSH (95.9 FM) is a commercial radio station in Healdsburg, California, United States, broadcasting to the Santa Rosa, California area.

KRSH airs an adult album alternative music format branded as "The Krush 95.9". The previous format was Top 40/CHR branded as SEXY 95.9 KSXY.
