= KLBJ-FM =

Radio station in Texas, United States

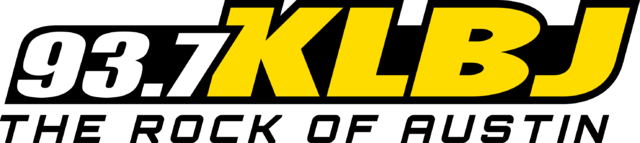
- Austin, Texas; United States
- Broadcast area: Austin metropolitan area
- Frequency: 93.7 MHz (HD Radio)
- Branding: 93.7 KLBJ

Programming
- Format: Mainstream rock
- Subchannels: HD2: Sports "ESPN 102.7"; HD3: Active rock "NO CONTROL Radio" (Heavy Metal)
- Affiliations: Compass Media Networks

Ownership
- Owner: Sinclair Telecable; (Waterloo Media Group, L.P.)
- Sister stations: KBPA; KLZT; KLBJ; KROX-FM

History
- First air date: January 1, 1961
- Former call signs: KTBC-FM (1960–1973)
- Call sign meaning: Lyndon Baines Johnson (The Johnson family are former owners)

Technical information
- Licensing authority: FCC
- Facility ID: 65792
- Class: C
- ERP: 97,000 watts
- HAAT: 320 meters (1,050 ft)
- Transmitter coordinates: 30.3102°N 97.7928°W
- Translator: HD2: 102.7 K274AX (Austin)

Links
- Public license information: Public file; LMS
- Webcast: Listen live; HD2: Listen live
- Website: www.klbjfm.com

KLBJ-FM (93.7 MHz) is a commercial radio station licensed to Austin, Texas, United States, and serving the Austin metropolitan area. It broadcasts a mainstream rock radio format billed as "The Rock of Austin." It is owned by Sinclair Telecable (unrelated to television broadcaster Sinclair Broadcast Group, which owns CBS network affiliate KEYE). KLBJ-FM is licensed under the name Waterloo Media. The station was once owned by the family of President Lyndon Baines Johnson, and still carries his initials as its call letters.

KLBJ-FM has studios and offices along Interstate 35 in North Austin. The transmitter and broadcast tower are atop Austin's Mount Larson. KLBJ-FM broadcasts in the HD Radio format. Its HD-2 digital subchannel airs Sports as "ESPN 102.7". Its HD-3 digital subchannel airs heavy metal music as "No Control Radio."

== History ==
=== The Johnson family ===
The station first signed on the air on January 1, 1961. Its call sign was KTBC-FM, sister station to KTBC (now KLBJ). The radio stations were part of the Johnson family's broadcasting holdings. In 1943, the future First Lady, known as Claudia T. "Lady Bird" Johnson, invested an inheritance of $17,000 to purchase KTBC (AM). She improved the station by hiring new on-air talent, found commercial sponsors, kept all the financial accounts, and maintained the facility. Using her formal name, Mrs. Johnson served as manager and then as the first chairwoman of what later came to be known as KLBJ, for some four decades. (In later years, the president and Lady Bird's children ran the radio stations, while she remained chairman.) Because the stations were owned by Claudia Johnson, Lyndon Johnson did not have to consider divesting the media company, even when he was Senator, Vice President or President.

The Johnson family put Austin's first TV station on the air in 1952, KTBC-TV. The co-owned FM station signed on the air in 1960. In 1972, KTBC-FM switched to a freeform rock format, with a progressive rock sound that was emerging on the FM dial in many cities in America. Until then, the only rock commonly heard on the radio were a few songs that crossed over onto the Top 40 charts.

=== Change in ownership ===
In 1973, the Johnsons sold KTBC-TV to the Times Mirror Company, a newspaper and broadcasting company that published the Los Angeles Times and the Dallas Times Herald. Times Mirror kept the KTBC call sign for the TV station, while the radio stations became KLBJ AM-FM to reflect the initials of President Johnson, who had died earlier that year. (Currently, KTBC-TV is owned by Fox Television Stations.)

In 1997, KLBJ-FM and KLBJ came under the ownership of the LBJS Corporation. The new company was a merger of LBJ Broadcasting, which by this point also owned KAJZ, with Sinclair Telecable's two stations in the market: KROX-FM and KGSR. KLBJ (AM) had already shifted from MOR to a talk radio format, while KLBJ-FM transformed into an album rock format, concentrating on a playlist from the best-selling records.

At the time, Sinclair Telecable Inc. was a minority stakeholder in the stations, with LBJ Holdings Co. as the 51-percent controlling stakeholder. In 2003, the Indianapolis-based Emmis Communications acquired the controlling stake in the stations; the $150 million sale, completed on July 1, marked the Johnson family's exit from broadcasting. Emmis had radio stations in several large markets around the U.S., including New York City and Los Angeles.

In June 2019, Emmis announced that it would sell its controlling stake in the Austin cluster back to Sinclair Telecable for $39.3 million. KLBJ-AM-FM operate under the licensee name "Waterloo Media."

=== The Dudley & Bob Show ===
From 1993 to 2022, "The Dudley & Bob Show" (Dale Dudley, Bob Fonseca and Matt Bearden), was heard in morning drive time on KLBJ-FM. The show is in the Texas Radio Hall of Fame. In 2007, it won a Marconi Award from the National Association of Broadcasters for "Medium Market Personality of the Year."

When Dale Dudley decided to step down, the morning show was renamed "Mornings with Matt and Bob." Producer Eric "Chuy" Alderete is also featured.

== Discography ==
KLBJ-FM has produced a number of albums, focusing mainly on local Austin music. Its "local licks live" series started in 1989 and has showcased dozens of popular Austin musicians.

Year	Title	Series	Label
1990	Local Licks Live 1989	Local Licks Live	KLBJ
1991	Local Licks Live 1990	Local Licks Live	KLBJ
1992	Local Licks Live 1991	Local Licks Live	KLBJ
1993	Local Licks Live 1992	Local Licks Live	KLBJ
1994	Local Licks Live 1993	Local Licks Live	KLBJ
1995	Local Licks Live '94	Local Licks Live	KLBJ
1995	Public Enema #1	Dudley and Bob with Debra calls, bits and sketches	KLBJ
1996	Local Licks Live '95	Local Licks Live	KLBJ
1996	We're Back and We're Highly Pissed	Dudley and Bob with Debra calls, bits and sketches	KLBJ
1997	Local Licks Live '96	Local Licks Live	KLBJ
1997	Eugene! Don't Hit 'Em in the Head	Dudley and Bob with Debra calls, bits and sketches	KLBJ
1998	Local Licks Live '97	Local Licks Live	KLBJ
1998	Prince Albert...Your Refrigerator Is Running	Dudley and Bob with Debra calls, bits and sketches	KLBJ
1999	Local Licks Live '98	Local Licks Live	KLBJ
1999	Local Licks: Yule Rock!	Holiday	KLBJ
2000	Local Licks Live 1999	Local Licks Live	KLBJ
2001	Local Licks Live XII	Local Licks Live	KLBJ
2001	Damn It's Early	Music from The Dudley & Bob Show	KLBJ
2002	Local Licks Live 13	Local Licks Live	KLBJ
2003	Damn It's 2 Early	Music from The Dudley & Bob Show	KLBJ

== See also ==
- Music of Austin
