= W275BK =

Relays WAMJ-HD2, Roswell
- Decatur, Georgia; United States
- Broadcast area: Atlanta metro area (central)
- Frequency: 102.9 MHz
- Branding: Classix 102.9

Programming
- Format: Urban oldies

Ownership
- Owner: Urban One; (Radio One Licenses, LLC)
- Sister stations: WAMJ, WUMJ, WPZE, WHTA

History
- First air date: May 2007

Technical information
- Licensing authority: FCC
- Facility ID: 143866
- Class: D
- ERP: 115 watts
- HAAT: 344 m (1,129 ft)
- Transmitter coordinates: 33°44′41″N 84°21′36″W
- Repeater: 97.5 WUMJ-HD2 (Fayetteville)

Links
- Public license information: Public file; LMS
- Webcast: Listen Live
- Website: myclassixatl.com

W275BK is a radio station translator in Decatur, Georgia. Owned by Urban One, the station simulcasts an urban oldies music format branded as Classix 102.9, as a relay from HD Radio subchannel WAMJ-HD2 in Roswell, Georgia. WAMJ-HD2 is also simulcast on HD Radio subchannel WUMJ-HD2 in Fayetteville, Georgia.

== History ==
=== Conflicts ===
In 2009, the station was assigned to WWVA-FM 105.7, allowing it to circumvent the prohibition on airing original programming by having it simulcast on an HD Radio channel on WWVA. On April 4, it became hip-hop Streetz 102.9, but went silent a few days later when the person responsible for the new station, the former head of the Radio One Atlanta station group, was sued by Radio One for allegedly using his former position to take the group's intellectual property (including remixes) and violating a non-compete clause.

The translator was started by Radio Assist Ministry and was granted a construction permit in late May 2004 as W223AO on 92.5 MHz. It does not appear to have gone on-air until 2007, when it finally received a broadcast license to cover, and supposedly relayed Georgia Public Broadcasting station WJSP-FM 88.1 (apparently without permission). In August 2008, it changed to W222BE/92.3, and then under an engineering-related special temporary authorization filed the day after it got its license for this, changed a month later to its current callsign and frequency. It was almost immediately sold to Extreme Media Group, which is owned and run by one of the two people previously involved with Radio One. In early 2009, it went on-air relaying WCLK/91.9.

Another local station which airs its own programming, W250BC/97.9, was also started by RAM and then sold to EMG. It traded the station to Cumulus Media in exchange for another one. Because of that station being involved with EMG, Cumulus was also named in the lawsuit, though there was no injunction preventing that station from operating.

The station was located on one of the two towers near Edgewood. It was authorized to transmit 110 (previously 170) watts at 207 meters (679 ft) HAAT, but as of March 2012, it was still off-air. Its calculated broadcast range is roughly the same as the area within Interstate 285, but offset a few miles or several kilometres to the southeast.

In December 2009, the lawsuit was resolved such that this translator was transferred to Radio One (via ROA Licenses LLC, meaning Radio One Atlanta) in February 2010, giving it a fifth radio station in Atlanta, as the U.S. Federal Communications Commission (FCC) allows translators to ignore the restrictions on excessive concentration of media ownership in a media market. Although the license transferred had not yet been FCC-approved, the translator was assigned per the consent decree to parent station WAMJ FM 107.5, owned by Radio One.

=== Subsequent history ===
In January 2010, the station applied for and was granted a construction permit to increase to 160 watts at 303 meters (994 ft), and relocate west to the WUPA TV 43 (69.1) tower in the Inman Park neighborhood of Atlanta. It submitted an application for a license to cover the permit in early April 2010, and within a few days started transmitting WHTA FM 107.9, which is also carried on WAMJ's HD Radio channel 2. As is common in radio broadcasting, this may or may not have been the radio format that the station's owners intended to use long-term, but rather one intended to mislead competitors. As of June 2012 however, it was still broadcasting WHTA, thus it appeared the only purpose of the station is to cause radio tuners doing a channel scan to stop immediately before getting to competitor V-103 (WVEE FM 103.3), two channels (0.4 MHz) directly above the "translator".

In late June 2012, the format and voiceovers of Streetz 102.9 returned to W233BF as "Streetz 94-5". In early July 2012, W275BK switched from airing "Hot 107-9" (WHTA FM 107.9) to Praise 102.5 (WPZE), while still listing WAMJ as the primary station, both with the FCC and in the required hourly station IDs. The hourly ID lists all three stations (WPZE, WAMJ HD2, and W275BK) at every hour, rather than omitting the translator's callsign except for certain required times as other stations do. The station does not extend the coverage of WPZE.

On November 25, 2014, at 5 p.m., W275BK broke from the WPZE simulcast and flipped to the rapidly expanding classic hip hop format, branded as "Boom 102.9." The station is still being simulcast on WAMJ-HD2. This marks the third station in the market with the format, after WTZA (and FM translator W257DF 99.3) and W250BC (WWWQ-HD3) flipped within a week of each other. On December 22, 2017, at Noon, after playing "Christmas Rappin'" by Kurtis Blow, the station flipped to urban oldies as Classix 102.9, with the first song being "Let's Stay Together" by Al Green; the station added the Tom Joyner Morning Show the following month after having been dropped by WALR-FM in November 2017, as well as The D.L. Hughley Show for afternoons.

In the northern and eastern suburbs, the station is often overwhelmed by WDUN-FM 102.9 in Gainesville, Georgia. Overnight temperature inversions cause cooler air to settle in the Chattahoochee River valley, which then traps and directs the signal southwestward toward the metro area. Seeing the signal problems in this area, Radio One started simulcasting W275BK's format on WUMJ on January 10, 2016, as the recent signal upgrade of WAMJ in 2013 resulted in most listeners moving to the latter frequency, making 97.5 expendable. However, WUMJ would return to simulcasting WAMJ on July 29, 2016.
