= WNTX =

Radio station in Fredericksburg, Virginia

Currently silent
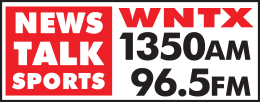
- Fredericksburg, Virginia; United States
- Broadcast area: Metro Fredericksburg
- Frequency: 1350 kHz
- Branding: WNTX 1350 AM

Programming
- Format: News/talk/sports
- Affiliations: Fox News Radio; ESPN Radio; Compass Media Networks; Premiere Networks

Ownership
- Owner: Connoisseur Media; (Alpha Media Licensee LLC)
- Sister stations: WFLS-FM; WVBX; WWUZ

History
- First air date: July 15, 1960 (as WFLS)
- Former call signs: WFLS (1960–1996); WYSK (1996–2011)

Technical information
- Licensing authority: FCC
- Facility ID: 65640
- Class: D
- Power: 1,000 watts (day); 37 watts (night)
- Transmitter coordinates: 38°18′46.46″N 77°26′18.94″W
- Translator: 96.5 W243BS (Fredericksburg)

Links
- Public license information: Public file; LMS

WNTX (1350 AM) is a radio station licensed to Fredericksburg, Virginia, serving metro Fredericksburg. WNTX is owned and operated by Connoisseur Media, through licensee Alpha Media Licensee LLC. It broadcast a news/talk and sports format prior to going silent in 2026.

== History ==
The station was founded, and initially owned and operated by, The Free Lance–Star newspaper as WFLS. It began broadcasting on July 15, 1960. WFLS AM simulcast with WFLS-FM until 1996, when the calls were changed to WYSK and it started simulcasting WYSK-FM.

On July 5, 2011, WYSK began carrying Glenn Beck, Rush Limbaugh and Sean Hannity talk shows during the day. On July 15, 2011, WYSK changed its call letters to WNTX.

On January 23, 2015, Alpha Media "entered into a definitive agreement" to purchase WNTX and sister stations WFLS-FM, WVBX, and WWUZ from Free Lance-Star License, Inc. The purchase was consummated on May 1, 2015, at a price of $8.1 million. Alpha Media merged with Connoisseur Media on September 4, 2025. Connoisseur took WNTX silent on November 1, 2026, due to financial reasons while it considered the future of the station; at the time of the closure, its lineup was a hybrid of conservative talk and ESPN Radio prgramming.

== Translator ==
In February 2010, WYSK began simulcasting on FM translator W243BS at 96.5 FM. On April 16, 2013, W243BS dropped its simulcast of WNTX for a simulcast of WFLS-FM HD2 carrying a freeform format. The "FredFM" format was dropped in early March 2014, when W243BS resumed simulcasting WNTX.

Broadcast translator for WNTX
Call sign	Frequency	City of license	FID	ERP (W)	HAAT	Class	Transmitter coordinates	FCC info
W243BS	96.5 FM	Fredericksburg, Virginia	142774	250	86 m (282 ft)	D	38°18′46.5″N 77°26′18.9″W	LMS
