= WHTA =

- Hampton, Georgia; United States
- Broadcast area: Metro Atlanta
- Frequency: 107.9 MHz (HD Radio)
- Branding: Hot 107.9

Programming
- Language: English
- Format: Mainstream urban
- Subchannels: HD2: WAGA-TV FoxLocal content

Ownership
- Owner: Urban One; (Radio One Licenses, LLC)
- Sister stations: WAMJ; WPZE; WUMJ

History
- First air date: October 19, 1973
- Former call signs: WCRY-FM (1978–1981); WPEZ (1981–2001); WEGF (2001)
- Call sign meaning: Hotlanta, a common nickname for Atlanta

Technical information
- Licensing authority: FCC
- Facility ID: 52548
- Class: C2
- ERP: 35,000 watts
- HAAT: 177 meters (581 feet)
- Transmitter coordinates: 33°29′24.4″N 84°34′6.7″W

Links
- Public license information: Public file; LMS
- Webcast: Listen live
- Website: hotspotatl.com

WHTA (107.9 FM) is a commercial radio station licensed to Hampton, Georgia. The station is owned by Urban One, and serves the Metro Atlanta area with a mainstream urban radio format. WHTA's studios and offices are located inside the Centennial Tower building in downtown Atlanta, and its transmitter is off Swanson Road in Tyrone, Georgia, about 30 miles south southwest of Atlanta.

== History ==
=== WCRY-FM Macon ===
The station began as WCRY-FM in Macon, Georgia, about 85 miles (137 km) south of Atlanta. It signed on the air on October 19, 1973, and was owned by Central Georgia Broadcasting. At first, it mostly simulcast its AM counterpart, WCRY at 900 kHz (now WYPZ). By the late 1970s, WCRY-FM was airing a beautiful music format. In 1981, it switched its call sign to WPEZ, playing easy listening music, powered at 100,000 watts. It later shifted to soft adult contemporary music as "Lite Rock" WPEZ. The station was later known as Z108 in the mid-1980s, which was one out of two stations using the "Z" name in the Macon market, with the other being WQBZ.

The station was acquired in 1996 by U.S. Broadcasting, which had plans to move it into the more lucrative Atlanta radio market. To gain Federal Communications Commission (FCC) approval, a few stations in Middle Georgia were relocated: WPEZ's soft AC format was switched from 107.9 to an existing frequency at 93.7 in Jeffersonville, while the original Top 40 format on 93.7 was shifted to a new Macon-area station as WMGB at 95.1 MHz. U.S. Broadcasting petitioned the FCC to reallocate the broadcast license for 107.9 from Macon to Hampton.

With the FCC giving its OK, Radio One, a large minority-owned broadcasting company, paid $60 million for the new "move in" Atlanta-area station at 107.9. Radio One already owned a station in the Atlanta market, 97.5 WHTA, in Fayetteville, airing an urban contemporary format. WHTA had signed on as an urban station on July 17, 1995; Radio One had plans to put WHTA's call letters and format on its new acquisition.

=== WHTA Hot 107.9 ===
At first, Radio One did not want its competitors in Atlanta to figure out its game plan, so in September 2001, the new Atlanta-area 107.9 transmitter signed on as WEGF "107.9 the End" with a modern rock format. Stunting on its first day, it played "Smooth Criminal" by Alien Ant Farm and "Rollin'" by Limp Bizkit continuously.

After several weeks with the rock format on 107.9 FM, "Hot 97.5" morning host Ryan Cameron made an announcement that "Hot" was moving to 107.9, revealing that the rock format was a publicity stunt. WHTA officially switched frequencies on November 1, 2001, and became "Hot 107.9", while 97.5 became WPZE, playing urban gospel music. (WPZE later moved to 102.5 MHz in Mableton.)

WHTA's move to 107.9 gave it a stronger signal over Intown Atlanta and surrounding suburbs, despite being considered a "move-in" station.

Residents in Tyrone near the station's transmitter site complained to the FCC regarding electrical interference to personal devices, and Urban One increased the antenna's height with FCC permission to address the issue, though some interference does remain.

=== Digital Hip Hop ===
On July 31, 2007, WHTA began using a new slogan, "Hot 107.9, Your Digital Hip Hop Station".

In October 2008, WHTA became the Atlanta network affiliate of the Rickey Smiley Morning Show. It was originally based at co-owned KBFB in the Dallas/Fort Worth Metroplex. In 2011, WHTA became the flagship station for the show, and thus was the only radio station that was featured for the entire run (including as a pilot) of Dish Nation, a syndicated program revolving around radio morning shows that aired on television from that year until its 2025 cancellation.

In 2011, Radio One changed several of its Atlanta-area stations' formats and call signs; WAMJ moved from 102.5 to 107.5, and began simulcasting its Urban AC format on 97.5 as WUMJ, while WPZE's urban gospel format moved from 97.5 to 102.5. That left WHTA as the only station in Radio One's Atlanta cluster that was unaffected by the change.

Radio One was renamed Urban One on May 8, 2018.

== HD Radio ==
On February 6, 2025, WHTA announced that it would simulcast WAGA-TV's online streaming channel (as part of Fox Television Stations's FoxLocal platform) on its second HD Radio channel. The channel features live simulcasts of WAGA-TV's news and sports programming, the talk show Portia, and replays of WAGA's newscasts, excluding national Fox entertainment and sports content.
