= KSOC =

KSOC may refer to:

- KSOC (FM), a radio station (94.5 FM) licensed to serve Tipton, Oklahoma, United States
- KZMJ, a radio station (94.5 FM) licensed to serve Gainesville, Texas, United States, which held the call sign KSOC from 2002 to 2017
- Korean Sport & Olympic Committee
