= WKJM =

Radio station in Petersburg, Virginia

Simulcasts WKJS, Richmond
- Petersburg, Virginia; United States
- Broadcast area: Petersburg, Virginia; Colonial Heights, Virginia; Chesterfield, Virginia
- Frequency: 99.3 MHz (HD Radio)
- Branding: 99.3 and 105.7 Kiss FM

Programming
- Format: Urban adult contemporary
- Subchannels: HD2: WCDX simulcast
- Affiliations: Compass Media Networks

Ownership
- Owner: Urban One; (Radio One Licenses, LLC)
- Sister stations: WCDX; WKJS; WPZZ; WDCJ; WXGI

History
- First air date: October 1, 1966
- Former call signs: WSSV-FM (1967–1973); WPLZ (1973–1986); WPLZ-FM (1986–2001); WPZE-FM (2001); WRHH (2001–2003); WPZZ (2003–2004)
- Call sign meaning: Kiss / James River

Technical information
- Licensing authority: FCC
- Facility ID: 60477
- Class: A
- ERP: 6,000 watts
- HAAT: 100 meters (330 ft)
- Transmitter coordinates: 37°14′1.5″N 77°22′34.9″W

Links
- Public license information: Public file; LMS
- Webcast: Listen live
- Website: kissrichmond.com

WKJM (99.3 FM) is an urban adult contemporary formatted broadcast radio station licensed to Petersburg, Virginia, United States, serving Petersburg, Colonial Heights, and Chesterfield in Virginia. WKJM is owned and operated by Radio One. The station's studios and offices are located just north of Richmond proper on Emerywood Parkway in unincorporated Henrico County, and its transmitter is located in Petersburg.

== History ==
The station dates back to October 1, 1966, when it signed on as Petersburg based WSSV-FM, and simulcast the Top 40 format of sister station WSSV. In 1970, then-owner Roger Bean, in order to concentrate on his more profitable cable TV operations, decided to sell the radio stations. WSSV AM/FM were then purchased by Eure Communications, headed by William L. Eure. In 1973, responding to changes in FCC regulations regarding AM/FM simulcasts, the FM station began a separately programmed automated beautiful music format under the call letters WPLZ, with the slogan "Music To Please".

In 1979, the station switched formats to automated Top 40 as "99Z FM". In 1981, seeing that there was not an urban station on the FM band in Central Virginia (which had at that time only been served by four weak AM stations in Richmond), the station flipped formats once again, and became the first urban-formatted FM in Central Virginia as "Magic 99FM".

In 1986, Eure Communications sold WPLZ and WSSV to Paco-John Broadcasting, headed by Philadelphia attorney Glenn Mahone, for $6.5 million.

In November 1987, WCDX, which had been through two previous unsuccessful formats, changed to an urban format. WCDX's stronger signal in Richmond caused WPLZ's ratings to drop. Paco-John, to compensate, purchased the 99.3 frequency in Fredericksburg and became a simulcast on both 99.3 frequencies, which brought WPLZ's programming in the northern areas of the Richmond Metro, including Hanover County and parts of Henrico. This simulcast, for a time, gave not only Fredericksburg an Urban station, but Charlottesville one as well.

By the early 1990s, despite the simulcasting, WPLZ was unable to regain its lead over WCDX. Paco-John attempted to expand its holdings by attempting to purchase WMYK in Norfolk, then later WGH-AM/FM. In both cases, the company was unable to secure financing for the purchases and the sales were cancelled. Paco-John later went into bankruptcy and the stations were put under control of a trustee named Charles Giddens.

Both of the 99.3 stations were sold (the 99.3 frequency in Fredericksburg is now rhythmic WVBX), and in May 1992, WCDX's owner Sinclair Telecable ended up purchasing WPLZ and its AM sister station, which by this time had become gospel WGCV (it is now classic hip hop-formatted WDCJ), moving the studio's and offices out of Petersburg to their current location on Emerywood Parkway in Richmond. At first, WPLZ's format was adjusted to urban AC, but in December 1998, it switched to urban oldies as "Magic 99 FM". By the end of the 1990s, Radio One had purchased not only WPLZ and WGCV, but also WCDX, WJRV, WARV, and WKJS.

In March 2001, Radio One moved WPLZ and its urban oldies format to 105.7, while simulcasting with 99.3. A month later, a gospel format debuted on 99.3 as WPZE. Getting advance warning of a format flip to urban getting ready to happen on Clear Channel's WRCL, on June 9, 2001, Radio One flipped 99.3 to urban as WRHH, "Hot 99.3", just one day ahead of the 106.5 format flip. On December 3, 2003, 99.3 switched back to a gospel format as WPZZ, "Praise 99.3".

On November 18, 2004, the "Praise" format moved to 104.7 FM, with 99.3 joining in a simulcast with 105.7 FM and adopted an urban AC format as "Kiss FM".

== WKJM-HD2 ==
WKJM-HD2 broadcasts a simulcast of its sister station WCDX on its HD2 sub channel. The simulcast began on November 17, 2015. This also feeds an FM Translator at 104.1 FM (W281AW). This extends the range of WCDX to the Petersburg area.
