= WAMJ =

Radio station in Roswell, Georgia, United States

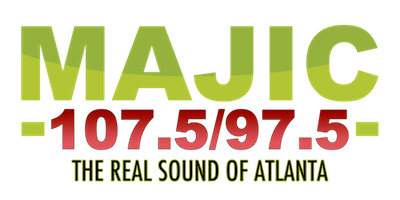
- Roswell, Georgia; United States
- Broadcast area: Metro Atlanta
- Frequency: 107.5 MHz (HD Radio)
- Branding: Majic 107.5/97.5

Programming
- Language: English
- Format: Urban adult contemporary
- Subchannels: HD2: Classix 102.9 (Urban oldies)
- Affiliations: Compass Media Networks; Premiere Networks

Ownership
- Owner: Urban One; (Radio One Licenses, LLC)
- Sister stations: WHTA; WPZE; WUMJ

History
- First air date: February 6, 1998
- Former call signs: WTHA (1996–1998); WAMJ (1998–2001); WJZZ-FM (2001–2009)
- Call sign meaning: Atlanta's Majic

Technical information
- Licensing authority: FCC
- Facility ID: 31872
- Class: C2
- ERP: 33,000 watts
- HAAT: 185 meters (607 ft)
- Transmitter coordinates: 33°55′1.4″N 84°12′5.7″W
- Translator: HD2: 102.9 W275BK (Decatur)
- Repeaters: 97.5 WUMJ (Fayetteville); HD2: 97.5 WUMJ-HD2 (Fayetteville)

Links
- Public license information: Public file; LMS
- Webcast: Listen live
- Website: www.majicatl.com

WAMJ (107.5 FM, "Majic 107.5/97.5") is a commercial radio station licensed to Roswell, Georgia, and serving Metro Atlanta. It airs an urban adult contemporary radio format, simulcasting with sister station 97.5 WUMJ in Fayetteville. The station is currently owned by Radio One, via licensee Radio One Licenses, LLC. The studios and offices are located inside the Centennial Tower building in downtown Atlanta.

WAMJ's transmitter is on Goshen Springs Road in the Gwinnett Village section of Norcross, near Interstate 85. It has an effective radiated power (ERP) of 18,000 watts horizontal and 33,000 watts vertical, broadcasting from a tower at 185 meters (607 feet) in height above average terrain (HAAT). This gives WAMJ a good signal in Atlanta and its northern suburbs, but may not be received well south of Atlanta. To expand their coverage area, WAMJ simulcasts on WUMJ, with its tower located in Tyrone.

WAMJ broadcasts in HD Radio hybrid format. Its HD2 subchannel carries urban oldies music, known as "Classix 102.9", and is rebroadcast on 125 watt FM translator W275BK at 102.9 MHz in Decatur.

== Programming ==
Weekdays begin with the nationally syndicated "Steve Harvey Morning Show." Maria Moore is heard middays, Ryan Cameron afternoons, Jerard J nights and Big Ray overnight.

== History ==
=== WTHA/first incarnation of WAMJ ===
The station is the result of Federal Communications Commission (FCC) Docket 80-90, which reduced the required spacing between FM stations. That rule permitted a new FM station in the Atlanta area on 107.5 MHz. The original call sign was WTHA when the construction permit was issued at the beginning of October 1996. The original plan was to create a simulcast partner for 97.5 WHTA, with the new 107.5 using similar call letters.

By the time it signed on the air on February 6, 1998, it became "Majic 107.5", broadcasting an R&B format with the WAMJ call sign. This was the original incarnation of WAMJ and the "Majic" brand which, at first, lasted only three years.

=== Smooth jazz WJZZ-FM ===
On June 27, 2001, that format and the WAMJ call sign were sent to also-new 102.5 FM as "Grown Folks Radio". At the same time, 107.5 became WJZZ-FM "Smooth Jazz 107.5". The WHTA call letters were moved to "Hot 107.9" a couple of months later, with all three stations owned by Radio One.

The on-air jingles heard on WJZZ-FM were similar to those heard on Clear Channel-owned smooth jazz stations, such as WSMJ in Baltimore, WNUA in Chicago, KKSF in San Francisco, and WJJZ in Philadelphia. However, the WJZZ-FM jingles used an opposite order of frequency and call letters. For WJZZ-FM, the frequency preceded the call sign.

The smooth jazz format enjoyed a long era of success in the Atlanta radio market. Before smooth jazz came to 107.5 in 2001 for nine years, it had a six-year run on WJZF (now WALR-FM) from 1994 to 2000.

=== Return of "Majic 107.5" ===
On January 28, 2009, WJZZ dropped smooth jazz, and returned to an urban AC format, resurrecting the original branding "Majic 107.5". On February 16, 2009, the "Praise 97.5" format and WPZE call sign was moved to 102.5 FM. The 97.5 facility then began simulcasting WJZZ-FM as "Majic 107.5 | 97.5" (and would adopt the WUMJ call letters).

After seven and a half years at 102.5, the WAMJ call sign returned to 107.5 on February 27, 2009. In light of the move, the old WAMJ moniker from its 102.5 days, "Grown Folks Radio," was dropped.

=== Atlanta's Best Mix of R&B ===
The call letter switch to WAMJ also led to a change in slogans to "Atlanta's Best Mix of R&B". This became the third incarnation of the urban AC format for WAMJ.

With the format shuffle, WAMJ incorporated more 1980s and 1990s R&B into its playlist. This led competitor WALR-FM to adjust its Urban Oldies format to more recent adult music to maintain a competitive edge. WAMJ became the Atlanta home for the nationally syndicated Steve Harvey Morning Show; this was in contrast to most of Radio One's Urban AC stations, which instead ran the Tom Joyner Morning Show.

WUMJ received a signal upgrade in 2013, going from 21,300 watts to 50,000 watts. The simulcast with 97.5 ended on January 10, 2016, as WUMJ's signal now overlapped with WUMJ's coverage area. However, WUMJ resumed its simulcast with WAMJ on July 29, 2016, when some listeners told management that they were not able to receive 107.5 MHz clearly.
