= KRNB =

Radio station in Decatur, Texas

Coordinates: 33.387°N 97.566°W

- Decatur, Texas; United States
- Broadcast area: Dallas–Fort Worth metroplex
- Frequency: 105.7 MHz
- Branding: 105.7 RNB

Programming
- Language: English
- Format: Urban adult contemporary
- Affiliations: Premiere Networks

Ownership
- Owner: Urban One; (Radio One Licenses, LLC)
- Sister stations: KKDA-FM, KBFB

History
- First air date: 1996
- Call sign meaning: Rhythm and Blues

Technical information
- Licensing authority: FCC
- Facility ID: 9747
- Class: C
- ERP: 93,000 watts
- HAAT: 576 meters (1,890 ft)

Links
- Public license information: Public file; LMS
- Webcast: Listen live
- Website: krnb.com

KRNB (105.7 MHz), branded 105.7 RNB, is an urban adult contemporary–formatted radio station in the Dallas–Fort Worth metroplex, owned by Urban One alongside sister stations KBFB and KKDA-FM. Its studios are located in Arlington, Texas and the station's transmitter is located north of its city of license, Decatur, Texas. In addition to its format, it is the DFW affiliate of The Steve Harvey Morning Show and it carries a quiet storm program at night.

== History ==
KRNB was first launched at 6 a.m. on September 16, 1996, with an Urban Adult Contemporary format playing R&B music, hence the call sign. (Coincidentally, it is the western reflection of an R&B station in Philadelphia called WRNB.) At the time, its only other competitor for the rest of the decade was KRBV (now KJKK), which went off the air as an R&B station in 1998 due to a transmitter problem that caused low ratings. In the early years of the station, it was home to The Tom Joyner Morning Show until 2002, when new competitor KSOC took over the affiliation to the show. (This marked the second station Tom Joyner DJ'ed in the Metroplex, as he worked at KKDA-FM before.)

After KRBV changed formats, KRNB was the sole Urban AC for two years. However, due to its transmitter location, it was easier to pick up in the northern and western portions of the Metroplex, but harder to pick up in the Southern and Eastern portions, especially in the southern half of Dallas and downtown Dallas. In 2002, KSOC changed formats from Jammin' Oldies to Urban AC; as a result, KRNB modified its format to R&B Oldies by playing only R&B music from the 1970s to the 1980s, and changed its branding from 105.7 KRNB to Old School 105.7. The modification did not last long; KRNB reverted to Urban AC in 2005, changed the name back to 105.7 KR&B ("&" in place of "N") and became the home of The Steve Harvey Morning Show through Premiere Radio Networks, a division of Clear Channel. (Before that, Harvey used to have a morning show on KBFB by syndicate of sister station KKBT in Los Angeles). In 2010, KRNB rebranded to "Smooth R&B 105.7" while keeping its current format. Harvey's morning show was dropped in September 2018 in favor for a local morning show called "The Morning Rush" hosted by comedian Rudy Rush and reality TV personality and model Claudia Jordan. However, in November 2019, "The Morning Rush" was canceled, and The Steve Harvey Morning Show returned. Like many Urban AC stations across the country, KRNB has a nighttime Quiet Storm show.

KRNB's current on-air personalities include Rudy Rush, Claudia Jordan, Sean Andre, Keith Solis, Lynne Haze and Janet G.

Smooth R&B 105.7 logo used from 2010 to 2026.

Since 2002, it has competed with KSOC (for a time branded as "K-Soul" from 2002 to 2011 and again in 2014; and as "Old School 94.5" from 2011 to 2014) with an Urban AC format. However, as of November 15, 2014, KSOC flipped to classic hip hop, leaving KRNB as the sole Urban AC station in the Metroplex until September 11, 2017, when KSOC (later KZMJ and now KFZN) returned to Urban AC as "Majic 94.5". As a result of Urban One selling KZMJ (now KFZN) to Encouragement Media Group, that station was flipped to Spanish Christian music as "Fuzión" on July 7, 2026, leaving KRNB as the only Urban AC station in DFW again.

On May 1, 2026, it was announced that KRNB and urban contemporary sister KKDA-FM would be sold to Silver Spring, Maryland-based Urban One, while also selling KZMJ to Encouragement Media Group, a company focusing on Christian formats. The KZMJ sale was completed on July 7 and the KKDA-FM and KRNB purchase was completed on July 17.

On October 5, 2026, after 16 years, KRNB has retired the "Smooth R&B" name and changed to a simpler branding and logo as "105.7 RNB", replicating the ident of its Philadelphia sister Urban AC station WRNB. From that point, KRNB has adjusted its playlist to focus on R&B music from the 1990s to present day.

== Former KRNB ==
The original KRNB-FM was a tribal run student radio station in Neah Bay, Washington. Starting in 1976 the station provided news, weather and information for the Makah Indian Tribe. Located on the high school campus it was billed as "The Native American Voice of the Pacific Northwest" and operated at 10 watts with an international reach extreme southern Vancouver Island in Canada just across the Strait of Juan de Fuca. The station broadcast a wide range of formats including easy listening, contemporary 70s pop and at night album oriented rock. In 1982, the KRNB call letters surfaced in Memphis, Tennessee as "Magic 101" an R&B station, now KJMS.

== Signal ==
Unlike most of the area's FM stations like sister stations KBFB and KKDA-FM, which transmit their signals from Cedar Hill, KRNB transmits its signal from an unincorporated area East of Alvord in Wise County. Therefore, KRNB's signal is much stronger in the Northwestern parts of the Dallas/Fort Worth metroplex as well as the cities of Decatur, Bowie, Gainesville, and Sherman, to as far north as South of Ardmore, Oklahoma, but is considerably weaker in Dallas and areas Southeast of the city itself, causing problems for its listeners.
