= WVBX =

Radio station in Spotsylvania, Virginia

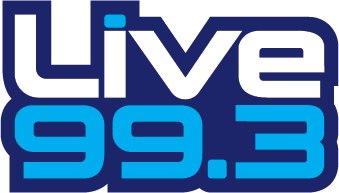
- Spotsylvania, Virginia; United States
- Broadcast area: Fredericksburg, Virginia
- Frequency: 99.3 MHz
- Branding: Live 99-3

Programming
- Format: Contemporary hit radio
- Affiliations: Compass Media Networks; Premiere Networks

Ownership
- Owner: Connoisseur Media; (Alpha Media Licensee LLC)
- Sister stations: WFLS-FM; WNTX; WWUZ

History
- First air date: January 26, 1988
- Former call signs: WYND-FM (1988–1989); WPLC (1989–1994); WYSK (1994–1996); WYSK-FM (1996–2008); WWVB-FM (2008–2009)
- Call sign meaning: Vibe (previous branding)

Technical information
- Licensing authority: FCC
- Facility ID: 22484
- Class: A
- ERP: 3,000 watts
- HAAT: 100 meters (330 ft)
- Transmitter coordinates: 38°8′30.5″N 77°41′33″W

Links
- Public license information: Public file; LMS
- Webcast: Listen live; Listen live (via Audacy); Listen live (via iHeartRadio)
- Website: www.live993.com

WVBX (99.3 FM Live 99-3) is a commercial radio station licensed to Spotsylvania, Virginia and serving the Metro Fredericksburg area. WVBX is owned and operated by Connoisseur Media LLC, through licensee Alpha Media Licensee LLC. It airs a contemporary hit radio format.

== History ==
The station first launched on January 26, 1988, with the call sign WYND-FM. It aired a smooth jazz/new age music format and was owned by Richard J. Hayes and Associates. On April 10, 1989, WYND-FM changed to WPLC, simulcasting the urban contemporary format of then-WPLZ in Petersburg, also on 99.3. It became WYSK on September 30, 1994.

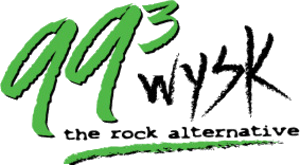
Logo used for WYSK-FM from March 4, 2002 to January 7, 2008.

In 1994, the station was purchased by The Free Lance–Star, a daily newspaper in Fredericksburg. On July 16, 1996, WYSK modified its call letters to WYSK-FM, switching to an adult contemporary format. On March 4, 2002, WYSK-FM flipped to alternative rock, branded as "99.3 WYSK – The Rock Alternative".

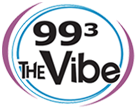
Logo used until 2018

At noon on January 7, 2008, WYSK-FM dropped its alternative format and switched to rhythmic contemporary with the station's first song being Justin Timberlake's "SexyBack". The call letters were changed from WYSK to WWVB-FM on January 11, 2008, to go along with the new moniker "The Vibe". On August 13, 2009, the call sign was changed from WWVB-FM to WVBX.

On January 23, 2015, Alpha Media "entered into a definitive agreement" to purchase WVBX and sister stations WFLS-FM, WNTX, and WWUZ from Free Lance-Star License, LLC. The purchase was consummated on May 1, 2015, at a price of $8.1 million.

On June 1, 2018, WVBX rebranded as "Live 99-3". The station moved to a more traditional contemporary hit radio playlist, moving away from the rhythmic format.

Alpha Media was acquired by Connoisseur Media in September 2025.
