= WNNL =

- Fuquay-Varina, North Carolina; United States
- Broadcast area: Raleigh–Durham; Research Triangle
- Frequency: 103.9 MHz (HD Radio)
- Branding: The Light 103.9

Programming
- Format: Urban gospel
- Subchannels: HD2: Simulcast of WDRU

Ownership
- Owner: Urban One; (Radio One Licenses, LLC)
- Sister stations: WFXC, WFXK, WQOK

History
- First air date: 1981; 45 years ago
- Former call signs: WAKS-FM (1978–1987); WAZZ (1987–1989); WNND (1989–1996); WTCD (1996); WZZU-FM (1996–1998)

Technical information
- Licensing authority: FCC
- Facility ID: 9728
- Class: C3
- ERP: 7,900 watts
- HAAT: 176 meters (577 ft)
- Transmitter coordinates: 35°35′47.5″N 78°45′17″W
- Translator: HD2: 105.7 W289BD (Raleigh)
- Repeater: 107.1 WFXC HD2 (Durham) 104.3 WFXK HD2 (Bunn)

Links
- Public license information: Public file; LMS
- Webcast: Listen live
- Website: www.thelightnc.com

WNNL (103.9 FM) is an urban gospel formatted station serving the Raleigh–Durham metropolitan region. Owned by Radio One with WQOK and WFXC/WFXK, the station is home to the Yolanda Adams morning show. Its studios are located in Raleigh and its transmitter site is in Fuquay-Varina, the station's city of license.

WNNL broadcasts two channels in the HD Radio format.

== History ==
WAKS-FM was a country station in Fuquay-Varina, North Carolina, and sister station to WAKS (1460 AM) when it signed on in 1981. In 1987 the station became easy listening WAZZ. In 1989 the station moved to Cary, North Carolina, and began playing smooth jazz as WNND "The Wind".

After financial problems, WNND was sold to Clear Channel and switched to a classic hits format, with the call letters WZZU, previously used by what is now WNCB. The current format began in October 1997 on WZZU and WDUR.

Clear Channel owned WNNL, WFXC, WFXK and WQOK until 2000 when the stations were spun off to Radio One for Clear Channel to meet ownership caps following their acquisition of AMFM.

== Translator ==
Call sign	Frequency	City of license	FID	ERP (W)	HAAT	Class	Transmitter coordinates	FCC info	Notes
W289BD	105.7 FM	Raleigh, North Carolina	152721	250	120.1 m (394 ft)	D	35°47′21.5″N 78°40′44″W	LMS	Relays HD2
