= WFXC =

Radio station in Durham, North Carolina, U.S.

- Durham, North Carolina; United States
- Broadcast area: Raleigh–Durham; Research Triangle
- Frequency: 107.1 MHz (HD Radio)
- Branding: "Foxy 107/104"

Programming
- Format: Urban adult contemporary
- Subchannels: HD2: WNNL Simulcast (For WFXC And WFXK)
- Affiliations: Rickey Smiley Morning Show

Ownership
- Owner: Urban One; (Radio One Licenses, LLC)
- Sister stations: WNNL, WQOK

History
- First air date: 1965; 61 years ago
- Former call signs: WSRC-FM (1965–1971); WDBS (1971–1984)
- Call sign meaning: "Foxy"

Technical information
- Licensing authority: FCC
- Facility ID: 36952
- Class: C3
- ERP: 13,000 watts
- HAAT: 146 meters (479 ft)
- Transmitter coordinates: 35°58′39.5″N 78°48′57″W

Links
- Public license information: Public file; LMS
- Webcast: Listen live
- Website: www.foxync.com

Simulcast
- WFXK
- Bunn, North Carolina; United States
- Frequency: 104.3 MHz (HD Radio)

Ownership
- Owner: Urban One; (Radio One Licenses, LLC)

History
- First air date: 1952; 74 years ago
- Former call signs: WCPS-FM (1952–1976); WKTC (1976–1989); WAZO (1989–1990); WCAS (1990–1992)

Technical information
- Facility ID: 24931
- Class: C1
- ERP: 100,000 watts
- HAAT: 299 meters (981 ft)
- Transmitter coordinates: 36°2′20.5″N 78°3′44″W

Links
- Public license information: Public file; LMS

WFXC (107.1 FM) and WFXK (104.3 FM) are a pair of simulcasting urban adult contemporary stations in the Raleigh-Durham, North Carolina market. WFXC is the main station, licensed to Durham, while WFXK is a full-power satellite licensed to Bunn.

Owned by Radio One along with K97.5 and The Light 103.9, "Foxy 107/104" plays "Today's R&B and Classic Soul" and airs the Rickey Smiley morning show and the D.L. Hughley afternoon show. The station was ranked first in the Roanoke Rapids market in the Fall of 2006, Spring 2007 and Fall of 2007. Its studios are located in Raleigh; the WFXC transmitter tower is in Oak Grove, just east of Durham, while the WFXK transmitter is near Castalia, west of Rocky Mount.

WFXC and WFXK broadcast in the HD Radio format.

== History ==
Logo under previous slogan

=== 107.1 ===
WFXC signed on in 1965 as WSRC-FM, the sister station of Durham's WSRC (1410 AM, now WRJD). In 1971, Duke University Broadcasting Service bought the station and renamed it WDBS. The new station was free-form with much progressive rock, folk, jazz and a daily classical music program. On the business side, WDBS operated as a non-profit commercial station. With WDBS's commercial dial position increasing in value, Duke sold the station to the Village Companies in 1983 and applied for a non-commercial license. Classic Ventures, Ltd. later bought WDBS, changing the format to easy listening. The call letters changed to WFXC in June 1984 with a format targeted at the black community. In 1986, WFXC became known as "Foxy 107-The Triangle's Strong Song Station", the first area FM to program urban contemporary music. In 1987, WQOK moved in from South Boston and went head-to-head with "Foxy" for the urban audience. Though WFXC had recently moved from Rose of Sharon Road in western Durham County to a more centrally located taller tower off NC 98, it was hampered by its 3,000-watt signal—a consequence of being short-spaced to stations in Southern Pines and Clinton also at 107.1. As a result, "Foxy" was no match for the powerful 100,000-watt newcomer. In hopes of gaining more ratings traction, the station switched to a rhythm and blues/urban adult contemporary format targeting an older, upscale audience in 1990.

In the spring of 1992, WFXC found a fix for its coverage shortfall in WCAS (104.3 FM), a faltering 100,000-watt move-in from Tarboro programming adult contemporary. WCAS had the opposite problem as WFXC; its signal in the western Triangle left much to be desired. Owner Pinnacle Broadcasting quickly entered into a local marketing agreement with WCAS owner Osborn Communications and began airing at two dial positions as "Foxy 107/104". The two stations provided a strong combined signal, with at least secondary coverage from the fringes of the Triad to Greenville.

WCAS later became WFXK and both stations are now owned by Radio One.

WFXC plans a power increase with a change to class C3. On October 4, 2017, WFXK released a Construction permit to up their transmitter power from 8,000 watts to 13,000 watts. But the Antenna array will be lowered from 479 feet HAAT To 463 feet HAAT. The construction permit expires October 4, 2020. The station shares its eastern Durham County tower with sister-station WQOK.

=== 104.3 ===
WFXK began as WCPS-FM in Tarboro, North Carolina, the sister station of WCPS (760 AM). Both stations later became the property of Curtis Media Group and the frequency became home to a country music format as WKTC "Katie Country". In 1990, 104.3 FM was upgraded to serve the Raleigh market by new owner Osborne Communications, while the WKTC intellectual property moved to 96.9 FM in Goldsboro. Osborne debuted in Raleigh as WAZO, but later became WCAS "Class 104", an adult contemporary station. it provided a strong signal from Raleigh to Greenville and the fringes of the Fayetteville area. The "Class" format attracted some notable personalities from other area stations such as WRAL morning man "Famous" Bob Inskeep, but never really took off ratings wise. With WCAS' transmitter located as close as it could legally get to the core of the Triangle while still providing city-grade coverage of Tarboro, it had a weak signal in the western portion of the market (Durham, Chapel Hill). In 1992, Class 104 gave way to a simulcast of WFXC called "Foxy 107/Foxy 104", changing its calls to WFXK.

WFXC and WFXK were purchased by Clear Channel Communications in 1996 and were owned by Clear Channel Worldwide until 2000 when the two, along with WNNL and WQOK, were spun off to Radio One for Clear Channel to meet ownership caps following their acquisition of AMFM.

In 2012, WFXK was relicensed from Tarboro to Bunn, but kept the same transmitter in Castalia.
