= Arrow (radio format) =

American brand name radio format

Arrow is an American brand name radio format that plays classic rock from the 1970s through the 1990s. The format was popular in a number of markets in the 1990s and 2000s. The word "Arrow" is an extended acronym for "All Rock and Roll Oldies".

== History ==
Originally, the Arrow format focused on rock-oriented oldies music from the mid-1960s through the mid-1980s, excluding pop, bubblegum, disco, and doo-wop. It also kept disc jockey talk and jingles to a minimum.

Many Arrow stations were owned by Infinity Broadcasting and located throughout the United States. The flagship and founding station for Arrow was KCBS-FM in Los Angeles which created and launched the format in September 1993. In 1996, the station adjusted to a broad-based classic rock format that lasted until its flip to adult hits as "Jack FM" in 2005. Outside Los Angeles, the Arrow format has been used on KRRW in Dallas–Fort Worth, KKRW in Houston, WARW in Washington, D.C., and KRSP-FM in Salt Lake City.

== Netherlands ==
In the Netherlands, Arrow Classic Rock airs a classic rock format similar (but independently) to that in the United States. Launched in 1996, Arrow originally broadcast on various AM and later FM frequencies, moving exclusively to cable radio in 2009. Since 2004, the company that operates Arrow has also run a jazz station known as "Arrow Jazz FM" (now SubLime FM). In The Netherlands the name 'Arrow' developed further into a brandname for quality music with a number of 'vertical' non-presented music formats like Arrow Rock Radio (mix of Classic Rock, Modern Rock and Alternative), Arrow CAZ (Todays Hits), Arrow Bluesbox (Blues, Bluesrock, Americana and Country), Arrow High Voltage (Metal and Hard Rock). During 2017 als Arrow TV started as a 'proof of concept' with three channels Rock, Bluesrock and Metal.
