= WFLS-FM =

Radio station in Fredericksburg, Virginia

- Fredericksburg, Virginia; United States
- Broadcast area: Northern Virginia; Central Virginia; Southern Maryland
- Frequency: 93.3 MHz (HD Radio)
- Branding: 93.3 WFLS

Programming
- Language: English
- Format: Country music
- Affiliations: Skyview Networks

Ownership
- Owner: Connoisseur Media; (Alpha Media Licensee, LLC)
- Sister stations: WNTX; WVBX; WWUZ

History
- First air date: June 12, 1962
- Call sign meaning: Free Lance–Star (former owner)

Technical information
- Licensing authority: FCC
- Facility ID: 65641
- Class: B
- ERP: 50,000 watts
- HAAT: 150 meters (490 ft)
- Transmitter coordinates: 38°18′46.4″N 77°26′18.9″W

Links
- Public license information: Public file; LMS
- Webcast: Listen live; Listen live (via Audacy); Listen live (via iHeartRadio)
- Website: www.wfls.com

WFLS-FM (93.3 FM "93.3 WFLS") is a country music formatted broadcast radio station licensed to Fredericksburg, Virginia, serving Northern Virginia, Central Virginia, and Southern Maryland. WFLS-FM is owned and operated by Connoisseur Media.

== History ==
WFLS was founded, and initially owned and operated by, The Free Lance–Star newspaper. WFLS began broadcasting as an AM station (on 1350 AM), on July 15, 1960.

Adopting a middle-of-the-road format, WFLS-FM launched on June 12, 1962. The station switched to an all-country music format in 1975. It started broadcasting in HD Radio in May 2006. It started with the slogan "Virginia's Best Country", used until early 2006. Then "Real Country Variety" used from early 2006 to April 2, 2012, and has been using "Today's Country" since then.

On April 16, 2013, W243BS (96.5 FM) dropped its simulcast of sister station WNTX for a simulcast of WFLS-FM HD2 carrying a freeform format. The "FredFM" format was dropped in early March 2014, when W243BS resumed simulcasting sister station WNTX. As of May 2024, the HD2 feed is from sister station WWUZ 96.9 (classic rock) in Bowling Green, Virginia.

On January 23, 2015, Alpha Media "entered into a definitive agreement" to purchase WFLS and sister stations WNTX, WVBX, and WWUZ from Free Lance-Star License, Inc. The purchase was consummated on May 1, at a price of $8.1 million. Alpha Media merged with Connoisseur Media on September 4, 2025.
