= KFZN =

Radio station in Gainesville, Texas

Coordinates: 33.536°N 96.832°W

- Gainesville, Texas; United States
- Broadcast area: Dallas–Fort Worth metroplex Sherman; Denison; Gainesville; Ardmore; Durant
- Frequency: 94.5 MHz (HD Radio)
- Branding: Fuzión 94.5

Programming
- Language: Spanish
- Format: Christian radio
- Subchannels: HD2: KGLY simulcast HD3: KZWL simulcast

Ownership
- Owner: Encouragement Media Group; (Fuzión Dallas, LLC)

History
- First air date: 1958
- Former call signs: KGAF-FM (1958–1981); KDNT-FM (1981–1987); KZRK (1987–1989); KDGE (1989–2000); KTXQ-FM (2000–2002); KSOC (2002–2017); KZMJ (2017–2026)
- Call sign meaning: Fuzión

Technical information
- Licensing authority: FCC
- Facility ID: 6386
- Class: C
- ERP: 100,000 watts
- HAAT: 591 meters (1,939 ft)

Links
- Public license information: Public file; LMS

KFZN (94.5 FM) is a radio station licensed to Gainesville and serves the Dallas–Fort Worth metroplex in Texas. The station is owned and operated by Encouragement Media Group and broadcasts a Spanish Christian format. The KFZN studios are located in the Dallas International District and its transmitter is located in Collinsville. KFZN broadcasts in HD and is an affiliate of the Fuzión radio network.

== History ==
94.5 FM signed on in 1958 as KGAF-FM, the sister station to KGAF/1580. The station was owned by the Leonard Brothers, and the transmitter was east of Gainesville. KGAF would last until the 1980s, when the 94.5 frequency would be sold off.

=== KDNT-FM ===
94.5 was then sold to Mel Wheeler, who owned 106.1 (now KHKS). KDNT-FM broadcast a country format, which was previously on 106.1. The country format would be moved to the newly acquired 94.5 frequency. 94.5 would never claim good ratings in the Dallas–Fort Worth market due to the location of the tower east of Gainesville which would have a rimshot signal into the Metroplex.

=== KZRK ===
On July 3, 1987, with KSCS and KPLX competing for the country audience with city-grade signals, KDNT-FM and its country format were dropped and became KZRK "Z-Rock 94-5". Wheeler, owner of KDNT, had died, and the station was sold once again.

=== KDGE ===
On June 30, 1989, after Ed Wodka bought the station, KZRK changed call letters to KDGE, adjusted the format to alternative rock, and rebranded the station as "94.5 The Edge". The first song on "The Edge" was "Do You Remember Rock 'n' Roll Radio?" by The Ramones. Bonneville International bought the station in late 1994, while Evergreen Media would purchase it in 1996; Evergreen would merge with Chancellor Media in 1998. Chancellor would look to improve 94.5's ERP at 78,000 watts. Part of the station's signal woes were solved when KDGE relocated its transmitter to its current location and increased the power to 98,000 watts."KDGE 94.5 Gainesville Dallas 25 November 1997".

=== KTXQ-FM ===
In October 2000, Clear Channel Communications would purchase AMFM (KDGE's owners at the time), which put them over ownership limits at that time. To resolve this, 94.5 FM and the intellectual property of rhythmic oldies-formatted sister station KTXQ, "Magic 102", were sold to Radio One. On November 9, 2000, at 6 a.m., KTXQ swapped formats and frequencies with KDGE, and the station's name was changed to "Magic 94.5". The last song on "94.5 The Edge" was "How Soon Is Now?" by The Smiths, while the first song on "Magic 94.5" was "I Would Die 4 U" by Prince.

=== K-Soul ===
94.5 K-Soul logo used from 2002-2011

On April 22, 2002, after stunting for a few days using the branding "Joyner 94.5", KTXQ-FM shifted to urban AC as KSOC "94.5 K-Soul", playing current R&B and classic soul. It was home to two syndicated shows: The Tom Joyner Morning Show (which previously aired on KKDA-FM/K104 and then-urban AC rival KRNB) and Love, Lust and Lies with Michael Baisden in the afternoons.

=== Old School 94.5 ===
On July 18, 2011, KSOC dropped the "K-Soul" branding after nine years. However, the format continued to run, although without disc jockeys with Michael Baisden dropped from the station's schedule. The staff of KSOC had indicated that changes were coming to the station, and they have accepted feedback from their listeners. At 5 p.m. on July 29, 2011, KSOC rebranded as Old School 94.5, although the station's format remained urban adult contemporary per Mediabase and Nielsen BDS. The last song on "K-Soul" was A Change Is Gonna Come by Sam Cooke, followed by the first song of the new format being Ain't No Stoppin' Us Now by McFadden & Whitehead. The launch was helped by former radio personalities Skip Murphy & Company (previously on KKDA-FM).

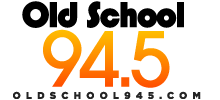
Old School 94.5 logo

KSOC's playlist had a diverse mix of classic R&B and soul music from the 1960s to early 1990s, similar to its "Magic 102/94.5" predecessors, with less modern music. As of October 2011, Tom Joyner had returned to the morning drive, Janet G handled the 9 a.m. to 2 p.m. shift, and Kenny J handled the 2 p.m. to 7 p.m. slot.

=== Return to K-Soul ===
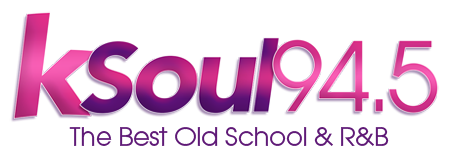
Previous K-Soul logo

On January 22, 2014, at 9 a.m., after The Tom Joyner Morning Show, KSOC returned to the "K-Soul" branding, this time as K-Soul 94.5, launching with 94 hours of commercial-free music. While keeping a gold based presentation, KSOC updated its library to bring back tracks from the 1990s and 2000s. As of late March 2014, KSOC simulcasted on sister station KBFB's secondary HD broadcast on 97.9-HD2 for those in the immediate DFW area and southern neighbors who are not in the station's pre-determined coverage area.

=== Boom 94.5 ===
On November 14, 2014, at 6 p.m., KSOC changed their format to classic hip hop, branded as "Boom 94.5". As before, they provided 94 hours of commercial-free music. With the then-recent format change, the syndicated The Tom Joyner Morning Show, for which K-Soul was the home affiliate, was dropped, a change Joyner noted the following Monday morning on his show, where he told DFW listeners to download the free app for the iPhone or Android or listen on a different affiliate. A month after the format switch, ratings jumped from a 2.8 share to a 3.4 according to Nielsen and Mediabase (who oddly enough kept KSOC in the urban AC panel), cracking the Top 10 station list above its urban counterpart KBFB. However, this success would be short lived, as ratings for the station returned to the mid-1 shares in the market.

On October 10, 2016, KSOC tweaked their format by adding some R&B songs from the 1990s and early 2000s, and modified their slogan to "Classic Hip-Hop and Throwback R&B". Despite the format adjustment, ratings did not improve.

=== Majic 94.5 ===
Previous Majic 94.5 logo

On September 11, 2017, at 6 a.m., KSOC flipped back to urban AC for the second time, now branded as "Majic 94.5". With the change, The Tom Joyner Morning Show returned to the market for the first time in nearly three years. On September 18, 2017, KSOC changed their call letters to KZMJ to match the new branding. KZMJ was the flagship station for the nationally syndicated quiet storm evening slow-jams program Love and R&B, hosted by singer/actor Al B. Sure!. Among other specialty programing was DJ Mo Dave's weekly mix show on Friday nights consisted of classic hip-hop tracks previously heard on the station when it was known as "Boom 94.5".

=== Spanish Christian ===
On May 1, 2026, it was announced that KZMJ would be sold to Encouragement Media Group. The new owners announced the station would switch to their "Fuzión" network, which runs a Spanish Christian format. Concurrently, Radio One announced the acquisition of KRNB and KKDA-FM from Service Broadcasting. In preparation of the impending transactions, Urban One moved The Rickey Smiley Morning Show back to KBFB. Station personnel wrote on their social media pages, saying, "This is not goodbye, it’s see ya later!", hinting at a possibility of the return of 'Majic' in the market elsewhere on the dial or online (most of the 'Majic' staff eventually returned on Urban One's newly acquired KRNB by July 21). On July 7 at 12:00 a.m., the last song under the "Majic" branding was "Whatta Man" by Salt-N-Pepa, then midway into the song, the station abruptly switched to the "Fuzión" network, in which Encouragement Media Group took over operations of KZMJ, and effectively discontinued the Urban AC format. The station also changed its call letters to KFZN to match the "Fuzión" branding.

== Signal ==
Unlike most of the area's FM stations, which transmit their signals from Cedar Hill, KFZN transmits its signal from an area east of Collinsville. Therefore, KFZN's signal is much stronger in the Northern parts of the Dallas/Fort Worth metroplex including Dallas, Denton, and McKinney as well as the cities of Decatur, Gainesville, Sherman, and Bonham, to as far North as Ardmore and Durant, Oklahoma, but is considerably weaker in Fort Worth and areas south of Dallas.
