= WWUZ =

Radio station in Bowling Green, Virginia

- Bowling Green, Virginia; United States
- Broadcast area: Metro Fredericksburg
- Frequency: 96.9 MHz
- Branding: 96.9 The Cannon

Programming
- Format: Mainstream rock (Active Rock leaning)

Ownership
- Owner: Connoisseur Media; (Alpha Media Licensee LLC)
- Sister stations: WFLS-FM; WNTX; WVBX

History
- First air date: October 1998
- Former call signs: WLMN (1991–1998)

Technical information
- Licensing authority: FCC
- Facility ID: 55174
- Class: A
- ERP: 2,950 watts
- HAAT: 144 meters (472 ft)
- Transmitter coordinates: 37°57′56.5″N 77°22′17.9″W

Links
- Public license information: Public file; LMS
- Webcast: Listen live
- Website: www.969thecannon.com

WWUZ (96.9 FM) is a broadcast radio station licensed to Bowling Green, Virginia, serving Metro Fredericksburg. WWUZ is owned and operated by Connoisseur Media, through licensee Alpha Media Licensee LLC.

== History ==
The station first took the callsign WLMN on August 23, 1991, and changed it to WWUZ on August 10, 1998.

WWUZ officially launched in October 1998 with a classic rock format. In April 2000, the station switched to classic hits, branded as "96.9 the Rock". In February 2002, WWUZ changed back to its classic rock format, branded as "Classic Rock 96.9". On March 15, 2012, WWUZ changed its branding to "96.9 the Rock", but kept the classic rock format.

WWUZ was mentioned in the 15th episode of the 6th season of The Sopranos.

On January 23, 2015, Alpha Media "entered into a definitive agreement" to purchase WWUZ and sister stations WFLS-FM, WNTX, WVBX from Free Lance-Star License, Inc. The purchase was consummated on May 1, 2015, at a price of $8.1 million. Alpha Media merged with Connoisseur Media on September 4, 2025.

On October 17, 2026, WWUZ began stunting with songs related to war, weapons or artillery in some form (such as "For Those About to Rock" by AC/DC, "Bang Bang" by Nancy Sinatra, and "45" by Shinedown), with cryptic sweepers hinting at "something loud coming" the following Monday, the 19th, at 6am, and the station's website replaced entirely with a link to the webstream and a countdown clock to that time advising similar cryptic sound warnings and offering an interactive cannon to "fire" (with a tally counter underneath marking the times it was "fired" altogether). The station is expected to shift to a active rock-directed focus after as "96.9 The Cannon", as Connoisseur had already prepared social media, most notably registering the 969thecannon.com web domain on GoDaddy for the brand as the stunt occurred.

On October 19, 2026 at 6 am, WWUZ ended stunting and launched an active rock leaning- mainstream rock format, branded as "96.9 The Cannon".
