= WQOK =

- Carrboro, North Carolina; United States
- Broadcast area: Raleigh–Durham; Research Triangle
- Frequency: 97.5 MHz (HD Radio)
- Branding: "K97.5"

Programming
- Format: Urban Contemporary

Ownership
- Owner: Urban One; (Radio One Licenses, LLC)
- Sister stations: WFXC, WFXK, WNNL

History
- First air date: October 1, 1960; 65 years ago
- Former call signs: WHLF-FM (1960–1973); WJLC-FM (1973–1987)

Technical information
- Licensing authority: FCC
- Facility ID: 69559
- Class: C2
- ERP: 50,000 watts
- HAAT: 146 meters (479 ft)
- Transmitter coordinates: 35°58′39.5″N 78°48′57″W

Links
- Public license information: Public file; LMS
- Webcast: Listen Live
- Website: hiphopnc.com

WQOK (97.5 FM) is a commercial radio station licensed to Carrboro, North Carolina, and serving the Raleigh–Durham radio market. WQOK is owned and operated by Urban One and airs a hip hop-leaning urban contemporary radio format. Its studios and offices are located on Creedmoor Road in Raleigh. Its transmitter tower is in Oak Grove, just east of Durham.

Each weekday, WQOK carries The Morning Hustle featuring Kyle Santillian and Lore’l, syndicated from Atlanta. Local DJs are heard the rest of the day. WQOK broadcasts in the HD radio format.

== History ==
=== WHLF-FM and WJLC ===
WQOK is considered a "move in" station, having begun its history in Virginia, about 40 miles (64 km) north of Raleigh, before it moved into the Research Triangle of North Carolina. On October 1, 1960, the station signed on as WHLF-FM in South Boston, Virginia. It was the FM counterpart to WHLF (1400 AM; now WAJL), with the two stations simulcasting their programming. WHLF-FM effective radiated power was 2,400 watts, limiting its coverage to just South Boston and adjacent communities.

In the 1970s, it changed its call sign to WJLC-FM, airing an automated Top 40 format separate from the co-owned AM station. The power was increased to 29,000 watts but only using a 250-foot (76 m) tower, so it still did not cover the Raleigh-Durham market. In the 1980s, it switched to a soft adult contemporary/MOR format, but the power and antenna height remained the same.

=== Moving to Raleigh ===
In 1987, radio entrepreneur and syndicated morning radio host Tom Joyner purchased the station, under the corporate name "Power Broadcasting". The format was switched to urban contemporary, using the call letters WQOK, and rebranded as "K-Power 97.5". Joyner moved the transmitter tower closer to Raleigh, boosting it to 1,020 feet (310 m) in height above average terrain (HAAT). He also upgraded WQOK's effective radiated power to 100,000 watts, the maximum power permitted by the Federal Communications Commission (FCC), although the city of license remained as South Boston.

The new tower and coverage area gave WQOK a "city grade" signal over South Boston as required by the FCC, and also put a strong signal around the Triangle as well. Closing down the original South Boston studios, the station signed on from brand new facilities in Raleigh. By winter 1991, WQOK claimed the number one spot in the Arbitron ratings.

=== Sales to Clear Channel and Urban One ===
In 1989, Joyner sold the station to Four Chiefs, Inc., owned by noted African-American broadcast executive Ragan Henry. Henry owned the station for seven years and sold it to Clear Channel Communications in May 1996.

In 2000, as a result of a merger between Clear Channel and another owner of radio stations, AMFM, the new larger company wanted to spin off some of its stations. WQOK was sold to Radio One (now called Urban One), along with current sister stations 107.1 WFXC, 104.3 WFXK, and 103.9 WNNL. The sale meant that once again, the station is under African-American ownership.

WQOK had carried the syndicated Russ Parr Morning Show. In January 2016, Parr was replaced by The Rickey Smiley Morning Show, which is syndicated by parent company Urban One. Smiley's show was moved to WFXC and WFXK, and was replaced on K97.5 by The Morning Hustle with hosts Kyle Santillian and Lore’l, also syndicated by Urban One.

=== Changing the city of license and tower ===
Former logo

In 2007, WQOK asked the FCC to move its city of license to Carrboro. It would put the transmitter on a tower in Durham, closer to the Research Triangle's population center. That would also mean a decrease from Class C1 to C2.

This dropped the power from 100,000 watts to 50,000 watts and all but eliminated coverage of Virginia. It reduced a short-spacing issue with WWWV in Charlottesville, Virginia, which also broadcasts on 97.5 MHz. The station's new tower is shared with WFXC.
