= WPZZ =

Radio station in Crewe, Virginia

- Crewe, Virginia; United States
- Broadcast area: Southside Virginia; Richmond, Virginia; Petersburg, Virginia
- Frequency: 104.7 MHz
- Branding: Praise 104.7

Programming
- Format: Urban gospel

Ownership
- Owner: Urban One; (Radio One Licenses, LLC)
- Sister stations: WCDX; WKJM; WKJS; WDCJ; WXGI

History
- First air date: 1949
- Former call signs: WSVS-FM (1949–1991); WKIK (1991–1995); WBZU (1995–1996); WVGO (1996–1998); WKJS (1998–2004)
- Call sign meaning: "Praise"

Technical information
- Facility ID: 321
- Class: C1
- ERP: 100,000 watts
- HAAT: 299 meters (981 ft)
- Transmitter coordinates: 37°10′15.5″N 77°57′15″W

Links
- Webcast: Listen live
- Website: www.praiserichmond.com

WPZZ (104.7 FM) is an urban gospel-formatted broadcast radio station licensed to Crewe, Virginia, serving the Southside and the Richmond/Petersburg metro area. WPZZ is owned and operated by Radio One. The station's studios and offices are located just north of Richmond proper on Emerywood Parkway in unincorporated Henrico County, and its transmitter is located near Blackstone, Virginia.

== History ==
The station started in 1949 as WSVS-FM, a complement to its AM sister WSVS. It broadcast just west of Crewe with 14,000 watts of power. In the late 1970s, the station upgraded to a class C1 station with 100,000 watts of power, which gave it an adequate signal that could be received in most of the Central Virginia area. In 1988, it moved to its current tower location to not only send a better signal into Richmond, but also to make it more desirable to sell. It was at that time WSVS-FM became "Power Country 104.7," with all programming separate from WSVS AM. In 1991, the station was sold to ABS Communications in Richmond and became "104.7 The Bear", with the WKIK call sign. The FM studios were moved out of Crewe and co-located in with ABS's Richmond based headquarters. ABS owned the only other country stations in the Richmond market with "K-95" and "The Bear". "The Bear" was designed to be a classic country format, while "K-95" was to be the new country format.

At 5 p.m. on August 23, 1995, ABS flipped WKIK to modern rock as WBZU, "104.7 The Buzz, Richmond's New Rock Alternative." The success of this station caused Richmond's AAA station WVGO to lose listeners. ABS later purchased WVGO (and its sister station WLEE-FM), changed WVGO's AAA format (and ended the local broadcast of The Howard Stern Show) and moved "The Buzz" and the WBZU calls to 106.5, while 104.7 became a satellite-fed oldies station as "Oldies 104.7" (the WVGO calls were moved to 104.7) in August 1996.

In February 1998, the station was sold to Fifteen Forty Broadcasting, then owners of adult urban WSOJ (100.3 FM) and local gospel station WREJ (1540 AM), who began a simulcast of WSOJ on both 100.3 and 104.7 beginning February 10, and rebranded as "104.7 Kiss FM", and adopted the WKJS calls three days later. Radio One later purchased both 104.7 and 100.3 from Fifteen Forty in March 1999. In November 2000, the 104.7/100.3 simulcast ended, and Radio One began simulcasting their then-country station, WJRV ("105.7 The River") on 100.3 with new calls WARV. On November 18, 2004, as part of a complex series of moves, Radio One moved the urban gospel-formatted "Praise 99.3" to 104.7, while "Kiss FM" moved to 99.3 and 105.7 (this caused urban oldies WJMO to sign off). The WPZZ calls would be adopted on December 7 of that year.
