= WDCJ =

Radio station in Petersburg, Virginia

Simulcasts WXGI, Richmond
- Petersburg, Virginia; United States
- Broadcast area: Metro Petersburg
- Frequency: 1240 kHz
- Branding: 99.5 and 102.7 The Box

Programming
- Format: Classic hip hop

Ownership
- Owner: Urban One; (Radio One Licenses, LLC)
- Sister stations: WCDX; WKJM; WKJS; WPZZ; WXGI

History
- First air date: 1945 (as WSSV)
- Former call signs: WSSV (1945–1986); WPLZ (1986–1989); WGCV (1989–2003); WROU (2003–2007); WTPS (2007–2025)

Technical information
- Licensing authority: FCC
- Facility ID: 60474
- Class: C
- Power: 1,000 watts unlimited
- Transmitter coordinates: 37°14′1.5″N 77°22′34.9″W
- Translator: 102.7 W274BX (Petersburg)

Links
- Public license information: Public file; LMS
- Webcast: Listen live
- Website: theboxrichmond.com

WDCJ (1240 kHz) is a classic hip hop-formatted broadcast radio station licensed to Petersburg, Virginia, United States, serving Metro Petersburg. WDCJ is owned and operated by Urban One. The station's studios and offices are located just north of Richmond proper on Emerywood Parkway in unincorporated Henrico County

== History ==
The station first signed on the air in 1945 as WSSV. It was founded as a local station for the Petersburg area and operated as a Top 40 outlet for much of its early life. In 1970, the station was purchased by Eure Communications, which also operated its FM sister station, WSSV-FM.

In 1986, the station was sold to Paco-John Broadcasting and changed its call letters to WPLZ, beginning a long association with urban and gospel formats. Three years later, in 1989, it became WGCV and shifted to a gospel format. In 1992, WGCV and WPLZ-FM was sold to Sinclair Telecable.

After a brief period as WROU in the mid-2000s under the ownership of Radio One (now Urban One), the station adopted the WTPS call letters to match its "The People's Station" branding.

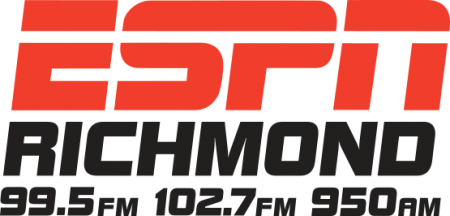
Logo as a sports station

The station has broadcast the programming of WXGI in Richmond since Urban One's purchase of that station on May 1, 2017, in order to give WXGI—at that time a sports station—a metro Richmond FM signal. The stations eventually flipped to a classic hip-hop format known as " 99.5 and 102.7 The Box".

On December 11, 2025, the station's call sign was changed to WDCJ as a side effect of a format flip involving the former WDCJ in the Washington, D.C. market.

== Translator ==
On July 9, 2016, WDCJ began relaying its signal on an FM translator to widen its broadcast area. The translator is fed by WCDX-HD2.

Call sign	Frequency	City of license	FID	ERP (W)	HAAT	Class	FCC info
W274BX	102.7 FM	Petersburg, Virginia	154012	180	86 m (282 ft)	D	LMS
