= WCRY =

Radio station in Fuquay-Varina, North Carolina

- Fuquay-Varina, North Carolina; United States
- Broadcast area: Research Triangle
- Frequency: 1460 kHz
- Branding: "Joy 1460"

Programming
- Format: Defunct

Ownership
- Owner: Willis Broadcasting; (Durham Christian Radio, Inc.)

History
- First air date: 1949; 77 years ago
- Last air date: June 2004; 21 years ago
- Former call signs: WFVG (1949–1967); WAKS (1967–1989); WNBR (1989–1992)

Technical information
- Facility ID: 52645
- Class: D
- Power: 5,000 watts daytime 122 watts nighttime
- Transmitter coordinates: 35°36′37.6″N 78°48′13″W

WCRY (1460 AM, "Joy 1460") was a radio station broadcasting a black gospel music format. Licensed to serve Fuquay-Varina, North Carolina, United States, it broadcast to the Research Triangle metropolitan area. It first began broadcasting in 1949 under the call sign WFVG, and ceased operations in 2004. The station was owned by Willis Broadcasting.

== History ==
The station went on the air in 1949 as WFVG, a 1,000-watt daytimer in Fuquay Springs owned by Wake Broadcasting Company; the call letters stood for "Watch Fuquay-Varina Grow". In 1950, S. S. Adcock sold a 60-percent interest in the station to J. M. Stephenson and W. J. Davis for $34,000; a few months later, Adcock sold his remaining interest to Stephenson and Davis for over $50,000. Davis sold his stake to B.H. Ingle Sr. for $16,000 in 1951; Ingle then sold his stake to Stephenson after applying for a station in Raleigh. WFVG became an affiliate of the Mutual Broadcasting System in 1957.

James M. Stephenson was part of a group that bought WKIX AM-FM in Raleigh in 1958; as a condition of this purchase, Stephenson sold WFVG to a group led by James F. Flanagan for $42,000. In 1960, Gail Lewis sold his 37.5-percent stake in the station to the remaining partners, Flanagan and Dr. Robert C. Currin, for $10,000; the sale coincided with Lewis' purchase of WEYE in Sanford. H. Cloid Wade Jr. and Carl W. Venters Jr., owners of WFAG in Farmville, bought WFVG in 1962. As WFVG, the station provided agricultural information, along with country music and rock and roll.

In 1967, WFVG was sold to Gray Broadcasting Corp.; on October 18, it changed its call letters to WAKS. As WAKS, the station programmed a full-time country music format. Gray Broadcasting sold WAKS to Joseph B. Wilder, James M. Butts, and L. Keith Whittle for $125,000 in 1971. In 1978, the station increased its power to 5,000 watts and changed its city of license to Fuquay-Varina. (Note: Fuquay Springs and Varina had merged in 1963.) An FM sister station, WAKS-FM (103.9), was added on December 9, 1980; it simulcast 90 percent of WAKS' programming.

Wake County Broadcasting sold WAKS and WAKS-FM to Mohr-Engledow Broadcasting for $850,000 in 1986. After WAKS-FM changed to easy listening station WAZZ in 1987, the country format remained on WAKS. Meca Broadcasting sold WAKS and WAZZ to Ceder Communications for $1.43 million in 1989. On October 20, 1989, the call letters were changed to WNBR, as the station moved to a business news/talk format. The station was also granted 122 watts of nighttime power. In December 1991, WNBR dropped the business news format and went silent.

The station changed its call letters to WCRY on April 15, 1992. In February 1993, WCRY returned to the air with a news/talk format as the flagship station of the "North Carolina Talk Network", which also included WEEB in Southern Pines and WHPY in Clayton; later that year, WCRY was sold to Pinehurst Broadcasting Corporation. In August 1996, the station switched to a black gospel format and entered into a local marketing agreement with WSRC; WCRY was then sold to WSRC's owner, Durham Christian Radio, controlled by L. E. Willis, for $175,000 and became part of Willis Broadcasting Corporation.

The Federal Communications Commission (FCC) ordered Bishop Willis to surrender the licenses for four of his AM stations — KLRG in Little Rock, Arkansas, KVLA in Vidalia, Louisiana, WCRY, and WSVE in Jacksonville, Florida — on June 16, 2004, after accumulating $84,000 in fines due to violations of FCC rules dating to 1999. By June 21, 2004, WCRY had left the air; on June 24, WCRY's license was cancelled by the FCC.
