= Classic hip-hop =

Radio format

Classic hip-hop is a music radio format focusing primarily on hip-hop from the 1980s, 1990s, and the early to mid-2000s.

Although stations with such a format date back as far as 2004, the format was first popularized in October 2014, after Radio One dropped a poorly performing news radio format from its Houston station KROI in favor of classic hip-hop. After attracting a dramatic increase in ratings, Radio One began to emulate the station's format and branding in other markets. At the same time, other major radio broadcasters began to introduce classic hip-hop stations in selected markets.

== Format and targeting ==
Doug Abernethy, general manager of Radio One's Houston stations, described the classic hip-hop format as a parallel to the classic rock and classic country formats: these stations focus primarily on hip-hop from the 1980s, 1990s, and early 2000s, featuring artists such as 2Pac, De La Soul, Mike Jones, LL Cool J, Ludacris, The Notorious B.I.G., Queen Latifah, and Salt-N-Pepa. Some stations may include small amounts of R&B in their playlists as well.

Classic hip-hop stations are aimed primarily at listeners between the ages of 25 and 44; Tommy Boy Records founder Tom Silverman explained that hip-hop had "entered the realm of credible nostalgia", going on to say that "I'm sure there are kids now who think 3 Feet High and Rising by De La Soul is a rite of passage, just like Led Zeppelin is". The format also appeals to listeners who may not enjoy contemporary hip-hop: iHeartMedia senior vice president Doc Wynter explained that "hip-hop back then was about telling a story about your struggle and your family's struggle. Now the reigning hip-hop king is a multiracial guy from Toronto who did not struggle."

== History ==
=== Origins ===
The classic hip-hop format dates back to 2004, when KZAB, a Spanish-language FM station serving the Los Angeles area, was re-launched as KDAY. The re-launched station served to capitalize on the heritage of the original KDAY on the AM dial (now KBLA), which in the 1980s was the first radio station in the United States to play hip-hop music on a full-time basis. After the station's sale to Fred Sands in 1991, the station dropped hip-hop and switched to business news. The new KDAY originally focused primarily on classic hip-hop music: over the following years, it backtracked on its gold-based format, before reinstating it in 2009. The station's initial success was hampered primarily by its signal, which did not cover all of Greater Los Angeles (a rebroadcaster, KDEY-FM, was also established to improve the station's reach in the Inland Empire), along with the music itself, as hip-hop music from the 1990s was not yet nostalgic to listeners.

However, the new KDAY still enjoyed a cult following: after it was announced that KDAY would be acquired by the Meruelo Group, owners of Spanish-language television station KWHY-TV, it was speculated that the station would drop hip-hop and revert to a Spanish-language format to complement KWHY-TV. Following the establishment of a "Save KDAY" campaign on Facebook led by Dr. Dre (who was among the artists popularized by the original KDAY), the station's new owners confirmed that they would maintain the hip-hop format, citing the "value" of the KDAY brand, along with plans to broaden the station's audience to include Hispanic listeners.

=== Mainstream adoption ===
On October 13, 2014, after having dropped a low-rated all-news radio format five days prior in favor of all-Beyoncé music as a stunt, the Houston radio station KROI, owned by the urban-oriented radio group Radio One, launched a classic hip-hop format branded as "Boom 92". Radio One stated that the format was the first of its kind among major-market stations in the United States, and would serve to complement its other urban-oriented music stations in the market. Listenership of the new format saw a dramatic improvement over its previous all-news format: the following month, KROI improved its audience share of 0.9, 26th place among Houston stations, to 3.2, 14th place in the market.

In response to its success, Radio One began to flip further stations to the Boom format and brand, including Philadelphia's WPHI-FM and Dallas's KSOC. At the same time, other station groups, including iHeartMedia, Cumulus Media, Univision Radio, and Cox Media Group, began to slowly introduce classic hip-hop formats of their own. In November 2014, WTZA became the first station in the Atlanta market to adopt classic hip-hop; a few days later, both Cumulus Media's W250BC and Radio One's W275BK flipped as well, with the latter using the Boom branding. Some stations, over the 2014 holiday season, shifted towards classic hip-hop as a temporary format.

Edison Research analyst Sean Ross compared the growth of classic hip-hop to the emergence of classic rock, which came during a similar youth-oriented shift in mainstream rock towards glam metal bands and grunge.

KROI's success was short-lived; by December 2016, it had fallen back towards a 1.4 share. In January 2017, KROI would drop its classic hip-hop format in favor of contemporary hit radio.

== List of stations airing the format ==
Station name	Brand	Location	Ref
K242CE	"Throwback 96.3"	New Orleans, Louisiana	
KDAY/KDEY-FM	"93.5 KDAY"	Redondo Beach, California-Ontario, California	
KHYL	"V101"	Sacramento, California	
KJMP	"Jump 104.5"	Pierce, Colorado	
K276EX	"V103"	Oklahoma City, Oklahoma	
KNEV	"95.5 The Vibe"	Reno, Nevada	
KWCQ	"107.3 The Beat"	Kennewick, Washington	
KRBQ	"102 Jams"	San Francisco, California	
KSZR	"97.5 The Vibe"	Tucson, Arizona	
KUBT-HD2	"Jamz Hawaii"	Honolulu, Hawaii	
KVBH	"Vibe 107.5"	San Antonio, Texas	
KVGQ	"106.9 Da Bomb"	Las Vegas, Nevada	
KZFS	"Hooptown 101.5"	Spokane, Washington	
KZCE	"101.1 The Bounce"	Phoenix, Arizona	
WWWQ-HD3	"OG 97.9"	Atlanta, Georgia	
WCHZ-FM	""Hot 95.5/93.1"	Augusta, Georgia	
WFQY	"BDay 99.1"	Jackson, Mississippi	
WGBL	"G96.7"	Gulfport, Mississippi	
WHBT-FM	"92.1 The Beat"	Norfolk, Virginia	
WHJA	"Power 101.1"	Hattiesburg, Mississippi	
WJNI-HD2	"Old Skool 92.1"	Charleston, South Carolina	
WKCN-HD3	"Hip Hop 106.5"	Columbus, Georgia	
WKXD-HD2	"93.3 The Dawg"	Monterey, Tennessee	
WJMP	"Jump 103.7"	Plattsburgh, New York	
WLLY-HD3	"Yo! 107.1"	West Palm Beach, Florida	
WMGC-FM	"105.1 The Bounce"	Detroit, Michigan	
WMIB-HD3	"Throwback 105.5"	Miami, Florida	
W239BT/W240CP	"95.9 The Vibe"	Glasgow, Kentucky-Bowling Green, Kentucky	
WPOW-FM	"Power 96"	Miami, Florida	
WQKI-FM	"Jamz 95.7"	Orangeburg, South Carolina	
WQKS-HD2	"Yo! 100.5"	Montgomery, Alabama	
WSIM-HD2	"Jamz 107.5"	Florence, South Carolina	
WUKS	"107.7 The Bounce"	St. Pauls, North Carolina	
WXBK	"94.7 The Block"	New York, New York	
WXGI/ WDCJ/ WCDX-HD2	"99.5 & 102.7 The Box"	Richmond, Virginia-Petersburg, Virginia-Mechanicsville, Virginia	
WMMS-HD3	"Throwback 99.1"	Cleveland, Ohio	
WXKC-HD2	"104.3 The Vibe"	Erie, Pennsylvania	
WMQZ	"ICON 104.1"	Colchester, Illinois	
WZOE-FM	"ICON 98.1"	Princeton, Illinois	
WJHM	"102 JAMZ"	Daytona Beach-Greater Orlando-Central Florida	

=== Satellite radio stations ===
- LL Cool J's Rock the Bells Radio - SiriusXM

=== Networks ===
- Classic Hip-Hop - operated by Westwood One

== List of former stations airing the format ==
Station name	Brand	Location	Ended	New genre	Ref
CFXJ-FM	"Flow 93-5"	Toronto, Ontario	February 2016	Rhythmic AC, then rhythmic CHR	
K240EL	"Hot 95.9"	Austin, Texas	May 2024	Red dirt/Classic country	
K246BR	"Hot 97.1"	Honolulu, Hawaii	August 2016	All-80's hits	
K223AL	"Power 92.5"	Reno, Nevada	May 2018	Country music	
K256AS	"99.1 Jamz"	Honolulu, Hawaii	November 2019	Asian CHR	
K273BH	"Hot 102.5"	Minneapolis, Minnesota	February 2018	Urban	
K277CX	"G103.3"	San Antonio, Texas	June 2020	Rhythmic contemporary	
KENZ	"94.9 The Vibe"	Salt Lake City, Utah	January 2017	Top 40/CHR	
KFVR-FM	"94.7 & 93.9 The Beat"	Pueblo, Colorado	September 2017	Tejano music	
KJZN	"Rewind 105.5"	Fresno, California	January 2017	Soft AC	
KKRG-FM	"Yo! 105.1 FM"	Albuquerque, New Mexico	October 2017	Christmas music	
KLIF-FM	"Hot 93.3"	Dallas, Texas	2014	Urban contemporary, then top 40/CHR (Hot 93.3 aired for the 2014 holiday season)	
KMJM-FM	"100.3 The Beat"	St. Louis, Missouri	September 2016	Urban contemporary	
KMYO	"Yo! 95.1"	San Antonio, Texas	April 2017	Previous Spanish top 40/CHR format	
KRBQ	"Q102"	San Francisco, California	August 2019	Rhythmic oldies	
KROI	"Boom 92"	Houston, Texas	January 2017	Top 40/CHR	
KPPF	"Blazin 98.5"	Monument, Colorado			
KRUZ	"106.3 Spin FM"	Oxnard, California	June 2019	Top 40/CHR	
KWQW	"98.3 The Vibe"	Des Moines, Iowa	May 2021	Top 40/CHR	
KSOC	"Boom 94.5"	Dallas, Texas	September 2017	Urban AC	
W271BN	"Power 102.1"	Birmingham, Alabama			
W272BY	"102.3 The Beat"	Cincinnati, Ohio	March 2016	Mainstream urban	
W275BD	"Boom 102.9"	Indianapolis, Indiana	July 2018	Defunct; Regional Mexican	
W275BK	"Boom 102.9"	Atlanta, Georgia	December 2017	Urban oldies	
W282CA	"G 104.3"	Richmond, Virginia	May 2021	Country	
W288CX	"Throwback 105.5"	Columbia, South Carolina	February 2021	Black-oriented news	
WBMO	"Boom 106.3"	Columbus, Ohio	November 2017	Simulcast of sister station WCKX	
WCFB	"Star 94.5"	Daytona Beach, Florida	November 2014	Previous Urban AC format (Classic hip-hop aired for three weeks)	
WGHL	"G 105.1"	Louisville, Kentucky	August 2018	Modern rock	
WGVX	"105 The Vibe"	Minneapolis, Minnesota	November 2018	Christmas music, then soft AC	
WIVG	"Bumpin' 96" (formerly "Boomin' 96")	Memphis, Tennessee	February 2016	Alternative rock	
WJKS	"Kiss 104.3"	Keeseville, New York	June 2020	Country	
WJMP	"Jump 97.1"	Knoxville, Tennessee	December 2021	Urban contemporary	
WJXN-FM	"G100.9"	Jackson, Mississippi	February 2021	Adult hits	
WKEZ	"Z98.7"	Bluefield, Virginia	November 2019	Christmas music, then soft AC	
WKIM	"98.9 The Vibe"	Memphis, Tennessee	October 2017	Christmas music	
WNGY	"G 102.3"	Peoria, Illinois	December 2019	Rhythmic AC	
WPHI-FM	"Boom 103.9"	Philadelphia, Pennsylvania	December 2019	Urban contemporary	
WPHI-FM	"Boom 107.9"	Philadelphia, Pennsylvania	September 2016	Urban contemporary gospel	
WQKS-HD3	"Yo! 107.1"	Montgomery, Alabama		Format revived in 2014 on sister WQKS-HD2	
WRNN (AM)	"G 105.5"	Myrtle Beach, South Carolina	May 2018	Classic country	
WRWM	"93.9 The Beat"	Indianapolis, Indiana		Rhythmic AC, then top 40/CHR	
WSOL-FM	"V101.5"	Jacksonville, Florida	December 2019	Urban AC	
WLOR	"98.1 The Beat"	Huntsville, Alabama	June 2020	Urban contemporary	
WTMP	"AM 1150"	Tampa, Florida			
WTSL	"Hot 97.5"	Hanover, New Hampshire	July 2022	Adult contemporary	
WTZA	"Old School 99.3"	Atlanta, Georgia		Went off air due to interference complaints from WCON-FM; later moved to WTBS-LP and flipped to urban oldies	
WXYY	"G100"	Savannah, Georgia	February 2023	Rhythmic contemporary	
WBBF	"98.9 The Vibe"	Buffalo, New York	July 2023	Top 40 (CHR)	

== See also ==
- List of music radio formats
- Old-school hip-hop
- Golden age hip-hop
- Urban Contemporary
- Urban Adult Contemporary
- Rhythmic AC
