= WUMJ =

Radio station in Fayetteville, Georgia

Simulcast of WAMJ, Roswell
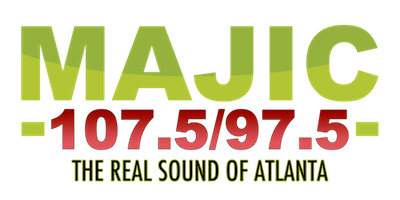
- Fayetteville, Georgia; United States
- Broadcast area: Metro Atlanta
- Frequency: 97.5 MHz (HD Radio)
- Branding: Majic 97.5/107.5

Programming
- Format: Urban adult contemporary
- Subchannels: HD2: Classix 102.9 (Urban oldies)
- Affiliations: Compass Media Networks, Premiere Networks

Ownership
- Owner: Urban One; (Radio One Licenses, LLC)
- Sister stations: WAMJ; WHTA; WPZE

History
- First air date: March 9, 1966
- Former call signs: WKEU-FM (1966–1990); WQUL (1990–1995); WHTA (1995–2001); WEGF (2001); WPZE (2001–2009)
- Former frequencies: 97.7 MHz (1966–1995)
- Call sign meaning: "Majic"

Technical information
- Licensing authority: FCC
- Facility ID: 3105
- Class: C3
- ERP: 8,500 watts
- HAAT: 165 meters (541 ft)
- Transmitter coordinates: 33°30′13.4″N 84°34′57.7″W

Links
- Public license information: Public file; LMS
- Webcast: Listen live
- Website: majicatl.com

WUMJ (97.5 FM, "Majic 107.5/97.5") is a radio station simulcasting an urban adult contemporary format with sister station WAMJ 107.5 FM. Licensed to the suburb of Fayetteville, Georgia, it serves the Atlanta metropolitan area. The station is currently owned by Urban One. Since 1995, it has always been an urban station taking on three variations of the format due to frequency swaps in 2001 and 2009.

== History ==
This station began in Griffin, Georgia, as WKEU-FM 97.7 on March 9, 1966. On September 3, 1990, the call sign was changed to WQUL as "Kool 97.7 FM".

=== Mainstream urban (1995–2001) ===
In 1994, Radio One (predecessor to Urban One) acquired WQUL from Design Media Inc. for $4.5 million. The station returned to the air July 3, 1995, on 97.5 MHz from a transmitter in Fayetteville. For its first month on air, the station used a makeshift studio setup at the transmitter site with leased equipment. Hot 97.5, with its rap- and hip-hop-heavy format, challenged the adult-oriented WVEE "V103" in the ratings. After operating from the ramshackle facility, which was nicknamed "Jurassic Park", the station established studios in College Park.

While the station was an initial moderate success among the young adult audience in the region (especially inner-city Atlanta), WHTA suffered a setback with its signal coverage. Due to the transmitter location and power, it was barely audible in the northern portions of Atlanta beyond the downtown area. When Radio One took over operations later on, there were plans to give WHTA a simulcast on 107.5 as WTHA until the new owners changed their minds instead and launched its adult urban format there as WAMJ. (This was the original incarnation of "Majic 107.5".) This led morning show host Ryan Cameron (now hosting mornings at WVEE) to lobby for a frequency change for WHTA by putting together a petition from listeners at the risk of losing his job under Radio One's management. It proved successful, and thus on November 1, 2001, owner Radio One finally moved the radio format and the WHTA call sign to the stronger 107.9 as "Hot 107.9" where it still airs today.

=== Urban gospel (2001–2009) ===
After WHTA relocated to 107.9, 97.5 FM relaunched as urban gospel station "Praise 97.5" with the call sign WEGF originally until December 5, 2001, when the call sign was again changed to WPZE. This was one of the earliest Radio One gospel stations marked with the "Praise" nickname which spread to its other stations over the course of the decade. In March 2007, WPZE began to carry the Yolanda Adams Morning Show based out of Houston via sister KROI-FM, although that station has since been moved to a subchannel of KMJQ in that same city. In 2008, WPZE went on to become the flagship for the locally based CoCo Brother Live Show, which airs in the early nighttime. CoCo Brother originally worked at WHTA before landing the show, and also hosts Lift Every Voice on BET. On February 16, 2009, the Praise branding moved to 102.5.

=== Urban adult contemporary (2009–2016) ===
After WPZE relocated to 102.5, the 97.5 frequency changed to a simulcast of Majic 107.5 with the new callsign WUMJ. This would also result in the end of smooth jazz music on 107.5 (then WJZZ) as the WAMJ call sign relocated back to that frequency to reincarnate the "Majic" branding there.

=== Classic hip hop (2016) ===
On January 10, 2016, WUMJ broke from the "Majic" simulcast and began simulcasting translator W275BK's classic hip hop format as "Boom 102.9/97.5". The change is coordinated with the debut of the syndicated Ed Lover Show in mornings starting on the 11th on Radio One's classic hip-hop stations. The addition of WUMJ increases Boom's coverage to the south of Atlanta, including the Peachtree City and Newnan areas. General Manager Tim Davies stated in a press release that most of Majic's audience moved over to 107.5 following the upgrade of its signal three years ago, making 97.5 expendable.

=== Urban adult contemporary (2016–present) ===
On July 29, 2016, WUMJ returned to a simulcast of urban adult contemporary-formatted Majic 107.5.
