= WXGI =

- Richmond, Virginia; United States
- Broadcast area: Richmond, Virginia; Petersburg, Virginia
- Frequency: 950 kHz
- Branding: 99.5 and 102.7 The Box

Programming
- Format: Classic hip hop

Ownership
- Owner: Urban One; (Radio One Licenses, LLC)
- Sister stations: WDCJ; WCDX; WKJM; WKJS; WPZZ

History
- First air date: 1947
- Former call signs: WXGI (1947–1989); WJDK (5/1989-10/1989)
- Call sign meaning: former ownership were World War II veterans ("ex-G.I.s")

Technical information
- Licensing authority: FCC
- Facility ID: 74207
- Class: D
- Power: 3,900 watts day; 45 watts night
- Transmitter coordinates: 37°30′52.5″N 77°30′26.9″W
- Translator: (99.5 FM) W258DC (Richmond)
- Repeaters: (1240 AM/ 102.7 FM) WDCJ/ W274BX (Petersburg); 92.1 WCDX-HD2 (Mechanicsville)

Links
- Public license information: Public file; LMS
- Webcast: Listen live
- Website: theboxrichmond.com

WXGI (950 AM) is a classic hip hop formatted radio station licensed to Richmond, Virginia. WXGI is owned and operated by Urban One. The station's studios and offices are located just north of Richmond proper on Emerywood Parkway in unincorporated Henrico County, and its transmitter is located in the Southside of Richmond.

WXGI serves the Richmond/Petersburg area of Virginia using four simulcast stations, WDCJ (1240 AM) and 102.7 FM (W274BX) in Petersburg, 99.5 FM (W258DC) in Richmond. The station is also on the HD2 sub channel of WCDX-HD2 in Mechanicsville.

== History ==
This station was signed on in the late 1940s by some ex World War II serviceman, which resulted in the call letters WXGI, as the station was founded by "ex-GIs" .

Throughout the 1950s, 1960s, 1970s, and early 1980s the station was a popular country music station. George "Pops" Popkins and Johnny Gee were some of the better known DJs on WXGI.

In 1979 the station was dealt a blow when one of its most popular DJs, Johnny Gee (real name John Gallaher), was kidnapped and murdered by the infamous Briley Brothers outside of a nightclub his band was playing at when he caught them attempting to break in his car. His body was later found washed up on the shore of the James River. The brothers were later executed for that and other murders in the early eighties.

The station went through hard times in the 190s due to increased FM competition from two powerful FM country stations, WTVR-FM and WKHK. At first they tried going head to head with the FMs as "I-95". In the mid eighties they adopted an adult contemporary format as "Bright 95" but due to an outcry by longtime country music fans returned to the country format by 1989, this time featuring more classic country that the FMs stations had abandoned and calling themselves "The Legend". Some of the DJ who were on WXGI during this period were "Big" John Trimble, David Holt, Gretchen Hart, Bill James, Gary Micheals, and Eric Slater.

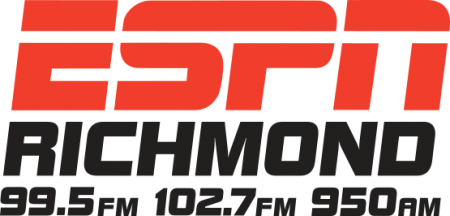
Last logo as a sports station

The station continued with the classic country format through the nineties and into the early 2000s, but then added a sports talk morning show with former WRNL morning host "Big" Al Coleman. Finally in 2004, the station abandoned music altogether for an all sports format adding programming from ESPN Radio.

In 2006, the station was purchased by Red Zebra Broadcasting, which was owned by Washington Redskins owner Daniel Snyder. Former CEO of Red Zebra, Bennett Zier, stated at the time, "I am excited about our continued growth and our new ability to serve loyal Redskins fans in and around Richmond. WXGI is the perfect addition to our new group of radio stations."

ESPN 950 was part of the Redskins Radio Network, which carried all Redskins games throughout the season. The station also broadcast local sports talk every weekday, including "The Black & Drew Sports Huddle", "Border to Border with Matt Josephs" and "Hardly Workin' with Greg Burton." In addition, WXGI carried Richmond Spiders football and basketball, Baltimore Orioles baseball, and other live sporting events syndicated by ESPN Radio, including Monday Night Football, MLB, NBA, and the College Football Playoffs. Some live sports from NBC Sports Radio were also heard on WXGI.

On February 1, 2014, WXGI began simulcasting most of its programming on Hoffman Communications' WZEZ (100.5 FM). That station was sold to the Educational Media Foundation and switched to a contemporary Christian music format as WLRB on November 2, 2016.

On April 26, 2017, Radio One purchased WXGI from Red Zebra.

On April 19, 2021, the ESPN Radio format moved to SummitMedia's 106.1 FM W291CL/ WURV-HD2 while WXGI changed its format to classic hip hop, branded as " 99.5 and 102.7 The Box".

== Translator ==
On December 20, 2017, WXGI began relaying its signal on its own FM translator station.

| Call sign | Frequency | City of license | FID | ERP (W) | HAAT | Class | FCC info |
|---|---|---|---|---|---|---|---|
| W258DC | 99.5 FM | Richmond, Virginia | 20934 | 250 | 275 m (902 ft) | D | LMS |
