= KKDA-FM =

Radio station in Dallas

- Dallas, Texas; United States
- Broadcast area: Dallas–Fort Worth metroplex
- Frequency: 104.5 MHz
- Branding: K104

Programming
- Language: English
- Format: Urban contemporary
- Affiliations: Compass Media Networks

Ownership
- Owner: Urban One; (Radio One Licenses, LLC)
- Sister stations: KRNB, KBFB

History
- First air date: 1947
- Former call signs: KIXL (1947–1972); KEZT (1972–1975)
- Call sign meaning: Dallas

Technical information
- Licensing authority: FCC
- Facility ID: 59702
- Class: C
- ERP: 99,000 watts
- HAAT: 508 meters (1,667 ft)
- Transmitter coordinates: 32°35′19″N 96°58′05″W

Links
- Public license information: Public file; LMS
- Webcast: Listen live
- Website: myk104.com

KKDA-FM (104.5 MHz), known on air as K104, is a radio station licensed to Dallas, Texas and serving the Dallas–Fort Worth metroplex broadcasting an urban contemporary format. It is owned by Urban One alongside KBFB and KRNB. Its studios are located in Arlington, Texas, and the transmitter site is in Cedar Hill.

== History ==
104.5 FM began operation on June 8, 1947, as KIXL. KIXL (pronounced "Kicksil") aired a successful beautiful music format, simulcast on both 104.5 FM and 1040 AM ("104 on both dials"). A pioneer in the "mood music" format, the station showed up in the top five in Dallas market ratings consistently through 1968, but by the beginning of the 1970s KIXL was facing tough competition from KOAX, which had come to dominate as the top-rated easy listening station. In 1973, the year Dallas and Fort Worth were combined into one radio market, KIXL dropped its heritage calls in favor of KEZT, continuing to play easy-listening musical fare. The change did not improve the station's fortunes, as KEZT never appeared in the top 10 of the Dallas/Fort Worth ratings, while KOAX's success continued and KTLC provided additional competition in the beautiful music format.

On December the 22nd of 1976, KEZT flipped to an Urban format and officially changed their call letters as KKDA-FM and adopted the moniker as the now legendary and iconic K104 under the leadership of new owner Hyman Childs. KKDA-FM Was initially the FM counterpart to KKDA-AM which aired R&B and soul during the day and gospel at night. KKDA-FM First primarily began as a disco station with the two slogans; "K104 Is Disco Soul!" and "K104 Is Disco!" But through the early to mid 1980s, KKDA-FM shifted to a Top 40/CHR/UC hybrid type format (also known as "Crossover" and "CHUrban", which is the predecessor to the current Rhythmic CHR format) while retaining the K104 moniker first in 1983 with "K104, This Is It!" then later in 1985 with "K104, Jammin' With The Music!" and after that in 1987 with "K104, People Power!" In the late 1980's the station was briefly known as "Hot 104, The All New KKDA-FM!" But that moniker would soon be officially get dropped and returned to the K104 name under new slogan "K104, We've Got It Goin' On!" (During the station's disco era K104 had a mascot that billed itself as The K104 Disco Chicken).

In the mid 1990s, under the leadership of new owner Ken Dowe and new PD Michael Spears, KKDA-FM skewed its former urban contemporary format with slower R&B and soul songs at night and gospel on Sunday mornings, towards the Mainstream Urban genre consisting of a hip-hop and current R&B heavy playlist. That format helped project K104 to being one of the highest-rated radio stations in the Dallas–Fort Worth DMA, where it has remained to this day.

Competitively, KKDA-FM also has a current crosstown rivalry with another Urban station KBFB ("97.9 The Beat"), who has taken advantage of KKDA-FM's 'traditional' Urban direction, resulting in the two competing for Urban dominance in the Metroplex. Their first competition until 1985 was the Urban radio station KNOK-FM (which used the slogan "Disco And More On KNOK 107 FM!"); their next competition was from 1988 to 1995 was station KJMZ (known as "100.3 Jamz!"). In addition, they once had a competitor in Rhythmic CHR rival KZZA also known better as ("Casa 106.7") which had shifted from a Hispanic Rhythmic direction since KKDA-FM also has a sizable share of Hispanic listeners. But however KZZA is a rimshot signal. KNOR was considered a competitor from 2004 to 2006 as it was the only station in the Metroplex having a similar format to KKDA-FM's UC format.

As the FCC loosened radio station ownership rules with the passing of the Telecommunications Act of 1996, virtually all major market radio stations became part of large broadcast groups such as iHeartMedia, Cumulus, and others.

Its longtime morning drive show, Skip Murphy and the Home Team, was ranked number 1 during the morning drive time slot for nearly a decade, according to Arbitron ratings. Over the last few years, several popular personalities on the show, such as comedian Nannette Lee and Wig, have moved on. The most recent personality to leave was Thomas "Skip" Murphy. He announced in July 2008 that he was moving to sister radio station KRNB to work weekdays from 3 pm to 7 pm. Nationally syndicated personality Tom Joyner became recognized as the "Fly Jock" because he hosted the morning drive slot on K104 and traveled regularly to host an afternoon drive slot on WGCI-FM in Chicago. His show was heard later on KRNB, and most recently aired on KZMJ.

On May 1, 2026, it was announced that KKDA-FM, and urban adult contemporary sister KRNB would be sold to Silver Spring, Maryland-based Urban One, while also selling KZMJ to Encouragement Media Group, a company focusing on Christian formats. This would result in overlap with rivaling KBFB, which runs an urban-leaning rhythmic CHR format. The KZMJ sale was completed on July 7 and the KKDA-FM and KRNB purchase was completed on July 17.

== Notable K104 Morning DJs ==
- Tom "The Fly Jock" Joyner 1983–1993
- Thomas "Skip" Murphy 1993-2008
- DeDe McGuire 2008-Today

== See also ==
- KKDA (Full service)
