= WPZE =

Radio station in Mableton–Atlanta, Georgia

- Mableton, Georgia; United States
- Broadcast area: Metro Atlanta
- Frequency: 102.5 MHz
- Branding: "Praise 102.5"

Programming
- Language: English
- Format: Urban gospel

Ownership
- Owner: Urban One; (New Mableton Broadcasting Corporation)
- Sister stations: WAMJ, WHTA, WUMJ

History
- First air date: 2001; 25 years ago
- Former call signs: WAWE (1997–2001); WAMJ (2001–2009)
- Call sign meaning: W PraiZE (play on "Praise")

Technical information
- Licensing authority: FCC
- Facility ID: 24562
- Class: A
- ERP: 3,000 watts
- HAAT: 143 meters (469 ft)
- Transmitter coordinates: 33°41′20.00″N 84°30′38.00″W

Links
- Public license information: Public file; LMS
- Webcast: Listen Live
- Website: www.mypraiseatl.com

WPZE (102.5 FM) is a commercial Christian radio station licensed to Mableton, Georgia, and serving Metro Georgia. It is owned by Urban One and airs an urban gospel radio format. Studios and offices are at Centennial Tower in Downtown Atlanta.

The effective radiated power (ERP) is 3,000 watts, making it a Class A FM station. The transmitter is in Southwest Atlanta, off Fairburn Road SW, near I-285.

== History ==
=== New Mableton Broadcasting Corp. ===
The station is the result of Docket 80-90, the Federal Communications Commission (FCC) plan to allow more stations on the air by reducing the required spacings. During the mid-1980s, it was decided that one of these new stations would be assigned to the west-northwest side of metro Atlanta. Several applicants requested the new allotment be assigned to one of four cities: Mableton, Lithia Springs, Douglasville, and Forest Park. The frequency already belonged to WGHR in Marietta, the student radio station at what is now Southern Polytechnic State University. However the forced downgrade to second-class status left the class D station vulnerable. It applied for the new allotment and to have it reserved to Marietta and as noncommercial but the FCC refused this, leaving WGHR with no chance of upgrading. The remaining contenders applied in 1988, and had a lengthy battle in court. After many years of legal wrangling over the frequency, the station came on the air in 2001, forcing WGHR at SPSU to move to 100.7, and then off the air completely due to WWWQ's move-in on 100.5.

The station on 102.5 was assigned the call sign WAWE on November 24, 1997 during its construction permit. The New Mableton Broadcasting Corporation had the FCC's permission to construct the station.

=== WAMJ "Grown Folks Radio" ===
On June 27, 2001, the station was then assigned the call letters WAMJ just before it went on the air. The call sign was moved from 107.5 FM, which then upgraded to a Class C3 station and took on the call sign WJZZ-FM, adopting a Smooth Jazz format. The Urban AC format from then-"Majic 107.5", which originated three years before, came along also, although the "Majic" nickname was never used throughout WAMJ's tenure on 102.5, and took on a more oldies approach to R&B. (Competitor WALR did this same tactic in 2003, but only because WFOX (now WSRV) was an experimental urban station for a few years.)

In April 2004, Radio One acquired the New Mableton Broadcast Corporation for approximately $35 million. Radio One operated 102.5 FM under a local marketing agreement (LMA) beginning in August 2001. Radio One then completed this acquisition during the fourth quarter of 2004, under the name ROA Licenses (Radio One Atlanta Licenses), which also owned WJZZ-FM, WPZE, and WHTA.

In October 2005, the station changed format to Urban Adult Contemporary with the addition of current R&B and soul songs, but moved back to an older playlist several months later. The station was branded as "Grown Folks Radio." When attempts to secure broadcasting rights to the popular syndicated Tom Joyner Morning Show failed, WAMJ began carrying The Steve Harvey Show in the mornings. It also carried syndicated talk programming including Al Sharpton program and Michael Baisden during the midday and afternoon hours. Evenings and weekends remained dedicated to music.

=== WPZE "Praise 102.5" ===
WPZE originated its current format in 2001 on 97.5 FM. On February 16, 2009, "Praise 97.5" and the WPZE call letters moved to 102.5 FM; in turn, the urban AC format moved to 107.5 FM. On the same date, 97.5 FM changed to a simulcast of 107.5 FM, using the call sign WUMJ. At this time, the WAMJ call sign was returned to 107.5 FM (formerly WJZZ-FM) to reunite with the "Majic" branding.

On May 8, 2017, Radio One changed its name to Urban One, to reflect its involvement in many forms of media including radio.
