= Urban One =

African American-owned media and radio broadcast company

Urban One, Inc.
- Formerly: Radio One, Inc. (1980–2017)
- Type: Public
- Traded as: Nasdaq: UONE (Class A); Nasdaq: UONEK (Class D) Russell Microcap Index component (UONEK); Nasdaq: ROIA (1999–2017)
- Industry: Broadcasting, Media
- Founded: 1980; 46 years ago
- Founder: Cathy Hughes
- Headquarters: 1010 Wayne Avenue, Silver Spring, Maryland, United States
- Area served: United States
- Key people: Cathy Hughes (chairman); Alfred C. Liggins III (president & CEO)
- Revenue: ▼US$ 441.4 million (2014)
- Operating income: ▲US$ 77.2 million (2014)
- Net income: ▲US$ -42.7 million (2014)
- Total assets: ▼US$ 1.4 billion (2014)
- Total equity: ▼US$ 18.9 million (2014)
- Number of employees: 1,011 (2015)
- Divisions: Interactive One; Reach Media; TV One Networks; TV One; Cleo TV
- Website: urban1.com

Urban One, Inc. (formerly Radio One) is an American media conglomerate based in Silver Spring, Maryland. Founded in 1980 by Cathy Hughes, the company primarily operates media properties targeting African Americans.

It is the largest African-American-owned broadcasting company in the United States, currently operating over 50 radio stations. The company also operates digital arm Interactive One, cable networks TV One & Cleo TV, and is a majority-owner of syndicator Reach Media.

As of 2014, it was the ninth-highest-earning African-American-owned business in the United States.

== History ==
=== Early years ===
Radio One was founded in 1980 by Cathy Hughes, with the purchase of Washington, D.C. AM radio station WOL for $995,000. She changed the station's programming format from all-music to one that examined politics and culture from an African American perspective. Hughes purchased her second station, WMMJ in Washington, seven years later, which began to turn a profit once she converted it into a rhythm and blues station. This established Radio One's early strategy of purchasing small, underperforming radio stations in urban markets and refocusing them to serve the demographics of their communities.

After joining the company in 1985 and managing its day-to-day operations since 1993, Hughes's son, Alfred C. Liggins III, took over as CEO in 1997, with Hughes becoming the board's chairperson. In 1995, Radio One purchased WKYS-FM in Washington, D.C., for $34 million, and also entered the Atlanta market by purchasing FM station WHTA for $4.5 million. In 1997, the company entered the Philadelphia market with its purchase of WPHI-FM for $20 million. The company added numerous stations in the late 1990s, including stations in Atlanta, St. Louis, Boston, Cleveland, Richmond, San Francisco, Detroit and Boston.

In 1996, Radio One moved its corporate offices from Washington, D.C., to Lanham, Maryland. The company is now based in Silver Spring, Maryland. Under the guidance of recently appointed CEO Liggins, Radio One went public on May 6, 1999, while continuing to be controlled by the family. The company's initial public offering was for 6.5 million shares at $24 per share. This made Hughes the first African American woman to chair a public company. As of 2010, Hughes and Liggins control 90% of Radio One's voting stock.

In 2000, Radio One purchased 12 stations for approximately $1.3 billion from Clear Channel, bringing Radio One into Los Angeles, Dallas, Houston and Miami, along with stations in Cleveland and Greenville, South Carolina. Soon after, Radio One added two more Dallas stations. In total, the company added 21 radio stations in 2000.

=== Further expansion ===
In 2001, Radio One expanded into 22 markets, with 18 million listeners, making it the nation's largest urban-market radio broadcasting company. In February, Radio One purchased rival company Blue Chip Broadcasting for approximately $135 million ($45 million cash with the remainder in stock). The purchase included 15 radio stations owned and operated by Cincinnati-based Blue Chip in Ohio, Minnesota and Kentucky. Earlier that month, Radio One had also purchased another Dallas radio station for $52.5 million. In June 2001, Radio One purchased Georgia radio station WPEZ-FM from US Broadcasting for $55 million.

In January 2004, Radio One launched the TV One cable network in a joint venture with Comcast.

In February, Radio One purchased country station WSNJ in Bridgeton, New Jersey, for $35 million; it had been on the air since 1937 and family-owned by the Ed and Katherine Bold family for over 50 years. The company would also purchase KRTS-FM in Houston for approximately $72.5 million in cash, giving it three stations in the Houston market.

In November 2004, Radio One acquired a 53% stake in Reach Media, a Texas-based media company owned by radio host Tom Joyner, for $56.1 million in cash and stock.

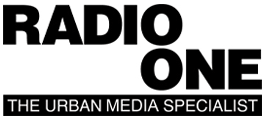
Radio One logo and slogan used until May 8, 2017.

From 2006 through the beginning of 2008, Radio One sold nearly $150 million in assets, primarily underperforming radio stations.

Radio One would reach a peak of owning over 70 stations in 22 markets by 2007, becoming the largest African-American-owned-and-operated broadcast company in the US. In January of that year, Radio One purchased GIANT magazine for $275,000.

However, that same year, Radio One would sell ten stations to Main Line Broadcasting for approximately $76 million in cash. The stations sold were in Radio One's markets with the smallest African American populations. The sale decreased the number of Radio One's stations from 71 to 61.

In 2008, Radio One launched its Interactive One subsidiary. The company also acquired social networking firm Community Connect, the parent company of BlackPlanet, AsianAvenue and MiGente, for $38 million. BlackPlanet at the time had 20 million members and was the nation's fourth-most visited social networking site.

In December 2009, the company suspended publication of the print version of the bi-monthly magazine, relaunching it online as GIANTLife.com. The website is a part of the Interactive One network.

In 2011, Radio One changed stations in Houston, Cincinnati and Columbus, Ohio, from African American to general interest formats, due to low ratings. In May 2018, they purchased Washington, D.C. sports station "The Team 980" WTEM from Washington Commanders owner Dan Snyder's Red Zebra Broadcasting.

=== Rebranding as Urban One ===
On May 8, 2017, Radio One was renamed Urban One. Radio One would be retained as the company's secondary name, and as a name for its radio division.

On January 19, 2019, Urban One launched Cleo TV, a cable channel aimed at millennial and Generation X African American women.

In April 2023, it was announced that Urban One would acquire the Houston radio cluster of Cox Media Group. This, at the time of the sale, would have resulted in Urban One being over FCC ownership limits, forcing the divestitures of 2 stations in the combined cluster; the stations to be sold were later determined by the two companies to be KROI and Cox's KTHT, which would be placed into the temporary Sugarland Station Trust divestiture trust, overseen by Scott Knoblauch. It was reported that Urban was already in the process of negotiations for KROI with a "minority-owned" broadcaster marking their entry into the market; on April 20, it was announced said broadcaster was Spanish Broadcasting System, who would ultimately buy the station for $7.5 million.

== Assets ==
=== Stations ===
As of June 2026, Urban One's Radio One division operates 56 radio stations in 13 markets.

Market	Station and Frequency	Owned since	Format	Notes
Atlanta	WAMJ 107.5 FM	1998	Urban adult contemporary	Licensed to Roswell, Georgia
Atlanta	WHTA 107.9 FM	2001	Urban contemporary	Licensed to Hampton, Georgia
Atlanta	WPZE 102.5 FM	2004	Urban gospel	Licensed to Mableton, Georgia
Atlanta	WUMJ 97.5 FM	1995	Urban adult contemporary	Licensed to Fayetteville, Georgia
Baltimore	WERQ-FM 92.3 FM	1993	Urban contemporary	
Baltimore	WOLB 1010 AM		Urban talk	
Baltimore	WWIN 1400 AM		Urban gospel	
Baltimore	WWIN-FM 95.9 FM	1992	Urban adult contemporary	Licensed to Glen Burnie, Maryland
Charlotte	WBT 1110 AM	2020	Redirect Loop (since 1/8/2026)	WBT (AM) is running a loop telling listeners to tune to WBT-FM.
Charlotte	WBT-FM 107.9 FM	2020	News/Talk	
Charlotte	WPZS 610 AM	2020	Urban gospel	
Charlotte	WFNZ-FM 92.7 FM	1998	Sports	Licensed to Harrisburg, North Carolina
Charlotte	WOSF 105.3 FM	2012	Urban adult contemporary	Licensed to Gaffney, South Carolina
Cincinnati	WDBZ 1230 AM	2007	Urban talk/urban contemporary	
Cincinnati	WIZF 101.1 FM	1998	Mainstream urban	Licensed to Erlanger, Kentucky
Cincinnati	WOSL 100.3 FM	2006	Urban oldies-leaning urban adult contemporary	Licensed to Norwood, Ohio
Cleveland	WENZ 107.9 FM	1999	Mainstream urban	
Cleveland	WERE 1490 AM	2000	Talk radio	
Cleveland	WJMO 1300 AM	1999	Tropical music	Station is operated by La Mega Media.
Cleveland	WZAK 93.1 FM	2000	Urban adult contemporary	
Columbus, Ohio	WCKX 107.5 FM		Urban contemporary	
Columbus, Ohio	WJYD 106.3 FM	late 1990s	Urban gospel	Licensed to London, Ohio
Columbus, Ohio	WWLG 107.1 FM	2015	Regional Mexican/Spanish-language	Licensed to Circleville, Ohio
Columbus, Ohio	WXMG 95.5 FM	2015	Urban adult contemporary	Licensed to Lancaster, Ohio
Dallas/Fort Worth	KBFB 97.9 FM	2000	Urban contemporary	
Dallas/Fort Worth	KKDA-FM 104.5 FM	2026	Urban contemporary	
Dallas/Fort Worth	KRNB 105.7 FM	2026	Urban adult contemporary	Licensed to Decatur, Texas
Houston	KBXX 97.9 FM	2000	Urban contemporary	
Houston	KGLK 107.5 FM	2023	Classic rock	both KGLK and KHPT are simulcasts. KGLK is licensed to Lake Jackson, Texas; KHPT is licensed to Conroe, Texas
Houston	KHPT 106.9 FM	2023	Classic rock	both KGLK and KHPT are simulcasts. KGLK is licensed to Lake Jackson, Texas; KHPT is licensed to Conroe, Texas
Houston	KKBQ 92.9 FM	2023	Country	Licensed to Pasadena, Texas
Houston	KMJQ 102.1 FM	2000	Urban adult contemporary	Operates an urban gospel format on KMJQ-HD2
Indianapolis
Indianapolis	WHHH 100.9 FM		Urban contemporary	Licensed to Speedway, Indiana
Indianapolis	WIBC 93.1 FM	2022	News/Talk	
Indianapolis	WLHK 97.1 FM	2022	Country	Licensed to Shelbyville, Indiana
Indianapolis	WTLC 1310 AM	2001	Urban gospel	
Indianapolis	WTLC-FM 106.7 FM	2001	Urban adult contemporary	Licensed to Greenwood, Indiana
Indianapolis	WYXB 105.7 FM	2022	Adult contemporary	
Philadelphia
Philadelphia	WPPZ-FM 107.9 FM	2000	Urban oldies	Licensed to Pennsauken, New Jersey
Philadelphia	WRNB 100.3 FM	2001	Urban adult contemporary	Licensed to Media, Pennsylvania
Raleigh/Durham	WFXC 107.1 FM	2000	Urban adult contemporary	both WFXC and WFXK are simulcasts. WFXC is licensed to Durham, North Carolina; WFXK is licensed to Bunn, North Carolina
Raleigh/Durham	WFXK 104.3 FM	2000	Urban adult contemporary	both WFXC and WFXK are simulcasts. WFXC is licensed to Durham, North Carolina; WFXK is licensed to Bunn, North Carolina
Raleigh/Durham	WNNL 103.9 FM	2000	Urban gospel	Licensed to Fuquay-Varina, North Carolina
Raleigh/Durham	WQOK 97.5 FM	2000	Urban contemporary	Licensed to Carrboro, North Carolina
Richmond, Virginia	WCDX 92.1 FM		Urban contemporary	Licensed to Mechanicsville, Virginia
Richmond, Virginia	WKJM 99.3 FM		Urban adult contemporary	both WKJM and WKJS are simulcasts. WKJM is licensed to Petersburg, Virginia
Richmond, Virginia	WKJS 105.7 FM		Urban adult contemporary	both WKJM and WKJS are simulcasts. WKJM is licensed to Petersburg, Virginia
Richmond, Virginia	WPZZ 104.7 FM	1999	Urban gospel	Licensed to Crewe, Virginia
Richmond, Virginia	WXGI 950 AM	2017	Classic hip hop	both WXGI and WDCJ are simulcasts. WDCJ is licensed to Petersburg, Virginia
Richmond, Virginia	WDCJ 1240 AM	2017	Classic hip hop	both WXGI and WDCJ are simulcasts. WDCJ is licensed to Petersburg, Virginia
Washington, D.C.	WLNO 104.1 FM	2017	Spanish-language Contemporary Hit Radio	Licensed to Waldorf, Maryland
Washington, D.C.	WKYS 93.9 FM	early 1990s (?)	Urban contemporary	
Washington, D.C.	WMMJ 102.3 FM	1987	Urban oldies-leaning urban adult contemporary	Licensed to Bethesda, Maryland
Washington, D.C.	WOL 1450 AM	1980	Urban talk	First property of Radio One and its flagship
Washington, D.C.	WPRS 92.7 FM	2006	Urban gospel	Licensed to Prince Frederick, Maryland
Washington, D.C.	WYCB 1340 AM	1996	Urban Gospel	

=== TV One Networks ===
TV One Networks is the unit that oversees Urban One's cable networks.

On January 19, 2004, Martin Luther King Jr.'s birthday, Urban One launched TV One in a joint venture with Comcast. The network primarily produces and airs African American entertainment, lifestyle, and scripted programming.

A sister network aimed at young millennial and Generation X African American women, Cleo TV, would launch in January 2019.

=== Interactive One ===
Interactive One (also known as iOne), launched in 2008, is Urban One's online portfolio of digital brands complementing other media companies. The unit operates numerous digital brands, including NewsOne (a news website which curates stories from other media sources for an African-American audience), The Urban Daily, and Hello Beautiful. By 2011, Interactive was the largest network of owned and operated sites aimed at an African-American audience, and by 2014, had reached over 18 million unique monthly users on its platform through over 80 national and local brands.

In 2011, Interactive One entered into an editorial and sales partnership with NBC News, aligning NewsOne with NBC's The Grio.

In 2013, Interactive One had a partnership with Global Grind, a website founded by Russell Simmons and focused on pop culture and music content for African American and Hispanic audiences. Global Grind was subsequently acquired by Interactive One on December 17, 2014. In 2015, Interactive One launched HB Studios, a video production studio focused on creating scripted and unscripted programming about women and the diversity of their experiences. The programming will be featured on the iOne Women Channel, HelloBeautiful.com, YouTube and Facebook.

=== Reach Media ===
Reach Media is a Texas-based media company founded by radio host Tom Joyner.

In November 2004, Radio One acquired a 53% stake in Reach for $56.1 million in cash and stock. The deal also gave Radio One ownership rights to Joyner's syndicated Tom Joyner Morning Show, which was at the time airing on 115 stations to 8 million listeners; and news website BlackAmericaWeb.com, which had at the time approximately 800,000 members, giving Radio One its first strong Internet presence.

In 2005, Radio One and Reach Media launched a new African-American-centered talk radio network, with programming hosted by the Reverend Al Sharpton, to be broadcast on up to 10 of Radio One's stations, as well as stations owned by other companies.

In December 2012, under a new deal, Radio One increased its ownership stake in Reach Media to 80%. That same month, Radio One announced that the following year, it would merge its "Syndication One" urban programming lineup with Reach Media.

== See also ==
- Inner City Broadcasting Corporation
- Cathy Hughes
- Tom Joyner
- List of U.S. states by African-American population
- List of U.S. metropolitan areas with large African-American populations
- List of U.S. communities with African American majority populations
- List of African American neighborhoods
- List of African-American newspapers and media outlets
