= WSNJ =

- Bridgeton, New Jersey; United States
- Broadcast area: South Jersey
- Frequency: 1240 kHz
- Branding: 95.1 WSNJ

Programming
- Format: Active rock

Ownership
- Owner: Loud Media; (Loud Media NJ, LLC)

History
- First air date: August 1937
- Former names: 99.9 FM SNJ Today (2013-2020); POP FM 99.9 (2020-2025)
- Call sign meaning: South New Jersey

Technical information
- Licensing authority: FCC
- Facility ID: 12212
- Class: C
- ERP: 1,000 watts
- Transmitter coordinates: 39°27′32.4″N 75°12′10.7″W
- Translator: See § Translators

Links
- Public license information: Public file; LMS
- Webcast: Listen live
- Website: www.951wsnj.com

WSNJ (1240 AM) is a commercial radio station licensed to Bridgeton, New Jersey. It is owned by Loud Media, and it airs an active rock format oriented to Wilmington, Delaware.

WSNJ is powered at 1,000 watts and its transmitter is off South Burlington Road in Upper Deerfield Township. WSNJ is also heard on two FM translators, one broadcasting on 95.1 FM and one on 105.7 FM.

== History ==
In August 1937, WSNJ signed on the air. It was owned by Eastern States Broadcasting and was powered at 100 watts. For a time it broadcast on 1210 kHz. In 1941, it moved to its current frequency at 1240 kHz. It got a boost in power to 250 watts.

Its former FM simulcast, WSNJ-FM 107.7, ceased broadcasting on February 2, 2004. Lynn Timberman gave her final announcement about the FM sign-off. The WSNJ-FM license was moved to 107.9 MHz in Pennsauken, where it serves the Philadelphia area as WPPZ-FM.

In the 2010s, WSNJ signed on its first FM translator, W260BW, on 99.9 FM in Bridgeton, New Jersey, which has since moved to Swedesboro, New Jersey, and has increased its power and height. In 2018, WSNJ signed on its second FM translator, W260DK (now W289CY), in Milmay, New Jersey. W260BW is heard in Salem County and Gloucester County. W289CY is heard in Cumberland County and Atlantic County.

On June 4, 2020, 1240 AM and 99.9 FM rebranded to "POP FM 99.9", still retaining its full-service classic hits and adult contemporary format; "POP" is an acronym for "Power of Positivity".

On February 21, 2025, WSNJ was sold by SNJ Today, LLC to Loud Media NJ, LLC for $225,000. As of August 3, 2025, the station aired a temporary automated, commercial-free variety format featuring hits ranging from the 1950s to the 2010s, under the branding "Random Music Radio". The format has been reported to have been broadcasting on the station since as early as July 20, 2025, although it has likely been on the air since the station was sold in February 2025. Loud Media, LLC (parent company of Loud Media NJ, LLC) has also used this format on WKVL, before switching to a 1990s-2000s hits format after a year. All previous independent on-air programming has been removed since the sale to Loud Media NJ, LLC. All online platforms operated by the station have also been abandoned since the sale, including their old website, Facebook page, Instagram page, YouTube channel, and all webcasts of the station.

On September 24, 2025, translator 99.9 FM W260BW was moved to 95.1 FM and switched its callsign to W236EA. Although the transmitter has not changed, the city of license was updated from Swedesboro, New Jersey, to Wilmington, Delaware. The former POP 99.9 FM website was also updated with an “under construction” message.

On October 6, 2025, WSNJ changed its format from variety to active rock, branded as "95.1 WSNJ".

== Translators ==
Broadcast translators for WSNJ
Call sign	Frequency	City of license	FID	ERP (W)	HAAT	Class	Transmitter coordinates	FCC info
W236EA	95.1 FM	Wilmington, Delaware	151086	17	222 m (728 ft)	D	39°41′43.30″N 75°17′54.80″W	LMS
W289CY	105.7 FM	Millville, New Jersey	200737	250	19 m (62 ft)	D	39°24′27.10″N 75°1′50.60″W	LMS
