= WPPZ-FM =

- Pennsauken, New Jersey; United States
- Broadcast area: Philadelphia metropolitan area
- Frequency: 107.9 MHz (HD Radio)
- Branding: Classix 107.9

Programming
- Format: Urban oldies
- Subchannels: HD2: Urban gospel "Praise 107.9 HD2"

Ownership
- Owner: Urban One; (Radio One Licenses, LLC)
- Sister stations: WRNB

History
- First air date: March 1, 1948
- Former call signs: WSNJ-FM (1946–2004); WPPZ (2004); WRNB (2004–2011); WPHI-FM (2011–2016)
- Former frequencies: 98.9 MHz (1948–1961); 107.7 MHz (1961–2004)
- Call sign meaning: "Philadelphia Praise" (former branding and format now on HD2)

Technical information
- Licensing authority: FCC
- Facility ID: 12211
- Class: A
- ERP: 780 watts (analog); 31 watts (digital)
- HAAT: 276 meters (906 ft)
- Transmitter coordinates: 39°57′9.4″N 75°10′3.6″W

Links
- Public license information: Public file; LMS
- Webcast: Listen live; HD2: Listen live
- Website: classixphilly.com; HD2: praisephilly.com

WPPZ-FM (107.9 MHz) is a commercial radio station licensed to serve Pennsauken, New Jersey, in the Philadelphia radio market. The station is owned by Urban One, through licensee Radio One Licenses, LLC, and broadcasts an urban oldies format. Studios are located in Bala Cynwyd and the broadcast tower used by the station is located atop One Liberty Place in Center City, Philadelphia, at (39°57′9.4″N 75°10′5.0″W).

WPPZ-FM uses HD Radio, and broadcasts an urban gospel format on its HD2 subchannel branded as Praise 107.9 HD2.

== History ==
On March 1, 1948, the station signed on at 98.9 MHz as WSNJ-FM in Bridgeton, New Jersey, a farming community about 35 miles (56 km) south of Philadelphia. It was owned by Eastern States Broadcasting Company. At first, it simulcast its sister station, WSNJ (1240 AM). In the early 1960s, it became an affiliate of the WQXR Classical Network, based in New York City.

In the 1961, WSNJ-FM's frequency moved to 107.7 MHz, after a frequency swap with the Philadelphia Bulletin's WPBS, and the station resumed simulcasting the middle of the road format of popular music and news on WSNJ. In 1971, WSNJ-AM-FM were sold to Cohanzick Broadcasting, which held the license until the station's move to the Philadelphia suburbs.

In February 2004, the station's frequency and city of license were changed to allow it to move into the more lucrative Philadelphia market. To clear space on the FM band for the new operation, high school station WHHS was moved from 107.9 to 99.9 MHz and a Philadelphia translator of classical station WWFM was taken off the air. During transmitter testing, 107.9 used the call sign WPPZ and broadcast gospel music; owner Radio One eventually gave that call sign and format a permanent home in the market on 103.9 FM. (Before WRNB went on the air in 2004, the call sign was used for a Radio One-owned sister station in Dayton, Ohio, now called WROU-FM.) The new permanent urban AC format as WRNB went on the air on February 4, 2005. Radio One paid $35 million for the "move-in" FM station, which was now able to attract Philadelphia listeners and advertisers.

On September 1, 2011, Radio One moved WRNB's programming to 100.3, and the urban contemporary format of WPHI-FM (which moved away from rhythmic contemporary earlier that year) moved to the weaker signal 107.9 FM as "Hot 107.9" (after stunting that weekend as "Michael Vick Radio" and "Rickey Smiley Radio") on September 4 at 5 p.m.. The first song on "Hot" was Hot In Herre by Nelly.

On November 6, 2014, at 7 p.m., WPHI dropped the "Hot" format and became the fourth classic hip-hop station in the United States (following KNRJ in Phoenix, KDAY/KDEY in Los Angeles and sister station KROI in Houston) as "Boom 107.9". The last song on "Hot" was I Like It by Sevyn Streeter, while the first song on "Boom" was 99 Problems by Jay-Z.

On September 27, 2016, at midnight, WPHI and WPPZ swapped formats and call signs with "Boom" moving to 103.9 FM, and the "Praise" gospel format moving to 107.9 FM. (With the change, WPHI's classic hip hop format shifted to urban contemporary, returning the format to the 103.9 frequency for the first time since 2002 and marking the fourth attempt by Radio One to compete against long dominant WUSL.)

On December 10, 2018, WPPZ flipped to urban oldies branded as "Classix 107.9"; the "Praise" programming was moved to the HD2 subchannel.
