= KBFB =

Coordinates: 32.584°N 96.964°W

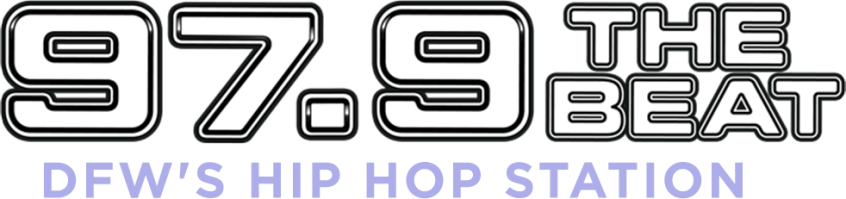
- Dallas, Texas; United States
- Broadcast area: Dallas–Fort Worth metroplex
- Frequency: 97.9 MHz (HD Radio)
- Branding: 97.9 The Beat

Programming
- Format: Urban contemporary
- Subchannels: HD2: Silent; HD3: Tejano music

Ownership
- Owner: Urban One; (Radio One Licenses, LLC)
- Sister stations: KRNB; KKDA-FM

History
- First air date: January 6, 1961
- Former call signs: WFAA-FM (1961–1973); KZEW (1973–1990); KKWM (1990–1991); KLRX (1991–1993); KRRW (1993–1997)
- Call sign meaning: The "B" is taken from "B-97.9", former adult contemporary station

Technical information
- Licensing authority: FCC
- Facility ID: 9627
- Class: C
- ERP: 100,000 watts
- HAAT: 574 meters (1,883 ft)
- Translators: 92.9 K225DD (McKinney); 95.3 K237HG (Cedar Hill); 104.9 K285HJ (Dallas); HD3: 92.9 K225BR (Fort Worth); HD3: 106.5 K293CM (Dallas)

Links
- Public license information: Public file; LMS
- Website: thebeatdfw.com

KBFB (97.9 FM) is a commercial radio station with an urban contemporary radio format, known as "97.9 The Beat." It is licensed to Dallas, Texas and serves the Dallas–Fort Worth metroplex. KBFB is owned by Urban One. KBFB's studios and offices are in the Galleria Area in North Dallas.

KBFB has an effective radiated power (ERP) of 100,000 watts. The station's transmitter is off Plateau Street in Cedar Hill, amid the towers for other Dallas–Fort Worth area FM and TV stations. KBFB broadcasts using HD Radio technology.

== History ==
=== The Belo/Cox years ===
The earliest predecessor of KBFB was a station that signed on October 5, 1946. KERA-FM–unrelated to today's public media operation in Dallas, KERA (90.1 FM) and KERA-TV (channel 13)–was owned by the Belo Corporation, and was the first FM radio station to go on the air in Texas. It was called

Even before KERA-FM's first day on the air, there was an experimental FM station "W5X1C" that began tests on October 15, 1945, and another trial dating back to 1939. By 1947, KERA-FM had moved from its original home at 94.3 FM to 97.9 FM under the WFAA-FM call sign, initially simulcasting its AM sister station WFAA (570 AM). With FM broadcasting in its infancy, Belo decided that the FM simulcast was not worthwhile and took WFAA-FM off the air on September 1, 1950.

The frequency remained dormant until 1958, when Belo decided to revive WFAA-FM, receiving a construction permit and putting WFAA-FM back on the air on January 6, 1961. After simulcasting WFAA for a few years, a beautiful music format was established in 1965. The station played quarter-hour sweeps of mostly instrumental cover versions of popular songs, designed for relaxing or unobtrusive office listening.

On September 16, 1973, WFAA-FM flipped to album-oriented rock (AOR) as KZEW, known to listeners as "The Zoo". It featured disc jockeys such as John LaBella and John Rody ("LaBella and Rody"), George Gimarc, Charley Jones, Dave Lee Austin, John B. Wells, Nancy Johnson, John Dew, John Dillon, Doc Morgan and Tempie Lindsey. The station's concept and programming were initially under the direction of Ira Lipson. The FM station shared studios with WFAA on the second floor of the facility. The FM station was so popular that in several years, WFAA switched to a classic rock format as KRQX.

Lite 97.9 FM logo used from 1990 to 1993.

In 1987, KZEW and KRQX were sold by Belo (which retained ownership of the Dallas Morning News and WFAA-TV) to Atlanta-based Cox Radio. On December 11, 1989, KZEW dropped the rock format and began stunting with Christmas music. On January 1, 1990, KZEW switched formats to soft adult contemporary, changing its call sign to KKWM and rebranded as "Warm 97.9". A year later, the station changed its call sign again, this time to KLRX, and updated its branding to "Lite 97.9".

=== The Infinity/CBS years ===
In 1993, the station was sold to CBS Radio, and on October 15, at 7 pm, KLRX flipped to a classic hits/classic rock format under the KRRW call letters, branded as "Arrow 97.9".

On April 3, 1997, the station switched back to adult contemporary as B-97.9 and changed its call sign to KBFB.

=== Urban Contemporary ===
KBFB flipped to urban contemporary as "97.9 The Beat" on September 26, 2000, after the station was sold to Radio One, a forerunner to Urban One. Since launch, the station has been in direct competition against longtime heritage urban station KKDA-FM. KBFB and KKDA-FM also had a competitor with former rhythmic contemporary rival KZZA until the station flipped to Spanish oldies in early 2009.

In the beginning, the morning show on the station was hosted by Russ Parr (who started his radio career at KJMZ in the Metroplex). In 2003, it was home to the Steve Harvey Morning Show through a syndicated simulcast from its sister station in Los Angeles, KKBT (also nicknamed "The Beat"). Eventually, Radio One switched KBFB's early slot to the Rickey Smiley Morning Show in 2005. Smiley was dropped in fall 2017, and was replaced with The Morning Hustle.

In May 2026, Urban One announced that it would be purchasing its rivals KKDA-FM and KRNB, while selling KZMJ to Encouragement Media Group, who flipped that station's format to Spanish Christian radio. The KZMJ sale was completed on July 7 and the KKDA-FM and KRNB purchase was completed on July 17. In preparation of the then-upcoming close of the sales, Urban One moved The Rickey Smiley Morning Show from KZMJ back to KBFB.

== HD programming ==
Since the mid 2000s, KBFB has broadcast in HD Radio, though it never had a secondary HD multicast until March 2014. At that time, KBFB-HD2 began siulcasting Gainesville–based sister station KZMJ. After 94.5 was divested and changed to Spanish Christian station KFZN, the HD2 subchannel was shut off.

In February 2018, KBFB began broadcasting Vietnamese–language programming on HD3. This was later switched to a Spanish Christian radio format, also simulcasting on translators K293CM on 106.5 FM in Dallas and K225BR 92.9 FM in Fort Worth. As of January 2026, KBFB-HD3 had shifted to Tejano music as "Puro Tejano 106.5".
