= The Free Lance–Star =

Local newspaper in Fredericksburg, Virginia

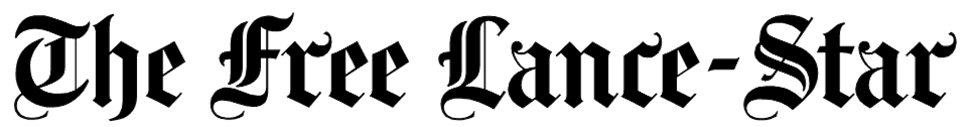
- Type: Daily newspaper
- Format: Broadsheet
- Owner: Lee Enterprises
- Editor: Jake Womer
- Founded: January 27, 1885; 141 years ago
- Language: English
- Headquarters: 1420 Central Park Blvd; Suite 101; Fredericksburg, Virginia 22401
- Country: United States
- Circulation: 14,362 Daily; 15,376 Sunday (as of 2023)
- ISSN: 2157-4979
- OCLC number: 31810388
- Website: fredericksburg.com

The Free Lance–Star is the principal daily newspaper distributed throughout Fredericksburg, Virginia, United States, with a circulation area including the city of Fredericksburg and all or parts of the counties of Spotsylvania, Stafford, King George, Caroline, Culpeper, Fauquier, Louisa, Orange, Prince William and Westmoreland.

== History ==
The Free Lance was first published on January 27, 1885, when Col. John W. Woltz and William E. Bradley founded the paper as a twice-weekly publication to serve the news and advertising needs of the community. A one-year subscription that first year cost $1.50. In 1900, the Free Lance operation merged with its competitor, The Fredericksburg Daily Star. The two papers continued to be published separately until 1926 when, under the leadership of Josiah P. Rowe Jr. (a World War One fighter pilot with the 147th Aero Squadron November 1917 to November 1918), they were combined into The Free Lance–Star, a single newspaper published 6 days a week.

The paper has occupied three addresses in its history. The offices of The Free Lance, and later the Daily Star and The Free Lance–Star, were at 303 William St in Fredericksburg. In 1965 the newspaper moved to 616 Amelia Street where it remained until December 2016. Currently, the Free Lance-Star offices are located at 1340 Central Park Blvd. Ste 100. Charles and Josiah Rowe inherited the paper from their father in 1949, and in 1997, upon Charles' retirement, the family of Josiah P. Rowe III purchased total ownership of the business.

The Free Lance–Star was owned and operated by members of the Rowe family from 1926 until 2014, when The Free Lance–Star Publishing Co. filed for bankruptcy. The newspaper was purchased by Sandton Capital Partners on June 19, 2014, ending the Rowe family's involvement. BH Media acquired The Free Lance–Star in 2015. In 2020, Lee Enterprises purchased BH Media's papers.

== Star Radio Group ==
WFLS (AM), the company's first radio station housed at the same location, went on the air in 1960. WFLS-FM was added to the company in 1961. Later on, in 1994, The Star Radio Group bought 99.3 WYSK: The Rock Alternative The company purchased WWUZ, a classic rock-formatted station out of Bowling Green in 2001. In 2009, WYSK became 99.3 The Vibe (WVBX), advertised as "Fredericksburg's #1 Hit Music Station. In September 2010, the company added a sports talk station, ESPN The Game, at AM 1350 and FM 96.5. In March 2012, WWUZ became 96.9 The Rock, advertised as "Your Classic Rock Station". BH Media did not acquire the radio stations.

In the mid-1990s the company maintained a web presence under FLStarWeb.com. Those efforts have since shifted to fredericksburg.com. In 1984, The Free Lance–Star was named by Time magazine as one of two top small daily newspapers in the country.

== Sponsoring ==
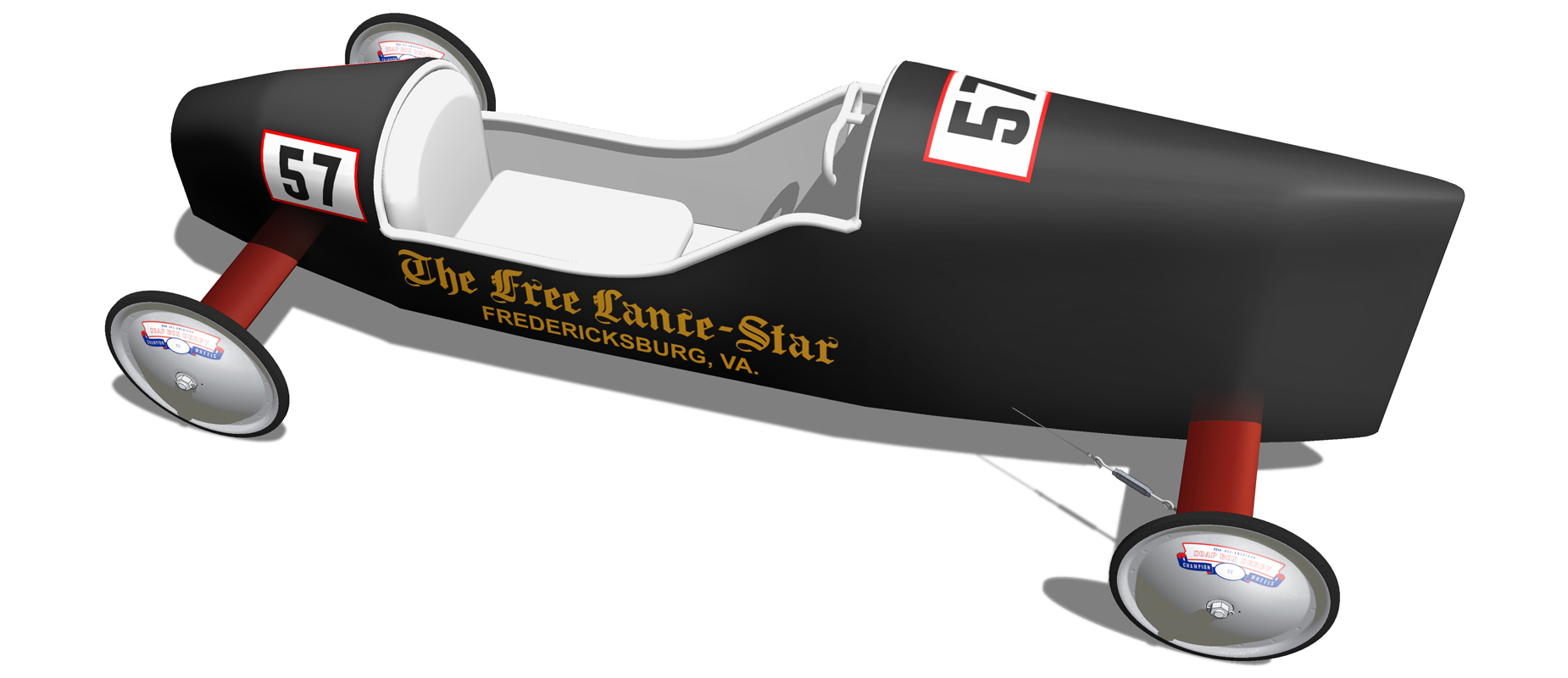
A Free Lance-Star-sponsored Soap Box Derby racer from 1959

The Free Lance–Star has been the title and secondary sponsor of several events in Fredericksburg, such as the Free Lance–Star Classic All-American Soap Box Derby (which for many years has been the biggest Soap Box race in the country), and The Great Train Race & Caboose Run, a youth mile run through downtown Fredericksburg. The newspaper is no longer affiliated with the derby. The newspaper does co-sponsor the regional spelling bee.

=== The Free Lance–Star Classic ===
The race was run on William Street in downtown from 1951 to 1972. The AASBD was incapable of running after the loss of Chevrolet as the national sponsor. This left many towns and communities with no local race.

For many years, Fredericksburg, Virginia had gone without a local derby. In 1996, Ralph "Tuffy" Hicks, a city councilman, brought up the idea of bringing the race back to Fredericksburg. The City Council agreed to this idea, because they thought that it would be a great activity for the community to get together. The running of the derby would be the responsibility of the Fredericksburg Parks and Recreation Department. Many local businesses purchased cars and donated what was needed to get the race going. The first race was in 1997, 25 years since it had stopped.

The first title sponsor of the race in 1997 was Purvis Ford, a local Ford dealership. In the first year of the new race, there were 85 racers in two divisions, Stock and Super Stock. As of 1998, the race had increased by 40 racers, bringing the total drivers to 125.

In 2000, The Free Lance–Star became the title sponsor of the Fredericksburg Derby. By 2001, The Free Lance-Star Classic was the largest local race in the country. In 2004, the Masters Division was added to the race, so that there would be options for different age groups. This made for three champions sent to Akron, Ohio, where the Nationals are held.

== See also ==
- Clay Jones (staff editorial cartoonist)
