= WCDX =

Radio station in Mechanicsville, Virginia

- Mechanicsville, Virginia; United States
- Broadcast area: Richmond–Petersburg
- Frequency: 92.1 MHz (HD Radio)
- Branding: iPower 92-1 and 104-1

Programming
- Format: Urban contemporary
- Subchannels: HD2: WXGI simulcast

Ownership
- Owner: Urban One; (Radio One Licenses, LLC)
- Sister stations: WKJM; WKJS; WPZZ; WDCJ; WXGI

History
- First air date: October 7, 1985
- Former call signs: WPUF (1984–1985); WZZR (1985–1987)

Technical information
- Licensing authority: FCC
- Facility ID: 60473
- Class: B1
- ERP: 4,500 watts
- HAAT: 235 meters (771 ft)
- Transmitter coordinates: 37°36′52.5″N 77°30′55″W
- Translator: See § Translator

Links
- Public license information: Public file; LMS
- Webcast: Listen live
- Website: www.ipowerrichmond.com

WCDX (92.1 FM) is an urban contemporary formatted broadcast radio station licensed to Mechanicsville, Virginia, United States, serving the Richmond/Petersburg area. WCDX is owned and operated by Urban One. The station's studios and offices are located just north of Richmond proper on Emerywood Parkway in unincorporated Henrico County, and its transmitter is located separately a mile east of the studios.

WCDX is licensed by the FCC to broadcast in the HD Radio format.

== Alumni ==
Juan Conde, who later became evening news anchor for local ABC affiliate WRIC-TV, was WCDX's morning man for most of the 1990s.

== WCDX-HD2 ==
WCDX-HD2 broadcasts a simulcast of Classic Hip Hop-formatted sister stations. WXGI licensed to Richmond & WDCJ licensed to Petersburg on its HD2 sub channel. On December 20, 2017 WXGI's FM Translator began relaying this signal at 99.5 FM (W258DC). In conjunction with WXGI this signal is relayed on WDCJ's FM Translator at 102.7 FM (W274BX) in Petersburg. This began on July 9, 2016. These 2 stations are branded as 99.5 and 102.7 The Box.

== Translator ==
In addition to the main station, WCDX is relayed by an FM translator to widen its broadcast area. The translator was launched on November 17, 2015, and is primarily directed at the Petersburg area. The FM Translator is fed from WKJM-HD2.

Broadcast translator for WCDX
| Call sign | Frequency | City of license | FID | ERP (W) | HAAT | Class | FCC info |
|---|---|---|---|---|---|---|---|
| W281AW | 104.1 FM | Petersburg, Virginia | 139555 | 250 | 86 m (282 ft) | D | LMS |
