= 101 Marietta Street =

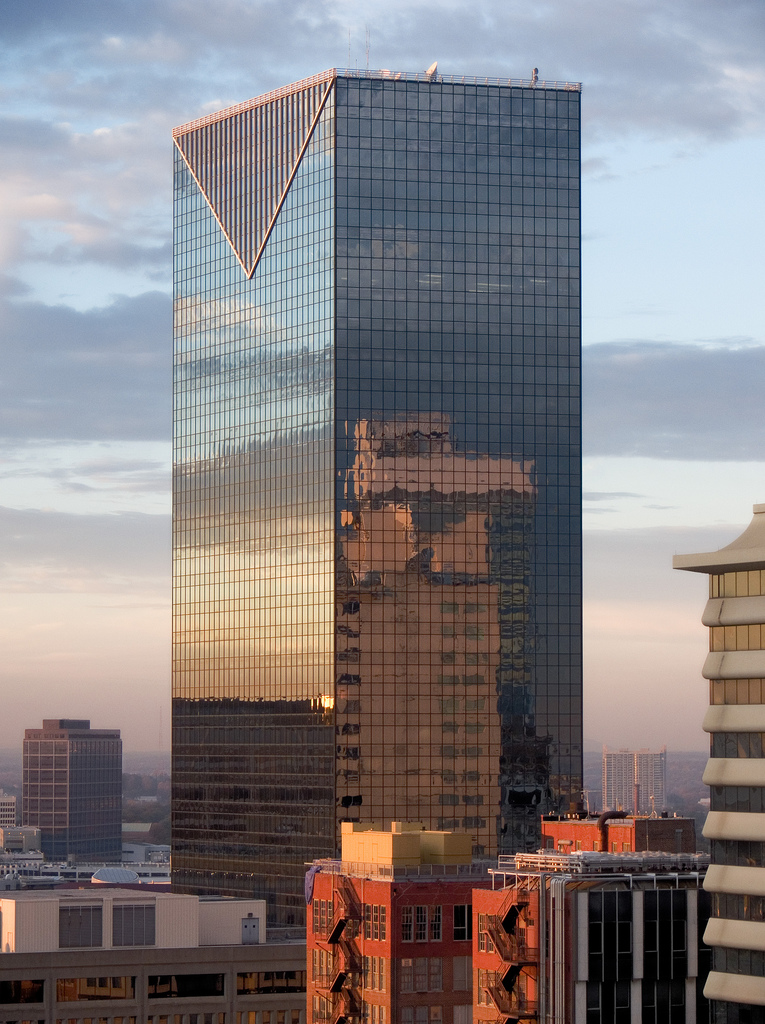
- Former names: Centennial Tower

General information
- Type: Commercial offices
- Architectural style: Modernism
- Location: 101 Marietta Street NW; Atlanta, Georgia
- Coordinates: 33.7568°N 84.3919°W
- Completed: 1975
- Owner: Real Capital Solutions

Height
- Roof: 140 m (460 ft)

Technical details
- Floor count: 36
- Floor area: 674,994 sq ft (62,709.0 m^{2})

Design and construction
- Architects: Cooper Carry & Associates; Neuhaus & Taylor

Website
- www.101marietta.com

101 Marietta Street, formerly Centennial Tower, is a 140 m (460 ft), 36-story skyscraper in downtown Atlanta, Georgia. The building was completed in 1975 and renovated in 1998, resulting in a name change, new facade, and chevrons added to the building which increased its original 136 m (446 ft) height by 4 m (13 ft). The property is considered a class "A" office building consisting of 600,000 square feet.

The U.S. Census Bureau has its Atlanta regional office in Centennial Tower.

== See also ==
- List of tallest buildings in Atlanta
