= Max Media =

American radio broadcast company

- Type: Private
- Industry: Broadcasting
- Founded: 2001
- Headquarters: 5589 Greenwich Rd., Suite 200, Virginia Beach, Virginia, U.S.
- Area served: Illinois, Missouri, and Virginia
- Products: Radio
- Divisions: River Radio LLC
- Website: maxmediallc.com

Max Media is an American media company that owns radio stations throughout the United States and is based in Virginia Beach, Virginia. The company also operates under the name River Radio for stations in their Illinois and Missouri Markets with offices in Cape Girardeau, Missouri, Carterville, Illinois, and Poplar Bluff, Missouri.

River Radio serves as Max Media's midwest division

== History ==
Max Media was founded in 2001. Prior to this, some of the company's management had run the TVX Broadcast Group from 1979 until its sale in 1991 to Paramount Communications (which renamed it the Paramount Stations Group), and had also run Max Media Properties (similarly named to the current company) from then until its sale in 1998 to the Sinclair Broadcast Group (which owned some former TVX stations).

In December 2003, Max Media would gain a handful of radio stations in Southern Illinois and Missouri after the Zimmer Radio Group sold 17 of their stations to Max under the name River Radio for an estimated $43 million.

On September 30, 2013, the Cowles Publishing Company acquired Max Media's Montana television station cluster for $18 million.

On October 31, 2013, Sinclair acquired the non-license assets of WPFO, Waterville, Maine, for $13.6 million; the deal made it a sister station to WGME-TV, Portland, Maine, which already produced a newscast for the station. On November 20, 2013, it was announced that Cunningham Broadcasting was to acquire the license assets for $3.4 million. The sale of the license assets was approved on June 23, 2017.

On August 21, 2013, Max Media announced that it would sell its six Arkansas-based radio stations to Bobby Caldwell's East Arkansas Broadcasters for $3 million. The sale was completed on January 9, 2014.

On August 12, 2015, Max Media announced that it would sell its four Pennsylvania-based radio stations to Kristin Cantrell's Seven Mountains Media LLC for $3.8 million. The sale was completed on November 5, 2015.

On April 5, 2017, Max Media announced that it was selling NBC affiliate WNKY in Bowling Green, Kentucky to Marquee Broadcasting for $5.6 million. The sale was completed on June 30, 2017.

All television stations either directly or indirectly owned by Max Media were sold off by 2019, leaving the company with a portfolio consisting solely of radio stations.

== Current stations ==
=== Radio ===
AM Station	FM Station

City of license / Market	Station	Owned since	Current format
Cape Girardeau, Missouri	KGIR 1220	2004	Sports radio
Cape Girardeau, Missouri	KZIM 960	2004	News/talk
Cape Girardeau, Missouri	KCGQ-FM 99.3	2004	Active rock
Cape Girardeau, Missouri	KEZS-FM 102.9	2004	Country music
Cape Girardeau, Missouri	KGKS 93.9	2004	Adult hits
Marion–Carbondale, IL	WCIL 1120	2004	News/talk
Marion–Carbondale, IL	WJPF 1340	2004	News/talk
Marion–Carbondale, IL	WCIL-FM 101.5	2004	Contemporary hit radio
Marion–Carbondale, IL	WOOZ-FM 99.9	2004	Country music
Marion–Carbondale, IL	WUEZ 95.1	2004	Adult hits
Marion–Carbondale, IL	WXLT 103.5	2004	Sports radio
Norfolk–Virginia Beach–Newport News, VA	WGH 1310	2005	Sports radio
Norfolk–Virginia Beach–Newport News, VA	WGH-FM 97.3	2005	Country music
Norfolk–Virginia Beach–Newport News, VA	WTWV-FM 92.9	2005	Yacht rock
Norfolk–Virginia Beach–Newport News, VA	WVBW-FM 100.5	2005	Urban adult hits
Norfolk–Virginia Beach–Newport News, VA	WVSP-FM 94.1	2005	Sports radio
Poplar Bluff, Missouri	KWOC 930	2004	News/talk
Poplar Bluff, Missouri	KJEZ 95.5	2004	Active rock
Poplar Bluff, Missouri	KKLR-FM 94.5	2004	Country music
Sikeston, Missouri	KMAL 1470	2004	Sports radio
Sikeston, Missouri	KSIM 1400	2004	News/talk
Sikeston, Missouri	KLSC 92.9	2004	Adult hits

== Former stations ==
=== Television ===
City of license / Market	Station	Channel; TV (RF)	Years; owned	Current status
Bowling Green, KY	WNKY	40 (16)	2003–2017	NBC affiliate owned by Marquee Broadcasting
Waterville–Portland, ME	WPFO	23 (23)	2003–2017 (Note: Owned by Corporate Media Consultants Group, a joint venture between Max Media and Power Television International.)	Fox affiliate owned by Cunningham Broadcasting (Note: Operated by Sinclair Broadcast Group.)
Traverse City, MI	WGTU	29 (29)	2003–2008	ABC affiliate owned by Cunningham Broadcasting
Sault Ste. Marie, MI	WGTQ (Note: Satellite of WGTU.)	8 (8)	2003–2008	ABC affiliate owned by Cunningham Broadcasting
Billings, MT	KULR-TV	8 (11)	2004–2013	NBC affiliate owned by Cowles Company
Butte–Bozeman, MT	KWYB	18 (19)	2001–2013	ABC affiliate owned by Cowles Company
Great Falls, MT	KFBB-TV	5 (8)	2004–2013	ABC affiliate owned by Cowles Company
Great Falls, MT	KTGF	16 (45)	2001–2004	MeTV affiliate, KJJC-TV, owned by PetroMedia Corporation
Helena, MT	KHBB-LD (Note: Satellite of KFBB-TV.)	21 (21)	2004–2013	ABC affiliate owned by Cowles Company
Missoula, MT	KTMF	23 (23)	2001–2013	ABC affiliate owned by Cowles Company
Nacogdoches–Tyler–Longview–; Jacksonville, TX	KYTX	19 (18)	2003–2008	CBS affiliate owned by Nexstar Media Group
Christiansted, USVI	WVIF	15 (15)	2003–2009	defunct, went dark in 2009
Arecibo, PR	WMEI	60 (14)	2007–2017	defunct, went dark in 2017
Mayagüez, PR	WOST	14 (20)	2007–2019	ShopHQ affiliate owned by HC2 Holdings
Ponce, PR	WQQZ-CD (Note: Satellite of WOST.)	14 (24)	2005–2019	ShopHQ affiliate owned by HC2 Holdings
Quebradillas, PR	WWKQ-LD	14 (34)	2005–2019	ShopHQ affiliate owned by HC2 Holdings

=== Radio ===
AM Station	FM Station

City of license / Market	Station	Years owned	Current status
Morrilton, AR	KVOM 800	2003–2014	Owned by East Arkansas Broadcasters
Morrilton, AR	KVOM-FM 101.7	2003–2014	Owned by East Arkansas Broadcasters
Russellville–Dardanelle, AR	KCAB 980	2003–2014	Owned by East Arkansas Broadcasters
Russellville–Dardanelle, AR	KCJC 102.3	2003–2014	Owned by East Arkansas Broadcasters
Russellville–Dardanelle, AR	KVLD 99.3	2003–2014	Owned by East Arkansas Broadcasters
Russellville–Dardanelle, AR	KWKK 100.9	2003–2014	Owned by East Arkansas Broadcasters
Denver, CO	KFCO 107.1	2009–2024	Owned by Pillar of Fire International
Denver, CO	KJHM 101.5	2009–2024	Owned by Pillar of Fire International
Ahoskie, NC	WQDK 99.3	2003–2015	Owned by Augusta Radio Fellowship Institute, Inc.
Elizabeth City, NC	WGAI 560	2003–2014	Owned by Gregory Communications License, Inc.
Elizabeth City, NC	WCMS-FM 94.5	2003–2018	Defunct, went silent in 2024
Elizabeth City, NC	WCXL 104.1	2003–2018	Owned by East Carolina Radio
Selinsgrove, PA	WVSL 1240	2003–2013	Defunct, went silent in 2013
Selinsgrove, PA	WFYY 106.5	2003–2015	Owned by Seven Mountains Media LLC
Selinsgrove, PA	WVSL-FM 92.3	2003–2015	Owned by Seven Mountains Media LLC
Selinsgrove, PA	WWBE 98.3	2003–2015	Owned by Seven Mountains Media LLC
Selinsgrove, PA	WYGL-FM 100.5	2003–2015	Owned by Family Life Network
