= KEZS-FM =

- Cape Girardeau, Missouri; United States
- Broadcast area: Southeast Missouri; Southern Illinois; Western Kentucky
- Frequency: 102.9 MHz
- Branding: K103

Programming
- Format: Country
- Affiliations: Compass Media Networks; Westwood One

Ownership
- Owner: Max Media; (River Radio LLC)
- Sister stations: KCGQ-FM, KGIR, KGKS, KZIM

Technical information
- Facility ID: 74580
- Class: C1
- ERP: 100,000 watts
- HAAT: 289 meters (948 ft)
- Transmitter coordinates: 37°24′23″N 89°33′44″W

Links
- Webcast: Listen Live
- Website: k103fm.com

KEZS-FM (102.9 MHz, "K103") is a country music-formatted radio station broadcasting from Cape Girardeau, Missouri, reaching portions of southern Illinois, Southeast Missouri, northeast Arkansas, the Missouri Bootheel, Western Kentucky, and the northern portion of West Tennessee. The station plays songs by country artists such as Thomas Rhett, Kane Brown, and Florida Georgia Line. It is a 100,000-watt station, broadcasting from the KBSI tower near Cape Girardeau.

== Ownership ==
In December 2003, River Radio, acting as Max Media LLC (John Trinder, president and COO), reached an agreement to purchase WCIL, WCIL-FM, WJPF, WOOZ-FM, WUEZ, WXLT, KCGQ-FM, KEZS-FM, KGIR, KGKS, KJEZ, KKLR-FM, KLSC, KMAL, KSIM, KWOC, and KZIM from the Zimmer Radio Group (James L. Zimmer, owner). The reported value of this 17 station transaction was $43 million.
