= WQWQ-LD =

Television station in Cape Girardeau, Missouri

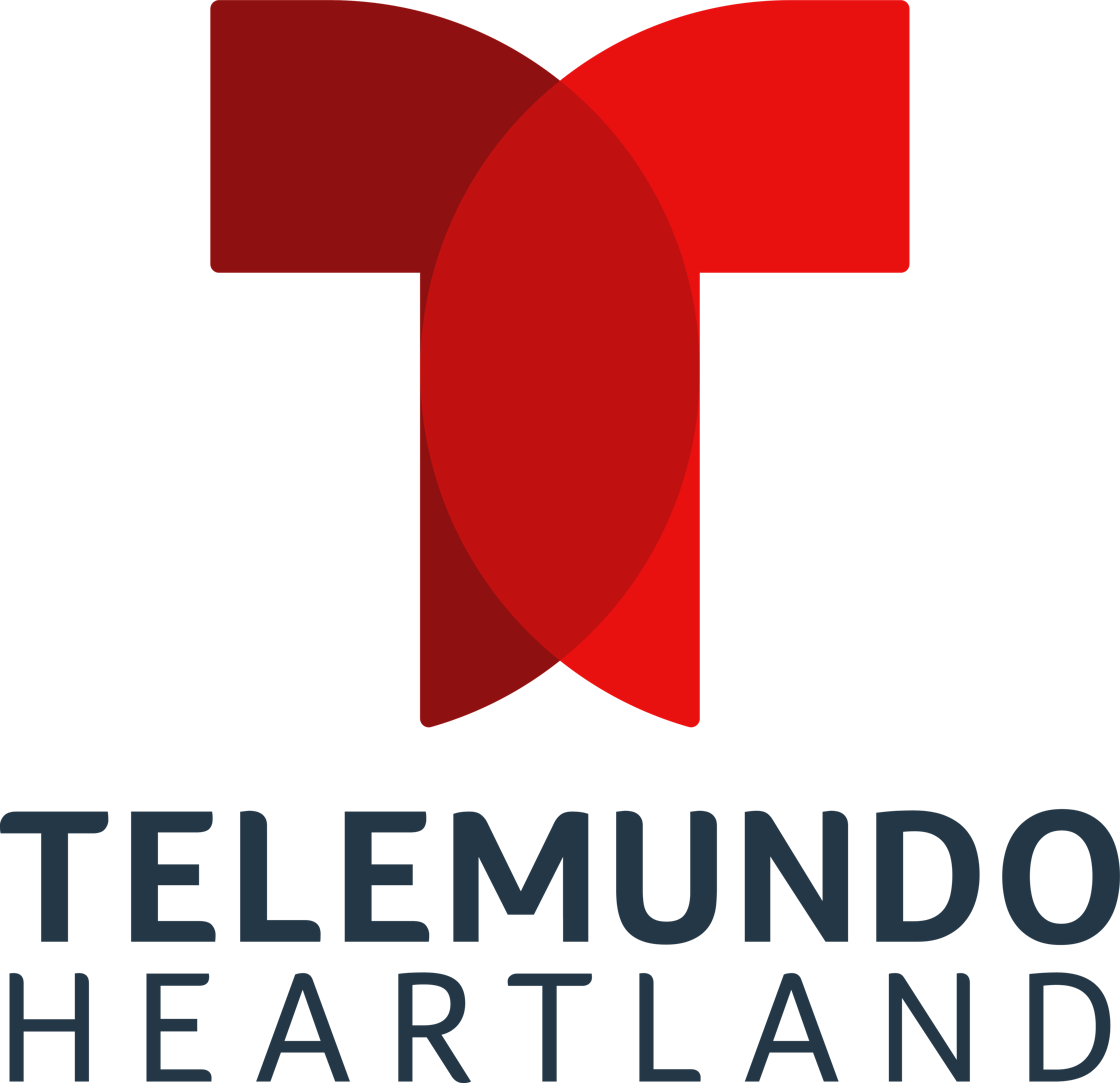
- Cape Girardeau, Missouri; United States
- City: Paducah, Kentucky (nominal city of license)
- Channels: Digital: 18 (UHF); Virtual: 9
- Branding: Telemundo Heartland

Programming
- Affiliations: 9.1: Telemundo; for others, see § Subchannels

Ownership
- Owner: Gray Media; (Gray Television Licensee, LLC)
- Sister stations: KFVS-TV, WSIL-TV

History
- Founded: September 9, 1998
- First air date: February 12, 2001
- Former call signs: W52DC (1999–2000); WQWQ-LP (2000–2021)
- Former channel numbers: Analog: 9 (VHF, 2001–2021)
- Former affiliations: UPN (2001–2006); The CW (primary 2006–2011 and 2019–2021; secondary 2011–2019); MeTV (primary, 2011–2019 and 2021–2023)

Technical information
- Licensing authority: FCC
- Facility ID: 19595
- Class: LD
- ERP: 15 kW
- HAAT: 475.2 m (1,559 ft)
- Transmitter coordinates: 37°25′44.7″N 89°30′14.2″W

Links
- Public license information: LMS
- Website: telemundoheartland.com

Former translator
- WQTV-LP
- Murray, Kentucky
- Channels: Analog: 24 (UHF)

Programming
- Affiliations: Independent (1990–1991); Dark (1991-1995); The WB (1995–2000); UPN (2000–2006); The CW (primary 2006–2011, secondary 2011–2019); MeTV (2011–2019)

History
- Founded: November 22, 1988
- First air date: July 1, 1990
- Last air date: June 24, 2019
- Former call signs: W46BE (1990–1995)
- Former channel numbers: 46 (UHF, 1990–2001)

Technical information
- Facility ID: 31410
- ERP: 9.97 kW
- HAAT: 167 m (548 ft)
- Transmitter coordinates: 36°32′58″N 88°19′52″W

WQWQ-LD (channel 9) is a low-power television station broadcasting from Cape Girardeau, Missouri, United States, as an affiliate of the Spanish-language network Telemundo. It is owned by Gray Media alongside CBS/CW affiliate KFVS-TV (channel 12) and ABC affiliates WSIL-TV (channel 3) and KPOB-TV (channel 15). WQWQ-LD and KFVS-TV share studios in the Hirsch Tower on Broadway Avenue in downtown Cape Girardeau; WQWQ-LD's transmitter is located northwest of Egypt Mills, in unincorporated Cape Girardeau County. Though WQWQ-LD is licensed to serve Paducah, Kentucky, its signal does not cover that city.

WQWQ-LD began as a Paducah-area translator of WQTV-LP (channel 24) in Murray, Kentucky, which broadcast to the Jackson Purchase from 1990 to 2019. The station started as W46BE on channel 46 and was a low-power TV adjunct to a group of local radio stations in Murray. It was off the air beginning in December 1991. In 1995, it affiliated with The WB and was later gifted to Murray State University. Though owned by a public university, Murray State ran WQTV as a commercial enterprise, drawing criticism from Kentucky's commercial broadcasters. During this time, the station also aired a local newscast. In 2000, WQTV lost its WB affiliation to full-power WDKA and in exchange picked up programming from UPN.

Engles Broadcasting started WQWQ-LP in 2001. It served to rebroadcast WQTV into the Paducah area and vastly increased its coverage area. Engles then acquired WQTV-LP before selling the pair to Raycom Media, owner of KFVS-TV, in 2003. A new local newscast produced by KFVS debuted on the station after the sale. WQWQ–WQTV, paired with a digital subchannel of KFVS-TV, became the market's affiliate for The CW when The WB and UPN merged in 2006. Between 2011 and 2019, the station offered MeTV programming outside of CW network hours. WQTV-LP never converted from analog to digital television and was closed in 2019; WQWQ-LP was converted in 2021.

In 2023, Gray moved the transmitter from Paducah to near Cape Girardeau and relaunched the station as a Telemundo affiliate.

== History ==
=== W46BE ===
In May 1990, the Federal Communications Commission (FCC) granted Murray Broadcasting Company a construction permit for a new low-power TV station.

WQTV-LP launched on July 1, 1990, as W46BE and was known on-air as "TV-46". It was designed to be a sister outlet for radio station WNBS (1340 AM), owned by Murray Broadcasting, and was carried on Murray's local cable system. The station aired local news and events as well as content from the FamilyNet, Hit Video USA, and All News Channel services.

In October 1991, WNBS owner Chuck Shuffett sold WNBS and W46BE for $1.2 million to Troy Cory, a Hollywood singer who announced his real name was Keith Stubblefield and that he was a descendant of Nathan Beverly Stubblefield, whose 1892 experiments with "wireless telephony" predated Guglielmo Marconi's invention of radio. Major changes followed. The evening newscast was eliminated, and during the day, the TV station (referred to as "WNBS-TV") began simulcasting the audio of WNBS radio with a camera in the studio and cartoons and other vignettes playing during songs. Cory brought significant labor strife to WNBS; the station's employees resigned after Cory insisted they sign contracts to become independent contractors instead of employees. For two weeks, operations manager Anthony Parham kept the stations on the air through December 6, when WNBS left the air and channel 46 began broadcasting a test pattern. The stations were put in receivership in early 1992; Cory sued Shuffett, claiming he had been misled about the company's debts, while Cory was arrested on felony theft charges that were only dropped with a plan to repay the employees for lost wages. Equipment used by the TV station was sold to the Calloway County, Kentucky, school system for use in Calloway County High School's TV production class. Shuffett successfully sued Stubblefield for breach of contract.

=== WQTV-LP ===
Sam Parker, who already owned Murray radio stations WSJP (1130 AM) and WBLN-FM (103.7), purchased WNBS in 1995; he reactivated channel 46 as WQTV-LP on September 3, 1995. The station, known as the "Quad Cities Television Network" (for Murray, Mayfield, Benton, and Paris, Tennessee), operated from studios on Duiguid Drive near the radio stations. It aired programming from The WB and also began producing two local newscasts a day. In addition, WQTV held the rights to Murray State University (MSU) athletic events. Parker retired from broadcasting in November 1996 and announced the sale of the Murray stations to WRUS Inc. of Russellville. During this time, Murray State returned its coaches' shows to Paducah's WPSD-TV in order to reach a wider audience. In addition, the local newscast was eliminated after two years for economic reasons, with the last airing on August 27, 1997.

In October 1997, WRUS Inc. offered WQTV as a gift to Murray State University. Murray State accepted the gift but faced criticism from the Kentucky Broadcasters Association, which represented commercial radio and TV stations, because it did not entirely foreclose the possibility of running WQTV-LP on a partly or fully commercial basis. The donation was formally accepted by MSU's board of trustees in February 1998. The station continued to accept advertising, and even though it had no full-time professional salesperson on staff, Kentucky commercial broadcasters continued to be concerned that state-subsidized Murray State had an unfair advantage as a licensee. By this time, the station used the America One network outside of WB programming.

In 1997, a new full-power station signed on the air in Paducah: WDKA (channel 49). This station was an affiliate of UPN but began airing WB shows on a delayed basis the next year. On April 1, 2000, WDKA became an exclusive WB affiliate, and WQTV took on UPN programming.

=== WQWQ-LP ===
WQWQ-LP began broadcasting on February 12, 2001. It was owned by Engles Communications of Santa Barbara, California, and primarily served to rebroadcast WQTV-LP, which remained owned by Murray State; the combined service was known as "UPN 9/24", with WQTV-LP having recently moved from channel 46 to channel 24. Owner Steve Engles was familiar with the market; he had owned KBSI-TV from 1989 to 1995. The launch of the new Paducah station provided a renewed opportunity for the Kentucky Broadcasters Association to criticize Murray State for selling advertising on WQTV.

In 2002, Engles bought WQTV-LP from Murray State, then Raycom Media, owner of KFVS-TV in Cape Girardeau, Missouri, bought both stations from Engles. Raycom's first priority was to improve the signal quality from the transmitters. The UPN feed and other programming were now received in Cape Girardeau and sent to the analog transmitters in Paducah and Murray, as well as local cable companies, as a digital subchannel of KFVS-TV. In addition, KFVS-TV began producing a 9 p.m. local newscast for WQTV–WQWQ, which was anchored from the station's new Paducah news bureau.

The WB and UPN merged to form The CW in 2006; WDKA quickly signed with competitor MyNetworkTV, leaving WQWQ–WQTV with The CW affiliation. The station branded as "Heartland's CW". Simultaneously, production of the 9 p.m. newscast moved to Cape Girardeau, and it was relaunched as a local news program focusing on Southeast Missouri; Heartland News at 9 was discontinued on July 29, 2007.

Beginning in 2011, WQWQ–WQTV began airing programming from MeTV outside of The CW, news rebroadcasts, and other programs. This ended on January 1, 2020, when KFVS moved MeTV to a dedicated 12.4 subchannel. The CW service was then rebranded KFVS Too in 2021, in acknowledgement of its broadcast as subchannel 12.2.

WQWQ-LP and WQTV-LP were both obligated to convert to digital by July 13, 2021, as part of the Digital TV transition for low-powered TV stations. In early 2015, a construction permit was issued for both WQTV-LP and WQWQ-LP to convert to digital. WQTV-LP went off the air in 2019, and Gray Television surrendered its license for cancellation on February 10, 2021. On June 22, 2021, WQWQ-LP was licensed for digital operation and changed its call sign to WQWQ-LD.

=== Telemundo affiliation ===
In 2023, WQWQ relocated its transmission facility to its current location at KFVS's tower in Cape Girardeau. That same year, the station became affiliated with Telemundo, becoming the market's first Spanish-language television station.

== Subchannels ==
Subchannels of WQWQ-LD
Subchannel	Res.	Short name	Programming
9.1	1080i	TELEMDO	Telemundo
9.2	480i		Matrix Midwest
9.3	480i	DEFY	Defy
9.4	480i	MeToons	MeTV Toons
