= WCIL (AM) =

Simulcast of WJPF
- Carbondale, Illinois; United States
- Broadcast area: Marion–Carbondale, Illinois
- Frequency: 1020 kHz
- Branding: NewsRadio WJPF

Programming
- Language: English
- Format: News/talk
- Affiliations: Premiere Networks; Westwood One; Fox News Radio; Saluki Radio Network

Ownership
- Owner: Max Media; (River Radio LLC)
- Sister stations: WCIL-FM, WJPF, WOOZ-FM, WUEZ, WXLT

History
- First air date: 1946; 80 years ago
- Call sign meaning: Carbondale, Illinois

Technical information
- Licensing authority: FCC
- Facility ID: 65950
- Class: D
- Power: 1,000 watts day only
- Transmitter coordinates: 37°43′31.00″N 89°15′25.00″W
- Translator: W300DY 107.9 MHz (Carbondale)

Links
- Public license information: Public file; LMS
- Website: www.wjpf.com

WCIL (1020 A.M.) is a radio station broadcasting a news talk format as a simulcast of WJPF. Licensed to Carbondale, Illinois, United States, the station serves the Marion-Carbondale area. The station is owned by Max Media.

== History ==
WCIL (AM) signed on the air in 1946 as a daytime-only station with personalities such as Jim Bowen, Bluegrass Roy and others in a second floor studio at about 215 W. Main St. in Carbondale . At that time, to get the AM license, they were pressured by the FCC to also sign on an FM station. They kept the FM on the air for about a year and then signed it off the air since, at the time, nobody listened to FM. Later, WCIL moved the studios to a house at a location that is now the parking lot for the First United Methodist Church in Carbondale. In 1964 WCIL moved again, this time to new studios at 211 W. Main in Carbondale, right across the street from the church. Paul F. McRoy, the station's owner, foresaw the potential of FM and reapplied for an FM license. The license was approved and WCIL-FM signed on in 1968 and allowed broadcasting after local sunset when WCIL was required to sign off. WCIL simulcast programming during this time . The format was easy listening music and news. A year or so before CIL-FM was born, Top 40 music was played after 10p.m.. The FCC required AM/FM simulcasts to split programming. So, plans were made to split WCIL AM and FM. The AM and FM split programming and became separate stations on August 16, 1976. McRoy would go on to sell WCIL-AM-FM to Dennis Lyle, now the President of the Illinois Broadcasters Association.

Later, in 1997, Lyle sold the stations to the Zimmer Radio Group. Soon after the sale, WCIL became a daytime-only simulcast of news/talk station WJPF.

In 2004, Zimmer Radio Group sold their stations in southern Illinois (including WCIL), along with Cape Girardeau, Poplar Bluff and Sikeston, Missouri to River Radio, a subsidiary of Max Media, LLC.

== Programming ==
WCIL is a daytime-only station simulcasting WJPF/1340-Herrin, Illinois. It features programming from Premiere Networks and Westwood One. The station also broadcasts high school athletics with WJPF broadcasting Carterville Lions games and the WCIL simulcast broadcasting Carbondale Terriers games. They also dip into the collegiate level with broadcasts of Southern Illinois Salukis women's basketball games.

== F.M. translator ==
Broadcast translator for WCIL
Call sign	Frequency	City of license	FID	ERP (W)	HAAT	Class	Transmitter coordinates	FCC info
W300DY	107.9 FM	Carbondale, Illinois	202207	250	0 m (0 ft)	D	37°43′30.8″N 89°15′24.7″W	LMS

== Ownership ==
In December 2003, Mississippi River Radio, acting as Max Media LLC (John Trinder, president/COO), reached an agreement to purchase WCIL, WCIL-FM, WJPF, WOOZ-FM, WUEZ, WXLT, KCGQ-FM, KEZS-FM, KGIR, KGKS, KJEZ, KKLR-FM, KLSC, KMAL, KSIM, KWOC, and KZIM from the Zimmer Radio Group (James L. Zimmer, owner). The reported value of this 17 station transaction was $43 million.
