= KSIM =

- Sikeston, Missouri; United States
- Frequency: 1400 kHz
- Branding: News Radio 1400

Programming
- Format: News/talk
- Affiliations: Fox News Radio; Compass Media Networks; Premiere Networks; Salem Radio Network; Westwood One

Ownership
- Owner: Max Media; (River Radio LLC)
- Sister stations: KLSC, KMAL

History
- First air date: 1948
- Call sign meaning: Sikeston, Missouri

Technical information
- Licensing authority: FCC
- Facility ID: 35605
- Class: C
- Power: 1,000 watts (unlimited)
- Transmitter coordinates: 36°52′12″N 89°36′32″W
- Translator: 101.7 K269GZ (Sikeston)

Links
- Public license information: Public file; LMS
- Webcast: Listen Live
- Website: kzimksim.com

KSIM (1400 AM) is a radio station licensed to serve Sikeston, Missouri, United States. The station is owned by Max Media and licensed to River Radio LLC. It airs a news/talk format. KSIM shares significant programming with sister station KZIM.

== History ==
KSIM went on the air in 1948 and was owned by the Sikeston Community Broadcasting Company. It broadcast with 250 watts until beginning broadcast at 1,000 watts during the day in 1962. KSIM was able to get on the air because of KFVS—the future KZIM—moving to 960 kHz. Prime Time Broadcasting Corporation bought KSIM in 1977. It was sold to KSIM, Inc., in 1993, and to the Zimmer Radio Group in 1996.

In December 2003, River Radio, acting as Max Media LLC (John Trinder, president/COO), reached an agreement to purchase WCIL, WCIL-FM, WUEZ, WXLT, WOOZ-FM, WJPF, KGIR, KZIM, KEZS-FM, KCGQ-FM, KMAL, KLSC, KWOC, KJEZ, KKLR-FM, KGKS, and KSIM from the Zimmer Radio Group (James L. Zimmer, owner). The reported value of this 17-station transaction was $43 million.

Former logo
