= WUEZ =

Radio station in Carterville, Illinois

- Carterville, Illinois; United States
- Broadcast area: Marion-Carbondale (IL) area
- Frequency: 95.1 MHz
- Branding: 95.1 Steve FM

Programming
- Format: Adult hits
- Affiliations: Premiere Networks, Saluki Radio Network

Ownership
- Owner: Max Media; (River Radio LLC)
- Sister stations: WCIL, WCIL-FM, WJPF, WOOZ-FM, WXLT

History
- First air date: February 22, 1991
- Former call signs: WYGF (1991–1991); WEZS (1991–1993); WXLT (1993–2001)
- Call sign meaning: Call sign originally used at 95.1 MHz, an easy listening station

Technical information
- Licensing authority: FCC
- Facility ID: 39520
- Class: B1
- ERP: 17,600 watts
- HAAT: 119 meters
- Transmitter coordinates: 37°43′31.00″N 89°15′25.00″W

Links
- Public license information: Public file; LMS
- Webcast: Listen Live
- Website: 951stevefm.com

WUEZ (95.1 FM, "95.1 Steve FM") is a radio station broadcasting an adult hits format. Licensed to Carterville, Illinois, United States, the station serves the Marion-Carbondale (IL) area. The station is currently owned by Max Media and licensed to River Radio LLC.

== History ==
The station was assigned the call sign WYGF on 1991-02-22. On 1991-12-27, the station changed its call sign to WEZS, on 1993-09-10 to WXLT, and on 2001-03-19 to the current WUEZ in a call sign swap with the current-day WXLT. With it came the old WUEZ's "Magic" branding.

On March 20, 2015, WUEZ changed its format from adult contemporary to classic hits, retaining the "Magic 95.1" branding.

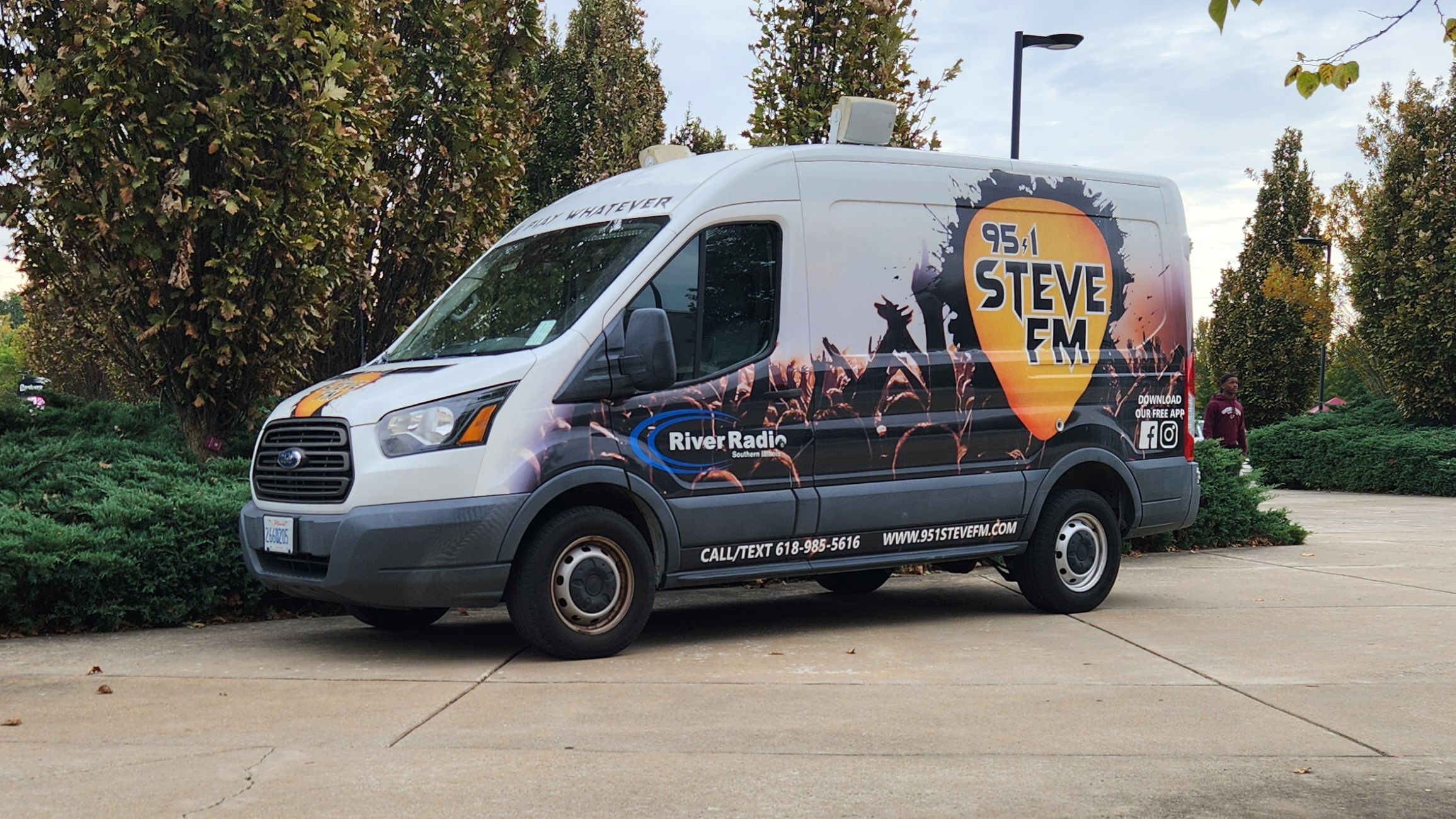
A promotional vehicle used by WUEZ

On January 4, 2023, WUEZ changed its format from classic hits to adult hits, branded as "95.1 Steve FM".

== Ownership ==
In December 2003, River Radio, acting as Max Media LLC (John Trinder, president/COO), reached an agreement to purchase WCIL, WCIL-FM, WJPF, WOOZ-FM, WUEZ, WXLT, KCGQ-FM, KEZS-FM, KGIR, KGKS, KJEZ, KKLR-FM, KLSC, KMAL, KSIM, KWOC, and KZIM from the Zimmer Radio Group (James L. Zimmer, owner). The reported value of this 17 station transaction was $43 million.

== Previous logo ==
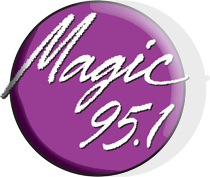
