= KZIM =

- Cape Girardeau, Missouri; United States
- Broadcast area: Cape Girardeau, Missouri
- Frequency: 960 kHz
- Branding: News Radio 960

Programming
- Format: News/talk
- Affiliations: Fox News Radio; Compass Media Networks; Premiere Networks; Salem Radio Network; Westwood One

Ownership
- Owner: Max Media; (River Radio LLC)
- Sister stations: KCGQ-FM, KEZS-FM, KGIR, KGKS

History
- First air date: 1925
- Former call signs: KFVS (1925–1979); KGIR (1979–1985)
- Former frequencies: 1340 kHz, 1210 kHz (shared time), 1370 kHz, 1400 kHz
- Call sign meaning: Zimmer (former owners)

Technical information
- Licensing authority: FCC
- Facility ID: 74582
- Class: B
- Power: 5,000 watts day; 500 watts night
- Transmitter coordinates: 37°18′59″N 89°29′06″W

Links
- Public license information: Public file; LMS
- Webcast: Listen Live
- Website: kzimksim.com

KZIM (960 AM) is a radio station licensed to serve Cape Girardeau, Missouri, United States. The station is owned by Max Media and licensed to River Radio LLC. It airs a news and talk format.

KZIM features radio programming such as the syndicated Coast to Coast AM, The Sean Hannity Show, and The Mark Levin Show.

== History ==
KZIM was the region's first radio station. Oscar Hirsch put KFVS 1340 on air in 1925, running it out of his radio shop, the Hirsch Battery and Radio Company. Although the KFVS call letters appear to stand for "Five States" for the station's region, they were randomly assigned by then-Secretary of Commerce Herbert Hoover, predating the establishment of the broader region under that name. In 1928, it moved to 1210 kHz and began sharing the frequency with another station, WEBQ in Harrisburg, Illinois, which also was moved from 1340. KFVS operated with 250 watts during the day and 100 watts at night, later moving to full-time 250-watt operation. For special occasions, such as political events, Easter church ceremonies and football games, KFVS received permission to operate simultaneously with WEBQ.

In the late 1930s, KFVS sought to go full-time on 1210 if WEBQ was moved to 1310; this was denied. In 1940, KFVS finally broke out of the time share with WEBQ and moved to 1370 kHz. It was not there long before NARBA reallocation resulted in yet another frequency change, to 1400 kHz. In 1947, KFVS moved one last time to its present frequency of 960 kHz, accompanied by a power increase to 1,000 watts during the day and 500 watts at night. This move enabled the 1400 frequency to be reused for a new station in Sikeston, future sister station KSIM. Hirsch held a minority stake in KSIM until 1961, when he divested it as a condition of KFVS going to 5,000-watt operation on 960. KFVS also expanded to television when KFVS-TV went on the air in 1954.

The KFVS callsign was retired from radio on June 1, 1979, when the station became KGIR as a result of Hirsch selling the television station. Six years later, the Hirsch family sold the station to the Zimmer family, earning a handsome return on Oscar Hirsch's investment of 60 years earlier. The Zimmers gave the station its current calls, KZIM.

In December 2003, River Radio, acting as Max Media LLC (John Trinder, president/COO), reached an agreement to purchase WCIL, WCIL-FM, WUEZ, WXLT, WOOZ-FM, WJPF, KGIR, KZIM, KEZS-FM, KCGQ-FM, KMAL, KLSC, KWOC, KJEZ, KKLR-FM, KGKS, and KSIM from the Zimmer Radio Group (James L. Zimmer, owner). The reported value of this 17-station transaction was $43 million.

Former logo
