= KCGQ-FM =

- Gordonville, Missouri; United States
- Broadcast area: Cape Girardeau, Missouri
- Frequency: 99.3 MHz
- Branding: 99X

Programming
- Format: Active rock
- Affiliations: ABC Radio, Premiere Radio Networks

Ownership
- Owner: Max Media; (River Radio LLC)
- Sister stations: KEZS-FM, KGIR, KGKS, KZIM

History
- First air date: 1978 (as KJAQ-FM)
- Former call signs: KJAQ-FM (1978–1989); KTXI (1989–1992); KCGQ (1992–1992)

Technical information
- Licensing authority: FCC
- Facility ID: 64621
- Class: A
- ERP: 5,000 watts
- HAAT: 109 meters (358 ft)
- Transmitter coordinates: 37°21′34″N 89°37′16″W

Links
- Public license information: Public file; LMS
- Webcast: Listen Live
- Website: 99xfm.com

KCGQ-FM (99.3 FM) is a radio station broadcasting an active rock format. Licensed to Gordonville, Missouri, United States, the station is currently owned by Max Media and licensed to River Radio LLC and features programming from ABC Radio and Premiere Radio Networks.

== History ==
The station was started in 1978 by Rainbow Broadcasting, owners of KJAS 1170 located in Jackson, Missouri. The original Call sign was KJAQ-FM, "Q99". The station was sold to Al Sikes in the early 1980s. Target Media, owned by Tom Stine and Mark Rollings, purchased the stations in 1986 and moved the station from a 3-bedroom house in Gordonville to new studios in Cape Girardeau. Target Media sold KJAS AM 1170 in 1988. Target Media then sold Q99 to Zimmer Broadcasting in 1997. Zimmer sold the station—along with all of its other southeast Missouri (Cape Girardeau, Sikeston, and Poplar Bluff), and southern Illinois (Marion and Carbondale) properties (17 stations: WCIL, WCIL-FM, WJPF, WOOZ-FM, WUEZ, WXLT, KCGQ-FM, KEZS-FM, KGIR, KGKS, KJEZ, KKLR-FM, KLSC, KMAL, KSIM, KWOC, and KZIM) -- to Max Media, LLC. The sales occurred in December 2003, for a reported price of $43 million.

On October 9, 2026, KCGQ-FM rebranded as "99X".
