= KCON (disambiguation) =

KCON is an annual K-pop convention.

KCON may also refer to:

- The ICAO code of Concord Municipal Airport, New Hampshire, United States
- KCON (FM), a radio station (92.7 FM) licensed to serve Vilonia, Arkansas, United States
- KASR, a radio station (99.3 FM) licensed to Atkins, Arkansas, which held the call sign KCON from 2015 to 2021
- KCON (AM), a defunct radio station (1230 AM) licensed to Conway, Arkansas, which broadcast from 1950 to 2007
