= WCIL =

WCIL can refer to:

- WCIL (AM), a radio station at 1020 AM located in Carbondale, Illinois
- WCIL-FM, a radio station at 101.5 FM located in Carbondale, Illinois
