= KGIR =

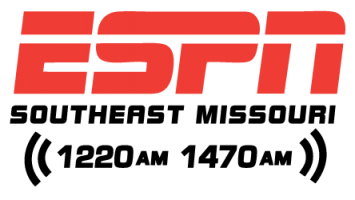
- Cape Girardeau, Missouri; United States
- Frequency: 1220 kHz
- Branding: ESPN 1220/1470

Programming
- Format: Sports
- Affiliations: ESPN Radio

Ownership
- Owner: Max Media; (River Radio LLC)
- Sister stations: KMAL, KCGQ-FM, KEZS-FM, KGKS, KLSC, KZIM

History
- First air date: June 10, 1966 (as KZYM)
- Former call signs: KZYM (1966–1985); KZIM (1985–1985); KGIR (1985–1992); KCGQ (1992–1996)
- Call sign meaning: Cape GIRardeau

Technical information
- Licensing authority: FCC
- Facility ID: 64622
- Class: D
- Power: 250 watts (day); 137 watts (night)
- Transmitter coordinates: 37°18′0.2″N 89°29′24.3″W
- Translator: 93.5 K228FX (Cape Girardeau)

Links
- Public license information: Public file; LMS
- Webcast: Listen Live
- Website: semoespn.com

KGIR (1220 AM, "ESPN 1220/1470") is a radio station licensed to serve Cape Girardeau, Missouri, United States. The station is owned by Max Media and licensed to River Radio LLC. It airs a sports format in conjunction with KMAL and featuring programming from ESPN Radio.

The station was assigned the KGIR call letters by the Federal Communications Commission on March 29, 1996.

KGIR has an FCC construction permit for a new FM translator in Cape Girardeau, Missouri; it will broadcast on the frequency of 93.5 MHz with the call letters K228FX.

== Ownership ==
In December 2003, River Radio, acting as Max Media LLC (John Trinder, president/COO), reached an agreement to purchase WCIL, WCIL-FM, WJPF, WOOZ-FM, WUEZ, WXLT, KCGQ-FM, KEZS-FM, KGIR, KGKS, KJEZ, KKLR-FM, KLSC, KMAL, KSIM, KWOC, and KZIM from the Zimmer Radio Group (James L. Zimmer, owner). The reported value of this 17 station transaction was $43 million.

== History ==
In the 1930s, the call letters KGIR belonged to a station in Butte, Montana, broadcasting on 1360 kHz with 500 watts of power.
