= KVOM =

KVOM may refer to:

- KVOM (AM), a radio station (800 AM) licensed to Morrilton, Arkansas, United States
- KVOM-FM, a radio station (101.7 FM) licensed to Morrilton, Arkansas, United States
