= WJPF =

- Herrin, Illinois; United States
- Broadcast area: Marion-Carbondale (IL) area
- Frequency: 1340 kHz
- Branding: NewsRadio WJPF

Programming
- Format: Talk radio
- Affiliations: Premiere Networks; Westwood One; Fox News Radio; Saluki Radio Network

Ownership
- Owner: Max Media; (River Radio LLC)
- Sister stations: WCIL, WCIL-FM, WUEZ, WOOZ-FM, WXLT

Technical information
- Licensing authority: FCC
- Facility ID: 19058
- Class: C
- Power: 770 watts (unlimited)
- Transmitter coordinates: 37°50′4″N 89°1′40″W
- Translator: 99.5 W258DP (Herrin)
- Repeater: 1020 WCIL (Carbondale)

Links
- Public license information: Public file; LMS
- Website: wjpf.com

WJPF (1340 AM) is a radio station broadcasting a talk radio format. Licensed to Herrin, Illinois, United States, the station serves the Marion-Carbondale area. The station is currently owned by Max Media, licensed to River Radio LLC, and features programming from Premiere Networks and Westwood One. The station also broadcasts high school athletics with WJPF broadcasting Carterville Lions games and the WCIL simulcast broadcasting Carbondale Terriers games. They also dip into the collegiate level with broadcasts of Southern Illinois Salukis women's basketball games.

== Ownership ==
In December 2003, River Radio, acting as Max Media LLC (John Trinder, president/COO), reached an agreement to purchase WCIL, WCIL-FM, WJPF, WOOZ-FM, WUEZ, WXLT, KCGQ-FM, KEZS-FM, KGIR, KGKS, KJEZ, KKLR-FM, KLSC, KMAL, KSIM, KWOC, and KZIM from the Zimmer Radio Group (James L. Zimmer, owner). The reported value of this 17 station transaction was $43 million.

== FM translator ==
Broadcast translator for WJPF
Call sign	Frequency	City of license	FID	ERP (W)	HAAT	Class	Transmitter coordinates	FCC info
W258DP	99.5 FM	Herrin, Illinois	202334	250	0 m (0 ft)	D	37°50′4.2″N 89°1′40.3″W	LMS
