= KLSC =

Variety Hits radio station in Malden, Missouri

- Malden, Missouri; United States
- Broadcast area: Sikeston, Missouri
- Frequency: 92.9 MHz
- Branding: Shuffle 92.9

Programming
- Format: Variety Hits

Ownership
- Owner: Max Media; (River Radio LLC)
- Sister stations: KMAL, KSIM, KGIR

History
- First air date: September 17, 1999 (as KMAL-FM)
- Former call signs: KMAL-FM (9/1999-12/1999)

Technical information
- Licensing authority: FCC
- Facility ID: 4154
- Class: C2
- ERP: 50,000 watts
- HAAT: 145 meters (476 ft)
- Transmitter coordinates: 36°40′31″N 89°46′19″W

Links
- Public license information: Public file; LMS
- Webcast: https://radio.securenetsystems.net/cwa/index.cfm?stationCallSign=KLSC
- Website: shuffle929.com

KLSC (92.9 FM) is a radio station broadcasting a Variety Hits format. Licensed to Malden, Missouri, United States, the station is currently owned by Max Media and licensed to River Radio LLC.

== History ==
The station was assigned the call letters KMAL-FM on September 17, 1999. On December 10, 1999, the station changed its call sign to the current KLSC.

On June 1, 2018, KLSC changed their format from ESPN sports to contemporary hit radio, branded as "Hot 92.9".

On January 5, 2024, KLSC changed formats from CHR as "Hot 92.9" to variety hits as "Shuffle 92.9", playing a variety of songs from the '70's through the early 2000's.

== Ownership ==
In December 2003, River Radio, acting as Max Media LLC (John Trinder, president/COO), reached an agreement to purchase WCIL, WCIL-FM, WJPF, WOOZ-FM, WUEZ, WXLT, KCGQ-FM, KEZS-FM, KGIR, KGKS, KJEZ, KKLR-FM, KLSC, KMAL, KSIM, KWOC, and KZIM from the Zimmer Radio Group (James L. Zimmer, owner). The reported value of this 17 station transaction was $43 million.

== Previous logo ==
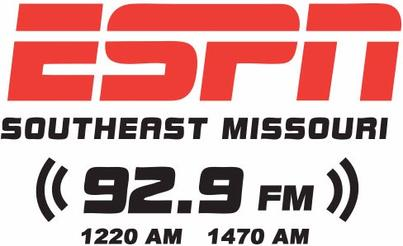
