= WXLT =

- Christopher, Illinois; United States
- Broadcast area: Marion, Illinois
- Frequency: 103.5 MHz
- Branding: 103.5 ESPN Southern Illinois

Programming
- Format: Sports
- Affiliations: ESPN Radio

Ownership
- Owner: Max Media; (MRR License LLC)
- Sister stations: WCIL, WCIL-FM, WUEZ, WJPF, WOOZ-FM

History
- First air date: December 25, 1990
- Former call signs: WUEZ (1990–2001)

Technical information
- Licensing authority: FCC
- Facility ID: 6647
- Class: A
- ERP: 6,000 watts
- HAAT: 100 meters (330 feet)
- Transmitter coordinates: 37°55′55″N 88°57′31″W

Links
- Public license information: Public file; LMS
- Webcast: Listen live
- Website: www.riverradiosportscentral.com

WXLT (103.5 FM, "ESPN Southern Illinois") is a radio station licensed to serve Christopher, Illinois, United States. The station is owned by Max Media and airs a sports format.

== History ==
WXLT was first assigned the call sign WUEZ on October 30, 1990, and began broadcasting on December 25, 1990, with an easy listening format and studios in Herrin. under the branding of Magic 103.5. The station was assigned the WXLT call letters by the Federal Communications Commission on March 19, 2001, and most recently broadcast an adult hits format as "Jack FM". On February 2, 2009, WXLT switched formats to sports as "ESPN Southern Illinois". 103.5 ESPN is the radio home for Herrin Tiger football and basketball. The voice of the Tigers is Mike Murphy, and the color commentator during football season is Kenny Steelman, and during basketball season it is Jason Karnes.

== Ownership ==
In December 2003, River Radio, acting as Max Media LLC (John Trinder, president/COO), reached an agreement to purchase WCIL, WCIL-FM, WUEZ, WXLT, WOOZ-FM, WJPF, KGIR, KZIM, KEZS-FM, KCGQ-FM, KMAL, KLSC, KWOC, KJEZ, KKLR-FM, KGKS, and KSIM from the Zimmer Radio Group (James L. Zimmer, owner). The reported value of this 17-station transaction was $43 million.
