= KMAL =

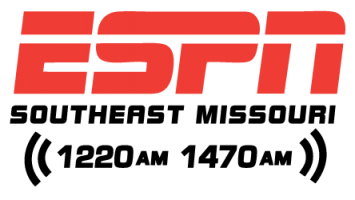
- Malden, Missouri; United States
- Broadcast area: Sikeston, Missouri
- Frequency: 1470 kHz
- Branding: ESPN 1220 AM 1470 AM

Programming
- Format: Sports
- Affiliations: ESPN Radio

Ownership
- Owner: Max Media; (River Radio LLC)
- Sister stations: KGIR, KLSC, KSIM

History
- First air date: September 15, 1954 (as KTCB)
- Former call signs: KTCB (1954–1999)
- Call sign meaning: MALden

Technical information
- Licensing authority: FCC
- Facility ID: 4153
- Class: D
- Power: 1,000 watts (day only)
- Transmitter coordinates: 36°33′08″N 89°58′42″W

Links
- Public license information: Public file; LMS
- Webcast: Listen Live
- Website: www.semoespn.com

KMAL (1470 AM, "ESPN 1220/1470") is a radio station licensed to serve Malden, Missouri, United States. The station is owned by Max Media and licensed to River Radio LLC. It airs a sports format in conjunction with KGIR and featuring programming from ESPN Radio.

The station was assigned the KMAL call letters by the Federal Communications Commission on September 17, 1999.

== Ownership ==
In December 2003, River Radio, acting as Max Media LLC (John Trinder, president/COO), reached an agreement to purchase WCIL, WCIL-FM, WJPF, WOOZ-FM, WUEZ, WXLT, KCGQ-FM, KEZS-FM, KGIR, KGKS, KJEZ, KKLR-FM, KLSC, KMAL, KSIM, KWOC, and KZIM from the Zimmer Radio Group (James L. Zimmer, owner). The reported value of this 17 station transaction was $43 million.

== Previous Logo ==
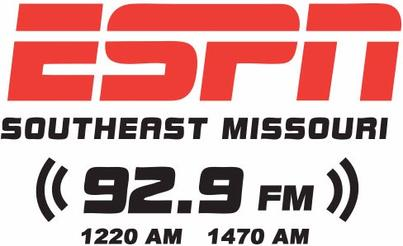
(KMAL's logo under previous simulcast with KLSC 92.9 FM)
