= KPOB =

KPOB may refer to:

- KPOB-TV, a television station (channel 15) licensed to Poplar Bluff, Missouri, United States
- the ICAO code for Pope Air Force Base
