= KFVS-TV =

Television station in Cape Girardeau, Missouri

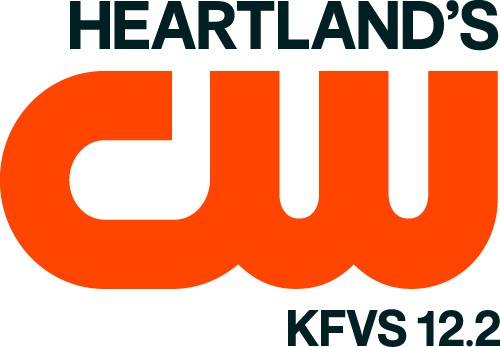
- Cape Girardeau, Missouri; Harrisburg, Illinois; Paducah, Kentucky; United States
- City: Cape Girardeau, Missouri
- Channels: Digital: 11 (VHF); Virtual: 12
- Branding: KFVS 12; Heartland News; Heartland's CW (12.2)

Programming
- Affiliations: 12.1: CBS; 12.2: The CW; for others, see § Subchannels

Ownership
- Owner: Gray Media; (Gray Television Licensee, LLC)
- Sister stations: WQWQ-LD, WSIL-TV

History
- First air date: October 3, 1954
- Former channel numbers: Analog: 12 (VHF, 1954–2009); Digital: 57 (UHF, 2002–2009), 12 (VHF, 2009–2020)
- Call sign meaning: from former radio sister KFVS (AM)

Technical information
- Licensing authority: FCC
- Facility ID: 592
- ERP: 11.8 kW
- HAAT: 609 m (1,998 ft)
- Transmitter coordinates: 37°25′46″N 89°30′14″W
- Translator(s): K17LV-D 17 (UHF) Poplar Bluff, MO

Links
- Public license information: Public file; LMS
- Website: www.heartlandnews.com

KFVS-TV (channel 12) is a television station licensed to Cape Girardeau, Missouri, United States, serving Southeastern Missouri, the Purchase area of Western Kentucky, Southern Illinois, and Northwest Tennessee as an affiliate of CBS and The CW. The station is owned by Gray Media alongside ABC affiliates WSIL-TV (channel 3) and KPOB-TV (channel 15), and Telemundo affiliate WQWQ-LD (channel 9). KFVS-TV and WQWQ-LD share studios in the Hirsch Tower on Broadway Avenue in Downtown Cape Girardeau; KFVS-TV's transmitter is located northwest of Egypt Mills, in unincorporated Cape Girardeau County. WSIL/KPOB continue to be based out of their Carterville, Illinois, facility to cover news in Southern Illinois.

KFVS-TV had previously served the Jonesboro, Arkansas, media market as the default CBS station on cable, until the sign-on of the Jonesboro area's first locally based CBS affiliate August 1, 2015, on a second digital subchannel of Fox affiliate KJNB-LD/KJNE-LD.

== History ==
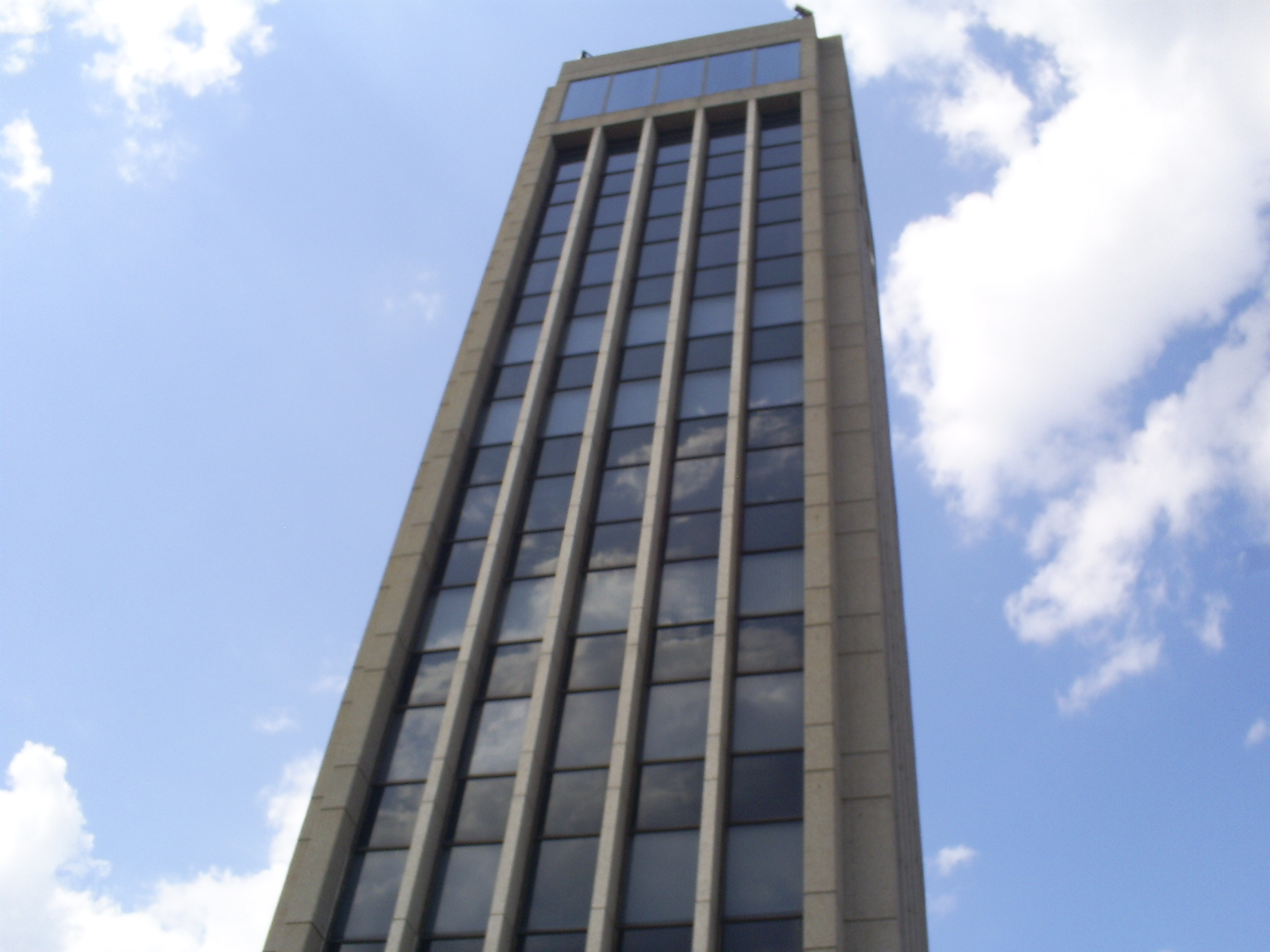
Hirsch Tower is the home of KFVS, WQTV and WQWQ.

KFVS began broadcasting on October 3, 1954, and aired an analog signal on VHF channel 12. It was owned by broadcasting pioneer Oscar C. Hirsch, who had signed-on the area's first radio station, KFVS radio (AM 960, now KZIM) in his radio shop in 1925. Although the KFVS call letters appear to stand for "Five States", they were actually randomly assigned by then-Secretary of Commerce Herbert Hoover. At the start, channel 12 did not have any video cameras. Instead, its first broadcast showed slides of its new transmitter tower that was under construction at the time. Channel 12 was housed along with its radio sister until 1968 when it moved to its present location on Broadway Avenue. Hirsch sold the station to Aflac in 1979, but his family retained the radio station until 1985.

In 1997, Aflac sold its entire broadcasting division, including KFVS, to a group headed by Retirement Systems of Alabama. It, in turn, merged with Ellis Communications a few months later to form Raycom Media. KFVS offered The Tube Music Network (a 24-hour digital music video channel) on its third digital subchannel which ceased operations on October 1, 2007.

=== Sale to Gray Television ===
On June 25, 2018, Atlanta-based Gray Television announced it had reached an agreement with Raycom to merge their respective broadcasting assets (consisting of Raycom's 63 existing owned-and/or-operated television stations, including KFVS and WQTV/WQWQ), and Gray's 93 television stations under the former's corporate umbrella. The cash-and-stock merger transaction valued at $3.6 billion—in which Gray shareholders would acquire preferred stock currently held by Raycom—resulted in KFVS and WQTV/WQWQ gaining new sister stations in nearby markets, including NBC/ABC affiliates KYTV and KSPR-LD in Springfield and ABC/Fox affiliate WBKO in Bowling Green, in addition to its current Raycom sister stations. The sale was approved on December 20, and was completed on January 2, 2019. KFVS-TV gained a new sister station in the market when Gray acquired ABC affiliate WSIL-TV (channel 3) on May 1, 2026.

== News operation ==
Compared with the other big four stations in the market, KFVS has traditionally covered Southeastern Missouri. KFVS offers secondary coverage of Southern Illinois from a newsroom on East Plaza Drive in Carterville near WSIL. NBC affiliate WPSD-TV, based in Paducah, focuses more on the Western Kentucky side although that station operates a bureau in Marion, Illinois and barely even covered the northern West Tennessee side of the market.

At one point in time, KFVS produced a nightly prime time newscast on WQTV/WQWQ. Known as Heartland News at 9, the show could be seen for a half-hour and was targeted specifically at a Southeastern Missouri audience. It competed with another broadcast in the time slot on Fox affiliate KBSI which also aired every night for thirty minutes. However, that program was produced by WPSD, so it featured more of a regional summary of headlines since it originated from the NBC outlet's facility in Kentucky. The WQTV/WQWQ newscast was dropped on July 29, 2007.

On October 1, 2010, Heartland News at 9 was brought back after a news share agreement was established with KBSI, which offers a nightly hour-long prime time newscast originating from the KFVS studios. With that addition, this station offers more than thirty hours of local news each week. On October 3, 2010, WPSD brought back its own newscast at 9 p.m. known as The Nine to both of its digital subchannels which is seen every night, except Saturdays, for a half-hour, until it was canceled in 2019. KBSI later debuted its own newscasts in March 2022, outsourced from ABC affiliate KLKN in Lincoln, Nebraska. Heartland News at 9 was moved to KFVS-DT2.

In July 2011, KFVS became the second news operation in the market to upgrade local news production to high definition level. Included with the switch was the debut of a new studio and updated graphics (the KBSI newscast was included in the change).

During weather segments, the station uses live NOAA National Weather Service radar data from several regional sites. This system is known on-air as "First Alert Doppler Network". KFVS also operates its own Doppler weather radar, called "Live StormTeam Radar", that is located on top of the Hirsch building. It is a Collins radar sold by ADC in Bloomington, Indiana, and is the only live radar source in the market since the National Weather Service data seen on rival stations is delayed.

== Technical information ==
=== Subchannels ===
The station's signal is multiplexed:

Subchannels of KFVS-TV
Subchannel	Res.	Short name	Programming
12.1	1080i	KFVS DT	CBS
12.2	720p	CW	The CW
12.3	480i	KFVSOUT	Outlaw
12.4	480i	MeTV	MeTV
12.5	480i	Grit	Grit
12.6	480i	Oxygen	Oxygen
12.7	480i	365BLK	365BLK

=== Analog-to-digital conversion ===
KFVS-TV shut down its analog signal, over VHF channel 12, on June 12, 2009, the official date on which full-power television stations in the United States transitioned from analog to digital broadcasts under federal mandate. The station's digital signal relocated from its pre-transition UHF channel 57, which was among the high band UHF channels (52–69) that were removed from broadcasting use as a result of the transition, to its analog-era VHF channel 12.

== Coverage area ==
KFVS refers to its viewing area as "The Heartland", which is included in KFVS-DT2's on-air branding. KFVS serves more than fifty counties in four states including all of southeastern Missouri, southern Illinois, western Kentucky, and northwestern Tennessee. KFVS considers Clay County as the only northeastern Arkansas county in its viewing area as shown during its nightly weather segments which be seen in the local temperature graphic. Cable systems in Corning, Piggott, Rector, Marmaduke, Pollard, Greenway, St. Francis, and Lafe, Arkansas list KFVS on their local cable lineups. However, Jonesboro and Lake City cable systems do not carry the station. According to DirecTV, KFVS is still carried on its Jonesboro area lineup as a local channel.

While broadcasting an analog signal, a portion of its off-air signal reached into the Missouri Bootheel overlapping with sister stations WMC-TV in Memphis, Tennessee, and KAIT in Jonesboro. During the analog era, KFVS's coverage area overlapped with KMOV in St. Louis, extending as north as Belleville, Illinois, with cable systems on the edge of both markets providing both stations until CBS forced carriage of only the market's given affiliate on those systems in the early 2010s.
