= KCAB =

KCAB may refer to:

- KCAB (AM), a radio station (980 AM) licensed to Dardanelle, Arkansas, United States
- KCAB-LP, a defunct low-power television station (channel 28) formerly licensed to Casa Grande, Arizona, United States
