= WOOZ-FM =

- Harrisburg, Illinois; United States
- Broadcast area: Marion–Carbondale, Illinois
- Frequency: 99.9 MHz
- Branding: New Country Z100

Programming
- Format: Country

Ownership
- Owner: Max Media; (River Radio LLC)
- Sister stations: WCIL, WCIL-FM, WUEZ, WJPF, WXLT

History
- First air date: 1947
- Former call signs: WEBQ-FM (1947–1989)

Technical information
- Licensing authority: FCC
- Facility ID: 74581
- Class: B
- ERP: 32,000 watts
- HAAT: 189.0 meters (620.1 ft)
- Transmitter coordinates: 37°36′45.00″N 88°52′3.00″W

Links
- Public license information: Public file; LMS
- Website: http://www.z100fm.com

WOOZ-FM (99.9 FM) is a radio station broadcasting a country music format. Licensed to Harrisburg, Illinois, United States, the station serves the Marion–Carbondale area. The station is owned by Max Media and licensed to River Radio LLC.

== History ==
The station was assigned the call letters WEBQ-FM in 1947. On August 2, 1989, the station changed its call sign to the current WOOZ-FM.

== Ownership ==
In December 2003, River Radio, acting as Max Media LLC (John Trinder, president/COO), reached an agreement to purchase WCIL, WCIL-FM, WJPF, WOOZ-FM, WUEZ, WXLT, KCGQ-FM, KEZS-FM, KGIR, KGKS, KJEZ, KKLR-FM, KLSC, KMAL, KSIM, KWOC, and KZIM from the Zimmer Radio Group (James L. Zimmer, owner). The reported value of this 17 station transaction was $43 million.
