= WNBS =

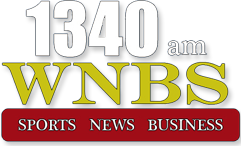
- Murray, Kentucky; United States
- Frequency: 1340 kHz
- Branding: 1340 am WNBS

Programming
- Format: Classic Hits
- Affiliations: Fox Sports Radio; Westwood One

Ownership
- Owner: Forever Communications, Inc.

History
- First air date: July 1948; 77 years ago
- Call sign meaning: W Nathan B Stubblefield

Technical information
- Licensing authority: FCC
- Facility ID: 29695
- Class: C
- Power: 1,000 watts unlimited
- Transmitter coordinates: 36°37′42″N 88°18′4″W
- Translator: (97.9 MHz) W250CK (Murray)

Links
- Public license information: Public file; LMS
- Webcast: Station Website
- Website: 1340wnbs.com

WNBS (1340 AM) is a radio station broadcasting a Classic Hits format. Licensed to and serving Murray, Kentucky, United States, the station is currently owned by Forever Communications, Inc. and features programming from Fox Sports Radio, and Westwood One.

== History ==
WNBS signed on in July 1948 under ownership by the newly-formed Murray Broadcasting Company. The station is named for Nathan B. Stubblefield, a Murray resident who was a pioneer in early experiments with wireless voice transmissions.

In 1957, the station was purchased by C.H. Pulse and Chuck Shuffett of Lebanon. In the late 1950s or 1960s, the station was knocked off the air by an airplane that crashed into the transmission tower in heavy fog.

In 1976, WNBS was sold to Timkay, Inc., but Shuffett reacquired the station in 1986. In 1991, Shuffett sold both WNBS and W46BE (UHF channel 46), to Keith Stubblefield. However, WNBS went off the air the same year when Stubblefield failed to make payments for the station or its employees. By 1992, the station returned to the air after Joe and Sam Parker, owners of WSJP, purchased the station.

When WNBS and WJSP was purchased by Forever Communications in 1997, WNBS was a music station while sister station WSJP (now WBZB) focused on news and talk. The two later switched formats and swapped programming to take advantage of the better nighttime signal on WNBS. W46BE, which would later be renamed as WQTV-LP, was sold to Murray State University, who used the station as a for-profit enterprise.

== Sports ==
WNBS is the home for Murray High School basketball (boys' and girls') and football, along with Murray State University Racers basketball (men's and women's) and football. They are also the local affiliate for St. Louis Cardinals baseball. With their Westwood One affiliation, they also air college football and basketball games periodically on the weekends, along with the Olympics and NCAA March Madness and bowl games.

WNBS also carries the program "Hey Coach", which is a coach's show featuring the coaches of the Murray State Racers (both basketball and football), takes place at local eatery The Big Apple Café and is hosted by Neal Bradley.

== Station events ==
WNBS (along with sister stations WFGS and WBZB) hold different events through the year.

- Annual Home, Lawn & Farm Show – This event dates back to 1989. It has always been the expo for vendors to show off their wares. There are always vendors that cater to different parts of the show, whether they represent HOME, LAWN or FARM. Often there are also "sub category" areas, like; Children's Play Area, Women's World or the Men's Sit a Spell. This event always occurs within the first quarter of the year. The Annual Home, Lawn & Farm show calls the CFSB Center home, thus scheduling is subject to Murray State University basketball games and/or other events that are brought in.

== Notable former staff ==
- Former Wheel of Fortune host Pat Sajak briefly served as a deejay at WNBS around 1972–73.
