= George McNeil =

George McNeil or McNeill may refer to:

- George McNeil (artist) (1908–1995), American abstract expressionist painter
- George McNeil (ice hockey) (1914–1997), Canadian ice hockey player and coach
- George McNeill (golfer) (born 1975), American golfer
- George McNeill (sprinter) (born 1947), Scottish athlete and footballer
- George E. McNeill (1836–1906), American labor leader and writer
- George Monroe McNeill (1845–1931), Union army soldier and a founder of Carterville, Illinois
