= KKLR-FM =

- Poplar Bluff, Missouri; United States
- Frequency: 94.5 MHz
- Branding: Clear 94.5

Programming
- Format: Country
- Affiliations: Premiere Networks

Ownership
- Owner: Max Media; (River Radio LLC)
- Sister stations: KJEZ, KWOC

History
- First air date: August 31, 1989
- Former call signs: KPBM-FM (?-1984); KWOC-FM (1984–1989)
- Call sign meaning: "KLeaR"

Technical information
- Licensing authority: FCC
- Facility ID: 6016
- Class: C1
- ERP: 100,000 watts
- HAAT: 245 meters (804 feet)
- Transmitter coordinates: 36°45′46″N 90°26′03″W

Links
- Public license information: Public file; LMS
- Webcast: Listen Live
- Website: clear94.com

KKLR-FM (94.5 MHz, "Clear 94.5") is a radio station licensed to serve Poplar Bluff, Missouri. The station is owned by Max Media. It airs a country music format. KKLR serves Poplar Bluff, southeast Missouri and extreme northeast Arkansas. KKLR's signal can be heard from West Plains, Missouri to Union City, Tennessee and from Farmington, Missouri to Osceola, Arkansas.

The station was assigned the KKLR call letters by the Federal Communications Commission on August 31, 1989.

== Ownership ==
Previous logo

In December 2003, River Radio, acting as Max Media LLC (John Trinder, president/COO), reached an agreement to purchase WCIL, WCIL-FM, WUEZ, WXLT, WOOZ-FM, WJPF, KGIR, KZIM, KEZS-FM, KCGQ-FM, KMAL, KLSC, KWOC, KJEZ, KKLR-FM, KGKS, and KSIM from the Zimmer Radio Group (James L. Zimmer, owner). The reported value of this 17 station transaction was $43 million.
