= KVLD =

KVLD may refer to:

- KVLD (FM), a radio station (91.7 FM) licensed to serve Norfolk, Nebraska, United States
- KASR, a radio station (99.3 FM) licensed to serve Atkins, Arkansas, United States, which held the call sign KVLD from 2002 to 2015
- Valdosta Regional Airport (ICAO code KVLD)
