= Carterville, Illinois =

- City
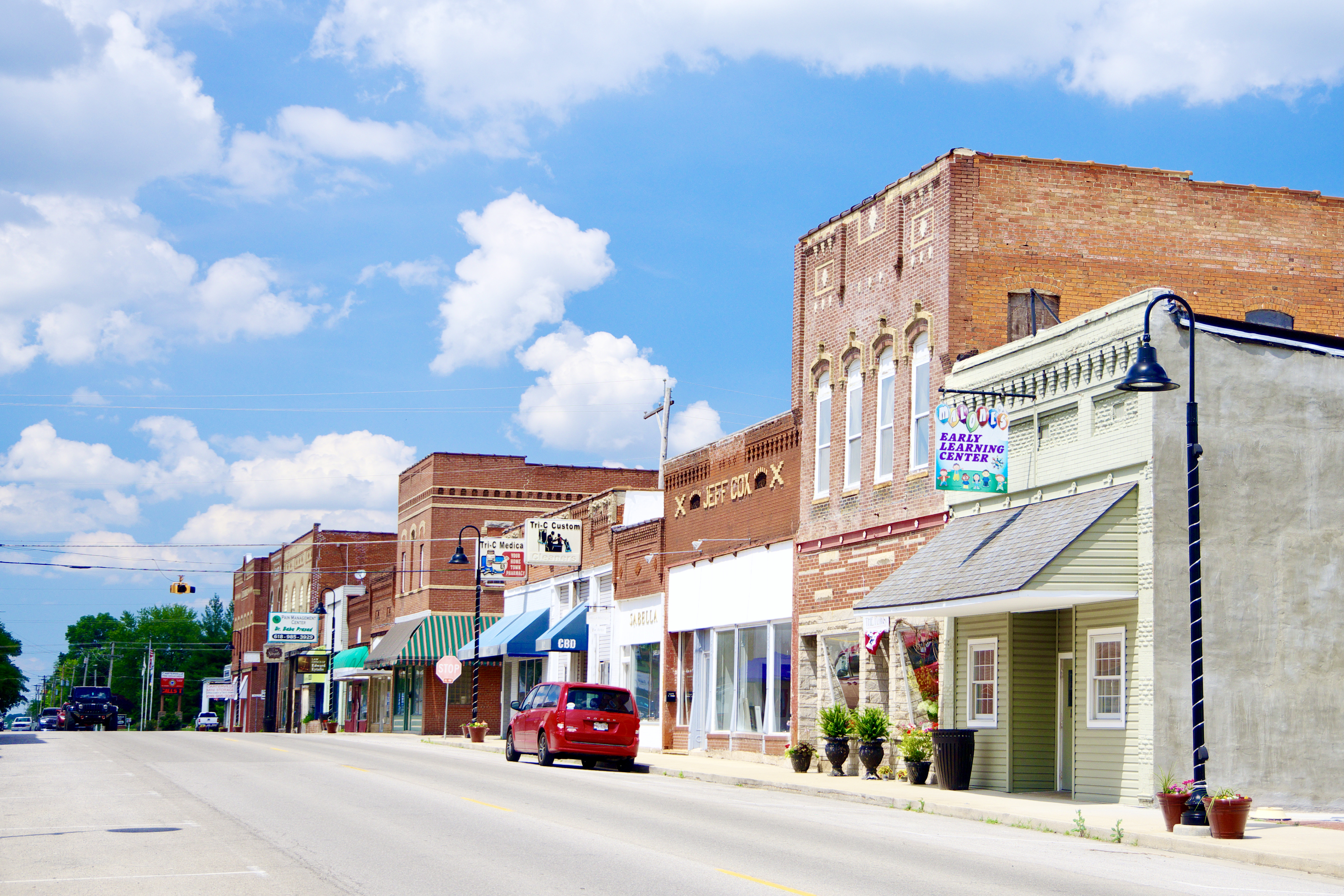
- Division St

- Location of Carterville in Williamson County, Illinois.
- Coordinates: 37°45′16″N 89°06′30″W
- Country: United States
- State: Illinois
- County: Williamson

Area
  - Total: 5.35 sq mi (13.86 km^{2})
  - Land: 5.27 sq mi (13.64 km^{2})
  - Water: 0.085 sq mi (0.22 km^{2})
- Elevation: 443 ft (135 m)

Population (2020)
  - Total: 5,848
  - Density: 1,110.5/sq mi (428.78/km^{2})
- Time zone: UTC-6 (CST)
  - Summer (DST): UTC-5 (CDT)
- ZIP Code: 62918
- Area code: 618
- FIPS code: 17-11514
- GNIS feature ID: 2393757
- Website: www.visitcarterville.com

Carterville is a city in Williamson County, Illinois, United States. At the 2020 census, the city's population was 5,848. The city is part of the Carbondale-Marion-Herrin combined statistical area and has grown considerably as a residential community of Carbondale and Marion.

The city is located next to Crab Orchard National Wildlife Refuge. The Refuge's 44,000 acres (180 km^{2}) of land and water contain a wide diversity of flora and fauna.

== History ==
Carterville was founded by George Monroe McNeill and Laban Carter. McNeill married Olive Herrin of Herrin's Prairie and in 1866 they settled on the farm now known as Carterville. Carter came to Williamson County in 1864, purchased 100 acres (0.40 km^{2}) of land, and helped organize and secure a post office for Carterville in 1871. The town was named in his honor. McNeill was one of the youngest members of the Union army during the American Civil War. He enlisted at 16 and was with General William T. Sherman during his March to the Sea.

== Geography ==
According to the 2010 census, the city has a total area of 5.28 square miles (13.7 km^{2}), of which 5.19 square miles (13.4 km^{2}) (or 98.30%) is land and 0.09 square miles (0.23 km^{2}) (or 1.70%) is water.

== Demographics ==
Historical population
Census	Pop.	Note	%±
1880	692		—
1890	969		40.0%
1900	1,749		80.5%
1910	2,971		69.9%
1920	3,404		14.6%
1930	2,866		−15.8%
1940	2,893		0.9%
1950	2,716		−6.1%
1960	2,643		−2.7%
1970	3,061		15.8%
1980	3,445		12.5%
1990	3,630		5.4%
2000	4,616		27.2%
2010	5,496		19.1%
2020	5,848		6.4%
U.S. Census

=== 2020 census ===
As of the 2020 census, Carterville had a population of 5,848. The median age was 37.1 years. 26.6% of residents were under the age of 18 and 16.4% of residents were 65 years of age or older. For every 100 females there were 95.7 males, and for every 100 females age 18 and over there were 89.3 males age 18 and over.

95.0% of residents lived in urban areas, while 5.0% lived in rural areas.

There were 2,368 households in Carterville, of which 35.5% had children under the age of 18 living in them. Of all households, 48.9% were married-couple households, 16.2% were households with a male householder and no spouse or partner present, and 27.7% were households with a female householder and no spouse or partner present. About 27.3% of all households were made up of individuals and 12.1% had someone living alone who was 65 years of age or older. The city had 2,545 families.

There were 2,656 housing units, of which 10.8% were vacant. The homeowner vacancy rate was 2.1% and the rental vacancy rate was 15.0%. The population density was 2,339.2 inhabitants per square mile (903.2/km^{2}).

Racial composition as of the 2020 census
Race	Number	Percent
White	5,111	87.4%
Black or African American	135	2.3%
American Indian and Alaska Native	17	0.3%
Asian	179	3.1%
Native Hawaiian and Other Pacific Islander	4	0.1%
Some other race	47	0.8%
Two or more races	355	6.1%
Hispanic or Latino (of any race)	173	3.0%

=== 2000 census ===
In 2000, there were 1,933 households, out of which 32.1% had children under the age of 18 living with them, 54.4% were married couples living together, 10.0% had a female householder with no husband present, and 33.1% were non-families. 28.0% of all households were made up of individuals, and 10.8% had someone living alone who was 65 years of age or older. The average household size was 2.39 and the average family size was 2.95.

In the city the population was spread out, with 25.2% under the age of 18, 10.0% from 18 to 24, 28.1% from 25 to 44, 23.1% from 45 to 64, and 13.6% who were 65 years of age or older. The median age was 36 years. For every 100 females, there were 93.9 males. For every 100 females age 18 and over, there were 91.0 males.

The median income for a household in the city was $36,969, and the median income for a family was $44,722. Males had a median income of $34,231 versus $24,924 for females. The per capita income for the city was $18,884. About 9.9% of families and 14.6% of the population were below the poverty line, including 15.4% of those under age 18 and 7.1% of those age 65 or over.

== Education ==
Carterville is home to John A. Logan College, named for the local American Civil War hero and politician John A. Logan. A college of approximately 3,500 students students, John A. Logan College was featured in Rolling Stone magazine as the nation's fifth best community college and in 2004 was recognized as one of the fastest growing community colleges in the nation.

Carterville High School received a silver medal and ranked 94th in Illinois on U.S. News & World Report's 2016 list of the nation's best high schools. CHS was the only public high school in southern Illinois that performed above the state average of 21 on ACT testing.

The Carterville Unit 5 Schools' athletic programs have been successful in the past, winning the IHSA State Conference Championship in Class 3A football in 1996 and in Class 2A softball in 2008 and 2016. The Carterville Varsity Cheer squad hold the record for the most wins in IHSA history.

Katherine Hendricks won three consecutive IHSA Class A girls pole vault state championships (2005–2007), clearing 11 feet 2 inches in 2005 and 11 feet 3 inches in both 2006 and 2007.

== Media ==
Carterville is home to River Radio of Southern Illinois, a group of radio stations serving the Marion-Carbondale area. They include WOOZ-FM New Country Z100, 95.1 Steve FM (WUEZ), NewsRadio WJPF, Today's Hit Music WCIL-FM, and 103.5 ESPN.

WSIL-TV, the ABC affiliate for the Cape Girardeau–Paducah–Harrisburg television market which is co-owned by Gray Media with Cape Girardeau-based CBS affiliate KFVS-TV, has been based in Carterville since 1989.

== Notable people ==
- C. W. Bishop, Congressman, Carterville city clerk and postmaster
- Mark Gottfried, college basketball coach
- George Monroe McNeill, founder
- Glenn Poshard, United States Representative and President of Southern Illinois University
- Rodney Watson, college basketball coach
