= WBLN =

WBLN may refer to:

- WBLN-LP, a low-power radio station (104.9 FM) licensed to Glens Falls, New York, United States
- WZYK, a radio station (94.7 FM) licensed to Clinton, Kentucky, United States, which used the call sign WBLN from March 1997 to March 1998
- WFGS, a radio station (103.7 FM) licensed to Murray, Kentucky, United States, which used the call sign WBLN-FM from October 1988 to March 1997
- WBLN (WB 100+), a former television station (channel 14) in Charleston, South Carolina, United States
- WYZZ-TV, a television station (channel 43) licensed to Bloomington, Illinois, United States, which used the call sign WBLN from 1982 to September 1985
- an earlier TV station from the same license city (Bloomington, Illinois) which ran from 1953 to 1958
