= KWKK =

- Russellville, Arkansas; United States
- Broadcast area: Russellville, Arkansas
- Frequency: 100.9 MHz
- Branding: River Hits 100.9

Programming
- Format: Adult contemporary

Ownership
- Owner: Bobby Caldwell; (EAB of Russellville, LLC)
- Sister stations: KCAB, KASR, KCON, KVOM, KVOM-FM, KCJC, KYEL

History
- First air date: September 29, 1985 (as KAIO)
- Former call signs: KAIO (1984–1990)

Technical information
- Licensing authority: FCC
- Facility ID: 31884
- Class: A
- ERP: 6,000 watts
- HAAT: 100 meters (330 ft)
- Transmitter coordinates: 35°16′59″N 93°06′08″W

Links
- Public license information: Public file; LMS
- Webcast: Listen Live
- Website: riverhitskwkk.com

KWKK (100.9 FM) is a radio station airing an adult contemporary format licensed to Russellville, Arkansas. The station is owned by Bobby Caldwell's East Arkansas Broadcasters, through licensee EAB of Russellville, LLC.

Formerly owned by Max Media, KWKK and five other stations were sold to East Arkansas Broadcasters for $3 million; the transaction was consummated on January 9, 2014.
