= Saluki Radio Network =

American collegiate broadcasting network in Illinois

- Type: Radio network
- Country: United States
- Headquarters: Carbondale, Illinois
- Broadcast area: Southeastern Illinois
- Established: September 1968
- Affiliation: Southern Illinois Salukis
- Affiliates: 3
- Official website: siusalukis.com/watch

The Saluki Radio Network are radio stations in the U.S. states serving southeastern Illinois that broadcast Southern Illinois Salukis sports events. The network is managed by Learfield.

== Affiliates ==
The Saluki Radio Network currently has 3 affiliate stations.

Station	Frequency	City	Sports carried
WCIL-FM	101.5	Carbondale, Illinois	Football, men's basketball
WJPF	1340	Herrin, Illinois	Women's basketball
WUEZ	95.1	Carterville, Illinois	Postseason baseball, postseason softball
