= KCON (FM) =

- Vilonia, Arkansas; United States
- Broadcast area: Conway, Arkansas
- Frequency: 92.7 MHz
- Branding: Big 92.7

Programming
- Format: Classic hits

Ownership
- Owner: East Arkansas Broadcasters; (EAB of Morrilton, LLC)
- Sister stations: KCAB, KASR, KCJC, KVOM, KVOM-FM, KWKK, KYEL

History
- First air date: 1984 (as KTOD-FM)
- Former call signs: KTOD-FM (1984–1996); KASR (1996–2021)
- Call sign meaning: Conway

Technical information
- Licensing authority: FCC
- Facility ID: 14465
- Class: C3
- ERP: 25,000 watts
- HAAT: 100 meters (330 ft)
- Transmitter coordinates: 35°3′26″N 92°4′16″W

Links
- Public license information: Public file; LMS
- Website: KCON Online

KCON (92.7 MHz) is an FM radio station broadcasting a classic hits format. Licensed to Vilonia, Arkansas, United States, it serves the Little Rock area. The station is currently owned by East Arkansas Broadcasters, through licensee EAB of Morrilton, LLC. Its studios are in Conway, and the transmitter is in Magness.

== History ==
KCON started out in 1984 as KTOD-FM. Known as "The Voice of Toadsuck Country", it aired a country music format. Over the years, the station also played an adult contemporary music format in 1992, before changing to its current sports format. The call sign was changed to KASR, for "Arkansas Sports Radio", in 1996.

Effective April 30, 2021, Creative Media sold KASR to East Arkansas Broadcasters for $525,000. With no change in format or imaging, the call letters were switched with KCON (99.3 FM) in Atkins on August 1, 2021, placing the KCON designation closer to Conway, where an AM station had previously used them.
