= KCJC =

Radio station in Dardanelle, Arkansas

- Dardanelle, Arkansas; United States
- Frequency: 102.3 MHz
- Branding: River Country 102.3

Programming
- Format: Country music
- Affiliations: Fox News Radio

Ownership
- Owner: Bobby Caldwell; (EAB of Russellville, LLC)
- Sister stations: KCAB, KASR, KCON, KVOM, KVOM-FM, KWKK, KYEL

History
- First air date: 1965
- Former call signs: KCAB-FM (1965–1974); KWKK (1974–1995)

Technical information
- Licensing authority: FCC
- Facility ID: 31886
- Class: C3
- ERP: 1,450 watts
- HAAT: 403.0 meters (1,322.2 ft)
- Transmitter coordinates: 35°13′41″N 93°15′20″W
- Translator: 96.7 K244FP (Dardanelle)

Links
- Public license information: Public file; LMS
- Webcast: Listen live
- Website: Official website

KCJC (102.3 FM, River Country 102.3) is a radio station broadcasting a country music format. Licensed to Dardanelle, Arkansas, United States, the station is currently owned by Bobby Caldwell's East Arkansas Broadcasters, through licensee EAB of Russellville, LLC, and features programming from Fox News Radio.

== History ==
Central Arkansas Broadcasting Company, Inc., put KCAB-FM on the air in 1965 as the sister station to KCAB (then at 1320 AM). The call letters were changed to KWKK on May 6, 1974, and the current KCJC on October 1, 1995.

Formerly owned by Max Media, KCJC and five other stations were sold to East Arkansas Broadcasters for $3 million; the transaction was consummated on January 9, 2014.
