= WSIL-TV =

Television station in Harrisburg, Illinois

WSIL-TV and KPOB-TV

WSIL-TV: Harrisburg–Marion–Carbondale, Illinois; Cape Girardeau, Missouri; Paducah, Kentucky; KPOB-TV: Poplar Bluff, Missouri; United States
- Channels for WSIL-TV: Digital: 34 (UHF); Virtual: 3
- Channels for KPOB-TV: Digital: 15 (UHF); Virtual: 15
- Branding: WSIL-TV: WSIL-TV; Heartland News: Southern Illinois Edition; KPOB-TV: KPOB-TV

Programming
- Affiliations: 3.1/15.1: ABC; for others, see § Subchannels

Ownership
- Owner: Gray Media; (Gray Television Licensee, LLC)
- Sister stations: KFVS-TV, WQWQ-LD

History
- First air date: WSIL-TV: December 6, 1953; KPOB-TV: September 1, 1961
- Former channel number: WSIL-TV: Analog: 22 (UHF, 1953–1959); 3 (VHF, 1959–2009); KPOB-TV: Analog: 15 (UHF, 1961–2009); Digital: 18 (UHF, until 2009)
- Former affiliations: WSIL-TV: Independent (1953–1954); NBC (1954–1959)
- Call sign meaning: WSIL-TV: Southern Illinois; KPOB-TV: Poplar Bluff

Technical information
- Licensing authority: FCC
- Facility ID: WSIL-TV: 73999; KPOB-TV: 73998
- ERP: WSIL-TV: 1,000 kW; KPOB-TV: 34.5 kW
- HAAT: WSIL-TV: 291 m (955 ft); KPOB-TV: 184 m (604 ft)
- Transmitter coordinates: WSIL-TV: 37°36′50″N 88°52′20″W; KPOB-TV: 36°48′4″N 90°27′6″W
- Translator: K10KM-D 10 Cape Girardeau, MO

Links
- Public license information: WSIL-TV: Public file; LMS; KPOB-TV: Public file; LMS
- Website: www.heartlandnews.com

WSIL-TV (channel 3) in Harrisburg, Illinois, and KPOB-TV (channel 15) in Poplar Bluff, Missouri, are television stations serving as the ABC affiliates for Southern Illinois, Southeast Missouri, the Purchase area of Western Kentucky, and Northwest Tennessee. They are owned by Gray Media alongside CBS/CW affiliate KFVS-TV (channel 12) and Telemundo affiliate WQWQ-LD (channel 9). WSIL-TV and KPOB-TV maintain studio facilities on Country Aire Drive (near the IL 13–Wolf Creek Road interchange) in Carterville, Illinois. WSIL-TV's transmitter is located near Creal Springs, Illinois, while KPOB's tower is on US 60 northwest of Poplar Bluff.

KPOB-TV serves as a full-time satellite of WSIL-TV, covering the Missouri Bootheel and northeastern Arkansas. WSIL-TV also operates translator K10KM-D (channel 10) in Cape Girardeau, Missouri.

WSIL-TV was the first television station in southern Illinois, debuting on ultra high frequency (UHF) channel 22 on December 6, 1953. It soon affiliated with ABC and NBC before moving to channel 3 in 1959 and becoming a sole ABC affiliate. KPOB-TV went on the air in 1961; aside from a brief period in the 1980s, it has simulcast WSIL with separate legal identifications for the better part of its history. The station has focused its news coverage almost exclusively on Southern Illinois since the 1980s, since its broadcast coverage area is not as large as those of the other major stations in the market. It has traditionally fallen behind its two rivals in the market in news ratings and resources, though less so now than in decades past. After having two ownership groups almost all of its first 65 years on air, it was sold to Quincy Media in 2018, to Allen Media Group in 2021, and to Gray in 2026.

== History ==
=== Construction on channel 22 ===
When the Federal Communications Commission (FCC) lifted its four-year freeze on new television station allocations in 1952, channel 22 in the then-new ultra high frequency (UHF) band was assigned to Harrisburg. The Turner-Farrar Association, whose partners owned movie theaters in Southern Illinois, applied for the channel on June 23, 1952, and received a construction permit on March 11, 1953.

With the permit in hand, Turner-Farrar began construction on the station's studio facility in what was known as the Lockwood building on Poplar Street in Harrisburg, absorbing a former billiards hall in the process. A 550-foot (170 m) tower was erected on the site for the transmission facility. The station began broadcasting a test pattern on December 3, 1953. Two days later, an open house was held at the studios, and regular programming from Southern Illinois's first TV station began on December 6.

The station had no network affiliation in its early months, but it added ABC in March 1954, followed by NBC in December 1955.

=== Move to channel 3; construction of KPOB ===
Soon after starting WSIL-TV on channel 22, Turner-Farrar petitioned for the FCC to assign a channel in the more widely available VHF band. In its first attempt, denied in July 1956, the company attempted to have channel 13 relocated to Harrisburg from Bowling Green, Kentucky. The next month, Turner-Farrar applied to have channel 22 changed to channel 3. This proposal, along with the addition of educational channel 8 to Carbondale, was approved by the FCC in March 1958; in doing so, the commission rejected a competing proposal to allocate channel 3 to Carbondale. Construction of the channel 3 facility was completed in early March 1959, and on March 4, WSIL-TV signed on channel 3 from a new transmitter in Creal Springs, increasing its coverage area; the original tower at Harrisburg remained in place and was utilized for communications purposes. Coinciding with the move to VHF, WSIL-TV became ABC's 87th primary affiliate.

In May 1960, the Turner–Farrar Association applied to the FCC to build UHF channel 15 in Poplar Bluff to serve southeast Missouri. The transmitter was completed in August 1961, and KPOB-TV began broadcasting programs on September 1 of that year. KPOB-TV was off the air on several occasions in its first 15 years: for over a month in June and July 1962 (due to lack of network signal), from September 1966 to October 1967 for renovations, and for more than a month in 1974 for construction. The last of these outages, from April 1976 to January 1977, was for financial reasons. During this time, WSIL attempted to sell KPOB-TV to the Hernreich Group, which would have switched it to rebroadcasting KAIT in Jonesboro, Arkansas, but negotiations proved unfruitful. In the early 1980s, KPOB briefly broadcast some local programming of its own.

=== New ownership in the 1980s ===
Turner-Farrar continued in the television business until 1980, when it announced it would sell WSIL-TV and KPOB to a group headed by Macauley "Mackie" Nicholes, the radio voice of Southern Illinois Salukis men's basketball, in what amounted to a partial trade. As part of the transaction, O. L. Turner acquired radio stations WEBQ and WEBQ-FM from Nicholes. FCC approval was granted in May 1981, allowing the $3 million (equivalent to $8.98 million in 2025) TV station transaction and $700,000 (equivalent to $2.1 million in 2025) radio station sale to go forward.

Nicholes, who together with cable television system operator John Kirby owned 92 percent of WSIL's stock, faced a monumental task in trying to improve WSIL-TV. A feature in The Southern Illinoisan noted that under Turner-Farrar's stewardship, channel 3 operated on a very low budget with equipment dating back to the 1950s. This put the station at a disadvantage compared to its principal competitors in the region—NBC affiliate WPSD-TV in Paducah, Kentucky, and CBS affiliate KFVS-TV in Cape Girardeau, Missouri. According to The Southern Illinoisan, WSIL had a reputation as "a station that illustrates a flood by showing its audience a hand-drawn picture of a lake in the corner of the screen, rather than sending a film crew to the scene". When Nicholes and Kirby took over, they inherited a station which had 30 total employees, including five news staffers; its two principal competitors had more than 20 people in their news departments and employed over 90 people total. WSIL's newscasts were the lowest-rated in the market by some margin, commanding only 5% of the audience compared to 38% and 42% for the other stations, respectively. Further, channel 3's 887-foot (270 m) tower in Creal Springs was much shorter than the 2,000-foot (610 m) structures of its rivals, limiting WSIL's reach in its four-state market. While it covered the Illinois portion of the market very well, it had inferior coverage in the Kentucky and Missouri portions, and its signal did not extend into Tennessee. However, due to longstanding FCC restrictions on the channel 3 allotment, WSIL-TV could not increase its power without encroaching on a station on the same channel to the north. This effectively prevented WSIL from obtaining signal parity with KFVS and WPSD. Seeing no realistic chance of the market being fully realized, Nicholes decided to focus channel 3's newscasts almost exclusively on Southern Illinois. While he realized this would consign WSIL to third place in the market, he said he was determined to contend in Southern Illinois while being a respectable No. 3 in the larger market.

In 1981, for the first fall season under the new owners, the station revamped its evening lineup; it ceased the practice of tape-delaying World News Tonight. The station moved its cartoon program, Uncle Briggs and the Funny Company, from early evenings to early mornings; the show, which traced its origins back to the station's first day on air in 1953 as a hosted Western movie with a local "Cactus Pete", was canceled in April 1982 as part of an effort to professionalize the station. Uncle Briggs, real name Briggs Gordon, continued with WEBQ radio until his death in 1988.

Nicholes sold his stake in WSIL-TV to Kirby in December 1982. Months later, Kirby agreed to sell the station to Mel Wheeler, Inc., a Texas-based radio station owner, for $6.6 million (equivalent to $17.9 million in 2025). The transmitter facility was revamped in 1984, including a 210-foot (64 m) height extension to the tower. The station also relocated from its increasingly outmoded and cramped Harrisburg studio. In 1983, Wheeler had purchased a tract of land in Crainville, Illinois, a site which would be more centrally located to Marion and Carbondale for news coverage and advertising sales, but did not make the move; however, serious consideration to leaving Harrisburg for Crainville recurred in 1987. Construction began on the new facility in September 1988.

Under Mel Wheeler, Inc., WSIL-TV became a family affair. Steve Wheeler, Mel's son, had become the operations manager and general manager by 1986; his wife, Bonnie, served as the news director. Under Wheeler, WSIL-TV continued to focus its news department exclusively on Southern Illinois news. Ratings improved but remained behind the competition; at 10 p.m., when all three local stations aired news, WSIL captured 12 percent of the audience compared to 51 percent watching KFVS and 35 percent viewing WPSD. Despite equipment improvements—such as the launch of a digital signal in 2002, a refresh of the news set and imaging in 2004, and the introduction of high-definition local news in 2010—as well as the launch of a morning newscast in 2004, WSIL continued to remain off the pace of KFVS and WPSD; it was third in revenue (using 2013 data) and ratings (as of 2014).

The station was one of 57 ABC affiliates that refused to air NYPD Blue during its first season in 1993–1994 due to objections over its content; the show aired in the market on Fox affiliate KBSI. Steve Wheeler appeared on Good Morning America to explain his decision; he announced during the interview that if the program was successful, WSIL would reconsider. Citing his feeling that the show's content had been toned down since its pilot episode, Wheeler approved the program for air on WSIL-TV beginning in September 1994.

=== Quincy, Allen and Gray ownership ===
On October 31, 2018, Quincy Media announced that it would acquire WSIL-TV and KPOB-TV for $24.5 million (equivalent to $30.9 million in 2025). The sale was approved by the FCC on December 20 and completed on January 15, 2019.

Two years later, on February 1, 2021, Gray Television announced the purchase of Quincy Media for $925 million (equivalent to $1.08 billion in 2025). As Gray already owned KFVS-TV, also within the top four stations in ratings in the Paducah–Cape Girardeau–Harrisburg market, it opted to keep that station and sell WSIL–KPOB in order to satisfy FCC requirements. On April 29, 2021, it was announced that Allen Media Broadcasting would acquire WSIL, KPOB, and the remaining Quincy stations not being acquired by Gray Television for $380 million (equivalent to $445 million in 2025). The sale was completed on August 2.

On January 17, 2025, Allen Media Group announced plans to cut local meteorologist/weather forecaster positions from its stations, including WSIL, and replacing them with a "weather hub" produced by The Weather Channel, which AMG also owns. The decision was reversed within a week by management in response to "viewer and advertiser reaction".

On June 1, 2025, amid financial woes and rising debt, Allen Media Group announced that it would explore "strategic options" for the company, such as a sale of its television stations (including WSIL/KPOB). On August 8, 2025, it was announced that AMG would sell 12 of its stations, including WSIL/KPOB, to Gray Media for $171 million; in the Paducah–Cape Girardeau–Harrisburg market, this would create a duopoly with KFVS-TV. The sale was completed on May 1, 2026.

== Technical information ==
=== Subchannels ===
WSIL-TV's transmitter is located near Creal Springs, Illinois; KPOB-TV's tower is on US 60 northwest of Poplar Bluff. The stations' signals are multiplexed:

Subchannels of WSIL-TV and KPOB-TV
Subchannel		Res.	Short name		Programming
WSIL-TV	KPOB-TV	Res.	WSIL-TV	KPOB-TV	Programming
3.1	15.1	720p	WSILABC	KPOB-TV	ABC
3.2	15.2	480i	HandI	KPOB-TV	Heroes & Icons
3.3	15.3	480i	TCN	KPOB-TV	True Crime Network
3.4	15.4	480i	CourtTV	KPOB-TV	Court TV
3.5	15.5	480i	Ion		Ion

=== Analog-to-digital conversion ===
WSIL-TV ended regular programming on its analog signal, over VHF channel 3, on June 12, 2009, the official date on which full-power television stations in the United States transitioned from analog to digital broadcasts under federal mandate. The station's digital signal remained on its pre-transition UHF channel 34, using virtual channel 3. As part of the SAFER Act, WSIL kept its analog signal on the air until June 26 to inform viewers of the digital television transition through a loop of public service announcements from the National Association of Broadcasters.

KPOB-TV shut down its analog signal, over UHF channel 15, on June 12, 2009; the station's digital signal relocated from its pre-transition UHF channel 18 to channel 15.
