= KCAB (AM) =

Radio station in Dardanelle, Arkansas

- Dardanelle, Arkansas; United States
- Frequency: 980 kHz
- Branding: 97.1 Bob FM

Programming
- Format: Adult hits
- Affiliations: Bob FM network

Ownership
- Owner: Bobby Caldwell; (EAB of Russellville, LLC)
- Sister stations: KCJC, KCON, KASR, KVOM, KVOM-FM, KWKK, KYEL

History
- First air date: 1980

Technical information
- Licensing authority: FCC
- Facility ID: 31885
- Class: D
- Power: 5,000 watts day 32 watts night
- Transmitter coordinates: 35°13′20″N 93°10′8″W
- Translator: 97.1 K246CT (Dardanelle)

Links
- Public license information: Public file; LMS
- Webcast: Listen Live

KCAB (980 kHz) is an AM radio station licensed to Dardanelle, Arkansas, United States. The station is currently owned by Bobby Caldwell's East Arkansas Broadcasters, through licensee EAB of Russellville, LLC.

Former logo

Formerly owned by Max Media, KCAB and five other stations were sold to current owners East Arkansas Broadcasters for $3 million; the transaction was consummated on January 9, 2014. The station simulcasts on a translator, FM 97.1.

== Programming ==
KCAB's former weekday local programming included the "Swap Shop" program from 9:00 to 10:00 a.m (also airs on Saturdays); and "Spotlight on the River Valley," a local talk show hosted by Johnny Story. Syndicated programming included "Good Day" with Doug Stephan, The Rush Limbaugh Show and Sean Hannity. The station also aired Arkansas Tech University sports.
