= WFGS =

Coordinates: 36.550°N 88.331°W

- Murray, Kentucky; United States
- Broadcast area: Murray - Jackson Purchase; Land Between the Lakes National Recreation Area
- Frequency: 103.7 MHz
- Branding: Froggy 103.7

Programming
- Format: Country

Ownership
- Owner: Forever Communications
- Sister stations: WNBS, WBZB

History
- First air date: 1977
- Former call signs: WAAW (1977–1988); WBLN-FM (1988–1997); WFGE (1997–2008)

Technical information
- Licensing authority: FCC
- Facility ID: 73269
- Class: C1
- ERP: 100,000 watts
- HAAT: 201 meters (659 ft)

Links
- Public license information: Public file; LMS
- Website: froggy103.com

WFGS (103.7 FM) is a radio station located in Murray, Kentucky. Owned by Forever Communications, the station airs a country music format as "Froggy 103.7".

== History ==
The station went on the air as WAAW in 1977, owned by Murray Broadcasting Company and an album oriented rock format. In 1988, the station was sold to Jackson Purchase Broadcasting, which changed the call to WBLN and flipped to an adult contemporary format. After being sold to Forever Communications, 103.7 became a country station with the call sign WFGE. In July 2008, the owner elected to move the Murray station's call sign to another station with the Froggy branding based in Pennsylvania. The old WFGE then became WFGS.

== Current programming ==
Froggy 103.7 airs CMT Country Countdown USA featuring Lon Helton. Other syndicated shows include The Lia Show. Froggy 103.7 is home to the Murray State University Racers football and basketball. In May 2015, MSU announced the renewal of their contract with WFGS through the 2019–2020 seasons for both football and basketball.

The station, for a short time, was an affiliate of the Tennessee Titans Radio Network.
