= KYEL =

Radio station in Arkansas

- Danville, Arkansas; United States
- Broadcast area: Yell County
- Frequency: 105.5 MHz
- Branding: 99.3/105.5 The Eagle

Programming
- Format: Classic rock (KASR simulcast)
- Affiliations: Westwood One, CBS Radio

Ownership
- Owner: Bobby Caldwell; (EAB of Russellville, LLC)
- Sister stations: KASR, KCAB, KCJC, KVOM, KVOM-FM, KWKK

History
- First air date: April 10, 2002
- Call sign meaning: K YELl County

Technical information
- Licensing authority: FCC
- Facility ID: 76511
- Class: A
- ERP: 4,400 watts
- HAAT: 116 meters (381 ft)
- Transmitter coordinates: 35°06′11″N 93°13′58″W

Links
- Public license information: Public file; LMS
- Webcast: Listen Live
- Website: 993theeagle.com

KYEL (105.5 FM, "99.3/105.5 The Eagle") is a radio station licensed to serve Danville, Arkansas, United States. The station is owned by Bobby Caldwell's EAB of Russellville, LLC. It airs a classic rock music format.

The station was assigned the KYEL call letters by the Federal Communications Commission on April 10, 2002.

On March 1, 2017, KYEL changed their format from country to a simulcast of classic rock-formatted KCON 99.3 FM Atkins (now KASR). (info taken from stationintel.com)
