= George Monroe McNeill =

George Monroe McNeill (June 5, 1845 – February 13, 1931) was a Union army soldier and was the first postmaster and one of the founders and trustees of Carterville, Illinois.

== Biography ==
McNeill was born on June 5, 1845, to John Alexander McNeill and Weltha "Welthy" Jane McNeill née Walker. McNeill served in the Union Army during the American Civil War, enlisting at the age of 16 to replace his sick father and serving under General Sherman during his March to the Sea. Sometime in the course of the war McNeill also became ill, riding behind his regiment at the Grand Review of the Armies at Washington. He later married Olive Herrin of Herrin Prairie and in 1866 settled on the farm that would become Carterville.

Upon completion of the Shawneetown and Carbondale railroad in the area, McNeill and Laban Carter, the namesake of Carterville, successfully lobbied for the Fredonia post office to be moved to Carter's farm and mine. McNeill was subsequently appointed postmaster. When the town was incorporated in 1872 and elections held in the nearby Crainville, McNeill was also appointed trustee of the city of Carterville.
