= KVOM (AM) =

- Morrilton, Arkansas; United States
- Broadcast area: Russellville, Arkansas; Conway, Arkansas
- Frequency: 800 kHz
- Branding: 98.9 FM 800 AM Motown Radio

Programming
- Format: Oldies
- Affiliations: St. Louis Cardinals Radio Network

Ownership
- Owner: Bobby Caldwell; (EAB of Morrilton, LLC)
- Sister stations: KCAB, KASR, KCON, KCJC, KVOM-FM, KWKK, KYEL

History
- First air date: December 25, 1952

Technical information
- Licensing authority: FCC
- Facility ID: 43830
- Class: D (AM & FM)
- Power: 250 watts day; 40 watts night
- Transmitter coordinates: 35°09′28.0″N 92°46′04.5″W
- Translator: 98.9 K255DN (Conway)

Links
- Public license information: Public file; LMS

KVOM (800 kHz) is an AM radio station licensed to Morrilton, Arkansas, United States. The station is owned by Bobby Caldwell's East Arkansas Broadcasters, through licensee EAB of Morrilton, LLC. KVOM translates on K255DN (FM 98.9), presenting a format of oldies rock and roll, R&B and pop, along with news, weather, local sports and St. Louis Cardinals baseball.

== History ==
On Christmas Day, 1952, radio station KVOM-AM in Morrilton went on the air for the first time. It had been about two years since the inception of the idea for a radio station in the community.

In 1950, after the sale of his bakeries in Russellville, J.C. Willis was interested in getting into a totally different line of business. A friend, the late Russ Horne (who had a radio station in Russellville), suggested that Willis enter the broadcasting business also. Consequently, Morrilton was chosen for the location of the station.

The application to build radio station KVOM was made to the Federal Communications Commission on May 10, 1951. The studios and tower would be located on Highway 64, one-half mile east of Morrilton, on land leased from Mrs. Roy Chaney and the late Col. Roy R. Chaney. The construction permit was granted in July 1952; the permit to construct the tower and other installations was received in October, 1952, and permission was granted to KVOM to go on the air on December 25, 1952, as a partnership consisting of Willis as principal partner and Horne and L.L. Bryan, also of Russellville. They would be doing business as Morrilton Broadcasting Company. Willis purchased Horne's interest in 1955 and Bryan's interest in 1959, making him the sole owner and licensee.

KVOM was a daytime station operating from sunrise to sunset on the clear channel frequency of 800 kHzwith 250 watts power At that time, the tower for the station was the tallest between Little Rock and Fort Smith, being 263 feet tall.

Mr. Willis' family also worked at KVOM at various times during the years; his wife, Ella Mae, joined the staff in 1956 as secretary and bookkeeper. In 1975, a license application was made and approved for the ownership of KVOM to be changed to a partnership of J.C. Willis, Ella Mae Willis and Stanton (Stan) C. Willis. That partnership was later changed to Morrilton Broadcasting Company, Inc., with J.C. Willis as president; Stanton C. Willis as vice-president, and Ella Mae Willis, Secretary-Treasurer.

In 1977, Morrilton Broadcasting Company made formal application to the FCC for an FM broadcast station to operate at 3000 watts, located at 101.7 MHz. The construction permit was granted in 1979 but in the meantime it was decided that a move to a different location with larger facilities would be feasible. Morrilton Broadcasting Company acquired property on Highway 113 West and built new facilities for both AM and FM broadcasting with the tower also moved to the new site. In July 1980, KVOM AM-FM began broadcasting from the location (where the stations are still located today).

Over the next three years, Stan Willis took over a large part of the managerial duties of KVOM, and upon the death of his father in January 1984, became president of Morrilton Broadcasting Company and General Manager of KVOM. In 1988, he was elected president of the Arkansas Broadcasters Association.

In 1995, the Willis family sold the radio stations to a new partnership, KVOM, Inc., consisting of principals Linda Cate and Francis Harp and station employees Nichols, Bailey and Rich Moellers.

The following information was taken from corporate records of KVOM, Inc. and from the "History" link of River Valley Radio's website (also written by the author of this article):

Harp was manager of the station at that time (and also served as president of the Arkansas Broadcasters Association during her tenure as manager). The principals had other broadcasting interests around Arkansas - including River Valley Radio Group, LLC, formed when they acquired three Russellville/Dardanelle stations, KWKK-FM, KCJC-FM and KCAB. They put those together with an FM license in Atkins, Arkansas, and successfully obtained the construction permit from the FCC in April 1998. That station eventually became KVLD-FM.

Moellers became station manager of KVOM AM-FM in 2000. The KVOM stations were purchased (along with the other River Valley Radio stations) in June 2003 by Max Media, LLC, based in Virginia Beach, Virginia. Management of the two operations was eventually consolidated and Moellers became manager of the current cluster. In January 2014, ownership transferred to East Arkansas Broadcasters. KVOM-AM, KVOM-FM and KVLD-FM (now KCON-FM) became EAB of Morrilton, LLC and Moellers was named Market Manager. The remaining stations in the cluster, KCJC-FM, KWKK-FM and KCAB became EAB of Russellville, LLC.
