= KVOM-FM =

- Morrilton, Arkansas; United States
- Frequency: 101.7 MHz
- Branding: The Voice of Morrilton

Programming
- Format: Country music
- Affiliations: ABC News Radio

Ownership
- Owner: Bobby Caldwell; (EAB of Morrilton, LLC)
- Sister stations: KCAB, KASR, KCON, KVOM, KCJC, KWKK, KYEL

History
- First air date: 1980
- Call sign meaning: Voice Of Morrilton

Technical information
- Licensing authority: FCC
- Facility ID: 43831
- Class: A
- ERP: 6,000 watts
- HAAT: 69 meters (226 ft)
- Transmitter coordinates: 35°09′28″N 92°46′04″W

Links
- Public license information: Public file; LMS
- Webcast: Listen live
- Website: kvom.com

KVOM-FM (101.7 MHz) is a radio station airing a country music format, licensed to Morrilton, Arkansas. The station is owned by Bobby Caldwell's East Arkansas Broadcasters, through licensee EAB of Morrilton, LLC.

KVOM-FM broadcasts country music and locally produced programs such as "NewsWatch" and "Trading Time." NewsWatch airs at 7:30 am and 4:45 pm weekdays and 7:30 am and noon on Saturdays. Trading Time airs at 8:30 am Monday through Saturday. The station also broadcasts Morrilton High School football and basketball games and Sacred Heart High School basketball games, as well as Arkansas Razorback football and basketball games and Oaklawn horse racing results.
