= Egypt Mills, Missouri =

Unincorporated community in Missouri, U.S.

Coordinates: 37°24′18″N 89°27′49″W

Egypt Mills is an unincorporated community in Randol Township in eastern Cape Girardeau County, Missouri, United States. It is located approximately 12 miles east of Jackson.

Egypt Mills is part of the Cape Girardeau–Jackson, MO-IL Metropolitan Statistical Area.

In June 1821, a Baptist church called Ebenezer was constituted in the Big Bend near the present site of Egypt Mills. A post office was established in 1889, which operated until 1934. Tradition has it that the name originated from a zealous school teacher who organized a Sunday school class which met in an old mill located here. One of the first lessons dealt with Egypt, so the place came to be known as Egypt Mills. Trinity Lutheran church was dedicated in 1881 by pastor H. Guemmer.
