= Southern Illinois Salukis =

Athletic program of Southern Illinois University Carbondale

- University: Southern Illinois University
- Nickname: Salukis
- NCAA: Division I (FCS)
- Conference: Missouri Valley Conference (primary); Missouri Valley Football Conference
- Athletic director: Tim Leonard
- Location: Carbondale, Illinois
- Varsity teams: 16 (8 men's and 8 women's)
- Football stadium: Saluki Stadium
- Basketball arena: Banterra Center
- Other venues: Davies Gym
- Colors: Maroon and white
- Mascot: Brown Dawg & Gray Dawg
- Fight song: Go Southern Go!
- Website: siusalukis.com

The Southern Illinois Salukis are the varsity athletic teams representing Southern Illinois University Carbondale. The nickname comes from the Saluki, the Royal Dog of Egypt and the Persian greyhound, which ties into the fact that southern Illinois has had the nickname "Little Egypt" for just under 200 years.

The Salukis play their home basketball games at Banterra Center and football games at Saluki Stadium.

Southern Illinois University was a member of the Illinois Intercollegiate Athletic Conference from 1913 to 1962. The school is currently a member of the Missouri Valley Conference in most sports. The football team is a member of the Division I Football Championship Subdivision Missouri Valley Football Conference.

== Mascot ==
SIU's sports mascot is the Saluki. A Saluki is one of the oldest dog breeds, dating back over 6000 years and is an Egyptian hunting dog. They are sight hounds and can run in excess of 42 mph. The greyhound, afghan, borzoi and whippet are derived from Saluki. SIU's teams originally competed under the team name "Maroons" from 1913 to 1951. Then the Saluki was chosen as SIU's mascot on March 19, 1951, in part because the southern Illinois region is colloquially known as Little Egypt.

== Sports sponsored ==
Men's sports	Women's sports
Baseball	Basketball
Basketball	Cross country
Cross country	Golf
Football	Softball
Golf	Swimming and diving
Swimming and diving	Track and field^{1}
Track and field^{1}	Volleyball
^{1} – Track and field includes both indoor and outdoor

Missouri Valley Conference's logo in SIU's colors

A member of the Missouri Valley Conference, Southern Illinois University Carbondale currently sponsors 16 sports—eight each for men and women—in NCAA-sanctioned competition. The most recent change to the roster of SIU sports came at the end of the 2016–17 school year, when the school dropped men's and women's tennis.

=== Men's basketball ===
The school athletics may be best known for the men's basketball program. Success for the Salukis has been recent and historical. SIU advanced to six consecutive NCAA Tournaments (2002–2007), advancing to two Sweet 16s and accruing an NCAA Tournament record of 5–6 during that time. SIU is also the 1967 NIT Champions led by NBA Hall of Famer Walt Frazier.

Chris Lowery was the coach of the Salukis and led the team to the NCAA tournament every year from the 2004–05 season through the 2006–07 season, where they made an appearance in the Sweet Sixteen. He was let go from the school following the 2011–2012 season. On March 28, 2012, Barry Hinson was named head coach.

=== Football ===
SIU competes in the NCAA Football Championship Subdivision (formerly known as 1-AA) in the Missouri Valley Football Conference. SIU has been ranked in the Top-20 of the FCS Coaches Poll for 54 straight weeks. The Salukis have won 40 games since 2003, ranking 12th in Division 1 football during that time span. The team is coached by head coach Nick Hill, a former assistant coach and quarterback for the Salukis.

SIU Football has won numerous conference championship and in 1983 The Salukis won the NCAA Division I-AA Champions, with a 43–7 win over Western Carolina.

=== Men's gymnastics ===
SIU's also had a men's gymnastics team until the program was canceled in 1989. From 1956 until the program was canceled, Bill Meade was the coach of the team. During that time the program turned out 55 NCAA All-Americans and 15 NCAA Individual National Champions while winning four NCAA Division I championships in 1964, 1966, 1967, and 1972. The Men's Gymnastics program also holds the longest winning streak of any SIU program winning 68 consecutive meets from 1961 to 1968.

=== Softball ===
SIU's softball team has appeared in four Women's College World Series, in 1970, 1971, 1977 and 1978.

== National team championships ==
As of July 2, 2014, Southern Illinois has won 5 Division I and 3 Division II NCAA national championships:

Division I

- Men's:
  - Gymnastics (4): 1964, 1966, 1967, 1972
  - Football (1): 1983

Division II

- Men's:
  - Men's Cross Country: 1961
  - Golf: 1964
  - Tennis: 1964

The following 3 national championships were not bestowed by the NCAA:

- Women's
  - Gymnastics : 1970, 1974, 1975 (AIAW)

== Facilities ==
=== Saluki Way ===
On September 9, 2005, the plans for Saluki Way were unveiled by Chancellor Walter Wendler. The plan called for the construction of a new football stadium, renovation of SIU Arena (Now the Banterra Center), a new track and field complex, renovation and new additions of academic buildings, a remodeled Morris Library, and other campus improvements.

==== Saluki Stadium ====
SIU Football plays at the new 15,000-seat Saluki Stadium, which replaces McAndrew Stadium. The new stadium was part of the university's larger athletic facilities plan, "Saluki Way," to renovate and restructure the campus athletic facilities.

Saluki Stadium opened on September 2, 2010, when a sellout crowd of 15,200 watched the Salukis defeat Quincy 70–7. The new football stadium is currently named Saluki Stadium. As of right now, no official naming rights have been sold.

==== Banterra Center ====
Banterra Center is an 8,339-seat arena on the SIU campus; it is the home of Saluki men's and women's basketball teams. The arena underwent a renovation as a part of Saluki Way. Known as the SIU Arena from 1964 to 2019, Banterra Bank purchased the naming rights for $4 million over ten years, with an option to extend the contract for an additional ten years for an additional $6 million.

==== Troutt-Wittman Center ====
The Troutt-Wittmann Academic and Training Center, a facility to give Saluki athletes the opportunity to gain help with their studies, as well as train and condition, was built with a donation by SIU alumnus and former Saluki football player Thomas Wittmann.

== See also ==
- Saluki Sports Network
- Marching Salukis
