= KASR =

Simulcast with KYEL Danville
- Atkins, Arkansas; United States
- Broadcast area: Russellville, Arkansas
- Frequency: 99.3 MHz
- Branding: 99.3/105.5 The Eagle

Programming
- Format: Classic rock
- Affiliations: Westwood One

Ownership
- Owner: Bobby Caldwell; (EAB of Morrilton, LLC)
- Sister stations: KCAB, KCJC, KCON, KVOM, KVOM-FM, KWKK, KYEL

History
- First air date: October 1999 (as KRRD)
- Former call signs: KBHY (1998); KRRD (1998–2002); KVLD (2002–2015); KCON (2015–2021)
- Call sign meaning: "Arkansas Sports Radio", from former home at 92.7

Technical information
- Licensing authority: FCC
- Facility ID: 77279
- Class: A
- ERP: 4,100 watts
- HAAT: 120 meters (390 ft)
- Transmitter coordinates: 35°14′39″N 92°52′51″W

Links
- Public license information: Public file; LMS
- Webcast: Listen Live
- Website: 993theeagle.com

KASR (99.3 FM 99.3/105.5 The Eagle) is a radio station airing a classic rock format licensed to serve Atkins, Arkansas. The station serves the Morrilton, Arkansas, area and is owned by Bobby Caldwell's East Arkansas Broadcasters, through licensee EAB of Morrilton, LLC.

In 2021, EAB purchased 92.7 FM in Vilonia for $525,000. With no change in format or imaging, the call letters were switched with the new acquisition in August 2021, placing the KCON designation closer to Conway and moving the KASR call letters to the Atkins stations.
