= WBZB =

- Murray, Kentucky; United States
- Frequency: 1130 kHz
- Branding: The Busy Bee

Programming
- Format: Top 40 (CHR)

Ownership
- Owner: Forever Communications, Inc.

History
- First air date: 1976; 50 years ago
- Former call signs: WSJP (1976–2000); WRKY (2000–2006); WJGY (2006–2007); WOFC (2007–2016)
- Call sign meaning: Busy Bee

Technical information
- Licensing authority: FCC
- Facility ID: 73270
- Class: D
- Power: 1,500 watts day
- Transmitter coordinates: 36°38′08″N 88°19′10″W
- Translator: 104.5 W283CP (Murray)

Links
- Public license information: Public file; LMS

WBZB (1130 AM) is a daytime only radio station broadcasting a top 40 (CHR) format, licensed to Murray, Kentucky. The station is currently owned by Forever Communications, Inc. and features programming from ESPN Radio.

== History ==
The station went on the air September 12, 1978, as WSJP, owned by father-and-son businessmen Joe and Sam Parker. After merging with WNBS and the FM station now known as WFGS, they sold the stations to Forever Communications. It marked the first time that ownership of all of Murray's commercial broadcasters lay with an out-of-town company. WSJP and WNBS swapped formats and schedules in 2000 to take advantage of the better nighttime signal on WNBS.

The call sign for 1130 was changed to WRKY and then to WJGY before becoming WOFC on January 11, 2007. This was originally a reference to the station's adult contemporary format, designed to be music that could be played in an office without distracting from work. Although the station reverted to sports talk a year later, the call letters did not immediately change. The station changed its call sign to the current WBZB on November 23, 2016.

The call letters of WSJP coincided with the initials of co-founder Sammy Joe Parker, although the station's official claim was that it stood for its moniker "We Serve the Jackson Purchase".

On March 24, 2017, WBZB changed its format from sports to contemporary hit radio, branded as "The Busy Bee".
