= KGKS =

Radio station in Scott City, Missouri

- Scott City, Missouri; United States
- Broadcast area: Cape Girardeau, Missouri
- Frequency: 93.9 MHz
- Branding: 93.9 Mike FM

Programming
- Format: Adult hits
- Affiliations: Citadel Media

Ownership
- Owner: Max Media; (River Radio LLC)

History
- First air date: 1999

Technical information
- Licensing authority: FCC
- Facility ID: 78626
- Class: C3
- ERP: 16,500 watts
- HAAT: 124 meters (407 ft)
- Transmitter coordinates: 37°21′34″N 89°37′16″W

Links
- Public license information: Public file; LMS
- Webcast: Listen live
- Website: 939mikefm.com

KGKS (93.9 FM, "Mike FM") is a radio station broadcasting an adult hits music format. Licensed to Scott City, Missouri, United States, the station is currently owned by Max Media through River Radio LLC and features programming from Citadel Media.

== History ==
The Federal Communications Commission issued a construction permit for the station to Zimmer Radio of Mid-Missouri, Inc. on April 16, 1998. The station was issued the KGKS call sign on June 29, 1998, and received its license to cover on January 14, 1999. On June 2, 2004, the station's license was assigned by Zimmer Radio to the current owner, River Radio. Included in the transaction were the licenses for Missouri stations KCGQ-FM, KGIR, KJEZ, KKLR-FM, KLSC, KMAL, KSIM, KWOC, and KZIM.

Previously carrying a longtime classic hits format as "93.9 The River", the station, following the end of the station's annual Christmas music stunt at Midnight on December 26, 2021, flipped to an adult hits format as "93.9 Mike FM". The first song on Mike was "Jack and Diane" by John Cougar Mellencamp, and the format launched with a commercial-free run of 9,300 minutes, lasting through the following Sunday, January 2. The station retains a majority of their previous playlist as well as The River's DJs (a particularly unique move as most adult hits stations are known for their jockless programming), but expanded it to the typical adult hits boundaries to include songs more recent, from the mid-1990s onward.
