= WCIL-FM =

- Carbondale, Illinois; United States
- Broadcast area: Marion–Carbondale, Illinois
- Frequency: 101.5 MHz
- Branding: 101.5 CIL-FM

Programming
- Format: Contemporary hit radio
- Affiliations: Premiere Networks; Saluki Radio Network

Ownership
- Owner: Max Media; (River Radio LLC)
- Sister stations: WCIL, WUEZ, WJPF, WOOZ-FM, WXLT

History
- First air date: 1968
- Call sign meaning: Carbondale, Illinois

Technical information
- Licensing authority: FCC
- Facility ID: 65949
- Class: B
- ERP: 28,500 watts
- HAAT: 199.0 meters (652.9 ft)
- Transmitter coordinates: 37°42′4.00″N 89°22′18.00″W

Links
- Public license information: Public file; LMS
- Webcast: Listen live
- Website: cilfm.com

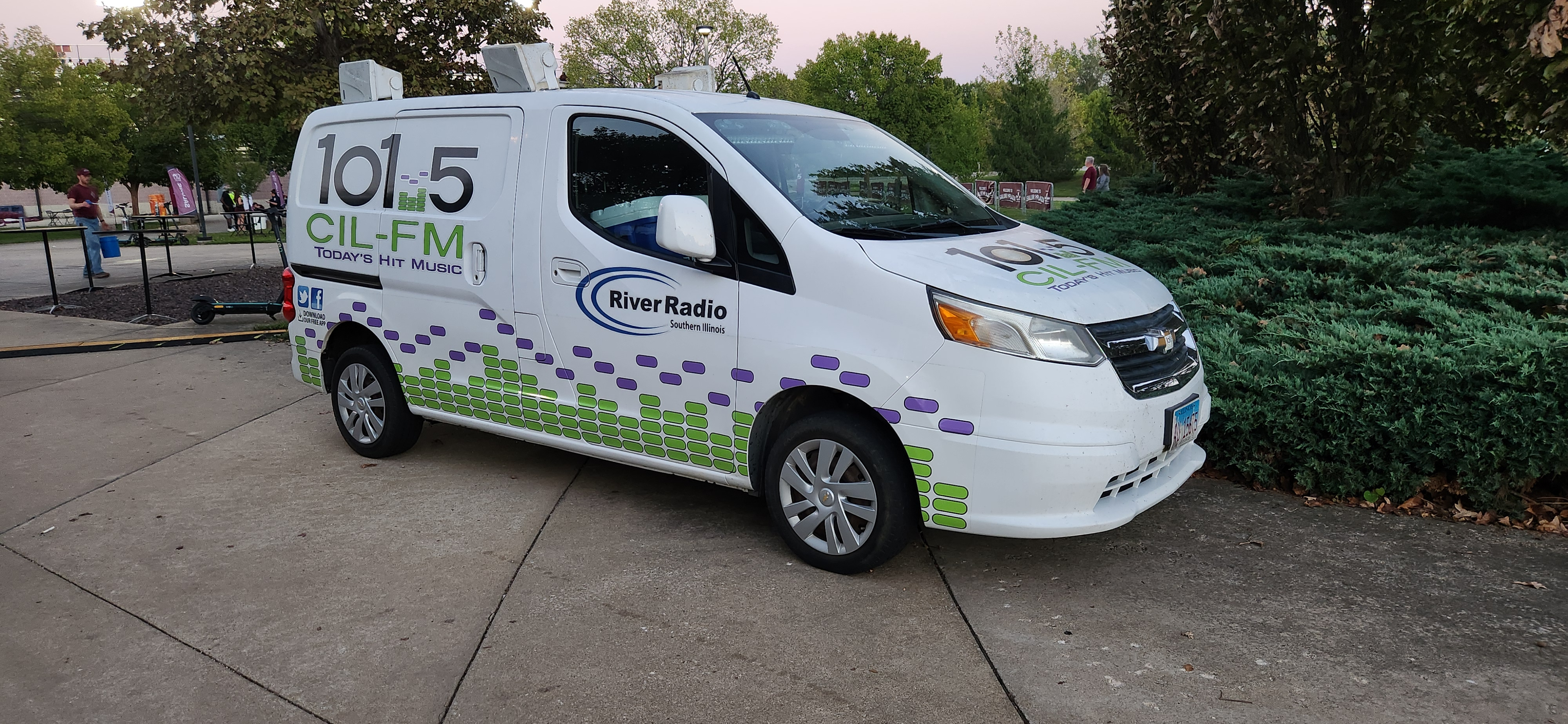
A promotional vehicle used by WCIL-FM

WCIL-FM (101.5 FM) is a radio station broadcasting a contemporary hit radio format. Licensed to Carbondale, Illinois, the station serves the Marion-Carbondale area. The station is currently owned by Max Media.

== History ==
WCIL-AM Signed on the air in 1946 as a daytime-only station with personalities such as Jimmy Bowen, Bluegrass Roy and others in a second floor studio at about 215 W. Main St. in Carbondale. At that time to get the AM license they were pressured by the FCC to also sign on an FM station. They kept the FM on the air for about a year and then signed it off the air since but at that time, nobody listened to FM. So in 1964 Paul F. McRoy WCIL's then owner foresaw the potential of FM and applied for a new FM license. The license was approved and WCIL-FM signed on in 1968 and allowed broadcasting after local sunset when WCIL was required to sign off. WCIL-AM And WCIL-FM simulcast the same programming on both stations. The format was easy listening music and news. A Year before WCIL-FM was "officially" born Top 40 music was played at night after 10:00. The FCC required AM-FM simulcasts to split programming. So the plans were made to split both WCIL-AM and WCIL-FM. The AM and FM split programming and became separate stations on August the 16th of 1976. Before this split of the stations, WCIL-FM would sign off the air at 2:00 AM and would sign back on the air at 6:00 AM. So once both of the stations have legally split "Rockin' Radio! The New 'CIL-FM" has finally been born. It was on the air 24 hours a day and never signed off since except for technical problems. Mr. McRoy would go on to sell both WCIL-AM and WCIL-FM to Dennis Lyle now the president of the Illinois Broadcasters Association.

WCIL-FM dominated ratings in the heyday of Top 40/CHR radio. The "Rockin' Radio! 'CIL-FM" air personalities were well known throughout the area. In both the 1980s and the 1990s the station was led by WCIL-FM's Program Director and DJ Tony Waitekus propelled the station to national prominence.

It was announced in July 2018, that WCIL-FM would return as the radio home for Southern Illinois University Men's basketball and football. WCIL-FM was the first radio for Saluki Athletics starting in the late 1970s lasting for several years. The radio voice of the Salukis for football, & Men's basketball is Mike Reis. The color commentator for football is Gene Green, and for men's basketball it is Greg Starrick.

On August the 16th of 2021, WCIL-FM celebrated their 45th anniversary.

== Ownership ==
In 1997 Dennis Lyle sold the stations to the Zimmer Radio Group. But soon after the sale WCIL-FM had a 1997 relaunch from the legendary "Rockin' Radio!" era to the current "Today's Hit Music" era.

But then all of a sudden in 2004 Zimmer Radio Group sold their stations in southern Illinois (including WCIL-FM) along with Cape Girardeau Poplar Bluff and Sikeston Missouri to River Radio a subsidiary of Max Media LLC. The reported value of this 17-station transaction was $43 million.
