= KJEZ =

- Poplar Bluff, Missouri; United States
- Broadcast area: Poplar Bluff, Missouri; Dexter, Missouri
- Frequency: 95.5 MHz
- Branding: Z95, The Bone

Programming
- Format: Classic rock

Ownership
- Owner: Max Media; (River Radio LLC)
- Sister stations: KKLR-FM, KWOC

History
- First air date: 1977

Technical information
- Licensing authority: FCC
- Facility ID: 365
- Class: C1
- ERP: 100,000 watts
- HAAT: 125 meters (410 ft)
- Transmitter coordinates: 36°50′50″N 90°19′53″W

Links
- Public license information: Public file; LMS
- Webcast: Listen live
- Website: z95thebone.net

KJEZ (95.5 FM) is a radio station airing a classic rock format licensed to Poplar Bluff, Missouri. The station is owned by Max Media, through licensee River Radio LLC.
