= KWOC =

Radio station in Poplar Bluff, Missouri

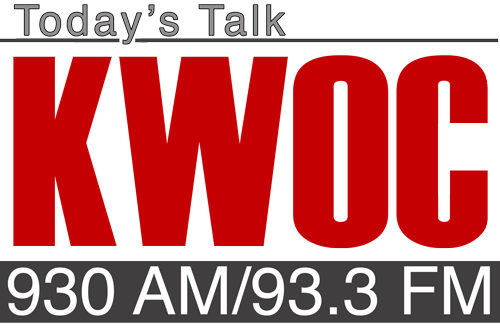
- Poplar Bluff, Missouri; United States
- Frequency: 930 kHz
- Branding: News/Talk 930

Programming
- Language: English
- Format: News/Talk
- Affiliations: Citadel Media, Westwood One, CBS Radio

Ownership
- Owner: Max Media; (River Radio LLC)
- Sister stations: KJEZ, KKLR-FM

History
- First air date: May 10, 1938

Technical information
- Licensing authority: FCC
- Facility ID: 6015
- Class: B
- Power: 5,000 watts (day); 42 watts (night)
- Transmitter coordinates: 36°43′16.2″N 90°22′11.4″W
- Translator: 93.3 FM (K227BK)

Links
- Public license information: Public file; LMS
- Webcast: Listen Live
- Website: kwoc.com

KWOC (930 AM, "News/Talk 930") is an American radio station licensed to serve the community of Poplar Bluff, Missouri. The station, established in 1938, is currently owned by Max Media's River Radio and the broadcast license is held by MRR License LLC.

It broadcasts a news/talk radio format. Syndicated programming includes Coast to Coast AM with George Noory, The Osgood File with Charles Osgood, The Dave Ramsey Show, The Rush Limbaugh Show, The Sean Hannity Show, The Glenn Beck Program, and The Mike Gallagher Show.

The station was assigned the call sign "KWOC" by the Federal Communications Commission (FCC).
