= Wrap =

Wrap, WRAP or Wrapped may refer to:

== Storage and preservation ==
- Gift wrap or wrap paper, used to enclose a present
- Overwrap, a wrapping of items in a package or a wrapping over packages
- Plastic wrap, a thin, clear, flexible plastic used to cover food
- Shrink wrap, a polymer used to bundle boxes on a pallet for transport
- Vehicle wrap, a coloured polymer used to cover a car's paintwork, for advertising purposes or as a cost-effective alternative to a re-spray

== Arts, entertainment, and media ==
=== Filmmaking ===
- Wrap (filmmaking), the end of filming on a movie set
  - "That's a wrap!", an idiom often used by a director on a film set

=== Music ===
- wRAP (album), 2002 album from Finnish rapper Kana
- "Wrapped" (Gloria Estefan song), the lead single from Gloria Estefan's album Unwrapped
- "Wrapped" (Bruce Robison song), a Bruce Robison song; covered by Kelly Willis in 1998 and George Strait in 2006
- Spotify Wrapped, viral marketing campaign by Spotify

=== Radio ===
- WRAP (Florida), defunct Central Florida, USA radio station, which held the WRAP call sign from 1922 until 1923,
- WVXX Norfolk Virginia, USA radio station, which operated under the WRAP call sign from 1952 until 1954
- WTAR Norfolk Virginia, USA radio station, which held the WRAP call sign from 1954 until 1987
- WGPL Portsmouth Virginia, USA radio station, which held the WRAP call sign from 1987 until 1989
- WRAP (Norfolk), review of three Hampton Roads, Virginia, USA radio stations which operated with the WRAP call sign and related format from 1952 until 1989.

=== Other arts, entertainment, and media ===
- Gallery wrap, a method of mounting an artist's canvas onto a frame
- Line wrap and word wrap, how text is continued onto the next line
- Wrapped (magazine), an alternative lifestyle magazine from Africa
- TheWrap, American news website

== Marketing and finance ==
- Wrap account, a financial product/platform in which a brokerage manages an investor's portfolio for a flat quarterly or annual fee
- Wrap advertising, a method of advertising on vehicles
- Service wrap, a set of non-core services which are bundled with a core service

== Organisations ==
- Waste & Resources Action Programme, a nonprofit organisation in the United Kingdom
- Worldwide Responsible Accredited Production, a not-for-profit organization in the United States

== Products and services ==
- Wrap (clothing), a skirt-like garment
- Wrap (food), a food item where an outer shell is wrapped around another food item, often a standard sandwich filling or vegetables
- Mud wrap, a type of spa treatment

== Technology ==
- .wrap, computer video file format
- Web Resource Authorization Protocol, an IETF draft for the OAuth protocol; see User-Managed Access
- Wireless Router Application Platform, a very small form factor personal computer
- Wire wrap, electric/electronic connections

== Other uses ==
- Wellness Recovery Action Plan, a therapeutic method and series of self-help books

== See also ==
- Cover (disambiguation)
- Enclose (disambiguation)
- Rap (disambiguation)
- Rapt (disambiguation)
- Wrapper (disambiguation)
- Wrapping (disambiguation)
- Wraparound (disambiguation)
