= WNOH =

Soft adult contemporary radio station in Windsor–Norfolk, Virginia

- Windsor, Virginia; United States
- Broadcast area: Hampton Roads; Northeastern North Carolina
- Frequency: 105.3 MHz (HD Radio)
- Branding: 105.3 The Breeze

Programming
- Format: Soft adult contemporary
- Subchannels: HD2: K-Love (Contemporary Christian)

Ownership
- Owner: iHeartMedia; (iHM Licenses, LLC)
- Sister stations: WHBT-FM, WMOV-FM, WOWI

History
- First air date: August 3, 1962 (as WXRI)
- Former call signs: WXRI (1962–1989); WZCL (1989–1990); WMXN (1990–1995); WJCD (1995–2001); WSVY-FM (2001–2004); WKUS (2004–2010); WVMA (2010–2013)
- Call sign meaning: Now Hampton Roads (former branding)

Technical information
- Licensing authority: FCC
- Facility ID: 69570
- Class: B
- ERP: 50,000 watts
- HAAT: 150 meters (490 ft)
- Transmitter coordinates: 36°48′43.0″N 76°27′45.0″W
- Translators: HD2: 93.3 W227BR (Portsmouth); HD2: 97.9 W250BQ (Newport News)

Links
- Public license information: Public file; LMS
- Webcast: WNOH Webstream
- Website: 1053thebreeze.iheart.com

WNOH (105.3 FM) is a commercial radio station licensed to Windsor, Virginia, serving the Hampton Roads radio market in Virginia and Northeastern North Carolina. WNOH is owned and operated by iHeartMedia and broadcasts a Soft adult contemporary music format, branded as "105.3 The Breeze". WNOH is the Hampton Roads affiliate for the syndicated Delilah show, which airs during the evening.

WNOH's studios and offices are on Greenbrier in Chesapeake, Virginia. The transmitter is off Nansemond Parkway in Suffolk, Virginia. WNOH broadcasts at 50,000 watts, the maximum power for the Hampton Roads section of Virginia, although a few FM stations in the market are powered at 100,000 watts if their towers are located near or over the North Carolina state line. (WGH-FM is grandfathered at 74,000 watts).

WNOH broadcasts in the HD Radio format; its HD2 subchannel carries "K-Love", a contemporary Christian format from the Educational Media Foundation. Sometime in 2022, Master of the Mix was pulled from iHeartRadio, leading to the HD2 channel being turned off; the HD3 subchannel remained on before being turned off as the HD3 format moved to HD2.

== History ==
=== Early years as WXRI ===
On August 3, 1962, WXRI signed on the air on 104.5 MHz, licensed to Norfolk. It was owned by the Christian Broadcasting Network, headed by Pat Robertson, and carried a Christian radio format for 27 years, but it started with an antiquated 3,000-watt transmitter located in an abandoned garage. A year after signing on, it was approved to move to its present 105.3 MHz and increased its transmitter power to 50,000 watts. CBN, then headquartered in Portsmouth, also owned WYAH-TV (channel 27, now WGNT), and the two stations shared studio facilities on Spratley Street in Portsmouth.

In 1981, the format was modified to what was described as a "sanitized secular format" in preparation for planned syndication throughout the U.S. by CBN's Continental Radio division. The format mixed Christian contemporary songs with adult contemporary, avoiding overt proselytism of religious views.

=== Oldies WZCL and smooth jazz WJCD ===
The 1989 sale of WXRI to Win Communications severed CBN's ties to the station and prompted the station's call sign to change to WZCL. The Christian format initially moved to 96.1 WKSV, which received CBN's music library, hired most of its former DJs and even considered changing its call letters to WXRI. WZCL went through a period of stunting with everything from album rock to beautiful music. On May 19, the new WZCL became "Cool 105" with an oldies format. On September 3, 1990, after briefly stunting with country music, WZCL became adult contemporary-formatted WMXN, "Mix 105".

In 1995, ML Media Opportunity Partners sold WMXN to US Radio L.P., which owned WSVY and WOWI. The following year, WMXN and co-owned WOWI were acquired by Clear Channel Communications, a forerunner to current owner iHeartMedia, Inc. Clear Channel switched the format to smooth Jazz as WJCD on March 17, 1995. On June 25, 2001, WJCD and sister WSVY-FM swapped formats and call letters, with smooth jazz WJCD moving to 107.7 FM, while WSVY's urban AC format moved to 105.3, and rebranded as "Vibe 105.3". On March 19, 2004, WSVY rebranded as "105.3 Kiss FM", and on March 29, the station became WKUS.

=== Urban AC WKUS and classic hits WVMA ===
On October 11, 2010, WKUS' urban AC format moved from 105.3 to the 92.1 and 107.7 signals to make room for the launch of WVMA, an AC-leaning classic hits format as "Magic 105.3". The move meant the end of the oldies format on 92.1 and the smooth jazz format on 107.7.

On April 5, 2012, WVMA changed their format to contemporary hit radio, branded as "The New 105.3".

=== Top 40 and alternative WNOH ===
On January 25, 2013, WVMA rebranded as "Now 105.3". Ten days later, WVMA shortened the branding to "Now 105". On March 11, 2013, the station changed its call sign to the current WNOH. WNOH primarily competed with WNVZ and WVHT.

On October 31, 2017, at midnight, after playing "Let Me Love You" by DJ Snake, WNOH began stunting with a loop of "Thriller" by Michael Jackson. At 2 p.m. that day, WNOH flipped to alternative rock, branded as "Alt 105.3". The syndicated programs moved to WVHT. The first song on "Alt" was "Feel It Still" by Portugal. The Man. The station primarily competed against Sinclair Communications-owned WROX-FM, as well as Saga Communications' active rock-formatted WNOR.

=== BIN: Black Information Network ===
Logo as "Norfolk's BIN 105.3"

On June 29, 2020, fifteen iHeart stations in markets with large African American populations, including WNOH, began stunting with African American speeches, interspersed with messages such as "Our Voices Will Be Heard" and "Our side of the story is about to be told," with a new format slated to launch the following day at noon. At the promised time, WNOH, along with the other fourteen stations, became the launch stations for the Black Information Network, an African American-oriented all-news radio network. WNOH was the only full-power FM affiliate of the network.

=== Soft AC ===
On July 25, 2025, the Black Information Network format moved to WHBT-FM (92.1 FM), while 105.3 began stunting with Christmas music as "Christmas 105.3". This stunting lasted for the last week of July as the station temporarily branded as "Hampton Roads' Christmas Station." The week of Christmas music concluded on August 1, at midnight, when WNOH officially switched to a soft adult contemporary format and rebranded as "105.3 The Breeze."

With the change, a new lineup of radio DJs were added, including the syndicated Murphy, Sam, and Jodi Show in mornings, and the syndicated Delilah in evenings.

==== Christmas Music ====
On November 1, 2025, WNOH flipped to Christmas music again, this time, retaining the "105.3 the Breeze" branding. This picks up iHeart's yearly tradition of putting Christmas music on one of their radio stations in Norfolk. Prior to this year, WMOV-FM flipped to all-Christmas music annually, but the station changed formats after the 2024 holiday season, and now no longer flip to Christmas music. The Christmas music on WNOH also competes against Audacy-owned WWDE-FM, which flips to Christmas music every year.
