= WMOV-FM =

- Norfolk, Virginia; United States
- Broadcast area: Hampton Roads
- Frequency: 107.7 MHz (HD Radio)
- Branding: Party 107.7

Programming
- Language: English
- Format: Contemporary hit radio
- Affiliations: Premiere Networks

Ownership
- Owner: iHeartMedia; (iHM Licenses, LLC)
- Sister stations: WHBT-FM; WNOH; WOWI

History
- First air date: April 13, 1990
- Former call signs: WXRI (1990–1992); WBSK-FM (1992–1993); WSVY-FM (1993–2001); WJCD (2001–2010); WKUS (2010–2011)
- Call sign meaning: Former "Movin" branding

Technical information
- Licensing authority: FCC
- Facility ID: 31123
- Class: B1
- ERP: 15,000 watts
- HAAT: 130 meters (430 ft)
- Transmitter coordinates: 36°48′37.0″N 76°16′58.7″W

Links
- Public license information: Public file; LMS
- Webcast: Listen live (via iHeartRadio)
- Website: party1077.iheart.com

WMOV-FM (107.7 FM, "Party 107.7") is a commercial radio station in Norfolk, Virginia, serving Hampton Roads. It carries an adult-leaning contemporary hit radio format and is owned by iHeartMedia. The studios and offices are in Greenbrier.

The transmitter tower is on Poindexter Street in Chesapeake, near the Elizabeth River and Interstate 464. WMOV-FM broadcasts using HD Radio technology. Its HD2 digital subchannel formerly ran the soft rock format of the iHeartRadio Cafe. The HD3 subchannel formerly carried iHeart's soft adult contemporary music service "The Breeze".

== History ==
=== WXRI-FM ===
On April 13, 1990, the station signed on as WXRI-FM. It was owned by J.H. Communications, taking the call sign of the former station on 105.3 MHz that had been owned by televangelist Pat Robertson until its sale in May 1989. It initially broadcast a business format from the Business Radio Network.

The station stunting with Christmas music and then relaunched on Christmas day with the contemporary Christian music format of the previous WXRI. That ended when its parent company entered into an agreement in May 1992, to simulcast the music of WBSK, an urban contemporary station that was co-owned with WOWI.

=== WSVY ===
On May 8, 1993, WBSK-FM changed its call sign to WSVY, and shifted to an urban adult contemporary format.

In July 1997, WSVY began simulcasting with 92.1 FM as "Vibe 107.7 and 92.1".

By March 1999, WSVY shifted to the then-popular Jammin' oldies format, which evolved back to urban AC. On June 25, 2001, WSVY and sister WJCD swapped formats and call letters, with the urban AC "Vibe" format moving to 105.3 FM, while WJCD's smooth jazz format moved to 107.7.

=== WJCD ===
On March 1, 2004, WJCD flipped to adult contemporary as "Lite FM", and resumed its simulcast with 92.1, which dropped its urban format. 92.1 would drop out of the simulcast again on August 12, 2005, when it flipped to oldies as WCDG.

On December 26, 2006, WJCD flipped back to smooth jazz as "Smooth Jazz 107.7".

=== WKUS ===
On October 11, 2010, WJCD and WCDG became simulcasts again when WKUS moved from 105.3 to 107.7 and the 105.3 frequency became "Magic 105.3" with an AC-themed classic hits format. The move meant the end for WJCD's smooth jazz format and WCDG's oldies format. On October 27, 2010, WJCD changed their call letters to WKUS.

On March 31, 2011, at 3 p.m., WKUS broke away from its simulcast of WKSA and flipped to rhythmic adult contemporary, branded as "MOViN' 107.7". The first song on "MOViN'" was "Get Ready for This" by 2 Unlimited.

=== WMOV-FM ===
On April 7, 2011, WKUS changed its call letters to WMOV-FM to match the new format. (The FM suffix is required because there is a WMOV on the AM dial in Ravenswood, West Virginia, with a different owner).

On November 2, 2012, WMOV-FM began to stunting with Christmas music as "Christmas 107.7", suggesting a possible format change. This did not occur, and it returned to its regular format on December 26. It has continued switching to Christmas music every Mid-November to late December, ever since.

As of October 2018, WMOV-FM began patterning itself after sister station WKTU New York City with an emphasis on rhythmic pop/dance music.

The station now competes with WVBW-FM 100.5, which flipped to urban adult contemporary in June 2022.

WMOV-FM had switched to Christmas music for most of November and December, beginning in 2013. With the competition from WVBW-FM, it stopped going all-Christmas in 2023. But in 2024, it returned to Christmas music, flipping earlier than most stations, at the beginning of November. On December 26, 2024, WMOV-FM became gold-based CHR as Party 107-7.

WMOV-FM Logo during Christmas music format from 2013 to 2022, and again in 2024

In June 2026, as part of a strategy of moving several stations from local to national music logs, WMOV-FM shifted to an adult-leaning mainstream CHR direction, running the national "Kiss" network, retaining the "Party" branding. This returns mainstream CHR music to the Norfolk market; the last carrier of the format, WNVZ (which skews younger listeners), shifted to a rhythmic direction in the summer of 2023 (and historically, has had a rhythmic lean before then).

== HD Radio ==
On WMOV-FM's HD Radio digital subchannel, its HD2 service originated "The iHeartRadio Café", a format consisting of soft rock from the 1970s and 1980s, and "yacht rock" music, much of it from singer-songwriters such as Billy Joel, Carly Simon, James Taylor and Carole King. It is heard nationally through the iHeartRadio app. The HD2 channel was dropped on October 1, 2022.

The HD3 subchannel carried iHeart's "The Breeze" soft adult contemporary music service. That was also dropped in 2022.
