= WKOC =

WKOC may refer to:

- WKOC-LP, a defunct low-power radio station (103.1 FM) formerly licensed to serve Ider, Alabama, United States
- WNOB, a radio station (93.7 FM) licensed to serve Chesapeake, Virginia, United States, which used the call sign WKOC from July 1991 to December 2003
- WUSH, a radio station (106.1 FM) licensed to serve Poquoson, Virginia, which used the call sign WKOC from December 2003 to February 2004
