= WOWI =

Radio station in Norfolk, Virginia

- Norfolk, Virginia; United States
- Broadcast area: Hampton Roads; Northeastern North Carolina
- Frequency: 102.9 MHz (HD Radio)
- Branding: 103 Jamz

Programming
- Format: Mainstream urban
- Affiliations: Premiere Networks

Ownership
- Owner: iHeartMedia; (iHM Licenses, LLC)
- Sister stations: WHBT-FM, WMOV-FM, WNOH

History
- First air date: June 6, 1948; 78 years ago
- Former call signs: WRVC (1948–70); WOWI-FM (1970–71)
- Call sign meaning: former brand name "Wowee"

Technical information
- Facility ID: 69558
- Class: B
- ERP: 50,000 watts
- HAAT: 150 meters (490 ft)
- Transmitter coordinates: 36°45′23.0″N 76°23′6.0″W

Links
- Webcast: Listen Live
- Website: 103jamz.iheart.com

WOWI (102.9 FM) – branded 103 Jamz – is a commercial mainstream urban radio station licensed to Norfolk, Virginia. Owned by iHeartMedia, the station services Hampton Roads and Northeastern North Carolina, and is the local affiliate for The Breakfast Club. The WOWI studios and transmitter are located in Chesapeake. Besides a standard analog transmission, WOWI broadcasts in HD Radio, and is available online via iHeartRadio.

== History ==
=== Early years ===
On June 6, 1948, the station signed on as WRVC at 102.5 MHz. It was owned by Larus and Brother Company, a tobacco company which also owned WRVA and WRVB (now WRVQ) in Richmond. WRVC simulcast some of WRVA's CBS network and local programming, while originating its own; while WRVA's 50,000-watt signal is audible in the Norfolk area, Larus and Brother wanted this additional outlet for its programs to be heard in the Tidewater region of Virginia, even though few radios at the time could receive FM broadcasts.

By 1954, the network radio era was winding down, and WRVC became a "good music" station. Two years later, however, Larus and Brother threatened to close it outright on October 31, 1956. A group composed of the station's sales manager and program director and a Richmond attorney organized as the Virginia Good Music Company, and with contributions from thousands of supporters, bought WRVC from Larus for $13,500. Six years later, Virginia Good Music was authorized to move WRVC from 102.5 to 102.9 MHz, a move that became possible when WRFK-FM in Richmond moved to 106.5.

=== Progressive rock era 1970-75 ===
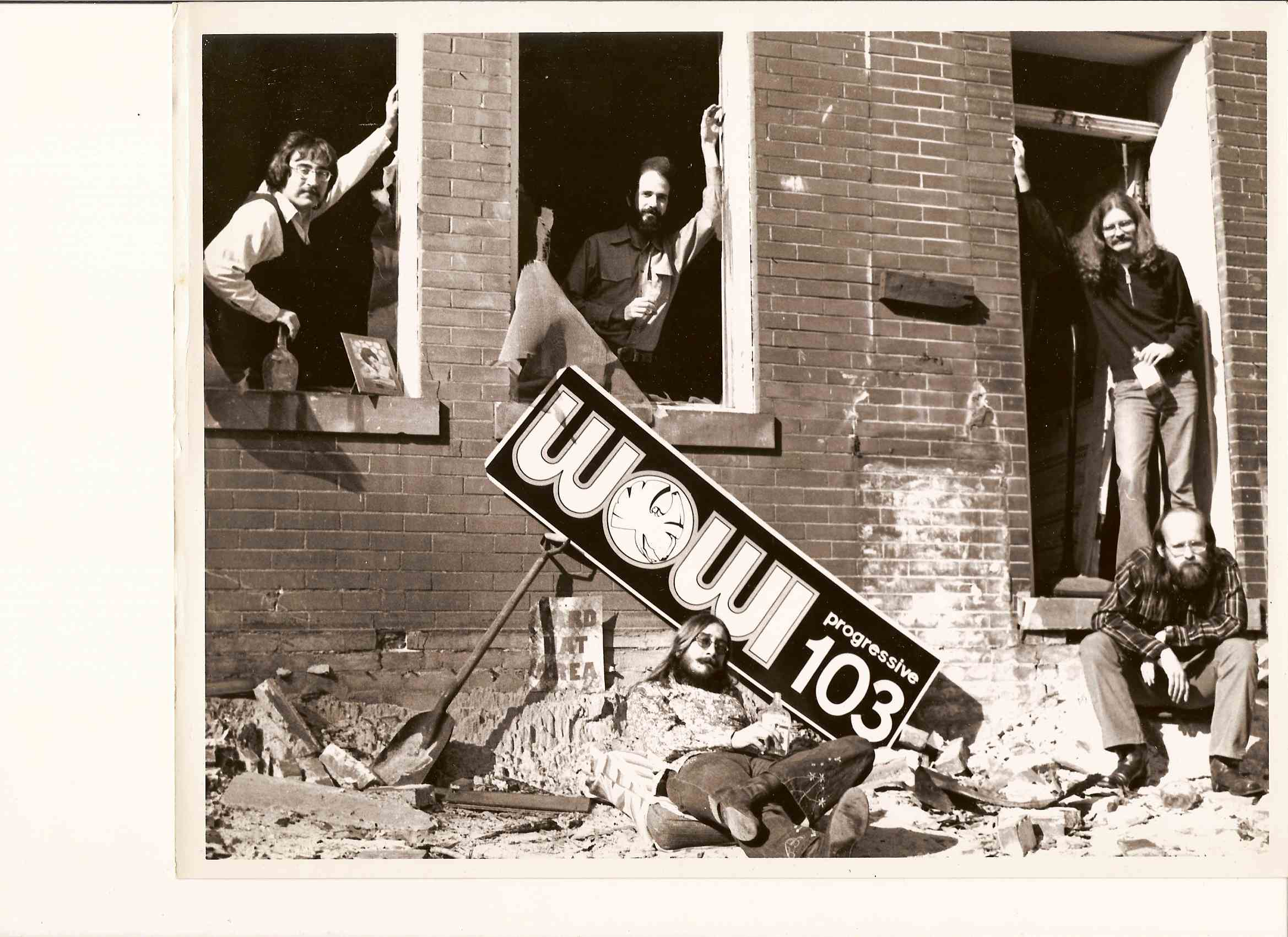
Several WOWI airstaff in the early 1970s. From left to right: Bruce Garraway, Randy Spiers, Larry Dinger, Larry Allen and Dave Nichols

By progressive, I don't mean to imply solid acid; rather, a carefully blended mixture of hard rock, hip country, blues, and jazz. [We] don't want to be a radical, revolutionary voice that widens the already wide gap. I would hope that we can be a bridge over that gap.

— Chuck Taylor, WOWI program director, 1971

The good music era came to an end in 1970 when the Brinsfield Broadcasting Company, owned by J. Stewart Brinsfield Sr. and Jr., acquired WRVC for $80,000. The call letters were changed to WOWI-FM on May 21, 1970; the FM suffix was dropped on March 11, 1971. While the station originally ran an automated "Solid Gold Rock and Roll" format, it flipped to progressive rock on May 15, 1971. Additionally, the station raised its power to 18,500 watts in two stages in 1971, then to 50,000 watts in 1973.

One particular air personality sparked controversy. In October 1972, John Frank Nesci was indicted by the United States District Court for the Eastern District of Virginia on federal obscenity charges for playing lyrics on June 8 that the court refused to transcribe in its indictment. Those lyrics came from an altered version of "Country Joe McDonald's Fish Chant" from the film Woodstock, with the chant of "F-I-S-H" altered to "F-U-C-K". Nesci's lawyers motioned to dismiss the case in November, saying that the relevant law was being used to punish him for his anti-war and other broadcasts, including reading the license plate numbers of unmarked police vehicles on air. While Nesci lost his job, the case was dismissed in early December, as station management had no involvement and it was no longer a wise use of time to prosecute the case.

=== Switch to urban contemporary ===
In 1974, Metro Communications Corporation—which changed its name to Willis Broadcasting Corporation in 1976—acquired WOWI from Brinsfield for $765,000; at the same time, it acquired Norfolk AM station WWOC in a separate transaction. Metro was headed by Bishop L. E. Willis, president of the Atlantic National Bank and pastor of the Garden of Prayer Church of God in Christ; at the time, Hampton Roads had one African American-oriented radio station, WRAP, but it was European-American-owned. WWOC and WOWI represented the first black-owned stations in the region.

Even though one newspaper article claimed that WOWI was top-rated in the area at the time of the Willis purchase, that was not the case according to Arbitron, whose survey earlier in the year had given the station a 1.7 rating—far behind market leader WRAP at 19.4. WOWI switched to an urban contemporary format, the first of its kind on FM.

The late 1970s presented WOWI with a near-existential crisis. In the culmination of a 15-month investigation by the Federal Communications Commission, the FCC designated the station's license renewal for hearing. Key in the case were three allegations: one that the station's sales manager in 1975 and 1976 used coercion and threats of boycotts to secure advertising from Coca-Cola, Sears and a Norfolk tire shop; another about the airing of misleading advertising and information about illegal lotteries; and another alleging Willis had taken over station WBLU at Salem. The case was ended in 1982 when an administrative law judge recommended a $10,000 fine to Willis and the renewal of its licenses.

For the first few years, WOWI was automated, but by 1980, the station had added live air talent. However, turnover meant that the station's ratings suffered in the 1980s, and in 1984, a competitor emerged: WMYK. In response, WOWI retooled, adopting the moniker "Hot 103". In addition, Willis turned down a sale offer from Glenn Mahone, owner of WPLZ-FM in Petersburg.

=== Ratings rise ===
After 15 years, Willis sold WOWI in 1989 to Ragan Henry and his U.S. Radio Company for $8.3 million. The new ownership tweaked the station's format to be faster-paced and include more rap and dance music. WOWI's ratings surged; from 1990 to 2000, WOWI led the Hampton Roads ratings and posted a double-digit ratings figure in all but one year. In the second half of the 1990s, WOWI also took the mantle of top-billing station in the market. The station also was the first urban-format outlet in the United States to break gospel artist Kirk Franklin, playing "Why We Sing"; soon, WGCI-FM followed, and Franklin's career surged.

U.S. Radio was sold to Clear Channel Communications, forerunner to iHeartMedia, in a $140 million, 18-station transaction in 1996. In the 2000s, WOWI fell to second place behind Entercom-owned WVKL.
