= WBHH =

WBHH may refer to:

- West Beverly Hills High, the setting of the TV series Beverly Hills, 90210 and 90210
- WHBT-FM, a radio station (92.1 FM) licensed to serve Moyock, North Carolina, United States, which held the call sign WBHH from 2001 to 2004
