= Wraparound =

Wraparound, wrap around, or wrap-around may refer to:

== Apparel ==
- Wraparound glasses - eyeglasses or sunglasses that have eye rims and lenses that curve around the face like goggles
- Wraparound baby sling, or wrap, a piece of cloth that supports a baby
- Wraparound clothing, also known as wrapper, e.g., wrap-around dress or archaic wraparound, scarf, shoal, tunics

== Arts, entertainment, and media ==
=== Music ===
- Wrap Around Joy, 1974 album by Carole King
- "Wrap Around Shades", a song on the 1995 Zumpano album Look What the Rookie Did
- "Wrapped Around", country song by Brad Paisley

=== Games and gaming ===
- Wrap-around straight, a non-standard poker hand
- Wraparound (video games), gameplay element

=== Other arts, entertainment, and media ===
- Wraparound animation short,
- Wraparound cover, e.g.:
  - Book cover, protective covering binding the pages of a book
  - CD/DVD case
  - Wraparound sleeve, for a record
- Wraparound (film and television media)

== Business, finance, and insurance ==
- Wraparound mortgage, more commonly known as a "wrap", a form of secondary financing for the purchase of real property
- Wraparound vehicle service agreement, a form of extended warranty

== Sports ==
- Wrap around, a hockey move
- Wrap around, a trick done on a skateboard while freestyle skateboarding
- Wraparound, a generally individual action used by basketball players to pass by defenders

== Other uses ==
- Wraparound (childcare), an intensive, individualized care management process for youths with serious or complex needs
- Wraparound, a possible outcome of an integer overflow in computing
- Wraparound bridge, guitar bridge
- Wraparound corkscrew, rollercoaster
- Wraparound couch, a type of sofa
- Wrap around MRI artifact

== See also ==
- Cover (disambiguation)
- Scroll (disambiguation)
- Word wrap, in word processing
- Wrap (disambiguation)
- RAP round - rocket assisted artillery round
