= WVXX =

Radio station in Norfolk, Virginia

- Norfolk, Virginia; United States
- Broadcast area: Hampton Roads
- Frequency: 1050 kHz
- Branding: Selecta 103.3 FM 1050 AM

Programming
- Language: Spanish
- Format: Contemporary hit radio

Ownership
- Owner: Davidson Media Group; (Davidson Media Station WVXX Licensee, LLC)

History
- First air date: 1952
- Former call signs: WRAP (1952–1954); WCMS (1954–2001); WFOG (2001–2003); WXMM (2003); WCMS (2003–2004)

Technical information
- Licensing authority: FCC
- Facility ID: 71286
- Class: B
- Power: 5,000 watts day; 358 watts night
- Transmitter coordinates: 36°49′44.0″N 76°12′26.0″W
- Translator: 103.3 W277DF (Norfolk)

Links
- Public license information: Public file; LMS
- Webcast: Listen Live
- Website: laselectaradio.com

WVXX (1050 AM) is a Spanish contemporary hit radio formatted broadcast radio station licensed to Norfolk, Virginia, serving Hampton Roads. WVXX is owned and operated by Davidson Media Group.

1050 AM is a Mexican clear-channel frequency. XEG-AM is the dominant Class A station.

== History ==
The station debuted in 1952, as the original WRAP. The station was licensed to broadcast only during daytime hours. When Rollins Broadcasting acquired then-WCAV on AM 850, the WRAP call letters and related format moved there on July 1, 1954.

=== WCMS ===
After Rollins acquired AM 850, Cy Blumenthal acquired AM 1050 and relaunched it as country music outlet WCMS.

In the late 1990s, the station used to simulcast with urban gospel WXEZ-FM 'Star 94.1'. On April 22, 2002, the station became easy listening "AM 1050 The Fog" WFOG. On November 25, 2003, WFOG dropped the standards format to simulcast classic country WCMS 100.5. Three days later, the simulcast ended when WCMS-FM flipped to Mainstream Rock and the classic country format was kept on 1050. Because of an error, the WXMM calls were assigned to 1050 and the WCMS calls stayed on 100.5 until the calls were finally swapped on December 18. On May 1, 2004, the station flipped to Fox Sports Radio.

In November 2004, Barnstable Broadcasting sold the station to Davidson Media and later changed the calls to WVXX on December 6, 2004. Fox Sports Radio was dropped on February 9, 2005, in anticipation of a Spanish format known as "Selecta 1050". Due to technical problems with Verizon, WVXX simulcasted WFOG until "Selecta" was launched at 2 p.m. on February 26, 2005.
