= It's a Wrap (disambiguation) =

"It's a Wrap" is a Mariah Carey song from 2009.

It's a Wrap may also refer to:

== Songs ==
- "It's a Wrap", a song by Mary J. Blige from Love & Life (2003)
- "It's a Wrap", a song by Kurupt from Against the Grain (2005)
- "It's a Wrap", a song by Zara Larsson from Introducing (EP) (2013)

== Other uses ==
- "It's a wrap!" (phrase), a variant of "That's a wrap!"

== See also ==
- The dictionary definition of that's a wrap at Wiktionary
- Wrap (disambiguation)
