= WNIS =

Radio station in Norfolk, Virginia

- Norfolk, Virginia; United States
- Broadcast area: Hampton Roads
- Frequency: 790 kHz
- Branding: AM 790 WNIS

Programming
- Format: Talk radio
- Affiliations: Fox News Radio; Premiere Networks; Salem Radio Network; Westwood One; Washington Commanders Radio Network

Ownership
- Owner: Sinclair Telecable; (Commonwealth Radio, LLC)
- Sister stations: WNOB; WROX-FM; WTAR; WUSH

History
- First air date: September 21, 1923
- Former call signs: WTAR (1923–1927); WTAR-WSUF (1927–1928); WTAR-WPOR (1928–1933); WTAR (1933–1997)
- Call sign meaning: "News and Information Station"

Technical information
- Licensing authority: FCC
- Facility ID: 4671
- Class: B
- Power: 5,000 watts unlimited
- Transmitter coordinates: 37°4′25.5″N 76°17′29.8″W

Links
- Public license information: Public file; LMS
- Webcast: Listen live
- Website: www.wnis.com

WNIS (790 AM) is a commercial radio station licensed to Norfolk, Virginia, United States, and serving the Hampton Roads media market. WNIS is owned by Sinclair Telecable. It airs a talk radio format.

WNIS has studios and offices on Waterside Drive in Norfolk. Its transmitter site is off Hall Road in Hampton. It transmits with 5,000 watts around the clock, using a directional antenna with a three-tower array.

== History ==
=== WTAR ===
WNIS is the oldest radio station in Virginia. The station was first licensed, as WTAR, on September 21, 1923. The original call letters were randomly assigned from a sequential roster of available call signs. WTAR signed on the air at 780 kHz with a power of 15 watts.

A second Norfolk station was licensed as WSUF, which in early 1928 changed its call sign to WPOR. As part of a consolidation, WTAR was formally licensed as WTAR-WSUF and later WTAR-WPOR, with WPOR only used when the station was broadcasting from an auxiliary studio. However, the Federal Radio Commission (FRC) requested that stations using only one of their assigned call letters drop those that were no longer in regular use, so on May 15, 1933, WPOR was eliminated from the dual call sign, with the station reverting to just WTAR.

On July 6, 1934, WTAR became an affiliate of the NBC Red Network after dropping the CBS Radio Network. At that time, the station was owned and operated by the parent company of the Norfolk Ledger-Star and The Virginian-Pilot.

By the late 1930s, WTAR got a power boost to 5,000 watts by day, 1,000 watts at night. In the 1940s, the nighttime power was increased to match the daytime power, 5,000 watts.

WTAR added an FM counterpart in 1947, WTAR-FM (97.3), which mostly simulcast the AM station. However, few people owned FM radios at that time, and WTAR gave up its FM license a couple of years later. The 97.3 frequency returned to the air in the mid-1950s as WGH-FM.

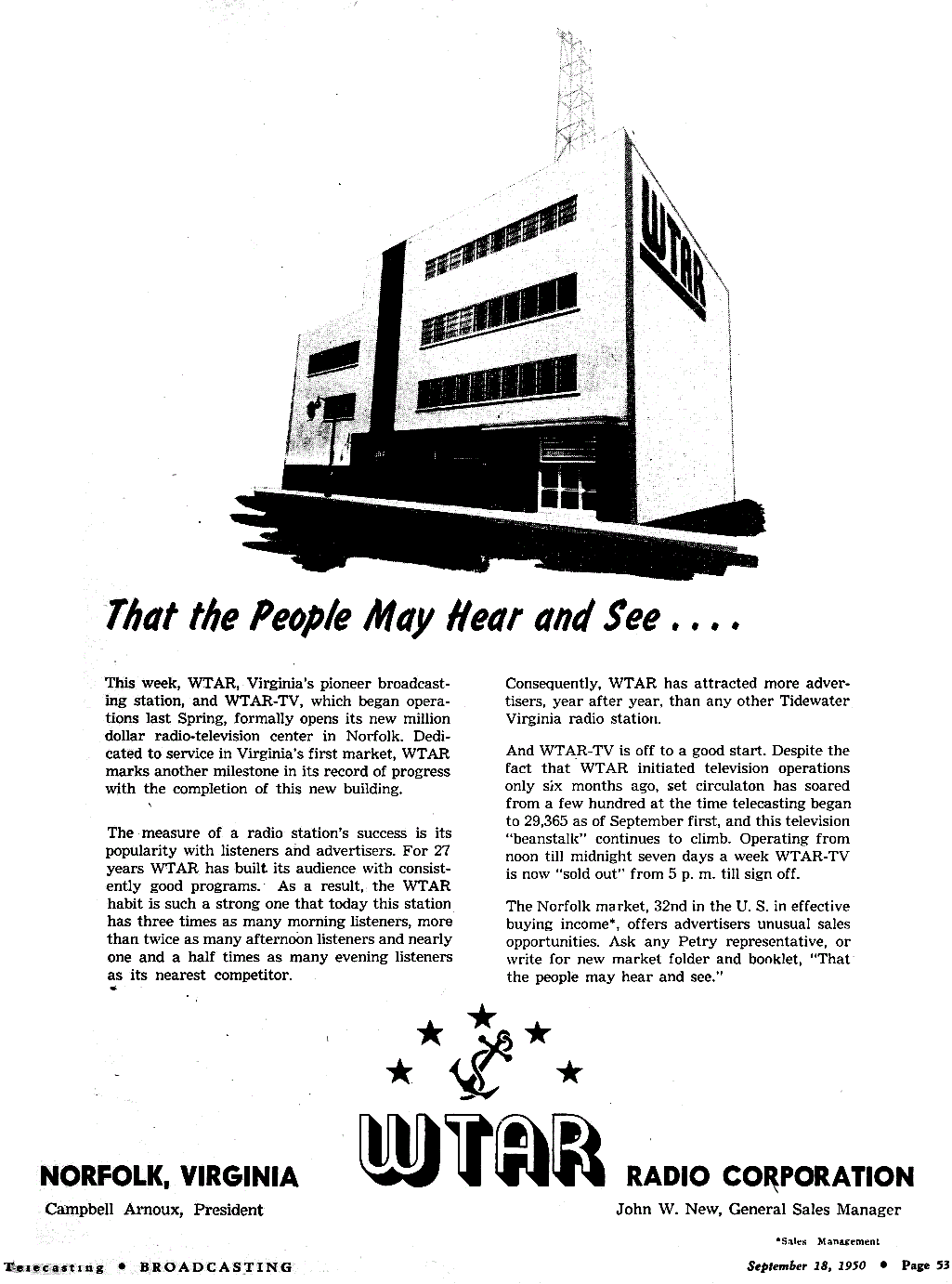
1950 advertisement for the new facility to be occupied by WTAR and recently started WTAR-TV.

In 1950, WTAR signed on a TV station, WTAR-TV (Channel 4, now WTKR on channel 3). Because WTAR was an NBC affiliate, the TV station primarily carried NBC-TV programs. As the first TV station in the Norfolk area, it also ran some shows from CBS, ABC and the DuMont Television Network. Within a year of the TV station's debut, both the TV and radio facilities moved into a new broadcasting center at 720 Boush Street.

In 1961, WTAR management decided to return to FM broadcasting, and signed on a new WTAR-FM, this time at 95.7 MHz (now WVKL). WTAR-FM aired automated beautiful music, separate from the AM station, which had a full service format of middle of the road music, adult contemporary, news, sports and talk. On March 7, 1984, WTAR began broadcasting in C-QUAM AM stereo.

By 1986 or 1987, WTAR switched its full-service format to an oldies format and became an affiliate of CBS Radio News. In the early 1990s, the station stopped playing music and became a news/talk station, adding an affiliation with CNN as well as CBS Radio. Around the same time, rival talk station WNIS got a big boost in power, going to 50,000 watts by day, 25,000 watts at night. Eventually, both stations would become co-owned, with Sinclair acquiring AM 850 in June 1997.

=== WNIS ===
On July 15, 1997, WTAR and its sister station on AM 850, WNIS, exchanged call letters, with AM 790 becoming WNIS, and the station stopped broadcasting in AM stereo, while WTAR was moved to 850 kHz. 850 has the stronger signal, broadcasting at 50,000 watts by day, the highest power authorized for AM stations by the FCC. At night it runs 25,000 watts, while 790 kHz transmits 5,000 watts day and night. Both stations had talk formats, although 850 WTAR later became a sports radio station and network affiliate of Fox Sports Radio.

== Programming ==
Weekdays, WNIS has local morning drive time talk and information shows called "Marcrini's Morning News" and the “Karen and Mike Show.” Other weekday hours feature nationally syndicated shows from Sean Hannity, Brian Kilmeade, "Clay Travis & Buck Sexton", Mark Levin, "Coast to Coast AM with George Noory" and "This Morning, America's First News with Gordon Deal". Weekends feature shows on money, health, cars and fishing, with syndicated hosts including Kim Komando, Guy Benson, Rudy Maxa, Mike Imprevento, "Live on Sunday Night, It's Bill Cunningham" and "Somewhere in Time with Art Bell". Most hours begin with world and national news from Fox News Radio.
