= Container (disambiguation) =

A container is any receptacle or enclosure for holding a product used in storage, packaging, and shipping.

Container may also refer to:

== Computing ==
- Container (abstract data type), a class or data structure that is a collection of other objects
- Container (type theory), abstractions that represent collection types in a uniform way
- Container, in computing represents containerization (computing) as it pertains to software application deployment
- Container format (computing), for storing related data together, such as audio and video data

== Other uses ==
- Container (board game), a 2007 economic-simulation game
- Container (film), a 2006 Swedish film by Lukas Moodysson
- Container (flowers), plants grown exclusively in containers
- "Container" (song), by Fiona Apple
- "Container" (The Apprentice), a 2013 television episode
- Container radar, a Russian over-the-horizon radar system

== See also ==
- Container Bob, nickname for the man found in a shipping container in 2001
- Enclosure (disambiguation)
- Receptacle (disambiguation)
