= Glass enclosure =

A glass enclosure is an enclosure made mostly out of glass and may more specifically refer to:

- A container or cage such as a fish tank, terrarium, etc.
- A building, such as a greenhouse (or glasshouse), that may or may not have a curtain wall
- Display case
- Casing around an object, such as a light bulb, LED, fuse (electrical), vacuum tube, glass case in electronic packaging, etc. (and at the top of a lighthouse, a lantern, the Popemobile, etc.)

== See also ==
- Glass (disambiguation)
- Enclosure (disambiguation)
