= WROX =

WROX may refer to:

- WROX (AM), a radio station (1450 AM) licensed to Clarksdale, Mississippi, United States
- WROX-FM, a radio station (96.1 FM) licensed to Exmore, Virginia, United States
- Wrox Press, a publisher of computer books
