= WPCE =

Radio station in Portsmouth, Virginia

- Portsmouth, Virginia; United States
- Broadcast area: Hampton Roads
- Frequency: 1400 kHz
- Branding: "Peace 1400"

Programming
- Format: Traditional Urban Gospel

Ownership
- Owner: Friendship Cathederal Family Worship Center, Inc.
- Sister stations: WGPL

History
- First air date: 1946; 80 years ago (as WLOW 1590 AM)
- Former call signs: WCKA (1946, CP); WLOW (1946–1961); WHIH (1961–1971); WWOC (1971–1975)
- Former frequencies: 1590 kHz (1946–1949), 1410 kHz (1949–1950)
- Call sign meaning: "Peace"

Technical information
- Licensing authority: FCC
- Facility ID: 72813
- Class: C
- Power: 1,000 watts day and night
- Transmitter coordinates: 36°48′10″N 76°16′58″W
- Translator: (95.3 MHz) W237FM (Portsmouth)

Links
- Public license information: Public file; LMS
- Website: WPCE Online

WPCE (1400 kHz) is a commercial AM radio station licensed to Portsmouth, Virginia, and serving Hampton Roads. WPCE is owned and operated by Friendship Cathederal Family Worship Center, Inc. It airs a traditional urban gospel radio format, with some Christian talk and teaching shows. The radio studios are on Church Street in Norfolk, Virginia.

WPCE is powered at 1,000 watts non-directional. The transmitter is off Barnes Road in Chesapeake, Virginia, near Interstate 464. Programming is also heard on 99-watt FM translator W237FM at 95.3 MHz.

== History ==
=== WLOW ===
The Commonwealth Broadcasting Corporation obtained a construction permit for a new daytime-only radio station on 1590 kHz in Portsmouth on July 25, 1946. The construction permit was given the call sign WCKA. The call letters were changed to WLOW before signing on the air. The station made several attempts to change frequency and gain nighttime authorization.

It finally succeeded when the FCC allowed the station to move to 1410 kHz in 1949 and was granted approval to broadcast at night. Another move, this time to 1400 kHz, was made the next year. Mark Scott, a sportscaster for the station, went on to broadcast Hollywood Stars Pacific Coast League games. The station also owned the short-lived Norfolk UHF television station WTOV-TV (channel 27).

=== TV station ===
In 1955, after its first WTOV-TV experience, WLOW wanted to make a second go-around at television, this time on the VHF band. It asked the FCC to move channel 13 from New Bern, North Carolina, to Princess Anne. (The commission denied the appeal in January 1956.) That same year, it was sold to a group that had also been burned by UHF television, the Winston-Salem Broadcasting Company, owner of WTOB radio and television in Winston-Salem, North Carolina, for $212,500. Winston-Salem sold the station to the James Broadcasting Company two years later, Tim Elliot, the owner of station WICE at Providence, Rhode Island, acquired WLOW for the same price four years later and changed the call letters to WHIH on July 1. Daytime power was increased to 1,000 watts the next year.

WHIH went bankrupt in 1964 and was assigned to trustees; Speidel Broadcasting Company of Virginia purchased the station out of bankruptcy. Speidel specialized in radio stations for the Black community, and the new acquisition adopted the same R&B format that characterized the chain. The station ran one promotion that attracted unexpected results. In 1967, WHIH ran a competition to determine which local school had the most spirit by receiving slips of paper with the schools' names written on them. It expected 15,000 total entries, but in the end, competition among the 20 participating schools was so high that the station rented an empty warehouse to store the nearly 180 million total votes and asked students to count their own submissions. The winner was George Washington Carver High with 54,272,025 votes.

Baron Broadcasting acquired WHIH in 1971. Effective June 11, the call letters were changed to WWOC—representing "We Will Overcome"—with the station maintaining a soul format. However, a year later, Baron flipped WWOC to a primarily contemporary music format. That did not last long, either, as WWOC changed to country on April 15, 1973.

=== WPCE ===
In October 1974, Metro Communications Corporation (later Willis Broadcasting Corporation), owned by Levi Willis, struck separate deals to acquire WWOC and WOWI (102.9 FM); the AM station fetched $365,000. The deal was a watershed moment for radio ownership in Hampton Roads, as WWOC and WOWI became the first two Black-owned stations in the market, competing against white-owned but African American-oriented WRAP. The call letters of WWOC were changed to WPCE on July 1, 1975, and the station initially converted to an R&B format before flipping to gospel by 1977.

The late 1970s brought legal peril to the Willis operation. In 1977, after a months-long investigation, the FCC moved to designate both stations' license renewals for hearing. Key in the case were three allegations: one that the station's sales manager in 1975 and 1976 used coercion and threats of boycotts to secure advertising from Coca-Cola, Sears and a Norfolk tire shop; another about the airing of misleading advertising and information about illegal lotteries; and another alleging Willis had taken over station WBLU at Salem. The case was ended in 1982 when an administrative law judge recommended a $10,000 fine to Willis and the renewal of its licenses.

Willis sold WOWI in 1989; by this time, what had started with the two Hampton Roads stations had grown into a major radio chain owning 22 stations from Arkansas to Pennsylvania. Many of the stations, including WPCE, carried a satellite-fed gospel format that originated at Willis's WWCA in Gary, Indiana, and included Willis's long-running Crusade for Christ program.

The Willis group had grown to 40 outlets by the early 2000s, but Levi Willis's failing health and a series of unpaid debts to the Internal Revenue Service caused financial problems for the chain. In 1997, the company paid more than $700,000 to settle claims of unpaid royalties for songs played on its stations. In 2003, the city of Norfolk seized the Willis Broadcasting Corporation headquarters after the company failed to pay $150,000 of property taxes over a five-year period. Willis died in 2009.

=== Changes in ownership ===
WPCE, WGPL (1350 AM), and WBXB (100.1 FM) in Edenton, North Carolina, were the last stations owned by the former Willis group, which restructured in 2018 and became known as the Christian Broadcasting Corporation (no relation to the Virginia Beach-based Christian Broadcasting Network). The general manager and program director of the group, Chester Benton, had previously worked at WHIH in the 1960s and then at WOWI after Willis bought it.

In August 2020, the Friendship Cathedral Family Worship Center, Inc., controlled by Katrina Chase, the executrix of Willis's estate, filed to acquire the three Christian Broadcasting Corporation stations in exchange for the cancellation of $90,591 in debt. The transaction was consummated on November 10, 2020.
