= WTWV-FM =

Radio station in Suffolk, Virginia

- Suffolk, Virginia; United States
- Broadcast area: Hampton Roads - Norfolk - Virginia Beach
- Frequency: 92.9 MHz (HD Radio)
- Branding: 92.9 The Wave

Programming
- Format: Yacht rock

Ownership
- Owner: Max Media; (MHR License, LLC)
- Sister stations: WGH, WGH-FM, WVBW-FM, WVSP-FM

History
- First air date: December 1965; 60 years ago (as WXYW)
- Former call signs: WXYW (1964–1970); WFOG (1970–1976); WFOG-FM (1976–1982); WFOG (1982–1996); WFOG-FM (1996–1999); WWSO-FM (1999–2003); WFOG (2003–2005); WVBW (2005–2022)
- Call sign meaning: "The Wave"

Technical information
- Licensing authority: FCC
- Facility ID: 64000
- Class: B
- ERP: 50,000 watts
- HAAT: 148 meters (486 ft)
- Transmitter coordinates: 36°52′35.0″N 76°23′28.0″W

Links
- Public license information: Public file; LMS
- Webcast: Listen Live
- Website: 929thewave.com

WTWV-FM (92.9 MHz) is a commercial radio station licensed to Suffolk, Virginia, and serving Hampton Roads. It is owned and operated by Max Media with studios on Greenwich Road in Virginia Beach near Interstate 264. WTWV-FM airs a yacht rock radio format using the branding "92.9 The Wave".

WTWV-FM has an effective radiated power (ERP) of 50,000 watts, the maximum for most stations in this section of Virginia. The transmitter is off Greenbrook Drive in Suffolk.

== History ==
=== Early years as WXYW, WFOG ===
WTWV-FM first signed on the air in December 1965 as WXYW. It was owned by the Suffolk Broadcasting Company, along with AM 1460 WLPM (now defunct). WXYW was largely automated, playing a beautiful music format of mostly instrumental versions of pop songs, as well as Hollywood and Broadway show tunes. In 1970, the call sign was switched to WFOG, since the Tidewater region of Virginia, along the Atlantic coast, often experiences fog. The station's easy listening sound lasted for more than 20 years.

In 1985, WFOG was acquired by JAG Communications of Virginia. JAG updated the easy listening format by adding more vocals, in an effort to attract younger listeners. WFOG changed hands again in 1989, being bought by the Sunshine Wireless Company for $8 million. Sunshine Wireless deleted the instrumentals and moved WFOG to a soft adult contemporary format, known as "Lite Favorites."

=== Soul classics and oldies ===
Barnstable Broadcasting acquired WFOG-FM in April 1999. On September 10, 1999, Barnstable converted the station to urban oldies as "Soul Classics 92.9." The call letters were also changed to WWSO-FM. The "Soul Classics" format lasted only two years.

On December 16, 2001, the station changed formats again, this time going to oldies, mostly hits of the 1960s and 70s, branded as "Oldies 92-9." The first song of the new format was The Beatles' "A Hard Day's Night." The WFOG call letters returned on December 5, 2003, when the classic country format on 100.5 FM shifted to AM and displaced the adult standards format on WFOG (now WVXX). Not long after, in 2004, the moniker changed to "92-9 WFOG," reflecting the change in call letters.

=== 92-9 The Wave ===
In early 2005, Max Media purchased WFOG, and the rest of the Barnstable cluster, making the stations locally owned and operated. Later that year, on July 1, the station changed its moniker to "FM 92-9 WFOG." To mark the switch, it played a countdown of the top 100 songs for each year from 1965 to 1985. Then, at 6 a.m. on July 21, "WFOG" signed off with Beach Boys' "Catch a Wave." Max Media then flipped the station to adult contemporary as "92-9 The Wave," with "Forever Young" by Rod Stewart as its first song. The call letters switched to WVBW. After airing an adult contemporary format for several years, the station transitioned to more of an adult hits format, with an emphasis on older music.

Barry Michaels was the morning drive time host for the station since the beginning of the oldies format. In July 2005, Michaels was let go by the new owners, who had hired Dick Lamb, the former morning host from rival station WWDE-FM, known as "2WD." In the weeks leading up to the Lamb's debut, it was hinted that he would return to the air on The Wave. Lamb recorded a TV commercial saying that he would be the host of a new morning show on The Wave. This was also mentioned on the station's bumpers between songs. On September 12, 2005, Lamb made his return to the airwaves as the new morning host for The Wave, along with his "2WD Breakfast Bunch" sidekick Paul Richardson. Jennifer Roberts, the only remaining member of the former morning show, also joined them. A contest was held to name the new morning show. Voters picked "Dick Lamb and the Morning Wave."

On May 3, 2011, WVBW segued from Adult Hits to Classic Hits, though no personnel changes were made. The station now plays hits of the 1970s, 1980s and 1990s, competing with iHeartMedia-owned WVMA until that station flipped to Top 40 in April 2012.

In September 2018, the station shifted its musical focus from classic hits to adult contemporary while maintaining its "Wave" branding. The switch put WTWV-FM in competition with rival AC station WWDE 101.3 FM.

On June 26, 2022, radio industry website RadioInsight disclosed that Max Media had applied to move the WVBW call letters to what was WVHT, its sister station. Upon the move, 92.9 would change its call letters to WTWV-FM. The change was approved by the FCC on June 29.

On February 5, 2026, the station flipped to a yacht rock format, while retaining the “92.9 The Wave” branding.
