= Rap (disambiguation) =

Rapping is a form of vocal delivery in music.

RAP or rap may refer to:

== Computing and technology ==
- Rapid Refresh (weather prediction)
- Recognized air picture
- Remote Application Platform, open source software
- Rocket-assisted projectile
- Route Access Protocol, an Internet protocol, see List of TCP and UDP port numbers#Ranges
- Returned Account Procedure, a GSMA data record format

== Healthcare ==
- Right atrial pressure, of the heart
- The Recognition and Prevention Program, of psychosis, Glen Oaks, New York, US

== People ==
- H. Rap Brown, activist in the Black Power movement in the US
  - H. Rap Brown Act, the Civil Rights Act of 1968
- Rap Reiplinger (1950-1984), Hawaiian comedian
- R.A.P. Ferreira, American rapper

== Politics ==
- Rassemblement pour l'alternative progressiste, a political party in Quebec
- Rural Alliance Party, former Solomon Islands political party

== Other uses ==
- Hip hop music or rap music, a musical genre
- R.A.P. Music, a studio album by Killer Mike
- RAP, the IATA airport code for Rapid City Regional Airport
- Rap (currency), the Romansh name for the sub-unit of the Swiss franc
- a counterfeit coin or something of negligible value, especially in Ireland
- AVV RAP, a former football club from Amsterdam
- RAP sheet (Record of Arrest and Prosecution sheet), a criminal record
- Rapper sword, a style of traditional sword-dancing from Northern England
- Reconciliation Action Plan, a business plan designed for organisations to improve relations with Indigenous peoples in Australia
- Regimental Aid Post, a frontline military establishment for triage on a battlefield
- Registered Aboriginal Party in the state of Victoria, Australia
- Restricted Area Permit, required for non-Indian people to visit Protected and restricted areas of India
- Retirement annuity plan, a type of pension plan in the UK
- Royal Arch Purple, organisation related to Orangeism
- Rule against perpetuities, a legal rule

== See also ==
- Rapp (disambiguation)
- Wrap (disambiguation)
