= Receptacle =

Receptacle may refer to:

== Biology ==
- Receptacle (botany), a plant anatomical part
- Seminal receptacle, a sperm storage site in some insects

== Electrical engineering ==
- Automobile auxiliary power outlet, formerly known as cigarette lighter receptacle, a type of DC power outlet
- Duplex receptacle, a part of a NEMA connector (a type of mains electricity connection)
- Electric receptacle, a type of AC power outlet
- A "female connector" or a "jack" (see electrical connector)

== Other uses ==
- Waste receptacle, a container for temporarily storing waste
  - Cigarette receptacle, a container for extinguishing and disposal of cigarette waste
  - Dumpster (receptacle), a type of mobile garbage bin

== See also ==
- Container (disambiguation)
- Receiver (disambiguation)
- Enclosure (disambiguation)
