= Wrapper =

Wrapper generally refers to a type of packaging. It may also refer to:

== Computing ==
- Wrapper (data mining), a method used in data mining
- Wrapper function, a function which main purpose is to call a second function
- Wrapper library
  - Driver wrapper, software that works as an adapter between an operating system and a driver
  - Wrapper pattern, where some programming code allows specified classes to work together that otherwise would not
- Primitive wrapper class, a class in object-oriented programming, usually in the language Java
- TCP Wrapper, software used to filter network access
- Service wrapper, software enabling other programs to be run as services or daemons
- A digital container format holding data and metadata

== Other ==
- Wrapper (clothing), a woman's garment which is worn over nightwear in North America, and a colorful garment widely worn in West Africa
- Wrapper (philately), postal stationery which pays the delivery cost of a newspaper or periodical
- Wrapper, the outer leaf of tobacco used in cigar making
- Newspaper wrapper
- The dust jacket of a hardcover book

== See also ==
- Label (disambiguation)
- Wrap (disambiguation)
- Rapping
