= WVBW-FM =

- Norfolk, Virginia; United States
- Broadcast area: Hampton Roads
- Frequency: 100.5 MHz (HD Radio)
- Branding: 100.5 The Vibe

Programming
- Format: Urban adult hits

Ownership
- Owner: Max Media; (MHR License LLC)
- Sister stations: WGH, WGH-FM, WTWV-FM, WVSP-FM

History
- First air date: October 1, 1962; 63 years ago
- Former call signs: WCMS-FM (1961–2003); WXMM (2003–2009); WVHT (2009–2022)
- Call sign meaning: Vibe (formerly "Wave Virginia Beach" on 92.9 until move of calls in 2022)

Technical information
- Licensing authority: FCC
- Facility ID: 71287
- Class: B
- ERP: 50,000 watts
- HAAT: 152 meters (499 ft)
- Transmitter coordinates: 36°49′44″N 76°12′26″W

Links
- Public license information: Public file; LMS
- Webcast: Listen Live
- Website: 1005thevibe.com

WVBW-FM (100.5 MHz, "100.5 The Vibe") is a commercial radio station licensed to Norfolk, Virginia, and broadcasting to the Hampton Roads area. WVBW-FM airs an urban adult hits radio format and is owned and operated by Max Media. The studios and offices are on Greenwich Road in Virginia Beach.

WVBW-FM has an effective radiated power (ERP) of 50,000 watts. The transmitter is off Gammon Road, also in Virginia Beach.

== History ==
=== Early years as WCMS-FM ===
WVBW-FM traces its roots back to July 1, 1954, when WCMS (1050 AM) first went on the air. It replaced a legendary African American-oriented radio station, WRAP, which moved to 850 AM. In 1961, WCMS was purchased by George A. and Marjorie Crump of Suffolk. The Crumps took the unprecedented step of playing only country music on WCMS when other Norfolk-area radio stations carried different musical styles, as country music was still looked down on in that era. Critics at the time assured the Crumps that their bold decision would fail quickly.

WCMS was originally a daytimer, broadcasting on a clear-channel frequency reserved for XEG in Monterrey, Mexico. WCMS had to go off the air between sunset and sunrise to avoid interfering with XEG. On October 1, 1962, WCMS-FM signed on the air. The FM station allowed WCMS's country music to be heard around the clock, even though only a small number of radios were equipped at that time to pick up FM broadcasts.

During the Crump family's ownership, WCMS-AM-FM received a number of awards from the Country Music Association and Academy of Country Music for its dedication to music and contribution to the industry. Because there are many recreational boat owners in the Tidewater region of Virginia, WCMS-AM-FM maintained a boat to assist sailors who ran into trouble while on Chesapeake Bay and the rivers that flow into it.

George A. Crump died in 2005, but up until the 1990s, he was occasionally heard on WCMS-AM-FM giving editorials. His famous line at the end of every commentary was "And that, in our opinion, is that."

=== Purchase by Barnstable Broadcasting ===
In 1999, Marjorie Crump sold WCMS-AM-FM for $15.5 million to Barnstable Broadcasting. The deal included the corporate office building and studios at 900 Commonwealth Place in Virginia Beach. Barnstable began firing longtime employees, such as Eric Stevens, who had worked at the station for nearly 20 years. As longtime staffers were being let go, the station began using DJs from new sister station WGH-FM.

With co-owned WGH-FM airing a mainstream country format, at 3:00 p.m. on April 10, 2003, after playing "Goodbye Says It All" by Blackhawk, WCMS-FM shifted to classic country music. The new format lasted only seven months. After more than 40 years of country music, the format was dropped entirely at 11:30 p.m. on November 28, 2003, with "On the Road Again" by Willie Nelson as its final song. WCMS-FM then began stunting with a loop of AC/DC's "You Shook Me All Night Long."

=== Rock era ===
At 3 p.m. on November 30, 2003, the station flipped to Mainstream Rock as "100.5 MAX-FM." The first song on "MAX-FM" was "Start Me Up" by The Rolling Stones. The call sign changed to WXMM on December 18, 2003.

With the format change, the country music format returned to its original frequency, 1050 AM. Morning drive time DJ Joe Hoppel continued his duties alongside newscaster Jim Long and co-host Jennifer Roberts. In 2004, Barnstable announced that the country format would end on WCMS just shy of the station's 50th anniversary. Joe Hoppel was inducted into the Country Music Hall of Fame in Nashville. The WCMS call letters moved to 1310 AM as a sports radio station, while the 1050 frequency was acquired by Davidson Broadcasting, a company specializing in Spanish language stations, and became WVXX.

In 2005, Barnstable Broadcasting sold all its stations to Max Media.

=== Contemporary hits WVHT ===
At 5 p.m. on April 23, 2009, the station began stunting as "Kung Pao 100.5 FM," playing "Classic Chinese Hits"; the stunt had previously been heard on KDOG in Mankato, Minnesota a few years prior. At 7:00 a.m. on April 27, WXMM flipped to Top 40/CHR, branded as "Hot 100.5." The first song was "Boom Boom Pow" by The Black Eyed Peas. The station changed its call sign to WVHT on May 4, 2009.

On January 13, 2014, at 8:45 a.m., after stunting for an hour with construction sounds, WVHT was relaunched, keeping the "Hot 100.5" name and Top 40 format. But it took a more music-intensive approach, as the home for "25 hits in a row." The logo was also changed with the adjustment in format.

On August 7, 2016, WVHT made another format adjustment, moving to Adult Top 40, and rebranded as "Hot 100". A few months later, the station returned to a mainstream direction. At that point, WVHT began competing with WNVZ. Around 2015, the Entercom-owned station also moved to a mainstream Top 40/CHR format after previously being a rhythmic CHR for more than a decade.

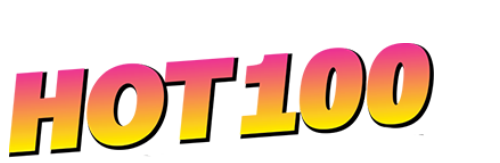
Former "Hot" logo (2016–2022)

In May 2019, WVHT added American Top 40 with Ryan Seacrest, Elvis Duran and the Morning Show and Most Requested Live after the station that had run these syndicated Top 40 programs, WNOH, flipped to an alternative rock format the year prior. In addition, WVHT added Zach Sang's nightly syndicated show, which ran until its cancellation in 2022.

=== The Vibe ===
On June 17, 2022, at 6 p.m., after playing "Never Be The Same" by Camila Cabello, WVHT began stunting with a loop of "Vivrant Thing" by Q-Tip as a prelude to a flip to a new format under the "100.5 The Vibe" branding. At 5 p.m. on June 20, WVHT flipped to what station management describes as "urban adult hits" under the "Vibe" branding, launching with "Sir Duke" by Stevie Wonder. Max Media described the format as featuring a "massive playlist" of songs from the hip hop, classic hip hop, R&B, and classic soul genres, under the oversight of new vice president of operations and programming Eddie Haskell, and new program director Anthony ‘Tone Hollywood’ Wheeler.

On June 26, 2022, radio industry website RadioInsight disclosed that Max Media had applied to move the WVBW call letters from the co-owned station on 92.9 FM to match the new format. Upon making the move, 92.9 changed its call sign to WTWV-FM. The change was approved by the FCC on June 29.
