= WROX-FM =

Radio station in Exmore, Virginia

- Exmore, Virginia; United States
- Broadcast area: Hampton Roads; Eastern Shore of Virginia
- Frequency: 96.1 MHz
- Branding: 96X

Programming
- Format: Alternative rock

Ownership
- Owner: Sinclair Telecable, Inc.
- Sister stations: WNIS; WNOB; WTAR; WUSH

History
- First air date: May 1986
- Former call signs: WIAV (1986–1988); WKSV (1988–1991); WMYA (1991–1993)
- Call sign meaning: "Rocks"

Technical information
- Licensing authority: FCC
- Facility ID: 60479
- Class: B
- ERP: 23,000 watts
- HAAT: 220 meters (720 ft)
- Transmitter coordinates: 37°15′45″N 76°0′45″W

Links
- Public license information: Public file; LMS
- Webcast: Listen live
- Website: www.96x.fm

WROX-FM (96.1 MHz) is an alternative rock formatted broadcast radio station licensed to Exmore, Virginia, United States, serving Hampton Roads and the Eastern Shore of Virginia. WROX-FM is owned and operated by Sinclair Telecable, Inc. WROX's studios are located on Waterside Drive in Downtown Norfolk, and its transmitter is located in Cape Charles.

== History ==
The station signed on in May 1986. Though it initially was planned to be a classical music station as WWGH, it instead signed on as WIAV, "Wave 96", with a top 40/CHR format. It had been constructed by Elleck Seymour of Myrtle Beach, South Carolina, who conceived a network of stations serving mid-Atlantic beach communities. After already dealing with technical problems, a lightning strike caused the station to leave the air in October 1987. The parent company, Resort Broadcasting, then filed for bankruptcy organization in March 1988. It was then co-owned with WVAB (1550 AM).

Bishop L.E. Willis later bought the two stations and then bought 92.1, later spinning off WVAB. It then shifted to a dance-leaning CHR as WKSV, "Kiss 96", in December 1988. Six months later, in May 1989, it flipped to a Christian adult contemporary format after WXRI was sold; the station inherited WXRI's music catalog. The format was tweaked to a more adult contemporary version in March 1990.

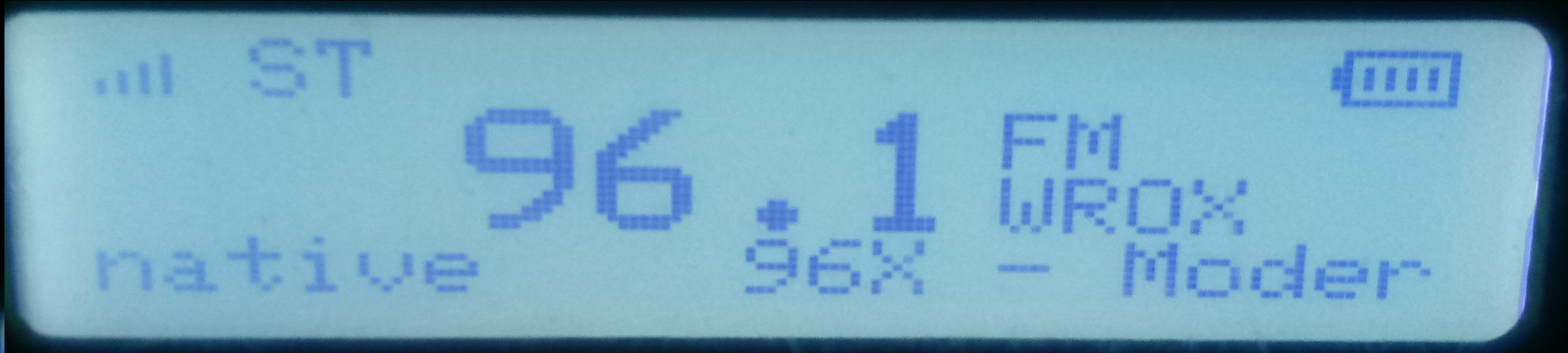
WROX on a SPARC HD Radio with RDS.

In May 1991, after several months off air due to storm damage, WKSV returned as urban contemporary "Touch 96"; WMYK then flipped to rock in June. It formed a simulcast with a new WMYK on 92.1 MHz.

In October 1993, Willis sold the station to Sinclair Telecable. Shortly after the sale, WMYA left the air for three weeks; it then flipped to an alternative rock format with the "96X" branding on October 25.

In 1995, in order to fill a coverage gap in the core portion of Hampton Roads, they put their new 250-watt translator on 106.1 MHz (W291AE) on the air; it was best heard in downtown Norfolk to help eliminate signal dropout in the downtown area. The translator existed until 2004, when WUSH was born.

On July 22, 1998, WROX-FM shifted back to top 40/CHR. The station terminated all of their on air personalities. This proved to be extremely unpopular with locals, as the station reverted back to alternative rock one year later on July 16, 1999. The station's callsign did not change during this time.

On June 24, 2019, WROX-FM shifted its format from alternative rock to adult album alternative, still branded as "96X".

On June 29, 2020, 96X quietly changed its format back to alternative rock in the midst of iHeartRadio's abrupt format flip of WNOH, launching an African American-oriented national news radio network.

WROX-FM has recently tweaked their alternative rock format to expand to partially play some active rock artists that crossover in the playlist rotation periodically. The station added old on air segments and new ones too. They relaunched their segment "into the pit" as an outlet for metal within the alternative rock format. Similar to how WNOR, known locally as "FM99" their active rock rival, they used to air "Metal Shop" during the 2000s.
