= WUSH =

Radio station in Poquoson, Virginia

- Poquoson, Virginia; United States
- Broadcast area: Hampton Roads
- Frequency: 106.1 MHz (HD Radio)
- Branding: US 106.1

Programming
- Format: Country
- Subchannels: HD2: WTAR simulcast (AAA)
- Affiliations: Premiere Networks

Ownership
- Owner: Sinclair Telecable; (Commonwealth Broadcasting, LLC)
- Sister stations: WNIS; WNOB; WROX-FM; WTAR

History
- First air date: April 2001; 25 years ago
- Former call signs: WEXM (2001–2003); WKOC (2003–2004); WPYA (2004); WKCK-FM (2004–2005); WZNR (2005–2006); WNRJ (2006–2007); WUFH (2007–2008)
- Call sign meaning: "United States Hampton" (Roads)

Technical information
- Licensing authority: FCC
- Facility ID: 78447
- Class: B1
- ERP: 11,000 watts
- HAAT: 149.3 meters (490 ft)
- Transmitter coordinates: 36°51′39.0″N 76°21′1.0″W
- Translator: HD2: 96.5 W243DJ (Norfolk)

Links
- Public license information: Public file; LMS
- Webcast: Listen live
- Website: www.us1061.com

WUSH (106.1 FM) is a country music formatted broadcast radio station licensed to Poquoson, Virginia, United States, serving Hampton Roads. WUSH is owned by Sinclair Telecable.

WUSH is licensed by the FCC to broadcast in the HD radio format.

== History ==
The 106.1 frequency was formerly a translator for WROX-FM to service signal dropouts in Downtown Norfolk. This signed on in 1995 and was turned off in 2003. In April 2001, a full-powered frequency signed on the air at 106.1 as WEXM, serving the Eastern Shore of Virginia (with a city of license of Exmore), and simulcasting WKOC. The simulcasting would be discontinued in March 2004, as 106.1 would relocate their tower to Hampton and be re-licensed to Poquoson.

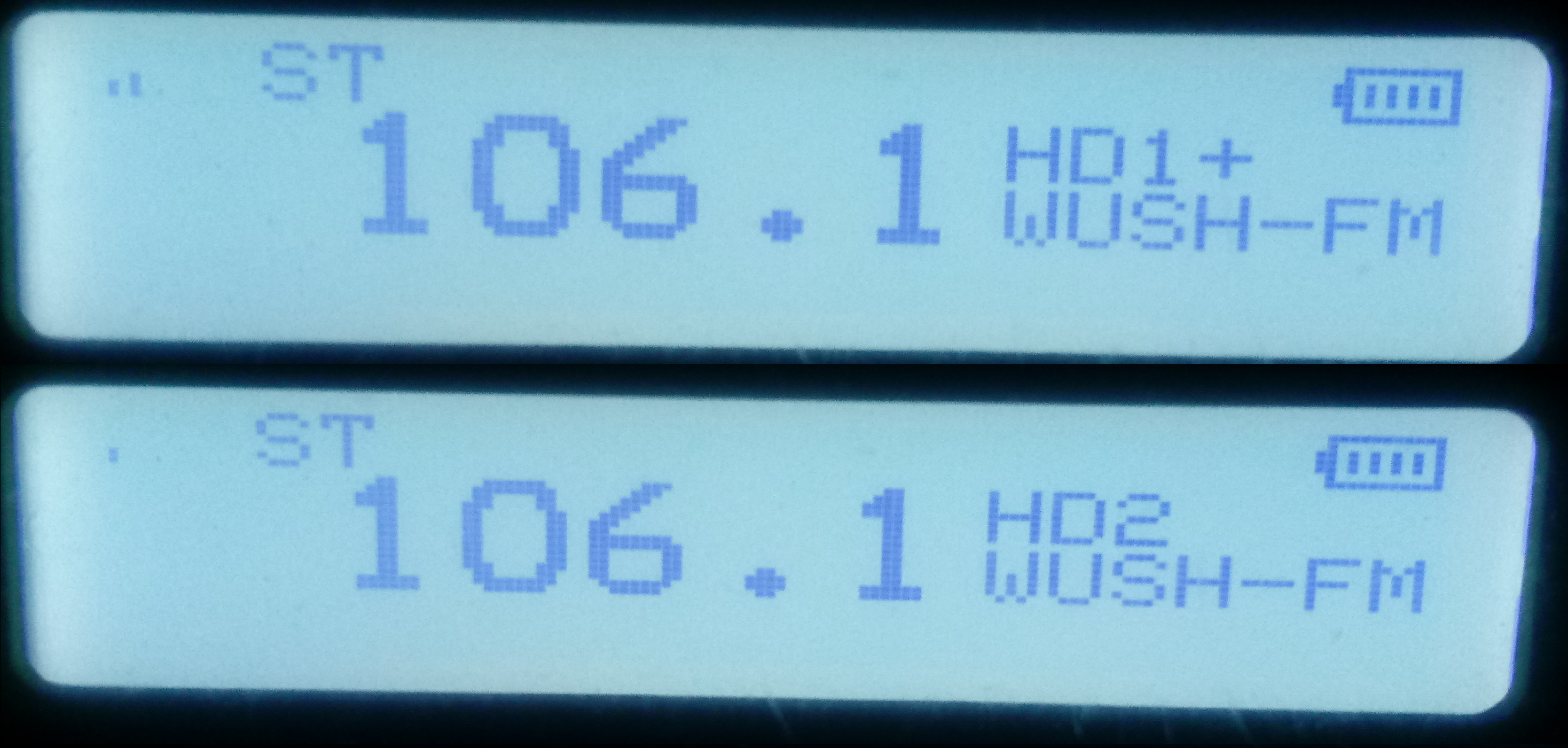
WUSH's HD Radio Channels on a SPARC Radio with PSD.

On March 7, 2004, the 106.1 signal would debut as adult hits WPYA "106.1 Bob-FM". This format was very popular with listeners, and fared much better than sister station WKCK (now WNOB)'s country music format. The two stations swapped signals, formats and call sign, and became "Kick 106" on September 23, 2004. That would last until 5 p.m. on February 2, 2005, when, after playing "Gone Country" by Alan Jackson, the format, which never had high ratings, was dropped and the station began stunting with Snoop Dogg's "Drop It Like It's Hot" for two days straight. The Top 40/CHR format known as WZNR, "The Zone @ 106.1," debuted at 2 p.m. on February 4 (after a brief joke "introduction" for a soft AC format called "Mix 106"), with Kelly Clarkson's "Since U Been Gone" being the first song played. The station was hoping to fill the market's mainstream top 40 void that was left open by WNVZ in 1993 by giving listeners "All The Hits, Not Just Some Of Them." The station also carried the syndicated morning show, "The Playhouse", which is based out of Portland, Oregon (the reasoning behind this was most likely that the show's host (PK)'s hometown was Virginia Beach).

Even though the format was well received in the area, the station had low ratings. On September 21, 2006, at 12:04 p.m., WZNR exited the "Zone" by segueing from the All-American Rejects' "Move Along" to an introduction to the new WNRJ, "Energy 106.1, Music That Makes You Move", followed by its first song in the new format, Bob Sinclar's Rock This Party (Everybody Dance Now)." WNRJ's format, branding and logo are also extremely similar to that of Alan Burns' Movin' format. Although this station was billing themselves as a "rhythmic hot AC," WNRJ was expected to lean slightly towards a Dance direction (as evidenced by the Sinclar track they launched with).

In January 2007, WNRJ's playlist began to shift towards rhythmic contemporary by incorporating more current R&B/hip-hop product into the mix and lessening on Dance and Old School tracks as a way to boost ratings and because of WWHV's flip from Urban to Sports (now WXTG). During this time, the station was still suffering from dismal numbers in the Arbitron ratings. On August 27, at Midnight (ET), WNRJ shifted formats to adult top 40, with the current hot AC Pop/Rock fare mixed in with some of the Rhythmic crossovers that were held over from the previous format.

=== December 2007 relaunch ===
Energy's new adult top 40 format ultimately failed in the ratings, as the station peaked below a 2 share for the market's ratings. Sinclair Communications decided to take station in a different direction by flipping back to their previous country music format, while going in stunt mode for about 4 days to promote the change. On December 14, 2007, just before 2 pm (ET), after playing "Bye Bye Bye" by NSync, WNRJ began stunting with all Garth Brooks songs as "Garth 106", starting with "The Thunder Rolls"; the stunt would shift over the next few days to songs by Kenny Chesney as "Kenny 106", Martina McBride as "Martina 106", and George Strait as "George 106".

The station completed its shift back to country music as WUSH, "US106, America's Country" at 5 p.m. on December 18, 2007, with the first song on "US106" being "It's Five O'Clock Somewhere" by Alan Jackson and Jimmy Buffett. Two days later, though, the station took the WUFH call sign. The station continued to ID as "WUSH", signaling a possible goof with either the station or the FCC. The call sign were corrected on January 2, 2008.

On August 15, 2008, the FCC granted a request from Sinclair Communications to move the antenna and increase the power of WUSH. Owner Bob Sinclair also made the announcement on-air at 5 p.m. The new tower started broadcasting on May 29, 2009 with 11,000 watts in Portsmouth, Virginia.

=== HD Radio ===
In 2014, WUSH started broadcasting in HD Radio and put sister station WROX-FM on its HD2 sub-channel. On March 25, 2016, at noon, the HD2 channel shifted to Mainstream Rock, branded as "96.5 Rocks", which is simulcasted on translator W243DJ (96.5 FM).

On June 26, 2017, at noon, WUSH-HD2 changed their format from mainstream rock to soft oldies, branded as "Vintage 96.5", with the first song being "Lookin' out My Back Door" by Creedence Clearwater Revival. Just a few months later, on September 15, 2017, at 3 p.m., WUSH-HD2 flipped to a simulcast of sports-formatted WTAR 850 AM. On September 6, 2022, WUSH-HD2 changed their format to a simulcast of hot adult contemporary-formatted WTAR, as "96.5 "Lucy FM".
