= Wrapping =

Wrapping may refer to:

- Buddy wrapping, the act of bandaging a damaged (particularly a fractured) finger or toe together with a healthy one
- Overwrap, a wrapping of items in a package of a wrapping over packaging
- Wrapping (text), a software feature that breaks text into lines ensuring it fits into the available width of a page, allowing text to be read without any horizontal scrolling.
- Wrapping (graphics), the process of limiting a position to an area in computer graphics
- Integer overflow, a variable that exceeds its maximum value in computing
- Wrapping paper, paper used for wrapping a gift
- "Wrapping", an episode of the television series Teletubbies
- Window capping or wrapping, the covering of wooden trim on buildings with aluminum or vinyl.

== See also ==
- Mandrel wrapping, a technique used to modify the modal distribution of a propagating optical signal in multimode fiber optics
- Toilet papering, a victim's property is covered with toilet paper
- Rapping
- Wrap (disambiguation)
