= WPTE =

Hot adult contemporary radio station in Virginia Beach, Virginia, United States

- Virginia Beach, Virginia; United States
- Broadcast area: Hampton Roads
- Frequency: 94.9 MHz (HD Radio)
- Branding: 94.9 The Point

Programming
- Language: English
- Format: Hot adult contemporary
- Affiliations: Westwood One

Ownership
- Owner: Audacy, Inc.; (Audacy License, LLC)
- Sister stations: WNVZ; WVKL; WWDE

History
- First air date: May 5, 1984 (as WNRN)
- Former call signs: WNRN (1984–1987); WJQI-FM (1987–1996)
- Call sign meaning: "Point"

Technical information
- Licensing authority: FCC
- Facility ID: 64004
- Class: B
- ERP: 50,000 watts
- HAAT: 152 meters (499 ft)
- Transmitter coordinates: 36°48′37.0″N 76°16′59.0″W

Links
- Public license information: Public file; LMS
- Webcast: Listen live (via Audacy)
- Website: www.audacy.com/pointradio

WPTE (94.9 FM) is a hot adult contemporary formatted broadcast radio station licensed to Virginia Beach, Virginia, serving Hampton Roads. WPTE is owned and operated by Audacy, Inc. WPTE's studios are located on Clearfield Avenue in Virginia Beach, while its transmitter is located in Chesapeake.

== History ==
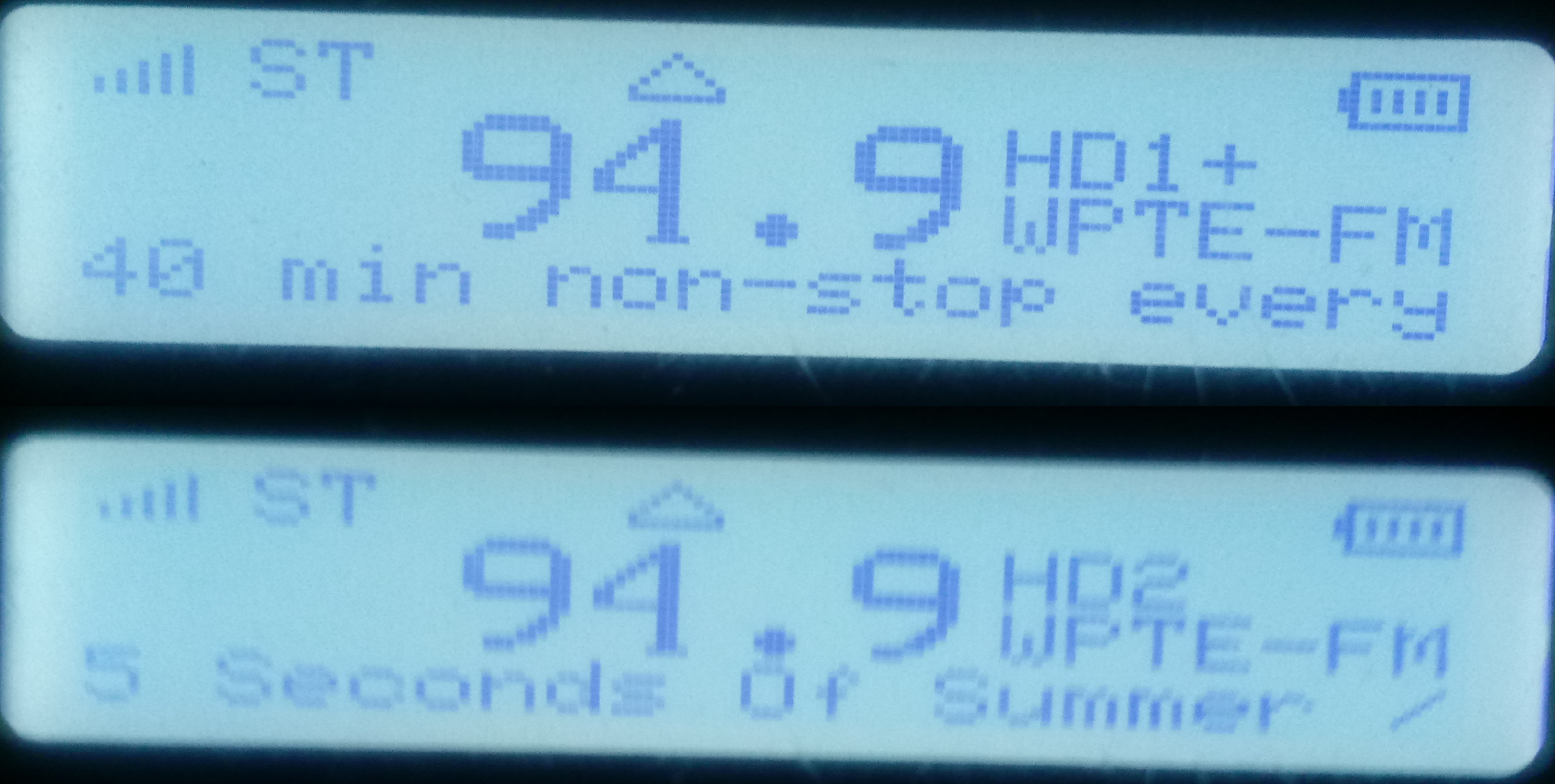
WPTE's HD Radio Channels on a SPARC Radio with PSD and EAS.

The station signed on May 5, 1984, as easy listening-formatted WNRN, "Winner 95". On March 3, 1987, WNRN changed its call letters to WJQI to stand for the new "Joy 95" branding, and would shift to soft AC. By March 1994, the station evolved to hot AC and adopted the "Q94.9" branding, before flipping to "94.9 The Point" on April 15, 1996, with the call letters changing to the current WPTE on May 6, 1996.
