= WNOB =

Radio station in Chesapeake, Virginia

- Chesapeake, Virginia; United States
- Broadcast area: Hampton Roads; Northeastern North Carolina
- Frequency: 93.7 MHz
- Branding: 93-7 Bob FM

Programming
- Format: Adult hits

Ownership
- Owner: Sinclair Telecable; (Commonwealth Radio, LLC.)
- Sister stations: WNIS; WROX-FM; WTAR; WUSH

History
- First air date: November 30, 1973
- Former call signs: WMYK (1973–1991); WKOC (1991–2003); WKCK (2003–2004); WPYA (2004–2009)
- Call sign meaning: Turn Your Knob to Bob

Technical information
- Licensing authority: FCC
- Facility ID: 73184
- Class: C1
- ERP: 100,000 watts
- HAAT: 295 meters (968 ft)
- Transmitter coordinates: 36°32′55.0″N 76°11′16.0″W

Links
- Public license information: Public file; LMS
- Webcast: Listen live
- Website: www.937bobfm.com

WNOB (93.7 FM) is an adult hits formatted broadcast radio station licensed to Chesapeake, Virginia, United States, serving Hampton Roads and Northeastern North Carolina and is owned by Sinclair Telecable.

WNOB's studios are located on Waterside Drive in Norfolk, while its transmitter is located on Route 168 in Moyock, North Carolina, just south of the Virginia–North Carolina state line.

== History ==
The station, originally licensed to Elizabeth City, North Carolina, started in 1973 as AOR/Top 40 hybrid station WMYK The New K94, and would later shift to a New Wave/"Rock of the 80s" format in 1982.

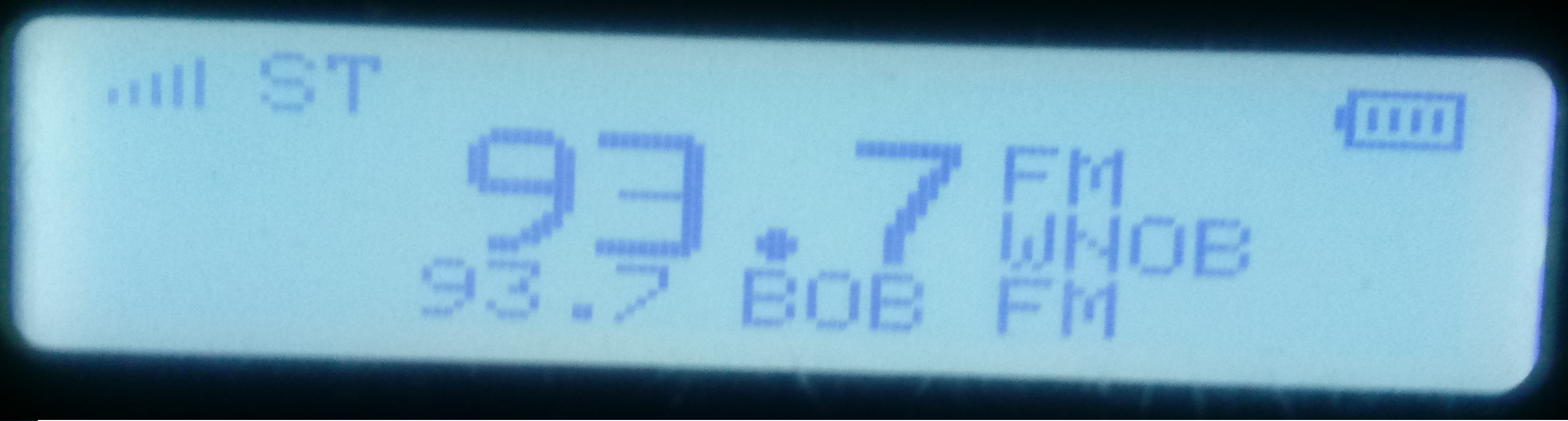
WNOB on a SPARC HD Radio with RDS.

In 1984, WMYK became The Rhythm of the City, K94 with a CHR/urban contemporary format (also known as "CHUrban", which would become the basis for what is now the rhythmic contemporary format). From 1988 to 1990 WMYK was known as "Power 94", later it became "WMYK-94FM".

At 3 p.m. on June 21, 1991, after stunting with a loop of "My Prerogative" by Bobby Brown, "Joy" by Satellite Orchestra, "God Bless The U.S.A." by Lee Greenwood, "(I Can't Get No) Satisfaction" by The Rolling Stones, and "Every Little Step" by Bobby Brown, 93.7 switched to an Adult Album Alternative format branded as "93.7 The Coast" with call letters WKOC. (At the same time as the format switch, the WMYK calls and urban format moved to 92.1 FM.) WKOC simulcasted on 94.1 WKOD from 1991-1992 and 106.1 WEXM from 2001-2004. WKOC added Howard Stern in October 1995.

In May 1996, Sinclair Communications purchased the station, as well as WTAR, for $8.1 million. At the time, Bob Sinclair was feuding with Tidewater Communications (owners of WNOR/WAFX) due to the fact that WNOR attempted to block Sinclair from installing a second transmitter on WROX. Perry Stone, program director of both WROX and WKOC, issued an on-air ultimatum that WNOR must pay Sinclair $1 million by the following Wednesday, or they would change the WKOC's format to rival WNOR. On the other hand, if WNOR paid, Sinclair would convert WKOC to Country music. WNOR did not acknowledge this and thus on May 29, 1996, WKOC would briefly become "K94" again with a hard rock format,"WKOC 93.7 Chesapeake Norfolk, VA E Skip July 1999". but would switch back to "The Coast" and adult album alternative music on September 19, 1996.

On December 3, 2003, just after 4 p.m., after playing "Otherside" by the Red Hot Chili Peppers, WKOC announced it would fill the hole left behind by WCMS's flip to rock the previous month by flipping to "93.7 Kick FM", and began stunting with a loop of "Gone Country" by Alan Jackson. Two days later, the station officially completed its flip to country. On December 11, 2003, WKOC changed call letters to WKCK-FM to match the "Kick" branding.

On March 7, 2004, simulcast partner WEXM broke from the simulcast and switched to Adult Hits as "106.1 Bob FM". (WEXM changed call letters to WPYA a week earlier on February 27.)

At Midnight on September 23, 2004, WKCK and WPYA swapped formats, with 93.7 adopting the "Bob FM" format and 106.1 became "Kick 106". On September 17, 2009, WPYA changed call letters to the current WNOB.
