= WWDE-FM =

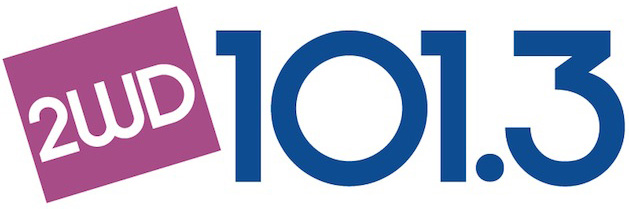
- Hampton, Virginia; United States
- Broadcast area: Hampton Roads
- Frequency: 101.3 MHz (HD Radio)
- Branding: 101-3 2WD

Programming
- Language: English
- Format: Adult contemporary

Ownership
- Owner: Audacy, Inc.; (Audacy License, LLC)
- Sister stations: WNVZ; WPTE; WVKL

History
- First air date: June 1, 1962
- Former call signs: WVEC-FM (1962–1974); WVHR (1974–1978)

Technical information
- Licensing authority: FCC
- Facility ID: 40753
- Class: B
- ERP: 50,000 watts
- HAAT: 152 meters (499 ft)
- Transmitter coordinates: 36°49′41.5″N 76°15′3.8″W

Links
- Public license information: Public file; LMS
- Webcast: Listen live (via Audacy)
- Website: www.audacy.com/2wd

WWDE-FM (101.3 MHz) is a commercial radio station licensed to Hampton, Virginia, and serving the Hampton Roads area. WWDE-FM airs an adult contemporary radio format. The station is owned and operated by Audacy, Inc.

WWDE-FM has studios and offices on Clearfield Avenue in Virginia Beach, and its transmitter is off East Indian River Road in Norfolk.

== History ==
Original Logo used until April 2013.

The station first signed on the air on June 1, 1962, owned by Dick Lamb, Larry Saunders and Gene Loving. During the 1970s, it was co-owned with WVEC (1490 AM, now WXTG) and WVEC-TV. Its call letters were WVHR, and it aired a middle of the road music format, sometimes simulcast with its AM sister station. Its longtime adult contemporary format started on July 31, 1978, with Lamb and sidekick Paul Richardson hosting the "2WD Breakfast Bunch" until January 28, 2005. Both have moved to rival WTWV-FM.

In May 1987, a WWDE overnight DJ, Debbie Dicus, was murdered in broad daylight while tending to her garden in a public park in Hampton by Ronald Blanchard. Her tragic murder is noted on a Forensic Files episode, "Garden of Evil". Through the 80s and 90s 2WD has been between hot ac then ac. In the late 90s WWDE softened to adult contemporary and added Delilah's love songs show. The station also shifted to Casey Kasem's adult contemporary version of American Top 20. WWDE has been the Hampton Roads home for Christmas music. On December 26, 2006, WWDE shifted to a soft adult contemporary, but retained the "2WD" moniker. The station promoted four decades of music every four songs. On April 1, 2013, WWDE shifted back to mainstream adult contemporary, and rebranded as "The New 101.3 2WD". With the change Delilah was deleted from the schedule so the station could focus on more music and a more upbeat approach.
