= WVSP-FM =

Radio station in Yorktown, Virginia

- Yorktown, Virginia; United States
- Broadcast area: The Peninsula, Middle Peninsula and Southside of Hampton Roads
- Frequency: 94.1 MHz (HD Radio)
- Branding: Priority Auto Sports Radio 94.1 ESPN

Programming
- Format: Sports radio
- Subchannels: HD2: Sports radio (WGH simulcast)
- Affiliations: ESPN Radio; Baltimore Orioles Radio Network; Norfolk Tides; Old Dominion University Sports

Ownership
- Owner: Max Broadcast Group Holdings, LLC; (MHR License, LLC)
- Sister stations: WGH, WGH-FM, WTWV-FM, WVBW-FM

History
- First air date: 1975
- Former call signs: WYVA-FM (1975–1978); WYVA (1978–1982); WKEZ-FM (1982–1991); WKOD (1991–1992); WXEZ (1992–2009)
- Call sign meaning: "Virginia Sports"

Technical information
- Licensing authority: FCC
- Facility ID: 19836
- Class: B
- ERP: 40,000 watts (analog); 1,600 watts (digital)
- HAAT: 162 meters (531 ft)
- Transmitter coordinates: 37°12′33.5″N 76°32′33.8″W

Links
- Public license information: Public file; LMS
- Webcast: Listen Live
- Website: espnradio941.com

WVSP-FM (94.1 MHz, "Priority Auto Sports Radio 94.1 ESPN") is a sports formatted broadcast radio station licensed to Yorktown, Virginia, United States, serving The Peninsula, Middle Peninsula and Southside of Hampton Roads. WVSP-FM is owned and operated by Max Broadcast Group Holdings, LLC. WVSP's studios are located on Greenwich Road in Virginia Beach, while its transmitter is located in Newport News Park in York County near Colonial National Historical Park.

== History ==
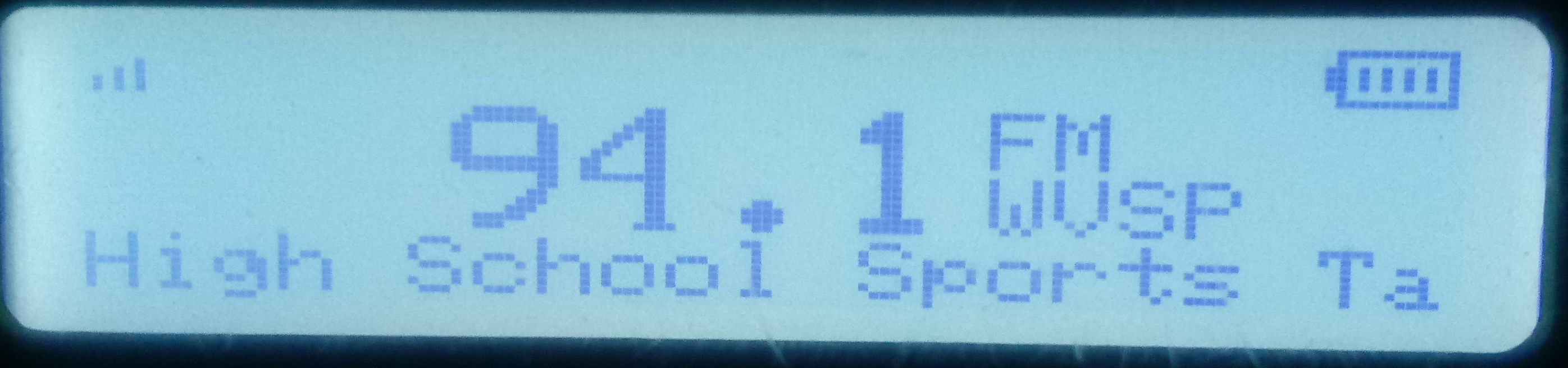
WVSP on a SPARC HD Radio with RDS.

The station signed on in 1975 as WYVA-FM, serving Yorktown, Virginia, with a country format. In 1986, it changed call letters to WKEZ while retaining the country format. On October 14, 1991, it began a time-brokered simulcast with then AAA-formatted WKOC "The Coast" in Norfolk. The next year, the simulcast was ended and the station switched to adult contemporary as WXEZ, "EZ94". The transmitter tower was moved to give the station a better signal over the Tidewater area. The station was sold in the mid 1990s to Barnstable Broadcasting and switched to an urban gospel music format as "Star 94.1" in August 2000. Barnstable later sold its Tidewater market stations to locally-based Max Media.

On October 5, 2009, WXEZ swapped formats with WGH (1310 AM) and became a sports radio station, and at that time changed their call letters to WVSP-FM. With this change, there are now two sports stations on the FM dial in Hampton Roads. ESPN Radio also gained an improved coverage area much greater than when they were located on 1310 AM. The black gospel format moved to 1310 AM.

On February 1, 2023, the station rebranded as "Priority Auto Sports Radio 94.1", as part of a naming rights deal with local automotive dealer chain Priority Automotive, one of the few such deals involving a radio station's branding. WVSP-FM's programming, including its ESPN Radio affiliation, did not change.
