= Service wrap =

A service wrap is a set of non-core services which are bundled with a core service to form a complete package of services that are sold. For example, if the service sold is an IT service (such as a cloud computing service), the service wrap includes the governance of that service, such as service monitoring tools.

The term appears to be closely associated with the IT and Network Services industries.
