= Container Boy =

Egyptian-Canadian stowaway

Container Boy was the nickname given to Amir Farid Rizk, a Canadian man who attempted to travel from Egypt to Canada as a stowaway in a shipping container in October 2001. He was discovered in Italy and arrested under then-recent anti-terrorism legislation, and U.S. officials accused him of working for Al-Qaeda. Within a few weeks, the Italian government ordered him to be released from custody.

Amir Farid Rizk was born in Egypt and, by 2001, had been a Canadian citizen for nearly twenty years. He had studied in Egypt and North America to become an airline mechanic. According to his lawyer, Rizk was a Maronite Christian with a sister who had married a Muslim man in Egypt. She left him and moved to Canada, and Rizk, fearing persecution, made plans to go back to Canada as well. Fearing that his brother in law might prevent his departure, elected to leave Egypt hidden in a Maersk SeaLand shipping container on a cargo boat bound for Halifax, Canada, via Rotterdam. The container was furnished with a bed, toilet, heater, food, water, a laptop, cell phones, a satellite phone, family photos, and a dishwasher. Rizk also brought with him his Canadian passport, security passes for airports in Canada, Thailand and Egypt, and a plane ticket to Montreal.

Five days after leaving Alexandria, Egypt, and after arriving at the Port of Gioia Tauro, Rizk found he was experiencing breathing problems. He banged on the wall and alerted the workers. U.S. officials suspected him of working for Al-Qaeda, and he was arrested on October 19 under recently-passed Italian anti-terrorism laws – making him the first person in the country to be held under the legislature. He was nicknamed "Container Boy" by a Canadian cabinet minister.

While the Italian officials initially believed his Canadian passport to have been forged, they soon determined soon after that it was genuine and that Rizk had, in all likelihood, decided to leave Egypt in the shipping container for personal reasons. The Italian courts ordered his release on 15 November 2001.

In the aftermath of Rizk's discovery, Canadian politician Stockwell Day called for more inspections and security for shipping containers travelling internationally. Some American politicians called for similar measures, and Rizk's case was discussed in a Senate hearing related to terrorism.
