= Scroll (disambiguation) =

A scroll is a roll of parchment, papyrus, or paper, which has been drawn or written upon.

Scroll may also refer to:

== Art ==
- Scroll (art), an element of ornament and graphic design featuring spirals and rolling incomplete circle motifs, often based on plants
  - Scrollwork, ornament dominated by scrolls (motifs), found in a variety of artistic media
- Scroll painting, a painting on a scroll (media) in Asian traditions, distinguishing between:
  - Handscroll, such a painting in horizontal format
  - Hanging scroll, such a painting in vertical format

== News ==
- Scroll.in, an Indian news website

== Web services ==
- Scroll (web service), a web service that disables ads on partner websites in exchange for a subscription fee

== Other ==
- Scroll (music), the decoratively curved end of the pegbox of string instruments such as violins
- Scrolling (video and computing), the continuous movement of text/graphics over a video screen or display window
  - on touchscreens, a single or multi-touch gesture, done by swiping one's finger(s) vertically
- Scroll, a ruled surface in a rational normal scroll in algebraic geometry
- Scroll, a traditional pattern used in Danish pastry
- Scroll, a Japanese film starring Takumi Kitamura and Taishi Nakagawa
- Scroll pump (engineering), a type of rotary positive displacement pump

== See also ==
- Scrolls (video game), a video game by Mojang
- The Scrolls, an American musical octet
