= WVKL =

Radio station in Norfolk, Virginia

- Norfolk, Virginia; United States
- Broadcast area: Hampton Roads
- Frequency: 95.7 MHz (HD Radio)
- Branding: 95-7 R&B

Programming
- Language: English
- Format: Urban adult contemporary
- Subchannels: HD2: The Bet (sports gambling)
- Affiliations: Premiere Networks; Westwood One

Ownership
- Owner: Audacy, Inc.; (Audacy License, LLC)
- Sister stations: WNVZ; WPTE; WWDE-FM

History
- First air date: September 21, 1961
- Former call signs: WTAR-FM (1961–1977); WKEZ (1977–1982); WLTY (1981–1997); WVCL (1997–1998)
- Call sign meaning: former "Virginia Kool" branding

Technical information
- Licensing authority: FCC
- Facility ID: 4672
- Class: B
- ERP: 40,000 watts
- HAAT: 268 meters (879 ft)
- Transmitter coordinates: 36°48′56.5″N 76°27′58.8″W

Links
- Public license information: Public file; LMS
- Webcast: Listen live (via Audacy); Listen live (via Audacy) (HD2)
- Website: www.audacy.com/957rnb/

WVKL (95.7 FM) is a commercial urban adult contemporary radio station licensed Norfolk, Virginia, United States. Owned by Audacy, Inc., the station services the Hampton Roads region, and is the market affiliate for The Steve Harvey Morning Show. The WVKL studios are located in Virginia Beach, while the station transmitter resides in nearby Suffolk. In addition to a standard analog transmission, WVKL broadcasts over two HD Radio digital subchannels, and is available online via audacy.com.

== History ==
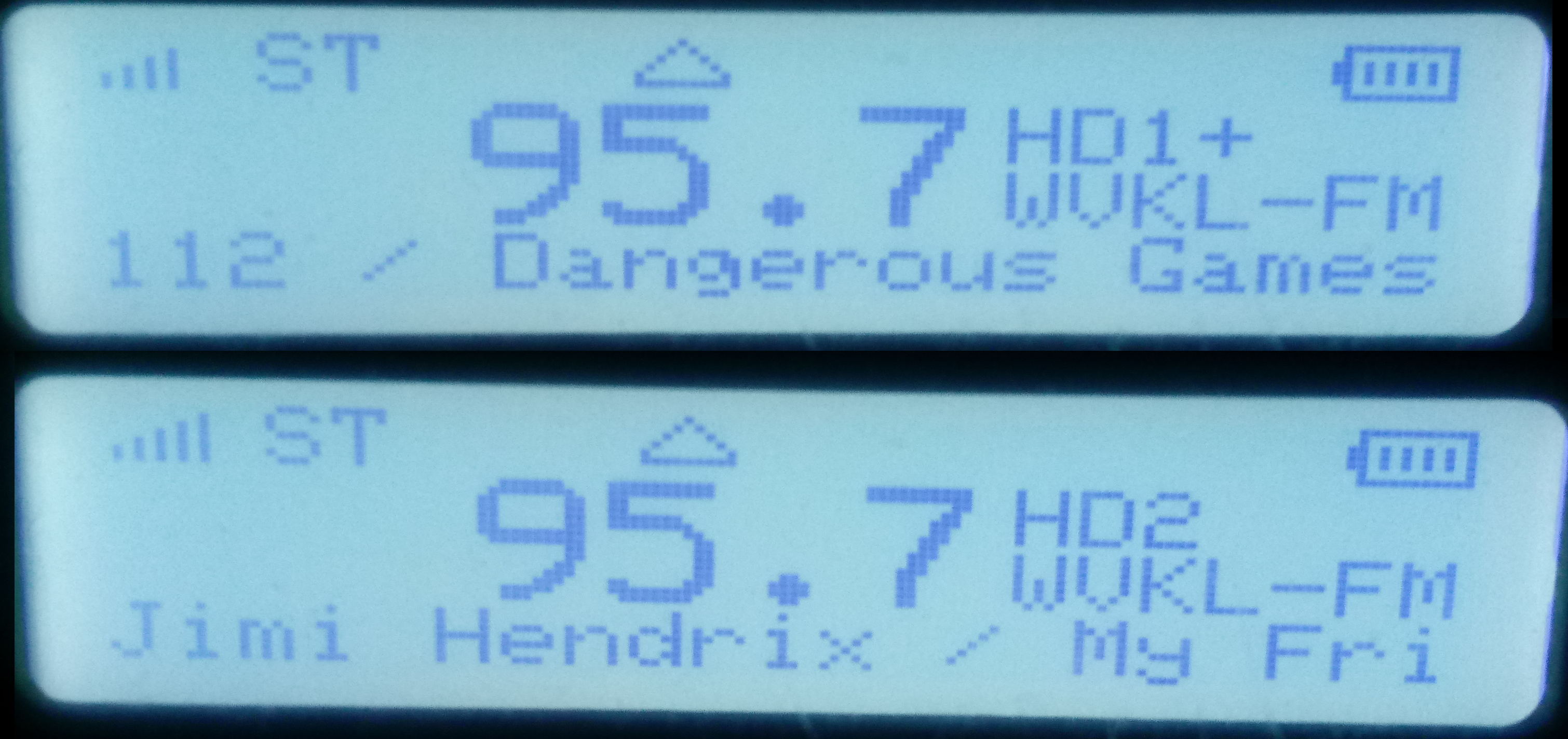
WVKL's HD Radio Channels on a SPARC Radio with PSD and EAS.

This station began operations as WTAR-FM on September 21, 1961, owned by Norfolk Newspapers, publisher of The Virginian-Pilot and The Ledger-Star. Norfolk Newspapers also owned Virginia's first radio station, WTAR (790 AM), and the market's CBS network affiliate, WTAR-TV. There had been a previous WTAR-FM on 97.3 MHz that began broadcasting in 1948, but had ceased operations a couple of years later.

From its sign-on, WTAR-FM has had an effective radiated power of 40,000 watts, broadcasting from a tower built for WTAR-TV, giving WTAR-FM a height above average terrain of 879 feet (268 meters), which makes the station overpowered by current standards. On that tower, a Class B station should be limited to around 16,000 watts, but WVKL continues to enjoy a larger coverage area thanks to its grandfathered power.

By the early 1970s, WTAR-FM was separately programmed, airing a beautiful music format; by 1977, WTAR-FM switched its call sign to WKEZ, with the "EZ" in the call letters referring to easy listening music.

As Norfolk Newspapers began acquiring newspapers and broadcast properties in other states, it was renamed Landmark Communications, and later Landmark Media Enterprises. In the 1970s, the FCC began discouraging one company from owning a newspaper, TV station and radio stations, all in the same media market. Landmark was exempt because it owned the properties before the FCC rules went into effect, but decided to sell WTAR-TV to Knight-Ridder in 1981. WKEZ was concurrently moved to a middle of the road format as WLTY, branded The New Y96. The "LT" stood for both "Lite Music" and the slogan "We Listen To You". WLTY shifted to oldies as The New Oldies 96 in May 1989, and then later as Oldies 95.7.

In 1993, Benchmark Communications spent $4.5 million to buy both WLTY and WTAR.

In May 1996, Benchmark sold WLTY to Susquehanna Radio Corp. for $6.5 million.

In March 1997, Susquehanna sold WLTY to Heritage Media Corp., which changed WLTY's call letters to WVCL and re-branded as "Cool 95." The following year, the call sign was modified to WVKL, so instead of "Cool", it became "Kool 95.7."

In February 1998, the Sinclair Broadcast Group acquired WVKL following their acquisition of stations from Heritage. In December 1999, the station was bought by Entercom. On January 9, 2001, WVKL switched to its current urban AC format. Entercom has guided WVKL to becoming one of the top stations in the Norfolk-Virginia Beach-Newport News radio market.

On February 23, 2022, WVKL added The Bet to its HD3 subchannel.
