= Enclosure (disambiguation) =

Enclosure was the legal process in England of enclosing a number of small landholdings to create one larger farm.

Enclosure or enclosed may also refer to:

== Land ==
- Enclosure, an enclosed area of agricultural land; see Field
- Enclosure (archaeology), an area of land separated from surrounding land by earthworks, walls, or fencing

== Structures ==
- Container, device creating a partially or fully enclosed space
- Enclosure castle, a defended residence or stronghold

=== Animal confinement ===
- Pen (enclosure), an enclosure for holding animals
- Cage, an enclosure often made of mesh, bars or wires, used to confine, contain or protect something or someone
- Paddock, a small enclosure for horses
- Pasture, land used for grazing

=== Engineering ===
- Housing (engineering), enclosures for components, machinery
- Enclosure (electrical), a cabinet for electrical or electronic equipment
- Computer enclosure or computer case
- 3D printer enclosure, encapsulation that can provide better control of the environment around a 3D printer
- Loudspeaker enclosure, the box containing a loudspeaker system
- Disk enclosure, a specialized chassis designed to hold and power disk drives

== Music ==
- Enclosure (Merzbow album), 1987
- Enclosure (John Frusciante album), 2014
- "Enclosure", a song from the album Metal Gear Solid Original Game Soundtrack
- Enclosure (jazz), a technique in jazz compositions

== Other uses ==
- RSS enclosure, a pointer to a media file from a web feed
- Enclosure, a document or item accompanying a letter
- The Enclosure, a 1961 novel by Susan Hill
- Enclosure (film), a 1961 film
- Enclosure Historic District, a historic district located in Nutley, Essex County, New Jersey, United States
- Digital enclosure, a model of interrogating the relationship that has arisen between surveillance and the new emerging interactive economy

== See also ==
- Enclosed religious orders, religious orders separated from the external world
- Oppidum, a large fortified Iron Age settlement
- Cloister (from Latin claustrum, "enclosure"), a feature running along the walls of buildings forming a quadrangle
- Close (disambiguation)
- Cover (disambiguation)
- Container (disambiguation)
- Receptacle (disambiguation)
- Wrap (disambiguation)
