= WGH (AM) =

- Newport News, Virginia; United States
- Broadcast area: Hampton Roads
- Frequency: 1310 kHz
- Branding: Fox Sports 1310 and 100.9

Programming
- Format: Sports
- Affiliations: Fox Sports Radio; Navy Midshipmen football

Ownership
- Owner: Max Media; (MHR License LLC)
- Sister stations: WGH-FM; WTWV-FM; WVBW-FM; WVSP-FM

History
- First air date: December 6, 1926
- Former call signs: WPAB (1926–1927); WRCV (1927–1928); WIVA (1928); WNEW (1928); WGH (1928–1984); WNSY (1984); WGH (1984–2004); WCMS (2004–2005)
- Former frequencies: 940 kHz (1926–1927); 1430 kHz (1927–1928)
- Call sign meaning: "World's Greatest Harbor"

Technical information
- Licensing authority: FCC
- Facility ID: 72103
- Class: B
- Power: 20,000 watts (day); 5,000 watts (night)
- Transmitter coordinates: 37°2′43.53″N 76°26′52.81″W
- Translator: 100.9 W265EF (Newport News)
- Repeater: 94.1 WVSP-FM HD2 (Yorktown)

Links
- Public license information: Public file; LMS
- Webcast: Listen live
- Website: www.foxsportsradio1310.com

WGH (1310 AM) is a commercial radio station licensed to Newport News, Virginia, United States, and serving Hampton Roads. WGH is owned and operated by Max Media, and airs a sports format. It mostly carries shows from Fox Sports Radio and calls itself "Fox Sports 1310 and 100.9." Studios and offices are on Greenwich Road in Virginia Beach, Virginia.

WGH's transmitter is sited off of Mary Ann Drive in Hampton, just over the line from Newport News. Programming is also heard on low-power FM translator W265EF at 100.9 MHz in Newport News.

== History ==
Station WPAB was first licensed on 940 kHz on December 6, 1926. The station was assigned the call letters WGH and moved to 1310 kHz in 1928. Due to the implementation of the NARBA treaty, WGH moved to 1340 kHz in 1941, only to move back to 1310 kHz in 1948. Because it dates back to the early days of radio, WGH is the only station in Virginia to retain its three-letter call sign, although there were periods in its history when it used the call letters WNSY and WCMS. The call letters for WGH and its sister station 97.3 WGH-FM stand for "World's Greatest Harbor", a slogan for the Hampton Roads or Tidewater area of Virginia, where there is a large shipbuilding industry and both commercial and military ports. For much of the 1960s and 1970s, WGH was a popular top 40 station.

On October 5, 2009, WGH swapped formats with WXEZ (94.1 FM) and became an urban gospel station as "Star 1310". On July 28, 2017, WGH switched to a format of 1950s-1960s oldies.

On February 28, 2019, WGH changed its format from oldies to urban talk and urban oldies, branded as "1310 The Power".

On June 15, 2020, WGH changed its format to business talk, branded as "Money Talk".

On January 6, 2023, WGH changed its format from business talk to sports, branded as "Fox Sports 1310".

WGH is an affiliate of the Navy Midshipmen football radio network for the benefit of personnel stationed at Naval Station Norfolk.

== Translator ==
Call sign	Frequency	City of license	FID	ERP (W)	Class	Transmitter coordinates	FCC info
W265EF	100.9 FM	Newport News, Virginia	202208	250	D	36°50′28.80″N 76°8′9.4″W	LMS

== See also ==
- List of three-letter broadcast call signs in the United States
