= WGH-FM =

Radio station in Newport News, Virginia

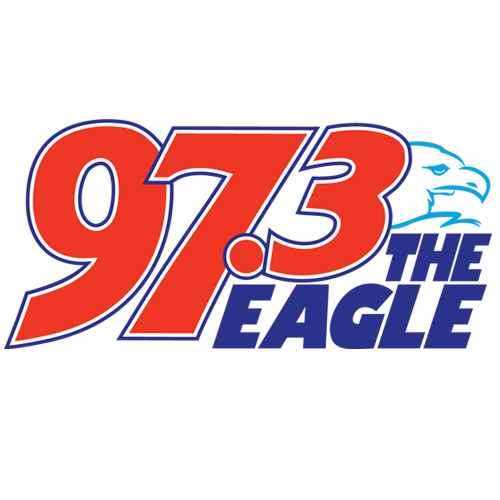
- Newport News, Virginia; United States
- Broadcast area: Hampton Roads
- Frequency: 97.3 MHz (HD Radio)
- Branding: 97.3 The Eagle

Programming
- Format: Country
- Subchannels: HD2: Business talk

Ownership
- Owner: Max Media; (MHR License, LLC)
- Sister stations: WGH; WTWV-FM; WVBW-FM; WVSP-FM

History
- First air date: November 1948
- Former call signs: WGH-FM (1948–1983); WNSY (1983–1985); WRSR (1985–1986)
- Former frequencies: 96.5 MHz (1948–1955)
- Call sign meaning: "World's Greatest Harbor"

Technical information
- Licensing authority: FCC
- Facility ID: 72102
- Class: B
- ERP: 74,000 watts
- HAAT: 120 meters (390 ft)
- Transmitter coordinates: 36°57′47.5″N 76°24′40.8″W

Links
- Public license information: Public file; LMS
- Webcast: Listen live
- Website: 973eagle.com

WGH-FM (97.3 FM) is a commercial radio station licensed to Newport News, Virginia, United States, serving Hampton Roads. WGH-FM is owned and operated by Max Media and airs a country music radio format. It uses the branding "97.3 The Eagle".

Studios and offices are on Greenwich Road in Virginia Beach, Virginia. The transmitter is sited on Newport News Point, near Interstate 664.

== History ==
WGH-FM first signed on the air in November 1948, one of the first FM stations in Virginia. It broadcasts at 74,000 watts in an area of the country where today the maximum power for FM radio stations should be 50,000 watts. But, because the station dates back to 1948, before the Federal Communications Commission set rules for FM power levels, it is grandfathered at the higher power.

The call letters for WGH-FM and its sister station WGH (1310 AM) stand for "World's Greatest Harbor", a slogan for the Hampton Roads or Tidewater area of Virginia, where there is a large shipbuilding industry and both commercial and military ports. WGH and WGH-FM are the only stations in Virginia to operate with three-letter call signs.

For many years in its early days, WGH-FM was a classical music station. On September 1, 1983, after Commcor bought the station, the classical format was abruptly dropped and flipped to soft rock as WNSY-FM, "Sunny 97". A year later, it flipped to top 40 as "Y-97". The next year, after Susquehanna Broadcasting took over, the station changed call letters to WRSR and rebranded as "97 Star" during the week of September 10, 1985, while keeping the current format. The WGH-FM calls would return on December 15, 1986.

On August 29, 1990, the top 40 format was dropped and the station began stunting with all-Elvis Presley. On September 3, at noon, it flipped to its current country format as "Eagle 97.3".

== See also ==
- List of three-letter broadcast call signs in the United States
