= WGPL =

Radio station in Portsmouth, Virginia

- Portsmouth, Virginia; United States
- Broadcast area: Hampton Roads
- Frequency: 1350 kHz
- Branding: Peace Radio 1350

Programming
- Format: Black gospel

Ownership
- Owner: Friendship Cathedral Family Worship Center, Inc.
- Sister stations: WPCE

History
- First air date: March 1943
- Former call signs: WSAP (1943–1953); WAVY (1953–1968); WCVU (1968–1970); WKLX (1970–1977); WHNE (1977–1979); WNIS (1979–1987); WRAP (1987–1989); WBSK (1989–1993); WSVY (1993–1996)
- Former frequencies: 1490 kHz (1943–1951)
- Call sign meaning: "Gospel"

Technical information
- Licensing authority: FCC
- Facility ID: 69560
- Class: B
- Power: 5,000 watts
- Transmitter coordinates: 36°53′0.5″N 76°22′20.8″W

Links
- Public license information: Public file; LMS
- Webcast: Listen live

WGPL is a black gospel formatted broadcast radio station licensed to Portsmouth, Virginia, serving Hampton Roads. WGPL is owned and operated by Friendship Cathedral Family Worship Center, Inc.

== History ==
The station began broadcasting as WSAP in February 1943 as a Mutual affiliate. It operated on 1490 kHz with 250 watts of power from 6 a.m. to 2 a.m. As WAVY in the 1950s and 1960s, the station competed against cross-town WGH with a top 40 music format until 1962. In the early 1970s the station competed against WGH and WNOR with a top 40 format as WCVU and WKLX.

=== WRAP ===
From 1979 until 1987, the station's call sign was WNIS. At that point, a swap was made with AM 850, which moved the WNIS call sign to AM 850, and transferred the WRAP call letters, with its associated black-oriented format, to this station.

This was the last of the three Hampton Roads radio stations to operate as WRAP. In 1989, the station was sold to Three Chiefs Broadcasting, which changed the call sign to WBSK, and fired most of the existing staff.
