= WRAP (Norfolk) =

Radio stations in Hampton Roads, Virginia (1952–1989)

- Norfolk, Virginia; United States
- Broadcast area: Tidewater region
- Frequencies: 1050 kHz (1952–1954); 850 kHz (1954–1987); 1350 kHz (1987–1989)

Programming
- Format: Defunct (was R&B/soul music/black gospel)

Ownership
- Owner: Rollins Broadcasting

History
- First air date: September 1952
- Call sign meaning: Wicked RAP (an African-American English word for "talk" or "discussion" as for a new musical genre)

Technical information
- Power: 500 watts daytime only (1952–1954); 5,000 watts days 1,000 watts nights (1954–1987); 5,000 watts full-time (1987–1989)
- Transmitter coordinates: 36°51′40″N 76°21′12″W

WRAP was an historic radio call sign, that was transferred, along with a black-oriented format, between three Hampton Roads stations from 1952 until 1989. WRAP began as one of only a handful of American radio stations broadcasting full-time to the African American community, featuring R&B, soul music and black gospel, along with news and talk programs. Communities that were served included Portsmouth, Newport News, Hampton and Virginia Beach.

== Format ==
The call sign WRAP was used as an identifier for the three Hampton Roads Virginia radio stations that operated at various times with the WRAP format. "Rap" is an African-American English word for "talk" or "discussion". WRAP aired a mix of music, Religious shows, black college football games, and programming for homemakers. It was best known for playing R&B and Rock 'N' Roll in the 1950s, and for its funk and soul hits in the 1960s and the 1970s, and then in the 1980s, H.J. Ellison became the first deejay to host a show devoted to a new type of music called hip-hop in Afternoon Drive at WRAP.

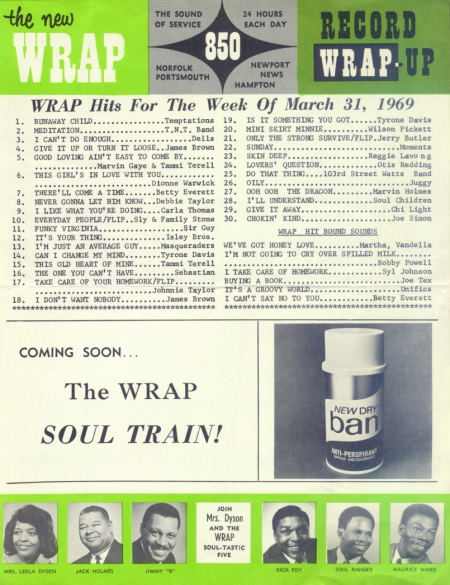
March 31, 1969 station survey, captioned: "Mrs. Dyson and the WRAP Soul-Tastic Five" (Pictured DJs: Leola Dyson, Jack Holmes, Jimmy "B" Van Dunn, Rick Foy, Soul Ranger and Maurice Ward)

== Disc Jockeys ==
WRAP's first three full-time black disc jockeys were Robert "Bob" King, Milton "Milt" Nixon, and Oliver Allen.

WRAP's most popular deejay was Jackson "Big Daddy Jack" Holmes. Born in 1915 in Merchantville, New Jersey, outside Philadelphia, Jack began his radio career at WLOW in Portsmouth in September 1949. Within a few years, Jack had developed a devoted following in the area. And then in the late 1950s Jack joined the WRAP staff and became their most prominent deejay.

Other popular deejays at WRAP over the years were Jay Dee Jackson, Frankie "The WRAP Soul Ranger" Stewart, Throckmortan "Gosh Oh Gee" Quiff, Maurice Ward, H.J. Ellison, William "Bill" Boykins, Chester Benton, Alvin Reaves, Calvin "Shakespeare" Perkins, with Calvin Cooke, and Leola Dyson. One of the first black female radio deejays in the country, Dyson directed public relations for WRAP and performed on the air for more than twenty years.

== Reunion ==
WRAP staffers came together for a reunion in 2003, organized by Chester Benton and Bill Boykins.

== History ==
=== AM 1050 (1952–1954) ===
The WRAP call sign and associated format premiered on September 21, 1952 as a new station on 1050 kHz, which was limited to only operate from local sunrise until sunset. It joined a select few radio stations across the country that aimed to reach black audiences, including WDIA in Memphis, founded in 1948, WVON in Chicago and WERD in Atlanta, the first radio station to be owned by an African American. "Negro-oriented" radio stations, which later became known as black-oriented stations, featured mostly black DJs and targeted African American audiences with recordings by black artists and advertising aimed at black consumers.

The station broadcast with only 500 watts by day, and had to sign-off at night to avoid interfering with clear-channel station XEG in Monterrey, Mexico. Nearly all broadcast properties in that era, even black-oriented radio stations, were white-owned, including WRAP. WRAP was a subsidiary of Rollins Broadcasting, owned by local businessmen John W. Rollins, who served as president, and O. Wayne Rollins, the vice president. It would be several decades before the Federal Communications Commission issued rules that encouraged minorities to own and operate broadcasting outlets.

As early as 1953, a newspaper article described WRAP as "the only station in the Tidewater area of Virginia which beams its programs exclusively to a Negro audience." An early station slogan that appeared in newspaper advertisements declared that the station played the "Music That Belongs to America."

=== AM 850 (1954–1987) ===
In 1954, the WRAP call letters and format were transferred to the former WCAV, which was also moved from AM 860 to AM 850. The change in frequency allowed it to broadcast around the clock with more power, 5,000 watts by day and 1,000 watts at night. An advertisement in the 1957 edition of Broadcasting Yearbook, using the descriptions of the era, said "Survey figures show the most Negroes in the Norfolk area listen most to WRAP." It added that WRAP, at 850 kilocycles, was "the only all-Negro station in Norfolk."

In December 1978, five African American WRAP DJs joined together and asked the station's white management for raises. They were summarily fired. One of the DJs, Randy Williams, managed to issue an on-air "statement of solidarity" in protest of the firings before he was forced to leave the station. The next month, "The WRAP Fired Five" organized a public rally to protest WRAP. They called for African Americans in the area to boycott the station, citing both the unfair firings and the management's deeper insensitivity to the black community's needs.

=== AM 1350 (1987–1989) ===
In 1986, a local cable television company, Clinton Cablevision, bought WRAP on AM 850. Two years later, the cable company changed AM 850's call sign to WNIS, a news/talk station. WRAP's call letters and R&B format moved to AM 1350 in nearby Portsmouth. That station was owned by a Philadelphia-based black businessman, Ragan Henry, who also owned urban radio stations in Kansas City and Tampa.

In 1989, AM 1350 changed its ownership to Three Chiefs Broadcasting, and the call sign was switched to WBSK, and the WRAP call letters disappeared from the Hampton Roads area, after they were sold to a North Carolina broadcaster. Shortly thereafter, the new management at WBSK fired fifteen employees – many of them longtime WRAP personalities – without any warning. The WBSK management justified these actions by arguing that the staffers had not yet completed a 90-day probationary period they had started at the station and were thus subject to termination without notice. The station switched to a gospel music format.
