= WTAR =

Radio station in Norfolk, Virginia

- Norfolk, Virginia; United States
- Broadcast area: Hampton Roads
- Frequency: 850 kHz
- Branding: TalkRadio 96.5 & 850 WTAR

Programming
- Language: English
- Format: Talk radio
- Affiliations: Fox News Radio; Premiere Networks; Red Apple Media

Ownership
- Owner: Sinclair Telecable, Inc.
- Sister stations: WNIS; WNOB; WROX-FM; WUSH

History
- First air date: November 30, 1947
- Former call signs: WCAV (1947–1954); WRAP (1954–1987); WNIS (1987–1997)
- Former frequencies: 860 kHz (1947–1950)
- Call sign meaning: derived from older WTAR; sequentially assigned

Technical information
- Licensing authority: FCC
- Facility ID: 60472
- Class: B
- Power: 50,000 watts (day); 25,000 watts (night)
- Transmitter coordinates: 37°3′36.5″N 76°41′24.8″W
- Translator: See § Translators
- Repeater: 106.1 WUSH-HD2 (Poquoson)

Links
- Public license information: Public file; LMS
- Webcast: Listen live
- Website: wtar.com

WTAR (850 kHz) is a commercial AM radio station licensed to Norfolk, Virginia, United States, and serving the Hampton Roads. Owned by Sinclair Telecable, Inc., its studios and offices are on Waterside Drive in Norfolk. WTAR broadcasts a talk radio format branded as "TalkRadio 96.5 & 850 WTAR".

The station's transmitter site is off Track Lane in Smithfield, Virginia. WTAR uses a directional antenna at all times. It runs at 50,000 watts by day, the highest power permitted by the Federal Communications Commission for AM stations. At night, to reduce interference to other stations on 850 AM, mainly Class A KOA in Denver, WTAR reduces power to 25,000 watts, concentrating the signal in Norfolk, Virginia Beach, Hampton and Newport News.

WTAR programming is also heard on HD Radio over 106.1 WUSH-HD2 and on FM translator stations W243DJ at 96.5 MHz in Norfolk and W243EK at 96.5 MHz in Hampton.

== History ==
=== WCAV ===
The station signed on the air on November 30, 1947. It originally broadcast on 860 kilocycles and the call sign was WCAV. It was owned by the Cavalier Broadcasting Company with studios in the Helena Building.

=== WRAP ===
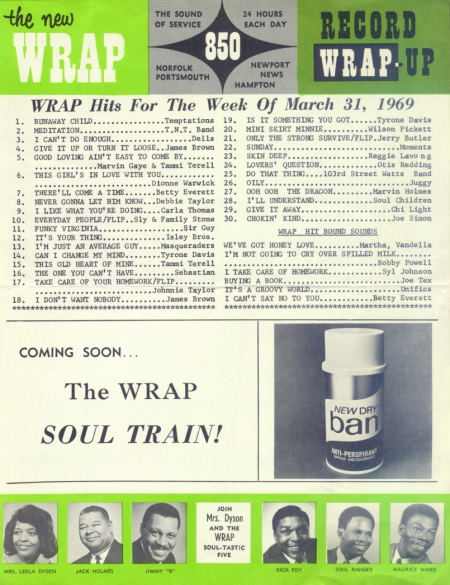
From 1954 until 1987, this station operated as WRAP, with its associated black-oriented format.

In 1954, owners of another Norfolk radio station, WRAP on 1050 kHz, acquired WCAV, moving it to 850 kHz. They changed the call letters to WRAP, adopting a black-oriented format. On this new frequency, WRAP programming could broadcast around the clock after it was restricted to daytime only on 1050 kHz. The daytime power was increased to 5,000 watts and the nighttime power was set at 1,000 watts.

WRAP was programmed to Norfolk's African-American community. Its call sign used the word "RAP", an African-American English word for "talk" or "discussion". (It would be several decades before "rap" began referring to a musical style.) An advertisement in the 1957 edition of Broadcasting Yearbook, using the descriptions of the era, said "Survey figures show the most Negroes in the Norfolk area listen most to WRAP". It added that WRAP was "the only all-Negro station in Norfolk".

=== WNIS ===
In 1987, WNIS on AM 1350 was acquired by local cable TV company Clinton Cablevision (later Sinclair Telecable). The new owner flipped the format to talk. A swap was made with AM 1350, which moved the WNIS call sign to this station, and transferred the WRAP call letters, with its associated black-oriented format, to AM 1350.

WNIS, meaning "News and Information Station", picked up programming from ABC Talkradio, NBC Talknet and the Mutual Broadcasting System's Larry King Show.

=== WTAR ===
On July 15, 1997, WNIS and its sister station on AM 790, WTAR, exchanged call letters, with AM 790 becoming WNIS, while WTAR was moved to 850 kHz. 850 has the stronger signal, broadcasting at 50,000 watts by day, the highest power authorized for AM stations by the Federal Communications Commission. At night it runs 25,000 watts, while 790 kHz transmits 5,000 watts day and night. Both stations had talk formats. With the switch, 850 AM inherited the legacy of Virginia's oldest radio station; WTAR had signed on in 1923.

WTAR flipped from talk radio to an all-sports format on February 5, 2006. On September 15, 2017, WTAR began simulcasting on WUSH-HD2 and FM translator station W243DJ at 96.5 MHz in Norfolk. The move allows WTAR listeners to hear the station on either AM or FM, although the FM translator signal is limited to Norfolk and surrounding communities due to its low power of 120 watts. The station also signed on another low-powered FM translator, W243EK in Hampton (on the same frequency of W243DJ), to improve its nighttime signal on the Lower Peninsula and the Hampton Roads Bridge–Tunnel's AM/FM rebroadcast system.

On September 1, 2022, WTAR dropped its sports format and began stunting with a loop of Justin Timberlake's "SexyBack" (as well as construction sound effects). (However, on September 3, WTAR broke from the stunt to air a University of Virginia football game against Richmond; the 96.5 translators remained on the stunt during that time). On September 6, WTAR and its translators flipped to hot adult contemporary, branded as "96.5 Lucy FM", modeled after its sister station in Austin, Texas. The 850 AM signal continues to break away from "Lucy FM" programming for the University of Virginia broadcasts.

Until September 1, 2022, the station aired a sports radio format. It carried Fox Sports Radio most of the day, with a local afternoon drive time show. The syndicated Dan Patrick Show was heard in late mornings. WTAR was part of the Washington Commanders Radio Network.

On March 20, 2023, WTAR flipped to adult album alternative (AAA), calling itself "96.5 The Coast". The format change returned the "Coast" branding to the market for the first time since WKOC's flip in 2003.

On September 3, 2024, the station's owner, Sinclair Communications, announced that it would flip WTAR and its two translators to conservative talk radio "Talkradio 96.5/850" on Monday, September 16. It added a local talk and interview morning show, along with syndicated conservative hosts the rest of the day.

== Programming ==
Weekdays begin with Kerry and Mike, a local talk and interview show hosted by Kerry Dougherty and Mike Imprevento. The rest of the weekday schedule is nationally syndicated conservative shows: The Glenn Beck Radio Program, Fox Across America with Jimmy Failla, The Guy Benson Show, The Jesse Kelly Show, The Michael Berry Show, Our American Stories with Lee Habeeb and The Other Side of Midnight with Lionel.

Weekends feature specialty shows on money, technology, home repair and religion. Syndicated weekend shows include: Rich DeMuro on Tech, The Larry Kudlow Show, The James Golden Show, The Weekend with Michael Brown, The Judge Jeanine Pirro Show, At Home with Gary Sullivan, The Brett Baier Show, The Jesus Christ Show with Neil Saavedra and Somewhere in Time with Art Bell. Most hours began with an update from now-defunct CBS News Radio.

== Translators ==
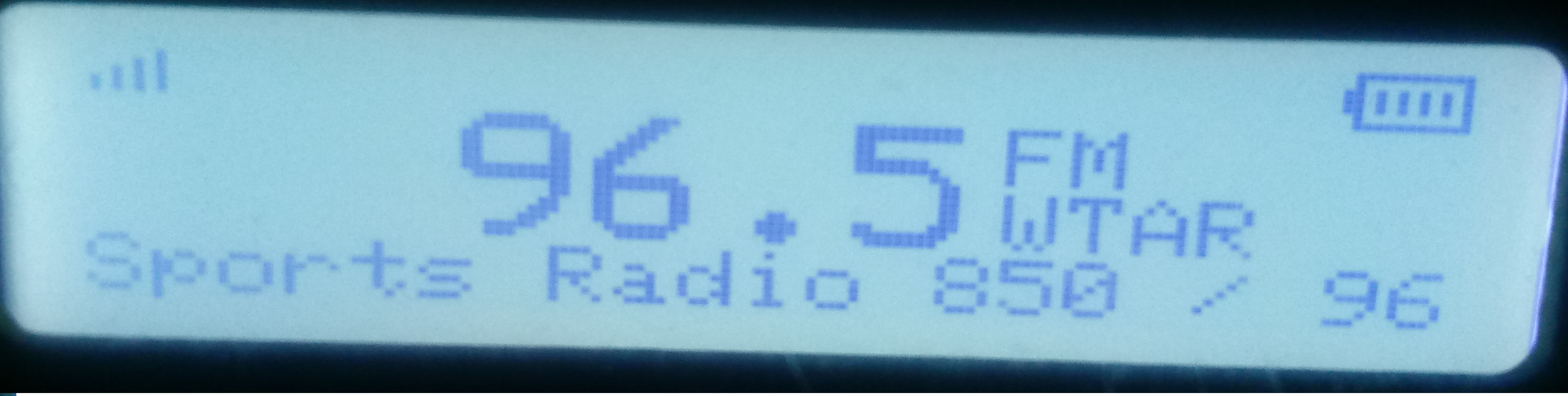
WTAR Translator on a SPARC HD Radio with RDS.

Broadcast translator for WUSH-HD2
Call sign	Frequency	City of license	FID	ERP (W)	HAAT	Class	Transmitter coordinates	FCC info
W243DJ	96.5 FM	Norfolk, Virginia	141072	120	131 m (430 ft)	D	36°49′44″N 76°12′26″W	LMS

Broadcast translator for WTAR
Call sign	Frequency	City of license	FID	ERP (W)	HAAT	Class	Transmitter coordinates	FCC info
W243EK	96.5 FM	Hampton, Virginia	203167	165	119 m (390 ft)	D	37°4′42″N 76°26′47″W	LMS
