= WHBT-FM =

Radio station in Moyock, North Carolina

- Moyock, North Carolina; United States
- Broadcast area: Hampton Roads; Northeastern North Carolina
- Frequency: 92.1 MHz (HD Radio)
- Branding: Norfolk’s BIN 92.1

Programming
- Format: Black-oriented news
- Affiliations: Premiere Networks

Ownership
- Owner: iHeartMedia; (iHM Licenses, LLC)
- Sister stations: WMOV-FM, WNOH, WOWI

History
- First air date: October 17, 1974
- Former call signs: WJLY (1974–1979); WQZQ (1979–1990); WOFM (1990); WTZR (1990–1991); WMYK (1991–1997); WSVV (1997–2001); WBHH (2001–2004); WCDG (2004–2010); WKSA (2010–2015)
- Call sign meaning: "Hampton Roads Beat" (former branding)

Technical information
- Licensing authority: FCC
- Facility ID: 70345
- Class: C3
- ERP: 14,500 watts
- HAAT: 131 meters (430 ft)
- Transmitter coordinates: 36°37′38.0″N 76°13′7.0″W

Links
- Public license information: Public file; LMS
- Webcast: Listen live (via iHeartRadio)
- Website: norfolk.binnews.com

WHBT-FM (92.1 MHz) is a Black-oriented news formatted broadcast radio station licensed to Moyock, North Carolina, serving Hampton Roads and Northeastern North Carolina. WHBT-FM is owned and operated by iHeartMedia. WHBT-FM broadcasts in the HD Radio (hybrid) format.

== History ==
The station originally signed on October 17, 1974, as WJLY, which played a variety of genres, but signed off in 1978 due to financial issues. It signed back on as Top 40-formatted WQZQ in 1989. It later changed to country, adult contemporary as WOFM and AAA formats. On July 16, 1990, it flipped to the satellite-fed Z-Rock network as WTZR.

In June 1991, the station was sold to Willis Broadcasting who changed the calls to WMYK and instituted an urban AC format as "92.1 Kiss FM". On August 9, 1996, after Clear Channel purchased the station, WMYK flipped to a Crossover format, which failed in the ratings; after this, the format shifted to a harder-edged urban as “K92". On July 3, 1997, WMYK flipped to a simulcast of sister station WSVY, which aired a Jammin' Oldies format, and was branded as "Vibe 107.7 and 92.1". The format would later shift back to their urban AC roots. On February 1, 2001, 92.1 split from the simulcast and returned to urban as WBHH, "92.1 The Beat". On March 1, 2003, the station dropped its hip hop format and started simulcasting a soft AC format with former smooth jazz sister station WJCD; the two stations together were known as "Lite FM", and WBHH adopted the call letters WCDG on March 9, 2004.

On August 12, 2005, to fill the hole left when crosstown oldies WFOG switched to adult contemporary the month prior, WCDG broke away from the simulcast and became oldies-formatted "Cool 92.1". The first song played was Bill Deal and the Rhondels' "What Kind of Fool (Do You Think I Am)".

On October 11, 2010, WCDG and WJCD became simulcasts again when WKUS moved from 105.3 to 107.7 and the 105.3 frequency became "Magic 105.3" with an AC-themed classic hits format. The move meant the end for WCDG's oldies format and WJCD's smooth jazz format. On October 27, 2010, WCDG changed their call letters to WKSA. On March 31, 2011, WKUS broke away from its simulcast of WKSA to become rhythmic AC WMOV (MOViN' 107.7) after that station received a signal upgrade to cover the area.

On December 26, 2014, at 10 a.m., WKSA began stunting as "Missy FM," featuring music recorded by Portsmouth-born artist Missy Elliott, who also did imaging and voice overs, as well as Timbaland and Aaliyah. On January 5, 2015, at 9 a.m., WKSA flipped to classic hip hop and returned to the "Beat" branding. On January 22, 2015, WKSA changed their call letters to WHBT-FM to match the "Beat" branding.

On July 25, 2025, WHBT-FM flipped to all-news as "BIN 92.1". The format moved from WNOH, which began stunting with Christmas music en route to a flip to soft adult contemporary as "The Breeze".
