= WNVZ =

Rhythmic contemporary radio station in Norfolk, Virginia

- Norfolk, Virginia; United States
- Broadcast area: Hampton Roads
- Frequency: 104.5 MHz (HD Radio)
- Branding: Z104

Programming
- Language: English
- Format: Rhythmic contemporary
- Subchannels: HD2: Channel Q

Ownership
- Owner: Audacy, Inc.; (Audacy License, LLC)
- Sister stations: WPTE; WVKL; WWDE-FM

History
- First air date: July 1967
- Former call signs: WTID-FM (1967–72); WQRK (1973–81)
- Call sign meaning: Norfolk, Virginia, Z

Technical information
- Licensing authority: FCC
- Facility ID: 40755
- Class: B
- ERP: 49,000 watts
- HAAT: 146 meters (479 ft)
- Transmitter coordinates: 37°2′18.0″N 76°18′29.0″W

Links
- Public license information: Public file; LMS
- Webcast: Listen live (via Audacy)
- Website: www.audacy.com/z104

WNVZ (104.5 FM "Z104") is a commercial radio station licensed to Norfolk, Virginia, serving Hampton Roads. WNVZ is owned and operated by Audacy, Inc. It airs a rhythmic contemporary radio format.

The studios and offices are at Audacy's Hampton Roads headquarters on Clearfield Avenue in Virginia Beach. The transmitter tower is off East Pembroke Avenue in Hampton.

== History ==
The station first signed on in July 1967 as WTID-FM. It was the FM sister station of WTID (1270 AM, now WPMH) in nearby Newport News. (The TID call letters stood for "TIDewater", another name for the Hampton Roads section of Virginia.) For much of its history, 104.5 was a Contemporary Hits/Top 40 radio station, picking up the format in 1973 as WQRK. In August 1982, it subscribed to noted programmer Mike Joseph's "Hot Hits" format, as WNVZ, playing only songs from the current Top 40 charts. Through the 1990s and early 2000s, it leaned toward a more rhythmic contemporary direction. In 2015, it moved back to a more mainstream Top 40 approach. After failing to make impacts with the return to CHR, mostly staying below a 3 share, the station quietly returned to a rhythmic CHR format in the summer of 2023.

WNVZ's morning show originated the Unexpected John Cena meme, where a snippet of a popular film, TV series, song or other form of media is interrupted by John Cena's entrance video and song, often played loudly.
