= List of television stations in Indiana =

This is a list of broadcast television stations that are licensed in the U.S. state of Indiana.

== Full-power ==
- Stations are arranged by media market served and channel position.

Full-power television stations in Indiana
Media market	Station	Channel	Primary affiliation(s)	Notes	Refs
Evansville	WTVW	7	The CW		
Evansville	WNIN	9	PBS		
Evansville	WFIE	14	NBC		
Evansville	WEHT	25	ABC		
Evansville	WEVV-TV	44	CBS, Fox/MyNetworkTV on 44.2		
Fort Wayne	WINM	12	TCT	(Note: Licensed to Angola, Indiana.)	
Fort Wayne	WANE-TV	15	CBS		
Fort Wayne	WPTA	21	ABC, NBC on 21.2, MyNetworkTV on 21.3		
Fort Wayne	WISE-TV	33	The CW		
Fort Wayne	WFWA	39	PBS		
Fort Wayne	WFFT-TV	55	Fox		
Indianapolis	WTTV	4	CBS, Independent on 4.2	(Note: Licensed to Bloomington, Indiana.)	
Indianapolis	WRTV	6	ABC		
Indianapolis	WISH-TV	8	The CW		
Indianapolis	WTHR	13	NBC		
Indianapolis	WFYI	20	PBS		
Indianapolis	WNDY-TV	23	MyNetworkTV	(Note: Licensed to Marion, Indiana.)	
Indianapolis	WTTK	29	CBS	(Note: Licensed to Kokomo, Indiana.) (Note: Satellite of WTTV.)	
Indianapolis	WTIU	30	PBS		
Indianapolis	WHMB-TV	40	Univision		
Indianapolis	WCLJ-TV	42	Bounce TV		
Indianapolis	WIPB	49	PBS	(Note: Licensed to Muncie, Indiana.)	
Indianapolis	WXIN	59	Fox		
Indianapolis	WIPX-TV	63	Ion Television		
Indianapolis	WDTI	69	Daystar		
Lafayette	WLFI-TV	18	CBS, The CW on 18.2		
South Bend	WNDU-TV	16	NBC		
South Bend	WSBT-TV	22	CBS, Fox on 22.2		
South Bend	WSJV	28	Heroes & Icons	(Note: Licensed to Elkhart, Indiana.)	
South Bend	WNIT	34	PBS		
South Bend	WHME-TV	46	Univision		
Terre Haute	WTWO	2	NBC, The CW on 2.2		
Terre Haute	WTHI-TV	10	CBS, Fox/MyNetworkTV on 10.2		
Terre Haute	WVUT	22	PBS	(Note: Licensed to Vincennes, Indiana.)	
Terre Haute	WAWV-TV	38	ABC		
~Chicago, IL	WPWR-TV	50	MyNetworkTV	(Note: Licensed to Gary, Indiana.)	
~Chicago, IL	WYIN-TV	56	PBS		
~Chicago, IL	WJYS	62	Independent	(Note: Licensed to Hammond, Indiana.)	
~Louisville, KY	WBKI	58	The CW, MyNetworkTV on 58.3	(Note: Licensed to Salem, Indiana.)	
~Dayton, OH	WKOI-TV	43	Ion Television	(Note: Licensed to Richmond, Indiana.)	

== Low-power ==
Low-power television stations in Indiana
Media market	Station	Channel	Primary affiliation(s)	Notes	Refs
Evansville	WZDS-LD	5	Heroes & Icons		
Evansville	W06DG-D	6	[Blank]		
Evansville	W10DG-D	10	[Blank]		
Evansville	WYYW-CD	15	Telemundo		
Evansville	WJTS-CD	18	Youtoo America	(Note: Licensed to Jasper, Indiana.)	
Evansville	W19EW-D	19	[Blank]		
Evansville	WTSN-CD	20	Antenna TV		
Evansville	W23BV-D	23	3ABN		
Evansville	WDLH-LD	24	Various		
Evansville	WELW-LD	30	Various		
Evansville	WEIN-LD	40	Various		
Evansville	WEEV-LD	47	Fox/MyNetworkTV		
Fort Wayne	WLMO-LD	2	Various		
Fort Wayne	WCUH-LD	16	Various		
Fort Wayne	W22FH-D	22	[Blank]		
Fort Wayne	W26DH-D	26	3ABN	(Note: Licensed to Auburn, Indiana.)	
Fort Wayne	W30EH-D	41	Infomercials		
Fort Wayne	W25FH-D	43	Various		
Fort Wayne	WFWC-CD	45	Various		
Fort Wayne	WODP-LD	49	Infomercials		
Indianapolis	WEZY-LD	11	Movies	(Note: Licensed to Delphi, Indiana.)	
Indianapolis	WREP-LD	15	Youtoo America	(Note: Licensed to Martinsville, Indiana.)	
Indianapolis	WIIH-CD	17	Confess		
Indianapolis	WDNI-CD	19	Telemundo		
Indianapolis	WSWY-LD	21	Various		
Indianapolis	WSOT-LD	27	NRB TV		
Indianapolis	WUDZ-LD	28	Various		
Indianapolis	WSDI-LD	30	Various		
Indianapolis	WQDE-LD	33	Various		
Indianapolis	WALV-CD	46	MeTV		
Indianapolis	WBXI-CD	47	Start TV		
Indianapolis	WJSJ-CD	51	Dabl	(Note: Licensed to Tipton, Indiana.)	
Lafayette	WPBI-CD	16	Fox, NBC on 16.2		
Lafayette	WPBY-CD	35	ABC, MeTV/MyNetworkTV on 35.2		
South Bend	WEID-LD	18	Daystar		
South Bend	WCWW-LD	25	The CW, ABC on 25.4		
South Bend	WBND-LD	57	ABC		
South Bend	WMYS-LD	69	MyNetworkTV, Telemundo on 69.2		
Terre Haute	W24FB-D	24	Various	(Note: Licensed to Brazil, Indiana.)	
~Chicago, IL	WODN-LD	4	[Blank]	(Note: Licensed to Portage, Indiana.)	
~Chicago, IL	WAAA-LD	49	[Blank]	(Note: Licensed to Valparaiso, Indiana.)	
~Louisville, KY	WJYL-CD	16	Various	(Note: Licensed to Jeffersonville, Indiana.)	
~Louisville, KY	WRLW-CD	17	Various		

== Translators ==
Television station translators in Indiana
Media market	Station	Channel	Translating	Notes	Refs
Fort Wayne	WNHO-LD	29	WLMO-LD		
Fort Wayne	WEIJ-LD	38	WINM		
Indianapolis	WFYI-LD	20	WFYI		
Terre Haute	W19FD-D	19	WBPI-CD		

== Defunct ==
- WCAE St. John (1967–1983)
- WLBC-TV Muncie (1953–1971)
- WRAY-TV Princeton (1953–1954)
- WTAF-TV Marion (1962–1969)
- WURD Indianapolis (1971–1972)
