= WNDY-TV =

Television station in Marion, Indiana

- Marion–Indianapolis, Indiana; United States
- City: Marion, Indiana
- Channels: Digital: 9 (VHF), shared with WISH-TV; Virtual: 23
- Branding: MyIndy-TV 23

Programming
- Affiliations: 23.1: Independent with MyNetworkTV; for others, see § Technical information and subchannels

Ownership
- Owner: Circle City Broadcasting; (CCB License, LLC)
- Sister stations: WRTV, WISH-TV, WIIH-CD

History
- Founded: November 7, 1984
- First air date: October 19, 1987
- Former call signs: WMCC (1987–1995)
- Former channel numbers: Analog: 23 (UHF, 1987–2009); Digital: 32 (UHF, 2002–2018)
- Former affiliations: Independent (1987–1995); The WB (1995–April 1998); UPN (January 1998–2006)
- Call sign meaning: "Indy" (nickname for Indianapolis)

Technical information
- Licensing authority: FCC
- Facility ID: 28462
- ERP: 22.8 kW (main signal); 15 kW (fill-in translator)
- HAAT: 284 m (932 ft) (main signal); 190.2 m (624 ft) (fill-in translator)
- Transmitter coordinates: 39°53′25.0″N 86°12′20.0″W
- Translator(s): 26 (UHF) Indianapolis

Links
- Public license information: Public file; LMS
- Website: www.wishtv.com/myindy-tv

WNDY-TV (channel 23) is a television station licensed to Marion, Indiana, United States, serving the Indianapolis area. It is programmed primarily as an independent station, but maintains a secondary affiliation with MyNetworkTV. WNDY-TV is locally owned by Circle City Broadcasting alongside WRTV (channel 6), WISH-TV (channel 8), and WIIH-CD (channel 17). The four stations share studios on North Meridian Street (at the north end of the Television Row section) on the near north side of Indianapolis; WNDY-TV and WISH-TV also share transmitter facilities on Walnut Drive in the Augusta section of the city's northwest side (near Meridian Hills).

Channel 23 went on the air as WMCC, with full programming beginning October 19, 1987. It was the third independent station for the Indianapolis market and largely subsisted on sports, children's programs, and movies. By the early 1990s, it was available on cable systems throughout central Indiana. Wabash Valley Broadcasting, owned by the Hulman-George family, acquired WMCC in 1994. The station was relaunched as WNDY-TV "Indy TV" on January 9, 1995, with major changes in programming and new studio facilities near the Hulman-owned Indianapolis Motor Speedway. In addition to becoming an affiliate of The WB, it acquired the rights to Indiana High School Athletic Association state championships, The Bob Knight Show, and Hoosier Millionaire. Locally syndicated radio talk show host Mike Pence had a weekly program on the station, while Indianapolis NBC affiliate WTHR produced a nightly 10 p.m. newscast.

After higher-than-expected losses, the Hulman-George family sold WNDY-TV in 1997. After the first buyer dropped out, a bidding war ensued and ended with Paramount Stations Group buying the station to flip it from The WB to UPN, which took place in January 1998. LIN TV, owner of WISH-TV, acquired WNDY-TV in 2005, and the stations have been commonly owned since under several owners. In 2006, the station switched from UPN to MyNetworkTV.

== History ==
=== WMCC: Construction and early years ===
Channel 23 was assigned to Marion in 1970, after the city's first TV station, WTAF-TV (channel 31), sought to move to channel 17. The assignment was deemed to conflict with land mobile uses in Chicago, so channel 23 was assigned instead. WTAF-TV never moved, as its license was canceled at the same time Marion was assigned channel 23. The channel remained dormant for more than a decade until 1983, when two companies applied for the channel. The Mississinewa Communications Corporation was composed of men from Fort Wayne and Huntington, Indiana; Metro Program Network was owned by Jerry Fitzgerald of Cedar Rapids, Iowa. The applications were designated for comparative hearing by the Federal Communications Commission (FCC) that December, but Metro Program Network withdrew its application in May 1984, leaving Mississinewa to be granted the construction permit. The firm struggled to get financial backing for WMCC, which prompted the company to scrap initial plans to have the station on the air by the start of 1985.

In April 1986, Mississinewa agreed to sell WMCC for $52,168 to Gerald J. Robinson, owner of WYZZ-TV in Bloomington, Illinois, and WSMH in Flint, Michigan. The next year, Robinson set out to construct the station. The studios and transmitter were located at Strawtown, 35 miles (56 km) south of Marion and 25 miles (40 km) from Indianapolis. WMCC began broadcasting a test signal on October 5, 1987, with full programming beginning October 19. WMCC entered the market at a fraught time. It was the third independent station to serve Indianapolis, after WTTV (channel 4) and WXIN (channel 59). WXIN's entry had caused program costs to rise, contributing to WTTV filing for bankruptcy protection. In programming, the station focused on children's programs, movies, and sports.

Local program production was minimal. By 1990, the station was airing a weekly public affairs program, Indiana Living. For 13 weeks beginning in July, WMCC aired a locally produced soap opera, It's My Life, starring local teenagers and discussing teen issues.

While it was available on cable systems in Marion, Muncie, and Kokomo, cable providers in the Indianapolis area did not offer it when it launched. This changed in 1993, as new must-carry requirements led to its addition to many local cable lineups. That year, the station reached a verbal agreement to become the Indianapolis-market affiliate of The WB, a new national TV network to debut in January 1995.

=== WNDY: Hulman-George ownership ===
Wabash Valley Broadcasting agreed in May 1994 to acquire WMCC. The company was owned by the Hulman-George family, owners of the Indianapolis Motor Speedway, and owned WTHI-TV in Terre Haute and two TV stations in Florida as well as a television production operation. The president of Wabash, Chris Duffy, had previously been the general manager of WTHR (channel 13) and helped start WPDS—which became WXIN—in 1984. The transaction closed on December 7. The station was made over, including a new call sign. An attempt to pry the WIND call sign from a Chicago station failed, but a donation to Wabash College was successful in securing rights to use WNDY. On January 9, 1995, two days ahead of The WB's debut, WMCC became WNDY-TV "Indy-TV". The station traded heavily on racing imagery in its overhaul. A checkered flag was incorporated into the new logo; Mario Andretti starred in an advertising campaign to raise awareness of the new station; and one print ad depicted a racing helmet with stickers representing the station's syndicated programs. Station operations moved from Strawtown to a new, 30,000-square-foot (2,800 m^{2}) facility owned by the Hulmans near the speedway.

Though the new ownership dropped telecasts of Chicago Cubs and Chicago White Sox baseball, channel 23 had already been telecasting Indianapolis Ice hockey and Butler Bulldogs men's basketball when it was purchased, and management was interested in pursuing further sports rights. In January 1995, Wabash Valley won a ten-year contract with the Indiana High School Athletic Association (IHSAA) to produce and telecast high school state championships in football, basketball, and volleyball. These rights had belonged to WTTV for 18 years. Former WISH-TV sportscaster Vince Welch joined the station as sports director, hosting IHSAA programming and the station's auto racing coverage. The Bob Knight Show moved to WNDY-TV after a 25-year run on WTTV. Despite the strong sports orientation and speedway ownership, WNDY-TV would not telecast the Indianapolis 500, nor would it seek to bid on the 500 Festival Parade. For the 1995 Indianapolis 500, it aired live coverage of ancillary events and, at lunchtime from May 8 to 19, a live feed from the track.

In addition to sports, WNDY-TV offered a number of local programs. In September 1995, the regionally syndicated talk show host Mike Pence debuted a weekly political show airing on Saturday evenings, The Mike Pence Show. Steve Hall of The Indianapolis Star described the program as "fast-paced, entertaining" and more energetic than Pence's radio show. WNDY-TV also won the Hoosier Lottery production contract and, beginning in February 1996, originated statewide telecasts of lottery drawings as well as the weekly Hoosier Millionaire. At the time, Hoosier Millionaire was among the highest-rated lottery TV shows in the nation and the highest-rated local program in the Indianapolis market.

Though Wabash Valley did not plan a news department, it was interested in airing news produced by another station for WNDY-TV. No local station was interested in being paid by WNDY to produce a newscast for channel 23, but in January 1996, WNDY reached a deal with WTHR under which the latter station would lease airtime for a 10 p.m. newscast and provide channel 23 with a cut of the advertising revenues. On March 4, 1996, WTHR began producing the half-hour Channel 13 Eyewitness News on Indy-TV.

The heavy investment into WNDY-TV did not yield the financial results the Hulman-George family had expected. Losses were 50 percent higher than had been predicted, and its lack of group ownership meant that many distributors of syndicated programs did not invite WNDY-TV to bid. In March 1997, the family invited other Indianapolis TV stations to present proposals to operate WNDY-TV under a local marketing agreement (LMA). The family passed on all of the LMA proposals, only to decide to sell the station three months later after receiving multiple unsolicited offers. In August, Spartan Communications was announced as the new owner of WNDY-TV. Indianapolis was to be the largest market for Spartan, whose television group consisted of WSPA-TV in Spartanburg, South Carolina, and stations in smaller markets in the South and Midwest. The company intended for WXIN to manage WNDY under LMA.

=== Paramount Stations Group ownership ===
On October 3, an hour before the WNDY-to-Spartan acquisition was set to close, the company dropped out, possibly because LMA talks broke down. The sudden withdrawal provoked a new round of bidding. ACME Communications, a company partly owned by WB president Jamie Kellner, made an offer—which WNDY-TV's general manager suggested would likely have led to an LMA to WTTV and its owner, Sinclair Broadcast Group. It was beaten out by Paxson Communications Corporation; a sale contract for a $28.42 million offer was drafted. Paxson soon lost out to a last-minute bidder. Paramount Stations Group paid $34.99 million for WNDY-TV and came out the winner. Paramount Stations Group was an owned-and-operated station group for UPN, whose Indianapolis affiliate was WTTV. Relations between UPN and Sinclair had deteriorated in 1997 after Sinclair agreed to flip five UPN affiliates it owned to The WB. While WTTV was not included among them, Sinclair had reportedly informed Paramount that it was going to switch networks in Indianapolis as well, spurring Paramount's interest.

WNDY-TV became the new UPN affiliate in central Indiana on January 16, 1998, after WTTV's affiliation agreement expired. For nearly three months, channel 23 aired UPN and WB programs; this ended April 6, when WTTV became the WB affiliate, even though the original WNDY–WB affiliation agreement ran through January 1999. The move from WNDY to WTTV was perceived as an upgrade for The WB; a director at an Indianapolis media buying firm told Mediaweek, "WTTV is a butt-kicking station."

Some of the high-profile programs and personalities that Wabash Valley had acquired for WNDY-TV left the station. The Bob Knight Show moved back to WTTV ahead of the 1997–98 season. Vince Welch ended his tenure with WNDY in April 1998 and moved over to WIBC radio. WTTV outbid WNDY for the rights to the Indiana Lottery and Hoosier Millionaire beginning in 2000. Ratings for IHSAA basketball championships plummeted after the state went from one championship game for all classes to multiple games in 1998; where audience shares for boys' basketball in 1996 and 1997 exceeded 20 percent, no state title game in 1998 or 1999 exceeded 13 percent. After the 1999 tournaments, WNDY-TV dropped coverage of basketball; the IHSAA sued the station and signed with WHMB-TV for 2000.

John Satterfield served as general manager of WNDY from 2001 to 2003. He identified a station lacking in local identity outside of its WTHR-produced newscasts. Under Satterfield, the station obtained rights to telecast Ball State Cardinals men's basketball and Indiana Firebirds arena football and launched a weekly series about motorcycles, Steel Horse.

=== Ownership with WISH-TV ===
On February 9, 2005, LIN TV announced it would acquire WNDY and WWHO in the Columbus, Ohio, market from Paramount for $85 million. LIN believed it could induce cost savings and efficiencies at the UPN affiliate by integrating it with WISH-TV and its operation that already served as a hub for nine LIN-owned stations. The news prompted one nearly immediate change. On February 14, WTHR's contract to produce the news for WNDY-TV expired, and the 10 p.m. newscast did not air the next night. After two weeks, WNDY began airing a WISH-produced 10 p.m. newscast on February 28. The WTHR newscast moved to that station's associated cable channel, the SkyTrak Weather Network.

The WB and UPN merged in 2006 to form The CW. That network was immediately announced to affiliate with WTTV. In April, LIN reached an agreement to affiliate WNDY-TV and three other stations with MyNetworkTV, a new network set up by Fox Television Stations to serve stations not chosen for The CW. WISH extended its news presence on WNDY-TV twice between 2008 and 2014. In 2008, it debuted a morning newscast extension from 7 to 8 a.m. The WISH-produced 10 p.m. newscast expanded from 30 minutes to an hour in January 2014, with the last 15 minutes serving as a local sports program, Sports Zone Tonight.

LIN TV merged with Media General in 2014. That same year, WISH-TV lost its CBS affiliation to WTTV. After Media General agreed to merge with the Meredith Corporation in 2015, it instead was acquired by Nexstar Broadcasting Group in 2017. Under Media General and Nexstar, WNDY-TV was the local broadcast outlet for a variety of Chicago sports teams in the late 2010s, including the Cubs, White Sox, and Blackhawks.

Nexstar announced its intention to purchase Tribune Media, owner of WXIN and WTTV, in December 2018. To acquire those stations, Nexstar elected to divest itself of WISH and WNDY, agreeing to sell both stations to DuJuan McCoy–owned Circle City Broadcasting for $42.5 million. McCoy agreed to buy the stations after Nexstar CEO Perry Sook personally approached him.

In October 2025, E. W. Scripps Company announced it had agreed to sell ABC affiliate WRTV (channel 6) for $83 million to Circle City Broadcasting. The sale was approved on February 27, 2026, and completed on March 31, giving CCB ownership of three full-power television station licenses in Indianapolis.

== Programming ==
WNDY-TV's principal local programming is sports coverage. Since 2014, WNDY-TV and WISH-TV have been the broadcast home of Indy Eleven soccer, with 20 matches scheduled for air across the two stations in the 2025 season. In 2019, the station partnered with ISC Sports Network to broadcast high school athletic events from the Metropolitan Interscholastic Conference. The station was part of the Cincinnati Reds over-the-air TV network in 2025, airing 10 games. The station began broadcasting IU Indy Jaguars men's basketball games during the 2025–26 season.

== Technical information and subchannels ==
WISH-TV and WNDY-TV share transmitter facilities on Walnut Drive in the Augusta neighborhood of northwest Indianapolis. The high-power VHF signal on channel 9 and a digital replacement translator on UHF channel 26 emanate from this site. The stations' signals are multiplexed:

Subchannels of WISH-TV and WNDY-TV
License	Subchannel	Res.	Short name	Programming
WISH-TV	8.1	1080i	WISH-HD	The CW
WISH-TV	8.2	480i	getTV	Great (4:3)
WISH-TV	8.3	480i	Confess	Confess (WIIH-CD)
WISH-TV	8.4	480i	DIYA	Diya TV
WNDY-TV	23.1	720p	My INDY	Main WNDY-TV programming
WNDY-TV	23.2	480i	RADAR	Radar
WNDY-TV	23.3	480i	WISHNET	Independent

Simulcast of subchannels of another station

On November 1, 2002, WNDY-TV began transmitting a digital signal on UHF channel 32, from its Strawtown transmitter site. It shut down its analog signal on June 12, 2009, the official digital television transition date. The station's digital signal continued to broadcast on its pre-transition UHF channel 32, using virtual channel 23. In 2017, then-owner Nexstar sold the station's spectrum in the FCC's incentive auction for $17.7 million, with the station sharing a channel with WISH-TV.
