= Howard C. Caldwell Jr. =

Television news anchor

- Born: July 18, 1925
- Died: September 11, 2017 (aged 92)
- Education: Butler University
- Occupation: Television news anchor
- Years active: 1952–1994
- Era: 20th century
- Employer: WRTV
- Board member of: Board of Trustees, Butler University
- Spouse: Lyn Gruenholz
- Parents: Howard Caldwell (father); Elsie Caldwell (mother)
- Awards: Indiana Journalism Hall of Fame

Howard C. Caldwell Jr. (July 18, 1925 – September 11, 2017) was an American broadcaster from Indianapolis, Indiana. He was the anchor for WRTV (Channel 6) in Indianapolis for 35 years. He was the first U.S. journalist to interview Indira Gandhi, contributed to two documentaries, authored two books, and received many awards and honors.

== Early life ==
The son of Howard and Elsie Caldwell, Howard Jr. lived with his family in the Irvington neighborhood of Indianapolis. He attended and graduated from Howe High School in 1944. While at Howe, he was the sports editor for the high school newspaper. After graduating, he served in the U.S. Navy as a radio operator during World War II (1944–1946). Upon leaving the Navy, he attended Butler University and majored in journalism. During college he was a member of the social fraternity, Sigma Chi. After completing an undergraduate degree in journalism in 1959, he later graduated from the school with a Masters in Political Science in 1968.

== Career ==
Caldwell's career as a journalist began in Hagerstown, Indiana, for a local newspaper known as The Exponent. However, his career was interrupted by the Korean War. Caldwell served in the Navy's Public Information Office at Great Lakes from 1951 to 1952. After his Korean War service, he re-entered the profession in 1952 as a reporter for WTHI radio/TV in Terre Haute. Seven years later, Caldwell took a position at WFBM television (later known as WRTV) in Indianapolis. Starting in May 1959, he worked as a news anchor for the channel for 35 years. Caldwell's position as anchor began when a colleague suffered a heart attack 20 minutes prior to air time.

Caldwell was the first journalist in the United States to interview Indira Gandhi. The interview with the Indian prime minister aired nationally on NBC in 1965.

Starting in the 1990s, Caldwell began narrating a series entitled "Howard's Indiana".

Caldwell contributed to a documentary on hunger in India and, in 1989, a documentary on community-police relations in Indianapolis entitled, "A Delicate Balance". He also authored two books, both published by IU Press: Tony Hinkle: Coach For All Seasons (1991) and The Golden Age Of Indianapolis Theaters (2010).

Caldwell served as a member of the board of trustees for Butler University (1980–1983), his alma mater.

== Awards and honors ==
In 1978, Caldwell was the first television reporter to receive the “Newsman of the Year" award from the Indianapolis Press Club.

He received honorary doctorates from Butler University (1984) and Indiana University (1992).

In 1989 his documentary on police relations with Indianapolis residents received the Casper Award.

In 1991, Caldwell was elected to Indiana Journalism Hall of Fame. He also received the Gold Circle award from the National Academy of Television Arts and Sciences in 2011.

In 2006, he was honored with the Hilton U. Brown Award for Lifetime Achievement from the Irvington Historical Society. He also received the Indiana Lifetime Achievement Award and was inducted into the Indianapolis Public Schools Hall of Fame in 2008.

== Personal life ==
Caldwell was married to Lynn Gruenholz Caldwell for 62 years. They had three daughters. The Caldwell family lived in a ranch-style house in suburban Indianapolis.
