= Bayou City Broadcasting =

American television broadcast company

Bayou City Broadcasting, LLC
- Company type: Private
- Industry: Broadcast and Digital
- Founded: 2007
- Defunct: 2020
- Fate: Acquired by Entertainment Studios
- Successor: Allen Media Broadcasting
- Headquarters: The Woodlands, Texas, United States
- Key people: DuJuan McCoy (President and CEO)
- Services: Broadcast television
- Owner: DuJuan McCoy
- Website: www.bayoucitybroadcasting.com

Bayou City Broadcasting, LLC was a broadcasting company founded in December 2007 and was owned by DuJuan McCoy. The company was based in The Woodlands, Texas. It is defunct as of September 2020 due to its acquisition by Entertainment Studios.

== History ==
The company's first acquisition of stations occurred in January 2008, when it acquired several television stations in West Texas from Sage Broadcasting for $3 million, including Fox affiliates in Abilene and San Angelo. Bayou City briefly exited broadcasting when it sold those stations to Dallas-based London Broadcasting in September 2012.

The company re-entered the broadcasting business in 2015 when it acquired WEVV-TV in Evansville, Indiana. The station had been owned by Communications Corporation of America (ComCorp), which Nexstar Broadcasting Group was in the midst of purchasing. However, Nexstar was forced to divest the station since it already owned WTVW and WEHT, and Bayou City emerged as the successful buyer.

On March 16, 2016, Bayou City Broadcasting announced it would purchase two more stations from Nexstar, KADN-TV (former flagship station of ComCorp) of Lafayette, Louisiana and its sister station KLAF-LD. Nexstar was acquiring Media General, and planned to retain KLFY-TV—the area's long-time CBS affiliate, instead.

On April 8, 2019, it was announced that DuJuan McCoy would acquire two more Nexstar stations—WISH-TV and WNDY-TV in Indianapolis—for $42.5 million, under the new company Circle City Broadcasting. Nexstar divested the stations (which it acquired via its purchase of Media General) in its subsequent purchase of Tribune Media, electing to retain Tribune's duopoly of CBS station WTTV and Fox station WXIN, rather than retain WISH (which switched to The CW after losing CBS to WTTV). The following month, it was announced that Bayou City Broadcasting's stations would be sold to Entertainment Studios for $165 million.

== Former stations ==
City of license / Market	Station	Channel	Years owned	Current status
Evansville, IN	WEVV-TV	44	2015–2019	CBS affiliate owned by Allen Media Broadcasting
Evansville, IN	WEEV-LD (Note: Repeater of WEVV-DT2.)	47	2015–2019	Fox affiliate owned by Allen Media Broadcasting
Lafayette, LA	KADN-TV	15	2017–2019	Fox affiliate owned by Allen Media Broadcasting
Lafayette, LA	KLAF-LD	46	2017–2019	NBC affiliate owned by Allen Media Broadcasting
Abilene, TX	KXVA	15	2008–2012	Fox affiliate owned by Tegna Inc.
Abilene, TX	KIDZ-CD	42	2008–2012	MyNetworkTV affiliate KIDZ-LD, owned by Tegna Inc.
Albany, TX	KIDV-CD (Note: Satellite of KIDZ-CD.)	34	2008–2012	MyNetworkTV affiliate KIDV-LD, owned by Tegna Inc.
Brownwood, TX	KIDU-CD	17	2008–2012	MyNetworkTV affiliate KIDU-LD, owned by Tegna Inc.
Stamford, TX	KIDT-CD	44	2008–2012	MyNetworkTV affiliate KIDT-LD, owned by Tegna Inc.
Sweetwater, TX	KIDB-LD	35	2008–2012	MyNetworkTV affiliate owned by Tegna Inc.
San Angelo, TX	KIDY	6	2008–2012	Fox affiliate owned by Tegna Inc.
