= Circle City Broadcasting =

Media company in Indiana

- Company type: Private
- Industry: Mass media
- Founded: July 2019; 6 years ago
- Founder: DuJuan McCoy
- Headquarters: Indianapolis, Indiana, United States
- Key people: DuJuan McCoy (President/CEO)
- Products: Broadcast television
- Website: circlecitybroadcasting.com

Circle City Broadcasting is an American media company based in Indianapolis, Indiana.

== History ==
Circle City was founded in July 2019 by DuJuan McCoy (who owned Bayou City Broadcasting until he sold the stations to Allen Media Group) after he purchased WISH-TV and WNDY-TV from Nexstar Media Group for $42.5 million in April. This came after it was announced that Nexstar would acquire Tribune Media in December 2018 (which owns both WXIN and WTTV at the time), and due to FCC ownership rules, Nexstar could not keep both duopolies. The sale was completed on September 19, 2019.

In October 2025, it was announced that the E. W. Scripps Company agreed to sell WRTV to Circle City for $83 million. The sale was approved on February 27, 2026, and completed on March 31. One day later on April 1, WRTV's news department was closed and the station began carrying WISH newscasts.

=== Lawsuit ===
In March 2020, Circle City filed a lawsuit against Dish Network accusing them of racial discrimination as both sides negotiate over fees that WISH was seeking to be re-transmitted on the satellite provider. In August of the same year, Circle City filed a similar lawsuit against AT&T, also citing that the company paid and carried the stations' previous owner, but it refuses to do the same for Circle City. Both companies denied any wrongdoing and claimed they complied business-wise.

In March 2021, the lawsuit proceeded to a federal judge of the U.S. District court. In April 2023, both cases was dismissed as they said there was no "direct evidence of discrimination.” McCoy prepared a legal team to make an appeal. On April 16, the court upheld their dismissal decision and denied the appeal.

On April 25, Circle City filed papers to the 7th U.S. Circuit Court of Appeals to reverse the decision. In May 2024, the request was rejected as the circuit court ruled “For their part, Dish and DirecTV presented clear evidence of a race-neutral reason for their contractual negotiating decisions — Circle City’s lack of bargaining power.”

== Current stations ==
City of license / market	Station	Channel	Owned since	Network affiliation
Indianapolis, Indiana	WISH-TV	8	2019	The CW
Indianapolis, Indiana	WIIH-CD	17	2019	Confess
Indianapolis, Indiana	WNDY-TV	23	2019	MyNetworkTV
Indianapolis, Indiana	WRTV	6	2026	ABC
