= News10 =

News10 or News 10 may refer to:

- KXTV, Sacramento, California
- WTEN, Albany, New York
- WTHI-TV, Terre Haute, Indiana
