= WTAF-TV (Indiana) =

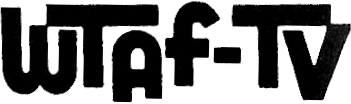

Marion, Indiana; United States
- Channels: Analog: 31 (UHF)

Ownership
- Owner: Geneco Broadcasting, Inc.

History
- First air date: November 3, 1962
- Last air date: March 14, 1969

Technical information
- ERP: 21.9 kW
- HAAT: 250 ft (76 m)
- Transmitter coordinates: 40°33′26″N 85°39′52″W

WTAF-TV was a television station broadcasting on channel 31 in Marion, Indiana, United States, between 1962 and 1969. An independent throughout its history, channel 31 was unable to develop a market between the established stations in Indianapolis and Fort Wayne, which impeded it from obtaining a network affiliation. Even though this crusade took an unexpectedly promising turn for the station, it did so too late to save it from bankruptcy and closure.

== History ==
WTAF-TV went on the air on November 3, 1962. Its studios and transmitter, located in the Elks Club building in downtown Marion, broadcast a schedule of mostly syndicated reruns and films to the area; the station also aired a 10 p.m. nightly newscast, earlier than on most stations in the state. Channel 31 was originally owned by Geneco Broadcasting, Inc., headed by Eugene C. Thompson.

In 1963, Geneco filed to sell a majority stake in WTAF-TV to Northern Indiana Broadcasters, which owned radio stations in Michigan City and Goshen, for $66,740. This was revised to a $40,000 purchase for 60 percent of the station and approved by the Federal Communications Commission in January 1964.

From the outset, channel 31 sought network programming. However, the networks turned the station down, with Marion being adequately covered by their Indianapolis and Fort Wayne affiliates. This did not deter WTAF. After the CBS outlets in Indianapolis (WISH-TV) and Fort Wayne (WANE-TV) refused channel 31's overtures, it was successful at reaching an agreement with WFAM-TV in Lafayette, though this required construction of new microwave links. This failed to materialize by January 1965, when the station was described as a potential customer of the system which would receive programming from WBBM-TV in Chicago. Without a hookup, channel 31 banked on syndicated shows as well as local sports coverage and even Detroit Tigers baseball.

Northern Indiana Broadcasters received permission in 1966 to construct a translator for WTAF-TV in Kokomo. By this time, it partially rebroadcast the programming of WTTV in Bloomington, airing its lineup from 7 to 10 p.m.; sixty percent of its output consisted of live shows. The expansion to Kokomo on translator W29AA also included addition of Kokomo-specific news and sports features to channel 31's programming. The station went as far as to organize a beauty pageant in Kokomo the next year.

In 1968, a 76 percent stake in the station was sold to Anthony R. Martin-Trigona for $157,000. Almost immediately, the station became aggressive at making attempts to improve its position. In September, it petitioned for channel 31 to be changed to 17 at Marion. In January 1969, Martin-Trigona filed a $3 million antitrust lawsuit against CBS, ABC, Corinthian Broadcasting (owner of WISH and WANE), and Avco (which owned the then-ABC affiliate in Indianapolis, WLWI). It charged that the local CBS and ABC affiliates had blocked WTAF-TV from carrying the programs of those networks and claimed that the defendants were engaging in monopolistic practices. WISH pointed out that Martin-Trigona previously claimed the station had "the most limited coverage of any commercial television station in the U.S." and had defined its problems not as a conspiracy but as a question of geography between two established markets. Meanwhile, the FCC approved the assignment of a new channel to Marion, but instead of channel 17, which it worried could cause allocation problems in Chicago, it took channel 23 from Muncie and moved it to Marion.

On March 4, 1969, WTAF-TV announced it had secured what it had sought its entire history: a network affiliation. Martin-Trigona stated that the station would pick up an hour and a half of NBC prime-time programs a night in two weeks' time, which was needed to convert equipment to color. The station also held out hope that it could reach similar agreements with CBS and ABC. By then, however, financial troubles were quickly mounting. On February 26, WTAF-TV had filed for bankruptcy. Geneco's stockholders voted to stop telecasting; at 5 p.m. on March 14, the station went off the air until it could improve its facilities. In informing the FCC of its silence, Geneco noted that it "cannot do justice to our new network affiliation and local program service need with present physical facility" but also that "operating losses impair the ability of the licensee to operate in the public interest".

In July 1969, the WTAF-TV license was assigned to a court-appointed bankruptcy trustee, R. David Boyer. The call letters on the license were changed to WSFD-TV. The designation was never used on air, and the license was deleted on August 24, 1970.

Meanwhile, Martin-Trigona continued his crusade against ABC, in which he owned one share, and tried to start a proxy fight in the company. An attempt to challenge the license renewals of 25 of ABC's affiliates was tossed by the FCC later in the year. He also challenged a merger of Corinthian with Dun & Bradstreet, at which time Broadcasting magazine called him "a persistent gadfly in broadcast matters".
