= WIIH-CD =

Television station in Indianapolis

- Indianapolis, Indiana; United States
- Channels: Digital: 8 (VHF); Virtual: 17

Programming
- Affiliations: 17.1: Confess

Ownership
- Owner: Circle City Broadcasting; (CCB License, LLC)
- Sister stations: WRTV, WISH-TV, WNDY-TV

History
- First air date: January 29, 1988
- Former call signs: W11BV (1988–1995); WIIH-LP (1995–2002); WIIH-CA (2002–2009); WIIH-LD (2009–2011)
- Former channel number: Analog: 11 (VHF, 1988–2002), 17 (UHF, 2002–2009)
- Former affiliations: Independent (1988–2003); Univision (2003–2008); Weather forecast service (2009–2011); CBS via WISH-TV (secondary 1988–2003 and 2009–2011, primary 2011–2014); Get (2014–2025)
- Call sign meaning: Visual disambiguation of former W11BV translator calls with look-alike characters, "H" from WISH-TV calls

Technical information
- Licensing authority: FCC
- Facility ID: 167765
- Class: CD
- ERP: 0.3 kW
- HAAT: 143.2 m (470 ft)
- Transmitter coordinates: 39°53′25″N 86°12′20″W
- Translator(s): WISH-TV 8.3 Indianapolis

Links
- Public license information: Public file; LMS

WIIH-CD (channel 17) is a low-power Class A television station in Indianapolis, Indiana, United States, affiliated with the digital multicast network Confess. It is locally owned by Circle City Broadcasting alongside WRTV (channel 6), WISH-TV (channel 8), and WNDY-TV (channel 23). The four stations share studios on North Meridian Street (at the north end of the Television Row section) on the near north side of Indianapolis; WIIH-CD's transmitter is located on Walnut Drive in the Augusta section of the city's northwest side (near Meridian Hills).

Even though WIIH-CD broadcasts a digital signal of its own, its broadcast radius is limited to the immediate Indianapolis area. It is therefore simulcast on WISH-TV's third digital subchannel (8.3) in order to reach the entire market.

== History ==
=== Early history ===
The station first signed on the air on January 29, 1988, as W11BV, broadcasting on VHF channel 11. Its original owner, White River Corporation, sold the station to Indiana Broadcasting Corporation, the subsidiary of LIN Broadcasting Corporation (predecessor to LIN Media) that held the license for WISH-TV, on December 21, 1992. The station changed its call letters to WIIH-LP in 1995. In 2002, WIIH moved its allocation to UHF channel 17 and received approval from the Federal Communications Commission (FCC) to reclassify its license to Class A status, modifying its calls to WIIH-CA in the process. In 2003, the station became the market's Univision affiliate, branding as "Univision Indiana". Soon afterward, WISH-TV began producing a nightly Spanish-language newscast for WIIH-CA (titled WIIH Noticias), which was cancelled in 2008. On May 18, 2007, LIN TV announced that it was exploring strategic alternatives that could result in the sale of the company.

On September 15, 2008, LIN and Time Warner Cable entered into an impasse during negotiations for new retransmission consent deals for some of the group's television stations. Bright House Networks, a major cable provider for Indianapolis, negotiates carriage contracts through Time Warner Cable. LIN TV requested compensation for carriage in a manner similar to cable networks, as other broadcast station owners began to seek compensation from pay television providers for their programming. The agreement with Bright House expired on October 2. By 12:35 a.m. on October 3, Time Warner Cable and Bright House Networks substituted WIIH, WISH and WNDY as well as LIN's other television stations around the country with other cable channels in markets where the group owns or manages stations and both providers maintain systems. Locally, WISH and WNDY were restored 23 days later on October 26 after LIN reached a groupwide carriage agreement with TWC/Bright House; however, WIIH-CA was excluded from the deal. By 2008, Indianapolis had grown to become the 57th largest media market based on the local Hispanic population in the United States.

On January 1, 2009, the station dropped Univision programming after LIN failed to renew its contract with the network (which expired the day before on December 31, 2008), and adopted a weather-focused programming format, branded as "LWS: Local Weather Station". As a result, two other pay television providers in the Indianapolis market, Comcast and AT&T U-verse secured carriage agreements with Univision to receive its programming from the network's national feed; however, Bright House decided not to pursue a contract with the network at that time. Univision returned to the Indianapolis market when WHMB-TV affiliated with the network in August 2024.

=== As a WISH-TV translator ===
On January 29, 2010, LIN TV filed an application to the FCC to operate a fill-in translator station for WISH-TV using WIIH-LD's UHF channel 17 signal, to serve areas of Indianapolis that experienced problems receiving the WISH-TV signal after the transition. The Commission granted a construction permit to build transmitter facilities for this purpose on June 16, 2010. The transmitter was relocated to the tower site used by WISH-TV on 7619 Walnut Drive (though the City of Indianapolis lists the address as 2500 Westlane Road) in northwestern Indianapolis, and was installed on the tower at 144 metres (472 ft) above average terrain.

The FCC cancelled WIIH-CA's analog license on January 13, 2011, when WIIH-LD was converted into a fill-in translator of WISH-TV (LWS programming remained on digital subchannel 8.2 on WISH-TV and was moved to that same mapped subchannel on both WIIH-CD with the translator conversion). In September 2011, LIN Media filed an application to the FCC to upgrade the WIIH-LD license to Class A status. After the move was approved by the FCC, WIIH's call letters were modified to WIIH-CD.

On March 21, 2014, Media General announced that it would merge with LIN Media in a $1.6 billion deal. The merger was completed on December 19.

== Technical information ==
=== Subchannel ===
Subchannel of WIIH-CD
Subchannel	Res.	Short name	Programming
17.1	480i	WIIH-LD	Confess (4:3)

=== Analog-to-digital conversion ===
WIIH-CA shut down its analog signal on September 9, 2009, and flash cut its digital signal into operation on VHF channel 8 (the former analog and current virtual channel allocation of WISH-TV, which it vacated upon the June 12 digital television transition).
