= WRTV =

Television station in Indianapolis

- Indianapolis, Indiana; United States
- Channels: Digital: 25 (UHF); Virtual: 6
- Branding: WRTV 6

Programming
- Affiliations: 6.1: ABC; for others, see § Subchannels

Ownership
- Owner: Circle City Broadcasting; (CCB License, LLC)
- Sister stations: WISH-TV, WNDY-TV, WIIH-CD

History
- First air date: May 30, 1949
- Former call signs: WFBM-TV (1949–1972)
- Former channel numbers: Analog: 6 (VHF, 1949–2009); Radio: 87.7 (FM, 1949–2009)
- Former affiliations: CBS (1949–1956); ABC (secondary, 1949–1954); Paramount (secondary, 1949–1955); DuMont (secondary, 1949–1955); NBC (1956–1979); NTA (secondary, 1956–1961)
- Call sign meaning: "We are TV"

Technical information
- Licensing authority: FCC
- Facility ID: 40877
- ERP: 1,000 kW
- HAAT: 294 m (965 ft)
- Transmitter coordinates: 39°53′56.6″N 86°12′3.7″W

Links
- Public license information: Public file; LMS
- Website: www.wrtv.com

WRTV (channel 6) is a television station in Indianapolis, Indiana, United States, affiliated with ABC. It is locally owned by Circle City Broadcasting alongside WISH-TV (channel 8), WNDY-TV (channel 23), and WIIH-CD (channel 17). The four stations share studios on North Meridian Street (at the north end of the Television Row section) on the near north side of Indianapolis; WRTV's transmitter is located on the city's northwest side near Meridian Hills, Indiana.

== History ==
=== WFBM-TV ===
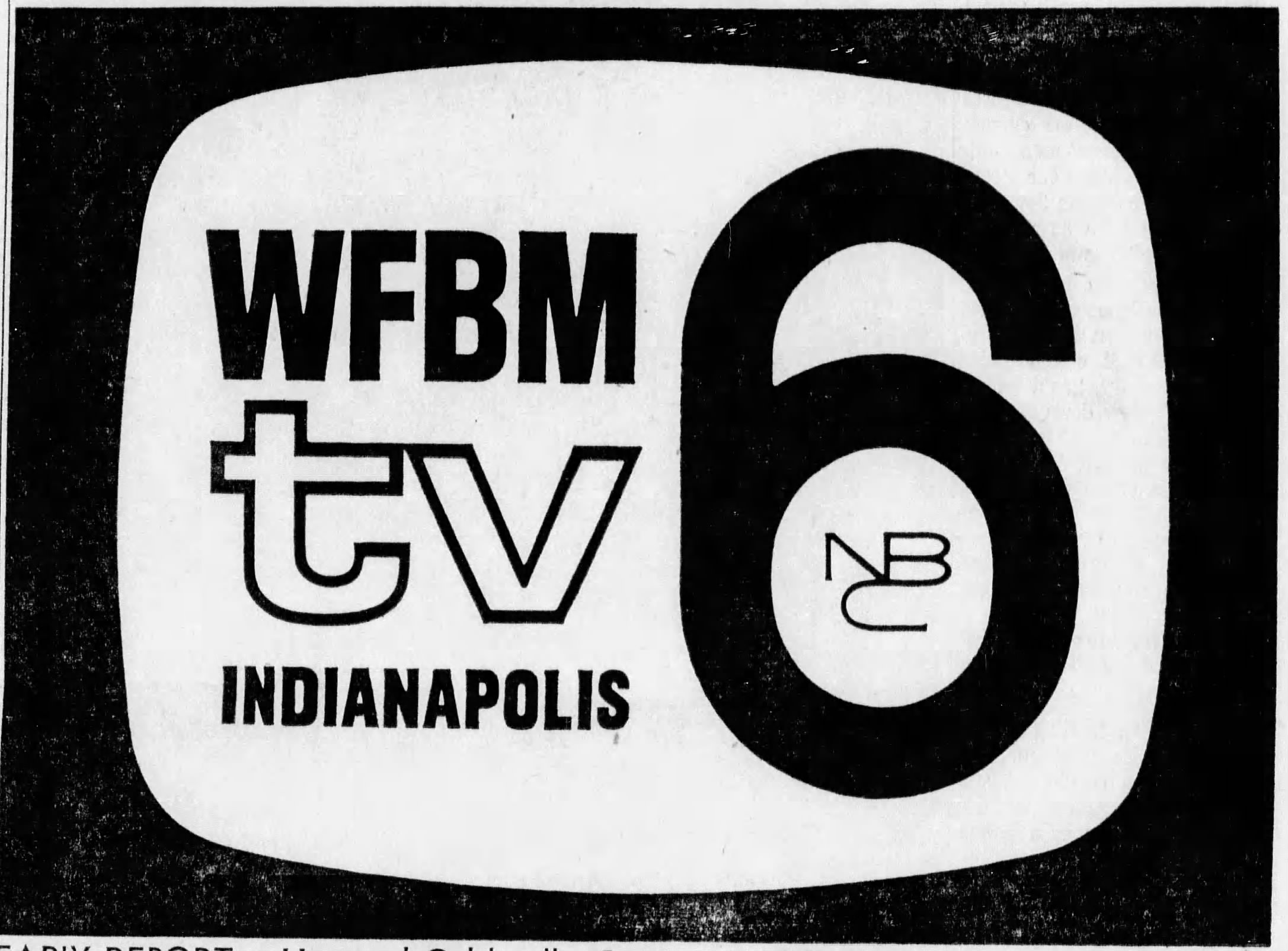
Logo used from 1966 to 1972 by WFBM-TV.

The station first signed on the air on May 30, 1949, as WFBM-TV. Founded by the Consolidated Television and Radio Broadcasters subsidiary of the Bitner Group, owner of radio station WFBM (1260 AM, now WNDE), it is the oldest television station in the state of Indiana. The first program broadcast on the station was a documentary titled Crucible of Speed, about the early history of the Indianapolis 500 auto race; this was followed by the inaugural live television broadcast of the event. The station originally operated as a CBS affiliate, although it maintained secondary affiliations with ABC and the DuMont Television Network.

WFBM-TV began to split ABC programming with Bloomington-based primary NBC affiliate WTTV (channel 10, which moved to channel 4 in February 1954) when that station signed on in November 1949; both stations lost their affiliations with ABC to WISH-TV (channel 8) when that station signed on in July 1954. WFBM-TV also aired programs from the short-lived Paramount Television Network, among them Time For Beany, Dixie Showboat, Hollywood Reel, Cowboy G-Men, and Hollywood Wrestling. Channel 6 acquired an FM sister in 1955 with the sign-on of WFBM-FM (94.7 FM, now WFBQ). In 1956, WFBM-TV became the market's NBC affiliate, taking the affiliation from WTTV. During the late 1950s, the station was also briefly affiliated with the NTA Film Network.

Bitner sold its broadcasting interests to magazine publisher Time Inc. in 1957, who four years later subordinated their acquisition under its in 1961 established subsidiary Time-Life, Inc. as Time–Life Broadcasting, Inc. In the mid-1960s, WFBM-TV became the first television station in Indiana to begin broadcasting its programming in color.

=== WRTV ===
In late October 1970, WFBM-AM-FM-TV were sold to McGraw-Hill in a group deal that also involved Time-Life's other radio and television combinations in Denver, San Diego and Grand Rapids, Michigan; and KERO-TV in Bakersfield, California. To comply with the Federal Communications Commission's new restrictions on concentration of media ownership that went into effect shortly afterward, McGraw-Hill was required to sell the radio stations in Indianapolis, Denver, San Diego and Grand Rapids to other companies. Time-Life would later take WOOD-TV in Grand Rapids out of the final deal and retain ownership of that station. By the time the sale was finalized in June 1972, the purchase price for the entire group was just over $57 million. KERO-TV, KLZ-TV (now KMGH-TV) in Denver and KOGO-TV (now KGTV) in San Diego were retained by McGraw-Hill along with WFBM-TV. The radio stations retained the WFBM designation; McGraw-Hill asked for a set of call letters containing the letters "TV" and received the call letters WRTV on June 1.

By the late 1970s, NBC's national ratings crashed to third place, becoming the lowest-rated of the three major U.S. broadcast networks, while ABC rose to the ranks of first place around that same time; as a result, ABC sought stronger stations to serve as its affiliates in several markets. The two networks swapped affiliations in Indianapolis on June 1, 1979, with WRTV becoming the market's new ABC affiliate, and WTHR (channel 13) becoming an NBC affiliate. As a result, WRTV became the third television station in the Indianapolis market to affiliate with ABC. In the process, it became the first television station in the Indianapolis market (WTTV would become the second Indianapolis station 35 years later when that station became a CBS affiliate), and one of the few television stations in the United States to have served as a primary affiliate of all three heritage broadcast networks. ABC announced its move from WTHR to WRTV in late 1978; the delay in the switch was largely a result of NBC having to choose between signing with WTHR or the then-independent WTTV. The final NBC program to air on WRTV was an episode of The Tomorrow Show that aired at the midnight hour of June 1, 1979. The first ABC program to air on WRTV was Good Morning America the following morning.

In October 1994, ABC and McGraw-Hill signed a long-term deal in which all of the group's stations would be affiliated with the network; in addition to renewing WRTV's existing affiliation, this deal saw sister outlets KMGH-TV in Denver and KERO-TV in Bakersfield affiliate with ABC.

On January 31, 1995, WBAK-TV in Terre Haute (which changed its call letters to WFXW in 2005) ended its 22-year affiliation with ABC to become that market's original Fox affiliate, citing the low viewership it had suffered due to the then-overabundance of higher-rated ABC stations in adjacent markets (including WRTV) that were receivable in the area. This left viewers with only fringe access from WRTV (which can be received in Terre Haute via an outdoor antenna and became the default ABC affiliate on cable providers on the Indiana side of the market), and other out-of-market ABC stations from Evansville, Indiana, and Champaign, Illinois (both of which were carried on cable on the Illinois side of the market), as Terre Haute did not have enough stations to support full-time affiliations from four networks (only three commercial full-power stations—WTWO, WTHI-TV and WBAK—are licensed to the market, and ABC opted not to relegate itself to a secondary affiliation). On September 1, 2011, WFXW (which changed its callsign to WAWV-TV) voluntarily disaffiliated from Fox and rejoined ABC as part of a long-term affiliation renewal between ABC and the Nexstar Broadcasting Group (which manages the station through owner Mission Broadcasting) involving the company's existing ABC stations in nine other markets; WRTV was dropped from most Terre Haute area cable providers by May 28, 2012.

WRTV became the first television station in the Indianapolis market to launch its own website (theindychannel.com) in the late 1990s; it later became the first to offer a mobile website (6News OnTheGo) the following decade. In 1998, the station changed its on-air branding to "RTV6"; however, its newscasts were instead branded as 6 News until 2001 and again from 2006 to 2012.

==== Sale to Scripps ====
On October 3, 2011, The McGraw-Hill Companies announced that it would sell its seven-station broadcasting division, including WRTV, to the E. W. Scripps Company for $212 million. The sale received FCC approval on November 29, 2011, and was formally consummated on December 30. The deal made WRTV a sister station to Scripps flagship and adjacent-market ABC affiliate WCPO-TV in Cincinnati. In June 2012, WRTV opened a secondary facility at the studios of news/talk radio station WIBC (93.1 FM) in downtown Indianapolis; most of the station's newscasts are produced out of the Monument Circle studio, which underwent renovations to house production facilities. This resulted from a multi-year agreement with WIBC's owner Emmis Communications that was signed that April, in which WRTV also provides news content for WIBC with some staff appearing on both stations.

In May 2014, Scripps announced that WRTV's North Meridian Street studios would begin handling the master control operations of the company's 19 television stations as early as July of that year, expanding upon an existing regional centralcasting hub built under McGraw-Hill ownership. The expanded operations created 10 new jobs. Scripps renewed ABC affiliations for WRTV and nine other stations through 2019 on December 10, 2014.

On August 13, 2020, as part of the transition to Scripps' then-new group-wide graphics package, WRTV dropped the long-time "RTV6" moniker and began to brand as simply "WRTV", with its newscasts accordingly rebranded from RTV6 News to WRTV News.

==== Sale to Circle City Broadcasting ====
In October 2025, Scripps announced it had agreed to sell WRTV for $83 million to Circle City Broadcasting, owner of WISH-TV and WNDY-TV. The sale was approved on February 27, 2026, and completed on March 31, giving CCB ownership of three full-power television station licenses in Indianapolis. The FCC granted a waiver to its duopoly rules for the purchase, arguing that the sale would "advance the public interest". The new ownership moved to immediately merge WRTV into WISH, and began the process of laying off the majority of its employees that evening (with some of the employees receiving severance packages), all while they produced the station's final in-house newscasts. The extent of the layoffs were unclear, with meteorologist Todd Klaassen reporting that "essentially the entire staff" of the station had been laid off. The following day, WRTV's newscasts were replaced with WISH-produced programs.

In combination with Tegna's sale to Nexstar Media Group the previous month, it further consolidated the "big four" network affiliates in the Indianapolis market under two different owners (with Nexstar controlling WTHR, WTTV, and Fox affiliate WXIN [channel 59], although Nexstar committed to divesting WTHR within two years of the sale's completion) and reduced the number of distinct news voices in the market.

The sale also separated WRTV from KERO, KGTV, and KMGH, its longtime sister stations dating back to their ownership under Time-Life.

== Programming ==
WRTV clears the entirety of ABC's network schedule and typically airs all network programs in pattern, except during instances where the station carries breaking news or severe weather coverage, or special programming. During the 1987-88 season, WRTV preempted ABC's 9:30 p.m. time slot on Fridays, following the move of Max Headroom to Thursdays, in favor of the short-lived Suzanne Somers vehicle She's the Sheriff. In 2004, WRTV, along with the other McGraw-Hill stations, claimed that they tried to preempt Saving Private Ryan, but out of desperation, aired the film.

=== Sports programming ===
For most of the time since ABC began airing live, flag-to-flag coverage of the Indianapolis 500 in 1986, WRTV aired the race in prime time on a tape delay rather than airing it live. The Indianapolis Motor Speedway insisted on this arrangement to encourage residents and tourists in the Indianapolis metropolitan area to attend the race. During the time slot in which the race aired live, that day's ABC prime time schedule aired early under special dispensation from the network. In 1999, WRTV televised the Indianapolis 500 live, in addition to the tape-delayed prime time broadcast, as part of WRTV's 50th anniversary. On May 25, 2016, with the 100th anniversary event sold out, IMS and WRTV announced that channel 6 would air the Indianapolis 500 live in the market for the first time since 1999. WRTV lost its role as the local broadcaster of the Indianapolis 500 after the 2018 race, when ABC lost the rights to air the race after 54 years (WRTV had aired each race since 1980, a year after it became an ABC station); beginning in 2019, with the broadcast rights to the race going to NBC, WTHR (which previously aired the race between 1958 and 1979) served as the local broadcaster. Since 2025, WXIN is the broadcaster of the race. The blackout policy, however, has continued.

The station carries select Indianapolis Colts NFL games broadcast by ABC as part of the network's Monday Night Football package from the 1984 season until the 2005 season, and since 2020 through ABC's simulcasts. The station acquired the local rights to two Colts regular season games during the 2014 season between the Philadelphia Eagles (on September 15) and between the New York Giants (on November 3), both of which aired on ESPN's Monday Night Football—whose Colts broadcasts are normally carried over-the-air by WNDY-TV (channel 23). In both situations, the station rescheduled ABC's Monday lineup: Dancing with the Stars aired the following Tuesday afternoon before the station's 5 p.m. newscast on the night of its original broadcast, but did not open a separate voting window for the Indianapolis market, while it aired Castle after ABC's late night programming. In addition, all Indiana Pacers games aired through ABC's NBA coverage are broadcast on WRTV, including the team's appearance in the 2025 NBA Finals.

=== News operation ===
For most of its first four decades on the air, WFBM/WRTV was Indianapolis' dominant news station. As late as the early 1980s, WRTV's news viewership often exceeded the combined audience of WISH and WTHR. WISH surged into first place in the mid-1980s, although WRTV managed to remain at a solid second place even after the retirement of longtime anchor Howard Caldwell in 1994. However, channel 6's ratings flatlined after a botched format revamp in 1996, coinciding with WTHR's surge to first place. It fell to last place for the first time in its history, and for most of the time from then until 2013, it finished third behind WTHR and WISH-TV. On some occasions, it fell to fourth behind WXIN. Since 2014, the station has been part of a spirited four-way battle for second place along with WISH, WXIN, and WTTV.

As Indiana's oldest television station, WRTV has brought forth several technological innovations over the years. It was the first television station in Indiana to record local programming on videotape and to use mini-cams for newsgathering purposes. Channel 6 was also the first in the state to use microwave relays (years prior to the use of satellite transmissions for newsgathering) to provide live remote footage from the field ("Insta-Cam"), the first to use a mobile satellite uplink vehicle (NewStar 6) to provide live video from remote locations, the first to convert to non-linear digital editing for news content, the first to use digital news cameras and the first to provide VODcasting. In 1988, the station debuted a half-hour 5 p.m. newscast, becoming the first station in the market to carry an early evening news program in that timeslot. In the mid-1990s, the station launched a 24-hour cable news channel NewsChannel 64, which later evolved into "6 News 24/7" and began to be carried on digital subchannel 6.2 by the late 2000s.

On September 10, 2007, WRTV expanded its 5 p.m. newscast to one hour (replacing syndicated programming in the 5:30 p.m. timeslot) and debuted a half-hour early evening newscast at 7 p.m., the first such newscast in the Indianapolis market in that timeslot. Station vice president and general manager Don Lundy stated that it launched the latter program to reach viewers whose longer workdays and commutes prevented them from arriving home in time to watch a 5 or 6 p.m. newscast. The station's weekend morning newscasts were cancelled around this time, as a cost-saving measure imposed by McGraw-Hill.

On October 12, 2008, WRTV became the third television station in the state of Indiana to begin broadcasting its local newscasts in high definition. In September 2012, WRTV began broadcasting its newscasts from its Monument Circle studio facility that month.

On September 7, 2013, WRTV debuted weekend morning newscasts (a one-hour block running from 6 to 7 am, and an additional two-hour block at 8 a.m. on Saturdays and for a half-hour on Sundays), restoring morning newscasts to its weekend schedule. The expansion resulted in the hires of eight on-air and behind-the-scenes employees to the station. As a result, WRTV moved the weekend edition of Good Morning America to 7 a.m. (the network's recommended timeslot for the program in all time zones) on both days.

On April 1, 2026, as a result of the acquisition of WRTV by Circle City Broadcasting, WRTV's news department was closed, and the station began to carry WISH-produced newscasts. CCB stated that WRTV planned to produce 30 hours of local news and entertainment programs that are "distinct" from WISH.

==== Notable former on-air staff ====
- Howard Caldwell – anchorman (1959–1994)
- Tom Carnegie – longtime sports director (1953–1985)
- Frances Farmer – host of afternoon movie showcase Frances Farmer Presents
- Hal Fryar (a.k.a. "Harlow Hickenlooper") – host of the Three Stooges show, also one of nine such local hosts from across the country cast as villains in the Stooges' full-length feature The Outlaws Is Coming
- Emily Gimmel – morning reporter
- Durward Kirby (sidekick of Garry Moore and Allen Funt)
- Clyde Lee – main anchor (1976–2001)
- Marilyn Mitzel – anchor/reporter (1977–1984)
- Dave Piontek – sports anchor
- Phil Ponce – reporter
- Diane Willis – 6 and 11 p.m. anchor (1987–2001)

== Technical information ==
=== Subchannels ===
The station's signal is multiplexed:

Subchannels of WRTV
Subchannel	Res.	Short name	Programming
6.1	720p	WRTV-HD	ABC
6.2	480i	Grit	Grit
6.3	480i	Laff	Laff
6.4	480i	QVC	QVC
6.5	480i	HSN	HSN
6.6	480i	HSN2	HSN2
29.2	480i	WTTV4.2	Independent (WTTK)
29.3	480i	COZI	Cozi TV (WTTK)

Broadcast on behalf of another station

On March 17, 2010, WRTV announced a partnership with Hometown Sports Indiana (HTSI) to air live high school and collegiate sporting events on digital subchannel 6.2. The subchannel was branded by WRTV as "Hometown Sports and News" (HTSN) and the HTSI/HTSN content replaced a 24-hour news and weather channel ("6 News 24/7"), which aired rolling news and weather updates and simulcasts of WRTV newscasts. HTSI/HTSN carried local high school and collegiate football, basketball, and baseball game telecasts, as well as Indy Fuel hockey and Indianapolis Indians baseball. Some HTSI/HTSN content was simulcast on WRTV's primary channel, including a half-hour report in the early morning hours on Saturdays and Sundays. Citing the rising monetary cost of sports content, WRTV dropped HTSI/HTSN content from subchannel 6.2 on October 1, 2016, in favor of an affiliation with the digital network Grit.

On October 3, 2011, WRTV began carrying the health and lifestyle-oriented service Live Well Network (which is owned by ABC corporate parent The Walt Disney Company) on digital subchannel 6.3. Comcast began carrying the subchannel on digital channel 246 later that month. The network was carried until its national discontinuation on April 15, 2015, when the sitcom/comedy film network Laff replaced it as part of a bulk affiliation deal with Scripps' former LWN stations.

=== Analog-to-digital conversion ===
WRTV shut down its analog signal, over VHF channel 6, at 8 a.m. on June 12, 2009, the official date on which full-power television stations in the United States transitioned from analog to digital broadcasts under federal mandate. The station's digital signal continued to broadcast on its pre-transition UHF channel 25, using virtual channel 6.
