= WHMB-TV =

Television station in Indianapolis

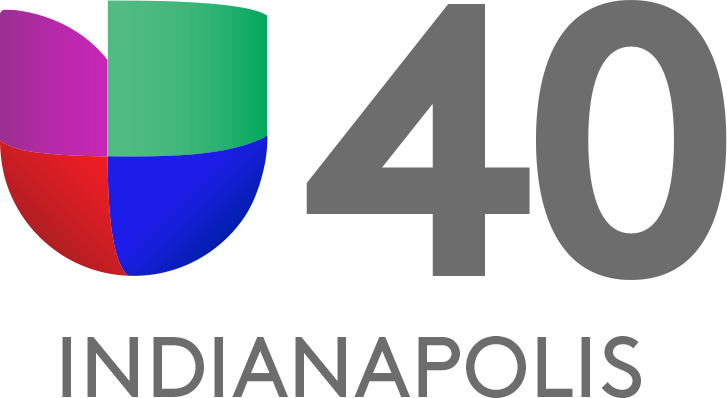
- Indianapolis, Indiana; United States
- Channels: Digital: 7 (VHF); Virtual: 40
- Branding: Univision 40 Indianapolis; Noticias N+ Univision Indianapolis (newscasts)

Programming
- Affiliations: 40.1: Univision; for others, see § Subchannels

Ownership
- Owner: Family Broadcasting Corporation; (Family Entertainment Television, Inc.)

History
- First air date: February 22, 1971
- Former call signs: WURD (1971–1972)
- Former channel numbers: Analog: 40 (UHF, 1971–2009); Digital: 16 (UHF, 200?–2012), 20 (UHF, 2012–2019)
- Former affiliations: Religious independent (1971–1972, 2018–2024); LeSEA (1972–2018)
- Call sign meaning: World Harvest Missionary Broadcasting

Technical information
- Licensing authority: FCC
- Facility ID: 37102
- ERP: 29 kW
- HAAT: 301.8 m (990 ft)
- Transmitter coordinates: 39°53′39.2″N 86°12′20.5″W

Links
- Public license information: Public file; LMS
- Website: whmbtv40.com

WHMB-TV (channel 40) is a television station in Indianapolis, Indiana, United States, affiliated with the Spanish-language network Univision. It is owned by the Family Broadcasting Corporation (formerly known as LeSEA Broadcasting and later World Harvest Broadcasting). WHMB's studios are located on Greenfield Avenue in Noblesville, and its transmitter is located on Walnut Drive in northwestern Indianapolis.

== History ==
=== WURD ===
White River Radio Corporation, owned by Rev. Wendell Hansen of Noblesville, filed an application on August 19, 1966, to build a new station in Lawrence, Indiana, on the channel 40 allocation for Indianapolis. The Federal Communications Commission (FCC) approved the application on November 22, 1966. At that time, White River also had a pending application for a new radio station at 1110 kHz.

It was years before anyone saw a picture on channel 40. The nominal city of license was changed to Indianapolis in 1968, the same year ground was broken on facilities. In January 1969, the project was said to be "stalled by construction delays"; later that year, the Christian Broadcasting Network (CBN) filed to purchase the unbuilt station, which would have been its second television property. CBN bowed out of the deal at the start of 1970, and the project continued on an on-again, off-again basis, though transmitter equipment was delivered in May 1970.

The transmitter was finally activated on December 15, 1970, with programs starting two months later, on February 22. White River's radio station had also been approved after years of planning and signed on the air at the same time as WHYT. The station aired some syndicated children's shows, including Romper Room and Bozo the Clown. There was also country music programming, some public affairs, and religious programming, as well as one of the first shows for the Black community in Indianapolis.

White River was heavily undercapitalized for starting a television station, and few viewers were finding their way to tune to the UHF band, even with the recent launch of WFYI on channel 20. Within months, programming was cut back to save on electricity. In its largest programming coup, the station managed to secure the rights to rebroadcast Chicago White Sox games midway through the 1971 season.

After little more than a year with a poor advertising market, White River got out of television. Assembly of God minister Lester Sumrall filed to buy WURD from Hansen in May 1972. By that time, channel 40 had curtailed telecasting to two days a week. Broadcast operations were suspended on June 25 ahead of the sale; creditors were already suing in court to try and force the station into bankruptcy.

=== WHMB ===
The FCC approved the sale to Sumrall's LeSea Broadcasting on August 15, 1972. The station resumed broadcasting on November 3 with a new call sign, WHMB-TV, and a schedule of mostly religious programs. It was LeSea's first television property; at the time, it only owned a radio station, WHME in South Bend. In 1974, the station expanded its broadcasting hours, signing on in the late morning; it also acquired the local rights to The 700 Club, which WHMB ran twice each weekday (it eventually ran a 90-minute edition of the program live at 10 a.m., along twice daily repeats of the hour-long version of the program by the latter part of the decade). By that point, the station also began carrying additional secular programming, with a mix of children's programs and westerns airing from about 3 to 6 p.m. The station began broadcasting 18 hours a day in 1975; at that time, WHMB began airing The PTL Club, which it aired in its two-hour broadcast (which was reduced to one hour in 1982) as well as one-hour versions that aired twice a day; the station also aired religious programs from televangelists such as Jimmy Swaggart and Richard Roberts.

In addition, the station also aired a few locally produced shows; Von Saum hosted a weekday afternoon children's program from 1972 until shortly before his death from heart failure in 1993 titled Pirate Adventures with Captain Hook, in which Saum (whose left leg and arm were amputated after he was hit by a car while riding his motorcycle at age 17 in 1960) and other cast members playing Hook's pirates used music and object lessons to teach children about Jesus Christ. Saum, who originated the Captain Hook character after a preacher encouraged him to a develop the character for Saum's children's ministry tours by acquiring a hook for his prosthetic arm and costume, was approached by Sumrall to bring his character to television. WHMB, which later syndicated the series to several countries, dropped the program when it returned recordings of the episodes to the now-deceased Saum years later. Channel 40 also ran twice-a-day airings of a locally produced weekday bible study program hosted by Lester Sumrall, as well as a Christian-oriented music and variety program hosted by the Sumrall family that aired three times a day.

Former WHMB logo, used from 2008 until June 2018.

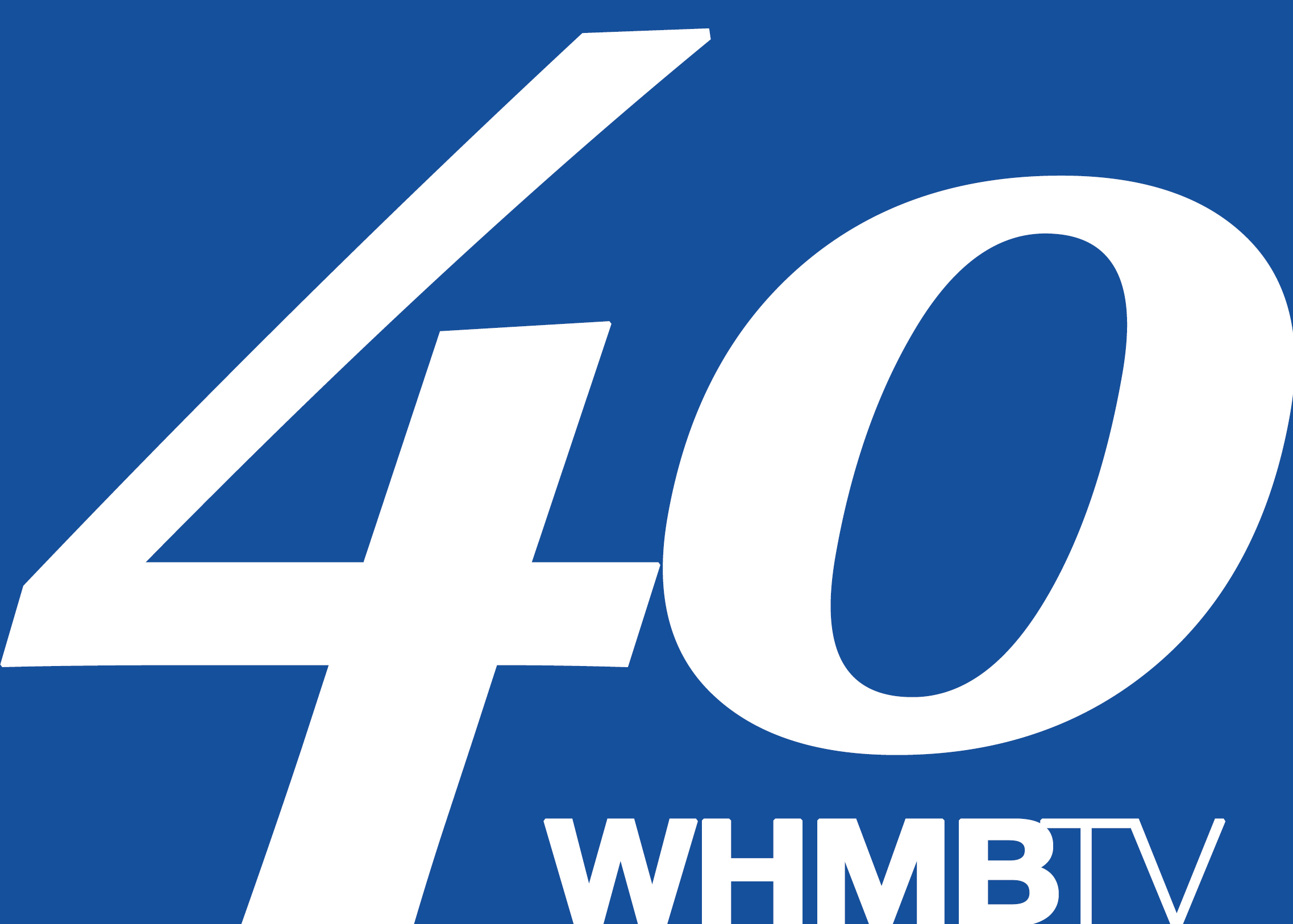
Former WHMB logo, used from June 2008 until August 2024.

The station began broadcasting on a 24-hour schedule by 1981; around this time, WHMB ran Christian programs from 9 a.m. to 2 p.m. and 7 p.m. to 7 a.m.; cartoons from 7 to 9 a.m. and 3 to 5 p.m.; classic sitcoms from 1 to 3 p.m.; and a mix of sitcoms and occasional westerns from about 5 to 7 p.m. On Saturdays, the station ran children's and family-oriented secular programming, most of which was drawn from their weekday schedule from 7 a.m. to 6 p.m., and religious programming during the nighttime hours, and a schedule consisting entirely of Christian-oriented religious programs on Sundays.

Gradually, by 1983, WHMB carried Christian programming for much of the broadcast day, with breakaway windows for secular programming (including sitcoms, westerns and public domain movies) each weekday from 3 to 6 p.m. and Saturdays from 11 a.m. to 6 p.m. By the 1990s, the station began acquiring somewhat more recent sitcoms from the 1970s and 1980s. WHMB eventually reduced its secular programming (consisting of sitcoms, drama series and lifestyle programs) to 2 to 7 p.m. each weekday and a scattered amount for a few hours a day on Saturdays, along with carrying children's programs complying with the FCC's educational programming guidelines for two hours on Saturday mornings and an hour on Sunday afternoons.

In August 2024, WHMB and South Bend sister station WHME-TV switched their primary channels to Univision. The network was previously affiliated in the market with WIIH-CA from 2003 until 2008, and viewers then received the network's programming through its national cable and satellite feed for the next fourteen years.

== Programming ==
During the mid-1990s, WHMB aired a rebroadcast of then CBS affiliate WISH-TV (channel 8)'s 6 p.m. newscast on a one-hour delay at 7 p.m.

=== Sports programming ===
In 1997, the Indiana High School Athletic Association (IHSAA) awarded WHMB the local television rights to the statewide boys' and girls' high school basketball tournament finals and high school football championship games after UPN affiliate WTTV (channel 4) chose not to renew its contract to carry the games citing ratings declines; that year, the IHSAA converted its basketball tournament from a single-class to a multi-class format. WHMB opted against renewing the contract in 2004; the station continues to air high school football and basketball games on Friday nights during the IHSAA athletic season. The station also maintains rights to broadcast a handful of minor league baseball games annually from the Indianapolis Indians; during instances in which the station carries an away game featuring the team, WHMB instead transmits the home team's broadcast feed.

From 2012 to 2019, WHMB-TV was the Indianapolis home to the syndicated package of Atlantic Coast Conference football and men's basketball games originating from the ACC Network, an ad hoc syndicated sports network operated by Raycom Sports. The package included some men's basketball games involving the University of Notre Dame Fighting Irish as that school's sports programs (except football) joined the ACC in July 2013.

== Technical information ==
=== Subchannels ===
The station's signal is multiplexed:

Subchannels of WHMB
Subchannel	Res.	Short name	Programming
40.1	720p	WHMB-HD	Univision
40.2	720p	CHSN	CHSN
40.3	480i	QVC	QVC
40.4	480i	HSN	HSN
40.5	480i	QVC2	QVC2
40.6	480i	CHSN+	CHSN+

WHMB-TV was the only LeSEA-owned station that was not included in a groupwide affiliation agreement with Cozi TV that was announced on June 17, 2014; the network, which primarily airs classic television series, had been carried locally on the second digital subchannel of NBC affiliate WTHR (channel 13) since March 2013 due to an existing agreement with then-owner Dispatch Broadcast Group and its Class A sister station WALV-CD (channel 46), a MeTV affiliate since 2016, which is carried on WTHR's third digital subchannel as well.

In January 2017, LeSEA announced All Sports Channel 40.3, a subchannel with programming from the American Sports Network. It aired college basketball and ice hockey from the Big Ten Conference, Mid-American Conference, Horizon League and Hockey East. The subchannel also featured a sports talk show. The affiliation only lasted a short time, with a "WHMB-40.3" logo screen broadcasting from April until the end of May 2017.

At the end of May 2017, LeSEA shuffled World Harvest Television to its 40.3 subchannel, and added Light TV to 40.2. In September 2018, 40.3 was realigned to broadcast HSN, and WHT was dropped. In May 2020, Light TV was dropped, and QVC was added to 40.2.

On October 17, 2024, WHMB announced that Chicago Sports Network, the local television home for the Chicago Bulls, Blackhawks and White Sox, would begin broadcasting on the station's second and sixth subchannels. The station was disallowed from carrying Bulls games to protect the local rights for the Indiana Pacers.

=== Analog-to-digital conversion ===
WHMB-TV shut down its analog signal, over UHF channel 40, on January 16, 2009. The station's digital signal continued to broadcast on its pre-transition UHF channel 16, using virtual channel 40. In May 2012, the FCC issued a Report & Order, approving a request by LeSEA to move the station's digital signal from channel 16 to UHF channel 20.

== See also ==
- Family Broadcasting Corporation
- FETV
- WHME-TV
- KWHE
