= WISH-TV =

Television station in Indianapolis

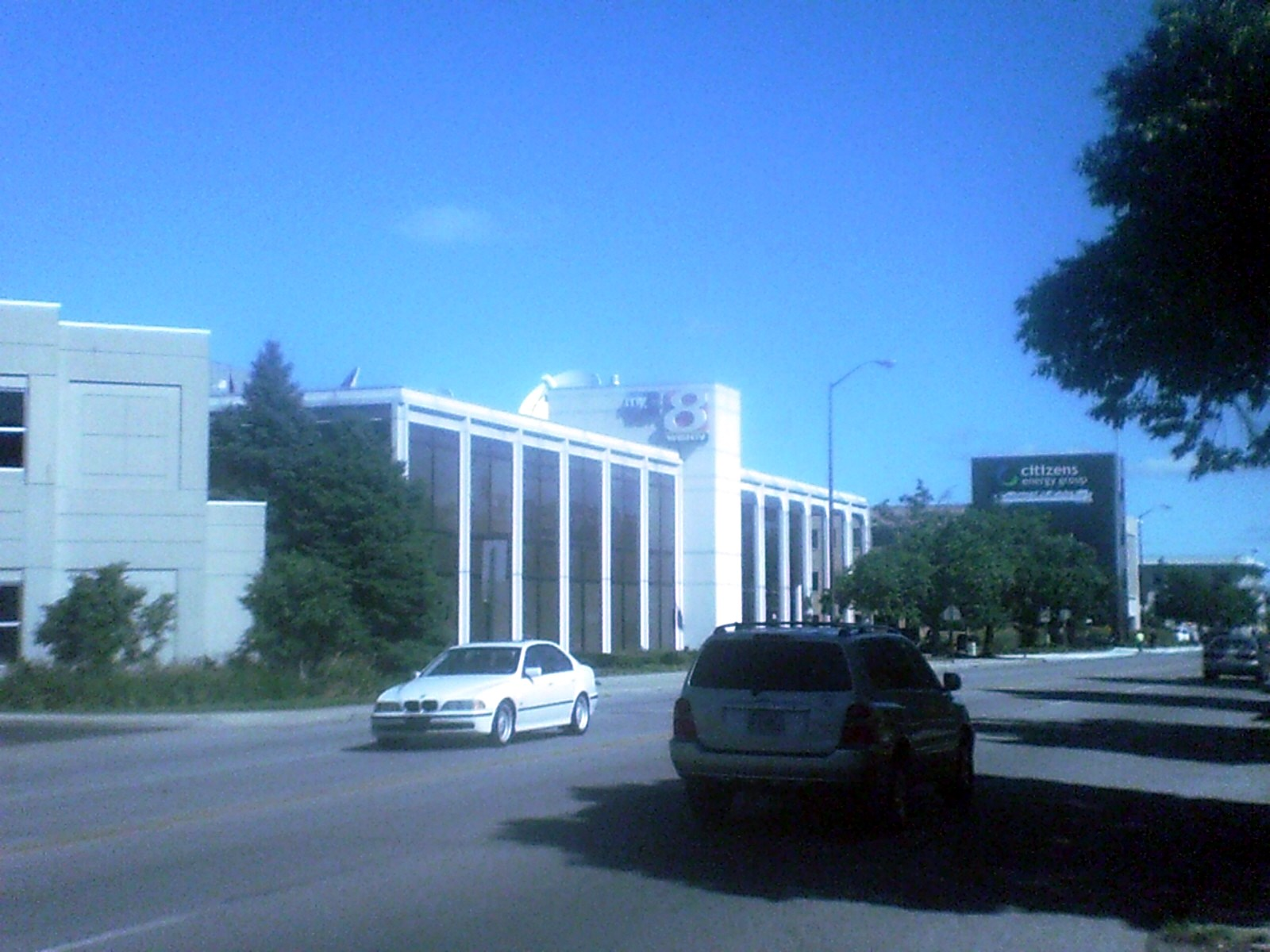
- WISH-TV's studio facility on Meridian Street.
- Indianapolis, Indiana; United States
- Channels: Digital: 9 (VHF), shared with WNDY-TV; Virtual: 8
- Branding: WISH-TV 8; News 8

Programming
- Affiliations: 8.1: The CW; for others, see § Technical information and subchannels

Ownership
- Owner: Circle City Broadcasting; (CCB License, LLC)
- Sister stations: WRTV, WNDY-TV, WIIH-CD

History
- First air date: July 1, 1954
- Former channel number: Analog: 8 (VHF, 1954–2009)
- Former affiliations: ABC (1954–1956); DuMont (secondary, 1954–1955); NBC (secondary, 1954–1956); CBS (1956–2014); NTA (secondary, 1958–1959)
- Call sign meaning: Pronounced as "wish" (as in making a wish)

Technical information
- Licensing authority: FCC
- Facility ID: 39269
- ERP: 22.8 kW (main signal); 15 kW (fill-in translator)
- HAAT: 284 m (932 ft) (main signal); 190.2 m (624 ft) (fill-in translator)
- Transmitter coordinates: 39°53′25″N 86°12′20″W
- Translator(s): 26 (UHF) Indianapolis

Links
- Public license information: Public file; LMS
- Website: www.wishtv.com

WISH-TV (channel 8) is a television station in Indianapolis, Indiana, United States, affiliated with The CW. It is locally owned by Circle City Broadcasting alongside WRTV (channel 6), WNDY-TV (channel 23), and WIIH-CD (channel 17). The four stations share studios on North Meridian Street (at the north end of the Television Row section) on the near north side of Indianapolis; WISH-TV and WNDY-TV also share transmitter facilities on Walnut Drive in the Augusta section of the city's northwest side (near Meridian Hills).

== History ==
=== Early history ===
The station first signed on the air on July 1, 1954, at 6 p.m. Founded by C. Bruce McConnell—owner of WISH radio (1310 AM, now WTLC)—it was the third television station to sign on in the Indianapolis market, after WFBM-TV (channel 6, now WRTV), which signed on in May 1949 and Bloomington-licensed WTTV (channel 10, now on channel 4), which signed on six months later in November 1949. WISH-TV originally operated as a primary ABC affiliate with a secondary affiliation with DuMont Television Network and NBC. WISH-TV originally transmitted its signal from a tower it shared with WISH radio; the following year, the station constructed a 1,000-foot (305 m) transmitter tower, which allowed the station to improve its signal coverage in the market.

=== CBS affiliate (1956–2014) ===
In 1956, McConnell sold the station to the Indiana Broadcasting Company, the broadcasting subsidiary of J. H. Whitney & Company and owners of WANE-TV in Fort Wayne. The new owners persuaded CBS to move its programming to channel 8, taking that affiliation from WFBM. Conversely that same year, WISH-TV lost the ABC affiliation to WTTV; this resulted in WLBC-TV, channel 49 in Muncie (whose allocation is now occupied by PBS member station WIPB) serving as the de facto ABC affiliate for the northern part of the market as WTTV's signal did not extend very far north outside of Indianapolis's northern suburbs as its transmitter was located farther south than the market's other stations. Also in 1956, WISH became one of the first television stations in the United States to install a videotape machine.

Indiana Broadcasting became the Corinthian Broadcasting Corporation in 1957, with WISH-TV serving as the company's flagship station. From 1958 to 1959, it was an affiliate of the NTA Film Network. Corinthian merged with Dun & Bradstreet in 1971. Dun & Bradstreet sold its entire broadcasting unit to the Belo Corporation in February 1984. However, the merger put Belo two stations over the television ownership limits that the Federal Communications Commission (FCC) had in effect at the time. As a result, the company sold WISH-TV and WANE to LIN Broadcasting (the predecessor of LIN Media) the following month in March 1984. LIN was headquartered in Indianapolis for many years, with WISH-TV serving as that company's flagship television property; the company eventually moved its headquarters to Providence, Rhode Island, in the late 1990s, resulting in WPRI-TV replacing WISH as LIN's flagship station. LIN later acquired low-power independent station W11BV (channel 11, now WIIH-CD on channel 17) in 1992. In 1995, WISH-TV relocated its transmitter to a new tower built in the Augusta section of Indianapolis.

WISH-TV signed on its digital signal on VHF channel 9 on December 17, 1998; two days later on December 19, the station broadcast its first program in high definition when it broadcast an NFL game telecast in the format. In 2002, WISH-TV began handling the master control operations of WANE-TV and fellow sister station WLFI-TV in Lafayette, Indiana. The hub expanded to include the Buffalo duopoly of WIVB-TV and WNLO in October, with other LIN-owned stations gradually being added to the WISH hub by the summer of 2003.

On February 10, 2005, the Paramount Stations Group subsidiary of Viacom sold UPN affiliate WNDY-TV (channel 23, now a MyNetworkTV affiliate) as well as its Columbus, Ohio, sister station WWHO to LIN TV for $85 million, creating a duopoly with WISH-TV when the sale was finalized that spring. On May 18, 2007, the LIN TV Corporation announced that it was exploring strategic alternatives that could have resulted in the sale of the company.

On September 15, 2008, LIN and Time Warner Cable entered into an impasse during negotiations to renew retransmission consent deals for some of the group's television stations. Bright House Networks, one of two major cable providers serving Indianapolis, negotiates retransmission consent contracts through Time Warner Cable. LIN TV requested compensation for carriage of its stations in a manner similar to the deals that cable networks have with pay television providers, as other broadcast station owners began to seek compensation from cable and satellite providers for their programming. The carriage agreement with Bright House expired on October 2. By 12:35 a.m. on October 3, LIN's television stations were replaced on Time Warner Cable systems in markets where the group owns stations and where either provider operates systems with programming from other cable channels. LIN's stations (with the exception of WIIH-CA) were restored 26 days later on October 29 through a new carriage agreement reached between Time Warner Cable and LIN TV.

The station shut down its analog signal, over VHF channel 8, on June 12, 2009, the official date on which full-power television in the United States transitioned from analog to digital broadcasts under federal mandate. The station's digital signal continued to broadcast on its pre-transition VHF channel 9, using virtual channel 8.

On August 7, 2009, WISH-TV began operating a Mobile DTV feed of subchannel 8.1, which originally was only accessible via an app for BlackBerry devices.

On January 29, 2010, LIN TV filed an application to the FCC to operate a digital fill-in translator on UHF channel 17, an allotment that was previously occupied by the analog signal of Class A sister station WIIH-CA; the FCC granted a construction permit to build the translator's transmitter facilities on June 16. The translator, which shares the same transmitter facility as WISH's main signal in the Augusta section of Indianapolis and began operating on January 13, 2011, serves parts of Indianapolis that lost signal coverage after the 2009 digital transition. The translator is mapped as virtual channel 8, which results in virtual channel duplication while tuning sequentially on digital tuners in areas that are able to receive both signals, as the translator simulcasts WISH-TV's main channel and its two digital subchannels. As mentioned above, in late March 2015, a simulcast of WISH's main signal was added via WNDY-DT3.

On March 21, 2014, Media General announced that it would buy LIN Media in a $1.6 billion deal, described as a merger. The merger was completed on December 19.

=== CW station (2015–present) ===
On August 11, 2014, Tribune Broadcasting announced that CW affiliate WTTV would become the market's CBS affiliate on January 1, 2015, as part of an agreement that also renewed the CBS affiliations on Tribune-owned stations in five other markets. The deal, which resulted in the end of WISH-TV's 58-year relationship with CBS, was reportedly struck as a result of WISH station management balking at the network's demands for sharing of retransmission consent revenue from its affiliates. This marked the second time in Indianapolis television history that WTTV took an affiliation from WISH, the first being ABC in 1956.

As the other major broadcast networks had existing affiliation deals with other area stations (WRTV's ABC affiliation was up for renewal around this time, though the E. W. Scripps Company reached an agreement to allow WRTV and nine of the company's other stations to remain with ABC the day prior to the announcement), WISH announced on December 11, 2014, that it would become an independent station upon losing the CBS affiliation, filling timeslots previously occupied by network shows with additional newscasts and an expanded inventory of syndicated talk shows, newsmagazines, and sitcoms, including some shows relocated from sister station WNDY-TV to make up for the loss of CBS daytime and late-night programs on channel 8's schedule and a national news program from TouchVision (the latter of which was later replaced with an additional half-hour of the station's morning newscast, 24-Hour News 8's Daybreak, on July 13, 2015) to serve as a replacement for the CBS Morning News.

Alternate logo featuring The CW's branding.

However, on December 22, 2014, Tribune announced that it would sell the market's CW affiliation to Media General—the deal occurred three days after the completion of the company's merger with LIN. As a result, WISH instead became a CW affiliate, in effect switching affiliations with WTTV and preventing a situation in which The CW, which WTTV originally planned on carrying over its second digital subchannel (which had previously been affiliated with This TV prior to December 2014), would be relegated to the lower digital subchannel tier on local cable systems and probable subjection to non-carriage by satellite providers for months until carriage agreements were struck. The loss of WISH's CBS affiliation also affected the Media General-LIN merger, with the purchase price being lowered by $110 million in stock, though no other factors were affected.

Media General signed an agreement with Sony Pictures Entertainment to affiliate several of its stations with Get. WISH added the network on its .2 subchannel on February 1, 2016.

==== Nexstar ownership ====
After a failed bid for Media General to merge with Meredith Corporation, Nexstar Broadcasting acquired Media General in January 2017. The WISH-WNDY duopoly gained new sister stations in nearby markets within Indiana: the Evansville virtual duopoly of ABC affiliate WEHT and fellow CW affiliate WTVW, and the Terre Haute virtual duopoly of NBC affiliate WTWO and ABC affiliate WAWV-TV. CBS affiliate WANE-TV in Fort Wayne was the only existing sister station of WISH and WNDY that became part of the combined group, as Media General and Nexstar each sold certain Indiana stations they already owned (Nexstar's Fox affiliate WFFT-TV in Fort Wayne and Media General's two other Indiana-based CBS affiliates, WTHI-TV in Terre Haute and WLFI-TV in Lafayette to Heartland Media, and Nexstar's WEVV-TV in Evansville to Bayou City Broadcasting) to alleviate conflicts with FCC ownership rules.

In late March 2015, Media General added a 1080i HD simulcast feed of WISH's main signal on the 23.3 subchannel of WNDY-TV, mainly for the convenience of over-the-air viewers, especially those unable to receive WISH's VHF channel 9 signal due to signal limitations by way of their geographic location in proximity to the transmitter and/or a lack of an antenna able to properly receive VHF signals. In January 2016, the station converted the subchannel from a 24-hour feed of its Doppler radar into an affiliate of the Justice Network.

=== Sale to Circle City Broadcasting ===
On December 3, 2018, Nexstar announced it would acquire the assets of Chicago-based Tribune Media—which had owned Fox affiliate WXIN (channel 59) since July 1996 and CBS affiliate WTTV since July 2002—for $6.4 billion in cash and debt. Due to FCC ownership rules, Nexstar could not retain both duopolies. On April 8, 2019, it was announced that Circle City Broadcasting (owned by DuJuan McCoy of Indianapolis, the then-principal owner of the aforementioned, now defunct, Bayou City Broadcasting) would acquire WISH and WNDY for $42.5 million. The WTTV/WXIN duopoly was longer-established and Nexstar opted to keep that duopoly over WISH/WNDY. The sale was completed on September 19, 2019, effectively separating it from WANE-TV after 62 years as sister stations.

In October 2025, E. W. Scripps Company announced it had agreed to sell WRTV for $83 million to Circle City Broadcasting. The sale was approved on February 27, 2026, and completed on March 31, giving CCB ownership of three full-power television station licenses in Indianapolis.

== Programming ==
=== Sports programming ===
In its later years as a CBS affiliate, WISH-TV aired most Indianapolis Colts regular season games as well as any playoff games involving the team through CBS, via the network's broadcast rights to the NFL's American Football Conference. The move of Colts games to WISH-TV when CBS acquired the rights to the AFC in 1998 coincided with the debut of rookie quarterback Peyton Manning, as well as the station's coverage of the Colts' victory in Super Bowl XLI and appearance in Super Bowl XLIV. WISH-TV also aired Indiana Pacers games from their absorption into the NBA from 1976 until 1990, through CBS' NBA broadcast contract. The station provided local coverage of the 1987 Pan-American Games, which were held in Indianapolis. WISH-TV also provided local coverage of the 1991, 1997, 2000, 2006, and 2010 NCAA Men's Final Fours.

As a result of WISH swapping its CBS affiliation with CW affiliate WTTV in January 2015, the station's status as the unofficial "home" station of the Colts ended after the 2014 NFL regular season. Consequently, it no longer aired any Colts related programming after the 2014 season (except for Countdown to Kickoff and possibly Huddle Up Indy), nor were WISH and WNDY affiliated with the Colts. Colts games began to air on WTTV on January 4, 2015, when the Colts defeated the Cincinnati Bengals in the first round of the NFL playoffs. The coach's show and Colts Up Close moved to WTTV and its sister Fox affiliate WXIN (channel 59) for the 2015 NFL season.

After losing CBS, WISH gradually cobbled together agreements to restore sports events onto the station's schedule to make up for both the loss of sports coverage provided by CBS as well as the absence of such content from The CW's schedule. First on February 17, 2015, WISH signed a two-year agreement with the Indy Eleven to carry home matches from the North American Soccer League team during the 2015 and 2016 seasons; WISH replaced sister station WNDY as the Eleven's local television broadcaster, as that station carried the team's games during its inaugural 2014 season. All game telecasts and a half-hour post-game show that follows each game are produced under an outsourcing agreement with Indianapolis-based video production firm WebStream Sports. The first Indy Eleven game to air on WISH was the April 11 home season opener with the New York Cosmos.

On March 20, 2015, Media General announced that WISH and WNDY would become part of the Chicago Cubs and White Sox broadcast television networks and carry many of the games the teams broadcast locally in the Chicago market through ABC owned-and-operated station WLS-TV, then-fellow CW affiliate WGN-TV and later dual CW/MyNetworkTV affiliate WPWR-TV (excluding those broadcast by the cable/satellite-only Comcast SportsNet Chicago). WISH carries a Sunday-only schedule of games due to program preemption restrictions within its CW affiliation contract, with WNDY airing the remainder of the weekday game schedule and a few Sunday games. The deal for carriage of the games in Indianapolis was required after Tribune Broadcasting discontinued airing sports events involving Chicago-area teams over its WGN America cable channel at the end of 2014. Both of Chicago's Major League Baseball teams claim Indianapolis as part of their broadcasting territories, sharing the market with the Cincinnati Reds, which have games that originate on Fox Sports Ohio carried by sister network Fox Sports Indiana.

On June 30, 2015, WISH reached an agreement to carry Atlantic Coast Conference college football and basketball games produced by Raycom Sports (via the syndicator's ACC Network service) effective with the 2015–16 ACC football season, as Indianapolis is in the ACC market covered by the Notre Dame Fighting Irish. The first ACC game to air on the station through this deal was the September 5 game between the Wofford Terriers and Clemson Tigers. On October 6, Media General announced that WISH would carry NHL games involving the Chicago Blackhawks produced by WGN-TV, with an initial slate of 19 Saturday and Sunday games during the 2015–16 season starting with the team's October 10 game against the New York Islanders. This marked the first time outside of Canadian cable distribution quirks involving WGN-TV that WGN's Blackhawks coverage aired outside the Chicago market (WGN America never carried Blackhawks telecasts).

=== News operation ===
WISH-TV presently broadcasts 85 hours of locally produced newscasts and programs each week (with 14 hours each weekday, seven hours on Saturdays and eight hours on Sundays). In regards to the number of hours devoted to news programming, it is the second-highest newscast output of any broadcast television station in the entire United States, behind Los Angeles CW owned-and-operated station KTLA (channel 5), which broadcasts 94 hours, 20 minutes of local newscasts per week; it also has the highest newscast output of any single television station in the Indianapolis market and the state of Indiana.

In 1963, WISH-TV became the first television station in the market to provide extensive live coverage of a major local news event, when it covered the deadly explosion at the Fairgrounds Coliseum. WISH-TV's newscasts were the highest-rated in the Indianapolis market from the mid-1980s until WTHR overtook it for the No. 1 position in 2002. The station's ratings success was largely attributed to the longevity of most of its news staff, some of whom have been at the station for over 20 years. Mike Ahern was the station's main weeknight news anchor as well as the de facto face of its newsroom for more than 30 years (the longest tenure of anyone in Indianapolis television history); he joined channel 8 as a reporter in 1967 and was promoted to lead anchor in 1974, where he remained until his retirement from the anchor chair on December 1, 2004 (Ahern later hosted sister station WNDY's now-cancelled interview program One on One). Debby Knox joined Ahern as co-anchor on the weeknight newscasts in 1980 and remained with the station until she retired on November 26, 2013. Stan Wood served as the station's main weather forecaster from the 1960s until 1991, while Patty Spitler served as anchor of the noon newscast and entertainment reporter from 1982 to 2004. Lee Giles, who left the station in 2004, was one of the longest-tenured news directors in local broadcasting.

For a time during the 1990s, WISH-TV advertised that "more people in Central Indiana get their local news from 24-Hour News 8 than from any other source" at the close of many of its newscasts and in promos for its newscasts. The station's local newscasts are currently at a distant second place behind WTHR in most timeslots, except during the 5 to 6:30 p.m. period on weeknights, when both stations maintain a much tighter viewership margin. However, due to the strength of CBS' prime time lineup in the 2000s and 2010s (as well as the fact its late news served the lead-in for Indianapolis native David Letterman's late night talk show on the network, the Late Show), WISH regained the lead in the 11 p.m. slot. The station's "I-Team 8" investigative reports have earned the station numerous journalism awards, including Regional Emmy, Peabody and Edward R. Murrow Awards (the station was awarded the latter in 1998 and 2006). In 2008, the Indiana Associated Press Broadcast Association honored WISH-TV with the "Outstanding News Operation" and "Outstanding Weather Operation" designations.

In 1990, WISH-TV implemented the "24-Hour News Source" concept that was originally developed that year by WEWS-TV in Cleveland; the format, which began spreading to other television stations nationwide around that timeframe, involves the production of 30-second news updates that air at or near the top of every hour during local commercial break inserts – even during prime time network and overnight programming – in addition to the station's long-form newscasts in regularly scheduled timeslots. The station continues to use the format (which is reinforced in the branding that the station has used for its news programming off-and-on since 1990, 24-Hour News 8, and all but one of the varying news slogans it had used from 1990 to 2014), even as stations elsewhere had discontinued the hourly update format by the early 2000s. However, as of June 4, 2018, WISH-TV has dropped the 24-Hour moniker from its newscast name (the moniker part of its slogan has been dropped for years).

When LIN TV purchased WNDY-TV in 2005, the station was airing a 10 p.m. newscast produced by WTHR. The contract between the two stations expired, and on February 28, 2005, WISH-TV began producing a newscast for the station. WISH extended its news presence on WNDY-TV twice between 2008 and 2014. In 2008, it debuted a morning newscast extension from 7 to 8 a.m. The WISH-produced 10 p.m. newscast expanded from 30 minutes to an hour in January 2014, with the last 15 minutes serving as a local sports program, Sports Zone Tonight.

On September 8, 2008, WISH-TV became the second television station in Indiana to begin broadcasting its local newscasts in high definition; the WNDY newscasts were included in the upgrade. On September 9, 2013, WISH-TV added a half-hour to its weekday morning newscast at 4:30 a.m., becoming the last English-language news-producing station in the market to expand its morning newscast to a pre-5 a.m. timeslot (WTHR had an eight-year head start, expanding its morning newscast into the 4:30 slot in 2005; that station was later joined by WXIN in 2009 and WRTV in 2010. WTTV became the last station in the market, again, to air a pre-5 a.m. timeslot when their news operation debuted in 2015).

When it became an affiliate of The CW on January 1, 2015, WISH-TV expanded its news programming by 20 hours (increasing its weekly total from 34 to 54 hours a week). Most existing newscasts were retained, though the 7 a.m. and 10 p.m. newscasts it produced for WNDY moved to channel 8 (the former of which is part of an expansion of Daybreak that extended the weekday edition of the program by two hours and the weekend editions by one), while the noon newscast expanded to one hour and a 6:30 p.m. newscast on weeknights was added. The weekend 6 and 10 p.m. newscasts were also shortened to a half-hour, with the Sports Locker being moved to bookending the latter and the 11 p.m. news on Sunday nights, and a new sports program (Indy Sports Tonight) taking up 15 minutes of the 11 p.m. news.

==== Notable former on-air staff ====
- Mike Barz – anchor/reporter
- Chet Coppock – sportscaster (1974–1981)
- Nicole Manske – sports anchor/reporter (2004–2006)
- Mark Patrick – sports director (1990–1999)
- Jane Pauley – weekend anchor (1972–1975)
- Rolland Smith – anchor (1967–1969)
- Sage Steele – sports reporter (1997–1998)
- John Stehr – anchor
- Anne Marie Tiernon – anchor/reporter (1991–2000)

=== Local Weather Station ===
WISH-TV originally launched digital subchannel 8.2 in 2005 as an over-the-air feed of its 24-hour weather service, LWS (or "Local Weather Station"); formatted similarly to the now-defunct SkyTrak Weather Network service previously operated by WTHR and its low-power sister station WALV-CD (channel 46), the service also began to be simulcast on low-power sister station WIIH-CA on January 1, 2009, after that station lost its Univision affiliation; WIIH-CA dropped the service when it was converted into a fill-in translator of WISH-TV in January 2011. Until February 2016, Channel 8 carried a half-hour simulcast of the LWS service on its primary channel on Friday nights/early Saturday mornings.

== Technical information and subchannels ==
WISH-TV and WNDY-TV share transmitter facilities on Walnut Drive in the Augusta neighborhood of northwest Indianapolis. The high-power VHF signal on channel 9 and a digital replacement translator on UHF channel 26 emanate from this site. The stations' signals are multiplexed:

Subchannels of WISH-TV and WNDY-TV
| License | Subchannel | Res. | Short name | Programming |
|---|---|---|---|---|
| WISH-TV | 8.1 | 1080i | WISH-HD | The CW |
| WISH-TV | 8.2 | 480i | getTV | Great (4:3) |
| WISH-TV | 8.3 | 480i | Confess | Confess (WIIH-CD) |
| WISH-TV | 8.4 | 480i | DIYA | Diya TV |
| WNDY-TV | 23.1 | 720p | My INDY | Main WNDY-TV programming |
| WNDY-TV | 23.2 | 480i | RADAR | Radar |
| WNDY-TV | 23.3 | 480i | WISHNET | Independent |

Simulcast of subchannels of another station
