= WTTV =

Television station in Bloomington, Indiana

WTTV and WTTK

WTTV: Bloomington, Indiana; WTTK: Kokomo–Indianapolis, Indiana; United States
- Channels for WTTV: Digital: 27 (UHF); Virtual: 4
- Channels for WTTK: Digital: 15 (UHF); Virtual: 29
- Branding: CBS 4; CBS 4 News; The Dot (4.2/29.2)

Programming
- Affiliations: 4.1/29.1: CBS; for others, see § Technical information

Ownership
- Owner: Nexstar Media Group; (Tribune Media Company)
- Sister stations: WXIN; Tegna: WTHR, WALV-CD

History
- First air date: WTTV: November 11, 1949; WTTK: May 1, 1988
- Former call signs: WTTK: WWKI-TV (1985–1987)
- Former channel number: WTTV: Analog: 10 (VHF, 1949–1954), 4 (VHF, 1954–2009); Digital: 48 (UHF, 2001–2019); WTTK: Analog: 29 (UHF, 1988–2009); Digital: 54 (UHF, 2003–2009), 29 (UHF, 2009–2019)
- Former affiliations: WTTV: NBC (1949–1956); ABC (secondary, 1949–1954); DuMont (secondary, 1949–1956); ABC (1956–1957); Independent (1957–1995, January–April 1998); UPN (1995–January 1998); The WB (April 1998–2006); The CW (2006–2014); WTTK: Independent (1988–1995, January–April 1998); UPN (1995–January 1998); The WB (April 1998–2006); The CW (2006–2014)
- Call sign meaning: WTTV: Tarzian Television (after founding owner, Sarkes Tarzian); WTTK: WTTV Kokomo

Technical information
- Licensing authority: FCC
- Facility ID: WTTV: 56523; WTTK: 56526
- ERP: WTTV: 1,000 kW; WTTK: 450 kW
- HAAT: WTTV: 360 m (1,181 ft); WTTK: 304 m (997 ft)
- Transmitter coordinates: WTTV: 39°24′27″N 86°8′52″W; WTTK: 39°53′20″N 86°12′7″W

Links
- Public license information: WTTV: Public file; LMS; WTTK: Public file; LMS
- Website: fox59.com

WTTV (channel 4) in Bloomington, Indiana, and WTTK (channel 29) in Kokomo, Indiana, are television stations serving as the CBS affiliates for Central Indiana, including the Indianapolis area. They are owned by Nexstar Media Group alongside Fox affiliate WXIN (channel 59); Nexstar's Tegna subsidiary owns NBC affiliate WTHR (channel 13) and low-power, Class A MeTV affiliate WALV-CD (channel 46). WTTV and WXIN share studios on Network Place (near 71st Street and I-465) in northwestern Indianapolis. WTTV's transmitter is located on State Road 252 in Trafalgar, while WTTK's transmitter sits on West 73rd Street on the northern outskirts of Indianapolis.

WTTK operates as a full-time satellite of WTTV; its existence is only acknowledged in station identifications. WTTK was originally used to bring WTTV's programming to areas of central Indiana that had trouble receiving the main WTTV signal (including Kokomo, Muncie and Lafayette). However, with the transmitter's relocation into Marion County, it nearly duplicates the signal contours of ABC affiliate WRTV (channel 6), CW affiliate WISH-TV (channel 8), NBC affiliate WTHR (channel 13), MyNetworkTV affiliate WNDY-TV (channel 23), and WXIN. Despite Kokomo being WTTK's city of license, there has never been any physical office or employees located in that area.

== History ==
=== Early history ===
WTTV first signed on the air on November 11, 1949, originally broadcasting on VHF channel 10. It was the second television station to sign on in the state of Indiana, debuting almost 6 1/2 months after WFBM-TV (now WRTV) signed on in May 1949. It has made the claim to being Indiana's oldest "continuously operating" television station because WFBM-TV had experienced a transmitter failure which took it off the air for an extended period of time shortly after WTTV signed on. Owned by Sarkes Tarzian, a Bloomington-based radio manufacturer and broadcaster, the station originally operated as a primary NBC affiliate with secondary affiliations with ABC and the DuMont Television Network. It also aired programming from CBS on occasion.

WTTV originally transmitted its signal from its studio just south of downtown Bloomington, shared with sister station WTTS (1370 AM, now WWZN), which went on the air in March 1949. Sarkes Tarzian built a new studio and transmitter on the north end of the Tarzian factory property on Bloomington's south side in 1952. Also that same year the release of the FCC's Sixth Report and Order, which ended a four-year suspension of television station permit and license awards, also saw a reallocation of VHF channel assignments across the United States—including in Bloomington, where WTTV was forced to move from channel 10 to the newly assigned channel 4. The switch took effect on February 21, 1954, and as a result, WTTV's transmitter was moved to a 1,000-foot (305 m) tower near Cloverdale, and the power was increased to 100,000 watts. The station's former channel 10 allocation was moved to Terre Haute and awarded to WTHI-TV, which signed on in July 1954.

In its early years, instead of buying most of the expensive items needed to run a television station, Tarzian had his own engineers and technicians design and build the items needed. For example, an overhead microphone boom cost approximately $300. Tarzian employees built one for less than $30. When Tarzian decided to start broadcasting network programs, establishing a coaxial cable link from Cincinnati would prove impractical, so Tarzian built his own microwave relay system from Cincinnati to Bloomington.

The station lost the ABC affiliation after WISH-TV signed on in July 1954. In 1956, the station lost the NBC affiliation to WFBM-TV; WTTV rejoined ABC after WISH-TV took a primary affiliation with CBS. That same year, it relocated its studio facilities to a site at Bluff Road on the south side of Indianapolis, although the station retained its studios on the Tarzian property in Bloomington as an auxiliary site for many years afterward. In the late 1950s, the station began producing some of its local programs in color; WTTV would convert to full color broadcasts in the fall of 1965, after it purchased color-capable camera equipment.

The station activated its current tower in Trafalgar, the tallest structure in Indiana at 1,132 feet (345 m) above ground level, in 1957; WTTV was joined on the tower by a new radio station, Bloomington-licensed WTTV-FM (92.3 FM, now WTTS) in 1960. The transmitter facility is located farther south than Indianapolis' other major television stations due to FCC regulations that require a station's transmitter site be located no more than 15 miles (24 km) from its city of license—in this case, Bloomington, which is 50.5 miles (81.3 km) south of Indianapolis. WTTV only provided a grade B ("rimshot") signal to the city's northern suburbs and could not be seen at all in the far northern portions of the market. As a result, most of these areas only got a clear signal from channel 4 when cable television arrived in central Indiana in the late 1960s. Because of this rule, when WTTV regained the ABC affiliation, WLBC-TV in Muncie (channel 49, allocation now occupied by PBS member station WIPB) served as the de facto ABC affiliate for the northern part of the market.

=== As an independent station ===
On October 30, 1957, WTTV became an independent station after losing the ABC affiliation to upstart WLWI (channel 13, now WTHR). In its early years as an independent, WTTV began running a test pattern at 2 p.m. until regular programming began at 4 p.m. The station initially ran older movies and low-budget syndicated programs as well as some of its own locally produced programming. By the 1970s, WTTV began signing on by 6 a.m. and stayed on the air until at least 2 am. In addition to local programming, WTTV aired plenty of movies during the early afternoon and in prime time. It also aired cartoons, which were mixed in with locally produced children's programs in the afternoons from 3 to 5 p.m. as well as off-network sitcoms in the evenings.

As cable expanded in the Midwest during the 1970s, WTTV became a regional superstation. At its height, it was available on nearly every cable system in Indiana outside the Chicago metropolitan area, which contained Northwest Indiana. It was also carried in large portions of Ohio and Kentucky, including Cincinnati, Columbus, Dayton, and Louisville. Due to the syndication exclusivity rule, it disappeared from most cable systems outside Indiana (except for the Kentucky side of the Evansville market) in the late 1980s.

Sarkes Tarzian sold WTTV to Teleco for $26.5 million in September 1978 (while retaining the radio stations, which are still owned by Tarzian as of 2025); the station was then sold to the Tel-Am Corporation in March 1984. In December 1978, Broadcasting reported that NBC was considering either WTTV or WTHR as potential replacement affiliates for WRTV, which was in the process of switching from NBC to ABC. NBC ultimately reached an agreement to shift the affiliation to outgoing ABC affiliate WTHR, effective June 1, 1979. By the mid-1980s, WTTV began airing more cartoons and first-run syndicated talk shows during the daytime, as well as an increased number of recent off-network sitcoms during the evening. The station also began broadcasting 24 hours a day of programming by that time. Although it was one of the strongest independent stations in the country, WTTV opted against affiliating with the upstart Fox network in 1986—one of the few long-established independents to do so. This was mainly because most of the markets in its large cable footprint had enough stations to provide Fox affiliates of their own, making the prospect of being a multi-state Fox affiliate unattractive to channel 4. The Fox affiliation in the Indianapolis market instead went to eventual sister station WXIN (channel 59), which became a charter affiliate of the network when it launched on October 9 of that year.

In 1987, Tel-Am purchased the construction permit for WWKI-TV (channel 29) in Kokomo, 52 miles (84 km) north of Indianapolis, from B.G.S. Broadcasting. B.G.S., who also owned WWKI radio (100.5 FM) until 1986, had concluded that there were not nearly enough viewers in north-central Indiana for WWKI-TV to be viable as a standalone station, and its merger with WTTV allowed channel 29 to come on the air. On May 1, 1988, Tel-Am signed channel 29 on as WTTK, a full-time satellite of WTTV, to improve its over-the-air coverage in northern portions of the market that could not receive the WTTV signal. Tel-Am filed for bankruptcy in 1987; Raleigh, North Carolina–based Capitol Broadcasting Company purchased WTTV and WTTK in July 1988, after an attempt to sell the station to locally based Emmis Communications fell through. The stations were then sold to River City Broadcasting in 1991. The station carried PTEN programming through that entity's full existence.

=== From UPN to The WB ===
WTTV became a charter affiliate of the United Paramount Network (UPN) when the network launched on January 16, 1995. In April 1996, River City Broadcasting merged with the Sinclair Broadcast Group in a $1.2 billion deal. However, due to FCC regulations at that time which prohibited the common ownership of two full-power commercial television stations in the same market, Sinclair had to obtain a cross-ownership waiver to retain ownership of WTTV/WTTK and the company's existing Indianapolis station, inTV affiliate WIIB (channel 63, now Ion Television station WIPX-TV), which the company eventually sold to DP Media two years later.

In 1997, Sinclair signed a deal with The WB to affiliate with several UPN-affiliated and independent stations that the company either managed or owned outright. While WTTV was not included in the original deal, Sinclair subsequently notified UPN that it was not interested in renewing the station's affiliation, leading network sister company Paramount Stations Group to strike a deal to buy WB charter affiliate WNDY-TV (channel 23), though Paramount pledged at the time to keep WNDY a WB affiliate through the expiration of its contract in January 1999. WTTV temporarily returned to being an independent station when its contract with UPN expired on January 16, 1998, filling its prime time schedule with movies; on January 22, WNDY began to carry UPN programming in addition to The WB. WTTV then replaced WNDY as the market's WB affiliate on April 6, 1998, and changed its on-air branding to "WB 4 Indiana"; channel 23 then became a full-time UPN affiliate.

As The WB pushed for market exclusivity for its local affiliates as the network increased its national distribution beyond the Tribune Company's television stations and the superstation feed of its Chicago affiliate (and Tribune flagship station) WGN-TV, Sinclair decided to wind down carriage agreements that the station had with cable providers located outside of the Indianapolis market. The station remained available on cable systems on the Indiana side of the Terre Haute market until 2017, when it was replaced by WTHI-DT3 as a new CW affiliate for the market, with The CW moving to now-sister station WTWO's second subchannel in 2024 as Nexstar consolidated the network onto its own stations where possible.

WTTV's "Indiana's WB4" logo, used from 2003 to 2006.

On April 19, 2002, Sinclair Broadcast Group sold WTTV and WTTK to Tribune Broadcasting for $125 million, creating the market's first television duopoly under current FCC regulations with Fox affiliate WXIN; the purchase was finalized on July 24 of that year (Tribune held an ownership interest in The WB at the time; however, WTTV could not technically be considered an owned-and-operated station since Time Warner held a 78% majority interest in the network).

Although WTTV was the longer-established of the two stations, Tribune chose to keep the Fox affiliation on WXIN due in part to WTTV's then-weaker analog signal in the northern part of the market. Additionally, the NFL on Fox, until the 2014 implementation of Fox/CBS cross-flex scheduling, could only carry two Indianapolis Colts home games with National Football Conference (NFC) opponents each year as the team is part of the National Football League's American Football Conference (AFC), so the need for Fox to have an analog-era VHF affiliate in the market was less important than if it was an NFC market. WTTV merged its operations with those of WXIN in 2004, when the latter moved its operations into new facilities at 6910 Network Place at the Intech Park office development on the city's northwest side. The old WTTV facility on Bluff Road remained abandoned until being razed in 2016.

=== CW affiliation ===
On January 24, 2006, Time Warner and CBS Corporation (which split from Viacom in December 2005) and the Warner Bros. Entertainment unit of Time Warner announced that they would dissolve The WB and UPN (which CBS had acquired one month earlier in December 2005 following its split from the original Viacom), and combine the respective programming of both networks to create a new "fifth" network, The CW. The network signed a ten-year agreement with Tribune to affiliate with 16 of the 19 WB-affiliated stations that the company had owned at the time, including WTTV/WTTK; WTTV/WTTK became the market's CW affiliate when the network launched on September 18, 2006; its on-air branding was also changed to "CW 4". In August 2008, the station rebranded as "Indiana's 4" as part of a corporate effort by Tribune to strengthen the local branding of its stations and reduce the dependence on the use of references to The CW in its stations' branding in part due to the network's weak national ratings.

=== Affiliation switch with WISH-TV ===
On August 11, 2014, CBS and Tribune Broadcasting announced that WTTV would become Indianapolis' CBS affiliate beginning on January 1, 2015. The deal, which was part of an agreement that also renewed the CBS affiliations on Tribune-owned stations in four other markets, including WTKR, which was owned by Dreamcatcher Broadcasting and operated by Tribune through a shared services agreement (SSA), was driven by CBS's desire for reverse retransmission consent compensation from its affiliates; WISH-TV had been in negotiations to renew its agreement with the network, but station management reportedly balked at CBS' demands. This led to CBS reaching a deal with WTTV, which Tribune was eager to land since until 2023, the network held the broadcast television rights to the AFC, which included rights to most of the Indianapolis Colts' regular season games. In 2023, the Sunday afternoon packages for Fox and CBS became non-conference-specific, still allowing both WTTV and WXIN to carry the bulk of Colts games throughout the season.

This marked the second time that WTTV has taken a network affiliation away from WISH, the first being ABC in 1956.

After initially announcing plans to move The CW to its second digital subchannel, Tribune announced on December 22, that it would instead sell the CW affiliation in the market to WISH-TV's owner, Media General (which finalized its merger with that station's longtime owner, LIN Media, three days earlier); as a result, WISH effectively swapped affiliations with WTTV and became a CW affiliate. The first CBS program to air on WTTV was a repeat of Indianapolis native David Letterman's talk show, the Late Show, which aired at 12:15 a.m. on January 1; Letterman concluded his run on the show in May.

In preparation for the move to CBS, WTTV announced that it would change its branding from "Indiana's 4" to "CBS 4" upon affiliating with the network.

=== Sale to Nexstar Media Group ===
After a failed attempt by Sinclair Broadcast Group to acquire Tribune Media, Nexstar Media Group—which had subsumed Media General's WISH and WNDY in 2017—announced in December 2018 that it would acquire the company. Due to FCC ownership rules and scrutiny, Nexstar was required to divest two of the stations: the company ultimately elected to sell WISH and WNDY to the owner of Bayou City Broadcasting, in favor of retaining WTTV and WXIN. The sale was completed on September 19, 2019.

On August 19, 2025, Nexstar Media Group agreed to acquire Tegna for $6.2 billion. In Indianapolis, Tegna already owned WTHR and WALV-CD. The deal was approved and completed in March 2026. As part of the transaction, Nexstar committed to the divestiture of WTHR within two years, along with five other stations, mostly in markets where the two companies combined held four TV station licenses.

== Subchannel history ==
=== WTTV-DT2/WTTK-DT2 ===
WTTV-DT2 is an independent television station, which operates as a second digital subchannel of WTTV and WTTK. Over-the-air, it broadcasts in standard definition on channel 4.2 over WTTV and channel 29.2 over WTTK. Branded as "The Dot", the subchannel is available on Comcast Xfinity digital channel 252; although it maintains an independently programmed general entertainment format, the subchannel is not currently available on Charter Spectrum or AT&T U-verse within the Indianapolis market, resulting in some of WTTV-DT2's programming not being available to those that do not subscribe to Comcast or use an antenna to receive WTTV/WTTK over-the-air.

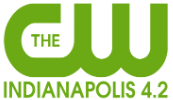
Planned logo for CW subchannel originally planned to launch as part of WTTV's switch to CBS.

The station's digital subchannel on 4.2/29.2 first launched as an affiliate of The Tube Music Network in the fall of 2006, as part of the network's group affiliation deal with Tribune Broadcasting; after The Tube shut down on October 1, 2007, the subchannel switched to a standard definition simulcast of WTTV/WTTK's main channel to provide a quality signal for cable providers before they began instead to downscale the HD feed into standard definition. In November 2009, the 4.2/29.2 subchannel became an affiliate of This TV (which Tribune later acquired a 50% ownership interest in November 2013).

After Tribune agreed to affiliate WTTV with CBS, the station originally announced plans to shift its existing CW affiliation to WTTV/WTTK's second digital subchannel upon the switch. This would have made Indianapolis the largest market where The CW was carried as a subchannel-only affiliation, a title held from the network's 2006 launch by Cincinnati, where CBS affiliate WKRC-TV carries the network on its second subchannel, until May 2017, when San Diego CBS affiliate KFMB-TV began carrying The CW over its DT2 feed. On December 7, 2014, This TV moved from WTTV's 4.2 subchannel to a newly created 59.3 subchannel on WXIN, with 4.2 simulcasting the station's primary feed pending the planned move of CW programming to the subchannel.

After Tribune chose to sell the CW affiliation rights for the Indianapolis market to Media General and swap affiliations with WISH-TV, WTTV then announced that it would instead program the 4.2 subchannel as an independent station. This saved Tribune the burden of acquiring prime cable carriage for the subchannel, losing any available viewership for The CW's programming, or having to enter into carriage negotiations with AT&T U-verse, Dish Network and DirecTV to add the subchannel in the first place, as digital subchannels are traditionally not carried on IPTV or satellite providers unless affiliated with a major broadcast network. As a result, to fulfill programming contracts, most of WTTV's existing syndicated programming inventory (including talk shows, drama series and sitcoms) that could no longer air on the station's main schedule due to the heavy schedule of network programming it committed to air via its new CBS affiliation, programming that was considered "downmarket", and its new slate of local news programming was moved to digital channel 4.2/29.2 when the subchannel was converted into a general entertainment format on January 1, 2015, along with other syndicated shows not carried by WTTV prior to the switch. The "Indiana's 4" branding and logo used by WTTV as a CW affiliate from 2008 to 2014 was also adopted for use by the subchannel.

In the fall of 2021, the channel rebranded to "The Dot" without numerical demarcation, to remove any confusion with channel 4.1, and acknowledging the channel is rarely found in the one or two-digit tier of a pay television lineup.

=== WTTV-DT3/WTTK-DT3 ===
On October 20, 2015, Tribune Broadcasting reached an agreement with former WTTV owner Sinclair Broadcast Group to carry the latter group's science fiction-focused multicast network Comet on its stations in Indianapolis, Hartford and Denver. When the network launched on October 31, 2015, WTTV debuted a digital subchannel on virtual channel 4.3/29.3 to serve as an affiliate of Comet. On March 2, 2020, 29.3 became a Cozi TV affiliate while 4.3 continued as a Comet affiliate, separating the two channels' programming.

== Programming ==
WTTV clears the entire CBS schedule; this differs from WISH-TV, which preempted select programs from the network and passed them to sister station WNDY from 2005 to 2014.

=== Sports programming ===
For over half a century, WTTV was central Indiana's home for college basketball games from the Big Ten Conference, with a focus on games involving Indiana University and Purdue University. Until the late 1990s, it produced telecasts of Hoosiers and Boilermakers games, earning it the nickname of "Indiana's Sports Station". In fact, many cable providers in Indiana began carrying WTTV simply so viewers across the state could watch the Hoosiers and Boilermakers. Due to cost-cutting measures in the 1990s, channel 4 shuttered its in-house productions and opted instead for syndication deals with Raycom Sports and ESPN Plus. WTTV also presented other Big Ten football and men's basketball telecasts on Saturdays, until the station lost the rights to those games when the conference launched the Big Ten Network in August 2007. From 2007 to 2013, WTTV aired basketball games from the "old" Big East Conference, presumably due to the Notre Dame Fighting Irish's large following in the area. WTTV regained some rights to Big Ten basketball upon its switch to CBS.

WTTV also previously served as the flagship station for Indianapolis Colts NFL preseason games in the past until 2011, when WISH/WNDY took over the rights. WTTV traditionally produced statewide boys' and girls' high school basketball tournament finals and high school football championship games; however, after the Indiana High School Athletic Association converted its basketball tournament from a single-class to a multi-class format in 1997, WTTV chose not to renew those rights citing a decline in ratings (the broadcasts subsequently moved to WNDY-TV (channel 23) and then to WHMB-TV (channel 40)); a new agreement with the IHSAA returned these events to WTTV in the fall of 2010. The IHSAA moved the tournaments to Fox Sports Indiana (now FanDuel Sports Network Indiana) in the 2013–14 season.

WTTV also served as the television flagship for the Indiana Pacers from the team's days in the original American Basketball Association (except in 1984–85, when those rights were held by present-day sister station WXIN due to Pacers owner Melvin Simon's part-ownership of the station) to 2006. WTTV lost the rights to the Pacers telecasts after the 2005–06 season, when the NBA team moved their local game telecasts to Fox Sports Indiana.

In August 2008, WTTV debuted Hoosier High School Sports Overtime, a weekly half-hour program devoted to Indiana high school athletics that airs Sunday mornings at 11:30 a.m.; it is hosted by WXIN sports anchor Jeremiah Johnson. In November of that year, the station also began running Hoosier High School Sports Classics, a two-hour program that features rebroadcasts of past Indiana high school football and basketball state championship games, interspersed with present-day interviews of coaches and athletes that were involved; it aired on Sundays from 9:30 to 11:30 a.m.

With the switch to CBS, WTTV became the de facto home station of the Colts, due to CBS' contract to carry a schedule mainly made up of American Football Conference games and Thursday Night Football, and a deal between Tribune Broadcasting and the team making the station and WXIN exclusive broadcast partners. This means both stations air Colts preseason games, team programming and coach's shows; advertising within Lucas Oil Stadium is also included in the deal. Additionally, both stations carried the Super Bowl from 2019 to 2021, with WTTV carrying CBS coverage of Super Bowl LIII, WXIN airing Fox's coverage of Super Bowl LIV and CBS airing Super Bowl LV. (CBS and NBC switched Super Bowl coverage in 2021 and 2022; this was so that NBC would not have to worry about airing the Winter Olympics (which begin nine days before Super Bowl LVI) against CBS' coverage of the Super Bowl. Thus, CBS aired Super Bowl LV in 2021 and NBC aired Super Bowl LVI in 2022. Between CBS' AFC rights and Fox's NFC rights, the only time the Colts would not play on a Tribune station would be if they were scheduled for an NBC Sunday Night Football telecast, which would air on WTHR, or ESPN's Monday Night Football, which has traditionally aired on WRTV. The first Colts game to air on WTTV as a CBS affiliate was the team's first-round playoff victory over the Cincinnati Bengals on January 4, and it carried two more games in the 2014 NFL season before the Colts lost to the Patriots in the AFC Championship on January 18, 2015. Beginning in 2018, the Thursday Night Football games were aired on WXIN, due to Fox carrying the package as part of a contract lasting through 2021 (Thursday Night Football is now exclusively on Amazon Prime Video starting with the 2022 season).

WTTV, through CBS, also owns the local rights to the NCAA Division I men's basketball tournament every other year (years TNT Sports does not carry the tournament's semi-finals and final), which has traditionally ranked among the highest-rated programs in the market during tournament season due to Indiana's traditional status as a college basketball hotbed and as the home base for the NCAA. WTTV served as the local broadcaster for the 2021 Final Four, including the championship game. As previously stated, the station also carries Big Ten games picked up by CBS, including the men's basketball championship game, which is held every other year at Gainbridge Fieldhouse, and, since 2024, the football championship game at Lucas Oil Stadium, which is televised on CBS every four years.

By coincidence, in addition to trading the CW to WISH-TV, Tribune Media has also taken a large role in programming that station since the switch of CBS to WTTV, along with sister station WNDY, via rights deals for the two stations to carry professional Chicago sports over those two stations which are broadcast by WGN-TV in Chicago, including baseball's Cubs and White Sox and Blackhawks hockey to replace WGN America's former carriage of those sports in the area, as Indianapolis is claimed as Chicago team territory by Major League Baseball and the National Hockey League.

Since 2018, WTTV serves as a host station for Australia's 10 Sport during Indianapolis 500 coverage due to Paramount Global's ownership of Network 10.

In 2025, WTTV announced an agreement with Minor League Baseball's Indianapolis Indians to make WTTV-DT2 the team's local broadcast home.

=== Newscasts ===
WTTV presently broadcasts 25 1/2 hours of locally produced newscasts each week (with 4 1/2 hours each weekday, one hour on Saturdays and 1 1/2 hours on Sundays which includes IN Focus airing at 8:30 a.m.); in addition, WTTV airs Colts 365 on Saturdays at 11:30 p.m. Unlike most CBS affiliates and most Nexstar-owned stations that maintain news operations (including in-market sister station WXIN), WTTV does not air any local newscasts on weekend mornings. Combined with WXIN, however, the Nexstar Indianapolis stations broadcast a combined 88 hours of local news programing.

In 1950, WTTV began operating an in-house news department; after losing its ABC affiliation in 1957, it became one of the few independent stations outside of the ten largest television markets that had a functioning news department. In 1979, the station began airing the first prime time newscast in the Indianapolis market, when it moved its nightly evening news program to 10 p.m. (predating WXIN's first and shorter-lived prime time news effort by five years). Capitol Broadcasting abruptly shut down WTTV's news department on November 1, 1990, due to financial problems, with the last 10 newscast airing the night before on October 31; 34 staffers were laid off as a result.

The station replaced the newscast in the 10 p.m. slot with syndicated programming for the next few months, before it entered into a news share agreement with ABC affiliate WRTV in April 1991 to produce a half-hour 10 p.m. newscast—titled WRTV 6 News at Ten and later 6 News at Ten—which debuted that fall. After Tribune bought the station, WTTV terminated the news share agreement with WRTV, so as to not compete with new sister station WXIN's longer-established 10 p.m. newscast; the WRTV-produced newscast was discontinued on December 31, 2002, with channel 4 filling the 10 p.m. slot with syndicated programming thereafter.

Upon becoming a sister station to WXIN, WTTV began carrying that station's prime time newscast during instances where Fox's MLB playoff game telecasts run into the 10 p.m. timeslot (not using a News at Ten logo on-air in place of the Fox 59 News branding, unlike what Hartford sister station WCCT-TV does during broadcasts of sister station WTIC-TV's newscasts). On January 2, 2008, the station began simulcasting the 6–9 a.m. block of WXIN's weekday morning newscast; the 5 a.m. hour of the program began to be simulcast on WTTV on March 31, 2008. The simulcast was briefly discontinued on September 18, 2009, before returning the following month on October 12; the simulcast—by then, running only from 4:30 to 6 a.m.—was moved to WTTV/WTTK's This TV-affiliated second digital subchannel on September 13, 2010, later expanding to include the full six-hour broadcast from 4 to 10 a.m. along with the three-hour weekend morning newscast; the simulcast was discontinued again in September 2013. The only locally produced programming on WTTV/WTTK that was close to a news product after the simulcast moved from the stations' main channel was the business showcase Indy's MarketPlace (or Indiana's Market), which aired weekdays at 8 and 11:30 a.m.; the program ended on September 10, 2010.

Other than simulcasts and default carriage of WXIN's newscasts due to Fox Sports programming delays, WTTV did not carry traditional local newscasts produced specifically for itself from the 2002 cancellation of the WRTV-produced newscast to its switch to CBS; it was one of only five Tribune-owned stations that did not carry daily newscasts (alongside WNOL-TV in New Orleans, WCCT-TV in Hartford–New Haven, WDCW in Washington, D.C., and WSFL-TV in Miami) of any kind.

However, with the announcement of the CBS affiliation's move to WTTV, the station announced plans to launch newscasts separate from those on WXIN with its own on-air staff (similar to, though also differing in structure from the shared news operation of St. Louis sister duopoly KTVI/KPLR-TV, the latter of which maintained separate anchors from KTVI for certain newscasts), which was housed out of the two stations' shared facility on Network Place. This made WXIN/WTTV the first known duopoly (legal or virtual) involving a Big Three affiliate and a Fox station, in which the two stations maintained separated news departments and newscasts in competing timeslots (the presence of two separate, but jointly based news departments controlled by one company structured in this manner is more common with duopolies involving stations affiliated with two of the Big Three networks). There is a considerable amount of sharing between WTTV and WXIN in regards to news coverage, video footage and the use of reporters; though both outlets maintain their own primary on-air personalities (such as news anchors and meteorologists) that only appear on their respective station.

In December 2014, WTTV announced the hirings of its weekday morning, noon and evening anchor teams, which include weeknight anchors Debby Knox (who had previously retired from WISH in 2013) and Bob Donaldson (who also continued to serve in his longtime role as anchor of WXIN's 10 p.m. newscast, before relegating his anchor duties exclusively to WTTV until January 2016), morning anchors Marianne Lyles (formerly of WISN-TV in Milwaukee) and Tim Doty (formerly of Grand Rapids sister station WXMI), and meteorologists Chris Wright (formerly of WISH, WTHR and WXIN) and Lindsay Riley (formerly of KXAS-TV in Dallas–Fort Worth). The newscasts launched with WTTV's CBS affiliation on January 1, 2015; while it does hinder both stations, WTTV and WXIN each produce newscasts that run concurrently in most traditional timeslots, except on weekend mornings (as WTTV carries the CBS Dream Team lineup), weekdays at noon and weekends at 6 p.m. (as WXIN airs syndicated programming in both periods, with sports programming periodically airing in the latter slot on either station). Since relaunching its news department, WTTV has waged a spirited battle for second place (behind long-dominant WTHR) in the local news ratings against WRTV, WISH-TV and sister station WXIN.

==== Notable former on-air staff ====
- Frank Edwards – host of Stranger Than Science, a locally produced program on UFOs and the paranormal from 1955 to 1959 and 1961 to 1962
- Barbara Stock – host of the talk show Mid-Morning

=== Other locally produced programming ===
From the 1960s to the early 1980s, WTTV was known in Central Indiana for its local programming, including children's shows Janie (previously titled Popeye and Janie) and Cowboy Bob's Corral (previously titled Chuckwagon Theatre, both starring Bob Glaze in the role of Cowboy Bob). Late night horror movies during this timeframe were presented by Sammy Terry, a ghoulish vampire character portrayed by Bob Carter. The station frequently ran local advertising including from Dave Mason Buick, featuring the catchphrase "Old Dave needs the money"; Mason was often shown in the stands during coverage of the Marion County fair. In the late 1980s, the station produced a film noir-styled mystery show titled Hide & Sneak, which was related to a scratch-off game distributed at local supermarkets. Solving the mystery presented in one of the skits led to prizes. Each episode aired only once, however, because of its time-sensitive nature.

In 1989, WTTV obtained the local rights to the Hoosier Lottery's daily drawings and its companion game show, Hoosier Millionaire; the station lost the lottery rights to WNDY-TV in September 1995; WTTV regained the rights to the lottery in 1999, partnering with WRTV in the production of the Hoosier Lottery's daily drawings to fulfill requirements of channel 4's contract with the lottery commission, which required the evening drawings to air during local newscasts.

In August 2008, Clear Channel-owned radio station WFBQ (94.7 FM) formed a partnership with the Tribune Company to produce a television broadcast of the nationally syndicated radio program The Bob & Tom Show (hosted by Bob Kevoian and Tom Griswold); the pre-recorded hour-long program—featuring highlights taken from that day's radio broadcast—aired on WTTV and co-owned Chicago-based cable superstation WGN America, in an effort by Tribune to bring back programming distributed by the company on its stations. The program debuted on November 3, 2008; WGN America dropped the program on September 10, 2010.

== Technical information ==
=== WTTV subchannels ===
WTTV's signal is multiplexed:

Subchannels of WTTV
Subchannel	Res.	Short name	Programming
4.1	1080i	WTTV-DT	CBS
4.2	480i	WTTV4.2	Independent
4.3	480i	CometTV	Comet
4.4	480i	ROAR	Roar
4.5	480i	Rewind	Rewind TV

=== WTTK subchannels ===
WTTK's ATSC 1.0 channels are carried on the multiplexed signals of other Indianapolis television stations:

Subchannels provided by WTTK (ATSC 1.0)
Subchannel	Res.	Short name	Programming	ATSC 1.0 host
29.1	1080i	WTTK-DT	CBS	WXIN
29.2	480i	WTTV4.2	Independent	WRTV
29.3	480i	COZI	Cozi TV	WRTV

==== ATSC 3.0 lighthouse ====
Subchannels of WTTK (ATSC 3.0)
Subchannel	Res.	Short name	Programming
6.1	720p	WRTV HD	ABC (WRTV)
13.1	1080i	WTHR HD	NBC (WTHR)
29.1	1080i	WTTK HD	CBS
59.1	720p	WXIN HD	Fox (WXIN)

Subchannel broadcast with digital rights management

=== Analog-to-digital conversion ===
On June 12, 2009, the official date on which full-power television stations in the United States transitioned from analog to digital broadcasts under federal mandate, the following changes occurred on WTTV and WTTK:

- As part of the SAFER Act, WTTV kept its analog signal, over VHF channel 4, on the air until June 26 to inform viewers of the digital television transition through a loop of public service announcements from the National Association of Broadcasters. The station's digital signal continued to broadcast on its pre-transition UHF channel 48, using virtual channel 4.
- WTTK shut down its analog signal, over UHF channel 29; the station's digital signal relocated from its pre-transition UHF channel 54, which was among the high band UHF channels (52–69) that were removed from broadcasting use as a result of the transition, to its analog-era UHF channel 29 for post-transition operations.

After WXIN shut down its analog signal on June 12, WTTK began broadcasting its signal from a newly installed common antenna atop WXIN's transmitter tower on Westlane Road in northwestern Indianapolis. Prior to the digital transition, WTTK operated its analog transmitter on State Road 213, just south of Windfall; the site remains owned by Nexstar, although the FCC does not have an application on file for use of the transmitter as a backup Digital Auxiliary Service.

== See also ==
- List of tallest structures in the world – 300 to 400 metres
