= WTHI-TV =

Television station in Terre Haute, Indiana

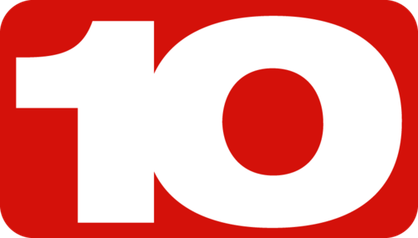

- Terre Haute, Indiana; United States
- Channels: Digital: 10 (VHF); Virtual: 10
- Branding: TV 10; News 10; MyFox10 (10.2); MeTV Terre Haute (10.3)

Programming
- Affiliations: 10.1: CBS; 10.2: Fox/MyNetworkTV; 10.3: MeTV; for others, see § Subchannels

Ownership
- Owner: Gray Media; (Gray Television Licensee, LLC)

History
- First air date: July 22, 1954
- Former channel numbers: Analog: 10 (VHF, 1954–2009); Digital: 24 (UHF, until 2009)
- Former affiliations: DuMont (secondary, 1954–1955); NBC (secondary, 1954–1965); ABC (secondary, 1954–1973); UPN (secondary, 1995–2006); CW+ (10.3, 2017–2024)
- Call sign meaning: Theatre Hulman, Inc.; -or-; Terre Haute, Indiana

Technical information
- Licensing authority: FCC
- Facility ID: 70655
- ERP: 27 kW
- HAAT: 293 m (961 ft)
- Transmitter coordinates: 39°14′36″N 87°23′7″W

Links
- Public license information: Public file; LMS
- Website: www.wthitv.com

WTHI-TV (channel 10) is a television station in Terre Haute, Indiana, United States, affiliated with CBS, Fox, MyNetworkTV and MeTV. Owned by Gray Media, the station has studios on 8th and Ohio Streets in downtown Terre Haute, and its transmitter is located along US 41/150 in unincorporated Sullivan County (south of Farmersburg).

== History ==
WTHI-TV first signed on the air on July 22, 1954. It was the first television station in the Terre Haute market. It was founded by local businessman and Indianapolis Motor Speedway owner Tony Hulman, owner of radio stations WTHI (1480 AM, now WPFR), and WTHI-FM (99.9). Channel 10 has been a CBS affiliate since its sign-on; however, it initially carried programming from NBC, ABC and the DuMont Television Network as well through secondary affiliations. WTHI-TV originally operated from a studio facility at 918 Ohio Street (at the intersection of South 9th 1/2 and Ohio streets) in downtown Terre Haute, which also became occupied by WTHI-FM upon the television station's sign-on (the building was originally constructed in 1906 to house a garment factory).

WTHI lost the DuMont affiliation when the network ceased operations in August 1956; NBC programming moved to the city's second television station, WTWO (channel 2), when it signed on the air in September 1965. The station exclusively aligned with CBS when the ABC affiliation moved to WIIL-TV (channel 38, now WAWV-TV), when it signed on in April 1973. Local programs airing on the station during its earlier history featured Jerry Van Dyke of Coach and My Mother the Car fame, and "Captain Jack" Hanes, whose most famous guest was eventual Boston Celtics legend Larry Bird.

WTHI logo used from 2006 to 2012.

WTHI was a secondary affiliate of UPN when the network launched on January 16, 1995, carrying its programming immediately after CBS late night. Rare for those arrangements with UPN, it continued until the network ended operations and merged with the WB in September 2006 to form The CW, as no full-power or low-power stations came on the air in the market through that time.

The Hulman family continued to own WTHI-TV until 1998, when they sold the station to Emmis Communications. Emmis Communications announced the sale of its 16 television stations on May 15, 2005, in order to concentrate on its radio properties. Emmis sold WTHI-TV to the LIN TV Corporation in August 2005, placing it under common ownership with LIN's three other CBS affiliates in Indiana: WANE-TV in Fort Wayne, WLFI-TV in Lafayette), and at the time, WISH-TV in Indianapolis (the affiliation has since moved to WTTV in January 2015).

In October 2012, the station relocated its operations to a new facility located one block west of its original studios, at 800 Ohio Street in downtown Terre Haute; the original studio building, which was also shared with former sister stations WWVR (105.5 FM) (which, along with WTHI-FM, remains owned by Emmis Communications), was demolished in December 2012 to accommodate parking for a new office building being constructed nearby. The move completely separated WTHI-TV from WTHI-FM, which had moved into the new office building that August.

On March 21, 2014, Media General announced that it would merge with LIN Media in a $1.6 billion deal. The merger was completed on December 19.

Shortly thereafter, after an aborted merger plan with Meredith Corporation, Media General announced on January 27, 2016, that it was being acquired by Nexstar Broadcasting Group with the new company named "Nexstar Media Group". As Nexstar already owns WTWO (and operates Mission Broadcasting-owned WAWV-TV) and since the Terre Haute market is too small to allow duopolies in any case, in order to comply with FCC ownership rules as well as planned changes to rules regarding same-market television stations which would prohibit future joint sales agreements, the company was required to sell either WTWO or WTHI to another company. On March 4, 2016, Nexstar and Mission declared their intentions to keep WTWO/WAWV and sell WTHI to another company; on June 13, 2016, it announced that WTHI and four other stations would be acquired by Heartland Media, through its USA Television MidAmerica Holdings joint venture with MSouth Equity Partners, for $115 million. The deal was consummated upon the approval of Nexstar's merger with Media General on January 17.

On October 1, 2019, Allen Media Broadcasting, a subsidiary of Los Angeles–based Entertainment Studios, owned by Byron Allen, agreed to purchase 11 stations from Heartland, including WTHI-TV, for $290 million. The sale of the Heartland stations was approved by the FCC on November 22, 2019, and it was completed on February 11, 2020.

On June 1, 2025, amid financial woes and rising debt, Allen Media Group announced that it would explore "strategic options" for the company, such as a sale of its television stations (including WTHI). On August 8, 2025, it was announced that AMG would sell 12 of its stations, including WTHI, to Gray Media for $171 million. The sale of WTHI was completed on March 27, 2026, marking Gray's entry into the Terre Haute market.

== Subchannel history ==
=== WTHI-DT2 (Fox & MyNetworkTV) ===
WTHI-DT2, branded on air as MyFox10, is the primary Fox and secondary MyNetworkTV-affiliated second digital subchannel of WTHI-TV, broadcasting in 720p high definition on channel 10.2.

==== Prior history of the Fox affiliation in Terre Haute ====
For the first nine years of the network's existence, Fox did not have an affiliate in Terre Haute as the market consists of only three full-power commercial television stations. Area residents were only able to view the network's programming through either Indianapolis affiliate WXIN (which was carried on certain cable providers in the market and was available over the air in extreme eastern portions of the market) or the now-defunct cable-only service Foxnet (which mainly served the western areas of the market). The market would not receive its own Fox station until January 31, 1995, when WBAK-TV ended its 22-year tenure with ABC—which it had been affiliated with since it signed on as WIIL-TV in April 1973—to join the network. This had the side effect of leaving the Terre Haute area without an over-the-air ABC affiliate, resulting in area cable providers having to pipe in the network's programming through out-of-market stations from Indianapolis (WRTV, which was also available over the air in most areas of the Indiana side of the market until the 2009 digital transition), Springfield, Illinois (WAND until 2005, WICS thereafter) and Evansville (WEHT).

==== WTHI-DT2 history ====
The history of digital subchannel 10.2 began when WTHI-TV created the subchannel to air a 24-hour simulcast of the station's Doppler radar system, "Storm Team 10 Fury Doppler," which was accompanied by an audio simulcast from NOAA Weather Radio station WXK72. On October 25, 2010, the station replaced the radar feed/NOAA audio simulcast with the music video network TheCoolTV as part of an agreement with LIN to carry the network across many of its stations. However, within days of the switch, the station received heavy viewer feedback pillorying the move, suggesting that the radar channel was appreciated; as a result on November 5, 2010, WTHI relaunched the "Fury" radar feed on a new third digital subchannel.

On August 25, 2011, it was announced that WTHI had signed affiliation agreements with Fox and MyNetworkTV, which both began broadcasting on WTHI's second digital subchannel on September 1, 2011; WFXW (now WAWV-TV), which had been the market's original Fox affiliate since it switched to the network from ABC in January 1995, rejoined ABC on that date in concurrence with a dispute between management partner Nexstar Broadcasting Group and Fox as well as an affiliation renewal deal with ABC for the company's other affiliates of that network. WTHI-TV became the third LIN Media station to carry major network affiliations on both the main channel and a digital subchannel (LIN-owned NBC affiliate WOOD-TV in Grand Rapids, Michigan and Fox affiliate WNAC-TV in Providence, Rhode Island, the latter of which was owned by Super Towers, Inc. and operated by LIN, both carry MyNetworkTV on a second digital subchannel).

WTHI-DT2 carries Fox prime time programming from 8 to 10 p.m. Eastern Time (7 to 9 p.m. Central on the Illinois side of the market), while MyNetworkTV programming airs on a three-hour tape delay from 11 p.m. to 1 a.m. Eastern/10 p.m. to midnight Central; WTHI-DT2 became the Terre Haute market's first television outlet for the MyNetworkTV programming service, as it had previously been one of the few markets without a MyNetworkTV affiliate since the service's September 2006 launch. As a result of the dual affiliations, WTHI dropped TheCoolTV (one year before LIN terminated its agreements with the network for its other stations). On the same day that Fox and MyNetworkTV programming began airing on WTHI-DT2, the subchannel debuted a half-hour prime time newscast at 10 p.m. Eastern/9 p.m. Central.

=== WTHI-DT3 (MeTV) and WTHI-DT4 (Ion Television) ===
WTHI-DT3, branded on air as Wabash Valley's CW10, was the original CW+-affiliated third digital subchannel of WTHI-TV, broadcasting in 720p high definition on channel 10.3. The network was replaced by MeTV on September 1, 2024.

WTHI-DT4 is the Ion Television-affiliated fourth digital subchannel of WTHI-TV, broadcasting in 16:9 widescreen standard definition on channel 10.4.

On November 5, 2010, WTHI relaunched the "Fury" radar feed on a new third digital subchannel. To preserve bandwidth for the "MyFox10" subchannel on 10.2, the live feed of "Storm Team 10 Fury Radar" was removed for the second time on August 31, 2011.

On December 1, 2015, WTHI relaunched its tertiary subchannel on digital channel 10.3 as an affiliate of Ion Television.

On September 6, 2017, WTHI-DT3 switched to a 720p HD feed of The CW's national CW+ service, succeeding cable-only "WBI" as the CW+ affiliate for the Terre Haute market; on that date, Ion Television was moved to a newly created subchannel on 10.4.

On September 1, 2024, due to CW+ moving to WTWO, MeTV became the third subchannel of WTHI. A fifth subchannel for MeTV Toons was added on October 1, 2024.

== News operation ==
WTHI-TV presently broadcasts 19 1/2 hours of locally produced newscasts each week (with 3 1/2 hours each weekday, and one hour each on Saturdays and Sundays); unlike most CBS affiliates in the Eastern Time Zone, the station's early evening newscast at 5 p.m. runs only for a half-hour, with the station opting to fill the 5:30 p.m. half-hour with syndicated programs (currently, the syndicated newsmagazine Inside Edition). In addition to its main studios, the station operated a Southern Bureau located at the studios of PBS member station WVUT (channel 22) on North 2nd Street and Rosedale Avenue in Vincennes until early 2024, when it was eliminated as part of budget cuts.

Local news programming has been a presence on WTHI since the station's inception. The newscasts were branded during the late 1970s and early 1980s as NewsCenter 10. The title was changed to Action 10 News in 1985, and modified to Action 10 News WTHI in 2001. On September 18, 2006, the branding was changed to News 10, concurrent with the introduction of a new logo and graphics package.

WTHI-TV did not air an early evening newscast at 5 p.m. until September 12, 2011, when WTHI debuted a half-hour newscast in the timeslot—replacing the daytime talk show Dr. Phil (which itself moved to NBC affiliate WTWO, after that station moved its hour-long 5 p.m. newscast to sister station WAWV-TV, after the former Fox affiliate switched to ABC on September 1). Coinciding with the move to its new facility on Ohio Street on October 20, 2012, beginning with that night's 11 p.m. newscast, WTHI became the first commercial television station in the Terre Haute market to begin broadcasting its local newscasts in high definition. Beginning June 24, 2017, WTHI-TV added the area's first local weekend morning newscast at 8 a.m. The newscast airs on both Saturday and Sunday before the CBS News broadcasts.

On January 17, 2025, Allen Media Group announced plans to cut local meteorologist/weather forecaster positions from its stations, including WTHI, and replacing them with a "weather hub" produced by The Weather Channel, which AMG also owns. The cuts also restructured several news departments, including at WTHI, where anchor Patrece Dayton and meteorologist Kevin Orpurt were dismissed after long on-air tenures exceeding 35 years each. In addition, portions of WTHI's news output were hubbed from Allen-owned WLFI-TV in Lafayette. Following the acquisition of WTHI by Gray, the company reinstated Orpurt as chief meteorologist in May 2026.

=== WTHI-DT2 ===
WTHI-TV presently produces 3 1/2 hours of locally produced newscasts each week for WTHI-DT2 (with a half-hour each on weekdays, Saturdays and Sundays).

Concurrent with the move of Fox and MyNetworkTV programming to WTHI-DT2 on September 1, 2011, WTHI-TV began producing a half-hour prime time newscast for the subchannel, titled News 10 on Fox, airing Monday through Friday evenings at 10 p.m. (9 p.m. Central on the Illinois side of the market). The newscast later expanded to include Saturday and Sunday evening editions on August 11, 2012. In August 2017, News 10 at 7pm was canceled after two years. The newscast provided a late evening offering.

=== Notable former on-air staff ===
- David Goodnow – anchor/reporter
- Mike King – sports anchor
- Liam McHugh – sports anchor/reporter
- Mary Jo Mitchell – reporter
- Jerry Van Dyke – talk show host
- Bill Weber – sports commentator

== Technical information ==
=== Subchannels ===
The station's signal is multiplexed:

Subchannels of WTHI-TV
Subchannel	Res.	Short name	Programming
10.1	1080i	WTHITV	CBS
10.2	720p	MyFOX10	Fox & MyNetworkTV
10.3	480i	MeTV	MeTV
10.4	480i	ION	Ion
10.5	480i	MeTOONS	MeTV Toons

=== Analog-to-digital conversion ===
WTHI-TV ended regular programming on its analog signal, over VHF channel 10, on June 12, 2009, the official date on which full-power television stations in the United States transitioned from analog to digital broadcasts under federal mandate. The station's digital signal relocated from its pre-transition UHF channel 24 to VHF channel 10 for post-transition operations.
