= Avon, Indiana =

- Town
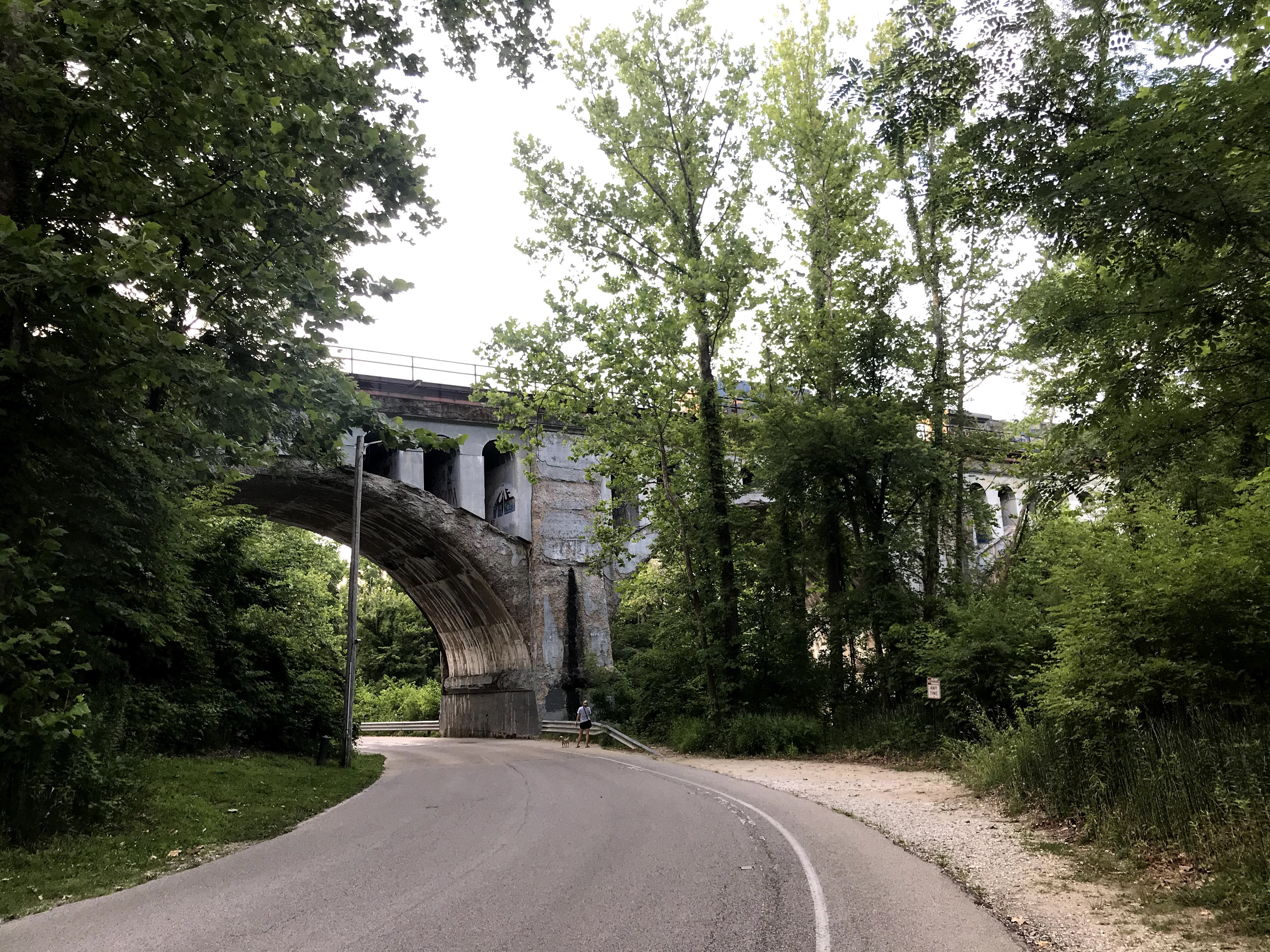
- Avon Haunted Bridge

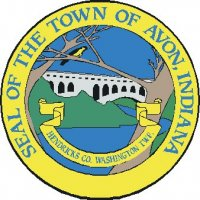
- Flag Seal Logo

- Location of Avon in Hendricks County, Indiana.

- Location in Indiana Avon (the United States) Avon (North America)
- Coordinates: 39°45′35″N 86°23′36″W
- Country: United States
- State: Indiana
- County: Hendricks
- Townships: Washington, Lincoln
- Founded: c. 1830
- Incorporated: 1995

Government
  - Town Manager: Lauryn Miller

Area
  - Total: 19.41 sq mi (50.26 km^{2})
  - Land: 19.25 sq mi (49.87 km^{2})
  - Water: 0.15 sq mi (0.39 km^{2})
- Elevation: 837 ft (255 m)

Population (2020)
  - Total: 21,474
  - Density: 1,115.2/sq mi (430.59/km^{2})
- Time zone: UTC-5 (EST)
  - Summer (DST): UTC-4 (EDT)
- ZIP code: 46123
- Area code: 317
- FIPS code: 18-02908
- GNIS ID: 2396582
- Website: www.avonindiana.gov

Avon is a town in Washington and Lincoln Townships, Hendricks County, Indiana, United States. The population was 21,474 at the 2020 census. It is part of the Indianapolis metropolitan area. Avon is a suburb of Indianapolis.

== History ==
The first settlement at Avon was made around 1830. The first post office at Avon opened as "Smootsdell", in 1868. It was renamed "Avon" in 1870, and remained in operation until it was discontinued in 1902. The present name comes from the River Avon in England.

Avon was officially incorporated as a town in 1995.

== Geography ==
Avon is located in eastern Hendricks County and is bordered to the north by Brownsburg, to the west by Danville, the Hendricks County seat, to the south by Plainfield, and to the east by the city of Indianapolis in Marion County.

U.S. Route 36 is the main east–west road through the town, leading east 13 miles (21 km) to downtown Indianapolis and west 7 miles (11 km) to the center of Danville. Indiana State Road 267 formerly crossed US-36 in the center of Avon, leading north 5 miles (8 km) to Brownsburg and south 4 miles (6 km) to Plainfield, but that stretch of 267 was decommissioned in 2013, and the section through Avon is now officially called Avon Avenue.

According to the 2010 census, Avon has a total area of 14.34 square miles (37.14 km^{2}), of which 14.24 square miles (36.88 km^{2}) (or 99.3%) is land and 0.1 square miles (0.26 km^{2}) (or 0.7%) is water. Avon is 4 miles (6.4 km) north to south.

== Demographics ==
Historical population
Census	Pop.	Note	%±
2000	6,248		—
2010	12,446		99.2%
2020	21,474		72.5%
U.S. Decennial Census

=== 2020 census ===
As of the 2020 census, Avon had a population of 21,474. The median age was 37.4 years. 26.2% of residents were under the age of 18 and 14.2% of residents were 65 years of age or older. For every 100 females there were 92.7 males, and for every 100 females age 18 and over there were 88.9 males age 18 and over.

98.7% of residents lived in urban areas, while 1.3% lived in rural areas.

There were 7,781 households in Avon, of which 38.0% had children under the age of 18 living in them. Of all households, 58.4% were married-couple households, 13.8% were households with a male householder and no spouse or partner present, and 22.5% were households with a female householder and no spouse or partner present. About 22.4% of all households were made up of individuals and 8.5% had someone living alone who was 65 years of age or older.

There were 8,231 housing units, of which 5.5% were vacant. The homeowner vacancy rate was 1.1% and the rental vacancy rate was 10.7%.

Racial composition as of the 2020 census
Race	Number	Percent
White	15,194	70.8%
Black or African American	2,688	12.5%
American Indian and Alaska Native	58	0.3%
Asian	1,534	7.1%
Native Hawaiian and Other Pacific Islander	12	0.1%
Some other race	519	2.4%
Two or more races	1,469	6.8%
Hispanic or Latino (of any race)	1,191	5.5%

=== 2010 census ===
As of the 2010 census, there were 12,446 people, 4,457 households, and 3,384 families living in the town. The population density was 874.0 inhabitants per square mile (337.5/km^{2}). There were 4,742 housing units at an average density of 333.0 per square mile (128.6/km^{2}). The racial makeup of the town was 86.7% White, 5.9% Black, 0.3% Native American, 3.3% Asian, 0.1% Pacific Islander, 1.4% from other races, and 2.2% from two or more races. Hispanic or Latino of any race were 4.3% of the population.

There were 4,457 households, of which 45.6% had children under the age of 18 living with them, 62.5% were married couples living together, 9.3% had a female householder with no husband present, 4.1% had a male householder with no wife present, and 24.1% were non-families. 19.4% of all households were made up of individuals, and 5.8% had someone living alone who was 65 years of age or older. The average household size was 2.77 and the average family size was 3.20.

The median age in the town was 33.9 years. 30.2% of residents were under the age of 18; 6.6% were between the ages of 18 and 24; 31.7% were from 25 to 44; 23.6% were from 45 to 64; and 8% were 65 years of age or older. The gender makeup of the town was 48.3% male and 51.7% female.

=== 2000 census ===
As of the 2000 census, there were 6,248 people, 2,127 households, and 1,786 families living in the town. The population density was 976.2 inhabitants per square mile (376.9/km^{2}). There were 2,240 housing units at an average density of 351.1 per square mile (135.6/km^{2}). The racial makeup of the town was 95.87% White, 0.58% Black, 0.26% Native American, 1.41% Asian, 0.06% Pacific Islander, 0.72% from other races, and 1.10% from two or more races. Hispanic or Latino of any race were 1.36% of the population.

There were 2,127 households, out of which 51.4% had children under the age of 18 living with them, 75.4% were married couples living together, 5.6% had a female householder with no husband present, and 16.0% were non-families. 12.6% of all households were made up of individuals, and 3.6% had someone living alone who was 65 years of age or older. The average household size was 2.94 and the average family size was 3.22.

In the town, the population was spread out, with 33.2% under the age of 18, 4.8% from 18 to 24, 39.3% from 25 to 44, 18.1% from 45 to 64, and 4.5% who were 65 years of age or older. The median age was 32 years. For every 100 females, there were 101.7 males. For every 100 females age 18 and over, there were 99.0 males.

The median income for a household in the town was $66,782, and the median income for a family was $68,205. Males had a median income of $48,542 versus $31,010 for females. The per capita income for the town was $24,740. About 2.7% of families and 2.9% of the population were below the poverty line, including 2.9% of those under age 18 and 15.8% of those age 65 or over.

== Education ==
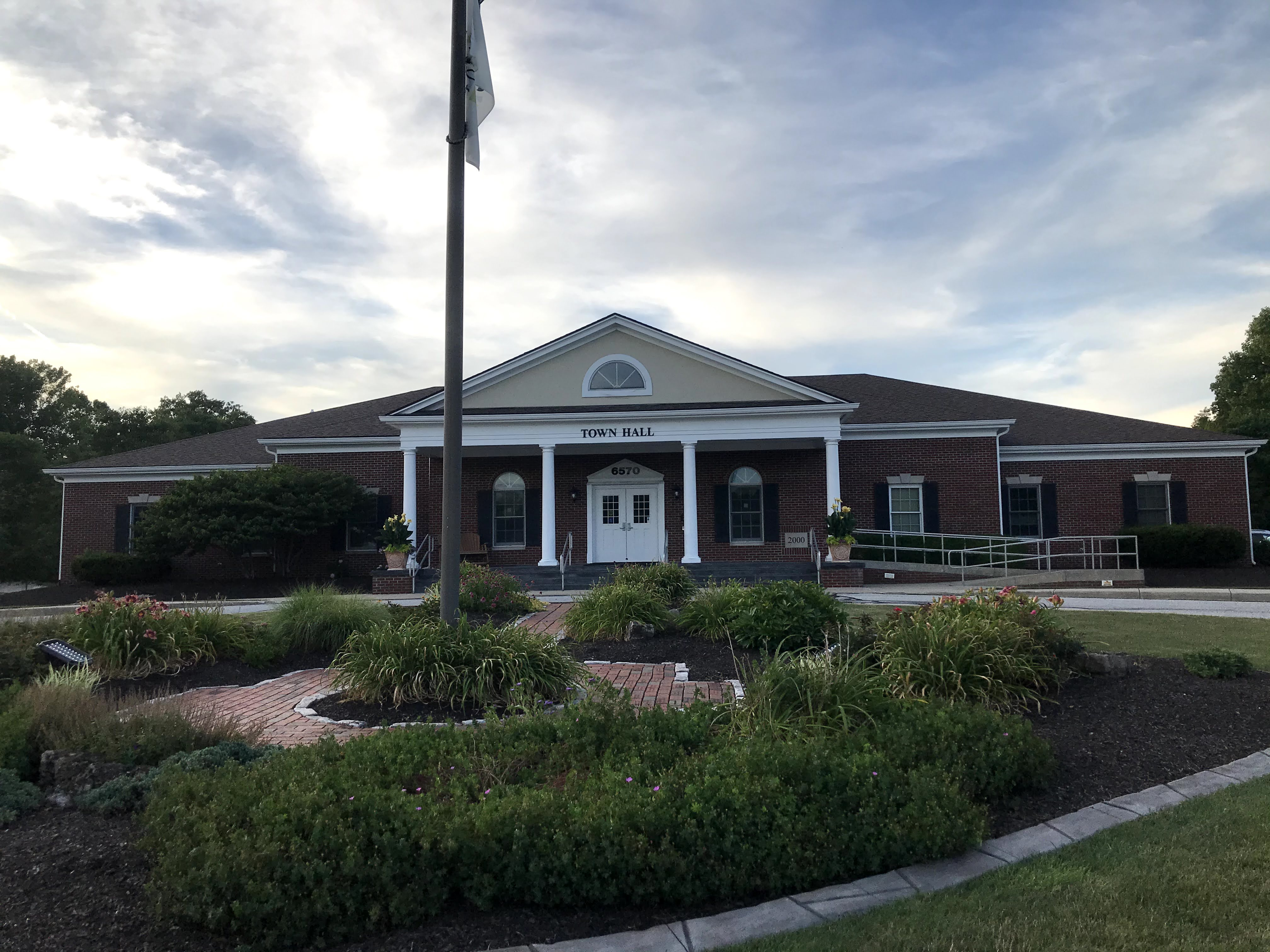
Avon Town Hall

=== Public schools ===
The vast majority of Avon is in the Avon Community School Corporation. The mascot is the Avon Oriole.

Schools in the system include:

- High Schools (grades 9–12)
  - Avon High School
  - Harris Academy (shared with the Brownsburg Community School Corporation)
- Middle Schools (grades 6–8)
  - Avon Middle School – North
  - Avon Middle School – South
  - Avon Middle School - West
- Elementary Schools (grades K–5)
  - Cedar Elementary School
  - Evergreen Elementary School
  - Hickory Elementary School
  - Maple Elementary School
  - Pine Tree Elementary School
  - River Birch Elementary School
  - Sycamore Elementary School
  - Willow Elementary School
- Pre-schools
  - White Oak Early Learning Center

Small parts of Avon extend into Brownsburg Community School Corporation. That district operates Brownsburg High School.

==== Marching band ====
The Avon High School marching band is well known throughout the country. The Avon Marching Black and Gold, led by Jay Webb, Matt Harloff, Daniel Wiles, Karl Hartman, and Robert Burns, was ranked number one in the state of Indiana by the Indiana State School Music Association (ISSMA) seven years in a row (two times in Class B, five times in Class A). The winning streak ended during the ISSMA state championship on November 1, 2008, when they placed second. They again placed first in Class A on October 31, 2009, and on October 30, 2010, marking their ninth state championship in only ten years. On November 15, 2008, they were ranked as the best high school marching band in the country, placing first during Bands of America Grand Nationals for the first time in the school's history. The longest consecutive and uninterrupted national championship streak is four years (2023, 2024, 2025, 2026), making them the first and only school to win Grand National Championships four times in a row. In 2011, they placed 2nd.

=== Private schools ===
- Kingsway Christian School (grades K–8)
- Our Shepherd Lutheran School (grades PK–8)

=== Public library ===
Avon has a lending library, the Avon-Washington Township Public Library.

== Notable people ==
- Larry Dixon, 3-time NHRA Top Fuel Champion
- Jay Drake, former race car driver
- Chet Fillip, race car driver
- Sergio Gomez, singer
- Andrew Hines, 5-time NHRA Pro Stock Motorcycle Champion
- William T. Hornaday, zoologist, savior of the bison
- Brandon Peters, former college quarterback
- Leah Pritchett, NHRA Top Fuel driver
- Patrick Rodgers, professional golfer
- Jim Sorgi, Indianapolis Colts and New York Giants NFL quarterback
- Steve Talley, actor
- Miranda Throckmorton, sprint car driver
- Al Unser Jr., former race car driver, two-time Indianapolis 500 winner
- Bill Vukovich Jr., former race car driver
