= Brownsburg Fire Territory =

Firefighting area in Indiana, US

Agency overview
- Established: 1923
- Employees: 75 firefighters, medics, and staff
- Staffing: Career
- Fire chief: Larry Alcorn
- EMS level: ALS
- Motto: Vigilantly Serving the Town of Brownsburg, Brown Township, & Lincoln Township Since 1923

Facilities and equipment
- Stations: 3
- Engines: 4
- Trucks: 2
- Ambulances: 4

Founded in 1923 the Brownsburg Fire Territory (BFT) is a Fire Territory located in the central Indiana town of Brownsburg. The original volunteer fire department, formed in 1942, served the town of Brownsburg and not rural communities. In 1945 the volunteer department began providing limited services to rural communities. In 1995 the department, along with state legislators, formed Indiana's first Fire Protection Territory. The newly formed territory now provided full fire protection for Brown and Lincoln Townships. With complete coverage, rural residents received shorter response times because of newly built stations in the townships.

== History ==
Timeline of the history of the Brownsburg Fire Territory

- 1923 Volunteer Fire Department in Brownsburg formed
- 1942 The Brownsburg Volunteer Fire Department (BVFD) is formed and elects officers.
- 1945 On May 6 Brownsburg passes an ordinance to provide fire protection service to Brown and Lincoln townships.
- 1946 First official fire station built.
- 1959 BVFD becomes Brownsburg Fire Department (BFD); first rescue squad put into service on November 10
- 1965 First ambulance bought on September 25
- 1974 First EMT class formed
- 1976 The 911 system went on-line in September
- 1979 BFD's first full-time chief starts on January 1
- 1988 First full-time firefighters hired
- 1991 BFD switched to 24-hour shifts with 3 firefighters with one also being a paramedic on each shift
- 1995 BFD becomes Brownsburg Fire Territory (BFT); Station 132 built in Brown Township
- 2004 BFT Headquarters and Training Facility opens in April
- 2007 Station 133 opens in March
- 2019 The Brownsburg Fire Territory achieved an ISO 1 rating, becoming only the 3rd department in the State of Indiana to receive this rating.

== Equipment ==
As of 2010 BFT has

- 4 fire engines
- 1 Ladder truck
- 1 heavy rescue truck
- 1 grass fire truck
- 4 ambulances
- 1 Battalion chief vehicle
  - note that 1 fire engine and ambulance are reserves, but are used frequently
