= Mark Patrick =

Sports radio personality (born c. 1959)

- Born: Mark Patrick Storen
- Occupation: Sports radio personality
- Years active: 1980–present
- Website: MarkPatrick.com

Mark Patrick Storen (born c. 1959), better known by his professional name Mark Patrick, is an American radio personality based in Indianapolis. Starting out on satellite radio, he was part of MLB Network Radio as the co-host of Baseball This Morning along with Buck Martinez and Larry Bowa . Patrick also hosted the Hoosier Lottery television game show Hoosier Millionaire for 14 years. Patrick also had a nationally syndicated morning show on Fox Sports Radio for a few years. Patrick was primary sports anchor for WISH-TV from 1990 to 1998.

Patrick also provided a number of voice characterizations on The Bob and Tom Show for many years beginning in the late '80s. His characters included a fictional traffic reporter named "T.C." and impressions of Howard Cosell, Harry Caray, Keith Jackson, and Marge Schott. The Harry Caray character had a recurring skit called "After Hours Sports with Harry Caray" where "Harry" would interview various celebrities. After the real Harry Caray died in 1998, the skit was renamed "After Life Sports with Harry Caray" so that Patrick could continue his comic impression as the ghost of Harry Caray.

== Development ==
Patrick was the President of the Kennesaw Development Corporation. In 2000, the Kennesaw Development Corporation filed plans for the Kennesaw development, a 28-lot luxury estate home community featuring 1-3 acre home sites on the northside of Brownsburg, Indiana. In 2001, ground was broken on the roughly 60-acre site of land.

Patrick finished constructing his own home in Kennesaw the following year in 2002. When he later listed his house on the market in 2014, it was featured in an IndyStar article, titled "Hot Property: Mark Patrick's $1.2M home is sports haven". The home features an indoor basketball court, batting cages, and an indoor pitching lane.

== Personal life ==
Patrick graduated from Brownsburg High School in 1977, and then attended Ball State University. Patrick married Pam Nelson and they have two children; son Drew Storen is a former Major League Baseball pitcher.
