= Arthur Graham (disambiguation) =

Arthur Graham (born 1952) is a Scottish footballer.

Arthur Graham may also refer to:

- Skinny Graham (outfielder) (Arthur William Graham, 1909–1967), outfielder for the Boston Red Sox
- Art Graham (born 1941), former American football wide receiver
- Arthur W Graham III (1940–2008), timekeeper for the Indianapolis 500
- Master Arthur Huntingdon, known as Arthur Graham, see The Tenant of Wildfell Hall#Characters

== See also ==
- Graham Arthur (1936–2021), Australian rules footballer
