= WXIN =

Television station in Indianapolis

- Indianapolis, Indiana; United States
- Channels: Digital: 22 (UHF); Virtual: 59
- Branding: Fox59

Programming
- Affiliations: 59.1: Fox; for others, see § Subchannels

Ownership
- Owner: Nexstar Media Group; (Tribune Media Company)
- Sister stations: WTTV/WTTK; Tegna: WTHR, WALV-CD

History
- Founded: July 12, 1983
- First air date: February 1, 1984
- Former call signs: WSMK (CP, 1982–1983); WPDS-TV (1983–1985); WXIN-TV (August 1985)
- Former channel numbers: Analog: 59 (UHF, 1984–2009); Digital: 45 (UHF, 1999–2019)
- Former affiliations: Independent (1984–1986)
- Call sign meaning: Intended as a memory aid to distinguish from other stations, with "IN" for Indiana

Technical information
- Licensing authority: FCC
- Facility ID: 146
- ERP: 1,000 kW
- HAAT: 304 m (997 ft)
- Transmitter coordinates: 39°53′20″N 86°12′7″W

Links
- Public license information: Public file; LMS
- Website: fox59.com

WXIN (channel 59) is a television station in Indianapolis, Indiana, United States, affiliated with the Fox network. It is owned by Nexstar Media Group alongside CBS affiliates WTTV/WTTK (channels 4 and 29); Nexstar's Tegna subsidiary owns NBC affiliate WTHR (channel 13) and low-power, Class A MeTV affiliate WALV-CD (channel 46). WXIN and WTTV share studios on Network Place (near 71st Street and I-465) in northwestern Indianapolis; WXIN's transmitter is located on West 73rd Street (or Westlane Road) on the northern outskirts of the city.

Channel 59 debuted as independent station WPDS-TV on February 1, 1984, broadcasting from studios on Meridian Street. Majority-owned by Anacomp, Inc., it was named for its founding owners: Ron Palamara, Chris Duffy, and Melvin and Herbert Simon. The station dabbled in production of local programs including a newscast, a late-night talk show, and a children's program. Within a year, the partners sold the station to Outlet Communications, which changed the call sign to WXIN in 1985 to reduce confusion with PBS and WTBS. An aggressive program purchasing policy and the financial troubles of WTTV, its chief competitor, made the station more competitive in the market, and the station joined Fox at its creation in 1986.

After more than two years on the market and an abortive sale to locally based Emmis Communications, Chase Broadcasting purchased WXIN in 1990. The station began airing a 10 p.m. newscast in 1991, but it was not until Tribune Broadcasting ownership that it grew beyond late news. A morning newscast debuted in 1999, and from 2004 to 2014, the station tripled its weekly news output with new and expanded newscasts in nearly every key daypart. Tribune acquired WTTV in 2002 and moved both stations the next year to their present studios in northwest Indianapolis. WTTV became a CBS affiliate in 2015 with a partially separate news operation.

== History ==
=== WPDS-TV: Construction and early years ===
The first group to express interest in channel 59 in Indianapolis was a group backed by Clint Murchison, who proposed subscription television (STV) operation for the channel in 1978. The group, Channel 59 of Indiana, formally filed that July. United Television Corporation of Indiana (owned by United Cable) filed the next month with a similar plan. That December, Indianapolis Television—a consortium of shopping mall and Indiana Pacers co-owner Melvin Simon, his brother Fred, and Gerald Kraft—filed for channel 59. A fourth application, from Indianapolis 59 (subsidiary of a young Sinclair Broadcast Group), was also received.

Indianapolis Television Corporation secured the channel in 1981 under the terms of a settlement with the other applicants, reimbursing its competitors a combined $128,300 in the process. While it, too, had proposed subscription programming, changes in technology and the industry led the firm to hold off on building an STV outlet and ultimately find the concept unviable. The permit, initially with the call sign WSMK, soon changed hands. In 1983, 80 percent of the stock in the company was sold to local computer services company Anacomp, Inc.; Melvin retained 10 percent, while his other brother, Herbert Simon, bought a 10-percent stake. The $800,000 acquisition produced capital to be invested in the construction of the station. Anacomp was headed by Ron Palamara, while one of the vice presidents in Anacomp was Chris Duffy, who had been the general manager at WTHR for five years before joining Anacomp in 1981. The reconfigured ownership group, known as USA Communications, changed channel 59's call letters to WPDS-TV, after Palamara, Duffy and Simon's initials.

Palamara had promised the station would be on air for New Year's Eve 1983; due to weather delays, that turned into Chinese New Year's Eve when WPDS-TV signed on February 1, 1984. Originally operating as an independent station, channel 59 maintained a general entertainment programming format featuring cartoons, movies, classic sitcoms and drama series. The station originally operated from studios located at 1440 North Meridian Street along Indianapolis's "Media Row", which had previously been occupied by WFYI. Under USA Communications, the station had a heavy emphasis on local programming. The station produced 59er Diner, a local kids' show, plus exercise, gospel, and stand-up comedy programs, as well as a late-night talk show, Night Talk with Dick Wolfsie. A local news department also featured in channel 59's early months, including a half-hour 9 p.m. newscast; due to low ratings, this was scaled back to periodic news updates at the end of August. Duffy told Richard K. Shull of The Indianapolis News, "I made a strategic error in how viewers perceive us. They see us as an entertainment vehicle. They look to the network stations for news."

=== WXIN: Outlet ownership ===
Palamara, Duffy, and Simon sold the station to Outlet Communications (through its Atlin Communications subsidiary) in a deal announced in October 1984 and completed in February 1985. The $22 million (equivalent to $55.8 million in 2025) transaction was touted by Duffy as among the largest for a TV station in its first year of operation. The station's call letters were then changed to the current WXIN on August 10, 1985, a decision precipitated not by the ownership change but by a desire to avoid confusion (particularly in ratings diaries) with the similar-sounding cable channel WTBS and PBS. Under Outlet, the station maintained its competitiveness with established Indianapolis-market independent station WTTV; the station touted a total audience share of 7%, which it claimed was among the largest for a new independent in a top-35 market (beaten by KTXH in Houston and WBFS-TV in Miami).

WXIN became an affiliate of the Fox Broadcasting Company when the network launched on October 9, 1986. With aggressive program purchases, the station eroded WTTV's market share and moved ahead in the early evening time slot of 6–8 p.m., aided by that station's multi-year bankruptcy. However, these purchases were expensive and accumulated debt.

In December 1987, Outlet Communications put WXIN and WATL in Atlanta on the market to repay debt from the related company that owned both stations' licenses, Atlin Communications. In May 1988, Emmis Communications, an Indianapolis-based radio station group owner, announced it would purchase the Indianapolis station for $17.5 million (equivalent to $41 million in 2025), marking its first television property. Emmis, which had twice attempted to buy WTTV, needed a waiver from the Federal Communications Commission (FCC) to own WXIN as well as local radio station WENS. Outlet's directors rebuffed the offer because its $15 million bid for WATL was seen as too low. Emmis sued seeking damages and to compel Atlin to sell WXIN to it, but the lawsuit was dismissed in federal court. During the attempted Emmis purchase, WXIN acquired the rights to telecast Indiana Pacers basketball road games; these had been telecast since 1974 by WTTV. The relationship lasted five seasons, concluding in 1993 when WXIN was no longer able to air the team due to its commitment to Fox network programming, which had grown as the network offered more programming to its affiliates.

=== Chase and Renaissance ownership ===
The Atlin sale process came to an end in 1989, as Outlet agreed to sell WXIN and WATL, plus two radio stations in Washington, D.C., to Chase Broadcasting of Hartford, Connecticut, for $120 million (equivalent to $27.1 million in 2025). The purchase made Chase, which already owned WTIC-TV in Hartford and was buying KDVR in Denver, the largest single owner of Fox-affiliated stations when it was concluded in March 1990.

In 1991, Chase Broadcasting announced it would sell some or all of its properties in order to invest in new business ventures in Eastern Europe after the end of the Cold War, particularly successful cable television systems in Poland. Four of its five Fox affiliates, including WXIN, were sold to Renaissance Communications of Greenwich, Connecticut. Renaissance tamped down rumors that WXIN and WTTV would be brought under common operation, either via a local marketing agreement or the Fox affiliation moving outright to WTTV paired with a donation of channel 59. These rumors surfaced again in 1996, when Sinclair Broadcast Group—having just acquired WTTV—was rumored as an acquirer for WXIN and the Renaissance group.

=== Tribune ownership ===
Chicago-based Tribune Broadcasting bought Renaissance's television properties for $1.13 billion on July 7, 1996.

Tribune acquired WTTV and its satellite station in Kokomo, WTTK (channel 29), from Sinclair on April 29, 2002; this created the market's first television duopoly under current FCC regulations with WXIN when the purchase was finalized on July 24. With WXIN already at capacity in its existing building, the company began investigating new sites for a larger facility, leaving behind Meridian Street, the "media row" home to all of the city's other major TV stations. By year's end, zoning approval had been obtained for a site inside Intech Park on the northwest side of Indianapolis. Construction began in January 2003, and the 51,200-square-foot (4,760 m^{2}) facility was completed at the end of the year.

Beginning in 2003, WXIN was the broadcast home for the state lottery game show Hoosier Millionaire, which had aired on WTTV. As part of the move, the show's hosts were changed to Cody Stark and Catt Sadler, who presented morning show Fox 59 a.m. at the time. Hoosier Millionaire was canceled by the Indiana Lottery in 2005 due to declining ticket sales. In 2006, the station picked up the rights to the Indianapolis Colts coaches' shows; The shows later returned to WISH-TV. Beginning in 2015, WXIN and WTTV acquired the rights to all Colts preseason games and coaches' shows.

WTTV became a CBS affiliate on January 1, 2015. It broadcast dedicated local newscasts using some of the same staff.

=== Sale to Nexstar Media Group ===
After a failed attempt by Sinclair Broadcast Group to acquire Tribune Media, Nexstar Media Group announced in December 2018 that it would acquire the company. Nexstar already owned WISH-TV and WNDY-TV in the Indianapolis market, and due to FCC ownership rules and scrutiny, Nexstar was required to divest two of the stations; the company ultimately elected to sell WISH and WNDY to the owner of Bayou City Broadcasting, in favor of retaining WTTV and WXIN. The deal closed on September 19, 2019.

On June 13, 2024, Fox Sports announced an agreement to become the exclusive broadcaster of the IndyCar Series beginning in 2025 under a multi-year deal, with all races airing on the Fox network. As a result, local television rights to the Indianapolis 500 moved to WXIN from NBC affiliate WTHR. Per Indianapolis Motor Speedway rules, the live broadcast is blacked out on channel 59 if the race does not sell out, which it did in 2025 and 2026.

On August 19, 2025, Nexstar Media Group agreed to acquire Tegna for $6.2 billion. In Indianapolis, Tegna already owned WTHR and WALV-CD. The deal was approved and completed in March 2026. As part of the transaction, Nexstar committed to the divestiture of WTHR within two years, along with five other stations, mostly in markets where the two companies combined held four TV station licenses.

== News operation ==
In late 1990, WXIN management began analyzing the creation of a local newscast after WTTV discontinued its local news effort. The station also discussed contracting WISH-TV to produce the newscast after WTTV struck a deal to air a newscast produced by WRTV. At the time, WTHR offered a 10 p.m. newscast as part of an early prime time experiment that was performing poorly. The station opted to produce its own news effort and hired Jim Sanders from WGME in Portland, Maine, to serve as news director.

With a news staff of 18, Fox 59 Nightcast debuted on September 23, 1991, with the anchor team of Bob Donaldson, Caroline Thau, Chris Wright, and Brian Hammons. Wright, a meteorologist, was the first African-American to be a lead anchor on a weeknight newscast in Indianapolis. After just two weeks, the program was trimmed to a half-hour in length to appease fans of Star Trek: The Next Generation, which had originally been removed to make way for the news hour, and because WTTV recommitted to its newscast from WRTV. Fox 59 Nightcast was launched days before Chase declared its intention to sell its TV stations, and Steve Hall of The Indianapolis Star felt the news department was doomed to be cut by any prospective buyer; a rival general manager indicated to his employees that he believed WXIN would cancel the newscast within six weeks. This did not come to pass. Fox named WXIN its affiliate of the year in 1992, citing Nightcast as a model for future news startups by Fox affiliates, and the newscast—while second to WTTV's WRTV-produced newscast in total viewership—performed better in key young adult demographics.

In 1994, the news department expanded into space at 1440 North Meridian previously used by radio station WZPL as its offices, and that October, WXIN surpassed WTTV in 10 p.m. news total ratings for the first time. Thau departed in 1995 and was replaced by Ginger Gadsden, the first Black woman to be the lead anchor of a late-night newscast in the market. Nightcast was renamed Fox News at 10 in September 1995. WTTV's WRTV-produced 10 p.m. newscast ceased airing on December 31, 2002, after Tribune's acquisition of that station; it had lived on until that point to help WTTV, which held the Indiana Lottery contract, comply with a provision that required drawing results to be broadcast within a newscast.

WXIN expanded news programming outside its established 10 p.m. slot in April 1999, when it premiered Fox 59 a.m. Formatted as a mix of news, entertainment and lifestyle features with a looser, "personality-driven" style inspired by morning radio programs, the show initially aired from 6 to 9 a.m. The program was reformatted as a more traditional morning newscast in 2004 and grew to beat competing local and national morning news programs in the 25–54 age demographic.

In 2004, Jerry Martin took over as general manager of WXIN; under his tenure and that of successor Larry Delia, the station grew its news output. On April 17, 2006, WXIN expanded its 10 p.m. newscast to one hour, the first in a series of news expansions. These included a 5 a.m. hour of the morning newscast in 2008, a 5 p.m. newscast and three-hour weekend morning newscasts in 2010, 4:30 and later 4 a.m. hours of the Fox 59 Morning News, an additional hour for the weekend morning newscasts, a 6 p.m. newscast in 2012, and 7 and 11 p.m. newscasts in 2014. A station that had produced 21 1/2 hours weekly of local news in 2004 grew to 66 hours a week of news in 2014.

WXIN debuted IN Focus, a Sunday morning program focusing on political and civic issues, on May 10, 2015. A new local lifestyle show, Indy Now, was added to the station's schedule at 10 a.m. in 2021.

=== Notable current on-air staff ===
- Lindy Thackston – weekday morning anchor (2013–2020, since 2021)

=== Notable former on-air staff ===
- Aishah Hasnie – investigative reporter, 2011–2019
- Sara Snow – weekday morning news reporter and fill-in anchor, 2000s

== Technical information ==
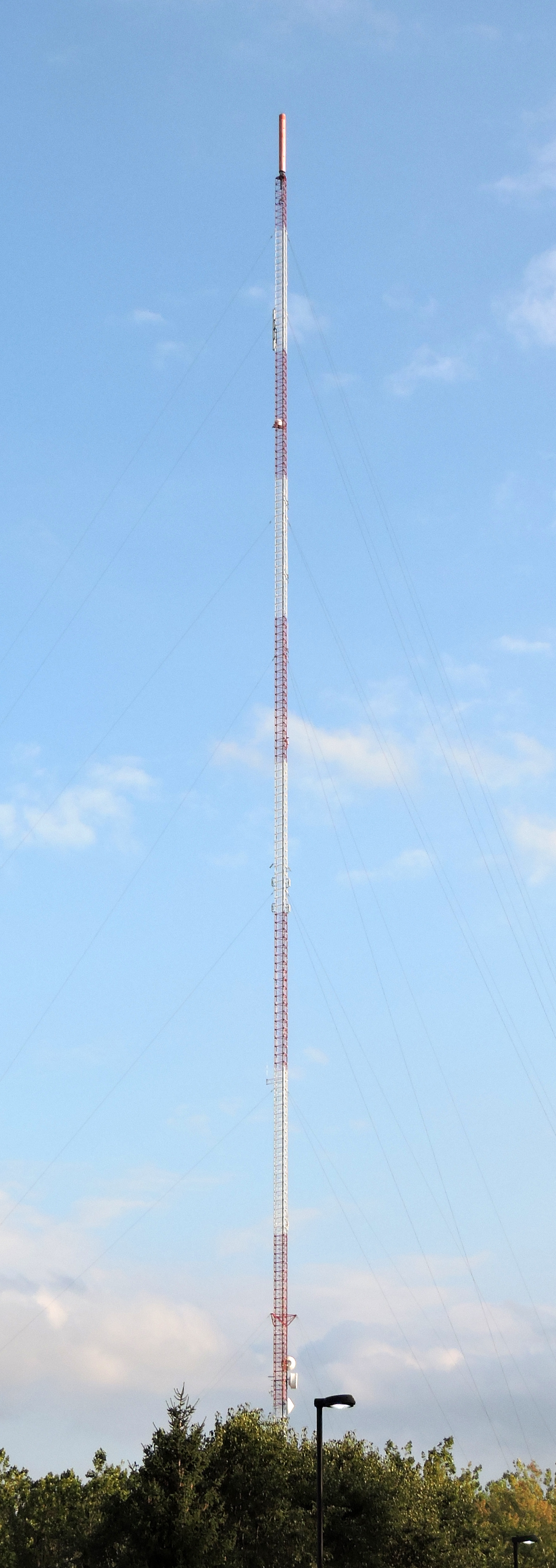
The WXIN and WTTK tower in Indianapolis

=== Subchannels ===
WXIN broadcasts from a transmitter on West 73rd Street. The station's signal is multiplexed:

Subchannels of WXIN
Subchannel	Res.	Short name	Programming
59.1	720p	WXIN-DT	Fox
59.2	480i	AntTV	Antenna TV (4:3)
59.3	480i	Defy	Defy
59.4	480i	Charge!	Charge!
29.1	1080i	WTTK-DT	CBS (WTTK)

Broadcast on behalf of another station

=== Analog-to-digital conversion ===
WXIN began broadcasting a digital signal on UHF channel 45 on October 28, 1999. It shut down its analog signal, over UHF channel 59, on June 12, 2009—the official date on which full-power television stations in the United States transitioned from analog to digital broadcasts under federal mandate. The station's digital signal continued to broadcast on its pre-transition channel 45.

WXIN moved its digital signal from channel 45 to channel 22 on October 18, 2019, as a result of the 2016 United States wireless spectrum auction.
