= Miranda Throckmorton =

American sprint car driver (born 1992)

- Born: 1992 (age 33–34); Avon, Indiana, U.S.
- Education: Indiana University-Purdue University Indianapolis
- Occupation: Racecar driver
- Parent(s): Bill and Norma Throckmorton

Miranda Nicole Throckmorton (born January 14, 1992) is an American sprint car driver.

== Origins ==
Throckmorton was born into a racing family in Avon, Indiana, a western suburb of Indianapolis. She began her racing career in 1996 at the age of four. Her parents are Bill and Norma Throckmorton, and she has no siblings. She graduated from Harris Academy High School in 2010, and is a graduate of Indiana University-Purdue University Indianapolis (IUPUI).

== Career ==
When she first began racing, Throckmorton was competing in Micro Midgets, and soon after, graduated to Quarter Midgets races. She excelled in these competitions and continued to race Quarter Midgets for eight years. In addition to Micro and Quarter Midgets races, she has raced 410 winged and non-winged sprint cars, Midgets, Jr. Sprints, 600cc Micro-Sprints and USAC Kenyon Midgets. She has had multiple top-three finishes at the USAC Kenyon Midgets and multiple top-five finishes in the 600 Micro Midgets.

== Racing accomplishments ==
- Throckmorton has set four track records during her eight years racing in Quarter Midgets
- She has earned five Regional and five State Championships racing in Quarter Midgets from 1996 to 2004.
- First woman to win a non-winged 410 sprint car feature event in the United States
- Placed 4th in points at the 2009 Midwest Allstar Sprint Car Series
- Placed 3rd in points at the 2008 Midwest Allstar Sprint Car Series
- Has earned a feature win with 600 Micro Midgets and a feature win with non-winged 410 sprint car
- Placed 5th in 2007 Paragon Speedway Points Standings with non-winged 410 sprint car
- Placed 5th in the USAC Kenyon Midget Points Standings in 2005
- Awarded the Lyn St. James Project Podium Grant
- Graduate of the Lyn St. James Driver Development Program
- First woman to win a 410 non-winged sprint car feature event in the United States
- 2008 Rookie of the Year winner of Midwest Allstar Sprint Car Series
- Winner of the 2008 Women in the Winner's Circle's Project Podium Grants Program
- Voted the 2007 Hoosier Auto Racing Fans First Year Driver Award
- Winner of PitFit Training Scholarship (2007 and 2008)
- First graduate of North American Auto Racing Series (NAMARS) Speaking of Motorsports course
- Speaker for the NAMARS Awards Ceremony

== Twitter controversy ==
Throckmorton found herself the subject of public scrutiny when she posted a series of tweets while stuck in traffic due to the funeral of IMPD Police Office Rod Bradway. Throckmorton's tweets expressed disdain for the choice of the city of Indianapolis to shut down streets for the officer's funeral, as well as incredulity at the number of officers and civilians present. She also compared the role of the police officer, who had been killed in the line of duty while saving a woman and child, to the level of danger faced by race car drivers. Throckmorton issued an apology, but continued to face public admonishing for her comments.
