= WALV-CD =

Television station in Indianapolis

- Indianapolis, Indiana; United States
- Channels: Digital: 17 (UHF); Virtual: 46
- Branding: MeTV Indianapolis

Programming
- Affiliations: 13.13: NBC; 46.1: MeTV; for others, see § Subchannels

Ownership
- Owner: Tegna Inc., a subsidiary of Nexstar Media Group; (VideOhio, Inc.)
- Sister stations: WTHR; Nexstar: WTTV/WTTK, WXIN

History
- First air date: May 1991
- Former call signs: W27AR (1988–1995); WALV-LP (1995–2002); WALV-CA (2002–2012)
- Former channel numbers: Analog: 27 (UHF, 1988–2002), 50 (UHF, 2002–2012); Digital: 46 (UHF, 2012–2019)
- Former affiliations: Independent (1988–2000); SkyTrak Weather Network (2000–2013); Cozi TV (2013–2017)
- Call sign meaning: Station's original branding was 27 Alive

Technical information
- Licensing authority: FCC
- Facility ID: 70161
- Class: CD
- ERP: 8.18 kW
- HAAT: 268.2 m (880 ft)
- Transmitter coordinates: 39°55′43″N 86°10′55″W
- Translator(s): WTHR 13.03 (VHF) Indianapolis

Links
- Public license information: Public file; LMS

WALV-CD (channel 46) is a low-power, Class A television station in Indianapolis, Indiana, United States, affiliated with MeTV. It is owned by the Tegna subsidiary of Nexstar Media Group alongside NBC affiliate WTHR (channel 13); Nexstar also owns CBS affiliates WTTV/WTTK (channels 4 and 29) and Fox affiliate WXIN (channel 59). WALV-CD and WTHR share studios on North Meridian Street (south of I-65) in downtown Indianapolis; WALV-CD's transmitter is located near Ditch Road and West 96th Street (near I-465) in Carmel. The MeTV programming is mirrored on WTHR's third digital subchannel.

WALV has been associated with WTHR since it was put on the air in May 1991. Originally simulcasting channel 13 with occasional breaks for specific local and alternate programs, it operated as a secondary station with its own programming known as "27 Alive" from 1994 to 2000. The launch of 27 Alive included several dedicated local newscasts from WTHR. It was converted to the SkyTrak Weather Network, featuring news and weather information, and continued to air this programming until affiliating with Cozi TV in 2013. It is still occasionally used for overflow programming from WTHR.

== History ==
=== Early history ===
Dispatch Broadcast Group, the owner of WTHR, obtained the construction permit for channel 27 in 1988, but it did not begin broadcasting until May 1991. It served primarily as a simulcaster of WTHR, breaking from channel 13's signal for network programs that it preempted and for programs of local interest, such as high school football and basketball.

With the advent of retransmission consent rules, WTHR reached deals with most of the major cable television systems in the area to provide a channel slot for W27AR on their systems. In January 1994, the station relaunched as 27 Alive with a new lineup. The station featured daytime rolling news coverage in a news wheel format, using WTHR staff and some dedicated employees; dedicated 7 a.m. and 10 p.m. newscasts; programming from National Empowerment Television (NET); a daily morning talk show, The Morning Show; and Time Out, a nightly sports talk show, as well as syndicated talk shows. Within months, the news portion of 27 Alive's lineup was scaled back, with the news staffers merging into WTHR's newsroom. The station changed its call letters to WALV-LP on December 1, 1995, to reflect its name. That year, it aired longform coverage of the criminal murder trial of O. J. Simpson. It also dropped NET due to low ratings. Meanwhile, WTHR reached a deal to produce a 10 p.m. newscast for WNDY-TV beginning in March 1996, displacing the WALV newscast.

In January 2000, 27 Alive was replaced by the SkyTrak Weather Network, specializing in weather forecasts and traffic headlines and competing with a similar service from WISH-TV. The station moved to channel 50 in 2002.

WALV shut down its analog signal in 2012 and began broadcasting in digital on channel 46, using virtual channel 46 instead of 50.

=== Diginet affiliations ===
WTHR obtained an affiliation with Cozi TV, a new diginet owned by NBC airing classic TV programming, in 2013 and placed it on WALV-CD and one of its own subchannels. It continued to air a limited amount of its own programming; for instance, when WTHR expanded its morning newscast to 4 a.m. in 2014, it displaced Early Today to WALV-CD. Some WTHR syndicated programs moved to WALV-CD during the 2016 Summer Olympics and 2018 Winter Olympics. WALV simulcasts the 4–5 a.m. hour of WTHR's weekday morning and 6–7 a.m. hour weekend morning newscasts.

By May 26, 2017, WALV-CD began simulcasting MeTV along with WTHR 13.3, dropping Cozi TV programming, which continued on WTHR 13.2. In the spectrum reallocation repack, the station moved to physical channel 17 from 46.

On June 11, 2019, Dispatch announced it would sell its broadcasting assets, including WALV-CD and WTHR, to Tegna Inc. for $535 million in cash. The sale was approved by the FCC on July 29, and was completed on August 8.

Beginning with the 2024 season, WTHR and WALV-CD became the local broadcast home of Indiana Fever women's basketball, timed with Caitlin Clark's arrival on the team as the WNBA's #1 draft pick that year. Of the 17 games the two stations aired, seven were broadcast on WALV.

On August 19, 2025, Nexstar Media Group agreed to acquire Tegna for $6.2 billion. In Indianapolis, Nexstar already owned WTTV and WXIN. The deal was approved and completed in March 2026. As part of the transaction, Nexstar committed to the divestiture of WTHR within two years, though WALV-CD was not considered.

== Subchannels ==
The station's signal is multiplexed:

Subchannels of WALV-CD
| Subchannel | Res. | Short name | Programming |
|---|---|---|---|
| 13.13 | 1080i | WTHR-HD | NBC (WTHR UHF simulcast) |
| 46.1 | 720p | WALV-CD | MeTV |
| 46.2 | 480i | CRIME | True Crime Network |
| 46.3 | 480i | ShopLC | Shop LC |
| 46.4 | 480i | OPEN | [Blank] |
| 46.5 | 480i | OPEN | [Blank] |
| 46.6 | 480i | OPEN | [Blank] |

Simulcast of subchannels of another station
