= Chris Jones (defensive tackle, born 1990) =

American football player (born 1990)

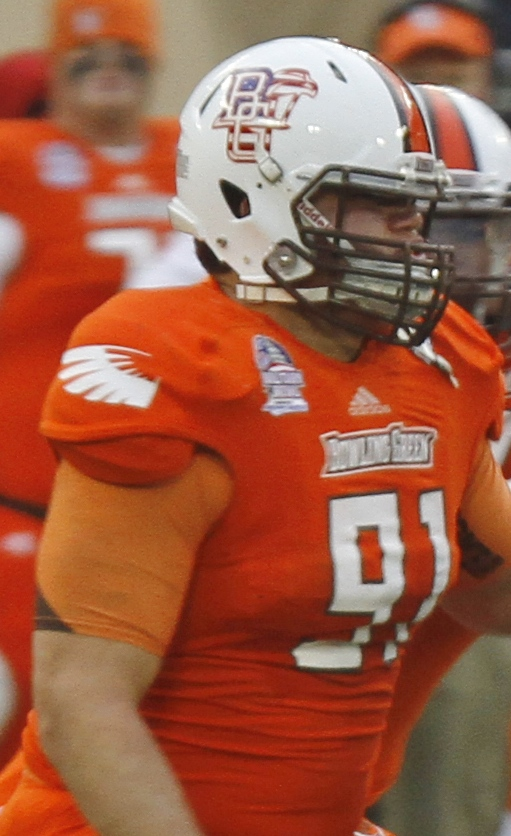
- Jones with Bowling Green during the 2012 Military Bowl

No. 94, 52, 93
- Position: Defensive tackle

Personal information
- Born: July 12, 1990 (age 36); Columbus, Ohio, U.S.
- Listed height: 6 ft 1 in (1.85 m)
- Listed weight: 293 lb (133 kg)

Career information
- High school: Brownsburg (Brownsburg, Indiana)
- College: Bowling Green (2009–2012)
- NFL draft: 2013: 6th round, 198th overall pick

Career history
- Houston Texans (2013)*; Tampa Bay Buccaneers (2013); New England Patriots (2013–2015); Miami Dolphins (2016); San Francisco 49ers (2016–2017); New York Jets (2018)*; San Francisco 49ers (2018)*
- * Offseason or practice squad member only

Awards and highlights
- Super Bowl champion (XLIX); First-team All-American (2012); MAC Defensive Player of the Year (2012); 2× First-team All-MAC (2011, 2012)

Career NFL statistics
- Total tackles: 102
- Sacks: 9
- Stats at Pro Football Reference

Christopher Dwightstone Jones (born July 12, 1990) is an American former professional football player who was a defensive tackle in the National Football League (NFL). He was selected in the sixth round of the 2013 NFL draft by the Houston Texans. He played college football for the Bowling Green Falcons. He was also a member of the Tampa Bay Buccaneers, New England Patriots, Miami Dolphins, New York Jets, and San Francisco 49ers. Jones won Super Bowl XLIX with the Patriots in 2015.

== College career ==
Jones played for Bowling Green from 2009 to 2012. In 2009, he had 29 total tackles. The following season, he had 39 tackles and 6.0 sacks. He then had 47 tackles and 8.5 sacks in 2011 and was named to the All-Mid-American Conference (MAC) first-team. In 2012, Jones had 42 tackles, and he ranked third in the nation with 12.5 sacks. He was the MAC defensive player of the year and was named to the All-MAC first-team again.

== Professional career ==
Pre-draft measurables
Height	Weight	Arm length	Hand span	Wingspan	40-yard dash	10-yard split	20-yard split	20-yard shuttle	Three-cone drill	Vertical jump	Broad jump	Bench press
6 ft 1 5/8 in (1.87 m)	302 lb (137 kg)	32 3/4 in (0.83 m)	9 in (0.23 m)	6 ft 6 5/8 in (2.00 m)	5.10 s	1.87 s	3.03 s	4.44 s	7.34 s	31 in (0.79 m)	8 ft 9 in (2.67 m)	30 reps
All values from NFL Scouting Combine/Bowling Green Pro Day

=== Houston Texans ===
Jones was selected by the Houston Texans in the sixth round (198th overall) of the 2013 NFL draft.

He was released by the Houston Texans on August 31, 2013.

=== Tampa Bay Buccaneers ===
Jones was claimed by the Tampa Bay Buccaneers after his release from the Houston Texans on September 1, 2013, and was inactive for the Tampa Bay's season opener against the New York Jets. He was released by the Buccaneers on September 10, 2013.

=== New England Patriots ===
==== 2013 ====
After the Buccaneers waived Jones, the New England Patriots claimed him off waivers. Jones recorded his first career sack against the Cincinnati Bengals on October 6, 2013. On October 20, during overtime of the Patriots' Week 7 game against the New York Jets, Jones was called for a 15-yard unsportsmanlike conduct call on a Nick Folk missed 56-yard field goal that would have given the Patriots the ball around midfield. The call was for violating a rule, altered that season, prohibiting pushing a teammate into the opponent's formation (it was the first time that call had been made). Folk went on to hit a 42-yard field goal that gave the Jets the win, in a game where Jones also recorded two sacks.

Jones finished the season with 6.0 sacks, which was 2nd amongst rookies.

==== 2014 ====
Against the New York Jets, Jones blocked Nick Folk's attempted field goal, securing the victory for the Patriots. The feat also earned him AFC Special Teams Player of the Week honors for Week 7 of the 2014 NFL season. He finished the season with three sacks and 15 tackles.

==== 2015 ====
Jones and the Patriots won Super Bowl XLIX over the defending champion Seattle Seahawks, Jones allegedly played the game with a torn calf. Jones calf injury caused him to miss the entire 2015 NFL season.

The Patriots waived Jones on April 15, 2016.

=== Miami Dolphins ===
On April 18, 2016, Jones was claimed off waivers by the Miami Dolphins. He was released by the Dolphins as part of final roster cuts but re-signed with the team on September 14, 2016. He played in seven games, starting none, with no sacks and four tackles. He was released by the Dolphins on November 7, 2016.

=== San Francisco 49ers (first stint) ===
Jones was claimed off waivers by the 49ers on November 8, 2016. He was made starter against the Dolphins on November 27, 2016, and started again the following week.

On March 16, 2017, Jones re-signed with the 49ers. He was placed on injured reserve on September 2, 2017.

=== New York Jets ===
On June 5, 2018, Jones signed with the New York Jets. He was released on June 14, 2018.

=== San Francisco 49ers (second stint) ===
On August 22, 2018, Jones signed with the 49ers. He was released on August 31, 2018.

== Personal life ==
Jones married his wife Angela on New Year's Day, 2014. The ceremony was held on the 50-yard-line on the field of Gillette Stadium.
