= Brownsburg Community School Corporation =

School district in Indiana

Address
- 310 Stadium Drive Brownsburg, Indiana, 46112; United States
- Coordinates: 39°50′19″N 86°23′23″W

District information
- Type: Public
- Motto: Higher Achievement, Together
- Grades: Pre K through 12
- Superintendent: Dr. Kat Jessup
- Schools: Elementary 8; Middle 2; High 1
- NCES District ID: 1801020

Students and staff
- Students: 9,296
- Athletic conference: Hoosier Crossroads Conference
- District mascot: Bulldogs, named "Barker."
- Colors: Purple and white

Other information
- Website: www.brownsburg.k12.in.us

Brownsburg Community School Corporation (BCSC) is a public school district serving grades PK–12 in Brownsburg, Indiana. The reported enrollment of the BCSC during the 2018–2019 school year was 9,296. The superintendent is Dr. Kat Jessup

BCSC operates eight elementary schools, two middle schools, and one high school. In addition, Brownsburg has an Early Childhood Center (preschool), Harris Academy (an alternative high school offering specialized timelines for students) and ALPHA, a program for students with specific emotional problems. During the 2017–2018 school year, Indiana's A-F school accountability rating for 9 schools was an A, the highest rating achievable. Lincoln Elementary and Crossroads Elementary were not included in the ratings, as they were not open for the 2017–2018 school year.

The school district is made up of areas in Brown and Lincoln townships. It includes almost all of Brownsburg and portions of Avon.

== Schools ==
The following schools are located within the district:

=== High schools ===
- Brownsburg High School
- Harris Academy

=== Middle schools ===
- Brownsburg East Middle School
- Brownsburg West Middle School

=== Elementary schools ===
- Brown Elementary
- Cardinal Elementary
- Crossroads Elementary
- Delaware Trail Elementary
- Eagle Elementary
- Lincoln Elementary
- Reagan Elementary
- White Lick Elementary

=== Preschools ===
- Brownsburg Early Childhood Center
