= WTHR =

Television station in Indianapolis

- Indianapolis, Indiana; United States
- Channels: Digital: 13 (VHF); Virtual: 13
- Branding: WTHR 13; 13 News

Programming
- Affiliations: 13.1: NBC; for others, see § Subchannels

Ownership
- Owner: Tegna Inc., a subsidiary of Nexstar Media Group (sale pending to an unknown third party); (VideoIndiana, Inc.)
- Sister stations: WALV-CD; Nexstar: WTTV/WTTK, WXIN

History
- First air date: October 30, 1957
- Former call signs: WLWI (1957–1976)
- Former channel numbers: Analog: 13 (VHF, 1957–2009); Digital: 46 (UHF, 1998–2009)
- Former affiliations: ABC (1957–1979); NET (per program, 1969–1970)
- Call sign meaning: "Thirteen"

Technical information
- Licensing authority: FCC
- Facility ID: 70162
- ERP: 42.1 kW; 77 kW (application)
- HAAT: 299 m (981 ft)
- Transmitter coordinates: 39°55′43″N 86°10′55″W
- Translator(s): WALV-CD 13.13 Indianapolis (city)

Links
- Public license information: Public file; LMS
- Website: www.wthr.com

WTHR (channel 13) is a television station in Indianapolis, Indiana, United States, affiliated with NBC. It is owned by the Tegna subsidiary of Nexstar Media Group alongside Class A MeTV affiliate WALV-CD (channel 46); Nexstar also owns CBS affiliates WTTV/WTTK (channels 4 and 29) and Fox affiliate WXIN (channel 59). WTHR and WALV-CD share studios on North Meridian Street (south of I-65) in downtown Indianapolis; WTHR's transmitter is located near Ditch Road and West 96th Street in Carmel.

== History ==
=== WLWI ===
The station first signed on the air on October 30, 1957, as WLWI. Founded by the Crosley Broadcasting Corporation, it originally operated as an ABC affiliate, taking the affiliation from Bloomington-licensed WTTV (channel 4, now a CBS affiliate), which had affiliated with the network one year earlier. WLWI was an ABC affiliate for the next 22 years. It also made an arrangement with National Educational Television to carry the first season of Sesame Street until WFYI (channel 20), the PBS member station in Indianapolis, signed on in 1970.

WLWI was one of four Crosley stations that made up the WLW Television Network. The other stations, all in Ohio, were the regional network's flagship WLWT in Cincinnati, WLWC (now WCMH-TV) in Columbus, and WLWD (now WDTN) in Dayton. Crosley also owned WLW radio in Cincinnati, WLWA (now WXIA-TV) in Atlanta, and WOAI-TV in San Antonio. Channel 13 and its sister stations in Ohio, interconnected via microwave link, shared common programming such as The Ruth Lyons 50-50 Club, The Bob Braun Show, The Paul Dixon Show, Midwestern Hayride, The Phil Donahue Show, and Cincinnati Reds baseball game telecasts, and had similar on-air branding which reflected their connection to each other. Channel 13 called itself "WLW-I" to highlight its association with WLW radio, a 50,000-watt clear channel station whose daytime signal reached portions of the Indianapolis area.

From 1957 to 1962, the station was tied up in one of the most heated licensing disputes in early television history. The Federal Communications Commission (FCC) originally awarded the construction permit to build a television station on channel 13 to a group headed by Union Federal Savings and Loan president George Sadlier. However, after an appeal, the FCC reversed its decision and awarded the permit to Crosley. One of the other competitors, WIBC owner Richard Fairbanks, then sued to force new license hearings. Fairbanks contended that the FCC had erred in awarding the last VHF channel allocation in Indianapolis to a company based in Ohio when there were viable applicants based in Indiana. The suit, however, was filed too late to prevent WLWI from signing on under Crosley ownership.

The District of Columbia Court of Appeals overturned the FCC's decision in 1958, but allowed Crosley to continue running the station pending further action by the FCC. In 1961, the FCC awarded Fairbanks the channel 13 license, but Crosley appealed. The following year, Crosley and Fairbanks reached a deal in which Crosley traded WLWA to Fairbanks in return for being allowed to keep WLWI; both stations became sister stations in 2019 when the now-WXIA-TV owner Tegna acquired channel 13.

Amid this instability in ownership, WLWI found the going rather difficult. It was also dogged by a weaker network affiliation; ABC would not be on an equal footing with CBS and NBC in the ratings until the 1970s. WLWI spent most of its first 17 years of operation languishing as a third place also-ran behind NBC affiliate WFBM-TV (channel 6, now ABC affiliate WRTV) and then-CBS affiliate WISH-TV (channel 8, now a CW affiliate). In some cases, it even fell to fourth place in the local ratings behind then-independent station WTTV (despite WTTV being licensed to Bloomington and having incomplete signal coverage of the Indianapolis market at the time).

=== WTHR ===
Ad placed in Indianapolis newspapers for WTHR after it switched affiliations from ABC to NBC in 1979. Featured in the ad is Indianapolis native Jane Pauley, who was on Today at the time.

WTHR's previous logo from 1995 to 2014.

In late 1974, Avco Broadcasting Corporation (which Crosley Broadcasting was renamed in 1968) announced it was exiting the broadcasting business in an effort to raise cash. The Wolfe family, owners of the Columbus Dispatch and WBNS-AM-FM-TV in Columbus, bought WLWI from Avco in August 1975; the Wolfes changed the station's call letters to WTHR on January 29, 1976. To celebrate the callsign change, a marketing campaign was launched ("You're on Top with 13," whose jingle was composed by Al Ham). With new ownership in place, the quality of the station's programming began to improve, but WTHR remained stuck at third place in the ratings behind WISH and WRTV.

Meanwhile, ABC gradually rose to first place during the decade and was seeking out stronger affiliates in many markets. At the same time, NBC tumbled to last place among the "Big Three" networks. Under the circumstances, long-dominant WRTV was very receptive to an offer from ABC. WTHR and WRTV swapped networks on May 31, 1979, with channel 13 becoming the market's NBC affiliate and channel 6 becoming an ABC affiliate. Before signing with WTHR, NBC also considered affiliating with the longer-established WTTV. WTTV was heavily committed to sports programming that would lead to significant preemptions of network prime time programming, a factor that hurt WTTV in its negotiations with NBC. The final ABC program to air on WTHR was a repeat of Mork & Mindy at 7 p.m. on May 31, while the first NBC show on the station was the first part of the miniseries The Innocent and the Damned, which aired an hour later. On the same day as the switch, VideoIndiana, the Dispatch subsidiary that held WTHR's license, filed a $33 million antitrust lawsuit against ABC and WRTV's parent company McGraw-Hill, alleging that WRTV's switch was closely tied to an earlier ABC affiliation deal involving McGraw-Hill's San Diego station, KGTV. The switch to NBC eventually provided a major windfall for WTHR starting when the NFL's Indianapolis Colts moved from Baltimore in 1984; until NBC lost the rights to the NFL to CBS in 1998 (effectively moving the games to WISH-TV and later WTTV in 2015), WTHR aired the bulk of the team's regular season games under the AFC package. Ratings gradually improved in the 1980s with NBC's powerful prime time lineup, but not enough to get the station out of third place.

On April 7, 1991, WTHR participated in an experiment in which it moved NBC prime time programming one hour earlier (mirroring the scheduling of the network's prime time lineup in the Central and Mountain time zones); the half-hour late evening newscast also moved from 11 to 10 p.m. as a result. (The experiment, which lasted until the fall of 1992, was succeeded by similar efforts by KRON-TV and KPIX-TV in San Francisco, and KOVR in Sacramento later in the decade, though for WTHR, was also partly done to compensate for Indiana's long-term time zone adoption issues.)

Channel 13 first saw a significant ratings boost in the mid-1990s, buoyed by NBC's stronger programming as well as improvements in its news department. It has long since left its ratings-challenged past behind, and is now one of the strongest NBC affiliates in the nation.

On September 2, 2007, WTHR celebrated its 50th anniversary; the station used the song "Carousels (Dreaming of Tomorrow)" by Columbus-based rock band Alamoth Lane in an image campaign to promote the event (the song was also used in a market campaign by Columbus sister station WBNS to promote its upgrade to high definition newscasts).

WTHR shut down its analog signal, over VHF channel 13, at 12:37 a.m. on June 12, 2009, the official date on which full-power television stations in the United States transitioned from analog to digital broadcasts under federal mandate. The station's digital signal relocated from its pre-transition UHF channel 46 to VHF channel 13 for post-transition operations.

In February 2009, WTHR began affiliating its third subchannel with Universal Sports. Starting in August 2009, WTHR preempted regular programming on the subchannel for high school football and basketball games under the titles, Operation Football Live and Operation Basketball Live, with marketing support from VYPE High School Sports Magazine. WTHR formerly operated the SkyTrak Weather Network, which was carried on WALV-CD (channel 50, now on channel 46, where the service first launched in 2000) and simulcast on digital subchannel 13.2.

On December 14, 2011, the Dispatch Broadcast Group signed an agreement with MeTV to affiliate with WTHR; the station began carrying the classic television network on its second digital subchannel on January 1, 2012, replacing Universal Sports (which converted into a cable- and satellite-only network on that date). On January 25, 2013, WALV-CD/WTHR .2 affiliated with the classic television and lifestyle network Cozi TV replacing SkyTrak Weather Network.

For the 2016 Summer Olympics from August 8 to 19, some of WTHR's syndicated programming was moved to WALV and its other subchannel. By May 26, 2017, WALV-CD began broadcasting MeTV, which stayed on WTHR 13.3, dropping Cozi TV programming. However, Cozi was retained by WTHR.2.

Due to reception problems in parts of Central Indiana with its VHF digital signal (including in areas on the fringe of its Grade B coverage such as Bainbridge and Crawfordsville) that did not occur with stations broadcasting on the UHF band following the transition, WTHR filed a request with the FCC in June 2013 to increase its transmitter power to 77,000 watts, which would exceed the commission's maximum power limit in effect at the time.

On June 11, 2019, Dispatch announced it would sell its broadcasting assets, including WTHR and WALV-CD, to Tegna Inc. for $535 million in cash. It would make WTHR and WALV-CD sister stations to ABC affiliate WHAS-TV in adjacent Louisville and would also result in Tegna owning its first station in Indiana since its predecessor company, Gannett, sold off Fort Wayne's WPTA to the now-defunct Pulitzer, Inc. in May 1983. The sale was approved by the FCC on July 29, and was completed on August 8.

Until the start of 2024, WTHR broadcast the country network Circle on its sixth digital subchannel. When Circle switched from an OTA network to an ad-supported streaming channel, the 13.6 subchannel was deleted. The subchannel remained off the air for a month before it returned to the air with The Nest in February 2024.

On August 19, 2025, Nexstar Media Group agreed to acquire Tegna for $6.2 billion. In Indianapolis, Nexstar already owned WTTV and WXIN. The deal was approved and completed on March 19, 2026. As part of the transaction, Nexstar committed to the divestiture of WTHR within two years, along with five other stations, mostly in markets where the two companies combined held four TV station licenses. Combined with the March 31 sale of WRTV to WISH owner Circle City Broadcasting and the resulting consolidation of its operations, the "big four" network affiliates in Indianapolis are now controlled by only two companies.

== Programming ==
=== Sports programming ===
From the arrival of the Indianapolis Colts in 1984 until 1997, WTHR (through NBC's rights to AFC games) aired regular season games televised locally with WISH-TV (channel 8) from 1984 until 1993 (for select games televised by CBS in which the Colts play against an NFC opponent), with WRTV—until 2005—carrying non-preseason games via ABC's Monday Night Football on occasions when a game involving the Colts was scheduled.

Since 2006, regular season games currently televised over-the-air locally are split between WISH (from 1998 to 2014), and since 2015 WTTV (channel 4, through CBS' rights to the team's AFC affiliation), WXIN (channel 59, for select games televised by Fox in which the Colts play host to an NFC opponent at home since 1994, or since 2014, any games moved from WTTV via the new 'cross-flex' broadcast rules), with WTHR carrying non-preseason games and select Colts NFL games broadcast by NBC as part of the network's Sunday Night Football package. The station also acquired the local rights to two Colts regular season games during the 2013 season between the San Diego Chargers (on October 14, which aired on ESPN's Monday Night Football—whose Colts broadcasts are normally carried over-the-air by WNDY-TV (channel 23)) and the Tennessee Titans (on November 14, which aired on NFL Network's Thursday Night Football). WTHR also provided local coverage of Super Bowl XLVI, which was hosted at Lucas Oil Stadium.

From 2013 until 2016, WTHR served as an official sponsor of the Indiana Pacers and the Indiana Fever; the station displayed its on-court advertisements during all of the NBA and WNBA franchises' home games held at the Bankers Life Fieldhouse; these marked the only NBA and WNBA teams to be sponsored by an NBC-affiliated station following the loss of NBC's rights to the NBA for ABC and ESPN, and locally, WRTV in 2002. WTHR first carried Pacers games in 1990 when NBC acquired the NBA broadcast package, including the team's 2000 NBA Finals appearance, and will carry select games on Tuesday and Sunday nights through NBC's new NBA package beginning in the 2025–26 season. WTHR occasionally runs special editions of its newscasts or its highlight program Sports Jam to cover Pacers or Fever games.

Since 2023, WTHR carries any Purdue and Indiana University Big Ten college football games scheduled as part of the Big Ten Saturday Night package.

Beginning with the 2024 season, WTHR and WALV-CD became the local broadcast home of Indiana Fever women's basketball. Of the 17 games the two stations will air, 10 will be broadcast on WTHR. WTHR previously aired any Fever games as part of NBC's WNBA coverage from 1997 to 2002. In January 2025, the Indiana Pacers and FanDuel Sports Network Indiana announced an agreement to simulcast five games on WTHR.

==== Indianapolis 500 ====
With the transition of broadcast television rights to the Indianapolis 500 to NBC in 2019, WTHR replaced WRTV (which had carried the race since 1980) as the local broadcaster of the race, returning the race to WTHR for the first time since 1979 (when it was an ABC station). As per longstanding policies, the Indianapolis Motor Speedway required WTHR to black out the live broadcast locally to encourage residents and tourists to attend the race, though it allowed WTHR to air the race on tape delay that night. As WRTV did, NBC's prime time schedule and the race broadcast are transposed and air in reverse order, under a special dispensation from the network. However, speedway officials have stated they would allow a live broadcast on WTHR if the race sells out before race day. The 2020 race (delayed from its usual date) aired on WTHR on August 23 due to attendance restrictions put in place before August 4, when IMS owner Roger Penske announced there would be no public admission for any of the year's events due to a rise in COVID-19 cases in the state.

On May 27, 2021, IMS lifted the local blackout for the Indianapolis 500 for WTHR as all 135,000 tickets were sold. The event was restricted to 40% capacity to allow for social distancing. It would be the first time the race was televised live in Indianapolis in its entirety for two consecutive years (WRTV did the same thing in 1949 and 1950, but only aired parts of the race).

On May 26, 2024, at approximately 2:30 p.m. ET, IMS lifted the local blackout for the Indianapolis 500 for WTHR due to inclement weather causing a significant delay in the start of the race. It would be the fourth time in the history of the race that live flag-to-flag coverage was available within the Indianapolis area. This would also be the last Indy 500 broadcast on WTHR, as rights were sold to Fox Sports (locally via WXIN) beginning in 2025.

=== News operation ===
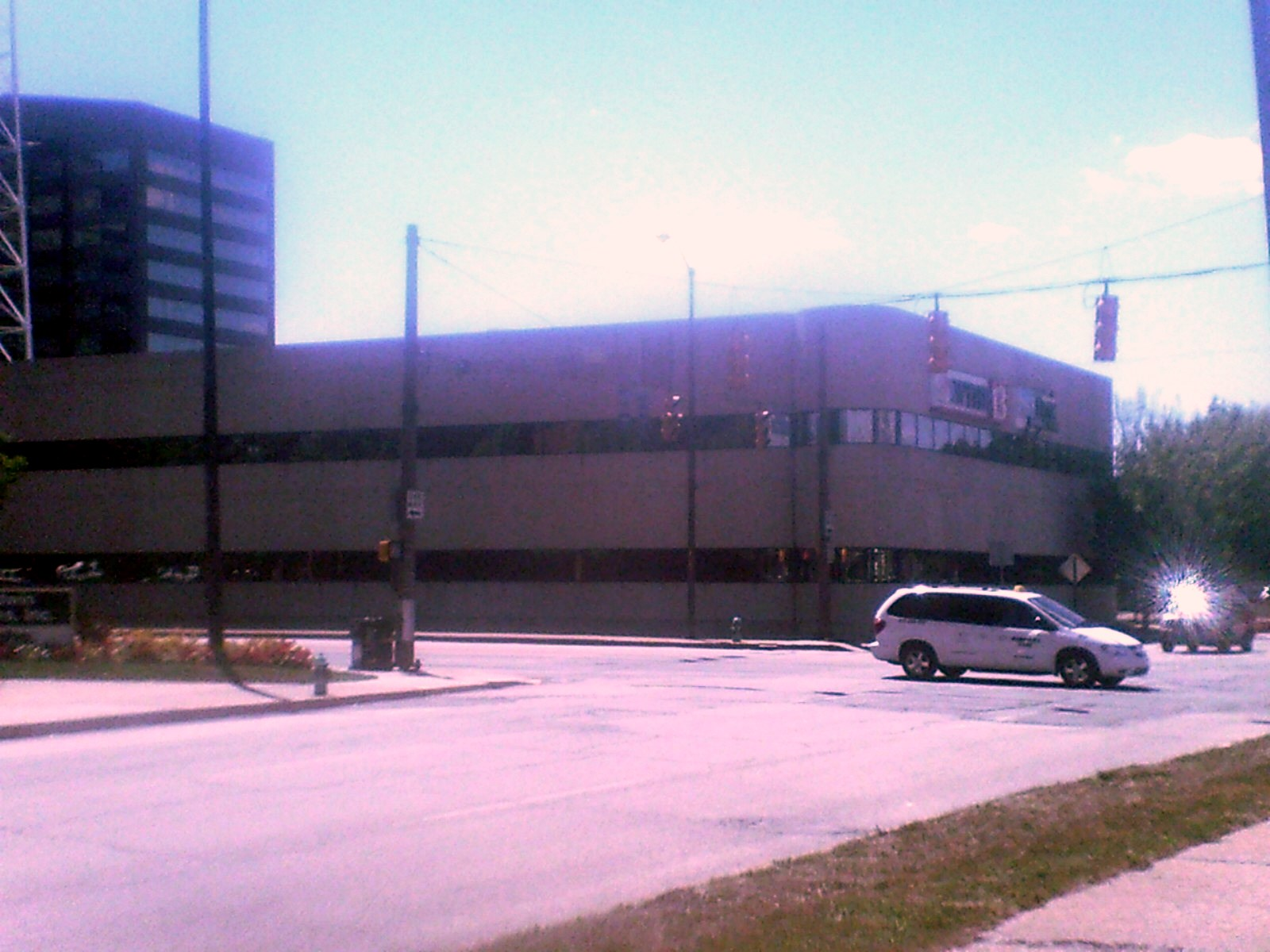
WTHR's studios in downtown Indianapolis.

WTHR presently broadcasts nearly 42 hours of locally produced newscasts each week (with seven hours each weekday, three hours on Saturdays and four hours on Sundays).

For most of its first four decades in the air, channel 13's newscasts had placed third in the ratings behind WISH and WRTV. The Wolfes made a large investment in the news department after taking over the station. Combined with NBC's prime time lineup as a lead-in, WTHR's ratings saw a modest uptick in the 1980s and early 1990s, but not enough to get it out of third place.

WTHR's newscasts surged to second place in 1996 after it hired former CBS News correspondent John Stehr as anchor of its evening newscasts around the same time that WRTV saw its ratings plummet following a botched format change. For the next three years, the station waged a pitched battle with then-dominant WISH for first place. In 1999, the station's Eyewitness News broadcasts surged past then-dominant WISH in several key timeslots, finishing in first place for the first time in its history. It eventually overtook WISH-TV for first in all news timeslots in 2002. The station's ratings lead—which WTHR emphasizes in the slogan it adopted upon taking first place full-time, "Indiana's News Leader"—began to narrow in 2010 as WISH-TV and Fox affiliate WXIN saw viewership gains that year as WTHR's ratings steadily decreased in certain timeslots, especially on weekday mornings. Despite decreased ratings for NBC's prime time schedule since the 2004–05 season, WTHR remains in a close battle with WISH for the #1 slot in the 11 p.m. timeslot.

As NBC affiliates in several larger markets switched network affiliations and/or dropped the Eyewitness News format over the past three decades, WTHR was the largest NBC affiliate to use the Eyewitness News brand continuously until March 25, 2020. This is based on the fact that the branding was originally synonymous with most ABC owned-and-operated stations, as well as stations owned by Westinghouse Broadcasting (or Group W) that were later acquired by CBS. The station first used the Eyewitness News format from 1969 to 1979 as an ABC affiliate (combining it with the NewsCenter format historically used by NBC stations) as Eyewitness NewsCenter 13 from 1976 to 1979, which utilized a format similar to that originated by CITY-TV in Toronto for its CityPulse newscasts) and was restored in 1995. The station debuted a weekday morning newscast titled Sunrise in September 1985; this was followed by the addition of two-hour weekend morning newscasts in 1993 (which were later retitled under the Weekend Sunrise banner), becoming the first station in the Indianapolis market to expand its morning newscasts to Saturdays and Sundays.

On March 16, 1996, WTHR began producing a nightly half-hour 10 p.m. newscast for UPN affiliate WNDY-TV (now a MyNetworkTV affiliate). The news share agreement with WNDY was terminated after that station was acquired by WISH-TV owner LIN TV Corporation in February 2005; on February 28 of that year, when WISH assumed production responsibilities for the WNDY newscast, WTHR began producing a 10 p.m. newscast for Pax TV owned-and-operated station WIPX-TV (channel 63, now an Ion Television O&O), which was cancelled five months later on June 30. In May 2005, the station added a 4:30 a.m. half-hour to the weekday edition of its Sunrise newscast (this predated morning news expansions into that timeslot by many other American television stations by a few years).

On November 12, 2006, beginning with the 11 p.m. newscast, WTHR became the first television station in Indiana to begin broadcasting its local newscasts in high definition. The station's news set at the time, which was built in 1997 with an eventual conversion to HD broadcasts in mind, underwent a refresh as part of the upgrade. Much of WTHR's field video continued to be shot in pillarboxed 4:3 standard definition until October 2, 2007, when all video recorded and broadcast live outside the studio began to be broadcast in widescreen; video recorded by the station's news crews is shot, edited and broadcast in the 1080i resolution.

In June 2011, WTHR began offering newscast segments for free streaming on the Roku digital video player. On February 24, 2014, the station expanded its weekday morning newscast by a half-hour to 4 a.m. On June 23, 2014, The Indianapolis Star announced that it would end its content partnership with WTHR, and enter into a new content agreement with Fox affiliate WXIN beginning on August 1.

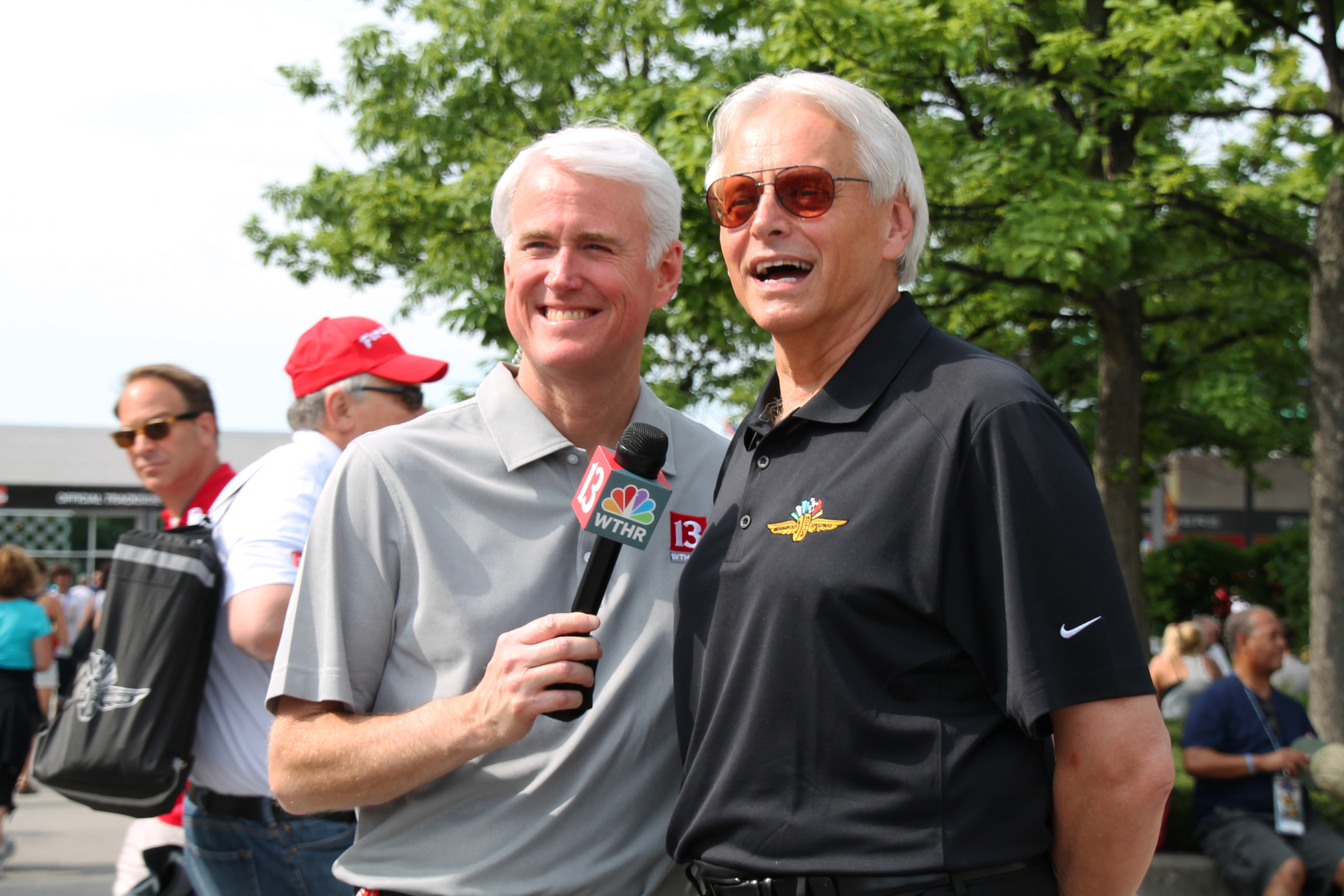
Reporter Scott Swan interviewing Conley Stamper at the 2015 Indianapolis 500

On March 25, 2020, WTHR adopted Tegna's standardized news graphics and "C Clarity" theme, seven months after Tegna acquired the station, now as 13 News.

==== Awards and honors ====
WTHR has received national honors for its news reporting over the years, including Peabody Awards for two 2006 reports, "Cause for Alarm" (an investigation into faulty tornado sirens in Indiana) and "Prescription Privacy" (an investigation of improper disposal of personal pharmacy records); WTHR also earned a third Peabody for 2010's "Reality Check: Where Are the Jobs?", which revealed grossly exaggerated job creation claims made by the Indiana Economic Development Corporation. "Investigating the IRS", an investigative series which exposed how illegal immigrants fraudulently received billions of dollars in tax refunds and the IRS's failure to stop it once the fraud was discovered, earned WTHR a fourth national Peabody Award in 2013. "Charity Caught on Camera", a report on corruption at a local nonprofit, and "Dangerous Exposure", a report on how lax agency oversight allowed companies to leak poison into groundwater in residential areas, won the station two Peabody awards in 2016.

The station earned two national Edward R. Murrow Awards from the Radio-Television News Directors Association (RTNDA) in 2011, in the "Overall Excellence" and "Investigative Series" categories. In 2012, WTHR earned two Murrow Awards for its breaking news coverage of the Indiana State Fair stage collapse and in the spot news category, which was given to WTHR videographer Steve Rhodes.

==== Notable current on-air staff ====
- Anne Marie Tiernon – weeknights

==== Notable former on-air staff ====
- Don Hein - sports anchor (deceased)
- Ross Becker – anchor/reporter
- Mary Ann Childers – anchor/reporter
- Carol Costello – reporter
- Linsey Davis – weekend anchor/reporter
- Gerry Dick – Inside Indiana Business host and moderator
- Jerry Harkness – sports anchor (1970s) (deceased)
- Bill Jackson – host of the Mickey Mouse Club, later renamed The Bill Jackson Show (1963–1965) (deceased)
- Dick Johnson – reporter (deceased)
- David Letterman – weekend weatherman/host of Freeze Dried Theater and Clover Power
- Paul Page – sports anchor/reporter
- John Stehr – weeknights (1995–2018)
- Meshach Taylor (as Bruce Taylor) – actor and former star of Designing Women, hosted a community-affairs program on WLWI in the 1970s (deceased)
- Henry Wofford – sports anchor/reporter (2005–2010)

== Subchannels ==
The station's signal is multiplexed:

Subchannels of WTHR
Subchannel	Res.	Short name	Programming
13.1	1080i	WTHR-HD	NBC
13.2	480i	QUEST	Quest
13.3	480i	Me-TV	MeTV (WALV-CD)
13.4	480i	Crime	True Crime Network
13.5	480i	TBD	Outlaw (soon)
13.6	480i	NEST	The Nest

Simulcast of subchannels of another station
