= Hoosier Millionaire =

American television program

- Season 16 title card
- Presented by: Mark Patrick (1989–2003); Barbara Hobbs (1989–2003); Cody Stark (2003–2005); Catt Sadler (2003–2005); Tony Lamont (2004–2005)
- Narrated by: Tony Lamont (1989–2004)
- Country of origin: United States
- No. of seasons: 16
- No. of episodes: 780

Production
- Running time: 30 minutes

Original release
- Network: WTTV (1989–1996); WNDY-TV (1996–2000); WTTV (2000–2003); WXIN (2003–2005) {Indiana only
- Release: October 28, 1989 – November 19, 2005

Hoosier Millionaire is an American television lottery game show which aired on television stations in Indiana, Illinois and Kentucky from October 28, 1989, to November 19, 2005. At its peak, it was among the highest-rated lottery game shows in the United States and one of the highest-rated television programs in Indiana.

== Original rules ==
Six contestants faced a board of 30 numbers and played three rounds, with each contestant choosing one number per round. Two numbers hid bonus prizes (most commonly 5,000 Hoosier Lottery scratch-off tickets and a trip sponsored by ATA Airlines), while the others hid cash amounts from $1,000 to $10,000 (the typical layout in the 1990s was ten $1000s, six $2000s, four $3,000s, two $4,000s, one each of $5000-$10,000, Doubler, Tickets). In the mid-1990s, a "Doubler" was hidden behind one square and would double the amount of the contestant's next pick. Contestants kept whatever cash and prizes they found; uncovering a bonus prize did not affect a contestant's cash total, but did allow him/her to choose again on that turn.

Only the two highest scorers after the third round advanced to a playoff, with the other four being eliminated. The lower scorer of the two chose a number first; if the value behind it was not enough to put him/her in the lead, the high scorer won immediately. If it was, the high scorer then chose a number in an attempt to retake the lead and the contestant with the higher total advanced to the bonus round. If the scores were tied after both had chosen, additional rounds were played until the tie was broken.

== Bonus round ==
Version 1 (1989–1990): The winning contestant is presented a board with four numbers. Behind each number are three green dollar signs and a red "no dollar sign" (called the "Stopper"). Picking the first dollar sign won the contestant $50,000. The contestant could then stop and take the $50,000 or risk it for a try at the second green dollar sign. Picking the second dollar sign earned the contestant $100,000. The contestant could then risk it by picking from the two remaining numbers; picking the third dollar sign won the contestant the $1,000,000 grand prize. Picking the Stopper symbol would lose the $50,000/$100,000 risked, but the contestant still keeps all money earned in the regular game as well as receiving a stack of free Hoosier Lottery scratch-off game tickets.

Version 2 (1990–2000): Same as version 1, but the three green dollar signs were replaced by $50,000, $100,000, and $1,000,000 symbols. This meant that the contestant could now win $1,000,000 on the first selection. In the mid-1990s, the two smaller prizes were increased to $150,000 and $200,000. Also, the contestant was presented with a glass case of $100,000 cash that they could take and forget about the bonus round game (again, by hitting the red stop button to stop or green button to go on) or risk it for one of the bigger cash prizes. Again, picking the Stopper symbol (which was changed by this point to a matching exploding graphic like the cash prizes) lost all bonus round money but the contestant still kept whatever was earned in the regular game. It was also by this point that the contestant was presented his/her winnings with a big check; previously only those who won the $1,000,000 grand prize was presented with the big check at the end.

Version 3 (2000–2005): The contestant with the highest dollar amount advanced to a Bonus Round with sixteen squares. The player could reveal cash or prizes with values far less than $1 million. That player would advance to the Hoosier Millionaire Hysteria episode at the end of the season, where a $1 million prize would be awarded. However, the Hysteria episode format was unrelated to the regular show: rather than unveiling dollar amounts, the Hysteria board had basketball goals which revealed two or three points, a turnover, or a foul. The player with the fewest points was eliminated from the tournament bracket. Eventually one person was left to win the million.

== 25th Anniversary Show ==
To celebrate the show's 25th anniversary, a special episode featuring past winners and the original on-air team of Patrick, Hobbs and Lamont was filmed, but not aired on television, at the Indiana State Fair on August 16, 2014, and later uploaded to the Indiana Lottery's YouTube channel. The set was manually operated, with the hostess pulling up pull-cards (instead of turning trilons), and the host turned flip-cards with numbers to show the totals. The bonus round player had two stop signs; a red sign with the word "STOP" and a green sign with the word "GO."

== Broadcast history ==
The game show began on WTTV/WTTK (Channel 4/29) in Indianapolis/Bloomington/Kokomo. Other stations airing the show on a statewide network upon the program's debut included:

- WLFI (18) - Lafayette
- WKJG (33) - Ft. Wayne
- WNDU (16) - South Bend
- WTWO (2) - Terre Haute
- WFIE (14) - Evansville
- WGBO (66) - Joliet, Illinois/Chicago/Gary
- WDRB (41) - Louisville, Kentucky/New Albany/Jeffersonville

With Marion-licensed WNDY (Channel 23) trying to establish itself in Indianapolis, and with the new ownership of Indianapolis Motor Speedway owner Tony George, WNDY won a bidding war to take over production from WTTV starting February 1, 1996. Coinciding with the shift, there were a few changes in the statewide network:

- WSBT (22) - South Bend
- WFFT (55) - Ft. Wayne
- WTHI (10) - Terre Haute
- WTVW (7) - Evansville
- WJYS (62) - Hammond/Chicago/Gary
- WFTE (58) - Salem/Louisville/New Albany/Jeffersonville

WLFI continued to carry the show in Lafayette, while the show moved in the Chicago market due to WGBO's conversion to an owned-and-operated station of the Spanish-language Univision network.

During the 1990s, the show was sponsored by Long John Silver's, with their logo on top of the main gameboard. In addition, the show would also spotlight a "Hoosier Lottery retailer of the week" at the end of the show; in the early 1990s they would also spotlight an "[Indiana] county of the week".

Four years later, a new format called "The New Hoosier Millionaire" premiered in January 2000; production returned to WTTV, with lottery management citing its increased cable carriage. The budget was essentially cut, with the $1,000,000 grand prize available every 13 weeks instead of on every show. The set became a black room with contestant podiums and a game board. The lowest dollar amount on the regular game board was increased to $2,000. More changes to the statewide network occurred:

- WPTA (21) - Ft. Wayne
- WTSN-LP (41) - Evansville
- WKEF (22) - Dayton, Ohio/Richmond

In June 2003, a whole new format emerged, and Tribune Broadcasting took over productions with their purchase of WTTV/WTTK from Sinclair Broadcast Group in 2003 to form a station duopoly in Indianapolis. The new management forced out Mark Patrick and Barbara Hobbs. Cody Stark and Catt Sadler, who were part of WXIN's "Fox 59 Morning News", took over hosting duties, and the program immediately moved to the higher-rated station. WKEF (a Sinclair station and WTTV's sister station before the WTTV/WTTK sale) dropped the program with no other Dayton/Eastern Indiana station taking its place, while in the Chicago area, the program moved to PBS member station WYIN (Channel 56, Gary), one of the few times a lottery game show has aired over a public television station, and WEVV (Channel 44) aired the show in Evansville. Ratings declined for two more years until Hoosier Millionaire's cancellation early in its sixteenth season in the fall of 2005. The lottery had experienced seven consecutive years of declining ticket sales, from $45 million in 2001 to $20 million in 2005.

== See also ==
- Hoosier Lottery
