= Brownsburg High School =

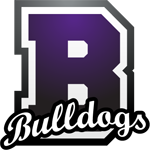

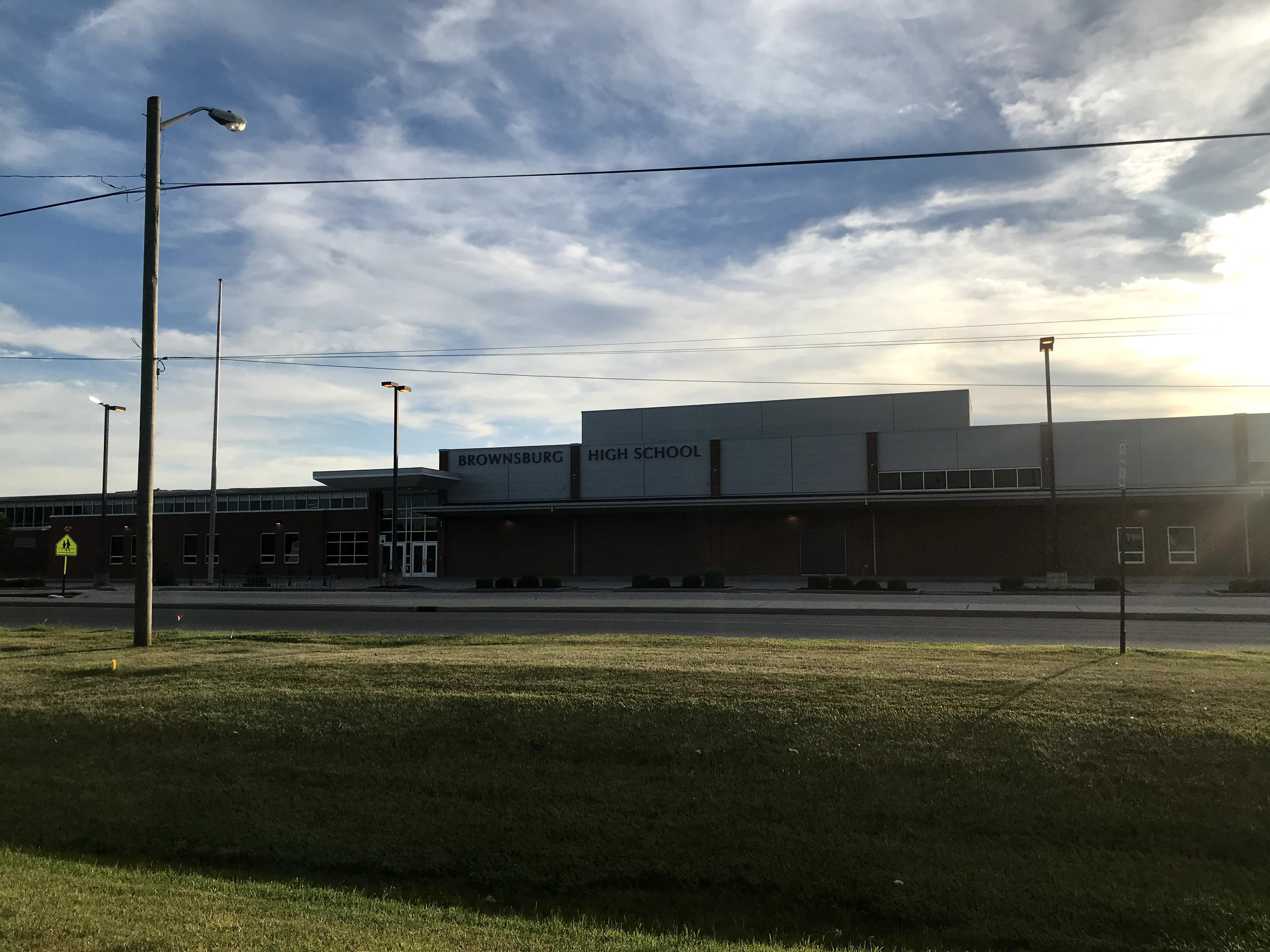

Location
- 1000 S Odell Street; Brownsburg, Indiana; United States; 39°49′47″N 86°23′17″W

Information
- Type: Public high school
- School district: Brownsburg Community School Corporation
- Principal: Tom Balitewicz
- Teaching staff: 172.33 (FTE)
- Grades: 9–12
- Enrollment: 3,355 (2024–2025)
- Student to teacher ratio: 19.47
- Colors: Purple and white
- Athletics conference: Hoosier Crossroads Conference
- Nickname: Bulldogs
- Website: bhs.brownsburg.k12.in.us

Brownsburg High School is a public high school located in Brownsburg, Indiana. The school is located within the Brownsburg Community School Corporation, which is in Hendricks County.

The district includes the majority of Brownsburg and small portions of Avon.

== History ==
Brownsburg graduated its first class in spring 1897. BHS has completed a series of renovations in the last decade, by modernizing the main building and facilities such as the auditorium from 2016 to 2020, and is currently renovating and expanding its Senior Academy, renovating its varsity gymnasium and pool, and constructing a new field house building through 2026.

== Athletics ==
BHS athletic teams are nicknamed the Bulldogs and compete in the Hoosier Crossroads Conference. In 2020, it was announced that the Bulldogs received a uniform partnership with Jordan brand.

State Championships
Sport	Year(s)
Baseball (1)	2005
Basketball (1)	2008
Bowling (1)	2009
Football (4)	1984, 1985, 2024, 2025
Unified Flag Football (1)	2022
Wrestling (7)	2017, 2018, 2020, 2021, 2022, 2024, 2025

== Performing arts ==
BHS fields four competitive show choirs: the mixed-gender "Spotlight Singers & Company", the all-female "Starlight Voices" and "Bella Voce", and the all-male "Dog Pound". The program also hosts an annual competition, the Bulldog Spectacular. BHS also has a top 10-ranking marching band: “The Sound of Brownsburg”. They have ranked 5th in the state of Indiana and 2nd at the Bands of America Bowling Green Regional competition. In 2021 they placed 1st at the NorthWest Regional Competition in Toledo, Ohio. They were also one of 10 bands invited to perform in the 95th Macy's Thanksgiving Day Parade. In their 2022 season, they made Bands of America Grand National finals for the first time in school history, placing 8th at that event. They also placed 4th in the state of Indiana, making it their highest placement in school history. In October 2024, the band announced it would be performing in the 137th Rose Parade in 2026.

== Notable alumni ==
- Mark Patrick (1977) - radio personality
- Lance Lynn (2005) - Major League Baseball All Star pitcher
- Mark Titus (2006) - sports media personality
- Drew Storen (2007) - Major League Baseball pitcher
- Chris Estridge (2008) - professional soccer player
- Gordon Hayward (2008) - NBA All Star
- Julian Mavunga (2008) - professional basketball player who played overseas
- Tucker Barnhart (2009) - Major League Baseball Gold Glove catcher
- Chris Jones (2009) - National Football League player
- Kyle Christy (2010) - football player
- Nicko Calderon (2012) - Knocked Loose rhythm guitar and vocals
- Stephanie Mavunga (2013) - WNBA player
- Hunter Johnson (2017) - former college football quarterback
- Ally Becki (2021) - basketball player for the Ball State Cardinals
- Kanon Catchings (2024 - transferred) - basketball player for the BYU Cougars

== See also ==
- List of high schools in Indiana
