= Kristen Ashley =

American author (born 1968)

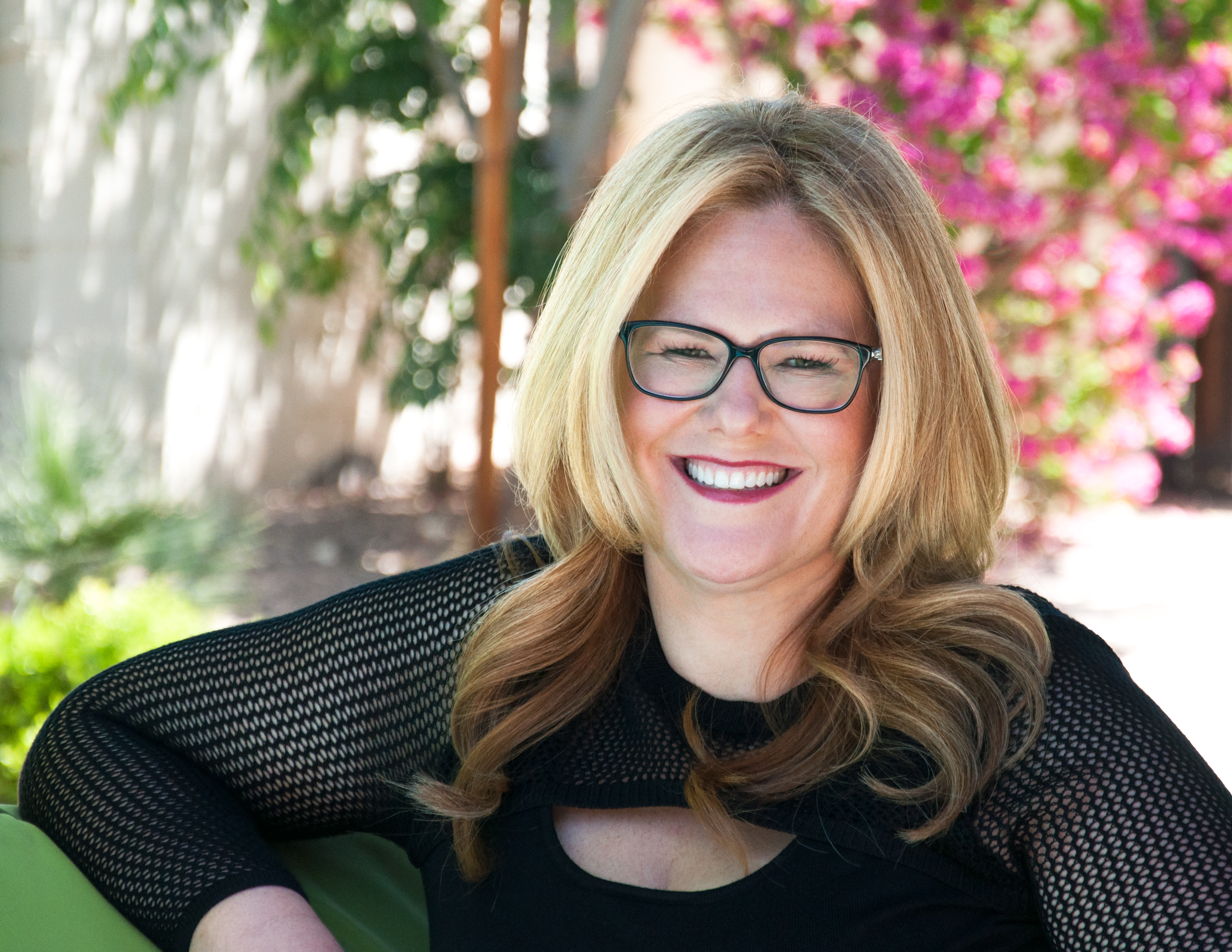
- Born: Kristen A L Moutaw; April 8, 1968 (age 58); Gary, Indiana, U.S.
- Education: Purdue University
- Occupation: Novelist
- Spouse: David Mark Ashley (m. 2003; div. 2013)
- Writing career
- Period: 2008-present
- Genres: Romance, Fantasy, Erotica, Paranormal
- Website: www.kristenashley.net

Kristen Ashley (born Kristen A L Moutaw; April 8, 1968) is a New York Times and USA Today bestselling author of 100 books in 14 languages, with over three million copies sold. Two of her novels have been adapted into film.

== Career ==
Ashley began writing books while working in the medical field at the Rocky Mountain MS Center, the Colorado Neurological Institute, and at The Pituitary Foundation in Bristol, England. She has authored 100 romance novels.

In 2013, Ashley signed her first traditional publishing contract, with Grand Central Publishing's Forever line. As of 2019, she had released three series of books through traditional publishing.

Passionflix purchased the film rights to several of Ashley's novels. The Will, based on Ashley's novel of the same name, was released on February 14, 2020. In 2020, Passionflix was scheduled to film an adaptation of Ashleys' "Three Wishes".

As of 2019, Ashley had published more than 60 novels, which have been translated into 14 languages and sold a combined three million copies.

== Reception ==
Her novel, Raid, was on the USA Today bestseller list. Own the Wind placed on the New York Times bestseller list. She won the Romantic Times Book Reviews Reviewer's Choice Award for Best Romantic Suspense for Law Man and the Romance Reviews Reader's Choice Award for Ride Steady. She was nominated for Romantic Times awards for Best Independent Contemporary Romance (Hold On) and Best Contemporary Romance (Breathe). Four of her novels (Motorcycle Man, The Will, Ride Steady, and The Hookup) have been finalists for Goodreads Choice Awards in the Romance category.

== Writing ==
As influences, Ashley cites Janet Evanovich, Judith McNaught, J. K. Rowling, and Carl Hiaasen.

Ashley struggled with sleep due to an active mind, which she turned to creating stories that she continued developing over time. Her heroes are often Alpha males with the heroine bringing a strong character to match them. Her heroines run the gamut from independent women who run their own businesses to more traditional women whose utmost goal is to become a mother. Family, friends, and music are recurring thematic elements. She claims that she does not tone down or restrict her characters into the typical hero and heroines found in romance novels, this being part of the reason for rejections by traditional publishers. She has written racially diverse characters, as well as LGBTQ characters.
