= Arthur W Graham III =

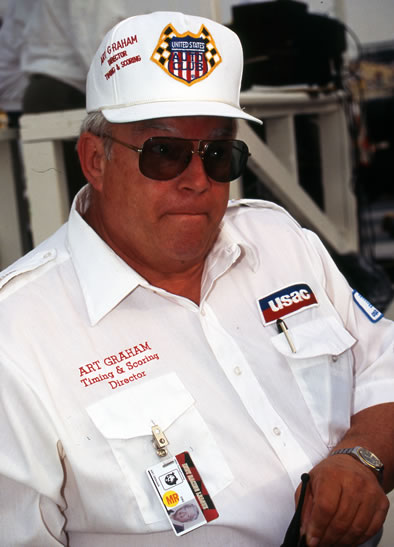
Art Graham at the Indianapolis 500

Arthur "Art" W. Graham III (November 20, 1940 - May 12, 2008) was the Director of Timing and Scoring for the Indianapolis 500 from 1978 to 1998.

A native of Columbus, IN, but a longtime resident of Cincinnati, OH and then Brownsburg, IN, Graham designed and implemented the first fully automated electronic race timing and scoring system and introduced many of the timing-and-scoring innovations now used in American and International open-wheel racing.

Graham was also a Computer Engineer for IBM from 1962 to 1992, overseeing the PC Divisions unprecedented growth in home computers. His dual roles with IBM and the Indianapolis 500 led to a partnership between "Big Blue" and USAC that enabled innovations not seen in other Motorsports.

== Indy Racing League ==
A lifelong racing enthusiast who recalled watching the first live television coverage of the "500" in 1949 on a tiny screen through an appliance store window, Graham first became involved with the United States Auto Club in 1965 while living in Cincinnati. It was not long before he was serving on USAC's competition commissions, eventually becoming Chairman of the Rules Committee. In 1982, he was named to USAC's Board of Directors, remaining there until 1997 as the Director of Corporate Development.

Computers were used at the Indianapolis 500 when Graham first came onto the scene, but he revolutionized their use for timing and scoring procedures. He designed and installed the first automated system that tracked and communicated drivers' positions and speed in real time. It simultaneously displayed race leaders and laps on the leaderboard. Using proprietary in-track antenna loops and on-car position transponders, the information was automatically fed to live TV broadcasts, thereby enabling viewers to follow the race and position of their favorite drivers.

In the decades prior to these innovations, it was traditional for an all-night audit of individual manual scoring sheets and DOS-based computers to verify race results, with the results not being officially posted until the following day. By the late 1980s, under Graham's leadership, they were posted within an hour of the race's conclusion. Graham has been recognized as the "Father of Autosport Timing Technology.”

In the early 1990s, Graham began championing the cause of the National Midget Auto Racing Hall of Fame, and later served for several years as the organization's Secretary.

== Interests ==
Likes big-band music, Graham was the Indiana representative of the Four Freshmen Society. Graham was also a member of the Sigma Alpha Epsilon fraternity at Purdue University (Indiana Beta ’62 chapter).

== Family ==
Graham's family includes wife Dina, daughter Susan L. Moore, sons Daniel A. and Matthew S. Graham, brother Andrew S. Graham, mother Martha S. Graham, and four grandchildren, Sydney, Reagan, Taylo, and Kyle.
