= Brown Township, Hendricks County, Indiana =

Brown Township
- Township
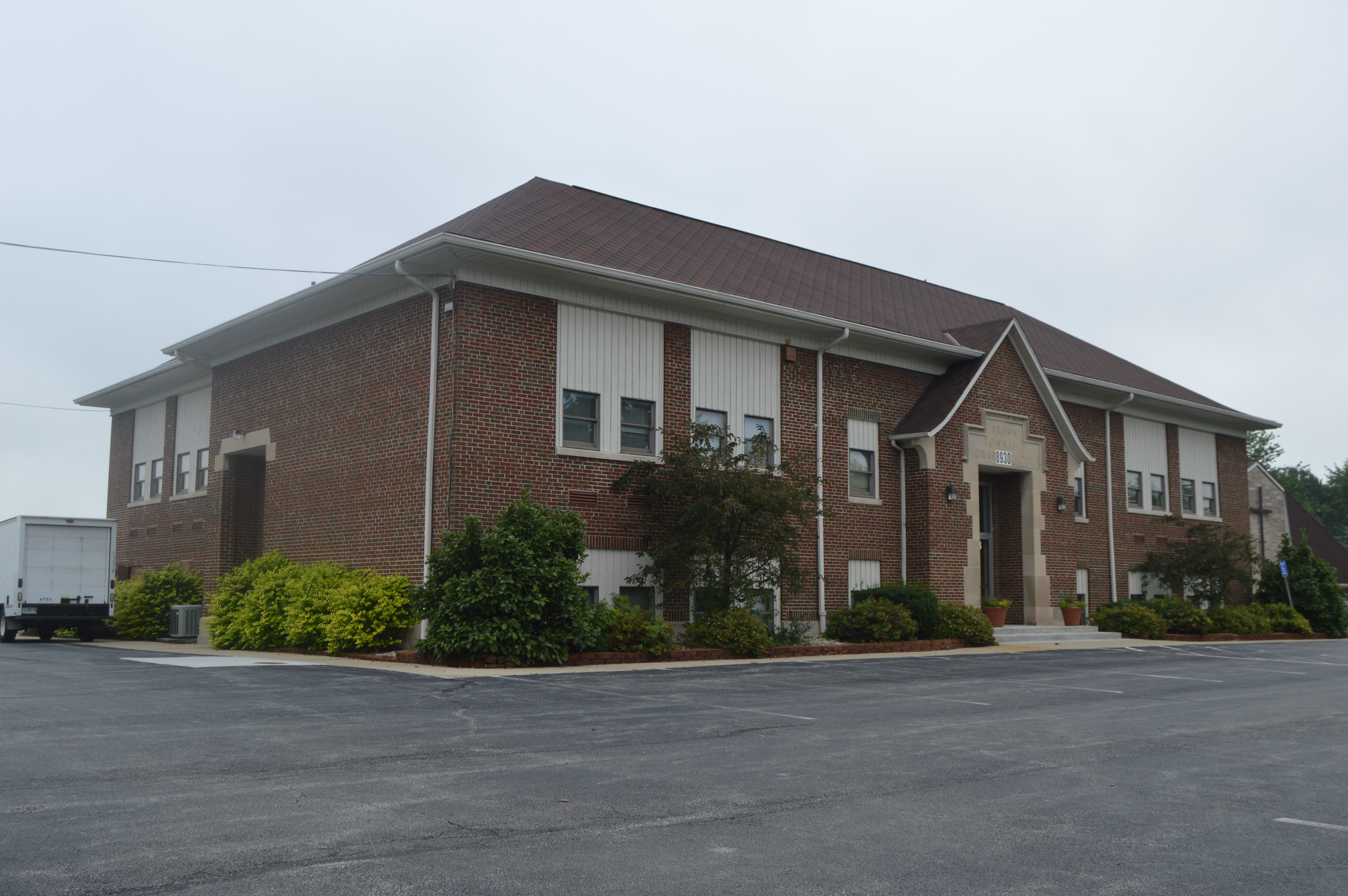
- Former township elementary school on State Road 267

- Location in Hendricks County
- Coordinates: 39°53′17″N 86°22′45″W
- Country: United States
- State: Indiana
- County: Hendricks

Government
  - Type: Indiana township

Area
  - Total: 25.35 sq mi (65.65 km^{2})
  - Land: 25.32 sq mi (65.58 km^{2})
  - Water: 0.031 sq mi (0.08 km^{2}) 0.12%
- Elevation: 909 ft (277 m)

Population (2020)
  - Total: 14,316
  - Density: 458/sq mi (176.8/km^{2})
- Time zone: UTC-5 (Eastern (EST))
  - Summer (DST): UTC-4 (EDT)
- GNIS feature ID: 453138
- Website: browntownship.org

Brown Township is one of twelve townships in Hendricks County, Indiana, United States. As of the 2010 census, its population was 11,593.

== History ==
Brown Township was named for James Brown, a pioneer settler.

== Geography ==
Brown Township covers an area of 25.35 square miles (65.7 km^{2}); of this, 0.03 square miles (0.078 km^{2}) or 0.12 percent is water. The stream of Pump Run flows through this township.

=== Cities and towns ===
- Brownsburg (north quarter)

=== Adjacent townships ===
- Eagle Township, Boone County (northeast)
- Pike Township, Marion County (east)
- Lincoln Township (south)
- Middle Township (west)
- Perry Township, Boone County (northwest)

=== Cemeteries ===
The township contains eight cemeteries: Ballard, Bethesda, Evans, Johnson, Macedonia, Marvel, Smith-Shepherd and Sparks.

=== Major highways ===
- Interstate 65
- Interstate 74
- Indiana State Road 267

=== Airports and landing strips ===
- Fuller Field

== Education ==
It is within the Brownsburg Community School Corporation.

Brown Township residents may obtain a free library card from the Brownsburg Public Library in Brownsburg.
