= Brownsburg, Indiana =

- Town
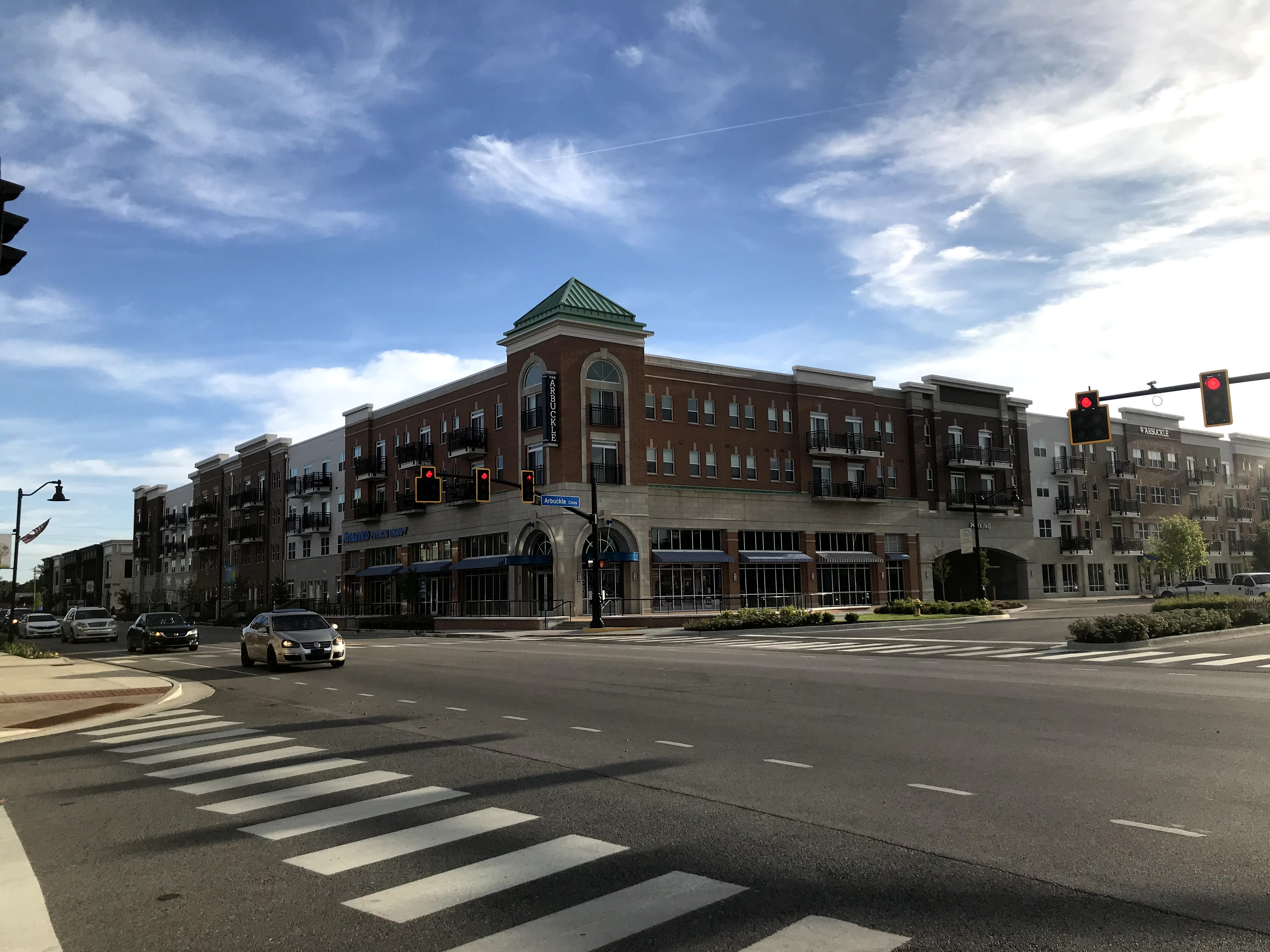
- North Green Street

- Flag Logo
- Nicknames: bburg
- Motto: "Community on the Move"
- Location of Brownsburg in Hendricks County, Indiana.
- Coordinates: 39°50′31″N 86°23′04″W
- Country: United States
- State: Indiana
- County: Hendricks
- Townships: Lincoln, Brown, Middle, Washington
- Settled: 1824
- Founded: 1835
- Incorporated: 1848 (first time); 1870 (second time)
- Named for: James B. Brown

Government
  - Town Council President: Ben Lacey
  - Vice-president: Matt Simpson

Area
  - Total: 16.36 sq mi (42.36 km^{2})
  - Land: 16.27 sq mi (42.13 km^{2})
  - Water: 0.085 sq mi (0.22 km^{2})
- Elevation: 879 ft (268 m)

Population (2020)
  - Total: 28,973
  - Density: 1,781.0/sq mi (687.63/km^{2})
- Time zone: UTC-5 (EST)
  - Summer (DST): UTC-4 (EDT)
- ZIP code: 46112
- Area code: 317
- FIPS code: 18-08416
- GNIS feature ID: 2396611
- Website: www.brownsburg.org

Brownsburg is a town in Hendricks County, Indiana, United States. In the 2020 census, the population was recorded as 28,973 residents.

== History ==
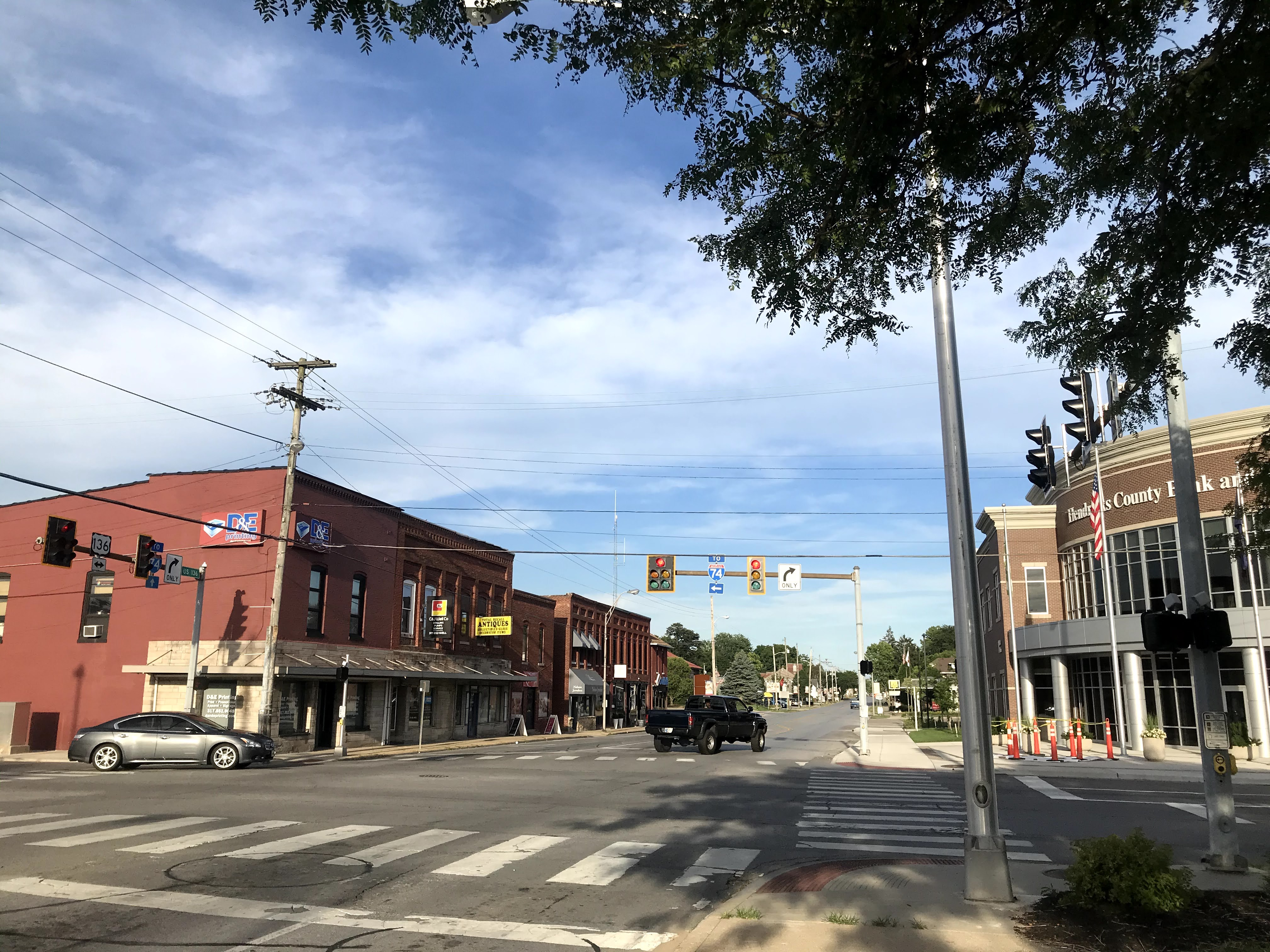
Looking east on Main Street

Brownsburg was first settled in 1824 by James B. Brown. Delaware Indians lived in what is now called Lincoln Township, along White Lick Creek, which was then called "Wa-pe-ke-way" or "White Salt".

Four years later, the first log schoolhouse was built in Brown Township. Brown and additional settlers arrived once a stagecoach line was established along a road built in 1820 connecting to Indianapolis. William Harris settled in the area north of what is now Main Street, selling sections of woods to incoming pioneers. This gave the town its original name of Harrisburgh in 1835. A post office was established in 1836 under the name of Harrisburgh but was later changed to Brownsburg, since the name Harrisburgh was being used by a post office in another Indiana county.

From 1840 to 1870, Brownsburg tripled in size, increased from six to sixteen acres, and added its first church. The town was incorporated in 1848, however it soon dissolved due to struggles relating to the American Civil War. In 1863, it was divided into Brown Township and Lincoln Township.

Brownsburg incorporated a second time in 1870, this time permanently.

In 1985, part of the movie Hoosiers was filmed in the former College Avenue Gym.

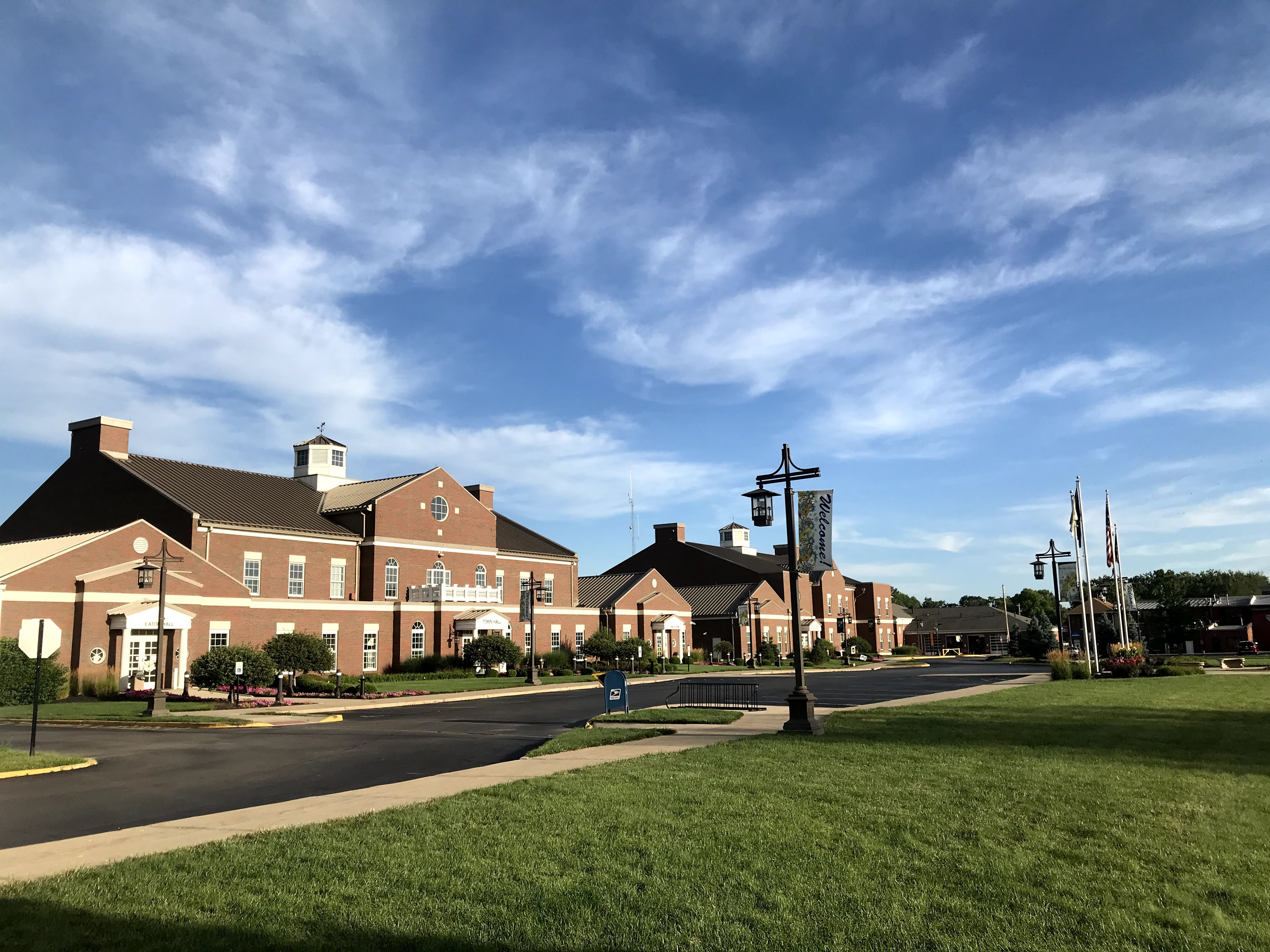
Brownsburg Town Hall and Police Station

== Geography ==
According to the 2010 census, Brownsburg has a total area of 11.16 square miles (28.90 km^{2}), of which 11.08 square miles (28.70 km^{2}) (or 99.28%) is land and 0.08 square miles (0.21 km^{2}) (or 0.72%) is water. White Lick Creek, a tributary of the White River, flows from north to south through the town, passing just west of the town center.

== Demographics ==
Historical population
Census	Pop.	Note	%±
1850	132		—
1870	551		—
1880	667		21.1%
1890	623		−6.6%
1900	676		8.5%
1910	876		29.6%
1920	1,063		21.3%
1930	1,042		−2.0%
1940	1,136		9.0%
1950	1,578		38.9%
1960	4,478		183.8%
1970	5,751		28.4%
1980	6,242		8.5%
1990	7,628		22.2%
2000	14,520		90.4%
2010	21,285		46.6%
2020	28,973		36.1%
Source: US Census Bureau

=== 2020 census ===
As of the 2020 census, Brownsburg had a population of 28,973. The median age was 36.8 years. 27.7% of residents were under the age of 18 and 13.9% of residents were 65 years of age or older. For every 100 females there were 92.4 males, and for every 100 females age 18 and over there were 87.6 males age 18 and over.

99.9% of residents lived in urban areas, while 0.1% lived in rural areas.

There were 10,844 households in Brownsburg, of which 39.4% had children under the age of 18 living in them. Of all households, 54.9% were married-couple households, 13.8% were households with a male householder and no spouse or partner present, and 25.6% were households with a female householder and no spouse or partner present. About 24.0% of all households were made up of individuals and 10.0% had someone living alone who was 65 years of age or older.

There were 11,370 housing units, of which 4.6% were vacant. The homeowner vacancy rate was 0.7% and the rental vacancy rate was 9.6%.

Racial composition as of the 2020 census
Race	Number	Percent
White	23,774	82.1%
Black or African American	1,900	6.6%
American Indian and Alaska Native	58	0.2%
Asian	750	2.6%
Native Hawaiian and Other Pacific Islander	25	0.1%
Some other race	536	1.8%
Two or more races	1,930	6.7%
Hispanic or Latino (of any race)	1,396	4.8%

=== 2010 census ===
At the 2010 census there were 21,285 people, 7,948 households, and 5,816 families in the town. The population density was 1,921.0 inhabitants per square mile (741.7/km^{2}). There were 8,376 housing units at an average density of 756.0 per square mile (291.9/km^{2}). The racial makeup of the town was 93.4% White, 2.2% African American, 0.1% Native American, 1.6% Asian, 0.1% Pacific Islander, 1.2% from other races, and 1.4% from two or more races. Hispanic or Latino of any race were 3.0%.

Of the 7,948 households, 40.9% had children under the age of 18 living with them, 58.7% were married couples living together, 10.5% had a female householder with no husband present, 4.0% had a male householder with no wife present, and 26.8% were non-families. 22.4% of households were one person and 8.5% were one person aged 65 or older. The average household size was 2.64 and the average family size was 3.11.

The median age in the town was 36 years. 28.4% of residents were under the age of 18; 6.8% were between the ages of 18 and 24; 28.8% were from 25 to 44; 24.1% were from 45 to 64, and 12% were 65 or older. The gender makeup of the town was 48.0% male and 52.0% female.

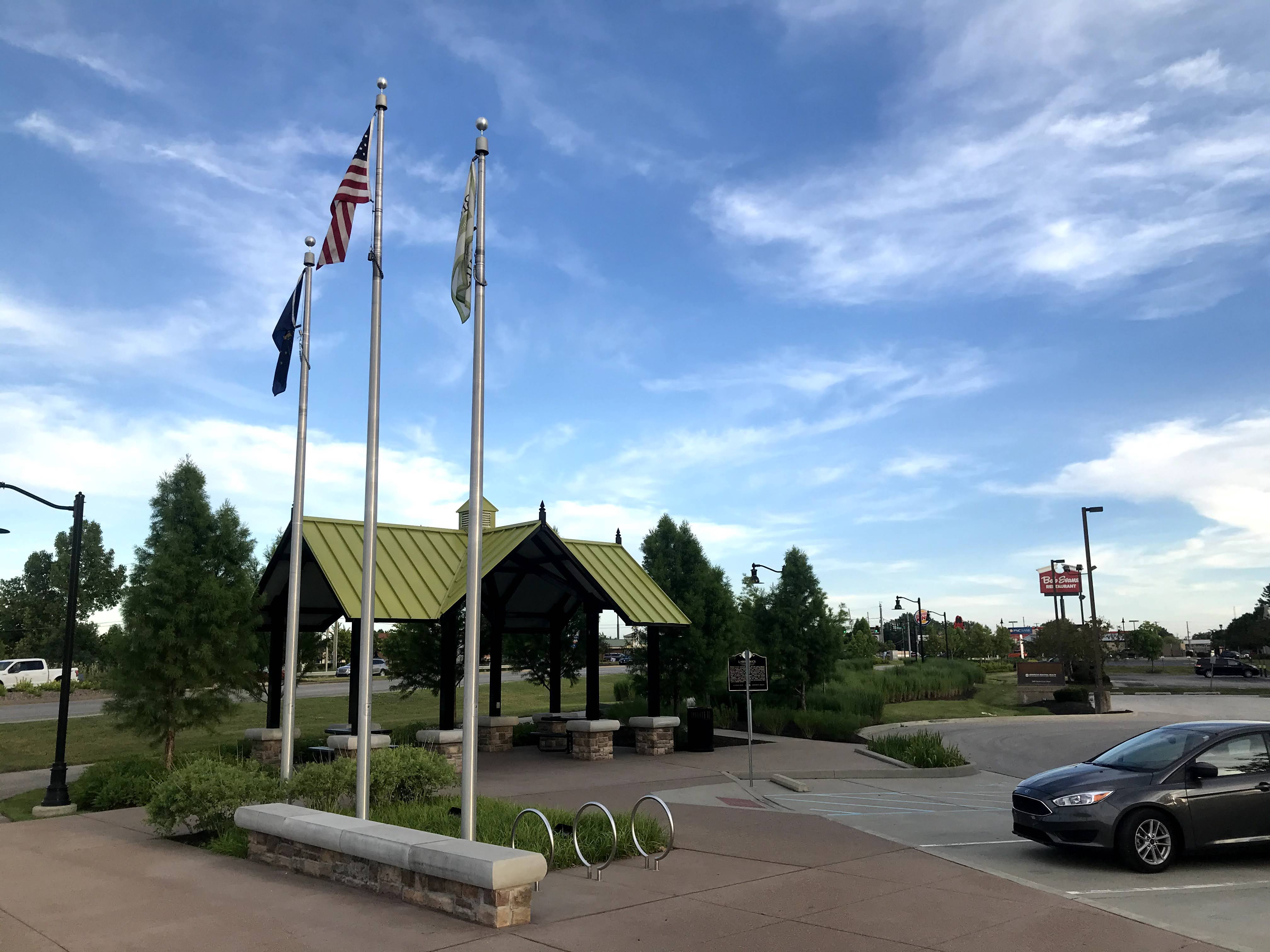
Gateway and trailhead at N. Green Street

=== 2000 census ===
At the 2000 census, there were 14,520 people, & 5,366 households residing in the town. The population density was 1,983.5 inhabitants per square mile (765.8/km^{2}). There were 5,574 housing units at an average density of 761.4 per square mile (294.0/km^{2}). The racial makeup of the town was 97.44% White, 0.32% African American, 0.17% Native American, 0.78% Asian, 0.08% Pacific Islander, 0.35% from other races, and 0.86% from two or more races. Hispanic or Latino of any race were 1.18%. Of the 5,366 households, 41.8% had children under the age of 18 living with them, 64.0% were married couples living together, 8.6% had a female householder with no husband present, and 24.6% were non-families. 20.8% of households were one person and 8.2% were one person aged 65 or older. The average household size was 2.65 and the average family size was 3.10.

The age distribution was: 29.2% <18, 6.8% from 18 to 24, 34.5% from 25 to 44, 17.9% from 45 to 64, and 11.7% 65 or older. The median age was 33 years. For every 100 females, there were 92.7 males. For every 100 females aged 18 and over, there were 89.0 males.

The median household income was $63,629 and the median income for a family was $74,245. Males had a median income of $56,240 versus $38,685 for females. The per capita income for the town was $33,196. About 1.5% of families and 2.3% of the population were below the poverty line, including 1.3% of those under age 18 and 4.4% of those age 65 or over.

== Education ==
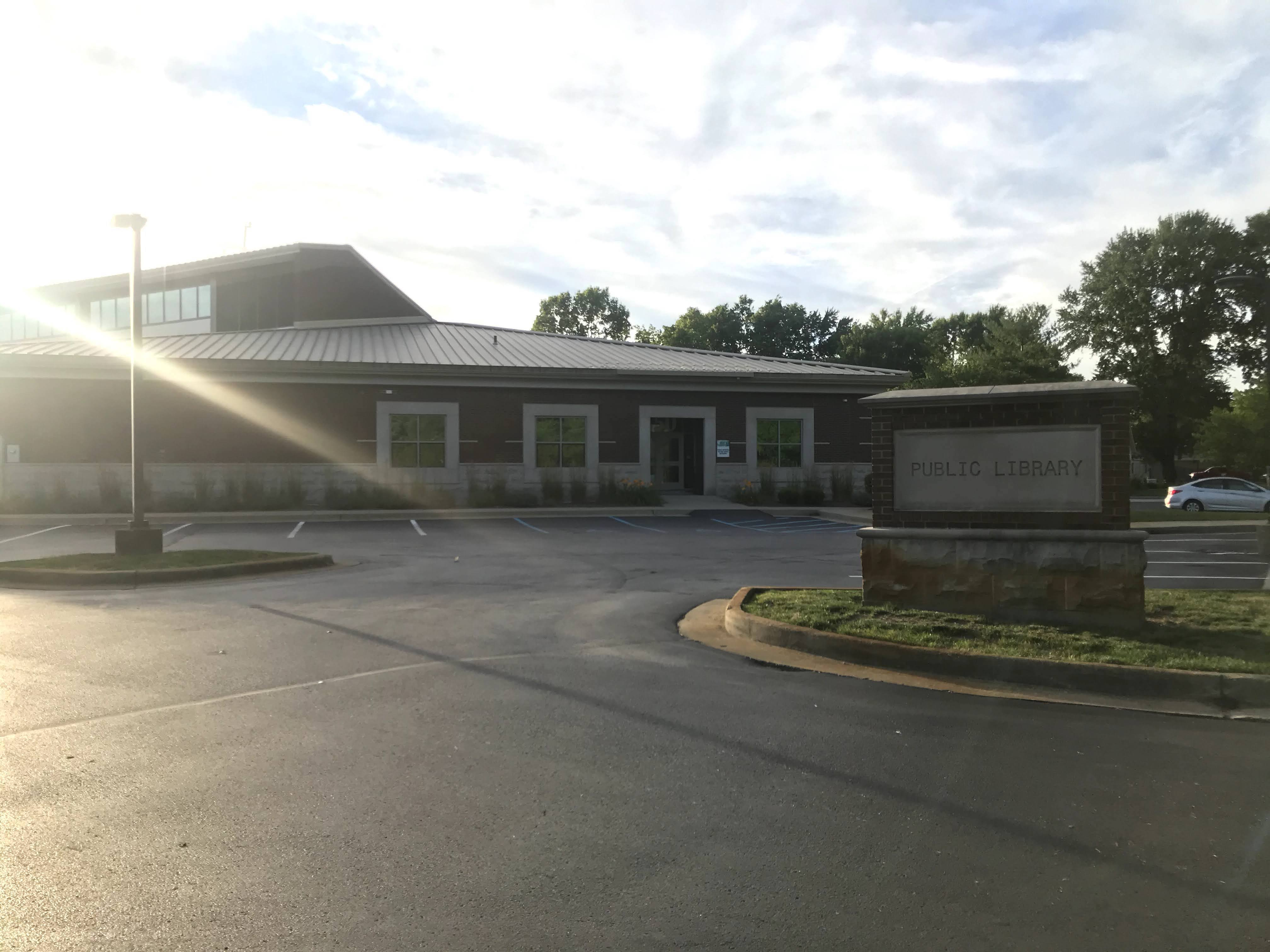
Brownsburg Public Library

=== Public schools ===
Brownsburg Community School Corporation includes the majority of Brownsburg, and maintains all public schools that are located in Brownsburg. The district's comprehensive high school is Brownsburg High School.

A small portion of Brownsburg is within the North West Hendricks Schools school district. The district's comprehensive high school is Tri-West Hendricks High School.

=== Private schools ===
- Bethesda Christian School
- St. Malachy Catholic School Pre-K-8

=== Public library ===
The town has a library, the Brownsburg Public Library.

== Notable people ==
- Christopher Dwightstone Jones, former NFL player, Super Bowl champion
- Adam Andretti, racing driver
- Kristen Ashley, author
- Tucker Barnhart, Major League Baseball (MLB) catcher
- Chloé Dygert, bicyclist
- Chris Estridge, professional soccer player
- Arthur W Graham III, creator of first full-auto electronic race timing and scoring system
- Avani Gregg, social media personality
- Matt Hagans, racing driver
- Gordon Hayward, formerly played basketball at Brownsburg HS, and professionally for the Utah Jazz and Boston Celtics.
- Allen Hughes, Brownsburg native and former New York Times music and dance critic
- Lance Lynn, Chicago White Sox MLB pitcher and 2005 Indiana Mr. Baseball
- Pat McAfee, Indianapolis Colts punter, resides in Brownsburg
- Tony Pedregon, Two-time NHRA Funny Car Champion current NHRA on Fox broadcaster
- Bill Puterbaugh, Racing driver
- Bill Sampen, former Major League Baseball pitcher for three teams
- Robbie Stanley, racing driver
- Joe Staysniak, former Indianapolis Colts offensive linemen
- Drew Storen, Cincinnati Reds MLB pitcher
- Mark Titus, College basketball player and blogger
- Mike Vanderjagt, former NFL kicker and former resident

== See also ==
- Brownsburg Fire Territory
