= Lincoln Township, Hendricks County, Indiana =

Lincoln Township
- Township
- Location in Hendricks County
- Coordinates: 39°49′47″N 86°22′56″W
- Country: United States
- State: Indiana
- County: Hendricks
- Organized: 1863

Government
  - Type: Indiana township

Area
  - Total: 23.92 sq mi (61.94 km^{2})
  - Land: 23.8 sq mi (61.7 km^{2})
  - Water: 0.093 sq mi (0.24 km^{2}) 0.39%
- Elevation: 879 ft (268 m)

Population (2020)
  - Total: 34,773
  - Density: 1,203/sq mi (464.6/km^{2})
- Time zone: UTC-5 (Eastern (EST))
  - Summer (DST): UTC-4 (EDT)
- GNIS feature ID: 453570
- Website: mylincolntownship.com

Lincoln Township is one of twelve townships in Hendricks County, Indiana, United States. As of the 2010 census, its population was 28,665.

== History ==
Lincoln Township was organized in 1863.

== Geography ==
Lincoln Township covers an area of 23.91 square miles (61.9 km^{2}); of this, 0.09 square miles (0.23 km^{2}) or 0.39 percent is water. The streams of Bullard Creek, Hughes Branch and West Fork White Lick Creek run through this township.

=== Cities and towns ===
- Brownsburg (southeast three-quarters)

=== Unincorporated towns ===
- Clermont Heights

(This list is based on USGS data and may include former settlements.)

=== Adjacent townships ===
- Brown Township (north)
- Pike Township, Marion County (east)
- Wayne Township, Marion County (southeast)
- Washington Township (south)
- Middle Township (northwest)

=== Cemeteries ===
The township contains twelve cemeteries: Bell, Brown, Brownsburg, Greenlawn, Hoadley, Lingeman, McDaniels, Prebster, Saint Malachy East, Turpin, Walker and Ward (historical).

=== Major highways ===
- Interstate 74
- U.S. Route 136
- Indiana State Road 267

=== Airports and landing strips ===
- Brownsburg Airport

== Education ==
It is within the Brownsburg Community School Corporation.

Lincoln Township residents may obtain a free library card from the Brownsburg Public Library in Brownsburg.
