= Hoosier Lottery =

Official state lottery of Indiana

The Hoosier Lottery is the official state lottery of Indiana, and is the only US lottery that uses the state's nickname as its official name. It is a member of the Multi-State Lottery Association (MUSL). The Hoosier Lottery sells scratch-off tickets; its draw games include Mega Millions, Hoosier Lotto, Powerball, Cash 5, and Poker Lotto.

The Hoosier Lottery is based in the state capital of Indianapolis, with regional offices in Mishawaka and Evansville.

Indiana was among those states participating in the short-lived multi-state draw game Monopoly Millionaires' Club from October 19 to December 26, 2014.

== History ==
In early American history, legislators commonly established lotteries to fund schools, roads, and other public works. The government of the Indiana Territory in 1807 chartered Vincennes University, authorizing it to raise up to $20,000 in a lottery, to provide for a library and other facilities. The lottery was a failure; after a year, those few tickets that had been sold were recalled. Another lottery was authorized in 1810 to raise $1,000 to buy books for a library in Vincennes, but it was unsuccessful. Another was authorized in 1818 for the Jeffersonville Ohio Canal Company to raise $100,000, but it only brought in $2,536.

The 1840s and 1850s saw a general movement against lotteries in the United States, partly on moral grounds, and partly due to a backlash against legislative corruption. The Indiana constitutional convention of 1851 adopted, with little debate, a clause that "no lottery shall be authorized; nor shall the sale of lottery tickets be allowed".

Vincennes University moved to revive its lottery in 1879, arguing successfully in a test case before the Indiana Supreme Court that, under the Contracts Clause, the lottery provision of the 1807 charter could not be revoked, even by a constitutional ban. The U.S. Supreme Court soon rejected a similar argument in Stone v. Mississippi, but Vincennes was able to run its lottery as a policy game, contracted out to a group of experienced lottery operators from Kentucky, for over a year before it was ruled unlawful in 1883.

In 1988, state voters approved by 62 percent a constitutional amendment lifting the ban. Indiana legislators authorized the state lottery, along with parimutuel betting on horse racing, in May 1989. The first scratch-off game, Hoosier Millionaire, went on sale in October. Lotto Cash, the first online game, began in April 1990.

=== Record in-house jackpot ===
The drawing on November 7, 2007, had a jackpot of $54.5 million, its largest jackpot ever. Retired steel worker Peter Gilbert of East Chicago, Indiana chose the cash option of $40.4 million rather than the 30 annual payments. There were no jackpot winners since October 21, 2006, so the grand prize broke its previous jackpot record of $42 million set June 5, 1999.

== Current draw games ==
=== In-house games ===
==== Daily 3 ====
Daily 3 began in 1990. Prices, prizes and play types vary. Daily 3 is drawn 14 times per week.

==== Daily 4 ====
Daily 4 also began in 1990. Prices, prizes and types of play vary. Daily 4 is drawn 14 times per week.

==== Superball ====
In March 2017, The Hoosier Lottery added superball to its Daily 3 and Daily 4 games. Adding the superball feature gives players an extra number to increase their chances of winning a prize. The feature doubles the cost of the ticket and it applies to all games selected. After the sales cut off and immediately before the drawing, the superball is drawn from ten balls numbered 0 through 9 that applies to both Daily 3 and Daily 4. Players can use the superball number to replace any of the drawn numbers in either Daily 3 or Daily 4. Players win a superball prize if their numbers match the winning number in any given superball combination of the play type that they choose. Players can also win multiple superball prizes in the same game depending upon their numbers and their play type. The odds of winning superball prizes are varied based on the numbers chosen and the play type. The Superball does not apply to Iowa Lottery results, which use the Daily 3 and Daily 4 numbers from Indiana.

==== Cash 5 ====
Cash 5 is the only game that has a cash jackpot. The current game format is played by picking 5 numbers from 1 to 45 for each $1 game played to try to win a cash jackpot that starts at $75,000 and grows along the sales of the game, with a guaranteed increase of $2,500. Players need to match all 5 of the winning numbers in any order drawn to win the jackpot. There are also prizes for matching 2, 3, or 4 of the winning numbers in any order drawn.

==== Quick Draw ====
Quick Draw is daily; games cost $1 each. Players choose 10 numbers from 1-80. The Lottery draws 20 numbers. Matching any 10 of the 20 numbers wins $300,000. This game is very similar to Keno.

==== Hoosier Lotto ====
Hoosier Lotto was the first Indiana lottery game. Drawings are held on Wednesdays and Saturdays. The game draws 6 numbers from a field of primary numbers ranging from 1 through 46. Jackpots begin at $1 million and increases in multiples of $100,000 for each drawing that does not have a jackpot winner. Games cost $2 each. Players can also buy Hoosier Lotto with the + feature for an additional $1 per game to play for $1,000,000 and bigger non jackpot rewards for each game that they purchase for a total price of $3 per game.

==== Cash Pop ====
This game was introduced on April 23, 2023. Players pick one or more numbers from 1 to 15 and select either a $1, $2, $5 or $10 wager for each number that they choose. Prizes range from $5 to $2,500 depending on the amount of money they spend on each number they choose.

=== Multi-jurisdictional games ===
==== Cash4Life ====
The Hoosier lottery joined Cash4Life on September 19, 2016. (The game also is available in Florida, Georgia, Maryland, New Jersey, New York, Pennsylvania, Tennessee, and Virginia.)

Players choose 5 of 60 numbers in one field, and 1 of 4 green "Cash Ball" numbers in the second field. Live drawings are held on Monday and Thursday evenings at 9pm Eastern Time on Livestream. The top prize (win or share) $1,000-per-day-for-life. Second prize is $1,000-per-week-for-life.

==== Mega Millions ====
On October 13, 2009, the Mega Millions consortium and MUSL reached an agreement in principle to cross-sell Mega Millions and Powerball in U.S. lottery jurisdictions. On January 31, 2010, the Hoosier Lottery began selling Mega Millions tickets.

==== Powerball ====
Since 1990, the Hoosier Lottery has been a MUSL member. Powerball began in 1992. Powerball's jackpots currently start at $20 million; it is drawn Monday, Wednesday and Saturday nights.

== Retired games ==
=== Lucky 5 ===
Lucky 5 was replaced by Cash 5 on November 3, 2012.

=== Mix & Match ===
Mix & Match was drawn on Tuesday and Friday evenings. For each Mix & Match ticket, players received three lines of five numbers each; one play cost $2. Five numbers from 1-50 were drawn. There were multiple ways of winning. Players could have matched the 5 numbers across a three line set to win up to $5,000; or matched all five numbers on a single line to win $200,000. The game was retired on August 22, 2014.

=== Poker Lotto ===
With a cost of $2 per play, Poker Lotto is a combination of both instant and draw games. All picks are computer generated "quick picks", as the first half of the game is won by the player being "dealt" a winning poker hand on their ticket. (Pair of Jacks or better, grand prize $5,000). Regardless of a win or loss on the instant game, the player's ticket is eligible for the nightly draw, where the player's cards must match at least 2 of the drawn cards in order to win. (Grand prize $250,000). Poker Lotto began selling tickets on August 25, 2013. The game's end date is unknown.
