= Tim Wilson (comedian) =

American comedian and singer (1961–2014)

- A publicity photo of Tim Wilson.

Background information
- Born: Timothy Collins Wilson; August 5, 1961; Columbus, Georgia, U.S.
- Died: February 26, 2014 (aged 52) Columbus, Georgia, U.S.
- Genres: Country, comedy, parody
- Occupations: Singer-songwriter, comedian
- Instruments: Vocals, acoustic guitar
- Years active: 1984–2014
- Labels: Southern Tracks, Capitol Nashville

Timothy Collins Wilson (August 5, 1961 – February 26, 2014) was an American comedian and country music artist, whose act combined stand-up comedy and original songs.

He released more than a dozen comedy albums, including several for Capitol Records Nashville, and made frequent appearances with Wilhite and Wall, John Boy and Billy, Big D and Bubba and Bob and Tom Show. Wilson also appeared on numerous television programs, including The Tonight Show with Jay Leno and American Revolution Country Comedy on CMT. In 2011, Wilson appeared on CMT's Ron White's Comedy Salute to the Troops.

In 2012, Wilson appeared on the Showtime comedy special Billy Gardell's: Road Dogs with Gardell hosting along with comedians Ben Creed and Kenny Rogerson.

== Life and career ==
Timothy Collins Wilson was born August 5, 1961, in Columbus, Georgia, and attended Presbyterian College in Clinton, South Carolina, as an English major. His parents were school teachers. He was a self-described libertarian, and sometimes included his political standpoints in his comedy routines. He co-wrote several parodies for the 1980s comedy duo Pinkard & Bowden, as well as comedian Jeff Foxworthy's 1996 single "Redneck 12 Days of Christmas." He wrote and recorded the novelty songs "Garth Brooks Has Ruined My Life" and "The Ballad of John Rocker."

Wilson began his recording career in Atlanta, on the Southern Tracks label with music publisher Bill Lowery. Members of the Atlanta Rhythm Section played on many of Wilson's early recordings, with ARS keyboardist Dean Daughtry producing. Wilson later recorded extensively in Muscle Shoals, Alabama, with the Muscle Shoals Rhythm Section. He co-produced Allnight Allstars with Muscle Shoals engineer Steve Melton. The project appeared on Capitol Nashville and includes Levon Helm, Gregg Allman, Jimmy Hall, Bobby Whitlock, and members of both the Atlanta Rhythm Section and the Muscle Shoals Rhythm Section. In 1999, Wilson made a cameo appearance in the country-music mockumentary Dill Scallion.

In 2009, Wilson and Roger Keiss wrote a detective book entitled Happy New Year – ted, about serial killer Ted Bundy. He can be heard discussing his research and his book in great detail while visiting the Off The Air Podcast, hosted by Chick McGee of the Bob and Tom Show.

Wilson was posthumously inducted into the Georgia Music Hall of Fame in September 2015.

== Death ==
Wilson died of a heart attack on February 26, 2014. Early reports stated that he died in Nashville, Tennessee; however, his longtime friend and manager Chris Dipetta clarified that he had been traveling, but had made it to his hometown of Columbus, Georgia, before he died. More details from the referenced story state: "Wilson, 52, drove to Columbus from a gig in Michigan to visit his brother en route to a weekend show in Birmingham, Ala. when he started feeling ill, said Dipetta, who worked with Wilson for 30 years." Dipetta continued, "I talked to him yesterday afternoon and he said he felt bad, was short of breath, and I said, 'get to the hospital now!' Wilson's brother rushed him to a nearby hospital and Wilson suffered a massive heart attack and died at 9:15 p.m." Wilson left behind his wife, and two children.

== Tribute show ==
On May 9, 2014, The Bob and Tom show sponsored a tribute comedy show to honor Wilson and help provide an education for his son. This three-and-a-half-hour show was presented at the Paramount Theatre (Anderson, Indiana). The announced lineup included the Bob and Tom show personalities (Bob Kevoian, Tom Griswold, Kristi Lee, and Chick McGee), as well as Dr. Gonzo, Heywood Banks, Drew Hastings, and Donny Baker. Surprise guests were introduced during the show and included, Duke Tumatoe, Indianapolis Colts punter Pat McAfee, Ricky Rydell and Scotty Bratcher. Additional music talent was provided by Steve Allee, keyboard and PJ Yinger, trumpet. Additionally, Bob Kevoian did an emotional solo performance of a Tim Wilson tribute song on ukulele. Wilson's last appearance on The Bob and Tom Show was on December 10, 2013.

== Discography ==
=== Albums ===
Title	Album details	Peak chart positions		
Title	Album details	US Country	US Comedy	US Heat
Waking Up the Neighborhood	Release date: July 26, 1994; Label: Southern Tracks	—	—	—
Tough Crowd	Release date: July 15, 1995; Label: Southern Tracks	—	—	—
Low-Class Love Affair	Release date: September 18, 1995; Label: Southern Tracks	—	—	—
Tuned Up	Release date: May 6, 1997; Label: Southern Tracks	—	—	—
It's a Sorry World	Release date: February 9, 1999; Label: Capitol Nashville	44	—	31
Road Comedy 101	Release date: February 16, 1999; Label: Southern Tracks	—	—	—
Gettin' My Mind Right	Release date: October 5, 1999; Label: Capitol Nashville	28	—	28
Hillbilly Homeboy	Release date: June 6, 2000; Label: Capitol Nashville	48	—	—
I Should've Married My Father-In-Law	Release date: October 23, 2001; Label: Capitol Nashville	64	—	—
Super Bad Sounds of the 70's	Release date: May 20, 2003; Label: Capitol Nashville	57	—	—
The Real Twang Thang	Release date: January 25, 2005; Label: Capitol Nashville	—	11	—
Church League Softball Fistfight	Release date: November 22, 2005; Label: Capitol Nashville	—	12	—
But I Could Be Wrong	Release date: March 20, 2007; Label: Capitol Nashville	61	4	42
Mr. Wilson Explains America	Release date: October 20, 2009; Label: Capitol Nashville	—	13	—
Caffeine Wired, Nervous & Pale	Release date: June 11, 2013; Label: Capitol Nashville	—	—	—
"—" denotes releases that did not chart

=== Compilation albums ===
Title	Album details	Peak positions
Title	Album details	US Country
Songs for the Musically Disturbed: His (Almost) Greatest Hits	Release date: November 26, 1996; Label: Southern Tracks	—
Certified Aluminum: His Greatest Recycled Hits, Volume 1	Release date: August 13, 2002; Label: Capitol Nashville	62
"—" denotes releases that did not chart

=== Singles ===
Year	Single	Peak positions	Album
Year	Single	US Country	Album
1993	"Garth Brooks Has Ruined My Life"	70	Tough Crowd
1994	"He's My Brother-in-Law"	—	Tough Crowd
2000	"The Ballad of John Rocker"	66	Hillbilly Homeboy
2002	"The Jeff Gordon Song"	—	Certified Aluminum
2003	"Booty Man"	—	Super Bad Sounds of the 70's
"—" denotes releases that did not chart

=== Music videos ===
Year	Video	Director
1993	"He's My Brother-in-Law"	Bill Bensen
