= Escamilla (surname) =

Escamilla is a Mexican surname. Notable people with the surname include:

- Cuitlahuac Condado Escamilla (born 1978), Mexican politician
- David Escamilla, harsh vocalist of American metalcore band Crown the Empire
- Dolores Guadalupe García Escamilla (c. 1966–2005), Mexican crime reporter and anchorwoman
- Franco Escamilla (born 1981), Mexican comedian, voice actor, musician, philanthropist, businessman, and freestyler
- Ignacio Escamilla (born 1967), Mexican swimmer
- Itzan Escamilla (born 1997), Spanish actor
- Jesus "Jose" Escamilla (1951–2018), American singer-songwriter and filmmaker
- Jose Escamilla, the first to film rods as alien life forms
- José María Cañas Escamilla (1809—1860), Salvadoran military figure
- Juan Carlos Escamilla (born 1978), American politician
- Kevin Escamilla (born 1994), Mexican footballer
- Licho Escamilla (1982−2015), American convicted murderer
- Luis Tristán de Escamilla (c.1585–1624), Spanish painter
- Luz Escamilla (born 1978), Mexican politician
- Manuela Escamilla (1648–1721), Spanish playwright, stage actress, and theatre manager
- Moisés Escamilla May, former leader of the "Old School Zetas"
- Nicolasa Escamilla (fl. 1747 – fl. 1776), Spanish bullfighter
- Quique Escamilla (born 1980), Mexican Mayan-Zapotec multi-instrumentalist musician, singer-songwriter, and producer
- Rosa Luz Alegría Escamilla (born 1949), Mexican physicist and the first woman to serve in the Mexican Executive Cabinet
- Raymundo Escamilla (born 1964), Mexican politician
- Teo Escamilla (1940–1997), Spanish cinematographer

== See also ==
- Rafael Perez-Escamilla, Mexican-American public health nutritionist
