= Bob and Tom Radio: The Comedy Tour =

Bob and Tom Radio: The Comedy Tour--Volume 1
- Produced by: Bob Kevoian; Tom Griswold
- Starring: Greg Hahn; Mike Armstrong; Roy Wood, Jr.; Drew Hastings; Bob Zany
- Distributed by: Image Entertainment
- Release date: 2006
- Running time: 74 minutes
- Country: United States
- Language: English

Bob and Tom Radio: The Comedy Tour is a 2006 comedy DVD based on The Bob & Tom Show, an American syndicated radio program known for its comedic format. The DVD serves as a recorded extension of the show's live comedy tours, which feature a rotating lineup of standup comedians regularly associated with the radio program.

The show’s format, created by hosts Bob Kevoian and Tom Griswold, combines interviews, comedic sketches, and satirical commentary, attracting a broad audience. In the mid-2000s, Kevoian and Griswold began producing live comedy tours across the United States, bringing popular comedians from the show to perform live sets. These events often feature one of the show's regular personalities, like Kristi Lee or Chick McGee, as the emcee to connect with audiences and maintain the radio show’s atmosphere in a live setting.

The performances on The Comedy Tour DVD were recorded at the Paramount Theatre in Anderson, Indiana, capturing routines by comedians such as Greg Hahn, Roy Wood, Jr., Drew Hastings, and Bob Zany. The content is structured to appeal to fans of the radio program while also presenting the comedic styles of individual performers. The DVD was later promoted with a shortened broadcast on Comedy Central, expanding its reach to a television audience prior to its official release for home viewing.

== Volume 1 comedians ==
- Greg Hahn
- Mike Armstrong
- Roy Wood Jr.
- Drew Hastings
- Bob Zany
