= Kristi Lee =

American radio personality

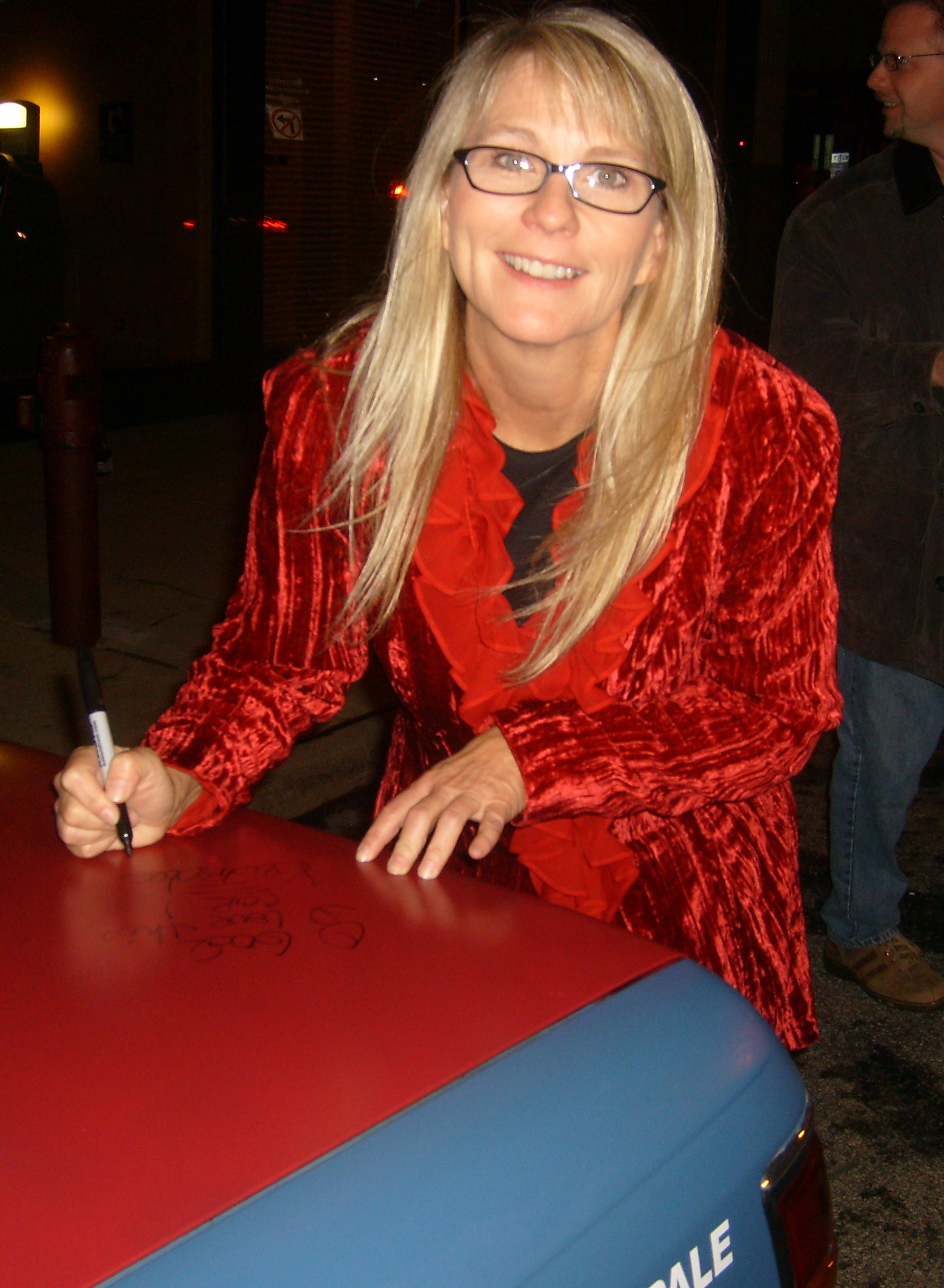
- Lee in 2008
- Born: Indianapolis, Indiana
- Presenting career
- Show: The Bob & Tom Show
- Country: United States
- Website: kristileenews.com

Kristi Lee is the news director and a co-host of the nationally syndicated radio show The Bob & Tom Show and is responsible for delivering newscasts of various headlines (which are often used for humorous takeoffs) during the show. She is also a member of the Indiana Broadcast Pioneers Hall of Fame Class of 2022.

Lee often hosted or participated in Bob and Tom Radio: The Comedy Tour shows.

Lee graduated from Ben Davis High School in Indianapolis and got her start on WBDG, the school's station. She attended Indiana University.

Lee's first full-time job in communications was at WRTV, where she was a television engineer for six years. At the time, she was also a part-time disc jockey for WFBQ Q95, the station which eventually hired Bob Kevoian and Tom Griswold for mornings. She began her full-time radio career on The Bob and Tom Show in 1988. Lee was also featured on ESPN and ESPN2 as a sideline reporter, covering events like lacrosse, auto racing, and the first three X Games on ESPN2. In the mid-nineties, she was the sideline reporter for the NBA's Indiana Pacers.

On January 11, 2016, Lee announced that she was leaving The Bob and Tom Show. Prior to her later return, Lee's last "on air" appearance was on December 17, 2015. In an April 2016 appearance on the Hammer and Nigel podcast, Lee revealed that her Bob and Tom contract had been "rolling over for 12 years" and included a three-month non-compete clause, a length brief enough as to be considered "unheard of in our business." Since any new contract would likely have extended her non-compete requirement to six or 12 months, Lee said she chose not to renew her contract. It was "time to try something different," Lee said. "If I'm going to do this, it's going to have to be now." The announcement and timing of Kevoian's December 2015 retirement was a surprise to Lee, and she told the Dan Dakich Show that "Bob wasn't there, and I didn't want to sit in that room without Bobby" despite her continued fondness for Griswold and Chick McGee, the show's remaining longtime stars.

On July 8, 2016, The Bob and Tom Show announced that Lee would return to the show on July 11, 2016. In an interview with BoomerTV's Patty Spitler, Lee reiterated that a desire to find her own voice as an interviewer and to create her "own brand" were her primary motivations for what ended up being a hiatus from The Bob and Tom Show. Lee also said Griswold initiated the discussions which led to her return.

During her six-month break from Bob and Tom, Lee began hosting a podcast titled Kristi Lee Uninterrupted, which debuted on April 5, 2016, and was affiliated with Dr. Will's Neighborhood. Its title is a reference to Griswold's habit of constantly interrupting her Bob and Tom Show news reports. Lee produced podcast episodes through August 2018.

On June 27, 2022, Lee was named as a member of the Indiana Broadcast Pioneers Hall of Fame Class of 2022, and the induction ceremony took place on October 4, 2022.

Kristi's engagement to a gentleman named "Andy" was announced on the Bob and Tom Show on March 21, 2023.
