= Drew Hastings =

American comedian, author, and mayor

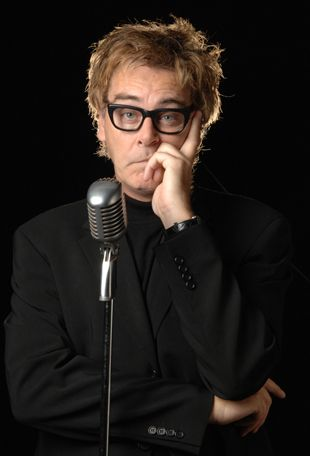
- Born: W. Drew Hastings; March 2, 1954 (age 72); Casablanca, Morocco
- Occupations: stand-up comedian, author, and former mayor
- Notable work: Irked And Miffed

Comedy career
- Medium: Stand up comedy
- Website: DrewHastings.com

Drew Hastings (born March 2, 1954) is an American stand-up comedian, author, and former mayor of Hillsboro, Ohio. Standing 6 ft 6 in (198 cm) tall, he is often seen performing in a black suit and black horn-rimmed glasses.

== Early life ==
Hastings was born in Casablanca, Morocco to an English mother, Pamela, and an American G.I. father named Drew. He emigrated to the United States at a young age and grew up in the Midwest, particularly in the Ohio cities of Kettering, Dayton and Cincinnati.

== Stand-up comedy ==
Hastings began performing onstage at the age of thirty-one. After having lived in several large cities in the 1970s, including San Francisco and New York, he had moved back to Ohio. In the early 1990s, he moved to Los Angeles, where he would later receive several guest-starring roles and television pilots for networks such as Fox, NBC, and HBO. While in California, he wrote and starred in several one-person shows, including, Commencement Speech, Life & Other Short Stories, and The Business of Living, the latter directed by Bob Odenkirk. The main character of The Business of Living, a motivational speaker/success guru named "Jack Freeman", gained a cult following in California and has become increasingly popular throughout the Midwest. While living in L.A., he got a rare standing ovation on "The Tonight Show".

Hastings would later sit in as a guest on The Bob & Tom Show. In 2006, he starred in The Friends of Bob & Tom Comedy Central special alongside other comedians such as Bob Zany, Greg Hahn, and Roy Wood, Jr.

On April 26, 2008, Comedy Central aired Drew Hastings: Irked and Miffed, Hastings' premiere one-hour television special. The performance was released on May 6, 2008, through Image Entertainment.

== Mayoral bid ==
Hastings expressed interest in running for mayor in the city of Hillsboro, Ohio in June 2010 as a Republican Party candidate. On January 20, 2011, Hastings took out a candidate petition to run for the position of mayor for the city of Hillsboro.

Hastings filed his petition with the county's Board of Elections, as did two other Republican hopefuls. With the city's primary election held on May 3, 2011, Hastings won the primary election with receiving 295 votes. On November 8, 2011, Hastings won the Hillsboro, Ohio general election garnering 1,008 votes and his opponent, John Levo, received 614 votes. He was sworn in on January 2, 2012.

On November 3, 2015, Hastings won a second term as mayor of Hillsboro with 59% of the vote over Pam Limes.

On July 12, 2016, Hastings was indicted on four charges, including elections fraud, following a months-long investigation by special prosecutors appointed by a Highland County judge. The counts included theft, theft in office and tampering with records. The judge in the case dismissed 2 of the 4 felony charges against Hastings, and a jury found him not guilty on the remaining charges on November 9, 2016.

== Electoral history ==
Hillsboro, Ohio Mayoral Election, 2011
Party	Candidate	Votes	%
Republican	Drew Hastings	1,008	62.15
Independent	John Levo	614	37.86
Total votes		1,622	100

Hillsboro, Ohio Mayoral Election, 2015
Party	Candidate	Votes	%
Republican	Drew Hastings	1,027	59
Democratic	Pam Limes	705	41
Total votes		1,732	100

== Writing and books ==
In September 2020, Hastings released The Business of Living, based on his one-person show of the same name. It was written under the pseudonym, Jack Freeman. A satire of the success and self-help genre. https://www.amazon.com/Business-Living-dont-need-success/dp/0578767228/ref=tmm_pap_swatch_0?_encoding=UTF8&qid=1639534942&sr=1-2

- Hastings memoir, "Chasing Drew Hastings; a memoir" was completed in October 2021, and has a February 2022 release date.

== Stage and screen ==
One man shows

- Tales Of Unrepentance – Written and performed by Drew Hastings – HBO Theatre, Los Angeles, CA – 1998
- The Business of Living – Written and performed by Drew Hastings – HBO Workspace – Los Angeles, CA – 1999
- Yard Sale – Written and performed by Drew Hastings – Tamarind Theatre, Los Angeles – 1995

Movies

- Melvin Goes to Dinner – 2003 directed by Bob Odenkirk
- Let's Go To Prison – 2006 directed by Bob Odenkirk

Television

- The Peter Principle – 2000 – Uncredited – Co-starred with Paul F. Tompkins
- The Big Wide World Of Carl Laemke - 2003 - Uncredited directed by Bob Odenkirk

== Discography ==
- Farmageddon -October 22, 2012
- Drew Hastings: Irked and Miffed - May 6, 2008
- Bob and Tom Radio: The Comedy Tour - September 19, 2006
- I Have No Fight With You People - 2005
- I'm Just Like You - 2003

== Books ==
- The Business of Living: You don't need the key to success if you know how to pick the lock!. Caleb Hill Press. 2020. ISBN 978-0-578-76722-2.
- Chasing Drew Hastings; a memoir. Caleb Hill Press. 2022. ISBN 978-1-7358066-1-7.
