= The Electric Amish =

Indiana-based parody rock band

The Electric Amish is an American parody rock music band featuring three fictional characters from Indiana Amish country. The group first started as a skit in the early 1990s, and went on to record three albums between 1995 and 1999.

Based in Indiana, they are well known for taking rock standards and recasting them from a heavily tongue-in-cheek Amish perspective. The band consists of three fictional characters: Graeber Goodman (born in Las Vegas, Nevada, moved to Lancaster, Pennsylvania, and settled in Nappanee, Indiana) on electric guitar and vocals; Carl Goodman (born in Berne, Indiana) on electric bass and vocals; and Barry Goodman (born in Goshen, Indiana) on drums and vocals. The true identities behind these personas are, respectively, Dean Metcalf (former producer of The Bob & Tom Show), and brothers Barclay Grayson and Kyle Grayson—all of central Indiana.

== Humor ==
Much of the humor in their lyrics presupposes at least a passing understanding of Amish and Mennonite cultures (for example, outsiders are called "the English"). The band rose to stardom after performing on The Bob & Tom Show, where they can occasionally still be heard.

== Albums ==
The Electric Amish released their first album, Barn to Be Wild, in 1995, followed by Milkin' It in 1996 and A Hard Day's Work in 1999. They also have a song, "Farmageddon," on the 1998 release Back in '98, which features items from The Bob & Tom Show. While the band has not released anything since 1999, they continue to perform occasionally, mostly in the Upper Midwest US. They record on the DonkeyMonkey label.

== Band members ==
- Graeber Goodman (Dean Metcalf) – Electric guitar and vocals
- Carl Goodman (Barclay Grayson) – Electric bass and vocals
- Barry Goodman (Kyle Grayson) – Drums and vocals

== Recordings ==
=== Barn to Be Wild, 1995 ===
1. "We Are an Amish Band"
2. "Black Bonnet Girls"
3. "Come Together (and Build a Barn)"
4. "Mennonite Blues"
5. "Amish Lady"
6. "My Congregation"
7. "Barn to Be Wild"
8. "Amish Country Blues"
9. "Mennonite Girl"
10. "A Girl on Theology"
11. "Give Me Three Pigs"
12. "Very Amish Christmas"

=== Milkin' It, 1996 ===
1. "I Want to Dress in Black & White (and Work Real Hard All Day)"
2. "Graeber Be Good"
3. "I Want to Hoe Your Land"
4. "For Your Mule"
5. "No More Mennonite Guy"
6. "Proud Gretta (Rollin' in My Buggy)"
7. "Big Ol' Horse & Buggy"
8. "The Parson's Back"
9. "He's from Goshen"
10. "Heathen"
11. "Mush"
12. "Christmas Time in Amish Land"

=== Back in '98, 1998 ===
1. "Farmageddon"

=== A Hard Day's Work, 1999 ===
1. "Hay Ride"
2. "Welcome to My Home in Pennsylvania"
3. "Sweet Home Indiana"
4. "Parson"
5. "Graeber Be Good" (with Jonny Lang)
6. "Y2K Crash"
7. "Wear Black"
8. "All Right Cow"
9. "Amish Man"
10. "Donkey Walk"
11. "What If Tom Was One of Us"
12. "Parson Klaus Is Coming to Town"
