= Tom Griswold =

American radio personality (born 1953)

- Born: Thomas Bruce Griswold; April 22, 1953 (age 73); Cleveland, Ohio
- Presenting career
- Show: The Bob & Tom Show
- Station: WJTQ Pensacola, Florida
- Time slot: 6:00 am-9:00 am CT Weekdays
- Style: Comedy, Satire
- Country: United States
- Website: www.bobandtom.com

Thomas Bruce Griswold (born April 22, 1953) co-hosts the radio show The Bob & Tom Show together with Chick McGee, Kristi Lee, and Josh Arnold. Co-host Bob Kevoian retired at the end of 2015. This comedy-based early morning program is among the highest rated in American radio and has been nationally syndicated since 1995. The show is broadcast from studios at WFBQ in Indianapolis, Indiana.

== Radio career ==
Griswold worked in radio in WETO in DeLand, Florida and WMBN and WJML in Petoskey, Michigan. While in Petoskey, Griswold met Bob Kevoian, and the duo moved to Indianapolis to launch The Bob & Tom Show at WFBQ in March 1983. After 12 years of broadcasting to central Indiana, they began syndicating their show nationally on January 6, 1995.

Griswold often hosts or participates in Bob and Tom Radio: The Comedy Tour shows.

Griswold and Kevoian were inducted into the National Radio Hall of Fame on November 5, 2015. The Indiana Broadcasters Association gave Griswold a Lifetime Achievement Award on October 3, 2022, during the association's annual meeting.

== Personal life ==
Griswold was born in Cleveland, Ohio, the son of Herbert Bruce and Sally Griswold. He is a 1971 graduate of University School in Hunting Valley, Ohio and a graduate of Columbia University with a degree in Literature. Griswold is the father of seven children, including three boys and four girls. His children are Sam, Willie, Lucy, Charlie, Sally, Finley and Hart Griswold. At age 4, Finley recovered from emergency surgery to remove a benign brain tumor. Charlie, 27, died suddenly on July 29, 2022.

Griswold's sister is model Janet Griswold de Villeneuve; his nieces are Daisy and Poppy de Villeneuve.

In July 2009, Griswold was hospitalized for nearly a week due to a broken right arm (humerus bone) and a shoulder injury he suffered after falling from a motorcycle. The injury required surgery that included numerous screws and a plate in his arm. He returned to the air on July 30, 2009.

Griswold was hospitalized for heart valve replacement surgery for several days during August 2021. Doctors had initially planned to perform a valve repair operation but determined that a valve replacement "would provide a better long term outcome." Griswold resumed broadcasting on September 13, 2021.

Griswold and fellow Bob and Tom Show cast members occasionally encourage listeners to make charitable contributions. Griswold has supported the Miracle Ride and Riley Children's Foundation, the charitable arm of Riley Hospital for Children.

== Television ==
The Bob and Tom Show, a one-hour video version of the four-hour radio show featuring clips from that morning's broadcast, debuted on WGN America in November 2008 and ran weeknights until its cancellation in September 2010.

A newer, 30-minute Bob and Tom television show aired weeknights and late Saturday evenings from October 5, 2020, through January 8, 2022, on MyIndy-TV 23 (WNDY-TV, Indianapolis). A 20-minute version of Bob and Tom Tonight continues to be posted at 8 p.m. (Eastern Time) weekdays on YouTube and Facebook.
