= WZRL =

Urban contemporary radio station in Indianapolis

- Plainfield, Indiana; United States
- Broadcast area: Indianapolis metropolitan area
- Frequency: 98.3 MHz (HD Radio)
- Branding: Real 98-3

Programming
- Language: English
- Format: Urban contemporary
- Affiliations: Premiere Networks

Ownership
- Owner: iHeartMedia; (iHM Licenses, LLC)
- Sister stations: WFBQ; WNDE; WOLT; W248AW

History
- First air date: August 16, 1964
- Former call signs: WJMK (1964–1974); WART-FM (1974–1980); WXIR (1980–2003); WRDZ-FM (2003–2015); WUBG (2015–2016)
- Call sign meaning: "Real"

Technical information
- Licensing authority: FCC
- Facility ID: 54705
- Class: A
- ERP: 3,000 watts
- HAAT: 91 meters (299 ft)
- Transmitter coordinates: 39°45′33″N 86°22′30″W

Links
- Public license information: Public file; LMS
- Webcast: Listen live (via iHeartRadio)
- Website: real983.iheart.com

WZRL (98.3 FM) is a commercial radio station licensed to Plainfield, Indiana, serving the Indianapolis metropolitan area. It broadcasts an urban contemporary format and is owned and operated by iHeartMedia. The WZRL broadcast license is held by iHM Licenses, LLC. WZRL carries The Breakfast Club morning drive time show from co-owned WWPR-FM in New York City. The studios are located on Fall Creek Road on the northeast side of Indianapolis.

WZRL transmits from a tower in Avon; it also broadcasts in the HD Radio hybrid format.

== History ==
=== Early years (1964–1980) ===
In 1964, James Thomas Barlow was interested in building a radio station in the Indianapolis media market. In March of that year, he received a construction permit from the Federal Communications Commission to build a 3,000-watt radio station in Plainfield.

On August 16, 1964, the station signed on as WJMK. It broadcast a variety. It was the first station in Hendricks County. In August 1964, it was one of the four FM stations in the Indianapolis area that broadcast in stereo.

In 1974, the station was sold to A&R Broadcasting, Inc. and changed its call sign to WART-FM.

=== Christian (1980–2003) ===
In 1980, A&R Broadcasting sold the station to Radio One Five Hundred Inc. (the owner of WBRI) for $500,000. The new owners changed its format to Christian radio. On December 15, it changed the call sign to WXIR.

=== Radio Disney (2003–2015) ===
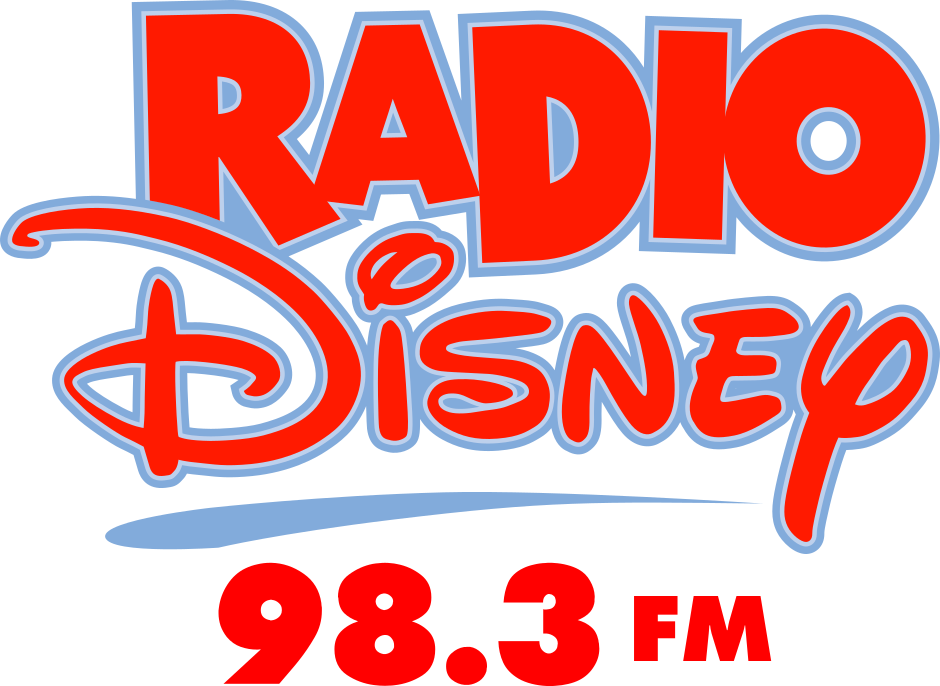
WRDZ-FM logo used from 2003 until 2007.

On March 5, 2003, WXIR was sold to ABC Radio (a subsidiary of The Walt Disney Company) for $5.75 million. The application was accepted for Filing on March 20, and approved by the Federal Communications Commission on May 6. The sale was consummated on July 1, and the station became the Radio Disney affiliate for the Indianapolis metropolitan area. On August 19, Disney changed the call sign to WRDZ-FM.

In 2004, WRDZ-FM started to broadcast in the HD Radio format and since then, is licensed to broadcast under that format.

On August 13, 2014, it was announced that Radio Disney planned to sell all of its remaining owned-and-operated stations (including WRDZ-FM and with the lone exception of KDIS in Los Angeles) to focus on the network's programming, co-branded events, and digital outlets. Disney originally planned to temporarily shut down the stations in question on September 26. However, Disney changed their plans at the last minute, and all stations would remain on the air, continuing to broadcast Radio Disney programming until each were sold.

=== Country (2015–2016) ===
As of April 2015, rumors abounded online that iHeartMedia would buy the station, the last remaining FM station in Radio Disney's portfolio, and flip it to Country as "Big 98.3", matching similar stations in Pittsburgh and Chicago under the branding. These rumors only heated up as the company registered the domain Big983Indy.com the same month. The rumors were confirmed on May 29, on that day, Radio Disney Group (the Disney subsidiary that held the station's license) filed an application to sell WRDZ-FM to iHeartMedia's Capstar TX LLC. iHeartMedia bought WRDZ-FM (and KWDZ) for $1.95 million and planned to operate the station under a local marketing agreement (which did not happen). The sale was approved by the Federal Communications Commission on July 14. The transaction was completed on July 17. and the call sign were changed to WUBG.

On July 17, at 4:00 p.m., the station flipped to the country music, initiating a three-way battle with WFMS and WLHK. Since September, WUBG aired the Premiere Networks' syndicated program Bobby Bones Show in morning drive. Some websites specializing in media reported that the program was originally scheduled to begin airing on August 16. Despite its best efforts, WUBG failed to take many listeners away from either WLHK or WFMS; in the September 2016 Nielsen Audio ratings report (its last as "Big"), WUBG had just a 1.0 share of the market, relatively minute compared to WFMS' 6.0 and WLHK's 4.7.

=== Urban (2016–present) ===
On October 2, 2016, WUBG began stunting with a promotion liner about a change coming the next day at noon on a continuous loop. At the promised time, WUBG flipped to urban, branded as "Real 98-3", taking direct aim at WHHH. "Real" launched with 10,000 'joints' in a row, with the first song being "For Free" by DJ Khaled and Drake. iHeartMedia had applied for the callsign WZRL for the station on the 2nd; the callsign change was implemented two days later on the 4th. The station began airing The Breakfast Club in mornings starting November 3, other on-air personalities are to be announced.

== Programming ==
In the beginnings, the station (as WJMK) broadcast music and news, with time given to sports and local affairs. The hour of programming was from 6 a.m. to 12:30 a.m. on weekdays, from 7 a.m. to 1 a.m. on Saturdays and from 8 a.m. to midnight on Sundays.

From July 1, 2003, until July 17, 2015, WZRL (as WRDZ-FM) carried programming from the Radio Disney network, which broadcast a contemporary hit radio music format except weekdays at noon (12:00–1:00 p.m.) when the format changed to children's music. In addition, WRDZ-FM locally produced a public affair show called Kids Concern Show, which aired at 6:30 a.m. on Saturday mornings. As of 2014, WRDZ-FM was the last Radio Disney station broadcasting on FM.
