= WOLT =

Radio station in Indianapolis, Indiana

Coordinates: 39.895°N 86.201°W

- Indianapolis, Indiana; United States
- Broadcast area: Indianapolis metropolitan area
- Frequency: 103.3 MHz (HD Radio)
- Branding: Indy 103-3

Programming
- Format: Classic alternative
- Subchannels: HD2: Bloomberg Radio
- Affiliations: Premiere Networks

Ownership
- Owner: iHeartMedia, Inc.; (iHM Licenses, LLC)
- Sister stations: WFBQ, WNDE, WZRL, W248AW

History
- First air date: May 15, 1964
- Former call signs: WGEE-FM (1964–1972); WXTZ (1972–1989); WMJC (1989–1990); WFXF (1990); WFXF-FM (1990–1992); WRZX (1992–2014)
- Call sign meaning: Phonetically similar to "alt" if said as "ŏlt"; also shares similarity to "Colt"

Technical information
- Licensing authority: FCC
- Facility ID: 59589
- Class: B
- ERP: 18,000 watts
- HAAT: 259 meters (850 ft)
- Translator: HD2: 97.5 W248AW (Indianapolis)

Links
- Public license information: Public file; LMS
- Webcast: Listen live (via iHeartRadio)
- Website: indy1033.iheart.com

WOLT (103.3 FM "Indy 103.3") is a commercial radio station in Indianapolis, Indiana. It broadcasts a classic alternative format and is owned by iHeartMedia, Inc. The studios are at 6161 Fall Creek Road on the northeast side of Indianapolis.

WOLT has an effective radiated power (ERP) of 18,000 watts. The transmitter and tower are on Township Drive near West 79th Street. WOLT is licensed to broadcast using HD Radio technology. The HD2 digital subchannel airs a business news format branded as "Business News 97.5" (which feeds FM translator W248AW at 97.5 MHz).

== History ==
=== WGEE (1964–1972) ===
On May 15, 1964, the station signed on as WGEE-FM. It was the FM counterpart to WGEE (1590 AM, now WNTS). The two stations simulcasted a country music format. Because the AM station was a daytimer, required to go off the air at sunset, WGEE-FM continued the programming into the night. Several years later, WGEE-AM-FM switched to a Top 40 format.

=== Easy listening (1972–1989) ===
WGEE-FM was sold to Mid America Radio in 1972; upon the ownership change, it became WXTZ, broadcasting a beautiful music format. (The call sign represented the word "Ecstasy.") WXTZ played quarter hour sweeps of soft, instrumental cover versions of popular adult songs, as well as Broadway and Hollywood show tunes. WXTZ was one of the top stations in Indianapolis in the 1970s and early 1980s, but by the late 1980s, the audience for easy listening music was beginning to age, while most advertisers sought younger to middle aged listeners. The station added more soft vocals and reduced the instrumentals to appeal to younger music fans.

=== Soft adult contemporary (1989–1991) ===
On November 2, 1989, the station completed its transition to a soft adult contemporary format as "Magic 103.3." The call letters were changed to WMJC to represent the word "Magic."

=== Classic rock (1991–1992) ===
Just prior to a purchase by Broadcast Alchemy, a company that formed part of what is now Clear Channel Communications, the station became WFXF-FM on August 17, 1990. "The Fox" played classic rock to compete with highly rated WFBQ. Following the sale, however, the two classic rock outlets became sister stations.

=== Active rock/Alternative (1992–present) ===
The station flipped to an active rock format as WRZX "Solid Rock X-103" on August 21, 1992. In late 1993, WRZX shifted to alternative and rebranded as "X-103 Indy's New Rock Alternative." On June 12, 2014, WRZX rebranded as "Alt 103-3." On June 20, the call letters changed to WOLT. (The WRZX call letters now reside on a sister station in Newnan, Georgia.)

WOLT's current lineup has "The Woody Show" from KYSR Los Angeles in morning drive time, Theresa in middays, Ben in afternoon drive and Mike Jones evenings. Outside of afternoons, all DJs shifts are syndicated from out of state.

At 12:01 a.m. on August 25, 2022, after playing "My Ex's Best Friend" by Machine Gun Kelly featuring Blackbear, WOLT shifted to a "classic" alternative rock format, with the playlist now focusing on classic alternative music from between the 1980s and mid-2000s, rebranding as "Indy 103.3"; the first song as "Indy" was "American Idiot" by Green Day. No changes in personnel or programming were made otherwise.

== HD Radio ==
WOLT airs a simulcast of mainstream urban sister station WZRL on its HD2 subchannel.

On August 15, 2019, WOLT launched a Top 40/CHR format on its HD3 subchannel, branded as "97.5 Kiss FM." The subchannel feeds FM translator W248AW at 97.5 FM in Indianapolis.

On June 1, 2020, WOLT-HD3 and W248AW changed to business and financial news and information, branded as "Business News 97.5". It carries mostly programming from Bloomberg Radio.

== Events ==
WOLT currently presents two major station-sponsored concerts each year: its annual "Birthday Show" is held in the summertime, and "The Night ALT 103-3 Stole Christmas" is held in late November and early December.

Previous Birthday Shows featured The Killers, Kings of Leon, Foster the People, Cage the Elephant, Young the Giant, 311, Dirty Heads, Andrew McMahon in the Wilderness, Catfish & The Bottlemen, Sir Sly and more.
