= Will Miller (therapist) =

American therapist (born 1949)

- Born: September 14, 1949 (age 77)
- Notable work: The Bob & Tom Show regular

Comedy career
- Years active: 1979–1994
- Website: www.drwill.com

William E. Miller (born September 14, 1949) is an American ordained minister, former standup comedian, keynote speaker, teacher and full-time therapist. He was best known for being Nick at Nite's resident television therapist and the host of their "Why We Watch" segments starting in 1992.

== Education ==
He is a 1971 graduate of Providence College. He has a masters and doctorate from the University of Massachusetts Amherst.

Year	School	Degree
1971	Providence College	Bachelor of Arts - English Literature/Education
1974	University of Massachusetts Amherst	Master in Education - Urban Education
1976	University of Massachusetts Amherst	Doctorate in Education (Urban Education & Administration)
1990	Union Theological Seminary (New York City)	Master in Divinity
1990	Columbia University (New York City)	Master of Science in Social Work (Clinical & Family Practice)
2011	Walden University	Master of Science in Health Psychology
