= Backscatter (photography) =

Optical phenomenon in photography

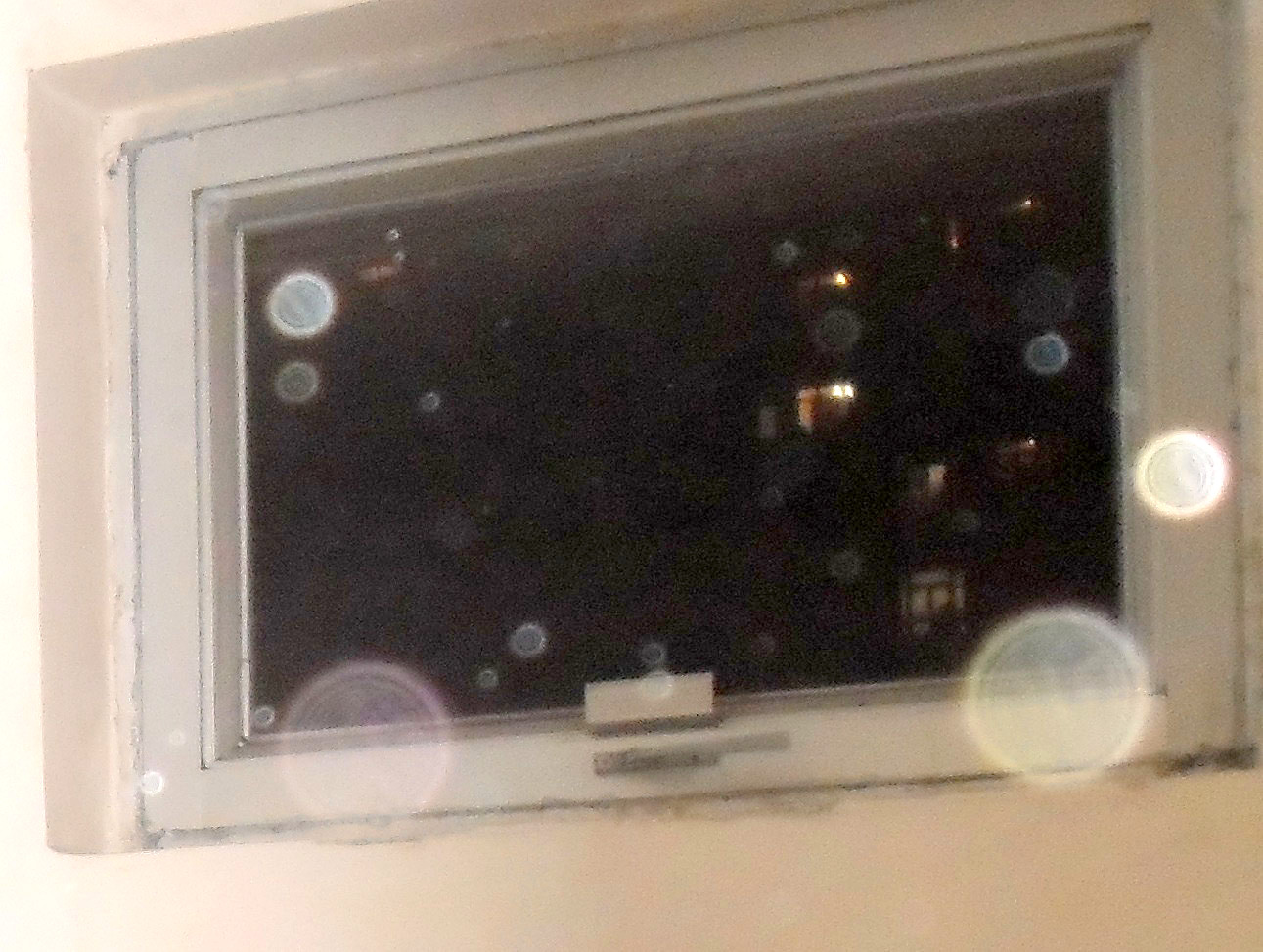
The backscatter of the camera's flash by motes of dust causes unfocused orb-shaped photographic artifacts.

In photography, backscatter (also called near-camera reflection) is an optical phenomenon resulting in typically circular artifacts on an image, due to the camera's flash being reflected from unfocused motes of dust, water droplets, or other particles in the air or water. It is especially common with modern compact and ultra-compact digital cameras.

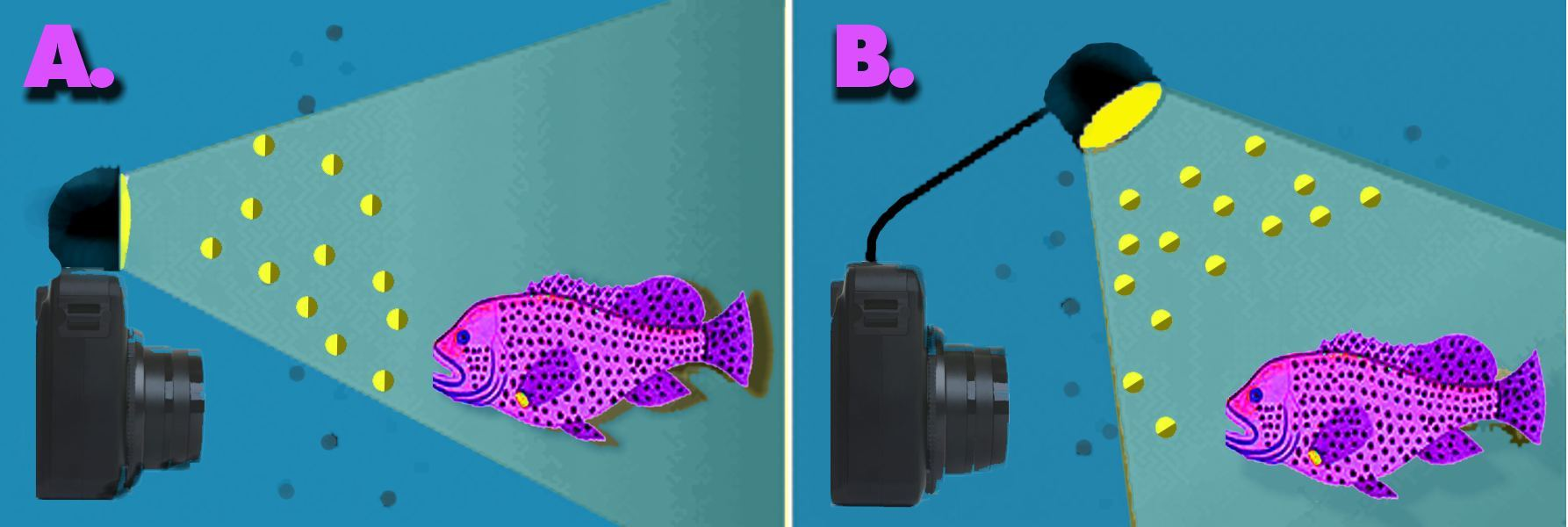
A hypothetical underwater instance with two conditions in which circular photographic artifacts are likely (A) and unlikely (B), depending on whether the aspect of particles facing the lens are directly reflect the flash, as shown. Elements are not shown to scale.

Caused by the backscatter of light by unfocused particles, these artifacts are also sometimes called orbs, referring to a common paranormal claim. Some appear with trails, suggesting motion.

== Cause ==
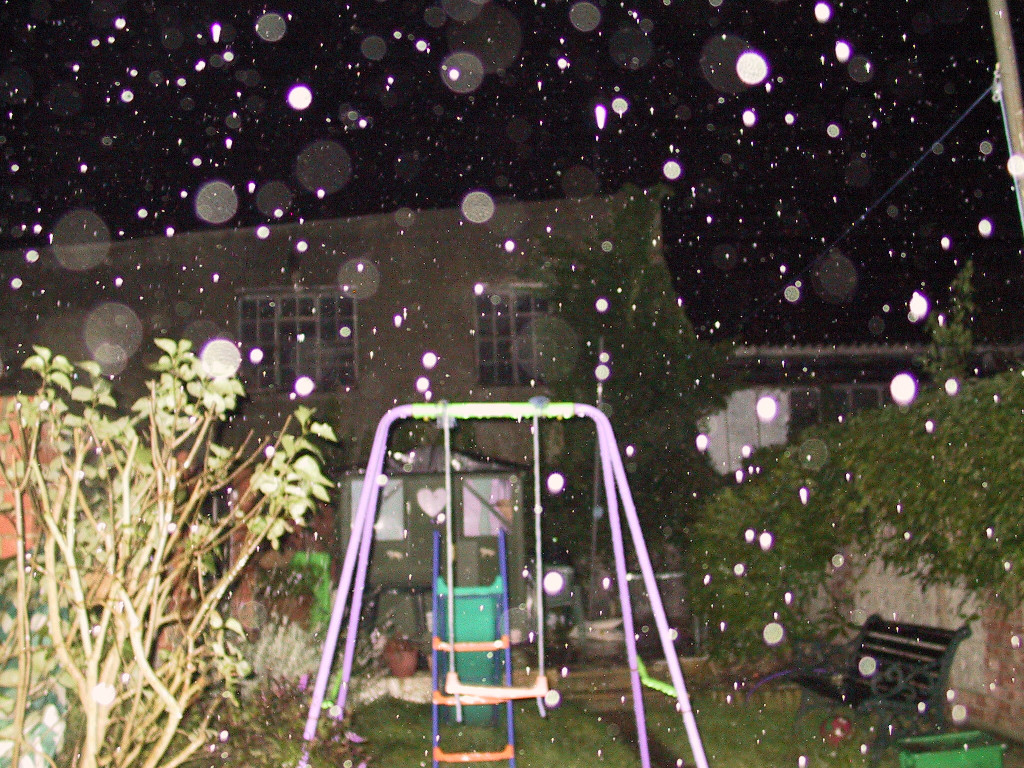
Circular unfocused visual artifacts caused by raindrops.

Backscatter commonly occurs in low-light scenes when the camera's flash is used. Cases include nighttime and underwater photography, when a bright light source and reflective unfocused particles are near the camera. Light appears much brighter very near the source due to the inverse-square law, which says light intensity is inversely proportional to the square of the distance from the source.

The artifact can result from the backscatter or retroreflection of the light from airborne solid particles, such as dust or pollen, or liquid droplets, especially rain or mist. They can also be caused by foreign material within the camera lens. The image artifacts usually appear as either white or semi-transparent circles, though may also occur with whole or partial color spectra, purple fringing or other chromatic aberration. With rain droplets, an image may capture light passing through the droplet creating a small rainbow effect.

Fujifilm describes the artifacts as a common photographic problem:

There is always a certain amount of dust floating around in the air. You may have noticed this at the movies when you look up at the light coming from the movie projector and notice the bright sparks floating around in the beam. In the same way, there are always dust particles floating around nearby when you take pictures with your camera. When you use the flash, the light from the flash reflects off the dust particles and is sometimes captured in your shot. Of course, dust particles very close to the camera are blurred since they are not in focus, but because they reflect the light more strongly than the more distant main subject of the shot, that reflected light can sometimes be captured by the camera and recorded on the resulting image as round white spots. So these dots are the blurred images of dust particles.

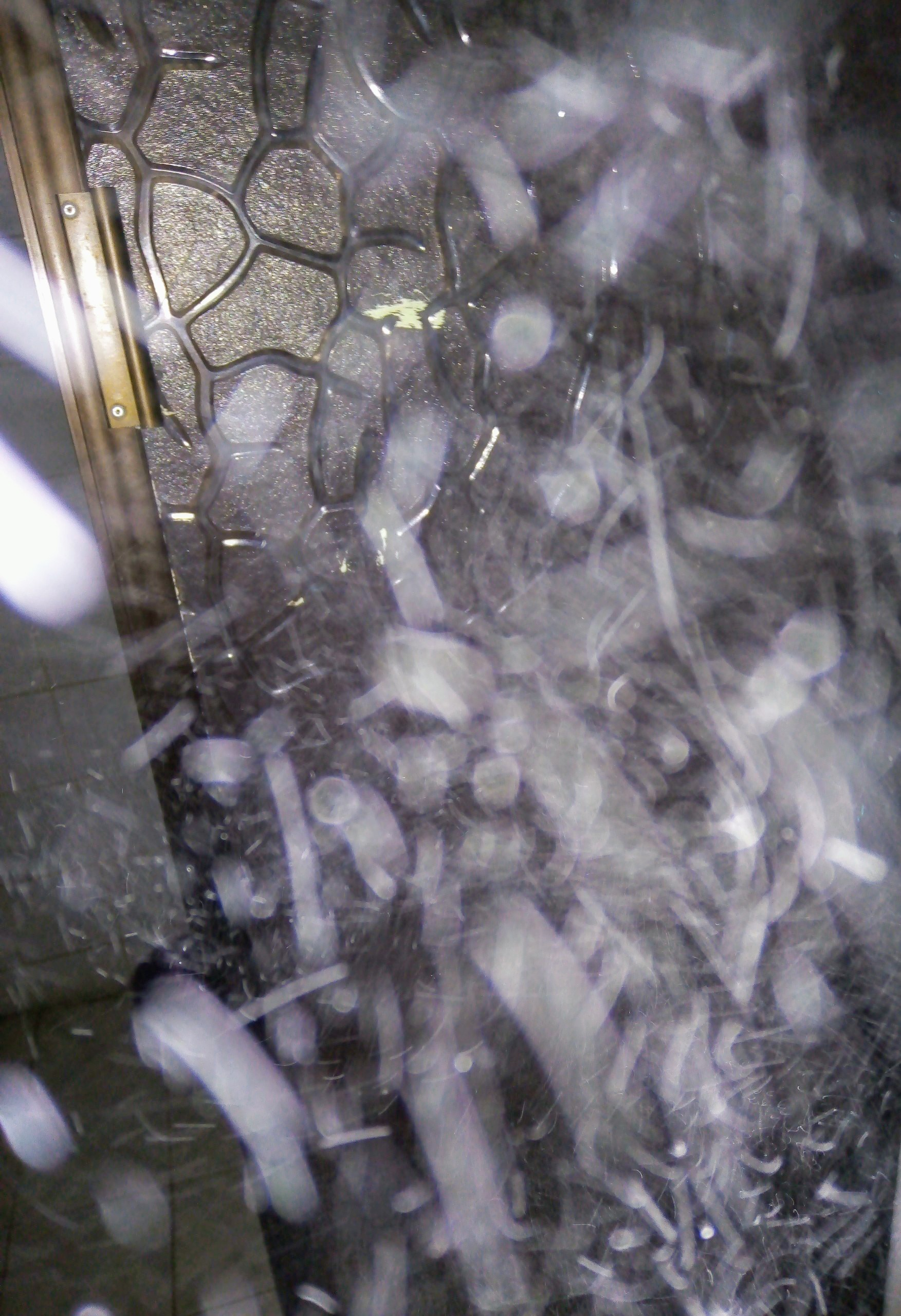
Dust particles reflected by a smartphone flash.

In underwater scenes, particles such as sand or planktonic marine life near the lens, invisible to the diver, reflect light from the flash causing the orb artifact in the image. A strobe flash, which distances the flash from the lens, eliminates the artifacts. The effect is also seen on infrared video cameras, where superbright infrared LEDs illuminate microscopic particles very close to the lens. The artifacts are especially common with compact or ultra-compact cameras, where the short distance between the lens and the built-in flash decreases the angle of light reflection toward the lens, directly illuminating the aspect of the particles facing the lens and increasing the camera's ability to capture the light reflected from normally subvisible particles.

== Paranormal claims ==
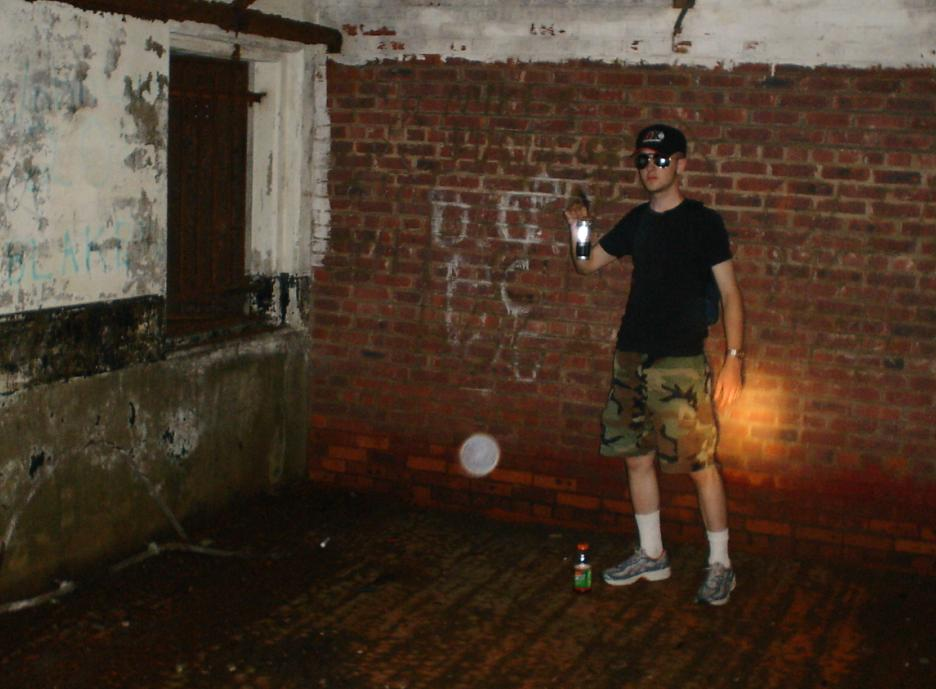
A single orb in the center of the photo, at the person's knee level

Some ghost hunters have claimed that orb shaped visual artifacts appearing in photographs are spirits of the dead. Such perceptions have been interpreted by Michael Shermer as examples of agenticity. Prominent paranormal investigators such as Joe Nickell have agreed with skeptic-debunkers' assessments that orbs result from natural phenomena like insects, dust, pollen, or water droplets.

== See also ==
- Bokeh
- Digital artifact
- Entoptic phenomenon
- Lens flare
- Rod (optical phenomenon)
- Rolling shutter
- Will-o'-the-wisp
