= Up Your Alley (film) =

- Theatrical release poster
- Directed by: Bob Logan
- Written by: Murray Langston; Bob Logan
- Produced by: Murray Langston
- Starring: Murray Langston; Linda Blair
- Cinematography: Mark Melville
- Edited by: Tom Siiter
- Music by: Paul Ventimiglia
- Release date: 1989
- Country: United States

Up Your Alley is a 1989 romantic comedy film directed by Bob Logan and starring Linda Blair. The screenplay was by Logan and Murray Langston (better known as the Unknown Comic), who also co-stars.

== Premise ==
While pursuing a story on homelessness, an undercover reporter (Blair) finds romance with a transient (Langston).

== Cast ==
- Linda Blair as Vickie Adderly
- Murray Langston as David
- Ruth Buzzi as Marilyn
- Bob Zany as Sonny Griffin
- Jesus "Jose" Escamilla as Rudy

== Release ==
The film was released in the United States on April 1, 1989 and secured a VHS release on August 10, 1989.
