= Bob Zany =

American stand-up comedian and actor (born 1961)

- Born: Robert Earl Tetreault; September 11, 1961 (age 65); U.S.
- Notable work: Frequent Guest on The Bob & Tom Show

Comedy career
- Years active: 1976–present
- Medium: Stand-up, television, radio
- Website: BobZany.com

Bob Zany (born Robert Earl Tetreault; September 11, 1961) is an American stand-up comedian and actor. He is known for performing with his trademark cigar on stage.

== Career ==
In 1976, he appeared as a contestant on The Gong Show. Between that time and a 1986 appearance on the TV special George Schlatter's Comedy Club, he had gained a significant amount of weight, which he was able to lose by the time he appeared as a contestant on To Tell the Truth in 1990.

In the 1980s Zany was a frequent guest on Frazer Smith's morning show on 95.5 KLOS in Los Angeles.

Zany is an occasional guest on the nationally syndicated radio program The Bob & Tom Show, and has his own segment called The Zany Report. In recent years, he has also guest-hosted portions of Jerry Lewis' Labor Day Telethon.

Zany also had a small role in the film Joe Dirt as the guy at the radio station who pushes Joe down at the beginning of the movie.

On September 16, 2006, he appeared on the Comedy Central special, The Friends of the Bob and Tom Show.

In June, 2007, he appeared on Last Comic Standing. He passed the initial interview, but was not advanced to the next round.

Zany appeared in the Steven Soderbergh film The Informant, released September 18, 2009. The movie is a dark comedy about a Decatur, Illinois, agri-business giant's price-fixing scandal, and the bipolar whistleblower, Mark Whitacre, who is portrayed by Matt Damon. Zany plays Whitacre's lawyer, John Dowd, in the comedian-rich cast.

In June 2010 Zany toured Israel with the Comedy for Koby show, hosted by the Koby Mandell Foundation. Zany performed in Jerusalem, Tel Aviv, Raanana, Beit Shemesh, Haifa, Modi'in and Gush Etzion.

Zany is slated to star in the documentary film Close But No Cigar, directed by Jay Kanzler, which chronicles his thirty-plus years in show business. The documentary has not yet been released, but is expected to contain interviews with Ralphie May, Jimmy Pardo, Andy Kindler, Nia Peeples, Carrot Top, Rick Messina, and others.

Zany is a 1979 graduate of West Covina High School and lives in Los Angeles.

He is a three-time nominee for Annual American Comedy Awards Best Male Standup Comic.

== Filmography ==
| Year | Title | Role | Notes |
|---|---|---|---|
| 1989 | Up Your Alley | Sonny Griffin | |
| 1990 | Repossessed | Man on Studio Tour | |
| 1992 | The Adventures of Babyman | | |
| 1996 | I Crave Rock & Roll | | |
| 2001 | Joe Dirt | Man | |
| 2009 | The Informant | John Dowd | |
| 2012 | 23 Minutes to Sunrise | Ted | |
