= W248AW =

Radio station translator

Simulcasts WOLT-HD2, Indianapolis
- Indianapolis, Indiana; United States
- Broadcast area: Indianapolis, Indiana
- Frequency: 97.5 MHz
- Branding: Business News 97.5FM

Programming
- Format: Business news
- Affiliations: Bloomberg Radio; WXIN/WTTV (local news and weather)

Ownership
- Owner: Educational Media Foundation
- Operator: iHeartMedia
- Sister stations: WFBQ, WNDE, WOLT, WZRL

History
- First air date: 2004
- Call sign meaning: (serially assigned)

Technical information
- Licensing authority: FCC
- Facility ID: 140551
- Class: D
- ERP: 150 watts
- HAAT: 272 meters (892 ft)
- Transmitter coordinates: 39°53′39.90″N 86°12′21.00″W
- Translator: relay of WOLT-FM-HD2

Links
- Public license information: Public file; LMS
- Webcast: Listen Live
- Website: businessnews975fm.iheart.com

W248AW is a commercial FM radio station translator in Indianapolis, Indiana, broadcasting at 97.5 FM. Owned by the Educational Media Foundation and operated under LMA by iHeartMedia, the station simulcasts a business news format on WOLT's HD2 subchannel, known as "Business News 97.5". Studios are located on Fall Creek Road with transmitter on the northwest side of Indianapolis, near Meridian Hills.

Prior to the format change, the station served as a relay for AM station WNDE.

== History ==
The translator signed on in 2004 under the ownership of the Educational Media Foundation (EMF), and was sold to iHeartMedia in 2015. The format, following the sale, was changed to a relay of Fox Sports Radio affiliated WNDE, branded as "Fox Sports Radio 97.5 FM/1260 AM". Around this time, WNDE also picked up the Rush Limbaugh Show after Emmis Communications-owned WIBC dropped the show.

On July 22, 2019, iHeartMedia dropped the simulcast of WNDE, airing a looped message informing listeners to change to 1260 AM for Fox Sports Radio programming. Later, on August 7, iHeartMedia had announced that W248AW, alongside 12 other translators, would be swapped to the Educational Media Foundation, in exchange for 6 translators that iHeartMedia had been leasing from EMF. This would reunite the translator under its original EMF ownership, though it does not relay an EMF station, as most of EMF's stations air non-commercial Christian-oriented formats.

On August 15, 2019, at 5:00 p.m., W248AW launched a Top 40/CHR format under the name "97.5 KISS FM", airing commercial-free as part of the station's launch. The station will continue to be operated by iHeartMedia, despite the EMF sale. The sale to EMF closed on April 1.

In May 2020, iHeartMedia quietly dropped the KISS FM format, with 97.5 becoming a Bloomberg Radio affiliate afterwards.
