= WNDE =

Radio station in Indianapolis, Indiana

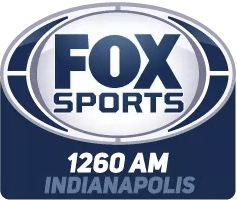
- Indianapolis, Indiana; United States
- Broadcast area: Indianapolis metropolitan area
- Frequency: 1260 kHz
- Branding: Fox Sports 1260

Programming
- Format: Sports
- Affiliations: Fox Sports Radio; NBC News Radio; Indianapolis Indians; Purdue Boilermakers

Ownership
- Owner: iHeartMedia, Inc.; (iHM Licenses, LLC)
- Sister stations: WFBQ; WOLT; WZRL; W248AW

History
- First air date: October 23, 1924 (as WFBM)
- Former call signs: WFBM (1924–73)
- Former frequencies: 1130 kHz (1924–27); 1330 kHz (1927–28); 1090 kHz (1928–29); 1230 kHz (1929–41)
- Call sign meaning: Pronounced as "Indy"

Technical information
- Licensing authority: FCC
- Facility ID: 59591
- Class: B
- Power: 5,000 watts
- Transmitter coordinates: 39°51′54.1″N 86°3′42.9″W
- Repeater: 94.7 WFBQ-HD2 (Indianapolis)

Links
- Public license information: Public file; LMS
- Webcast: Listen live (via iHeartRadio)
- Website: foxsportsindy.com

WNDE (1260 AM) is a commercial radio station in Indianapolis, Indiana. It is owned by iHeartMedia with the broadcast license held by iHM Licenses, LLC. WNDE broadcasts a sports radio format, with some afternoon talk programs, including The Clay Travis and Buck Sexton Show.

WNDE is powered at 5,000 watts. By day, it uses a non-directional antenna. But at night, to protect other stations on 1260 AM from interference, it switches to a directional antenna with a three-tower array. The transmitter is off Fall Creek Road in Indianapolis. Programming is also heard on the HD Radio digital subchannel of co-owned WFBQ 94.7 FM.

== History ==
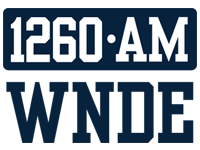
Former WNDE logo, prior to 2015.

=== WFBM ===
The station signed on with the sequentially assigned call letters WFBM on October 23, 1924. It is the oldest radio station still operating in Indianapolis, and third oldest in the state of Indiana. It was started by the Merchants Heating & Light Co., later Indianapolis Power & Light. In its early years, it broadcast on 1130 kHz. In 1927, it moved to 1330 kHz, then to 1090 kHz in 1928, and to 1230 kHz in 1929. It arrived at its current frequency after the enactment of the North American Regional Broadcasting Agreement (NARBA) in 1941, when all stations in the United States at 1230 kHz were moved to 1260 kHz.

In 1949, WFBM-TV went on the air in time to broadcast the 1949 Indianapolis 500 (May 30, 1949). The WFBM "family" grew on November 26, 1959, when WFBM-FM went on the air at 94.7 MHz. In 1957, WFBM-AM-FM-TV were sold Time Inc., who later subordinated their acquisition under its in 1961 established subsidiary Time-Life, Inc. as Time–Life Broadcasting, Inc. McGraw-Hill bought the stations in 1972, renamed the television station WRTV, and almost immediately put the radio stations on the market. The WFBM stations had been grandfathered when the FCC banned common ownership of television and radio stations, but lost that protection with the McGraw-Hill purchase.

=== WNDE ===
In 1973, WFBM became WNDE, followed by WFBM-FM becoming WFBQ in early 1974. The WNDE call letters were chosen as the letters "NDE" phonetically sound like "Indy".

Through much of the 1960s and 1970s, WNDE had a Top 40 format, using the identifier "Windy Twelve Sixty". WNDE and WIFE (1310 AM), had a spirited competition for youthful Top 40 listeners. But in the 1980s, contemporary music listening switched to the FM dial. For the first half of the 1980s, WNDE played oldies, with a focus on rock and roll from the 1950s and early 1960s.

WNDE needed to find a new format and eventually it switched to sports radio.

=== Sports radio ===
WNDE has been a Fox Sports Radio network affiliate since 2002. It had previously been an ESPN Radio affiliate on two occasions. In September 2012, the network switched from Fox Sports Radio to NBC Sports Radio in the 10 p.m.-5 a.m. weekday hours, remaining with Fox in other dayparts. Former hosts of the afternoon drive local show include former WISH-TV sports anchor and Hoosier Millionaire host Mark Patrick, the team of Tim Bragg & Bill Benner, Indiana Pacers announcer Mark Boyle, JMV (John Michael Vincent, currently with WFNI), IndyCar Radio announcer Jake Query, and Derek Schultz.

Former WNDE logo, from 2015 to 2019.

On July 7, 2015, WNDE added W248AW, an FM translator on 97.5 MHz. On July 22, 2019, the translator ended its simulcast. The next month, iHeart announced it was returning the translator originally owned by Christian radio company Educational Media Foundation back to that organization as part of a translator trade.

== Programming ==
Most programming comes from the Fox Sports Radio network. In late mornings, it carries Premiere Networks' The Dan Patrick Show. Unusually for a sports radio station, it carries The Clay Travis and Buck Sexton Show from noon to 3 p.m. weekdays. Travis & Sexton are followed by a two-hour financial talk show. Sports programming resumes at 5 p.m. on weekdays.

WNDE's long-running local afternoon drive time show, "Query & Schultz", hosted by Jake Query and Derek Schultz, aired from 2011 to 2020. Query and Schultz were released in January 2020 as part of iHeart's cut backs. The 2020 iHeartMedia reduction in force (RIF) impacted over 1,000 employees across the USA. WNDE has not had a local sports talk show in any daypart since.

On July 6, 2015, WNDE became the Indianapolis outlet for The Rush Limbaugh Show, which had been on WIBC for over two decades but whose carriage was ended for local programming. Coinciding with iHeart taking the show in-house to WNDE (the only choice it had locally due to incompatible music formats on iHeart's three other FM stations in the market), the company also acquired FM translator station W248AW 97.5 FM from the Educational Media Foundation to simulcast WNDE. The surrounding sports format did not change. Limbaugh began airing on WNDE the same day as the station rebranded to "Fox Sports 97.5." That FM simulcast ended in 2019 and WNDE became "Fox Sports 1260" (named for the AM frequency). When Limbaugh died in 2020, WNDE retained the replacement Clay Travis and Buck Sexton Show.

WNDE is the Indianapolis outlet for Purdue University football and men's basketball, sharing flagship status with Lafayette's WAZY. It also airs Westwood One's NFL and NCAA football and basketball coverage. After years of broadcasting Cincinnati Reds baseball, WNDE was briefly a part of the Chicago Cubs network in 2009 and 2010. In 2011, WNDE dropped NASCAR programming after many years, and began broadcasting Indianapolis Indians baseball.
