= Manuela Escamilla =

Spanish playwright, stage actress and theatre manager

Manuela Escamilla (1648–1721) was a Spanish playwright, stage actress and theatre manager. She belonged to the playwrights of the Spanish Golden Age. She was the daughter of Francisca Díaz and Antonio Escamilla, a successful actress in 1654–1677 and the manager of her father's theater company in 1683–1690.
