= Rafael Perez-Escamilla =

Mexican-American public health nutritionist

- Born: Mexico

Academic background
- Education: BS, chemical engineering, 1982, Universidad Iberoamericana; MS, 1985, PhD, 1991, University of California, Davis
- Thesis: Effect of the maternity ward system on the lactation success of low-income urban Mexican women (1991)

Academic work
- Institutions: Yale School of Public Health; University of Connecticut

Rafael Pérez-Escamilla Costas is a Mexican-American public health nutritionist. He is a Full professor in the division of Chronic Disease Epidemiology and director of the Office of Public Health Practice, the Global Health Concentration, and the Maternal Child Health Promotion program at Yale School of Public Health.

During his tenure at UConn and Yale, Pérez-Escamilla has served as a scientific expert advisor for the World Health Organization, UNICEF FAO, the Robert Wood Johnson Foundation, the National Academies of Sciences, Engineering, and Medicine, the United States Department of Agriculture, and the Bill & Melinda Gates Foundation.

== Early life and education ==
Pérez-Escamilla completed his Bachelor of Science degree in chemical engineering from the Universidad Iberoamericana and his master's degree and PhD from the University of California, Davis.

== Career ==
Following his PhD, Pérez-Escamilla became an assistant professor of nutritional sciences and public health at the University of Connecticut (UConn). During his short tenure there, Pérez-Escamilla founded the Connecticut Center for Eliminating Health Disparities among Latinos. In 2008, he was appointed to the national 2010 Dietary Guidelines Advisory Committee by then-United States Secretary of Agriculture Ed Schafer and United States Secretary of Health and Human Services Mike Leavitt.

Pérez-Escamilla eventually left UConn to become a professor in the division of Chronic Disease Epidemiology and director of the Office of Community Health at the Yale School of Public Health. While serving in this role, he co-published the United Nations' Food and Agriculture Organization (FAO) "Latin American and Caribbean Household Food Security Scale" manual. In 2016, Pérez-Escamilla addressed the Brazilian Senate on the topic of "Food Insecurity, Human Development, and Planetary Health."

During his tenure at UConn and Yale, Pérez-Escamilla has served as a scientific expert advisor for the World Health Organization, UNICEF FAO, the Robert Wood Johnson Foundation, the National Academies of Sciences, Engineering, and Medicine, the United States Department of Agriculture, and the Bill & Melinda Gates Foundation. As a result of his global impact for having developed, led, and implemented pioneering programs in public health nutrition, Pérez-Escamilla was elected a Member of the National Academy of Medicine. The following year, he was also inducted into the Connecticut Academy of Science for "being a world authority on community-based maternal, infant, and young child feeding programs and assessment of food security, and international recognition for his research on breastfeeding peer counseling programs."
