= Rod (optical phenomenon) =

Elongated visual artifacts appearing in media

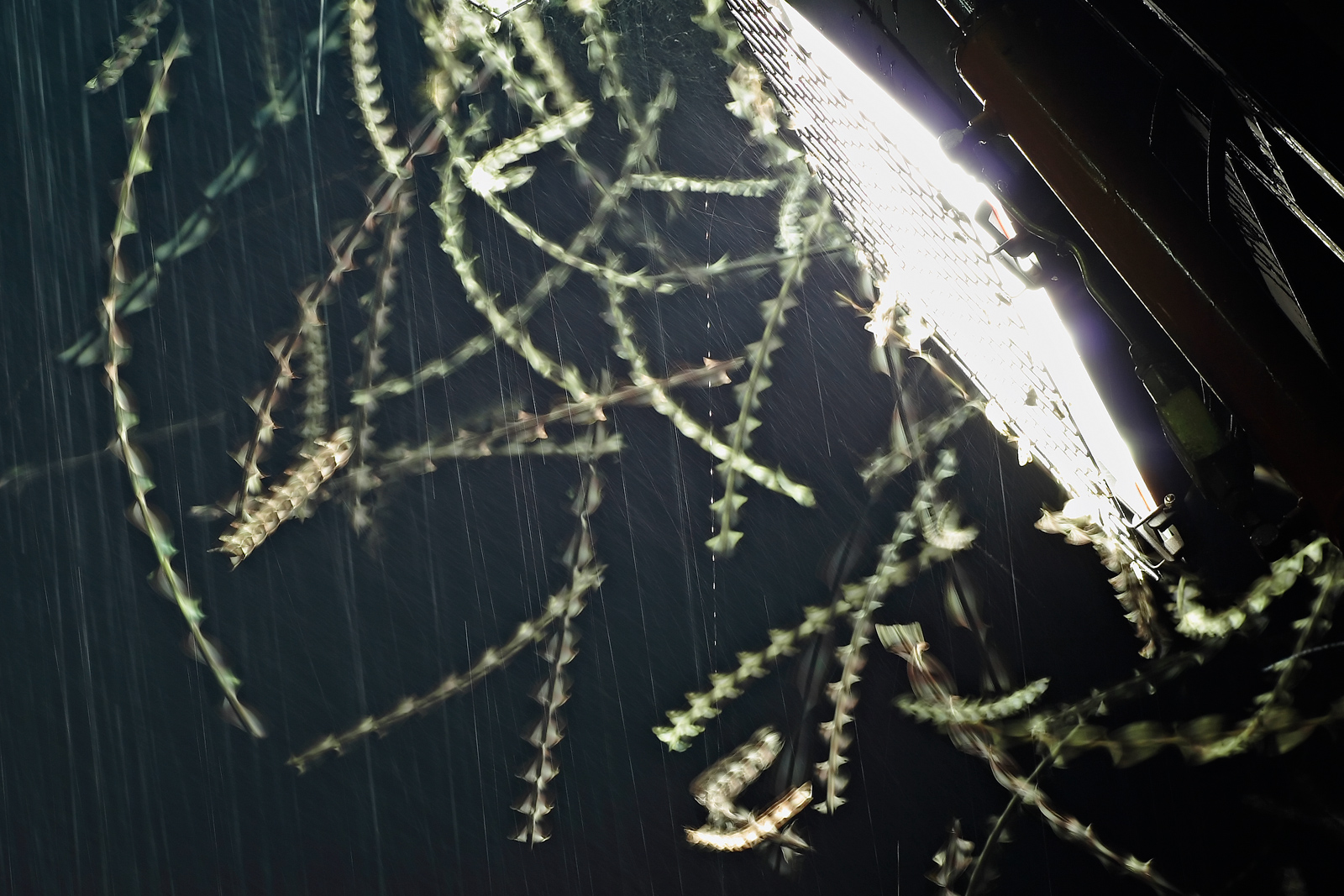
This long-exposure photograph of moths flying around a floodlight shows an exaggerated "rod" effect.

In cryptozoology and ufology, "rods" (also known as "skyfish", "air rods", or "solar entities") are elongated visual artifacts appearing in photographic images and video recordings.

Most optical analyses to date have concluded that the images are insects moving across the frame as the photo is being captured, although some cryptozoologists and ufologists still claim that they are paranormal in nature.

== Paranormal claims ==
Various paranormal interpretations of this phenomenon appear in popular culture. One of the more outspoken proponents of rods as alien life forms was José Escamilla, a musician and filmmaker, who claimed to have been the first to film them on 19 March 1994 in Roswell, New Mexico, while attempting to capture footage of a UFO. Escamilla later made additional videos and embarked on lecture tours to promote his claims.

== Optical analysis ==
Robert Todd Carroll (2003), having consulted entomologist Doug Yanega, identified the rod phenomenon as a visual artifact resulting from recording insects at certain camera settings. If the frequency of an insect's wing beats exceeds the frame rate or shutter speed of a recording device, this can result in periodic bulges and dramatic motion blur respectively, lending to the illusion of a rod.

A 2000 report by staff at The Straight Dope also offered a similar explanation, namely that the phenomena are explainable as tricks of light that result from how (primarily video) images of flying insects are recorded and played back, adding that investigators have shown the rodlike bodies to be a motion blur artifact caused by a camera shooting with relatively long exposure times.

The claim that this phenomenon represents extraordinary, possibly alien, creatures has been widely dismissed.

In August 2005, China Central Television (CCTV) aired a two-part documentary about rods that reported on an experiment conducted at the Tonghua Zhenguo Pharmaceutical Company in Tonghua City, Jilin Province, the results of which strongly corroborated the entomological hypothesis. Surveillance cameras at the facility captured footage of visual artifacts identical to those featured in José Escamilla's video. An investigator from the World Chinese UFO Sightings Association attempted to trap the rods by installing large nets. The surveillance cameras proceeded to capture images of rods flying into the trap and, when the nets were subsequently inspected, only moths and other ordinary flying insects were found. Subsequent investigations provided clear indication that the appearance of flying rods on video was an optical illusion caused by insect movement exceeding camera settings.

After attending a lecture by José Escamilla, UFO investigator Robert Sheaffer wrote that "some of his 'rods' were obviously insects zipping across the field at a high angular rate" and others appeared to be "appendages" which were birds' wings blurred by the camera exposure.

== See also ==
- Optical phenomena
- Orb (optics)
