= Bob Odenkirk on stage and screen =

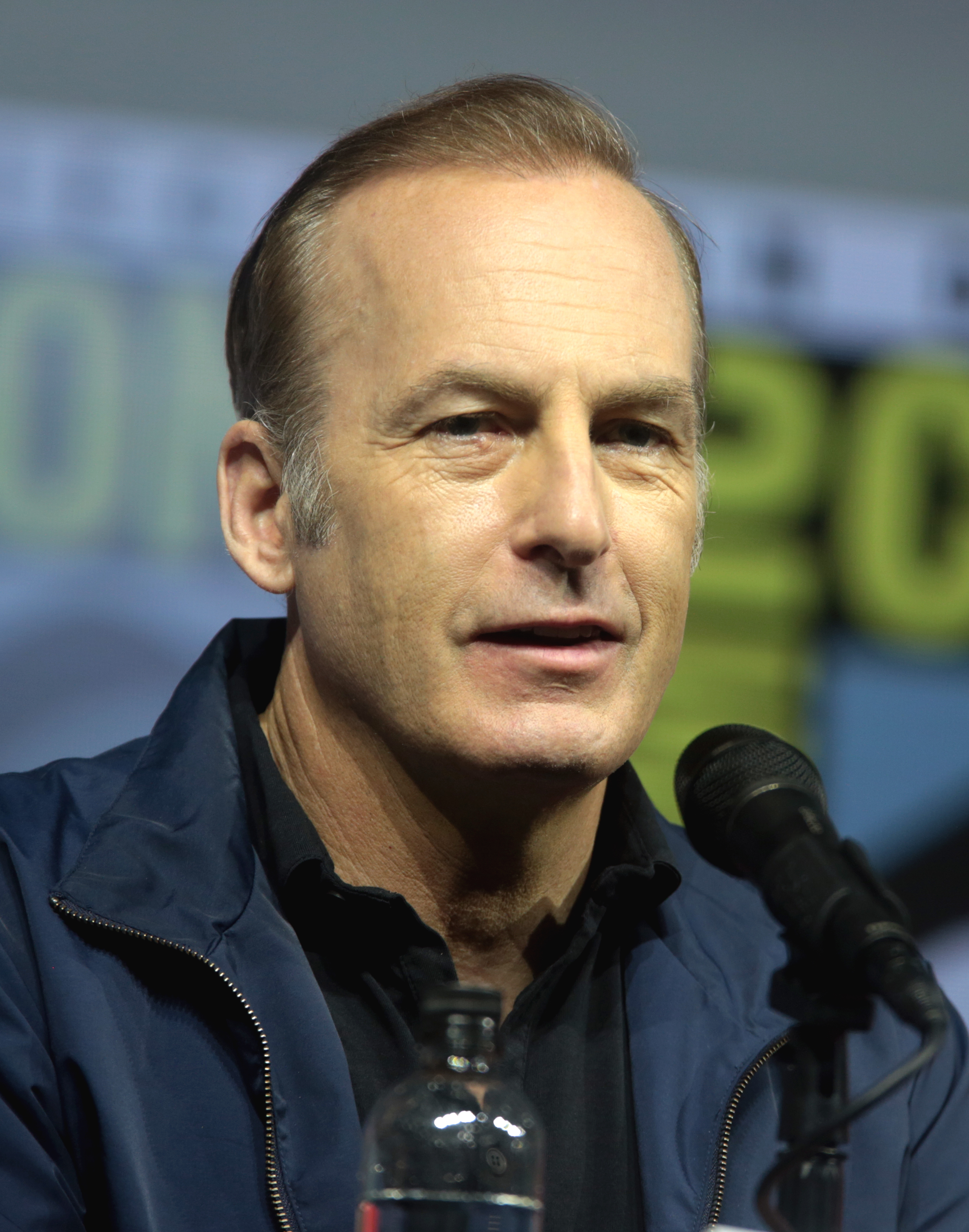
Odenkirk at San Diego Comic-Con in July 2018

Robert John Odenkirk (born October 22, 1962) is an American actor, comedian and filmmaker, best known for his role as Saul Goodman on the AMC crime drama series Breaking Bad and its spin-off Better Call Saul. He directed three films, Melvin Goes to Dinner (2003), Let's Go to Prison (2006), and The Brothers Solomon (2007). He was also an executive producer of the sketch comedy show The Birthday Boys.

From the late 1980s to 1990s, Odenkirk wrote for television shows Saturday Night Live and The Ben Stiller Show.

== Film ==
Key
†	Denotes films that have not yet been released

Year	Title	Role	Notes
1993	Wayne's World 2	Concert Nerd	
1994	Clean Slate	Cop	
1996	The Truth About Cats & Dogs	Bookstore Man	
1996	The Cable Guy	Pete Kovacs	
1996	Waiting for Guffman	Caped Man at Audition	Deleted scene
1997	Hacks	Cellmate	
1999	Can't Stop Dancing	Simpson	
2000	The Independent	Figure	
2001	Dr. Dolittle 2	Animal Groupie #4 / Forest Animal / Dog	Voice
2001	Monkeybone	Head Surgeon	
2002	Run Ronnie Run!	Terry Twillstein / Various	Also writer
2003	Melvin Goes to Dinner	Keith	Also director
2004	My Big Fat Independent Movie	Steve	
2005	Sarah Silverman: Jesus Is Magic	Manager	
2005	Cake Boy	Darnell Hawk	
2006	Danny Roane: First Time Director	Pete Kesselmen	
2006	Relative Strangers	Mitch Clayton	
2006	Let's Go to Prison	Duane	Also director
2007	The Brothers Solomon	Jim Treacher	Also director
2007	Super High Me	Bob	Documentary
2009	Operation: Endgame	Emperor	
2010	Blood into Wine	French Winemaker	Documentary
2011	Son of Morning	Fred Charles	
2011	Take Me Home Tonight	Mike	
2012	Tim and Eric's Billion Dollar Movie	Schlaaang Announcer	Voice cameo
2012	The Giant Mechanical Man	Mark	
2013	Ass Backwards	Pageant MC	
2013	Dealin' with Idiots	Coach Jimbo	
2013	The Spectacular Now	Dan	
2013	Movie 43	P.I.	Also uncredited director; segment: "Find Our Daughter"
2013	Nebraska	Ross Grant	
2014	Boulevard	Winston	
2015	I Am Chris Farley	Himself	Documentary
2015	Hell and Back	The Devil	Voice
2015	Freaks of Nature	Shooter Parker	
2017	Girlfriend's Day	Ray Wentworth	Also writer and producer
2017	The Disaster Artist	Stanislavski Teacher	Cameo
2017	The Post	Ben Bagdikian	
2018	Incredibles 2	Winston Deavor	Voice
2019	Long Shot	President Chambers	
2019	Dolemite Is My Name	Lawrence Woolner	Uncredited
2019	Little Women	Father Robert March	
2021	Nobody	Hutch Mansell	Also producer
2021	Halloween Kills	Bob Simms	Photo cameo
2022	Life Upside Down	Jonathan Wigglesworth	
2022	The People's Joker	Bob the Goon	Voice cameo
2025	Nobody 2	Hutch Mansell	Also producer and writer of additional material
2025	Normal	Ulysses	Also producer and story writer
2025	The Room Returns!	Johnny	
2026	Bob and David Climb Machu Picchu	Himself	Documentary; also producer
2026	SCTV: The Greatest Show You've Never Heard Of	Himself	Documentary

== Television ==
Year	Title	Role	Notes
1987–1991	Saturday Night Live	Various roles	13 episodes; also writer
1991–1992	Get a Life	—N/a	Writer
1992	The Dennis Miller Show	—N/a	Writer
1992	The Ben Stiller Show	Various roles	13 episodes; also writer
1993	The Jackie Thomas Show	Elmer	Episode: "Aloha, Io-wahu"
1993	Roseanne	Jim	Episode: "Tooth or Consequences"
1993–1998	The Larry Sanders Show	Steve Grant	11 episodes
1993–1994	Late Night with Conan O'Brien	—N/a	Writer
1994	Tom	David	Episode: "The Bad Seed"
1994	Life on Mars	Bob	Pilot; also creator and writer
1995–1998	Mr. Show with Bob and David	Various roles	30 episodes; also co-creator, writer and executive producer
1996	Dr. Katz, Professional Therapist	Bob	Voice; episode: "Fructose"
1996	Seinfeld	Ben	Episode: "The Abstinence"
1996	The Dana Carvey Show	—N/a	Writer
1997–1998	NewsRadio	Dr. Smith / Bob	2 episodes
1997, 2001	Everybody Loves Raymond	Scott Preman	2 episodes
1997–2000	Tenacious D	—N/a	Co-creator, writer and executive producer
1997	Space Ghost Coast to Coast	Himself	Episode: "Gallagher"
1999	Just Shoot Me!	Barry	Episode: "The Odd Couple: Part 1"
1999	3rd Rock from the Sun	Gary Parkinson	Episode: "The Fifth Solomon"
2000	Curb Your Enthusiasm	Gil	Episode: "Porno Gil"
2000	The Near Future	—N/a	Pilot; co-creator, director, writer and executive producer
2001	Ed	Rev. Richie Porter	Episode: "Valentine's Day"
2001	The Andy Dick Show	Chuck Charles	Episode: "Standards and Practices"
2002	Next!	Various roles	Pilot; also co-creator, writer and executive producer
2003	Highway to Oblivion	—N/a	Pilot; director
2003	Less than Perfect	Colin Hunter	Episode: "The New Guy"
2003	Futurama	Chaz	Voice; episode: "The Why of Fry"
2003	The Big Wide World of Carl Laemke	Carl Laemke	Pilot; also creator, writer and executive producer
2003	Slice o' Life	(Role unknown)	Pilot
2003	Arrested Development	Dr. Phil Gunty	Episode: "Visiting Ours"
2004	Joey	Brian Michael David Scott	Episode: "Joey and the Nemesis"
2004	Aqua Teen Hunger Force	Bean Wizard	Voice; episode: "Hypno-Germ"
2004–2006	Tom Goes to the Mayor	Various roles	21 episodes; also writer and executive producer
2005	Crank Yankers	Droopy	Voice; episode: "#3.14"
2006	Freak Show	Half Oldman Half Youngman / Senator Tinkerbell	Voice; 2 episodes
2007–2010	Tim and Eric Awesome Show, Great Job!	Various roles	25 episodes; also creative consultant
2007	The Sarah Silverman Program	Mister Wadsworth	Episode: "Maid to Border"
2007	Derek and Simon: The Show	Vance Hammersly	3 episodes; also co-creator, writer, director and executive producer
2008–2012	How I Met Your Mother	Arthur Hobbs	8 episodes
2008	Weeds	Barry	Episode: "Head Cheese"
2008	Mike Birbiglia's Secret Public Journal	Donnie	Television special
2008	David's Situation	—N/a	Pilot; co-creator, director, writer and executive producer
2009–2013	Breaking Bad	Saul Goodman	36 episodes
2009	American Dad!	Third Worker / TV Host	Voice; 2 episodes
2009	The Goode Family	Brian Kennedy	Voice; episode: "Pleatherheads"
2009	Glenn Martin, DDS	Vince the Circus Owner	Voice; episode: "The Grossest Show on Earth"
2009	Rules of Engagement	Mike	Episode: "Russell's Secret"
2010	The Life & Times of Tim	The Interventionist / Bathroom Attendant	Voice; 2 episodes
2010	Check It Out! with Dr. Steve Brule	—N/a	Creative consultant
2010	Entourage	Ken Austin	3 episodes
2010	Team Spitz	Principal Kersey	Pilot
2010	Funny or Die Presents	Scott & Behr	Episode: "112"
2011	Let's Do This!	Cal	Pilot; also creator, director, writer and executive producer
2011	Jon Benjamin Has a Van	Rev. Rocco Janson	Episode: "Smoking"
2012	NTSF:SD:SUV::	Aaron Sampson	Episode: "Robot Town"
2012	Bob's Burgers	Chase	Voice; episode: "Tina-rannosaurus Wrecks"
2012	The League	Miles Miller	Episode: "A Krampus Carol"
2012–2016	Comedy Bang! Bang!	Various roles	6 episodes
2013	The Office	Mark Franks	Episode: "Moving On"
2013–2018	Drunk History	Various roles	4 episodes
2013	Ghost Ghirls	Frank van Stetten	Episode: "Ghost Writer"
2013	Late Night with Jimmy Fallon	Saul Goodman	Episode: "5.191"
2013–2014	The Birthday Boys	Various roles	11 episodes; also director, writer and executive producer
2014	Fargo	Chief Bill Oswalt	9 episodes
2014	TripTank	Hot Sauce Worker	Voice; episode: "Crossing the Line"
2014	Tim & Eric's Bedtime Stories	Dr. Stork	Episode: "Toes"
2015–2022	Better Call Saul	Jimmy McGill	63 episodes; also producer
2015	W/ Bob & David	Various roles	4 episodes; also co-creator, writer and executive producer
2017	Nobodies	Himself	Episode: "Not the Emmys"
2017–2018, 2021	No Activity	Greg	5 episodes
2019–2022	Undone	Jacob Winograd	16 episodes; also producer
2019	The Simpsons	Mob Lawyer	Voice; episode: "The Fat Blue Line"
2019	The Kominsky Method	Dr. Shenckman	Episode: "Chapter 13. A Shenckman Equivocates"
2020	Corporate	Black Dog	Voice; episode: "Black Dog"
2021	Mom	Hank	Episode: "Tiny Dancer and an Impromptu Picnic"
2021	I Think You Should Leave with Tim Robinson	Man in Diner	Episode: "They have a cake shop there Susan where the cakes just look stunning."
2021–2022	Chicago Party Aunt	Feather	Voice; 12 episodes
2023	Lucky Hank	William Henry "Hank" Devereaux, Jr.	8 episodes; also executive producer
2023–2026	The Bear	Uncle Lee	3 episodes

== Theater ==
Year	Title	Role	Venue
2025	Glengarry Glen Ross	Shelley Levene	Palace Theatre, Broadway
2026	Are You Now or Have You Ever Been	Lionel Stander	New York City Center Stage I, Off-Broadway

== Audio ==
Year	Title	Role	Notes
2022	Summer in Argyle	Various roles	Audible series; also co-creator and writer
2023	'Tis The Grinch Holiday Podcast	Himself	Episode: "No Presents for Thanksgiving! with Bob Odenkirk and Erin Odenkirk"

== Video games ==
Year	Title	Role	Notes
2018	Lego The Incredibles	Winston Deavor	Voice

== Music videos ==
Year	Title	Artist(s)	Role	Ref.
1997	"Sugarcube"	Yo La Tengo	Actor	
2010	"Hindsight"	Built to Spill	Director	
2020	"Eat It (We're All In This Together)"	David Cross featuring "Weird Al" Yankovic	Himself	
2022	"Karaoke"	Beach Bunny	Star Captain	

== Discography ==
Year	Title
2014	Amateur Hour (feat. Brandon Wardell)
