= Jesus "Jose" Escamilla =

American ufologist and film maker (1951–2018)

Jose Escamilla
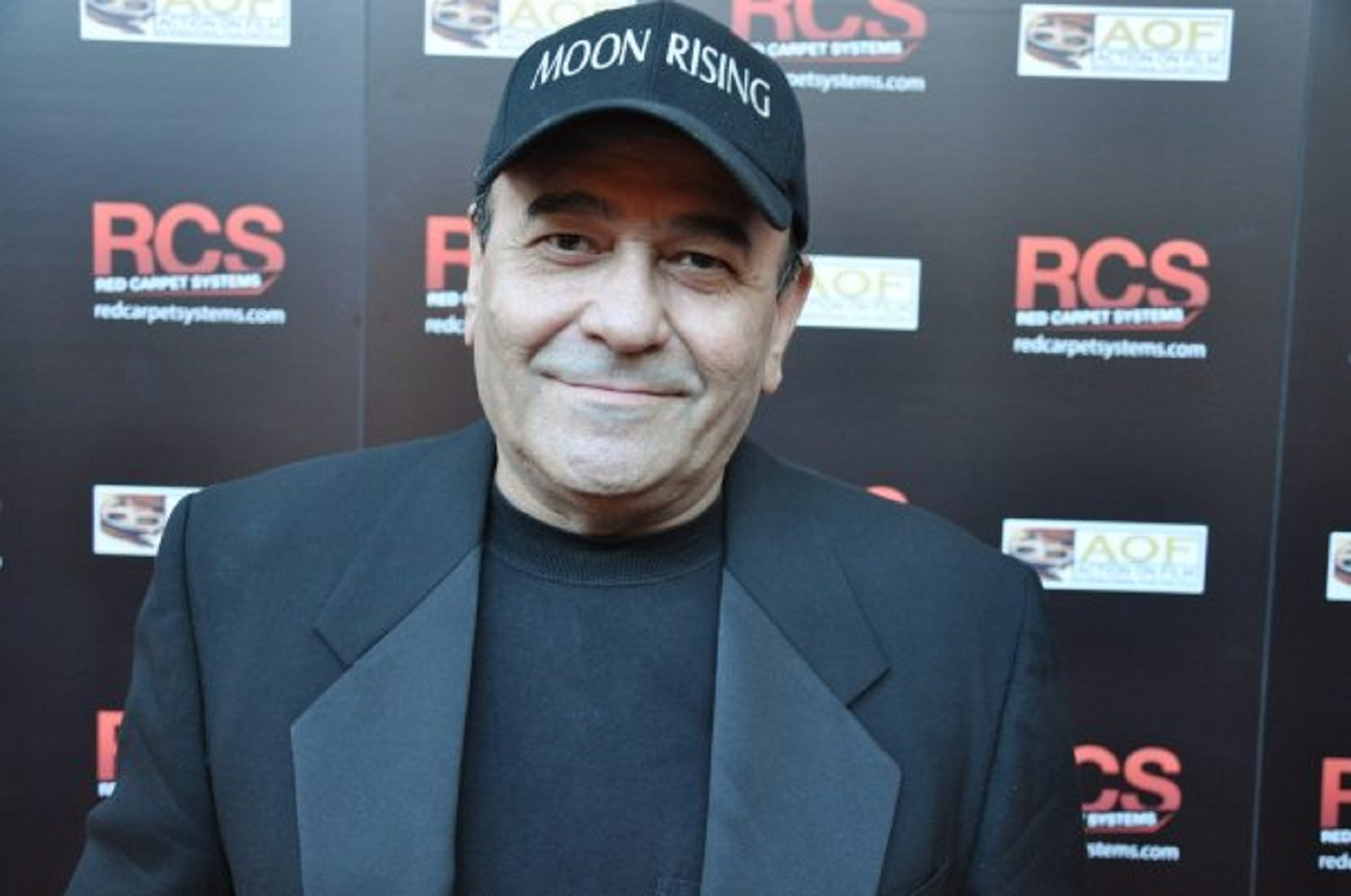
- Jose Escamilla at the RCS' Red Carpet event
- Born: March 25, 1951; Roswell, New Mexico, US
- Died: December 12, 2018 (aged 67); Mission Hills, California, US
- Occupations: UFOlogist, filmmaker
- Years active: 1964-2018

Jose Escamilla born “Jose” Jesus Garza Escamilla (March 25, 1951 – December 12, 2018) was an American filmmaker and UFOlogist.

== Early life ==
Escamilla was born in Roswell, New Mexico on March 25, 1951, to France Garza Solsberry and Jose Escamilla Sr. He has two sisters, Becky and Rose, and one brother Manuel. Escamilla grew up on a ranch south of Roswell and attended Roswell High School. In April of 1967, 16 year-old Escamilla entered a contest held by the Crater Teen Club and won a trip to The Ed Sullivan Show in New York City to petition Paul Revere and the Raiders to reschedule their canceled performance at the Roswell Teen Club.

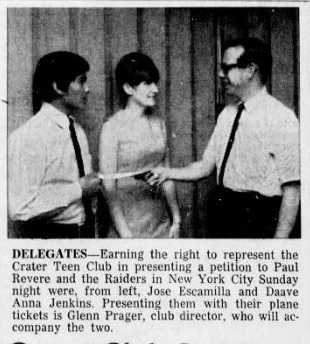
The Crater Teen Club of Roswell, New Mexico

== Entertainment career ==
In May 1970, Escamilla recorded two songs on a single 45 disc, Poor Man's Children and Jan. The record sold 500 copies before being aired on Roswell's KBIM and KKAT radio stations. In 1974 he joined a musical group called the Collection playing piano and guitar.

In 1985 Escamilla composed and sang the title song, One Minute of Peace to honor Samantha Smith, an American peace activist, at the Hollywood Bowl.

In 1989, Escamilla was cast as a background actor in the film Up Your Alley. In 1990, Escamilla produced the cartoon Donny Deinonychus voiced by Ruth Buzzi and Richard Moll.

== UFOlogy ==
In March 1994, Escamilla's sister Becky was camping near Midway, New Mexico when she called Escamilla claiming that "five UFOs came out in broad daylight". According to Becky, Escamilla was reluctant to come at first thinking she was playing a trick on him, but when he arrived, he managed to film 16 minutes of objects in the sky. The Escamilla family's claims of UFO sightings in Midway attracted increased attention. Becky Escamilla told the press that "UFO researchers have estimated the speed of some of the flying objects at 2,000 miles per hour", and claimed "There is no explanation as to why we don't hear them or how they can survive the G-force." The television programs Hard Copy and Encounters featured footage recorded by the Escamillas.

According to Escamilla, when reviewing the films taped in Midway he noticed something other than UFOs, saying that the High-speed camera he used captured something he termed "Sky Fish", also known as the visual artifact "Rods", and claimed it was a newly discovered life form. His footage was later featured on the Discovery Channel of the UK.

In 1994, Roswell, New Mexico's UFO Enigma Museum featured Escamilla's UFO work. Also in 1994, Escamilla promoted a UFO theme park concept as a tourist attraction for the Roswell area and sought funding for the project.

Escamilla produced a number of UFO themed documentary films such as UFOs From Outer Space, ORBS and They Live In The Skies (RODS film)

Escamilla appeared on various radio and television shows discussing Rods, including Coast to Coast AM and MSNBC, as well as being featured in a number of newspaper articles.

== Illness and death ==
In 2015, The Stone Pony hosted a fund raiser in Asbury Park, New Jersey to benefit the hospitalized Escamilla.

Escamilla died on December 12, 2018.
