= Greg Hahn =

American stand-up comedian

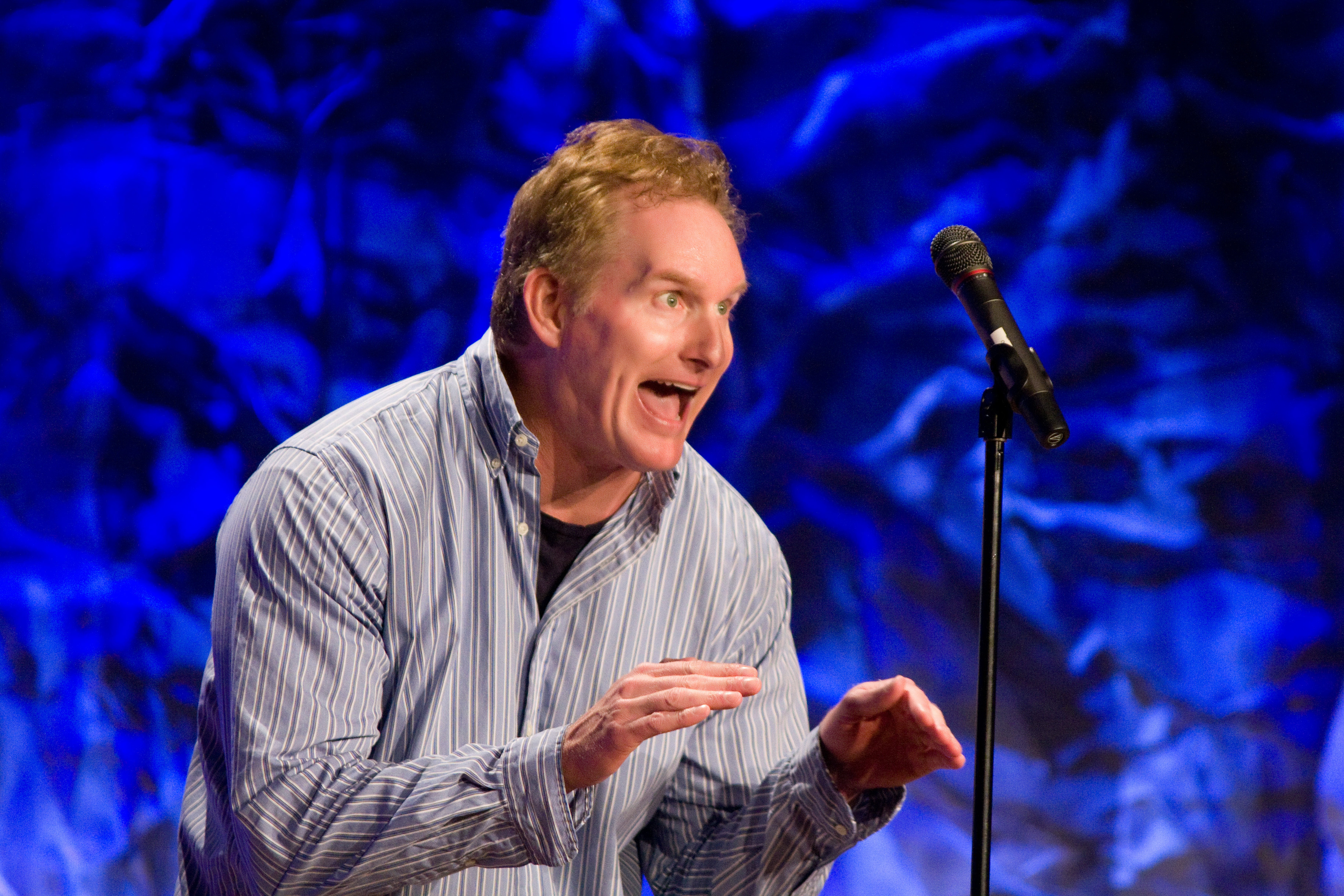
- Education: Rollins College
- Occupation: Stand-up comedian
- Website: www.greghahn.com

Greg Hahn is an American stand-up comedian. He is a frequent guest on the nationally syndicated The Bob & Tom Show, and has several television appearances including Late Night with Conan O'Brien. He also performs at numerous corporate functions and comedy clubs. He is known for his highly energetic style of humor, often speaking in loud, rapid bursts.

== Biography ==
Hahn was raised in South Florida and attended Cardinal Gibbons Catholic high school.

After graduating from Rollins College and serving as a Captain in the Marine Corps he became a buyer for Sanders Associates. In the beginning days of his comedy career he also had stints as a lumberjack and a Wild West stuntman. Once established in stand-up comedy, Hahn had appearances on Late Night With Conan O'Brien, Comedy Central's Premium Blend, Make Me Laugh, Louis C.K.'s Pulp Comics, Cedric the Entertainer Presents, 30 Seconds to Fame, Star Search, Comedy.TV and Comics Unleashed with Byron Allen.

Hahn is best known for his performances on the nationally syndicated Bob and Tom Radio Show, where his aggressive comedic style with numerous punchlines along with his drumming ability have earned him consistent appearances. He performed in the first Bob and Tom Comedy Central special and headlines many of their theater shows across the country.

He is based in Los Angeles.
