= Comedy for Koby =

Comedy for Koby is a bi-annual tour of Israel featuring some of America's top stand-up comedians. The tour, which was first launched in 2008, benefits The Koby Mandell Foundation, an Israeli non-profit organization that works with victims of terror attacks. Comedy for Koby is a project of Stand Up for Israel, which provides emotional support services to thousands of bereaved Israels. It is exclusively produced by DJW Productions. Stand-up comic Avi Liberman founded Stand Up for Israel and is responsible for recruiting the fellow comedians on the tour.

== History ==
In 2002, during the heart of the Second Palestinian Intifada, Israeli-born but Texas-raised stand-up comedian Avi Liberman decided to produce a small comedy tour in Israel as a way to raise the morale of Israeli audiences and give them a chance to get out and laugh.

This initial tour served as the framework to later create Stand Up for Israel, an effort designed to bring top-tier North American comics to Israel. Throughout the intifada, and even in more recent years, many top entertainers refrained from performing in Israel due to security concerns or because of personal political considerations. Liberman also designed his comedy tours to serve as fundraisers for Israeli-based charities and benefits from tickets sales went to charity. The initial charity which partnered with Liberman was the Crossroads Center in Jerusalem that works with troubled youth. Crossroads Comedy served as the name for Liberman's tours until 2008 when Liberman partnered with The Koby Mandell Foundation, leading to the creation of Comedy for Koby.

Koby Mandell was a 14-year-old resident of the settlement of Tekoa near Jerusalem who was murdered by a Palestinian terrorist alongside his friend Yosef Ishran while exploring a cave near his home in May 2001. The Koby Mandell Foundation was founded by Koby's parents Seth and Sherri Mandell to help other families afflicted by the loss of a loved one to terror. Seth Mandell welcomed the chance to create an event that would give people the chance to laugh and described it as a fitting memorial for their son as he loved comedy and the ability to laugh. Seth Mandell coined the name Comedy for Koby.

The first Stand up for Israel Tour under the Comedy for Koby name arrived in Israel in December 2008 with Avi Liberman, Chris Spencer, Modi and Mike Loftus. The Tour performed in five cities: Raanana, Beit Shemesh, Tel Aviv, Jerusalem, and Modiin. The Tour in June 2009 had Jeffrey Ross, David Crowe, AJ Jamal and Avi Liberman (who appears in all tours as a comic and master of ceremonies). The December 2009 Tour brought Marc Schiff, Steve White and Butch Bradley alongside Avi Liberman and had the addition of a sixth show in Haifa. The December 2016 tour had Avi Liberman with Tom Cotter, Elayne Boosler and Allan Havey. 2022 performers include Elon Gold, Dan Naturman, Ian Lara, and Jim Colliton. In addition to the comic's well-established routines, the tour welcomes them to use their time on stage to comment on their experiences in Israel.

In addition to performing at the various venues, the comics visit many of Israel's prominent landmarks, of interest to both Jewish and non-Jewish comedians. The lineup is designed to convey ethnic diversity in the world of comedy with Jewish, Irish, Italian, African American and Hispanic comics having already joined the Tour. Many of the comics report returning from their experiences with perspectives on Israel and the Middle East different from what is often reported in the mass media, as was described by David Horovitz, editor in chief of The Jerusalem Post in a column profiling Butch Bradley's experiences in Israel.
