= Bob Kevoian =

American radio personality (1950–2026)

- Born: Robert James Kevoian; December 2, 1950; Los Angeles, California, U.S.
- Died: April 17, 2026 (aged 75); Indianapolis, Indiana, U.S.
- Presenting career
- Show: The Bob & Tom Show
- Station: WFBQ Indianapolis, Indiana
- Stations: Nationally Syndicated (150 stations)
- Style: Comedy, satire
- Country: United States
- Website: bobkevoian.com

Robert James Kevoian (December 2, 1950 – April 17, 2026) was an American radio host of the nationally syndicated radio show The Bob & Tom Show together with his partner, Tom Griswold. The show was broadcast from WFBQ's studios in Indianapolis, Indiana.

== Education ==
Kevoian was a 1973 graduate of California State University, Long Beach. With no formal training in radio, Kevoian had never set foot in a radio studio until his time at WMBN in Petoskey, Michigan, where he met future business partner Tom Griswold.

== Entertainment career ==
After touring the U.S. for three years as sound engineer of The Young Americans, Kevoian began his radio career at WMBN in Petoskey, Michigan, in 1979. In 1981, at cross-town WJML, Kevoian began his on-air partnership with Griswold.

In 1983, the Bob & Tom Show went on the air on WFBQ "Q95" in Indianapolis. The show began national syndication in 1995. It has won five Marconi Awards and released more than 60 comedy albums. It has been noted for having up-and-coming comedians as guests, including Tim Allen, George Lopez, Rodney Carrington, and Brad Garrett.

=== On television ===
On November 3, 2008, WGN America began airing an hour-long Bob and Tom TV show overnight Monday through Friday featuring clips from the day's four-hour radio broadcast, until its cancellation in September 2010.

=== Retirement ===
On November 5, 2015, after being inducted along with Griswold into the National Radio Hall of Fame, Kevoian announced his retirement effective at the end of 2015. His last live show as co-host aired on December 17, 2015. On November 17, 2016, Bob and Tom were reunited when they were inducted into the Indiana Broadcasters Hall of Fame. Kevoian made his first post-retirement appearance as a guest host on April 3, 2017, when the show was in Cincinnati for the Cincinnati Reds home opener. Kevoian returned again on December 8, 2017, filling in for Tom Griswold. Kevoian returned March 30, 2018, and March 28, 2019, for the Cincinnati Reds opening day broadcast and again on May 24, 2019, for the Indianapolis 500 Bob & Tom Show. Kevoian returned once again on April 17, 2020, to the show.

== Personal life ==
Kevoian was born in Los Angeles, California, to John Hike "Toby" Kevoian and Jean Baker. In 1985, he married Helen Lemieur, with whom he has one son. In 2005, he married Becky Martin. Kevoian was almost always seen wearing a Los Angeles Dodgers hat as a tribute to his father, who was a longtime employee of the Dodgers, but considered himself "a big Cincinnati Reds fan." Kevoian was an avid guitar player and wrote some of the lyrics and music for the show's comedic parodies. Kevoian's brother-in-law (Becky's brother) is world-renowned tuba player Rex Martin. Kevoian's younger brother is actor Peter Kevoian.

After his retirement in 2015, Kevoian spent much time with his wife touring the United States in their Airstream camper, eventually camping overnight in each of the 48 contiguous states.

On June 7, 2023, Kevoian made a guest appearance on The Bob & Tom Show to reveal he had been diagnosed with gastric cancer. Kevoian said the outlook was very good and he had responded to treatment well. While on the show Kevoian promoted his podcast The Bob & Cancer Show. The show included Bob, his wife Becky, and longtime Bob & Tom Show friend Whit Grayson. The show chronicled his journey with cancer and highlighted the humorous aspects of it. During his treatment, it was stated that he experienced no hair loss, his iconic mustache was still intact, and he was ready to celebrate its 54th birthday on June 18.

Kevoian died on April 17, 2026, at the age of 75, after battling stomach cancer for three years. He had been in relatively good health despite his cancer diagnosis up until the morning of his death, before suddenly declining in the afternoon.

In a poignant yet funny conversation that aired live on WFBQ "Q95" late that same evening, Griswold announced Kevoian's death and reminisced about his life and their long career together. The conversation concluded with a musical tribute in the form of "Golden Slumbers" by The Beatles. In an emotional interview with WTHR, Griswold described how Kevoian's family were singing "Golden Slumbers" together when he died.
