= WFBQ =

Radio station in Indianapolis, Indiana

- Indianapolis, Indiana; United States
- Broadcast area: Indianapolis metropolitan area
- Frequency: 94.7 MHz (HD Radio)
- Branding: Q95

Programming
- Format: Classic rock
- Subchannels: HD2: Sports (WNDE)
- Affiliations: Westwood One

Ownership
- Owner: iHeartMedia; (iHM Licenses, LLC)
- Sister stations: WNDE; WOLT; WZRL; W248AW

History
- First air date: November 19, 1959
- Former call signs: WFBM-FM (1959–1973)
- Call sign meaning: Adapted from former WFBM call sign

Technical information
- Licensing authority: FCC
- Facility ID: 59590
- Class: B
- ERP: 58,000 watts
- HAAT: 245 meters (804 ft)
- Transmitter coordinates: 39°53′41.2″N 86°12′2.3″W

Links
- Public license information: Public file; LMS
- Webcast: Listen live (via iHeartRadio)
- Website: q95.iheart.com

WFBQ (94.7 FM, "Q95") is a radio station in Indianapolis, Indiana, United States, owned by iHeartMedia. The studios are located at 6161 Fall Creek Road on the northeast side of Indianapolis. The transmitter and antenna are located on the northwest side of Indianapolis. It is the flagship station of the popular nationally syndicated program The Bob & Tom Show.

== History ==
WFBQ began operation as WFBM-FM on November 19, 1959, as the sister station to WFBM (1260 AM) and WFBM-TV (channel 6).

In 1961, the two WFBM radio stations were sold to Fischer Communications, who also owned WAZY and WAZY-FM in Lafayette and WGBF and WGBF-FM in Evansville. In 1972, WFBM-TV became WRTV. In August 1973, WFBM became the Top 40 WNDE. WFBM-FM had become oldies-formatted WFBQ earlier that same year. One year later, WFBQ was rebranded as "Rockin' Stereo!" (the FM Top 40 counterpart to WNDE) using an automation package called "Stereo Rock" produced by TM Productions of Dallas. On Valentine's Day, 1978, "Rockin' Stereo!" was dropped in favor of an AOR format and live DJs.

One popular afternoon jock who had significant ties to the Indianapolis area was Jimmy "Mad Dog" Matis.

== Station broadcasting information ==
The station broadcasts with 58 kilowatts of both vertical and horizontal power. More information can be found at the WFBQ FM query page at the FCC website. 58 kW makes WFBQ the most powerful FM station in Indiana.

WFBQ is licensed to broadcast in the HD Radio format.

== Programming ==
WFBQ changed to an album rock format on February 14, 1978, at 7 AM. After several years of a classic rock lean, WFBQ changed to classic rock by 2005, when competitor WKLU defected to classic hits.

It also has two sister stations, WNDE (originally WFBM) and WOLT (originally WXTZ-FM, later WRZX).

WFBQ has been the home of The Bob & Tom Show since 1983, remaining the flagship station even after distribution switched from iHeartMedia to rival Cumulus Media in 2014.

It was the flagship station for Indianapolis Colts game broadcasts from 1998 through the 2007 Super Bowl. The rights have since been acquired by Emmis Communications' WLHK.

WFBQ is the State Primary Source for the Indiana Emergency Alert System.

== Legacy ==
At a 1991 Guns N' Roses concert in Noblesville, Indiana, frontman Axl Rose (a Lafayette native) spotted a fan wearing a Q95 T-shirt and proceeded to tell the crowd about how he listened to Q95 while growing up. Rose said to the fans, "You know what?! That station saved my freakin' life."
