= Chick McGee =

American radio presenter

- Born: Charles Dean Fout; November 26, 1957 (age 68); London, Ohio
- Children: 3
- Presenting career
- Show: The Bob & Tom Show
- Website: www.chickmcgee.com

Charles Dean Hayes (né Fout), better known by his stage name Chick McGee, is a radio personality who appears on The Bob & Tom Show. The name "Chick McGee" is a pseudonym connected with the Jack McGee character on The Incredible Hulk.

== Personal life ==
McGee was born November 26, 1957, in London, Ohio. He has three children and has been married and divorced three times.

== Education ==
McGee graduated from London High School in 1976. McGee graduated from an independent broadcast school in June 1976. In 2014 he was inducted in the inaugural class of the Fine Arts Hall of Fame of the London City Schools.

== Professional career ==
He began his career at a small 1,000-watt radio station in Welch West Virginia, and held various on-air positions at stations in West Virginia and Ohio. Prior to joining The Bob and Tom Show, he went by the name Chuck Mikelz. On April 1, 1985, Chick joined The Bob & Tom Show. In January 1995, Chick left The Bob and Tom Show to become co-host of a show called Kevin & McGee at KGB-FM in San Diego, California. After six months in San Diego, McGee returned on July 10, 1995 to his former job on The Bob & Tom Show.

=== The Bob and Tom Show ===
McGee joined The Bob & Tom Show on April 1, 1986, as the show's announcer. His duties expanded to include recapping the day's sports news and being the show's comic foil.

=== Off the Air Podcast / The Chick McGee Show ===
McGee started podcasting on July 24, 2012. It is regularly hosted by Chick and his former fiancé Jess Hooker. The podcast is an insightful look into his off-air personality. Chick talks about Fat Kid Weekends, Anger Sweats, who he would never allow on his podcast, and off-air radio stories.

After 188 episodes as the Off the Air Podcast, McGee's podcast was renamed The Chick McGee Show on July 3, 2016.

=== TruLuv Sports ===
In 2014, Chick McGee was hired as a writer for the online sports website TruLuvSports.com. He has written about the Washington Commanders and Ray Rice.
