= The Bob & Tom Show =

American radio show

- Genre: Comedy
- Running time: 24/7
- Country of origin: United States
- Home station: WFBQ "Q95"
- Syndicates: Westwood One
- Hosted by: Tom Griswold; Chick McGee; Kristi Lee; Josh Arnold; Bob Kevoian
- Produced by: Jason Hoffsetz; Dean Metcalf
- Original release: March 7, 1983
- Website: bobandtom.com

The Bob & Tom Show is a syndicated US radio program established by Bob Kevoian and Tom Griswold at radio station WFBQ in Indianapolis, Indiana, March 7, 1983, and syndicated nationally since January 6, 1995. Originally syndicated by Premiere Networks, the show moved to Cumulus Media Networks (now Westwood One) at the beginning of 2014.

The program enjoys extensive popularity and has frequently received recognition by the National Association of Broadcasters as an exemplar in American radio. Cumulus Media describes the program as "the most successful nationally syndicated morning drive show in radio history."

== About ==
"Focusing on comedy and talk," The Bob & Tom Show describes itself as "a mash-up of news, sports, conversation, and interviews" and "America's leading media outlet for the best comedians, whether they are already household names or still paying their dues on the road." Cumulus Media notes that the program delivers "an unpredictable blend of news, talk, sports, celebrity guests, in-studio musical performances, sketch comedy and topical, sometimes irreverent, humor."

New broadcasts air weekday mornings live from 6:00 to 10:00 A.M. in the Eastern Time Zone (5:00 – 9:00 A.M. Central) or tape-delayed on affiliated stations in other time zones. An additional weekday segment aired between 10:00 and approximately 10:15 A.M. ET only on home station WFBQ — but as of February 13, 2017, the post-show segment airs only on select dates rather than daily.

=== Guests and content ===
During the show, live or pre-recorded comedy bits and songs are occasionally played, including many from a huge library of archived pieces from the show's long history. Older clips often included impromptu "calls" from numerous characters voiced primarily by Steve Salge, Ron Sexton, Dean Metcalf, and, in the show's earlier years, Mark Patrick.

Guests join the primary cast throughout each week either in the studio or via video call or telephone, including numerous comedians who tour nationally. The show has frequently featured up-and-coming comedians who went on to become household names, including Ellen DeGeneres, Drew Carey, Louis CK, Jim Gaffigan, Daniel Tosh, George Lopez, Brad Garrett, Ron White, and Tim Allen.

Professional athletes (including Joe Theismann, and, in past years, Pat McAfee, Peyton Manning, Jeff Saturday, Reggie Miller, and numerous INDYCAR drivers), musicians (Edwin McCain, John Mellencamp, and others), and actors from television and movies are also frequent Bob & Tom guests. The show has occasionally talked with national politicians, although those interviews generally steer clear of controversial issues. Nationally known authors including frequent guest John Feinstein have also been featured.

=== Broadcast formats ===
Most affiliate stations air the show's regular format, a full 60 minutes of content per hour during the live four-hour broadcast each weekday morning. Each hour includes three six-minute breaks with a mix of local and/or national commercials and content.

In April 2025, the show began offering Bob & Tom Plus, a tailored version of the live broadcast "for affiliate stations aiming to integrate local content, promotions, and music alongside the latest Bob and Tom Show segments."

During the second, third, and fourth hours of Plus version of the broadcast, the show features three 11-minute segments of new B&T content (tape-delayed and condensed from the previous hour of the regular format's live broadcast), interspersed with three 9-minute music and commercial segments from the local affiliate. During the first hour, Bob and Tom Plus features "the best evergreen moments from the previous show's 9 AM hour and, if needed, classic show bits to fill in any time gaps."

=== App and streaming ===
The show introduced the free Bob & Tom Show App for iOS and Android in early 2016, through which users may hear live streams of new broadcasts on weekday mornings through affiliate stations. When the show isn't broadcasting live, the app airs "Bob & Tom Radio" (sometimes called "Bob & Tom 24/7"), a continuous stream of "Best of Bob & Tom" segments and replays of the show. Those back-to-back Bob & Tom Show replays start at or after 1:00 p.m. (Eastern Time) each weekday, featuring an unedited recording of the live broadcast from earlier that day.

The app's introduction in 2016 marked the first time that a stream of broadcasts from the show's archive became available 24 hours a day, 7 days a week at no charge to listeners. Previously, "B&T 24/7" was available only to paid subscribers of the "VIP" feature at the show's web site. "B&T 24/7" features segments recorded throughout the show's history. Some segments feature the original primary cast of Bob, Tom, Chick, and Kristi, while other segments were recorded after Josh Arnold joined the cast.

The "B&T 24/7" stream is also available via the show's website. When broadcasting live, the show can be seen as a livestream on YouTube.

== History ==
The Bob & Tom Show celebrated its 40th anniversary on the air at flagship WFBQ "Q95" on March 7, 2023.

For most of The Bob & Tom Show's history, the cast consisted of hosts Bob Kevoian and Tom Griswold, sports commentator and comic foil Chick McGee, news director Kristi Lee, and producer Dean Metcalf. Kevoian and Griswold originally teamed up in the early 1980s at Petoskey, Michigan station WJML before being lured to WFBQ "Q95" Indianapolis in 1983 to host what was initially a music-heavy morning show. Marty Bender then arrived as both Program Director and contributor. After McGee (in 1986) and Lee (in 1988) joined the show, the primary cast that listeners would know for decades simply as "Bob, Tom, Chick, and Kristi" was set.

As the show became more popular and successful, Mark Patrick, Dave Dugan, Whit Grayson, Steve Salge, and Ron Sexton joined the Bob & Tom staff to voice dozens of recurring fictional and parody characters. Although Salge and Metcalf were active as voices of most of the show's fictional characters and callers through early 2024, their bits still air frequently on the 24/7 stream.

=== Extra voices and recurring substitutes ===
In the early years of the show, Pat Carlini served as a fifth in-studio cast member, joining Bob, Tom, Chick, and Kristi during their second or third hour after Carlini completed her weather-casting and news anchor duties at WTHR television's morning news program.

Since the show was first syndicated in January 1995, Dave "Gunner" Gunn sometimes filled in for Bob, Tom, Chick, or Kristi when one of them was absent. Additionally, for several days in May 2016, Gunner filled in while Chick was on vacation, which was Gunner's first appearance during all-new broadcasts in years. Subsequently, Gunner occasionally joined the cast, both to "run the board" (operate the broadcast studio's main audio mixing console, which Tom calls "master control") and to serve as an additional co-host. Gunner served as the show's host during "Best of Bob & Tom" broadcasts when the primary cast was on vacation until the January 2017 debut of his sports-oriented morning show on sister station WNDE. Hosting duties for "Best of" broadcasts were then handled by Christopher Geisen, formerly of WOFX-FM in Cincinnati and the Kerrigan & Christopher morning show at WTUE in Dayton, Ohio, and a member of the B&T staff.

For a period preceding Bob's late-2015 retirement, Scott Potasnik ("P-taz") replaced Gunner as the fourth in-studio voice when Bob went on extended vacations or took Mondays off, and Potasnik remained an unofficial cast member for some time after Bob's retirement. Tom described "P-taz" as the show's "sex desk" correspondent and, after Bob's retirement, as its "fact checker." Potasnik's role with the show ended in early summer 2016.

During 2015 and 2016, the show frequently featured "guest hosts," usually comedians, as a fourth or fifth in-studio voice, sometimes for several days or weeks at a time. Josh Arnold served as a frequent guest host during spring and early summer of 2016 before being named a regular cast member on August 1, 2016.

The "master control" seat, historically occupied by Bob, had been filled after his retirement mostly by Bob & Tom staffers who did not speak on the air until Ace Cosby joined the show in 2017 as its in-studio engineer and occasional on-air contributor. Cosby joined Bob & Tom flagship WFBQ in 1981 as an on-air personality and helped Kristi get her first job at the station. Tom refers to him as "the legendary Ace Cosby" as an homage to Cosby's 40 years of popularity with Indianapolis-area listeners and personal relationships with numerous rock musicians.

Comedian, musician, and songwriter Pat Godwin joined the show as an in-studio voice in 2017, largely to provide live parody songs about topics that come up in the day's news and conversation.

=== Hall of Fame, Bob's retirement, and lifetime achievements ===
On September 1, 2015, Bob and Tom were selected as inductees to the National Radio Hall of Fame. The induction ceremony took place on November 5, 2015, at the Museum of Broadcast Communications in downtown Chicago. During his induction speech, Bob announced his retirement effective at the end of 2015. Bob's last day on the air was December 17, 2015. He planned to spend retirement traveling with his wife, Becky.

On November 17, 2016, Bob and Tom were reunited during their induction into the Indiana Broadcasters Hall of Fame. On April 3, 2017, Bob made his first live on-air appearance since his retirement for the show's annual Cincinnati Reds Opening Day broadcast. On May 26, 2017, Bob made a second appearance at the Indy 500 Carb Day show.

On June 27, 2022, Kristi was named as a member of the Indiana Broadcast Pioneers Hall of Fame Class of 2022, and the induction ceremony took place on October 4, 2022.

The Indiana Broadcasters Association named Tom a recipient of their Lifetime Achievement Award on October 3, 2022, during the association's annual meeting.

=== Departures, returns, additional retirements, and deaths ===
On January 5, 1995, Chick left The Bob & Tom Show to become co-host of a show called Kevin & McGee at KGB-FM in San Diego, California. After six months in San Diego, McGee returned on July 10, 1995, to his former job on The Bob & Tom Show. Dave Wilson filled in for Chick at first and then Gunner filled in for the rest of Chick's absence.

Kristi Lee announced on January 11, 2016, that she, too, had left the show, having last appeared on December 17, 2015. She returned to the show on July 11, 2016, resuming her traditional news and commentary role. The show later described her as both a "co-host and news director."

During Kristi's absence, Carlini had re-joined The Bob & Tom Show as news anchor (for all four hours each morning). After Kristi returned, Carlini appeared on a half-time basis for several more days.

Comedian Tim Wilson, a frequent guest who contributed many songs and bits to the show's albums, died on February 26, 2014.

On July 21, 2023, Ron Sexton died at the age of 52.

Dean Metcalf, who served as producer for 36 years, retired from the show in early 2024. Jason Hoffsetz is his successor.

Christopher Geisen, a member of the show's staff and host of its "Best of" broadcasts for many years, retired from the show in September 2026.

=== Bob's death ===
On April 17, 2026, ten years and four months into his retirement, Bob Kevoian died at the age of 75 after a three-year battle with stomach cancer.

In a poignant yet funny conversation with Gunner that aired live on WFBQ "Q95" late that same evening, Tom announced Bob's death and reminisced about his life and their long career together. Their conversation concluded with a musical tribute to Bob in the form of "Golden Slumbers" by The Beatles. In an emotional interview with WTHR, Tom described how Bob's family were singing "Golden Slumbers" together when Bob died.

=== Syndication extensions ===
National radio syndicator Westwood One granted a multi-year contract extension on May 1, 2018, to The Bob & Tom Show. iHeartMedia, corporate parent of flagship WFBQ "Q95" and another 12 of the show's 100+ syndication outlets, announced a renewed agreement on December 10, 2018, to continue airing the show on those iHeartMedia stations.

Westwood One signed a multi-year agreement in October 2021 to continue airing the show on numerous Cumulus Media stations. The renewal was described as a "long-term deal."

=== TV program and worldwide radio broadcasts ===
On November 3, 2008, WGN America began airing an hour-long Bob and Tom TV show at 12:13 am (later, 2:13 a.m.) Monday through Friday featuring clips from the day's four-hour radio broadcast. As part of the deal, WTTV Indianapolis (another Tribune-owned station) was the first to air the nightly telecast. The program ended its run on WGN America on September 10, 2010, as part of an extensive revamp of the network's schedule.

WISH-TV announced that a new, 30-minute Bob and Tom television show would air weeknights and late Saturday nights beginning October 5, 2020, on MyIndy-TV 23 (WNDY-TV, Indianapolis), featuring clips from that morning's radio broadcast. The television program last aired on January 8, 2022.

A short version (typically between three and 20 minutes long) of Bob and Tom Tonight continues to be posted at 8 p.m. (Eastern Time) weekdays on YouTube and Facebook.

Starting in January 2011, The Bob & Tom Show aired around the world on the American Forces Network as the morning show on AFN's Legacy Channel. The government discontinued the AFN Legacy Channel in 2025.

== Health issues and recovery ==
On August 21, 2019, Tom underwent a surgical procedure on his right eye for which recovery required continuous bed rest. This led to a few days of new broadcasts during which neither original hosts Bob or Tom were present in the studio, rare in the show's long history.

The show announced on August 16, 2021, that Tom was in the hospital recovering from heart valve replacement surgery and was "doing very well." He had been "out on assignment" from the show for several days when Chick, serving as interim host, announced the reason for Tom's absence. Doctors had planned to perform a valve repair operation for Tom but determined that a valve replacement "would provide a better long term outcome." Tom was expected to return to the air initially from a home studio, but he went instead to the main Bob and Tom studio at WFBQ for the third and fourth hours of the September 13, 2021, show for his first post-surgery appearance.

During an in-studio appearance on June 7, 2023, Bob announced that he was recovering from stomach and esophagus cancer, first diagnosed two months earlier. He underwent radiation treatment, chemotherapy, and surgery. Bob documented his cancer journey on a podcast called "The Bob and Cancer Show." Bob died on April 17, 2026, at 75.

Over the years, Chick has suffered from angina. The show made light of the situation with the comedic song "Ch-Ch-Ch Chick" in 2013, during which Tom is portrayed as showing disinterest as Chick experiences an angina attack. Chick's gall bladder was removed in June 2022.

== Live on stage ==
The show's primary cast performed live on stage with guest comedians and live musicians at evening shows in venues around the country for several years in the late 1990s and early 2000s. Later, they supported the Friends of the Bob & Tom Show Comedy Tour, which featured many of their frequent guests and spawned Comedy Central broadcasts and a DVD recording.

== Characters ==
Many fictional characters and parodies of real-life people have sprung up during the show's history, some voiced by Bob Kevoian, Tom Griswold, Chick McGee, on-air producer Dean Metcalf, Steve Salge, and the late Ron Sexton.

Recurring characters

- Floyd the Truck Driver (Ron Sexton)
- Jumbo the Elephant (Dean Metcalf)
- Ernie Furglar (owner of Furglar's Hardware Store) (Steve Salge)
- Herm Johnson (St. Petersburg snowbird) (Steve Salge)
- Hadji (Marc Much)
- Ian St. Ian (Dean Metcalf)
- Doc Whiskey (Tom Griswold)
- Dick Mango (Tom Griswold)
- Rick (Ron Sexton)
- Sid Gurney (Whit Grayson)
- Bart McAllister (Dave Dugan)
- Captain Dave – Captain of the Chum Dumpster (Steve Salge)
- Coach Ralph Fontaine (Ron Sexton)
- Kenny Tarmac (Ron Sexton) – embodied that annoying traveling salesman on a flight with an overinflated sense of self-worth who felt the need to demonstrate to everyone how important he was by loudly calling someone just as the plane lands. He always used airport abbreviations while referring to his locations to further illustrate just how busy and important he was. He always called Bob and Tom when he landed, and he always got another call while talking to them. On a few occasions, while talking to Bob and Tom, he ran into a big-time client, whom Kenny cannot remember by name. During this time, he put Bob and Tom on hold, while he tried to use his "Zig Ziglar bag of tricks" to get the client to reveal his name, usually failing.
- Donnie Baker (played by Ron Sexton) – regularly made topical calls to the show and had a very authentic redneck accent. He related anecdotes involving a good friend who had a semi-relevant experience, usually ending in a punch-line. Most of his calls were punctuated by a tagline like, "I swear to God" or "Look it up..." or "it's state law." Donnie loved baseball, and was a lifelong fan of the Cincinnati Reds. He perpetually had a boat for sale, which was impounded at one point and became the center of an ongoing feud with his unseen "neighbor to the north" and lifelong arch-nemesis, Tony Mitchell. According to Donnie, Tony Mitchell had been his "lifelong swear-to-God enemy since Eric Davis (Donnie's and Sexton's favorite baseball player and childhood idol in character and in real life) ruled the outfield at Riverfront Stadium," and "have been at it ever since," intimating that he and Mitchell might have grown up together, or knew one another for over 30 years. Donnie and "Two Ton Tony" frequently exchanged insults and made threats against one another over their shared property line, including Donnie repeatedly insulting Mitchell's wife for being overweight and unhygienic. Donnie also wrote letters to Kid Rock, explaining how much he wanted to "punch Mitchell's mouth loose," and "punch through Mitchell's chest bones." Despite the ongoing threats and the claim that he had "a black belt from Discount Karate," Donnie stated that he couldn't risk getting into a physical altercation with Mitchell because he was on probation and wore an ankle monitor. Sometimes, Donnie was corrected, or told to get off the phone by Randy, his work supervisor (voiced by Matt Thompson), after which he always yelled, "Shut up Randy!" Donnie's popularity soared in 2015, and became an internet sensation when a video of him angrily recanting a story of Tony Mitchell having his boat impounded by the home owners association went viral, with Donnie calling Mitchell's wife a "sea cow," and ending with Donnie yelling over the fence, "This is war, Mitchell!" The video has over 100 million views across multiple platforms, and audio segments have been lip synched and used over 10 million times as a sound bed on TikTok, propelling Donnie into the biggest breakout character of the show. In a subsequent video, he would get his boat back and continue to exchange threats and insults with Mitchell across their shared property line. On many calls into the station, Donnie would tell a story about something that recently happened between "me and my no-good, nosey neighbor to the north, Tony Mitchell. He's at it again, Bob and Tom," invariably producing multiple punchlines at Mitchell's expense. Donnie also appeared with his band as "Donnie Baker and the Pork Pistols," and had on-and-off relationships with women named Patty Ferguson and Angel Skinner, both of whom he puts an "s" on the end of their last names (calling them "Patty Fergusons" and "Angel Skinners," respectively). His calls usually came to an abrupt end, and always by him saying, "...I gotta go."
- Mr. Obvious and the Caller (Chick McGee & Dean Metcalf) – A frequent skit subject on The Bob & Tom Show, Mr. Obvious is portrayed as a radio personality with his own show, The Mr. Obvious Show. He gives obvious and simple advice about whatever problem the caller may have. The caller always seems to be the same person, and opens the conversation with "Hi, Mr. Obvious. Long time listener, first time caller." From there, the caller will describe his issue and give symptoms to help Mr. Obvious figure out his problem. Most of the time, the caller's issue is something that anyone else could figure out, but he cannot. Mr. Obvious is played by Chick McGee, and the caller is played by Dean Metcalf.

Recurring parodies of real people and fictional characters

- Sir Charles (Charles Barkley) (Ron Sexton)
- Jack Bauer (from the TV series "24") (Steve Salge)
- Joe Biden, George W. Bush, Bill Clinton, Al Gore, Ted Kennedy are all voiced by the same comedian. (Steve Salge)
- Morgan Freeman (as his character Red from the movie The Shawshank Redemption) (Ron Sexton)
- James Gandolfini (as Tony Soprano) (Ron Sexton)
- Sammy Davis Jr. (Ricky Rydell)
- Jerry Jones (Ron Sexton)
- Larry King (Steve Salge)
- Dr. Phil McGraw (Ron Sexton)
- The Pope (always in a stereotypical Italian accent) (Dean Metcalf)
- Steven Seagal and his fan (Ron Sexton)
- Dean Martin and Jerry Lewis (Ricky Rydell)
- Babe Ruth (Ron Sexton)
- Richard Nixon (Jay Baker)

The show also takes calls from actual live listeners, plus miscellaneous "crazy listener" caricatures.

== Show members ==
Current

- Tom Griswold – co-host (1983–present)
- Chick McGee – co-host, sports (1986–present)
- Kristi Lee – co-host, news (1988–present)
- Josh Arnold – co-host, comedian (2016–present)
- Jessica Alsman – Affiliate Marketing | On-Air Contributor
- Jess Hooker – Special Projects Coordinator l On-Air Chef
- Jason Hoffsetz – Producer
- Alli Breen – East Coast Correspondent
- Al Jackson – West Coast Correspondent
- Jeff Oskay – Comedian
- Willie Griswold – Comedian
- Reno Collier – Comedian
- Ace Cosby – engineer (2017–present)
- Pat Godwin – musician (2017–present)

Former

- Bob Kevoian – Co-host, engineer (1983–2015)
- Dave Gunn – Sports
- Pat Carlini – News
- Scott Potasnik – Comedian
- Dean Metcalf – Producer (1987–2023)
- Ron Sexton – Comedian (2005–2023)

Timeline

== Public service ==
Over their career, the show has been actively involved in charitable work. Some of the albums they have produced since 1986 have been utilized to raise money for various charities.

It was an October tradition for Chick to get a prostate exam on the air to raise awareness for prostate cancer. Bob and Tom used to promote this exam as "Proctober"; however, this exam is now "Rectember". The latest exam was held on September 6, 2011, with Gunner doing it.

The Bob & Tom Show has produced seven CDs for the USO to include in holiday care packages sent to troops stationed worldwide.

Bob and Tom had a friendly wager with former Indianapolis Colts center Jeff Saturday that if he ever got a touchdown they would donate $5,000 to the charity of his choice. During the 2006–07 NFL season, they increased the wager to $10,000. They assumed that they were safe since offensive linemen almost never score points in NFL games. In January 2007 in the AFC Championship game against the rival New England Patriots, on a play near New England's goal line, Dominic Rhodes carried into the middle of the line and fumbled. Saturday fell on the ball in the end zone for the touchdown. Bob and Tom made good on their wager and donated $10,000 total with $5,000 each going to People's Burn Foundation of Indiana and Kid's Voice of Indiana, Inc.

On May 9, 2014, Bob and Tom presented a comedy show as a tribute to the late Tim Wilson. All proceeds went to help with the education of Tim's son.

== Awards ==
- In 1993, 1995, 1997, 1999, and 2006, Bob and Tom were recipients of the Marconi Award from the NAB.
- From 1991 to 1998, Bob and Tom received The Billboard Magazine Radio Personality of the Year award.
- In 1994 and 2008, Bob and Tom were named Sagamores of the Wabash, the state of Indiana's highest honor.
- In 1996 and 2000, the show was awarded the National Chairman's Citation Award from the Leukemia Society of America.
- In 2000, 2001, and 2003, Bob and Tom received the Radio & Records Classic Rock Personality of the Year Award.

== Discography ==
Steve Allee is the show's music director. He co-produced more than 50 Bob & Tom albums over 25 years.

- 100 (2016)
- The Free Laughs Collection (December 2013) (digital download)
- Don't Answer That! (December 2012)
- Radio Chatter (November 2012 – eighth USO Care Package troop-only album)
- Somewhere Over the Radio (November 2011)
- Hot Air (November 2011 – seventh USO Care Package troop-only album)
- Crushed Nuts (December 2010)
- General Static (October 2010 – sixth USO Care Package troop-only album)
- Dead Air (November 2009)
- Radio Waves (October 2009 – fifth USO Care Package troop-only album)
- As Big As a Hat (November 2008)
- Greetings from the USA (October 2008 – fourth USO Care Package troop-only album)
- My Job Sucks (June 2008)
- State Law (November 2007 – part of WJL package)
- We Just Landed! (November 2007)
- Radio Rations (October 2007 – third USO Care Package troop-only album)
- Please, Stand Up (September 2007)
- Bob and Tom: Comedy All Stars Tour DVD (2006)
- Bob and Tom: Standup, Sitting Down DVD (2006)
- Bob and Tom: The Comedy Tour Volume 1 DVD (2006)
- Shut-Up Randy! (November 2006)
- Man Boobs (November 2006)
- Operation Radio (October 2006 – second USO Care Package troop-only album)
- Donkey Show (July 2006)
- The Donnie Baker Collection: Boat for Sale (November 2005)
- Happy Hour (November 2005)
- The Mr. Obvious Show (October 2005)
- A Radio Institution (July 2005 – first USO Care Package troop-only album)
- Sideshow (November 2004)
- Bob and Tom: Home Movie DVD (November 2004)
- Odd Balls (October 2004)
- Mistletoe (December 2003)
- Camel Toe (December 2003)
- Wild About Harry (October 2003)
- Uncensored (December 2002)
- Gone Wild (December 2002)
- Radiogram (December 2001)
- We're Still Standing Tall (September 2001)
- You Guys Rock! (December 2000)
- The Election Collection 2000 (November 2000)
- Take Off Your Clothes! (Fall 2000)
- Indiana Rocks (April 2000)
- Greatest Hits: Volume One (December 1999)
- Back in '98 (December 1998)
- Gimme an "F" (December 1997)
- Fun House (August 1997)
- It's a Wonderful Laugh (December 1996)
- Factory Air (June 1996)
- Planet Bob & Tom (December 1995)
- Checkered Past (May 1995)
- Canned Laughter (December 1994)
- Good Ol' Boys (August 1994)
- Air Bags (May 1994)
- Lollapaloozers (December 1993)
- Laugh in the Fast Lane (May 1993)
- We Three Kings (December 1992)
- Motorheads (Spring 1992)
- Air Heads (December 1991)
- Just Skiddin (May 1991)
- Twin Geeks (December 1990)
- Good Morning Saudi Arabia (cassette) (November 1990)
- Find My Keys and We'll Drive Out! (May 1990)
- With a Little Help From Our Friends (December 1989)
- It's A New Track Record! (May 1989)
- Last Train To Whiskeyville (December 1988)
- A Day at the Race (cassette) (May 1988)
- I Spent The War In Indiana / Oh Danny Quayle (cassette single) (1988)
- Shabbey Road (December 1987)
- The White Album (December 1986)
