= Ripley (name) =

- Pronunciation: /ˈripli/
- Gender: Unisex
- Language: English

Origin
- Language: Old English
- Origin: Combination of Hrypa and lēah
- Meaning: "woodland clearing"
- Region of origin: England

Other names
- Short form: Rip
- Related names: Ridley, Shipley

Ripley is both a surname and a unisex given name. Notable people bearing it include:

== Given name ==
- Ripley A. Arnold (1817–1853), United States Army major
- Ripley B. Weaver (1829–1900), American politician, raiser of stock animals and soldier
- Ripley Bee-Jones (born 2010), daughter of Jason Jones and Samantha Bee
- Ripley Hitchcock (1857–1918), American editor
- Ripley P. Bullen (1902–1976), American archaeologist and academic
- Ripley Parker (born 2000), English writer and daughter of Thandiwe Newton and Ol Parker
- Ripley Rader, American fashion designer
- Ripley Rand (born 1967), American jurist
- Ripley Sobo, American actress

== Surname ==
- Alexandra Ripley (1934–2004), American writer
- Alice Ripley (born 1963), American actress
- Allen Ripley (1952–2014), American baseball player
- Amanda Ripley, American journalist and author
- Andy Ripley (1947–2010), English rugby player
- Andy Ripley (footballer) (born 1975), English footballer
- Arthur Ripley (1897–1961), American screenwriter
- Brian Ripley (born 1952), British statistician
- Dorothy Ripley (1767–1832), British missionary
- Edward H. Ripley (1829–1915), American general and businessman
- Edward Payson Ripley (1845–1920), American railroad executive
- Eleazer Wheelock Ripley (1782–1839), American general and politician
- Eliza McHatton Ripley (1832–1912), American civil war era author
- Fay Ripley (born 1966), British actress
- George Ripley (alchemist) (c. 1415–1490), English alchemist
- George Ripley (transcendentalist) (1802–1880), American social reformer
- Gladys Ripley (1908–1955), British singer
- Heather Ripley (born 1959), actress
- Henry A. Ripley (1842–1926), American politician
- Henry J. Ripley (1798–1875), biblical scholar
- James Wolfe Ripley (1794–1870), American general
- John Ripley (1867–1933), British soldier
- John Ripley (USMC) (1939–2008), American Marine
- Lynn Ripley (1948–2015), birth name of English singer-songwriter Twinkle
- Martha Ripley (1843–1912), American physician
- Robert Ripley (1890–1949), American entrepreneur, amateur anthropologist
- Roswell Ripley (1823–1887), American general
- Sarah Bradford Ripley (1793–1867), American scholar
- Sidney Dillon Ripley (1913–2001), American ornithologist
- Sir Henry William Ripley (1813–1882), British politician and philanthropist
- Steve Ripley (1950–2019), American singer-songwriter, frontman of the country rock band The Tractors
- Stuart Ripley (born 1967), English football player
- Thomas Ripley (architect) (1686–1758), English architect
- William Z. Ripley (1867–1941), American economist and racial theorist

== Stage names ==
- Rhea Ripley, ring name of Australian professional wrestler Demi Bennett (born 1996)

== Fictional characters ==
- Amanda Ripley, the daughter of Ellen Ripley in the Alien film series and the protagonist of the video game Alien: Isolation
- Cyd Ripley, from Best Friends Whenever
- Ellen Ripley, the protagonist of the Alien film series
- Justin Ripley, a detective sargeant and John Luther's loyal right-hand man in the television series Luther
- Ripley Ryan, a supervillain from the Marvel Comics
- Sailor Ripley, ex-con lead from the film Wild at Heart by David Lynch
- The Ripley, fictional alien viruses in Stephen King's novel and film Dreamcatcher
- Tom Ripley, in The Talented Mr. Ripley and other novels and films

== Anthropomorphized things ==
- SpaceX Ripley, the instrumented mannequin aboard the first ISS space station SpaceX Crew Dragon space capsule test flight Crew Dragon Demo-1
