= Shipley =

Shipley may refer to:

== People ==
- Shipley (surname)
- Shipley Erskine, 14th Earl of Buchan (1850–1934), Scottish nobleman and racehorse owner
- Shipley Jones (1850–1936), American banker, society leader and clubman

== Places ==
=== Australia ===
- Shipley, New South Wales

=== England ===
- Shipley, Derbyshire, a village
- Shipley, Northumberland, now in the parish of Eglingham
- Shipley, Shropshire, a village, see List of United Kingdom locations: Sg-Sh#Shi
- Shipley, West Sussex, a village
- Shipley, West Yorkshire, a town, near Bradford
  - Shipley (UK Parliament constituency)

=== United States ===
- Shipley, Oregon

== Other uses ==
- Shipley (1805 ship)
- Shipley School, Pennsylvania prep school
- Shipley Do-Nuts, a doughnut chain in Texas
- Shipley & Halmos, New York design firm
- Shiply, a goods transportation service
- Shepley, West Yorkshire, a village, near Huddersfield
