= Pat McAfee =

American sports analyst and athlete (born 1987)

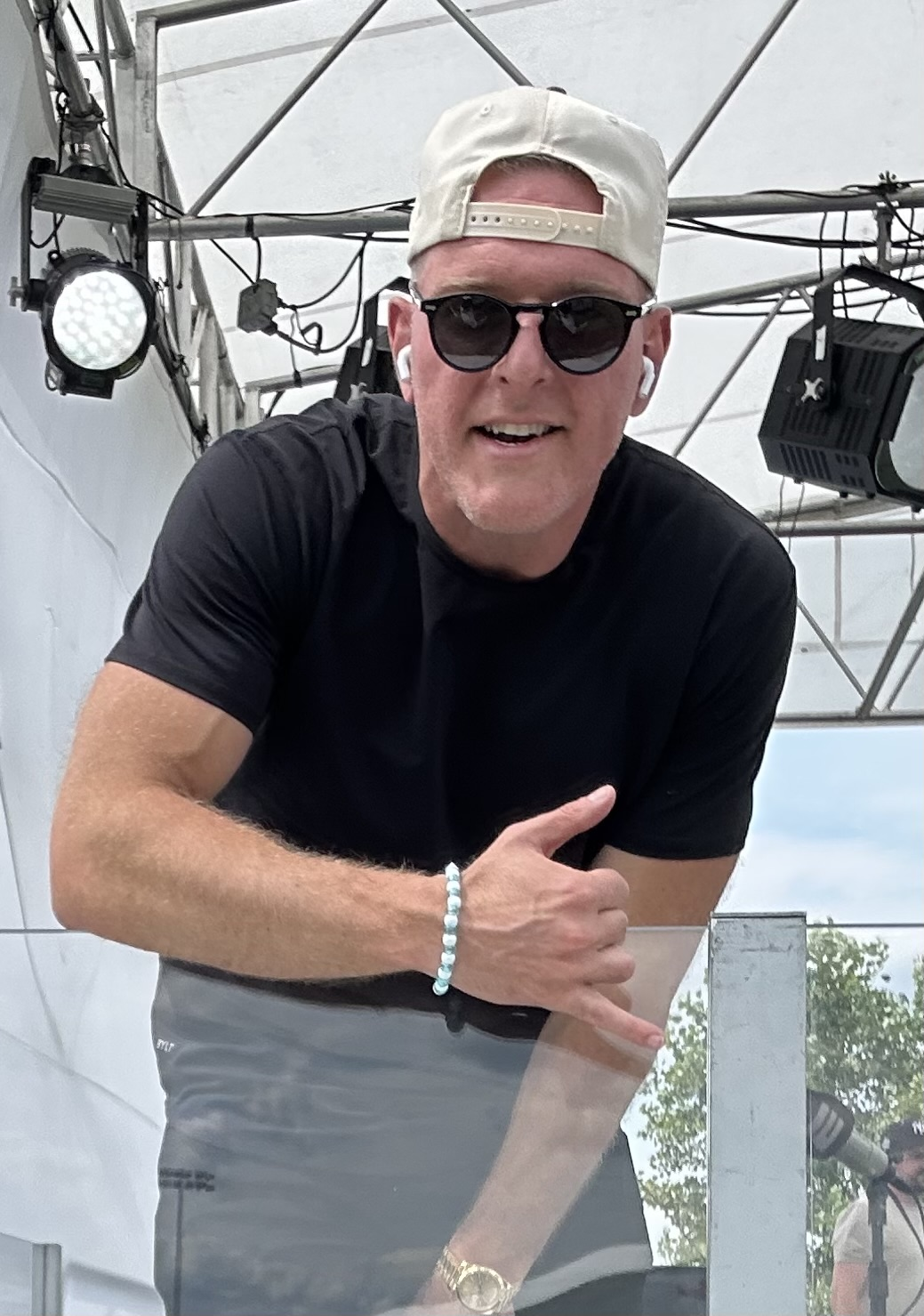
- McAfee in 2026
- Born: Patrick Justin McAfee; May 2, 1987 (age 39); Plum, Pennsylvania, U.S.
- Occupations: Football player (2009–2016); Professional wrestler (2020–2026); TV host (2018–present) ESPN College Gameday host
- Spouse: Samantha Ludy (m. 2020)
- Children: 2
- Professional wrestling career
- Ring name: Pat McAfee
- Billed height: 6 ft 1 in (185 cm)
- Billed weight: 233 lb (106 kg)
- Billed from: Pittsburgh, Pennsylvania by way of Indianapolis, Indiana
- Trained by: Rip Rogers; WWE Performance Center
- Debut: August 22, 2020
- Retired: April 18, 2026
- Football career

No. 1
- Positions: Punter, kickoff specialist

Personal information
- Listed height: 6 ft 1 in (1.85 m)
- Listed weight: 233 lb (106 kg)

Career information
- High school: Plum (Plum, Pennsylvania)
- College: West Virginia (2005–2008)
- NFL draft: 2009: 7th round, 222nd overall pick

Career history
- Indianapolis Colts (2009–2016)

Awards and highlights
- First-team All-Pro (2014); 2× Pro Bowl (2014, 2016); PFWA All-Rookie Team (2009); First-team All-American (2008)

Career NFL statistics
- Punts: 575
- Punting yards: 26,653
- Punting average: 46.4
- Longest punt: 74
- Inside 20: 193
- Stats at Pro Football Reference

Patrick Justin McAfee (/ˈmækəfi/ MAK-ə-fee; born May 2, 1987) is an American sports analyst, color commentator, former professional wrestler, and former professional football punter and kickoff specialist. He is an analyst on College GameDay and the host of the sports talk show The Pat McAfee Show on ESPN. In professional wrestling, he is best known for his tenure in WWE, as a color commentator and an occasional wrestler.

McAfee was a placekicker for the West Virginia Mountaineers. He was selected by the Indianapolis Colts in the seventh round of the 2009 NFL draft. He played in Super Bowl XLIV in his rookie year, where the Colts lost against the New Orleans Saints. McAfee made two Pro Bowls, and he was an All-Pro in 2014, during his seven-year career in the National Football League (NFL).

Since retiring from football in February 2017, McAfee has been a football analyst. He was a guest host for Fox Sports' college and NFL broadcasts in late 2018, before being announced as part of ESPN's Thursday Night College Football team in July 2019. In addition, he makes regular appearances for Get Up!. He currently licenses The Pat McAfee Show to the ESPN network, which then simulcasts the show on ESPN+ and is also broadcast on YouTube. He also is on ESPN’s College Gameday, he is joined by Nick Saban, Desmond Howard, Kirk Herbstreit, and Rece Davis.

McAfee served as a guest commentator for WWE's NXT TakeOver events in 2018, before signing a contract with the promotion in February 2019. During 2020, he feuded with Adam Cole, making his WWE NXT in-ring debut at TakeOver XXX in a loss to Cole. He served as a color commentator for major pay-per-views and SmackDown on numerous occasions and stints throughout the 2020s, only to take hiatuses to focus on his work at College GameDay from late summer to mid-late winter the next year. McAfee returned to the WWE on December 14, 2024, to call Saturday Night's Main Event with Michael Cole and Jesse Ventura in the Main Event and partnered with Cole again for commentary on Raw on Netflix in 2025. In 2026, McAfee returned on SmackDown and briefly aligned with Randy Orton before leaving once again after WrestleMania 42.

== Early life ==
McAfee was born to Tim and Sally McAfee on May 2, 1987, in Plum, a suburb of Pittsburgh, Pennsylvania. He attended Plum High School where he played varsity soccer, volleyball and football. He received collegiate interest for each sport. He was a national Punt, Pass, and Kick champion by the time he was a sophomore in high school. During his senior year in high school, using $1,400 that he won at an illegal poker game, he traveled to Miami to participate in a national field goal competition. McAfee made nine consecutive field goals, starting at 25 yards and moving five yards out each time. He narrowly missed a 70-yard field goal, with the ball missing to the right, but with enough distance in order to make it. He was then approached by Tony Gibson, West Virginia's recruiting coordinator, who offered him a scholarship.

== College career ==
=== Freshman season (2005) ===
McAfee earned the starting job at West Virginia as a freshman where he majored in communications. He was 11-for-18 as a freshman on field goals, and had 70 kickoffs for the season, with 20 touchbacks. McAfee's most memorable moment came against Louisville in a 46–44 triple-overtime win, which was reached after a successful McAfee onside kick. The onside kick gave running back Steve Slaton the chance to tie the game with a one-yard touchdown run.

=== Sophomore season (2006) ===
Although they had losses to Louisville and USF, the Mountaineers won 10 games and were victors in the Gator Bowl over Georgia Tech.

=== Junior season (2007) ===
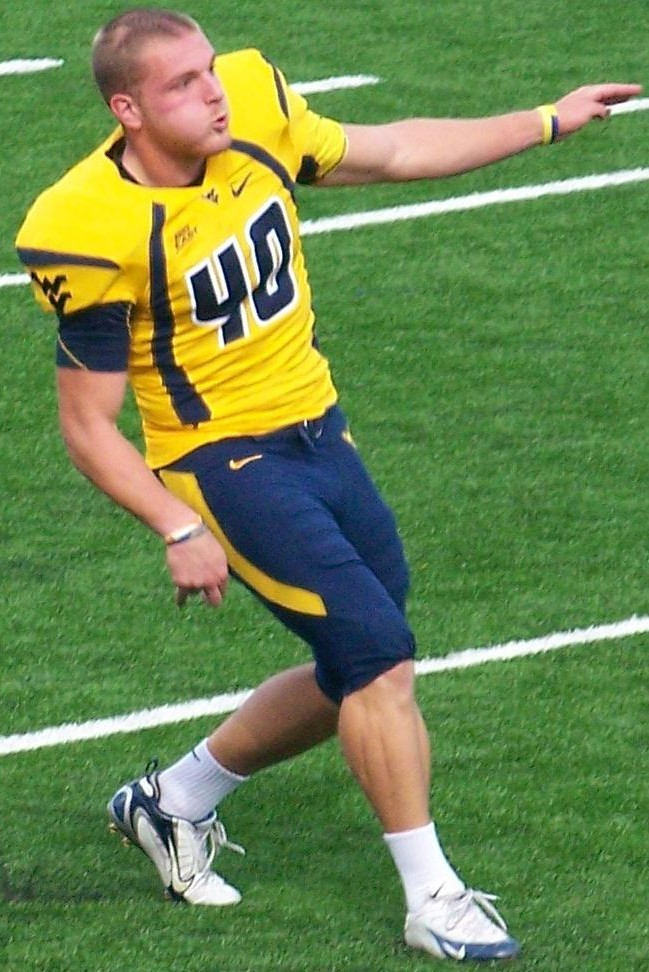
McAfee with the West Virginia Mountaineers in 2007

McAfee started his junior season with a missed extra point against Western Michigan, ending his streak of 106 consecutive extra points. He finished the season in the Fiesta Bowl with a 2-for-4 performance, having one kick blocked by Oklahoma. He was named to the ESPN All-Bowl Team following the bowl season.

McAfee missed two relatively short field goals in WVU's 13–9 loss to a Pitt Panthers team with only four wins; ultimately taking the Mountaineers out of the BCS National Championship Game. He was named to the 2007 Lou Groza Award semi-finalist list for the best collegiate kicker. McAfee earned Big East Special Team Player of the week honors three times in 2007 and was named second-team All-Big East. He earned West Virginia's Scott Shirley Award for the second consecutive year.

=== Senior season (2008) ===
McAfee warming up at halftime

McAfee began his senior year in a 48–21 season-opening victory over Villanova in which he kicked two field goals, including a career long of 52 yards, six extra points, and two punts. In the following 27–3 win over Marshall, McAfee became the school record holder for all-time scoring with a field goal, passing Slaton. He went two for two on field goals to move to third place for the Big East record of career field goals made in a 34–17 victory over Auburn.

Against Cincinnati on November 8, the Mountaineers trailed by 13 points with 1:11 left in regulation, but reduced the deficit to 3 points with a safety, touchdown, and two-point conversion, all in less than a minute. McAfee's onside kick was recovered with 18 seconds remaining. He then tied the game as time expired with a 52-yard field goal, but the Mountaineers would lose in overtime.

McAfee finished his senior year with a career-best 44.7 yards per punt average, a Big East-leading 23 punts inside the 20-yard line, and a career-high 2,639 yards with a 65-yard long. He was named a finalist for the Ray Guy Award losing out to Matt Fodge.

== Professional career ==
Pre-draft measurables
Height	Weight	40-yard dash	Wonderlic
5 ft 11 1/2 in (1.82 m)	228 lb (103 kg)	5.00 s	37
All values from NFL Draft

McAfee was invited to the 2009 Senior Bowl in Alabama, joining Mountaineers Pat White and Ellis Lankster. He started the Senior Bowl as the South team's kicker. McAfee performed in the 11th annual State Farm College Football All-Star Challenge, winning the "round the world" kicking competition. He was not invited to the NFL Combine. He had team workouts as a kicker with the Indianapolis Colts, Dallas Cowboys and New England Patriots.

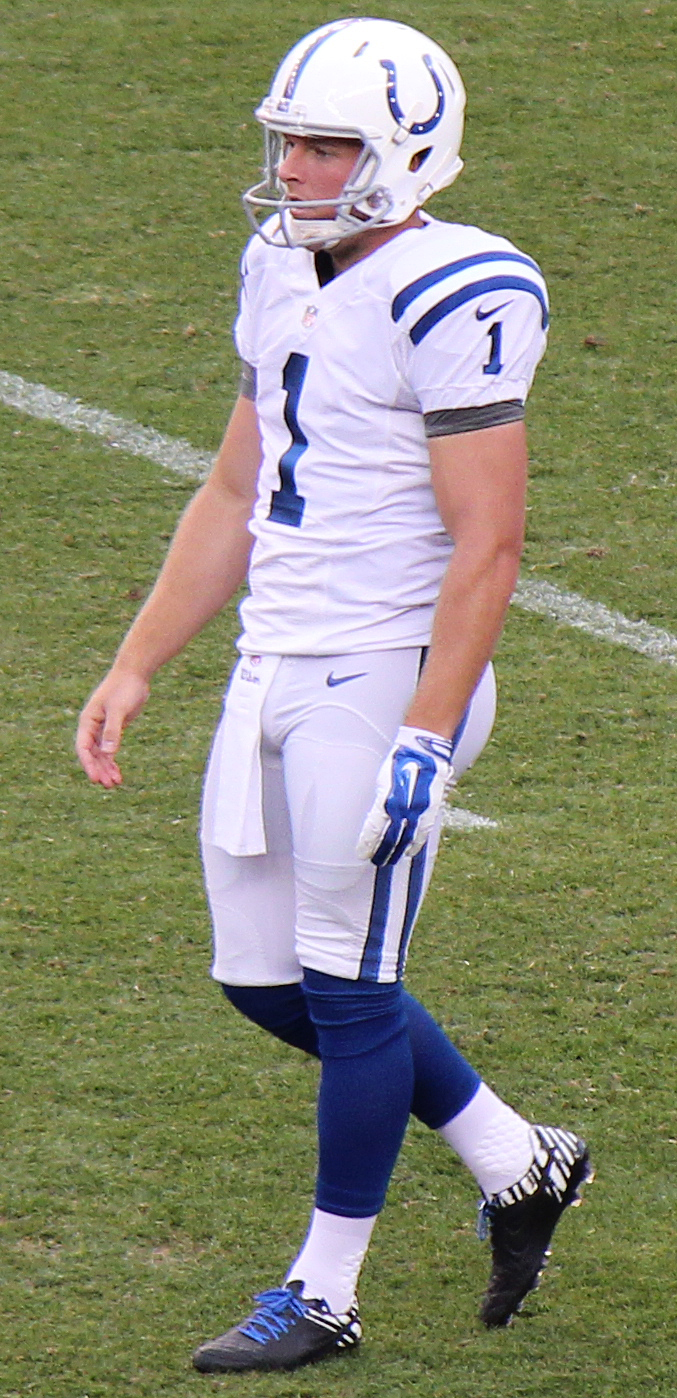
McAfee with the Indianapolis Colts in 2014

McAfee was selected in the seventh round with the 222nd overall pick in the 2009 NFL draft by the Indianapolis Colts. McAfee was signed before training camp. He handled punting and kick-off duties for the Colts in 2009, as well as holding for extra points and field goals, a position he had never played before. In 2009, McAfee was part of the Indianapolis team that won the AFC South, the AFC Championship, and reached Super Bowl XLIV. McAfee kicked off the game and handled kickoff and punt duties in the 31–17 loss to the New Orleans Saints. As a result of a successful 2009 season, he was named to the 2009 NFL All-Rookie Team.

McAfee maintained a 46.6-yard punting average for the 2011 season, a mark he would better the following season by posting a 48.2-yard average on punts.

On January 4, 2014, McAfee tweeted a photo from the Colts locker room with teammate Andrew Luck almost completely nude in the background. McAfee, who was taking a picture of kicker Adam Vinatieri being interviewed in the locker room, apologized for the incident and was fined $10,000 by the Colts organization, according to his interview with The Bob & Tom Show. On March 7, McAfee announced he had signed a five-year contract to remain with the Colts.

McAfee was named the AFC Special Teams Player of the Month for September 2014. He led the NFL in punting average (45.6 yards) and touchbacks on kickoff (24), and converted the NFL's only two successful onside kicks in the first four weeks of the season. In Week 6, against the Houston Texans, McAfee converted his third onside kick of the season, recovering the ball himself after it traveled the necessary 10 yards. On December 23, 2014, McAfee was selected to play in his first Pro Bowl, and on January 2, 2015, he was selected by the Associated Press as the First Team All-Pro punter.

In Week 3 of the 2015 season, McAfee earned AFC Special Teams Player of the Week against the Tennessee Titans. During this season he nearly entered a game as emergency quarterback after all three of the team's three listed quarterbacks on the team came down with injuries; however, he never officially took the field. McAfee held the role of emergency quarterback at the Colts throughout his tenure with the team, and was one of only four punters in the NFL to hold the role near the end of his career. He was also called on to throw the football during special plays involving a fake punt. On December 20, 2016, McAfee was named to his second Pro Bowl.

Despite being a punter, McAfee had several notable tackles in his career, including a hit on Trindon Holliday in Week 7 of the 2013 season, about which television commentator Cris Collinsworth said "Pat McAfee is going to be legend among kickers everywhere." He ended his career with 21 solo tackles, the third most for a punter in NFL history.

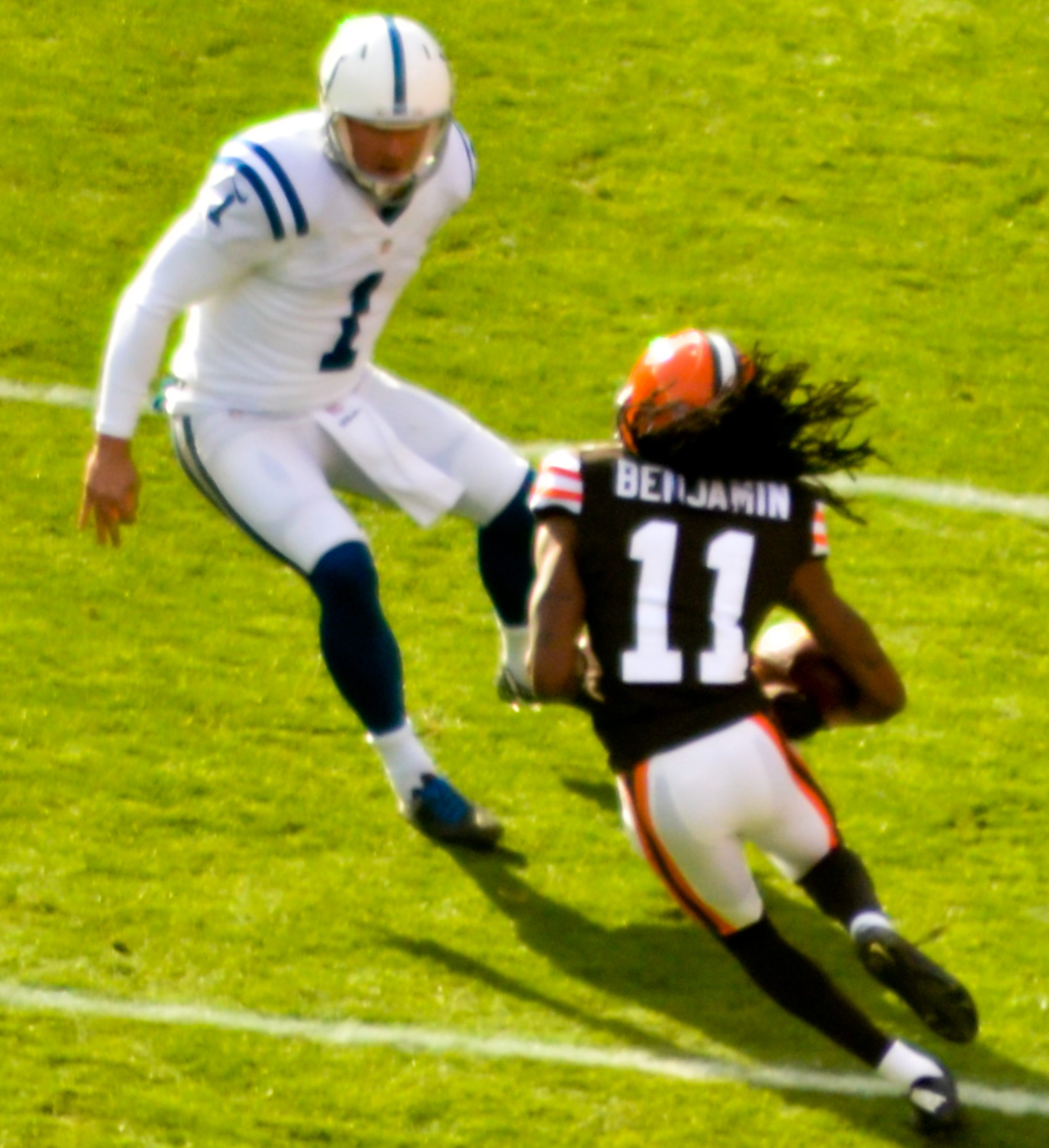
McAfee during a kickoff against the Cleveland Browns in 2014

On February 2, 2017, after eight seasons, McAfee retired from the NFL and stated he intended to join Barstool Sports as a contributor. He cited his recent knee operation (his third in four seasons) as a factor in his decision, as well as his fractured relationship with Colts' general manager Ryan Grigson. During the off-season in 2019, McAfee worked out with the Chicago Bears as a placekicker, but his knee swelled up soon afterwards, and the position was eventually taken by Eddy Piñeiro.

During the 2020 NFL season, despite being out of the NFL for four years, fans began making a push for McAfee to come out of retirement to play for his hometown Pittsburgh Steelers, who struggled with their punting during the season. McAfee himself added to the rumors by immediately tweeting a video of him punting after the Steelers released Dustin Colquitt without immediately signing a replacement. The team ended up re-signing Jordan Berry, who had been the team's punter for five years prior to the signing of Colquitt. On the September 16, 2021 episode of The Pat McAfee Show, Steelers head coach Mike Tomlin spoke of his admiration for him, joking that he would wait until McAfee "had physically deteriorated a little bit", until he could sign him. However, McAfee could have potentially played for the Tampa Bay Buccaneers as both a placekicker and punter, after the Buccaneers put their special teams unit on the reserve/COVID-19 list before their game against the Atlanta Falcons. Ultimately, McAfee was unable to bypass certain protocols because he did not test positive for COVID-19 antibodies, while Ryan Succop and Bradley Pinion ended up being cleared to play that weekend's game.

In September 2022, having met the requirement for election, McAfee was named as one of the additional modern-era nominees for the Pro Football Hall of Fame. After being told of the news on his show, he said he was flattered by the nomination, but stated that there were other punters more deserving of inclusion, such as Shane Lechler.

== NFL career statistics ==
Legend
	Led the league
**Bold**	Career high

=== Regular season ===
Year	Team	Punting														
Year	Team	GP	Punts	Yds	Net Yds	Lng	Avg	Net Avg	Blk	OOB	Dn	Ins20	TB	FC	Ret	RetY
2009	IND	**16**	64	2,837	2,416	60	44.3	37.8	0	0	7	21	6	15	36	301
2010	IND	15	65	2,731	2,302	66	42.0	35.4	0	3	8	21	7	22	25	289
2011	IND	**16**	**88**	**4,098**	3,488	64	46.6	39.2	**1**	8	11	21	3	18	**48**	**550**
2012	IND	**16**	73	3,520	2,985	64	48.2	40.3	**1**	**10**	9	26	8	14	32	375
2013	IND	**16**	76	3,499	2,963	65	46.0	38.6	**1**	8	**15**	27	7	17	29	396
2014	IND	**16**	69	3,221	2,956	61	46.7	**42.8**	0	7	5	**30**	3	19	35	205
2015	IND	**16**	85	4,052	**3,546**	63	47.7	41.7	0	7	13	28	6	**23**	36	386
2016	IND	**16**	55	2,711	2,392	**74**	**49.3**	42.7	**1**	7	5	19	**9**	17	17	139
Career		127	575	26,669	23,048	74	46.4	40.1	4	50	73	193	49	145	258	2,641

=== Postseason ===
Year	Team	Punting															
Year	Team	GP	Punts	Yds	Net Yds	Lng	Avg	Net Avg	Blk	OOB	Dn	Ins20	TB	FC	Ret	RetY	TD
2009	IND	**3**	**12**	**550**	**514**	56	45.8	42.8	0	0	0	**3**	1	**7**	4	16	0
2010	IND	1	4	153	138	46	38.3	34.5	0	0	**1**	1	0	2	1	15	0
2012	IND	1	4	194	137	53	48.5	34.3	0	0	0	0	0	0	4	**57**	0
2013	IND	2	6	310	268	58	**51.7**	**44.7**	0	0	0	0	0	0	**6**	42	0
2014	IND	2	8	375	296	**68**	46.9	37.0	0	**1**	**1**	1	**3**	0	3	19	0
Career		10	34	1,582	1,350	68	46.2	38.7	0	1	2	5	4	9	18	149	0

== Post-playing career ==
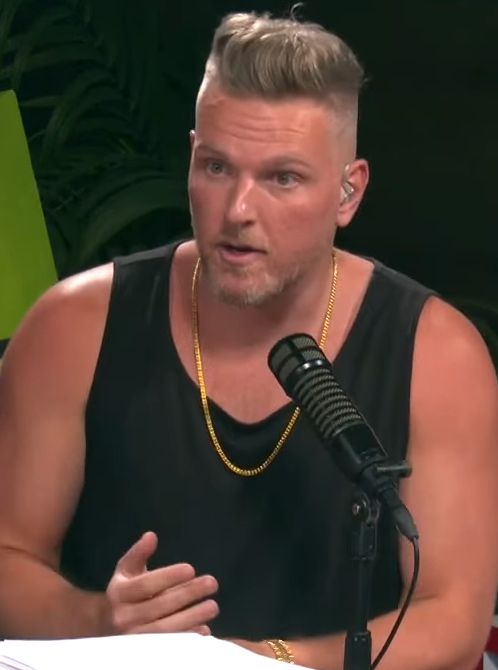
McAfee on The Pat McAfee Show in August 2022

Following his retirement, McAfee became a football analyst and a host of sports talk shows. After starting his own talk show, The Pat McAfee Show, he grew to become one of the most popular figures in the sports media industry, eventually earning an eight figure deal with ESPN.

=== Barstool Sports ===
During his final season with the Colts, McAfee began to perform stand-up comic routines about his time in the NFL. Following his retirement from football at the close of the 2016 season, McAfee joined Barstool Sports, where he developed the "Heartland" division of the company in Indianapolis and hosted The Pat McAfee Show on SiriusXM channel Barstool Power 85. McAfee announced his separation from Barstool Sports on August 31, 2018, citing a lack of transparency with the business operations of the company as his reason for leaving.

=== Pat McAfee Inc. ===
Upon departing from Barstool Sports in 2018, McAfee incorporated a small business, Pat McAfee Inc. (PMI), from his original office in Indianapolis. PMI continued to operate McAfee's charity, The Pat McAfee Foundation, and began selling merchandise. At first, PMI produced four podcasts, The Pat McAfee Show 2.0, That's Hockey Talk, Heartland Radio 2.0, and Good Bettor Bets. The former two are still in operation as of 2021, with The Pat McAfee Show 2.0 re-running clips from his daily show on SiriusXM, while That's Hockey Talk was originally co-hosted by former NFL center A. Q. Shipley, but Shipley was replaced by former NHL player Mike Rupp in 2021. Heartland Radio 2.0 evolved into The Pod after the departure of former host, Todd McComas, while PMI's gambling podcast, Good Bettor Bets, re-branded into Hammer Dahn with the addition of former NFL general manager Michael Lombardi as a guest co-host.

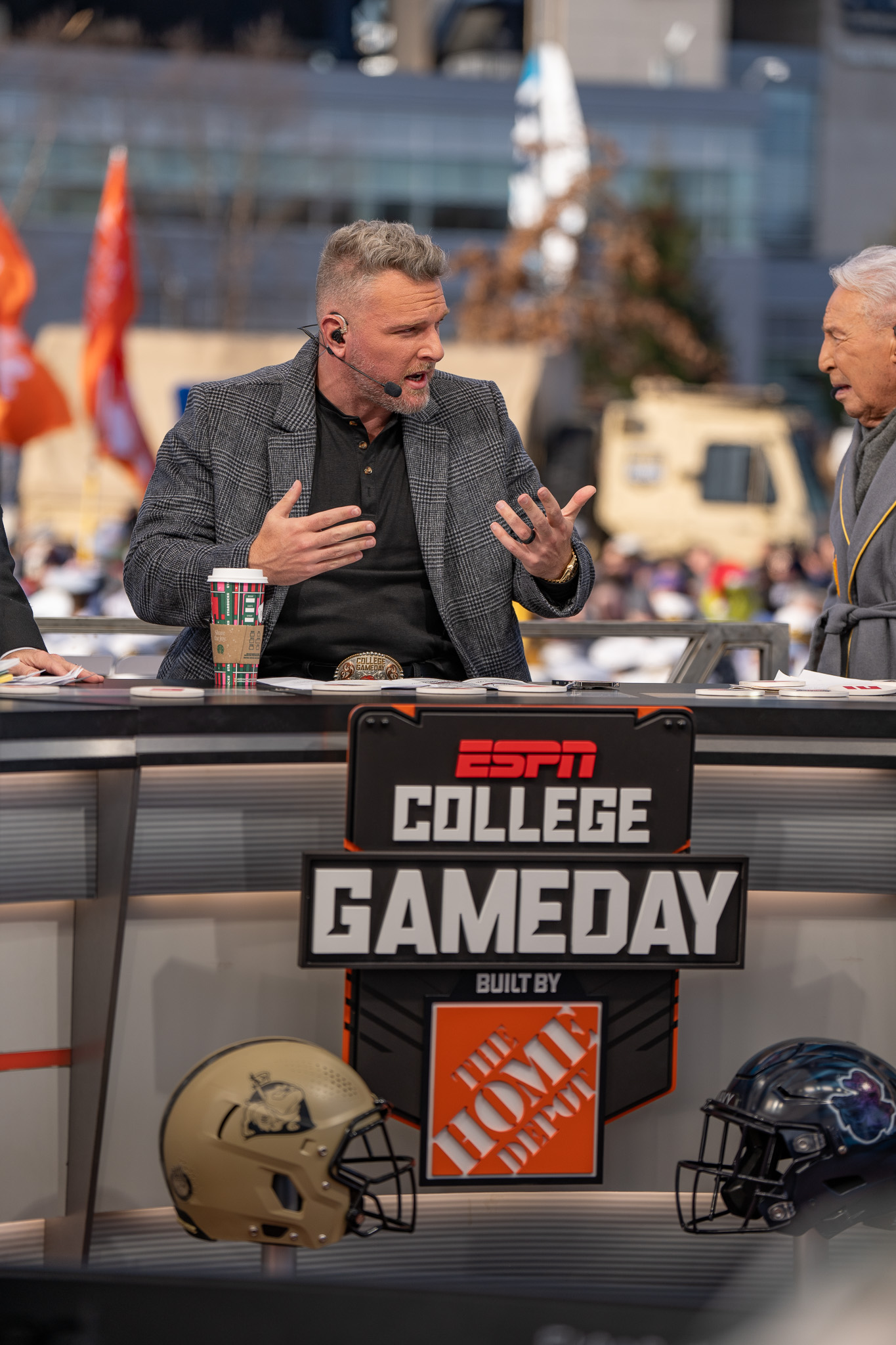
McAfee during a taping of College GameDay in 2023

On August 7, 2019, it was reported that McAfee would begin to host a two-hour, weekday radio show, The Pat McAfee Show, beginning September 9, 2019, syndicated by DAZN and Westwood One. The deal with DAZN also includes McAfee streaming his podcast on the service three times per week, and appearances in NFL-related shoulder content in regions where DAZN holds streaming rights to the league (primarily Canada and Germany). They parted ways in August 2020 due to McAfee's disdain for FCC regulations on terrestrial radio.

In September 2020, The Pat McAfee Show moved to SiriusXM's Mad Dog Sports Radio from 12 to 3 pm on weekdays. The show is also broadcast live on YouTube. Former NFL linebacker, and consistent collaborator, A. J. Hawk co-hosts the second and third hours of the show with McAfee. McAfee's former teammate Darius Butler co-hosts the show on Fridays when it is broadcast from Tampa, Florida. During the NFL season, McAfee frequently hosts Pittsburgh Steelers quarterback Aaron Rodgers on his program. Sirius XM stopped airing the show in August 2022.

In March 2021, PMI brought back The Best Wrestling Show, formerly known as Wrasslin' With Sports Entertainment, a wrestling podcast that had aired one episode in 2019. It is hosted by former WWE employee and PMI executive producer Mike Mansury, and Pittsburgh-based radio commentator & former World Championship Wrestling commentator Mark Madden. The podcast was short-lived, as Mansury left PMI to focus on independent work in May of the same year and the low viewership numbers caused by Madden.

In 2021, McAfee announced plans to move PMI's base of operations to a former United Methodist Church in Lawrence, Indiana.

On December 9, 2021, McAfee announced a four-year, $120 million sponsorship agreement with FanDuel to serve as the sponsor and official odds provider of The Pat McAfee Show.

=== Fox Sports ===
On November 24, 2018, McAfee made his college football broadcasting debut on Fox, calling a college football game between Baylor and Texas Tech. On December 30, McAfee made his NFL broadcasting debut on Fox, joining Justin Kutcher, Robert Smith, and sideline reporter Sarah Kustok for the Lions–Packers game.

=== ESPN ===
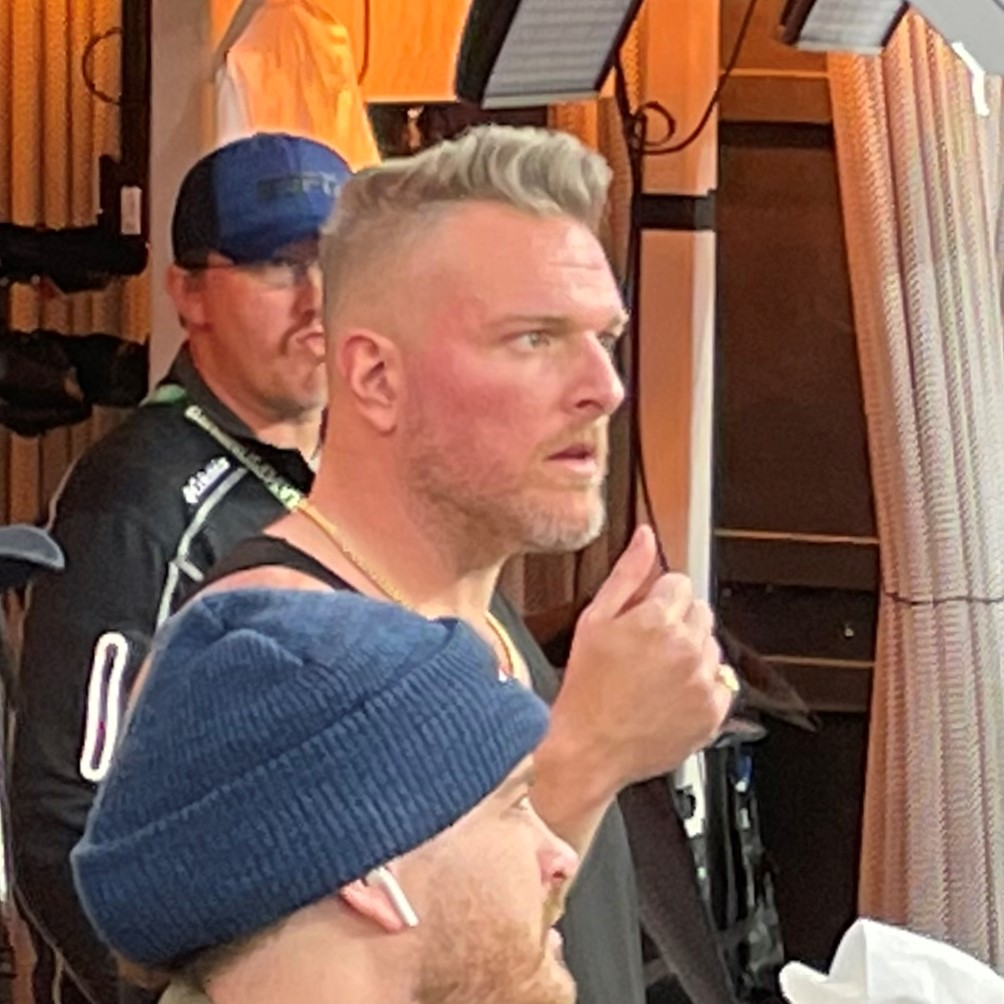
McAfee preparing for ESPN2's live "Field Pass" with The Pat McAfee Show for the 2023 CFP title game

On July 29, 2019, Adam Schefter announced via Twitter that McAfee would be joining ESPN as the color analyst for their Thursday Night College Football broadcasts, alongside Matt Hasselbeck. The news came after McAfee had auditioned for ESPN's Monday Night Football after Jason Witten's return to the Cowboys, though ESPN decided to retain its booth as is. In the same year, McAfee began making regular appearances on Get Up! and College GameDay, after appearing on the latter show as a celebrity guest picker.

In September 2022, it was announced that McAfee would be returning to ESPN. He serves as a full-time analyst on College Gameday. He will serve as an analyst for ESPN's coverage of the Rose Bowl, the College Football Playoff, the Super Bowl and Pro Bowl. McAfee is also a part of Peyton Manning's Omaha Productions college football alternate telecasts on ESPN2. He has appeared as a guest twice on Monday Night Football with Peyton and Eli.

In May 2023, ESPN announced that The Pat McAfee Show would move to its platforms, including ESPN television, ESPN+, and YouTube under a multi-year deal; McAfee stated that moving to ESPN would give him better access to "production assets, league rights capabilities, and access to everything in the sports world". On August 17, 2023, it was announced that The Pat McAfee Show would be making its debut on ESPN, ESPN+ and YouTube on September 7, 2023, the same day as the 2023 NFL season opener. Although the exact dollar amount of his deal with ESPN was not publicly disclosed, it has been reported to be over eight figures.

=== Music career ===
McAfee released his debut single, a country rock song titled "Dookie", in December 2025. His debut album, The Diary of a Polarizing Figure, released on August 14, 2026.

=== Controversy ===
Some of McAfee's work on ESPN has been controversial and resulted in legal repercussions. Although McAfee was only reporting on existing reports, in 2023 he faced defamation allegations from Brett Favre for claiming that the former quarterback stole money from "poor people in Mississippi."

On April 1, 2025, it was reported that his amplification of a false rumor about a student at the University of Mississippi had sparked harassment and bullying. McAfee talked about the false rumor with guests on his show and posted a clip of the discussion on X, captioned "What's going on at Ole Miss".

McAfee has also faced criticism for allowing Aaron Rodgers to promote anti-vaccine conspiracy theories on his show.

=== Other appearances ===
In 2016, McAfee performed in stand-up events around Indiana. McAfee was a regular on the nationally syndicated morning radio program The Bob & Tom Show, itself based in Indianapolis. He has described co-host Bob Kevoian as one of his best friends during an interview on the Off the Air Podcast hosted by sports commentator Chick McGee. In 2018, McAfee made his professional baseball debut for the Washington Wild Things as a right-fielder and guest first base coach. He made a putout in the outfield and went 0–3 at the plate, reaching second base on a throwing error before being replaced with a pinch runner.

He was a sideline reporter for the XFL for some of its games in 2020.

McAfee is a co-host on the sports gambling podcast Hammer Dahn, which is produced by his business, Pat McAfee Inc. He makes occasional appearances on PMI's other podcasts, The Pod and That's Hockey Talk.

He took part in The Soccer Tournament in 2024 as a player, and as a team manager in 2025.

== Professional wrestling career ==
=== Early involvement ===
McAfee is a self-professed lifelong fan of professional wrestling. A month prior to the 2009 NFL draft, he made a one-off guest appearance at an Independent Wrestling Association (IWA) East Coast show in South Charleston, West Virginia, where he wrestled and won a match. Following his retirement from football in 2017, he briefly trained with retired wrestler Rip Rogers.

=== WWE (2018–2026) ===
==== Sporadic appearances (2018–2020) ====
In March 2018, McAfee was present at an NXT show in Indianapolis, where he prevented Adam Cole from winning by disqualification in his match against Aleister Black. Instead, McAfee's distraction gave Black enough time to recover and hit Cole with his finisher, Black Mass.

During 2018, McAfee began appearing on WWE programming as a pre-show analyst for the company's NXT TakeOver events, beginning with NXT TakeOver: New Orleans, where he continued his mini-feud with Adam Cole. He later appeared at NXT TakeOver: Chicago II, NXT TakeOver: Brooklyn 4 and NXT TakeOver: WarGames. In December, it was reported that he had formally signed a multi-year contract with WWE, and officially signed the contract in February 2019. He then began hosting live watch-along of WWE's pay-per-views on YouTube, beginning with Fastlane, alongside a number of WWE wrestlers. In the buildup to WrestleMania 35, McAfee, his crew and various special guests travelled venue to venue in an RV, that his friend Zito got stuck under an awning at MetLife Stadium, which was filmed for Pat McAfee's Road to WrestleMania. Backstage at the event, McAfee got into an argument with Michael Cole, when Cole had criticized him for wearing tuxedo shorts. McAfee threatened to quit on the spot and was sent to another room while the situation was dealt with. After Vince McMahon was shown an image of LeBron James at the 2018 NBA Finals, and that the outfit was similar to the one McAfee was wearing for WrestleMania, McMahon approved and McAfee was allowed to co-host the second hour of the pre-show, alongside Charly Caruso.

McAfee made a guest appearance on the November 1, 2019 episode of SmackDown.

As part of NXT, he also was involved in storylines, including one with the NXT Champion Adam Cole. At NXT TakeOver XXX in August 2020, McAfee was defeated by Cole. McAfee's storyline included his own stable named The Kings of NXT, which included Pete Dunne, Ridge Holland, Danny Burch and Oney Lorcan. The feud between Undisputed Era and Kings of NXT concluded at NXT TakeOver: WarGames that December, where McAfee's team was defeated.

==== Color commentary (2021–2026) ====
McAfee served as a color commentator alongside Michael Cole on SmackDown from April 2021 to September 2022. During this period, he was involved in various storylines. At WrestleMania 38, McAfee would defeat Austin Theory, before challenging Mr. McMahon to an impromptu match straight after, which McMahon accepted and won. Following that match, Theory and McMahon would continue to attack McAfee until Stone Cold Steve Austin would interrupt and give all three of them a stunner. His next on-screen feud was with Baron Corbin, defeating him at SummerSlam.

At Royal Rumble on January 28, 2023, McAfee made a surprise return for commentary right before the men's Royal Rumble match began. McAfee did not make another appearance until WrestleMania 39, challenging The Miz to a match, and then going on to win in under 4 minutes after co-host Snoop Dogg made the match official.

On January 27, 2024, McAfee once again returned at Royal Rumble as a surprise guest commentator and surprise entrant at No. 22 in the men's Royal Rumble match. McAfee quickly exited the ring and eliminated himself. McAfee would later claim that he was unaware ahead of the event that he would be a participant in the men's Royal Rumble match. Two days later, McAfee made his full-time return to WWE on Raw as part of the new commentary team with Michael Cole. McAfee was announced as downloadable content for WWE 2K24. On August 19, he once again took a hiatus from WWE to return to College GameDay.

McAfee returned on the premiere of Raw on Netflix on January 6, 2025, once again partnering with Michael Cole, and going on to become a full time commentator for the brand. On the April 21 episode of Raw, McAfee was attacked by Gunther after attempting to come to the aid of Michael Cole. This led to a match at Backlash on May 10 between Gunther and McAfee, where McAfee lost via technical submission. A day later on Raw, he joined Michael Cole in the booth to celebrate the life of Sabu, who died on May 11. In June 2025, McAfee announced that he would be taking another hiatus from commentating due to mental exhaustion. On September 20, 2025, McAfee made his return as a commentator for Wrestlepalooza in Indianapolis.

==== Brief alliance with Randy Orton and retirement (2026) ====
On the April 3, 2026 episode of SmackDown, McAfee returned to WWE, aligning himself with Randy Orton and being revealed to be Orton's mystery phone caller, a decision that was universally panned by both audiences and critics alike. He assisted Orton in assaulting Undisputed WWE Champion Cody Rhodes weeks ahead of Orton's and Rhodes's main event championship match at WrestleMania 42, turning heel for the first time since 2020. The following week on SmackDown, McAfee declared that if Orton were to lose at WrestleMania 42, he would leave the professional wrestling business forever. At the event on April 18, Orton lost to Rhodes despite interference from McAfee who was attacked by Orton during the match. This would turn out to be McAfee’s final appearance in WWE. On April 20 on his talk show, McAfee confirmed that he had left WWE, ending his eight-year tenure with the promotion.

== Personal life ==
On October 20, 2010, McAfee was arrested and charged with public intoxication, a Class B misdemeanor. McAfee was found shirtless and wet, and alleged to have swum in a canal in Broad Ripple, a popular nightclub area in Indianapolis, at approximately 5:15 that morning after being reported by a woman who found him near her car. Police reported that he tested with a blood alcohol content of 0.15. The Colts later issued a one-game suspension to McAfee for his actions. Two weeks after being arrested, McAfee issued an apology for his actions. "Obviously I made a dumb decision on a night when things got out of control," he said. "I will never put my team or my family through this kind of embarrassment again."

On February 5, 2016, McAfee became a Guinness World Record holder by successfully kicking a 40-yard field goal while blindfolded. The record was surpassed two years later when Davis Brief, a fan of McAfee's, kicked a 45-yard field goal while blindfolded on September 23, 2018.

McAfee became engaged to Samantha Ludy in February 2019. The two married August 1, 2020, at Coxhall Gardens in Carmel, Indiana, with Bob Kevoian from the Bob & Tom Show officiating. The couple welcomed their first child, a daughter, on May 4, 2023. On November 30, 2025, McAfee and his wife Samantha announced that they were expecting their second child together. On May 25, 2026, the couple welcomed their second child, a boy.

McAfee is good friends with fellow wrestler and fellow former football player Thomas Pestock, best known by his ring name Baron Corbin. They were teammates while a part of the Indianapolis Colts and roommates during their rookie year. They bonded over their love for wrestling and eventually would work a match together at SummerSlam 2022.

== Philanthropy ==
In 2020, McAfee donated $200,000 to the Barstool Fund, a charity started by Dave Portnoy to provide relief to small businesses impacted by the COVID-19 pandemic. In 2021, he donated over $6 million to various causes, including sports teams at his hometown high school Plum, the children's hospital at West Virginia University, and a football program for under-privileged youth run by former teammate Robert Mathis.

Since 2023, as a co-host of ESPN's College GameDay, McAfee has hosted the "Kicking is Easy" contest, giving college students an opportunity to kick a field goal to win prize money. Through the 2025 season, McAfee given a total of $3.7 million to students.

In October 2026, also as co-host of ESPN's College GameDay, McAfee pledged a $1 million gift to the University of Iowa Stead Family Children’s Hospital.

== Discography ==
=== Solo studio albums ===
- The Diary of a Polarizing Figure (2026)

=== Singles ===
- "Dookie" (2025)

== Filmography ==
=== Film ===
Year	Title	Role	Notes	Ref(s)
2026	The Mosquito Bowl	Drill Instructor		
2026	Hexed †	Rat McAfee	Voice role	

=== Television ===
Television
Year	Title	Role	Notes	Ref.
2026	Tulsa King	Detective Mackenzie	2 episodes	

== Championships and accomplishments ==
- Wrestling Observer Newsletter
  - Rookie of the Year (2020)
  - Worst Match of the Year (2022) vs. Vince McMahon at WrestleMania 38
- WWE
  - NXT Year-End Award (1 time)
    - Rivalry of the Year (2020) vs. Adam Cole

== See also ==
- List of gridiron football players who became professional wrestlers
