= Ridley (name) =

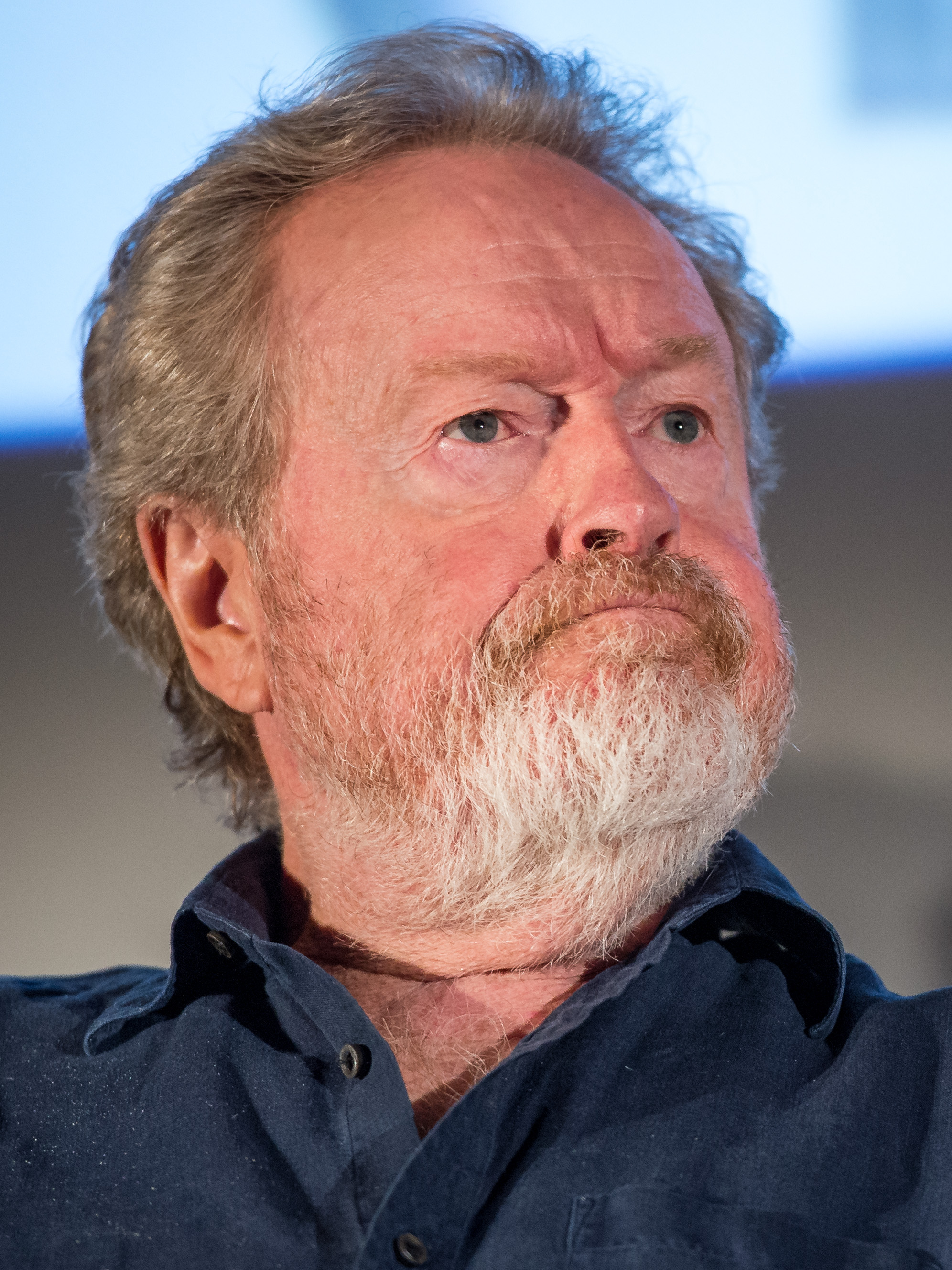
- Ridley Scott
- Pronunciation: /ˈridli/
- Gender: Primarily male
- Language: English

Origin
- Language: Old English
- Origin: Combination of hrēod and lēah or rydde and lēah
- Meaning: "reeds" + "wood" or "clearing", or "cleared land" + "wood" or "clearing".
- Region of origin: England

Other names
- Variant form: Ridly
- Related names: Ripley

Ridley is a surname and given name that originated from locations in Cheshire, Kent, Northumberland, and Essex counties in England. The name derives from Old English, either hrēod (reeds) + lēah (wood or clearing), or rydde (cleared land) + lēah.

== Surname ==
- Ridley (surname)

== Given name ==
- Ridley Burton (1893–1974), English professional footballer
- Ridley Bent (born 1979), Canadian country singer-songwriter
- Ridley Duppuy (1881–1944), Anglican bishop
- Ridly Greig (born 2002), Canadian professional ice hockey player
- Ridley Haim Herschell (1807–1864), Polish-born British minister
- Ridley Jacobs (born 1967), West Indian cricketer
- Ridley McLean (1872–1933), US Navy Admiral
- Ridley Pakenham-Walsh (1888–1966), British general
- Ridley Pearson (born 1953), American Author
- Ridley Plaisted (1885–1954), Australian rules footballer
- Ridley Scott (born 1937), English film director
- Ridley Wills II (born 1934), American author and historian

== See also ==
- Viscount Ridley, a title created in 1900 for Matthew Ridley, 1st Viscount Ridley
