= Will Hernandez =

American football player (born 1995)

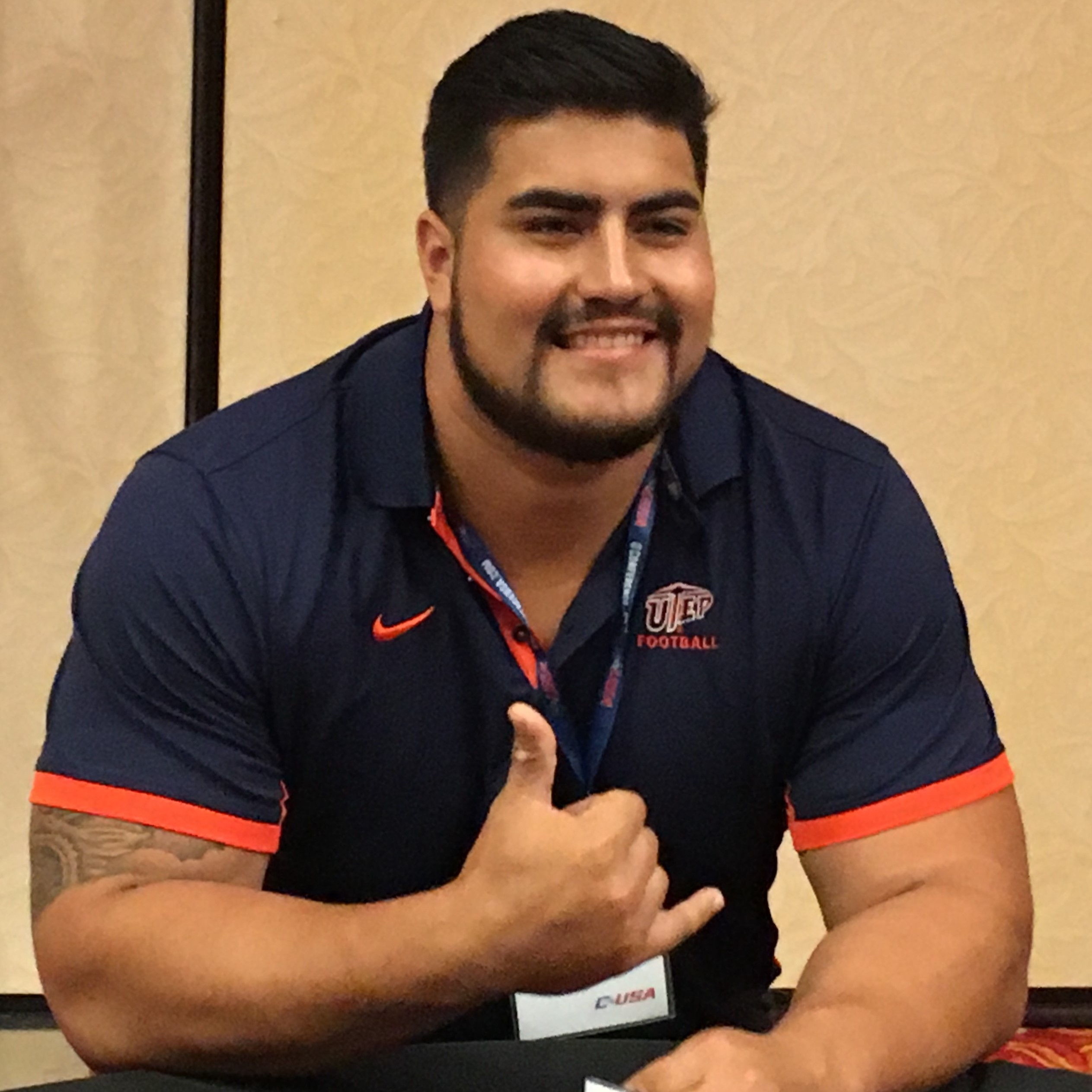
- Hernandez at 2017 C-USA Media Days

Profile
- Position: Guard / Center

Personal information
- Born: September 2, 1995 (age 31); Las Vegas, Nevada, U.S.
- Listed height: 6 ft 2 in (1.88 m)
- Listed weight: 332 lb (151 kg)

Career information
- High school: Chaparral (Las Vegas)
- College: UTEP (2013–2017)
- NFL draft: 2018: 2nd round, 34th overall pick

Career history
- New York Giants (2018–2021); Arizona Cardinals (2022–2025)

Awards and highlights
- PFWA All-Rookie Team (2018); 2x Second-team All-American (2016, 2017); 2x First-team All C-USA (2016, 2017)

Career NFL statistics as of 2025
- Games played: 104
- Games started: 98
- Stats at Pro Football Reference

William Hernandez (born September 2, 1995) is an American professional football offensive lineman. He played college football for the UTEP Miners.

== Early life ==
Hernandez was born to a Mexican family in Las Vegas, Nevada. He was a four-year letterer and three-year starter at Chaparral High School in Paradise, Nevada, where he played offensive line, defensive end, and middle linebacker. Will actually quit football after his freshman year to instead work as a manager for his father's construction company, but was talked into rejoining the team before his junior year by his head coach, who saw extreme potential in Hernandez. As a senior, Hernandez was an all-Nevada offensive lineman and was an all-conference defensive end; he started all games at right guard, and registered 42 tackles, eight sacks, one interception, five forced fumbles and two fumble recoveries on defense.

A zero-star recruit, Hernandez was recruited very lightly; despite receiving walk-on offers from Nevada, UNLV, and Wyoming, Will accepted an offer from UTEP, the only college to offer him a scholarship. Outside of football, Hernandez also lettered in track, powerlifting, wrestling, and soccer.

== College career ==
After redshirting his first year at UTEP in 2013, Hernandez was immediately named a starter as a redshirt freshman and would start every game for the rest of his collegiate career; 49 games in total from 2014 to 2017. After the 2016 season, Hernandez was a second-team All-American. Although UTEP went 0-12 and were ranked dead last in the FBS in 2017, Hernandez nonetheless was named to the All-Conference USA offensive line, and was called the "sole bright spot on a very dismal season". He was also invited to the College Football All-Star Challenge, and also participated in the NFL Combine.

== Professional career ==
External videos
- NFL Draft Profile: Will Hernandez
- Will Hernandez's NFL Combine Workout
- Hernandez puts up 37 reps on bench press

Pre-draft measurables
Height	Weight	Arm length	Hand span	Wingspan	40-yard dash	10-yard split	20-yard split	20-yard shuttle	Three-cone drill	Vertical jump	Broad jump	Bench press
6 ft 2 3/8 in (1.89 m)	327 lb (148 kg)	32 in (0.81 m)	9 7/8 in (0.25 m)	6 ft 5 3/4 in (1.97 m)	5.15 s	1.76 s	2.96 s	4.70 s	7.59 s	27.0 in (0.69 m)	8 ft 8 in (2.64 m)	37 reps
All values from NFL Combine/Pro Day

=== New York Giants ===
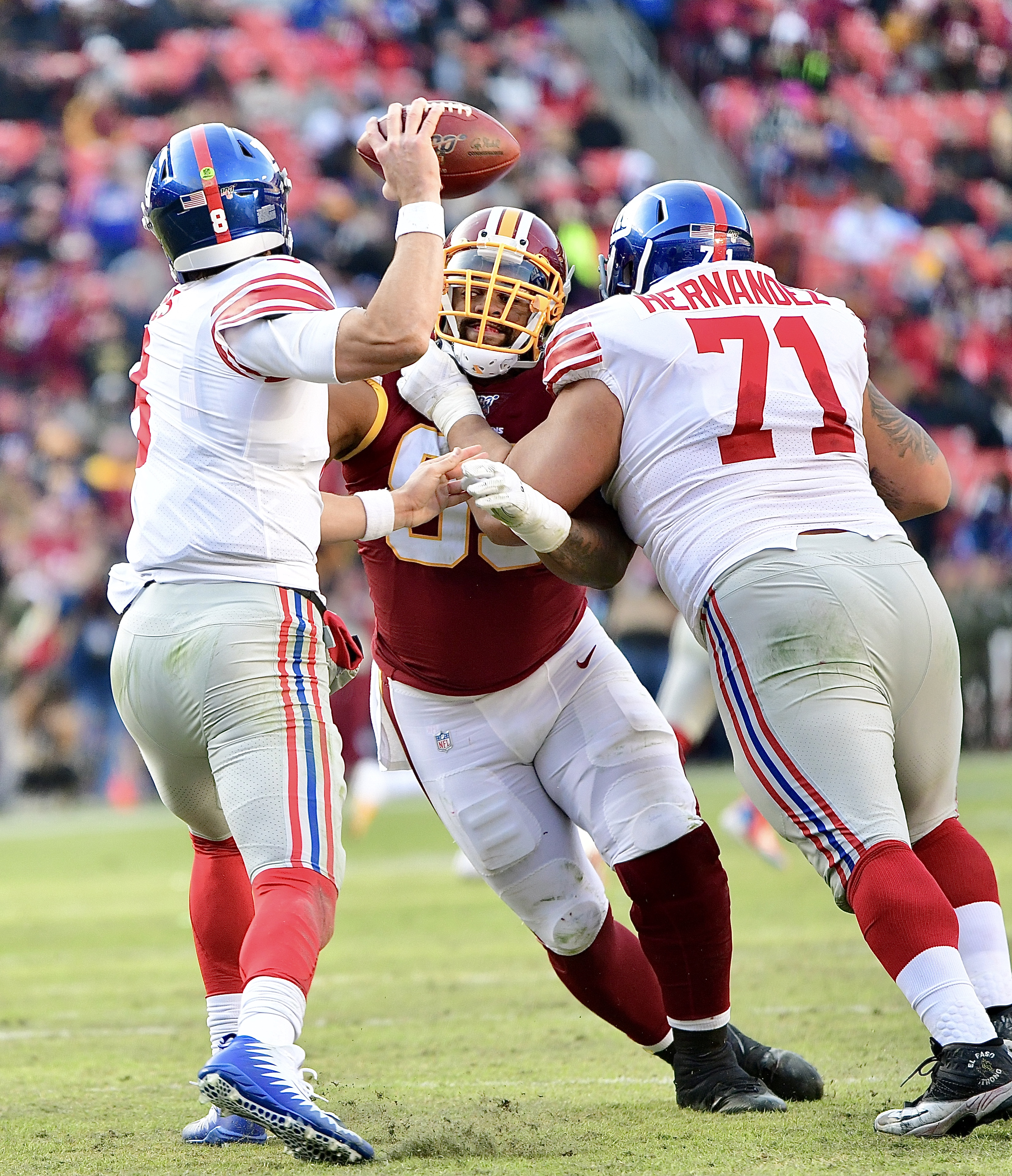
Hernandez in a game against the Washington Redskins

The New York Giants selected Hernandez in the second round (34th overall) of the 2018 NFL draft. Hernandez was the second guard drafted in 2018, behind Notre Dame's Quenton Nelson (sixth overall).

External videos
- Giants draft Hernandez 34th overall
- Jones: "Hernandez will be an instant starter"

On May 12, 2018, the Giants signed Hernandez to a four-year, $7.45 million contract that included $5.08 million guaranteed and a signing bonus of $3.49 million.

Hernandez was named the Giants starting left guard to start 2018, starting all 16 games and was named to the Pro Football Writers of America All-Rookie Team.

On October 29, 2020, Hernandez was placed on the reserve/COVID-19 list by the Giants after he tested positive for COVID-19. On November 10, he returned to the active roster. However, despite his healthy return, he remained a backup for the remainder of the season, losing the starting left guard position to rookie Shane Lemieux.

=== Arizona Cardinals ===
On March 28, 2022, the Arizona Cardinals signed Hernandez to a one-year contract. In Week 4 game against the Carolina Panthers Hernandez was ejected in the fourth quarter for making contact with an official. He was placed on injured reserve on November 9 with a pectoral injury. He was activated on December 17.

On March 15, 2023, Hernandez signed a two-year contract extension with the Cardinals, worth up to $9 million, with $4.5 million fully guaranteed. He maintained his starting right guard job, starting every game in 2023.

Hernandez returned as a starter in 2024, starting each of Arizona's first 5 games before going down with a knee injury in week 5 against the San Francisco 49ers. On October 7, 2024, it was announced that the injury was season–ending, and he was placed on injured reserve.

On August 7, 2025, Hernandez re-signed with the Cardinals. He returned in Week 5 as the starting left guard, then started the next six games at right guard before being placed on injured reserve with hip and knee injuries on November 29.

== Personal life ==
Hernandez, whose parents are from Mexico City, has held football camps in Mexico as part of a wider effort to promote the sport abroad.
