= Zac Robinson =

American football player and coach (born 1986)

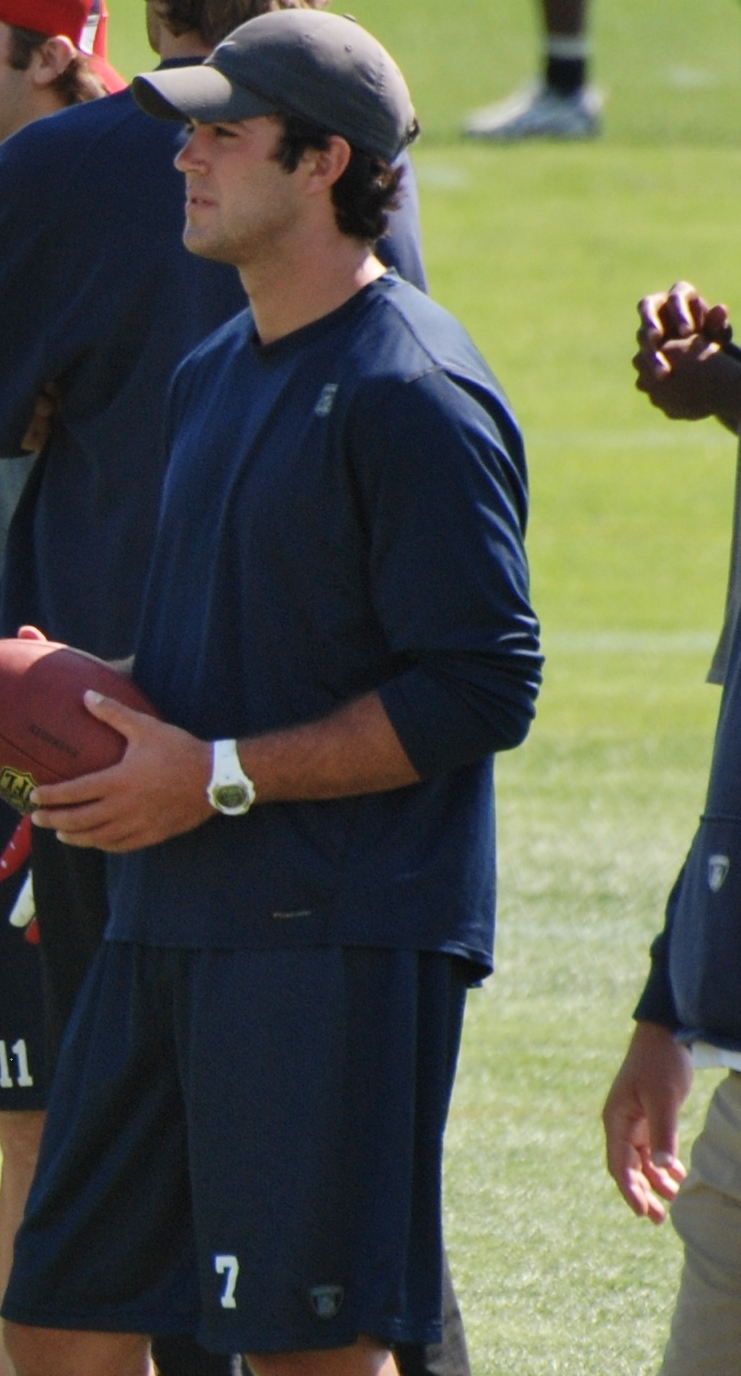
- Robinson with the New England Patriots in 2010

Tampa Bay Buccaneers
- Title: Offensive coordinator

Personal information
- Born: September 29, 1986 (age 40); Littleton, Colorado, U.S.
- Listed height: 6 ft 3 in (1.91 m)
- Listed weight: 208 lb (94 kg)

Career information
- Position: Quarterback
- High school: Chatfield (Littleton)
- College: Oklahoma State (2005–2009)
- NFL draft: 2010: 7th round, 250th overall pick

Career history

Playing
- New England Patriots (2010)*; Seattle Seahawks (2010); Detroit Lions (2010); Cincinnati Bengals (2011–2013)
- * Offseason or practice squad member only

Coaching
- Los Angeles Rams (2019–2023); Assistant quarterbacks coach (2019, 2021); Assistant wide receivers coach (2020); Pass game coordinator & quarterbacks coach (2022–2023); Atlanta Falcons (2024–2025) Offensive coordinator; Tampa Bay Buccaneers (2026–present) Offensive coordinator

Awards and highlights
- Super Bowl champion (LVI)
- Coaching profile at Pro Football Reference
- Stats at Pro Football Reference

Zachary Ross Robinson (born September 29, 1986) is an American professional football coach who is the offensive coordinator for the Tampa Bay Buccaneers of the National Football League (NFL). He previously served as the offensive coordinator for the Atlanta Falcons from 2024 to 2025. Robinson played college football as a quarterback at Oklahoma State Cowboys and was selected by the New England Patriots in the seventh round of the 2010 NFL draft. He was also a member of the Seattle Seahawks, Detroit Lions, and Cincinnati Bengals before retiring in 2013. Robinson became a coach in 2019, serving as an assistant coach for the Los Angeles Rams and the Falcons.

== Early life ==
Robinson attended Chatfield Senior High School in Littleton, Colorado, where he played football at multiple offensive positions. As a senior, Robinson threw for 1,475 yards, 15 touchdowns, and six interceptions. The same season, he also caught 39 passes for 850 yards and 11 touchdowns, while also rushing for 1,078 yards and eight touchdowns.

== College career ==
Following high school, Robinson attended Oklahoma State University, where he redshirted as a freshman in 2005. He was a reserve quarterback for the Cowboys in 2006, finishing the season with 345 yards on 51 attempts and three touchdowns, while also rushing for 144 yards.

In the second game of Robinson's 2007 sophomore season, he became the Cowboys' starter at quarterback and went on to lead his team to an appearance in the 2007 Insight Bowl, where he was the game MVP. After taking over the starting role, Robinson recorded 847 yards rushing and 2,824 yards passing and combined for 32 touchdowns. His 3,671 total offensive yards set a school record. In that season, the only other player in Division I FBS to rush for at least 800 yards and pass for 2,800 yards was Heisman Trophy winner Tim Tebow.

Robinson led Oklahoma State to the 2008 Holiday Bowl his junior season. He finished the 2008 regular season with 562 yards rushing with 8 touchdowns and 3,064 yards passing with 25 touchdowns.

Robinson was viewed as one of the best senior quarterbacks in the 2009 preseason. Robinson began the season with a win over Georgia, throwing for 135 yards and two touchdowns. However, his season took a turn when Cowboys running back Kendall Hunter suffered an injury and was sidelined for a good portion of the season while wide receiver Dez Bryant, who became a first round pick in the 2010 NFL draft, was suspended for the rest of the season, breaking up what Rivals.com had coined the "Best Offensive Trio of 2009." Later in the season, Robinson suffered a concussion and shoulder injury in a game against Texas Tech after colliding with Red Raider cornerback Jamar Wall. Robinson also suffered a hamstring injury at one point during the season and finished the year with 2,084 yards passing and 15 touchdowns on the season.

Robinson completed his Bachelor of University Studies degree at Oklahoma State in December 2013.

Robinson was one of six senior quarterbacks invited to the 2010 Senior Bowl in Mobile, Alabama. Of the six, only Robinson threw for more than 100 yards (176); Robinson was also responsible for the only South team touchdown. In addition, his showing at the 2010 College Football All-Star Challenge was described by ESPN analysts as the "Performance of the Day" out of the twelve participating players.

=== College statistics ===
Season	Team	Passing							Rushing			
Season	Team	Cmp	Att	Yds	Pct	TD	Int	Rtg	Att	Yds	Avg	TD
2006	Oklahoma State	25	51	345	49.0	3	0	125.3	29	144	5.0	1
2007	Oklahoma State	201	333	2824	60.4	23	9	149.0	140	847	6.1	9
2008	Oklahoma State	204	314	3064	65.0	25	10	166.8	146	562	3.8	8
2009	Oklahoma State	180	301	2084	59.8	15	12	126.4	111	305	2.7	4
Career		610	999	8317	61.1	66	31	146.6	426	1858	4.4	22

== Professional career ==
Pre-draft measurables
Height	Weight	Arm length	Hand span	40-yard dash	10-yard split	20-yard split	20-yard shuttle	Three-cone drill	Vertical jump	Broad jump
6 ft 2 1/2 in (1.89 m)	214 lb (97 kg)	31 1/4 in (0.79 m)	9 in (0.23 m)	4.71 s	1.63 s	2.72 s	4.40 s	7.24 s	35 in (0.89 m)	9 ft 2 in (2.79 m)
All values from NFL Scouting Combine

=== New England Patriots ===
Robinson was drafted by the New England Patriots in the seventh round (250th overall) of the 2010 NFL draft. He signed a four-year contract on July 21, 2010. He was released on September 4.

=== Seattle Seahawks ===
On September 5, 2010, the Seattle Seahawks signed Robinson to their practice squad.

On November 6, Robinson was activated to the active roster to serve as backup to Charlie Whitehurst in Week 9 against the New York Giants. He was waived on November 8.

=== Detroit Lions ===
On November 9, 2010, Robinson was claimed off waivers by the Detroit Lions. He was waived on September 3, 2011.

=== Cincinnati Bengals ===
On September 6, 2011, Robinson was signed to the Cincinnati Bengals' practice squad. After the season, he was signed to the offseason roster.

Robinson appeared in all four of the Bengals' preseason games in 2012, and although he was waived, Robinson was again signed to the practice squad at the end of preseason.

Prior to the 2013 season, Robinson was placed on the PUP list just before training camp due to an elbow injury. His season officially ended on December 10, when the Bengals left him on the PUP list, instead of activating him.

On May 2, 2014, Robinson was waived after failing his physical.

Robinson was invited to the NFL's inaugural veteran's combine in Arizona.

== Coaching career ==
=== Los Angeles Rams ===
On February 23, 2019, Robinson began his coaching career and was hired by the Los Angeles Rams as their assistant quarterbacks coach under head coach Sean McVay, following the departure of quarterbacks coach Zac Taylor, who was hired to become the head coach of the Cincinnati Bengals.

In 2020, it was announced that Robinson would switch positions from being the assistant quarterbacks coach to the assistant wide receivers coach. The following year, he switched back to assistant quarterbacks coach after Liam Coen left for Kentucky. The Rams won Super Bowl LVI when they defeated the Bengals. For the next two seasons, Robinson was the pass game coordinator and quarterbacks coach.

=== Atlanta Falcons ===
On January 29, 2024, Robinson was hired by the Atlanta Falcons to be their offensive coordinator under head coach Raheem Morris.

=== Tampa Bay Buccaneers ===
On January 22, 2026, Robinson was hired by the Tampa Bay Buccaneers as their offensive coordinator under head coach Todd Bowles.

== Personal life ==
Robinson and his wife, Mia, have two children: Madi and Cooper.
