= John Leonard Riddell =

American scientist (1807–1865)

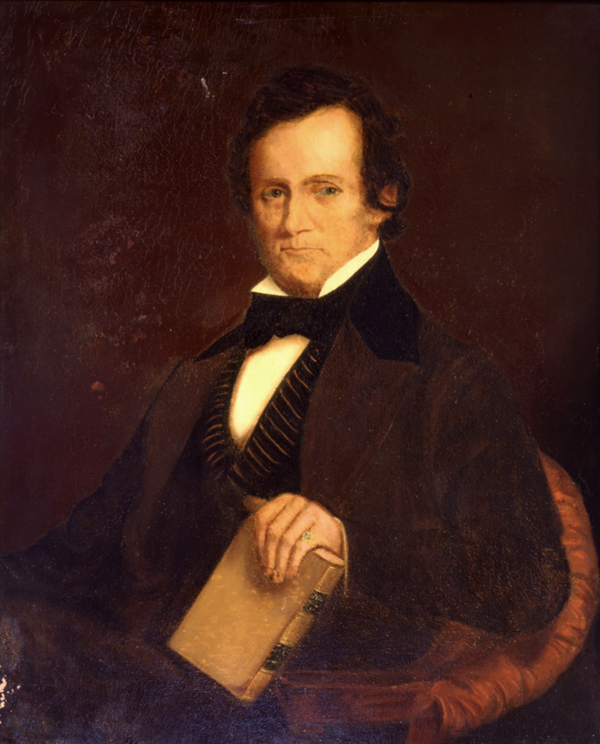
Riddell in 1850, painted by Theodore Sydney Moïse.

John Leonard Riddell (February 20, 1807 – October 7, 1865) was a science lecturer, botanist, geologist, medical doctor, chemist, microscopist, numismatist, politician, and science fiction author in the United States.

== Biography ==
Riddell was born in Leyden, Massachusetts, the first of ten children of John Riddell and Lephe Gates. Riddell's father worked as a school teacher, constable, and justice of the peace. Before Riddell's first birthday, the family settled on a farm near the town of Preston, New York. They were very poor and lived in a small log house on their farm. Starting in 1813, Riddell received a sporadic education at the district school for the next five years, attending class for short sessions in the summer and a few weeks each winter. Among his teachers were his aunt and his uncle.

In 1825, he worked as a schoolmaster in Solon, New York, earning $7.00 a month for a three-month term. The following year, he attended Oxford Academy for four months and later enrolled in Rensselaer Polytechnic Institute in Troy, New York. Riddell studied under the notable scientist Amos Eaton and received a B.A. degree in 1829 and an M.A. in 1832.

He received his B.A. and M.A. at Rensselaer Polytechnic Institute from professor Amos Eaton and his M.D. from Cincinnati College in 1836.

Prior to receiving his M.D., Riddell found himself in Marietta, Ohio to study with Dr. Hildreth of Marietta College. As there were not many opportunities for a paid lecturer or a trained botanist he put out 'advertisements in local newspapers' publicizing that he would collect plants for sale. He eventually published, in the Western Republican, one of the first botanical collections made in Ohio by a professional botanist. The specimens were donated to Marietta College and the Hildreth Herbarium. The collection was not adequately preserved and has been destroyed but the lists themselves remain.

He lectured in Ogdensburg, New York, and then in Philadelphia and Cincinnati. From 1836 until his death in 1865, he was Professor of Chemistry at the Medical College of Louisiana (now Tulane University) in New Orleans. While there, he developed the first practical version of a microscope to enable binocular viewing of objects through a single objective lens. In 1850, he also undertook one of the earliest and most extensive American microscopic investigations of cholera.

Riddell published a science fiction story in 1847 "Orrin Lindsey's Plan of Aerial Navigation" giving an account of a fictional student who invented an anti-gravity material and used it to build a craft to fly first high in the sky, then to orbit the Moon and return, and at the end announces his plan to travel to Mars.

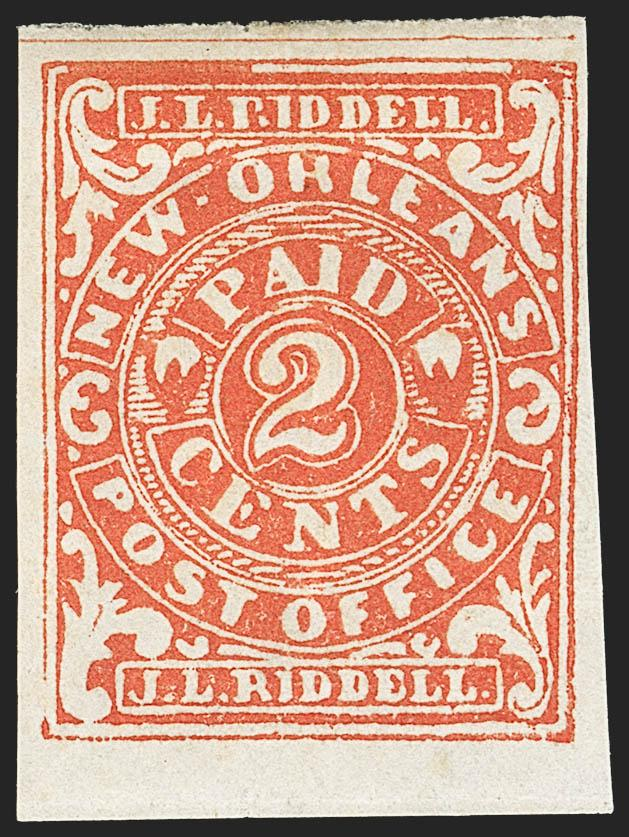
New Orleans postage stamp by Postmaster Riddell

Following his botanical explorations of Texas, he was appointed melter and refiner of the New Orleans Mint, a position confirmed by President John Tyler following an internal mint dispute. He likewise was appointed Postmaster of New Orleans, which position he held even during the Civil War despite Confederate appointments intended to displace him.

In 1863, Riddell attempted to organize an election in Louisiana for governor and representatives to Congress even though Lincoln had denied his petition to do so. On November 2, 1863, an election was held in certain Louisiana parishes and Riddell was reported to have won the governorship. Riddell drafted a document certifying his election and presented himself in Washington to claim his seat. He was refused and was generally ridiculed for his claim.

== Additional sources ==
- Bleiler, Everett F. (2009). "John Leonard Riddell, Pioneer". Science Fiction Studies. 36 (2): 284–299. doi:10.1525/sfs.36.2.0284. ISSN 0091-7729. JSTOR 40649960.
- Cassedy, James H. (1973). "John L. Riddell's "Vibrio biceps": Two Documents on American Microscopy and Cholera Etiology 1849–59". Journal of the History of Medicine and Allied Sciences. 28 (2): 101–108. doi:10.1093/jhmas/XXVIII.2.101. ISSN 0022-5045. JSTOR 24622455. PMID 4572620.
- Duffy, John (2000). Riddell, John Leonard (1807-1865), botanist, microscopist, and geologist. American National Biography Online. Oxford University Press. doi:10.1093/anb/9780198606697.article.1200788.
- Lowden, Richard M. (1997). "Riddell, Sullivant, and the Early Botanical Exploration of Franklin County, Ohio, U.S.A. (1832–1840)". Taxon. 46 (4): 689–703. Bibcode:1997Taxon..46..689L. doi:10.2307/1224475. ISSN 0040-0262. JSTOR 1224475.
- Riess, Karlem (1977). "Special Papers on the History of Science - I: John Leonard Riddell". Tulane Studies in Geology and Paleontology. 13 (1–2).
- Skinner, Hubert C.; Riess, Karlem (1985). "John Leonard Riddell: From Rensselaer to New Orleans (1827–1865)". Earth Sciences History. 4 (1): 75–80. Bibcode:1985ESHis...4...75S. doi:10.17704/eshi.4.1.y136x81m6h4761h9. ISSN 0736-623X. JSTOR 24138446.
