= Ridley College =

Ridley College may refer to

- Ridley College (Melbourne), Victoria, Australia
- Ridley College (Ontario), Canada

== See also ==
- Ridley Hall, Cambridge, Cambridgeshire, England, UK
- Ridley (disambiguation)
