= The Pat McAfee Show =

American sports talk show

- Created by: Pat McAfee
- Presented by: Pat McAfee; A. J. Hawk; Connor "Boston Connor" Campbell; Anthony "Tone Digz" DiGuilio; Ty Schmit; Darius Butler; Kyle "Gump" Cathcart; Evan "Foxy" Fox; Frank "Nick" Maraldo; Zito Perez
- Theme music composer: def rebel (WWE Music Group)
- Opening theme: "The Anomaly" by def rebel (WWE Music Group)
- Country of origin: United States
- Original language: English

Production
- Producer: Ty Schmit
- Production locations: DraftKings Thunderdome, Lawrence, Indiana
- Camera setup: Multi-camera
- Running time: 120–300 minutes
- Production company: Pat McAfee Inc.

Original release
- Network: DAZN (2019–2020); Westwood One radio stations (2019–2020); CBS Sports Radio (2020); YouTube (2020–present); ESPN/ESPN+ (2023–present)
- Release: September 9, 2019 – present

The Pat McAfee Show

YouTube information
- Channel: The Pat McAfee Show
- Years active: 2017–present
- Genre: Sports talk
- Subscribers: 2.9 million
- Views: 2.5 billion
- Last updated: June 10, 2026

The Pat McAfee Show is a daily sports talk show hosted by sports commentator and former National Football League (NFL) punter Pat McAfee. The show broadcasts live from the DraftKings Thunderdome in Lawrence, Indiana. Airing from 12:00 p.m. to roughly 3:00 p.m. ET, the show features a rotation of guests and analysts from varying sports, typically centering around the NFL and college football.

Premiering on September 9, 2019, the program was originally distributed by DAZN and via Westwood One radio. The show currently airs on ESPN, ESPN+, and McAfee's YouTube channel. Only the first two hours air on ESPN; the final hour airs exclusively on ESPN+ and YouTube.

== History ==
=== The Pat McAfee Show podcast (2017–2018) ===
Before hosting the program now known as The Pat McAfee Show, McAfee launched an audio and video podcast of the same name on February 17, 2017, in a partnership with Barstool Sports. Episodes were broadcast live on Facebook and YouTube during this partnership. The original co-hosts of the program were Anthony DiGuilio, Todd McComas, Jason McAfee and Nick Maraldo. The program was known for its "r-rated" form of comedy, which was unusual for high profile sports podcasts at the time. The podcast was eventually broadcast on the SiriusXM station Barstool Power 85 weekdays from 10 a.m. to 1 p.m. until the show ended following McAfee's split with Barstool in 2018.

=== The Pat McAfee Show (2018–present) ===
Following the split with Barstool Sports, Pat McAfee launched a podcast network called Pat McAfee Inc., which included several programs such as The Pat McAfee Show 2.0, That's Hockey Talk, Heartland Radio 2.0, and Good Bettor Bets. The Pat McAfee Show 2.0, also known as "PMS 2.0", was a new podcast that featured the same co-hosts and served as a continuation of the original podcast, but was produced independently at the start. He continued to net high-profile guests such as Aaron Rodgers on the new program, and made his television commentating debut on New Year's Eve of 2018.

The Pat McAfee Show, a new program with the same name as Pat McAfee's prior podcast, premiered on September 9, 2019, as part of a multi-year deal between McAfee, DAZN, and Westwood One. DAZN would distribute the channel via its subscription sports streaming service, while Westwood One would syndicate an audio simulcast, with clearances in 40 markets at launch. The only major format change from the podcast to the radio and television program would be that Pat McAfee would need to use explicit language less frequently in order to comply with FCC regulations. As part of the agreement, McAfee would also produce on-site broadcasts from the locations of boxing and mixed martial arts events being broadcast by DAZN, and also contribute NFL content for DAZN in markets (such as Canada and Germany) where it held streaming rights to the league. It was reported that McAfee was being courted by ESPN as a home for the show (having recently joined ESPN's Get Up! and college football coverage as a contributor), but that DAZN offered him more flexibility.

In January 2020, the radio simulcast moved to the national lineup of CBS Sports Radio. In May 2020, the program's contract with DAZN ended, with its video version moving to YouTube. On September 8, 2020, The Pat McAfee Show moved to SiriusXM's Mad Dog Sports Radio. It also moved from 10 a.m.–12 p.m. ET to a 12–3 p.m. time slot. The show continued to be broadcast live on YouTube. On December 9, 2021, McAfee announced a four-year, $120 million deal with FanDuel, making them the sole odds provider for the Pat McAfee Show. The deal also included the creation of a new studio space in Lawrence, Indiana, known as the "Thunderdome", or the "FanDuel Igloo". In August 2022, the show left SiriusXM after the company did not make an offer for a contract extension. However, the program continued broadcasting on YouTube and as an audio podcast, effectively replacing PMS 2.0 (although the audio version of the program continues to brand the episodes as "PMS 2.0").

On September 7, 2023, The Pat McAfee Show moved to ESPN as part of a deal with the network; it was reported to be valued at $85 million over five years. The new program simulcasts the podcast for the first two hours on ESPN, while ESPN+ streams the entirety of the podcast. The broadcast on ESPN is carried on a slight broadcast delay in order to allow some of its profane language to be censored. It was also announced that the program would occasionally broadcast Friday editions from the site of that week's edition of College GameDay—which McAfee joined as a panelist in 2022.—during college football season. The show had already been involved in altcasts for selected ESPN College Football games with Omaha Productions, including CFB Primetime with The Pat McAfee Show (which aired from his studio during selected Saturday prime time games), and Field Pass with The Pat McAfee Show during the College Football Playoff.

In March 2024, the show similarly traveled to Iowa City for the first round of the 2024 NCAA women's basketball tournament, following the Iowa Hawkeyes and star player Caitlin Clark.

On June 1, 2026, the show announced a multi-year partnership with DraftKings. As part of the deal, the "Thunderdome" was renamed to the "DraftKings Thunderdome".

In 2026, McAfee joined ESPN's Monday Night Countdown as an analyst. As a result, during the NFL season, the show broadcasts Monday episodes from the stadium in which that night's Monday Night Football game will be played.

== Hosts and guests ==
=== Hosts ===
- Pat McAfee
- A. J. Hawk (Note: Hawk appears on the show from his home from 1:00 p.m. until the end of the show. On days that McAfee is out of the studio, Hawk typically hosts the show in its entirety from the studio.)
- Connor "Boston Connor" Campbell
- Anthony "Tone Digz" DiGiulio
- Ty Schmit
- Darius Butler (Note: Butler typically only appears on the show for two or three days per week.)

=== Recurring guests ===
==== NFL ====
- Dan Orlovsky, former NFL quarterback and ESPN NFL analyst
- Chuck Pagano, NFL coach
- Ian Rapoport, NFL Network insider
- Aaron Rodgers, NFL quarterback
- Adam Schefter, ESPN NFL insider
- Peter Schrager, ESPN NFL analyst
- A. Q. Shipley, former NFL center (Note: Shipley joins the show from the studio every Wednesday during the NFL season.)
- J. J. Watt, former NFL defensive end (Note: Watt appears on the show for an hour every Wednesday during the NFL season on a segment known as "Watt Wednesday".)

==== College football ====
- Steve "Stanford Steve" Coughlin, analyst on College GameDay
- Rece Davis, host of College Gameday
- Heather Dinich, college football insider
- Kirk Herbstreit, analyst on College Gameday
- Nick Saban, former head coach and analyst on College GameDay
- Pete Thamel, ESPN college sports reporter

==== NBA ====
- Shams Charania, ESPN NBA insider
- Tyrese Haliburton, NBA guard
- Chris Paul, former NBA guard
- Kendrick Perkins, former NBA center and ESPN NBA analyst
- Quentin Richardson, former NBA guard and forward

==== NHL ====
- Erik Johnson, NHL defenseman
- P. K. Subban, former NHL defenseman and ESPN NHL analyst

==== MLB ====
- Jeff Passan, ESPN MLB insider
- Paul Skenes, MLB pitcher

== Specials ==
- The Pat McAfee Show Draft Spectacular features coverage of the first two days of the NFL draft, complementing ESPN's coverage of the draft. Peter Schrager and Dan Orlovsky join the show to provide pick-by-pick analysis, and Ty Schmit appears as "Mad Mel Kiper", a parody of ESPN draft analyst Mel Kiper Jr.
- Field Pass with The Pat McAfee Show originally began in 2022 as an altcast of ESPN's coverage of select College Football Playoff games. During Field Pass, the hosts broadcast live commentary on the field during the game.
  - In 2026, Field Pass expanded to air for select Monday Night Football games on weeks that the Manningcast, another ESPN altcast for Monday Night Football, does not air. During Field Pass for Monday Night Football, McAfee, Darius Butler, and Dan Orlovsky broadcast from the field, while the other hosts report from another location inside the stadium, and rotating guests appear remotely.
  - A similar Field Pass altcast was broadcast for Game 3 of the 2026 NBA Finals, featuring Kendrick Perkins as an analyst.
- Free Agency Frenzy takes place at the beginning of NFL free agency. Adam Schefter and Peter Schrager join the show to provide live reporting and immediate analysis of signings.

== Controversies ==
=== Brett Favre lawsuit ===
In February 2023, Brett Favre sued Pat McAfee after McAfee called Favre a "thief" who was "stealing from poor people in Mississippi" on the show. McAfee made the comments after Favre was accused of taking money from Mississippi's Temporary Assistance for Needy Families funds to enrich himself. The lawsuit was later withdrawn.

=== Move to ESPN ===
Following the announcement that the show would move to ESPN in 2023, some fans accused McAfee of being a "sellout".

=== Controversies related to appearances by Aaron Rodgers ===
In 2021, the show was criticized by commentators for allowing frequent guest Aaron Rodgers to question the effectiveness of the COVID-19 vaccine and the NFL's COVID-19-related policies.

Rodgers appeared on the January 2, 2024, edition of the show, on which he discussed plans to release the Epstein files. Rodgers stated that "if that list comes out, I will definitely be popping some sort of bottle...a lot of people including Jimmy Kimmel are hoping it doesn't come out." Kimmel denied any connection to Epstein and threatened to sue Rodgers over his accusations. An ESPN spokesperson declined to comment on Rodgers' role in the episode. McAfee, however, issued a public apology to Kimmel the following day, stating that Rodgers was "just trying to talk shit".

=== Mary Kate Cornett controversy ===
The show generated controversy in 2025 after McAfee mentioned a then-viral internet rumor that Mary Kate Cornett, a student at the University of Mississippi, had been sleeping with her boyfriend's father. McAfee later apologized to Cornett's family and issued a public apology on the show.

== Awards ==
On December 19, 2022, the show won Sports Business Journal's inaugural Best Sports Audio award.
