= Ridley =

Ridley may refer to:

== Biology ==
- Ridley turtles, a genus of sea turtle
  - Kemp's ridley sea turtle
  - Olive ridley sea turtle

== Education ==
- Ridley College (Ontario), a university preparatory boarding and day school located in St. Catharines, Ontario, Canada
- Ridley College (Melbourne), an evangelical theological college in Melbourne, Australia
- Ridley Hall, Cambridge, a theological college in the evangelical tradition of the Church of England (named for the martyr bishop Nicholas)
- Ridley School District, in Pennsylvania, United States
- Ridley High School, in Folsom, Pennsylvania, United States

== Entertainment ==
- Ridley (Metroid), a major antagonist from the Metroid video game series
- Ridley Jones, an American animated television series
- Ridley Silverlake, the female protagonist in the PS2 game Radiata Stories
- Ridley (TV series), a 2022 British television crime drama series

== Places ==
- Ridley, Cheshire, England, United Kingdom, a former civil parish
- Ridley, Kent, England, United Kingdom, a place and former civil parish
- Ridley, Northumberland, England, United Kingdom, a hamlet; see List of United Kingdom locations: Ri-Ror § Ri
- Ridley Township, Pennsylvania, United States

== Other ==
- Ridley (name), a surname and given name, with a list of people of this name
- Ridley Bikes, a Belgian bicycle brand
- Ridley Inc., a manufacturer and marketer of livestock products
- Viscount Ridley, a title in the UK Peerage created in 1900 for Matthew Ridley, 1st Viscount Ridley

== See also ==
- Ridley's (disambiguation)
- Ridleyi
