= Ridley's =

Ridley's may refer to:

- Ridley's Brewery
- Ridley's Family Markets

== See also ==
- Ridley (disambiguation)
