= Shipley (surname) =

Oliver Shipley's Descendant

Shipley is an English surname. Notable people with the surname include:

- A. Q. Shipley (Allan Quay Shipley) (born 1986), American football lineman
- Ann Shipley (1899–1981), Canadian politician
- Arthur Shipley (1861–1927), British zoologist, Vice-Chancellor of the University of Cambridge
- Braden Shipley (born 1992), American baseball player
- Burton Shipley (1890–1976), first Maryland Terrapins men's basketball coach
- Debra Shipley (born 1957), British politician
- Don Shipley (stage director), Canadian stage director
- Don Shipley (Navy SEAL), American Navy SEAL
- Heather Shipley, American environmental engineer and academic administrator
- Jenny Shipley (born 1952), Prime Minister of New Zealand from 1997 to 1999
- John Shipley (poker player) (born 1960), English poker player
- John Shipley, Baron Shipley (born 1946), Liberal Democrat peer in the House of Lords
- Jonathan Shipley (1714–1788), English bishop
- Jordan Shipley (born 1985), American football wide receiver
- Joseph Twadell Shipley (1893–1981), American drama critic, author, editor and professor
- Mason Shipley (born 2002), American football placekicker
- Mike Shipley (1956–2013), Australian record producer and mixer
- Rebecca Shipley, British mathematician, Professor of Healthcare Engineering at University College London
- Reece Shipley (1921–1998), American country musician
- Ruth Shipley (1885–1966), head of the Passport Division of the U.S. State Department
- Tom Shipley, musician in the 1970s folk-rock duo Brewer & Shipley
- Tony Shipley (born 1953), former State Representative in Tennessee
- Walter V. Shipley (1935–2019), American banker
- Wil Shipley (born 1969), software developer
- Will Shipley (born 2002), American football player
- William Shipley (1715–1803), English drawing master, social reformer and inventor, who founded what became the Royal Society of Arts
