= Henry J. Ripley =

American Baptist clergyman and biblical scholar

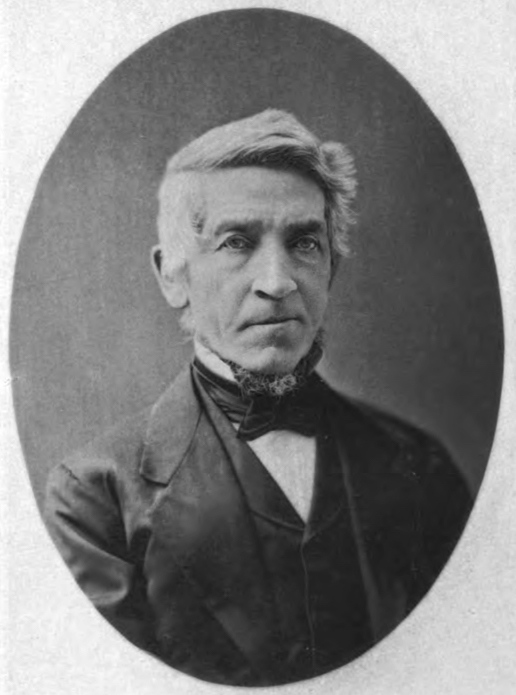
Henry J. Ripley

Rev. Henry J. Ripley (January 28, 1798 – May 21, 1875) was an American Baptist clergyman and biblical scholar.

== Biography ==
Henry J. Ripley was born on January 28, 1798, in Boston, Massachusetts. He graduated from Harvard University in 1816, after having first graduated from the Boston Latin School. In 1819, he graduated from Andover Theological Seminary to prepare for the ministry. He was ordained this same year at Baldwin Place Church in Boston.

During much of the 1820s, Rev. Ripley was in Georgia evangelizing predominately African-Americans. However, in 1826 the Newton Theological Institution, which had been open for only a year, named Rev. Ripley as chair of Biblical Literature and Pastoral Duties. This he held until 1832, when he devoted his time to biblical interpretation. In 1839, he became chair of Sacred Rhetoric and Pastoral Duties, which he held until 1857. After this, he taught biblical literature and interpretation until his retirement in 1860.

Rev. Ripley continued to write on biblical topics during retirement. In 1866, bored with retirement, he returned to the Institution as a librarian. He died in Newton, Massachusetts, on May 21, 1875.

== Works ==
- Memoir of Thomas Sumner Winn, late Pastor of the Newport Baptist Church, Ga : who died January 27, 1819, in the twenty-seventh year of his age (Philadelphia: Baptist General Tract Society, 1819).
- Christian Baptism: An Examination of Professor Stuart's Essay in the Biblical Repository, April, 1833, on "The Mode of Baptism" (Boston: Lincoln, Edmonds & Co, 1833).
- The Acts of the Apostles: With Notes, Chiefly Explanatory; Designed for Teachers in Sabbath Schools and Bible Classes, and as an Aid to Family Instruction (Boston: Gould, Kendall, and Lincoln, 1843)
- The Four Gospels: With Notes, Chiefly Explanatory; Designed for Teachers in Sabbath Schools and Bible Classes, and as an Aid to Family Instruction (Boston: Gould, Kendall, and Lincoln, 1844).
- Sacred Rhetoric: Or, Composition and Delivery of Sermons(Boston: Gould, Kendall and Lincoln, 1849)
- Exclusiveness of the Baptists: A Review of the Rev. Albert Barnes's Pamphlet on 'Exclusivism' (Boston: Gould and Lincoln, 1857).
- The Epistle of the Apostle Paul to the Romans: With Notes, Chiefly Explanatory. Designed as an Accompaniment to the Author's Notes on the Gospels and the Acts (Boston: Gould and Lincoln, 1859).
- Church Polity: A Treatise on Christian Churches and the Christian Ministry (Boston: Graves & Young, 1867).
- The Epistle to the Hebrews, with Explanatory Notes: To which are Added a Condensed View of the Priesthood of Christ, and a Translation of the Epistle, Prepared for this Work (Boston: Gould and Lincoln, 1868)
