= Shipley, New South Wales =

Coordinates: 33°39′54″S 150°15′32″E

Shipley is a small hamlet village in the state of New South Wales, Australia, in the City of Blue Mountains. It is an unbounded locality within the locality of Blackheath, south-west of the township of Blackheath. The Shipley Plateau, on which the village is built, divides the Megalong Valley and Kanimbla Valley.
