= Shipley & Halmos =

- Company type: Private
- Industry: Fashion
- Founded: 2007
- Headquarters: New York, New York
- Owner: Sam Shipley, Jeff Halmos
- Website: http://www.shipley-halmos.com/

Shipley & Halmos is a men's design firm based in New York City which debuted in the Spring of 2008. Shipley & Halmos is designed by Sam Shipley and Jeff Halmos, two of the original founders of Trovata. Shipley & Halmos were winners of the inaugural National Arts Club "Young Designer Award" in 2008, named finalists for the GQ/CFDA "Best New Designer Award" in 2009, and were finalists for the Fashion Group International "Rising Star Award" in 2010. In 2009, Shipley & Halmos partnered with Uniqlo, through their Designer Invitation Project. GQ describes their look as "Laid back but not at all disheveled." Sam Shipley and Jeff Halmos are members of the Council of Fashion Designers of America.
