= Ridley Plaisted =

Australian rules footballer

Personal information
- Full name: Ridley Wilks Plaisted
- Born: 18 December 1885; St Kilda, Victoria
- Died: 2 July 1954 (aged 68); Balwyn, Victoria
- Height: 169 cm (5 ft 7 in)

Playing career^{1}
Years	Club	Games (Goals)
1905–1907	Fitzroy	5 (8)
- ^{1} Playing statistics correct to the end of 1907.

Ridley Wilks Plaisted (18 December 1885 – 2 July 1954) was an Australian rules footballer. He played five games for Fitzroy in the Victorian Football League (VFL) between 1905 and 1907 and kicked eight goals. His debut match was the 1905 Round 15 clash with St Kilda at Brunswick Street.
