= Eliza McHatton Ripley =

American civil war era author (1832–1912)

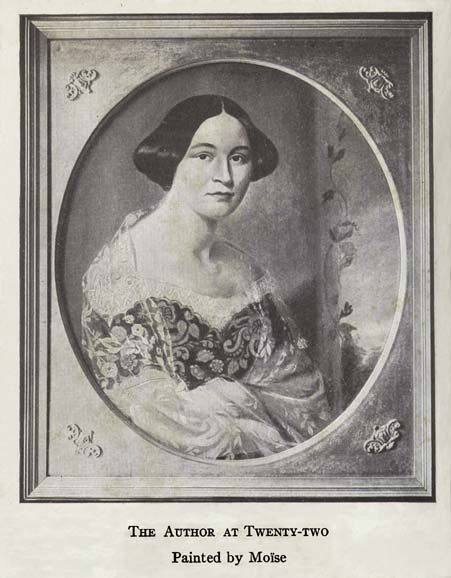
Frontispiece of her book with an image of her by Theodore Sydney Moïse

Eliza McHatton Ripley (1832–1912), born Elizabeth Chinn, was an American writer who wrote about her experiences on a Louisiana plantation at the onset of the American Civil War when her family fled to New Orleans, Texas, Mexico, and Cuba She also wrote the book Social Life in Old New Orleans.

She married her first husband and became Elizabeth McHatton before being widowed in 1865 and remarrying to Colonel Dwight Ripley in 1873.

Some of the correspondence of her family still exists including the description of a rebellion of Chinese laborers on her family's plantation in protest at the inadequacy of their rations.
