= Ridley Burton =

English footballer

Personal information
- Date of birth: 21 December 1893
- Place of birth: Amble, England
- Date of death: 28 October 1974 (aged 80)
- Position: Wing half

Senior career*
Years	Team	Apps	(Gls)
1911–1912	Gateshead Rodsley		
1912–1913	Seaton Delaval		
1913–1914	Windy Nook		
1914–1918	Newcastle City		
1918–1919	Close Works		
1919–1920	Grimsby Town	13	(0)
1920–1921	West Stanley		
1921–1924	Ashington	29	(1)
1924–1925	Chester-le-Street		
1925–192?	Preston Colliery		
- * Club domestic league appearances and goals

Ridley Burton (21 December 1893 – 28 October 1974) was an English professional footballer who played as a wing half.
