= A. Q. Shipley =

American football player and coach (born 1986)

A.Q. Shipley
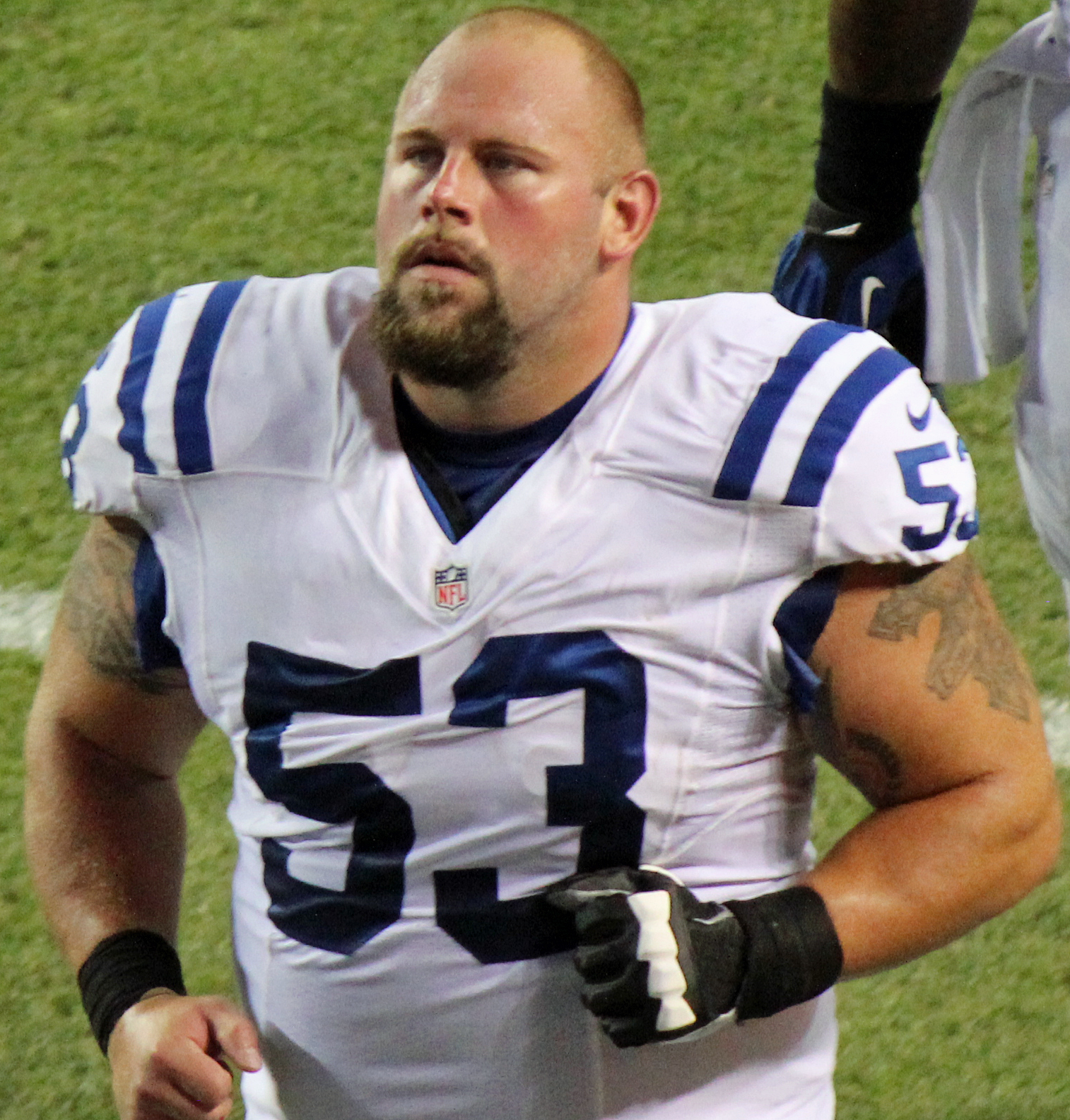
- Shipley with the Colts in 2014

No. 62, 68, 53
- Position: Center

Personal information
- Born: May 22, 1986 (age 40); Coraopolis, Pennsylvania, U.S.
- Listed height: 6 ft 1 in (1.85 m)
- Listed weight: 307 lb (139 kg)

Career information
- High school: Moon Area (Moon Township, Pennsylvania)
- College: Penn State (2005–2008)
- NFL draft: 2009: 7th round, 226th overall pick

Career history

Playing
- Pittsburgh Steelers (2009)*; Philadelphia Eagles (2010–2011)*; Indianapolis Colts (2012); Baltimore Ravens (2013); Indianapolis Colts (2014); Arizona Cardinals (2015–2019); Tampa Bay Buccaneers (2020)
- * Offseason or practice squad member only

Coaching
- Tampa Bay Buccaneers (2021) Offensive assistant

Awards and highlights
- Super Bowl champion (LV); Rimington Trophy (2008); First-team All-American (2008); Big Ten Offensive Lineman of the Year (2008); 2× First-team All-Big Ten (2007, 2008)

Career NFL statistics
- Games played: 110
- Games started: 72
- Stats at Pro Football Reference

Allan Quay Shipley (born May 22, 1986) is an American former professional football player who was a center for 12 seasons in the National Football League (NFL). He played college football for the Penn State Nittany Lions and was selected by the Pittsburgh Steelers in the seventh round of the 2009 NFL draft. Shipley was also a member of the Philadelphia Eagles, Indianapolis Colts, Baltimore Ravens, Arizona Cardinals, and Tampa Bay Buccaneers. He spent the 2021 season as an offensive assistant for the Buccaneers, before making regular appearances on The Pat McAfee Show.

== Early life ==
Shipley attended Moon Area High School in Moon Township, Pennsylvania. As a team captain, he helped the football team reach the 2003 WPIAL Class AAA semifinals. He was a named to the Pittsburgh Post-Gazette Fabulous 22, the Pittsburgh Tribune-Review Terrific 25, and the Harrisburg Patriot-News Platinum 33 lists and played in the 2004 Big 33 Football Classic. He also was a three-year starter in basketball, helping to lead the team to win the 2003–2004 PIAA state championship. He wrestled one year in high school at heavyweight, pinning the defending division IV state champion in his first match.

Regarded as four-star recruit by Rivals.com, Shipley was listed as the No. 12 defensive tackle prospect in the class of 2004.

== College career ==
During his career at Penn State, Shipley switched positions on the offensive and defensive lines, several times. Shipley's redshirt freshman season at Penn State began with him playing on the offensive line and ended with him playing defense. At the beginning of the 2006 season Shipley was switched back to the offensive line and he spent the season as the starting center and anchored the offensive line for Tony Hunt's record-setting senior season. Shipley is known for his engaging personality and has served as the team Santa Claus for the Nittany Lions' annual Christmas party. He is known as a team leader who has sought out leadership positions.

I just love being a leader, love being the center, knowing that the play starts with me and being able to control the offensive line, when I played high school basketball, I loved having the ball in my hands for the last shot. I like to be able to try to raise other people's play.

Shipley began the 2008 season on the Lombardi, Outland, and Rimington Trophy watchlists. By October, he had earned mid-season All-American honors from Sports Illustrated, College Football News, CBS Sports, and Phil Steele. At season's end, he was awarded the Rimington Trophy, awarded annually to the best center in college football. He was also named an All-American, a consensus first-team All-Big Ten selection, and the conference's Offensive Lineman of the Year. Shipley earned a Bachelor of Science in labor studies from Penn State in 2008.

Shipley was a 2008 team captain for the Nittany Lions. He was the recipient of the 2008 Dave Rimington Trophy.

== Professional career ==
=== Pre-draft ===
Pre-draft measurables
Height	Weight	Arm length	Hand span	40-yard dash	10-yard split	20-yard split	20-yard shuttle	Three-cone drill	Vertical jump	Broad jump	Bench press	Wonderlic
6 ft 1 1/8 in (1.86 m)	304 lb (138 kg)	29 3/4 in (0.76 m)	8 1/2 in (0.22 m)	5.26 s	1.85 s	3.06 s	4.40 s	7.46 s	31 in (0.79 m)	8 ft 4 in (2.54 m)	33 reps	40
All values from NFL Combine

Shipley was invited to the 2009 NFL Scouting Combine where he bench pressed 33 reps of 225 lbs. (fifth among offensive linemen at the combine) and measured a 31-inch vertical jump (eighth among offensive linemen at the combine). He ran 7.46 in the 3 cone drill and 4.40 in the 20-yard shuttle (second and fifth, respectively, among offensive linemen at the combine). Shipley also scored a 40 on the Wonderlic Test—double the average score for NFL draft prospects.

=== Pittsburgh Steelers ===
The Pittsburgh Steelers selected Shipley in the seventh round with the 226th overall pick the 2009 NFL draft. He was the last of seven centers selected during the draft. On June 18, 2009, he signed a three-year, $1.22 million contract. He was waived on September 4, 2009, and was signed to the practice squad on September 6.

=== Philadelphia Eagles ===
On January 11, 2010, the Philadelphia Eagles signed him to a three-year contract. He was waived on September 4, 2010, and re-signed to the team's practice squad on September 5, 2010. He spent the entire season on the practice squad, and was re-signed to a future contract on January 10, 2011. He was waived during final cuts on September 2, 2011.

=== Indianapolis Colts (first stint) ===
On January 29, 2012, the Indianapolis Colts signed Shipley, reuniting him with offensive coordinator Bruce Arians. Shipley competed with Samson Satele in training camp and was ultimately named the backup center to begin the season. He made his professional debut in the Colts' season-opening 21–41 loss at the Chicago Bears.

On October 7, 2012, Shipley made his first career start in place of an injured Satele. He finished the regular season with five starts and played in 14 games.

=== Baltimore Ravens ===
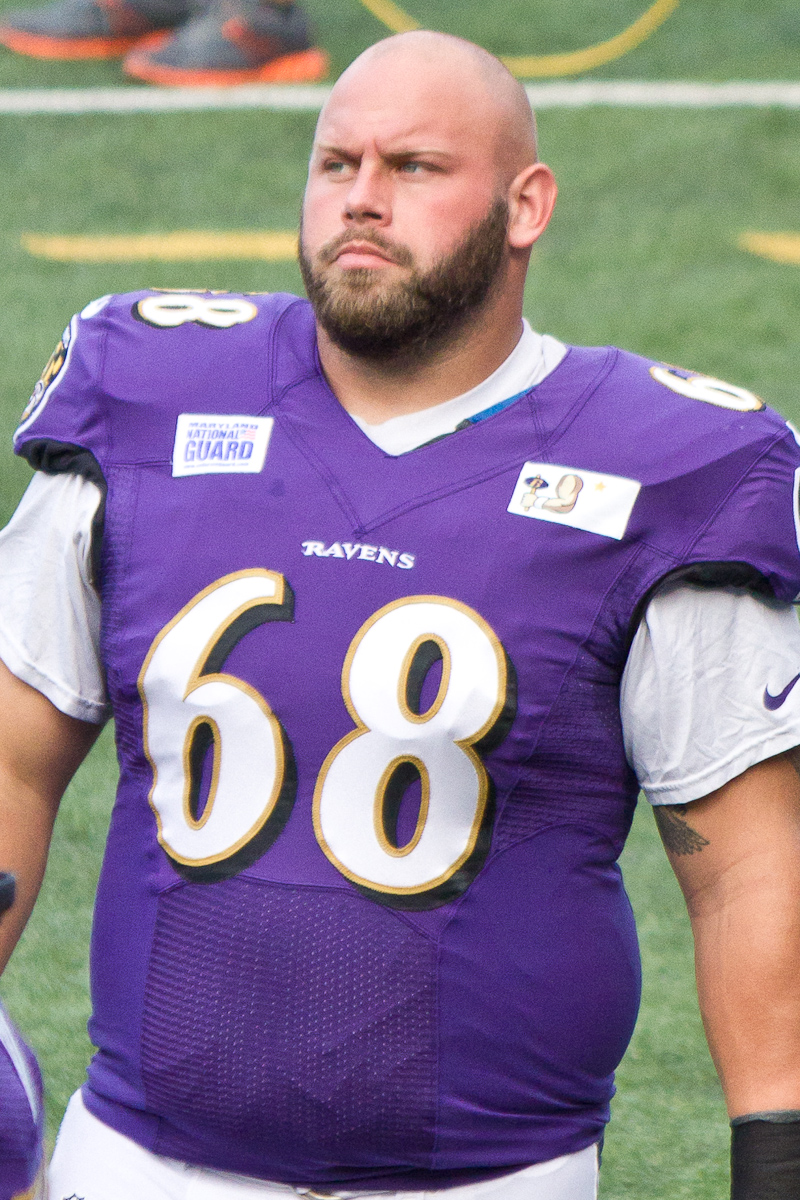
Shipley with the Ravens in 2013

On May 9, 2013, the Colts traded Shipley to the Baltimore Ravens for a 2014 conditional seventh-round draft pick.

He entered training camp competing with Gino Gradkowski for the vacant starting center position left by the retirement of Matt Birk. Shipley was named the backup to Gradkowski to begin the regular season. On November 3, 2013, Shipley made his first start of the season, in place of Gradkowski, during an 18–24 loss to the Cleveland Browns. He started the last nine games of the regular season, while appearing in all 16.

On August 30, 2014, Shipley was waived by the Ravens.

=== Indianapolis Colts (second stint) ===
On August 31, 2014, the Colts claimed Shipley off of waivers after starting center Khaled Holmes suffered an injury during the first snap of the preseason.

He was immediately inserted into a competition for the starting center position against undrafted rookie Jonotthan Harrison. Shipley was named the starting center for the season opener against the Denver Broncos. After starting and playing well in the first four games, he was surprisingly demoted to the backup position behind Harrison. He finished the 2014 season playing in 15 games, started five, and was ranked as the 13th highest graded center in the NFL by Pro Football Focus.

=== Arizona Cardinals ===
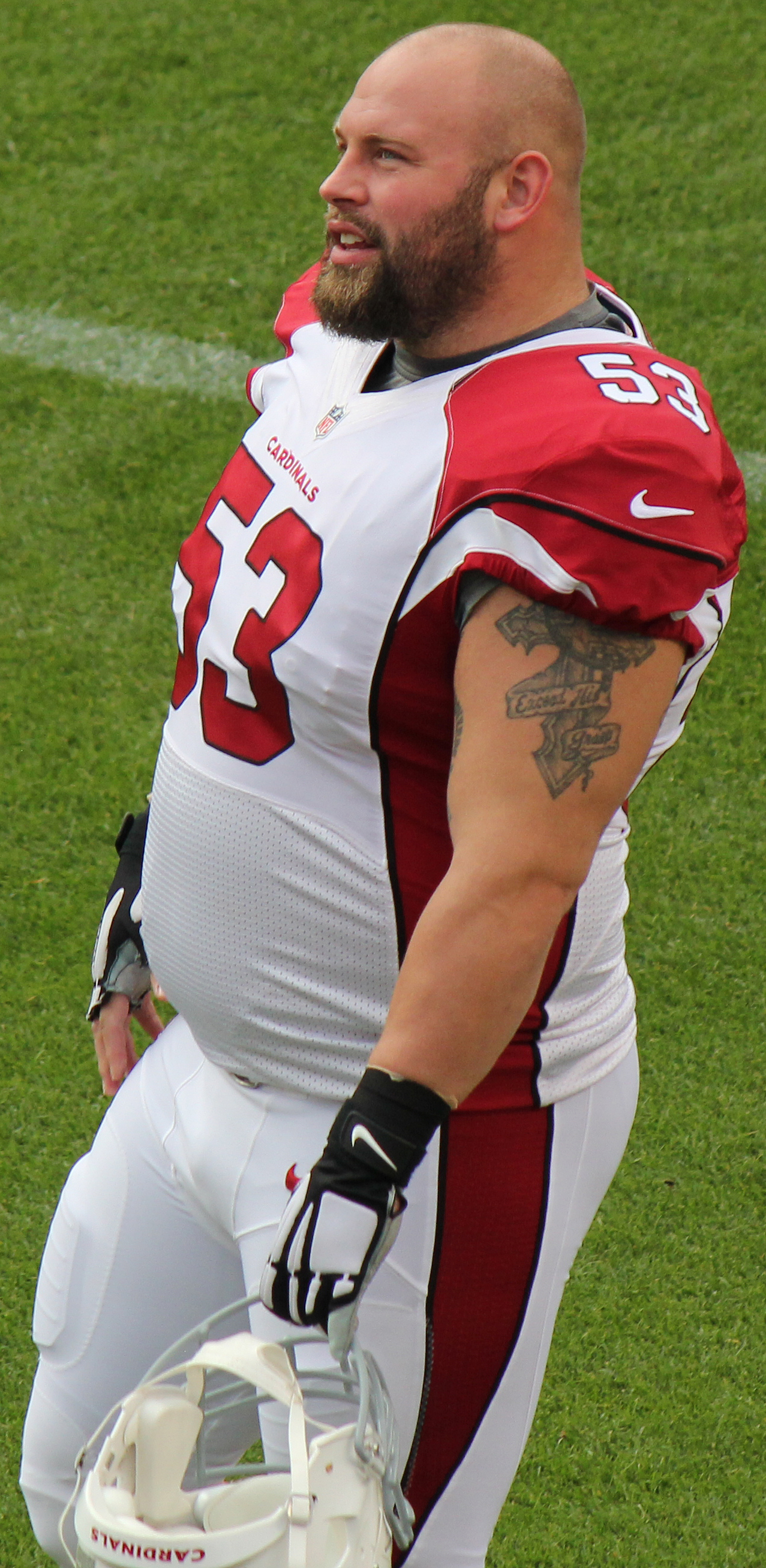
Shipley with the Cardinals in 2015

On March 11, 2015, the Arizona Cardinals signed Shipley to a two-year, $1.57 million contract that includes $300,000 guaranteed and a $100,000 signing bonus. This reunited him with head coach Bruce Arians for the third time on their third different team.

Shipley entered training camp competing to be the Cardinals' starting center, but was named the backup to Ted Larsen. He made his Cardinals debut in their 31–19 season-opening victory over the New Orleans Saints. On October 26, 2015, he made his first start at center for the Cardinals in a 26–18 victory over the Baltimore Ravens. In his first season with the Arizona Cardinals, he appeared in 12 games and started three.

The following season, Shipley entered training camp competing with rookie Evan Boehm and veteran Taylor Boggs after Larsen departed for the Chicago Bears in free agency. The Cardinals named him their starting center to open the season. He started all 16 regular season games, as the Cardinals finished with a 7–8–1 record.

On March 9, 2017, the Cardinals signed Shipley to a two-year, $3.5 million contract extension, that included a $725,000 signing bonus. He was the only offensive lineman for the Cardinals to start all 16 games for the second season in a row.

On August 6, 2018, Shipley tore his ACL in training camp and was ruled out for the season. On August 24, 2018, he signed a one-year contract extension with the Cardinals through the 2019 season.

In 2019, Shipley started all 16 games at center for the Cardinals.

=== Tampa Bay Buccaneers ===
On August 27, 2020, Shipley signed with the Tampa Bay Buccaneers, marking the fourth time he would play under Bruce Arians for the fourth different team. He was released during final roster cuts on September 5, but re-signed with the team three days later. Shipley would go on to start two games for the Buccaneers before suffering a neck injury. On November 26, head coach Bruce Arians announced that Shipley may have a career-ending neck injury, and he was placed on injured reserve two days later.

Ultimately, it was revealed that Shipley had suffered from what he described as a "bruised spinal cord", and at age 34 opted to retire rather than undergo surgery. Despite this, Shipley would get a Super Bowl ring for his earlier contributions after the Buccaneers defeated the Kansas City Chiefs in Super Bowl LV, 31–9.

== NFL career statistics ==
Year	Team	Games	Starts
2012	IND	14	5
2013	BAL	16	9
2014	IND	15	5
2015	ARI	12	3
2016	ARI	16	16
2017	ARI	16	16
2019	ARI	16	16
2020	TB	5	2
Career		110	75

== Post-playing career ==
Following his retirement, Shipley was named an offensive assistant on the Tampa Bay Buccaneers' coaching staff on May 5, 2021. He left the coaching staff to spend more time with his children. In 2023, during the off-season, he began training Buccaneers center Robert Hainsey, as well as Minnesota's John Michael Schmitz.

Shipley has mostly been associated with Pat McAfee, his former teammate with the Indianapolis Colts. In addition to his appearances on The Pat McAfee Show, he had co-hosted "That's Hockey Talk", before being replaced by NHL player Mike Rupp. In 2022, he began hosting a new in-studio segment called "In the Trenches" on Wednesdays, which has continued after the show's move to ESPN.

In 2025, Shipley was hired by the Arizona Cardinals as radio color analyst, replacing the retiring Ron Wolfley.

== Personal life ==
Shipley married his college girlfriend in 2014, but they had split within a year. He later remarried and has three children with his second wife.
