= Theodore Sydney Moïse =

- Born: November 10, 1808; Charleston, South Carolina
- Died: July 2, 1885 (aged 76); Natchitoches, Louisiana
- Known for: paintings, portraits
- Style: neoclassical
- Relatives: Penina Moïse (aunt); Edwin Warren Moïse (brother)

Theodore Sydney Moïse (November 10, 1808 – July 2, 1885) was a painter in the United States known for his paintings of people and horses. He was one of the first painters of horses in the South. His painting style has been described as neo-classical.

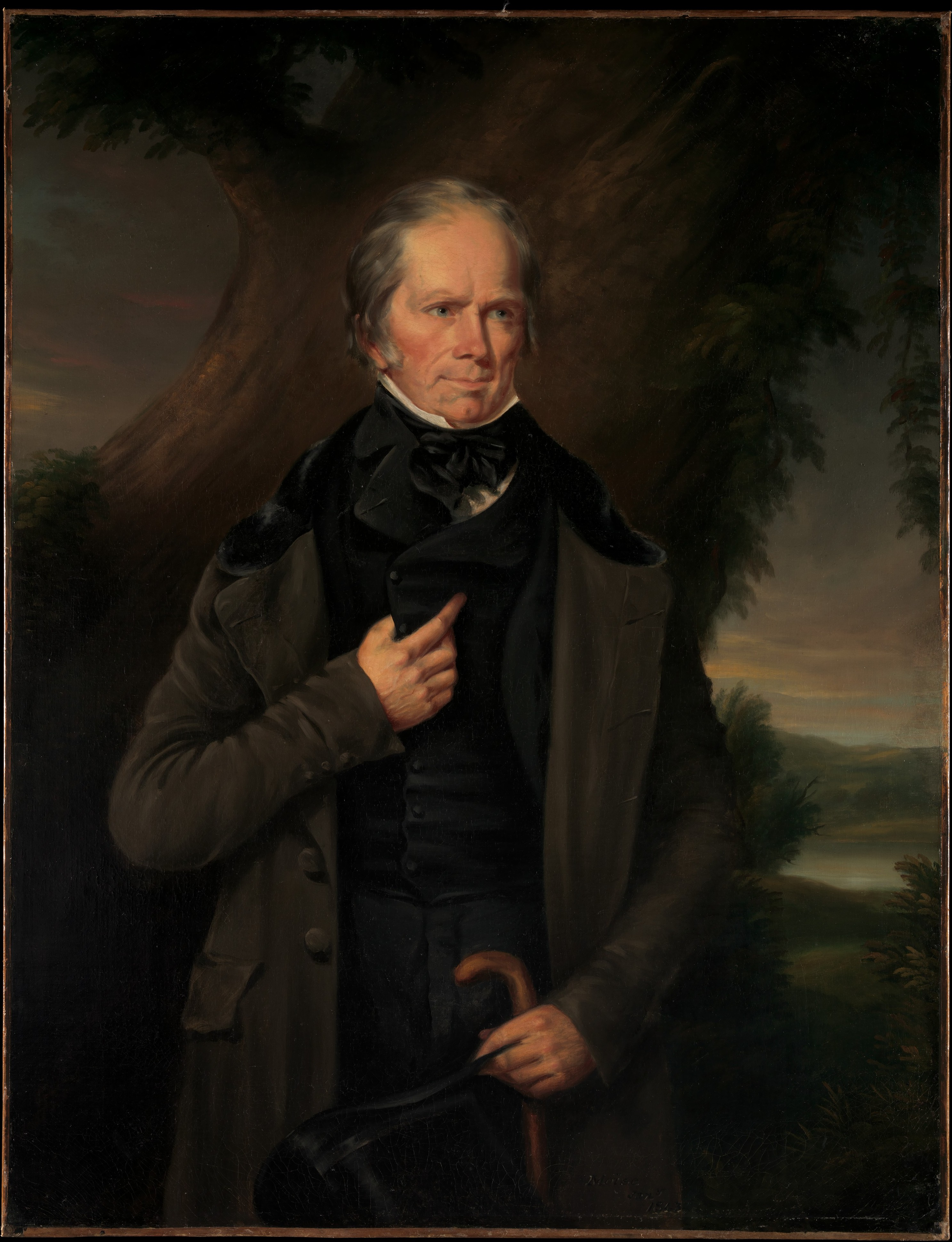
Portrait of Henry Clay (1843) by Theodore Sidney Moise, oil on canvas

Moise was born and raised in Charleston, South Carolina. In 1836, he moved to Mississippi, then to New Orleans, Louisiana in 1842, where he lived until his death. He established a successful portrait studio in New Orleans. Artists who were members of his studio included: Benjamin Franklin Reinhart and Paul Poincy. He would travel throughout the South, painting prominent and wealthy Southern families, sometimes accompanied by their dogs, horses, and servants.

Some of his best-known portraits are of:

- Senator Henry Clay, commissioned by John Freeland
- General Andrew Jackson on horseback

Other notable pieces include:

- Edwin Warren Moïse, Theodore Moise's brother.
- Eliza McHatton Ripley, used on the frontispice of her book, Social Life in Old New Orleans.

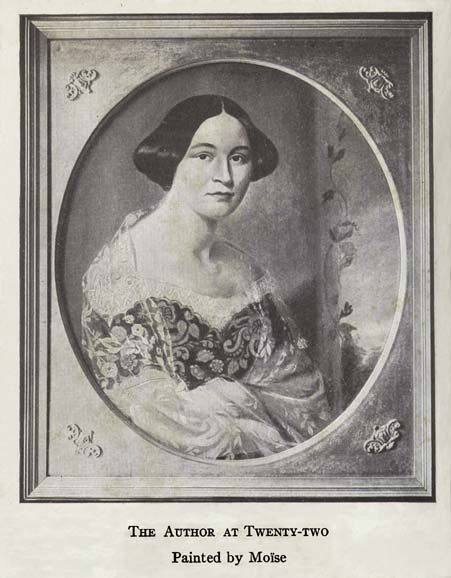
Eliza Moore Chinn McHatton Ripley, frontispiece to her 1912 book

Many of the portraits of 19th century judges in the Orleans Parish Courthouse in New Orleans were painted by Moises. He also has pieces in the Metropolitan Museum of Art, in the Smithsonian American Art Museum's collection, in the Filson Historical Society, and the Louisiana State Museum.

== The Henry Clay portrait at the Metropolitan Museum of Fine Art ==
The portrait of Senator Henry Clay that is in the Metropolitan Museum of Art's collection has an interesting story. It was commissioned by John Freeland and painted from life in New Orleans in 1843. For many years, it hung in the Lexington, Kentucky home of Freeland's son-in-law, John Redmond Coxe Lewis. It was sold by the family sometime between 1895 and 1897.

The Clay portrait was donated to the Metropolitan Museum of Art in 1909 by Miss Grace H. Dodge, and attributed to the painter Samuel Morse. Given the donor's attribution, the museum labeled the portrait as being "painted by Samuel F. B. Morse." The signature on the painting appeared to read "Morse, Jany. 1843". In 1925, it was recognized someone who has seen it before it had been at the Met, who informed the Met of the misattibution. The painting's signature was re-examined and clearly read "Moïse, Jany, 1843". In September 1925, the museum published a mea culpa in its then-monthly Bulletin.
