= College Football All-Star Challenge =

The College Football All-Star Challenge is a made-for-television competition that is shown on ESPN. The event, produced by Chicago-based Intersport, features senior-class college football players competing in a number of skills contests, including throwing for distance, throwing for accuracy, shuttle runs, and powerlifting.

The Challenge was televised by Fox from its beginning in 1999 until 2005. ESPN began its telecasts in 2006. During the years Fox showed the Challenge, it was held at the same site as that year's Super Bowl. The ESPN events have been televised from the Miami Orange Bowl in Miami, Florida (coincidentally, the home area of Super Bowl XLI, although at a different location, Dolphin Stadium). In 2009 however, when Super Bowl XLIII was held at Raymond James Stadium in Tampa, Florida, the event was televised from Pepin/Rood Stadium at the University of Tampa.

== See also ==
- List of programs broadcast by ESPN
