= WFGA =

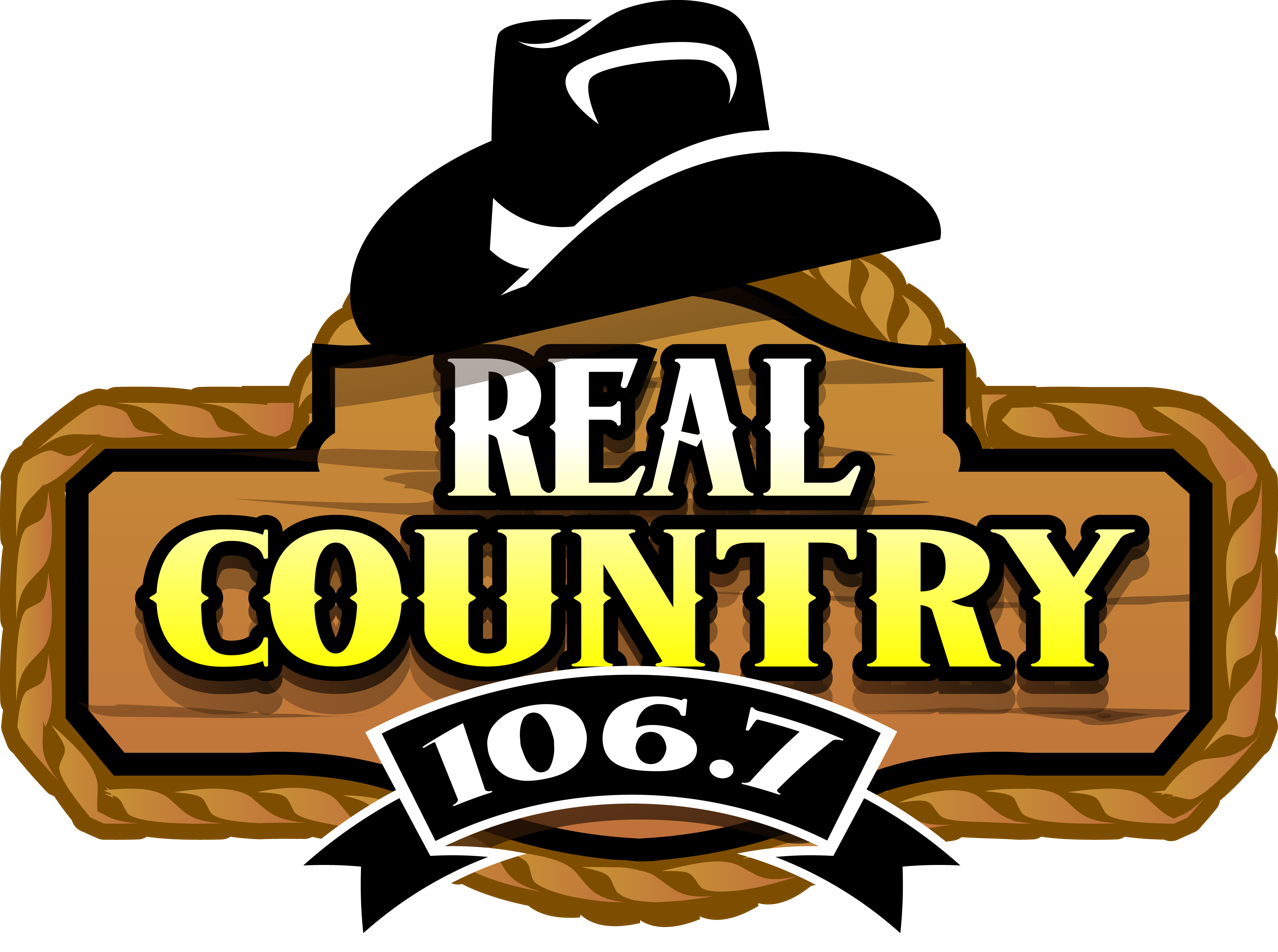
- Hicksville, Ohio; United States
- Broadcast area: Auburn/Garrett, Indiana
- Frequency: 106.7 MHz
- Branding: Real Country 106.7

Programming
- Format: Classic country
- Affiliations: Fox News Radio

Ownership
- Owner: Steve Swick; (Swick Broadcasting Company, Inc.)
- Sister stations: WLKI, WLZZ, WTHD, WBET, WBET-FM

History
- First air date: January 25, 2002 (as WFJZ)
- Former call signs: WFJZ (2000–2005)
- Call sign meaning: W FroGgy Garrett/Auburn (former branding)

Technical information
- Licensing authority: FCC
- Facility ID: 85520
- Class: A
- ERP: 2,800 watts
- HAAT: 150 meters (490 ft)

Links
- Public license information: Public file; LMS
- Webcast: Listen Live
- Website: realcountry1067.com

WFGA (106.7 FM, "Real Country 106.7") is a commercial radio station licensed to Hicksville, Ohio. Owned by Swick Broadcasting Company, Inc., it broadcasts a classic country format. Its studios are located in Auburn, Indiana, and its transmitter is in Butler, Indiana.

== History ==
The station began broadcasting on January 25, 2002, as WFJZ, with a satellite-fed smooth jazz format targeting the Fort Wayne market. Due to its poor signal in Fort Wayne proper, WFJZ was never very successful there, and on May 27, 2005, the station debuted an adult hits format and new call sign as WFGA, Froggy 106.7.

Construction of a new 490 feet (150 m) tower was completed in Butler, Indiana in January 2010. The station subsequently moved its transmitter to the new facility on January 14, 2010, although it remains formally licensed to Hicksville.

In 2012, WFGA flipped to sports radio as a simulcast of WKJG's ESPN Radio programming.

In February 2018, Federated Media sold WFGA to Swick Broadcasting Company for $300,000. On May 22, 2018, after the completion of the sale, WFGA began stunting with barnyard sounds and snippets of country songs; the station officially flipped to classic country Real Country 106.7 on May 25.
