= WBET =

WBET may refer to:

- WBET (AM), a radio station (1230 AM) licensed to Sturgis, Michigan, United States
- WBET-FM, a radio station (99.3 FM) licensed to Sturgis, Michigan, United States
