= WTRC =

WTRC may refer to:

- WTRC (AM) 1340 AM, licensed to Elkhart, Indiana
- WTRC-FM 95.3 FM, licensed to Niles, Michigan
- WFED 1500 AM, licensed to Washington, D.C., which held the WTRC call letters from 1926 until 1927
