= WMSH =

WMSH may refer to:

- WMSH (FM), a radio station (90.3 FM) licensed to serve Sparta, Illinois, United States
- WBET (AM), a radio station (1230 AM) licensed to serve Sturgis, Michigan, United States, which held the call sign WMSH from 1989 to 2009
- WBET-FM, a radio station (99.3 FM) licensed to serve Sturgis, which held the call sign WMSH-FM from 1989 to 2009
