= WLIB =

Bilingual adult contemporary radio station in New York City

Simulcasting WEPN-FM New York City
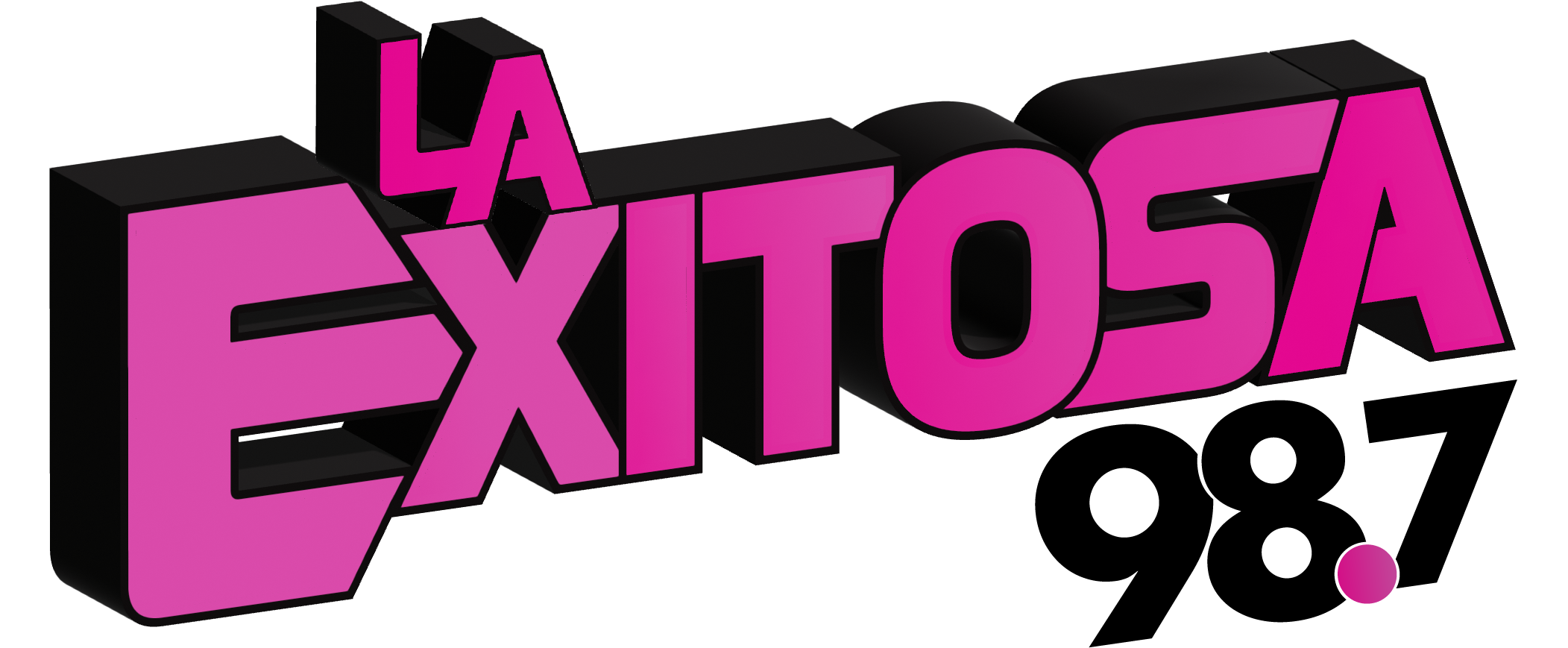
- New York, New York; United States
- Broadcast area: New York metropolitan area
- Frequency: 1190 kHz
- Branding: La Exitosa 98.7

Programming
- Language: Spanglish
- Format: latin pop; adult contemporary music

Ownership
- Owner: Emmis Corporation; (WBLS-WLIB License LLC)
- Sister stations: WEPN-FM

History
- First air date: 1926
- Former call signs: WBKN (1926–1928); WCLB (1928–1930); WMIL (1930–1933); WCNW (1933–1942)
- Call sign meaning: The Voice of Liberty (early slogan)

Technical information
- Licensing authority: FCC
- Facility ID: 28204
- Class: B
- Power: 10,000 watts (day); 30,000 watts (night)
- Transmitter coordinates: 40°47′48.36″N 74°6′4.51″W

Links
- Public license information: Public file; LMS
- Website: www.laexitosa987.com

WLIB (1190 kHz, "La Exitosa 98.7 y 1190 AM") is a commercial AM radio station in New York City. Owned by Emmis Corporation, it is an AM simulcast of sister FM station WEPN-FM 98.7.

By day, WLIB is powered at 10,000 watts, using a directional antenna with a three-tower array. It switches to a four-tower array at sunset. Unusual for most AM stations, it increases its power at night to 30,000 watts. The station's transmitter is on Valley Brook Avenue in Lyndhurst, New Jersey.

== History ==
=== Early years ===
WLIB's origins reach back to 1926. The station's call sign was originally WBKN. It went on the air in Brooklyn, at the time considered a different city of license than New York by the Federal Radio Commission. In 1928, the call sign was changed to WCLB, reflecting its new location in the City of Long Beach. In 1930, the new call sign of WMIL was adopted, and was changed to WCNW in 1933.

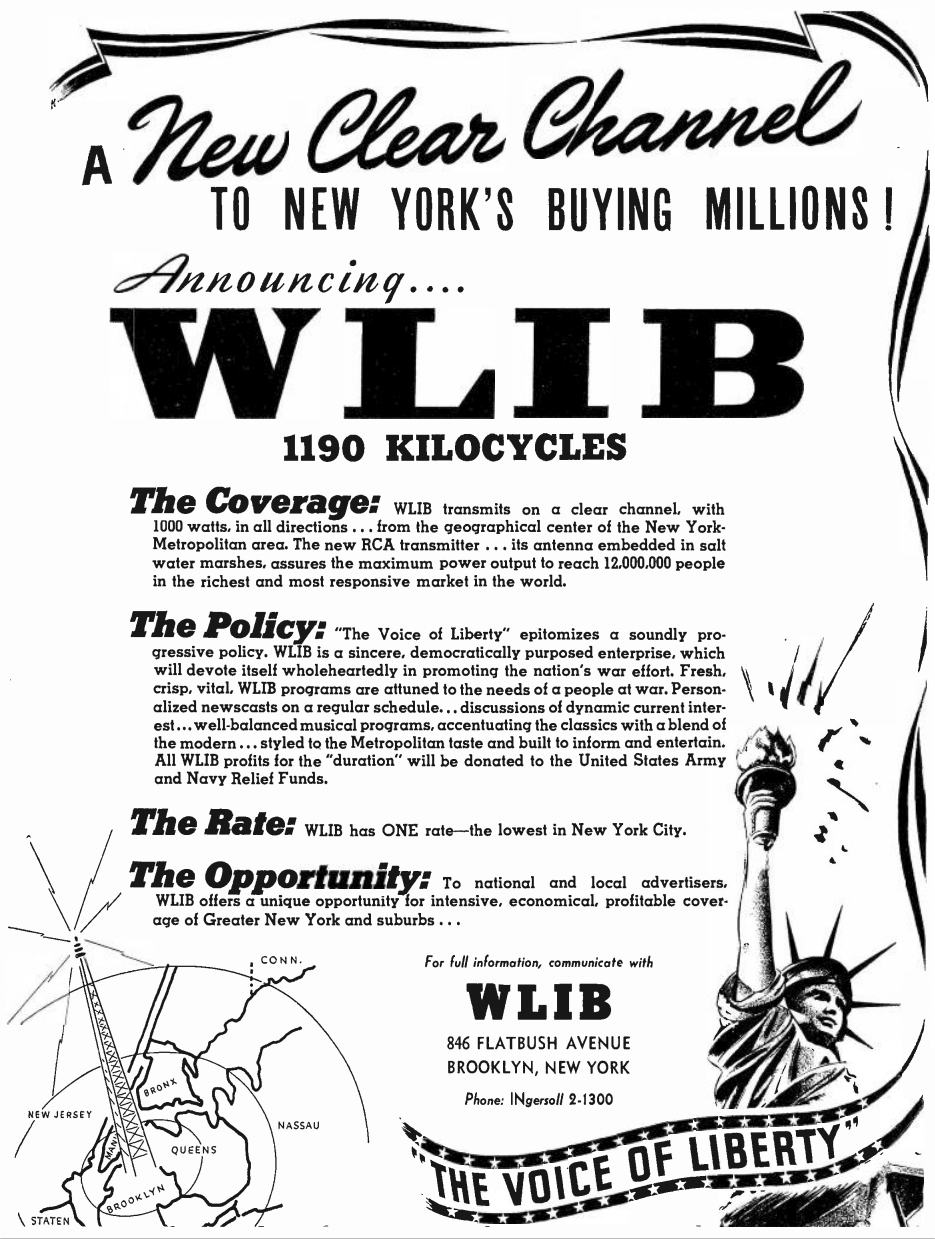
In 1942, the station moved to 1190 kHz and changed its call sign to WLIB.

WCNW shared time with WWRL on 1600 kHz with the 1941 enactment of the North American Regional Broadcasting Agreement (NARBA). The next year, the station was granted permission to move down the dial to 1190 kHz. While it now had its own frequency, it was a daytimer, required to go off the air at night.

=== New York Post ===
WCNW, which broadcast foreign language programs, was purchased by its general manager, Elias Godofsky, who changed the call sign to WLIB. The station's target audience was upper middle-class and wealthy New Yorkers, as evidenced by its format of classical music and adult standards which competed with WQXR. The station was purchased by New York Post publisher Dorothy Schiff in 1944 and regularly ran news updates from the paper's newsroom several times during the day.

In 1949, WLIB was purchased by the New Broadcasting Company. The firm was headed by former WNYC executive Morris S. Novik and his brother, garment executive Harry Novik. Upon taking control of the station the Novik brothers returned WLIB to a station serving ethnic audiences, with large amounts of programming targeting the city's Jewish, and African American communities.

=== African-American programming ===
The station eventually became the leading voice of New York's black residents. It had its studios in the community's epicenter at "Harlem Radio Center" in the Hotel Theresa in Harlem. During the mid-to-late 1950s, its airstaff included pioneering black disc jockey Hal Jackson, actor William Marshall, and Victor Bozeman, who would later become a Los Angeles-based staff announcer for NBC television. Journalists Bill McCreary, and Gil Noble also got their start in WLIB's news department, before each made the leap to television in the mid-1960s.

In the 1960s. WLIB had blocks of time devoted to jazz music. Among its disc jockeys was noted jazz musician Billy Taylor. During much of this period WLIB's primary competition came from 1600 WWRL, another station which programmed to Black audiences. In 1965, WLIB put an FM station on the air, WLIB-FM at 107.5 MHz. At first, the two stations would simulcast their programming. But over time, WLIB-FM began a separate schedule of R&B and jazz music with fewer commercials and less DJ interruptions. Today that station is WBLS, New York's top station serving the African American community. It was sold to Mediaco in 2019.

WLIB became black-owned in the 1970s after activists picketed the station and demanded African Americans be given a chance to purchase it. Many felt the station's series of white owners didn't care about broadcasting with community concerns in mind. Percy Sutton, Malcolm X's former attorney and then-Manhattan borough president, formed the Inner City Broadcasting Corporation (ICBC). The company had the backing of a group of black investors, including Hal Jackson and Billy Taylor. It purchased WLIB from the Novik brothers in 1972. The station's first talk shows featured Betty Shabazz, widow of Malcolm X, and Dr. Carlos Russell, a noted former college professor who taught some of the black and Latino students who later founded the Young Lords.

=== Adding nighttime broadcasts ===
Through much of its history, WLIB was a daytimer and could not be on the air at night. Its hours were limited to broadcasting between sunrise in New York and sunset in Fort Wayne, Indiana. AM 1190 was a clear channel frequency on which WOWO in Fort Wayne was the dominant station in the East. If WLIB stayed on the air at night, it would interfere with WOWO's signal. Inner City Broadcasting decided to remedy this problem.

The company purchased the Fort Wayne station in 1994 for the sole purpose of lowering its nighttime power. That set the stage for WLIB to eventually begin broadcasting around the clock. After gaining Federal Communications Commission approval for 24-hour broadcasting, it would still be a few years before WLIB would actually begin nighttime programming. In the meantime Inner City sold off WOWO, whose nighttime power was reduced to 9,800 watts from its previous 50,000 watts. It is now owned by Federated Media.

=== Politics ===
After becoming black-owned, the station broadcast political, Afrocentric, and health-centered programming aimed at New York's Caribbean American community. WLIB's advocacy strength was credited with getting out the vote for David Dinkins in 1989 as he ran to become New York City's first black mayor.

former WLIB logo, as an Air America affiliate

In the 1990s and 2000s, WLIB saw its audience decrease as more radio listeners tuned in FM stations for music. In 2004, the station affiliated with Air America, a network specializing in progressive talk. The change was controversial, with many in the community seeing the switch as replacing local black activist programming with Air America's national, primarily white, liberal on-air personalities. Air America featured shows hosted by Al Franken, Randi Rhodes and Rachel Maddow. The network was heard most of the day over WLIB with the exception of overnights, when the station aired the Global Black Experience, hosted by Imhotep Gary Byrd.

Air America programming left WLIB on August 31, 2006. The network moved to 1600 WWRL the next day. It was rumored that the progressive talk format would be retained on WLIB using local hosts and syndicated talker Ed Schultz, under a lease agreement with Randy Michaels' company, Radioactive, LLC. However negotiations fell through, and on August 21, 2006, WLIB announced that it would switch to an urban gospel format.

=== Sale to Emmis ===
Previous WLIB logo, as a gospel station

Following Inner City Broadcasting's bankruptcy in 2012, WLIB and its FM sister station 107.5 WBLS, along with Inner City's other broadcast properties, were sold. The stations were acquired by YMF Media LLC, owned jointly by investor Ronald Burkle and former professional basketball player Earvin "Magic" Johnson.

Over the next two years, YMF sold off all of the stations it acquired from Inner City. On February 11, 2014, Emmis Communications announced its purchase of WLIB and WBLS for $131 million. Emmis began operating the stations under a local marketing agreement (LMA) until receiving final approval from the FCC, which came on June 10, 2014.

On January 10, 2025, the station flipped to a simulcast of the new Spanish-language La Exitosa format adopted by FM sister WEPN-FM, which carries a gold-based mix of Latin pop and English-language adult contemporary hits, with programming and imaging conducted in Spanish.
