= WQHK-FM =

Radio station in Huntertown, Indiana

Coordinates: 41.1109°N 85.1955°W

- Huntertown, Indiana; United States
- Broadcast area: Fort Wayne, Indiana
- Frequency: 105.1 MHz
- Branding: K105

Programming
- Format: Country music

Ownership
- Owner: Federated Media; (Pathfinder Communications Corporation)
- Sister stations: WBYR; WFWI; WKJG; WMEE; WOWO

History
- First air date: November 8, 1966
- Former call signs: WADM-FM (1966–1984); WMCZ (July–August 1984); WQTZ (1984–1993)
- Former frequencies: 92.7 MHz (1966–1993)

Technical information
- Licensing authority: FCC
- Facility ID: 29859
- Class: B1
- ERP: 5,700 watts
- HAAT: 210 meters (690 ft)

Links
- Public license information: Public file; LMS
- Webcast: Listen live
- Website: www.k105fm.com

WQHK-FM (105.1 MHz) is a radio station located in Huntertown, Indiana, United States, and broadcasting to the Fort Wayne area.

== History ==
Today's WQHK-FM went on the air from Decatur, Indiana, as WADM-FM 92.7 on November 8, 1966. It was owned by Airon, Incorporated, alongside WADM (1540 AM). The WADM stations were purchased outright by WFYC, Inc., owner of the WFYC stations in Alma, Michigan, in 1978.

Midwest Communications Company, owned by Richard Sommerville and his son, acquired the pair in 1984; Richard's brother David owned 35 percent of the seller, and other family members were involved in radio holdings in Michigan. The call letters were first changed to WMCZ, but a federal judge ordered a change after WMEE (97.3 FM) sued on the similarity of the two call signs' sounds; until it could change to WQTZ, the Decatur station was ordered to include "not to be confused with WMEE FM 97" in all of its station identifications. One of the key developments in the trial was that the WMCZ station manager, when asked to cite WMEE's slogan, gave WMCZ's instead, bolstering the judge's finding of a likelihood of confusion. It was the first call sign similarity dispute to be mediated by a federal judge; the responsibility for these disputes had rested with the Federal Communications Commission until the start of 1984.

To coincide with a height increase on the tower and expanded coverage area, a new format was chosen to replace the two stations' adult contemporary programming on FM, and WQTZ flipped to oldies on December 1, 1985. In 1991, the station was approved for an upgrade to 25,000 watts on 105.1 MHz, which required WQTX, then on 105.1 from Roanoke, to move to 94.1; the move also opened up the 92.7 allocation in Berne now used by WZBD.

Previous logo

WQTZ and WADM were acquired by Julia A. Moore of Lebanon, Ohio, in 1992. Moore signed an agreement with Federated Media, owner of WMEE and WQHK (1380 AM), to co-own and manage the FM outlet. Though a simulcast of the classic country AM was originally slated, management felt that the market could support another country station. The format flip and frequency change took effect together on June 29, 1993, when WQHK-FM 105.1 debuted.
