= WERT =

- Van Wert, Ohio; United States
- Broadcast area: Van Wert County; Lima, Ohio (limited)
- Frequency: 1220 kHz
- Branding: Unforgettable 1220

Programming
- Format: Adult standards
- Affiliations: Agri Broadcast Network; Ohio State Sports Network

Ownership
- Owner: First Family Broadcasting
- Sister stations: WKSD

History
- First air date: November 27, 1958
- Call sign meaning: Van Wert

Technical information
- Licensing authority: FCC
- Facility ID: 56181
- Class: D
- Power: 250 watts (day); 29 watts (night)
- Transmitter coordinates: 40°52′19″N 84°33′15″W
- Translator: 104.3 W282CF (Van Wert)

Links
- Public license information: Public file; LMS
- Webcast: Listen live
- Website: streamdb5web.securenetsystems.net/cirrusencore/WERT

WERT (1220 AM) is a radio station broadcasting adult standards featuring soft oldies from the 1940s through today. Licensed to Van Wert, Ohio, United States, the station serves Van Wert primarily but is considered part of the Lima market. The station is owned by First Family Broadcasting and broadcasts from its studios on the Lincoln Highway (County Highway 418) just east of Van Wert.

== History ==
From its first day of broadcasting on November 27, 1958, WERT, then owned by the Van Wert Broadcasting Company, has traditionally been a middle of the road formatted music station. WERT's original design engineer was also instrumental in the founding of WMVR in Sidney in 1963. The original owners also built and launched WERT-FM (98.9) in 1962, giving Van Wert its own FM service.

WERT and WERT-FM were sold to a California company in 1967 for $160,000, according to an article in that year's Van Wert Times Bulletin newspaper. The west coast firm would absentee own and operate the stations for the next four years. Ray Livesay, from Mattoon, Illinois, then purchased the stations in 1971 and operated them throughout much of the 1970s and 1980s, boosting the power of WERT-FM to 50,000 watts in 1984.

In 1988, Atlantic Resources, based in Cincinnati, Ohio, bought the stations for a reported $1 million with intentions to move the high power WERT-FM to Fort Wayne, Indiana, where it remains today as WBYR. WERT was then paired with a new FM station: WKSD, licensed to Paulding, Ohio, at 99.7 MHz. WERT and WKSD were sold to Community Broadcasting of Van Wert in 1991. In 1994 Chris Roberts (previously with WOWO in Fort Wayne) purchased the stations after forming First Family Broadcasting, Inc.

== Programming ==
WERT broadcasts a mix of adult standards from the 1940s through today from its studios along Lincoln Highway. It is the heritage station serving the Van Wert area, and is co-owned with oldies/sports radio station WKSD 99.7 FM in Paulding.

For many years WERT aired programming from Citadel Media's "Timeless Favorites" format. After "Timeless Favorites" was discontinued in February 2010, the station opted to return to locally originating programming.

A powerful windstorm powered by the remnants of Hurricane Ike caused damage to its transmitting tower on September 14, 2008. According to a WLIO news story dated September 15, 2008, engineers from the Fort Wayne area along with Chief Engineer Chris Roberts, also the principal owner, worked feverishly to bring the station back on the air. In the interim, WERT continued to operate with reduced power by means of a temporary antenna and an internet audiostream until September 19, 2008, when the new tower was finished. The station returned to full power late in the afternoon on that day as reported by the Van Wert Independent newspaper.

== Station ownership ==
- 1958–1967: Van Wert Radio
- 1967–1971: California Radio
- 1971–1988: Livesay Broadcasting
- 1988–1991: Atlantic Resources
- 1991–1994 Community Broadcasting
- 1994–present: First Family Broadcasting, Inc.
