= WTRC-FM =

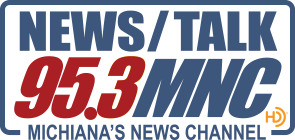
- Niles, Michigan; United States
- Broadcast area: South Bend metropolitan area
- Frequency: 95.3 MHz (HD Radio)
- Branding: News Talk 95.3 MNC

Programming
- Format: News/talk
- Network: Fox News Radio
- Affiliations: Compass Media Networks; Premiere Networks; Regional Radio Sports Network; Westwood One

Ownership
- Owner: Federated Media; (Pathfinder Communications Corporation)
- Sister stations: WTRC; WAOR; WBYT; WRBR-FM

History
- First air date: September 13, 1968
- Former call signs: WNIL-FM (1968–1977); WAOR (1977–2010)
- Call sign meaning: Truth Radio Corporation (former owner of WTRC)

Technical information
- Licensing authority: FCC
- Facility ID: 48911
- Class: A
- ERP: 5,500 watts
- HAAT: 84 meters (276 ft)
- Transmitter coordinates: 41°44′16.2″N 86°15′10″W

Links
- Public license information: Public file; LMS
- Webcast: Listen live
- Website: www.953mnc.com

WTRC-FM (95.3 MHz; "News Talk 95.3 MNC") is a commercial radio station licensed to Niles, Michigan and serving the South Bend metropolitan area of Michigan and Indiana. It is owned by Federated Media and it airs a news-talk radio format patterned after Federated's station in Fort Wayne, WOWO. The studios and company headquarters are on Edison Road in Mishawaka, Indiana.

WTRC-FM has an effective radiated power (ERP) of 5,500 watts. The transmitter is on Brick Road near Indiana State Road 933 in South Bend. The station is licensed by the FCC to broadcast in the HD Radio digital hybrid format.

== Programming ==
Weekdays begin with Michiana's Morning News with Jon Zimney and Laura Smith. An Indiana-based afternoon drive time show, Burning Truth with Casey Hendrickson is shared with WOWO in Fort Wayne. The rest of the schedule is nationally syndicated conservative talk shows: The Glenn Beck Radio Program, The Clay Travis and Buck Sexton Show, The Sean Hannity Show, The Mark Levin Show and Coast to Coast AM with George Noory.

On weekends, WTRC-FM features specialty shows on money, health, law, technology, food and drink. Weekend syndicated programs include The Kim Komando Show, The Weekend with Michael Brown, Bill Handel on the Law, Sunday Nights with Bill Cunningham, Fox Across America with Jimmy Failla and Somewhere in Time with Art Bell. Most hours begin with an update from Fox News Radio.

== History ==
The station signed on the air on September 13, 1967. Its original call sign was WNIL-FM, as it was the FM sister station to WNIL (1290 AM). The station later played classic rock as WAOR; this format and call sign moved to 95.7 FM, now WRDI, in 2010.

After changing its call letters to WTRC-FM, the station switched to a news/talk format that was originally simulcast with WTRC (1340 AM) in Elkhart, Indiana. On May 5, 2014, WTRC and WTRC-FM began broadcasting separate morning shows, although the two stations continued to jointly broadcast most other programming. WTRC AM changed its format to soft oldies and adult standards on February 21, 2017, ending its WTRC-FM simulcast. In April 2023, the AM station returned to a news/talk format, again partially simulcast with WTRC-FM. The two stations share local drive time programming but air largely separate syndicated programming the rest of the day.
