= WLEG =

WLEG may refer to:

- WLEG-LP, a low-power radio station (104.3 FM) licensed to serve Goshen, Indiana, United States
- WAOR, a radio station (102.7 FM) licensed to serve Ligonier, Indiana, which held the call sign WLEG from 2002 to 2014
