= Federated Media (broadcasting) =

American radio broadcasting company

Federated Media is a privately held American company that owns and operates 10 radio stations based in northern Indiana and southern Michigan. Its corporate structure is complicated, involving various shell companies, such as Pathfinder Communications, Jam Communications and Talking Stick Communications, which hold the licenses of its various radio stations.

The company is headquartered in Mishawaka, Indiana.

Federated Media sold the Elkhart Truth newspaper based in Elkhart, Indiana to Paxton Media Group in 2016. Federated had run the newspaper since 1952. In February 2018, Federated Media entered into an agreement to sell ESPN Radio affiliate WFGA to Swick Broadcasting.

In August 2012, Federated Media stations affiliated with iHeartRadio.

== Stations ==
=== Current ===
| City of license / Market | Station | Channel | Licensee | Owned Since | Format |
|---|---|---|---|---|---|
| Elkhart, Indiana | WBYT | 100.7 FM | Pathfinder | 1994 | Country |
| Elkhart, Indiana | WTRC | 1340 AM | Pathfinder | 2002 | News/Talk |
| Huntertown, Indiana | WQHK-FM | 105.1 FM | Jam Communications | 1996 | Hot Country |
| Fort Wayne, Indiana | WFWI | 92.3 FM | Pathfinder | 1997 | News/Talk |
| Fort Wayne, Indiana | WKJG | 1380 AM | Pathfinder | 1971 | Sports |
| Fort Wayne, Indiana | WMEE | 97.3 FM | Pathfinder | 1971 | Hot Adult Contemporary |
| Fort Wayne, Indiana | WOWO | 1190 AM | Pathfinder | 1995 | News/Talk |
| Ligonier, Indiana | WAOR | 102.7 FM | Pathfinder | 2000 | Hot Adult Contemporary |
| South Bend, Indiana | WRBR-FM | 103.9 FM | Talking Stick | 2012 | Active Rock |
| Woodburn, Indiana | WBYR | 98.9 FM | Pathfinder | 1996 | Active Rock |
| Niles, Michigan | WTRC-FM | 95.3 FM | Pathfinder | 1999 | News/Talk |
