= WKJG =

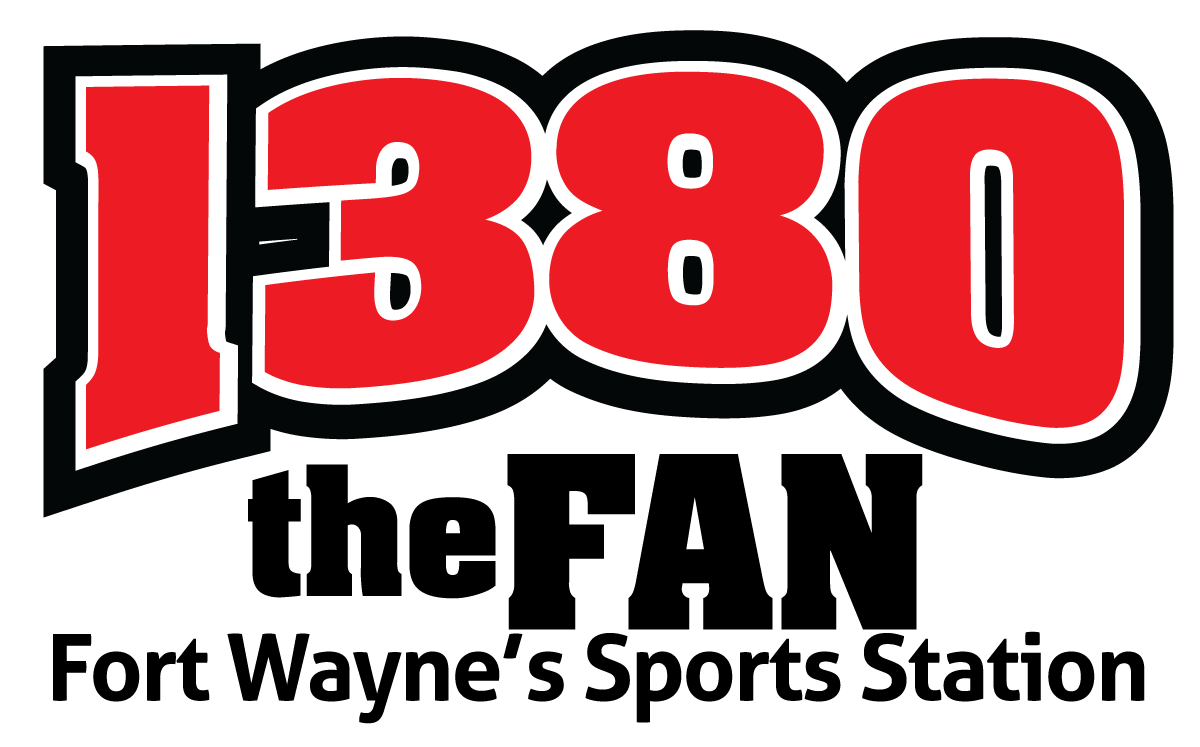
- Fort Wayne, Indiana; United States
- Broadcast area: Fort Wayne metro
- Frequency: 1380 kHz
- Branding: 1380 The Fan

Programming
- Language: English
- Format: Sports radio
- Affiliations: Fox Sports Radio; Westwood One Sports; Indianapolis Colts Radio Network; Chicago White Sox Radio Network

Ownership
- Owner: Federated Media; (Pathfinder Communications Corporation)
- Sister stations: WBYR; WFWI; WMEE; WOWO; WQHK-FM

History
- First air date: November 15, 1947
- Former call signs: WKJG (1947–1971); WMEE (1971–1979); WQHK (1979–1996); WHWD (1996–1999); WONO (1999–2003)
- Call sign meaning: William Kunkel, former Journal Gazette publisher

Technical information
- Licensing authority: FCC
- Facility ID: 51724
- Class: B
- Power: 5,000 watts
- Transmitter coordinates: 41°0′15.2″N 85°5′56.9″W
- Translator: 100.9 W265CY (Fort Wayne)

Links
- Public license information: Public file; LMS
- Webcast: Listen live; Listen live (via iHeartRadio)
- Website: 1380thefan.com

WKJG (1380 AM; "1380 The Fan") is a radio station located in Fort Wayne, Indiana. The station, owned by Federated Media, is Fort Wayne's Fox Sports Radio affiliate.

== History ==
Logo under ESPN Radio affiliation, used until August 16, 2020.

WKJG began broadcasting on November 15, 1947, under the ownership of Northeastern Indiana Broadcasting, itself controlled by William Kunkel. Kunkel was also the publisher of The Journal Gazette; the call letters are derived from both entities. Initially a Mutual affiliate, WKJG joined NBC Radio in 1956, after WOWO dropped NBC to go independent; this brought the station in line with sister station WKJG-TV (channel 33), which had been an NBC-TV affiliate since going on the air in 1953. The WKJG stations were sold to the Truth Publishing Company of Elkhart in 1957; in 1963, the stations came under the Communicana banner.

After WKJG-TV was sold in 1971 (albeit to an entity controlled by the Dille family, which also controlled Communicana), it was decided to change the call letters of the radio stations, citing the perceived difficulty in saying "WKJG". As a result, on October 1, WKJG, by then a top 40 station, became WMEE, with sister beautiful music station WKJG-FM (97.3 FM) becoming WMEF. The following year, WMEE ceased its NBC Radio affiliation. The station's owner became Federated Media in 1977.

The station changed its call letters to WQHK and adopted a country music format in 1979, with WMEE and the top 40 format being moved to WMEF's former 97.3 FM facility (where it remains to this day as a hot adult contemporary station). In 1991, the station moved to emphasizing classic country, carrying the ABC Radio/Satellite Music Network (now Cumulus Media Networks)-distributed Real Country network; two years later, Federated Media launched WQHK-FM with a more contemporary country music format. The AM station continued with classic country until 1995, when it changed to a talk format. The station became adult standards station WHWD (reflecting its branding, "Radio Hollywood") on March 26, 1996, with most programming being provided by ABC's Stardust service; some of WQHK's talk shows were moved to sister station WOWO.

WHWD adopted the current sports format, initially provided by One on One Sports, in September 1998. To reflect the One on One affiliation, the call letters were changed to WONO in November 1999; however, the following August, the station switched to ESPN Radio. The WONO call letters were nonetheless retained until November 3, 2003, when the WKJG call letters, which had been dropped by channel 33 (now WISE-TV) a few months earlier, were restored.

From 2012 to 2018, the station was simulcast on then-sister FM station WFGA. This arrangement ended in May 2018 with the station's sale to Swick Broadcasting Company, and subsequent switch to classic country.

On August 15, 2020, the station announced that beginning August 17 that they would switch to Fox Sports Radio.

== Programming ==
Most programming on WKJG is provided by Fox Sports Radio; the station also carries Fort Wayne TinCaps baseball games, as well as Indianapolis Colts starting in 2020 PFW, and Purdue University sports. Local game broadcast time is purchased by local sports team. Outside of the game broadcasts, the station has a few local sports shows, including "Caleb and Kenny in the Morning" with Caleb Hatch and Justin Kenny on weekday mornings, "The Sports Rush with Brett Rump" on weekday afternoons, and "Talkin' Sports with Jim Shovlin" on Saturday mornings.

== See also ==
- WISE-TV, former sister station
