= Federated Media =

Federated Media may refer to:

== Businesses ==
- Federated Media (broadcasting), a radio broadcasting company based in Mishawaka, Indiana
- Federated Media Publishing, an advertising network founded by John Battelle in 2005 and sold to LIN Media in 2014
