= Doug Stephan =

American radio talk show personality

Doug Stephan is an American radio talk show personality who hosts several nationally syndicated radio shows for Talk Media Network.

== Radio Programs ==
Doug Stephan's "Good Day" was a morning talk radio program airing live Monday through Friday from 6 am until 9 am ET, featuring a fast paced format covering a variety of topics, ending in May 2024.

Stephan continues to host "The Talk Radio Countdown Show," "Good Day Health Show," and "American Family Farmer."

Doug Stephan, born November 5, 1946, began his career in radio as a deejay in the early 1960s in Tiffin, Ohio and thereafter decided to become a talk radio show host. He broadcasts from his home in Framingham, Massachusetts, where he operates a dairy farm, Eastleigh Farm.

On May 3, 2024, Stephan will reduce his schedule to weekends only, as he joins Talk Media Network and United Stations Radio Networks. The move coincides with the closure of Genesis Communications Network, and the loss of Westwood One satellite distribution by Audio 1, which had been producing the show.

== Other ventures ==
Stephan's company Tiffin Broadcasting, LLC owned WTTF (1600 kHz, W227BJ 93.3 MHz) in Tiffin, Ohio, the same station where he began his broadcasting career. In late 2008, Stephan announced his intention to donate WTTF to his alma mater Heidelberg College; Heidelberg declined to acquire the station, and it was instead sold to Anthony Paradiso, a business partner of Stephan's, in 2014.

His company Viva Communications formerly owned WSDE AM, 1190 kHz in Cobleskill, New York. WSDE, whose call sign comes from Stephan's initials, remains an affiliate of Stephan's "Good Day" program.
