= WRBR-FM =

Coordinates: 41.698°N 86.157°W

- South Bend, Indiana; United States
- Broadcast area: South Bend, Indiana
- Frequency: 103.9 MHz
- Branding: 103.9 The Bear

Programming
- Format: Active rock
- Affiliations: United Stations Radio Networks

Ownership
- Owner: Federated Media; (Talking Stick Communications)
- Sister stations: WAOR, WBYT, WTRC, WTRC-FM

History
- First air date: 1964
- Former call signs: WJVA-FM (1964–1968); WRBR (1969–1981); WXMG (1981–1984); WZZP (1984–1991)

Technical information
- Licensing authority: FCC
- Facility ID: 27145
- Class: A
- ERP: 3,000 watts
- HAAT: 100 meters (330 ft)

Links
- Public license information: Public file; LMS
- Webcast: Listen live
- Website: www.1039thebear.com

WRBR-FM (103.9 MHz) is a radio station in South Bend, Indiana, United States, broadcasting an active rock format. The station is owned by Federated Media. WRBR-FM hosts several concerts and activities in the South Bend area. WRBR-FM was formerly an oldies station before switching to an active rock format on March 15, 1996.

== History ==
The station was first licensed as WJVA-FM on August 5, 1964; it became WRBR in 1968. Its Top 40 format lasted until 1981 when its call letters changed to WXMG and flipped to adult contemporary. In 1984, the call letters were changed to WZZP; four years later, the station returned to a Top 40/CHR format, competing against WNDU-FM. A few years later, in 1991, the station returned to the WRBR-FM call letters. WRBR dropped CHR in 1993 for an oldies format which lasted until flipping to rock on March 15, 1996.
