= Bob Chase =

American sportscaster (1926–2016)

- Born: Robert Donald Wallenstein; January 22, 1926; Negaunee, Michigan, U.S.
- Died: November 24, 2016 (aged 90); Fort Wayne, Indiana, U.S.
- Sports commentary career
- Team: Fort Wayne Komets (1953–2016)
- Genre: Play-by-play
- Sport(s): Ice hockey Basketball; American football Auto racing

Bob Chase (born Robert Donald Wallenstein, January 22, 1926 – November 24, 2016) was an American sportscaster, known for his long career calling play-by-play for the Fort Wayne Komets hockey games. For 63 seasons, Chase called the action on radio and/or television. Only Vin Scully, who called play-by-play for 67 seasons with the Brooklyn/Los Angeles Dodgers, had a longer broadcasting tenure with a single franchise.

Chase married his wife, Muriel, on April 6, 1950. Because his boss at WOWO thought the name "Wallenstein" was too lengthy for the airwaves, he took his wife's maiden name for use on the air.

== Biography ==
=== Early life and career ===
Chase was born in Negaunee, Michigan. He played hockey as a child and attended Graveraet High School. At the age of 17, he enlisted in the United States Navy, and served as a cryptographer during World War II. Chase attended Northern Michigan University, where he graduated in 1952. In 1949, while attending Northern Michigan, Chase began his broadcasting career at WDMJ in Marquette. Upon his graduation, he moved to Fort Wayne, Indiana where he was hired as a DJ at WOWO. He served a variety of roles at WOWO, including program director, DJ, marketing and promotions director, sports director, and program host. He retired from full time duties at WOWO in 2009.

=== Fort Wayne Komets (1953–2016) ===
Chase is best known for his association with the minor-league Fort Wayne Komets. He began his tenure with the Komets in 1953 as the team's co-announcer, and took over full-time duties in 1954. For many years, Chase's Komets broadcast was the only International Hockey League broadcast on the air. Aided by the long range of WOWO's 50,000-watt signal, Chase's voice was known and heard throughout the Midwest and out to the East Coast – over 28 states in all, plus half of Canada – and overseas in Europe.

Chase broadcast over 4,500 Komets games throughout his career, including 526 of the 532 playoff games played during his time with the Komets. Chase also broadcast every IHL All-Star game played from the inaugural contest in 1962 until 1999, when the Komets left the league. Over the course of his career, Chase turned down the play-by-play job for the Detroit Red Wings in 1962 in favor of his friend and incumbent, Bruce Martyn, and was considered for posts with the Boston Bruins, California Golden Seals, Minnesota North Stars, St. Louis Blues, and Washington Capitals. Chase called his last Komets game on May 15, 2016.

=== Other broadcasting history ===
Bob Chase was the only broadcaster of the IHL All-Star Game from the time he joined the Komets until 1999, the year the Komets left the IHL.

Along with his hockey duties, Chase covered high school basketball for 17 years. One of his notable basketball moments was when he covered the famed 1954 Milan High School and their win in the state basketball championship. The 1954 Milan team was later memorialized as the team that inspired the 1986 movie, "Hoosiers".

Chase also broadcast Big Ten football for 10 years, and he announced the Indianapolis 500 for 25 years.

== Broadcasting style ==
Chase borrowed from a pair of Canadian broadcasters, Foster Hewitt and Danny Gallivan, who were famous for the "Hockey Night in Canada". His best critic was his father, Gunnard. The elder Chase offered key advice that the son molded into a presentation that became known to his followers as "Radio Rinkside", so named because of Chase's ability to describe the action in a way that left the listener with a feeling of being right there watching the game as it was being played.

Chase was famous for his colorful and enthusiastic calling of play-by-play. One of Chase's most often repeated cries evolved from his coverage of the breakaway. Fans know Chase for calling "He looks, he shoots, HE SCORES!" In addition, he rarely missed a chance to promote the radio station. Going into commercial breaks, he would remind listeners, "on WOWO, this is KOMET hockey".

== Non-broadcasting activities ==
Beyond his duties as a sports announcer, Chase was often found behind the WOWO microphone interviewing famous personalities. His interview list included Elvis, the Beatles, Jim Brown, Frank Sinatra, Bob Hope, then Vice President Richard Nixon, Gordie Howe, and Arnold Palmer.

Outside the broadcast booth, Chase served as the general manager of the Komets during the 1989–90 season, which saw the Komets achieve a 37–34–11 record and a playoff berth.

== Awards and honors ==
=== Lester Patrick Trophy ===
In a ceremony held on October 15, 2012, Chase was a recipient of the prestigious Lester Patrick Trophy. The trophy has been awarded annually since 1966 in appreciation for contributions to the sport of ice hockey in the United States. Chase became only the 5th broadcaster to receive this award.

=== Retired Jersey / Fort Wayne Komets Hall of Fame ===
In 1993, Chase's 40th season of broadcasting Komet hockey games, the hockey club retired jersey number 40 in his honor. It was raised to the rafters of the Memorial Coliseum, where it is permanently displayed with the other jerseys retired by the team.

In 2003, after his 50th season of broadcasting Komet hockey games, Chase was inducted into the Fort Wayne Komets Hall of Fame.

=== Other honors ===
In addition to the Lester Patrick Trophy and the recognition bestowed by the Komets, Chase has received numerous other professional and non-professional honors. Included on that list are:

- 2000 – Inductee, Indiana Broadcasters Association's Broadcast Pioneers Hall of Fame
- 2001 – Named a Sagamore of the Wabash.
- 2002 – Inductee, Baer Field Speedway Hall of Fame
- 2002 – Inductee, Indiana Sportswriters and Sports Broadcasters Hall of Fame
- 2006 – Inductee, Indiana High School Hockey Hall of Fame
- 2009 – Inductee, Upper Peninsula Sports Hall of Fame
- 2009–10 – IHL Broadcaster of the Year
- 2010 – Recipient, Mad Anthony's Red Coat
- 2013 – Recipient, Key to the Fort, awarded by Fort Wayne Mayor Tom Henry
- 2013–14 – ECHL Broadcaster of the Year
- (Dates Uncertain) – UHL, CHL Broadcaster of the Year
- On June 27, 2017, the Allen County War Memorial Coliseum Board of Trustees voted unanimously to rename the circle driveway in front of the Ticket Office in honor of Bob Chase. The street "Bob Chase Way" was officially unveiled with commemorative signage and a ceremony in the fall of 2017.

Fellow Lester Patrick Trophy recipient and Hall of Fame broadcaster Mike Emrick, seen by some as the voice of hockey in America because of his broadcasting on the NHL on NBC, counted Chase as his mentor. In his formative years, Emrick routinely sent his broadcasts to Chase for critique. Before Emrick developed his own broadcasting style, he tried to imitate Chase. In January 2012, Emrick joined Chase and his broadcast partner of 33 years, former Komet all-star goalie Robbie Irons, in the Komet broadcast booth as the three shared play-by-play during a game in which Chase was honored. This joint effort fulfilled life-long dreams of both Chase and Emrick.

== Illness and death ==
Chase died of congestive heart failure in the early morning hours of Thanksgiving Day, on November 24, 2016. Chase was survived by his wife, four children, eight grandchildren, and nine great-grandchildren.

In a sign of respect to Chase, his body lay in repose at center ice at the Allen County War Memorial Coliseum on November 29. Hundreds of fans filed past the open casket for the chance to see Chase one last time in the building where Chase worked his profession for his entire 63-year tenure with the Komets. The next day, a private ceremony was held for family and close friends. Several friends, family, and trade associates spoke about their relationship with Chase. The day ended with a military service at graveside. Chase was laid to rest at Riverview Cemetery in Churubusco, Indiana.

== Bibliography ==
- (2009). Live From Radio Rinkside: The Bob Chase Story. Bob Chase, Blake Sebring (As Told By). <city, state>: Authorhouse. ISBN 9781438944814
