= In a Little Red Barn (On a Farm Down in Indiana) =

"In a Little Red Barn (on a Farm down in Indiana)" was a popular song written by Joe Young (lyricist), Jean Schwartz, and Milton Ager in 1934. It used the same harmonic structure as the 1917 "Back Home Again in Indiana" (also called just "Indiana"). Both "In a Little Red Barn" and "Indiana" borrowed many of the same words and phrases used in the 1897 "On the Banks of the Wabash".

"In a Little Red Barn" was widely popular on the radio in the 1930s and was used in many films from the 1930s to the 1950s. The "Little Red Barn" was also the theme song for the morning radio show on WOWO in Fort Wayne, Indiana, hosted by Bob Sievers. "Nancy Lee and the Hilltoppers" performed the song; Nancy Lee was the wife of Sam DeVincent, music librarian for WOWO.

VERSE 1

I was born 'way down in Indiana,
Wish that I were there right now.
Want to hear my dog bow-wow
When I go to milk the cow.
Raised on corn 'way down in Indiana,
So was ev'ry little hen.
I was mighty happy then;
Wish that I were back a-gain:

CHORUS:

In a little red barn on a farm down in Indiana,
Let me lay my back on a stack of new mown hay.
'Round the barnyard where the farmyard folks are pally,
Let me dilly-dally all the live-long day.
I'm a Hoosier who's blue, thru and thru, and my heart is pining
For the sycamore trees where the Wabash breezes play.
What's more, I'm pining for a yellow moon that's shining
On a little red barn on a farm down Indiana way.

VERSE 2

Work was done 'way down in Indiana,
Picked the eggs the chickens lay;
Pushed the plow and pitched the hay;
Ev'ry day a busy day.
Had my fun 'way down in Indiana
When the sun would go to rest.
Saw it sinkin' in the West;
That's the time I liked the best.

The song was included in the 1953 animated short Robot Rabbit, in which it is sung by Elmer Fudd and Bugs Bunny.

== See also ==
- Robot Rabbit
