= WBYR =

Radio station in Woodburn–Fort Wayne, Indiana

Woodburn, Indiana; United States
- Broadcast area: Fort Wayne, Indiana
- Frequency: 98.9 MHz
- Branding: 98.9 The Bear

Programming
- Format: Active rock
- Affiliations: United Stations Radio Networks

Ownership
- Owner: Federated Media; (Pathfinder Communications Corporation)
- Sister stations: WOWO (AM), WFWI, WKJG, WMEE, WQHK-FM

History
- First air date: 1962
- Former call signs: WERT-FM (1962–1987); WKSD (1987–1989)
- Call sign meaning: "Bear"

Technical information
- Licensing authority: FCC
- Facility ID: 55659
- Class: B
- ERP: 50,000 watts
- HAAT: 138 meters (453 ft)
- Transmitter coordinates: 40°57′14.00″N 84°53′7.00″W

Links
- Public license information: Public file; LMS
- Webcast: Listen live
- Website: 989thebear.com

WBYR (98.9 FM), branded as 98.9 The Bear, is a radio station licensed to Woodburn, Indiana with studios in Fort Wayne, Indiana. The station broadcasts an active rock format. WBYR is owned by Federated Media.

== History ==
WBYR was the former WERT-FM and WKSD in Van Wert, Ohio, owned by Ray Livesay. WERT-FM was first licensed on November 16, 1962; throughout the 1960s and 1970s, it simulcast WERT (1220 AM). When the FCC gave the ultimatum for Class B FM stations to increase power to maximum levels or be downgraded, WERT-FM increased power to 50,000 watts and introduced a beautiful music format. Once the station was sold to Atlantic Resources, the call letters were changed to WKSD ("Kiss 99") with a satellite-delivered adult contemporary format.

In January 1989, the station began stunting with comedy clips (including Looney Tunes clips), construction sound effects and a vague but brief announcement repeatedly for about a week, "9890 songs in a row on Fort Wayne's new 98.9". A classic hits format debuted on January 11 at noon, with the first song being "Old Time Rock and Roll" by Bob Seger. Meanwhile, the WKSD calls resurfaced at 99.7 FM licensed to Paulding, Ohio; WKSD 99.7 FM now features oldies and sports talk as a sister station to WERT.
