= WKSD =

- Paulding, Ohio; United States
- Broadcast area: Paulding, Ohio; Van Wert, Ohio
- Frequency: 99.7 MHz
- Branding: Classic Hits Hot 99.7

Programming
- Format: Classic hits (day); Sports (night)
- Affiliations: ABC News Radio; ESPN Radio; Ohio State Sports Network

Ownership
- Owner: First Family Broadcasting
- Sister stations: WERT

History
- First air date: June 7, 1989
- Former call signs: WKSD (1989–1992); WERT-FM (1992–1996)

Technical information
- Licensing authority: FCC
- Facility ID: 56182
- Class: A
- ERP: 3,000 watts
- HAAT: 100 meters (330 ft)
- Transmitter coordinates: 41°3′32.00″N 84°35′30.00″W

Links
- Public license information: Public file; LMS

WKSD (99.7 FM) is a radio station broadcasting a locally produced classic hits format. Licensed to Paulding, Ohio, United States, the station is owned by First Family Broadcasting and features news programming from ABC News Radio.

== History ==
The station went on the air as WKSD on June 7, 1989. On April 10, 1992, the station changed its call sign to WERT-FM, and on September 6, 1996, changed back to the original WKSD.

WKSD serves as a sister station to WERT (AM) 1220 kHz in neighboring Van Wert. The original WERT-FM at 98.9 in Van Wert is now WBYR, a Fort Wayne market station no longer co-owned with WERT. That station has since changed its city of license to Woodburn, Indiana.
