= 1190 AM =

Medium-wave radio frequency

The following radio stations broadcast on AM frequency 1190 kHz: 1190 AM is a United States clear-channel frequency. KEX in Portland, Oregon, is the dominant Class A station on 1190 kHz. WOWO, in Fort Wayne, Indiana, is a former Class A station on this frequency but was reduced to Class B when it downgraded its nighttime power in 1999. XEWK-AM, in Guadalajara, Jalisco, is a former class A Mexican station on this frequency but fully migrated to FM in 2021.

== In Argentina ==
- LRA15 Nacional in San Miguel de Tucuman
- LR9 in Buenos Aires

== In Canada ==
- CFSL in Weyburn, Saskatchewan - 10 kW daytime, 5 kW nighttime, transmitter located at 49.465833°N 103.8425°W

== In Mexico ==
- XECT-AM in Monterrey, Nuevo León
- XEMBC-AM in Mexicali, Baja California
- XEPP-AM in Orizaba, Veracruz
- XEPZ-AM in Ciudad Juárez, Chihuahua
- XEXQ-AM in San Luis Potosí, San Luis Potosí

== In the United States ==
Stations in bold are clear-channel stations.

Call sign	City of license	Facility ID	Class	Daytime power (kW)	Nighttime power (kW)	Critical hours power (kW)	Transmitter coordinates
KASZ	White Hall, Arkansas	161393	B	25	0.35		34.283611°N 92.1275°W
KDAO	Marshalltown, Iowa	46754	D	0.25	0.02		42.071389°N 92.921944°W
KDMR	Kansas City, Missouri	4373	B	5	0.5		39.063611°N 94.510278°W
KDYA	Vallejo, California	54263	D	3			38.134167°N 122.425556°W
**KEX**	Portland, Oregon	11271	A	50	50		45.422222°N 122.565833°W
KFXR	Dallas, Texas	25375	B	50	5		32.786111°N 96.95°W (daytime); 32.899167°N 96.413056°W (nighttime)
KGBN	Anaheim, California	2194	B	20	1.3		33.945°N 117.862222°W
KKOJ	Jackson, Minnesota	35056	D	5			43.529167°N 95.001389°W
KNUV	Tolleson, Arizona	29019	D	0.64	0.022		33.445°N 112.265°W
KREB	Gentry, Arkansas	30935	D	3			36.388333°N 94.192778°W
KVCU	Boulder, Colorado	48965	D	6.8	0.11	5	39.964722°N 105.235278°W
KVSV	Beloit, Kansas	60773	D	2.3	0.09		39.448056°N 98.079167°W
KXKS	Albuquerque, New Mexico	13789	D	10	0.024		35.051111°N 106.642778°W
WAFS	Atlanta, Georgia	72111	D	25			33.809444°N 84.353889°W
WAMT	Pine Castle-Sky Lake, Florida	15877	B	4.7	0.23		28.466667°N 81.374722°W
WBMJ	San Juan, Puerto Rico	8440	B	10	5		18.35°N 66.113889°W
WEUV	Moulton, Alabama	43896	D	2.5			34.481944°N 87.301111°W
WIXE	Monroe, North Carolina	43533	D	5	0.07		34.961389°N 80.544444°W
WJPJ	Humboldt, Tennessee	6582	D	0.42			35.844722°N 88.902222°W
WLIB	New York, New York	28204	B	10	30		40.796667°N 74.101667°W
WMEJ	Bay St. Louis, Mississippi	25961	D	5			30.323611°N 89.350833°W
WNDC	Leesburg, Virginia	54876	B	50	1.2		39.041111°N 77.445°W
WNWC	Sun Prairie, Wisconsin	17381	D	4.8	0.021		43.16°N 89.215278°W
WOWO	Fort Wayne, Indiana	28205	B	50	9.8		40.996389°N 85.351667°W
WPAA	St. Marys, Georgia	38286	D	1.8			30.763056°N 81.610833°W
WPSP	Royal Palm Beach, Florida	23822	B	0.69	0.41		26.816944°N 80.251944°W
WPVW	Wabasha, Minnesota	54624	D	1			44.346111°N 91.978056°W
WSDE	Cobleskill, New York	4002	D	1	0.02		42.690556°N 74.444444°W
WSDQ	Dunlap, Tennessee	67280	D	5		1	35.361389°N 85.375833°W
WVUS	Grafton, West Virginia	64661	D	0.25	0.022		39.350556°N 80.043889°W
