= WLZZ =

Radio station in Montpelier, Ohio

- Montpelier, Ohio; United States
- Broadcast area: Bryan, Ohio
- Frequency: 104.5 MHz
- Branding: Z104

Programming
- Format: Country
- Affiliations: Fox News Radio

Ownership
- Owner: Stephen Swick dba Swick Broadcasting Corporation
- Sister stations: WLKI, WTHD, WBET, WBET-FM

History
- First air date: 1991
- Former call signs: WYDF (1991)

Technical information
- Licensing authority: FCC
- Facility ID: 36272
- Class: A
- ERP: 3,000 watts
- HAAT: 100 meters (330 ft)
- Transmitter coordinates: 41°30′54.00″N 84°39′43.00″W

Links
- Public license information: Public file; LMS
- Webcast: Listen Live
- Website: wlzzradio.com

WLZZ (104.5 FM, "Z104") is a radio station broadcasting a country format. Licensed to Montpelier, Ohio, United States, the station is currently owned by Swick Broadcasting Company .

== History ==
The station went on the air as WYDF on 1991-02-01. On 1991-04-15, the station changed its call sign to the current WLZZ.

On December 28, 2018, WLZZ changed their format from country to classic rock, branded as "Z104".

In August 2019, WLZZ changed their format from classic rock back to country, branded as "Superstar Country Z-104".
