= WSDE =

- Cobleskill, New York; United States
- Frequency: 1190 kHz
- Branding: Lite 94.3 FM & 1190 AM

Programming
- Format: Soft oldies - Adult standards - MOR
- Affiliations: ABC News Radio; Genesis Communications Network; USA Radio Network; Westwood One; New York Yankees Radio Network; NASCAR radio network

Ownership
- Owner: Ed Sherlock; (Schoharie Broadcasting, LLC)

History
- First air date: 1981 (as WSCM)
- Former call signs: WSCM (1980–1995); WDCS (1995–1996); WLAL (1996–1998); WXBH (1998–2004)
- Call sign meaning: Stephan, Douglas E. (former owner)

Technical information
- Licensing authority: FCC
- Facility ID: 4002
- Class: D
- Power: 1,000 watts day 20 watts night
- Transmitter coordinates: 42°41′26″N 74°26′40″W
- Translators: 94.3 W232CE (Cobleskill); 100.1 W261DP (Duanesburg)

Links
- Public license information: Public file; LMS
- Webcast: Listen Live
- Website: 1190wsde.com

WSDE (1190 AM) is a commercial radio station licensed to Cobleskill, New York. It is owned by Ed Sherlock's Schoharie Broadcasting LLC. The station carries the "America's Best Music" format from Westwood One, featuring Soft Oldies, Adult Standards and MOR music.

The station also broadcasts New York Yankees baseball and NASCAR motor racing. World and national news comes from ABC News Radio.

WSDE by day is powered at 1,000 watts. But because AM 1190 is a clear channel frequency, at night it must reduce power to 20 watts to avoid interfering with other stations. Programming is also heard on FM translator station W232CE at 94.3 MHz in Cobleskill and on W261DP at 100.1 MHz in Duanesburg. The translator's dial position is included in the moniker "Lite 94.3 FM and 1190 AM."

== History ==
The station went on the air as WSCM on December 8, 1980. On August 12, 1995, the station changed its call sign to WDCS; the station next changed calls on October 4, 1996, to WLAL; another callsign change occurred on August 28, 1998, when WLAL became WXBH; finally, on July 13, 2004, the station adopted the current WSDE.

The call sign WSDE comes from the initials of its former owner, syndicated radio personality Doug Stephan. The "S" stands for Stephan, the "D" for Doug and the "E" for his middle initial. Stephan's company bought the station in 2004. WSDE carries his news and talk morning show, followed by "America's Best Music."
