= Robbie Irons =

Canadian ice hockey player

- Born: November 19, 1946 (age 79) Toronto, Ontario, Canada
- Height: 5 ft 8 in (173 cm)
- Weight: 150 lb (68 kg; 10 st 10 lb)
- Position: Goaltender
- Caught: Left
- Played for: St. Louis Blues
- Playing career: 1967–1981

Robert Richard Irons (born November 19, 1946) is a retired Canadian ice hockey goaltender. His lone National Hockey League appearance came with the St. Louis Blues during the 1968–69 season, while the majority of his career, spanning from 1967 to 1981, was spent playing in the International Hockey League.

== Playing career ==
Born in Toronto, Ontario, Irons made a single NHL appearance with the St. Louis Blues during the 1968–69 season, playing just 2 minutes and 59 seconds in a game on November 13, 1968. He was pressed into action when starting goalie Glenn Hall was ejected and Jacques Plante was not yet ready to enter, covering the net until Plante could step in.

Irons once held, alongside Christian Soucy, the NHL record for the fewest career minutes played by a goaltender. That mark was broken on December 31, 2016, when Jorge Alves appeared for just 7.6 seconds in his lone NHL game.

Irons spent 11 seasons competing in the IHL as the goaltender for the Fort Wayne Komets. Throughout his tenure with the team, he established himself as one of the franchise's most reliable and celebrated players, earning six selections to the IHL All-Star team. In honour of his achievements and lasting influence on the organization, the Komets retired his jersey number 30.

== Broadcasting career ==
Following his playing career, Irons became an analyst alongside the Komets' play-by-play broadcaster, Bob Chase. The duo worked together for 33 years, remaining a staple of Komets coverage until Chase died in 2016.

== Career statistics ==
=== Regular season and playoffs ===
			Regular season									Playoffs
Season	Team	League	GP	W	L	T	MIN	GA	SO	GAA	SV%	GP	W	L	MIN	GA	SO	GAA	SV%
1964–65	Etobicoke Indians	MetJBHL	—	—	—	—	—	—	—	—	—	—	—	—	—	—	—	—	—
1965–66	Etobicoke Indians	MetJBHL	—	—	—	—	—	—	—	—	—	—	—	—	—	—	—	—	—
1966–67	Kitchener Rangers	OHA	33	—	—	—	1940	95	3	2.94	—	13	—	—	780	49	0	3.77	—
1967–68	Fort Wayne Komets	IHL	43	—	—	—	2398	134	1	3.35	—	5	1	3	262	19	0	4.35	—
1968–69	St. Louis Blues	NHL	1	0	0	0	3	0	0	0.00	1.000	—	—	—	—	—	—	—	—
1968–69	Kansas City Blues	CHL	24	—	—	—	1309	83	0	3.80	—	—	—	—	—	—	—	—	—
1969–70	Kansas City Blues	CHL	30	10	16	4	1800	104	2	3.47	—	—	—	—	—	—	—	—	—
1970–71	Kansas City Blues	CHL	6	—	—	—	360	23	0	3.83	—	—	—	—	—	—	—	—	—
1970–71	Fort Wayne Komets	IHL	31	—	—	—	1811	80	1	2.25	—	4	0	4	240	22	0	5.50	—
1971–72	Fort Wayne Komets	IHL	21	—	—	—	1251	83	1	4.00	—	—	—	—	—	—	—	—	—
1972–73	Fort Wayne Komets	IHL	46	—	—	—	2737	132	2	2.89	—	1	1	0	60	0	1	0.00	—
1973–74	Fort Wayne Komets	IHL	47	—	—	—	2701	148	2	3.29	—	—	—	—	—	—	—	—	—
1974–75	Fort Wayne Komets	IHL	46	—	—	—	2713	146	2	3.27	—	—	—	—	—	—	—	—	—
1975–76	Fort Wayne Komets	IHL	63	—	—	—	3321	199	1	3.60	—	9	5	4	530	39	0	5.44	—
1976–77	Fort Wayne Komets	IHL	41	—	—	—	2248	141	1	3.70	—	—	—	—	—	—	—	—	—
1977–78	Fort Wayne Komets	IHL	39	—	—	—	2152	129	0	3.60	—	7	—	—	319	20	0	3.76	—
1978–79	Fort Wayne Komets	IHL	54	—	—	—	2490	193	1	3.90	—	13	7	6	780	56	0	4.29	—
1979–80	Fort Wayne Komets	IHL	41	—	—	—	2188	147	1	4.03	—	14	—	—	806	44	1	3.28	—
1980–81	Fort Wayne Komets	IHL	51	—	—	—	2719	168	0	3.71	—	11	—	—	633	47	0	4.45	—
NHL totals			1	0	0	0	3	0	0	0.00	1.000	—	—	—	—	—	—	—	—

== See also ==
- List of players who played only one game in the NHL
