= WLKI =

Radio station in Angola, Indiana, United States

- Angola, Indiana; United States
- Broadcast area: Northeast Indiana/Northwest Ohio/South-central Michigan
- Frequency: 100.3 MHz (HD Radio)
- Branding: 100.3 WLKI

Programming
- Format: Adult contemporary
- Subchannels: HD2: U-Rock 101.3 (Classic rock); HD3: 92.7 The Light (Contemporary Christian)
- Affiliations: Fox News Radio

Ownership
- Owner: Stephen Swick dba Swick Broadcasting Corporation
- Sister stations: WBET, WBET-FM, WLZZ, WTHD

History
- First air date: November 7, 1969 (56 years ago) (as WAFM)
- Former call signs: WAFM (1969–1974)

Technical information
- Licensing authority: FCC
- Facility ID: 36273
- Class: A
- ERP: 4,000 watts
- HAAT: 120 meters (390 ft)
- Transmitter coordinates: 41.681°N 85.001°W
- Translators: HD2: 101.3 W267BE (Angola); HD3: 92.7 W224BY (Angola)

Links
- Public license information: Public file; LMS
- Webcast: Listen live HD2: Listen live HD3: Listen live
- Website: wlki.com urockangola.com (HD2); 927thelight.com (HD3)

WLKI (100.3 FM) is an American radio station licensed to and based in Angola, Indiana, and serving portions of northeastern Indiana, northwestern Ohio, and south-central Michigan. Owned by Coldwater, Michigan businessman Stephen Swick, the station airs a hybrid adult contemporary/Hot AC music format branded as FM's Best.

WLKI's primary service area includes the cities of Angola, Fremont, Butler, Clear Lake, Howe, LaGrange, Orland, and Waterloo in Indiana, Coldwater, Bronson and Camden in Michigan, and Edon, Ohio. Its signal reaches portions of DeKalb County, and can be heard as far away as Hudson, Michigan although reception farther east is impeded by co-channel WNIC in the Detroit area.

== History ==
The station began broadcasting on November 7, 1969 at 100.1 MHz, and became WLKI on July 15, 1974. The station first had a Top 40/CHR format until 1992, when its format was downgraded towards hot adult contemporary. The station flipped to normal adult contemporary during the 2000s. WLKI was owned by Thomas R. Andrews owner of Lake Cities Broadcasting Corporation until April 2008, when it was sold to Stephen Swick (under the corporate name Swick Broadcasting Corporation) for $3.8 million along with sister stations WTHD in LaGrange, Indiana and WLZZ in Montpelier, Ohio (both country-formatted), and sports WBET/oldies WBET-FM in Sturgis, Michigan.

== Programming ==
The WLKI airstaff includes Andy St. John in the mornings and afternoons, mid-days with Jeremy Robinson and nights with Randi Douglas.

== HD Radio ==
In November, 2009, WLKI began broadcasting in HD, allowing Swick the opportunity to place two additional signals into the Angola area. The former 92.5 translator (W223AM) in Bronson, Michigan, and 99.5 translator (W258AO) in Hillsdale, Michigan, were both purchased by Swick, and moved to the WLKI tower site, with the former becoming 92.7 (W224BY Angola, Indiana), and the latter becoming 101.3 (W267BE Angola, Indiana). 92.7 is now rebroadcasting WLKI-HD3's Christmas music format. On December 31, 2009, 101.3 became the home of "U-Rock 101.3", which is also broadcast on WLKI-HD2.

On November 1, 2021, WLKI-HD3 dropped its "Fox Sports Angola" sports format and began stunting with Christmas music as "92.7 The Christmas Station'. On December 26, 2021, WLKI-HD3 flipped to Hot-AC as "Hot FM 92.7", with the first song being "You Need to Calm Down" by Taylor Swift"

On December 29, 2025, WLKI-HD3 changed their format from Top 40/CHR to contemporary Christian, branded as "92.7 The Light".
