= Back Home Again in Indiana =

1917 song

"(Back Home Again in) Indiana"
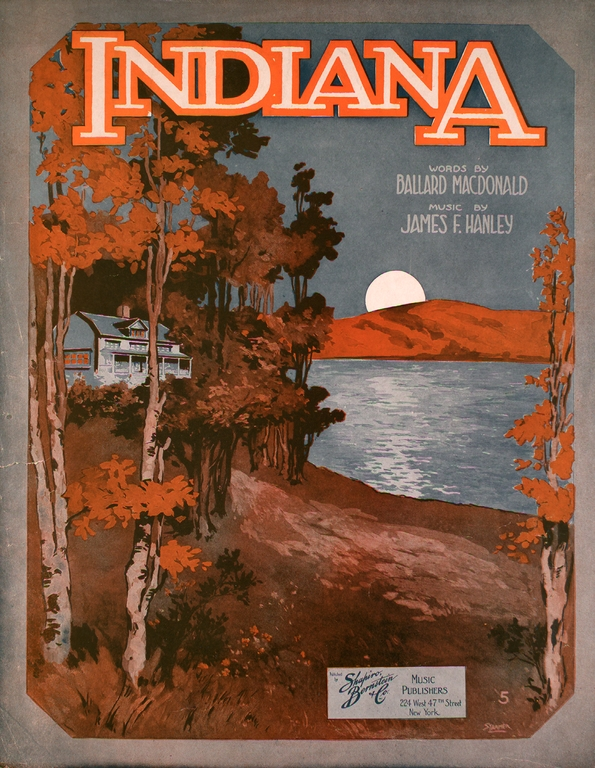
- 1917 sheet music cover

Composition
- Published: January 1917 by Shapiro, Bernstein & Co.
- Genre: jazz/Dixieland
- Songwriters: Ballard MacDonald and James F. Hanley

Audio sample
- Performed by the Homestead Trio, released by Edison Records: file; help

"(Back Home Again in) Indiana" is a song composed by James F. Hanley with lyrics by Ballard MacDonald that was published in January 1917.

== An Indiana signature ==
The tune was published as a Tin Pan Alley pop song by the New York publishing firm Shapiro, Bernstein & Co. It contains a musical quotation from an earlier Tin Pan Alley popular song, "On the Banks of the Wabash, Far Away," and used several evocative words and phrases from the earlier song's lyrics including "candlelight," "moonlight," "fields," "new-mown hay," "sycamores," and "Wabash".

Since 1946, the chorus of "Back Home Again in Indiana" has been performed during pre-race ceremonies before the Indianapolis 500. From 1947 until 2020, thousands of multicolored balloons would be released from an infield tent during the song, until the practice was halted citing environmental concerns. From 1972 to 2014, the song was performed most often by Jim Nabors. He admitted to having the song's lyrics written on his hand during his inaugural performance, and occasionally his versions altered several of the words. The vocals are supported by the Purdue All-American Marching Band. In 2014, Nabors performed the song for the final time after announcing his retirement earlier that year, saying: "You know, there's a time in life when you have to move on. I'll be 84 this year. I just figured it was time ... This is really the highlight of my year to come here. It's very sad for me, but nevertheless there's something inside of me that tells me when it's time to go."

After Nabors retired, the honor of singing the song was done on a rotating basis (which had also been the case prior to Nabors becoming the regular singer) in 2015 and 2016. A cappella group Straight No Chaser performed in 2015 and the Spring 2014 winner of The Voice Josh Kaufman accompanied by the Indianapolis Children's Choir performed in 2016. The Speedway has returned to a standard singer starting in 2017, with Jim Cornelison doing it for ten runnings as of the 2026 race.

The song was also parodied in 1988 as "I Spent the War in Indiana". It made fun of that year's Republican Vice Presidential nominee and Indiana native Dan Quayle's military service in the Indiana National Guard during the Vietnam War, allowing him to avoid deployment to Vietnam.

== A jazz standard ==
Columbia 78 by the Original Dixieland Jass Band, 1917

In 1917 it was one of the current pop tunes selected by Columbia Records to be recorded by the Original Dixieland Jass Band, (ODJB), who released it as a 78 with "Darktown Strutters' Ball". This lively instrumental version by the ODJB was one of the earliest jazz records issued and sold well. The tune became a jazz standard. For years, Louis Armstrong and his All Stars would open every public performance with the number.

Its chord changes undergird the Charlie Parker/Miles Davis composition "Donna Lee", one of jazz's best known contrafacts, a composition that lays a new melody over an existing harmonic structure. Lesser known contrafacts of "Indiana" include Fats Navarro's "Ice Freezes Red" and Lennie Tristano's "Ju-Ju".

In 1934, Joe Young, Jean Schwartz, and Joe Ager wrote "In a Little Red Barn (On a Farm Down in Indiana)", which not only incorporated all the same key words and phrases above, but whose chorus had the same harmonic structure as "Indiana". In this respect it was a contrafact of the latter.

== Cover versions ==
- Original Dixieland Jazz Band, 1917
- Eddie Condon with Frank Teschemacher and Gene Krupa, 1928
- Red Nichols, 1929
- Casa Loma Orchestra, 1932
- Hoosier Hot Shots, 1937
- Chu Berry with Hot Lips Page, 1937
- Lester Young with Nat King Cole, 1942
- Lester Young with Count Basie, 1944
- Don Byas with Slam Stewart, 1945
- Bud Powell, 1947
- Louis Armstrong, An Evening with Louis Armstrong at Pasadena Civic Auditorium, 1951
- Charlie Parker, Chet Baker, and Sonny Criss, Inglewood Jam, 1952
- Chet Atkins, 'A Session With Chet Atkins', 1954
- Dave Brubeck, Interchanges ‘54
- Bobby Darin and Johnny Mercer, Two of a Kind, 1961
- Richard "Groove" Holmes, On Basie's Bandstand, 1966
- Joe Venuti and Zoot Sims, Joe and Zoot, 1973
- Glen Campbell, live on The Tonight Show, 1973
- Bonnie Koloc, Wild and Recluse, 1978
- Dick Wellstood with Kenny Davern, The Blue Three at Hanratty's, 1981
- Straight No Chaser, The New Old Fashioned, 2015
- Jerry Garcia, “Garcia”, 1974
- Rosemary Clooney, Interview Jazz Collection Vol. 1, 1996

== See also ==
- List of pre-1920 jazz standards
