= WFWI =

Simulcasting WOWO Fort Wayne
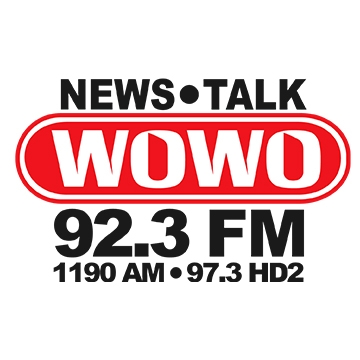
- Fort Wayne, Indiana; United States
- Broadcast area: Fort Wayne metropolitan area
- Frequency: 92.3 MHz
- Branding: News/Talk WOWO 92.3 FM 1190 AM

Programming
- Format: Talk radio
- Affiliations: Fox News Radio; Premiere Networks; Westwood One; Fort Wayne Komets; WPTA

Ownership
- Owner: Federated Media; (Pathfinder Communications Corporation)
- Sister stations: WBYR; WKJG; WMEE; WQHK-FM; WOWO

History
- First air date: March 1993
- Former call signs: WFWI (1993–2012); WOWO-FM (2012–2015)
- Call sign meaning: Fort Wayne, Indiana

Technical information
- Licensing authority: FCC
- Facility ID: 18662
- Class: A
- ERP: 2,200 watts
- HAAT: 166 meters (545 ft)
- Transmitter coordinates: 41°6′39.2″N 85°11′43.9″W

Links
- Public license information: Public file; LMS
- Webcast: Listen live
- Website: www.wowo.com

WFWI (92.3 FM) is a radio station located in Fort Wayne, Indiana, with a talk radio format, simulcasting WOWO (1190 AM). The station is owned by Federated Media.

== History ==
WFWI began broadcasting in March 1993 with an adult contemporary format under the ownership of Russ Oasis and Steve Avellone, with Tony Coles as the first program director.

In early 1994, Oasis and Coles then changed the format to 1970s hits; shortly after, Coles left Fort Wayne for New York's WLTW and production director Keith Harris took over as WFWI's program director. Under Harris's tenure, the format was shifted to classic hits. On January 6, 1995, the Bob & Tom Show became the station's morning show.

In 1997, Federated Media purchased WFWI from Edgewater Radio. Following the sale, Federated Media shifted WFWI from a classic hits format to a classic rock format under the name "92.3 The Fort".

On March 15, 2012, Federated Media announced that 92.3 would begin simulcasting WOWO on April 1. The change was then moved up a few days to the 28th, and at Noon on that day, following a goodbye show for The Fort from the DJs of the station (who had previously announced that they and the format would move to an online webstream at TheFortRocks.com; the show ended with "Happy Trails" by Van Halen), 92.3 began simulcasting WOWO as "News/Talk WOWO, AM 1190 and FM 92.3". The same day, the callsign was changed to WOWO-FM.

Logo as "Big 92.3"

On November 4, 2015, WOWO-FM changed their call letters back to WFWI. On December 14, WOWO began simulcasting on translator W298BJ (107.5 FM); the simulcast would move to that frequency full-time on January 1, 2016. On that date, WFWI began stunting with two-minute clips of classic rock songs, with liners promoting to go to WePromiseSomethingBig.com, which had a timer counting down to 6 a.m. on January 4. At that time, WFWI flipped to a classic hits/adult hits hybrid as "Big 92.3, Fort Wayne's Greatest Hits".

On May 1, 2023, WFWI dropped the classic hits format and returned to simulcasting WOWO.
