= WMEE =

- Fort Wayne, Indiana; United States
- Broadcast area: Fort Wayne metro
- Frequency: 97.3 MHz (HD Radio)
- Branding: 97.3 WMEE

Programming
- Format: Hot adult contemporary
- Subchannels: HD1: WMEE analog; HD2: Talk (WOWO simulcast)

Ownership
- Owner: Federated Media; (Pathfinder Communications Corporation)
- Sister stations: WBYR; WFWI; WKJG; WOWO; WQHK-FM

History
- First air date: February 5, 1965
- Former call signs: WKJG-FM (1965–71); WMEF (1971–79)
- Call sign meaning: Originally used on the former—and current—WKJG from 1971 to 1979; "WMEE" was cited as easier to pronounce on-air as opposed to "WKJG"

Technical information
- Licensing authority: FCC
- Facility ID: 51726
- Class: B
- ERP: 26,000 watts
- HAAT: 210 meters (690 ft)
- Transmitter coordinates: 41.112°N 85.195°W

Links
- Public license information: Public file; LMS
- Webcast: Listen live; Listen live (via iHeartRadio)
- Website: www.wmee.com

WMEE (97.3 FM) is a radio station broadcasting a hot adult contemporary format. The station serves the Fort Wayne, Indiana area. The station is currently owned by Federated Media.

== History ==
The WMEE calls originated in 1971 at 1380 kHz on the AM dial as a Top 40 outlet before switching to 97.3 FM in 1979. The 97.3 FM frequency had previously programmed beautiful music as WMEF (and originally as WKJG-FM). The station originally used legendary and iconic nicknames and monikers throughout the years, including "The New Magic 97 FM, WMEE" (the first branding and moniker used when WMEE moved from AM to FM on September 21, 1979), "The All New, All Hit 97 FM, WMEE", "Power 97 FM, WMEE", "Mix 97 FM, WMEE", and currently "97.3 WMEE". From September 1979 until September 1994, WMEE-FM was Fort Wayne's longtime CHR leader and originally had an effective radiated power of 48,000 watts. In September 1994, WMEE dropped its CHR format and flipped to its current hot adult contemporary format.

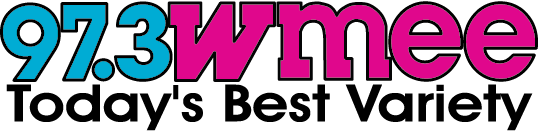
Former logo

== HD Radio ==
WMEE is licensed to broadcast in the HD Radio (hybrid) format:

- 97.3 HD1 is a digital simulcast of the traditional WMEE (analog) signal.
- 97.3 HD2 is a simulcast of News Talk WOWO.

== Notable WMEE-FM alumni ==
- Brooklynne Beatty
- Renee Wilkins
- Dan Scheie
- "Boomer"
- David Scheie
- Jameson "Jimmy Ignatius" Knight
- Charly Butcher (deceased)
- Anthony "Tony" Richards
- Zack Skyler
- Gregg "Chuck Brodie" Cassidy
- J.C. Baker
- Jennifer Carr
- Gary "Adam Cook" Wheeler
- Chuck "Shotgun Lenny Harrison" Martin
- Captain Chris
- Steven "Magic Steve" Christian
- Jeffrey "Jeff" Davis
- Robert Elliott (deceased)
- Chad Hunt
- Scott Howard
- Antonette "Toni" Kayumi
- Dean McNeil
- Craig Morrison & Samantha Adams
- Brady Garrison
- Harry Lyles
- Kevin Meek
- Trina Neeley
- Richard Nunez
- Paul Poteet
- Douglas "Doug B." Pritchett
- Diane Shannon
- Bert Sherwood
- J.D. Spangler
- Scott Tsuleff
- Chris Tyler
- Christopher "Chris Coyote" Underwood
- Casey "Shaggy" Kasem
- Shadoe Stevens

== Notable WMEE AM alumni ==
- Patrick "Big Pat" Barry
- Donnie Chevillet
- Danny Collins
- Billy Donovan
- Rick Hughes
- Chris Kane
- Casey "Shaggy" Kasem
- Chuck "Shotgun Lenny Harrison" Martin
- Bobby Lee
- Victor Locke - Now in Durango, CO, Owner of victorlocke.com
- Gary "LJ The DJ" Lockwood
- Jack Martin
- Jack Maurer - Now Associate Broker, Real Living Ness Bros. Real Estate & Auction Co.
- Mark Rivers
- James "Fast Jimi" Roberts
- Tom Roberts
- Steve Shine
- Michael St. John
- Doug Steele
- Vince Turner
- Mike Waite
- Tom Williams
