= WBYT =

- Elkhart, Indiana; United States
- Broadcast area: South Bend, Indiana
- Frequency: 100.7 MHz
- Branding: B100

Programming
- Format: Country music
- Affiliations: Compass Media Networks; United Stations Radio Networks; Westwood One

Ownership
- Owner: Federated Media; (Pathfinder Communications Corporation)
- Sister stations: WAOR; WRBR-FM; WTRC; WTRC-FM

History
- First air date: April 1, 1947
- Former call signs: WTRC-FM (1947–1969); WFIM (1969–1974); WYEZ (1974–1991); WLTA (1991–1994)

Technical information
- Licensing authority: FCC
- Facility ID: 51723
- Class: B
- ERP: 15,000 watts
- HAAT: 277 meters (909 ft)
- Transmitter coordinates: 41°36′58.1″N 86°11′38″W

Links
- Public license information: Public file; LMS
- Webcast: Listen live
- Website: www.b100.com

WBYT (100.7 FM) is a radio station licensed to Elkhart, Indiana, United States, and serving the Michiana region. The station airs a country music format and is owned by Federated Media, via licensee Pathfinder Communications Corporation.

WBYT is licensed to broadcast in the HD (hybrid) format.

== History ==
The station began broadcasting April 1, 1947, holding the call sign WTRC-FM, and was a sister station to 1340 WTRC. In 1969, the station's call sign was changed to WFIM. WFIM aired an easy listening format. In 1974, the station's call sign was changed to WYEZ, with the station retaining an easy listening format. The station continued airing an easy listening format through the 1980s. On December 13, 1991, the station's call sign was changed to WLTA. The station aired a soft AC format. In June 1994, the station adopted a country music format, branded "B-100", and its call sign was changed to WBYT.
