= Richard Nunez (artist) =

American painter

Richard L Nunez
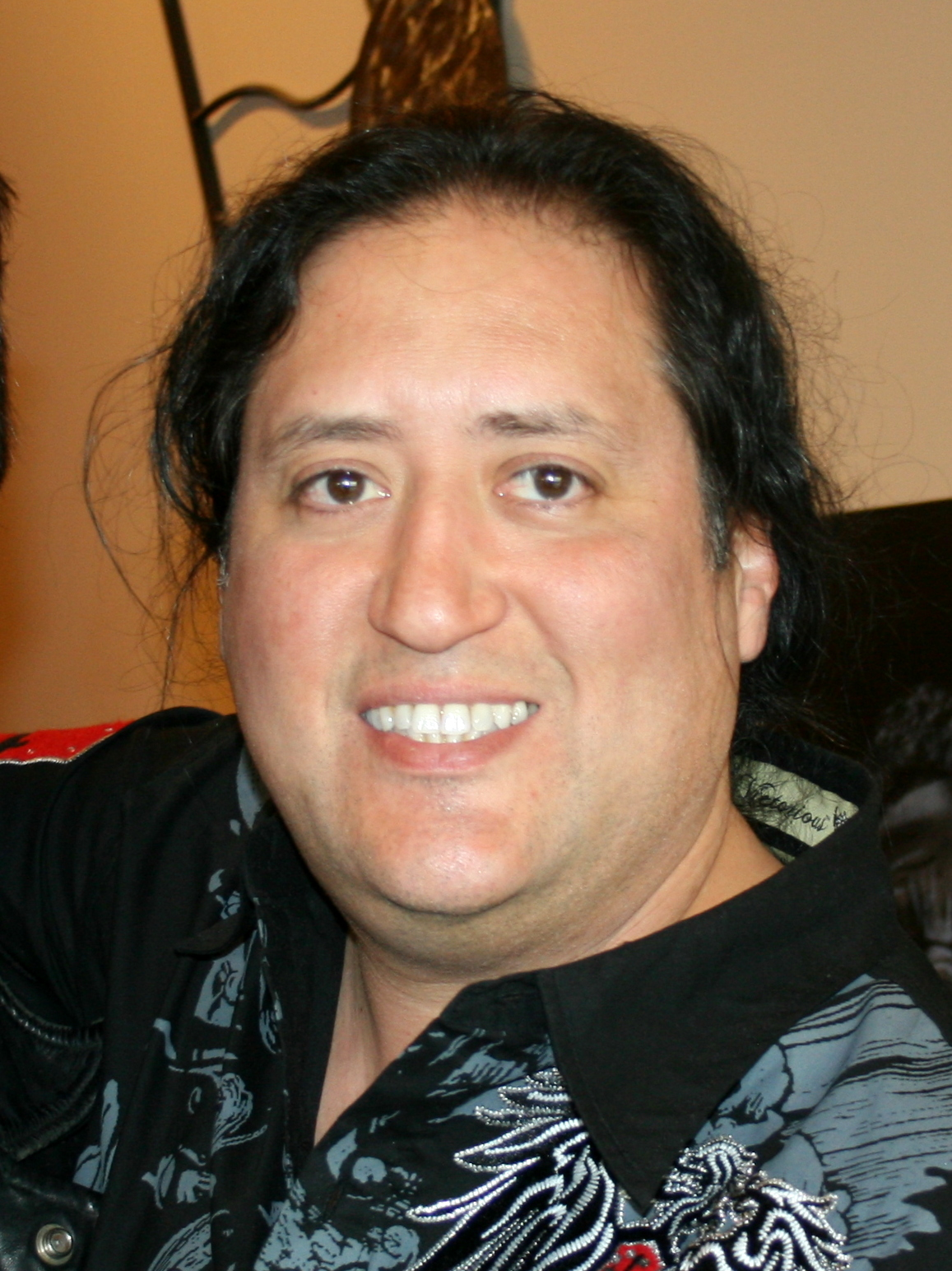
- Artist Nunez painting live, 2010
- Born: March 23, 1961 (age 65); Fort Wayne, Indiana
- Education: Self-taught
- Website: artistnunez.com

Richard Nunez (born March 23, 1961) is an American painter and artist based out of the Dallas–Fort Worth Metroplex in Texas of Mescalero Apache descent. Nunez paints primarily acrylic on canvas.

== Early life and education ==
Richard Nunez was born in 1961 in Fort Wayne, Indiana, to Esther and Henry Nunez, both of Apache Indian descent, although he did not find out about his heritage until 2004.

Nunez attended Southside High School in Fort Wayne, graduating in 1979. During high school, Nunez worked at WMEE radio station from 1978 to 1979 as a maintenance engineer.

== Career ==
At the urging of his first wife, Nunez left the radio station. He spent the next 20 years working in various jobs, including a dishwasher in a Mexican restaurant, grocery store bagger, salesman at Home Depot and Montgomery Wards, forklift operator, bartender, standup comic and singer.

In 1993, Nunez decided to move to Phoenix, Arizona. During the trip from Indiana to Arizona, his car broke down in Dallas. Without the funds to pay for repairs, Nunez was taken in by an uncle and never left. Nunez then spent the next 13 years working in the hospitality industry as a bartender, waiter and head trainer. He eventually became the general manager for a wine bar in Highland Village, TX, 30 minutes outside of Dallas.

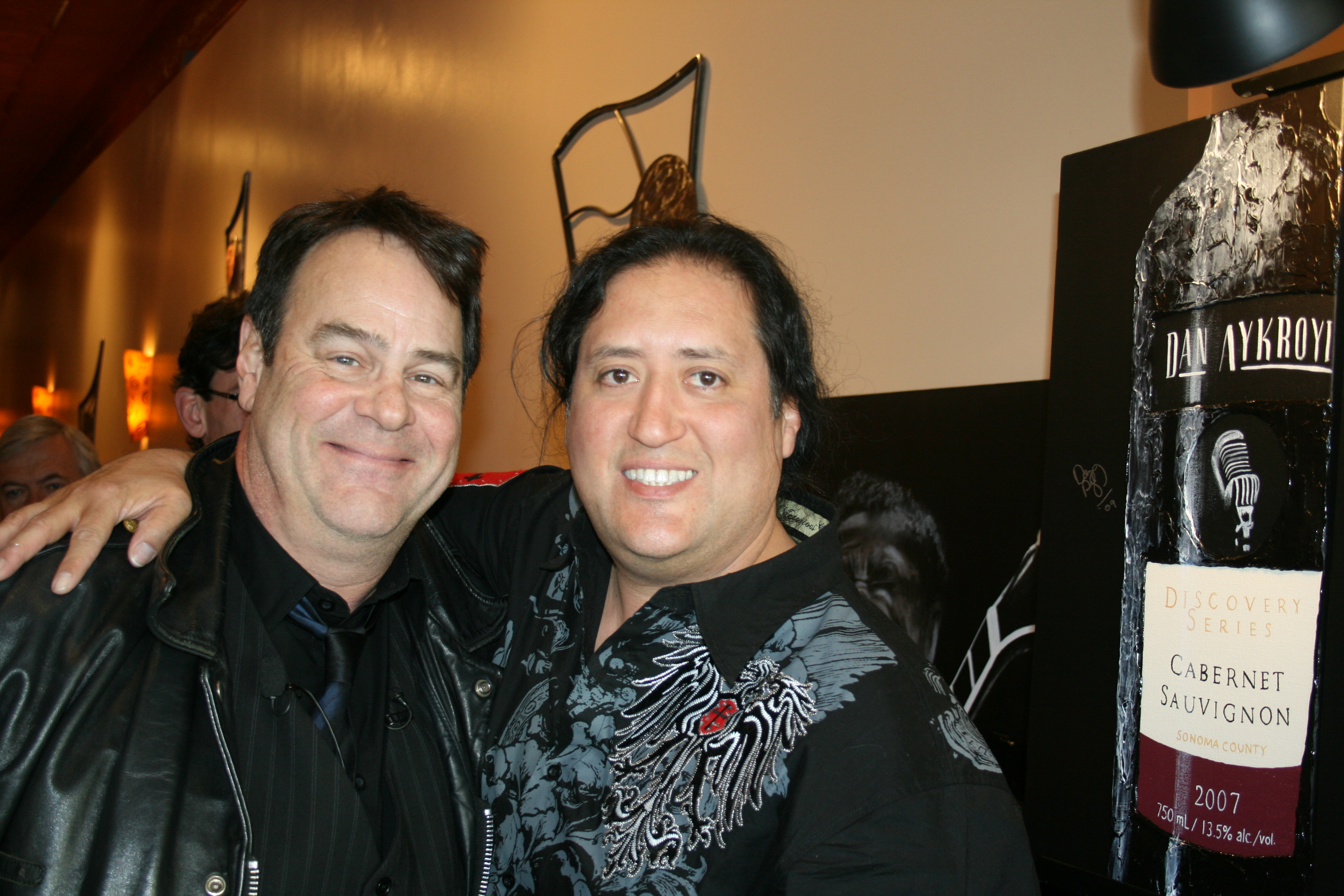
Richard Nunez promoting Dan Aykroyd's wine label back in February 2009.

Finally, in 2005, at the age of 45, Nunez was ready to pursue art full-time. He founded a company, NINA Art, to showcase his work.

== Personal life ==
Nunez has been married three times. He and his first wife have two children. His third wife, Nancy Nunez, is the art director of Nunez's company NINA Art.
