= WAOR =

- Ligonier, Indiana; United States
- Broadcast area: Elkhart-Goshen, Indiana
- Frequency: 102.7 MHz
- Branding: Froggy 102.7

Programming
- Format: Hot adult contemporary
- Affiliations: Westwood One

Ownership
- Owner: Federated Media; (Pathfinder Communications Corporation)
- Sister stations: WBYT, WRBR-FM, WTRC, WTRC-FM

History
- First air date: 1991 (as WLNB)
- Former call signs: WLNB (1990–2001); WGSN (2001–2002); WLEG (2002–2014)

Technical information
- Licensing authority: FCC
- Facility ID: 63773
- Class: A
- ERP: 2,000 watts
- HAAT: 122 meters (400 ft)
- Transmitter coordinates: 41°27′32.2″N 85°44′43″W

Links
- Public license information: Public file; LMS
- Webcast: Listen live
- Website: www.froggy1027.com

WAOR (102.7 FM, "Froggy 102.7") is a hot adult contemporary formatted radio station serving listeners in northern Indiana and southwestern lower Michigan, in the United States. It is owned by Federated Media, and operates with 2,000 watts. The station's transmitter is located in Ligonier, Indiana, and its studios are located in the Federated Media Mediaplex in downtown Elkhart, Indiana.

== History ==
After a stint as "Cow Country", "Froggy 102.7" went on the air in 2002 with a hybrid AC format. The station played standard hot AC artists, but also marketed itself as having the most variety; a typical hour's playlist would include several current pop hits, as well as disco, country, classic R&B, and classic rock.

The station was known for its involvement with the local community; the airstaff averaged nearly 200 personal appearances a year, and did a considerable amount of community-oriented charity work. The station's signature event was a Polar Plunge promotion called The Leprechaun Leap, which raised money for United Cancer Services of Elkhart County.

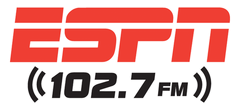
Logo as an ESPN Radio affiliate

After a successful 10-year run as a Froggy-branded station, WLEG segued to a sports talk format branded as "102.7 The Fan" on Monday, June 4, 2012, at 9:00 AM EST as part of a series of music-to-sports format changes that occurred across Indiana that day. The last song on "Froggy 102.7" was "Part of Me" by Katy Perry, which was cut off about halfway through by the introductory montage for The Fan. "The Fan" featured numerous syndicated programs from the Fox Sports Radio network, including The Dan Patrick Show.

On April 1, 2014, WLEG became an ESPN Radio affiliate. This change added shows Mike & Mike, The Herd with Colin Cowherd, SVP & Russillo, Dan LeBatard, Sedano and Stink, and Freddie Coleman on weekdays, and various weekend programming on ESPN Radio. On August 14, 2014, WLEG changed its call letters to WAOR.

On August 28, 2017, at 6 am, WAOR changed its format from sports to hot adult contemporary, returning to the "Froggy 102.7" branding.
