= WTRC (AM) =

Radio station in Elkhart, Indiana, United States

- Elkhart, Indiana; United States
- Broadcast area: South Bend metropolitan area
- Frequency: 1340 kHz
- Branding: MNC Nation

Programming
- Format: News/talk
- Affiliations: Compass Media Networks; Fox News Radio; Premiere Networks; Regional Radio Sports Network; Westwood One

Ownership
- Owner: Federated Media; (Pathfinder Communications Corporation)
- Sister stations: WTRC-FM; WAOR; WBYT; WRBR-FM

History
- First air date: 1922
- Former call signs: WJAK (1922–1932)
- Call sign meaning: Truth Radio Corporation (former owner)

Technical information
- Licensing authority: FCC
- Facility ID: 51728
- Class: C
- Power: 1,000 watts unlimited
- Transmitter coordinates: 41°40′28.18″N 85°56′51″W
- Translator: 101.9 W270DK (Elkhart)

Links
- Public license information: Public file; LMS
- Webcast: Listen live
- Website: mncnation.com

WTRC (1340 kHz) is a commercial AM radio station licensed to Elkhart, Indiana, and serving the South Bend metropolitan area. It is owned by Federated Media. The station airs a news/talk radio format and is a Fox News Radio affiliate.

On the air since 1922, WTRC is one of Indiana's oldest radio stations. It has a power of 1,000 watts, and uses a non-directional antenna. The transmitter site is on Indiana Road near the Elkhart River in Elkhart.

WTRC is also heard on a 250 watt FM translator, W270DK on 101.9 MHz.

== History ==
=== WJAK ===
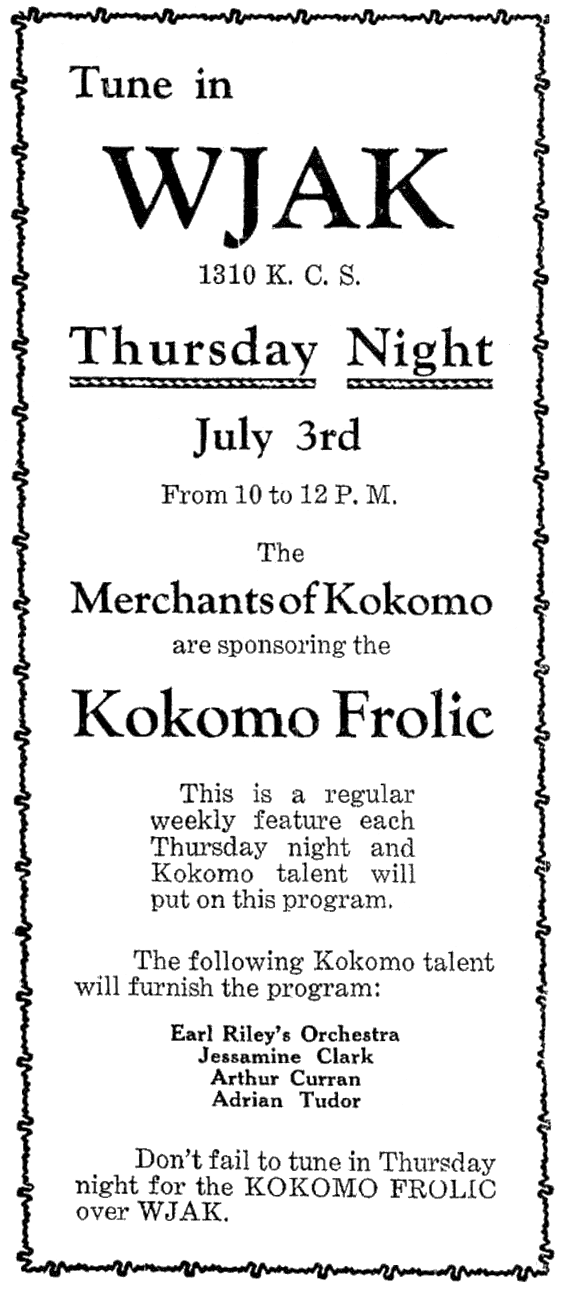
1930 program advertisement.

WTRC's self-reported histories commonly list its start date as November 18, 1931, when the station made its first broadcast in Elkhart. However, government records report that the station actually began broadcasting nine years earlier.

On December 1, 1921, the U.S. Department of Commerce, which regulated radio at this time, adopted a regulation formally establishing a broadcasting station category, which set aside the wavelength of 360 meters (833 kHz) for entertainment broadcasts, and 485 meters (619 kHz) for market and weather reports. On July 28, 1922, a broadcasting station license, with the call letters WJAK, was issued to the White Radio Laboratory (C. L. White) in Stockdale, Ohio, for operation on the 360 meter "entertainment" wavelength. The station's call letters were randomly assigned from a sequential roster of available call signs.

In 1923 the station was briefly deleted, then relicensed to Reverend Clifford L. White of the Church of Christ in Greentown, Indiana, now on 1180 kHz. In early 1926 the station moved to 1531 Washington Street in Kokomo, Indiana, and was owned by J. A. Keutz, who was also the owner and publisher of the Kokomo Tribune. The debut Kokomo broadcast, of a local basketball game, was made on February 5, 1926.

Following the establishment of the Federal Radio Commission (FRC), stations were initially issued a series of temporary authorizations starting on May 3, 1927. In addition, they were informed that if they wanted to continue operating, they needed to file a formal license application by January 15, 1928, as the first step in determining whether they met the new "public interest, convenience, or necessity" standard. On May 25, 1928, the FRC issued General Order 32, which notified 164 stations, including WJAK, that "From an examination of your application for future license it does not find that public interest, convenience, or necessity would be served by granting it." However, the station successfully convinced the commission that it should remain licensed.

On November 11, 1928, with the implementation of the FRC's General Order 40, WJAK was assigned to 1310 kHz with 50 watts, on a timesharing basis with WLBC in Muncie, Indiana. WJAK moved to Marion, Indiana, in February 1929, after being sold to the Marion Broadcasting Company.

In 1931 the station's license was assigned to The Truth Publishing Company, Inc., co-owned with The Elkhart Truth newspaper, and the station moved to Elkhart, Indiana, where it has remained to this day. The debut broadcast at the new location, still as WJAK, was made on November 18, 1931, from the top of the Hotel Elkhart.

=== WTRC ===
On September 2, 1932, the call letters were changed to WTRC, standing for "Truth Radio Corporation".

Due to the distance between Elkhart and Muncie, the requirement to share time with WLBC during daylight hours was eliminated. WTRC's daytime power was increased to 100 watts in 1933. In 1936, daytime power was increased to 250 watts and its nighttime power to 100 watts, and the nighttime timesharing requirement with WLBC was ended, allowing WTRC unlimited hours of operation. In 1939, nighttime power was increased to 250 watts. In March 1941, most stations on 1310 kHz, including WTRC, were moved to 1340 kHz, due to the implementation of the North American Regional Broadcasting Agreement. Through the 1940s, WTRC was Elkhart's only radio station, carrying the programming of the NBC Radio Network.

In early 1945 Truth Publishing filed an application for a companion FM station, which began operating as WTRC-FM in 1948, originally at 100.7 MHz. That station today is co-owned WBYT.

In 1961, WTRC's daytime power was increased to 1,000 watts.

==== Middle of the road and full service ====
In 1966, WTRC was one of the media holdings of The Communicana Group of Indiana.

WTRC aired a middle of the road (MOR) format in the 1970s and 1980s. In the early 1970s, the station aired a MOR format during the day and a rock format at night. By the early 1990s, the station was airing a full service-adult contemporary format. In 1994, it shifted to an all talk format. In 1996, the station adopted an adult standards format. It was branded "The Heartbeat of Elkhart" during this period.

In 2000, the station switched to a full service format, airing news-talk programming during the day and soft adult contemporary music at night. By the end of 2002 talk programming had replaced all music on the station. WTRC was branded "News Radio 1340" during this period. Hosts included Glenn Beck, Sean Hannity, Michael Savage, and The Dolans.

==== Oldies and talk ====
In August 2009, WTRC switched to an oldies format as "Hippie Radio 1340".

In 2010, the station switched back to a talk radio format, as part of a simulcast with 95.3 WTRC-FM, and was branded "Michiana's News Channel". The station carried syndicated hosts such as Glenn Beck, Rush Limbaugh, Sean Hannity, Jason Lewis, and Lars Larson, as well as a local morning show. On May 5, 2014, WTRC reduced its fulltime simulcast of WTRC-FM, focusing on Elkhart through a partnership with sister newspaper The Elkhart Truth, featuring a separate morning show. However, the two stations continued to jointly broadcast most other programming.

==== Standards and soft adult contemporary ====
On February 17, 2017, WTRC fully ended its WTRC-FM simulcast, and changed its format to adult standards, branded as "Frank 1340", honoring popular 1940s, 1950s and 1960s singer Frank Sinatra. WTRC-FM continued its talk programming.

In 2020, WTRC rebranded as "The Hart" and revived the "Heartbeat of Elkhart" slogan. The word "heart" was intentionally misspelled to match the city's name, Elkhart. The station refocused its era to the 1960s, 1970s and 1980s, playing mostly soft oldies; the new branding dropped the reference to Sinatra, who now only had a few songs on the playlist.

==== MNC Nation ====
On April 3, 2023, WTRC changed its format from soft oldies to news/talk, branded as "MNC Nation". The station simulcasts local drive time programming, The O'Reilly Update, Ground Zero with Clyde Lewis, and Coast to Coast AM with WTRC-FM; the two stations otherwise have separate lineups of syndicated programming.

== Translator ==
In December 2018, WTRC began simulcasting on FM translator station W270DK 101.9 MHz.

Broadcast translator for WTRC
Call sign	Frequency	City of license	FID	ERP (W)	HAAT	Transmitter coordinates	FCC info
W270DK	101.9 FM	Elkhart, Indiana	201230	250	106 m (348 ft)	41°40′29.2″N 85°56′51″W	LMS
