= WOWO =

Radio station in Fort Wayne, Indiana

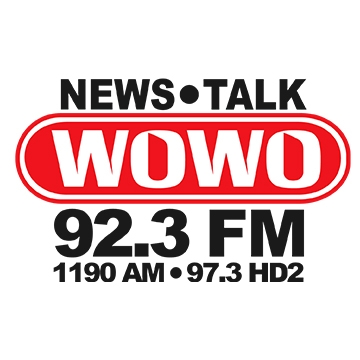
- Fort Wayne, Indiana; United States
- Broadcast area: Fort Wayne metro
- Frequency: 1190 kHz (HD Radio)
- Branding: News/Talk WOWO 92.3 FM 1190 AM

Programming
- Language: English
- Format: Talk radio
- Affiliations: Fox News Radio; Premiere Networks; Westwood One

Ownership
- Owner: Federated Media; (Pathfinder Communications Corporation)
- Sister stations: WBYR; WFWI; WKJG; WMEE; WQHK-FM

History
- First air date: March 31, 1925
- Former frequencies: 1160 kHz (1929–1941)
- Call sign meaning: Requested for its distinctiveness

Technical information
- Licensing authority: FCC
- Facility ID: 28205
- Class: B
- Power: 50,000 watts (day); 9,800 watts (night)
- Transmitter coordinates: 40°59′47.17″N 85°21′5.91″W
- Translator: 107.5 W298BJ (Fort Wayne)
- Repeaters: 92.3 WFWI (Fort Wayne); 97.3 WMEE-HD2 (Fort Wayne)

Links
- Public license information: Public file; LMS
- Webcast: Listen live; Listen live (via iHeartRadio)
- Website: wowo.com

WOWO (1190 AM) is a commercial radio station licensed to Fort Wayne, Indiana, United States, serving the Fort Wayne metropolitan area. Currently owned by Federated Media, WOWO carries a talk format.

WOWO's studios are located at the transmitter site for WKJG on Maples Road in Fort Wayne, while the transmitter is sited in Roanoke. Besides its main analog transmission, WOWO used to broadcast over an in-band on-channel HD Radio signal; although it simulcasts over both analog Fort Wayne translator W298BJ (107.5 FM), WFWI (92.3 FM), and the HD2 digital subchannel of WMEE; and streams online with availability on the iHeartRadio platform. WOWO is one of three primary entry point stations for Fort Wayne in the Emergency Alert System.

This station historically was a clear-channel station with extended nighttime skywave range from 1941 until 1999; it was downgraded to a Class B AM signal after a 1995 ownership transfer briefly put it under common ownership with WLIB in New York City. WOWO was also the first radio station in the world to broadcast a live basketball game, and the first station to be acquired by Westinghouse Electric Corporation subsidiary Westinghouse Broadcasting, which owned the station from 1936 to 1982. WOWO's call letters are usually phonetically pronounced on-air as "Wo-Wo", rhyming with "go-go."

== History ==
=== Early years ===
WOWO was first licensed in 1925 to the Main Auto Supply Co. at 213 West Main Street, and began broadcasting on March 31, 1925, with 500 watts of power on 1320 kHz. The station was put on the air by Chester W. Keen, owner of Main Auto Supply, and studios were located upstairs in the company building. WOWO was the fourth station to be established in Fort Wayne, but because the first two—WFAS, licensed to the United Radio Corporation in 1922, and WDBV, licensed to the Strand Theatre in 1924—had each ceased operations a few months afterwards, it is the second-oldest-surviving, after WGL, which signed on the year before as WHBJ.

At the time of its establishment a majority of new radio stations received call signs from a sequential list maintained by the regulators at the Department of Commerce, but station owners were also permitted to make special requests, and a contemporary report commenting on WOWO's distinctive call letters suggested "The trick call letters, it is believed, will add to the novelty of the plant." By choosing WOWO for easy pronunciation as a two-syllable word, in the station had a call sign that exhibited more brevity than even three-letter versions. Despite this, announcers and disk jockeys on WOWO were originally prohibited from calling the station "Wo-Wo" on the air until the late 1960s, when a contest was introduced to identify songs in which the "woe" sound appeared. The WOWO call sign was later back-filled as a tongue-in-cheek acronym: "Wayne (as in Fort Wayne) Offers Wonderful Opportunities".

In 1927, WOWO was made a pioneer station joining the CBS Radio Network and remained a CBS network affiliate until 1956. In 1928, Keen sold WOWO to Fred Zieg, who also owned WGL. In 1929, Zieg received government approval to move WOWO to 1190 kHz with a power of 10,000 watts and to move WGL over to WOWO's former 1320 kHz. Until WOWO's purchase by Westinghouse in 1936, Zieg managed the advertising sales of both WOWO and WGL through WOWO-WGL Sales Service, Inc.

On July 4, 1929, the building housing WOWO and WGL caught fire. No casualties were reported, and operations were moved to a nearby location; amazingly enough, the station's large pipe organ, a familiar sound on the station, was not damaged in the blaze. Operations were resumed the following day, and the WOWO pipe organ was later relocated to Gospel Temple in Fort Wayne.

In 1930, WOWO was the first radio station in the world to broadcast a live basketball game. It is also considered to be the first station to broadcast live Indiana high school sports events.

In the 1930s, WOWO launched the music program, Hoosier Hop, which by 1932 was popular enough to be airing nationally on CBS. It continued to air into the 1940s. Among the regular performers on Hoosier Hop in 1946 were the country-western group The Down Homers, which at the time included future rock and roll pioneer Bill Haley as a member.

=== Westinghouse purchase ===
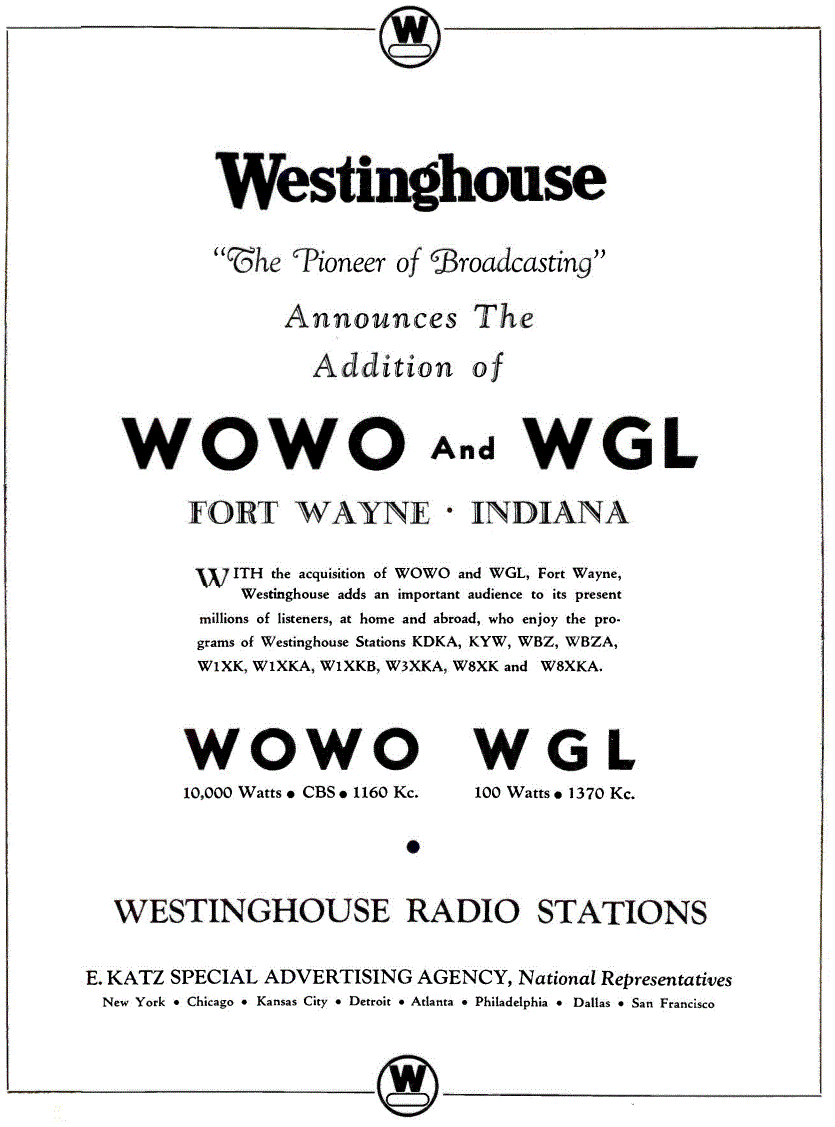
Westinghouse purchased Fort Wayne radio stations WOWO and WGL in 1936.

In August 1936, WOWO, along with another Fort Wayne station, WGL, was acquired by Westinghouse Broadcasting as its first purchase of stations it did not put on the air. WOWO joined original Westinghouse outlets KDKA in Pittsburgh, KYW in Philadelphia, WBZ in Boston and WBZA in Springfield, Massachusetts. Westinghouse built new studios for WOWO at 925 South Harrison Street in Fort Wayne, which were completed on May 1, 1937. On that same date, WOWO joined the NBC Blue Network, while maintaining its CBS network affiliation, as multiple network affiliations were common for Blue affiliates.

On March 29, 1941, Westinghouse completed the Federal Communications Commission (FCC) licensing of WOWO's famous clear-channel signal on AM 1190, making it a Class I-B station, operating around the clock at 50,000 watts. During and after World War II, these clear-channel broadcasts made WOWO a popular radio superstation of sorts throughout the Eastern United States. Although there were other radio stations broadcasting on 1190 kHz during daylight hours, they were required by the FCC either to cease broadcasting at sunset or to reduce their power at night to make way for WOWO's clear-channel signal. For instance, WLIB went on the air in New York in 1942 at AM 1190. It was required to sign-off at sunset time in Fort Wayne, so it would not interfere with WOWO's broadcasts.

In August 1941, the FCC began implementation of a "duopoly" rule, which restricted licensees from operating more than one radio station in a given market. Westinghouse elected to retain WOWO, and sold WGL to the Farnsworth Television and Radio Corporation in 1945. On April 30, 1952, WOWO's studio and offices were relocated to the upper floors of 128 West Washington Boulevard. It was here that the station began its famous "fire-escape" weather forecasts, involving obtaining weather conditions from the fire escape ledge. In 1977, WOWO's studios moved to the fourth floor of the Central Building at 203 West Wayne Street in Fort Wayne, where it would remain for the next fifteen years. When the station relocated to the Central Building, the old fire escape was cut into small pieces, encapsulated in Lucite and distributed as a promotional paper weight.

Programming for the station changed several times. As network programming shifted from radio to television in the 1950s, WOWO's network affiliations were discontinued in 1956. The station switched to playing popular music, along with news, sports and talk. In the 1960s and 70s, WOWO was a popular Top 40 music station, not just in the Fort Wayne area, but after sunset, around the Midwest and Eastern U.S.

=== Agricultural broadcasts ===
With Fort Wayne being roughly equidistant from Chicago, Detroit, and Cincinnati, clear-channel WOWO competed with WLS, WJR, and WLW for the agricultural market. Farmers would have the radio turned on in the milking parlor. WOWO executives claimed it relaxed the cows and produced more milk. In an era when live music was featured on radio stations, WOWO's own "Nancy Lee and the Hilltoppers" proved popular with rural audiences, and eventually WLS, WJR and WLW surrendered the rural audience to concentrate on their urban audiences, leaving WOWO unchallenged for the rural market. Some Midwesterners who had listened to WOWO in their youth continued to pick the station up when they retired to Florida and other warm-weather states in the east.

Nancy Lee and the Hilltoppers' "Little Red Barn" was used as a theme song for Bob Sievers' daily show. When recorded music became the norm for the station, WOWO featured a live show on Saturdays called "Little Red Barn" with Nancy Lee and the Hilltoppers. Nancy Lee was the wife of Sam DeVincent, music librarian for the station.

=== Westinghouse sells WOWO ===
In 1982, Westinghouse sold WOWO to the Wayne Broadcasting Corporation. Despite the sale, WOWO still uses the distinctive Group W typeface for the call letters in its white on PF-152 red logo. In 1994, the station was bought by Inner City Broadcasting, based in New York. Inner City paid $2.3 million for WOWO and its sister station in Huntington, 102.9 WOWO-FM (now WJCI). In 1997, Inner City sold WOWO to its current owner, Federated Media.

In the 1980s, music listening shifted to FM and WOWO saw its ratings as a Top 40 station fall. At 7:30 a.m. on December 16, 1988, WOWO switched to a 1950s-thru-70s oldies format. In 1992 the format changed to full service adult contemporary, and then in 1996, the station switched to a news-talk format which remains to this day.

=== WOWO as a clear-channel station ===
From 1941 to 1995, WOWO was well-known, in both Indiana and areas to the east, as a clear-channel AM station. WOWO broadcast with 50,000 watts of power both during daylight and nighttime hours. From sunset to sunrise, WOWO's 3 tower in-line directional antenna was configured to protect the other Class I-B stations in the U.S., KEX in Portland, Oregon. The nighttime broadcasts were branded as WOWO's Nighttime Skywave Service, the "Voice of a Thousand Main Streets." During the 1970s, the station's hourly legal identification (required by the FCC) stated: Broadcasting in 50,000 watts on AM 1190, WOWO, Fort Wayne, Group W, Westinghouse Broadcasting.

Jay Gould spoke to many community organizations, relating the history of WOWO. Initially, the leading station in Detroit (WJR), Chicago (WLS), and Cincinnati (WLW) all competed for farmer listeners with agricultural reports. WOWO, almost equidistant between those three stations eventually captured that demographic, with the other three stations focusing on their urban and suburban areas. This benefited WOWO as national advertisers saw WOWO as a regional station that would reach well into the backyards of those larger metropolises.

WOWO's clear-channel license permitted WOWO's radio personalities to gain some degree of fame throughout the eastern United States and Canada. They included Bob Sievers, the station's farm director, commentator, folk-philosopher and morning man. Sievers, who was on the station for over 50 years (until 1987) was a major Fort Wayne celebrity and was inducted into National Radio Hall of Fame in 2017. Also heard was Jay Gould, News Director Dugan Fry, meteorologist Earl Finckle, the "In a Little Red Barn (on a farm down in Indiana)" de facto theme song of WOWO, the Penny Pitch charity fund raisers, sports director Bob Chase's Komet Hockey broadcasts, the weather reports from WOWO's personnel on its studio's "world-famous fire escape," and husband-wife hosts of The Little Red Barn Show, music director Sam DeVincent and wife Nancy of "Nancy Lee and the Hilltoppers", all were listened to by people from the Great Lakes to the United States' East Coast and Eastern Canada. Other memorable on-air personalities include Ron Gregory, Chris Roberts, Jack Underwood and Carol Ford.

WOWO's nighttime skywave service required WLIB in New York City, which also broadcasts at 1190 kHz, to operate during daylight hours only with 10,000 watts of power permitted by FCC. But if WLIB could operate at night, it would become much more valuable to its owner, Inner City Broadcasting. So in 1994, Inner City bought WOWO, even though nearly all its other holdings were radio stations serving African American listeners. Inner City's intention was to reduce WOWO from a Class A to a Class B, giving up its clear-channel status, reducing power to 9,800 watts after sunset. This move permitted WLIB to broadcast around the clock, no longer needing to sign off to protect WOWO's nighttime clear-channel signal. This reduced WOWO's potential audience to a much smaller local region in northern Indiana, northwestern Ohio, and south-central Michigan. Before the power reduction, when WLIB signed off at night, WOWO could often be heard on the speakers in WLIB's studios.

=== 1971 Emergency Broadcast System false alarm ===
On February 20, 1971, NORAD at Cheyenne Mountain in Colorado was ready to broadcast a required weekly test of the Emergency Broadcast System. However, AT&T reported that the United States Air Force accidentally used the wrong tape for the test, and initiated an Emergency Action Notification, normally issued by the Office of Civil Defense or the President. This prompted all stations in the Fort Wayne, Indiana, area by order of the FCC to operate under emergency procedures and feed the broadcast from WOWO through their radios. Bob Sievers was at the microphone at WOWO at the time; Sievers and everyone at the studio had no idea what was going on.

The WOWO recording is used in the song "Cold Call" by American progressive rock band OSI on their release Fire Make Thunder. The song that played before the EBS was "Doesn't Somebody Want to Be Wanted" by The Partridge Family, and the song played during and after the EBS was "The Theme From Love Story" by Henry Mancini.

=== WOWO today ===
WOWO is currently located at the Federated Media broadcast complex on Maples Road on Fort Wayne's south side; the facility also serves as the transmitter site for co-owned WKJG. WOWO was the first Fort Wayne station to transmit in AM stereo. It later became the first Fort Wayne AM station to transmit with HD Radio technology. The station streams its programs over the Internet.

On weekdays, "Fort Wayne's Morning News" is hosted by Kayla Blakeslee and was hosted by long time market veteran Charly Butcher until his sudden death in August 2018. Pat Miller, who had broadcast on Saturday mornings starting in April 2001, moved his program to the weekday afternoon drive time spot in May 2010. In January 2024, Pat Miller was released from his program and began hosting a weekend show on Saturday afternoons. Casey Hendrickson, of WOWO's sister station, 95.3 MNC in Mishawaka, IN, took over afternoon drive. Most of the standard Premiere Radio Networks syndicated schedule makes up the remainder of the broadcast day: Sean Hannity, Glenn Beck, Buck Sexton, Clyde Lewis and Coast to Coast AM with George Noory. Dan Bongino airs where Rush Limbaugh formerly aired.

Weekend programming includes Kim Kommando, Dana Loesch, Bill Cunningham and Todd Starnes. Fox News Radio supplies world and national news updates. WOWO partners with WPTA for local weather and news.

WOWO broadcasts the Fort Wayne Komets ECHL hockey games. Bob Chase announced his retirement as sports director of WOWO after 56 years behind the mic, effective June 5, 2009. Chase was the voice of the Fort Wayne Komets until his death in November 2016 at the age of 90.

In September 2014, WOWO won a Marconi Award as the Medium Market Station of the Year by the National Association of Broadcasters.

In October 2022, WOWO won for the second time a Marconi Radio Award for Medium Market Station of the Year by the National Association of Broadcasters.

=== FM simulcasts ===
Several FM stations over the years carried the WOWO-FM call letters. From 1940 to 1943, WOWO experimented with FM broadcasts as W49FW. WOWO-FM operated from 1943 to 1953 on 96.1 MHz. From 1988 to 1994, WOWO-FM in Huntington (now WJCI) broadcast at first on 103.1, then shifted to 102.9. The two stations aired an oldies music format.

On March 28, 2012, at noon, WOWO's news/talk format began to simulcast on 92.3 FM, with that station taking the WOWO-FM call letters. The station was previously WFWI, a classic rock station.

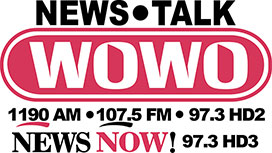
Former logo

The WOWO simulcast moved to newly launched translator station 107.5 W298BJ on December 14, 2015; 92.3, which had returned to the WFWI call sign, stopped simulcasting WOWO on January 1, 2016, as part of its transition to a classic hits format. On May 1, 2023, WOWO resumed simulcasting on WFWI 92.3 FM.

Call sign	Frequency	City of license	FID	ERP (W)	Class	Transmitter coordinates	FCC info
W298BJ	107.5 FM	Fort Wayne, Indiana	148694	75	D	41°6′39.2″N 85°11′43.9″W	LMS
