= Huntertown, Indiana =

Town in Indiana, United States

- Town
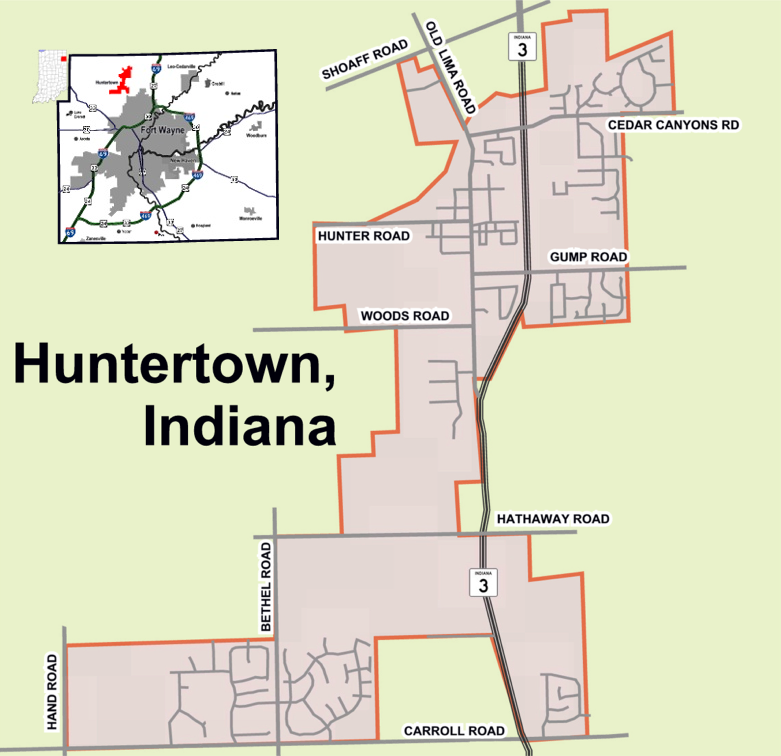

- Seal

- Location of Huntertown in Allen County, Indiana.
- Coordinates: 41°13′40″N 85°10′10″W
- Country: United States
- State: Indiana
- County: Allen
- Townships: Eel River, Perry
- Founded: 1869
- Incorporated: 1966
- Named for: William T. Hunter

Government
  - Type: Town Council
  - Council President: Michael Aker

Area
  - Total: 5.34 sq mi (13.83 km^{2})
  - Land: 5.31 sq mi (13.74 km^{2})
  - Water: 0.035 sq mi (0.09 km^{2})
- Elevation: 837 ft (255 m)

Population (2020)
  - Total: 9,141
  - Density: 1,723.2/sq mi (665.34/km^{2})
- Time zone: UTC-5 (EST)
  - Summer (DST): UTC-5 (EST)
- ZIP code: 46748
- Area code: 260
- FIPS code: 18-35266
- GNIS feature ID: 0436630
- Website: www.huntertown.org

Huntertown is a town in Allen County, Indiana, United States. The population was 9,141 at the 2020 census, representing an increase of approximately 90 percent since 2010 and making it one of the fastest growing communities in northeastern Indiana.

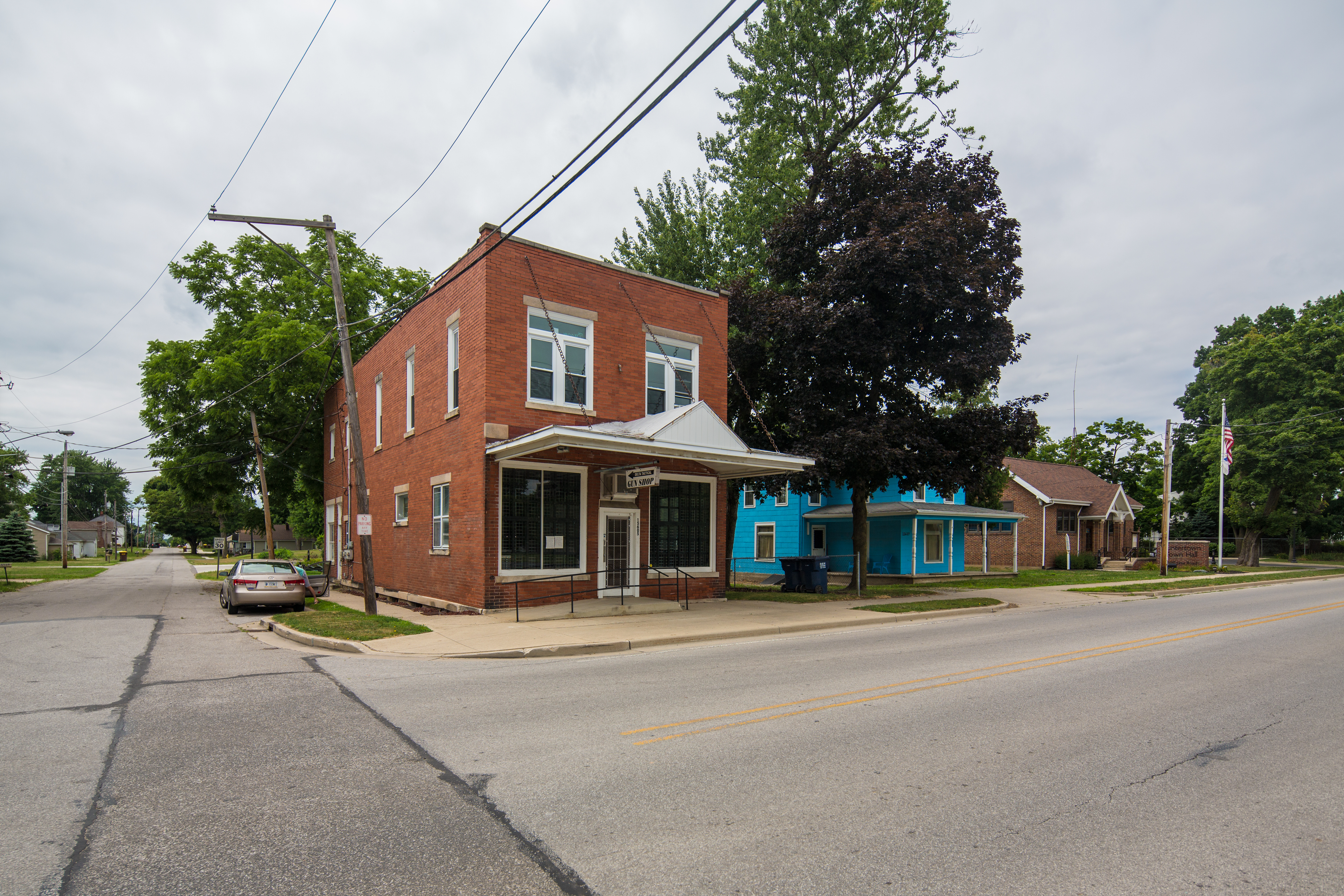
Photo from Small Town Indiana photo survey.

== History ==
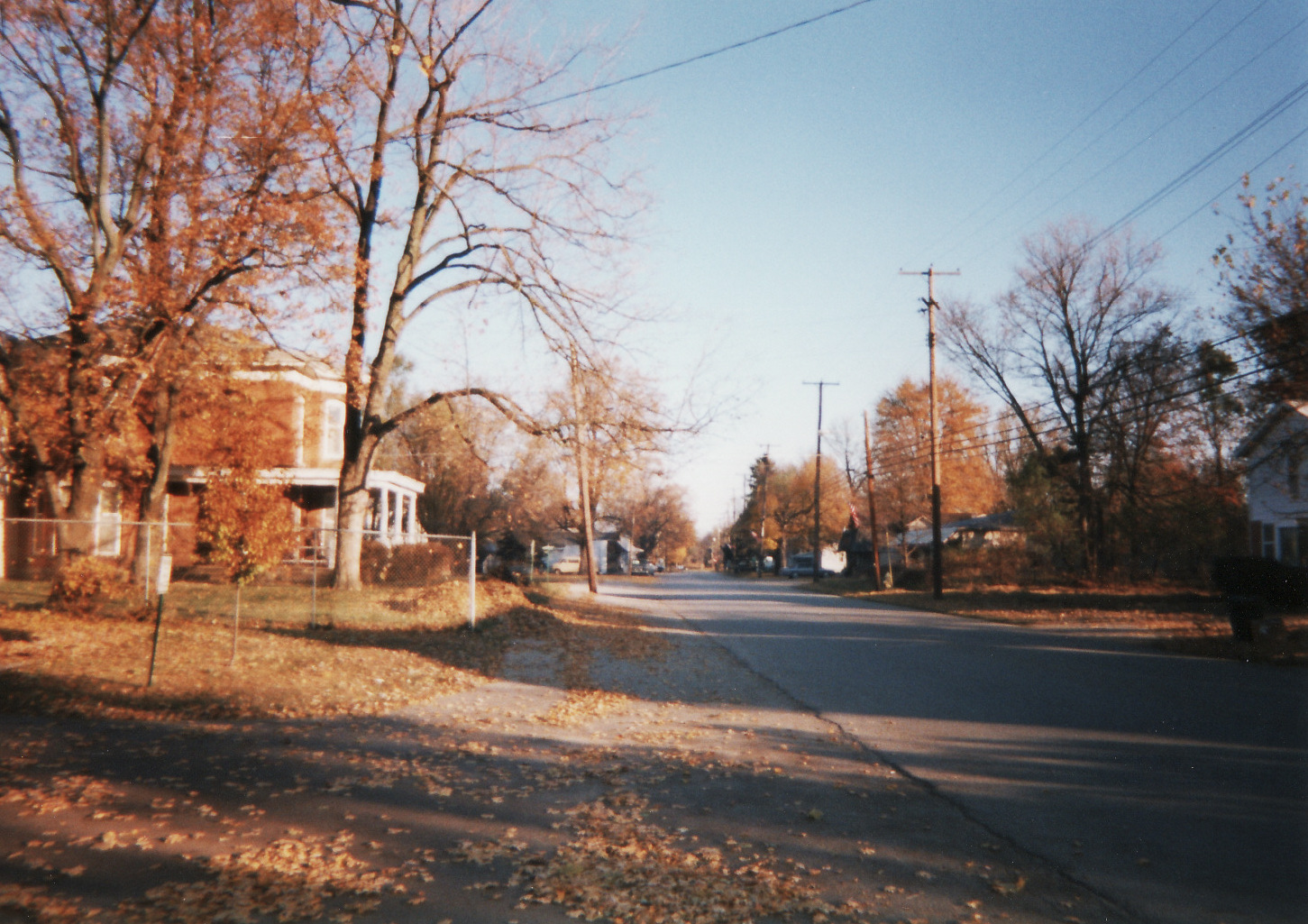
The scenic, historic downtown district of Huntertown on Old Lima Road

Huntertown was originally referred to as "The Opening" due to it being a natural forest clearing. Huntertown was first settled circa 1837 and was founded by William T. Hunter. The village was located along the Lima Plank Road connecting Lima (now Howe) and Fort Wayne. The Perry Centre Seminary was founded in Huntertown in 1856, only to close five years later when the entire faculty and adult students enlisted in the Union Army. The town was platted in 1869, but not incorporated until 1966.

Some of the nation's oldest reliable weather observations are from a nineteenth-century Huntertown farm. Rapin Andrews began keeping meteorological records on July 17, 1839, and continued until his death ten years later. His family continued the observations until April 30, 1874. The diary of weather records was presented to the U.S. Weather Bureau (now the National Weather Service) in 1934. The record highest temperature was 102 °F (39 °C) in July 1846 and the record lowest temperature was −34 °F (−37 °C) on January 29, 1873.

=== Recent developments ===
Since much of Huntertown's growth has come from people moving from urbanized areas like Fort Wayne to new suburban subdivisions, the expectations for services have increased. For example, the town council expanded from three to five members to lessen the workload. The council, as of 2020, is working on creating a new water plant, a parks board, and a new 27-acre (110,000 m^{2}) park.

The town's weekly newspaper, Northwest News, began operations in the summer of 1997 in the former Huntertown State Bank, site of a 1930s robbery by the John Dillinger gang.

== Geography ==
Huntertown is located at 41°13′40″N 85°10′10″W (41.227798, -85.169371) at an elevation of 837 feet (255 m) and sits along State Road 3/Lima Road just north of Fort Wayne. Carroll Road is the southern boundary line between Huntertown and Fort Wayne.

According to the 2010 census, Huntertown has a total area of 3.81 square miles (9.87 km^{2}), of which 3.8 square miles (9.84 km^{2}) (or 99.74%) is land and 0.01 square miles (0.03 km^{2}) (or 0.26%) is water.

== Demographics ==
Historical population
Census	Pop.	Note	%±
1970	775		—
1980	1,265		63.2%
1990	1,330		5.1%
2000	1,771		33.2%
2010	4,810		171.6%
2020	9,141		90.0%
U.S. Decennial Census

=== 2020 census ===
As of the 2020 census, Huntertown had a population of 9,141. The median age was 34.2 years. 31.0% of residents were under the age of 18 and 11.9% of residents were 65 years of age or older. For every 100 females there were 95.3 males, and for every 100 females age 18 and over there were 90.0 males age 18 and over.

97.8% of residents lived in urban areas, while 2.2% lived in rural areas.

There were 3,131 households in Huntertown, of which 47.0% had children under the age of 18 living in them. Of all households, 60.7% were married-couple households, 11.2% were households with a male householder and no spouse or partner present, and 21.8% were households with a female householder and no spouse or partner present. About 17.3% of all households were made up of individuals and 6.9% had someone living alone who was 65 years of age or older.

There were 3,235 housing units, of which 3.2% were vacant. The homeowner vacancy rate was 1.1% and the rental vacancy rate was 4.7%.

Racial composition as of the 2020 census
Race	Number	Percent
White	7,876	86.2%
Black or African American	277	3.0%
American Indian and Alaska Native	27	0.3%
Asian	356	3.9%
Native Hawaiian and Other Pacific Islander	4	0.0%
Some other race	121	1.3%
Two or more races	480	5.3%
Hispanic or Latino (of any race)	365	4.0%

=== 2010 census ===
As of the census of 2010, there were 4,810 people, 1,726 households, and 1,299 families residing in the town. The population density was 1,265.8 inhabitants per square mile (488.7/km^{2}). There were 1,823 housing units at an average density of 479.7 per square mile (185.2/km^{2}). The racial makeup of the town was 93.6% White, 1.4% African American, 0.4% Native American, 2.0% Asian, 0.8% from other races, and 1.9% from two or more races. Hispanic or Latino of any race were 2.3% of the population.

There were 1,726 households, of which 45.8% had children under the age of 18 living with them, 58.8% were married couples living together, 12.1% had a female householder with no husband present, 4.4% had a male householder with no wife present, and 24.7% were non-families. 19.4% of all households were made up of individuals, and 4.7% had someone living alone who was 65 years of age or older. The average household size was 2.79 and the average family size was 3.21.

The median age in the town was 31.5 years. 31.9% of residents were under the age of 18; 7% were between the ages of 18 and 24; 33.4% were from 25 to 44; 21.3% were from 45 to 64; and 6.4% were 65 years of age or older. The gender makeup of the town was 49.2% male and 50.8% female.

=== 2000 census ===
As of 2000 the median income for a household in the town in 2000 was $52,250, and the median income for a family was $59,219. Males had a median income of $41,150 versus $28,152 for females. The per capita income for the town was $21,232. About 3.0% of families and 4.2% of the population were below the poverty line, including 6.1% of those under age 18 and 6.3% of those age 65 or over.
