= WBET-FM =

Radio station in Sturgis, Michigan

Coordinates: 41.770°N 85.419°W

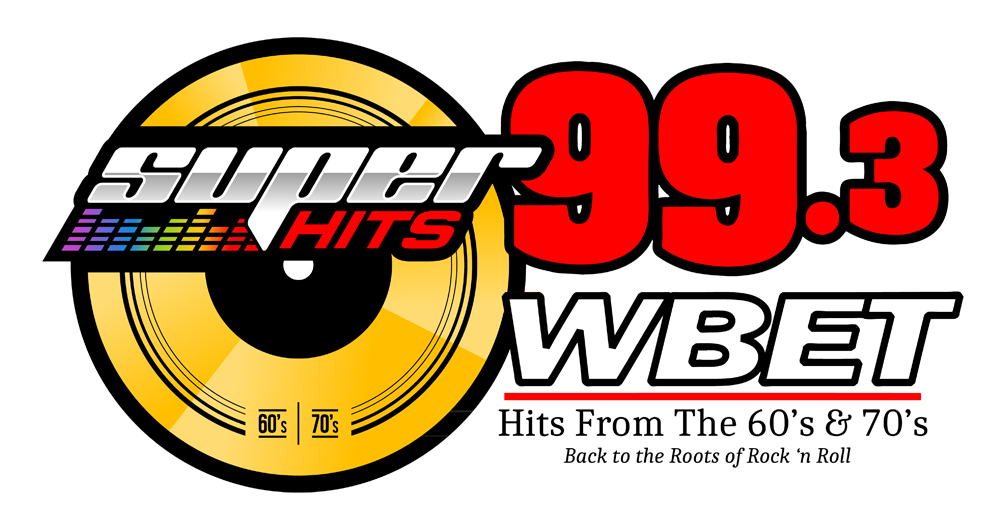
- Sturgis, Michigan; United States
- Frequency: 99.3 MHz
- Branding: SuperHits 99.3 WBET

Programming
- Format: Classic hits
- Affiliations: Fox News Radio

Ownership
- Owner: Swick Broadcasting Company
- Sister stations: WBET, WTHD, WLKI, WLZZ

History
- Former call signs: WSTR-FM (1951-11/24/89); WMSH-FM (1989–2009)

Technical information
- Licensing authority: FCC
- Facility ID: 22125
- Class: A
- ERP: 4,400 watts
- HAAT: 100 meters (330 ft)

Links
- Public license information: Public file; LMS
- Webcast: Listen live
- Website: wbetfm.com

WBET-FM (99.3 MHz, "Super Hits 99.3") (formerly WMSH-FM and WSTR-FM) is a radio station located in Sturgis, Michigan.

== Sources ==
- Michiguide.com - WBET-FM History
- True Oldies 99.3 MySpace page
