= WBET (AM) =

Radio station in Sturgis, Michigan

Coordinates: 41°46′11″N 85°25′09″W

- Sturgis, Michigan; United States
- Broadcast area: (Daytime) (Nighttime)
- Frequency: 1230 kHz
- Branding: Fox Sports Radio 99.7 FM & 1230 AM

Programming
- Format: Sports
- Affiliations: Fox Sports Radio; Detroit Lions Radio Network; Detroit Tigers Radio Network; Michigan IMG Sports Network

Ownership
- Owner: Swick Broadcasting Company
- Sister stations: WBET-FM, WTHD, WLKI, WLZZ

History
- First air date: 1951 (as WSTR)
- Former call signs: WSTR (1951-12/5/89); WMSH (1989–2009)

Technical information
- Licensing authority: FCC
- Facility ID: 22120
- Class: C
- Power: 1,000 watts
- Translator: 99.7 W259CR (licensed to Athens but located near LaGrange, Indiana)

Links
- Public license information: Public file; LMS
- Webcast: Listen Live
- Website: foxsportssturgis.com

WBET (1230 kHz) is an AM sports radio station located in Sturgis, Michigan.

Logo before translator sign on
