= WTHD =

Coordinates: 41°37′24″N 85°20′49″W

- LaGrange, Indiana; United States
- Broadcast area: Sturgis, Michigan; Kendallville, Indiana
- Frequency: 105.5 MHz
- Branding: Thunder Country 105.5

Programming
- Format: Country music
- Affiliations: Fox News Radio

Ownership
- Owner: Swick Broadcasting Company
- Sister stations: WBET, WBET-FM

History
- Call sign meaning: Thunder

Technical information
- Licensing authority: FCC
- Facility ID: 36274
- Class: A
- ERP: 2,400 watts
- HAAT: 159 meters (522 ft)

Links
- Public license information: Public file; LMS
- Website: wthd.net

WTHD (105.5 FM) is a radio station broadcasting a country music format. Licensed to LaGrange, Indiana, the station serves the areas of Sturgis, Michigan and Kendallville, Indiana, and is owned by Swick Broadcasting Company, Inc.

The current WTHD airstaff consists of morning show host Jeremy Robinson (6 am to 10 am) and News Director, Mike Stiles.
