= The Elkhart Truth =

Daily news organization in Indiana, United States

- Type: Daily newspaper
- Format: Print and digital
- Owner: Paxton Media Group
- Publisher: David Damerow
- Managing editor: Jon Gard
- Founded: October 15, 1889
- Language: English
- Headquarters: 421 South Second Street; Elkhart, IN 46516
- ISSN: 0746-7516
- Website: elkharttruth.com

The Elkhart Truth is a daily news organization based in Elkhart, Indiana, that covers Elkhart County in northern Indiana and was founded as a newspaper in 1887.

== History ==
The Elkhart Truth was first printed October 15, 1887. It was founded by Charles G. Conn, who served as Elkhart's mayor, as well as a U.S. congressman. Additionally, Conn was the owner of musical instrument manufacturing empire C.G. Conn Ltd., which is sometimes referred to as Conn Instruments.

In 1915, Conn's business interests were taken over by a group of investors headed by Carl D. Greenleaf. Shortly afterwards, Greenleaf and A.H. Beardsley purchased the newspaper from investors.

John F. Dille Jr., a classmate of one of Greenleaf's sons, took over responsibility for The Elkhart Truth's operations in 1952 and eventually bought out Greenleaf and Beardsley. In addition to being an accomplished newspaperman, John Dille Jr. is also noted in history as one of the men who helped train and worked with the Golden Thirteen – the United States Navy's first African-American officers, who were commissioned during World War II.

The Dille family became the sole owner of The Elkhart Truth. Eventually it became part of the Federated Media family of companies, with John F. Dille III serving as the president of Federated Media. John F. Dille III worked as a copy boy at The Washington Post; as a reporter for Thomson Newspapers, Ltd., in England, Scotland and Wales; as a reporter for The Mishawaka Times; and as a reporter for The Elkhart Truth.

John F. Dille III also worked in broadcast journalism, as Federated Media owns 15 radio stations. He has served as chairman of the Radio Advertising Bureau (US), chairman of the National Association of Broadcasters Radio Board, president of the Indiana Broadcasters Association, chairman of the Legislative Liaison Committee (LLC) program, director of Michiana Public Telecasting and chairman of the Indiana LLC. In 2000, John F. Dille III became an adjunct professor at Northern Arizona University, where he teaches broadcast management.

In 2014, The Elkhart Truth re-launched Truth Radio 1340 under the call letters WTRC-AM, which hosted a news show weekday mornings that included stories reported by the publication.

Another addition in 2014 was the creation of Flavor 574, a standalone digital magazine run by The Elkhart Truth's staff that was dedicated to covering Michiana's culinary scene.

The Elkhart Truth celebrated the 125th anniversary of its first printing October 15, 2014.

Federated Media sold The Elkhart Truth to Paxton Media Group on May 1, 2016. Federated Media retained Truth Radio 1340 and Flavor 574 as part of the sales agreement.

== Awards ==
- Elkhart Truth takes top honors in IAPME contest
- The Elkhart Truth wins 17 awards from Indiana Associated Press Media Editors
- The Elkhart Truth earns nine awards from Local Media Association
- The Elkhart Truth wins eight Hoosier State Press Association awards
- The Elkhart Truth wins five Inland Press Association awards for editorials, multimedia and digital journalism
- Elkhart Truth journalists win six awards in state competition
- The Elkhart Truth wins four digital awards from Local Media Association
- Three Truth staffers win Hoosier State Press Association awards

== See also ==
- List of newspapers in Indiana
- List of family-owned newspapers in the United States
- List of newspapers in the United States
