= 95.5 FM =

FM radio frequency

The following radio stations broadcast on FM frequency 95.5 MHz:

== Argentina ==
- Alfa y omega in Campana, Buenos Aires
- Amistad in Villa Huidobro, Córdoba
- Corazón in Rosario, Santa Fe
- Cyber in Villa Carlos Paz, Córdoba
- Concepto in Buenos Aires
- del molino in Trevelin, Chubut
- El Grito in Los Hornillos, Córdoba
- LRI803 Las Parejas in Las Parejas, Santa Fe
- la Zero in Rio Cuarto, Córdoba
- Libertad in Olavarria, Buenos Aires
- Live in Capilla del Monte, Córdoba
- LRI 736 Universal in Bahía Blanca, Buenos Aires
- LRP 782 Máxima in Ceres, Santa Fe
- Activa in Valle de Uco, Mendoza
- LRF321 Tiempo in Rio Turbio, Santa Cruz
- Más LRH 927 in Campo Grande, Misiones
- Metro Mendoza in Mendoza
- Mediterránea in Concepcion, Tucuman
- Popular in Chilecito, La Rioja
- Radio María in Adrogué, Buenos Aires
- Radio María in Maipú, Buenos Aires
- Radio Maria in Tres Isletas, Chaco
- Radio Maria in Camilo Aldao, Córdoba
- Radio Maria in Victoria, Entre Ríos
- Radio María in Abra Pampa, Jujuy
- Radio María in Eduardo Castex, La Pampa
- Uno in Dolores, Buenos Aires
- Vos in Brandsen, Buenos Aires

== Australia ==
- 2MRR in Port Macquarie, New South Wales
- 2CP/T in Jindabyne, New South Wales
- ROK FM in Parkes, New South Wales
- Radio TAB in Bundaberg, Queensland
- Radio TAB in Emerald, Queensland
- Radio TAB in Roxby Downs, South Australia
- Radio TAB in Renmark, South Australia
- 3CAT in Geelong, Victoria
- ABC Classic in Kalgoorlie, Western Australia
- Merto FM, Love Relay 94

== Canada (Channel 238) ==
- CBA-FM in Moncton, New Brunswick
- CBF-FM-14 in St-Jovite, Quebec
- CBKE-FM in La Loche, Saskatchewan
- CBKI-FM in Stanley Mission, Saskatchewan
- CBMU-FM in Harrington Harbour, Quebec
- CBN-FM-6 in Baie Verte, Newfoundland and Labrador
- CBNR-FM in Ramea, Newfoundland and Labrador
- CBOC-FM in Cornwall, Ontario
- CBUF-FM-4 in Prince George, British Columbia
- CBUH-FM in Chase, British Columbia
- CBUY-FM in Port Hardy, British Columbia
- CBWE-FM in Easterville, Manitoba
- CBWL-FM in Snow Lake, Manitoba
- CBWM-FM in Oxford House, Manitoba
- CBWQ-FM in South Indian Lake, Manitoba
- CFLX-FM in Sherbrooke, Quebec
- CFVD-FM in Degelis, Quebec
- CFXP-FM in Jasper, Alberta
- CHLB-FM in Lethbridge, Alberta
- CIAM-FM-2 in Buffalo Head, Alberta
- CIAM-FM-14 in Wabasca, Alberta
- CIAM-FM-15 in Fort Chipewyan, Alberta
- CIAM-FM-18 in Manning, Alberta
- CIYN-FM in Kincardine, Ontario
- CJLR-FM-6 in North Battleford, Saskatchewan
- CJLS-FM in Yarmouth, Nova Scotia
- CJOJ-FM in Belleville, Ontario
- CJTK-FM in Sudbury, Ontario
- CKGY-FM in Red Deer, Alberta
- VF2123 in Valemount, British Columbia
- VF2204 in Kemano, British Columbia
- VF2290 in Carol Lake Mining, Newfoundland and Labrador

== China ==
- CNR Business Radio in Huizhou
- CNR China Traffic Radio in Shanghai
- CNR Music Radio in Jinan and Xi'an
- CNR The Voice of China in Sanya

== Colombia ==
- HJU54-FM in Bogotá, Bogotá D.C.

== Ireland ==
- LMFM in Drogheda, County Louth

== Israel ==
- Kan Bet in Arabah, Jerusalem and Safed

== Malaysia ==
- Radio Klasik in Central Kelantan

== Mexico ==
- XHCD-FM in Hermosillo, Sonora
- XHCMM-FM in Coalcomán, Michoacán
- XHELG-FM in León, Guanajuato
- XHGYC-FM in Guadalupe y Calvo, Chihuahua
- XHKIN-FM in Magdalena de Kino, Sonora
- XHKN-FM in Huetamo, Michoacán
- XHMP-FM in Torreón, Coahuila
- XHNAS-FM in Navajoa, Sonora
- XHOE-FM in Querétaro, Querétaro
- XHPCAR-FM in Ciudad del Carmen, Campeche
- XHPEDN-FM in Puerto Escondido, Oaxaca
- XHPTCS-FM in Tapachula, Chiapas
- XHSCEH-FM in Capulhuac, Estado de México
- XHRG-FM in Ciudad Acuña, Coahuila
- XHRO-FM in Zapopan, Jalisco
- XHTP-FM in Banderilla, Veracruz
- XHUAC-FM in Ensenada, Baja California
- XHZT-FM in Puebla, Puebla
- XHZTZ-FM in Zacatecas, Zacatecas

== Philippines ==
- DWDM-FM in Manila
- DWEL-FM in Laoag City, Ilocos Norte
- DWRC-FM in Legazpi City
- DYMX in Cebu City
- DXKR-FM in Davao City
- DXEL in Zamboanga City
- DXSK in Marawi City

== United Kingdom ==
- BBC Radio Lancashire in East and Central Lancashire
- BBC Radio Nottingham in Central Nottinghamshire
- BBC Radio Somerset
- BBC Radio Suffolk in Lowestoft
- BBC Three Counties Radio in Bedfordshire and North Hertfordshire
- BBC Radio York in Filey and Scarborough

== United States (Channel 238) ==
- KAAN in Bethany, Missouri
- KAFX in Diboll, Texas
- KAHE in Dodge City, Kansas
- KAIM in Honolulu, Hawaii
- KAIQ in Wolfforth, Texas
- KBEK in Mora, Minnesota
- KBFF in Portland, Oregon
- KCBP in Westley, California
- KCHH in Worden, Montana
- KCHK-FM in New Prague, Minnesota
- KDHS-LP in Delta Junction, Alaska
- KFCE-LP in Wills Point, Texas
- KGLI in Sioux City, Iowa
- KHFM in Santa Fe, New Mexico
- KITX in Hugo, Oklahoma
- KJCY in Saint Ansgar, Iowa
- KJEZ in Poplar Bluff, Missouri
- KKHK in Carmel, California
- KKMJ in Austin, Texas
- KKZY in Bemidji, Minnesota
- KLAQ in El Paso, Texas
- KLBG in Lindsborg, Kansas
- KLDI-LP in Lodi, California
- KLOS in Los Angeles, California
- KMBR in Butte, Montana
- KMLS in Miles, Texas
- KNDY in Marysville, Kansas
- KNEV in Reno, Nevada
- KNLT in Palmer, Alaska
- KOME-FM in Tolar, Texas
- KOYH in Elaine, Arkansas
- KPHT in Rocky Ford, Colorado
- KQWJ-LP in Jonesboro, Louisiana
- KRQP-LP in Arlington, Texas
- KRRQ in Lafayette, Louisiana
- KRVG in Glenwood Springs, Colorado
- KSDZ in Gordon, Nebraska
- KSGV-LP in Seagoville, Texas
- KSTO in Agana, Guam
- KTOZ in Pleasant Hope, Missouri
- KTWF in Scotland, Texas
- KUJJ in McCall, Idaho
- KVAP-LP in Port Arthur, Texas
- KVWR-LP in Dallas, Texas
- KWAH-LP in Ennis, Texas
- KWEN in Tulsa, Oklahoma
- KWEY-FM in Clinton, Oklahoma
- KWNR in Henderson, Nevada
- KWYY in Midwest, Wyoming
- KXBS in Bethalto, Illinois
- KXEU in Ballard, Utah
- KYFO in Ogden, Utah
- KYNU in Jamestown, North Dakota
- KYOT in Phoenix, Arizona
- KYWY in Pine Bluffs, Wyoming
- KZAT-FM in Belle Plaine, Iowa
- KZFM in Corpus Christi, Texas
- KZLC-LP in Pineville, Louisiana
- WART-LP in Marshall, North Carolina
- WBOP in Buffalo Gap, Virginia
- WBYL in Salladasburg, Pennsylvania
- WCHI-FM in Chicago, Illinois
- WCPL-LP in Merritt Island, Florida
- WCXE-LP in Erlanger, Kentucky
- WFGI in Johnstown, Pennsylvania
- WFIZ in Odessa, New York
- WFMH in Hackleburg, Alabama
- WFMS in Indianapolis, Indiana
- WGFE in Glen Arbor, Michigan
- WGLO in Pekin, Illinois
- WHLH in Jackson, Mississippi
- WHPE in High Point, North Carolina
- WIBZ in Wedgefield, South Carolina
- WIFC in Wausau, Wisconsin
- WIXV in Savannah, Georgia
- WJDB in Thomasville, Alabama
- WJOR-LP in Whitesville, Kentucky
- WKQI in Detroit, Michigan
- WKLV-FM in Cleveland, Ohio
- WLDI in Juno Beach, Florida
- WLTE in Powdersville, South Carolina
- WLVO in Providence, Rhode Island
- WMFH-LP in Columbus, Mississippi
- WMXP-LP in Greenville, South Carolina
- WNGR-LP in Tigerville, South Carolina
- WNIR-LP in Newberry, South Carolina
- WOOO-LP in Defiance, Ohio
- WOXD in Oxford, Mississippi
- WPGC in Morningside, Maryland
- WPLJ in New York, New York
- WPPI in Topsham, Maine
- WPWZ in Pinetops, North Carolina
- WQHY in Prestonsburg, Kentucky
- WRJM-LP in Cullman, Alabama
- WSBB-FM in Doraville, Georgia
- WSKR-LP in Jacksonville, Florida
- WSM in Nashville, Tennessee
- WTVY in Dothan, Alabama
- WUTT-LP in Erie, Pennsylvania
- WVXE-LP in Orange Park, Florida
- WWMV-LP in Madison, Wisconsin
- WXMG in Lancaster, Ohio
- WXXX in South Burlington, Vermont
- WYJB in Albany, New York
- WYJR-LP in Middlesboro, Kentucky
- WYND-FM in Silver Springs, Florida
