= WLHH =

Radio station in Ridgeland, South Carolina

Coordinates: 32.436°N 80.923°W

- Ridgeland, South Carolina; United States
- Broadcast area: Hilton Head Island metropolitan area
- Frequency: 104.9 MHz
- Branding: 104.9 The Surf

Programming
- Format: Classic hits

Ownership
- Owner: Saga Communications; (Saga South Communications, LLC)
- Sister stations: WOEZ; WVSC

History
- First air date: 1988
- Former call signs: WXRY (1985–1988); WZBZ (1988–1990); WSHG (1990–1997); WGZR (1997–2003); WWVV (2003–2006); WWJN (2006–2010)
- Call sign meaning: We Love Hilton Head

Technical information
- Licensing authority: FCC
- Facility ID: 40705
- Class: C3
- ERP: 16,000 watts
- HAAT: 125 meters (410 ft)

Links
- Public license information: Public file; LMS
- Webcast: Listen live
- Website: 1049thesurf.com

WLHH (104.9 FM) is a commercial radio station licensed to Ridgeland, South Carolina, United States, and serving the Hilton Head Island metropolitan area. It has a classic hits format and is owned by Saga Communications. The studios are on Westbury Park Way in Bluffton.

WLHH's transmitter is sited on Cherry Hill Road near Bridgetown Drive in Ridgeland.

== History ==
=== Oldies and Adult Alternative ===
In 1985, the 104.9 frequency was assigned as a construction permit to Mattox-Guest Broadcasting. The call sign was WXRY-FM. The station signed on the air in 1988. Once it debuted, the call letters were WZBZ. It became an oldies station in 1990 as WSHG, known as "Shag FM". In 1997, Shag FM moved its format to what was then WHBZ (now WXST). The 104.9 frequency became the original home of WGZR "The Gator", a country music station.

In 2003, modern rock WWVV, at 106.9 FM, traded frequencies with the Gator. Upon the station swap, WWVV ("Wave 104.9"), flipped formats and was a modern-based Adult Album Alternative station. The station enjoyed a small yet loyal following in the Savannah and Hilton Head Island markets. Ratings were usually higher in Hilton Head due to some signal problems in Savannah.

=== Triad Broadcasting ===
WWVV was owned and operated by Triad Broadcasting. But locally it was known as "Adventure Radio," the name of the company that owned WWVV before Triad. Management at Triad did not want to scare off potential advertisers or listeners by announcing new station owners. WWVV and six other stations were bought by Triad in May 2000. In the Savannah/Hilton Head area, Triad also owns stations WFXH-FM (Rock 106.1), WGCO-FM (BIG 98.3), WUBB (Country 106.9), WXYY (Y-107.9), and WHHW (1130 The Island).

On June 15, 2006, Triad purchased WVSC (103.1 The Drive) from Zip Communications. Triad had been operating WGZO under a local marketing agreement (LMA) with Zip. In order to comply with FCC regulations, Triad decided to sell the company's lowest-powered radio station, WWVV-FM, to South Carolina-based Broomfield Broadcasting via the company's subsidiary, JB Broadcasting.

=== John FM and The Surf ===
On November 21, 2006, the station began playing Christmas music as "104.9 John FM". It used a new call sign, WWJN-FM. A recorded male voice could be heard between songs stating "104.9 is John FM. John tells us what to play. Right now John wants to hear Christmas music so that's what we're playing. 104.9 John FM". JB Broadcasting sold the station to Low Country Radio LLC in January 2010. With the sale, John FM ended its Christmas music on January 25.

Until the new station signed on the air on the 27th, the station stunted by broadcasting the sound of waves hitting the beach. JB Broadcasting's sale of the station closed on March 15, 2010. The station changed its call sign to WLHH (We Love Hilton Head) on March 16, 2010. On that date, it shifted the format to classic hits, calling itself "104.9 The Surf."

In 2014, the station was sold again, this time to Apex Broadcasting, Inc. The purchase price was $682,500. The transaction was consummated on May 30, 2014. In early 2017, Apex Broadcasting sold their radio stations in Charleston and Hilton Head to Saga Communications for $23 million. The transaction was consummated on September 1, 2017.
