= WNRJ =

WNRJ may refer to:

- WNRJ (AM), a radio station (1200 AM) licensed to serve Huntington, West Virginia, United States
- WJOE (FM), a radio station (103.9 FM) licensed to serve Vienna, West Virginia, which held the call sign WNRJ from 2011 to 2023
- WUSH, a radio station (106.1 FM) licensed to serve Poquoson, Virginia, United States, which held the call sign WNRJ from 2006 to 2007
- WXZX, a radio station (105.7 FM) licensed to serve Hilliard, Ohio, United States, which held the call sign WNRJ from 1990 to 1991
