= WLGC =

WLGC may refer to:

- WLGC-FM, a radio station (105.7 FM) licensed to serve Greenup, Kentucky, United States
- WLGC (AM), a defunct radio station (1520 AM) formerly licensed to serve Greenup, Kentucky
