= WVGB =

Radio station in Beaufort, South Carolina

- Beaufort, South Carolina; United States
- Frequency: 1490 kHz
- Branding: Praise 94.5

Programming
- Format: Gospel

Ownership
- Owner: Mount Carmel Baptist Church

History
- First air date: January 1962; 64 years ago
- Former call signs: WSIB (1962–1981)

Technical information
- Licensing authority: FCC
- Facility ID: 70408
- Class: C
- Power: 500 watts day; 1,000 watts night
- Transmitter coordinates: 32°26′8″N 80°41′54″W
- Translator: 94.5 W233AW (Beaufort)

Links
- Public license information: Public file; LMS
- Webcast: Listen Live
- Website: 945praise.com

WVGB (1490 AM) is a radio station licensed to Beaufort, South Carolina, United States. The station is currently owned by Mount Carmel Baptist Church and broadcasts a gospel music format known as "Praise 94.5", reflecting the frequency of its FM translator.

Established in 1962 as WSIB, the second radio station in Beaufort, a license revocation by the Federal Communications Commission over billing fraud resulted in what amounted to a forced sale in 1981. For most of the time since then, under the WVGB call sign, the station has served the local Black community.

== History ==
=== WSIB ===
In 1957, the Sea Island Broadcasting Company was incorporated, signaling the beginning of a bid to bring a second station to Beaufort, which already had one, the daytime-only WBEU (960 AM). However, it was another company with the same name but different stockholders that applied two years later to construct a 100-watt station on 1490 kHz at Beaufort. The Federal Communications Commission (FCC) approved the application on July 26, 1961, after reaching a settlement with Ben Davies, who also sought the frequency. Construction took place in late 1961, in advance of a January 1962 opening.

The original shareholders sold WSIB in 1965 to the Sea Island Broadcasting Corporation of S.C., which was controlled by Charles Bell, the station's chief engineer, with the Merritt and Klatt families owning the remainder. Bell applied for and received power increases to 500 watts daytime, activated in 1967, and 250 watts at night, effective in 1969.

On November 28, 1973, the FCC issued an order to Sea Island Broadcasting Corporation ordering it to show cause why its license should not be revoked for fraudulent billing practices. The case was designated for hearing, and in May 1975, FCC examiner Chester F. Naumowicz issued an initial decision calling for its revocation. Naumowicz charged Bell with making a series of false statements to the FCC and its investigators in connection with the case, which probed the use of "double billing" between 1971 and 1973, and noted that the actions "merited the severest sanctions". Double billing was a type of fraud in relation to co-op advertising for local distributors of national products and services; WSIB would charge the national firm double the actual cost of advertising then rebate half that amount to the local business. Bell lodged an appeal, while his attorneys released a statement noting of their "shock" at the ruling.

The decision was appealed to the full FCC, which ruled 6–0 on June 24, 1976, in favor of revocation. It also denied a proposal to allow Sea Island Broadcasting to sell the station; Bell promised a "fight to the end". Arguing that a leak of the decision in Broadcasting magazine influenced the decision and calling the FCC's ruling "predetermined", Sea Island first appealed to the FCC again without success and then took the case to a federal appeals court. At the start of 1980, a three-judge panel of the court found against Sea Island, and the station was ordered off the air if it did not intend to pursue the case further. After the Supreme Court of the United States also sided with the commission, WSIB was originally ordered to close by January 21, 1981, but it never went off the air, as an agreement was reached to allow interim operating authority to be held by William and Vivian Galloway, who had also filed for permanent authority to run the station.

On March 18, Bell was murdered after having apparently surprised a yard worker attempting to steal silver; his body was found in a field in Early Branch, while his car was stolen and recovered in Jacksonville, Florida. The suspect, Billy Eugene Brooker, pleaded guilty to charges including murder, kidnapping, and grand larceny in December 1981 and sentenced to three life terms in prison.

=== WVGB ===
On June 1, 1981, the Galloways changed the call sign of the interim station to WVGB. The format was shifted to focus on the Black community in the area with urban contemporary music. Meanwhile, a competition shaped up for permanent authority to operate the frequency. In addition to the Galloways, the Merrill and Klatt families also lodged a bid; they were also attempting to settle Bell's estate and claimed they were owed a total of $130,000. The Galloway application was selected by an FCC administrative law judge because the Merrill–Klatt group failed to prove it was financially qualified.

In 1984, the Galloways and two other applicants for a new FM station at Port Royal merged, winning the construction permit. It signed on as WGCQ (92.1 FM) in June 1985.

By 1991, WVGB had found its programming niche, serving the Lowcountry's Black community with a gospel music format as well as broadcasts of local worship services. By 1998, Galloway also owned a funeral home and a limousine rental business.

After constructing an FM translator, W233AW (94.5 FM), in 2011, the Galloways sold WVGB after 30 years to Partners Broadcasting Company, which owned regional FM station WLHH; Galloway would continue to be involved in producing music and talk programming for the outlet. The sale terms stipulated that at least four hours a week of programming on Sunday mornings continue to be aimed at local Black listeners. In addition, Galloway continued to be heard on WVGB, as the services of the First Euhaw Baptist Church in Ridgeland, where he was pastor, aired weekly. However, the station dropped the gospel format and flipped to contemporary hit radio, targeting the Hilton Head Island area, as "94.5 The Party". The station flipped to classic hits as "94.5 The Coast" in July 2012, after partner Joel Garrett bought the other two owners out.

Partners Broadcasting sold WVGB and W233AW to Mount Carmel Baptist Church in 2015 for $300,000, the same price they had purchased the station for three years prior. The church returned the station to a gospel format as "Praise 94.5" that August.
