= WLOW =

WLOW may refer to:

- WLOW-LD, a low-power television station (channel 30, virtual 19) licensed to serve Charleston, South Carolina, United States
- WLOW-LP, a defunct low-power television station (channel 19) formerly licensed to serve Beaufort, South Carolina
- WRWN, a radio station (107.9 FM) licensed to serve Port Royal, South Carolina, which held the call sign WLOW from 1996 to 2011
- WUBB, a radio station (106.9 FM) licensed to serve Bluffton, South Carolina, which held the call sign WLOW from 1987 to 1994 and again from 1994 to 1996
- WXST, a radio station (99.7 FM) licensed to serve Hollywood, South Carolina, which held the call sign WLOW in 1994
