= KUJJ =

KUJJ may refer to:

- KUJJ (FM), a radio station (95.5 FM) licensed to serve McCall, Idaho, United States
- KNHK-FM, a radio station (101.9 FM) licensed to serve Weston, Oregon, United States, which held the call sign KUJJ from 2006 to 2012
