= WJOE =

WJOE may refer to:

- WJOE (FM), a radio station (103.9 FM) licensed to serve Vienna, West Virginia, United States
- WNRJ (AM), a radio station (1200 AM) licensed to serve Huntington, West Virginia, which held the callsign WJOE from May 19 to November 13, 2023
- WRDF, a radio station (106.3 FM) licensed to serve Columbia City, Indiana, United States, which held the call sign WJOE from 2009 to 2011
- WQVD, a radio station (700 AM) licensed to serve Orange, Massachusetts, United States, which held the call sign WJOE from 2005 to 2009
