= KNHK =

KNHK may refer to:

- KNHK-FM, a radio station (101.9 FM) licensed to serve Weston, Oregon, United States
- KJYR, a radio station (104.5 FM) licensed to serve Newport, Washington, United States, that held the call sign KNHK-FM from 2014 to 2021
- Naval Air Station Patuxent River (ICAO code KNHK)
