= Hank FM =

Country formated radio network

- Type: Country radio network
- Branding: Hank FM
- First air date: March 25, 2005; 21 years ago
- Owner: Kroeger Media
- Official website: hankfmradio.com

Hank FM is the on-air brand name of several radio stations in the United States and Canada. Stations using the Hank FM brand name typically air a country format, in configurations of classic country, contemporary country, or a less tightly formatted mix of the two. They generally use the slogan (He) Plays Everything Country on their mixed country radio stations, (He) Plays Country Legends on their classic country radio stations or (He) Plays New Country on their contemporary country radio stations.

The format was conceived and is owned by Howard Kroeger, creator of the Bob FM format. Kroeger also provides the voice for HANK. The name may be inspired by Hank Williams, a highly influential country singer from the late 1940s and early 1950s whose son Hank Jr. and grandson Hank III also had success as country musicians, each with their own styles.

At least one station currently branded as Hank FM does not fall in line with the format of the other stations, using the brand name for an adult hits format more similar to the Jack or Bob formats (likewise, there are a few country stations that brand with Bob). Much like Jack FM and Bob FM, Hank FM stations have playlists of over 1000 songs as opposed to average amounts of less than 500 songs.

== Hank FM stations ==
- Coosa, Georgia - WSRM
- Tifton, Georgia - WKZZ
- Glen Rose, Texas - KTFW-FM
- Weston, Oregon - KNHK-FM - Covers the Tri-Cities, Washington market
- Shelbyville, Indiana - WLHK
- Myrtle Beach, South Carolina - WWHK
- Mount Sterling, Kentucky - WLXO
- Waterloo, Iowa - KPTY
- Belle Plaine, Kansas - KGHF
- Roaring Spring, Pennsylvania - WKMC
- Salt Lake City, Utah - KNAH
- Waverly, Ohio - WXIZ
- Dayton, Nevada - KXZZ
- Seattle, Washington - KPLZ-FM
- Caldwell, Idaho - KTHI
- Greenup, Kentucky - WLGC-FM
- Manchester, Ohio - WAGX
- Middleport, Ohio - WYVK

=== Former stations ===
- Newport, Washington - KNHK-FM
- Gulfport, Mississippi - WGBL
- Bridgewater, Nova Scotia - CJHK-FM
- Mustang, Oklahoma - KNAH
- Scotland, Texas - KTWF
- Trenton, Florida - WDVH-FM
- Callaway, Florida - WAKT-FM
- Midway, Georgia - WGCO
- Augusta, Kansas - KVWF
- Madison, Wisconsin - WHIT
- Shasta Lake, California - KNNN
- Redding, California - KNNN-LP
- Carmel, California - KKHK
- Phoenix, Oregon - KAKT
- Ettrick, Virginia - WWLB
- Merced, California - KNAH
- Columbia Falls, Montana - KHNK
- Winnipeg, Manitoba - CNHK-FM
- Ironton, Ohio - WIRO-FM
- Enon, Ohio - WCLI-FM

== See also ==
- Nash FM
