= KZIU =

KZIU may refer to:

- KJYR, a radio station (104.5 FM) licensed to serve Newport, Washington, United States, which held the call sign KZIU-FM from 2021 to 2022
- KNHK-FM, a radio station (101.9 FM) licensed to serve Weston, Oregon, United States, which held the call sign KZIU-FM from 2012 to 2021
