= WFXH =

WFXH may refer to:

- WFXH-FM, a radio station (106.1 FM) licensed to Hilton Head Island, South Carolina, United States
- WHHW, a radio station (1130 AM) licensed to Hilton Head Island, South Carolina, which held the call sign WFXH from 1995 to 2011
