= Báalam =

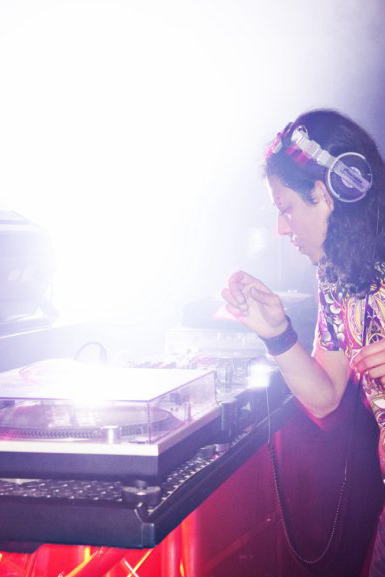
- Báalam playing DJ set in Winnipeg, Canada

Background information
- Origin: Mexico City, Mexico
- Genres: Psychedelic trance
- Years active: 2003–present
- Labels: Caffix Records

Báalam is a Mexican psytrance promoter, producer and DJ. Born in Mexico City, he is based in Manitoba, Canada.

== Biography ==
Báalam first entered into the music scene at the age of 17 as a drummer for several rock projects.

He was the co-founder of a promoter of psytrance music in Sonora, Mexico.

In charge of the areas of design and promotion he has worked and shared the stage with artists including: Mubali, Hyperfrequencies, Neuromotor, Deeper In Zen, Naked Tourist, Audiopathik, Christer, Unreal 303, Duendo Matka, Xikwri Neyrra, Skunks Of Satan, Master Pain, Kali Aritka, Chris Organix among others.

After co-hosting a rock show in the early 2000s (decade) on Radio Bemba XHCD-FM (now known as Zoom 95), a community radio station in Hermosillo, he started a new show "Trance Nation" (2005–2006) broadcasting music from the psytrance scene.

In 2007, Báalam started a new independent and underground record label "Caffix Records", dedicated to promoting psychedelic culture and new artists from the local scene and overseas.

Báalam has been featured in Mushroom Magazine's Top 10 DJ Charts.

== Record Labels ==
- Caffix Records (Mexico)

== Discography ==
Compilations

- VA - "DAYDREAM" 2008 (Caffix Records)
- VA - "INNER-BELIAL" 2009 (Caffix Records)
- VA - "K'AN AJAW" 2011 (Caffix Records)
