= KUJ =

KUJ may refer to:

- KUJ (AM), a radio station (1420 AM) licensed to Walla Walla, Washington, United States
- KUJ-FM, a radio station (99.1 FM) licensed to Burbank, Washington, United States
- Keeping up with the Joneses
- kuj, ISO 630 code for the Kuria language
