= WBKS (disambiguation) =

WBKS may refer to:

- WBKS, a radio station licensed to Columbus Grove, Ohio that held the call sign WBKS at 93.9 FM since 2010
- WIRO (FM), a radio station licensed to Ironton, Ohio that held the call sign WBKS at 107.1 FM from 2002 to 2010
- WTLC-FM, a radio station licensed to Greenwood, Indiana that held the call sign WBKS at 106.7 FM from 1998 to 2001
- Sandakan Airport, Malaysia (ICAO code WBKS)
