= WNIR =

WNIR could refer to:

- WNIR (FM), a radio station (100.1 FM) licensed to Kent, Ohio, United States
- WNIR-LP, a radio station (95.5 FM) licensed to Newberry, South Carolina, United States
- Wales National Ice Rink, Cardiff, United Kingdom
