= KJKB =

KJKB may refer to:

- KJKB (FM), a radio station (106.7 FM) licensed to serve Early, Texas, United States
- KTWF, a radio station (95.5 FM) licensed to serve Scotland, Texas, which held the call sign KJKB from 1996 to 2013
