= KXPN =

KXPN may refer to:

- KXPN (AM), a radio station (1460 AM) licensed to serve Kearney, Nebraska, United States
- KTWF, a radio station (95.5 FM) licensed to serve Scotland, Texas, United States, which held the call sign KXPN-FM from 2013 to 2020
