= KOME-FM =

- Tolar, Texas; United States
- Broadcast area: Granbury, Texas
- Frequency: 95.5 MHz
- Branding: K-Hits 95.5

Programming
- Format: Classic hits
- Affiliations: Compass Media Networks; Premiere Networks

Ownership
- Owner: Gerry Schlegel; (LKCM Radio Licenses, LP)
- Sister stations: KRVF, KFWR

History
- First air date: 2006
- Former call signs: KSCG (2006–2008)
- Former frequencies: 95.3 MHz (2006–2020)

Technical information
- Licensing authority: FCC
- Facility ID: 165950
- Class: C3
- ERP: 1,550 watts
- HAAT: 393 meters (1,289 ft)
- Transmitter coordinates: 32°07′39.50″N 97°52′38.90″W
- Repeater: 95.5 KTWF (Scotland)

Links
- Public license information: Public file; LMS
- Webcast: Listen live
- Website: khits955.com

KOME-FM (95.5 FM) is a radio station licensed to serve the community of Tolar, Texas. The station is owned by LKCM Radio Group, and is fully simulcast with its sister station 106.5 KITT in Meridian, Texas. KOME and KITT air a classic hits format.

The station was assigned the call sign KSCG by the Federal Communications Commission on October 10, 2006. The station changed its call sign to KOME-FM on July 18, 2008.
