= G100 =

G100 may refer to:

- Gulfstream G100, an Israeli aircraft
- WXYY, a radio station licensed to Rincon, Georgia, United States

G.100 may refer to:

- Martinsyde G.100, a British First World War fighter bomber aircraft
