= KNLT =

KNLT may refer to:

- KNLT (FM), a radio station (95.5 FM) licensed to serve Palmer, Alaska, United States
- KMVN, a radio station (105.7 FM) licensed to serve Anchorage, Alaska, which held the call sign KNLT from 2009 to 2012
- KKSR, a radio station (95.7 FM) licensed to serve Walla Walla, Washington, United States, which held the call sign KNLT from 1985 to 2008
