= KRVA =

KRVA may refer to:

- KRVA (AM), a radio station (1600 AM) licensed to Cockrell Hill, Texas, United States
- KRVA-FM, a radio station (107.1 FM) licensed to Campbell, Texas, United States
