= WLRX =

WLRX may refer to:

- WLRX (FM), a radio station (106.1 FM) licensed to Vinton, Virginia, United States
- WIRO (FM), a radio station (107.1 FM) licensed to Ironton, Ohio, United States, which held the call sign WLRX from 2010 to 2019
- WAYI, a radio station (104.3 FM) licensed to Charlestown, Indiana, United States, which held the call sign WLRX from 2005 to 2007
- WRDI, a radio station (95.7 FM) licensed to Charlestown, Indiana, which held the call sign WLRX from 1991 to 2005
- WTAX-FM, a radio station (93.9 FM) licensed to Sherman, Illinois, United States, which held the call sign WLRX from 1981 to 1986
