= DXSK-AM =

Philippine radio station

Radio Ranao (DXSK)
- Marawi; Philippines
- Broadcast area: Lanao del Norte and Lanao del Sur
- Frequency: 1593 kHz
- Branding: DXSK Radio Ranao

Programming
- Languages: Maranao, Cebuano
- Format: Community Radio

Ownership
- Owner: Ranao Radio Broadcasting and TV System Corporation
- Sister stations: 95.5 Cool FM

History
- First air date: 2001

Technical information
- Licensing authority: NTC
- Class: C, D and E
- Power: 5,000 watts
- ERP: 10,000 watts

DXSK (1593 AM) Radio Ranao is a radio station owned and operated by Ranao Radio Broadcasting and TV System Corporation. The station's studio is located at Brgy. Raya Saduc, Marawi. This serves as the community station for the Maranaos.
