= XHKN-FM =

Radio station in Huetamo, Michoacán

XHKN-FM XEKN-AM
- Huetamo, Michoacán; Mexico
- Frequencies: 720 AM; 95.5 FM
- Branding: La Raza

Programming
- Format: Regional Mexican

Ownership
- Owner: Grupo TREDI Radio; (Canales Radiofónicos, S.A.)

History
- First air date: November 15, 1969 (concession)

Technical information
- Power: 5 kW (AM)
- ERP: 25 kW (FM)
- Transmitter coordinates: 18°37′37″N 100°53′57″W

XHKN-FM/XEKN-AM is a radio station on 720 AM and 95.5 FM in Huetamo, Michoacán. It is owned by Grupo TREDI Radio and known as La Raza, which offers a Regional Mexican format.

== History ==
XEKN-AM 1490, a 250-watt daytimer, received its concession on November 15, 1969. In the 1980s, it increased power to 500 watts during the day and 250 at night, and again to 1 kW in the 1990s.

In the early 2000s, XEKN was moved to 720 kHz with 5 kW, and in 2012, it was cleared to migrate to FM as XHKN-FM on 95.5. However, it was required to maintain its AM frequency in operation.
