= WOEZ (FM) =

Radio station in Burton, South Carolina

- Burton, South Carolina; United States
- Broadcast area: Hilton Head metropolitan area
- Frequency: 93.7 MHz
- Branding: Easy FM 93.7

Programming
- Format: Soft adult contemporary

Ownership
- Owner: Saga Communications; (Saga South Communications, LLC)
- Sister stations: WLHH; WVSC

History
- First air date: April 19, 1991 (as WONO)
- Former call signs: WONO (1991–1996); WALI (1996–2017)
- Call sign meaning: EZ - Easy

Technical information
- Licensing authority: FCC
- Facility ID: 25206
- Class: C3
- ERP: 11,000 watts
- HAAT: 150 meters (490 ft)
- Transmitter coordinates: 32°25′11″N 80°28′30″W

Links
- Public license information: Public file; LMS
- Webcast: Listen Live
- Website: easyfmlive.com

WOEZ (93.7 MHz) is an FM radio station broadcasting a soft adult contemporary format and licensed to Burton, South Carolina, United States, and serving the Hilton Head metropolitan area. The station is currently owned by Saga Communications, through licensee Saga South Communications, LLC.

== History ==
The station went on the air as WONO on April 19, 1991. On May 15, 1996, the station changed its call sign to WALI.

WALI was owned by Hess Communications LLC.

Wally 93.7 played country music and had an alligator mascot. The station signed off in 2012. Palmetto Rural Telephone, through Premier Enterprises, LLC, bought the station on January 17, 2014, for $375,000 and changed it to hot adult contemporary "I93.7". Miles Crosby, called "Uncle Miles" on Charleston's WAVF played a major role in planning the new format and hosted the morning show, which included news and music as well as "Swap Shop". The music included Train, Adele, Edwin McCain and Darius Rucker. Other programming included high school football, Atlanta Braves baseball, Clemson football and NASCAR.

Effective May 1, 2017, Premier Enterprises sold WALI for $325,000 to Apex Media Corporation, which had plans to move WALI to Hilton Head. On May 24, 2017, WALI went silent.

Effective September 6, 2017, Saga Communications purchased WALI, seven of its sister stations, and four translators from Apex Media for $23 million. Coincident with the purchase, WALI changed their call letters to WOEZ and on September 6, 2017, WOEZ returned to the air with a soft adult contemporary format, branded as "Easy FM 93.7", previously heard on the HD2 channel of WVSC and its translators. On December 13, 2017, WOEZ moved from Walterboro to Burton, South Carolina.

On May 5, 2022, Saga Communications (parent of WOEZ) president and CEO Ed Christian revealed a new programming initiative which launched on this station in May 2022. Its purposes are to bring back overnight listening and help its listeners who have trouble sleeping. Much of the overnight hours (11 p.m. to 5 a.m. Eastern) will consist of nature sounds (e.g. gentle rain and thunder) with short sponsorships twice an hour. WOEZ is the prototype station for the nature sounds specialty programming now known as "EZ Sleep".
