= KTFW-FM =

Radio station in Fort Worth, Texas

Coordinates: 32.275°N 98.023°W

- Glen Rose, Texas; United States
- Broadcast area: Granbury; Stephenville; Glen Rose
- Frequency: 92.1 MHz
- Branding: 92.1 Hank FM

Programming
- Language: English
- Format: Country

Ownership
- Owner: LKCM Radio Group
- Sister stations: KFWR-FM, KRVF, KTWF

History
- First air date: 1989 (as KCLE)
- Former call signs: KCLE-FM (1989–1998)
- Call sign meaning: Texas, Fort Worth (station's headquarters)

Technical information
- Licensing authority: FCC
- Facility ID: 65314
- Class: C1
- ERP: 25,000 watts
- HAAT: 432 meters (1,417 ft)

Links
- Public license information: Public file; LMS
- Webcast: Listen Live
- Website: 921hankfm.com

KTFW-FM (92.1 MHz, branded as "Hank FM") is a country music radio station focusing on serving the western half of the Dallas–Fort Worth metroplex. Licensed to Glen Rose, Texas, United States, it strongly emphasizes classic, traditional, and neotraditional country music. The station is owned and operated by LKCM Radio Group, along with sister stations "95.9 The Ranch" in Jacksboro, Texas, and 106.9 The Ranch" in Corsicana, Texas. Although its office is located in downtown Fort Worth, its transmitter is located in Glen Rose, Texas.

== History ==
FC Dallas Major League Soccer games previously aired on KTFW.

Logo under previous slogan

By January 6, 2012, KTFW had tweaked its country format to include country music from the 1970s to present day and was rebranded as "Hank FM".

By September 2018, KTFW had rebranded as "Real Country 92.1 Hank FM" with the slogan: "Playing the best country from the 80's (sic) and 90's (sic) and George Strait every hour." It is the flagship station for Aledo Bearcats High School football and hosted the Gary Patterson Radio Show (Former Head Football Coach of the TCU Horned Frogs) during football season, typically on Thursday nights.
