= XHPCAR-FM =

Radio station in Ciudad del Carmen, Campeche, Mexico

- Ciudad del Carmen, Campeche; Mexico
- Frequency: 95.5 MHz
- Branding: La Comadre

Programming
- Format: Grupera

Ownership
- Owner: Grupo SIPSE; (Cancún Radio Net, S.A. de C.V.)

History
- First air date: April 2019
- Call sign meaning: Carmen

Technical information
- Class: B1
- ERP: 25 kW
- HAAT: 41.8 m
- Transmitter coordinates: 18°38′35.01″N 91°50′27.64″W

Links
- Webcast: Listen live
- Website: sipseplay.com

XHPCAR-FM is a radio station on 95.5 FM in Ciudad del Carmen, Campeche, Mexico. It is owned by Grupo SIPSE and known as La Comadre.

== History ==
XHPCAR was awarded in the IFT-4 radio auction of 2017. Grupo SIPSE paid 4.988 million pesos. The station signed on in April 2019.

In September 2022, Grupo SIPSE replaced Kiss FM format with a Grupera format known as La Comadre.
