= WLGC (AM) =

Greenup, Kentucky; United States
- Broadcast area: Huntington, West Virginia; Ashland, Kentucky
- Frequency: 1520 kHz

Ownership
- Owner: Greenup County Broadcasting, Inc.
- Sister stations: WLGC-FM

History
- First air date: May 30, 1984
- Last air date: February 1, 2017
- Former call signs: WLGC (1984–1989); WTCV (1989–1993)
- Call sign meaning: We Love Greenup County

Technical information
- Facility ID: 25223
- Class: D
- Power: 5,000 watts (days only); 280 watts (critical hours)
- Transmitter coordinates: 38°35′44″N 82°51′20″W

WLGC (1520 AM) was a radio station licensed to Greenup, Kentucky, United States, while their studios were located in Ashland, Kentucky. The station's transmitter, like WLGC-FM, was in Greenup. The station was owned by Greenup County Broadcasting, Inc.

== History ==
The station went on the air as WLGC on May 30, 1984. On July 17, 1989, the station changed its call sign to WTCV. However, they returned to the WLGC callsign on April 26, 1993.

On January 13, 2014, concurrent with WLGC-FM's rebranding as "Kool Hits 105.7", WLGC became an All-news radio format and was rebranded as "Kool Hits 105.7 NewsChannel". In addition to local news, the station also features news broadcasts from the Associated Press Radio Network and the Kentucky News Network.

At the request of licensee Greenup County Broadcasting, the Federal Communications Commission cancelled WLGC's over the air broadcasting license on February 1, 2017.
