= XHCMM-FM =

Radio station in Coalcomán, Michoacán, Mexico

- Coalcomán, Michoacán; Mexico
- Broadcast area: Colima, Colima
- Frequency: 95.5 MHz
- Branding: Ke Buena

Programming
- Format: Regional Mexican
- Affiliations: Radiópolis

Ownership
- Owner: Grupo Luna Medios; (Homero Bautista Duarte)

History
- First air date: February 11, 1994 (concession)
- Call sign meaning: Coalcomán, Michoacán

Technical information
- Class: C1
- ERP: 2.97 kW
- HAAT: 769.9 m
- Transmitter coordinates: 18°50′06.1″N 103°12′46.9″W

Links
- Website: lunamedios.mx

XHCMM-FM is a radio station on 95.5 FM in Coalcomán, Michoacán, broadcasting from atop Cerro El Mono. It serves as a rimshot into the Colima, Colima, radio market and carries the Ke Buena Regional Mexican national format from Radiópolis.

== History ==
XECMM-AM received its concession on February 11, 1994. It was owned by Francisco Bautista Valencia until 2001. Until taking on the Ke Buena format in 2017, XHCMM was originally known as Stereo Mass. The station temporarily shed the franchised format in August 2018, but returned to the Ke Buena format in December 2023.
