= WEMM-FM =

- Huntington, West Virginia; United States
- Broadcast area: Huntington, West Virginia; Charleston, West Virginia
- Frequency: 107.9 MHz
- Branding: Gospel 107.9

Programming
- Format: Southern Gospel; Religious

Ownership
- Owner: Bristol Broadcasting Company
- Sister stations: WNRJ

History
- First air date: 1971
- Former call signs: WEMM (1971–2004)
- Call sign meaning: W Dr. E. M. Mortenson (original owner)

Technical information
- Licensing authority: FCC
- Facility ID: 43860
- Class: B
- ERP: 50,000 Watts
- HAAT: 152 Meters
- Transmitter coordinates: 38°28′37.0″N 82°15′20.0″W

Links
- Public license information: Public file; LMS
- Webcast: WEMM-FM Webstream
- Website: WEMM-FM Online

WEMM-FM (107.9 FM, "Gospel 107.9") is a Southern Gospel and religious formatted broadcast radio station licensed to Huntington, West Virginia, serving the Huntington/Charleston area. WEMM-FM is owned and operated by Bristol Broadcasting Company.

== Programming ==
WEMM-FM broadcasts a Southern Gospel and Religious format to the Tri-State Region. This format includes sermons from area pulpits, national Bible teaching ministries, and Southern Gospel music. The station also airs a radio simulcast of the WSAZ NewsChannel 3 Six O'Clock newscast on weekdays.

== History ==
WEMM was first established on September 6, 1971, and has since then maintained its current Gospel format. The station signed on as the third station on the Tower of Faith Radio Network.

Former logo

The call letters were changed to WEMM-FM on February 2, 2004, when an AM sister station (then known as WHRD) was made a simulcast of the FM signal and its call sign was changed to WEMM. That simulcast arrangement ended and the AM station's callsign was changed to WRWB in September 2008 but the FM station remains at the WEMM-FM callsign.
