= WCXE-LP =

Erlanger, Kentucky; United States
- Frequency: 95.5 MHz
- Branding: ClassX Radio

Programming
- Format: Classic rock

Ownership
- Owner: SGM, Inc.

History
- Former call signs: WZFR-LP (2002–2010); WHKK-LP (2010–2012); WFKC-LP (2012–2014)
- Former frequencies: 97.7 MHz (?-2013); 105.5 MHz (2013–2014)

Technical information
- Licensing authority: FCC
- Facility ID: 135059
- Class: L1
- ERP: 53 watts
- HAAT: 41.1 meters
- Transmitter coordinates: 38°52′42″N 84°35′8″W

Links
- Public license information: LMS

WCXE-LP (95.5 FM) is an American low-power FM radio station licensed to serve the community of Erlanger, Kentucky. The station is currently owned by SGM, Inc.
