= XHCD-FM =

Community radio station in Hermosillo, Sonora, Mexico

- Hermosillo, Sonora; Mexico
- Frequency: 95.5 FM
- Branding: Zoom 95

Programming
- Format: Noncommercial community radio

Ownership
- Owner: Comunicadores del Desierto, A.C.

History
- First air date: November 11, 2000; May 31, 2005 (permit)
- Call sign meaning: Concessionaire Comunicadores del Desierto, A.C.

Technical information
- Licensing authority: CRT
- Class: AA
- ERP: 4.299 kW
- HAAT: 18.4 m (60 ft)
- Transmitter coordinates: 29°05′37.5″N 110°56′41″W

Links
- Webcast: Listen live
- Website: zoom95.com

XHCD-FM ("Zoom 95") is a community radio station in Hermosillo, Sonora, Mexico, broadcasting on 95.5 FM. It is owned by Comunicadores del Desierto, A.C. XHCD is a member of AMARC México.

== History ==
"Radio Bemba" took to the air on November 11, 2000, as a non-permitted station on 107.5 MHz, from facilities near the Universidad de Sonora where the station's founders were students. A year later, in 2001, a permit 107.5 FM was awarded to the university. While it was thought that this might help to regularize Radio Bemba's transmissions, the university launched XHUSH-FM, its own station, on the frequency instead. Radio Bemba moved to 103.3 MHz.

In September 2004, the Radio Bemba team began negotiating to obtain a permit for its radio station. On May 31, 2005, Comunicadores del Desierto, A.C., received the permit for XHCD-FM on 95.5 MHz.

The station changed its name to Zoom 95 sometime in the early 2010s.
