= KSST =

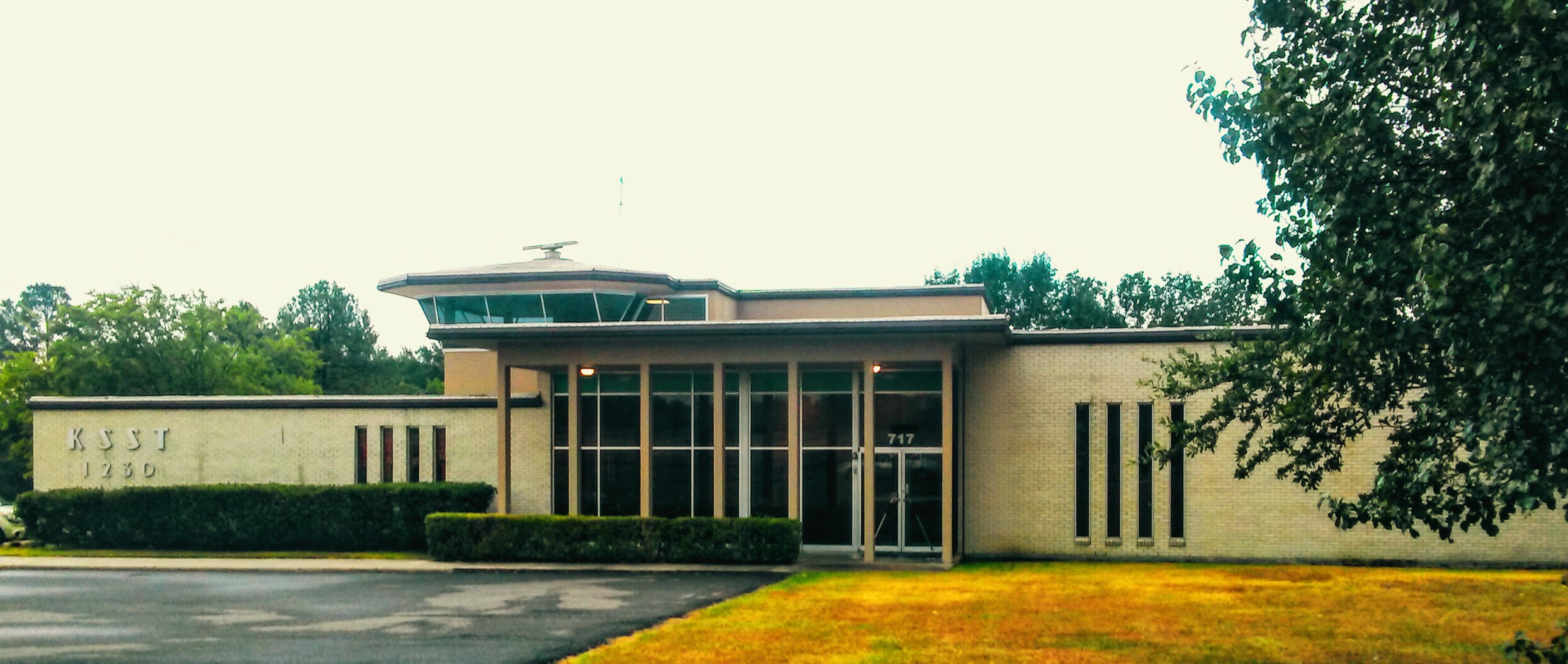
- KSST Studios
- Sulphur Springs, Texas; United States
- Broadcast area: Northeast Texas
- Frequency: 1230 kHz
- Branding: KSST 1230 AM

Programming
- Format: Oldies
- Affiliations: Westwood One

Ownership
- Owner: Chad Young; (Racy Properties, LLC.)

History
- First air date: March 1947
- Call sign meaning: K Sulphur Springs, Texas

Technical information
- Licensing authority: FCC
- Facility ID: 27630
- Class: C
- Power: 1,000 watts unlimited
- Transmitter coordinates: 33°7′0.00″N 95°35′5.00″W
- Translator: 101.3 K267CR (Sulphur Springs)

Links
- Public license information: Public file; LMS
- Website: ksstradio.com

KSST (1230 AM) is a radio station broadcasting an oldies format. Licensed to Sulphur Springs, Texas, United States, the station serves the Northeast Texas area. KSST features programming from Westwood One's Good Time Oldies satellite feed. The KSST facility also holds the Bill Bradford Memorial Broadcasting Museum.

== History ==
Howard Sterling Smith (1912–1988) and his wife, Charline Elizabeth "Charles" (née Luckey;" 1915–1912), were among the founders, and were the two who selected the call letters, "KSST."

On January 31, 2018, Racy Properties, LLC. requested a construction permit to add an FM translator to relay KSST. If granted and built, the FM station would operate on Channel 267 (101.3) at the maximum ERP of .25 kW, and an elevation of 47 meters, from the KSST tower on East Shannon Rd.
