= WUBB =

Coordinates: 32.227°N 80.848°W

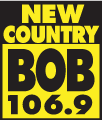
- Bluffton, South Carolina; United States
- Broadcast area: Hilton Head - Savannah metropolitan area
- Frequency: 106.9 MHz
- Branding: Bob 106.9

Programming
- Format: Country
- Affiliations: Premiere Networks

Ownership
- Owner: Dick Broadcasting; (Dick Broadcasting Company, Inc. of Tennessee)
- Sister stations: WFXH-FM, WGCO, WHHW, WRWN, WXYY

History
- Former call signs: WGZR (02/28/2003-02/21/2011); WWVV (05/08/1998-02/28/2003); WIJY (12/02/1996-05/08/1998); WLOW (10/28/1994-12/02/1996); WHHR-FM (01/31/1994-10/28/1994); WLOW (05/15/1987-01/31/1994)
- Call sign meaning: W U BoB

Technical information
- Facility ID: 16844
- Class: C1
- ERP: 100,000 watts
- HAAT: 244 meters (801 ft)

Links
- Webcast: Listen Live
- Website: bob1069.com

WUBB (106.9 FM) is a commercial radio station licensed to Bluffton, South Carolina, serving Savannah and Hilton Head. It is owned by Dick Broadcasting and it airs a country music format. In morning drive time, WUBB carries the syndicated Bobby Bones Show from Nashville.

WUBB is a Class C1 station. It has an effective radiated power (ERP) of 100,000 watts, the maximum for most FM stations. The transmitter tower is on Foreman Hill Road at Ulmer Road in Bluffton. The studios and offices are on Mall Boulevard in Savanah.

== History ==
=== Smooth Jazz, Hot AC and Adult Alternative ===
The station began with the call sign WIJY, broadcasting on 105.5 FM. At the time, 105.5 was a Class A frequency, which limited how many watts a station could use to broadcast.

In December, 1987, WIJY switched to 107.9 FM, allowing it to increase its power and coverage area. WIJY began airing what was then known as NAC or "new adult contemporary," a format that later became smooth jazz. In 1996, WIJY was moved to 106.9 as "Joy 106.9". In 1998, the station changed its call sign to WWVV-FM and became Modern AC as "Wave 106.9 - Your Hit Music Station."

It flipped to modern rock as "Wave 106.9 - Savannah's New Rock Alternative" in December 2000. Also in 2000, Triad Broadcasting purchased all Adventure Radio stations. The station flipped again in 2002 to Hot Adult Contemporary as "Wave 106.9 - The New Music Alternative." Another format adjustment came in 2003. It switched to Adult Album Alternative as "Modern Music - Wave 106.9".

That same year, 104.9 and 106.9 switched formats, with 106.9 becoming a country music station. It then adopted the call sign WGZR. The station was known as "Gator 106.9" until the week of March 12, 2007, when it rebranded to "Lucky Dog Country 106.9".

=== Bob 106.9 ===
WGZR again changed its moniker in late April 2008, to "Country 106.9". Another rebrand occurred February 21, 2011, at 1:06 PM when the station became "Bob 106.9" and changed its call sign to WUBB. Bob 106.9 was launched with a commercial-free "preview" for the rest of the day while Bob "redecorated" 106.9.

The first song on Bob 106.9 was My Kinda Party by Macon, Georgia, native Jason Aldean. The Georgia connection was important as WUBB targets parts of Georgia as well as South Carolina.

=== Changes in ownership ===
Effective May 1, 2013, L&L Broadcasting purchased WUBB and 29 other stations from Triad Broadcasting at a price of $21 million. L&L Broadcasting later merged into Alpha Media.

In September 2017, Dick Broadcasting announced the purchase of Alpha Media stations in three markets. The price tag for the 18 stations, including WUBB, was $19.5 million.
