= WFXH-FM =

Coordinates: 32.227°N 80.848°W

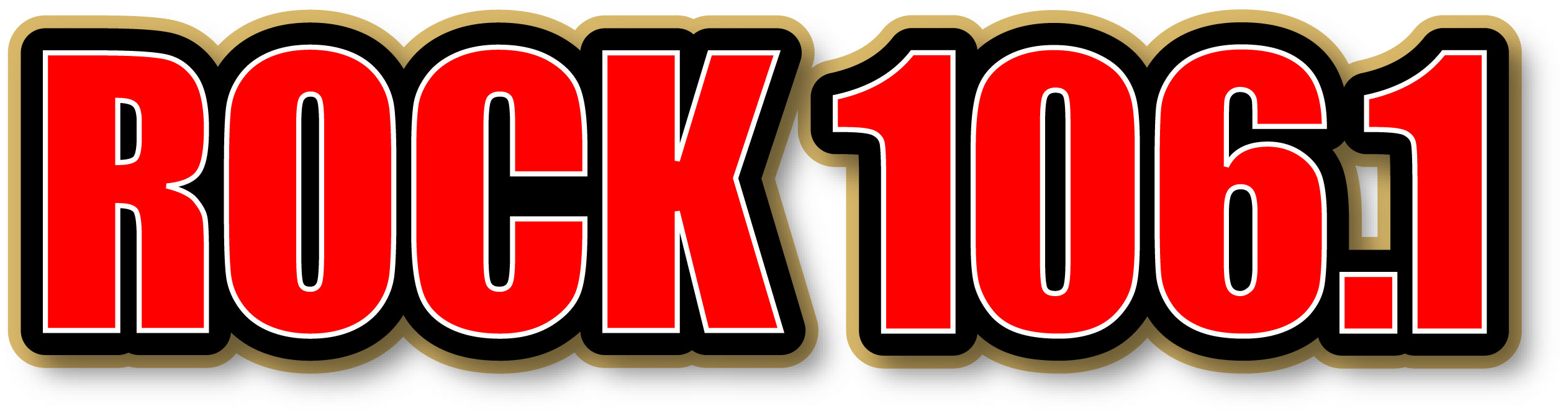
- Hilton Head Island, South Carolina; United States
- Broadcast area: Savannah, GA-Hilton Head Island, SC
- Frequency: 106.1 MHz
- Branding: Rock 106.1

Programming
- Format: Active rock

Ownership
- Owner: Dick Broadcasting; (Dick Broadcasting Company, Inc. of Tennessee)
- Sister stations: WGCO, WHHW, WRWN, WUBB, WXYY

History
- First air date: 1973 (as WHHR-FM at 106.3)
- Former call signs: WHHR-FM (1973-03/07/1991)
- Former frequencies: 106.3 MHz (1973–1990)
- Call sign meaning: W FoX Hilton Head, the Fox was the name of a classic rock station on the same frequency

Technical information
- Facility ID: 48367
- Class: C2
- ERP: 25,000 watts
- HAAT: 181 meters

Links
- Webcast: Listen live
- Website: rock1061.com

WFXH-FM (106.1 MHz), known as "Rock 106.1", is an active rock radio station targeted to Savannah, Georgia. The station was a monitored reporter on the Alternative (Modern Rock) panel. Formerly, WFXH-FM reported as an Alternative station to Arbitron and various radio industry publications. The station featured a specialty show called Underexposed, Sunday nights, 9-11 pm. During the show they spotlight indie rock artists like The Decemberists, The Shins, Yeah Yeah Yeahs, The Arcade Fire, and Cold War Kids, along with local acts. That show has apparently been cancelled, its presence excised from the station's website. In April 2008, WFXH-FM debuted You Heard It First, a new show heard weeknights at 11 pm that features only new rock, as part of what the station calls "New Rock Nights". Rock 106.1 also recently began streaming the station online at their website.

Rock 106.1 was also home to Lex and Terry who have dominated morning drive for a number of years. In September 2006, Rock 106.1 moved its main studios from Hilton Head Island to Savannah. The station (along with sister stations 103.1 the Drive and Lucky Dog Country 106.9) have studios and sales offices in both Savannah and Hilton Head; the only cluster in the market with this capability. The station's broadcast transmitter is near Bluffton, South Carolina.

The station's program director was former Operating Manager for Independence Media in Peoria and former WWCT Program Director Gabe Reynolds. Currently it is programmed by John Marshall since 2022.

Among WFXH-FM former staffers are Dustin Matthews (formerly with Alternative WFNX/Boston, now the Program Director at KTLK-FM (104.9 The Patriot)/St. Louis, as well as Director/Alternative Rock Programming for iHeartMedia’s St. Louis region and also PD of sister Alternative KDXA (ALT 106.3)/Des Moines.), Leslie Scott (who went from Adult Album Alternative KBXR/Columbia, Missouri to Adult Album Alternative KMTT/Seattle in February 2012) and Lexie Kaye (recently with Classic Hits WSRV/Atlanta).

2014 saw WFXH-FM take the ratings lead among Rock stations from WIXV-FM I95 95.5FM.

== History ==
The station originally signed on in 1973 as WHHR-FM on 106.3, playing beautiful music as "WHHR Easy 106 FM". WHHR-FM moved to 106.1 and upgraded from a class A to a class C2 in 1990, which allowed full coverage of the Savannah area. By March 1991, the station flipped from WHHR-FM to WFXH-FM, a satellite-fed classic rock station known as "Fox 106.1 - The Classic Rock Station".

On February 27, 2001, the station flipped to active rock as "Rock 106.1 - The Only Station That Really Rocks!" as a counterbalance to its sister station WWVV-FM 106.9 (now WUBB), which at the time was playing modern rock as "Wave 106.9 - Savannah's New Rock Alternative" and then as "Wave 106.9 - The New Music Alternative". In late 2002, the station rebranded as "Rock 106.1 - New Rock". A few months after this, the station returned to the active rock format.

In September 2008, the station was named Radio and Records Alternative Station of the Year for Markets 100+. (Savannah is radio market #157.)

As of 2011, the station is active rock (WFXH-FM was also moved to the Mediabase & Nielsen BDS Active Rock panels) and began throwing in Aerosmith, Black Sabbath & Judas Priest in the playlist. They have since removed a majority of the classic rock, minus a few titles.

In September 2017, Dick Broadcasting announced the purchase of Alpha Media stations in three markets.

In 2018, Lex and Terry were replaced with Two Guys Named Chris. Their show was moved to sister station WRWN in 2021.

== See also ==
- List of radio stations in Georgia (U.S. state)
- Georgia (U.S. state)
- Lists of radio stations in North and Central America
