= KYWY (FM) =

- Pine Bluffs, Wyoming; United States
- Broadcast area: Far Southeastern Wyoming
- Frequency: 95.5 MHz
- Branding: Freedom 95.5 FM

Programming
- Format: Religious

Ownership
- Owner: Eric Henderson; (E Media USA LLC)

History
- First air date: 2015
- Former call signs: KIHI (2011–2012); KEZF (2012–2014, 2014–2018); KGCO (2014)

Technical information
- Licensing authority: FCC
- Facility ID: 183353
- Class: C3
- ERP: 9,200 watts
- HAAT: 160 meters (520 ft)
- Transmitter coordinates: 41°21′29″N 104°07′47″W

Links
- Public license information: Public file; LMS
- Website: freedom95fm.com

KYWY (95.5 FM) is a radio station licensed to Pine Bluffs, Wyoming. The station is owned by Eric Henderson, through licensee E Media USA LLC. It carries a religious format. The station's tower is located near the town of Albin. The station goes by the name of "Freedom 95.5".

The station provides fringe coverage to Cheyenne, and far western Nebraska.

== History ==
The station is currently owned by Eric Henderson, through the licensee E Media USA LLC. Henderson's company, E Media USA LLC, acquired the station in a transaction that was reported in March 2019 for a price of $15,000. The seller was Michael Augustus' Dr. Michael Augustus Cultural and Musical Arts Foundation. The station was sold by the foundation that had acquired it in 2018 after a brief period of ownership, noting the maximum estimated value of the station was $100,000 at the time of its acquisition.

Prior to his involvement in radio ownership, Eric Henderson was noted in the outdoor media industry, holding positions such as National Sales Director of the Outdoor Trade Division for Active Interest Media and a Senior PR Account Manager for Backbone Media, with a background that included being a professional ski guide in Jackson, Wyoming.

The call sign KYWY was previously used briefly on the 92.9 FM frequency in Cheyenne from 2016 to 2017. That facility, licensed to Warren AFB, was owned by iHeartMedia and broadcast an Adult Contemporary format under the name "Star 92.9." The call letters were moved as part of a large market realignment involving multiple iHeartMedia stations in the Cheyenne and Fort Collins/Denver areas.
