= Audiopathik =

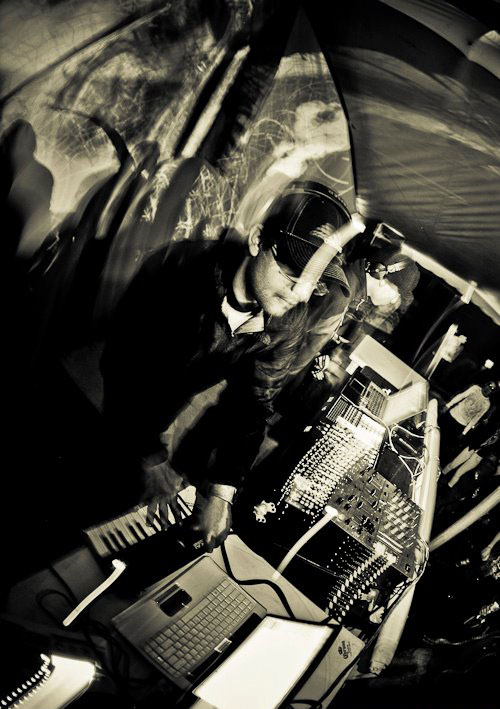

Background information
- Origin: Sonora, Mexico
- Genres: Dark Psytrance, Psychedelic trance, Experimental Hitech
- Years active: 2004-present
- Labels: Acidance Records, Pleiadian Records
- Website: audiopathik.com

Audiopathik is a dark psychedelic trance act from Sonora, Mexico.

== Biography ==
Their unique and distinctive sound, described by Mushroom Magazine as "fast, dark and twisted, but with humorous and even light moments shining through", has fueled the psytrance dancefloors worldwide since 2004.

They have released tracks on labels such as Devils Mind Records, Mass Abduction, Pleiadian Records, Hypnotica, Geomagnetic.tv, Shaman Films, 5th Element Records, Caffix Records, D-A-R-K Records, Dark Prisma, Planet B.E.N, amongst others.

Audiopathik is considered an avant-garde act in the dark psytrance scene.

== Discography ==
CD Album Releases

- Global Killer (Acidance Records, 2008) --- GREECE
- Over the Edge (Pleiadian Records, 2011) --- MEXICO

Compilations

- VA - DURDOM [Devils Mind Records] - "Corrosive Material" --- SWEDEN
- VA - DESERT ENCOUNTERS [Mass Abduction - "Chainsaw Massacre, Flesh" --- USA
- VA - AH PUCH [Shaman Films] - "Eye of the Beast" --- USA
- VA - BLAH [Hypnotica Records] - "Aversion Creation" --- SWEDEN
- VA - PROJECT DATA [Mass Abduction Records] - "There will be blood" --- USA
- VA - CYVILIZED CHAOS [Geomagnetic.tv] - "Speak of the devil" --- ISRAEL
- VA - THE NORDLAND ORCHESTRA [Dark Prisma] - "Lokutus Welcome"--- ARGENTINA
- VA - GRATEFUL DANCE [Geomagnetic.tv] - "Pandemoniak" --- USA
- VA - CHRONICLES [5th Element Records] - "Abraxas" --- MEXICO
- VA - TETAKAWI TALES [Pleiadian Records] - "Smells like a good idea" --- MEXICO
- VA - TRIP CONTROLLERS - [Geomagnetic.tv] - "Traumatik Amnesia" --- USA
- VA - EXTRATERRESTRIAL COMICS [Mass Abduction] - "Ala Verga" --- USA
- VA - CEREBRAL OVERLOAD [Mental Mechanix] - "Regis Inferni" --- AUSTRALIA
- VA - DIGITAL DRUGS 3 [Geomagnetic.tv] - "Juramento Malsano" --- USA
- VA - NO MERCY FOR THE WEAK [5th Element] - "4 da wicked" --- MEXICO
- VA - DANZA DEL VENADO [Pleiadian Records] - "sick music 4 sick people" --- MEXICO
- VA - RAINDROPS IN THE FOREST [Psybertribe Records] - "Sour Soul Syrup" --- USA
- VA - TRIP FORMATION [Triplag Music] - "Devil Making Faces" --- IRELAND
- VA - MISTERY OF NITZZY [5th Element Records] - "To be continued.." --- MEXICO
- VA - FREE TECHNODROME [Ulstravision Records] - "Freedom to dance" --- SPAIN
- VA - GOA TRANCE MISSIONS Vol.1 NIGHT [Goa Records] - "Traumatic Amnesia" --- USA
- VA - GUERREROS AZTECAS [Biomechanix Records] - "Brainscratcher" --- MEXICO
- VA - INNER BELIAL [Caffix Records] - "Malleus Maleficarum" --- MEXICO
- VA - OPTOPLANAR [Urban Antidote Records] - "Brain Melt" --- ALEMANIA
- VA - PLEIADIAN CONNECTION [Pleiadian Records] - "Killin Machin', Teletracer" --- MEXICO
- VA - PSYCHOSOMATIC- [Digital Drugs Coalition] "Stutter" --- USA
- VA - ZAMURAI [Rockdenashi Records] - "De* VAstation" --- JAPAN
- VA - TEN REASONS TO EAT DUST [5th Element] - "Bass Rider", "Machete" --- MEXICO
- VA - TANETSVETA [Tantrumm Records] - "R. U. Happy" --- USA in collaboration with PSYKOVSKY (Russia)
- VA - FALSE CENTER [Lamat Records] - "Geez" --- GUATEMALA
- VA - THE MUSHROOM SPEAKS [Lamat Records] - "Slaughterhouse RMX" --- GUATEMALA
- VA - UNIVERUS A UM [Kamino Records] - "Mind Meld" "Rich Pitch" --- MEXICO
- VA - PYTAGOREAN [Acidance Records] - "Hiroshi* VA" - GREECE
- VA - AUDITORY CODE [Pleiadian Records] - "Inner Decoder" - MEXICO
- VA - WAQT HA PSY KA [Namo Records] - "This is the Sound" - OMAN
- VA - SYNTHETIC LIFEFORMS [Damaru Records] - "Crazy Diamond" - GERMANY
- VA - EXTRA SOLAR PLANETS [Maniac Psycho Pro] - "Concentrate" - ISRAEL
- VA - BLASTED FREAKS [Freak Records] - "Blasting Donkeys" - SWITZERLAND
- VA - ALCHEMY OF SOUNDS [Disco Valley Records] - "Anihilated (Audiopathik Rmx)" - INDIA
- VA - DOUBLE TROUBLE [Black Out Records] - "Right Now" - GERMANY
- VA - STAR BEINGS [Pleiadian Records] - "Interdimensional", "Free Your Mind", "Modulation Orgy" - MEXICO
- VA - NAMOTRON [Namo Records] - "Spectral Classification" - OMAN
- VA - CHEMICAL MONSTERS 2 [ManiacPsychoPro] - "To the Stars" - ISRAEL
- VA - PSYLORDS [Warromaja Records] - "Quantum Void", "Psylords" - BELGIUM
- VA - EL NIMR [Namo Records] - "Everything is possible" - INDIA
- VA - STAR BEINGS 2 [Pleiadian Records] - "Knob Twisters", "OMG", "Ultimate Reality" - MEXICO

Digital Releases

- EP - NECRO [D-A-R-K Records] -- Canada
- EP - ANGER AUDIO [D-A-R-K Records] -- Canada
- VA - GRIMORIUM VERUM [USOE] - "Harum Scarum, Les Tenebres"—Macedonia
- VA - CIRCLES OF LIFE - [Mind Expansion Records] - "Dead Overflow"—Alemania
- VA - GENERATION OF PSYTRANCE 3 [PLANET BEN] - vs Mexican Trance Mafia "Sell your soul"—Germany
- VA - DOUBLE THE DOSE Vol. 2 - [Digital Drugs Coalition] "Stutter" --- USA
- VA - DAMAGED BRAIN - [Ultravision Records] - "Dirty Lil beast"—Spain

== Notes ==
=== External links ===
- Audiopathik website
- Audiopathik on Facebook
- Audiopathik on Soundcloud
- Audiopathik on Instagram
- Audiopathik Discography at Discogs
- Audiopathik on iTunes
