= KUJ (AM) =

- Walla Walla, Washington; United States
- Broadcast area: Athena, Oregon; Dayton, Washington; Pendleton, Oregon
- Frequency: 1420 kHz
- Branding: KUJ 1420 AM

Programming
- Format: News/Talk

Ownership
- Owner: Alexandra Communications
- Sister stations: KNHK-FM

History
- First air date: December 3, 1926 (first license granted)
- Former call signs: KGEA (1926)

Technical information
- Licensing authority: FCC
- Facility ID: 35718
- Class: B
- Power: 5,000 watts day 900 watts night
- Transmitter coordinates: 46°4′1.5″N 118°24′8.9″W
- Translator: 98.7 K254DK (Walla Walla)

Links
- Public license information: Public file; LMS

KUJ (1420 AM) is a radio station licensed to Walla Walla, Washington, United States. The station is currently owned by Alexandra Communications. It features a news/talk format. The station has obtained a construction permit from the FCC for a power increase to 10,000 watts during the day.

== History ==
The station was initially licensed, as KGEA, on December 3, 1926, to the Puget Sound Radio Broadcasting Co. at 5811 Fifth Avenue, Northeast, in Seattle. The original call letters were randomly assigned from an alphabetical roster of available call signs; moreover, the station's call letters were immediately changed to KUJ.

KUJ first went on the air in early 1927. The station subsequently received new owners,(Fred W. Lovejoy & R. H. Kerfoot) and was moved to Longview, Washington on May 12th 1928. It remained on the air in Longview during 1928 and 1929, which was then leased to the Columbia Broadcasting System (CBS), which began operating the station.

In November 1930, the ownership of KUJ was acquired by a Portland, Oregon broadcaster Paul R. Heitmeyer, who made arrangements to move KUJ from Longview to Walla Walla, although he did not specify when the move would take place. At that time, KUJ operated with a power of 100 watts. Heitmeyer subsequently announced the acquisition of a radio tower and the plan to put KUJ on the air in Walla Walla in mid-January 1931. The new station made its official debut as a Walla Walla station on Saturday January 17, 1931.

During the early 1930s, KUJ broadcast programs that were focused on performers and guest speakers who lived in the Walla Walla area. In addition to musical performances, the station also broadcast educational programs, some religious broadcasts, talent shows, programs aimed at homemakers, local news and sports, and other programs typical of that era. At some time circa 1933, Heitmeyer sold KUJ, although this was not widely announced at the time. It was acquired by Louis Wasmer, who owned KHQ in Spokane. Wasmer divested from the station in June 1934, selling it to H. E. (Herbert) Studebaker, who also co-owned KRLC in Lewiston, Idaho. Under the new ownership, KUJ's programming did not change substantially, and in 1938, it received permission to increase its power from 100 watts to 250 watts. In September 1940, the Federal Communications Commission (FCC) authorized the station to move to 1390 kHz, with a power of 1,000 watts.

In March 1941, the FCC, with the implementation of the North American Regional Broadcasting Agreement, moved several radio stations to new frequencies, and KUJ was assigned to 1420 kHz.

Herbert E. Studebaker announced that he was selling KUJ in February 1958 to Vernon W. Emmerson, a California businessman who had formerly worked at KUJ during the early 1940s. However, at the last minute, Emmerson seems to have decided not to go forward, and the sale was cancelled. Studebaker continued as KUJ's owner.

In March 1963, KUJ became an affiliate of the CBS Radio Network. The station had not been affiliated with any network previous to this. KUJ was operating with 5,000 watts, and it remained at 1420 on the AM band. In the late 1960s, Studebaker still owned 56% of the station, and was again in the process of seeking new owners. In November 1968, he reached an agreement to sell KUJ to a group led by Laverne (Verne) D. Russell and Barbara L. Russell. Verne Russell was KUJ's assistant manager at that time, and he took over ownership of the station.

In the 1970s, KUJ had a Top-40 music format with such personalities as Jockey John, Wee Willie Winkle, Kent Phillips (now one half of the Kent & Alan team at KPLZ-FM in Seattle), Bobby Dancer, Mason Dixon (a.k.a. Larry Brown), Ivanhoe, Chuck Taylor and C. Hamilton Banks. Conservative radio hosts Glenn Beck and Bob Larson, now a reporter at KIRO-FM in Seattle, did stints at KUJ. Las Vegas TV personality Dana Wagner also had a stint at KUJ.

The station went through several station changes due to receiving new ownership and different calls such as the former one KGEA. Their stations were 1240 kHz in December 1926 while owned by Puget Sound Radio Broadcasting co. 1500 kHz while owned by Fred W. Lovejoy & R. H. Kerfoot May 12th 1928-January 1929. 1390 kHz on may 29th 1941 after it was owned by Columbia Valley Broadcasting co. Then lastly 1420 kHz from March 29th 1941-2012
