= KZAT-FM =

- Belle Plaine, Iowa; United States
- Frequency: 95.5 MHz
- Branding: Radio Z

Programming
- Format: Spanish AC

Ownership
- Owner: Camrory Broadcasting, Inc.

History
- First air date: May 30, 1997

Technical information
- Licensing authority: FCC
- Facility ID: 14846
- Class: A
- ERP: 4,400 watts
- HAAT: 117 meters (384 ft)
- Transmitter coordinates: 41°56′35″N 92°23′51″W

Links
- Public license information: Public file; LMS
- Webcast: Listen live
- Website: radioz955.com

KZAT-FM (95.5 FM) is a radio station broadcasting a Spanish adult contemporary music format. Licensed to Belle Plaine, Iowa, United States, the station is currently owned by Grupo Roble Inc.
