= WNGR-LP =

- Tigerville, South Carolina; United States
- Frequency: 95.5 MHz
- Branding: The Vibe

Programming
- Format: Christian alternative rock

Ownership
- Owner: North Greenville University

Technical information
- Licensing authority: FCC
- Facility ID: 131638
- Class: L1
- ERP: 100 watts
- HAAT: 0.7 meters (2.3 ft)
- Transmitter coordinates: 35°4′12″N 82°22′20″W

Links
- Public license information: LMS
- Website: wngrradio.com

WNGR-LP (95.5 FM, "The Vibe") is a radio station broadcasting a Christian alternative rock format. Licensed to Tigerville, South Carolina, United States, the station is owned by North Greenville University.

WNGR radio is a student-body run product of North Greenville University. At 95.5 "the Vibe," listeners will find a blend of Christian music ranging from many different styles and genres all with a Christ-centered message. WNGR plays mainstream popular music to keep fans of well-known music satisfied but also plays relatively unknown music by obscure Christian artists and bands to expose listeners to fresh new music.

== History ==
WNGR began in 1996 as WNGC 90.5 "The Buzz". After three years of growth, the station became 92.9 WCMD. WCMD was chosen as an acronym for the school's tag line, "Where Christ Makes the Difference." In 2002, under the leadership of Dr. Linwood Hagin and Station Manager Kris Meade, the station became WNGR 95.5 "The Vibe".
