= KJYR =

Radio station in Newport, Washington

- Newport, Washington; United States
- Broadcast area: Spokane metropolitan area
- Frequency: 104.5 MHz
- Branding: Joy 104.5

Programming
- Format: Christian adult contemporary

Ownership
- Owner: Growing Christian Foundation

History
- First air date: 1990
- Former call signs: KMJY-FM (1989–2005); KQQB-FM (2005–2010); KGZG-FM (2010–2014); KNHK-FM (2014–2021); KZIU-FM (2021–2022)
- Call sign meaning: "Joy Radio"

Technical information
- Licensing authority: FCC
- Facility ID: 29911
- Class: C1
- ERP: 87,000 watts
- HAAT: 319 meters (1,047 ft)
- Transmitter coordinates: 48°23′8.6″N 117°14′18.7″W
- Repeater: 104.5 KJYR-FM1 (Spokane)

Links
- Public license information: Public file; LMS
- Webcast: Listen live
- Website: 1045joyfm.com

KJYR (104.5 MHz) is a non-profit FM radio station licensed to Newport, Washington, and serving the Spokane metropolitan area. The station is owned by the Growing Christian Foundation, and broadcasts a Christian adult contemporary radio format.

KJYR has an effective radiated power (ERP) of 87,000 watts. Its transmitter is on Moon Hill in Cusick, Washington, near the Pend Oreille River. Because its tower is about 50 miles north of Spokane, KJYR also has translators in Spokane, Chewelah, Colville and Sand Point, Idaho. They all operate on 104.5 MHz.

== History ==
=== Launch ===
In July 2005, Radio Station KMJY, LLC, reached an agreement to sell the station to ProActive Communications, Inc. The deal was approved by the Federal Communications Commission (FCC) on September 1, 2005, and the transaction was consummated on September 28, 2005.

KQQB-FM was one of two rhythmic contemporary outlets serving the Spokane metropolitan area when it signed on in December 2005 (KEZE was the other). In December 2006, it re-imaged as "Live 104.5" and shifted away from its rhythmic lean for a somewhat more mainstream direction. In June 2008, the station fell silent for nearly a full year.

On June 5, 2008, All Access reported that KQQB-FM and KAZZ were taken off the air. No reason was given for the abrupt sign-off, but whatever issue took the stations dark was "in court", although there were no details as to what those issues were. According to messages posted at Radio-Info.com, there were issues detailing the sale of both stations that resulted in former owners Radio Station KMJY, LLC, going to court to regain control after Proactive Communications defaulted on paying the final $1 million of a $6 million deal. Radio Station KMJY, LLC, then obtained a court order to seize the equipment from the studio and the station tower.

According to the FCC database, the station went silent on June 4, 2008, and on June 16, 2008, applied for special temporary authority to "remain silent", which was granted on August 27, 2008. The reason given in the application was "A secured creditor has seized transmitting equipment necessary to the operation of the station." This special temporary authority was scheduled to expire on February 24, 2009. The FCC accepted an application for an extension of this stay-silent authority on February 2, 2009. Per the FCC notification, the broadcast license of KQQB-FM would have automatically expired as a matter of law if broadcast operations did not resume by 12:01 a.m. on June 5, 2009.

=== Service restored ===
In a June 2009 filing with the FCC, KQQB-FM said that it resumed broadcasting shortly before the deadline but that it began "experiencing program delivery problems" and fell silent again on June 3, 2009. The licensee attested that it was working on an alternative method of program delivery so that it may "return the station to broadcast service". The FCC accepted this new application for authorization to remain silent but, as of July 23, 2009, had taken no further action.

Cube 104.5 Logo (2009–2010)

In September 2009, the station returned to the air with a rhythmic contemporary music format branded as "Cube 104.5".

=== 104.5 Jamz KGZG-FM ===
Pendleton Broadcasting announced they would enter under a lease management and purchase agreement (LMA) with KMJY, LLC in May 2010 and relaunched KQQB-FM's rhythmic CHR format as "104.5 JAMZ" on June 1, 2010. The station's call sign changed to KGZG-FM on June 16, 2010. The station was noted for having a wide variety of hits and hip hop music, including breaking new music that other rhythmic stations in the country would not play, as well as having no on-air personalities or syndicated shows. On April 1, 2014, KGZG-FM's four-year LMA agreement ended and was not renewed by Pendleton Broadcasting. KMJY then took the station silent while waiting for a new purchase offer and new ownership. Pendleton has since moved the station's format to an Internet radio station.

=== 104.5 Hank-FM ===
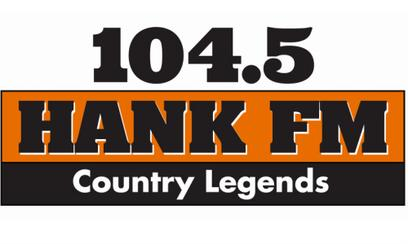
Former logo as Hank FM, 2014-2021

On December 11, 2014, KGZG-FM returned to the air under a new LMA with Alexandra Communications, as they launched a classic country format as "104.5 Hank FM". The launch also gave Spokane its fourth country outlet. On December 1, 2014, KGZG-FM changed its call sign to KNHK-FM.

=== Joy 104.5 ===
In July 2021, KNHK and sister station KYOZ was sold by Legend Broadcasting to Xana Oregon, LLC. In turn, Xana Oregon resold KNHK to the Growing Christian Foundation, owner of the Positive Life Radio network.

In October 2021, KNHK began stunting with Christmas music as All Christmas 104.5. Shortly afterward, the station also changed its call letters to KZIU-FM, exchanging with a Hank FM-branded country station in Weston, Oregon.

On January 1, 2022, the station flipped to Christian adult contemporary as Joy 104.5, and began identifying itself with the new call letters KJYR.

== Translators ==
Broadcast translator for KJYR
| Call sign | Frequency | City of license | FID | ERP (W) | Class | FCC info |
|---|---|---|---|---|---|---|
| KJYR-FM1 | 104.5 FM | Spokane, Washington | 159514 | 2,000 | D | LMS |
