= DXSK-FM =

Cool FM (DXSK)
Marawi; Philippines
- Broadcast area: Lanao del Norte and Lanao del Sur
- Frequency: 95.5 MHz
- Branding: 95.5 Cool FM

Programming
- Languages: Maranao, Cebuano
- Format: Community Radio

Ownership
- Owner: Ranao Radio Broadcasting and TV System Corporation
- Sister stations: DXSK Radio Ranao

History
- First air date: 2001
- Former frequencies: 94.5 MHz

Technical information
- Licensing authority: NTC
- Class: C, D and E
- Power: 5,000 watts
- ERP: 10,000 watts

DXSK (95.5 FM), broadcasting as 95.5 Cool FM, is a radio station owned and operated by Ranao Radio Broadcasting and TV System Corporation. The station's studio is located at Brgy. Raya Saduc, Marawi.
