= WRWN =

- Port Royal, South Carolina; United States
- Broadcast area: Hilton Head Island; Savannah metropolitan area
- Frequency: 107.9 MHz
- Branding: Rewind 107.9

Programming
- Format: Classic hits
- Affiliations: Jacksonville Jaguars Radio Network

Ownership
- Owner: Dick Broadcasting; (Dick Broadcasting Company, Inc. of Tennessee)
- Sister stations: WFXH-FM, WGCO, WHHW, WUBB, WXYY

History
- First air date: June 1988
- Former call signs: WTOI (1987); WIJY (1987–1996); WIJY-FM (1996); WLOW (1996–2011); WXYY (2011–2014)
- Former frequencies: 106.9 MHz (1988–1995)
- Call sign meaning: Rewind

Technical information
- Facility ID: 72387
- Class: C2
- ERP: 24,000 watts
- HAAT: 221 meters (725 ft)
- Transmitter coordinates: 32°13′36.0″N 80°50′53.0″W

Links
- Webcast: Listen live
- Website: rewind1079.com

WRWN (107.9 FM, "Rewind 107.9") is a commercial radio station licensed to Port Royal, South Carolina, United States, and serving Hilton Head Island and the Savannah metropolitan area. It airs a classic hits format and is owned by Dick Broadcasting, through licensee Dick Broadcasting Company, Inc. of Tennessee. The studios and offices are on Mall Boulevard in Savannah.

WRWN's transmitter is sited on Ulmer Road in Bluffton, South Carolina.

== History ==
=== Early years ===
The station signed on the air in February 1988. The original call sign was WLOW. It broadcast on 107.1 FM and played big bands, one of the few FM stations to play this style of music.

For much of 1994, the station became WHHR-FM, airing a talk radio format as "The News and Conversation Station". Listeners asked for the return of the nostalgia format, which had found a home on 99.7 FM. WLOW began playing big bands again in December, 1994.

=== Frequency switch ===
In 1995, Adventure Radio purchased it and upgraded it to a Class C1 station. WLOW traded frequencies with WIJY at 107.9. Over the years, the music evolved into adult standards with some smooth jazz at night. The standards format continued through late 2005 as "WLOW 107.9 - Good Times, Great Memories" until October 2005. It switched to all-Christmas music during the 2005 holiday season. After the holidays, WLOW rebranded itself and launched a new format, a Soft Adult Contemporary sound as "Familiar Favorites - 107.9 The Coast". Although the new format was similar to the previous WLOW, it featured more recent material, from artists such as Lionel Richie, The Bee Gees, The Beach Boys, Marvin Gaye, Gloria Estefan, and Fleetwood Mac. Smooth jazz was played at night.

After stunting with an all Irish music format as "Shamrock 107.9" on St. Patrick's Day, WLOW flipped from Soft AC to Hot AC as Y107.9 - "90's, 2K, & Today!" on March 18, 2011. The call sign was also changed to WXYY.

The new station was programmed by Brad Wells. In less than two years on 107.9, it raised thousands of dollars for "Susan G. Komen for the Cure" in Coastal Georgia. It also collected over 4,000 gifts for the area United States Marine Corps Toys for Tots Drive.

=== Rewind 107.9 ===
On March 14, 2014, WXYY's call letters and format were moved to the stronger 100.1 signal as "Y100". 107.9's call sign was changed to WRWN, which stunted again with an all-Irish music format as "Shamrock 107.9". The stunting ended March 18, 2014, when WRWN launched a classic hits format branded as "Rewind 107.9".

In September 2017, Dick Broadcasting announced the purchase of Alpha Media stations in three markets, including the purchase of "Rewind 107.9."

On November 1, 2022, WRWN switched to Christmas music as "Christmas 107.9" for the first time, before returning to the Classic Hits format on December 26.

== Previous logos ==
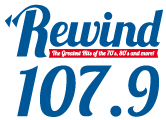
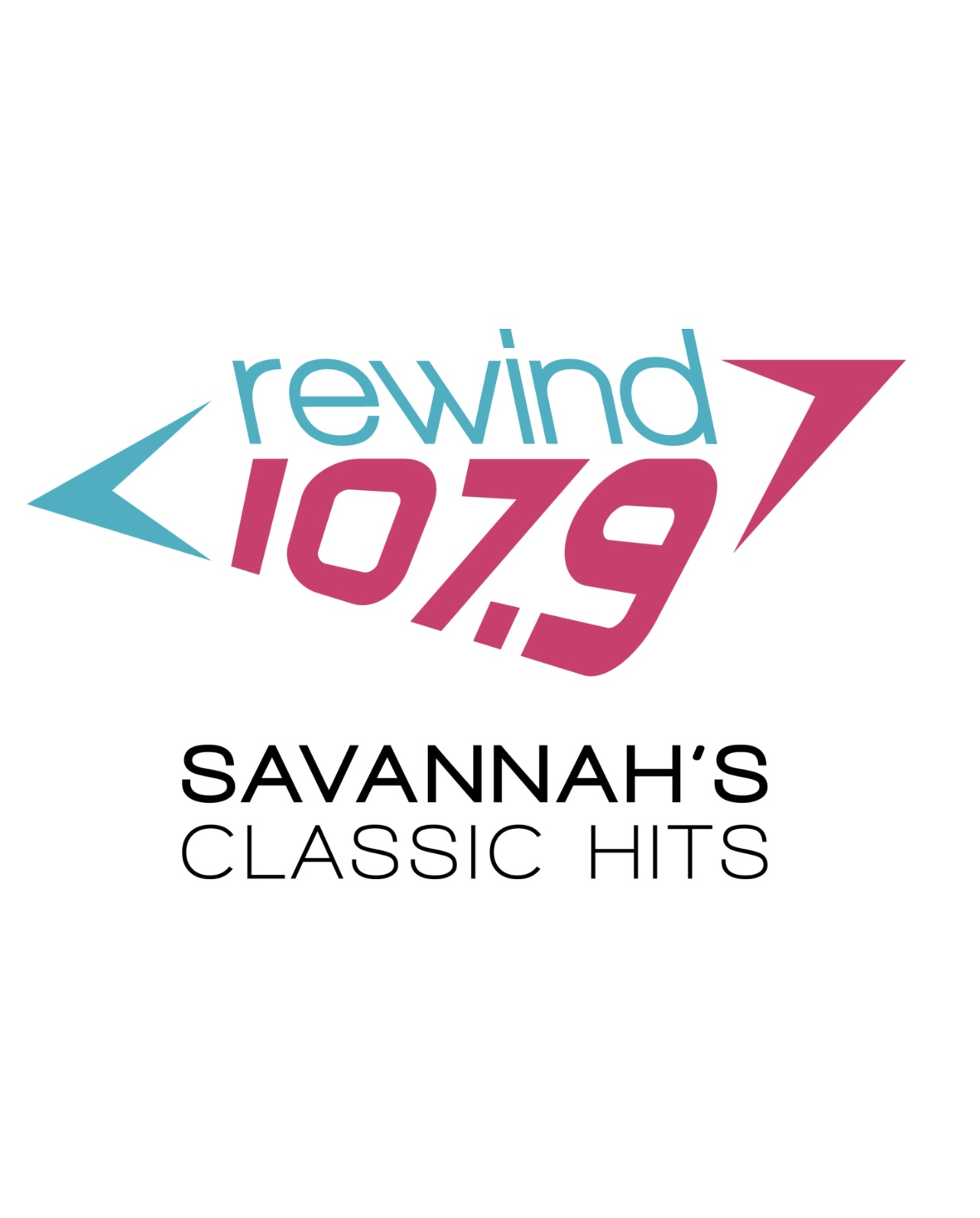
