= KRVG =

- Glenwood Springs, Colorado; United States
- Broadcast area: Aspen, Colorado; Glenwood Springs, Colorado
- Frequency: 95.5 MHz
- Branding: The River

Programming
- Format: Adult hits
- Affiliations: Westwood One

Ownership
- Owner: Western S Communications, L.L.C.

History
- First air date: 2001

Technical information
- Licensing authority: FCC
- Facility ID: 88077
- Class: C2
- ERP: 1,000 watts
- HAAT: 736.4 meters (2,416 ft)
- Transmitter coordinates: 39°25′5″N 107°22′1″W
- Translators: 102.7 K274AT (Aspen); 106.3 K292CY (Rifle)
- Repeater: 95.5 KRVG-FM1 (West Glenwood)

Links
- Public license information: Public file; LMS
- Website: wscradio.net

KRVG (95.5 FM, "The River") is a radio station broadcasting an adult hits music format. It is licensed to Glenwood Springs, Colorado, United States. The station is currently owned by Western S Communications, L.L.C. and features programming from Westwood One.
