= WCPL-LP =

- Merritt Island, Florida; United States
- Broadcast area: Melbourne, Florida
- Frequency: 95.5 MHz

Programming
- Language: English
- Format: Contemporary Christian

Ownership
- Owner: First Baptist Church of Merritt Island

Technical information
- Licensing authority: FCC
- Facility ID: 133184
- Class: L1
- ERP: 100 watts
- HAAT: 28.0 m (92 ft)
- Transmitter coordinates: 28°21′21.00″N 80°42′8.00″W

Links
- Public license information: LMS
- Website: www.wcplfm.com

WCPL-LP (95.5 FM) is a radio station licensed to Merritt Island, Florida. it airs a Contemporary Christian radio format, the station serves the Melbourne, Florida, area. and its owned by First Baptist Church of Merritt Island. As of October, 2011, Mr. David Crawford is the station manager.
