= WMFH-LP =

- Columbus, Mississippi; United States
- Broadcast area: Southwest of Columbus
- Frequency: 95.5 MHz
- Branding: Classic Book Radio

Programming
- Format: Radio Reading Service
- Affiliations: LibriVox

Ownership
- Owner: Classic Book Radio Corporation

History
- First air date: March 21, 2016

Technical information
- Licensing authority: FCC
- Facility ID: 192662
- Class: L1
- ERP: 82 watts
- HAAT: 22.2 meters (73 ft)
- Transmitter coordinates: 33°26′1.40″N 88°29′54.10″W

Links
- Public license information: LMS
- Webcast: Listen live
- Website: www.wmfhlp.org

WMFH-LP is a Radio Reading Service formatted broadcast radio station. The station is licensed to Columbus, Mississippi, but is heard southwest of the city proper. WMFH-LP is owned and operated by Classic Book Radio Corporation.

== History ==
The station signed on the air on March 21, 2016.

WMFH-LP was started primarily because of Lowndes County's very low education level. Station founder and CEO Christopher Howard said the station "can be an important tool or introducing people to the large body of quality English literature they might not otherwise experience, including timeless works from Aesop to Melville and from Shakespeare to Mark Twain."

Howard also began a fundraising campaign using Indiegogo to raise funds for the station. The station's goal was $10,000 to purchase the station's equipment, which included studio gear, an Emergency Alert System encoder/decoder, transmitter, and a streaming hosting service. The first book read on the station was "Pride and Prejudice" by Jane Austen.
