= WVSC (FM) =

Radio station in Port Royal, South Carolina, USA

Coordinates: 32.227°N 80.848°W

- Port Royal, South Carolina; United States
- Broadcast area: Hilton Head metropolitan area
- Frequency: 103.1 MHz (HD Radio)
- Branding: SC 103.1

Programming
- Format: Adult hits
- Subchannels: HD2: Pure Oldies 106.5 & 99.1 (Oldies)

Ownership
- Owner: Saga Communications; (Saga South Communications, LLC)
- Sister stations: WLHH; WOEZ

History
- First air date: 1985 (as WGCQ on 92.1)
- Former call signs: WGCQ (1985–1987); WBHH (1987–1990); WOCW (1990–1997); WLWS (1997); WGZO (1997–2014)
- Former frequencies: 92.1 MHz (1985–1999)
- Call sign meaning: W V South Carolina

Technical information
- Facility ID: 49910
- Class: C3
- ERP: 11,000 watts
- HAAT: 114.9 meters (377 ft)
- Translators: HD2: 99.1 W256CB (Beaufort); HD2: 106.5 W293BZ (Hilton Head)

Links
- Webcast: Listen Live; Listen Live (HD2)
- Website: sc103radio.com lowcountryoldies.com (HD2)

WVSC (103.1 MHz) is an adult hits formatted FM radio station licensed to Port Royal, South Carolina, United States and serving the Hilton Head Island metropolitan area and parts of South Carolina Lowcountry.

== History ==
The station signed on in 1985 on 92.1 with a 3,000-watt signal broadcasting from St. Helena Island, about 10 miles east of Beaufort. Because it was so close to WSGA-FM on 92.3, the station was limited in its transmitter power. In 1999, the station swapped frequencies with WBHC-FM on 103.1 to get a better signal into Savannah. The station has difficulties reaching listeners in Savannah because of its inferior signal. In January 2006 the station was given permission by the Federal Communications Commission (FCC) to move its tower closer to Savannah.

On November 11, 2013, L & L Broadcasting sold WGZO to Apex Broadcasting; this marks Apex Broadcasting's first entry into the Savannah/Hilton Head market. The sale, at a price of $450,000, was consummated on January 8, 2014.

On February 15, 2014, WGZO changed callsigns to WVSC. On February 21, 2014, WVSC changed formats to variety hits, branded as "SC 103".

In early 2017, Apex Broadcasting sold their radio stations in Charleston and Hilton Head, South Carolina to Saga Communications for $23 million. At that time, the HD2 channel and its translators 99.1 W256CB and 106.5 W293BZ played soft adult contemporary music, which later moved to WOEZ. The sale was consummated on September 1, 2017.

== Programming ==
Previous formats and call signs include:

- WGCQ: 1985–1987
- WBHH: 1987–1990
- WOCW: 1990–1997. Station was owned by local car dealer O.C. Welch and broadcast an oldies format.
- WGZO: 1997–1999. Station simulcasted with Georgia station WGCO as oldies
- 1999 Frequency change to 103.1
- WGZO: 1999–2002. Rhythmic Top 40 "The Real Z 103 dot 1"
- WGZO: 2002–2004. 1980s hits "Star 103.1 – The '80s Channel"
- WGZO 2004–2014. Classic hits "103.1 the Drive"
- WVSC 2014–present. Variety hits "SC 103"

== Previous logos ==
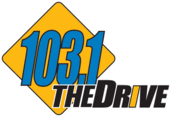

== See also ==
- List of radio stations in Georgia (U.S. state)
- Georgia (U.S. state)
- Lists of radio stations in North and Central America
