= KRVA-FM =

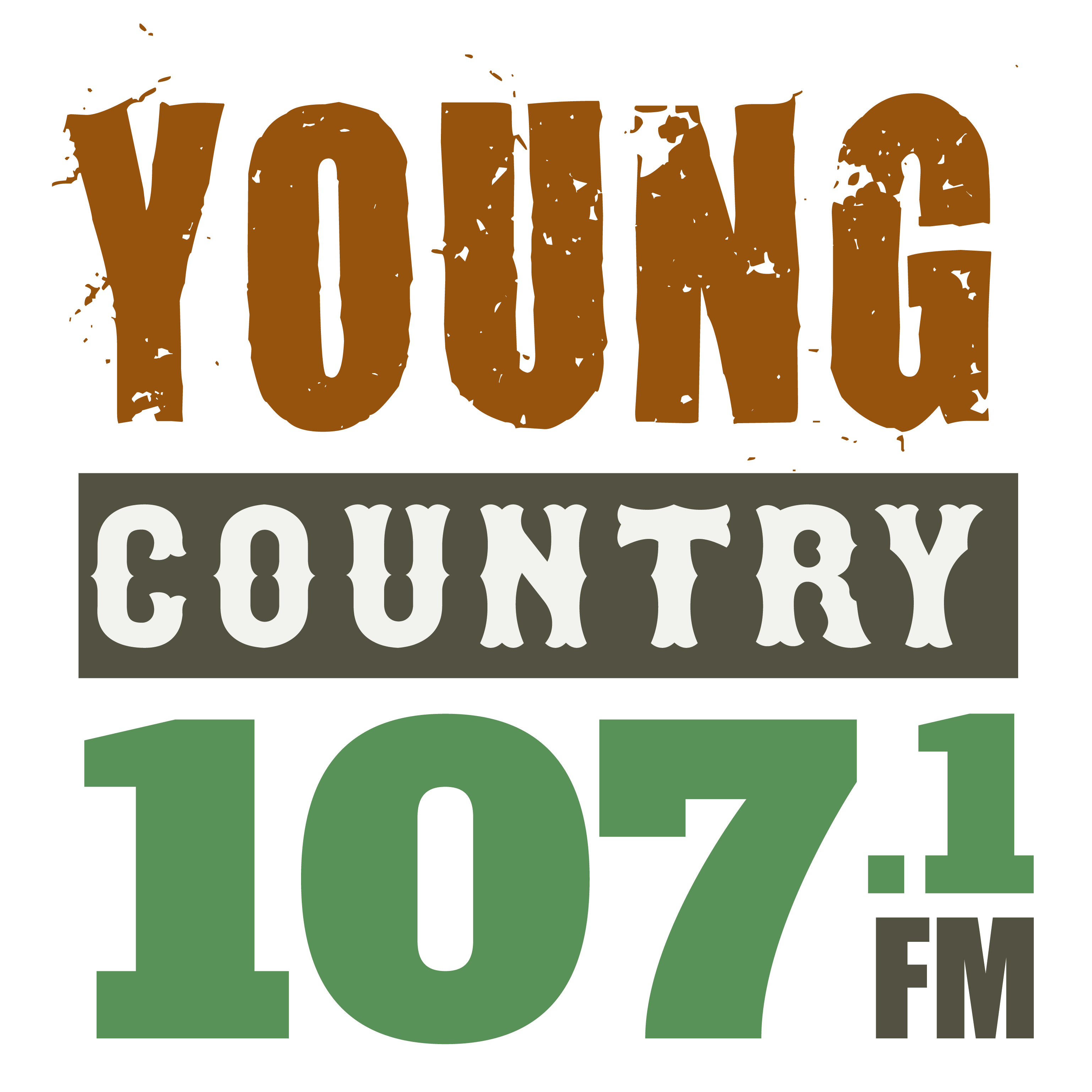
- Campbell, Texas; United States
- Broadcast area: Sulphur Springs, Texas; Greenville, Texas
- Frequency: 107.1 MHz
- Branding: Young Country 107.1

Programming
- Format: Country

Ownership
- Owner: Chad and Rhonda Young; (Racy Properties, LLC)
- Sister stations: KSST

History
- First air date: November 20, 1969 (as 95.3 KMMK McKinney, Texas)
- Former call signs: KMMK (1969–1985); KWPL (1985–1988); KSSA-FM (1988–1993); KZDF (1993–1997)

Technical information
- Licensing authority: FCC
- Facility ID: 54731
- Class: A
- ERP: 3,600 watts
- HAAT: 129 meters
- Transmitter coordinates: 33°7′30.00″N 95°44′32.00″W

Links
- Public license information: Public file; LMS
- Website: ksstradio.com

KRVA-FM (107.1 FM) is a radio station broadcasting a country music format. Licensed to Campbell, Texas, United States, the station serves the areas of Sulphur Springs, Texas and Greenville, Texas. The station is owned by Chad and Rhonda Young, through licensee Racy Properties, LLC.

== History ==
This station has operated under multiple sets of call letters on three different frequencies over its history. It started out on 95.3 and was licensed to McKinney, moved to 106.9 (still in McKinney), and finally ended up on 107.1 out of Campbell. On August 1, 1988, the station changed its call sign to KSSA-FM. Another callsign change occurred on New Year’s Day 1993 to KRVA-FM. It changed calls again in November 14, 1997 to KZDF, then reverted to KRVA-FM on August 6, 1999.

In March 2017, then-owner The Way Radio Group's president Craig Morgan, who was also host of the station's Moose in the Morning, was arrested for felony 3 theft and False statements to obtain property or credit, for using money earmarked for station expenses for other purposes. At this time, the morning show was immediately discontinued, and the company stated that it would be switching KRVA to a different format.

On April 10, 2017, KRVA-FM flipped to variety hits, branded as "107.1 Celebrate FM".

Effective May 25, 2017, KRVA-FM's license was transferred from The Way Radio Group LLC to Promise Radio Group LLC. Promise is a new company formed by some of the shareholders of The Way Radio Group.

On December 1, 2017 KRVA-FM changed their format from variety hits to country, branded as "Young Country 107.1".

Racy Properties, LLC, purchased the station from The Way Radio Group on June 27, 2018. Racy Properties, LLC is headed by Chad Young, and also owns AM radio station KSST in Sulphur Springs.
