= WOXD =

Coordinates: 34°18′10″N 89°31′25″W

- Oxford, Mississippi; United States
- Broadcast area: Oxford, Mississippi
- Frequency: 95.5 MHz
- Branding: Bullseye 95.5

Programming
- Format: Classic hits

Ownership
- Owner: Taylor Communications, Inc.

History
- First air date: 1988

Technical information
- Licensing authority: FCC
- Facility ID: 1299
- Class: A
- ERP: 6,000 watts
- HAAT: 100 meters (330 ft)

Links
- Public license information: Public file; LMS
- Webcast: Listen Live
- Website: bullseye955.com

WOXD (95.5 FM, "Bullseye 95.5") is a classic hits music radio station based in the Oxford area in the U.S. state of Mississippi.
