= KFWR =

Radio station in Jacksboro, Texas

Coordinates: 33.0720°N 98.0079°W

- Jacksboro, Texas; United States
- Broadcast area: Mineral Wells; Weatherford; Stephenville; Granbury; Fort Worth
- Frequency: 95.9 MHz
- Branding: 95.9 The Ranch

Programming
- Language: English
- Format: Texas Country

Ownership
- Owner: LKCM Radio Group
- Sister stations: KRVF, KTFW, KTWF

History
- First air date: 1970 as KMWT
- Former call signs: KMWT (1970–1981); KYXS (1981–2002)
- Call sign meaning: Fort Worth Radio

Technical information
- Licensing authority: FCC
- Facility ID: 31062
- Class: C0
- ERP: 100,000 watts
- HAAT: 425 meters (1,394 ft)

Links
- Public license information: Public file; LMS
- Webcast: Listen Live
- Website: www.959theranch.com

KFWR is a country music FM radio station in the Dallas/Fort Worth area in Texas, transmitting on 95.9 FM and playing a Texas Country format. This station is owned and operated by LKCM Radio Group. The station's studios are located in Sundance Square in Downtown Fort Worth, and its transmitter is located southeast of Jacksboro, Texas (the city of license).

== History ==
The station first started out as KMWT in 1970, with an unknown format. In 1981, the callsign was changed to KYXS as a country music station. In 2002, the station made its permanent switch to KFWR, bringing listeners a country radio station with a blend of Texas country, current country hits, and country classics. On May 1, 2008, the station dropped most of the current country hits in favor of "totally 100% TEXAS country music."

KFWR focuses on the area west of the Tarrant-Dallas county line calling it the Westoplex as opposed to the entire area's nickname of Metroplex.

95.9 The Ranch also brings its listeners a free concert series featuring artists in Texas for 25 weeks every summer in downtown Fort Worth.

The Ranch radio format can also be heard on KRVF, 106.9, Corsicana, Texas.

On February 21, 2013, KFWR upgraded its signal from 80 kW at 329 metres to 100 kW at 425 metres and moved the city of licence to Jacksboro. This upgrade has caused better signal penetration in Fort Worth and Denton.
