= KRVF =

Coordinates: 32.103°N 96.376°W

- Kerens, Texas; United States
- Broadcast area: Ennis, Malakoff, Corsicana, Gun Barrel City
- Frequency: 106.9 MHz
- Branding: 106.9 The Ranch

Programming
- Format: Texas country

Ownership
- Owner: LKCM Radio Group
- Sister stations: KFWR, KTFW-FM

History
- First air date: August 16, 1979 (as 107.1 KTLR Terrell, Texas
- Former call signs: KTLR (1979–1997); KZDL (1997–1999)
- Call sign meaning: Variant of KRVA-FM. KRVA-FM and KRVF (FM) were simulcasting sister stations at one time.

Technical information
- Licensing authority: FCC
- Facility ID: 41323
- Class: C3
- ERP: 21,500 watts
- HAAT: 111.3 m (365 ft)

Links
- Public license information: Public file; LMS
- Webcast: Listen Live
- Website: www.1069theranch.com

KRVF (106.9 MHz FM) is a country music radio station licensed to Kerens, Texas and is owned and operated by LKCM Radio Group.

KRVF is a sister station to 95.9 KFWR-FM "The Ranch" in Jacksboro, Texas and serves as an affiliate of the Dallas Cowboys radio network.

== History ==
On August 16, 1979, 107.1 signed on as KTLR, licensed to Terrell, Texas and was owned by Ken Jones d.b.a. Terrell Radio. It signed on as the FM counterpart to 1570 KTER. KTLR later moved to the Corsicana area, licensed to Kerens, as part of a series of moves that also included former sister station 107.1 KRVA-FM relocating from McKinney to Sulphur Springs.

On New Year's Day 1993, KTLR to 106.9 and changed to a Spanish music format from Spanish Radio pioneer Marcos Rodriguez Sr., son of Marcos A. Rodriguez. In 1997, the call letters were changed to KZDL under the same format. In 1999, the callsign was changed to KRVF and included a simulcast of WFAA-TV's evening news in Spanish. In 2003, the station was bought by LKCM from First Broadcasting. The format changed to Texas/Red Dirt music. It is currently co-owned with KFWR The Ranch in Ft. Worth, Texas and KTFW in Glen Rose, Texas. KRVF simulcast over 107.1 KRVA in Sulphur Springs, Texas until LKCM sold 107.1 to The Way Media Group. KRVA now airs a separate country format for Sulphur Springs.

As of October 2022, the Corsicana station's morning show is "Ranch Mornings With Guy and Jojo."
