= WNIR-LP =

- Newberry, South Carolina; United States
- Frequency: 95.5 MHz

Programming
- Format: College

Ownership
- Owner: Newberry College

History
- First air date: 2006

Technical information
- Licensing authority: FCC
- Facility ID: 132071
- Class: L1
- ERP: 58 watts
- HAAT: 39.4 meters (129 ft)
- Transmitter coordinates: 34°17′3.4″N 81°37′15.3″W

Links
- Public license information: LMS
- Website: www.newberry.edu/academics/areas-of-study/arts-communication

WNIR-LP (95.5 FM) is a radio station licensed to serve Newberry, South Carolina. The station is owned by Newberry College. It airs a college radio format.

The station was assigned the WNIR-LP call letters by the Federal Communications Commission on January 20, 2005.
