= KNLT (FM) =

- Palmer, Alaska; United States
- Frequency: 95.5 MHz
- Branding: 95.5 The Pass

Programming
- Format: Adult album alternative

Ownership
- Owner: Joshua G. Fryfogle

History
- Former call signs: KMVN (2012)

Technical information
- Licensing authority: FCC
- Facility ID: 189579
- Class: C1
- ERP: 64,000 watts
- HAAT: −221 metres (−725 ft)
- Transmitter coordinates: 61°41′39.0″N 149°16′1.9″W

Links
- Public license information: Public file; LMS
- Website: www.955knlt.com

KNLT (95.5 FM, "95.5 The Pass") is a radio station licensed to serve the community of Palmer, Alaska. The station is owned by Joshua G. Fryfogle and airs an adult album alternative format.

The station was assigned the call sign KMVN by the Federal Communications Commission on April 23, 2012. The station changed its call sign to KNLT on September 18, 2012.

== Programming ==
KNLT broadcasts an adult album alternative format under the branding "95.5 The Pass". The station describes its playlist as including classic recordings, deep cuts, new releases and lesser-known songs. The station has also stated that music by Alaska artists is included in its regular daily rotation rather than being limited to a weekly specialty program.

== Ownership and related media ==
KNLT is operated as part of Make A Scene Media, a multimedia organization based in Alaska's Matanuska-Susitna Borough. The organization also publishes The People's Paper and Make A Scene Magazine and provides media and production services.

Make A Scene developed from Fryfogle's involvement in the Mat-Su Valley music community. He began publishing Make A Scene as a local music newspaper in May 2007. A 2010 profile in the Mat-Su Valley Frontiersman described the publication as focusing on Valley musicians and reported that its circulation had increased from 3,000 to 10,000 copies during its first three years.
