= WIRO (FM) =

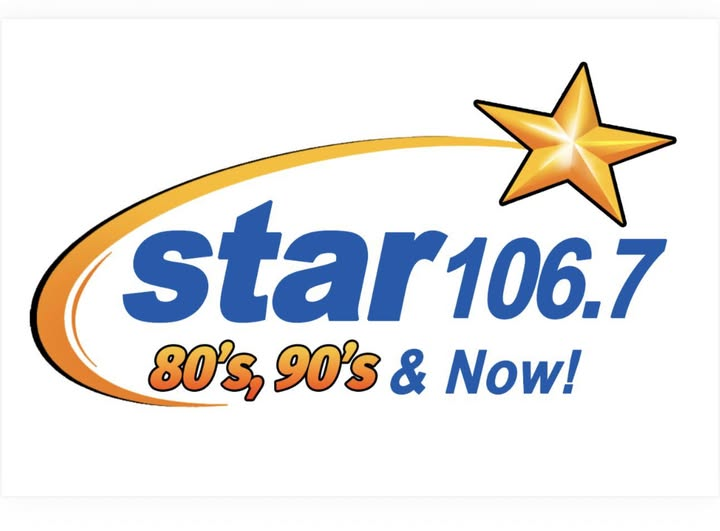
- Ironton, Ohio; United States
- Broadcast area: Huntington/Ashland/Ironton
- Frequency: 106.7 MHz
- Branding: Star 106.7

Programming
- Format: Adult contemporary

Ownership
- Owner: Total Media Group
- Sister stations: WLGC; WNRJ

History
- First air date: 1973
- Former call signs: WITO (1973–1985); WMLV (1985–1997); WFXN (1997–2002); WBKS (2002–2010); WLRX (2010–2019); WAWT (2019–2022)
- Former frequencies: 107.1 MHz (1973–2025)
- Call sign meaning: Ironton

Technical information
- Licensing authority: FCC
- Facility ID: 61686
- Class: A
- ERP: 3,600 watts
- HAAT: 131 meters (430 ft)
- Transmitter coordinates: 38°35′44″N 82°51′22″W

Links
- Public license information: Public file; LMS
- Webcast: Listen Live
- Website: WIRO Online

WIRO (106.7 FM) is a station covering the Huntington, West Virginia area. The station broadcasts at 106.7 MHz with an ERP of 3.1 kW, is licensed to Ironton, Ohio and carries an adult contemporary format, branded as "Star 106.7" and focusing on music from the 1980s and 1990s. The station is owned by Total Media Group, Inc. of Jackson, Ohio.

== History ==
WIRO, which originally signed on the air in 1973 on the 107.1 FM frequency as WITO, would later go through format and call sign changes as WMLV (1985–1997) and WFXN (1997–2002) before Clear Channel Communications transformed them into a local version of the KISS-FM brand under the WBKS call sign. But unlike the traditional mainstream top 40 format that was used at their sister stations, this version focused on rhythmic hits and did not use the trademarked blue ball. The reason for this was due to having a sister station in WKEE, which is the market's top 40 outlet.

On or before December 31, 2009, WBKS underwent a format change, becoming a simulcast of active rock station WAMX. On January 19, the station changed its call sign from WBKS to WLRX.

On October 30, 2012, the station underwent another format change, joining 24/7 Comedy.

On June 2, 2014, WLRX flipped to classic country as "107.1 The Bear".

On March 3, 2019, iHeartMedia announced it would sell four stations in its Aloha Station Trust, including WLRX, to the Educational Media Foundation in exchange for six translators already operated by iHeartMedia. The station was expected to flip to one of EMF's national networks (K-Love, Air1, or K-Love Classics) upon the sale's closure.

On May 31, 2019, the sale to Educational Media Foundation was closed and WLRX began operating under the Air1 branding. The station changed its call sign to WAWT.

The station changed its call sign to WIRO on November 9, 2022.

On December 5, 2024, Total Media Group of Jackson, Ohio announced they would be purchasing WIRO. In anticipation of the sale receiving FCC approval and closing, Total Media Group began operating WIRO under a time management agreement, dropping the Air1 branding and worship music format and began stunting a Christmas music format, branded as "Ho Ho Radio". The sale to Total Media Group was approved by the FCC and closed on December 10, 2024. In the meantime, the station dropped stunting Christmas music on January 1, 2025, replacing it with a continuous loop of 1999 by Prince, which was itself replaced shortly thereafter by a continuous loop of Achy Breaky Heart by Flatwoods, Kentucky native Billy Ray Cyrus. (Cyrus graduated from high school in Russell, Kentucky, which is directly across the Ohio River from Ironton.)

On January 6, 2025, WIRO launched a classic country format under the Hank FM branding, where it remained until May 10, 2025. Total Media Group began simulcasting WIRO on recently purchased WLGC in nearby Ashland, Kentucky on May 1, 2025. On May 7, 2025, Total Media Group filed an application with the FCC to temporarily take the station dark for technical upgrades and rebranding purposes. Upon approval, WIRO went off-the-air on the 107.1 frequency on May 10, 2025, with the Hank FM branding and classic country format permanently moving to WLGC.

Upon moving to 106.7 and returning to the air on July 1, 2025, WIRO was repackaged as a conservative talk station, branded as "The Eagle". This format remained until April 11, 2026, when WIRO temporarily resumed the "Achy Breaky Heat" stunt loop, this time with the addition of Gerardo's "Rico Suave" (Gerardo is now a resident of Ashland, Kentucky) as "Billy Ray Rico Radio". On April 12, 2026, WIRO officially relaunched as an adult contemporary format branded as Star 106.7.
