= WJOE (FM) =

- Vienna, West Virginia; United States
- Broadcast area: Parkersburg, West Virginia; Marietta, Ohio
- Frequency: 103.9 MHz
- Branding: Joe 103.9

Programming
- Format: Southern gospel
- Affiliations: USA Radio News

Ownership
- Owner: Roger Bouldin; (Bouldin Radio, LLC)

History
- Former call signs: WKGI (1976–1987); WATQ-FM (1987–1995); WETZ-FM (1995–2011); WNRJ (2011–2023)
- Call sign meaning: "Joe" (branding)

Technical information
- Licensing authority: FCC
- Facility ID: 18534
- Class: A
- ERP: 750 watts
- HAAT: 122.7 meters (403 ft)

Links
- Public license information: Public file; LMS
- Webcast: Listen Live
- Website: joe1039.com

WJOE (103.9 MHz) is a broadcast radio station carrying a southern gospel format. WJOE is licensed to Vienna, West Virginia, serving the Parkersburg, West Virginia and Marietta, Ohio area. WJOE's moniker is "Joe 103.9".

== History ==
The station was licensed as WKGI. On February 14, 1987, the call sign was changed to WATQ-FM. Its call sign was next changed on August 28, 1995, when it became WETZ-FM. WETZ-FM moved from New Martinsville, West Virginia to Vienna, West Virginia sometime in January 2010. The station can only be heard in New Martinsville via a distant signal, but now serves the Parkersburg/Marietta area.

The station was assigned the callsign WNRJ by the Federal Communications Commission on August 1, 2011.

On January 4, 2017, WNRJ changed formats to modern gospel music (playing current and progressive southern gospel), branded as "Praise FM 103.9". Praise FM 103.9 is a tier one charting station for the Singing News Top 80 monthly chart - one of eight stations in the United States.

On November 13, 2023, WNRJ changed its call sign to WJOE.
