= WXYY =

- Rincon, Georgia; United States
- Broadcast area: Savannah, Georgia; Hilton Head, South Carolina
- Frequency: 100.1 MHz
- Branding: G100.1

Programming
- Format: Rhythmic contemporary
- Affiliations: Compass Media Networks

Ownership
- Owner: Dick Broadcasting; (Dick Broadcasting Company, Inc. of Tennessee)
- Sister stations: WFXH-FM, WGCO, WHHW, WRWN, WUBB

History
- First air date: May 10, 2004 (as WMZD)
- Former call signs: WMZD (2004–06); WSGA (2006); WSSJ (2006–14)

Technical information
- Licensing authority: FCC
- Facility ID: 54805
- Class: C1
- ERP: 75,000 watts
- HAAT: 142 meters (466 ft)
- Transmitter coordinates: 32°16′49.00″N 81°11′40.00″W

Links
- Public license information: Public file; LMS
- Webcast: Listen live
- Website: g100savannah.com

WXYY (100.1 FM), known as G100.1, is a radio station broadcasting a rhythmic contemporary format. Licensed to Rincon, Georgia, US, the station serves the Savannah and Hilton Head areas. The station is owned by Dick Broadcasting, through licensee Dick Broadcasting Company, Inc. of Tennessee. The studios and offices are on the south side of Savannah and the transmitter is in Rincon.

== History ==
The station went on the air as WMZD on May 10, 2004. On March 9, 2006, the station changed its call sign to WSGA, on March 16, 2006, to WSSJ, and on March 6, 2014, to WXYY. The station switched from a New AC (NAC)/Smooth Jazz format to Gospel music on March 19, 2008, with the name "Joy 100.1."

In March 2014, after L & L Broadcasting bought the 50,000-watt station, WXYY moved its call sign and Hot AC format from 107.9 FM, which had a 24,000-watt signal. VP of Programming Scott Mahalick said the change "will bring a great jolt of energy and vibe" to the market. WXYY "Y100" continued to call its music "90's, 2K & Today". "The Bert Show" remained in the mornings with Patty Steele doing middays." On September 22, 2014, Program Director Rob Walker rebranded Y100 as "All The Hits", dropping all remaining 80s and most of the 90s music, along with The Bert Show and moved the station to a straightforward CHR position. Over the course of the next year, Y100 shifted to a rhythmic format, which resulted in Mediabase moving WXYY to the Rhythmic panel in November 2015.

Previous logo

On July 22, 2016, WXYY began stunting with a loop of "Nuthin' but a 'G' Thang" by Dr. Dre and Snoop Dogg, while running liners advising listeners to tune in at 5pm, at which time, WXYY flipped to classic hip hop as "G100".

In September 2017, Dick Broadcasting announced that it would acquire Alpha Media's clusters in Savannah, Kinston/New Bern/Jacksonville, and Myrtle Beach. Under the terms of the sale, however, a formal sale filing would not be made for the Savannah stations until August 2019, with Dick operating these stations under a local marketing agreement in the meantime. The sale, at a price of $5,000,000, was consummated on December 1, 2022,

On February 6, 2023, WXYY changed its format from classic hip hop to rhythmic contemporary, still branded as "G100.1".
