= KUJJ (FM) =

- McCall, Idaho; United States
- Frequency: 95.5 MHz
- Branding: Star 95.5

Programming
- Format: Adult contemporary

Ownership
- Owner: Inspirational Family Radio, Inc.

History
- First air date: 2014

Technical information
- Licensing authority: FCC
- Facility ID: 191489
- Class: C1
- ERP: 2,700 watts
- HAAT: 559 meters (1,834 ft)
- Transmitter coordinates: 44°45′54″N 116°11′54″W

Links
- Public license information: Public file; LMS
- Webcast: Listen Live
- Website: 955starfm.com

KUJJ (95.5 FM) is a radio station licensed to serve the community of McCall, Idaho. The station is owned by Inspirational Family Radio, Inc. It airs an adult contemporary music format.

The station was assigned the KUJJ call letters by the Federal Communications Commission on October 30, 2013.
