= WLGC-FM =

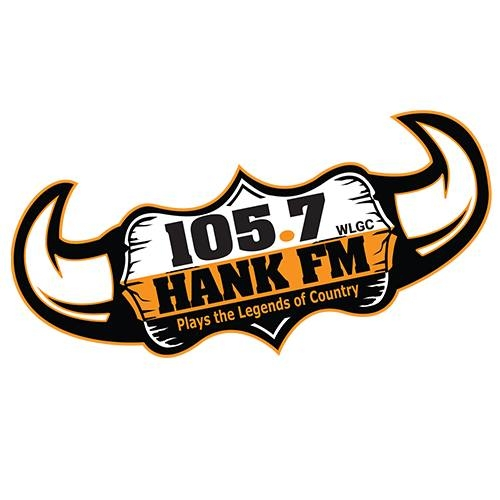
- Greenup, Kentucky; United States
- Broadcast area: Huntington/Ashland
- Frequency: 105.7 MHz
- Branding: Hank FM

Programming
- Format: Classic Country

Ownership
- Owner: Total Media Group
- Sister stations: WIRO; WNRJ

History
- First air date: September 1, 1982
- Call sign meaning: We Love Greenup County -FM

Technical information
- Licensing authority: FCC
- Facility ID: 25224
- Class: C3
- ERP: 12,500 watts
- HAAT: 142 meters (466 ft)
- Transmitter coordinates: 38°35′44″N 82°51′22″W

Links
- Public license information: Public file; LMS
- Webcast: Listen Live
- Website: WLGC-FM website

WLGC-FM (105.7 MHz) is a radio station broadcasting a classic country format under the Hank FM brand. Licensed to Greenup, Kentucky, United States, the station's studios are located in Ashland, Kentucky, with its transmitter remaining in Greenup. The station broadcasts to the Huntington-Ashland, WV-KY-OH, Metropolitan Statistical Area. The station is currently owned by Total Media Group, Inc. of Jackson, Ohio.

== History ==
On September 1, 1982, WLGC radio debuted at 105.5 FM, playing "The City of New Orleans" by Arlo Guthrie. The song kicked off not only a new radio station, but also a new format: A Little Bit Country, A Little Bit Rock. This hybrid programming was the brainchild of WLGC Vice-President/General Manager Robert Scheibly, who had commissioned a research project to determine viable formats for the fledgling station. Scheibly left the program director's position at WKEE/WHTN to take on the challenge of creating a new radio station focusing on local community needs.

In addition to the unique music mix, WLGC's early years offered a wide variety of programming tailored specifically to Greenup County, including high school sports and a daily "good news" public service newscast.

In 1985, an AM station was added to the Greenup County Broadcasting family. The new station, transmitting at 1520 AM, initially simulcast the FM's programming, but soon developed into WTCV - The Christian Voice - a full-time gospel station. A few years later, the station became the Tri-State's first sports talk station. At the station's request, the AM station's over the air license was canceled by the Federal Communications Commission on February 1, 2017, and is currently broadcasting as an online only feed from WLGC's website and smartphone app.

The second stage in WLGC's evolution came in March 1992, when the station increased power from 3,000 to 12,500 watts and moved to 105.7 FM. This growth opened a new and competitive market for the company. The format was changed to country music, concurrent with the power increase, and the station became a Tri-state presence.

In 2002, the WLGC studios were moved from Greenup to Ashland, increasing the station's visibility to advertisers and listeners.

On January 13, 2014, at Midnight EST, the station dropped its country music format in favor of an oldies format and was rebranded as "Kool Hits 105.7", playing top 40 hits of the 1960s, '70s and '80s.

On February 10, 2016, long-time morning show host, Mark Justice, suffered a heart attack and died unexpectedly. Mark had been with the station since 1984 and had served as morning host since 1985, on The Breakfast Club. Following Mark's death, general manager Jim Forrest said the long running "Breakfast Club Christmas Spectacular" would be renamed the "Mark Justice Memorial Christmas Spectacular", in his honor.

On December 3, 2024, Total Media Group of Jackson, Ohio, filed with the FCC their intent to purchase the station from Greenup County Broadcasting, Inc. The purchase was approved by the FCC on May 5, 2025. On May 1, 2025, at 12:00PM, just prior to the approval of the sale, Total Media Group discontinued the oldies format and "Kool Hits" branding, moving the Hank FM branding and classic country programming from sister Total Media Group station WIRO in nearby Ironton, Ohio. At that time, Total Media Group brought over long time Tri-State broadcaster J.B. Miller from WIRO as the morning host, hired Miss Kitty to host middays and hired Ernie G. Anderson as afternoon host. Anderson is also a long-time local radio broadcaster and was the afternoon drive-time host for WLGC prior to the sale to Total Media Group and the format switch to classic country.
