= WGCO =

Coordinates: 31.613°N 81.360°W

Midway, Georgia; United States
- Broadcast area: Savannah, Georgia; Brunswick, Georgia (limited); Jacksonville, Florida (limited)
- Frequency: 98.3 MHz
- Branding: Hot 98-3

Programming
- Format: Contemporary hits
- Affiliations: United Stations Radio Networks

Ownership
- Owner: Dick Broadcasting; (Dick Broadcasting Company, Inc. of Tennessee)
- Sister stations: WFXH-FM, WHHW, WRWN, WUBB, WXYY

History
- First air date: 1974
- Former call signs: WSOJ (1974–1985); WAJS (1985); WZKS (1985–1989)
- Call sign meaning: Georgia Coast

Technical information
- Licensing authority: FCC
- Facility ID: 11674
- Class: C1
- ERP: 100,000 watts
- HAAT: 299 meters (981 ft)

Links
- Public license information: Public file; LMS
- Webcast: Listen live
- Website: hot983savannah.com

WGCO (98.3 FM, "Hot 98-3") is a commercial radio station licensed to Midway, Georgia, and serving the Savannah metropolitan area and Brunswick, Georgia. Owned by Dick Broadcasting, it broadcasts a contemporary hit format. Its studios are on Mall Boulevard in Savannah.

WGCO's transmitter is sited off Steve Nelson Road in the Chimney Villa section of Townsend, Georgia, about halfway between Savannah and Brunswick.

== History ==
The station signed on the air in 1974 as WSOJ, licensed to Jesup, Georgia. The station broadcast a Southern Gospel format with Christian talk and teaching programs. It was powered at only 3,000 watts, a fraction of its current output. It could only be heard in Jesup and adjacent communities.

In 1982, the station flipped to an all-news format. It used an audio simulcast of the new cable network, CNN Headline News. It did not have many listeners and shortly thereafter, the station went off the air.

Southern Gospel music returned to the station when it went back on the air in 1984. Then the station flipped to country music. It used the call letters WAJS, calling itself "The Great 98" a year later. Within a few months, the station became adult contemporary WZKS "Kiss FM". In 1989, it got a power boost and the station's tower was moved to McIntosh County, Georgia. That put it closer to the more lucrative radio market of Savannah. It began broadcasting oldies as "Oldies 98.3". It later became "98.3 Cool FM" with the current call sign WGCO.

In 2005, the station flipped to adult hits. It used the nationally syndicated "Jack FM" format and brand. On March 16, 2007, the station dropped Jack FM and returned to the oldies format once again. It used its former name, "Oldies 98.3" after a 'protest' was held by then-former morning host Chuck "Boom Boom" Cannon asking for the return of Oldies 98.3. On September 24, 2007, WGCO refined its sound to classic hits as Big 98.3, playing a variety of songs from roughly 1964–1985, with the core being the 1970s.

On August 29, 2013, the station dropped the classic hits format and began stunting with a loop of Hank Williams Jr.'s "All My Rowdy Friends Are Coming Over Tonight". This led to a flip to classic country as "98.3 Hank FM" the next day.

WGCO's owner, Alpha Media, decided to divest some of its radio properties. In September 2017, Dick Broadcasting announced that it would acquire Alpha Media's clusters in Savannah, Kinston/New Bern/Jacksonville, and Myrtle Beach. Under the terms, a formal sale filing would not be made for the Savannah stations until August 2019, with Dick operating these stations under a local marketing agreement (LMA) in the meantime.

On May 25, 2018, the station began stunting with a heartbeat sound, and teasing that "something hot" was coming. On May 28, 2018, the station flipped to contemporary hit radio as Hot 98.3. The station competes primarily with iHeartMedia's WAEV 97.3 KISS-FM. That gave WAEV it its first direct competitor since the flip of sister station WXYY to classic hip-hop.

== See also ==
- List of radio stations in Georgia (U.S. state)
- Lists of radio stations in North and Central America
