= WHHW =

Currently silent
- Hilton Head Island, South Carolina; United States
- Broadcast area: Hilton Head Island, South Carolina; Savannah, Georgia
- Frequency: 1130 kHz
- Branding: Candela 96.1FM Y 1130AM

Programming
- Format: Regional Mexican

Ownership
- Owner: Dick Broadcasting; (Dick Broadcasting Company, Inc. of Tennessee)
- Sister stations: WFXH-FM, WGCO, WRWN, WUBB, WXYY

History
- First air date: August 25, 1986 (as WHHR)
- Former call signs: WHHR (1986–1987); WHHQ (1987–1988); WHHR (1988–1995); WFXH (1995–2011)

Technical information
- Licensing authority: FCC
- Facility ID: 48366
- Class: AM: B FM: D
- Power: AM: 1,000 watts day 500 watts night
- ERP: FM: 99 watts
- HAAT: FM: 0 meters
- Transmitter coordinates: 32°12′1.00″N 80°43′27.00″W
- Translator: 96.1 W241CV (Hilton Head Island)

Links
- Public license information: Public file; LMS
- Webcast: Listen live
- Website: lapantera961.com

WHHW (1130 AM) is a radio station licensed to Hilton Head Island, South Carolina. The station is currently owned by Dick Broadcasting, through licensee Dick Broadcasting Company, Inc. of Tennessee.

WHHW broadcasts with 1,000 watts by day. Because AM 1130 is a clear channel frequency, it must reduce power to 500 watts at night to avoid interference. WHHW simulcasts its programming on an FM translator, W241CV at 96.1 MHz, broadcasting at a power level of 99 watts.

== History ==
On February 14, 1983, the station went on the air as WHHR with the call sign referring to Hilton Head Radio. It was a sister station to 106.1 WFXH-FM. WHHR changed its call sign on June 11, 1987, to WHHQ. On December 23, 1994, it changed its call sign back to WHHR, only to change the call sign again on New Year's Day 1995 to WFXH. On February 28, 2011, the call sign was changed to WHHW.

Prior to March 6, 2011, the station was an ESPN Radio Network affiliate, WFXH. It previously featured programming from CNN Radio.

Monty Jett, formerly morning host on co-owned WLOW, moved to WHHW with its change to "1130 the Island", a soft AC/adult standards format.

In 2015, WHHW changed to Adult Album Alternative with the slogan "True. Music. Variety."

In September 2017, Dick Broadcasting announced the purchase of Alpha Media stations in three markets, including Savannah.

In 2018, WHHW switched to oldies as "The Island".

On October 4, 2021, WHHW changed its format from oldies to Regional Mexican, branded as "La Pantera 96.1".

On April 1, 2026, WHHW ceased operations and went silent.
