= WNRJ (AM) =

Radio station in Huntington, West Virginia

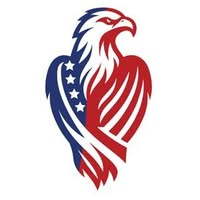
- Huntington, West Virginia; United States
- Broadcast area: Tri-State Region
- Frequency: 1200 kHz
- Branding: "1200 The Eagle"

Programming
- Format: Conservative Talk

Ownership
- Owner: Total Media Group
- Sister stations: WLGC; WIRO

History
- First air date: November 29, 1946
- Former call signs: WPLH (1946–1961); WWHY (1961–1978); WKSD (1978–1981); WWHY (1981–1987); WHRD (1987–2004); WEMM (2004–2008); WRWB (2008–2010); WNBL (2010–2011); WEMM (2011–2015); WZPS (2015–2017); WYSN (2017–2023); WJOE (2023)
- Former frequencies: 1450 kHz (1946–1956); 1470 kHz (1956–2011)

Technical information
- Licensing authority: FCC
- Facility ID: 61277
- Class: D
- Power: 5,000 watts (day); 9 watts (night)
- Transmitter coordinates: 38°24′17″N 82°29′21″W
- Translator: 95.3 W237ER (Huntington)

Links
- Public license information: Public file; LMS
- Webcast: Listen Live

WNRJ (1200 AM) is a commercial radio station licensed to Huntington, West Virginia, United States. The station is owned by Total Media Group of Jackson, Ohio. The station airs a conservative talk radio and is branded as 1200 The Eagle.

== History ==
=== Early days ===
This station, as WPLH, signed on for the first time on November 29, 1946, with a "grand opening" program broadcast live from the Hotel Prichard in Huntington. WPLH transmitted on 1450 kHz with a 250-watt non-directional signal. The Huntington Broadcasting Corporation, owned and operated by Flem J. Evans, advertised broadcasting, recording and transcription services as being available at the WPLH studios. The station offered a mix of live and recorded local programming, live hillbilly music from the Echo Valley Boys and other groups, plus national programming from the Mutual Network. The callsign was said to stand for "Work, Play, and Live in Huntington."

=== Move to 1470 ===
In 1952, control of Huntington Broadcasting Corp. passed to E.A. Marshall until he was succeeded by Charles Krause in 1956. In 1955, the station changed broadcast frequencies from 1450 kHz to 1470 kHz. Struggling financially, the station was sold to The Tierney Company in 1958. The new owners downsized the staff and moved the studio facilities to a smaller location.

WPLH was sold again in 1960, this time to the Ohio River Broadcasting Corporation. The station's callsign was changed to WWHY, advertised as the "Fun Channel" and "Home of the Flyin' HY Guys." The new image was for the new format of pop hits and rock and roll. In the late-1960s and early-1970s, WWHY was a power in the Tri-State area. The next two decades would see the station's format change several times and in 1978, the callsign changed to WKSD (for "Kan't Stop Dancing" or "Kool Sound of Disco").

=== 1980s ===
In March 1981, the license for this station was involuntarily transferred to Leo J. Meisel, interim trustee, after the station's owner fell into serious financial difficulties. The transfer was approved by the FCC on March 27, 1981, and the transaction was completed on April 22, 1981. This station was reassigned its former call letters WWHY by the Federal Communications Commission on July 9, 1981.

In September 1985, the Federal Deposit Insurance Corporation filed to force Meisel to transfer the license to the FDIC. In March 1987, Meisel reached an agreement to instead donate the license for this station to the Marshall University Foundation, Inc. The deal was approved by the FCC on June 17, 1987, and the transaction was consummated on July 2, 1987. This transfer, arranged as part of a settlement agreement with the FDIC, caused the FDIC to drop its claim and the FCC to dismiss the transfer request. On July 10, 1987, the new owners had the station's call sign changed to WHRD to match the Marshall University sports nickname, the "Thundering Herd."

=== 1990s ===
In July 1991, the Marshall University Foundation, Inc., reached an agreement to sell this station to Southern Communications Corporation. The deal was approved by the FCC on August 27, 1991, and the transaction was consummated on October 23, 1991.

In February 1995, Southern Communications Corporation signed a deal to sell this station to Simmons Broadcasting Company. The deal was approved by the FCC on April 11, 1995, and the transaction was consummated on May 20, 1995. In April 1997, control of station licensee Simmons Broadcasting Company was passed from David L. Simmons to W. Lee Simmons. This transfer was approved by the FCC on June 27, 1997.

=== 2000s ===
In November 2000, Simmons Broadcasting Company (Lee Simmons, president) completed a deal to sell this station to Concord Media Group, Inc. (Mark W. Jorgenson, president/owner) for a reported $200,000. The deal was approved by the FCC on January 17, 2001, and the transaction was consummated on February 16, 2001. At the time of the sale, the station aired a sports radio format.

In May 2003, Concord Media Group, Inc., agreed to sell this station to Mortenson Broadcasting through their Mortenson Broadcasting Company of West Virginia, LLC, holding company. The deal was approved by the FCC on November 12, 2003, and the transaction was consummated on January 30, 2004. The weekend of January 30, the station played TV show theme songs in a "Stunting effort" to attract listeners. On Monday, February 2, the station debuted their short lived "Christian Talk format". On February 9, 2004, the new owners had the FCC change this station's call sign to WEMM to match its new FM sister station (which itself was changed from WEMM to WEMM-FM at the same time). From late February 2004 to September 2008, it served as a simulcast partner to sister station WEMM-FM (107.9 FM).

=== Move to 1200 ===
WNBL branding (2011)

Based on applications filed in January 2004 and November 2005, the FCC granted this station a construction permit on October 25, 2007, to change broadcast frequencies from 1470 kHz to 1200 kHz, increase daytime signal power to 22,000 watts, change critical hours signal power to 8,000 watts, and decrease nighttime signal power to just nine watts. The low nighttime power is required to protect the signal of clear channel AM WOAI in San Antonio, Texas, which also broadcasts at 1200 kHz.

The station was assigned the WRWB call sign by the FCC on September 1, 2008.

=== 2010s ===
The call sign was changed again to WNBL on November 1, 2010, to match the station's "Better Life Radio" branding. As WNBL, the station played music on weekdays with educational and inspirational programs on Saturday plus religious programs on Sunday. After construction and testing were completed in January 2011, the station received a new broadcast license for the new 1200 kHz frequency on February 8, 2011.

The call sign was reverted to WEMM and the station was rebranded as "Shine 1200" on December 20, 2011. The new format is gospel music.

On July 2, 2015, WEMM changed its call sign to WZPS and rebranded as "Spirit 1200". On January 3, 2017, WZPS changed its call sign to WYSN. On May 19, 2023, the station changed its call sign to WJOE. On November 13, 2023, the station changed its call sign to WNRJ.

=== 2020s ===
Om February 5, 2026, Total Media Group of Jackson, Ohio, owners of WIRO in Ironton, Ohio and WLGC in Greenup, Kentucky, announced that they had entered into an agreement with Bristol Broadcasting Group to purchase WNRJ, translator W237ER (95.3 FM) and the WNRJ transmitter site for $230,000. The agreement was approved by the FCC and consummated on April 9, 2026. Upon finalization of the purchase, Total Media Group moved their conservative talk format, branded as "The Eagle", from WIRO to WNRJ.
