= KTWF =

Simulcast with KOME-FM Tolar
- Scotland, Texas; United States
- Broadcast area: Wichita Falls, Texas
- Frequency: 95.5 MHz
- Branding: 95.5 K-Hits

Programming
- Format: Classic hits
- Affiliations: Compass Media Networks; Premiere Networks

Ownership
- Owner: Gerry Schlegel; (LKCM Radio Group, L.P.)
- Sister stations: KTFW-FM, KFWR, KRVF

History
- First air date: August 16, 1996
- Former call signs: KJKB (1996–2013); KXPN-FM (2013–2020)

Technical information
- Licensing authority: FCC
- Facility ID: 855
- Class: C3
- ERP: 19,000 watts
- HAAT: 115 meters (377 ft)
- Transmitter coordinates: 33°41′3.60″N 98°36′45.80″W

Links
- Public license information: Public file; LMS
- Webcast: Listen live
- Website: www.khits955.com

KTWF (95.5 FM, "K-Hits") is a radio station licensed to Scotland, Texas serving the Wichita Falls, Texas area with a classic hits format. The station is owned and operated by LKCM Radio Group. KTWF's studios are located on Call Field Rd in the southwest portion of Wichita Falls. The transmitter site is about seven miles north of Archer City, Texas.

== History ==
KTWF signed on the air August 16, 1996 as KJKB. Originally branded Boss 95.5, the station aired a classic rock format. On March 4, 2013, the station changed its call sign to KXPN-FM and switched formats from classic rock to sports as 95.5 ESPN with programming from ESPN Radio.

On April 5, 2020, KXPN-FM changed its format from sports to classic country, branded as “95.5 Hank FM”. A call sign change to KTWF followed on June 2, 2020.

On November 14, 2022, KTWF changed its format from classic country to a simulcast of classic hits-formatted KOME-FM 95.5 FM Tolar, branded as "K-Hits 95.5".

== Former sports programming ==
KXPN-FM previously aired syndicated programming from ESPN Radio. The Lone Star Outdoor Show hosted by Cable Smith aired Saturday mornings from 8-9 a.m., followed by a local show hosted by longtime Wichita Falls sports personality Andy Austin from 9-10 a.m. Austin also provided local updates weekdays at 7:25 a.m. and 9:25 a.m.

In July 2013, Midwestern State University announced KXPN-FM would be the new flagship station for Midwestern State Mustangs athletics. The station aired live broadcasts of MSU football and men's and women's basketball, as well as pregame and postgame shows. The station also aired weekly coaches' shows for the teams.

Starting with the 2015 season, KXPN-FM was the flagship station for Wichita Falls High School football, agreeing on a multi-year deal with the school.

KXPN-FM had been a radio affiliate of the Texas Rangers since 2013.

== Former personalities ==
Former local on-air personalities included Debbie Watts, and Jackie B, of The Boss Morning Show, as well as former host and program director Jerrod Knight.
