= KNHK-FM =

- Weston, Oregon; United States
- Broadcast area: Walla Walla, Washington
- Frequency: 101.9 MHz (HD Radio)
- Branding: 101.9 Hank FM

Programming
- Format: Classic country
- Subchannels: HD2: AAA "106.9 The Oasis"; HD3: Regional Mexican "Ke Buena 94.5"; HD4: Adult hits "104.5 Bob FM"

Ownership
- Owner: Alexandra Communications
- Sister stations: KUJ

History
- First air date: 1997 (as KZZM)
- Former call signs: KZZM (1996–2005); KMMG (2005–2006); KUJJ (2006–2012); KZIU-FM (2012–2021)
- Call sign meaning: Hank FM

Technical information
- Licensing authority: FCC
- Facility ID: 78697
- Class: C2
- ERP: 13,500 watts
- HAAT: 292 meters (958 ft)
- Transmitter coordinates: 45°47′41″N 118°10′6″W
- Translators: HD3: 94.5 K233CJ (College Place); HD4: 104.3 K282CI (Walla Walla)

Links
- Public license information: Public file; LMS
- Website: crankthehank.com kebuena945.com (HD3)

KNHK-FM (101.9 FM, "101.9 Hank FM") is a radio station broadcasting a classic country music format. Licensed to Weston, Oregon, United States, the station is currently owned by Alexandra Communications.

== History ==
The station signed on the air in 1997 as KZZM. On February 3, 2005, the station changed its call sign to KMMG. On March 1, 2006, it changed to KUJJ.

On December 20, 2011, KUJJ changed its format from smooth jazz to contemporary hits, branded as "New Zoo 102". On January 1, 2012, KUJJ changed its call sign to KZIU-FM.

On October 18, 2015, KZIU flipped to classic country as "101.9 Hank FM".

On October 12, 2021, KZIU-FM changed its call sign to KNHK-FM.

== HD Radio ==
On October 1, 2024, KNHK-HD3 changed their format from sports to Regional Mexican, branded as "Ke Buena 94.5".

== Translators ==
KNHK-FM also broadcasts on the following translators:

Broadcast translator for KNHK-HD3
Call sign	Frequency	City of license	FID	ERP (W)	Class	FCC info
K233CJ	94.5 FM	College Place, Washington	156936	250	D	LMS

Broadcast translator for KNHK-HD4
Call sign	Frequency	City of license	FID	ERP (W)	Class	FCC info
K282CI	104.3 FM	Walla Walla, Washington	156912	250	D	LMS

K233CJ 94.5 FM College Place relays KNHK-HD3. K282CI 104.3 FM Walla Walla relays KNHK-HD4.

== HD Radio ==
KNHK-FM airs the following formats on its HD sub channels: adult alternative "106.9 The Oasis" on HD2, Fox Sports Radio on HD3 and adult hits ("104.5 Bob FM") on HD4.
