= King of the hill (game) =

Children's game

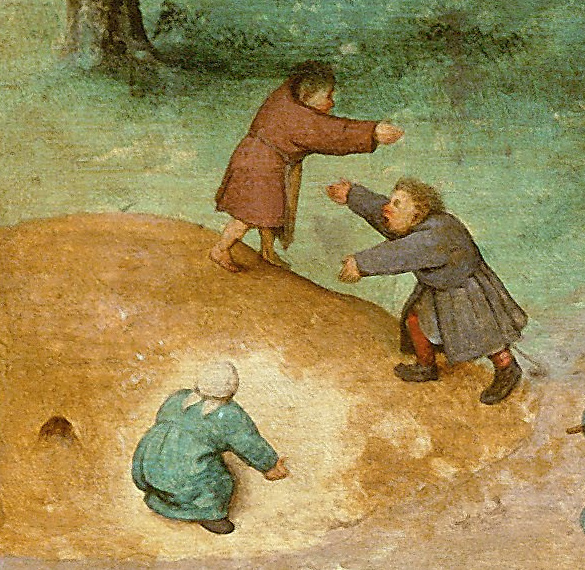
Detail from Pieter Brueghel the Elder's Children's Games

King of the hill (also referred to as king of the mountain or king of the castle) is a children's game, with the goal of having a single player remain on top of a large hill or similar feature as its "king". Competitors try to take the player's place and remove them, declaring them the new king of the hill.

The way the king can be removed from the hill depends primarily on the rules determined by the players before the game begins. Typically, pushing is the most common way of removing the king from the hill, and punching and kicking are not allowed. The potential for rougher versions of the game have led to it frequently being banned from schools.

"King of the hill" is a method of play in airsoft and the woodsball variant of paintball, as well as an archetype of various first-person shooter videogames.

== Rules ==
There are many versions of the game. These include:

=== Classic version ===
1. The first to get on the hill at the start becomes the king.
2. To become a king, you need to go up the hill and push the king off.
3. At the end, the king wins.

=== Team version ===
In this version, there are two or more opponent teams

1. The king is the leader of the first team to get up the hill at the start.
2. To become the new king, the leader of an opposing team must get on the hill and push the king off.
3. Allies of the king can push opponents and enemies off, and non-lead opponents can push off allies but not the king.
4. At the end, the king and his allies win.

=== "Royal family" version ===
In this version, there is not just the king but also his family, making up teams of four.

1. The king, queen, prince, and princess are the members of the team that get on the hill first.
2. The other team's players can push off their respective counterpart on the hill and assume the royal role.
3. The king or queen has the ability to "kick" an opposing team's player from the hill and send them back to their own team in exchange for the person with the same role from the king's or queen's team.

== Use as a metaphor ==
The name of the game has become a common metaphor for any sort of competitive zero-sum game or social activity in which a single winner is chosen from among multiple competitors, and a hierarchy is devised by the heights the competitors achieve on the hill (what Howard Bloom called "the pecking order" in his book The Lucifer Principle), and where winning can only be achieved at the cost of displacing the previous winner.

== In sports ==
In racket sports, such as tennis or pickleball, a variation of this concept manifests in the recreational game alternately titled King of the Court or Queen of the court. In this game, one player is designated as the "king"/"queen" and occupies one side of the court. Other players, the challengers, line up single file on the other side. One challenger steps up and plays out a singles point (or multiple points) against the king. The point can be started with either a serve or a drop hit. If the challenger wins, they replace the king on the other side of the court and become the new king.

== In video gaming ==
The concept of king of the hill in video gaming was introduced by Core War players, who would pit their warriors against each other in a fight for survival. King of the hill tournaments have existed for Core War since the 1980s.

In video game versions of king of the hill, a player or team must keep control of a specific area (not necessarily a literal hill) for a predetermined amount of time. When that amount of time has elapsed, the round either ends or a new area is designated on the map. Players are primarily removed from the area by being killed.

King of the hill has been featured as a game variant in many video games, especially first-person shooters like Halo: Combat Evolved and the more traditional Perfect Dark (and, more recently, Gears of War 2). One of the games that popularized such modes is Team Fortress 2. The Splatoon series has a variant of king of the hill called Splat Zones. Overwatch had a mode called "Control", which used king of the hill mechanics. King of the hill is also an option in top-down games such as those in the Army Men series.

== See also ==
- Tom Tiddler's Ground
- List of traditional children's games
