= List of most-listened-to radio programs =

In the United States, radio listenership is gauged by Nielsen and others for both commercial radio and public radio. Nielsen and similar services provide estimates by regional market and by standard daypart, but do not compile nationwide information by host. Because there are significant gaps in Nielsen's coverage in rural areas, and because there are only a few markets where the company's proprietary data can be compared against competing ratings tabulators, there is a great deal of estimation and interpolation when attempting to compile a list of the most-listened-to radio programmes in the United States. In 2009, Arbitron, the American radio industry's largest audience-measurement company at the time (since subsumed into its television counterpart Nielsen), said that "the job of determining number of listeners for (any particular programme or host) is too complicated, expensive and difficult for them to bother with." In contrast, because most UK radio broadcasts are distributed consistently and nationwide, the complications of measuring audiences that are present in American radio are not present for British radio.

Talkers Magazine, an American trade publication focusing on talk radio, formerly compiled a list of the most-listened-to commercial long-form talk shows in the United States, based primarily on Nielsen data.

In addition to Talkers' independent analyses, radio companies of all formats include estimates of the audience in news releases. The nature of news releases allows radio companies to inflate their listener totals by obscuring the difference between listeners at any given time, cumulative listenership over a time frame, and potential audience.

== Worldwide broadcasts ==
- The Voice of America reached 326 million weekly listeners on all platforms and languages as of 2022.
- BBC World Service has an estimated 188 million weekly listeners, broadcasting in 32 languages as of 2009.
- A State of Trance with Armin van Buuren has an estimated 40 million listeners across 84 countries.
- American Top 40 with Ryan Seacrest has an estimated 20 million listeners worldwide.
- Intelligence for Your Life with John Tesh has an estimated 40 million weekly listeners across the United States, Canada and the United Kingdom.

== Popular radio shows in the United States ==
The total listenership for terrestrial radio in the United States as of January 2025 was 256 million, up from 230 million in 2024. Of the 121 million listeners in markets served by portable people meters in 2021, an average of 7.5 million are listening to a radio at any given time, up slightly from 2020. 68 percent of homes have at least one radio, with the average home having 1.5 radios as of 2020, both figures being steep declines from 2008. An estimated 12% of listenership to FCC-licensed AM and FM radio stations comes from means other than the actual AM or FM signal itself, usually an Internet radio stream.

Sirius XM Radio has a base of 34.3 million subscribers as of 2020. American Top 40 attracts over 20 million listeners per week. The late Rush Limbaugh's show was the number-one commercial talk show from 1991 until Limbaugh's death in February 2021. NPR's Morning Edition and All Things Considered are the two most popular news programmes.The late Tom Kent self-estimated his listenership in 2014 at over 23 million weekly listeners over all of his network's programmes, which span the classic hits, adult hits and hot adult contemporary formats. NPR has an overall listenership of 57 million listeners weekly across all shows and platforms as of 2020, with a growing proportion of that figure coming from off-air platforms.

Until the development of portable people meters, Arbitron (Nielsen's predecessor in the radio measurement business) did not have the capability to measure individual airings of a programme the way Nielsen Ratings can for television, and as such, it only measures in three-month moving averages each month. Portable people meters are currently only available in the largest markets Arbitron serves. Thus, it is impossible under current survey techniques to determine the listenership of an individual event such as the Super Bowl; even in cases (such as in PPM markets) where such measurement is feasible, the radio industry's business model relies on selling advertising parceled by daypart rather than individual show or event. In 2022 and 2023, Nielsen released a "far from complete" report suggesting that National Football League games are among the most-listened-to events on radio. Major League Baseball radio broadcasts, particularly the playoffs, also rank among the most dominant broadcasts in their dayparts and home markets (usually in the evenings), with much of that coming from in-home listening.

For most of its existence, Talkers Magazine compiled Arbitron's data, along with other sources, to estimate the minimum weekly audiences of various commercial long-form talk radio shows; its list was updated monthly until the magazine unceremoniously dropped the feature in 2016, then resumed publication in 2017. The 2017 reintroduction also incorporates off-air distribution methods (particularly those that are Internet-based) but not satellite radio, as Talkers could not access data for that medium; as a result, the estimates for most shows increased dramatically when compared to the 2015 methodology. NPR and APM compile Arbitron's data for its public radio shows and releases analysis through press releases.

Included is a list of the 20 most-listened-to radio shows in the United States according to weekly cumulative listenership, followed by a selection of shows of various formats that are most-listened-to within their category. (Unless otherwise noted, the Talkers "non-scientific" estimate is the source.)

Programme	Format	Network	Broadcast Time	Weekly listeners (in millions)
The Ramsey Show	Financial talk	iHeartMedia	Midday	18
Marketplace	Financial news	APM	p.m. drive	14.8
All Things Considered	News broadcast	NPR	p.m. drive	14.7
The Sean Hannity Show	Conservative talk	Premiere	p.m. drive	14.5
Morning Edition	News broadcast	NPR	a.m. drive	13.1
The Mark Levin Show	Conservative talk	Westwood One	West Coast p.m. drive	12
Coast to Coast AM	Paranormal talk	Premiere	Overnights	11
The Glenn Beck Program	Conservative talk	Premiere	East Coast a.m. drive	10
The Dan Bongino Show	Conservative talk	Westwood One	Midday	8.75
The Mike Gallagher Show	Conservative talk	Salem	East Coast a.m. drive	8.5
Delilah	Adult contemporary music	Premiere	Evenings	8.3
The Dana Show	Conservative talk	Radio America	Midday	8
BBC World Service	News broadcast	APM	Continuous (24/7)	7.8
The Hugh Hewitt Show	Conservative talk	Salem	East Coast a.m. drive	7.5
The Thom Hartmann Program	Progressive talk	Pacifica / WYD Media	Midday	7
The Brian Kilmeade Show	Conservative talk	Fox News Talk	Early midday	6
Fresh Air	News broadcast	NPR	Midday	6
Michael Berry	Conservative talk	iHeartMedia		5
The Joe Pags Show	Conservative talk	Compass	East Coast p.m. drive	5
Wait Wait... Don't Tell Me!	Panel game show	NPR	Weekends	4

Note on broadcast time: because of the effects of time on North American broadcasting, nationally syndicated shows that air live will end up on different dayparts in different time zones. The above list makes note of this. Note that although shows such as Beck's and Levin's are listed under "West Coast" drive times, that their shows are based on the East Coast (and thus air in early midday and early evening time slots there).

The pay service Sirius XM Radio was monitored directly by Arbitron from 2007 to early 2008. The final numbers available, from early 2008 (prior to when XM and Sirius merged), had The Howard Stern Show being the most listened-to show on either platform, with Stern's Howard 100 channel netting a "cume" of 1.2 million listeners and Howard 101 (the secondary and replay channel) netting an additional 500,000 listeners. Among formats common to both platforms (all of which have since merged into singular channels), the contemporary hit radio channels, with a combined 1.6 million listeners, ranked highest, with classic rock, hot country music, 1970s and 1980s music channels each netting approximately 1 million listeners combined. Sirius had 8.3 million total subscribers in early 2008 (the Arbitron ratings were measured against a 7-million subscriber base compared to 10 million for XM) and now has more than 30 million. Eastlan Ratings, a service that competes with Arbitron in several markets, includes satellite radio channels in its local ratings; Howard 100 has registered above several lower-end local stations in the markets Eastlan serves, the only satellite station to do so.

Virtually all of the most-listened-to radio programs in the United States are in English. Other than English, Spanish had established national networks. Other languages (Chinese, Polish, Korean, various languages of India, and French) are broadcast only on a local level.

=== Past top programs in the United States ===
Beginning with the 1930–31 radio season, three ratings services measured radio listener totals. The Cooperative Analysis of Broadcasting did so from 1934 to 1935. From 1935 to 1936 and 1948–49, the bulk of radio's "golden age," C.E. Hooper monitored the numbers, which were popularly called "Hooperatings." The A.C. Nielsen company, which continues to measure television ratings today, took over American radio's ratings beginning with the 1949–50 radio season and ending in 1955–56. During this era, nearly all of radio's most popular programs were broadcast on one of three networks: NBC Red, NBC Blue, or CBS' Columbia network.

The top-rated radio programs on American radio from each season:

- 1930–31, 1931–32: Amos 'n' Andy (Pepsodent, NBC-WJZ)
- 1932–33, 1933–34: The Chase and Sanborn Hour (Eddie Cantor, NBC-WEAF)
- 1934–35: Fleischmann's Yeast Hour (Rudy Vallee, NBC-WEAF)
- 1935–36: Major Bowes Amateur Hour (Chase and Sanborn, NBC-WEAF)
- 1936–37: Texaco Town (Eddie Cantor, CBS)
- 1937–38, 1938–39, 1939–40: The Chase and Sanborn Hour (Edgar Bergen, NBC Red)
- 1940–41: The Jell-O Program (Jack Benny, NBC Red)
- 1941–42: The Chase and Sanborn Hour (Edgar Bergen, NBC Red)
- 1942–43: The Pepsodent Show (Bob Hope, NBC)
- 1943–44: Fibber McGee and Molly (Johnson Wax, NBC)
- 1944–45: The Pepsodent Show (Bob Hope, NBC)
- 1945–46, 1946–47: Fibber McGee and Molly (Johnson Wax, NBC)
- 1947–48: The Fred Allen Show (Ford Motor Company, NBC)
- 1948–49: Fibber McGee and Molly (Johnson Wax, NBC)
- 1949–50: The Lucky Strike Program (Jack Benny, CBS)
- 1950–51: Lux Radio Theatre (dramas with a rotating cast, NBC)
- 1951–52, 1952–53: Amos 'n' Andy (Rexall Drug Stores, CBS)
- 1953–54: People Are Funny (Mars Candy, NBC)
- 1954–55: The Lucky Strike Program (Jack Benny, CBS)
- 1955–56: Our Miss Brooks (Colgate-Palmolive-Peet, NBC)

At his peak in the late 1930s, commentator Charles Coughlin was praised for his listener base. His show was not a network broadcast but was instead syndicated on 36 stations. Some modern estimates peg his listenership at approximately 30 million listeners. President Franklin D. Roosevelt's irregularly scheduled fireside chats, simulcast on all of the major networks, consistently reached over 50 percent of the listening audience during his last five years in office.

In the 1980s, the Larry King Show was the most-listened-to program in the United States, before The Rush Limbaugh Show. During the early 1990s, Chuck Harder was Limbaugh's most prominent rival among talk shows discussing sociopolitical issues.

Though radio listenership totals collapsed in the 1950s with the advent of television, some radio programs attracted large audiences decades later. Before moving to satellite radio in 2006, The Howard Stern Show peaked at 20 million listeners on syndicated terrestrial radio. Unlike the above programs, Stern's radio show was broadcast daily for 4–5 hours per day. Paul Harvey, at his peak, drew an estimated 25 million listeners to his 15-minute daily program. At his peak in the 1990s, The Rush Limbaugh Show was drawing as many as 20 million listeners a week; as of 1998, Stern, Limbaugh and then-first-place Dr. Laura Schlessinger were drawing between 17 and 18 million listeners, according to Talkers estimates.

At the time of both shows' departure from Talk Radio Network in fall 2012, The Savage Nation was estimated to have an audience of 9 million listeners and The Laura Ingraham Show was estimated at 6 million listeners. Prior to his retirement, Neal Boortz registered approximately 5.75 million listeners. The public radio series Car Talk with Click and Clack had approximately 4 million listeners immediately prior to ending its original run, ranking it among the most-listened-to weekend radio programs in the United States; individual affiliates noted that the hour of highest listenership on their stations were during Car Talk, hence why it was kept in reruns for five years afterward. Talk of the Nation registered 3.2 million listeners prior to its cancellation in 2013. Immediately prior to Blair Garner's departure from the show in July 2013, After Midnite was quoted as drawing 2.7 million listeners, the most of any country music show for which listenership estimates are made available.

== Top stations in the United Kingdom ==
Total listenership in the United Kingdom in June 2025 was 49.995 million. All BBC programming had 31.100 million listeners, and all commercial programming had 39.503 million listeners. The figures counted listeners over the age of 15 who tuned in for at least five minutes.

The 15 most listened to stations in Britain, as of June 2025 (only individual stations)
Station	Format	Listeners in millions
BBC Radio 2	Adult contemporary/AOR	12.619
BBC Radio 4	Spoken word (news, drama, factual, comedy)	9.226
BBC Radio 1	Current-based music (pop, rock, dance, urban, alternative)	7.483
Greatest Hits Radio	Classic hits and specialist music	6.657
BBC Radio 5 Live	Rolling news, discussion and sport	5.514
Classic FM	Classical music	4.428
Hits Radio	CHR/Hot AC	4.369
Talksport	Sports radio	3.379
LBC	News, discussion, debate	2.645
BBC Radio 6 Music	Multi-formatted (electronica, punk, funk, hip hop, trip hop, indie)	2.587
Magic	Adult contemporary	2.253
Absolute Radio	Indie music	2.155
Kisstory	Classic dance music	1.972
BBC Radio 3	Classical, jazz, world music, drama, culture, arts	1.947
Heart London	Hot Adult Contemporary	1.939

Of breakfast programmes, the top three most listened to are BBC breakfast programmes.

The 5 most listened to breakfast programmes in Britain, as of Q4 2023
Breakfast Programme	Q4 2022	Q4 2023	Year-on-year change
BBC Radio 2 Breakfast Show	7,136,000	6,562,000	−8%
BBC Radio 4 Today	6,170,000	5,615,000	−9%
BBC Radio 5 Live Breakfast	1,608,000	1,453,000	−10%
LBC	1,353,000	1,341,000	−1%
Talksport	1,144,000	1,243,000	9%

== See also ==
- Audience measurement
- List of best-selling albums in the United States of the Nielsen SoundScan era
- List of most-watched television broadcasts
