= Ross Mitchell =

American radio announcer and voice artist

Ross Mitchell Brown Jr (born January 12, 1955) is an American radio news anchor and voice-over artist. Mitchell is known most widely as the former announcer on the nationally syndicated Coast to Coast AM radio show with Art Bell and George Noory and The Savage Nation with Michael Savage. Mitchell is currently the radio announcer for Red Eye Radio and Eye on Washington on KKOH.

Mitchell began working in radio at age 13. He graduated from the University of the Pacific with a Bachelor of Arts degree in Communications. Mitchell was a disc jockey, news director and reporter in California. In 1983, he moved to Reno, Nevada and joined what was then KOH.

He currently hosts Reno's Morning News weekdays from 5 a.m. to 9 a.m. His previous co-hosts were Monica Jaye (2002–2018), Dan Mason (2018–2021) and Ryan Nutter (2021–2023). Mitchell was also the voice of XM Talk on XM channel 168 from 2009 to 2013.

ZZ Top has also spotlighted Mitchell, featuring a clip of his introduction of the band on the album XXX.

On April 10, 2012, George Noory on Coast to Coast AM announced that Ross Mitchell's employer no longer wanted Mitchell to do the announcements for the show because the station no longer was an affiliate. According to the show's Facebook page, two other announcers — Charles Tomas and Dick Ervasti — were hired as replacements and announced that day. This ended up being just a change in location, not absence, however, as Mitchell was immediately hired by Cumulus Media Networks' Red Eye Radio as that show’s voiceover announcer.

On September 16, 2013, Mitchell reunited with Coast to Coast founder and original host Art Bell as announcer for Bell's new Sirius XM Radio show, Art Bell's Dark Matter. Bell died in 2018.

Phil Hendrie has parodied Art Bell for many years on his own radio talk show. These segments included Hendrie's parody of Mitchell's deep voice, and featured comedic variations on the call-in phone numbers and catchphrases Mitchell used for Bell's program.
