= The Political Zoo =

2006 book by Michael Savage

- Author: Michael Savage
- Language: English
- Subject: Conservative ideology
- Publisher: Nelson Current
- Publication date: April 2006
- Publication place: United States
- Media type: Hardcover
- ISBN: 1595550429
- OCLC: 64510771
- Dewey Decimal: 818/.602 22
- LC Class: PN6231.C25 S28 2006
- Preceded by: Liberalism Is a Mental Disorder

The Political Zoo is a book written by the American conservative talk radio host Michael Savage. The book is unlike Savage's previous works (The Savage Nation (2003), The Enemy Within (2004), Liberalism is a Mental Disorder (2005) in that it is a parody of 51 public figures, of both liberal and conservative political figures and celebrities (and at least one Socialist). The book contains political cartoons of politicians, celebrities and media personalities, all of whom are parodied with a story and a satirical binomial nomenclature, in that the various personalities are given a pseudo-genus and pseudo-species, in such a way as to slight the personality being mentioned, in most cases.

The book peaked at number four on the New York Times best sellers list in its first week.

The 51 personalities who appear in the book are:

- Kofi Annan
- Alec Baldwin
- Harry Belafonte
- Bono
- Barbara Boxer
- George W. Bush
- Robert Byrd
- Jimmy Carter
- James Carville
- Hugo Chávez
- Dick Cheney
- Jacques Chirac
- Bill Clinton
- Hillary Clinton
- George Clooney
- Katie Couric
- Howard Dean
- Maureen Dowd
- Dianne Feinstein
- Newt Gingrich
- Ruth Bader Ginsburg
- Rudy Giuliani
- Al Gore
- Jesse Jackson
- Kim Jong-Il
- John Kerry
- Larry King
- Rush Limbaugh
- Madonna
- Gwyneth Paltrow
- Bill Maher
- John McCain
- Bill O'Reilly
- Nancy Pelosi
- Sean Penn
- Harry Reid
- Rob Reiner
- Condoleezza Rice
- Bill Richardson
- Pat Robertson
- Chuck Schumer
- Arnold Schwarzenegger
- Al Sharpton
- Cindy Sheehan
- George Soros
- Arlen Specter
- Howard Stern
- Barbra Streisand
- Arthur Sulzberger Jr.
- Donald Trump
- Ted Turner
