= The Laura Ingraham Show =

US radio program

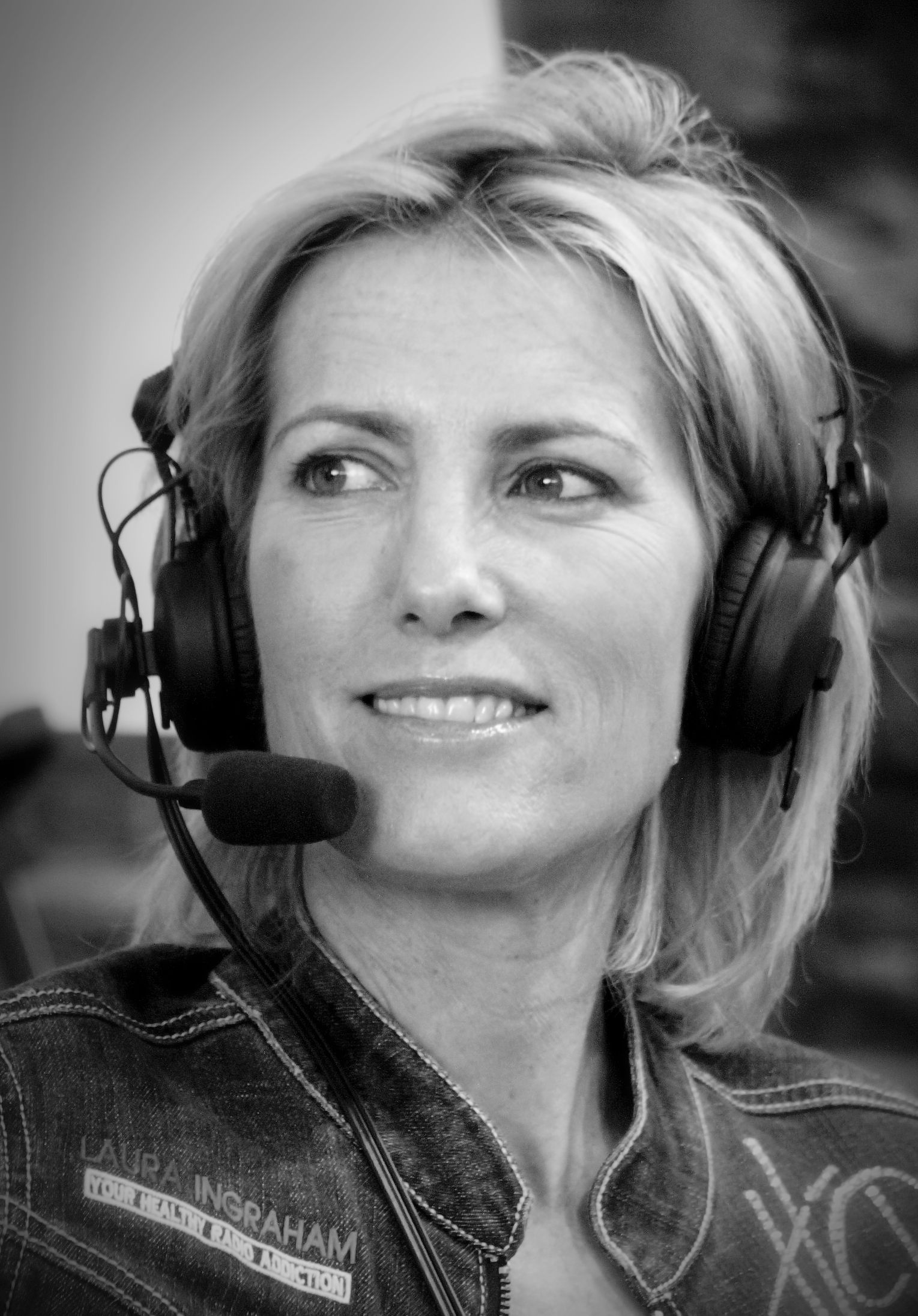
- Ingraham in 2011
- Running time: 3 hours
- Country of origin: United States
- Language: English
- Home station: WTNT (AM)
- Syndicates: Westwood One (2001–04); Talk Radio Network (2004–12); Courtside Entertainment (2013–18)
- Hosted by: Laura Ingraham
- Recording studio: Washington, D.C.
- Original release: April 2001 – December 2018
- Website: www.lauraingraham.com
- Podcast: www.lauraingraham.com/podcast

The Laura Ingraham Show was a three-hour American radio show hosted by conservative Laura Ingraham. It was among the most popular radio shows broadcast in the United States. In 2016, the show ranked number 20 on the Talkers Magazine 2016 Heavy Hundred list of the most important talk show hosts in America; Ingraham was the highest-ranking female host listed.

The show primarily focused on politics, pop culture, and media bias; topics of interest included race relations, trends in education, the Middle East, and the legacy of feminism. The show aired from 2001 to 2018.

== Background ==
Ingraham's show, one of several to launch in 2001 as the conservative talk radio genre expanded in popularity, originally aired on the now defunct Westwood One Network.

Ingraham joined the Talk Radio Network in 2004. In June 2008, Ingraham temporarily left the air due to a contract dispute. A number of hosts filled in for her, primarily Tammy Bruce and Monica Crowley. Ingraham returned at the end of the month. Ingraham left TRN in November 2012 after her contract expired.

The show returned on January 3, 2013, after Ingraham took ownership of the property, with plans to include more discussions about pop culture.

On November 14, 2018, Ingraham announced that the program would not return from its annual December hiatus, as she intended to spend more time with her family and focus on her television show The Ingraham Angle. She continued to produce material for Courtside's PodcastOne.

== Major issues featured ==
=== Illegal immigration ===
Ingraham frequently advocated "securing the borders" by putting more resources into stopping illegal immigration. Ingraham had a segment called "The Illegal Immigration Sob Story" alert in which she highlighted media articles that, in her view, sought to garner sympathy for illegal immigrants.

=== Radical Islam ===
The show frequently raised the topic of radical Islam. Ingraham discussed current events and media reports about the war on terror and what she believes to be a growing faction of Islam: Jihadists.

=== Bioethics ===
Ingraham often discussed bioethical issues, opposing legal elective abortion care, human cloning and embryonic stem-cell research. She was an outspoken opponent of Missouri Constitutional Amendment 2 (2006), a ballot measure legalized human cloning; Ingraham argued that the initiative was deceptive. Every January 22, Ingraham promoted the anti-abortion March for Life.

=== American Values ===
Ingraham discussed sex and pornography on her show. She criticized people such as Howard Stern, Hugh Hefner, and others who she claimed have pervaded American culture with what she describes as "filth" at the expense of "traditional American values".
