= Art Bell's Dark Matter =

American radio talk show

- Genre: Talk show
- Running time: ~4 hours, Monday–Thursday; 10 pm ET to 2 am ET
- Country of origin: United States
- Home station: Indie Talk Channel 104; Sirius XM Radio
- Starring: Art Bell
- Announcer: Ross Mitchell
- Produced by: Paul Bowman (producer); Evan Winkofsky (associate producer)
- Executive producer(s): Art Bell
- Recording studio: Pahrump, Nevada, United States
- Original release: September 16 – November 4, 2013
- Opening theme: "Ride My See-Saw" by The Moody Blues
- Ending theme: "Midnight in the Desert" by Crystal Gayle
- Website: artbell.com

Art Bell's Dark Matter was an American radio talk show hosted by broadcaster and author Art Bell. Dark Matter primarily focused on paranormal and scientific topics. The program was exclusive to Sirius XM Radio, a subscription-based satellite radio service. Dark Matter debuted on September 16, 2013, and aired live Monday through Thursday from 10 p.m. ET to 2 a.m. ET on Sirius XM Radio's Indie Talk Channel 104. Dark Matter was the first program hosted by Art Bell full-time since his departure from regularly hosting Coast to Coast AM in 2003. On November 4, 2013, Bell announced that he was abruptly ceasing the production and airing of Dark Matter following a dispute with Sirius XM Radio regarding Sirius XM customers experiencing technical difficulties streaming his show live via the Internet.

== Background and development ==
Art Bell was the creator and former host of the late night radio talk show Coast to Coast AM; he ceased being its regularly scheduled host in 2003, and subsequently continued to host occasional shows of Coast to Coast AM, although due to events in his family and conflicts with Premiere Networks and the show's management team, he undertook a series of hiatuses from the show. Bell's final appearance on Coast to Coast AM was in 2010 when he hosted the program's annual Halloween show, "Ghost to Ghost." Despite his departure, Premiere Networks continues to rebroadcast archival shows of Coast to Coast AM hosted by Bell entitled Somewhere in Time with Art Bell, albeit against Bell's wishes.

In early 2013, after nearly a decade since Bell's departure from hosting Coast to Coast AM full-time, Bell was contacted through social media by a Sirius XM Radio representative about developing a new satellite radio talk show, which was later entitled Art Bell's Dark Matter. Following the show's formal announcement on July 30, 2013, Sirius XM Radio president and chief content officer Scott Greenstein remarked that Bell's Dark Matter program would be "uncensored, unrestricted, uncluttered and utterly unique."

Dark Matter premiered on September 16, 2013, with theoretical physicist Michio Kaku as the show's first guest. Kaku had been a frequent guest of Bell's on his previous radio programs, including Coast to Coast AM.

On November 4, 2013, Bell announced that he was abruptly ceasing the production and airing of Dark Matter following a dispute with Sirius XM Radio regarding Sirius XM customers experiencing technical difficulties streaming his show live via the Internet. According to Bell, Sirius XM Radio subscribers experienced problems streaming Dark Matter live, thus negatively impacting the program's caller-driven format. Bell also stated that the Dark Matter program was being pirated and streamed live via third party websites. To remedy these issues, Bell sought to have Dark Matter stream live from his artbell.com website for free, a suggestion which Sirius XM Radio refused. Following a breakdown in negotiations between Bell and Sirius XM Radio, Bell stated on his Facebook page: "Sometimes when you are 'all in' you win, sometimes lose. By mutual agreement, Dark Matter will no longer air as of tonight."

== Format and subject matter ==
Dark Matter aired live Monday through Thursday from 10 p.m. ET to 2 am. ET on Sirius XM Radio's Indie Talk Channel 104. It was rerun immediately following its live broadcasts, and was rerun during its regularly schedule hours on Friday through Sunday. Bell requested that Sirius XM Radio not replay the program's show during the daytime and restrict its re-airings to nighttime when "the mood is right." As was customary during his tenure on Coast to Coast AM, Bell opened the program's phone lines for listeners to call in to Dark Matter.

According to Sirius XM Radio, Dark Matter primarily focused on topics including: "the paranormal, near-death experiences, quantum physics, extraterrestrial life and the unusual."

Bell hosted Dark Matter from a new studio built by Sirius XM Radio in a guest house at his rural residence in Pahrump, Nevada. Bell enlisted former Coast to Coast AM announcer Ross Mitchell to create the program's introduction and bumper announcements. The radio producer for Dark Matter was Paul Bowman. The program's associate producer Evan Winkofsky operated the boards from Washington, D.C. Dark Matter's closing theme song was "Midnight in the Desert," which was written and performed by Crystal Gayle for Art Bell.

== Guests ==
Following its premiere on September 16, 2013, Bell interviewed several notable guests on Dark Matter:

- Loyd Auerbach, parapsychologist
- Steven M. Greer, osteopath and ufologist
- Paul Gunter, energy policy analyst and activist
- Michael S. Heiser, Biblical scholar
- Richard C. Hoagland, author
- Linda Moulton Howe, investigative journalist
- Michio Kaku, theoretical physicist
- Roger Leir, physician and ufologist
- John McAfee, software developer and McAfee, Inc. founder
- Seth Shostak, astronomer
- Whitley Strieber, novelist and radio personality

== Planned return to production ==
In the spring of 2015 Art Bell announced that his program would return to production on July 20, 2015, reborn as Midnight in the Desert. It would not be broadcast by Sirius XM Radio; instead it would be streamed live from midnight to 3:00 a.m. Eastern Time Zone, Monday through Friday, via a link on his website or via the TuneIn app on a smartphone or tablet. The program would also be broadcast live by AM, FM, and shortwave terrestrial radio stations agreeing to his terms for relaying the Internet stream. On December 11, 2015, Bell announced that he had permanently stepped down as host of Midnight in the Desert due to concerns about his family's safety (Bell had reported multiple instances of someone shooting firearms at and near his property in the fall of 2015, according to an interview with the Gabcast). The show was then taken over by Bell's producer Heather Wade (Bell made occasional guest host appearances until 2016) for about two and a half years until she was replaced by former Coast to Coast guest host Dave Schraeder in May 2018. Wade went on to start the competing Kingdom of Nye late-night show from the Pahrump studio Bell had used. On October 8, 2022, Dark Matter Digital Network and Dark Matter News announced plans to relaunch the network together.

== See also ==
- Paranormal radio shows
- Coast to Coast AM
