= KBUL =

KBUL may refer to:

- KBUL (AM), a radio station (970 AM) licensed to Billings, Montana, United States
- KBUL-FM, a radio station (98.1 FM) licensed to Carson City, Nevada, United States
