= Liberalism Is a Mental Disorder =

2005 book by Michael Savage

Liberalism Is a Mental Disorder: Savage Solutions
- Author: Michael Savage
- Language: English
- Subject: Conservative ideology
- Publisher: Nelson Current
- Publication date: 12 April 2005
- Publication place: United States
- Media type: Hardcover, Paperback, Audio CD (abridged), Audio cassette (abridged), Audio Download
- Pages: 221 pp
- ISBN: 1-59555-006-2
- OCLC: 57613542
- Dewey Decimal: 320.51/3/0973 22
- LC Class: JK421 .S29 2005
- Preceded by: The Enemy Within
- Followed by: The Political Zoo

Liberalism Is a Mental Disorder: Savage Solutions is a political book written in first person by conservative radio personality Michael Savage.

In the book, character Michael Savage named after the author states his opinion that American liberals are making political moves that undermine what he believes to be the basic tenets of American life, including marriage, the U.S. Constitution, the Bill of Rights, and the Ten Commandments. One chapter is dedicated to his criticisms of radical Islam, which he calls "Islamofascism". In each chapter is a "Savage Spotlight of Truth", that describes how he believes liberals spread their political agenda.

Liberalism is a Mental Disorder stayed on the Top 10 New York Times Best Seller list for three weeks, after its release on April 12, 2005.

== Overview (categorized by chapter) ==
1. Savage first discusses George W. Bush's actions in the War in Iraq. He argues that the U.S. could free Iraq and move out. Savage uses a comparison to George S. Patton for his plan. He concludes that with the war over, the US would have more time to focus on domestic problems.
2. In the second chapter Savage states his belief that Islamist radicals have turned the growth of Islam into a dangerous campaign, arguing that Islam has links to most terrorist attacks that have occurred the past 20 years. Savage goes on to reference religious passages from the Qur'an which he interprets to promote killing non-believers. Savage calls radical Islamists Islamofascists, and points out his belief that they have become a large threat in recent years.
3. Savage then addresses illegal immigration. According to his estimates, over 12 million people entered the United States illegally each year for the past several years before 2005. Even in the heightened state of alert after 9/11, Savage writes, all these people enter through the borders, most times without detection. He claims that illegal immigrants also indirectly take money from American citizens through welfare and Medicaid as well as tax evasion and an increased load on the criminal justice system.
4. Savage then discusses lawyers, explaining why he believes that many of the numerous lawsuits filed in the U.S. are unnecessary. One of his examples is Seong Sil Kim v. NYCTA, in which Seong Sil Kim was awarded $9.9 million because she stood in front of a train to commit suicide and injured her hand in doing so. Savage alleges that approximately 80% of doctors order unneeded tests and 74% refer patients to other specialists to avoid getting sued, and that many times the tests are paid for with tax money.
5. Savage then discusses mass media, criticizing its characterizations of Yassar Arafat following the PLO founder's death. Savage claims that the PLO has killed millions of opposers, and that Arafat was indirectly responsible for millions of deaths; Savage criticizes Arafat's posthumous media profile as "innovative" and "freedom fighter'". Savage also criticizes Arafat for reportedly hiding away billions of dollars that came from different countries that was to help the Palestinian people.
6. Savage criticizes groups such as the ACLU (American Civil Liberties Union) and PETA (People for the Ethical Treatment of Animals).
7. The book ends with a list of reasons why Savage believes John Kerry lost the 2004 election. Savage's emphasis was on gay marriage, arguing that too many voters oppose it. According to the book's references, of the 11 states that introduced a Defense of Marriage initiative on the 2004 ballot, all 11 supported the bill.
