= KKOH =

Coordinates: 39°40′40.68″N 119°48′9.69″W

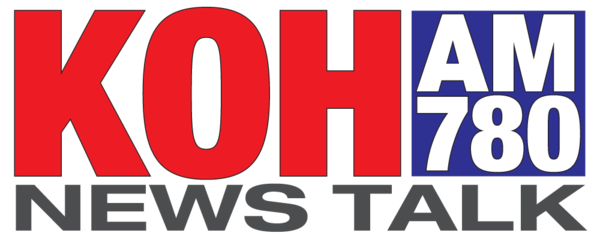
- Reno, Nevada; United States
- Broadcast area: Central and Northern Nevada
- Frequency: 780 kHz
- Branding: News Talk 780 KOH

Programming
- Format: News/talk
- Network: Westwood One
- Affiliations: ABC News Radio; Premiere Networks; Salem Radio Network; KOLO-TV weather coverage

Ownership
- Owner: Cumulus Media; (Radio License Holding CBC, LLC)
- Sister stations: KBUL-FM; KNEV; KWYL

History
- First air date: October 13, 1971
- Former call signs: KCRL (1971–1981); KROW (1981–1994)
- Call sign meaning: Derived from KOH, Nevada's oldest station, now 630 KPLY

Technical information
- Licensing authority: FCC
- Facility ID: 11236
- Class: B
- Power: 50,000 watts
- Repeater: 98.1 KBUL-FM HD2 (Carson City)

Links
- Public license information: Public file; LMS
- Webcast: Listen live; Listen live; Listen live (via iHeartRadio)
- Website: www.kkoh.com

KKOH (780 AM; "News Talk 780 KOH") is a commercial radio station licensed to Reno, Nevada. It airs a news/talk radio format and is owned and operated by Cumulus Media. Studios and offices are on East Plumb Lane. The transmitter is off Chickadee Drive.

KKOH broadcasts at 50,000 watts, the maximum power permitted by the Federal Communications Commission (FCC) for AM stations. A single tower is used during the day, allowing KKOH to be heard around Central and Northern Nevada and some distance into California, providing a strong grade B signal to Sacramento. Because 780 AM is a clear channel frequency, reserved for Class A station WBBM in Chicago, KKOH must broadcast a directional signal at night to avoid interference. It uses a three-tower array after sunset. Even with this restriction, it can be heard in much of the Western United States with a good radio.

== Programming ==
KKOH airs a mix of local and nationally syndicated talk shows. Weekdays begin with America in the Morning followed by Reno's Morning News with Ross Mitchell. In the afternoon, The Jon Sanchez Show followed by The Ryan Nutter Show, both of them are non-political shows. The rest of the schedule is made up of nationally syndicated conservative talk programs: The Sean Hannity Show, The Mark Levin Show and Red Eye Radio.

Weekends feature shows on money, health, home repair, technology and gardening, some of which are paid brokered programming. Syndicated weekend programs include The Kim Komando Show, Nevada Newsmakers with Sam Shad, The Chris Plante Show, America at Night with Rich Valdes, Sunday Night with Bill Cunningham as well as repeats of weekday shows. Weather coverage is supplied by KOLO-TV, Reno's ABC television affiliate. Most hours begin with an update from ABC News Radio.

KKOH currently does not have a local political talk show at this time after program director and talk show host Dan Mason retired on January 31, 2023. Previous local political talk show hosts were Rusty Humphries (1998–2003) and Bill Manders (2003–2011).

== History ==
The station began broadcasting on October 13, 1971. The original call sign was KCRL, owned by businessman E. L. Cord. It was a sister station to Reno's NBC television affiliate, KCRL-TV (now KRNV-DT). The 'CRL' in the station's call letters stood for "Circle L"—a ranch that Cord owned in the Nevada desert. KCRL became well known across the West for its classical music format. Although the station lost $25,000 a month, Cord took the losses philosophically, feeling that he was providing a public service. Its call sign was changed to KROW in 1981 and it gradually evolved into a country station.

The station's current incarnation dates from 1994. Soon after Citadel Broadcasting bought KOH, Nevada's oldest radio station (on the air since 1928), it applied to move from its longtime home at 630 AM to KROW's frequency at 780. The 630 facility must reduce its power from 5,000 watts to 1,000 watts at sunset to protect clear-channel KFI in Los Angeles, at nearby 640 AM. As part of the agreement, the Federal Communications Commission issued a new license to Citadel under the slightly altered call letters KKOH on March 10, 1994. Citadel concluded the advantages of broadcasting at a full 50,000 watts from the most powerful facility in northern Nevada outweighed the nostalgic value of the last three-letter call sign issued for a "new station". AM 630 became Christian contemporary station KRCV, and now Fox Sports Radio outlet KPLY. KKOH continues to trade on the KOH call sign's legacy in Reno; nearly all verbal references drop the second "K".

Citadel merged with current owner Cumulus Media on September 16, 2011.
