= Mark Masters =

American media entrepreneur

Mark Masters is an American media entrepreneur, known for being the CEO of Talk Radio Network and its four sister networks.

== Early life ==
Mark Masters was born in 1964 in California. Masters' childhood was spent in Ventura County, California.

Masters spent his teen years in Selma and Grants Pass, Oregon. In his late twenties, Masters studied quality control and quality management under the tutelage of W. Edwards Deming, to which Masters attributes credit for his success in building successful talk radio enterprises.

== Career ==
Masters became the CEO of Talk Radio Network in 1998. He grew the company to become America's second-largest network syndicator of spoken word programming and launched or rebuilt eight of the country's ten largest syndicated talk shows, including The Dr. Laura Schlessinger Show and Coast to Coast with Art Bell.

While continuing to build TRN, Masters collaborated with Roger Ailes, CEO of Fox News, between 2003 and 2005, to create Fox News Radio. This included launching The Alan Colmes Show in 2003. Ailes wrote that Masters, "is one of the few true media entrepreneurs that has proven time and again to possess both large scale creative vision with the ability to execute on that vision in ways that have brought him both success and a reputation for excellence."

Masters was named one of the "40 Most Powerful People in Radio" by Radio Ink for eight years in a row through to 2013.

== See also ==
- Talk Radio Network
