= KTHO =

Radio station in South Lake Tahoe, California

- South Lake Tahoe, California; United States
- Broadcast area: Lake Tahoe; Reno-Sparks
- Frequency: 590 kHz

Ownership
- Owner: International Aerospace Solutions, Inc.

History
- First air date: March 17, 1963
- Last air date: November 15, 2021
- Call sign meaning: Tahoe

Technical information
- Facility ID: 51528
- Class: B
- Power: 2,500 watts (day); 500 watts (night)
- Transmitter coordinates: 38°55′0″N 119°57′46″W
- Translator: 96.1 K241BK (South Lake Tahoe)

KTHO (590 AM) was a commercial radio station licensed to South Lake Tahoe, California, United States, and served the Lake Tahoe Basin-Reno–Sparks metropolitan area. Last broadcasting a classic hits radio format, it also simulcast on South Lake Tahoe-based FM translator K241BK on 96.1 MHz.

The stations licenses were cancelled by the Federal Communications Commission on November 15, 2021, by letter to the licensee.

The station's license was last held by International Aerospace Solutions, Inc., a company owned by long-time Southern California broadcaster Darrell Wampler. After he took over operations of KTHO, Wampler retained KTHO operations manager Ed Crook and employed local Lake Tahoe radio personalities Paul Middlebrook as a media consultant, Bill Kingman as a technical advisor and Curtis Fong as on-air personality. Wampler was also heard on the station under his radio air name, "The Insane Darrell Wayne".

== History ==
The station first signed on the air on March 17, 1963, broadcasting middle of the road music and local news. On April 12, 1966, an FM sister station signed on at 103.1 MHz (today 102.9 KWYL). In March 2009, KTHO changed its format to classic rock, using the identification "590 K-Tahoe."

After the addition of an FM translator, making the station available on both FM and AM radio, the format moved to a more mass-appeal classic hits sound, focusing on the top songs of the 1970s and 80s.

On November 15, 2021, the FCC notified licensee International Aerospace Solutions (IAS) that the licenses of KTHO and associated translator K241BK had been cancelled. In its letter, the Commission presented information stating that while the AM signal had been off air due to the seizure of transmission equipment (due to nonpayment of tower rent), the FM translator had been heard on-air. IAS' legal representation had advised in October 2021 that the station had been operating from an unauthorized location.

In January 2022 KTHO switched to Ktahoe.com becoming an internet radio station playing rock and talk serving South Lake Tahoe, CA.
