= KNEV =

- Reno, Nevada; United States
- Broadcast area: Reno, Nevada
- Frequency: 95.5 MHz
- Branding: 95.5 The Vibe

Programming
- Format: Classic hip hop
- Affiliations: Compass Media Networks

Ownership
- Owner: Cumulus Media; (Radio License Holding CBC, LLC)
- Sister stations: KBUL-FM, KKOH, KWYL

History
- First air date: December 25, 1953
- Former call signs: KHQM (1953, CP)
- Call sign meaning: Nevada

Technical information
- Licensing authority: FCC
- Facility ID: 11244
- Class: C
- ERP: 71,000 watts
- HAAT: 695 meters (2,280 ft)
- Translator: 99.3 K257AX (Battle Mountain)

Links
- Public license information: Public file; LMS
- Webcast: Listen live; Listen live; Listen live (via iHeartRadio)
- Website: 955thevibe.com

KNEV (95.5 FM) is a commercial radio station located in Reno, Nevada. KNEV airs a classic hip hop music format branded as "95.5 The Vibe". The station rebroadcasts on translator K257AX at 99.3 FM in Battle Mountain, Nevada. It is owned by Cumulus Media. Its studios are located on Plumb Lane in South Reno, and its transmitter is located on McClellan Peak northeast of Carson City, Nevada.

== History ==
KNEV is the longest continuously operating FM station in the state of Nevada, having signed on Christmas Day 1953. Since its original air date in 1953, KNEV has maintained its original call sign and frequency. KNEV was originally an easy listening station during the daytime and classical after 6 p.m. and all day on Sundays and remained that way for many years. In January 1978, Everett Cobb sold the station to McClatchy Newspapers, which also owns KOH. The station was later sold to Sierra Pacific Broadcasting Co., in 1982. In 1992, the station was relaunched as "Magic 95", with a soft adult contemporary format, and would compete with crosstown station KRNO (Sunny 106.9).

In 1995, the station shifted towards a hot AC format, while retaining the "Magic" branding. The 1970s songs were dropped from the playlist as the station focused on hits from the 1980s and 1990s. In 2001, KNEV rebranded as "Mix 95.5" and became an adult top 40 station.

In November 2004, the station flipped to an all-Christmas format and brought back the "Magic" branding. On December 26, the station adopted a mainstream adult contemporary format.

On October 7, 2015, at 5 p.m., KNEV flipped to classic hip hop as "95.5 The Vibe". The change came after a brief 15 minute stunt of Christmas music after "Magic" signed off with "Celebration" by Kool and the Gang.

== Translator ==
Call sign	Frequency	City of license	FID	ERP (W)	HAAT	Class	Transmitter coordinates	FCC info
K257AX	99.3 FM	Battle Mountain, Nevada	36494	78	221 m (725 ft)	D	40°32′9.6″N 116°41′2.3″W	LMS
