= Coast to Coast AM =

American radio talk show

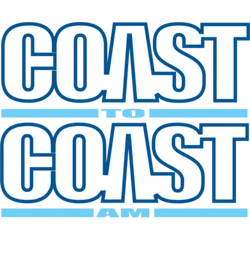
- Genre: Talk radio
- Running time: 175 minutes, 20 seconds
- Country of origin: United States; Canada; Philippines (2006–2010)
- Syndicates: Premiere Networks
- Hosted by: George Noory (weeknights and 1st Sunday); George Knapp (4th Sunday); Michele Tafoya substitute host; Rich Berra; Ryan Wrecker; Richard Syrett
- Announcer: Dick Ervasti
- Created by: Art Bell
- Recording studio: Sherman Oaks, California; 34°9′12″N 118°27′56″W
- Remote studios: St. Louis, MO (Noory); Las Vegas, NV (Knapp); Phoenix, AZ (Berra); Detroit, MI (Wrecker); Toronto (Syrett)
- Original release: 1988 – present
- Opening theme: "Chase (Theme from Midnight Express)" by Giorgio Moroder
- Ending theme: "Inca Dance" or "Ghost Dance" by Cusco (Shows hosted by Noory and Knapp); "Listening to Coast to Coast" by UFO Phil (Fridays); "Midnight in the Desert" by Crystal Gayle
- Website: wwwcoasttocoastam.com
- Podcast: Streamlink

Coast to Coast AM is an American late-night radio talk show that deals with a variety of topics, most frequently relating to either the paranormal or conspiracy theories. It was hosted by creator Art Bell from its inception in 1988 until 2003; the program is currently hosted by George Noory. The program is distributed by Premiere Networks, a subsidiary of iHeartMedia, both as part of its talk network and separately as a syndicated program. The program now airs seven nights a week from 1:00 a.m. to 5:00 a.m. ET. It airs on over 600 affiliates, and has repeatedly been called the most popular overnight show in the country.

== History ==
In 1978, Art Bell created and hosted West Coast AM, a late-night political talk/call-in show on Las Vegas radio station KDWN. In 1988, Bell and Alan Corberth renamed the show Coast to Coast AM and moved its studios from the Plaza Hotel in Las Vegas to Bell's home in Pahrump. After Bell's retirement, the show was hosted by various personalities, including Mike Siegel, George Noory, and others.

At its peak, Coast to Coast AM under Bell was syndicated by Premiere Radio Network, and aired on more than 500 radio stations and boasted a weekly listening audience in excess of 10 million. Since 2013, the weekly listener numbers have declined to 2.5 million. According to estimates by Talkers Magazine, Coast to Coast AM has a cumulative weekly audience of around 2.75 million unique listeners tuning in for at least five minutes, making it the most listened-to program in its time slot. By 2010, the program was reported to be the most popular overnight show in the country, echoed by The New York Times in 2017, who cited Nielsen ratings.

The show is estimated to be carried by over 600 US affiliates, along with a limited number of FM stations; it also airs on many Canadian affiliates, several of which stream the show on their stations' websites. The affiliate group is fronted by 12 clear-channel stations, among them WBT in Charlotte, WHO in Des Moines, WWL in New Orleans, WOR in New York City, KFBK in Sacramento, KFI in Los Angeles, and WTAM in Cleveland. The show is also carried by Sirius XM Radio, on its Road Dog Trucking channel 146.

== Criticism ==
Scholars have criticized Coast to Coast AM for promoting pseudohistoric and pseudoscientific ideas. Historian Ronald H. Fritze characterized the show as an "especially influential example" of the trend in modern media to disseminate false history and fake science.

According to State University of New York (SUNY) professor Paul Arras, early shows hosted by Art Bell featured guests that were frequently pseudoscientists, but "regardless of their reputation, all guests are presented as experts." According to Arras, "Bell seems to believe much of what even his wildest guests say". Boston College professor Michael C. Keith noted a "characteristic of distrust and fear that is a part of the text of Coast to Coast—fear of the unknown, fear of invasion, fear of being taken over by some kind of evil force".

Religious Studies lecturer David G. Robertson observed that "sweeping conspiratorial revisionist histories and ancient alien narratives" are a frequent feature of the show. Nolan Higdon of California State University, East Bay, speculated that programs like Coast to Coast AM that "propagate unsubstantiated claims" were "potentially dangerous".

According to The Atlantic senior editor Timothy Lavin, host George Noory "lets clearly delusional or pseudoscientific assertions slide by without challenge". Lavin wrote that "Coast to Coast AM has perfected a charged and conspiratorial worldview that now pervades American media".

In 1998, the Committee for Skeptical Inquiry awarded show host Art Bell their mocking "Snuffed Candle Award", citing his work "for encouraging credulity, presenting pseudoscience as genuine, and contributing to the public's lack of understanding of the methods of scientific inquiry". CSI fellow Joe Nickell has appeared on the show occasionally as "a voice of skepticism", saying his goal was to explain and demystify the "bizarre topics 'Coast to Coast' deals with", such as Bigfoot and ghosts.

== Hosts ==
=== Art Bell ===
Bell was the original host of the show, starting in 1988. He announced his retirement in 2000, but would return as show host, retire, and return again a number of times. Bell died in April 2018.

=== Mike Siegel ===
Mike Siegel hosted the show from April 2000 until February 2001. He became a frequent substitute for Bell in late 1999, and when Bell announced his retirement in early 2000, he recommended Siegel to succeed him. Siegel maintained the format of the show that Bell had created, but his personal style was very different, and the show became less popular. Siegel hosted the show from Seattle, Washington, where he lived. Early in 2001, Bell decided to return, and Siegel left the show.

=== Ian Punnett ===
Ian Punnett hosted the show sporadically, as either guest host or main host, between 1998 and 2012, and from 2018 to 2023. Punnett died in December 2023.

=== John B. Wells ===
In January 2012, John B. Wells replaced Punnett as host of the Saturday evening and the second Sunday evening programs.

=== George Noory ===
George Noory first took over show hosting duties in 2003 as a replacement for Bell, but was temporarily discontinued after Bell returned, citing disagreements with Noory. After Bell's death in April 2018, Noory said that the two were "not that close" personally and that there were major differences in their approaches. Despite this, Noory said that Bell was "instrumental in me being where I am right now." Noory currently hosts the show on weeknights and on the first Sunday of every month.

=== George Knapp ===
George Knapp joined the show in 2007 and currently hosts on the third and fourth Sundays of each month.

=== Others ===
Guest hosts have included Hilly Rose, Barbara Simpson, Rollye James, Robert Salas, Dave Schrader, Connie Willis, Lisa Garr, Richard Syrett, Rob Simone, and Jimmy Church.

== Guests ==
The show featured a number of guests, some recurring.

- David Edward, author and Old World researcher
- Katherine Albrecht, consumer rights advocate
- Capt. Martin Bayerle, treasure hunter, author of The Tsar's Treasure
- Howard Bloom, author of The God Problem, The Lucifer Principle, Global Brain, Reinventing Capitalism and former publicist for Prince and Michael Jackson
- Sylvia Browne, psychic
- Gerald Celente, economic and political forecaster
- Loren Coleman, cryptozoologist and author on issues relating to new animal discoveries and the sightings of Bigfoot, the Yeti, the Loch Ness Monster, and other cryptids
- Jerome Corsi, author of sensationalist books on Hillary Clinton, John Kerry, and Barack Obama. Joined InfoWars, as correspondent.
- Peter Davenport, head of the National UFO Reporting Center, a non-profit corporation which documents UFO sightings
- Lionel Fanthorpe, author, director of Media Studies at Cardiff Academy, president of the Association for the Scientific Study of Anomalous Phenomena, and president of the British UFO Research Association
- James H. Fetzer, conspiracy theorist on Sandy Hook Elementary School shooting. Fetzer claims that the assassination of President John F. Kennedy was a "government hit job" and that "the Zapruder film is a fake".
- Catherine Austin Fitts, politically conservative economist; was Assistant Secretary of Housing/Federal Housing Commissioner at HUD in the first Bush Administration
- Stanton Friedman, former nuclear physicist; author and ufologist who focused on the Roswell UFO incident
- Rosemary Ellen Guiley, author who discusses paranormal, visionary, and spiritual topics
- Richard C. Hoagland, former museum curator who was a major figure in the show's history, discussing issues relating to NASA's activities, space anomalies, and alleged extraterrestrial architecture (the Face on Mars and vast glass domes on the Moon). Hoagland was replaced as "science adviser" by Robert Zimmerman in June 2015 and developed digital radio chat-shows of his own.
- Linda Moulton Howe, reporter and ufologist. Famous as pioneer in the study of cattle mutilations and crop circles.
- David Icke, New World Order conspiracy theorist
- Alex Jones, radio talk show host, New World Order conspiracy theorist, filmmaker, and political activist
- Michio Kaku, mainstream theoretical physicist who typically discusses topics involving string theory, quantum physics, astrophysics, and other hard sciences
- Steve Kates, weekly correspondent on Coast to Coast AM sharing relevant astronomy and space science insights
- The Amazing Kreskin, magician
- Peter Lance, investigative journalist, specializing mainly in terrorism and the Mafia
- Bob Lazar, self-proclaimed physicist and president of United Nuclear Scientific Equipment & Supplies; renowned for disclosing his supposed employment at a secret government facility called S-4, and his alleged work reverse engineering extraterrestrial craft.
- Nancy Lieder, Niburu cataclysm advocate
- Gail Lynn, inventor of the Harmonic Egg and author of Unlocking the Ancient Secrets to Healing
- Mr. Lobo, horror host of nationally syndicated cult film television series Cinema Insomnia
- George Lutz, known for the Amityville Horror
- Eugene Mallove, cold fusion advocate
- Jim Marrs, author mostly known for "Crossfire", a discussion of the Warren Commission conclusions and also commentator on "hidden history" and the paranormal
- Malachi Martin, Catholic priest, theologian and professor, known for sometimes controversial views concerning the Catholic Church
- Dick Morris, former advisor to President Clinton.
- William Luther Pierce, neo-Nazi and author of The Turner Diaries
- Stan Romanek, an alleged UFO abductee. George Noory arranged to have Stan take a lie detector test over some of his claims of alien visitations, which Romanek failed.
- Whitley Strieber, author of Communion and many other books. A frequent guest on the show since the 1990s.
- Zecharia Sitchin, author promoting an explanation for human origins involving ancient astronauts
- Giorgio A. Tsoukalos, one of the hosts on History Channel's Ancient Aliens, and the publisher of Legendary Times magazine, a periodical that is centered on the ancient astronaut theory
- UFO Phil (aka Phil Hill), a comedic singer, songwriter, and claimed alien abductee. He created the program's Friday end theme, "Listening to Coast to Coast". He has appeared in various media venues, including UFO Phil: The Movie (2008) and The Gong Show.
- Peter Ward, paleontologist who specializes in mass extinctions and is famous for his Rare Earth hypothesis
- Kevin Warwick, professor of cybernetics who discusses his research with implants, artificial intelligence and robotics—especially cyborgs

== Associated shows ==
Several shows associated with Coast to Coast AM have aired in the slot immediately preceding the late Saturday night edition of the program, from 6:00 p.m. to 10:00 p.m. Pacific Time.

=== Dreamland ===
Dreamland was another Art Bell creation, nearly identical to Coast to Coast AM but less caller driven. Bell recorded Dreamland on Friday afternoons where the show streamed live over the internet and listeners could call in towards the end of the show. The show then aired at various times on different stations during the weekend, but doing eight shows a week got to be too much and he handed over control of the show to Whitley Strieber. Many affiliates aired the show before Coast to Coast AM on Sunday nights, but Premiere Radio preempted that time spot after it began to syndicate Matt Drudge, and then dropped the program entirely.

=== Coast to Coast Live ===
Upon Art Bell's January 2006 return, Ian Punnett hosted Coast to Coast Live on Saturdays from 9:00 p.m. to 1:00 a.m. Eastern Time. A spinoff of the original Coast to Coast AM, the show covered similar topics as its flagship program. With Bell's July 2007 retirement, Coast to Coast Live was discontinued, with Punnett returning to host the regular Saturday edition.

=== Art Bell, Somewhere in Time ===
Replacing Coast to Coast Live in the late Saturday time slot is a series of reruns of classic Art Bell episodes of Coast to Coast AM, airing under the title Somewhere in Time.

=== Midnight in the Desert ===
Midnight in the Desert was a live radio and podcast which Art Bell founded. The program was later hosted by Heather Wade and then by Dave Schrader.

== See also ==
- Art Bell's Dark Matter
- Paranormal radio shows
