= The Enemy Within (Savage book) =

2004 book by Michael Savage

The Enemy Within: Saving America from the Liberal Assault on Our Schools, Faith, and Military
- Author: Michael Savage
- Language: English
- Subject: Conservative ideology
- Publisher: Thomas Nelson
- Publication date: January 8, 2004
- Publication place: United States
- Pages: 272 pp
- ISBN: 0-7852-6102-8
- OCLC: 53284919
- Preceded by: The Savage Nation
- Followed by: Liberalism is a Mental Disorder

The Enemy Within: Saving America from the Liberal Assault on Our Schools, Faith, and Military, radio talk show host Michael Savage's nineteenth book, was published in 2003 and spent seven weeks on the New York Times best seller list, peaking at #7.
