= KWYL =

Radio station in South Lake Tahoe, California

Coordinates: 39.310°N 119.885°W

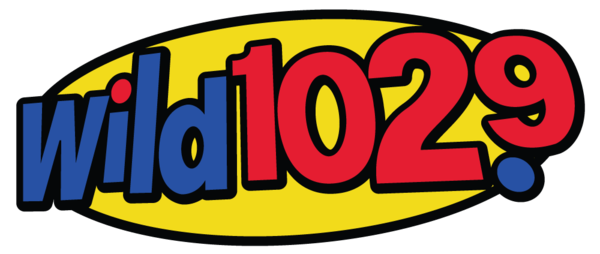
- South Lake Tahoe, California; United States
- Broadcast area: Reno metropolitan area
- Frequency: 102.9 MHz (HD Radio)
- Branding: Wild 102.9

Programming
- Format: Rhythmic contemporary

Ownership
- Owner: Cumulus Media; (Radio License Holding CBC, LLC)
- Sister stations: KBUL-FM, KKOH, KNEV

History
- First air date: 1966 (as KTHO-FM at 103.1)
- Former call signs: KTHO-FM (1966–1990); KZFF (1990–1992); KGLE (1992–1996); KZZF (1996–2000); KNVQ (2000–2003)
- Former frequencies: 103.1 MHz (1966-1980s)
- Call sign meaning: K WYL = WYLD. Pronounced WILD

Technical information
- Licensing authority: FCC
- Facility ID: 67816
- Class: C
- ERP: 39,000 watts
- HAAT: 892 meters (2927 ft)
- Translator: 106.1 K291AA (Battle Mountain)

Links
- Public license information: Public file; LMS
- Webcast: Listen live; Listen live; Listen live (via iHeartRadio)
- Website: wild1029.com

KWYL (102.9 MHz) is a commercial FM radio station licensed to South Lake Tahoe, California, and serving the Reno metropolitan area. The station broadcasts in full 5.1 digital surround sound and has a rhythmic contemporary radio format. It is owned by Cumulus Media. The studios and offices are located on Plumb Lane in South Reno.

KWYL has an effective radiated power (ERP) of 39,000 watts. The transmitter is in New Washoe City, Nevada, near Slide Mountain, amid the towers for other Reno-area FM and TV stations. Programming can also be heard on a 250 watt FM translator, 106.1 K291AA in Battle Mountain, Nevada.

== History ==
In April 1966, the station signed on the air as KTHO-FM at 103.1 MHz. It was owned by the Emerald Broadcasting Company, simulcasting the programming of its sister station KTHO 590 AM, both licensed then to Tahoe Valley, California. The licensing was changed to South Lake Tahoe when Tahoe Valley became part of the newly incorporated City of South Lake Tahoe. The AM-FM simulcast format featured middle of the road music per the Billboard magazine "Easy Listening" charts. KTHO-AM-FM also used news and information from ABC News Radio.

In 1973, KTHO-FM started a separately programmed beautiful music format that was largely automated. Later, its call sign was changed to KZFR ("K-Zephyr"), then briefly another change, but changed again to KZFF when its sought previous KZFR letters had already been reassigned elsewhere.

In the early 1980s, the station slightly shifted its dial position from 103.1 to 102.9 which allowed more coverage from a new transmitter location atop Genoa Peak on the eastern side of Lake Tahoe. A new ownership of the AM-FM combo sold-off the FM station to a Carson City, Nevada, operator who made another change of call-letters but that station was short-lived. Ultimately, and with another change of ownership, the transmitter site was moved again, to Slide Mountain, NV, affording greatly increased power and coverage. With its current call-sign KWYL at 102.9 and broadcasting from Reno, NV, it remains licensed as a South Lake Tahoe, CA station.

KWYL began broadcasting in 2001 as "Wild 93.7", but in 2003 switched frequencies to 102.9, giving the station more signal coverage. Prior to this change, it was a rhythmic oldies outlet known as KGVN ("93.7 The Groove") from 2000 to 2001.

The 93.7 signal was later used by two more top 40s stations after KWYL: Rhythmic KYWD ("93.7 The Bomb") from 2003 to 2004, and KWNZ, which later returned to its former home at 97.3 as mainstream urban KSGG, only to later move to an AM signal and a combined FM translator/HD2 channel by 2013; the AM switched formats to Sports in March 2014 but the HD2/FM translator broadcasts continues on as the sub channels of Top 40/CHR rival KLCA. KWYL, which had reported to music trades as a Mainstream Top 40 while still in a rhythmic top 40 direction, was officially moved to Mediabase's Rhythmic panel in April 2014 (BDS followed suit in June 2016)
