= Michael Savage =

American radio talk show host and author

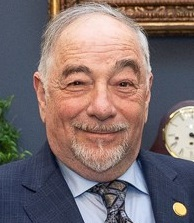
- Savage at the White House in 2018
- Born: Michael Alan Weiner; March 31, 1942 (age 84); The Bronx, New York, U.S.
- Education: Queens College (BS); University of Hawaii at Manoa (MS, MA); University of California, Berkeley (PhD)
- Occupations: Political and social commentator, author and former radio talk show host
- Political party: Independent
- Movement: Conservative
- Spouses: Carol Ely (m. 1964; div. 1967) Janet Roll (m. 1967)
- Children: 2, including Russell Weiner
- Website: michaelsavage.com

Michael Alan Weiner (born March 31, 1942) known by his professional name Michael Savage, is an American author, political commentator, activist, and former radio host. Savage is best known as the host of The Savage Nation, a nationally syndicated talk show that aired on Talk Radio Network across the United States until 2021, and in 2009 was the second most listened-to radio talk show in the country with an audience of over 20 million listeners on 400 stations across the United States. From October 23, 2012, to January 1, 2021, Michael Savage had been syndicated by Cumulus Media and Westwood One. He holds master's degrees from the University of Hawaii in medical botany and medical anthropology, and a Ph.D. from the University of California, Berkeley in nutritional ethnomedicine. As Michael Weiner, he has written books on nutrition, herbal medicine, and homeopathy; as Michael Savage, he has written several political books that have reached The New York Times Best Seller list.

Savage has summarized his political philosophy in three words: borders, language, and culture. He has characterized his views as conservative nationalism, while critics have characterized them as "fostering extremism". He supports the English-only movement and argues that liberalism and progressivism are degrading American culture. Although his radio delivery is mainly characterized as politically themed, he also often covers topics such as medicine, nutrition, music, literature, history, theology, philosophy, sports, business, economics, and culture, and tells personal anecdotes.

In 2009, Savage was permanently banned from entering the United Kingdom for "seeking to provoke others to serious criminal acts and fostering hatred".

== Early life and education ==
Savage was born Michael Alan Weiner in the Bronx, New York, one of three children of Benjamin Weiner, a Jewish immigrant from Russia. His mother, Rae, was from Montreal, Canada.

He described his childhood as difficult, with a "gruff, profane" father who would frequently criticize and belittle him. His younger brother, Jerome, was born with developmental disabilities and was unable to hear or speak. Jerome died in 1969. His father, the owner of an antiques shop, died of a heart attack at age 57 in 1970, and his mother died in 2003.

After graduating from Jamaica High School in 1958, Weiner attended Queens College, where he earned a bachelor's degree in biology in 1963. After college, Weiner taught high school for several years in New York City. His first marriage in 1964 to Carol Ely ended in divorce, and he remarried in 1967 after meeting his current wife, Janet. During this time, Weiner also worked for famous psychedelic drug advocate Timothy Leary as keeper of the stone gatehouse on the Hitchcock Cattle Company estate in Millbrook, New York, to which Leary had been given access. Leary hired him to the post because Savage did not use LSD. Weiner then studied at the University of Hawaii at Manoa, earning a Master of Science in botany in 1970 and a Master of Arts in anthropology in 1972. He obtained a PhD in 1978 from the University of California, Berkeley, in nutritional ethnomedicine. His thesis was titled Nutritional Ethnomedicine in Fiji.

== Shift in political opinions ==
Weiner introduced himself to certain writers in the North Beach neighborhood of San Francisco in the 1970s. He befriended and traveled with Beat poets Allen Ginsberg and Lawrence Ferlinghetti. Weiner maintained a correspondence with Ginsberg consisting of ten letters and three postcards across four years, which is maintained with Ginsberg's papers at Stanford University. One letter asked Ginsberg and Ferlinghetti to come do a poetry reading, so others could "hear and see and know why I adore your public image." Another acquaintance was poet and author Neeli Cherkovski, who says that Weiner dreamed of becoming a stand-up comic in the mold of Lenny Bruce.

Acquaintance Robert Cathcart says that by 1980, in his private conversations with Weiner, he knew him to have conservative political views. Schwartz stated Savage became alienated from the North Beach scene in the early 1980s. Weiner had intense arguments with his liberal friends. When asked about his shift in politics and other views, Weiner replied, "I was once a child; I am now a man." Weiner has cited many occurrences in his life that helped shape his conservative views. Weiner states that his opinions on welfare were partly shaped by his first job out of college as a social worker. He described one incident in which his supervisor had him deliver a check to a welfare client to furnish their apartment, while his own apartment was furnished with cardboard boxes. Another turning point occurred for him as a writer of health and nutrition books in the 1980s, when he experienced what he saw as "political opposition" after making the suggestion that the closure of homosexual bathhouses might be necessary in response to the emerging HIV/AIDS epidemic. In 1994 his final health and nutrition manuscript, Immigrants and Epidemics, was rejected by publishers for being inflammatory.

In 1996 after Weiner rebranded as Savage, he applied to become the Dean of the Graduate School of Journalism at the University of California, Berkeley. The university instead selected award-winning journalist and China scholar Orville Schell. Savage sued the university, contending discrimination for being conservative. Savage later dropped the lawsuit.

== Career as commentator ==
=== Radio ===
The rejection by publishers of his 1994 manuscript about illegal immigration and epidemics prompted Weiner (adopting the Savage pseudonym) to record a demo tape with a mock radio talk show about the contents of the work. He mailed this tape to 250 radio stations in an attempt to change careers and become a radio talk show host. On March 21, 1994, Savage began his radio career on KGO (a San Francisco news/talk radio station) as a fill-in host for liberal Ray Taliaferro's overnight show and later as a weekend host. At the time, his slogan was "To the right of Rush and to the left of God." The show quickly became a local hit.

Later in 1994, KGO parent company Capital Cities/ABC Inc. purchased the station KSFO and changed it to a conservative talk format. On January 2, 1995, the first day of KSFO's new format, Savage debuted as host of afternoon drive time show The Savage Nation. By 2000, Savage was the most popular afternoon drive host among all adults in San Francisco Arbitron ratings.

In 1999, Talk Radio Network began syndicating part of The Savage Nation nationally. Starting September 21, 2000, The Savage Nation became an entirely national show distributed by TRN.

In mid-2006, Savage had 8–10 million listeners per week, which made his show the third most widely heard broadcast in the United States at that time. Savage has described his listeners as "literate callers with intelligence, wit, and energy." He has described his show's production as one with a "... hard edge combined with humor and education ... Those who listen to me say they hear a bit of Plato, Henry Miller, Jack Kerouac, Moses, Jesus, and Frankenstein." Mark de la Viña of the San Jose Mercury News wrote of Savage: "In contrast to Rush Limbaugh, Sean Hannity and Laura Schlessinger, Bay Area-based Savage mixes conservative diatribe and blunt observations with acerbic humor and the gift of gab."

By 2009, The Savage Nation had an audience of 8 to 10 million listeners on 400 stations across the United States, making it the second most listened-to radio talk show in the country at the time. Around that time, Savage asked his audience for their opinion prior to consenting to a profile interview by Kelefa Sanneh of The New Yorker; Savage eventually accepted that offer and the New Yorker profile, titled "Party of One", was published in the August 3, 2009, issue, which covered Savage's life and personality in great detail.

On September 10, 2009, KNEW (910 kHz) in Savage's home market of San Francisco announced that it was dropping his program and replacing him with John and Ken from sister station KFI (640 kHz)—Los Angeles. John Scott, program director of KNEW said in an email that the station was headed "... in a different philosophical and ideological direction, featuring more contemporary content and more local information." According to Arbitron monthly ratings, KNEW dropped in the ratings since Savage was let go. San Francisco station KTRB picked up the program for the San Francisco market, and saw a ratings boost in the afternoon drive. However, the program was among the first casualties when KTRB went into receivership in September 2010.

On January 22, 2010, Savage revealed to his audience that a writer for Playboy had contacted him via email to do a lengthy interview, and again asked his listeners if he should accept the offer. During the show, Savage read from personal emails between the Playboy writer and himself. The writer admitted to being a listener of the Savage Nation but a critic of the profile done by The New Yorker. The writer also stated that the purpose of the interview was to "rattle" Playboy's readers. On May 12, 2010, Savage revealed that he had granted the interview at his home. Playboy published the interview in June 2010. He read from a pre-publication copy of the 8,000-word Playboy interview, in which the writer expressed animosity for Savage and his views. Savage said that he was disappointed at the lack of journalistic objectivity, but did not harbor hatred for the writer. He referred back to the New Yorker interview by Kelefa Sanneh, and praised Sanneh as a "real writer" who had understood his subject.

On September 27, 2012, Savage's talk show left the airwaves after he won a legal battle with Talk Radio Network, his longtime employer, and his attorney said discussions with new networks were underway. Savage began an occasional series of video webcasts via Ustream on September 30, 2012. On October 17, 2012, Savage and his new syndicator Cumulus Media Networks announced that they had made a deal and the program, after several weeks off the air, would be returning as of October 23, 2012. By April 2013, according to the radio industry's Talkers Magazine, Savage had 3.5+ million weekly listeners, putting him in a six-way tie for sixth place, and six talk show hosts getting 7.5+ million weekly listeners. On September 26, 2013, Cumulus Media Networks announced that Michael Savage's radio show, The Savage Nation, would move to the 3p-6p ET time-slot beginning in January 2014. This time slot had been occupied by Sean Hannity.

In January 2015, it was announced that Savage and Westwood One had reached agreement on a long-term contract renewal for The Savage Nation. In January 2019, Savage in collaboration with Westwood One introduced a podcast format with a mixture of live-broadcast and studio material. On March 24, 2019, Savage celebrated the 25th anniversary of the radio show. On January 1, 2021, The Savage Nation was discontinued by Cumulus Media and Westwood One.

=== TV ===
Savage briefly hosted a political talk show on MSNBC from March 8, 2003, to July 7, 2003. MSNBC president Erik Sorenson had hired Savage to host the one-hour show despite previous criticism of the network in his book The Savage Nation and the objections of several NBC employees. Sorenson called Savage "brash, passionate and smart," and promised that he would provide "compelling opinion and analysis with an edge." After four months, Savage was fired from the show after remarks made in response to a caller, later identified as prank caller Bob Foster, caused controversy in the gay community.

Savage is a regular guest on Newsmax television with appearances on Stinchfield and The Count. Savage announced in a segment during President Trump's Inauguration on January 20, 2025, that he will be hosting a new program on Newsmax called The Michael Savage Show.

=== Podcast ===
In 2019 Savage launched a podcast. The Savage Nation Podcast posted episodes on Tuesdays, Thursdays, and Fridays.

== Views ==
Michael Savage calls himself an "independent-minded individualist" and says that he "fits no stereotype". In a 2006 interview, Savage cited Barry Goldwater as an influence, saying "I'm a Goldwater conservative…. If [another] Goldwater appeared, I'd work for him, I'd give money to him."

Savage criticizes big government as well as liberalism and liberal activism, and accuses the mainstream news media of liberal bias. He considers the three aspects that define a nation as borders, language, and culture; those aspects inspired the motto of the Paul Revere Society.

=== Wildlife conservation ===
Savage is a longtime advocate of wildlife conservation, and often points out that "conservative" and "conservation" have the same root, meaning "to conserve". He argues that conservatives should "own" environmental protection and conservation of wildlife resources. Savage opposed President Trump's revoking of an Obama-era trophy hunting ban, stating "Dominion over animals doesn't mean destroying or terrorizing them".

A March 2018 article at The Hill quotes him at greater length: "Conservative radio host Michael Savage has also spoken out against the Fish & Wildlife Service proposed policy this week, writing in a blog post Wednesday that he 'felt betrayed' by the administration's secret decision after having previously spoken in person with Trump on the issue.

'I had spent a dinner talking to the President about environmental issues, and especially this, and this is what happened anyway,' Savage wrote. 'I made it clear that this was a red line that could not be crossed, that now elephants, lions and other big game had a target painted on them. I explained that the root of 'conservative' is the same as 'conservation' and the two do not need to be diametrically opposed. I explained what was meant by dominion, as I carefully spelled out in God Faith and Reason.' 'We hope that the president will step in here and overrule this order,' he added.'

The private meeting with President Donald Trump at Mar-a-Lago followed a series of pleas on his radio show for Trump to support legislation that protected wildlife. In August 2019, following the Trump administration's reauthorization of the use of cyanide bombs against wild animals, Savage called on the White House and the US Environmental Protection Agency to reverse approval.

=== Immigration ===
Savage opposes illegal immigration, arguing that it contributed to the black tar heroin epidemic, that a large percentage of immigrant are prisoners, illegal use of public services, and diminishing American nationalism. in a tweet on May 17, 2019, Michael said, "Read my lips: no new immigrants." He frequently warns that migrants carry diseases. On March 28, 2006, following pro-immigration rallies in California, he encouraged his listeners to burn Mexican flags to protest illegal immigration from Mexico.

=== European Union ===
Savage is opposed to the European Union, describing it as "Hitler's dream of a united Europe under German control". He equates Britain's vote to leave the Union with the Second World War, saying it was "in many ways the Battle of Britain all over again". after Brexit, Savage accused the E.U. of planning a civil war to gain total control of the population for plans of "a new Soviet-style superstate, which have been long on the drawing books."

=== Republican presidential candidates ===
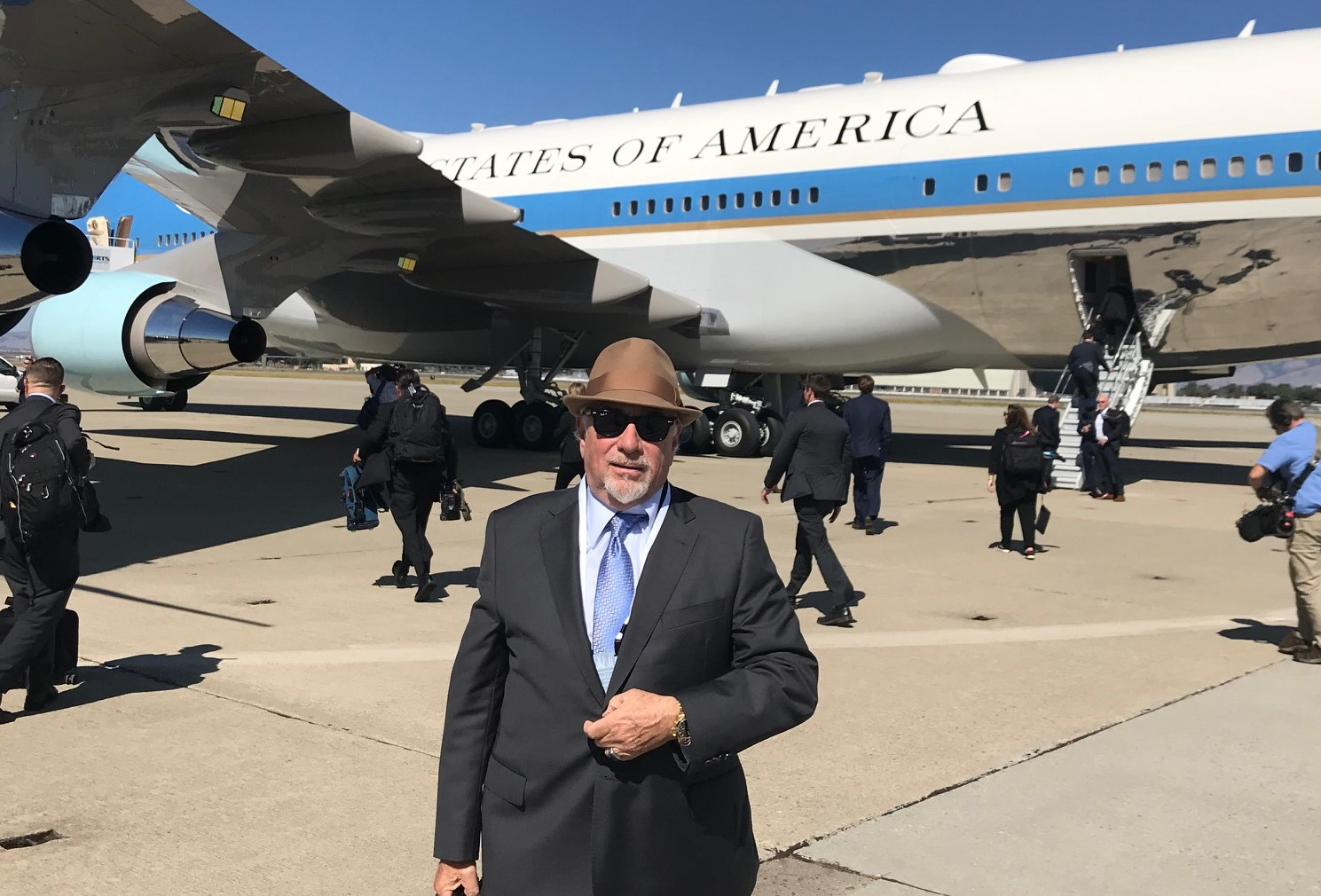
Savage at Moffett Federal Airfield in 2019 before flying on Air Force One with President Donald Trump

In 2003, Savage said that he voted in 2000 for George W. Bush "quite reluctantly, incidentally". In 2004, Savage and the Revere Society hosted a party at Schroeder's Cafe in San Francisco celebrating the re-election of Bush. Savage donated $5,600 to the campaign of Democratic candidate Jerry Brown in the 2006 California Attorney General election.

Savage strongly supported Donald Trump, a regular guest on his talk show, since Trump's June 2015 announcement of his candidacy in the United States 2016 presidential election. Trump has claimed to be a listener and a fan of Savage's show, and an April 2016 Salon article described Savage as having been a major influence on Trump's campaign.

Savage has disagreed strongly with some of Trump's actions and policies, including the appointment of John Bolton as National Security Advisor, the bombings of Syria, what Savage describes as a failure to get illegal immigration to the United States under control, and failure to protect endangered and vulnerable wild animals. Nevertheless, he endorsed Trump for president in the 2020 United States presidential election.

=== Dubai Ports World controversy ===
In early 2006, the administration of President George W. Bush approved sale of a port security contract to a company, Dubai Ports World (DP World), headquartered in The United Arab Emirates (UAE).

Michael Savage was highly influential in the defeat of the deal. On February 13, the first day it was reported in the news, "Savage used his radio show to attack the transfer of American homeland assets to a company owned by an Arab state." Savage's concerns were based in part on the fact that "two of the 9/11 suicide hijackers came from the United Arab Emirates, and much of the funding for the attacks flowed through United Arab Emirates banks." On his February 17 radio show, Savage interviewed Democratic Senator Chuck Schumer of New York, a longtime adversary with whom Savage otherwise agreed on the Dubai ports issue.

The White House was listening to Savage: "Though the deal had received some newspaper attention before then, Mr. Savage's angry message raised early concerns inside the Bush White House about trouble ahead." Savage and other opponents of the deal "generated a wave of anger from Americans across the country that left lawmakers in Washington -- by their own admission -- following their constituents much more than leading them." Lawmakers said the negative response from constituents was overwhelming. Congressional offices on Capitol Hill were deluged by phone calls and emails protesting the deal, and congressmen told of being pulled aside wherever they went in their districts. Rep. Don Manzullo, a Republican from Illinois who is chairman of the House subcommittee on small business, said "I got stopped all over the place," he said. "People are big-time upset."

=== "White genocide" ===
According to the Southern Poverty Law Center, Savage promotes the white genocide conspiracy theory, a white nationalist belief, which claims that white people are becoming extinct through forced assimilation or violent genocide. Savage blames Barack Obama and the Democratic Party for promoting the concept within the United States. He has claimed there is a "cultural genocide being promulgated against Caucasians".

=== COVID-19 pandemic and positions on vaccines ===
A January 31, 2020, article in Stat News quoted Savage's call for a stop to flights from China: "QUARANTINE! STOP TRAVELERS FROM CHINA NOW!" Two months later, an April 16, 2020 New York Times feature article credited Savage for being one of the first in the media, especially the conservative media, to take the COVID-19 epidemic seriously. On his radio show Savage used his credentials—a PhD with training in epidemiology—to speak to his fans on coronavirus research: How the virus is transmitted; which treatments were proving effective; and the difference between morbidity and mortality rates. "Savage's views were a departure from those of other conservative commentators, who made a concerted effort to deny that they downplayed the epidemic. Savage attacked their credibility and demanded that they be held accountable for misleading millions of Americans." As early as February 24, 2020, Savage was saying of Limbaugh and Hannity: "How can we not let our side be called on the carpet when they lie to the people?" Savage is also sharply critical of the Director of the NIAID, Dr. Anthony Fauci, dismissing him as "a grandstander" who mishandled the AIDS epidemic by refusing to close down the gay bathhouses. Savage believes that one-size-fits-all lockdowns are a threat to individual liberty, and calls instead for selective quarantine of at-risk populations.

In a May 4, 2020, article in the Washington Examiner, Savage is quoted as saying he will refuse to take a coronavirus vaccine, saying that it will likely be "ineffective and dangerous." Savage has a history of opposing the flu vaccine, for reasons he outlined in a January 15, 2013, interview. Savage argued that the Centers for Disease Control authorities have to guess what the vaccine should be made of. "So they choose five strains out of 250-plus strains of Influenza A, and if they don't choose the right one, you're going to get sick," he said. "So you're putting your faith in the CDC's ability to guess the one that might be a pandemic." He said that "this year" (2013), the CDC guessed right on two of the strains and wrong on one of them.

In contrast to his views on the flu vaccine, Savage supports vaccines, such as for polio, that last for many years because they address an infectious agent with a low mutation rate. A 2013 Ethics Alarms article recounts Savage saying that "...one of his heroes growing up was Jonas Salk, not because he invented the first effective polio vaccine, but because he refused to patent it, and gave it to the world for the benefit of humanity. A bit later, Savage noted that Albert Sabin, Salk's bitter rival who later invented the oral vaccine, also declined to profit from his invention. Could all this be true, I wondered? If it is true, why did I not know about it? Why doesn't everybody know about it? It is true. Asked why he didn't patent his vaccine, Salk famously answered, "Can you patent the sun?"

In 2021, he accepted wearing masks in indoor public places.

== Activism ==
=== Legal defense contributions ===
Savage has regularly donated money toward the legal defense of the U.S. Marines accused of murdering civilians in Haditha, Iraq; occasionally, Savage will offer proceeds from any sales through his website. Savage had regular contact with the attorneys of the accused and criticizes their treatment at Camp Pendleton. Savage has donated over $10,000 to the U.S. Marines Charity Defense Fund at the Thomas More Law Center. On April 25, 2007, he pledged $1 for each copy of Healing Children Naturally and Reducing the Risk of Alzheimer's purchased from his website to be donated to the U.S. Marines Defense Fund.

== Awards ==
On November 17, 2016, Savage was inducted into the National Radio Hall of Fame. Savage describes this event as "the capstone of my career".

Savage was nominated by Donald Trump to serve on the Board of Directors of The Presidio Trust in 2020. Savage frequently got into arguments with other board members, often writing them angry, abusive emails in all caps. On May 20, 2021, Savage was formally ordered by the Biden administration to resign from his position.

== Criticism and controversies ==
In July 2005, former CBS reporter Bernard Goldberg ranked Savage as number 61 in his book 100 People Who Are Screwing Up America. Goldberg wrote that "Savage's brand of over-the-top bile ... puts him right in there with the angriest haters of the Left." David Klinghoffer, a National Review columnist, speculated that The Savage Nation "is an act, a put-on". Various progressive advocacy groups such as GLAAD and FAIR accuse Savage of racism, homophobia, transphobia, and Islamophobia because of his controversial statements about homosexuality, Islam, feminism, sex education, and immigration.

On April 17, 2006, Savage said on the topic of Muslims, "They say, 'Oh, there's a billion of them.' I said, 'So, kill 100 million of them, then there'll be 900 million of them.' I mean, would you rather die—would you rather us die than them?" The remarks made by Savage were seriously criticized worldwide and was taken from an argument dealing with the possibility of a nuclear conflict in that region. This was repeated in the media after Savage was barred from entering the UK.

=== Controversial MSNBC exchange ===
Savage was hired by MSNBC to do a one-hour show which began in March 2003. Controversy arose four months later over remarks made in response to a caller who insulted Savage's teeth. Savage responded by asking if the caller was a "sodomite", and when the caller replied that he was, Savage said:

"Oh, so you're one of those sodomites. You should only get AIDS and die, you pig. How's that? Why don't you see if you can sue me, you pig. You got nothing better to do than to put me down, you piece of garbage. You got nothing to do today? Go eat a sausage and choke on it. Get trichinosis. Now, do we have another nice caller here who's busy because he didn't have a nice night in the bathhouse who's angry at me today? Put another – put another sodomite on ... no more calls? I don't care about these bums, they mean nothing to me. They're all sausages."

The interchange created a firestorm of protest including calls for his firing by the LGBT group GLAAD. Savage apologized on his radio program and on his website. He explained that he believed that MSNBC had gone to commercial to cover the gaffe of the attempted sabotage by a prank caller and that he was off the air at the time of the offensive comments, despite the fact that clips of the segment show Savage going to commercial after he made the comments. He also said his remarks were meant only to insult the caller, not all people with AIDS. Nevertheless, MSNBC fired him within days of the event.

=== Catholic Church and immigration ===
In March 2006, Savage criticized Roman Catholic assistance to illegal immigrants (in response to statements by Cardinal Roger Mahony of Los Angeles calling it "pastoral support"). Bill Donohue of the Catholic League canceled an appearance on the show, saying "what is not fine is Savage's diatribe about the 'greedy pigs' in the Catholic Church and how 'the institution is rotten from the top to the bottom.

=== C-SPAN broadcast of Talkers Award ===
When Talkers Magazine awarded Savage with the publication's annual "Freedom of Speech Award", C-SPAN opted not to broadcast a pre-recorded speech that had been sent by Savage. Although the award ceremony had received coverage in previous years, C-SPAN did not televise it due to its policy of televising such speeches only when delivered in person. Savage told his listeners to express their ire to C-SPAN through calls and e-mails to the organization.

=== Dispute with CAIR ===
In early November 2007, the Council on American–Islamic Relations (CAIR) called on radio listeners to contact companies that advertise on Savage's program to express their concerns about his comments concerning Muslims. Savage was quoted as saying Muslims "need deportation", and that adherents of Islam would do well to "take your religion and shove it up your behind" because "I'm sick of you."

On November 5, 2007, following a campaign by CAIR meant to get Savage off the air by alerting his sponsors to the nature of his comments, Citrix Systems, Inc. pulled its advertisements from his show.

Savage sued CAIR for copyright infringement for using excerpts from his show on CAIR's website. The suit alleged that CAIR's repackaging of Savage's comments was "deliberately designed to obscure the specific message conveyed by Michael Savage". The excerpts included Savage's characterization of the Qur'an as "a throwback document" and a "book of hate". CAIR called the suit "bizarre, sloppy and baseless". On July 25, 2008, United States district court Judge Susan Illston dismissed Savage's suit against CAIR, holding that the posting of the audio clip was protected under fair use. The court gave Savage the opportunity to file an amended complaint if he wanted to try to cure the defects in his suit. That amended complaint alleged that CAIR was a RICO conspirator in support of terror, including the 9/11 terror attack on the World Trade Center. Permission was granted to allow that filing but on August 14, 2008, however, Savage's lawyer, Daniel Horowitz, announced that Savage would not file an amended complaint and would drop the case. CAIR then sought attorneys fees against Savage; Judge Illston denied that request.

=== Autism ===
In July 2008, Savage said that the increasing rate of autism diagnoses was the result of "a racket" designed to get disability payments for "poorer families who have found a new way to be parasites on the government." He returned to the subject on his July 16, 2008, show with the following remarks:

Now, the illness du jour is autism. You know what autism is? I'll tell you what autism is. In 99 percent of the cases, it's a brat who hasn't been told to cut the act out. That's what autism is. What do you mean they scream and they're silent? They don't have a father around to tell them, "Don't act like a moron. You'll get nowhere in life. Stop acting like a putz. Straighten up. Act like a man. Don't sit there crying and screaming, idiot."

Also in July 2008, the progressive pressure group Media Matters for America picketed the studios of WOR in New York, along with parents of autistic children. WOR issued a statement saying, "We regret any consternation that his remarks may have caused to our listeners." Also that day, the insurance company Aflac pulled its advertising, and the Supertalk Mississippi radio network dropped Savage's program, replacing it with The Dennis Miller Show. Later that evening, Savage devoted his entire three-hour program to the subject, taking calls from parents who took issue with his comments. On that show Savage stated that his remarks had been "ripped out of context" by "far left Stalinists" who want him off of the air. He appeared on Larry King Live with Glenn Beck as the substitute host for Larry King, and said that the real issue he was commenting on was the overdiagnosis of children due to pharmaceutical companies' drive to drug children for higher profits. On July 25, 2008, Autism United advocates gathered to announce that several advertisers, including RadioShack, Sears, The Home Depot, and DirectBuy, would discontinue their support for Savage's show.

Savage's syndicator, Talk Radio Network, responded by releasing a lengthy statement, along with a selection of 20 audio clips drawn from Savage's discussions of autism, to show that the comments were taken out of context.

=== United Kingdom entry ban ===
On May 5, 2009, it was announced by then-Home Secretary Jacqui Smith of the Labour party that Savage was on a list of people banned from entering the United Kingdom as he is "considered to be engaging in unacceptable behavior by seeking to provoke others to serious criminal acts and fostering hatred which might lead to inter-community violence". During his radio broadcast on that same day, Savage threatened to sue Smith for defamation.

During a subsequent NPR talk show, Savage said that he has never advocated violence and repeatedly invoked the United States Constitution's First Amendment. After host Neal Conan pointed out that the U.S. Constitution does not apply to the United Kingdom, Savage replied, "No. Thank God I'm an American. But for this lunatic ... to link me up with Nazi skinheads who are killing people in Russia ... to put me in league with Hamas murderers who killed Jews on buses, is astonishing." Savage also called on his listeners to support him by canceling travel and business in Britain as well as by boycotting British-made goods, commenting, "If they want to play hardball, we'll play hardball." When a caller challenged Savage about his talk show rhetoric, Savage called him a "foaming lunatic ... someone in pajamas in a mental asylum ... You're nobody and I'm not going to talk to you!" At that point, Neal Conan invited him to leave.

Of the banning, the former Mayor of London, Boris Johnson, wrote: "America still has a constitutional protection of free speech, and I have been amazed ... to see how few people in this country are willing to stick up for that elementary principle ... a country once famous for free speech is now hysterically and expensively sensitive to anything that could be taken as a slight." After Johnson became Prime Minister in 2019, Savage's attorney requested the ban be overturned, however no action was taken by the Conservative government. In The Guardian, Catherine Bennett wrote: "The ban on Savage is so far from being a comprehensible act, so staggeringly capricious and stupid, as to defy evaluation." Sam Leith wrote: "Barring this shock-jock from Britain risks turning a rabid blabbermouth into a beacon for free speech."

=== Veteran PTSD ===
On October 14, 2014, Savage criticized veteran sufferers of post-traumatic stress disorder, accusing them of "weakness". According to Savage, "Everyone has depression in their life. But if the whole nation is told, 'boo-hoo-hoo, come and get a medication, come and get treatment, talk about mental illness.' You know what you wind up with? You wind up with Obama in the White House and liars in every phase of the government. That's what you wind up with. It is a weak, sick, nation. A weak, sick, broken nation. And you need men like me to save the country. You need men to stand up and say stop crying like a baby over everything ... No wonder we're being laughed at around the world. No wonder ISIS can defeat our military."

== Personal life ==
While in the South Pacific, he became fascinated with the 19th-century sailor Charles Savage, who was believed to have been the first man to bring firearms to Fiji.

Savage and his second wife, Janet, have two children, a daughter Rebecca Lin Weiner Yops born on March 2, 1967, and a son; his son, Russell Weiner, born on February 15, 1970, is the founder of the company that produces the Rockstar energy drink. Russell's mother, Janet, served as CFO of his company until July 2009. In 1974, Savage and his family moved to Fairfax, California, after Savage completed his master's degree at the University of Hawaii. Savage has homes in Larkspur and Tiburon in Marin County, California, an apartment in San Francisco, as well as residences in Beverly Hills, California, and West Palm Beach, Florida.

During the 1980s, Savage attended Friday night services at a Jewish Synagogue Chabad house in Berkeley. In a 2003 interview on The O'Reilly Factor, Savage has said that although he believes in God, he attends houses of worship only once or twice a year. In his 2012 book Trickle Down Tyranny, Savage wrote: "... I'm not religious. Do I believe in God? Sometimes I do, sometimes I don't." In his podcast aired 25 November 2020, Savage stated: "Trust in God. God leads my footsteps. God has determined that I will be on podcast come January. God determines a lot of things in our lives and you have to trust in God and just say its fate at a certain point. Now, I've always believed that we make our own fate. I've not been one of these leaves-in-a-stream type of personalities..."

In December 2019, Savage suffered a heart attack, but subsequently recovered and returned on air.

Savage has had many pet dogs throughout his life. His toy poodle Teddy died in late 2021.

== Books ==
In total, Savage has written 44 books, twenty under his real name of Michael Weiner, and twenty-four under the pseudonym of Michael Savage. As Michael Savage, his works include two #1 New York Times Best Sellers and three additional books which made The New York Times Best Seller list have also been reprinted under his alias of Michael Savage.

His earlier books as Michael A. Weiner, Ph.D., draw on his doctoral expertise in the field of nutritional ethnomedicine. In them, he advocates nutritional, herbal, and homeopathic options to approach the prevention and treatment of diseases such as poor diet, aging, arthritis, Alzheimer's disease, cancer, allergies, cocaine addiction, the common cold, and HIV/AIDS. He has also written about tree planting, beer-tasting, and nutritional cooking.

His more recent books as Michael Savage are political in nature and published by a variety of different companies. His recent works also include holiday family stories and thrillers.

In 1991, Savage self-published The Death of the White Male, an argument against affirmative action. In the book, Savage, calls affirmative action "reverse discrimination", and demonstrates his emerging philosophy. This eventually led to his starting the Paul Revere Society and he continues to sell the book to raise money for this group.

In January 2003, Savage published The Savage Nation: Saving America from the Liberal Assault on Our Borders, Language and Culture, his first major book under the pseudonym Michael Savage. The book directs attacks at "liberal media bias", the "dominating culture of 'she-ocracy'", gay activists, and liberals.

In January 2004, Savage published his second political book The Enemy Within: Saving America from the Liberal Assault on Our Schools, Faith, and Military. His next book, Liberalism Is a Mental Disorder, was released on April 12, 2005. Unlike The Savage Nation, both of these books cited sources for some of the more controversial claims made.

In April 2006, Savage released The Political Zoo. The book contains satirical profiles and cartoons of different public figures, most of whom are liberal political figures and celebrities, depicted in caricature as animals in the "Political Zoo", with Savage portrayed as the zoo keeper.

In October 2010, Savage released Trickle Up Poverty: Stopping Obama's Attack on Our Borders, Economy, and Security. Released through the HarperCollins imprint of William Morrow and Company, Savage argues in the book that "Americans are boiling mad over the way Congress and this Marxist/Leninist-oriented President are manipulating the current economic crisis to nationalize businesses."

In November 2010, it was confirmed that Savage had signed a deal to write two thrillers for publisher St. Martin's Press. The first political thriller, Abuse of Power, was released on September 13, 2011. The novel is based on "My fictionalized account of being banned from Britain and hunted by overbearing governments is set in the San Francisco only I know", said Savage. It is set in San Francisco, mainly in North Beach, as well as London, and Tel Aviv. It tells the story of a failed carjacking that reveals a government cover-up. A dark plot involving British officials and a terrorist group known as "the Hand of Allah". The publisher has described the novel by saying, "will make 9/11 look like child's play".

In 2014, Savage released Stop the Coming Civil War: My Savage Truth, in which Savage writes in part, "We are under assault from both inside and out as our government moves to consolidate its domestic power, while at the same time weakening our defenses against the growing power of our enemies."

In 2015, Savage released another a book titled Government Zero: No Borders, No Language, No Culture. In it he writes that the country has been left without the founding principles of his radio show, "borders, language and culture", and describes what he calls the destruction that the Presidency of Barack Obama brought to the country. He offers several solutions to rebuild the nation.

In 2016, Savage's book Scorched Earth: Restoring The Country After Obama. This work was a blueprint for how then candidate Donald Trump could help get the country back on the right track should he win the election.

In March 2017, Savage released what he said would be his last political book, Trump's War: His Battle For America. The book debuted at number one on The New York Times Best Seller list.

In November 2017, Savage released a non-political book on his search for spiritual truth, God, Faith, and Reason.

In October 2018, Savage published a book on American psychology, Stop Mass Hysteria: America's Insanity from the Salem Witch Trials to the Trump Witch Hunt. In it he discusses what he calls the many "loud flashpoints" that he believes have engulfed American thought over the nation's history, and relates those phenomena to what he describes as a current obsession with Trump hatred.

In June 2019, Savage published a new book of stories and anecdotes entitled A Savage Life.

== Bibliography ==
=== Literature as Michael A. Weiner ===
- Earth Medicine – Earth Foods: Plant Remedies, Drugs, and Natural Foods of the North American Indians, New York: Macmillan Publishers US, 1972, ISBN 0-02-625610-X
- Plant a Tree: A Working Guide to Regreening America, New York: Collier Books, 1975, ISBN 0-471-57104-0
- Bugs in the Peanut Butter: Dangers in Everyday Food, Boston: Little, Brown and Company, 1976, ISBN 0-316-92860-7
- Man's Useful Plants, New York: Macmillan Publishers US, 1976, ISBN 0-02-792600-1
- The Taster's Guide to Beer: Brews and Breweries of the World, New York: Macmillan Publishers US, 1977, ISBN 0-02-625600-2
- Weiner's Herbal: The Guide to Herb Medicine with Janet Weiner and Norman R. Farnsworth, New York: Stein and Day Publishers, 1980, ISBN 0-8128-2586-1 ISBN 0-8128-6023-3
- The Way of the Skeptical Nutritionist: A Strategy for Designing Your Own Nutritional Profile, New York: Macmillan Publishers US, 1981, ISBN 0-02-625620-7
- The Art of Feeding Children Well with Kathleen Goss, Warner Books, 1982, ISBN 0-446-97890-6
- Nutrition Against Aging, New York: Bantam Books, 1983, ISBN 0-553-23642-3
- Secrets of Fijian Medicine, San Rafael, Calif.: Quantum Books, 1983, ISBN 0-912845-02-3
- Vital Signs, San Diego: Avant Books, 1983, ISBN 0-932238-20-3
- Dr. Savage's High Fiber Counter, New York: Pinnacle Books, 1984, ISBN 0-523-42211-3
- Getting Off Cocaine, New York: Avon Publications, 1984, ISBN 0-380-67900-0
- The People's Herbal: A Family Guide to Herbal Home Remedies, Los Angeles: Putnam Publishing Group, 1984, ISBN 0-399-50756-6
- Maximum Immunity: How to Fortify Your Natural Defenses Against Cancer, AIDS, Arthritis, Allergies – Even the Common Cold – And Free Yourself from Unnecessary Worry for Life, Boston: Houghton Mifflin Harcourt, 1986, ISBN 0-395-37910-5
- Reducing the Risk of Alzheimer's, New York: Stein and Day Publishers, 1987, republished under the name Michael Savage, Ph.D., 2007, ISBN 0-946551-53-7
- The Complete Book of Homeopathy: The Holistic & Natural Way to Good Health, Garden City Park, N.Y.: Avery Publishing, 1989, ISBN 0-89529-412-5
- The Herbal Bible: A Family Guide to Herbal Home Remedies, San Rafael, Calif.: Quantum Books, 1992, ISBN 0-912845-06-6
- Healing Children Naturally, San Rafael, Calif.: Quantum Books, 1993, republished under the name Michael Savage, Ph.D., 2007, ISBN 0-912845-10-4
- Herbs That Heal: Prescription for Herbal Healing, Mill Valley, Calif.: Quantum Books, 1994, ISBN 0-912845-11-2
- The Antioxidant Cookbook: A Nutritionist's Secret Strategy for Delicious and Healthy Eating, Mill Valley, Calif.: Quantum Books, 1995, ISBN 0-912845-13-9

=== Literature as Michael Savage ===
- The Death of the White Male: The Case Against Affirmative Action, Mill Valley, Calif.: Quantum Books, 1991, ISBN 0-912845-08-2
- The Compassionate Conservative Speaks, San Rafael, Calif.: Quantum Books, 1995, ISBN 0-912845-13-9
- The Savage Nation: Saving America from the Liberal Assault on Our Borders, Language, and Culture, Nashville, Tenn: WND Books, 2002, ISBN 0-7852-6353-5
- The Enemy Within: Saving America from the Liberal Assault on Our Churches, Schools, and Military, Nashville, Tenn: Nelson Current, 2003, ISBN 0-7852-6102-8
- Liberalism Is a Mental Disorder: Savage Solutions, Nashville, Tenn: Nelson Current, 2005, ISBN 1-59555-006-2
- The Political Zoo, Nashville, Tenn: Nelson Current, 2006, ISBN 1-59555-042-9
- Psychological Nudity: Savage Radio Stories, San Francisco: Savage Productions, 2008, ISBN 1-4276-3401-7
- Banned in Britain: Beating the Liberal Blacklist, New York: Plume, 2009, ISBN 978-1-4276-4253-0
- Trickle Up Poverty: Stopping Obama's Attack on Our Borders, Economy, and Security, New York: William Morrow and Company, 2010, ISBN 978-0-06-201097-1
- Abuse of Power, New York: St. Martin's Press, 2011, ISBN 978-0-312-65161-9
- Trickle Down Tyranny, New York: William Morrow and Company, April 3, 2012, ISBN 978-0-06-208397-5
- Train Tracks: Family Stories of the Holidays, New York: HarperCollins, 2012, ISBN 978-0-06-221084-5
- A Time for War, New York: St. Martin's Press, 2013, ISBN 978-0-312-65162-6
- Stop the Coming Civil War: My Savage Truth, Center Street, 2014, ISBN 1-4555-8243-3
- Countdown to Mecca, St. Martin's Press, 2015, ISBN 978-1-250-03526-4 (hardcover)
- Government Zero: No Borders, No Language, No Culture, Hachette Book Group, Inc., 2015, ISBN 978-1-4555-3611-5 (hardcover)
- Diseases without Borders: Boosting Your Immunity Against Infectious Diseases from the Flu and Measles to Tuberculosis, Center StreetPublication., 2016, ISBN 978-1-4555-3663-4 (E-Book)
- Teddy and Me: Confessions of a Service Human, Center Street, 2016, ISBN 978-1-4555-3612-2
- Scorched Earth: Restoring the Country after Obama, Center Street, 2016, ISBN 978-1-4555-6824-6
- Trump's War: His Battle for America, Center Street, 2017, ISBN 978-1-4789-7667-7
- God, Faith, and Reason, Center Street, 2017, ISBN 978-1-4789-7671-4
- Xenon, Utopia Productions, 2018, ASIN B079MGKJD1
- Stop Mass Hysteria: America's Insanity from the Salem Witch Trials to the Trump Witch Hunt, from the Red Scare to Russian Collusion, Center Street, 2018, ASIN B076ZB5DG1
- A Savage Life, HarperCollins, 2019, ISBN 978-0-0629-3639-4
- Our Fight for America – The War Continues" Hachette Book Group, 2020, ISBN 978-1-5460-5949-3
