= Talk Radio Network =

Former American radio syndicator

- Company type: Private
- Industry: Entertainment
- Founded: 1993
- Headquarters: Central Point, Oregon, US
- Key people: Mark Masters, CEO
- Services: Radio Syndication, Production
- Website: www.talkradionetwork.com

Talk Radio Network (TRN) was an independent radio producer and syndicator of news and talk radio programming headquartered in Central Point, Oregon. TRN consists of a number of associated companies, which have launched or re-built some of the United States' highest-ranked talk radio shows, including The Savage Nation, Coast to Coast AM, and The Jerry Doyle Show. TRN was founded in 1993 and managed by CEO Mark Masters and his brother, David Masters, who was senior executive producer from 1999 thru 2017.

In 2007, Bear Stearns reported that TRN was the second-largest provider of nationally syndicated radio talk shows in the country, ahead of competitors ABC Radio and then-CBS-controlled Westwood One. The company thereafter went into decline amid contract disputes with its most successful talents and an ongoing feud with its satellite provider.

In December 2017, affiliate radio stations reported that Talk Radio Network's programming feed had ceased without notice.

== History ==
Talk Radio Network originated from Advice Line, a syndicated program hosted by Roy Masters. TRN was established and operated by Masters's sons and carried Advice Line throughout its existence.

Among the network's earliest offerings was Art Bell's Coast to Coast AM produced by David Masters from 1994 through 1998 which had reached record station affiliates of over 500 during that time. In 1998, the original Talk Radio Network Inc. company and all of its programs was acquired by Premiere Radio Networks for the syndication rights of Coast to Coast AM. At that time, TRN's programs were broadcast nationally by more than 300 radio stations.

Actor Jerry Doyle was introduced to TRN by Mancow Muller, who at the time hosted The Mancow Experience on TRN. Before starting his own show, Doyle was invited to guest-host for Rusty Humphries' TRN-syndicated Saturday Night America, which was broadcast to over two hundred stations. Based on the broadcast, TRN offered Doyle a regular show that became The Jerry Doyle Show. Doyle hosted the show for TRN until his sudden death in 2016. TRN has been responsible for syndicating and producing other notable talk radio programs including The Sam Sorbo Show, Science Fantastic with Michio Kaku, The Laura Ingraham Show (from 2004 to 2012), The Andrea Tantaros Show, Monica Crowley, and The Phil Hendrie Show.

In June 2009, TRN partnered with The Washington Times to debut America's Morning News (AMN) with a focus on investigative reporting and live news and commentary from Washington, D.C. At its launch, AMN was hosted by Melanie Morgan and John McCaslin.

TRN rolled out America's Radio News Network (ARNN) in January 2011 as an all news network service for stations, which ran for 15 hours every weekday. TRN (permanently) suspended ARNN operations on September 6, 2013.

TRN effectively ceased regular operations on December 22, 2017 when its programming stopped being delivered via satellite to radio stations. Advice Line later moved to Radio America.

=== Contract disputes ===
==== Michael Savage ====
TRN syndicated The Michael Savage Show from 1999 until 2012. In 2006, Michael Savage was accused of Islamophobia based on comments he made on-air. Mark Masters defended Savage's free speech rights and said, "CAIR threw the kitchen sink at us with the goal of getting Savage fired, but we weren't intimidated. His audience supports him and so do his sponsors who have renewed... [Savage is] just a guy with an opinion venting his heartfelt feelings to his audience, and they support him."

In 2010, a dispute arose when TRN attempted to exercise a "right to match" provision in Savage's contract at the end of its term. Savage argued against going into arbitration with TRN but was shot down. The American Arbitration Association (AAA) awarded Savage more than $1 million, ruling in his favor, and allowing him to sign with Cumulus Media Networks. TRN told the Ninth Circuit Court of Appeals that, through ex parte letters, Savage had threatened the AAA with a negative public relations campaign during proceedings, which interfered with the arbitrator's decision-making. The Ninth Circuit refused to allow the evidence. The Supreme Court later denied TRN's request for writ of certiorari in 2016.

==== Laura Ingraham ====
The Laura Ingraham Show moved from Westwood One to Talk Radio Network in 2004. In June 2008, Ingraham walked away from the program in a contract dispute. She eventually returned to the show a month later.

Immediately after Savage won his case against the network, Ingraham's contract also expired; in addition to leaving the network, she also won rights to her entire show's archive from TRN. Ingraham joined Norman Pattiz's Courtside Entertainment Group in January 2013.

==== Phil Hendrie ====
In June 2013, shortly after both Savage and Ingraham left TRN, Phil Hendrie terminated his relationship with the network in a mutual decision. After years of rebuilding Hendrie's affiliate base, it abruptly switched the affiliates to Roy Masters's Advice Line.

== Actions against Dial Global and Cumulus Media ==
In August 2011, TRN, representing the three largest privately held syndicators, filed an antitrust lawsuit against Dial Global after it merged with Westwood One. TRN also said that "Dial Global/Westwood One has been collecting our advertising revenues, but refusing to pay them over to us or to account for them." In 2013, Cumulus Media acquired Dial Global (renamed Westwood One) for $260 million, to which TRN publicly opposed. Shortly after, TRN scaled back its operations resulting in the sudden suspension of America's Radio News Network. In March 2014, TRN and Cumulus Media announced a settlement of TRN's lawsuit over claims of unpaid advertising revenues and unfair competition against Dial Global. Regarding the settlement, Cumulus Media President/CEO Lew Dickey said, "While Cumulus Media had no role in the lawsuits filed by TRN Companies, we are pleased to resolve these claims and move forward together."

In April 2016, TRN launched a new federal antitrust lawsuit against Cumulus Media, Westwood One, Compass Media Networks, Ron Hartenbaum's WYD Media Management & WYM Media Management, former Cumulus Media CEO Lew Dickey and Westwood One COO Charles Steinhauer. TRN said in its lawsuit that Westwood One uses its monopoly power to conceal and misrepresent its accounting of advertising revenue allocations and advantage its own programming at the expense of programs of independent radio syndicators.

The lawsuit was dismissed on September 11, 2016, but TRN immediately appealed the decision. While Cumulus Media sorted through its bankruptcy, an automatic stay of the TRN appeal was in effect. Upon Cumulus Media's exit from bankruptcy on June 4, 2018, TRN asked the bankruptcy judge to terminate the automatic stay and allow it to proceed with its appeal. On July 3, 2018, the New York-based court cancelled the stay, allowing TRN's appeal to proceed. In a two-page filing on August 10, 2018, TRN made a plaintiff’s motion for “voluntary dismissal.” It stated, “Plaintiffs hereby respectfully move to dismiss the appeal in this matter with prejudice, with an order that each party bear its own costs and attorney’s fees.” And added, “Defendants have authorized us to represent that they consent to this Motion.” The court record reflects the dismissal with prejudice on August 23, 2018. Meanwhile, TRN ceased operations in December 2017.
