= The Savage Nation =

- Genre: Conservative talk
- Country of origin: United States
- Language: English
- Home station: KSFO (1995 – May 30, 2003); KSTE (June 2, 2003 – June 27, 2003); KNEW (July 1, 2003 – September 11, 2009); KSTE (September 14, 2009 – January 29, 2010); KTRB (February 1, 2010 – September 10, 2010); KSTE (September 13, 2010 – September 27, 2012); KSFO (October 23, 2012 – December 31, 2020)
- Syndicates: Talk Radio Network (1999–2012); Cumulus Media and Westwood One (2012–2020)
- TV adaptations: The Savage Nation (MSNBC, 2003)
- Hosted by: Michael Savage
- Recording studio: San Francisco, California
- Original release: January 2, 1995 (local); 1999 (national) – December 31, 2020 (local and national)
- Opening theme: "Master of Puppets" "Live Wire"
- Website: michaelsavage.com

The Savage Nation (also called The Michael Savage Show) was an American conservative talk radio show hosted by Michael Savage. The program was heard by approximately 11 million listeners a week, which made it the 7th most listened to radio show in the country.

The show was based in San Francisco, California, and was syndicated through Cumulus Media and Westwood One.

== Program summary ==
=== 1994–1998 ===
In 1994, Michael Savage (then publishing under his birth name Michael Weiner) submitted for publication a manuscript called Immigrants and Epidemics. The proposed book, which was about the influx of foreign diseases due to the wave of illegal immigrants, was promptly rejected for what Savage contends was its politically incorrect subject matter. This, along with the suggestions of friends and acquaintances, inspired Savage to record a radio demo about the very subject of his manuscript. He mailed the tape to 250 radio stations, and on March 21, 1994, The Savage Nation was born on KGO in San Francisco.

Savage's radio career began modestly enough as a fill-in host for Ray Taliaferro. On January 2, 1995, Savage began hosting The Savage Nation on KGO's new sister station KSFO, which at the time changed its lineup to be completely conservative.

=== 1999–2003 ===
In 1999, Savage began hosting separate local and national parts of The Savage Nation. On September 21, 2000, Savage made the entire Savage Nation show nationally syndicated through Talk Radio Network. After one year, he was in 150 markets. By 2003, he was in more than 200 markets. Savage's fill-in guest hosts include former U.S. congressman "B-1" Bob Dornan, Rick Roberts, Mancow, and Peter Weisbach. Talk radio host Lars Larson is also a former guest host, although his show now directly competes with The Savage Nation..

=== 2003–2012 ===
In June 2003, he had a salary dispute with his flagship station KSFO, which refused to renegotiate his contract, and KSFO dropped his show on June 2. In July 2003, he began his show on rival station KNEW.

As of 2009, Savage had 8-10 million listeners per week, making his show the third most widely heard broadcast in the United States.

The Savage Nation was removed from KNEW's schedule on September 10, 2009, as the station had "decided to go in a different philosophical and ideological direction [sic]." It was later picked up by sports station KTRB, but that agreement ended when Comerica Bank foreclosed on the station. Savage advised listeners that the show can be heard in the Bay Area via Sacramento-area KSTE.

Savage filed a lawsuit in an attempt to break from his contract, which, though it expired at the end of 2010, contained clauses that granted Talk Radio Network the right to match any offer in perpetuity. Savage won the lawsuit the morning of September 27, 2012, leading to the immediate cancellation of the show and forcing Talk Radio Network to hire a replacement in short order. Savage also won the rights to his entire archive but also was required to agree to a four-week non-compete clause, which prevented The Savage Nation from being picked up by another network in that time frame.

The Savage Nation was revived on Cumulus Media on October 23, 2012, the day the non-compete clause expired. It aired in a new time slot, 9:00 PM to 12:00 midnight ET, replacing the weeknight edition of John Batchelor's news magazine.

=== 2013 ===
On September 25, 2013, Savage announced during his show that effective January 2014, he would air during the afternoon drive hours of 3 p.m to 6 p.m, ET, replacing Sean Hannity for Cumulus Media Networks.

==== Feud with Sean Hannity ====
Savage has been involved in a personal dispute with talk show host Sean Hannity, whose slot on Cumulus he replaced at the beginning of 2014. Savage said about Hannity: "My competitor doesn’t have the capacity to go beyond the Democrat–Republican talking points. That's all he's ever done. That's all he can do. He has no education. I'm just going to lay it on the line, I'm not going to mince words."

=== 2016 United States presidential election ===
Savage was widely credited with helping Donald Trump become President of the United States and is known as the "Godfather of Trumpamania".

=== End of terrestrial syndication ===
In January 2019, The Savage Nation was cut to two hours, only one of which is carried on terrestrial radio; the second hour is carried exclusively as a podcast. On September 30, 2020, Savage announced that Cumulus Media and Westwood One withdrew the terrestrial radio show from syndication after December 31, 2020, leaving only the podcast; he also stated he was under a gag order as to why the change was being made.

== Format ==
Each hour of the daily three-hour broadcast usually begins with a monologue by Savage. Being a political commentator by trade, he often discusses issues in American politics and society in general. Many times, this leads to a passionate diatribe by Savage, a staple of The Savage Nation. Savage often takes calls in the second segment to comment on what was discussed in the previous segment.

Guests have traditionally been a rare occurrence, but they have become more frequent since 2007. From 2009 until the end of the TRN run, the entire third hour of most shows was devoted to pre-taped interviews with guests.

=== Introduction and music ===
Music is an integral part of The Savage Nation. Savage often extends the role of music beyond bumper music to be as much the content of the show as what he's talking about. (For instance, there was a period of several days in 2006 when Savage played "Living on a Thin Line" by The Kinks concurrent with his discussions of America's internal vulnerabilities.)

He also played "God Save the Queen" by the Sex Pistols and "Living on a Thin Line", and agreed that "there's no England now" after being banned from the U.K. by British Home Secretary Jacqui Smith.

The signature musical introduction to The Savage Nation is the beginning of Metallica's "Master of Puppets", followed by an announcer saying, "Warning: The Michael Savage Show contains adult language, adult content, psychological nudity. Listener discretion is advised." For years, this was followed by Mötley Crüe's "Looks That Kill" and Metallica's "The Shortest Straw" to conclude the introduction; following the move from TRN to Cumulus in 2012, the opening was revamped, and Mötley Crüe's "Live Wire" replaced the latter two songs.

For bumper music, Savage has used "Motorbreath", "Eye of the Beholder", "Frayed Ends of Sanity", "Holier Than Thou", "Jump in the Fire", "To Live Is to Die", "Battery", "Blackened", "Sad but True", "Ain't My Bitch", "Fuel", "The Shortest Straw", and "Don't Tread on Me" by Metallica, as well as "Du Hast" and "Tier" by Rammstein, Nirvana, "Big Gun" by AC/DC, and "Killing in the Name" by Rage Against the Machine. As of 2015, Judas Priest's "You've Got Another Thing Comin'" has generally played at the 30-minute break.

While Savage has previously criticized pop culture on his program, he is a self-proclaimed rock music fan. On his July 19, 2006 show, Savage said he is a huge fan of the German group Rammstein, and that he often drives around at night blasting their music. When challenged by a caller to explain why he likes Rammstein, Savage said they are "the only true form of poetry and music that reflect the real world nowadays." Savage played their music at length during that specific broadcast.

He is also a fan of 1950s rock 'n' roll and doo-wop music such as The Cadillacs, Frankie Lymon and the Teenagers, and The Flamingos, which was played on his "Rock and Roll Friday". On January 25, 2007, he started playing "I'm Broken" by Pantera on his show, stating that this is the type of music that U.S. troops should be listening to in Iraq.

On Mondays, he frequently opened the program by playing "Blue Monday" by Fats Domino.

=== Closing ===
Savage often closed the show by saying, "With God's will and your listenership, I shall return", or some variation thereof.

== Criticism and controversies ==
=== Controversial comments ===
Liberal advocacy groups and media watchdogs such as GLAAD and FAIR accuse Savage of racism, homophobia, bigotry, and Islamophobia because of his controversial statements about homosexuality, Islam, feminism, sex education, and immigration.

On his September 21, 1999 broadcast, Savage said that the motivation for female students who come from a Marin County private school to feed and provide services to the homeless is so they "can go in and get raped by them, because they seem to like the excitement of it..."

In 2007, Supertalk Mississippi removed The Savage Nation from its programming due to negative reaction by listeners.

In November 2016, Savage commented on why he avoided paranormal topics: "You say ‘UFOs,’ you wind up in the Philippines with a 10-year-old hooker and you are off the radio after a number of years." The in-joke was a reference to Art Bell, who was known for his frequent disappearances from radio during his lifetime and, at age 60 and almost immediately after the death of his previous wife, married a then-22-year old Filipino woman named Airyn Ruiz in 2006; Bell and Ruiz sued Savage and Westwood One shortly thereafter for defamation, with Ruiz insisting she was not a prostitute nor a child bride. The lawsuit was settled on February 27, 2017.

==== Islamophobia ====
On April 17, 2006, he commented about Muslims,

They say, 'Oh, there's a billion of them.' I said, 'So, kill 100 million of them, then there'll be 900 million of them.' I mean, would you rather die—would you rather us die than them?

Savage's comments were seriously criticized worldwide and following controversy over such comments allegedly soliciting murder and inciting racial hatred (both criminal offences in the United Kingdom), on May 5, 2009, then-Home Secretary Jacqui Smith announced that Savage was on a list of individuals banned from entering the United Kingdom as he is "considered to be engaging in unacceptable behaviour by seeking to provoke others to serious criminal acts and fostering hatred which might lead to inter-community violence."

Savage called on his listeners to support him by canceling travel and business in Britain, as well as by boycotting British-made goods, commenting, "If they want to play hardball, we'll play hardball."
