= KBUL-FM =

Country music radio station in Reno, Nevada

Coordinates: 39.259°N 119.703°W

- Carson City, Nevada; United States
- Broadcast area: Reno metropolitan area
- Frequency: 98.1 MHz (HD Radio)
- Branding: K Bull 98.1 FM

Programming
- Format: Country
- Subchannels: HD2: KKOH simulcast
- Affiliations: Westwood One

Ownership
- Owner: Cumulus Media; (Radio License Holding CBC, LLC)
- Sister stations: KKOH; KNEV; KWYL

History
- First air date: November 30, 1984 (as KNSS)
- Former call signs: KNSS (CP, 1984–1987); KBUL (1987–1996)
- Former frequencies: 97.9 MHz (CP, 1984)
- Call sign meaning: "Bull"

Technical information
- Licensing authority: FCC
- Facility ID: 11245
- Class: C
- ERP: 74,000 watts
- HAAT: 699 meters (2,293 ft)

Links
- Public license information: Public file; LMS
- Webcast: Listen live; Listen live; Listen live (via iHeartRadio)
- Website: www.kbul.com

KBUL-FM (98.1 MHz) is a commercial radio station licensed to Carson City, Nevada, and serving the Reno metropolitan area. KBUL-FM airs a country music radio format, known as "K-BULL", and is owned by Cumulus Media. Its studios and offices are located on Plumb Lane in South Reno.

The transmitter is located on McClellan Peak off Sunil Pandit Road, amid the towers for other Reno-area FM and TV stations. KBUL-FM has an effective radiated power (ERP) of 72,000 watts. Its signal covers West Central Nevada and the Lake Tahoe area of California.

== History ==
The station got its construction permit from the Federal Communications Commission (FCC) on November 30, 1984, using the call sign KNSS. The company receiving the permit was Carson City Broadcasters.

The station signed on as KBUL a couple of years later to avoid confusion with another radio station KNIS. The new call letters were chosen to identify it as "K-BULL", playing country music. The owner was Marathon Broadcasting, with Dave Graupner serving as general manager.

In 1992, the station was acquired by Citadel Broadcasting, which merged with Cumulus Media in 2011. On October 16, 2015 the K-Bull name was changed to Nash FM to match other Cumulus-owned country stations around the U.S. using the Nash branding and platform. It returned to using the K-Bull logo and name a few years later.
