= Islamist (disambiguation) =

An Islamist is a person who holds a set of political ideologies holding that Islam is not only a religion but also a political system.

Islamist may also refer to:

- The Islamist, a 2007 book by Ed Husain

== See also ==
- Islam (disambiguation)
