= Howard Bloom =

American author (born 1943)

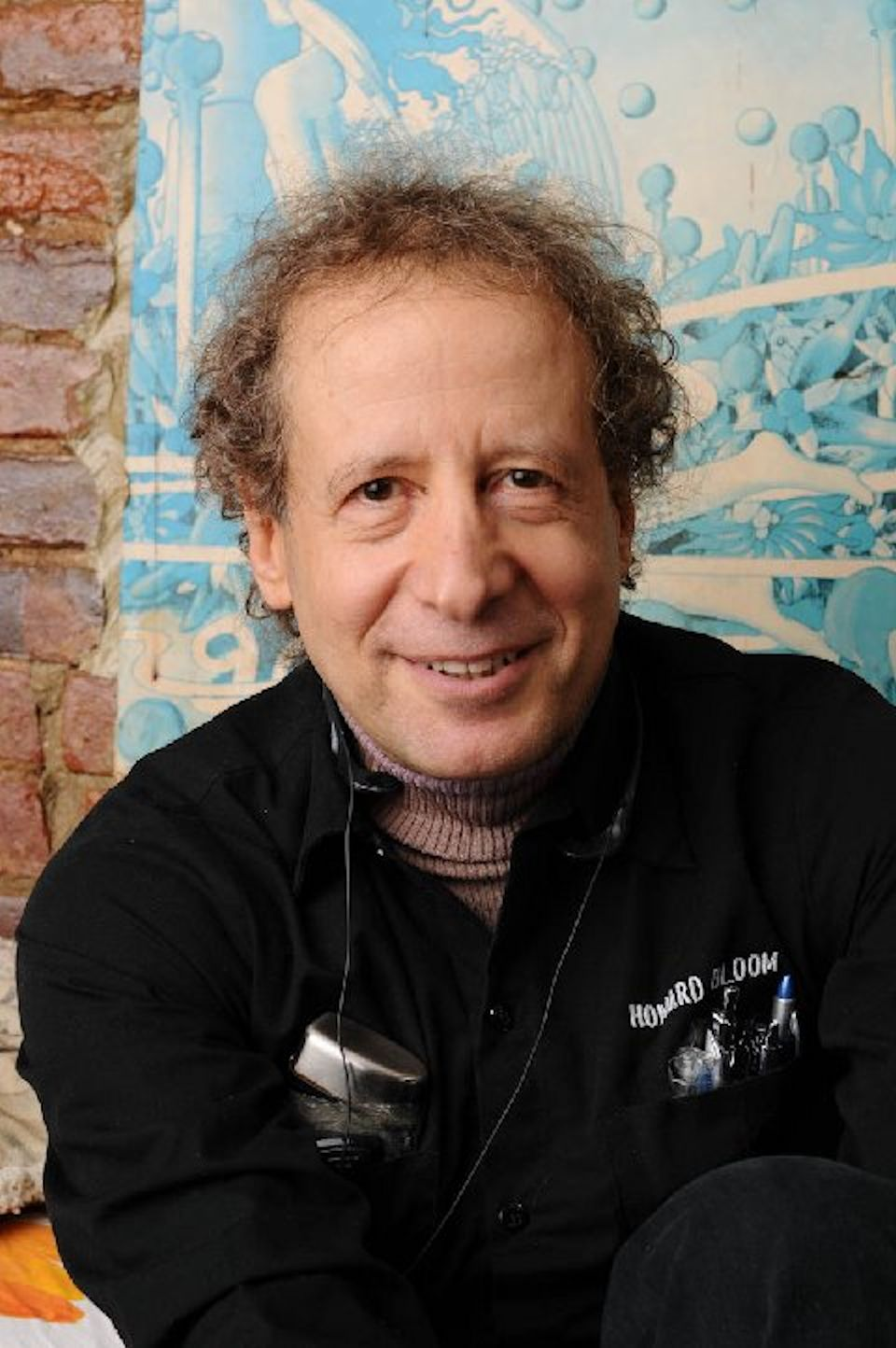
- Born: June 25, 1943 (age 83); Buffalo, New York, U.S.
- Education: New York University
- Occupation: Author
- Writing career
- Subjects: Sociology, evolutionary psychology
- Website: howardbloom.net

Howard Bloom (born June 25, 1943) is an American author. He was a music publicist in the 1970s and 1980s for singers and bands such as Prince, Billy Joel, and Styx. He has published a book on Islam, The Muhammad Code, an autobiography, How I Accidentally Started The Sixties, and three books on human evolution and group behavior: The Genius of the Beast, Global Brain, and The Lucifer Principle.

== Early life ==
Bloom was born to a Jewish family in Buffalo, New York. He became interested in science, especially cosmology and microbiology, as early as the age of ten. By age sixteen Bloom was working as an assistant researching the immune system at the Roswell Park Memorial Research Cancer Institute. Bloom graduated from New York University and, at the age of twenty-five, veered from his scientific studies to work as an editor for Circus, a rock magazine. Bloom would go on to found one of the largest public relations firms in the music industry.

== Career ==
=== Public relations ===
In 1974 Bloom was made the head of public relations of ABC Records. He also was briefly head of Gulf+Western's music publicity department. In 1976, he founded The Howard Bloom Organization. In 1980, Bloom suggested to Prince and his management that he "aggressively pursue the rock and new wave audience ... Consequently, Prince's management put together a series of performances designed with racially mixed audiences in mind". He tutored the band Styx in how to appeal to "more staid magazines" such as the Wall Street Journal and People and so make them mainstream. He was hired by Columbia Records to make Billy Joel "more media friendly".

Bloom was also a publicist for Michael Jackson, Cyndi Lauper, Talking Heads, Lionel Richie, ZZ Top, Bette Midler, AC/DC, Simon & Garfunkel, John Mellencamp, Earth, Wind & Fire, and Kiss. He handled Bob Marley during his Uprising Tour.

Bloom has been described in a biography of Billy Joel as "the public relations spinmeister to have on your payroll in the seventies and eighties if you were a musician and your image needed to be authenticated to the masses". With his company he had successfully transformed and launched the careers of many rock stars including John Mellencamp, Kiss, Hall and Oates, AC/DC, and Run DMC". He has also been described as "one of the most successful publicists of his generation, a star maker whose client list was a Who's Who of rock and roll ... [whose] ... interest in rock and roll had more to do with the study of mass psychology in action than furthering the aggrandizement of spoiled rock stars. He approached PR as an applied science".

In 1979, New York Magazine put him in the "Hot 100 plus" as one of its "Big Dealmakers" and observed, "His brain is a vinyl storage system: the most thorough and efficient". According to Derek Sutton, manager of the Styx, he was "probably the greatest press agent that rock and roll has ever known." In 1986, the Howard Bloom Organization was reported to be "one of the most successful independent public relations firms in the music business. [In 1985], his acts grossed $333 million."

=== Books ===
Bloom has written a number of books, including: The Genius of the Beast, Global Brain: The Evolution of Mass Mind from the Big Bang to the 21st Century, and The Lucifer Principle. His books discuss ideas ranging from human nature to what makes rock and roll artists successful. According to Bloom: "Everything from the wolf-pack behavior of music business executives to the lemming-like conduct of hypocritical journalists helped shape my insights" and that "[t]he real magic of rock happens at a concert, where if the performers are successful, individuals ... merge in a pulse of common emotion ... This consolidation mirrors the force that create much of both human good and evil". He founded the International Paleopsychology Project, an Internet group "to study the development of the universe from its conception to the present". Individuals crediting him with inspiration include the scientist Peter Corning and science fiction writer Greg Bear.

His fourth book, The God Problem: How A Godless Cosmos Creates, was issued August 24, 2012.

His memoir, How I Accidentally Started The Sixties, was published in 2017.

== Personal life ==
Bloom developed chronic fatigue syndrome in 1988, which left him housebound. The 2007 book Chronic Fatigue Syndrome For Dummies lists Bloom as one of the ten most famous people with CFS. In 2001, the New York City Clerk's Office refused to issue him a marriage license in his home, though marriage licenses can be arranged for those unable to attend its office, for those confined to hospitals, nursing homes and prisons. After this decision was publicized, a personal visit was made by the city clerk to Bloom's house to issue the license. The New York Times observed that regulations in regard to obtaining licenses at the city clerk's office were likely in breach of the Americans with Disabilities Act of 1990.

Bloom considers himself a non-militant yet "stone-cold atheist" and lives in Brooklyn, New York. In 1986, Bloom joined with Bob Guccione, Jr., Ted Nugent, John Waite and Sheena Easton to form Music in Action, an organization protesting the censorship against rock music being advocated for at the time by religious fundamentalists such as Jimmy Swaggart.

An article by Bloom published in Omni magazine, "The importance of hugging", suggested that "Islamic cultures treat their children harshly, they despise open displays of affection ... the result is violent adults", and as a consequence, "An entire people may have turned barbaric for the simple lack of a hug." This claim led the American-Arab Anti-Discrimination Committee to organize a sit-in at Omni's New York head office. His article has been described as "not unlike some forms of religious anti-Semitism", and together with similar comments in his book The Lucifer Principle, "an example of Orientalist (and racist) literature". Bloom has written that "Arab pressure groups asked ever so politely ... that nothing that I write be published again. They offered to boycott my publisher's products — all of them — worldwide. And they backed their warning with a call for my punishment in seventeen Islamic countries."

== Books ==
- Bloom, Howard K. (2020). Einstein, Michael Jackson & Me. Backbeat Books. ISBN 978-1493051670.
- Bloom, Howard K. (2017). How I Accidentally Started The Sixties. Rare Bird Books. ISBN 978-1945572913.
- Bloom, Howard K. (2016). The Muhammad Code: How a Desert Prophet Brought You ISIS, al Qaeda, and Boko Haram. Port Townsend, Wash.: Feral House. ISBN 978-1627310369. OCLC 965732548.
- Bloom, Howard K. (2012). The God Problem: How a Godless Cosmos Creates. Amherst, N.Y.: Prometheus Books. ISBN 9781616145514. OCLC 764387290.
- Bloom, Howard K. (2010). The Genius of the Beast : A Radical Re-vision of Capitalism. Amherst, NY: Prometheus Books. ISBN 978-1-59102-754-6. OCLC 318873448.
- Bloom, Howard K. (2000). The Global Brain: The Evolution of Mass Mind from the Big Bang to the 21st Century. New York, N.Y.: Wiley. ISBN 978-0-471-29584-6. OCLC 43207426.
- Bloom, Howard K. (1995). The Lucifer Principle : A Scientific Expedition into the Forces of History. New York, N.Y.: The Atlantic Monthly Press. ISBN 978-0-87113-532-2. OCLC 30436518.
