= The Lucifer Principle =

1995 book by Howard Bloom

The Lucifer Principle: A Scientific Expedition into the Forces of History
- Author: Howard Bloom
- Subjects: Sociology, Evolution
- Publisher: Atlantic Monthly Press
- Publication date: January 1995
- Media type: Print (Paperback)
- Pages: 466 (Paperback)
- ISBN: 978-0-87113-532-2

The Lucifer Principle is a 1995 book by American author Howard Bloom, in which he argues that social groups, not individuals, are the primary "unit of selection" on genes and human psychological development. He states that both competition between groups and competition between individuals shape the evolution of the genome. Bloom "explores the intricate relationships among genetics, human behavior, and culture" and argues that "evil is a by-product of nature's strategies for creation and that it is woven into our most basic biological fabric". It sees selection (e.g., through violent competition) as central to the creation of the "superorganism" of society. It also focuses on competition between individuals for position in the "pecking order" and competition between groups for standing in pecking orders of groups. The Lucifer Principle shows how ideas are vital in creating cohesion and cooperation in these pecking order battles. In the book, Bloom writes: "Superorganism, ideas and the pecking order...these are the primary forces behind much of human creativity and earthly good."

== Reception of the book ==
Reviews of the book saw it as "ambitious" and "disturbing" in its conclusions that societies based on individual freedom might succumb to systems such as bureaucratic Communism or Islamic fundamentalism. The Washington Post said that "Readers will be mesmerized by the mirror Bloom holds to the human condition... He draws on a dozen years of research into a jungle of scholarly fields...and meticulously supports every bit of information...." while Chet Raymo in The Boston Globe termed it "a string of rhetorical firecrackers that challenge our many forms of self-righteousness".

== Bloom responds to Islamic issues ==
Bloom later wrote that he and his publisher had been threatened by Islamic groups who objected to aspects of the book. He claimed that "Arab pressure groups asked ever so politely that The Lucifer Principle be withdrawn from print and that nothing that I write be published again. They offered to boycott my publisher's products—all of them—worldwide. And they backed their warning with a call for my punishment in seventeen Islamic countries." Bloom states that the attorney for the Authors Guild wrote to his publishers, warning of an author boycott if the book was pulled from the shelves. The publishers asked Bloom to rewrite a chapter on Islamic violence, which led to the creation of 358 lines of footnotes attesting to the facts he presented within it, documenting that what Bloom wrote about Islam in The Lucifer Principle is based on expertise.
