= The Savage Nation (book) =

2003 book by Michael Savage

The Savage nation : saving America from the liberal assault on our borders, language, and culture
- Author: Michael Savage
- Language: English
- Genre: Current affairs
- Publisher: WND Books
- Publication date: 2002
- Publication place: United States
- Media type: Book
- Pages: 220
- ISBN: 0-7852-6353-5
- OCLC: 50622305
- Dewey Decimal: 306/.0973
- LC Class: JC574.2.U6 S28 2002

The Savage Nation: Saving America from the Liberal Assault on Our Borders, Language, and Culture is Michael Savage's 18th book. It was published in 2003 and spent 18 weeks on the NY Times best seller list, debuting at #4. It provides conservative social commentary and criticism of liberals, and Democrats.
