= Paranormal radio shows =

Radio programs focusing on paranormal subjects

Paranormal radio shows are programs focusing on paranormal subjects such as unidentified flying objects, alien abduction, possession (by either demonic or spiritual forces), conspiracy theories, ghosts and cryptozoology. They are broadcast via shortwave, AM and FM radio stations or via internet streaming, often as late night shows.

Depending on the type of programming format, many of these shows feature paranormal discussion between the hosts, include listener participation and also special guest appearances from psychics and other prominent figures in the paranormal community. Such shows frequently feature reports from people on location at supposedly haunted locations, helping listeners feel like they are there.

== History ==
In 1929 Joseph Dunninger hosted the "Ghost Hour" on NBC radio. During the show Dunninger projected mental images to listeners, asking them to write in with their results. The show was an attempt to harness the perceived paranormal properties of radio waves (see also the contemporary experimental television series The Television Ghost, which followed a similar conceit). The pioneer of paranormal radio was Long John Nebel who, from the 1950s until his death in 1978, hosted late night shows dealing with the supernatural.

In 1988 Art Bell launched the late night talk show Coast to Coast AM (formerly West Coast AM, broadcast on KDWN from 1978) which regularly deals with paranormal topics. The popularity of Bell's show caused a rise in similar programs across the US during the 1990s.

Early paranormal radio shows focused on recounting local ghost stories. However, with the rise of such concepts as reality television and internet radio, modern paranormal radio tends to focus on paranormal investigators and their research.

Currently, it is easy for paranormal enthusiasts to host their own web-based radio shows; as a result, such shows have proliferated. The quality and content of web based shows varies dramatically, but most are focused on the local paranormal scene wherever they happen to be based.
