= Talkers Magazine =

American talk radio publication

- Talkers magazine cover, showing Randi Rhodes, Dec. 2005/Jan. 2006 issue
- Frequency: 10 per year
- Publisher: Michael Harrison
- Founder: Michael Harrison
- Founded: 1990
- Company: Talk Media Inc.
- Country: United States
- Based in: Longmeadow, Massachusetts
- Language: English
- Website: www.talkers.com
- OCLC: 1113466086

Talkers Magazine is a trade-industry publication related to talk radio in the United States. Its slogan is "The Bible of Talk Radio and the New Talk Media". In addition to radio, it also covers talk shows on broadcast and cable television, as well as Internet-only shows and podcasting.

== History ==
Talkers was launched in summer 1990 by current publisher Michael Harrison. It publishes 10 issues per year from Longmeadow, Massachusetts. The magazine is owned by Talk Media, Inc.

Twice a year, Talkers publishes an estimate of the audience size for most-listened-to radio talk shows, based partially on Nielsen ratings but with substantial non-scientific and opinion-based alteration (and corresponding bias) from the Talkers editorial board.

The magazine also publishes a yearly "Heavy Hundred," a completely subjective power ranking of the nation's talk radio hosts. Beginning in 2006, it published the "Talkers 250" to expound on the "Heavy Hundred", listing #101 to #250, though in alphabetical order by genre instead of order of importance. In 2002, it published a list of the top 25 radio and television talk shows each of all time. In 2009, it published the Frontier Fifty, listing in alphabetical order a "Selection of Outstanding Talk Media Webcasters."

Talkers also compiles the weekly "Talkers Ten," a countdown of the most popular topics on talk radio in a given week. The countdown has typically been broadcast on Doug Stephan's program.

== Online ==
The magazine's online version is TALKERS.com, which provides free access to all content from the print version. Talkers also produces its own original podcasts via their sister site, PodJockey.com.

Talkers acquired RadioInfo.com, a radio news and information site previously owned and operated by the estate of Doug Fleming, in August 2012. That site's message boards would continue to be held by the Fleming estate.
