= Mass media in Fort Wayne, Indiana =

Following is the complete list of mainstream and commercial media serving Fort Wayne, Indiana and its immediate suburbs.

== Media ==
=== Newspapers ===
Commercial newspapers
Frequency	Name	Format	Coverage	Circulation	Owner
Daily	The Journal Gazette	morning broadsheet	regional	73,058 (126,988 Sunday)	Journal Gazette Company
Weekly	Greater Fort Wayne Business Weekly	Paid tabloid	regional business		Fort Wayne Newspapers
Weekly	The Aboite News	Paid tabloid	Community/Regional News		KPC Media Group, Inc.
Weekly	The Dupont Valley News	Paid tabloid	Community/Regional News		KPC Media Group, Inc.
Weekly	The New Haven News	Paid tabloid	Community/Regional News		KPC Media Group, Inc.
Weekly	The Northwest News	Paid tabloid	Community/Regional News		Fort Wayne Newspapers
Weekly	The Leo-Cedarville News	Paid tabloid	Community/Regional News		KPC Media Group, Inc.
Weekly	whatzup	free tabloid alternative weekly	regional entertainment		Sweetwater Sound, Inc.
Weekly	Fort Wayne Ink Spot	tabloid alternative bi-weekly	African American regional		Fort Wayne Ink Spot LLC
Monthly	Waynedale News	free broadsheet	Waynedale	12,000	Waynedaler, LLC
Monthly	Macedonian Tribune	tabloid	national (Macedonian)		Macedonian Patriotic Organization
Monthly	El Mexicano Newspaper	tabloid	regional (Spanish)		El Mexicano Newspaper LLC

=== Television ===
Fort Wayne is the 107th-largest television market in the United States according to Nielsen Media Research.

- 12 WINM Angola (TCT)**
- 15 WANE-TV Fort Wayne (CBS)
- 21 WPTA Fort Wayne (ABC, NBC on 21.2, Independent with MyNetworkTV on 21.3)
- 33 WISE Fort Wayne (The CW)
- 39 WFWA Fort Wayne (PBS)
- 45 WFWC-CD Fort Wayne
- 55 WFFT Fort Wayne (Fox)
- Access Fort Wayne
- CATV5 via Purdue University Fort Wayne

=== Radio ===
The Fort Wayne radio market is the 107th-largest in the United States according to Arbitron. It includes radio stations licensed to Fort Wayne and its surrounding communities in Indiana and Ohio.

=== AM ===
- 860 WMRI Marion (Silent)
- 1090 WFCV Fort Wayne (Bott Radio Network)
- 1190 WOWO Fort Wayne (Talk radio)
- 1250 WGL Fort Wayne (All-news radio)
- 1300 WBZQ Huntington (Soft adult contemporary)
- 1380 WKJG Fort Wayne (Sports)
- 1450 WIOE Fort Wayne (Oldies)
- 1570 WGLL Auburn (3ABN Radio)

=== FM ===
- 88.3 WLAB Fort Wayne (Contemporary Christian)
- 89.1 WBOI Fort Wayne (Public radio/NPR/jazz)
- 90.3 WBCL Fort Wayne (Contemporary Christian)
- 91.1 WCYT Lafayette Township (Campus/alternative/indie/Homestead High School)
- 91.3 WCKZ Orland (Contemporary Christian-WLAB simulcast)
- 91.5 WJHS Columbia City (AAA/Columbia City High School)
- 91.9 WVSH Huntington (Campus/variety/Huntington North High School)
- 92.3 WFWI Fort Wayne (Talk radio-WOWO simulcast)
- 92.7 WZBD Berne (Adult contemporary)
- 93.3 WBTU Kendallville (Country)
- 94.1 WRNP Roanoke (Urban gospel/Taylor University)
- 95.1 WAJI Fort Wayne (Adult contemporary)
- 96.3 WXKE Churubusco (Classic rock)
- 97.3 WMEE Fort Wayne (Hot adult contemporary)
- 98.1 WDFM Defiance, OH (Hot adult contemporary)
- 98.9 WBYR Woodburn (Active rock)
- 100.1 WFCV-FM Bluffton (Bott Radio Network)
- 100.5 WQSW-LP Fort Wayne (Gospel)
- 101.1 WIOE-FM South Whitley (Oldies-WIOE simulcast)
- 101.7 WLDE Fort Wayne (Classic hits)
- 102.3 WGBJ Auburn (Alternative rock)
- 102.9 WJCI Huntington (Calvary Radio Network)
- 103.9 WWFW Fort Wayne (Soft adult contemporary)
- 105.1 WQHK-FM Huntertown (Country)
- 106.3 WRDF Columbia City (Relevant Radio)
- 106.7 WFGA Hicksville, OH (Classic country)
- 106.9 WXXC Marion (Classic hits)
- 107.9 WJFX New Haven (Contemporary hit radio)
