= 2014 in radio =

The following is a list of events affecting radio broadcasting in 2014. Events listed include radio program debuts, finales, cancellations, and station launches, closures and format changes, as well as information about controversies.

== Notable events ==
=== January ===
Date	Event
1	Two rimshot Phoenix adult top 40s, KEXX (at 103.9) and KMVA (at 97.5), merged into one simulcast covering the metropolitan area as "Hot 97.5/103.9 Trending Radio". The move brings KMVA's owner Trumper Radio into KEXX's owner Riviera Broadcast Group's Phoenix properties as part of the arrangement.
1	ESPN Radio gains a new affiliate in Columbia, South Carolina, after a long absence, as talk WOIC joins the sports network, whose first day featured the live broadcast of the South Carolina Gamecocks taking on the Wisconsin Badgers in the Capital One Bowl.
1	Waco, Texas, sister stations KWBT and KBCT make frequency, signal and format adjustments, with KWBT moving its R&B/hip-hop format from 104.9 to 94.5 and KBCT dropping its talk format and switching from 94.5 to 104.9, where it relaunched as rhythmic top 40 KBHT "Hot 104.9"
1	ESPN Radio also returns to New Orleans after being dropped in September 2013 by WWWL, as Cajun/swamp music outlet KLRZ becomes the new affiliate.
1	CFJL-FM/Winnipeg shifts from adult standards to AC and rebrands as "Jewel 101," putting it in line with Evanov Communications' AC formatted "Jewel" branding.
1	In the Greensboro/Winston-Salem/High Point area, active rock WVBZ (100.3 The Buzz) and top 40/CHR WMKS (105.7 Now) swapped signals, with WMKS relaunching as "100.3 KISS-FM" and WVBZ moving to 105.7 and shifting to alternative, bringing that format back to the area after 13 years.
1	WLFM-LP/Cleveland drops adult album alternative for Spanish top 40 under new a leasing deal with TSJ Media; Murray Hill Broadcasting will remain WLFM's primary owners.
1	WQQR/Paducah, Kentucky, brings the AC format back to the market after a two-year absence as "94.7 The Mix."
1	WGHQ/Kingston, New York, drops news/talk and becomes a non-commercial affiliate of NPR under new owners Robin Hood Radio.
1	Clear Channel's liberal talk outlets KTLK/Los Angeles and KNEW/San Francisco both shift to conservative talk and adopts "The Patriot" branding. KTLK also changes call letters to KEIB and transfers the former calls to sister station KTCN/Minneapolis-St. Paul
1	In a surprise move, WABC/New York City poaches Curtis Sliwa from WNYM/Hackensack and reunites him with his former WABC morning show co-host Ron Kuby. The revived Curtis and Kuby will air in the time slot formerly held by The Rush Limbaugh Show, which had left WABC for WOR the week prior.
3	Cumulus Media expands its Chicago properties, taking over operations of Merlin Media's WIQI (rhythmic AC) and WLUP-FM (classic rock) through a local marketing agreement as well as inheriting Merlin's LMA for WKQX-LP (alternative rock); the deal essentially ends Merlin's 3-year run as a broadcasting entity (WIQI and WLUP, along with New York's WRXP, were the company's first station purchases in 2011).
3	After three years with modern rock, WRKN/New Orleans began stunting with a wheel of formats. On January 6, it became the latest outlet to adopt the "Nash FM" country format.
6	WXDJ/Miami shifts from simulcasting Tropical/Salsa sister WRMA to Spanish hot AC as "I95."
6	Clear Channel Media and Entertainment and SFX Entertainment announced plans to expand SFX's Electronic Dance Music-owned properties, including its recently acquired Beatport online music portal, to Clear Channel's radio outlets and iHeartRadio platforms.
6	Another Phoenix outlet makes a major change as adult hits KPKX flipped to a simulcast of sports talk sister KTAR. The move brings the outlets full circle as KPKX was the original KTAR-FM, whose calls reside at its news/talk sister at 92.3. KPKX changed its call letters to KMVP-FM on January 9.
6	Mapleton Communications expands its broadcasting portfolio to Louisiana with the acquisition of Opus Media Partners' properties in Alexandria and Monroe, thus ending Opus' foray as a broadcaster.
6	Panama City Beach, Florida, picks up a dance outlet, as WPCF & W227CE drops Caribbean music to become "Play 93.9."
7	Tyler Media Group adds a pair of Spanish-language outlets in Tulsa, regional Mexican KRVT and Spanish religious KZLI, to its broadcasting portfolio. KRVT will be rebranded as "La Z 1270" and change call letters to KLUZ and KZLI will switch to an English-language hybrid religious/community talk format
8	Curtis Media Group announced that it has purchased oldies WKIX-FM/Raleigh from McClatchey Broadcasting, which plans to move WKIX-FM to 102.3 and flip it to country under a TMA with a new company that will be run by Donna Curtis McClatchey, the daughter of Curtis Media owner Don Curtis. Curtis in turn will move top 40/CHR WWPL to 102.9, giving that signal better coverage in Raleigh area. 102.3 would later become country-formatted WKJO, while WKIX-FM kept its classic-hits format on 102.9 and WWPL instead moved to 96.9, replacing that station's simulcast of WYMY "La Ley 101.1."
10	Clear Channel makes a pair of format changes in two markets: In Phoenix, KYOT-FM drops rhythmic AC for variety hits as "95.5 The Mountain," filling the void left open by KMVP-FM after they flipped to sports four days earlier. They become the fourth Phoenix station in ten days to make a format flip or change.; In Sacramento, KHLX breaks from the simulcast of KFBK & KFBK-FM to become "B92.5 Country" (and adopts the new call letters KBEB), putting it in competition with CBS Radio's KNCI and Entravision's KNTY.
10	One week after taking over the Merlin-owned stations in a LMA, Cumulus Media moves the alternative rock format of WKQX-LP/Chicago (87.7 FM) to WIQI (101.1 FM), with both stations operating under a short-term simulcast. The move restores alt-rock to 101.1, which had a nearly two-decade run with the format before its 2011 purchase by Merlin Media.
13	Clear Channel Media and Entertainment announces the retirement of the company's Co-chairman/CEO, John Hogan, who steps down from that position after 15 years, while fellow Co-chairman/CEO Bob Pittman has signed a 5-year deal to remain with the company. Pittman will absorb Hogan's duties full-time and report to CFO Rich Bressler.
13	A major acquisition takes place among a pair of locally owned broadcasters in Salt Lake City, as Broadway Media purchases the assets of Simmons Media Group for $11 million. Broadway had been operating Simmons' Salt Lake properties under a LMA since October 2013.
14	A pair of Greenup, Kentucky-based outlets switched formats, as WLGC drops oldies for news while its FM sister goes from country to classic hits, putting the latter in direct competition with Clear Channel's Huntington, West Virginia-based WBVB.
16	After raising concerns that it hasn't adequately complied with supplying the agency with ownership information so it can determine if it is at least 75% owned by U.S. citizens (as foreign ownership must be capped at 25%), as well as only supplying mailing addresses instead of a physical one, The Federal Communications Commission has informed Pandora Radio that they have denied their application to purchase KXMZ/Rapid City, South Dakota. Pandora filed papers in June 2013 to take over the adult top 40 outlet as a way to take advantage of the lower rates that Internet streaming services owned by terrestrial radio stations enjoy. Despite the setback, Pandora says it will pursue plans to make the application more compliant to FCC rules and regulations. Pandora immediately filed a petition for a declaratory ruling on June 30, claiming that Pandora is 80% owned by Americans and that the FCC's rules on foreign ownership are flawed.
17	Adult top 40 WFLC/Miami becomes the second station in the market this month to switch formats, becoming top 40/CHR "Hits 97.3." The flip will now put the Cox Radio outlet up against a pair of heritage top 40s, Clear Channel's Mainstream rival WHYI-FM and Beasley Broadcasting's rhythmic WPOW.
19	KXOS/Los Angeles becomes the second station in the market to switch formats, as it drops their Spanish/English top 40/CHR presentation for regional Mexican, branded as "Radio Centro 93.9." The move puts the station in direct competition with KLAX-FM, Univision's KSCA, Entravision's simulcast of KDLD/KDLE, and Liberman Broadcasting's trimulcast of KBUA/KBUE/KEBN. The move came after KXOS hired former KLAX morning host Ricardo ‘El Mandril’ Sanchez for the same duties. Sanchez had been the subject of controversy during his tenure at KLAX, involving claims of ratings fraud and tampering, resulting in his program being taken off the air by KLAX's parent company Spanish Broadcasting System in November 2013.
20	JVC Media spins off WBXY/Gainesville, Florida, to RMA Media, who will flip WBXY to a simulcast of WGMA, a new station that will sign on at 99.7 and serve the Ocala area. JVC had already moved WBXY's dance format over to WXJZ in December 2013. WGMA and WBXY launched with an adult standards format on March 19.
21	WTAR/Norfolk announces that it will drop Comedy and return to its previous news/talk/sports hybrid format, picking up some of the programming from sister station WNIS.
22	KSOC/Dallas-Ft. Worth returns to urban adult contemporary after three years of urban oldies.
23	Phoenix sees its fifth station make a format change, as KVIB shifts from Spanish top 40 to Spanish AC.
30	CKUE-FM in Windsor, Ontario, abruptly dumps mainstream rock for a soft AC format as Lite FM.

=== February ===
Date	Event
1	A pair of Louisville stations makes changes: WLUE ends its three-year run with adult contemporary and its leasing deal with WAY-FM after it decided not to buy the station for financial reasons. WAY-FM in turn takes back the station and restores the Christian contemporary format it had before it was leased out in 2010. Also on the same day, ESPN Radio affiliate WHBE adds an FM signal as it drops the simulcast of regional Mexican WTUV to simulcast WHBE's programming (that station would change from WTUV-FM to WHBE-FM in May).
3	Cumulus Media increases the number of "Nash FM" stations to 11 with the addition of WKDF/Nashville, KRMD/Shreveport, WIWF/Charleston, South Carolina, WKOR/Columbus, Mississippi, WXTA/Erie, WFBE/Flint, WYZB/Fort Walton Beach, Florida, WTNR/Grand Rapids, WXBM-FM/Pensacola and WZCY-FM/Harrisburg making the conversion to the country formatted brand today. Another outlet, WPSK-FM/Blacksburg, Virginia, will follow on February 5.
3	Sirius XM Radio eliminates the air staff lineup positions at '50s on 5 and '90s on 9 in a cost-cutting move, resulting in the decades-focused music channels to go jockless. Among the air staffers pink-slipped from the outlets were Norm N. Nite and Jim Kerr and Ken Merson (from '50s on 5), and Jojo Morales and KT Harris (from '90s on 9).
3	Columbia, South Carolina, picks up its third sports outlet, as Cumulus-owned WISW drops conservative talk to affiliate with co-owned NBC Sports Radio, joining FM sister station WNKT in the sports format.
5	After 3 years with Triple-A, KCKC/Kansas City returns to AC as "KC102.1."
7	Adult top 40 WPLJ/New York morning host Scott Shannon announced his "retirement" from radio after nearly four decades, jeopardizing the future of the nationally syndicated True Oldies Channel that Shannon founded and hosted. But on February 24, Shannon revealed that he had signed a deal to become the morning host at oldies rival WCBS-FM, where he will start March 3.
7	Another Cumulus Country outlet, WNNF/Cincinnati, makes the conversion to the "Nash FM" brand.
10	JVC Media makes more changes in its Gainesville, Florida, cluster, this time by flipping WYGC from a simulcast of country sister WTRS to classic hits as "WOW 104.9," bringing that format back to the market after three years, when it was dropped by its now adult top 40 sister station WMFQ
11	WJHM/Orlando officially shifts from rhythmic to top 40/CHR and relaunches its branding from "102 Jamz" to "101.9 AMP Radio."
11	Emmis Communications expands its New York City cluster with the purchase of urban adult contemporary WBLS and Gospel WLIB from YMF Media for $131 million (USD). Both properties have operated under a LMA since 2012, when it arranged a leasing deal with ESPN Radio to take over WBLS' former rival WRKS (now WEPN-FM) and allowing YMF to pick up WRKS' programming and content.
17	WKJY/Long Island places morning hosts Steve Harper (who is also WKJY's PD) and Leeana Karlson on suspension after fabricating a letter they read on their show on February 12 from a parent who would not allow their child to attend a birthday party of a child of a same-sex couple. Station management later learned afterwards that they used this made-up story so they can create a "healthy discourse on a highly passionate topic" but failed to notify the management prior to going on the air with this false letter.
17	The Tribune Company takes over the programming operations of WKQX-LP/Chicago and places a sports format on the LPTV signal as "87.7 The Game" with the new calls WGWG-LP. The station will broadcast the format until 2015, when all LPTVs in the United States will cease operating on analog signals.
17	KDAL-FM/Duluth-Superior pulls the plug on active rock to fill the market's vacant AC void and brands itself as "FM 95.7."
18	KCRW/Los Angeles announces the acquisition of classical KDB-FM/Santa Barbara, and will partner with Antioch University to create a local studio on campus with some student involvement. As a result of this deal, KCRW's programming will move to the University of Southern California's KQSC, while USC's programming will move to the 93.7 frequency and retain the KDB calls as part of a trade swap.
18	Sydney, Australia-based APN News & Media announces that they will acquire the 50% stake that Clear Channel owns in Australian Radio Network for $246.5 million (AUS) (US$225 million).
20	KXJM/Portland relaunched their rhythmic format and changed their moniker to "JAMN' 107.5." This time around, the music continues to focus on current rhythmic hits, but now incorporates more hip hop and a gold component to its library featuring older rhythmic product (old school R&B, hip-hop, and club classics), while decreasing on dance-pop tracks, using the slogan "Jams from Today & Back in the Day". The station's moniker is based on sister station WJMN/Boston.
20	Family Life Radio sells Christian talk KRGN/Amarillo, Texas, to Midessa Broadcasting, who will convert the station to commercial status after the sale.
24	The Fort Wayne radio market sees a pair of clusters acquired by one company, as the newly revived Adams Communications purchases Summit City Media (the owners of rhythmic top 40 WNHT, classic rock WXKE and oldies simulcast WGL & WGL-FM) and Russ Oasis Media (the owners of top 40/CHR WJFX, 1990s' hits WHPP and country WBTU). Since the deal has the number of stations over the limit (six FMs), Adams will swap WGL-FM to Calvary Radio Network in exchange for its translator at 103.3 and swap WHPP to Ft. Wayne Catholic Radio in exchange for its AM outlet WLYV to comply with FCC rules.
25	After four days of stunting with Frank Sinatra's "New York City", KKRG/Albuquerque flipped from Hispanic rhythmic to rhythmic adult contemporary with a heavy emphasis on old school R&B/hip-hop hits from the '90s and 2000s as "Yo! 101.3."
26	Vision Communications announces its intent to acquire the remnants of Pembrook Pines Media Group.
28	The FM simulcast of conservative talk WCOA/Pensacola flips to classic hits as "Jet 100.7" and changes calls to WJTQ (a "homage" to its previous life as WJLQ and to its current moniker).
28	Another Cumulus Media outlet flips to the "Nash FM" country brand, as classic hits WOMG/Columbia becomes the latest convert, and joins an already crowded field that includes WCOS-FM and WWNQ.
28	The Jack FM branding comes to Halifax, as Lite 92.9 CFLT-FM makes the flip to the variety hits format.
28	Two Corus radio stations in Ontario made their format change More 103.9 CKDK-FM in Woodstock, Ontario, abruptly abandons the Greatest Hits format for Country becoming Country 104 while CKWS-FM in Kingston, Ontario, becomes Hits 104.3 FM with an AC format

=== March ===
Date	Event
3	After nearly 30 years of soft AC, KLTI/Des Moines relaunches with an upbeat current AC presentation as "More 104" and changes call letters to KMYR to reflect the new handle and musical direction. They become the third outlet in the Iowa capital to make format changes this year.
3	The Jack FM format exits Jackson, Mississippi, as WJXN-FM flips to classic country.
5	Buckley Broadcasting announces that it will sell its Connecticut radio stations — WDRC AM-FM in Hartford, WSNG in Torrington, WWCO in Waterbury, and WMMW in Meriden — to Connoisseur Media. Following the sale, all of Buckley's remaining stations will be in California.
6	After four struggling years of active rock, WCMG/Florence, South Carolina, returns to its previous urban AC format and revives the "Magic 94.3" moniker.
6	Another Clear Channel outlet will take the KISS-FM brand moniker, as KWNW/Memphis becomes the latest convert. This will be the first time since 2001 that the brand has been used in this market, which was last used at KWNW's current top 40/CHR rival WHBQ-FM.
6	Corus Radio dismisses the on-air staff of active rock CKQB-FM in Ottawa, leaving the station jockless until March 31, when they flip the station to top 40/CHR as "Jump 106.9". The flip gives the Canadian capital city two top 40 outlets, as it faces rival station CIHT-FM.
7	Triple-A KDBZ/Anchorage flips to oldies, putting it in competition with KEAG.
7	Talk Radio Network drops its two-year-old lawsuit against Westwood One after coming to amicable terms with the network's new owner, Cumulus Media Networks.
9	Community radio station WOOL/Bellows Falls, Vermont, signs on a 550-watt facility at 91.5, supplanting its former 6-watt low-power FM license at 100.1, which began broadcasting in 2005 and left the air a month earlier.
10	After spending four years with a top 40/CHR direction, KHHM/Sacramento returns to its previous rhythmic top 40 format.
10	Buckley Broadcasting announces that it will sell KSEQ/Fresno to Lotus Communications.
14	Univision pulls the plug on yet another Latin rhythmic outlet, as the Bay Area simulcast of KVVF (Santa Clara) & KVVZ (San Rafael) begins stunting with Nelly's "Hot In Herre" non-stop from 3 p.m. onwards, triggering a viral sensation and even a Twitter account based around the stunt. KVVF/KVVZ flipped to English-language rhythmic top 40 as "Hot 105.7" after the stunt ended on March 17, giving the San Jose area its first rhythmic outlet since KHQT exited the format in 1995, as well as new competition for San Francisco-based rhythmic rival KYLD, Mainstream rivals KMVQ and KREV, and R&B/hip-hop KMEL.
18	After stunting with St. Patrick's Day music, AC WRWN/Savannah relaunches with classic hits
20	After nearly 29 years of billing themselves as "Majic 95.1," WAJI/Fort Wayne is the latest AC outlet to make a musical adjustment in its format, as it rebrands as "Best 95.1"
23	As WHWT/Huntsville exits the rhythmic top 40 format after six years to become a K-LOVE outlet under new owners Educational Media Foundation on this day, the now-displaced management and staff took to Twitter to blame the businesses for not supporting the station since its 2008 launch.
23	WARQ/Columbia, South Carolina, is the latest station in the market to flip formats, as it drops active rock for adult top 40.
24	Citing that "Jack FM just wasn't doing it for us," KDHT/Denver flips to classic alternative as "107X."
27	U.S. Representative Mike Rogers announces he will not seek re-election and will join Cumulus Media Networks as a talk show host.
27	After 18 months on the air, Christian AC WTCF/Winchester, Virginia, drops the format due to a lack of funding; the "Cross FM" programming will continue online. WTCF then picked up the Southern Gospel format previously heard on former sister station WTRM before that station's 2013 sale to the American Family Association.
29	A tower in North Adams, Massachusetts, carrying the antennas for WUPE-FM and a translator for WFCR/Amherst, along with an adjacent cell tower, collapse as a result of high winds, forcing WUPE and the WFCR translator off the air. WUPE stated that it would resume broadcasting with a temporary antenna by April 1. WUPE's AM simulcast in Pittsfield and its web stream were not affected by the tower collapse.
30	WSYR/Syracuse, New York, dismisses gardening host Terry Ettinger and progressive talk host George Kilpatrick, both of whom had been at the station for over 20 years each, from their weekend positions on the station. Kilpatrick's program on sister station WHEN continues.
31	Adult top 40 CKZZ-FM/Vancouver revived its former moniker "Z95.3" after seven years under new owner Newcap Radio. The station had used the Virgin Radio branding until its sale from former owner Astral Media (which licensed the branding) closed this month. To meet ownership limits, Bell Media, who bought out Astral earlier in 2013, already owned CFBT-FM and CHQM-FM, and had to sell CKZZ, CHHR-FM and CISL (AM), all of which were sold to Newcap. The Virgin Radio brand is expected to move over to CFBT-FM's sister station CHQM-FM, which has transferred some of CKZZ's personalities over to that station.

=== April ===
Date	Event
2	Univision makes major changes at its radio stations, as its air staffers and employees are pink-slipped along with a restructuring that will see several stations rebrand and add voice tracking from its properties in New York City, Los Angeles, and San Antonio, all done as a cost-cutting move to improve its portfolio.
4	Just two days after they were among the personnel that was let go by Univision, four former air staffers from its Albuquerque cluster – DJ Lopez, Johnny V, and MQ from rhythmic top 40 KKSS, and Julian Robles from regional Mexican KJFA — cross the street to join American General Media's radio cluster. Lopez is named PD for rival rhythmic KAGM, top 40/CHR KDLW and alternative KARS, and will do a midday shift at KAGM; Johnny V and MQ will hold down afternoons and evenings at KAGM respectively; Robles will take an air shift position at KLVO.
15	Immaculate Heart Radio announces the acquisition of Gospel outlet KTYM/Inglewood-Los Angeles from Trans-America Broadcasting for $6 million (a majority of which will come from funds and donations), paving the way for IHR to target the largest market in the United States with a large Catholic population.
17	WVVE/Panama City, Florida, flipped from hot AC to rhythmic oldies as "100.1 The Groove."
17	WFNB/Terre Haute drops Bob FM for adult top 40 as "B92.7."
17	Larry Wilson's two broadcasting companies, Portland, Oregon-based Alpha Broadcasting and L&L Broadcasting, will now merge into one company, Alpha Media. At the same time, the company confirmed the acquisition of Main Line Broadcasting for $57 million, pending statutory approvals. The merger and acquisition will result in Alpha operating 68 stations in twelve U.S. radio markets.
21	KWQW/Des Moines relaunches its talk format, rebranding itself as "98.3 The Torch."
22	The Detroit Pistons switch flagship stations in Detroit, moving from WXYT-FM to WMGC-FM for the 2014-15 NBA season. The switch will allow Pistons games to air without schedule conflicts from Lions, Red Wings and Tigers broadcasts on WXYT, thus ending an exclusive monopoly by the CBS Radio outlet.

=== May ===
Date	Event
1	After nearly six years of obtaining network programming from WestwoodOne's "True Oldies Channel" (and operating under an oldies format), KJOC (1170 AM) of Davenport, Iowa, switches its format to sports, obtaining a large majority of its programming from ESPN Radio. It is the same format and network KJOC had from 1993 to 2003.
1	After two years with a tropical format, WTMP/Tampa will return to its previous life as a full-service urban AC/talk that served the African-American community for 57 years prior to its 2011 format switch under new owners WestCoast Media via a LMA with Davidson Media.
2	A year after KVIL/Dallas tweaked its format to a hot AC/adult top 40-leaning fare, Mediabase made it official by moving the station from "AC" to "Hot AC" full-time.
5	Digity Media acquires 48 stations that are owned by Three Eagles Communications, expanding its portfolio of stations to 113.
8	After two years as a top 40/CHR, only to face a crowded field against three other outlets that included two rhythmics, KPXR-FM/Spokane returns to its former country format and its "Kix 96.1" moniker, under new call sign KIIX-FM. They also become the second top 40 outlet (after KGZG-FM) to exit the format in Spokane in less than a month of each other.
9	Wilks Broadcasting spins off one of its four stations in the Reno market, as it sells classic rock KURK to EMF, who will flip it to the Air1 format after the sale. On June 30, KURK will move to 100.9, replacing outgoing adult top 40 KMXW.
14	JVC Media expands its station roster to three more stations and its third radio market, as it acquires WSWN and WBGF from BGI, inc., and WSVU and its FM translators from North Palm Beach Broadcasting in the West Palm Beach area. On September 23, WBGF flips from Regional Mexican to Heritage Rock as "93.5 The Bar."
15	A three-way deal is made between Qantum Communications, Clear Channel, and Connoisseur Media that will see 31 stations exchange hands. Clear Channel will take over 29 stations in Alabama, Georgia, Massachusetts, and South Carolina from Quantum, who in turn will take over and then sell Clear Channel's Long Island, New York, outlets WALK and WALK-FM to Connoisseur.
16	After spending nine years of playing Hispanic rhythmic hits, KXOL-FM/Los Angeles drops the format for Spanish contemporary and brands itself as "Mega 96.3." This will be the second station in Los Angeles to use the "Mega" moniker, as it was previously used at KCMG during its time as a rhythmic oldies outlet from 1997 to 2001.
22	WNOW-FM/New York City relaunches its top 40/CHR format and rebrands its moniker from "92.3 Now" to "92.3 AMP Radio." They become the fifth station to adopt parent company CBS Radio's "AMP" brand. On June 23, the station changed its call letters to WBMP to match the "AMP" handle.
22	Entercom alternative WBZA/Rochester, New York, fires morning hosts Kimberly Rae and Barry Beck after they made "hateful" comments involving Rochester's announced decision on May 17 to extend medical benefits for transgender employees. The moves comes on the heels of an unrelated incident that lead to a previous suspension the week earlier.
23	Richmond gains another adult contemporary outlet, as WHTI is relaunched as "Easy 100.9." The soft-based presentation will go up against WTVR-FM and oldies WBBT-FM/WARV-FM in the battle for 25–54 listeners. As a result of the flip, WHTI moved its top 40/CHR format over to an FM translator (at 106.1) and to the HD2 sub-channel of WURV.
26	Cumulus Media adds another outlet to its San Francisco Bay Area portfolio, as it acquires KSJO/San Jose from Universal Media Access, then immediately flips the station from brokered ethnic programming to country and takes the "Nash FM" brand.
28	Midwest Communications expands its portfolio of stations to Evansville, Knoxville and Nashville with the acquisition of South Central Communications.
30	Cumulus Media expands the "Nash FM" brand to Albuquerque via the rebranding of country outlet KRST.
31	A day before its previously announced sale was set to close, Vision Communications backs out of its plan to buy Pembrook Pines Media Group after rival Community Broadcasters, LLC and previous bidder Titan Radio filed objections with the FCC. A court order allows Pembrook Pines' receiver to terminate Vision's existing local marketing agreements.

=== June ===
Date	Event
2	Adams Communications made a series of formatic shake ups in Fort Wayne upon the completed sale of Summit City Media and Russ Oasis Media: classic rock WXKE moves from 103.9 to 96.3, displacing WNHT and its rhythmic top 40 format, WGL flips from oldies to sports and affiliates with Fox Sports, former simulcast WGL-FM switches to Christian contemporary and adopts the new calls WJCI under new owner Calvary Radio Network, and WHPP drops 1990s hits and began simulcasting WLYV until July 1, when Adams will launch a new format after it takes over WLYV. Both country WBTU and top 40/CHR WJFX will keep their formats intact. On June 20, WXKE's former home at 103.9 flipped to soft AC as "Soft Rock 103.9" with the new calls WWFW.
2	Two comedy outlets in West Virginia flipped formats: WBBD/Wheeling to Fox Sports and WLRX/Huntington to classic country.
2	After 18 months with urban AC format, WHTU/Lynchburg flips to classic hits.
5	Major League Baseball's Chicago Cubs announce a deal with CBS Radio-owned WBBM that will see WBBM become the flagship station of the Cubs Radio Network in 2015. The deal will see all regular season and post-season Cubs games air on WBBM (or on its simulcast station, WCFS-FM, should a conflict with Chicago Bears broadcasts arise), with Pat Hughes and Ron Coomer continuing as the play-by-play team. The deal means an end to the Cubs' relationship with WGN at the end of the 2014 season; WGN (which is owned by Tribune Company, the Cubs' former owners) had been airing Cubs games since 1925 and had been the team's exclusive radio flagship since 1958.
5	Classic Country WJSJ/Jacksonville enters the market's top 40/CHR race against WAPE-FM and WKSL as "Coast 105.3". Despite having a good signal coverage in Duval County, WJSJ is billing themselves as "Nassau County's Hit Music Station" (WJSJ is licensed to Fernadina Beach, which is in Nassau County).
5	KSQN/Salt Lake City dropped its simulcast with conservative talk KLO and changed their format to adult contemporary, branded as "Sunny 103." The move will place them in competition with the more established KSFI.
6	The Last Bastion Trust spins off active rock KRDJ/New Iberia, Louisiana, to Bible Broadcasting Network, who'll convert the station to non-commercial status as a religious outlet that will serve both Lafayette and Baton Rouge as a satellite affiliate for BBN's Charlotte flagship station WYFQ.
12	Pittsburgh-based Steel City Media (the owners of adult top 40 WLTJ and adult hits WRRK) expands its portfolio of stations with the purchase of Wilks Broadcasting's Kansas City cluster of top 40/CHR KMXV, AC KCKC and country sisters KFKF-FM and KBEQ.
12	Univision announces that it will put itself up for sale and has begun talks with several suitors, including CBS and Time Warner, about acquiring the Hispanic-based media conglomerate, which is led by Haim Saban's Saban Capital Group, Madison Dearborn Partners, Providence Equity Partners, Thomas H. Lee Partners, TPG Capital, and a 5% investment stake from Mexico's Televisa. The investors are seeking at least $20 billion for the entire company.
13	The "Evolution" dance format is dropped in Boston, as WEDX changes to a country music format, branded as "101.7 The Bull," with a call change to WBWL following on June 30; the new format competes against established country station WKLB-FM. The "Evolution" programming is moved to the HD2 channel of sister station WXKS-FM.
13	The Quad Cities sees yet another format flip, this time from adult top 40 KQCS, which will become a simulcast of the recently relaunched ESPN Radio affiliate KJOC.
16	In the wake of an investigation into ratings fraud and tampering that has plagued the Los Angeles radio market, especially among the Hispanic radio outlets, an unidentified employee from regional Mexican KSCA is fired by parent company Univision upon learning of the person's involvement in the case. This comes on the heels of an announcement from Nielsen Audio on June 12 that it would recalculate and reissue the Los Angeles April 2014 PPM based ratings and delay the May 2014 PPM ratings until June 17, saying it needed time to perform "quality control reviews."
17	After nearly five years, the first—and last remaining—"Generation X" formatted station in the United States, WLGX/Louisville, transitions to adult top 40 (with recurrents from the 1990s and 2000s) as "100.5 My FM." The move will put them in competition with rival WXMA.
19	Just one day after announcing her departure from WQHT/New York City, Angie Martinez announces that she has signed with rival R&B/hip-hop WWPR-FM as their new afternoon host and will have her program voice-tracked to sister station WMIB/Miami in the same time period. The move comes in the wake of Cumulus' plans to launch an urban formatted outlet in New York City, as suburban AC move-in WFAS-FM will adopt an urban AC presentation (with the new call letters WNBM) to go after WBLS starting July 4. The station had been mentioned as the next radio gig for Martinez, but her signing with WWPR ended those rumors immediately.
20	CHHR/Vancouver drops triple-A for classic hits and takes the new call letters CHLG-FM, in turn a tribute to CKLG, which has heritage in the market as a once-popular top 40 that resided at 730 AM from 1955 to 2001.
20	Salt Lake City sees yet another format change, as KENZ drops classic hits for variety hits as "Trax 101.9."
24	LKCM Broadcasting, the owners of dance/EDM KYLI/Bunkerville-Las Vegas, announced that it has ended its three-year partnership with the interactive Jelli platform, replacing the presentation with the Pulse 87 dance/EDM brand and relaunched as "Pulse 96.7", bringing that brand back to radio just five years after its demise at WNYZ-LP/New York City and its failed attempt to expand the brand to other cities. The Pulse 87 brand will continue to be offered online.
26	With the Jelli platform shutting down on June 29, two more stations that also used the platform beside KYLI, WJLI/Paducah, Kentucky and KSKR-FM/Roseburg, Oregon, both rebranded their presentations and monikers. WJLI adopts "Rock 98.3" for their classic rock format, while KSKR-FM holds a "goodbye ceremony" for its Top 40/CHR moniker.

=== July ===
Date	Event
2	The Evolution Dance/EDM format comes to Honolulu as the HD2 subchannel of Rhythmic AC KHJZ and the translator of Hawaiian contemporary KDNN (at 99.1, which had programmed a Traditional Hawaiian/Country hybrid, which will continue on KDNN's HD2 subchannel) becomes the latest convert. This will give the Hawaiian state capitol two Dance/EDM outlets as it takes on KXRG-LP for listeners.
3	Anthony Cumia is abruptly fired from The Opie and Anthony Show (at the time airing on Sirius XM Radio) for comments he posted on Twitter. Sirius XM also forced remaining hosts Gregg Hughes and Jim Norton to honor the remainder of their contract, preventing them from leaving with Cumia and ensuring the show at least nominally stays on the air, as the revamped Opie with Jim Norton Show.
5	A Prairie Home Companion celebrates its 40th anniversary.
9	Another format flip takes place in the Quad Cities, as KBOB-FM trades in active rock for country as "104.9 The Hawk."
10	Rawlco Communications sells 9 stations in Alberta (Edmonton's CIUP-FM and CKNW) and Saskatchewan (Prince Albert's CKBI, CFMM-FM and CHQX-FM; North Battleford's CJNB, CJCQ-FM and CJHD-FM; Meadow Lake's CJNS-FM) to the Jim Pattison Group.
22	After 92 years as a commercial broadcaster, KHJ/Los Angeles is sold by Libermann Broadcasting to Immaculate Heart Radio, who will drop the regional Mexican format for non-commercial Catholic programming once the sale is completed; IHR began programming KHJ November 17. On November 5, Liberman moved KHJ's Regional Mexican format to sister station KWIZ, replacing the latter's Spanish Top 40 format.
25	21st Century Fox informs Entercom that it is pulling all of its advertising and promotional tie-ins to television series owned by Fox Television Studios, network programming from FOX and its cable network division (Fox News Channel, Fox Sports Networks, Fox Business Network, FX/FXX, Fox Movie Channel), and motion pictures produced by 20th Century Fox from all Entercom stations nationwide. The move came after Kirk Minihane, a co-host on the Dennis and Callahan show at Entercom's Sports outlet WEEI-FM/Boston (which is also simulcast on NESN) made sexist comments about Fox Sports reporter Erin Andrews about her interview with St. Louis Cardinals pitcher Adam Wainwright during the 2014 MLB All-Star Game on July 15 (in which Wainwright went up to Andrews to apologize for comments he made about New York Yankees player Derek Jeter), which resulted in Minihane being suspended for one week after he made an "apology" that included more sexist comments against her.
28	CHNI-FM in Saint John, New Brunswick flips from all-news to mainstream rock branded as Rock 88.9 launching with 30 days of commercial free music before broadcasting its regular on-air programming on August 25
30	The E.W. Scripps Company and Journal Communications announce that the two companies will merge to form a broadcast group under the E.W. Scripps Company name, which will include the 35 radio stations currently owned by Journal. The transaction is slated to be completed in 2015, pending shareholder and regulatory approvals. On August 20, Scripps announced that it will spin off one of the five Wichita FM properties (either Classic Country KFTI-FM, Active Rock KICT-FM, Country KFDI-FM, Classic Rock KFXJ or Regional Mexican KYQQ) as part of a divestiture plan, as the FCC limits the Wichita radio market ownership to four FMs. On October 10, Journal spun off KFTI to Envision Industries, who will use the station to broadcast programming geared to the blind and visually impaired. Although Envision is a non-profit organization, KFTI-FM (whose new calls will be KKGQ after the sale) will continue to operate with a commercial license.

=== August ===
Date	Event
1	EMF enters the Hartford market with the acquisition of WCCC-FM from Marlin Broadcasting, who informed the air staff that their jobs have terminated with the sale. The airstaff and alumni (including former morning host Howard Stern) were allowed to say goodbye for the final time before it signed off for good. At 5 pm, EMF then replaced WCCC-FM's classic rock format with EMF's K-LOVE format. Sister station WCCC also ended its classical format to simulcast K-Love.
1	Lee "Hacksaw" Hamilton departs XEPRS-AM/Tijuana-San Diego on amicable terms.
1	The San Francisco Bay Area Classic Rock simulcast of KUFX/San Jose and KUZX/San Francisco is broken up, as KUZX flips to Rhythmic Hot AC as "Q102.1, The Beat Of The Bay," under the new call sign KRBQ. KUFX will now focus on targeting the San Jose area with its current format.
1	KLTH/Portland, Oregon, adjusts its Classic Hits direction and rebrands from "Oldies 106.7" to "106.7 The Eagle."
1	CKMP-FM/Calgary adjusts their Top 40/CHR direction by adopting the proprietary "QuickHitz" format, which increases the number of song being played in an hour from 12 to 24. This change, however, led to legal threats from the artists, leading CKMP to return to the full tracks on the 19th of the month.
6	A collection of competing radio stations including WBUF, WTSS, WJYE, WGRF and WHTT-FM in Buffalo, New York, along with WCMF-FM in neighboring Rochester, admit they have blacklisted music from the band Bon Jovi after the band's namesake and lead singer, Jon Bon Jovi, placed a bid along with a Toronto-based consortium to buy the Buffalo Bills, raising fears that Bon Jovi and company would move the team to Toronto at the first opportunity in 2020. (The bid itself was ultimately unsuccessful, as the Bon Jovi-MLSE consortium lost the Bills bidding to the Pegula family.)
7	The news/talk format is shuffled in Pittsburgh, as WJAS, after being sold to Radio Partners, LLC, flips from Adult Standards to the format as NewsTalk 1320 WJAS at Noon, adopting many of the shows, including Rush Limbaugh, Sean Hannity, and Glenn Beck, from decade-old FM talker WPGB, who redirected listeners to the new station before flipping to country as Big 104.7 at 3 pm that day.
8	Adult Top 40 WMIA-FM/Miami rebrands as My 93.9, with an adjustment towards a traditional Hot AC presentation.
8	KJR-FM/Seattle adjusts its Classic Hits direction to include 80's music as 95.7 The Jet
8	CKNI-FM/Moncton flips from all-news to AC as 91.9 The Bend.
8	In San Antonio, KZEP-FM suddenly drops its classic rock format, after carrying a rock format in some form since signing on as KITE-FM in 1966, and flips to classic-leaning Rhythmic CHR as Hot 104.5. The old classic rock format moves to 104.5 HD2, which begins simulcasting on translator K227BH at 93.3, which drops its simulcast of classic country KRPT.
9	Classic Rock WKAZ-FM/Charleston, WV flips to what can only be described as a very broad Variety Hits format as Tailgate 107.3, branding itself as "America's very first no rules radio station" and apparently directing itself at the students at West Virginia University.
11	AC WRHD/Greenville, NC flips to Sports as "94.3 The Game".
13	KOOO/Omaha shifts from Variety Hits "The Big O" to 80s-based Classic Rock as "101.9 The Keg," filling the void left by KQBW in September 2012 when it flipped to Top 40/CHR as KISO.
13	Honolulu gains another Alternative outlet, as KPOI-FM drops Active Rock to become "Alt 105.9." The flip will put the station in competition with KUCD.
13	Another format flip takes place in Phoenix, as KVIB drops the Spanish AC format after 8 months for English-language Soft AC as "95.1 The Oasis." The rimshot FM (who will gain a translator to cover the southeastern portion of the metro) will take the more established KESZ for the 25–54 audience
15	Cumulus Media expands the "Nash FM" brand with the launch of the Classic Country-themed "Nash Icon" platform. Among the 13 stations that switched to the new format includes KQLK/Lake Charles, Louisiana (from Rhythmic Top 40), KJJY/Des Moines (from Country), WJBC-FM/Bloomington, Illinois (from News/Talk), WSM-FM/Nashville (from Country), KRMW/Fayetteville, Arkansas (from AC), WZRR/Birmingham (from Top 40/CHR), KBZU/Albuquerque (from Classic Rock), WNUQ/Albany, Georgia (from Top 40/CHR), WZAT/Savannah (from CBS Sports Radio), KRRF/Oxnard-Ventura, California (from Classic Hits), WWWQ-HD2/Atlanta (from Oldies/Classic Hits), KCMO-HD2/Kansas City (also from CBS Sports Radio), WLAW/Muskegon, Michigan (from Country), and WDRQ-HD2/Detroit (from Rhythmic Hot AC).
15	In the wake of KZEP/San Antonio's flip from Classic Rock to Rhythmic Top 40 (which in turn resulted in the former moving to a HD2 subchannel and an FM translator), rival outlet KTKX adjusts its presentation by relaunching as "106.7 The Eagle."
18	Cedar Rapids, Iowa, picks up its third Top 40/CHR, as KOSY-FM dropped its simulcast of News/Talk sister WMT to become "Y95.7."
25	KFWB/Los Angeles' 46-year legacy as a News/Talk outlet comes to an end with a flip to sports, as it becomes the affiliate of CBS Sports Radio.
25	Corus Radio rebrands two radio stations in Cornwall, Ontario CJSS-FM rebrands as Boom 101.9 maintaining the classic hits format while CFLG-FM rebrands to 104.5 Fresh FM becoming the fifth Corus radio station to adopt the "Fresh" branding
29	After stunting with songs by artists that were born in Kansas, KTHR/Wichita flips from Classic Rock to Alternative as "ALT 107.3."
29	The last remaining Smooth Jazz outlet in the Clear Channel portfolio, KMYT/Temecula, California, flips to Triple-A as "Radio 94.5"
29	CKRU-FM/Peterborough, Ontario, transitions from Classic Hits to AC as "Hits 100.5."
29	XHIM-FM/Ciudad Juarez/El Paso drops Classic Rock for gold-based Triple-A as "Universal 105.1."
29	WSKX/Portsmouth, New Hampshire, drops Variety Hits for Country, adopting Clear Channel's "Bull" branding.
29	KRSE/Yakima, Washington, drops Bob FM for Classic Rock as "105.7 The Hawk"
29	After six years, The Bubba the Love Sponge Show is dropped from flagship station WHPT/Tampa due to a decision to take the Hot Talk outlet in a different direction. Parent company Cox Media Group will continue to syndicate Bubba the Love Sponge's program to its six affiliated outlets until the end of 2014.
29	General Motors confirms reports that were posted on automotive and radio blogs that it will drop HD Radio from the following brands for the 2015 model year: the Chevrolet Traverse, Chevrolet Silverado, Buick Enclave and Buick Regal. Another brand, the Chevrolet Impala, was also listed as having its HD Radio feature dropped but will remain for the 2015 model year as GM is looking at adding more technological enhancements in future models.
29	KOCP/Camarillo, California, becomes the second Classic Hits outlet in the Oxnard-Ventura market to exit the format, as it flips to Rhythmic Oldies as "Old School 95.9."

=== September ===
Date	Event
1	The Jack FM format exits the Evansville market, as WEJK drops the format for Classic Hits, filling the void left by WJLT, who dropped the Classic Hits format to become an affiliate of ESPN Radio in July.
3	Regional Mexican WBZJ/Raleigh-Durham replaces WWPL as the part of the Top 40/CHR "Pulse FM" simulcast with WPLW, thus expanding its signal reach in the market. WWPL was spun off to another company earlier this year to move the station's format to a better signal.
3	CHGK-FM, Stratford, Ontario, flips to CHR/top 40 branded as "107.7 2Day FM".
4	Just five years after it became the first of five Clear Channel stations to launch the "Rush Radio" brand, WRNO-FM/New Orleans become the last station to retire the moniker as it rebrands itself as "News Talk 99.5 WRNO."
5	WBVX/Lexington, Kentucky, shifts from Classic Hits to Classic Rock, with an emphasis on less commercials and a local airstaff as it targets Clear Channel's Active Rock rival WKQQ, which uses voice-tracking and more ad time.
5	KBOQ/Salinas-Monterey, California, flips from AC to Classic Hits as "Q103.9."
5	JVC Media expands its Florida properties as it enters the Orlando radio market with the purchase of Spanish Top 40 WHKQ from TTB Media. The station flipped to Country on December 18 as "Wolf 103.1" and adopts the new calls WOTW.
5	Biloxi-Gulfport, Mississippi, picks up its third Country outlet, as WUJM drops Sports to become "96.7 The Bull."
7	KRNA/Cedar Rapids becomes the second station in the market to flip formats, as it shifts from Active Rock to Alternative.
8	WRNQ/Poughkeepsie, New York, rebrands its AC format, as it drops "Lite 92.1" to return to its former "Q92.1" moniker, which it used from 1989 to 2003.
8	KBOB/Quad Cities flips formats for the third time this year, as it drops ESPN Radio for Classic Country.
9	Another Jack FM outlet flips formats, as WYJK-FM/Wheeling, West Virginia, replaces the Adult Hits brand with a hybrid Sports/Rock presentation as "Rocky 96.5".
9	The Juice FM branding makes its way to Ontario as Hot AC Star 97.5 CKVV-FM, Kemptville, Ontario, flips to variety hits and adopts that branding.
10	Another major formatic shakeup takes place in Columbia, South Carolina, as R&B/Hip-Hop WHXT (licensed to Orangeburg from the southern portion of the metro) adds a simulcast with the LMA of Country outlet WSCZ (licensed to Winnsboro from the northern portion of the area).
11	The Rochester, New York, shakeup adds a series of surprises, as Clear Channel flips two of its properties to new formats: Classic Rock WQBW shifts to Rock as "Radio 95.1" with ex-WBZA morning hosts Kimberly & Beck taking an afternoon slot, while WODX drops Oldies/Classic Hits for Country as "107.3 The Bull" with new call letters WNBL. The news comes just as Entercom's Top 40/CHR WPXY-FM morning hosts Scott Spezzano and Sandy Waters are about to move over to the same slot at Alternative sister WBZA (replacing the fired Kimberly & Beck), with WPXY afternoon host Megan Carter and Corey James moving to WPXY's morning slot.
12	WRQE/Appleton-Green Bay drops its Active Rock format for Classic Country as "93.5 Duke FM" and revive the call sign WGEE-FM.
15	The simulcasts of Phoenix sports outlets KTAR & KMVP-FM splits off, with KTAR becoming a full-time simulcast of ESPN Radio while KMVP continues with local programming. The move now allows both stations to free up live broadcasts of Arizona Cardinals, Arizona Diamondbacks, Phoenix Suns, Phoenix Coyotes, and Arizona State University football and men & women's basketball games without any scheduling conflicts or overlaps.
15	Another sports outlet, WWCS/Pittsburgh, switched affiliations from Fox Sports Radio to Yahoo! Sports Radio, giving the Pittsburgh radio market its third formatic shakeup in a month.
15	Classic rocker CKEZ-FM New Glasgow officially makes its debut
16	After 42 years, San Antonio-based Clear Channel Communications changes its name to iHeartMedia, which was done to reflect its expansion to a multi-platform media entertainment company, based around the iHeartRadio brand and platform that is already incorporated into its 840 radio stations and related properties associated with the company. The move won't affect its co-owned divisions (Clear Channel Outdoor, Premiere Networks, Total Traffic and Weather Network, Katz Media Group and RCS), as they will continue to use their corporate names.
17	After 43 years as a Rock outlet, KDKB/Phoenix becomes the latest station in the market to flip formats, as it becomes Alternative "Alt AZ 93.3." The flip also brings the format back to Phoenix for the first time since KEXX dropped it for Adult Top 40 in January 2012.
19	WCGX/Columbus, Ohio, drops Alternative for R&B/Hip-Hop as "106.7 The Beat" (new call letters to be WZCB), putting it in competition with Radio One-owned Rhythmic rival WCKX.
19	Adams Communications expands its portfolio of stations to the Salisbury-Ocean City, Maryland, market with the acquisition of Great Scott Broadcasting's cluster of Rhythmic Top 40 WOCQ, Active Rock WZBH, Classic Rock WGBG-FM, Country WKHI, Spanish Contemporary WJWL, Variety Hits WJWK, and two FM translators. At the same time Great Scott also exits the business as the company's remaining properties, Adult Top 40 simulcast WKDB/WZEB, Classic Rock WJKI-FM, and Spanish Top 40 WXSH are sold to Voice Radio Network
26	WKQK/Memphis drops Classic Hits to return to its previous life as a Country outlet (which it had programmed from 1992 to 2001), this time as "94.1 The Wolf."
26	A jury in a United States District Court in Kansas City awards $1 million in damages to an Olathe, Kansas, woman who sued Alternative KRBZ over an April 20, 2012, prank in which morning hosts Afentra Bandokoudis and Daniel "Danny Boi" Terreros asked listeners to verify information about pornographic actresses that lived in the Kansas City area. After googling the name of one based on calls from two listeners, they mentioned the woman who they mistakenly thought was the actress in question and her high school she once attended on air, causing her emotional and psychological distress afterwards.
28	KNEW/San Francisco's nine-month run with Conservative Talk comes to an end with a format flip to Business/Tech Talk, as most of their shows moves over to rival KSFO. The move also marks a homecoming for Rush Limbaugh, Glenn Beck, and Sean Hannity, as KSFO was their original home for their shows in the Bay Area.

=== October ===
Date	Event
2	CBS Radio and Beasley Broadcast Group announces a major swap that sees Beasley's outlets in Philadelphia (Rhythmic Top 40 WRDW-FM and Country WXTU) and Miami (Rhythmic Top 40 WPOW, Country WKIS, and Sports WQAM) going to CBS in exchange for CBS spinning off its properties in Charlotte (Urban AC WBAV-FM, Top 40/CHR WNKS, R&B/Hip-Hop WPEG, AC WKQC, Country WSOC-FM, and Sports siblings WBCN and WFNZ), Tampa-St. Petersburg (Rhythmic Top 40 WLLD, Classic Hits WRBQ-FM, Spanish Top 40 WYUU, Sports combo WHFS & WHFS-FM, and Country WQYK-FM), and Philadelphia AM Sports WIP to Beasley.
3	KLIF-FM/Dallas-Ft. Worth rebrands its Top 40/CHR presentation from "i93" to "Hot 93.3," thus becoming the third station in the market to adopt the "Hot" brand.
3	Savannah sees yet another format flip, as Adult Top 40 WXYY transitions to Top 40/CHR, putting it in competition with iHeartMedia's WAEV.
8	After three years with All-News, KROI/Houston drops the format and terminates all 47 staffers, citing poor ratings as the reason, and begins stunting by only playing music by hometown singer Beyoncé as B92. A new format, Classic Hip-Hop, debuted on October 13 as "Boom 92".
10	WHIZ-FM/Zanesville, Ohio, transitions from Adult Top 40 to Top 40/CHR.
10	Buckley Broadcasting spins off six stations in California, four in Bakersfield (Top 40/CHR KLLY, News/Talk simulcast KNZR & KNZR-FM and Rhythmic oldies KKBB) and two in Merced (Country KUBB and Rhythmic Top 40 KHTN), to Alpha Media. The sale will leave Buckley with only one station left, ESPN Radio affiliate KIDD/Salinas-Monterey.
14	Modern AC WCLI-FM/Enon, Ohio (serving the Dayton radio market) begins stunting with Christmas music. Two days later, the Alpha Media-owned station debuted a classic country format as Hank FM, giving Dayton five Country outlets, and its third classic country station, the most ever in one market.
16	Another Alpha Media outlet, WDQX/Peoria, drops Classic Rock for Rhythmic-leaning Top 40/CHR as "Energy 102.3," giving Peoria its third Top 40 outlet as it takes on both Rhythmic WZPW and Mainstream WPIA.
17	For the third time in four years, WEZW/Wildwood Crest, New Jersey, becomes the first non-stunting commercial station to change to Christmas music for the 2014 season.
21	After 37 years of broadcasting, WOSO/San Juan, Puerto Rico signed off, after the Puerto Rico Electric Power Authority forced to shut down the station, and laid off 30 employees.
23	Meyer Communications announces that its Sports outlet KWTO-FM/Springfield, Missouri, will become the new affiliate of ESPN Radio, effective January 1, 2015. The current ESPN Radio affiliate, iHeartMedia's KGMY, will become a Fox Sports Radio affiliate on the same day.
24	The Pulse 87 Dance/EDM brand comes to Washington, D.C., as W249BE, the FM translator of Spanish AC WTNT, is announced as the newest convert.
31	Cumulus Media expands the Nash FM and Nash Icon brands to six more markets. Joining the Nash FM roster are KATC-FM/Colorado Springs, KTOP-FM/Topeka, and KBUL-FM/Reno, while Classic Hits WOGT/Chattanooga, News/Talk simulcast WVLK-FM/Lexington, and Classic Hits WORC-FM/Webster, Massachusetts, become the latest Nash Icon converts.

=== November ===
Date	Event
1	Just one month after it flipped to Adult Top 40, WALE/Saint Augustine, Florida, returns to Classic Hits as "Beach 105.5," using the same imaging as sister station WBHQ/Beverly Beach.
3	After a two-year run with Top 40/CHR, KLQT/Albuquerque returns to Rhythmic oldies, as it takes over the format from its FM translator sister station.
4	The Texas Rangers announces that it is switching its flagship station in the Dallas-Ft. Worth market after four years from KESN to KRLD-FM for the 2015 season as part of a multi-year deal. The move brings the American League Baseball franchise back to the CBS Radio Sports outlet, which shared it with its AM sister station from 2009 to 2010.
6	More radio changes in Columbia, South Carolina: iHeartMedia's WCOS drops Gospel and takes back the Sports format from WXBT, who in turn begins simulcasting Conservative Talk WVOC-FM, thus reversing the format back to the AM side; the FM flipped back to its former R&B/Hip-Hop format that it dropped in 2011 on December 11.
6	Radio One brings its second Classic Hip-Hop format to Philadelphia, as WPHI-FM drops R&B/Hip-Hop to become "Boom 107.9."
10	After an eleven-year run with Variety Hits, CKKL-FM/Ottawa dismisses the entire airstaff and drops the format, leaving it jockless and in a stunting mode. On November 12, CKKL flipped to Country as "94 New Country."
10	Cumulus Media expands the Nash FM platform to audio/digital cable as it signs a partnership deal with Music Choice.
13	Hubbard Broadcasting announces its planned purchase of the sixteen stations (all located in central and northern Minnesota) owned by Omni Broadcasting.
13	Citing rules that prohibits an entity to operate, lease, own, partner, or even broker a station that is licensed to the United States, and therefore are broadcasting in Canada illegally and without a license, the CRTC orders Surrey, British Columbia, broadcaster Radio India to cease operating its brokered Indian-language programming on KVRI/Blaine, Washington, effective immediately on this date, and must present a letter to the CRTC confirming that it has terminated their operations by November 20. Radio India is one of three Vancouver-based companies that were forced by the CRTC to cease operating brokered programming on American radio stations, with Sher-E-Punjab ending its programming on KRPI/Ferndale, Washington, on December 1 and Radio Punjab closing down its programming on KRPA/Oak Harbor, Washington, on January 15, 2015.
14	WWFF-FM/Huntsville ends its four-year run as AC "Journey 93.3" to return to Country as the latest convert to the Nash Icon brand.
14	In an interview with the Boston Herald, WKLB-FM morning co-host Lori Grande reveals she has been battling multiple sclerosis for the past eight years, and decided to go public with the disclosure to bring awareness to the disease.
14	Rhythmic Top 40 KZON/Phoenix shake up the entire lineup, including its morning slot, as it reunites afternoon host/MD Joey Boy with current morning host Lady La, both of whom worked in the same position at rival KKFR as "The Nutz." Their morning show will be called "The Morning Mess" at KZON.
14	The Springfield, Missouri Police Officers Association calls for a boycott against Rhythmic Top 40 KOSP after an altercation involving a traffic stop between a Springfield Police Department officer and KOSP morning host Rich Deaver, who, upset over how he was stopped and being suspected of having marijuana (which he was cleared of) but was cited for not having a license to drive a moped and not stopping at a red light, decided to record the incident and place it on SoundCloud, then took his frustrations out against the Police Department about how he was treated on-air during the "Rich & McClain" program with co-host Dawn McClain the same day (November 14) after it happened; Deaver would exit the station a week later.
14	The Dallas-Ft.Worth market sees two stations flip to Classic Hip-Hop within an hour of each other: KLIF-FM, which just relaunched its Top 40/CHR format in October, was the first to flip, followed an hour later by Urban AC KSOC, who became the third Radio One outlet to adopt the "Boom" brand. KLIF-FM would later flip to Hip-Hop/R&B full-time December 2, giving the market three outlet in this genre, joining KKDA-FM and KBFB; However it would shift to Rhythmic in February 2015.
17	Another Dallas-Ft.Worth station makes major changes, as KFXR drops brokered programming and concentrates on Talk full-time.
17	After one year with Rhythmic AC, KWNZ/Reno shifts to Top 40/CHR, joining Mainstream rival KLCA and Rhythmic KWYL in the market's Top 40 battle.
18	St. Louis becomes the latest market to pick up a Classic Hip-Hop outlet, as iHeartMedia's KMJM-FM drops Urban AC for "100.3 The Beat," which was the same moniker it used when it was a R&B/Hip-Hop outlet from 1999 to 2009.
20/25	Within the course of five days, Atlanta picks up 3 Classic Hip-Hop outlets. On November 20, WTZA & W257DF made the shift from Urban Oldies, but would later be joined by former Top 40/CHR WWWQ-HD2 ("OG 97.9"; OG referring to "Original Gangsta") and WAMJ-HD2 & W275BK ("Boom 102.9") on November 25.
21	Family Radio announces that it is acquiring WQEW/New York City from Radio Disney for $12.95 million. The deal brings the religious broadcaster back the market after two years, as they have desired to purchase an AM radio outlet.
21	Another iHeartMedia-owned Urban AC, WSOL-FM/Jacksonville, becomes the latest Classic Hip-Hop convert.
25	Urban AC WCFB/Orlando is the latest Classic Hip-Hop convert. However, after two weeks, it readded Urban AC currents and recurrents, although the gold Hip-Hop product continues to be played on the station.

=== December ===
Date	Event
1	iHeartMedia pulls the plug on another "Brew"-branded Classic Rocker, as WBWR/Columbus (Ohio) picks up the Alternative format that was previously programmed at sister station WCGX prior to its flip to Hip-Hop/R&B in September.
2	WEZY/Racine, Wisconsin, drops AC for Country and changes call letters to WMKQ to match its "Q92.1" moniker. The flip also puts the station in sync with Country sister WBWI-FM/West Bend, as both outlets target the Milwaukee market as rimshots (WMKQ from the southern portion, WBWI-FM the northern and western portion) as well as taking on the already established WMIL-FM (which covers the entire market).
3	Larry Elder and KABC/Los Angeles part ways after 20 years. Elder will continue his program online.
4	WHFS-FM/Tampa drops their Sports format after two years and a change in ownership, and along with it releases the entire airstaff; currently stunting with Christmas music, the station will flip to a new format in January 2015, which is when Bubba The Love Sponge's contract with Cox Media expires, as he is expected to anchor a morning slot upon its launch.
8	Entercom announces that it is purchasing Lincoln Financial Group's entire 15-station lineup in a $106.5 million deal, and will operate the outlets under a LMA deal until the sale is approved by the FCC. The sale also expand Entercom's market portfolio to three more markets (Atlanta, San Diego, and Miami), while at the same time increases its cluster lineup in Denver, but because of FCC rules they will divest Sports KKFN to a third party trust as they can have only 5 FMs and 3 AMs due to both companies having 3 FMs apiece in the market. The purchase also ends LFG's tenure in radio which dates back to its predecessor Jefferson-Pilot Communications.
12	After the closing of the sale of the station from E.W. Scripps to Envision Broadcasting Network, Classic Country KKGQ/Wichita starts stunting with construction noises, followed three days later by Christmas music, then shifts to random musical genres on the 26th. The station flipped to Rhythmic AC on January 1, 2015.
19	Univision bring the Classic Hip-Hop format to San Antonio, as Spanish Top 40 KGSX becomes the latest convert. The station also changes call letters to KMYO to match the "YO 95.1" handle.
19	Cumulus Media flips another station, Adult Top 40 WRWM/Indianapolis, to the Classic Hip-Hop format, this after launching with a weekend-themed event similar to sister station KLIF-FM in Dallas did back in November.
24	After nine months with Classic Alternative (and poor ratings), KXDE/Denver drops the format and gives the market an early Christmas present: Classic Hip-Hop as "Fly 107.1." This will be the third format KXDE had this year.
25	WZTI/Milwaukee flips to Gold-based Rhythmic AC as "100.3 The Party."
25	iHeartMedia Country WBUL/Lexington's HD2 sub channel and FM translator is launched with Classic Country, billed as "Bull Icons 98.5." The launch puts the station in direct competition with Cumulus Media's recently launched Nash Icons convert WVLK-FM.
26	Former News/Talk simulcasts WNLS & W232BO/Tallahassee flipped to AC as "My 94.3."
26	KISO/Omaha's HD2 subchannel launches an Active Rock format, which is being simulcast on two FM translators at 94.9 and 102.3. The station, billed as "Rock 94.9/102.3," will take on the more established KEZO.
26	The Smooth Jazz format returns to Chicago, as "Groove 103.9" (the on air moniker of WTMX-HD2 and W280EM) debuts.
26	WSWT/Peoria relaunches its AC format as "Mix 106.9", dropping all-80s music on weekends, but retaining the Christmas music played during the holiday season.
26	KMXR/Corpus Christi relaunches its Classic Hits format, rebranding as "Big 93.9" with an emphasis on music from the 70s and 80s.
26	WERK/Muncie, Indiana, also adjusts their Classic Hits format, as it scale back the 60s and 70s product and places more emphasis on the 80s.
26	WKSA/Norfolk and its Urban AC format is replaced with "Missy FM," featuring music from local native Missy Elliott, who is also doing the voice overs and imaging. The station flipped to Classic Hip-Hop and relaunched its previous "92.1 The Beat" moniker on January 5, 2015.
26	Just 14 months after it was dropped in favor of Classic Rock on a previous FM translator, Bluewater Broadcasting brings the Classic Hip-Hop format back to Montgomery, where it replaces the Soft AC format that was carried on WQKS-HD2 & W263BX.
29	KLOE/Goodland, Kansas, shifts from a hybrid Classic Hits/News/Talk/Farm presentation to a traditional News/Talk direction.
29	The Attorney General of California has launched an audit and financial investigation into the practices of the Pacifica Foundation, citing failures to comply with California law governing nonprofit foundations. The investigation adds to turmoil that has affected the non-profit group, including internal troubles at their 6 radio stations, the firing of Executive Director Summer Reese in March, and the Corporation for Public Broadcasting's decision to withhold funding due to insufficient accounting practices that date back to 2012.
30	KVNA-FM/Flagstaff, Arizona, flips to adult album alternative and moves the AC format to its AM sister and FM translator, the latter replacing its News/Talk/Sports format.
30	Killer Radio leaves WMMT-FM for WLZD-LP. Jon Colwell also quietly steps down as co-host after a two-year tenure with the show.
31	WJXR/Jacksonville's 30-year run as a Home Shopping radio outlet comes to an end as it flips to Spanish Tropical under new owners.
31	WHFS/Tampa drops their Sports format (and along with it, its affiliation with CBS Sports Radio) and begins simulcasting the Business News format from sister station WSBR/Miami.

== Debuts ==
Date	Event
January 22	CBS Radio alternative KXTE/Las Vegas launches a HD2 dance sub channel called "SIN107.5." The station joins WPGC/Washington, D.C., WBBM/Chicago, KSFM/Sacramento, KKHH/Houston and KMVQ-FM/San Francisco in having locally based full-time dance formats on HD2 subcarriers.
February 5	After being off the air for nearly a year, WUUU/Covington, Louisiana, returns with a top 40/CHR format serving the Northshore Parishes between Baton Rouge and New Orleans
February 22	WLML/West Palm Beach signs on with an adult standards format.
February 24	KDIS-FM/Little Rock, which left the air in August 2013 after The Walt Disney Company placed the outlet on the selling block, is relaunched with a Christian talk format under new owners Salem Communications.
March 11	WKAL/Rome, New York, returns to the air.
April 22	KHIC/Keno, Oregon, signs on the air with a top 40/CHR format serving the Klamath Falls area.
April 25	CHPK-FM/Calgary was scheduled to debut with an adult album alternative format.
June 13	Active Rock KCCR/Blunt, South Dakota, signs on, targeting the Pierre area
July 17	Sirius XM Radio was scheduled to launch two new channels on this date: Venus, a format focusing on rhythmic pop hits, and Y2Kountry, with emphasis on country artists from the 2000s
October 3	All India Radio begins broadcasting the monthly programmee Mann Ki Baat presented by the country's Prime Minister, Narendra Modi.
November 7	CKMO/Orangeville, Ontario, signs on with Christmas Music. On December 26, the station debuts with AC as "101.5 MyFM," targeting the Orangeville area instead of nearby Toronto.
December 11	KNHK-FM/Spokane signs on with Classic Country as "104.5 Hank FM."

== Closings ==
Date	Event
January 1	WEIC/1270-Charleston, Illinois, ceases broadcasting at 00:01 Central Standard Time after 59 years of broadcasting.
January 31	Billboard's top 40 update newsletter publishes its last issue after two years.
February 11	Radio Disney affiliate WOLF/Syracuse signs off the air temporarily until a new format is launched
February 28	Family Radio's KARR/Seattle goes dark after losing its lease on their transmitter site that will now be part of a redevelopment project being planned in the suburb of KARR's COL, Kirkland.
March 29	After a career that spanned 44 years, WMJI/Cleveland personality John Lanigan retires. Lanigan, who had been WMJI's morning host since 1985, started out in 1970 as a replacement for Don Imus at WGAR and remained at that station until 1983, when he left to do a short radio stint in Tampa.
April 1	WALE/990-Greenville, Rhode Island, loses its license after it is not renewed.
April 7	Rhythmic top 40 KGZG-FM/Spokane signs off the air, in part to Gonzaga University filing a trademark lawsuit against owner Jamie Pendleton, who is accused of using Gonzaga-related images, including its mascot Spike, to promote his businesses without permission.
April 11	Southeast Missouri State University announces that it would close its college radio station, KDMC-LP/Cape Girardeau, following changes to its mass media curriculum to eliminate radio courses and emphasize multimedia journalism. Some of the station's programming will continue online; KDMC's studios will also be repurposed to provide student-produced news content for sister NPR station KRCU and the Arrow student newspaper.
April 28	The Artie Lange Show ends its three-year run on both radio syndication and television.
April 30	After 80 years on the air, WHNK/Parkersburg, West Virginia, signs off the air. The station, which originally signed on the air as WPAR at 1420 on July 11, 1935, before moving to 1450kc. in 1941, was the oldest radio station in the Parkersburg radio market.
May 13	After 55 years, 14,144 shows and 32,397 guests, KXIC/Iowa City, Iowa, air personality Dottie Ray retires from radio with her last broadcast.
May 16	Randi Rhodes ends her syndicated talk show. The decision came from Rhodes herself, which comes just after she agreed to a new contract extension with Premiere Networks in November 2013.
May 23	Ed Schultz ends his syndicated talk show to focus on his MSNBC program.
June 1	After 35 years WOR/New York City cancels Joan Hamburg's consumer affairs program.
June 29	After five years of providing an interactive user-controlled social media music platform to radio stations, Jelli ceases operations and turns its focus to selling advertising through the services of co-owned Radiospot.
June 30	Westwood One, the service's syndicator, ends its distribution of the True Oldies Channel. The network, created by radio personality Scott Shannon (who left Westwood One parent company Cumulus Media in February), is set to be replaced by a revival of the former Jones Radio Networks brand, "Good Time Oldies."
July 16	Sirius XM Radio discontinues the on-air broadcasting of Top 20 on 20 and Sirius XM Pops. Top 20 on 20 will move to Sirius XM's internet-only package, while Sirius XM Pops merges into sister channel Symphony Hall on July 17.
August 3	24/7 Comedy ceases terrestrial distribution and move to iHeartRadio.
August 8	KJR-FM/Seattle morning host Bob Rivers retires, ending his 25-year run on Seattle radio on the same day he joined KISW in 1989.
October 31	KFNS/St. Louis goes off the air after the station stops paying its bills, resulting in Ameren turning off the power to its transmitter site. Following the shutdown, station owner Grand Slam Sports announced that the company would focus on sister station KXFN and sell KFNS to an undisclosed religious group. KFNS had featured a sports radio format since 1993 (except for a period starting in 2013 when the format shifted to hot talk), but since 2009 had faced increased competition for the sports radio audience in St. Louis from WXOS, WGNU, and WQQX.
November 19	iHeartMedia announces that will cease operations on its satellite services effective immediately.
December 15	Westwood One will cease operations of NBC News Radio. The moves comes after Westwood One announced a partnership with CNN to launch an in-house news network and the ending of its distribution of ABC Radio, which is being relaunched in 2015.
December 17/22	After a 33-year run, Westwood One will end production on Rockline, with the Classic Rock edition airing its final show on December 17, and the Active Rock edition making its final broadcast on December 22.
December 17	Terry Dorsey's 33-year run as a morning host on Dallas-Ft. Worth radio at both KPLX and later at sister KSCS (the longest tenure in the market's FM history) will come to an end as he retires on this date
December 31	Wall Street Journal Radio Network will cease operations.
December 31	Tribune Media will end its leased Sports format on WGWG-LP/Chicago after eleven months.
December 31	Buckley Broadcasting's remaining property, ESPN Radio affiliate KIDD/Monterey, California, signs off the air, citing financial problems. The towers at Reservation Road and Seaside Court in Monterey will be dismantled and Buckley will put the frequency up for sale instead of turning in its license.

== Deaths ==
- January 17: Larry Monroe, 71. 29-year veteran with KUT radio in Austin, Texas
- February 6: Ralph Kiner, 91. Radio and television commentator for the New York Mets.
- February 15: Angelo Henderson, 51. Radio host at WCHB and minister.
- February 25: Jim Lange, 81. Radio host (KGO, KFRC, KABL and KSFO/San Francisco, KMPC/Los Angeles, KKSJ/San Jose) and TV host.
- March 1: Porky Chedwick, 96. Longtime Pittsburgh-area rhythm and blues radio host.
- March 5: Geoff Edwards, 83. Radio host (KFMB, KFI, KMPC, KSUR) and TV host.
- March 25: Ralph Wilson, 95. Radio station owner in the 1950s and 1960s; better known for his ownership of the Buffalo Bills in his later years.
- April 6: Mickey Rooney, 93. Star of the radio series Shorty Bell and The Hardy Family.
- April 11: Michael Hightower, 58. Radio personality in the Milwaukee radio market (was evening host at WJMR-FM until his death; alumni of WNOV, WAWA, WMCS, WLUM-FM and WKKV-FM)
- April 27: Dr. Jack Ramsay, 89. Former basketball coach, later radio and television analyst (best known in radio for his work on ESPN Radio)
- May 3: Ben Hoberman, 92. Radio executive (developer of talk format for KABC/Los Angeles, president of ABC Radio)
- May 4: Wild Bill Scott, 68. Founder of Z Rock.
- May 28: Dave Herman, 78. Disc jockey at several stations in the New York/New Jersey area.
- June 1: Tom Rounds, 77. Founder of Radio Express and co-founder of American Top 40.
- June 15: Casey Kasem, 82. Co-founder and host of American Top 40 and its spin-offs from 1970 to 2009, radio and television voice-over artist.
- June 30: Bob Hastings, 89. American radio, film, and television character actor.
- July 4: Richard Mellon Scaife, 82. Media mogul; longtime co-owner of KQV/Pittsburgh.
- July 7: Dick Jones, 87. Voice of Henry Aldrich on the hit radio drama The Aldrich Family from 1943 to 1944.
- July 28: Margot Adler, 68. Correspondent for NPR.
- August 11: Robin Williams, 63. American actor/comedian who portrayed radio disc jockey Adrian Cronauer in the 1987 film Good Morning, Vietnam
- August 12: Lauren Bacall, 88. Star of the radio series Bold Venture.
- August 19: Don Pardo, 96. Radio and television announcer who spent 70 years as an in-house announcer for NBC Radio and Television.
- August 21: Gerry Anderson, 69. Northern Irish radio broadcaster
- October 3: Kevin Metheny, 60. Radio executive (Clear Channel) and programmer (notably with WNBC/New York City, WGN/Chicago, and, at the time of his death, KGO & KSFO/San Francisco)
- October 6: Bill Campbell, 91. Philadelphia-area sportscaster and radio personality with WIP, WCAU, and KYW.
- October 21: Dale Dorman, 71. Disc jockey best known for his long run on Boston radio (WRKO, WXKS-FM, and WODS) from 1968 to 2010; member of Rock and Roll Hall of Fame.
- November 3: Tom Magliozzi, 77. Auto mechanic and comedian; best known as "Click Tappet," co-host of Car Talk with Click and Clack.
