= WGL =

WGL may refer to:

- WGL, the original (1927–1928) call sign of the New York City radio station that has since evolved into WADO
- WGL (AM), a radio station (1250 AM) licensed to Fort Wayne, Indiana
- WGL (software) a window management interface for OpenGL on Windows platforms
- WGL-FM, a former (2007-2014) call sign of a radio station (102.9 FM) licensed to Huntington, Indiana, which was changed to WJCI
- WGL Holdings or its subsidiary, the Washington Gas Light Company.
- Warragul railway station, Australia
- Windows Glyph List 4
- Warren, Gorham & Lamont, an American publisher owned by Thomson Reuters
