= WIOE =

WIOE may refer to:

- WIOE (AM), a radio station (1450 AM) licensed to serve Fort Wayne, Indiana, United States
- WIOE-FM, a radio station (101.1 FM) licensed to serve South Whitley, Indiana
