= WMYQ =

WMYQ may refer to:

- WMYQ (FM), a radio station (93.1 FM) licensed to serve Shaw, Mississippi, United States; see List of radio stations in Mississippi
- WKXG (FM), a radio station (92.7 FM) licensed to serve Moorhead, Mississippi, which held the call sign WMYQ from 2016 to 2022
- WIOE-FM, a radio station (101.1 FM) licensed to serve South Whitley, Indiana which held the call sign WMYQ in from 2008 to 2015
- WJNA (FM), a radio station (96.7 FM) licensed to serve Westminster, South Carolina, United States, which held the call sign WMYQ in 2016
- WMYQ, a radio station (96.3 FM) licensed to Miami, Florida, United States, which held the call sigh WMYQ from 1972 to 1979
