= WSHI =

WSHI may refer to:

- WSHI-LP, a radio station (98.5 FM) licensed to Shelbyville, Indiana
- WRDF, a radio station (106.3 FM) licensed to Columbia City, Indiana which held the call sign WSHI from 1997 to 2004
