= Chrome Cats =

American hip hop group

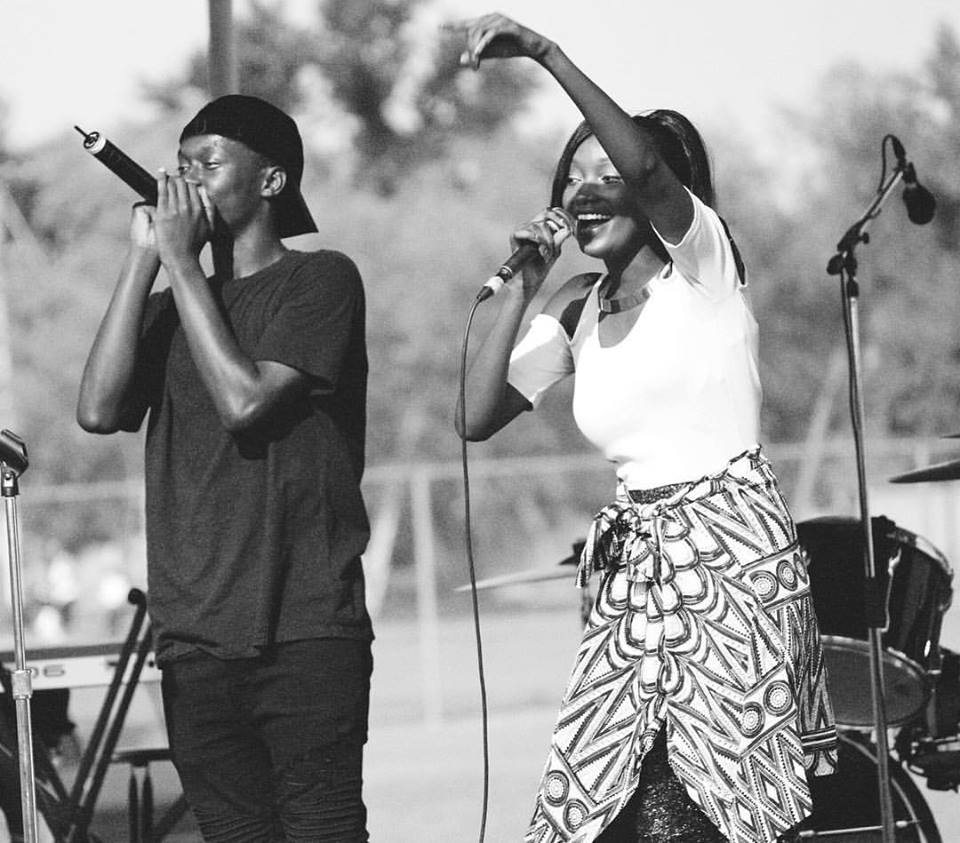
- Chrome Cats performing in 2016

Background information
- Origin: Vallejo, California, U.S.
- Genres: Hip hop, pop
- Years active: 2010–present
- Labels: Independent (current); Lakefront (former)
- Members: KJ; Jamila
- Website: chromecats.com

Chrome Cats are an American brother-and-sister hip hop/pop duo, consisting of Jamila Sims (born February 20, 1997) and Korland "KJ" Sims (born May 19, 1994).

== Early life ==
Korland and Jamila Sims were born and raised in Vallejo, California. They attended both elementary and middle school there. In 2009, the siblings later moved to Fort Wayne, Indiana where they currently reside. They are both of Kenyan American descent as their mother is from Kenya and their father is from Indiana. The siblings got into writing and recording music as a hobby in summer 2006 when their mother suggested it as something they could do to pass time. They had both attended hip hop dance classes and were fond of hip hop music. The duo stated positive vibes in their lives play a big role behind the message of their music, in an interview with radio station WNHT.

== Music career ==
The duo gained the majority of their following through YouTube and caught the eye of Malaysian independent label LakeFront Records in 2010. Chrome Cats signed with LakeFront Records in October 2010. Chrome Cats signing with LakeFront made them the first U.S. musicians ever to be signed to a Malaysian label. In 2011, the duo was featured on Music Connection as one of the top 25 artists signed that year. Chrome Cats then released an EP titled Rise in January 2011 which was featured on Delta and Continental's in-flight entertainment. In August 2012, Chrome Cats entered the Billboard charts for three weeks straight for the single "DNA of a Winner" which charted at number 42. On November 4, 2013, the duo released the video for the single "Best Life" which charted at number 36 on the Billboard charts in late January 2014. On January 22, 2015, the duo premiered the music video for their single "Worth It". On August 11, 2016, the duo released a music video for the single "We'll Be Fine" independently on Vevo. On September 13, 2018, the duo released the music video "Trouble" on Vevo.

== Discography ==
- Rise EP (2010)
- Flight to Paradise (2013)
