= WLQZ-LP =

- Warsaw, Indiana; United States
- Broadcast area: Metro Warsaw
- Frequency: 93.9 MHz
- Branding: Z93.9

Programming
- Format: Contemporary hits, high school sports

Ownership
- Owner: Blessed Beginnings

History
- First air date: September 11, 2003
- Former call signs: WIOE-LP (2002–2015); WLQZ-LP (2015); WIOE-LP (2015)
- Former frequencies: 98.3 MHz (2003–2015)

Technical information
- Licensing authority: FCC
- Facility ID: 123939
- Class: L1
- ERP: 100 watts
- HAAT: 23.8 meters (78 ft)
- Transmitter coordinates: 41°15′2.34″N 85°51′12.53″W

Links
- Public license information: LMS
- Website: wlqz939.com

WLQZ-LP is a broadcast radio station licensed to and serving Warsaw, Indiana, United States. As of June 2015, the station is on the air with a format of Top 40 music as Z93.9, Warsaw's Hit Music Station. WLQZ-LP is owned and operated by Blessed Beginnings.

== From LPFM to commercial ==
At 12:00 am on Friday, March 6, 2015, the Oldies, Classic Hits, and Classic Top 40 of LPFM station WIOE-LP moved to commercial WMYQ. WIOE-LP fell silent with the frequency change.

The station changed its call sign to WLQZ-LP on April 20, 2015, back to WIOE-LP on July 2, 2015, and back to WLQZ-LP again on July 10, 2015.
