= WGLL =

Coordinates: 41°20′1.2″N 85°3′7.9″W

- Auburn, Indiana; United States
- Broadcast area: Auburn, Indiana; Avilla, Indiana; Butler, Indiana
- Frequency: 1570 kHz

Programming
- Format: Religious
- Affiliations: 3ABN Radio

Ownership
- Owner: Moore Foundation

History
- First air date: November 27, 1968 (first license granted, as WIFF)
- Former call signs: WIFF (1968–1997)
- Call sign meaning: former simulcast of WGL

Technical information
- Licensing authority: FCC
- Facility ID: 8076
- Class: D
- Power: 500 watts (daytime); 151 watts (nighttime)
- Translator: 103.1 W276DM (Auburn)

Links
- Public license information: Public file; LMS
- Website: wgllradio.wixsite.com/home

WGLL is an AM radio station located in Auburn, Indiana, transmitting on 1570 kHz with 500 watts during the daylight hours and 151 watts during the nighttime hours. The WGLL transmitter and its two towers are located along County Road 29 in Auburn, Indiana.

== History ==
The station originally signed on the air on 1570 kHz as WIFF on September 3, 1968. WIFF was owned by Frank Kovas of Kovas Communications. The station's call sign was changed to WGLL on March 31, 1997; at this point, the station became a simulcast of WGL in Fort Wayne. WGLL signed off the air on October 3, 2002. On February 21, 2003, Frank Kovas donated the station to the Raymond S. and Dorothy N. Moore Foundation, along with his other remaining station W07CL. Due to his failing health, Kovas had already sold his other stations in the years preceding this. WGLL signed back on under the new management on April 14, 2003.

== Management ==
The station is currently managed on behalf of the Moore Foundation by Ray Alexander. Alexander is a personal friend of Raymond Moore, and has helped launch a number of other ministries. The sister stations W07CL and WFWC-CD are also managed by Alexander. Although the station is owned by the Moore Foundation, it does not receive monetary support from them. WGLL is supported solely by local donations. With the lack of funding and local interest, the station had been declining rapidly over the past decade.

== Programming ==
The current programming consists of a rebroadcast from a religious satellite feed 24 hours a day. Currently, no live personnel are on staff at the station.
