= WOOL (FM) =

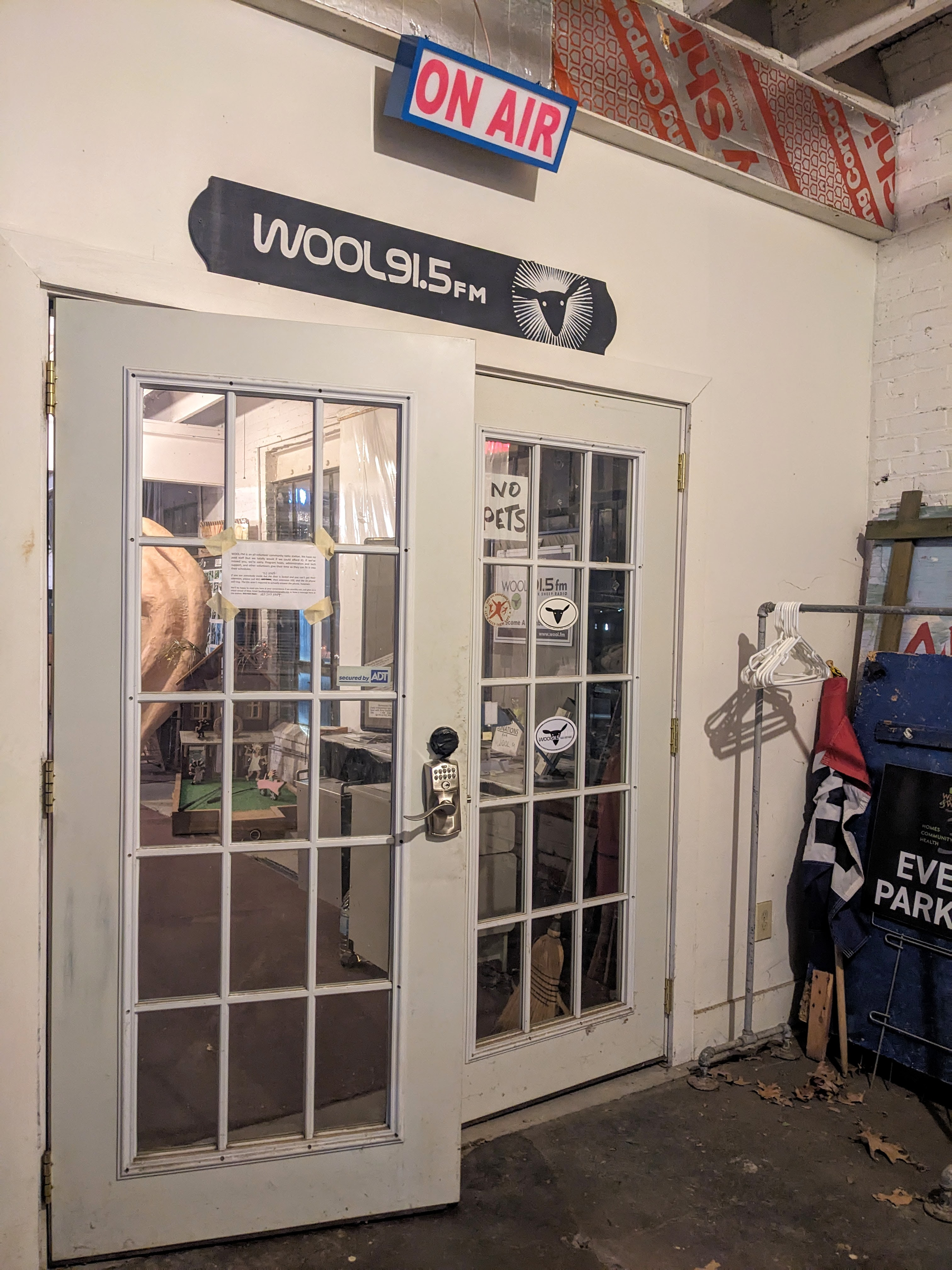
- WOOL studios at 33 Bridge Street in Bellows Falls
- Bellows Falls, Vermont; United States
- Frequency: 91.5 MHz
- Branding: Black Sheep Radio

Programming
- Format: Freeform
- Affiliations: Pacifica Radio

Ownership
- Owner: Great Falls Community Broadcasting Company

History
- First air date: June 25, 2005, as a low-power station; March 9, 2014, on its current license
- Former call signs: WOOL-LP (2005–2014, as a low-power FM station)
- Former frequencies: 100.1 MHz (2005–2014)
- Call sign meaning: "Wool" refers to the sheep's coat, hence the branding

Technical information
- Licensing authority: FCC
- Facility ID: 174862
- Class: A
- ERP: 550 watts
- HAAT: 118 meters (387 ft)
- Transmitter coordinates: 43°8′14.2″N 72°25′57.3″W

Links
- Public license information: Public file; LMS
- Webcast: Listen live
- Website: blacksheepradio.org

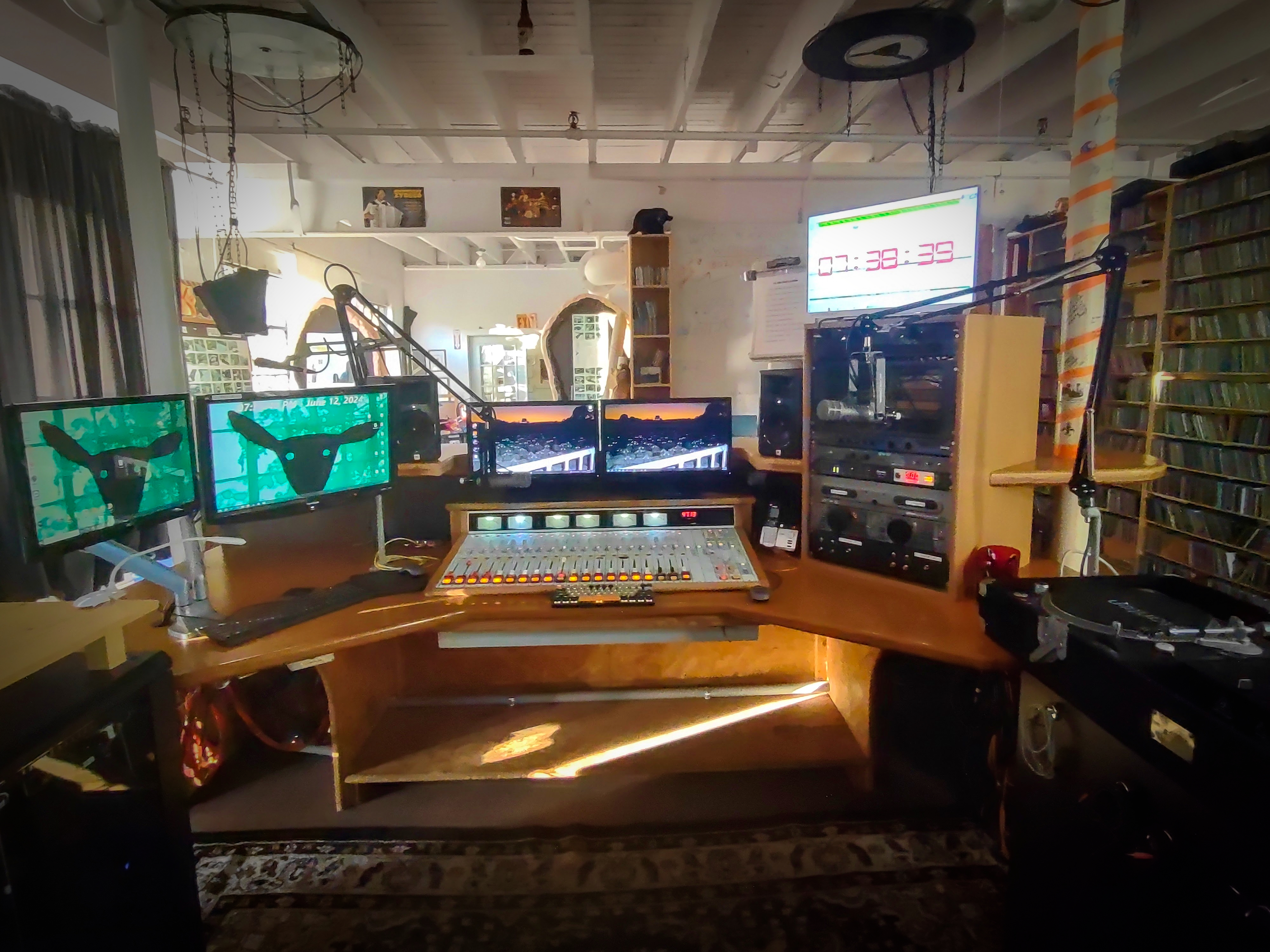
Studio "A" at WOOL.fm community radio

WOOL (91.5 FM, "Black Sheep Radio") is a Community radio station broadcasting a freeform music and talk format. Licensed to Bellows Falls, Vermont, United States, the station is owned by Great Falls Community Broadcasting Company.

Four years after an initial application and a year and a half after construction was approved, WOOL began broadcasting as a low-power FM radio station in June 2005, bringing freeform radio programming to the area around Bellows Falls. The station upgraded from low-power to a full-service license in 2014, expanding its coverage area.

== History ==
In June 2001, the Great Falls Community Broadcasting Company applied to bring a low-power FM radio station to Bellows Falls; one of its board members was record producer Gary Smith. The Federal Communications Commission (FCC) granted the construction permit for 100.1 MHz in February 2004. Taking the name "Black Sheep Radio" and the call sign WOOL-LP, the group began fundraising to defray the costs of station construction and searching for a tower site. Studio space in a building on Canal Street, as well as utility costs, were donated by telecommunications company SoVerNet. By late 2004, the station had selected a tower owned by cable company Adelphia on Fall Mountain (across the Connecticut River in Walpole, New Hampshire) for its transmitter, though it still needed to raise money to pay the site lease as well as purchase Emergency Alert System equipment. By March 2005, the station had switched from the Canal Street studio location to one on Bridge Street which required less investment to renovate.

WOOL-LP began broadcasting on June 25, 2005, featuring a freeform format. At the time, the station had some 140 members and 20 volunteer DJs; when local programming was not on air, Pacifica Radio programs were heard. The first 24 hours of WOOL's programming was dedicated to the pirate Radio Free Brattleboro in nearby Brattleboro, which had been shut down by the FCC just days before WOOL-LP debuted.

In 2007, Great Falls Community Broadcasting Company filed for a full-service—and higher-power—facility when the FCC opened up a window for new non-commercial educational stations. The FCC granted the construction permit in August 2010; the station barely made the deadline to complete the facility, beginning broadcasting on the higher-power facility on March 9, 2014. The new signal expanded WOOL's reach in Vermont and New Hampshire to include towns such as Grafton, Chester, and Claremont. Funding for the project was provided by the selectboard of Rockingham, Vermont.

== See also ==
- List of community radio stations in the United States
