= WXKE =

Coordinates: 41.1037°N 85.1789°W

Churubusco, Indiana; United States
- Broadcast area: Fort Wayne, Indiana
- Frequency: 96.3 MHz
- Branding: 96.3 XKE

Programming
- Format: Classic rock
- Affiliations: United Stations Radio Networks

Ownership
- Owner: Adams Radio Group; (ARG of Fort Wayne LLC)
- Sister stations: WBTU, WJFX, WWFW

History
- First air date: April 1994 (as WKQM)
- Former call signs: WKQM (1991–1995); WEJE (1995–2001); WWWD (2001–2002); WHTD (2/2002-7/2002); WNHT (2002–2014)

Technical information
- Licensing authority: FCC
- Facility ID: 22287
- Class: B1
- ERP: 6,700 watts
- HAAT: 169 meters (554 ft)

Links
- Public license information: Public file; LMS
- Webcast: Listen live
- Website: 963xke.com

WXKE (96.3 FM) is a radio station licensed to Churubusco, Indiana and serving the nearby Fort Wayne, Indiana area. The station airs a classic rock format.

== History ==
The station began operations as WKQM in April 1994, featuring an easy listening/adult standards music format. In September 1995, WKQM changed its format to modern rock and adopted the moniker "The Edge". with new call sign WEJE. "The Edge" was consulted by noted rock radio consultant Fred Jacobs, but after Jacobs Media and WEJE parted ways in January 1998, WEJE rebranded as "Extreme 96.3".

In March 2001, the "Extreme" format and WEJE call sign moved to 102.3 FM in Auburn, Indiana (now WGBJ), and on March 12, 2001, 96.3 debuted a new country music format as WWWD, originally tagged "Big Red Country" but then changed to "Red Hot Country" after Artistic Media Partners notified 96.3's then-owner, Frank Kovas, that the name "Big Red Country" was already service-marked for their station in Ellettsville.

On March 1, 2002, following Kovas' sale of his stations to Travis Broadcasting Corporation the previous December, "Red Hot Country" was blown up in favor of WHTD "Hits 96", a CHR/Pop station. On April 5, 2004, after stunting with "Wild Thing" by Tone Loc for a day, 96.3 flipped to an urban-leaning Rhythmic CHR format, branded as "Wild 96.3", and changed its call sign to WNHT. The station was purchased by Summit City Radio Group in July 2004.

In March 2014, Adams Radio Group entered an agreement to purchase Summit City's cluster (which includes WNHT). Days later, Adams announced they would purchase Oasis Radio Group's stations. To meet ownership limits, Adams will retain WNHT, WGL and WXKE, as well as acquiring Oasis Radio Group's WJFX and WBTU, while selling off WHPP to Fort Wayne Catholic Radio, and selling WGL-FM to Calvary Radio Network. WLYV and two translators (on 96.9 FM and 103.3 FM) will also be acquired by Adams. The purchase, at a price of $6.4 million, was consummated on June 2, 2014. As a result, Adams plans on massive format restructuring. WNHT's entire airstaff were released on May 30, leading to rumors of a format change. On June 2, Adams announced that WXKE will move to the stronger 96.3 signal on June 11. At first, WNHT's format was speculated to move to the 96.9 FM translator, but on June 5, the station announced via Facebook that its format will be merged into WJFX, a top 40 station that had previously been formatted as urban contemporary and rhythmic contemporary. On June 13, 2014, the station took on the WXKE call sign.

Effective June 9, 2023, Adams Radio Group's portfolio of eighteen stations and translators, including WXKE, was sold for $12.6 million.
