= WJCI =

Coordinates: 40°55′33.2″N 85°23′14.9″W

Huntington, Indiana; United States
- Broadcast area: Fort Wayne, Indiana
- Frequency: 102.9 MHz
- Branding: The Calvary Radio Network

Programming
- Format: Christian radio

Ownership
- Owner: Calvary Radio Network, Inc.

History
- First air date: September 1, 1965 (as WHLT-FM at 103.1)
- Former call signs: WHLT-FM (1965–1980); WHUZ (1980–1985); WIOE (1985–1988); WOWO-FM (1988–1994); WEXI (1994–2002); WYLT (10/10/2002-10/21/2002); WXKE (2002–2006); WWGL (2006–2007); WGL-FM (2007–2014)
- Former frequencies: 103.1 MHz (1965–1995)
- Call sign meaning: Jesus Christ

Technical information
- Licensing authority: FCC
- Facility ID: 28206
- Class: A
- ERP: 4,700 watts
- HAAT: 91 meters (299 ft)

Links
- Public license information: Public file; LMS
- Webcast: Listen live
- Website: jesuspeoplefm.com

WJCI is an FM radio station located in Fort Wayne, Indiana. The station operates on the FM radio frequency of 102.9 MHz. It broadcasts a Christian radio format and is an affiliate of Calvary Radio Network.

== History ==
The station signed on as WHLT-FM on September 1, 1965, originally at 103.1 FM and serving as a simulcast of its AM sister station, WHLT (1300 AM). It changed its call sign to WHUZ on July 10, 1980.

Ed Hughes was the owner/manager of WHUZ from 1979 to 1984, as it operated as a Top 40 station. The station was purchased by Price Communications in 1985, and renamed WIOE "Commercial Free 103", targeting teen listeners in Fort Wayne. After nearly a year of commercial-free operation, the station eventually began running commercials. The station flipped to a simulcast with sister station WOWO in 1988, still on 103.1 and renamed WOWO-FM. Eventually, the frequency was changed to 102.9 FM and the station adopted the call letters WXKE, which had been used for many years on a rock/classic rock format at 103.9 FM. In February 2004, WXKE dropped its simulcast with WXTW and changed formats to adult standards as "The River".

WXKE was purchased, along with its sister stations by the Summit City Radio Group in July 2004. The standards "River" format drifted over to sister WGL and WXKE relaunched as classic hits "Mike-FM". In 2006, the station abandoned its classic hits format and flipped formats to a simulcast of WGL under the call sign WWGL. Within a few months, call letters were changed again to WGL-FM,.

On April 1, 2010, WGL-FM changed its format to hot adult contemporary, branded as "V102.9". WGL (AM) continued broadcasting the "River" standards format as "1250 The River". The simulcast with the AM station returned at 6 a.m on June 3, 2013, when both WGL-FM and WGL switched to an oldies format, including a morning show hosted by former WLYV and WQHK-FM disc jockey Rick Hughes, as well as an afternoon show with Pat White carried over from WGL AM's standards format. As part of the change, Delilah was dropped from the WGL-FM lineup.

In March 2014, Adams Radio Group entered an agreement to purchase Summit City's cluster (which includes WGL AM and FM). Days later, Adams announced they would purchase Oasis Radio Group's stations. To meet ownership limits, Adams retained WNHT, WGL and WXKE, as well as acquiring Oasis Radio Group's WJFX and WBTU, while selling off WHPP to Fort Wayne Catholic Radio, and selling WGL-FM to Calvary Radio Network. WGL-FM dropped the oldies format for Christian programming on June 2, 2014. The last song on Oldies 102.9 was American Pie by Don McLean. On June 11, 2014, 102.9 changed its cal lsign to WJCI. The first song on The Calvary Radio Network was Peace In The Valley by Elvis Presley, introduced by Taylor Swift, who said that Presley is her favorite singer of all time.
