= WWFW =

Coordinates: 41.109°N 85.165°W

- Fort Wayne, Indiana; United States
- Broadcast area: Fort Wayne metro
- Frequency: 103.9 MHz
- Branding: 103.9 Wayne FM

Programming
- Format: Classic Hits

Ownership
- Owner: Adams Radio Group; (ARG of Fort Wayne LLC)
- Sister stations: WBTU; WJFX; WXKE

History
- First air date: May 1, 1976
- Former call signs: WXKE (1976–2002); WYLT (2002–2006); WXKE (2006–2014)
- Call sign meaning: Fort Wayne

Technical information
- Licensing authority: FCC
- Facility ID: 56765
- Class: A
- ERP: 1,600 watts
- HAAT: 140 meters (460 ft)

Links
- Public license information: Public file; LMS
- Webcast: Listen live
- Website: 1039waynefm.com

WWFW (103.9 FM, "Wayne 103.9") is a commercial radio station licensed to Fort Wayne, Indiana, United States. It airs a classic hits format and is owned by the Adams Radio Group. The studios are on Lower Huntington Road in Fort Wayne.

WWFW's transmitter is off Hillegas Road in Fort Wayne, near Interstate 69.

== History ==
=== WXKE, WYLT and WWFW ===
The station signed on the air on May 1, 1976. The original call sign was WXKE. In 1983, a group of 5th grade students from Huntertown Elementary requested that the DJ play "Behind Blue Eyes" by the Who every day for 21 days in a row until the request was finally fulfilled. The group would later be known as the OSGG. For four years, 2002 to 2006, it changed its call sign to WYLT when it aired a "Lite" music format. It returned to its original call sign from 2006 to 2014. The station was owned by Summit City.

In March 2014, the Adams Radio Group entered an agreement to purchase Summit City's cluster (which included WXKE). Days later, Adams announced the company would also purchase the Oasis Radio Group's stations. To meet ownership limits, Adams would retain WNHT 96.3, WGL 1240 and WXKE 103.9, as well as acquiring Oasis Radio Group's WJFX 107.9 and WBTU 93.3. At the same time, it would sell off WHPP 106.3 to Fort Wayne Catholic Radio, and sell WGL-FM 102.9 to the Calvary Radio Network. WLYV 1450 and two translators (on 96.9 FM and 103.3 FM) would also be acquired by Adams. The transaction, at a price of $6.4 million, was consummated on June 2, 2014.

As a result, Adams planned a multi-station format restructuring. On June 2, Adams announced that WXKE would move to the stronger 96.3 signal, displacing WNHT's Rhythmic Contemporary format. The two stations would simulcast for ten days.

=== Soft AC ===
The 103.9 station changed to the current WWFW call sign on June 2, 2014. Later that month, on June 20, 2014, at 10:39 pm, after stunting for an hour and a half with music similar to that of call holding or elevator music, WWFW launched a soft adult contemporary format. It was branded as "The New Soft Rock 103-9". The first song on "Soft Rock" was "Celebration" by Kool and the Gang.

Starting in the fall of 2014, WWFW annually made a seasonal format change to all-Christmas music for much of November and December. The station initially featured a Soft AC lean, but gradually evolved to Mainstream AC during the first year on the air. During the Christmas music stint in November 2016, WWFW dropped the "Soft Rock" branding in favor of "Christmas 103.9". On December 7, the station announced through its Facebook page, that they would rebrand as "103.9 Sunny FM" on the 26th. The change took place at midnight on that date; the first song on Sunny FM was "Faith" by George Michael (serving as a tribute to Michael, as he had died on Christmas Day). The format shifted back to Soft AC by 2018.

=== Variety hits and classic hits ===
On December 18, 2019, WWFW announced that the station would flip to Variety Hits as "103.9 Wayne FM" upon the conclusion of its Christmas music run. At 6 p.m. on December 25, after playing "Merry Christmas Darling" by The Carpenters (bookending the "Sunny" format, as it was also the last Christmas song played before the previous relaunch in 2016), WWFW flipped to "Wayne FM", with Tom Petty and the Heartbreakers' "Mary Jane's Last Dance" being the first song played.

Effective June 9, 2023, Adams Radio Group's portfolio of eighteen stations and translators, including WWFW, was sold for $12.6 million.

On May 13, 2024, WWFW flipped to classic hits, directly competing with similarly formatted WLDE. WWFW's playlist leans more towards pop and dance titles, while WLDE is more classic rock-oriented.
