= WOSO (1030 AM) =

Radio station in San Juan, Puerto Rico

- San Juan, Puerto Rico; Puerto Rico
- Broadcast area: San Juan–Caguas–Guaynabo metropolitan area
- Frequency: 1030 kHz
- Branding: WOSO Radio

Programming
- Affiliations: CBS News Radio; ESPN Radio; Westwood One

Ownership
- Owner: Sherman Broadcasting Corporation

History
- First air date: November 21, 1977; 48 years ago
- Last air date: October 21, 2014; 11 years ago
- Call sign meaning: "Oso" (Spanish for "bear")

Technical information
- Licensing authority: FCC
- Facility ID: 9412
- Class: B
- Power: 10,000 watts unlimited
- Transmitter coordinates: 18°22′7″N 66°15′17″W

Links
- Public license information: Public file; LMS
- Website: Archive of wosoradio.net

WOSO (1030 kHz) was a commercial AM radio station broadcasting an English-language talk radio format. Licensed to San Juan, Puerto Rico, it served the San Juan–Caguas–Guaynabo metropolitan area. The station was owned by Sherman Broadcasting Corporation, with Sherman Wildman as president. It featured local talk and information shows, a weekday tradio program and syndicated programming from CBS News Radio, ESPN Radio and Westwood One.

== History ==
WOSO was launched on November 21, 1977.

WOSO was the only radio station in Puerto Rico that broadcast in English full-time, until the K-LOVE station WCAD was launched in early 2019. (WBMJ is a Christian radio station broadcasting in both English and Spanish.)

During its time on the air, WOSO provided the only English-language news-programming broadcasts in the United States territory of Puerto Rico and invited the few English-fluent politicians to appear on a weekly basis in its programming, notably then Rep. Carmen Yulín Cruz, who later became mayor of the capital city of San Juan, then Sen. Kenneth McClintock, who later became President of the Puerto Rico Senate and Lieutenant Governor and Secretary of State of Puerto Rico, and then Sen. Juan Eugenio Hernández-Mayoral, son of late Gov. Rafael Hernández Colón and uncle of current Resident Commissioner Pablo José Hernández Rivera.

On October 21, 2014, after 37 years broadcasting on 1030 AM, WOSO signed off. The transmitter was vandalized and the Puerto Rico Electric Power Authority was forced to shut down the station. After an initial effort to revive the station as an online stream, nothing further was heard. After more than 10 years off the air, the station's license was cancelled on December 11, 2024, as the station had not properly reported its operating status since July 2020 and had not operated at all since August 2021. The call sign was quickly requested by WTIL in Mayaguez.

== Ownership ==
In 1993, Sherman Wildman purchased WOSO for a reported sale price of $1.2 million.
