= WRDF =

- Columbia City, Indiana; United States
- Broadcast area: Fort Wayne, Indiana
- Frequency: 106.3 MHz
- Branding: Relevant Radio

Programming
- Format: Catholic radio
- Affiliations: Relevant Radio

Ownership
- Owner: Fort Wayne Catholic Radio Group, Inc.

History
- First air date: October 13, 1968 (original); September 26, 1990 (current)
- Former call signs: WZRQ (1985–1990); WBBE (6/1990-11/1990); WDJB (1990–1997); WSHI (1997–2004); WDDB (2004–2005); WSHY (2005–2007); WVBB (2007–2009); WJOE (2009–2011); WHPP (2011–2014)
- Call sign meaning: W ReDeemer Radio F (previous branding)

Technical information
- Licensing authority: FCC
- Facility ID: 29204
- Class: A
- ERP: 5,600 watts
- HAAT: 103.5 meters
- Transmitter coordinates: 41°12′49.9″N 85°12′04.3″W

Links
- Public license information: Public file; LMS
- Webcast: Listen Live
- Website: relevantradio.com

WRDF (106.3 FM) is a radio station licensed to Columbia City, Indiana located near Fort Wayne, Indiana. The station offers a Catholic radio format branded as "Relevant Radio". The station is owned by Fort Wayne Catholic Radio Group, Inc.

== History and programming ==
The station signed on in October 1968 as WFDT, featuring a MOR music format. After a time as a soft AC station with the WKSY calls, the station changed to CHR/Top 40 in 1985 as WZRQ, and competed against its Top 40 leader WMEE, but financial problems paired with low ratings eventually led to the station going off the air in August 1988.

On September 26, 1990, after stunting with sounds of bees buzzing and a short compilation of other radio stations across the market (including WOWO-FM, WMEE, and its former CHR competitor WZRQ), 106.3 returned to the air as WBBE, known on air as "The Killer Bee, The All-New B-106 FM". The call letters were later changed to WDJB on November 1, 1990. During The Killer Bee era, the station, once again, competed strongly with WMEE for all-hit music listeners in Fort Wayne. At its peak, it was one of the market's most popular radio stations. This format would remain until April 1997.

In April 1997, WDJB flipped to Adult Standards as WSHI ("Sunny 106.3"), featuring Westwood One's standards format. "Sunny" was a ratings success, and featured a local morning show hosted by Fort Wayne radio mainstay Ron Gregory. In 2003, however, owner Shine Broadcasting Services, LLC, announced it was looking to sell WSHI, and in January 2004, dropped the standards format in favor of mainstream adult contemporary. The station was sold to Artistic Media Partners, Inc., that summer. Artistic Media tried to capitalize on the station's Top 40 heritage by changing the calls to WDDB and reviving the "B-106" moniker. Once this proved unsuccessful, the station made another try as "Sunny 106.3", but with new calls WSHY and an updating of the "Sunny" standards format to a mix of '60s and '70s oldies and soft rock, which then evolved into straightforward oldies.

In January 2007, Artistic Media Partners, Inc. agreed to sell WSHY and sister station WBTU (93.3 FM) to entrepreneur Russ Oasis, for $3.8 million. When the deal was made, it flipped formats to Regional Mexican as 106.3 "El Sol" (Sol is Spanish for "sun") under a local marketing agreement that was approved and took effect on March 6, 2007. The following month, Oasis flipped the station to a gold-based Rhythmic Adult Contemporary format, branded as "Vibe 106.3", with an emphasis on Disco and Classic Dance from the 1970s, 1980s and 1990s. The station also adopted the WVBB call letters during this time.

On September 27, 2008, Russ Oasis' Radio Group dropped the Rhythmic AC format in favor of Variety Hits as "106.3 Joe FM". On September 2, 2009, WVBB changed their call letters to WJOE to match the "Joe FM" branding.

On October 14, 2010, WJOE again changed their format, this time to news/talk, branded as "The Truth".

On September 7, 2011, WJOE changed their call letters to WHPP. 7 days later, on September 14 at 6:00 PM, the station dropped its news/talk format for a mainstream urban format with a heavy emphasis on Hip-Hop, branded as "Clickhop.com". The first song on "Clickhop" was "No Hands" by Waka Flocka Flame. However, in 2013, Mediabase placed the station on its Rhythmic reporting panel due to sister station WJFX having shifted to Top 40/CHR and having a playlist that falls more in line with other Rhythmics that concentrate on only Hip-Hop tracks and less time with conventional R&B tracks, similar to WHHH/Indianapolis. Throughout its tenure as "Clickhop.com", it used Listener Driven Radio (LDR) technology to allow listeners to vote on songs on their website in lieu of requests; because of this, the station presented itself as an Internet radio station with an FM frequency. It also employed a few DJs.

On April 3, 2013, at 6:00 PM, the station dropped the Rhythmic format ("Clickhop.com" continues on their website and mobile applications, though this was later discontinued), and flipped to 90's Hits, branded as "Rewind 106.3."

In March 2014, Adams Radio Group entered an agreement to purchase Summit City Radio Group. Days later, Adams announced they would purchase Oasis Radio Group's stations. To meet ownership limits, Adams will retain WNHT, WGL and WXKE, as well as acquiring Oasis Radio Group's WJFX and WBTU, while selling off WHPP to Fort Wayne Catholic Radio Group, Inc., and selling WGL-FM to Calvary Radio Network. WLYV and two translators (on 96.9 FM and 103.3 FM) will also be acquired by Adams. As a result of the sale to Fort Wayne Catholic Radio, WHPP flipped to Catholic talk programming as "Redeemer Radio" at Noon on June 2. The final song on "Rewind" was "Try Again" by Aaliyah.

Redeemer Radio continued to be aired on WLYV until July 4, 2014, which transitioned into "1450 The Patriot" as a talk format.

On September 2, 2014, WHPP changed its call sign to WRDF, to go with the "Redeemer Radio" branding.
