= WBZQ =

Radio station in Huntington, Indiana

Coordinates: 40°52′31.2″N 85°28′26.9″W

Currently silent
- Huntington, Indiana; United States
- Frequency: 1300 (kHz)
- Branding: La Jefa

Programming
- Format: Spanish

Ownership
- Owner: Fifty Seven Media, LLC

History
- First air date: December 19, 1957 (first license granted)
- Former call signs: WHLT (1957–1984); WCER (1984–1999)

Technical information
- Licensing authority: FCC
- Facility ID: 72788
- Class: D
- Power: 500 watts (day); 19 watts (night)
- Translator: (97.7 MHz) W249DS (Huntington)

Links
- Public license information: Public file; LMS

WBZQ is an AM radio station located in Huntington, Indiana. The station operates on the AM radio frequency of 1300 kHz. WBZQ was owned by Larko Communications until 2012, when the station was sold to Fifty Seven Media, LLC, following the death of owner Christopher Larko in 2010.

== Programming ==
Currently, it is silent, but last broadcast Spanish language programming. Previously, the station had an oldies format.
