= WIOE-FM =

Radio station in South Whitley, Indiana

- South Whitley, Indiana; United States
- Broadcast area: North Eastern Indiana; North Central Indiana
- Frequency: 101.1 MHz
- Branding: Oldies 101.1, 104.3 & Stereo 1450 WIOE

Programming
- Format: Oldies; classic hits; classic top 40

Ownership
- Owner: Brian R. Walsh
- Sister stations: WGL, WIOE

History
- First air date: December 2, 1992
- Former call signs: WQBX (1989); WLZQ (1989–2008); WMYQ (2008–2015); WIOE (2015–2019)
- Call sign meaning: "Warsaw's Independently Owned Entertainment"

Technical information
- Licensing authority: FCC
- Facility ID: 36577
- Class: A
- ERP: 6,000 watts
- HAAT: 100 meters (330 ft)
- Transmitter coordinates: 41°5′58.0″N 85°43′29.0″W
- Repeater: 1450 WIOE (Fort Wayne)

Links
- Public license information: Public file; LMS
- Webcast: Listen live
- Website: WIOE-FM Online

WIOE-FM (101.1 FM) is an oldies, classic hits, and classic top 40 formatted broadcast radio station licensed to South Whitley, Indiana, and serving Whitley, Kosciusko, Wabash, and Huntington counties in Indiana. WIOE-FM is owned and operated by Brian R. Walsh.

== Programming ==
WIOE-FM features both professional announcers and student broadcasters from Warsaw Community High School. Warsaw Community High School athletics are also heard on the station.

WIOE-FM's news department prepares and broadcasts local news reports on the weekdays. The station also broadcasts the Sunday services of the First United Methodist Church located in Warsaw.

== Sale of station ==
At 12:00 a.m. on Friday, March 6, 2015, the oldies, classic hits, and Classic Top 40 format of LPFM station WIOE-LP moved to commercial WMYQ. WIOE-LP fell silent with the frequency change.

On March 30, 2015, former WIOE-LP co-owner Brian R. Walsh purchased WMYQ from Larko Communications, Inc. for $220,000. Walsh entered into a time brokerage agreement with Larko Communications, Inc. on March 6, 2015, in order to begin operating the station.

The sale of WMYQ closed on August 5, 2015. The station's callsign was changed from WMYQ to WIOE on August 19, 2015, and then to WIOE-FM on July 30, 2019.
