= WBTU =

Radio station in Kendallville, Indiana

Coordinates: 41.361°N 85.079°W

- Kendallville, Indiana; United States
- Broadcast area: Metropolitan Fort Wayne
- Frequency: 93.3 MHz
- Branding: U.S. 93.3

Programming
- Format: Country
- Affiliations: Premiere Networks

Ownership
- Owner: Adams Radio Group; (ARG of Fort Wayne LLC)
- Sister stations: WXKE, WJFX, WWFW

History
- First air date: December 16, 1964-June 1984 (WAWK-FM); June 1984-present (WBTU-FM)

Technical information
- Licensing authority: FCC
- Facility ID: 22106
- Class: B1
- ERP: 25,000 watts
- HAAT: 80 meters (260 ft)
- Translators: 96.9 W245CA (Fort Wayne, relays WJFX-HD3)
- Repeater: 107.9 WJFX-HD3 (New Haven)

Links
- Public license information: Public file; LMS
- Webcast: Listen live
- Website: us933fm.com

WBTU (93.3 FM) is an 25,000-watt radio station licensed to Kendallville, Indiana, serving Fort Wayne, Indiana. WBTU is owned by Adams Radio Group, through licensee ARG of Fort Wayne LLC.

WBTU originally operated as WAWK-FM, a sister station to WAWK AM in Kendallville, from 1964 to 1984. In June 1984, WAWK-FM was sold, renamed to WBTU-FM, and relocated to Fort Wayne.

WBTU is the oldest country station in the Fort Wayne market. Counting the station's WAWK lineage makes the station even older.

In the late 1980s and early 1990s, WBTU used the moniker, Hot Country. In the mid-1990s, the moniker was changed to B93. In the late 1990s and early 2000s, the station was known as Hoosier Country. In 2005, the station simply went by its call letters and frequency (93.3 FM). On May 25, 2007, WBTU changed its branding, becoming U.S. 93.3. A few weeks later, U.S. 93.3 went "commercial-free" but only continued to operate without playing commercials until December 31, 2007.

In 2000, Artistic Media Partners, Inc. bought WBTU and WSHY-FM from 62nd Street, Inc. WBTU and WSHY were moved to a studio inside the Bowen Center on Goshen Road in Fort Wayne.

In January 2007, Artistic Media Partners agreed to sell WBTU and WSHY to Russ Oasis for $3.8 million. Oasis Radio Group owns HOT 107.9 (WJFX-FM), and 106.3 JOE FM in Fort Wayne, also.

On March 6, 2007, a local management agreement was enacted between Artistic Media and Russell Oasis for WBTU and WSHY (which was changed to WVBB, now WRDF).

Former logo

In March 2014, Adams Radio Group, LLC entered an agreement to purchase WBTU along with CHR/Rhythmic 107.9 WJFX from Oasis Radio Group and crosstown Urban CHR 96.3 WNHT, Oldies 1250 WGL and Classic Rock 103.9 WXKE. The purchase, at a price of $6.4 million, was consummated on June 2, 2014.

Effective June 9, 2023, ownership of Adams Radio Group's eighteen stations and translators, including WBTU, was sold for $12.6 million.

== Community ==
In the past, WBTU had regularly helped St. Jude's Research Hospital, MDA, and other organizations. WBTU also served as the radio station sponsor for country night at the Meijer Event Tent during Fort Wayne's Three Rivers Festival in 2006.

== Notable alumni ==
- Dirk Rowley
- Kevin "Crash" Davis
- Dane Daniel
- Ken Knapp
- Jeanette Rinard
- Mitch Mahan
- Chevy Smith
- Dakota McCoy (Gran Roberts)
- Steve "Tiny Little" Michaels
- Kris "Coyote" Underwood
- Dave Collins (Joel Navarro)
- Stephanie Decker
- Dave Riley (David Bradley)
- Scott Dugan
- Dale Christopher
- Jay Fergusion
- (Bill)Collins on the Radio
- Kenny Edwards
- Don Moore
- Gary Mack
- Mack and Moore in the morning
- Doug Montgomery
- T. Daniels
- Mark Allen
