= WGL (AM) =

Radio station in Fort Wayne, Indiana

- Fort Wayne, Indiana; United States
- Broadcast area: Fort Wayne metropolitan area
- Frequency: 1250 kHz
- Branding: WGL Newsradio 1250

Programming
- Format: All-news
- Affiliations: Townhall, Associated Press

Ownership
- Owner: Brian R. Walsh
- Sister stations: WIOE; WIOE-FM

History
- First air date: March 25, 1925
- Former call signs: WHBJ (1925–1926); WCWK (1926–1928)

Technical information
- Licensing authority: FCC
- Facility ID: 22285
- Class: B
- Power: 2,300 watts (day); 1,000 watts (night)
- Transmitter coordinates: 41°4′13.7″N 85°7′10.5″W
- Translator: 105.5 W288EI (Fort Wayne)

Links
- Public license information: Public file; LMS
- Webcast: Listen live
- Website: wgl1250.com

WGL (1250 AM) is a radio station licensed to serve Fort Wayne, Indiana, and owned by Brian R. Walsh. The station broadcasts an All-news format, branded as "WGL Newsradio 1250 and 105.5". WGL is one of the oldest stations in the Fort Wayne metropolitan area.

Studios are located on Cass Street and the transmitter site is located in Fort Wayne's East Central neighborhood in a facility also used by WIOE. WGL simulcasts over Fort Wayne translator W288EI (105.5 FM), which was added on March 5, 2021.

High school football and basketball, primarily Bishop Luers and Bishop Dwenger, began on August 15, 2021. University of Saint Francis football and basketball will be added in the fall of 2022.

== History ==
WGL was first licensed, with the sequentially issued call sign WHBJ, to the Lauer Auto Company at 2109 South Calhoun Street on March 3, 1925. It was Fort Wayne's third broadcasting station, preceded by the United Radio Corporation's WFAS in 1922, and the Strand Theater's WDBV in 1924, although both of these stations had left the airwaves by the time WHBJ debuted.

In 1926 Chester W. Keen took over WHBJ and changed the call letters to WCWK to reflect his initials. Following the establishment of the Federal Radio Commission (FRC), stations were initially issued a series of temporary authorizations starting on May 3, 1927. In addition, stations were informed that if they wanted to continue operating, they needed to file a formal license application by January 15, 1928, as the first step in determining whether they met the new "public interest, convenience, or necessity" standard. On May 25, 1928, the FRC issued General Order 32, which notified 164 stations, including WCWK, that "From an examination of your application for future license it does not find that public interest, convenience, or necessity would be served by granting it." However, the station successfully convinced the commission that it should remain licensed.

On November 11, 1928, the FRC implemented a major reallocation of station transmitting frequencies, as part of a reorganization resulting from its implementation of General Order 40. In early 1929, WCWK was assigned to 1370 kHz. In 1925 WOWO had been established by the Main Auto Supply Co., with studios above the company's downtown factory, and in 1928 Keen sold WCWK to WOWO owner Fred Zieg. WCWK's call letters were changed to WGL ("World's Greatest Loudspeaker"), taking a call sign previously used by the current WADO in New York City.

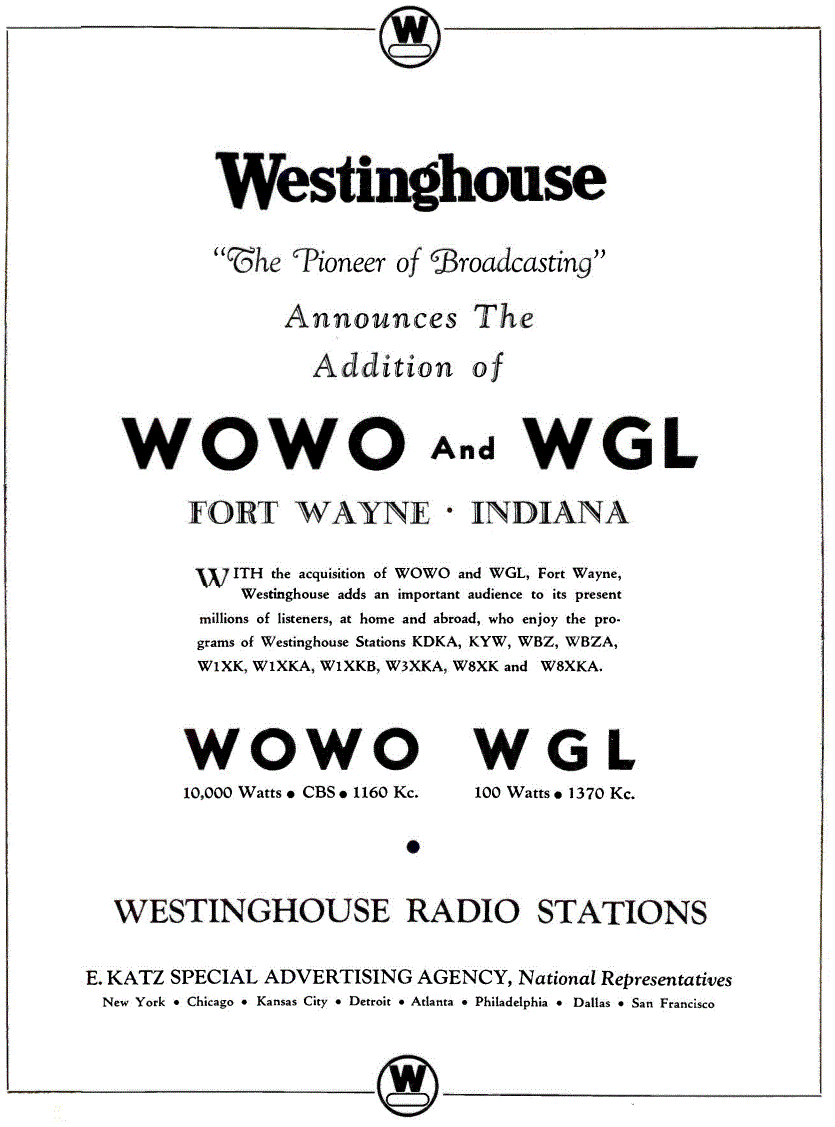
Westinghouse purchased Fort Wayne radio stations WOWO and WGL in 1936.

WOWO and WGL were owned by the Zieg family until their sale to the Westinghouse Electric & Manufacturing Company in 1936. On March 29, 1941, WGL moved to 1450 kHz, as part of the implementation of the North American Regional Broadcasting Agreement. In August 1941, the Federal Communications Commission (FCC) began implementation of a "duopoly" rule, which restricted licensees from operating more than one radio station in a given market. Westinghouse decided to retain WOWO and sold WGL to the Farnsworth Television and Radio Corporation in 1945.

WGL received permission to move to 1250 kHz in 1946. On September 24, 1947, the station's power was increased from 250 to 1,000 watts. Subsequently, it was purchased by the Fort Wayne News-Sentinel. The call letters of WGL were reinterpreted as "Wayne's Great Lady", referring to Helene Foelliger, who had markedly improved circulation of the News-Sentinel since becoming publisher less than a decade earlier, when she became the youngest, as well as one of the first female, publishers of a major newspaper. William Kunkle, publisher of the morning Journal-Gazette, followed by establishing WKJG (William Kunkle Journal-Gazette) in 1947, but while WKJG established a television station (WKJG-TV) in 1953, WGL had no television license.

WGL is known for being the first station in Fort Wayne to carry a talk format and one of the initial stations to carry The Rush Limbaugh Show, which moved to WOWO in 1996. In February 1998, WGL changed its format to sports; most of its programming came from One on One Sports. As a result, they dropped G. Gordon Liddy, Tom Leykis, Art Bell, and local host Rusty Humphries. Between September 1998 and August 2000, WGL aired ESPN Radio, claiming it from rival WOWO. By August 2000, ESPN's affiliation moved to rival WONO, WOWO's sister station. At this point, the format returned to talk, featuring the programs of such hosts as Liddy, Bill O'Reilly, and Jim Rome. Several years later, the format switched to sports talk under the Fox Sports 1250 banner, with the notable exception of Dave Macy's morning program, which covered news, politics, and culture as well as sports.

WGL was sold (along with the other Kovas Communications stations) to Travis Broadcasting Corp. in December 2001, for $7.5 million. WGL was purchased, along with its sister stations by Summit City Radio Group in July 2004. Currently, it broadcasts adult standards, having picked up the format in 2003. WGL aired the syndicated Adult Standards (America's Best Music) format from Dial Global until April 2007, when the station went to a standards/soft AC hybrid with a combination of local DJs and local automation. The station soon returned to airing the Dial Global format with a local morning show.

Weekday programming on The River consisted of Dial Global's America's Best Music format from midnight to noon and then from 6 p.m. to midnight, Dave Ramsey from noon to 3 p.m., and local talk host Pat White from 3 to 6 p.m.

WGL's programming was simulcast full-time on WGL-FM 102.9 until 12 p.m. on April 1, 2010, when the FM station broke away to air a soft AC format as "V102.9". The simulcast returned on June 3, 2013, when both WGL and WGL-FM switched to an oldies format. Former WLYV and WQHK-FM disc jockey Rick Hughes served as the station's morning host; Pat White's show was retained on the simulcast (and moved to 2 to 5 p.m.), while Dave Ramsey was dropped from the WGL lineup.

Former logo as "Fox Sports 1250: The Ticket"

In March 2014, Adams Radio Group, LLC entered an agreement to purchase Summit City's cluster (which includes WGL). Days later, Adams announced they would purchase Oasis Radio Group's stations. To meet ownership limits, Adams retained WNHT, WGL and WXKE, as well as Oasis Radio Group's WJFX and WBTU, and sold off WHPP to Fort Wayne Catholic Radio and WGL-FM to Calvary Radio Network; WLYV and two translators (on 96.9 FM and 103.3 FM) were acquired by Adams from Calvary in the process. The transaction, at a price of $6.4 million, was consummated on June 2, 2014; WGL switched to Fox Sports Radio programming the following day.

On March 22, 2020, due to a significant decline in advertising revenue attributed to the COVID-19 pandemic, Adams Radio Group suspended operations for WGL. A statement on WGL's website read in part that Adams was intending to devote all efforts to their "larger signal stations"; paperwork filed with the FCC indicated that Adams would review options for a resumption of operations for WGL. Three weeks later, Adams announced a sale of WGL and the construction permit for low-power FM translator W233CS (94.5 FM) to Brian R. Walsh—owner of WIOE (1450 AM) and Warsaw-market WIOE-FM 101.1—for $50,000.

Under Walsh's ownership, the station was affiliated with CBS News Radio as it had been as a talk station; when that network shuttered in May 2026, the station switched to the Townhall radio news service, but continued to simulcast the CBS News 24/7 streaming service.

== See also ==
- List of three-letter broadcast call signs in the United States
