= WJFX =

Coordinates: 41.024°N 85.064°W

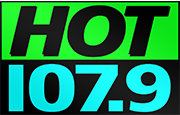
- New Haven, Indiana; United States
- Broadcast area: Fort Wayne, Indiana
- Frequency: 107.9 MHz (HD Radio)
- Branding: Hot 107.9

Programming
- Format: Top 40 (CHR)
- Subchannels: HD2: Rhythmic contemporary "Loud 103.3"; HD3: WBTU simulcast
- Affiliations: Compass Media Networks

Ownership
- Owner: Adams Radio Group; (ARG of Fort Wayne LLC)
- Sister stations: WXKE, WBTU, WWFW

History
- First air date: 1989

Technical information
- Licensing authority: FCC
- Facility ID: 1065
- Class: A
- ERP: 3,200 watts
- HAAT: 138 meters (453 ft)
- Translators: HD3: 96.9 W245CA (Fort Wayne); HD2: 103.3 W277AK (Fort Wayne)

Links
- Public license information: Public file; LMS
- Webcast: Listen Live; Listen Live (HD2); Listen Live (HD3)
- Website: hot1079fortwayne.com loud1033.com (HD2) us933fm.com (HD3)

WJFX (107.9 FM) is a Top 40 radio station located in Fort Wayne, Indiana. It is owned and operated by Adams Radio Group, through licensee ARG of Fort Wayne LLC. WJFX broadcasts three channels in the HD digital format.

== History ==
The station was an urban contemporary formatted radio station, known as FOXY 107.9 from sign-on until 1998, when they changed their direction to rhythmic contemporary as HOT 1079 and finally to contemporary hit radio in 2008. In 2012, the station was moved to the Mediabase contemporary hit radio panel. As of October 2018, Hot 107.9 is the most-listened-to station in the Fort Wayne market.

In March 2014, Adams Radio Group entered an agreement to purchase WJFX and Country 93.3 WBTU from Oasis Radio Group and crosstown Rhythmic CHR 96.3 WNHT, Oldies 1250 WGL and Classic Rock 103.9 WXKE from Summit City Radio. When WXKE moved frequencies to 96.3, Adams pledged to merge WNHT's format into the station, although it has since continued with Top 40. As a result, two former WNHT disc jockeys joined the WJFX on-air staff. The purchase, at a price of $6.4 million, was consummated on June 2, 2014.

In August 2014, Adams Radio Group began an adult urban contemporary format on low-power translator station W245CA, 96.9 FM, known on-air as B96.9. The station technically simulcasts WJFX-HD3, an HD Radio subchannel of WJFX.

Effective June 9, 2023, Adams Radio Group's portfolio of eighteen stations and translators was sold for $12.6 million.

== WJFX-HD2 ==
On September 6, 2017, WJFX launched an active rock format on its HD2 subchannel, branded as "103.3 The Fort" (simulcast on translator W277AK 103.3 FM Fort Wayne).

On November 1, 2018, WJFX-HD2/W277AK dropped active rock for Rhythmic CHR as "Loud 103.3", with an emphasis on Hip-Hop hits. The flip also brings the Rhythmic format back to Fort Wayne after 4 years.

== WJFX-HD3 ==
WJFX-HD3 airs an urban adult contemporary format, branded as "B96.9" (simulcast on translator W245CA 96.9 FM Fort Wayne).

On March 1, 2026, WJFX-HD3/W245CA dropped its urban adult contemporary format and began stunting with a loop redirecting listeners to WJFX-HD2's "Loud 103.3" Rhythmic CHR format.

On March 5, 2026, WJFX-HD3/W245CA ended stunting and switched to a simulcast of country-formatted WBTU 93.3 FM Kendallville.
