= WIOE (AM) =

Radio station in Fort Wayne, Indiana

Simulcasting WIOE-FM South Whitley
- Fort Wayne, Indiana; United States
- Broadcast area: Metropolitan Fort Wayne; Northeastern Indiana; East Central Indiana
- Frequency: 1450 kHz C-QUAM AM stereo
- Branding: Oldies 101.1, 104.3 and Stereo 1450 WIOE

Programming
- Format: Oldies

Ownership
- Owner: Brian Walsh
- Sister stations: WGL, WIOE-FM

History
- First air date: March 28, 1948
- Former call signs: WANE (1948–1966); WLYV (1966–1982); WAFX (1982–1985); WEZR (1985–1990); WLYV (1990–2019)
- Call sign meaning: Originally used on the former WIOE (103.1 FM), now WJCI

Technical information
- Licensing authority: FCC
- Facility ID: 42082
- Class: C
- Power: 1,000 watts
- Transmitter coordinates: 41°04′14″N 85°07′10″W
- Translator: 104.3 W282CH (Fort Wayne)

Links
- Public license information: Public file; LMS
- Webcast: Listen live
- Website: wioe.com

WIOE (1450 AM) is a commercial oldies radio station licensed to serve Fort Wayne, Indiana. Owned by Brian Walsh, the station services the Fort Wayne Metropolitan Area and much of surrounding Northeastern Indiana as a full-power simulcast of WIOE (101.1 FM), licensed to nearby South Whitley. WIOE also simulcasts over Fort Wayne translator W282CH (104.3 FM). The WIOE studios are located in both Warsaw, and Fort Wayne, while WIOE's transmitter resides in Fort Wayne's East Central neighborhood along with W282CH's transmitter of Fort Wayne. In addition to a standard analog transmission, WIOE broadcasts under the C-QUAM AM stereo standard, and is available online.

== History ==
WIOE has a rich history since its beginnings in 1948. The station was originally assigned the call letters WANE, and was owned by the Indiana Broadcasting Company, later known as Corinthian Broadcasting. In 1956, it acquired a sister television station, WANE-TV channel 15.

In the mid-1960s, the radio station was purchased by Sheppard Broadcasting of Grand Rapids, Michigan. Following the purchase by Sheppard, the station changed call letters to WLYV (to become closely related to Sheppard's WLAV in Grand Rapids) and on January 1, 1966, changed formats to become Fort Wayne's first Top 40 station under the direction of programming consultant Mike Joseph, who had already successfully programmed stations in New York City, Detroit, and Chicago. The results were dramatic and immediate. Within a few months, WLYV was the second-highest rated station in Fort Wayne (prior to the format switch, the old WANE was so low in listener rankings that two distant stations, CKLW in Windsor/Detroit and WLS in Chicago, had higher ratings in Fort Wayne).

The success continued as many of the original "LYV GYS" made their mark in Ft. Wayne and moved to larger markets. "Skinny" Bobby Harper went on to succeed in Atlanta, and was the real life model for WKRP In Cincinnati's Dr. Johnny Fever. Jim Reese a.k.a. "Grant Hudson" became a legendary newsman in Detroit, at CKLW and WWJ. Morning man and program director Jim "Uncle Felty" Felton moved to CKLW and became the most listened to morning man in Toronto at CFTR. Ron White became one of America's respected programming consultants. Other major market personalities who worked at WLYV include Bob Todd, Ron Morgan, and Bobby Knight. In later years, Program Director Bob Hamilton and high energy personalities like Phil Gardner, Jay Walker, "Shotgun Lenny Harrison" Chuck Martin and locals own Ted Hatch continued growing the station's popularity.

It was WLYV's relatively low power output (1,000 watts) and the appearance of a more tightly formatted Top 40 station in town WMEE lead to WLYV's demise as a Top 40 icon. By 1974, "The Lyv One" was forced to change formats again and became "Lively Country." This change turned out to be successful for the station. WLYV's low power became an issue again, however, within several years when WMEE switched its call letters and moved to FM, leaving the 1380 AM frequency and its 5,000-watt operating power later becoming a country formatted station 1380 The Hawk. WLYV was owned by legendary golfer Jack Nicklaus from 1974 to 1980 under the operating name Golden Bear Broadcasting. The studios were located inside the Anthony Wayne Building at the time in suite 925.

In the spring of 1980, WLYV changed call letters and ownership to WAFX when the station was sold to Clarence Moore Broadcasting, which owned beautiful music WCMX at the time and moved the station to 424 Reed Road. The format remained country until 1982.

Spring of 1982, WAFX was purchased by WAJI for a very brief stint and took the call letters WEZR. In the Fall of 1982, WEZR was purchased by Fairfield Broadcasting of Kalamazoo who also owned WKZO-AM-FM. Fairfield owned WEZR for an entire year before purchasing former sister station WCMX and changed the name of that station to WEZV to reflect the same ownership group. Fairfield would own both stations for several years until 1989 when WEZR would return once again to the famous WLYV call letters under new ownership of Christian radio owner/operator Midwest Broadcasting Corporation which moved the studios to 4705 Illinois Road, airing a Christian music and teaching format (Midwest Broadcasting today is Christian Broadcast System Ltd. and is based in Flint, Michigan).

In 2005, WLYV was sold once again to Fort Wayne Catholic Radio Group, which operated a Catholic Talk format at 1450 as "1450 Redeemer Radio". In May 2010, the studios were moved from 4705 Illinois Road to 4618 E State Blvd. citing reasons of space and technology upgrade.

In 2014, WLYV was sold to Adams Radio Group. The Redeemer Radio format moved to 106.3 FM on June 2. WLYV simulcast 106.3 until the 4th of July, when 1450 began stunting with patriotic songs and sound clips to honor the holiday, before debuting a Talk radio format as "Intelligent Talk, AM 1450 The Patriot" on July 6 at Noon.

On March 10, 2016, the 50th anniversary of the rebrand as WLYV, 1450 flipped to oldies, utilizing Westwood One's Good Time Oldies network, as "14-5-Oh WLYV".

Effective July 15, 2019, Adams Radio Group sold WLYV and translator W282CH to Brian Walsh, at a purchase price of $200,000.

On July 29, 2019, WLYV switched to a simulcast of oldies-formatted WIOE 101.1 FM South Whitley, branded as "Oldies 101.1 & 104.3 WIOE". WIOE changed its call sign to WIOE-FM on July 30, 2019, freeing up the WIOE call sign to be assumed by WLYV on August 6, 2019.

After receiving FCC approval in May, WIOE began testing digital only transmissions using the HD Radio MA3 mode. These tests were discontinued on September 11, 2020, due to listener complaints.
