= List of radio stations in Indiana =

The following is a list of FCC-licensed radio stations in the U.S. state of Indiana, which can be sorted by their call signs, frequencies, cities of license, licensees, and programming formats.

== List of radio stations ==
Call sign	Frequency	City of license	Licensee	Format
WABX	107.5 FM	Evansville	Midwest Communications, Inc.	Classic rock
WAJI	95.1 FM	Fort Wayne	Sarkes Tarzian, Inc.	Adult contemporary
WAKE	1500 AM	Valparaiso	Marion R. Williams	Oldies
WAMW	1580 AM	Washington	Shake Broadcasting, LLC	Country
WAMW-FM	107.9 FM	Washington	Shake Broadcasting, LLC	Classic hits
WAOR	102.7 FM	Ligonier	Pathfinder Communications Corporation	Hot adult contemporary
WAOV	1450 AM	Vincennes	Old Northwest Broadcasting, Inc.	News/Talk
WARA-FM	88.3 FM	New Washington	Educational Media Foundation	Worship music (Air1)
WARU-FM	101.9 FM	Roann	Dream Weaver Marketing, LLC	Album-oriented rock
WASK	1450 AM	Lafayette	Neuhoff Media Lafayette, LLC	Sports (ESPN)
WASK-FM	98.7 FM	Battle Ground	Neuhoff Media Lafayette, LLC	Classic hits
WATI	89.9 FM	Vincennes	American Family Association	Religious talk (AFR)
WAUZ	89.1 FM	Greensburg	Good Shepherd Radio Inc	Southern gospel
WAWC	103.5 FM	Syracuse	Kensington Digital Media of Indiana, L.L.C.	Country
WAWK	1140 AM	Kendallville	Northeast Indiana Broadcasting, Inc.	Classic hits
WAXI	104.9 FM	Rockville	DLC Media, Inc.	Country
WAXL	103.3 FM	Santa Claus	Dubois County Broadcasting, Inc.	Hot adult contemporary
WAYI	104.3 FM	Charlestown	Hope Media Group	Contemporary Christian
WAZY-FM	96.5 FM	Lafayette	CTI License LLC	Top 40 (CHR)
WBAA	920 AM	West Lafayette	Metropolitan Indianapolis Public Media, Inc.	Public radio
WBAA-FM	101.3 FM	West Lafayette	Metropolitan Indianapolis Public Media, Inc.	Public radio
WBAT	1400 AM	Marion	Hoosier AM/FM, LLC	Full service soft AC
WBCL	90.3 FM	Fort Wayne	Taylor University Broadcasting, Inc.	Christian adult contemporary
WBCW	89.7 FM	Upland	Taylor University Broadcasting, Inc.	Christian adult contemporary
WBDC	100.9 FM	Huntingburg	Dubois County Broadcasting, Inc.	Country
WBDG	90.9 FM	Indianapolis	Metropolitan School District of Wayne Township	Variety
WBED	90.1 FM	Bedford	Cause 4 Paws, Inc.	Oldies
WBEW	89.5 FM	Chesterton	Chicago Public Media Inc.	Public radio
WBGW	1330 AM	Evansville	Music Ministries, Inc.	Christian
WBGW-FM	101.5 FM	Fort Branch	Music Ministries, Inc.	Contemporary Christian
WBHW	88.7 FM	Loogootee	Music Ministries, Inc.	Contemporary Christian
WBIW	1340 AM	Bedford	Ad-Venture Media, Inc.	News/Talk
WBKC	90.9 FM	Morgantown	Educational Media Foundation	Christian adult contemporary (K-Love)
WBKQ	96.7 FM	Alexandria	Woof Boom Radio Muncie License LLC	Country
WBNL	1540 AM	Boonville	Turpen Communications, LLC	Easy listening
WBOI	89.1 FM	Fort Wayne	Northeast Indiana Public Radio, Inc	Public radio
WBOW	102.7 FM	Terre Haute	Midwest Communications, Inc.	Classic hits
WBPE	95.3 FM	Brookston	CTI License LLC	Adult hits
WBRI	1500 AM	Indianapolis	Heritage Christian Radio, Inc.	Religious
WBSB	89.5 FM	Anderson	Ball State University	Public radio
WBSH	91.1 FM	Hagerstown	Ball State University	Public radio
WBST	92.1 FM	Muncie	Ball State University	Public radio
WBSW	90.9 FM	Marion	Ball State University	Public radio
WBTO-FM	102.3 FM	Petersburg	The Original Company, Inc	Classic rock
WBTU	93.3 FM	Kendallville	ARG of Fort Wayne LLC	Country
WBWB	96.7 FM	Bloomington	Sound Management, LLC	Top 40 (CHR)
WBYR	98.9 FM	Woodburn	Pathfinder Communications Corporation	Active rock
WBYT	100.7 FM	Elkhart	Pathfinder Communications Corporation	Country
WBZQ	1300 AM	Huntington	Fifty Seven Media LLC	Silent
WCBK-FM	102.3 FM	Martinsville	Mid-America Radio Group, Inc.	Country
WCDQ	106.3 FM	Crawfordsville	C.V.L. Broadcasting, Inc.	Country
WCFY-LP	99.1 FM	Evansville	Christian Fellowship Church Inc	Contemporary Christian
WCJC	99.3 FM	Van Buren	Hoosier AM/FM, LLC	Country
WCJZ	105.7 FM	Cannelton	Hancock Communications, Inc.	Classic rock
WCKZ	91.3 FM	Orland	Star Educational Media Network, Inc.	Contemporary Christian
WCLJ-LP	107.3 FM	Lafayette	The Church in Lafayette, Inc.	Religious Teaching
WCLS	97.7 FM	Spencer	Mid-America Radio of Indiana, Inc.	Classic hits
WCMR	1270 AM	Elkhart	Progressive Broadcasting System, Inc.	Talk
WCNB	91.5 FM	Dayton	Community Radio Partners	Contemporary Christian
WCOE	96.7 FM	La Porte	Spoon River Media, LLC	Country
WCRD	91.3 FM	Muncie	Ball State University	Top 40 (CHR)
WCRT-FM	88.5 FM	Terre Haute	University of Northwestern – St. Paul	Contemporary Christian
WCSI	1010 AM	Columbus	White River Broadcasting Co., Inc.	News/Talk
WCVL	1550 AM	Crawfordsville	C.V.L. Broadcasting, Inc.	Classic hits
WCYI-LP	104.1 FM	Bloomington	St. Charles Borromeo Catholic Church Bloomington, Inc.	Catholic
WCYT	91.1 FM	Lafayette Township	Southwest Allen County Schools	Indie
WDBF-LP	103.5 FM	Decatur	North Adams Community Schools	Variety
WDCK	101.1 FM	Bloomfield	Mid-America Radio Group Inc.	Country
WDKS	106.1 FM	Newburgh	Townsquare Media of Evansville/Owensboro, Inc.	Top 40 (CHR)
WDSO	88.3 FM	Chesterton	Duneland School Corp.	Grade School
WDXM-LP	98.9 FM	Newburgh	Newburgh Enlightenment Radio Center, Inc.	Oldies
WEAX	88.3 FM	Angola	Star Educational Media Network, Inc.	Contemporary Christian
WECI	91.5 FM	Richmond	Earlham College	Variety
WEDJ	107.1 FM	Danville	Continental Broadcast Group, LLC	Regional Mexican
WEDM	91.1 FM	Indianapolis	Metropolitan School District of Warren Township	Grade school
WEEM-FM	91.7 FM	Pendleton	South Madison Community School Corp.	Top 40 (CHR)
WEFM	95.9 FM	Michigan City	Michigan City FM Broadcasters, Inc.	Soft adult contemporary
WEHP	93.7 FM	Clinton	American Hope Communications, Inc.	Christian
WEJK-LP	100.7 FM	Connersville	Fayette County Emergency Management	Emergency Info
WELT-LP	95.7 FM	Fort Wayne	Allen County Public Library	Variety
WEOA	1400 AM	Evansville	BLS Entertainment, Inc.	Urban contemporary
WEPB-LP	106.3 FM	Noblesville	Enduring Communications Inc	Variety
WERK	104.9 FM	Muncie	Woof Boom Radio Muncie License LLC	Classic hits
WETF-LP	105.7 FM	South Bend	Latino Task Force for Education, Inc.	Jazz
WETL	91.7 FM	South Bend	South Bend Community School Corp.	High school
WFBQ	94.7 FM	Indianapolis	iHM Licenses, LLC	Classic rock
WFCV	1090 AM	Fort Wayne	Bott Broadcasting Company	Religious talk (Bott Radio Network)
WFCV-FM	100.1 FM	Bluffton	Bott Communications, Inc.	Religious talk (Bott Radio Network)
WFDM-FM	95.9 FM	Franklin	Pilgrim Communications, LLC	Talk
WFHB	91.3 FM	Bloomington	Bloomington Community Radio Inc	Community radio
WFIU	103.7 FM	Bloomington	Trustees of Indiana University	Public radio
WFLQ	100.1 FM	French Lick	Willtronics Broadcasting	Country
WFMG	101.3 FM	Richmond	Rodgers Broadcasting Corporation	Hot adult contemporary
WFML	96.7 FM	Vincennes	The Vincennes University Foundation, Inc.	Mainstream rock
WFMS	95.5 FM	Indianapolis/Fishers	Radio License Holding SRC LLC	Country
WFNB	1130 AM	Brazil	JKO Media Group	Sports (FSR)
WFNF	92.7 FM	Brazil	JKO Media Group	Active rock
WFNI	1070 AM	Indianapolis	Emmis Radio License, LLC	Silent
WFOF	90.3 FM	Covington	The Moody Bible Institute of Chicago	Contemporary Christian
WFRI	100.1 FM	Winamac	Progressive Broadcasting System, Inc	Contemporary Christian
WFRN-FM	104.7 FM	Elkhart	Progressive Broadcasting System, Inc.	Contemporary Christian
WFRR	93.7 FM	Walton	Christian Friends Broadcasting, Inc.	Contemporary Christian
WFWI	92.3 FM	Fort Wayne	Pathfinder Communications Corporation	News/Talk
WFWR	91.5 FM	Attica	Fountain Warren Community Radio Corp	Variety
WFYI-FM	90.1 FM	Indianapolis	Metropolitan Indnpls. Public B/Cing, Inc.	Public radio
WGAB	1180 AM	Newburgh	Faith Broadcasting, LLC	Religious
WGBF	1280 AM	Evansville	Townsquare Media of Evansville/Owensboro, Inc.	Silent
WGBJ	102.3 FM	Auburn	Sarkes Tarzian, Inc.	Alternative rock
WGCL	1370 AM	Bloomington	Sarkes Tarzian, Inc,	News/Talk
WGCS	91.1 FM	Goshen	Goshen College Broadcasting Corporation	College
WGIP	89.9 FM	Greensburg	Two Black Cadillacs	Variety
WGL	1250 AM	Fort Wayne	Brian Walsh	News
WGLL	1570 AM	Auburn	The Raymond S. And Dorothy N. Moore Foundation, Inc.	Religious
WGNR	1470 AM	Anderson	The Moody Bible Institute of Chicago	Contemporary Christian
WGNR-FM	97.9 FM	Anderson	The Moody Bible Institute of Chicago	Contemporary Christian
WGOO-LP	103.7 FM	Fremont	Fremont Community Broadcasters, Inc.	Classic hits
WGRE	91.5 FM	Greencastle	Depauw University	College
WGVE-FM	88.7 FM	Gary	Gary Community School Corp.	Music/Talk/Sports
WGZB-FM	96.5 FM	Lanesville	Alpha Media Licensee LLC Debtor in Possession	Urban contemporary
WHBU	1240 AM	Anderson	Woof Boom Radio Muncie License LLC	Oldies
WHCC	105.1 FM	Ellettsville	Sound Management, LLC	Country
WHHC-LP	100.1 FM	New Castle	New Castle Broadcasting Service, Inc.	Religious (Radio 74 Internationale)
WHHH	100.9 FM	Speedway	Radio One of Indiana, LLC	Urban contemporary
WHJE	91.3 FM	Carmel	Carmel/Clay School Corporation	Alternative
WHLP	89.9 FM	Hanna	Calvary Radio Network, Inc.	Christian (Calvary Radio Network)
WHLR	95.9 FM	Seelyville	Educational Media Foundation	Contemporary Christian (K-Love)
WHLY	1580 AM	South Bend	I.B. Communications, Ltd.	Regional Mexican
WHME	103.1 FM	South Bend	Lesea Broadcasting Corporation	Religious
WHMO	91.1 FM	Madison	Good Shepherd Radio, Inc.	Southern gospel
WHOJ	91.9 FM	Terre Haute	Covenant Network	Catholic
WHPL	89.9 FM	West Lafayette	The Moody Bible Institute of Chicago	Inspirational
WHPZ	96.9 FM	Bremen	Lesea Broadcasting Corporation	Contemporary Christian
WHUM-LP	98.5 FM	Columbus	Columbus Community Radio Corporation	Country/Folk/Oldies
WHZN	88.3 FM	New Whiteland	Olivet Nazarene University	Christian Adult Contemporary
WHZR	103.7 FM	Royal Center	Iron Horse Broadcasting, LLC	Country
WIAH-LP	103.5 FM	Evansville	Mother of the Redeemer Radio, Inc.	Religious Teaching
WIBC	93.1 FM	Indianapolis	Radio One of Indiana, LLC	News/Talk
WIBN	98.1 FM	Earl Park	Brothers Broadcasting Corporation	Classic hits
WICR	88.7 FM	Indianapolis	University of Indianapolis	Jazz & Classical
WIFE-FM	94.3 FM	Rushville	Rodgers Broadcasting Corp.	Country
WIKL	101.7 FM	Elwood	Educational Media Foundation	Contemporary Christian (K-Love)
WIKV	89.3 FM	Plymouth	Educational Media Foundation	Contemporary Christian (K-Love)
WIKY-FM	104.1 FM	Evansville	Midwest Communications, Inc.	Adult contemporary
WILO	1570 AM	Frankfort	Kasper Broadcasting Company, Inc.	Classic hits
WIMC	103.9 FM	Crawfordsville	C.V.L. Broadcasting, Inc.	Classic rock
WIMS	1420 AM	Michigan City	Gerard Media, LLC	News/Talk/Sports
WINN	104.9 FM	Columbus	White River Broadcasting Company, Inc.	Hot adult contemporary
WIOE	1450 AM	Fort Wayne	Brian Walsh	Oldies
WIOE-FM	101.1 FM	South Whitley	Brian R. Walsh	Oldies/Classic hits/Classic top 40
WIOU	1350 AM	Kokomo	Hoosier AM/FM, LLC	Sports (ESPN)
WIRE	91.1 FM	Lebanon	Community Radio Partners	Adult top 40
WISU	89.7 FM	Terre Haute	Indiana State University Board of Trustees	Alternative rock
WITT	91.9 FM	Zionsville	Kids First Incorporated	Community radio
WITW-LP	93.5 FM	Valparaiso	The Book of Life Bible Institute, Inc.	Contemporary Christian
WITZ	990 AM	Jasper	Jasper On The Air, Inc.	Regional Mexican
WITZ-FM	104.7 FM	Jasper	Jasper On The Air, Inc.	Adult contemporary
WIUX-LP	99.1 FM	Bloomington	Indiana University Student Broadcasting	Variety
WIVR	101.7 FM	Kentland	Milner Media Partners, LLC	Country
WIWC	91.7 FM	Kokomo	The Moody Bible Institute of Chicago	Contemporary Christian
WIWU-LP	94.3 FM	Marion	Indiana Wesleyan University	Contemporary Christian/Variety
WJAA	96.3 FM	Austin	Social Butterfly Media, LLC.	Album-oriented rock
WJCI	102.9 FM	Huntington	Calvary Radio Network, Inc.	Christian (Calvary Radio Network)
WJCO	91.3 FM	Montpelier	Calvary Radio Network, Inc.	Christian (Calvary Radio Network)
WJCP	1460 AM	North Vernon	Jennings County Promotion Partners, LLC	Classic hits
WJCY	91.5 FM	Cicero	Calvary Radio Network, Inc.	Christian (Calvary Radio Network)
WJEF	91.9 FM	Lafayette	Lafayette School Corp.	Oldies
WJEL	89.3 FM	Indianapolis	Metropolitan School District of Washington Township	High school
WJFX	107.9 FM	New Haven	ARG of Fort Wayne LLC	Top 40 (CHR)
WJHI-LP	98.5 FM	Jeffersonville	Greater Clark County Schools	Variety
WJHS	91.5 FM	Columbia City	Columbia City Joint High School	Adult album alternative
WJJD-LP	101.3 FM	Kokomo	Kokomo Seventh-day Adventist Broadcasting Company	Religious (Radio 74 Internationale)
WJJK	104.5 FM	Indianapolis/Noblesville	Radio License Holding SRC LLC	Classic hits
WJLR	91.5 FM	Seymour	Educational Media Foundation	Contemporary Christian (K-Love)
WJLT	105.3 FM	Evansville	Townsquare Media of Evansville/Owensboro, Inc.	Adult contemporary
WJOB	1230 AM	Hammond	Vazquez Development, LLC	News/Talk/Sports
WJOT-FM	105.9 FM	Wabash	Dream Weaver Marketing, LLC	Oldies
WJPR	91.7 FM	Jasper	Jasper Public Radio, Inc.	Public radio/Classic hits
WJPS	107.1 FM	Boonville	The Original Company, Inc.	Classic hits
WJUK-LP	105.7 FM	Plymouth	Menominee Radio Corporation	Oldies
WJWA	91.5 FM	Evansville	Hope Media Group	Contemporary Christian
WJYW	88.9 FM	Union City	Star Educational Media Network, Inc.	Contemporary Christian
WKAM	1460 AM	Goshen	I.B. Communications, Ltd.	Regional Mexican
WKBV	1490 AM	Richmond	Rodgers Broadcasting Corporation	News/Talk
WKHY	93.5 FM	Lafayette	Neuhoff Media Lafayette, LLC	Active rock
WKID	95.9 FM	Vevay	Dial Broadcasting Inc	Country
WKIL-LP	93.5 FM	Elkhart	Kingdom Impact Christian Cultural Church Inc	Gospel
WKJD	90.3 FM	Columbus	Good Shepherd Radio, Inc.	Contemporary Christian
WKJG	1380 AM	Fort Wayne	Pathfinder Communications Corporation	Sports (FSR)
WKKG	101.5 FM	Columbus	White River Broadcasting Co. Inc.	Country
WKLO	96.9 FM	Hardinsburg	Diamond Shores Broadcasting, LLC	Country
WKLU	101.9 FM	Brownsburg	Educational Media Foundation	Contemporary Christian (K-Love)
WKMV	88.3 FM	Muncie	Educational Media Foundation	Contemporary Christian (K-Love)
WKOA	105.3 FM	Lafayette	Neuhoff Media Lafayette, LLC	Country
WKPW	90.7 FM	Knightstown	New Castle Career Center	Classic hits/Classic rock/Classic top 40/Oldies
WKRT	89.3 FM	Richmond	Educational Media Foundation	Contemporary Christian (K-Love)
WKRY	88.1 FM	Versailles	Good Shepherd Radio Inc.	Southern gospel
WKUZ	95.9 FM	Wabash	Upper Wabash Broadcasting Corp.	Country
WKVI	1520 AM	Knox	Kankaee Valley Broadcasting Co., Inc	All news
WKVI-FM	99.3 FM	Knox	Kankaee Valley Broadcasting Co., Inc	Oldies
WKZS	103.1 FM	Covington	Benton-Weatherford Broadcasting, Inc., of Indiana	Country
WLAB	88.3 FM	Fort Wayne	Star Educational Media Network, Inc.	Contemporary Christian
WLBC-FM	104.1 FM	Muncie	Woof Boom Radio Muncie License LLC	Hot adult contemporary
WLCL	93.9 FM	Sellersburg	UB Louisville, LLC	Sports (ESPN)
WLDC-LP	105.9 FM	Goshen	Iglesia Sinai Pentecostes, Inc.	Spanish religious
WLDE	101.7 FM	Fort Wayne	Sarkes Tarzian, Inc.	Classic hits
WLEG-LP	104.3 FM	Goshen	Latinos Pro Education	Regional Mexican
WLFQ-LP	98.7 FM	Elkhart	Centro Evangelistico Latino Americano, Inc.	Christian Contemporary
WLGK	94.7 FM	New Albany	Word Broadcasting Network, Inc.	Worship
WLHK	97.1 FM	Shelbyville	Radio One of Indiana, LLC	Country
WLHM	102.3 FM	Logansport	Iron Horse Broadcasting, LLC	Classic hits
WLJE	105.5 FM	Valparaiso	ARG of Northern Indiana LLC	Country
WLKI	100.3 FM	Angola	Swick Broadcasting Company, Inc.	Adult contemporary
WLOI	1540 AM	La Porte	Spoon River Media, LLC	Classic rock
WLPK	1580 AM	Connersville	Rodgers Broadcasting Corporation	Classic hits
WLPR-FM	89.1 FM	Lowell	Northwest Indiana Public Broadcasting, Inc.	Public radio
WLQI	97.7 FM	Rensselaer	Brothers Broadcasting Corporation	Classic rock
WLQQ	106.7 FM	West Lafayette	Woof Boom Radio Lafayette LLC	Adult contemporary
WLQZ-LP	93.9 FM	Warsaw	Blessed Beginnings	Top 40 (CHR)
WLRS	1570 AM	New Albany	New Albany Broadcasting Co., Inc.	Oldies
WLTH	1370 AM	Gary	WLTH Radio, Inc.	Community radio
WLTI	1550 AM	New Castle	Radio License Holding CBC, LLC	Classic country
WLXJ	88.9 FM	Battle Ground	Educational Media Foundation	Contemporary Christian (K-Love)
WLYD	93.5 FM	Chandler	Midwest Communications, Inc.	Country
WLZT	94.1 FM	Worthington	Mid-America Radio Group, Inc.	
WMBL	88.1 FM	Mitchell	The Moody Bible Institute of Chicago	Contemporary Christian
WMCV	96.3 FM	Farmersburg	Community Broadcasting, Inc.	Religious talk (Bott Radio Network)
WMDH-FM	102.5 FM	New Castle	Radio License Holding CBC, LLC	Country
WMEE	97.3 FM	Fort Wayne	Pathfinder Communications Corporation	Hot adult contemporary
WMGI	100.7 FM	Terre Haute	Midwest Communications, Inc.	Top 40 (CHR)
WMKI-LP	96.9 FM	Terre Haute	Wabash Valley Educational Media	Alternative rock
WMPI	105.3 FM	Scottsburg	D.R. Rice Broadcasting, Inc.	Country
WMRI	860 AM	Marion	Hoosier AM/FM, LLC	Sports (ESPN)
WMRS	107.7 FM	Monticello	Monticello Community Radio, Inc.	Adult contemporary
WMUN	1340 AM	Muncie	Woof Boom Radio Muncie License LLC	News/Talk/Sports (FSR)
WMVI	106.7 FM	Mount Vernon	The Original Company, Inc	Adult contemporary
WMXQ	93.5 FM	Hartford City	Woof Boom Radio Muncie License LLC	Classic rock
WMYJ	1540 AM	Martinsville	Mid-America Radio Group, Inc.	Southern gospel
WMYJ-FM	88.9 FM	Oolitic	Spirit Educational Radio, Inc.	Southern gospel
WMYK	98.5 FM	Peru	Hoosier AM/FM, LLC	Mainstream rock
WNAP-FM	88.1 FM	Morristown	New Beginnings Movement, Inc.	Contemporary Christian
WNAP-LP	99.1 FM	Muncie	Jackson Park Baptist Church, Inc.	Southern gospel
WNAS	88.1 FM	New Albany	New Albany-Floyd Cty.Con.Sch.Corp.	Grade school
WNDE	1260 AM	Indianapolis	iHM Licenses, LLC	Sports (FSR)
WNDI	1550 AM	Sullivan	J T M Broadcasting Corporation	Country
WNDI-FM	95.3 FM	Sullivan	J T M Broadcasting Corporation	Country
WNDV-FM	92.9 FM	South Bend	Sound Management, LLC	Top 40 (CHR)
WNDX	93.9 FM	Lawrence	Radio License Holding SRC LLC	Mainstream rock
WNDY	91.3 FM	Crawfordsville	Wabash College Radio, Inc.	College
WNDZ	750 AM	Portage	WNDZ LLC	Brokered programming
WNHE-LP	101.3 FM	New Haven	Associated Churches of Fort Wayne and Allen County, Inc	Variety
WNIN-FM	88.3 FM	Evansville	WNIN Tri-State Public Media, Inc.	News/Talk
WNPP	88.5 FM	Cole	New Beginnings Movement Inc	
WNSN	101.5 FM	South Bend	WSJM, Inc.	Adult contemporary
WNTR	107.9 FM	Indianapolis	Radio License Holding SRC LLC	Adult contemporary
WNTS	1590 AM	Beech Grove	Continental Broadcast Group, L.L.C.	Spanish oldies
WOCC	1550 AM	Corydon	Two Hawks Communications LLC	Oldies
WOJC	89.7 FM	Crothersville	Calvary Radio Network, Inc.	Christian (Calvary Radio Network)
WOLT	103.3 FM	Indianapolis	iHM Licenses, LLC	Classic alternative
WOMB	89.9 FM	Ellettsville	Mary's Children, Inc.	Catholic
WORX-FM	96.7 FM	Madison	Dubois County Broadcasting, Inc.	Hot adult contemporary
WOWO	1190 AM	Fort Wayne	Pathfinder Communications Corporation	News/Talk
WPFR	1480 AM	Terre Haute	American Hope Communications, Inc.	Conservative talk
WPGW	1440 AM	Portland	WPGW, Inc.	Adult contemporary
WPGW-FM	100.9 FM	Portland	WPGW, Inc.	Country
WPHZ	102.5 FM	Orleans	Mitchell Community Broadcast Company, Inc.	Adult contemporary
WPIW	1590 AM	Mount Vernon	The Original Company, Inc	Classic country
WPMQ-LP	99.3 FM	Charlestown	City of Charlestown, IN	Variety
WPSR	90.7 FM	Evansville	Evansville-Vanderburgh School Corp.	Variety
WPWX	92.3 FM	Hammond	Dontron, Inc.	Mainstream urban
WQHK-FM	105.1 FM	Decatur	Jam Communications, Inc.	Country
WQHU-LP	105.5 FM	Huntington	Huntington University	Christian rock
WQKO	91.9 FM	Howe	Calvary Radio Network, Inc.	Christian (Calvary Radio Network)
WQKV	88.7 FM	Warsaw	Educational Media Foundation	Christian adult contemporary (K-Love)
WQKZ	98.5 FM	Ferdinand	Jasper on the Air, Inc.	Country
WQLK	96.1 FM	Richmond	Brewer Broadcasting Corporation	Country
WQME	98.7 FM	Anderson	Educational Media Foundation	Contemporary worship (Air1)
WQMF	95.7 FM	Jeffersonville	iHM Licenses, LLC	Mainstream rock
WQRA	90.5 FM	Greencastle	Educational Media Foundation	Worship music (Air1)
WQRK	105.5 FM	Bedford	Ad-Venture Media, Inc.	Classic hits
WQRT-LP	99.1 FM	Indianapolis	Big Car Media	Variety
WQSG	90.7 FM	Lafayette	American Family Association	Religious talk (AFR)
WQSW-LP	100.5 FM	Fort Wayne	Quasi, Inc.	Talk/Gospel
WQTY	93.3 FM	Linton	The Original Company, Inc	Contemporary Christian
WRAY	1250 AM	Princeton	Princeton Broadcasting Co., Inc.	Talk
WRAY-FM	98.1 FM	Princeton	Princeton Broadcasting Co., Inc.	Country
WRBI	103.9 FM	Batesville	Leeson Media, LLC	Country
WRBR-FM	103.9 FM	South Bend	Talking Stick Communications, L.L.C.	Active rock
WRDF	106.3 FM	Columbia City	Fort Wayne Catholic Radio Group, Inc.	Catholic
WRDI	95.7 FM	Nappanee	St. Joseph Catholic Radio Group, LLC	Catholic
WREB	94.3 FM	Greencastle	The Original Company, Inc	Classic rock
WRFT	91.5 FM	Indianapolis	Franklin Township Community School Corp.	Grade school
WRGF	89.7 FM	Greenfield	Greenfield Central Community School Corp.	Grade school
WRIN	1560 AM	Rensselaer	Brothers Broadcasting Corporation	Classic country
WRNP	94.1 FM	Roanoke	Taylor University Broadcasting, Inc.	Urban gospel
WROI	92.1 FM	Rochester	3 Towers Broadcasting Company, LLC	Classic hits
WRSW	1480 AM	Warsaw	Kensington Digital Media of Indiana, L.L.C.	News/Talk
WRSW-FM	107.3 FM	Warsaw	Kensington Digital Media of Indiana, L.L.C.	Classic hits
WRTW	90.5 FM	Crown Point	Hyles Anderson College	Christian
WRWT-LP	93.7 FM	Syracuse	Wawasee Community School Corporation	Hot adult contemporary
WRZQ-FM	107.3 FM	Greensburg	Reising Radio Partners Inc	Hot adult contemporary
WRZR	94.5 FM	Loogootee	Shake Broadcasting, LLC	Classic rock
WSAL	1230 AM	Logansport	Iron Horse Broadcasting, LLC	News/Talk/Sports
WSBL-LP	93.5 FM	South Bend	South Bend Council 5001, Inc.	Spanish CHR
WSBT	960 AM	South Bend	WSJM, Inc.	News/Talk
WSCH	99.3 FM	Aurora	Wagon Wheel Broadcasting, LLC	Country
WSDM	90.1 FM	Wadesville	The Innovation Center Inc.	Oldies
WSEZ	1560 AM	Paoli	Diamond Shores Broadcasting, LLC	Oldies
WSFR	107.7 FM	Corydon	SM-WSFR, LLC	Classic rock
WSHI-LP	98.5 FM	Shelbyville	Shelbyville S.D.A. Broadcasting Services, Inc.	Christian
WSHT-LP	100.1 FM	Indianapolis	Sabbath Incorporated	Religious teaching
WSHW	99.7 FM	Frankfort	Oliver Nazarene University	Contemporary Christian
WSHY	1410 AM	Lafayette	CTI License LLC	News/Talk
WSJD	100.5 FM	Princeton	WSJD, Inc.	Classic hits
WSKL	92.9 FM	Veedersburg	Zona Communications, Inc.	Oldies
WSLM	1220 AM	Salem	Rebecca L. White	News/Sports
WSLM-FM	97.9 FM	Salem	Rebecca L. White	News/Sports
WSND-FM	88.9 FM	Notre Dame	Voice of The Fighting Irish, Inc.	College
WSOM	89.5 FM	Franklin	Inter Mirifica, Inc.	Catholic
WSPM	89.1 FM	Cloverdale	Inter Mirifica, Inc.	Catholic
WSQM	90.9 FM	Noblesville	Inter Mirifica, Inc.	Catholic
WSRC	88.1 FM	Waynetown	Calvary Chapel of Crawfordsville, Inc.	Christian talk/music
WSVX	1520 AM	Shelbyville	3 Towers Broadcasting Company, LLC	Country
WSWI	820 AM	Evansville	University of Southern Indiana Board of Trustees	College
WSYW	810 AM	Indianapolis	Continental Broadcast Group, LLC	Spanish adult contemporary
WTCA	1050 AM	Plymouth	Community Service Broadcasters, Inc.	Hot adult contemporary
WTCJ	1230 AM	Tell City	Hancock Communications, Inc.	Adult hits
WTFX-FM	93.1 FM	Clarksville	iHM Licenses, LLC	Mainstream urban
WTGO-LP	97.7 FM	Lafayette	Harvest Chapel, Inc.	Christian rock
WTHD	105.5 FM	Lagrange	Swick Broadcasting Company, Inc.	Country
WTHI-FM	99.9 FM	Terre Haute	Midwest Communications, Inc.	Country
WTJW-LP	93.1 FM	Jasper	Tristate Catholic Radio	Catholic
WTLC	1310 AM	Indianapolis	Radio One of Indiana, LLC	Urban contemporary gospel
WTLC-FM	106.7 FM	Greenwood	Radio One of Indiana, LLC	Urban adult contemporary
WTMK	88.5 FM	Wanatah	Olivet Nazarene University	Contemporary Christian
WTRC	1340 AM	Elkhart	Pathfinder Communications Corporation	News/Talk
WTRE	1330 AM	Greensburg	WTRE, Inc.	Country/Talk
WTSX-LP	104.9 FM	Kokomo	Table Setter Neighborhood Radio Inc.	Urban
WTTS	92.3 FM	Trafalgar	Sarkes Tarzian, Inc.	Adult album alternative
WUBS	89.7 FM	South Bend	Interfaith Christian Union, Inc.	Urban contemporary gospel
WUBU	102.3 FM	New Carlisle	Sound Management, LLC	Urban adult contemporary
WUME-FM	95.3 FM	Paoli	Diamond Shores Broadcasting, LLC	Adult contemporary
WUZR	105.7 FM	Bicknell	The Original Company, Inc	Country
WVIG	105.5 FM	West Terre Haute	JKO Media Group	Classic country
WVLP-LP	103.1 FM	Valparaiso	Neighbors, Corp.	Variety
WVNI	95.1 FM	Nashville	Brown County Broadcasters, Inc.	Contemporary Christian
WVPE	88.1 FM	Elkhart	Elkhart Community Schools	News/Talk
WVSB	106.3 FM	South Bend	VCY America, Inc.	Christian radio
WVSH	91.9 FM	Huntington	Huntington County Community Sch. Corp.	Grade school
WVUB	91.1 FM	Vincennes	Vincennes University	College
WVUR-FM	95.1 FM	Valparaiso	The Lutheran University Assoc., Inc	College
WVWG	88.9 FM	Seelyville	Bethel Baptist Church	Christian
WWBL	106.5 FM	Washington	Old Northwest Broadcasting, Inc.	Country
WWCA	1270 AM	Gary	Relevant Radio, Inc.	Christian
WWCC-LP	97.3 FM	West Lafayette	Triangle Foundation, Inc.	Contemporary Christian
WWDL	91.3 FM	Plainfield	The Power Foundation	Christian
WWFW	103.9 FM	Fort Wayne	ARG of Fort Wayne LLC	Classic hits
WWKI	100.5 FM	Kokomo	Radio License Holding CBC, LLC	Country
WWQI	91.3 FM	Morristown	The Power Foundation	Christian/The Life FM
WWWY	106.1 FM	North Vernon	White River Broadcasting Co., Inc.	Classic hits
WXCH	102.9 FM	Columbus	Reising Radio Partners Inc.	Classic hits
WXGO	1270 AM	Madison	Dubois County Broadcasting, Inc.	Classic hits
WXKE	96.3 FM	Churubusco	ARG of Fort Wayne LLC	Classic rock
WXKU-FM	92.7 FM	Austin	BK Media, LLC	Country
WXLW	950 AM	Indianapolis	Creative Data Management, Inc.	Talk
WXNT	1430 AM	Indianapolis	Radio License Holding SRC LLC	Sports (ISN)
WXRD	103.9 FM	Crown Point	ARG of Northern Indiana LLC	Classic rock
WXVW	1450 AM	Jeffersonville	Word Broadcasting Network, Inc.	Sports (ISN)
WXXB	102.9 FM	Delphi	Neuhoff Media Lafayette, LLC	Top 40 (CHR)
WXXC	106.9 FM	Marion	Hoosier AM/FM, LLC	Classic hits
WYBV	89.9 FM	Wakarusa	Bible Broadcasting Network, Inc.	Conservative religious (Bible Broadcasting Network)
WYCM	95.7 FM	Attica	CTI License LLC	Country
WYGB	100.3 FM	Edinburgh	Reising Radio Partners, Inc.	News/Talk/Country
WYGS	91.1 FM	Hope	Good Shepherd Radio Inc.	Southern gospel
WYHN	90.1 FM	Washington	Bible Broadcasting Network, Inc.	Religious
WYHX	96.3 FM	Indianapolis	Bible Broadcasting Network, Inc.	Religious
WYIR-LP	96.9 FM	Baugh City	Youth Incorporated of Southern Indiana	Christian rock
WYLJ	107.5 FM	Terre Haute	Terre Haute Seventh-day Adventist Church	Christian (3ABN Radio Network)
WYMR	98.3 FM	Culver	Kankakee Valley Broadcasting Co., Inc	Classic hits
WYRX-FM	94.3 FM	Plymouth	WSJM, Inc.	Mainstream rock
WYRZ-LP	98.9 FM	Brownsburg	Hendricks County Educational Media Corporation	Classic hits
WYTJ	89.3 FM	Linton	Bethel Baptist Church	Christian
WYXB	105.7 FM	Indianapolis	Radio One of Indiana, LLC	Adult contemporary
WYXX	97.7 FM	Goshen	Sound Management, LLC	Classic rock
WZBD	92.7 FM	Berne	Adams County Radio, Inc	Adult contemporary
WZDM	92.1 FM	Vincennes	The Original Company, Inc	Adult contemporary
WZIS-FM	90.7 FM	Terre Haute	Indiana State University Board of Trustees	Variety
WZJR	91.7 FM	Portland	Jayland Radio, Inc.	Classic rock
WZPL	99.5 FM	Greenfield	Radio License Holding SRC LLC	Adult top 40
WZRL	98.3 FM	Plainfield	iHM Licenses, LLC	Mainstream urban
WZVN	107.1 FM	Lowell	ARG of Northern Indiana LLC	Adult contemporary
WZWZ	92.5 FM	Kokomo	Hoosier AM/FM, LLC	Adult contemporary
WZZB	1390 AM	Seymour	Midnight Hour Broadcasting, LLC	Adult contemporary
WZZY	98.3 FM	Winchester	Rodgers Broadcasting Corporation	Adult contemporary

== Defunct ==
- WIBQ
- WJOT
- WLK
- WNAP
