= East Central Indiana =

Region in Indiana

Coordinates: 40.07°N 85.37°W

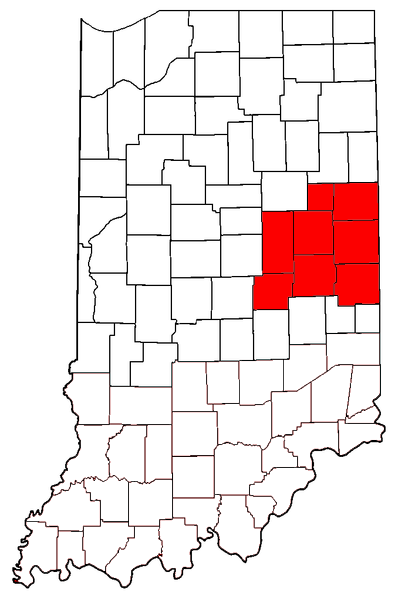
Highlighted in red are the counties of East Central Indiana.

East Central Indiana is a region in Indiana east of Indianapolis, Indiana, and bordering the Ohio state line. The Indiana Gas Boom, which took place during the 1890s, changed much of the area from small agricultural communities to larger cities with economies that included manufacturing. Companies such as Ball Corporation and Overhead Door once had their headquarters in the region. Glass manufacturing was the first industry to be widespread in the area, because of the natural gas. As the glass industry faded, many of the skilled workers became employed at auto parts factories in cities such as Muncie and Anderson. With the decline of the American automobile industry, East Central Indiana became part of the Rust Belt. Many communities have been forced to reinvent themselves with a focus on services or a return to agriculture.

== Counties ==
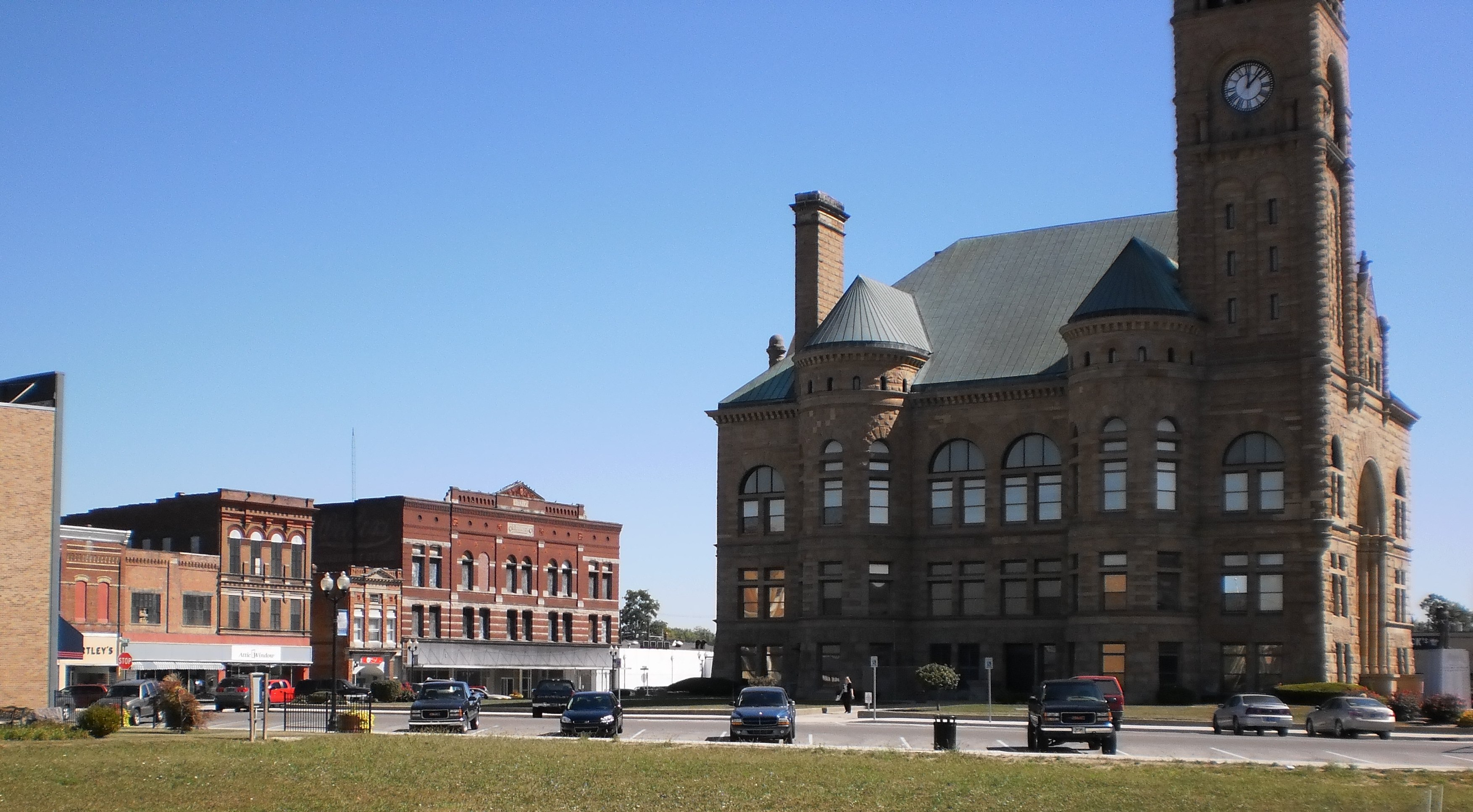
Blackford County courthouse in Hartford City

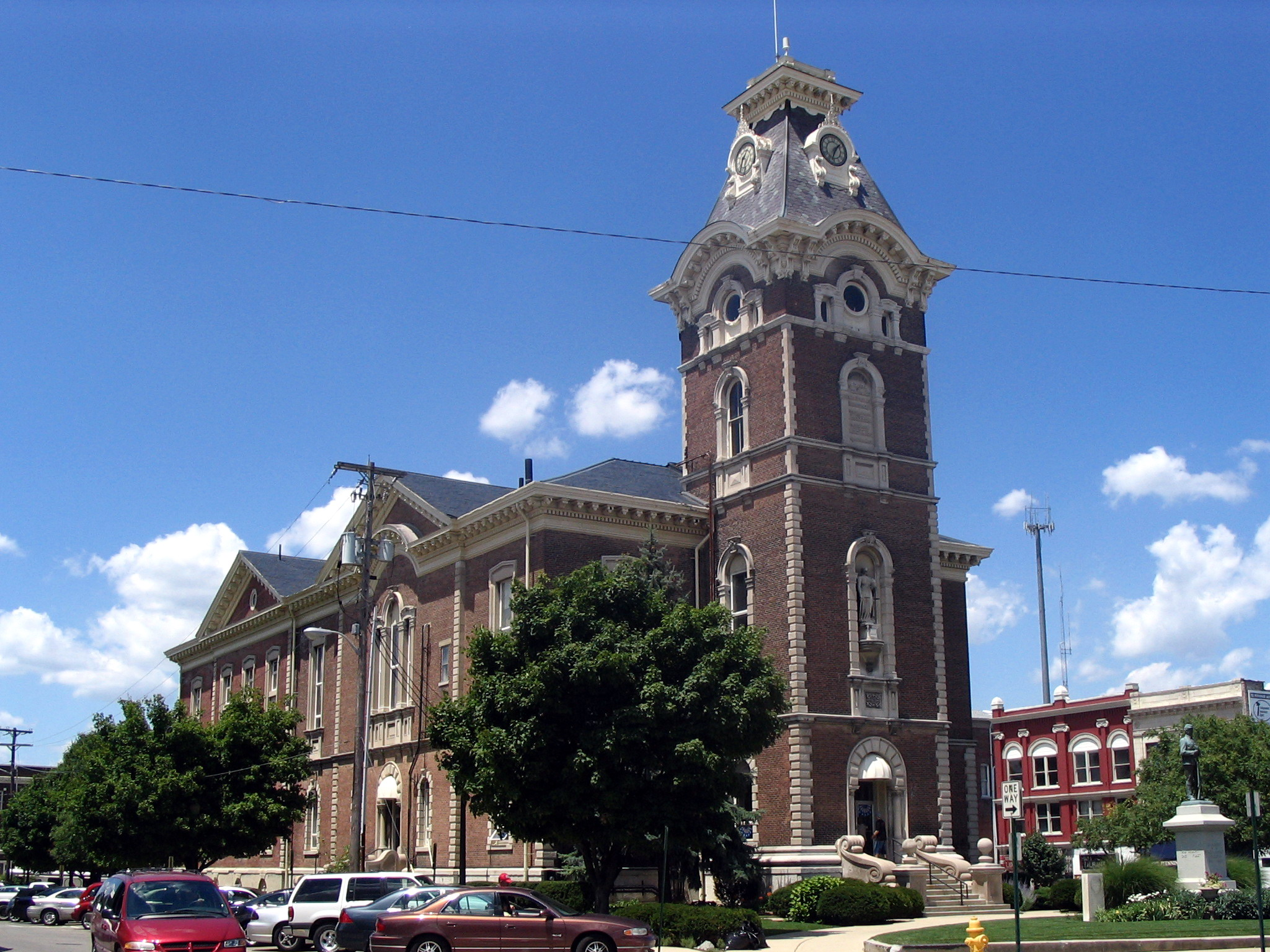
Henry County courthouse in New Castle

- Blackford
- Delaware
- Hancock
- Henry
- Jay
- Madison
- Randolph
- Wayne

== County seats ==
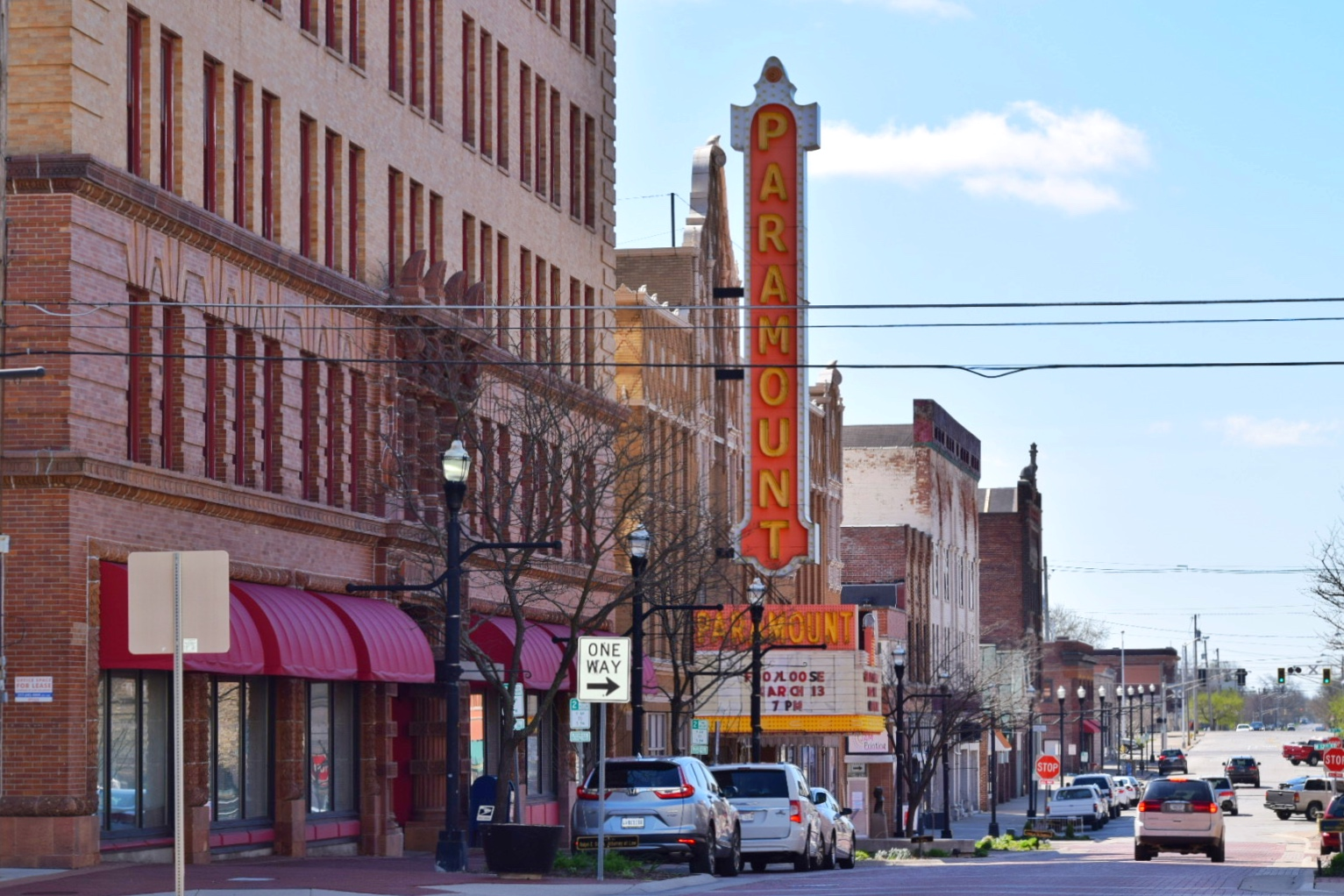
Downtown Anderson

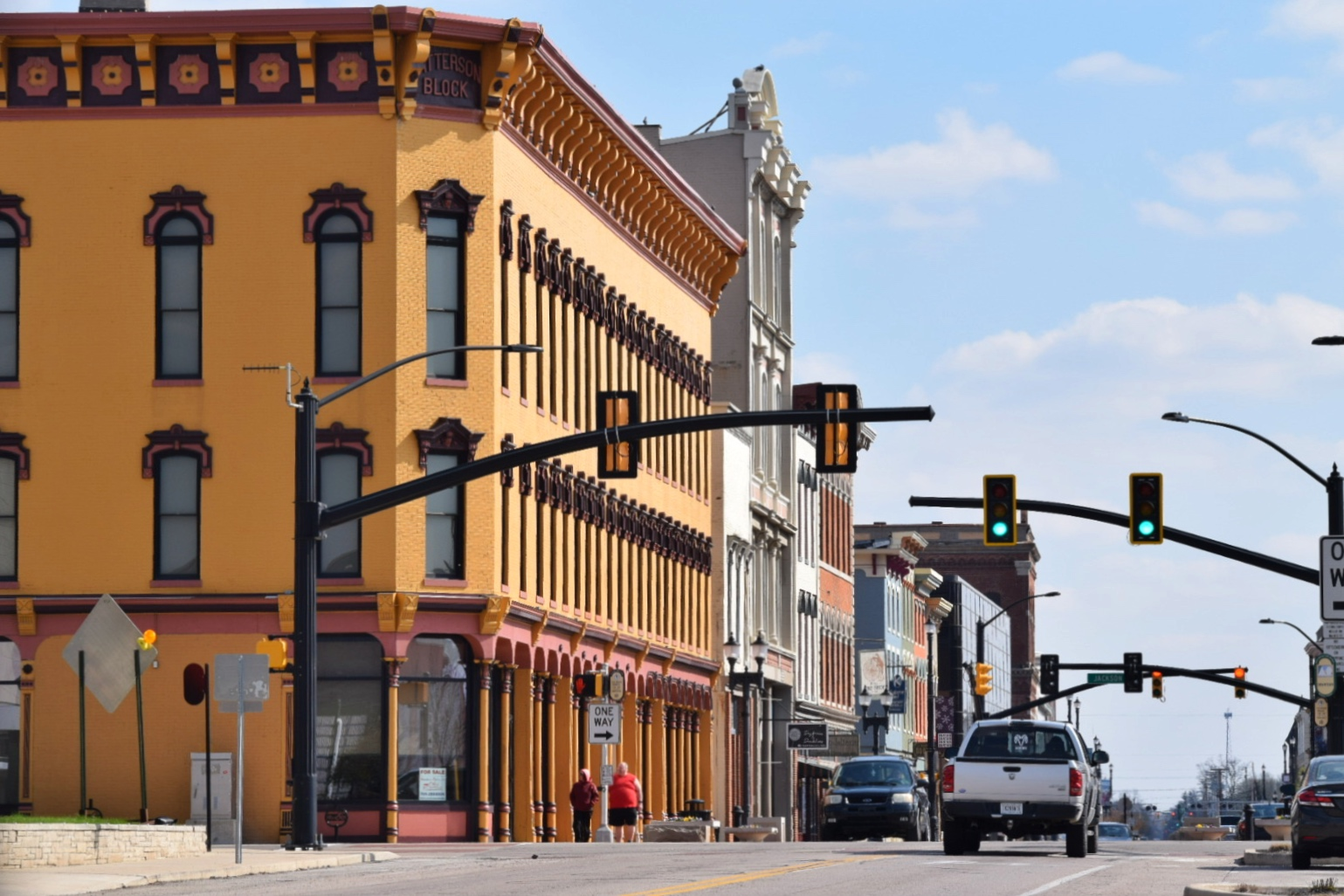
Downtown Muncie

- Anderson (Madison County)
- Greenfield (Hancock County)
- Hartford City (Blackford County)
- Muncie (Delaware County)
- New Castle (Henry County)
- Portland (Jay County)
- Richmond (Wayne County)
- Winchester (Randolph County)

== Notable small towns ==
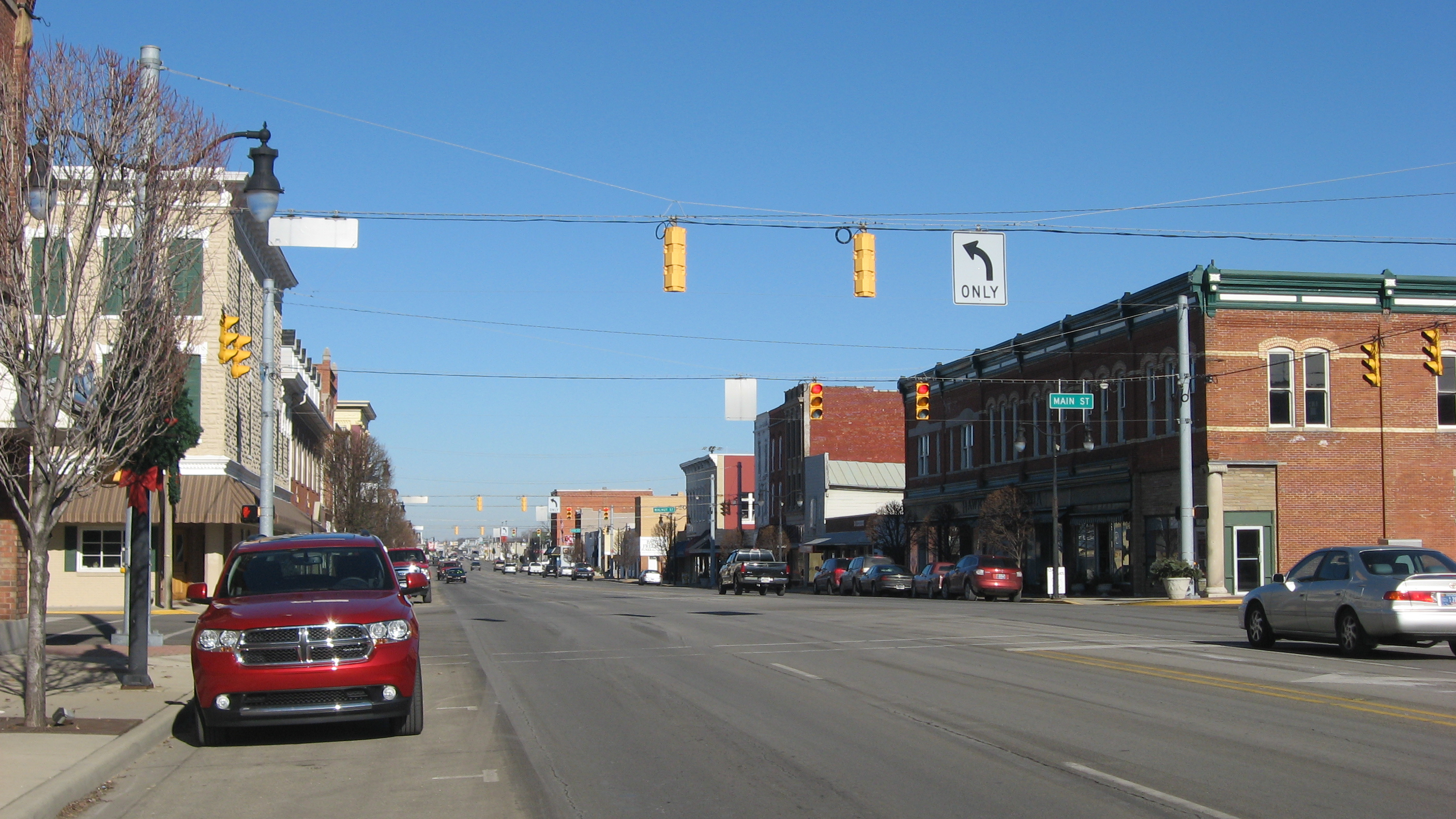
Meridian Street in Portland looking north

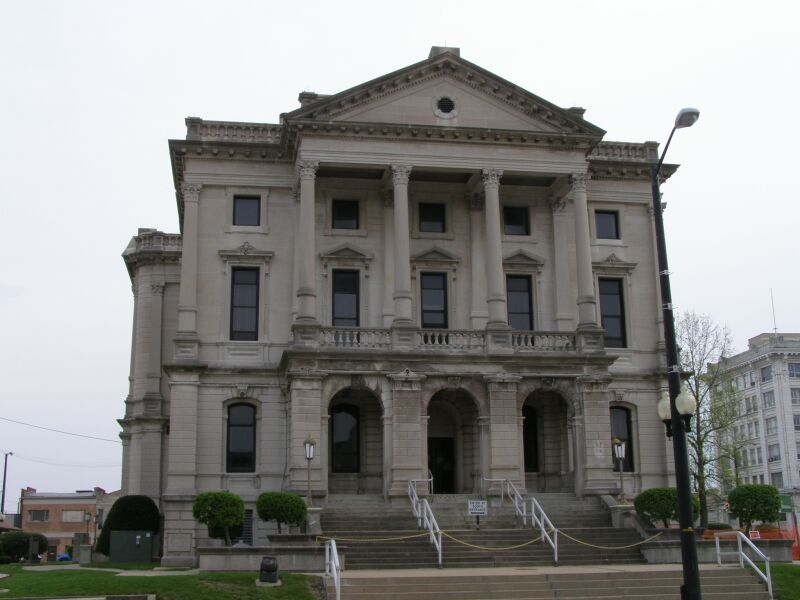
Grant County courthouse in Marion

=== Blackford County ===
- Dunkirk (only a small portion)
- Montpelier
- Roll
- Shamrock Lakes

=== Delaware County ===
- Albany
- Daleville
- Eaton
- Gaston
- Selma
- Yorktown

=== Hancock County ===
- Fortville
- Maxwell
- McCordsville
- New Palestine
- Shirley
- Spring Lake
- Wilkinson

=== Henry County ===
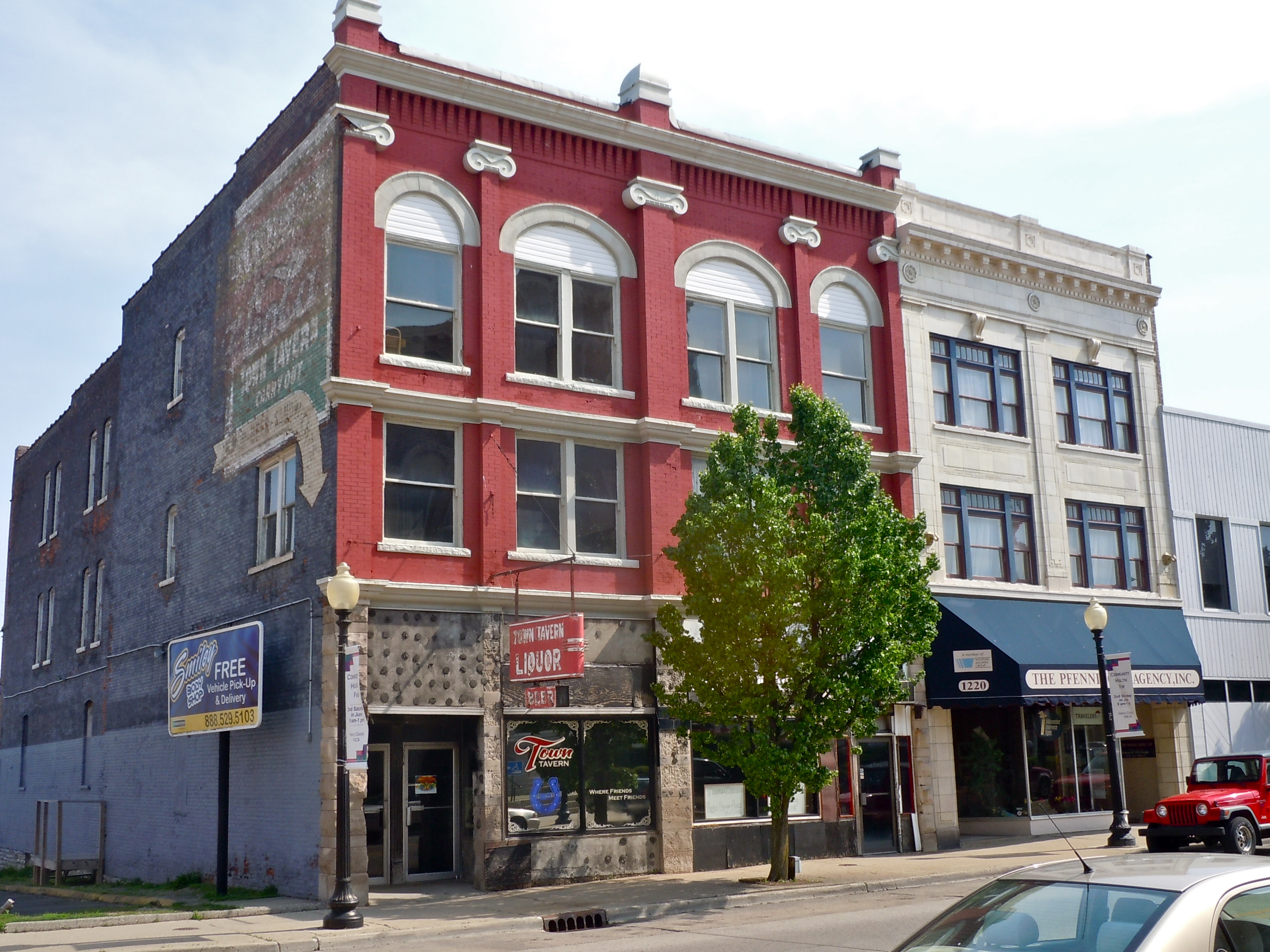
Buildings in the New Castle Commercial Historic District

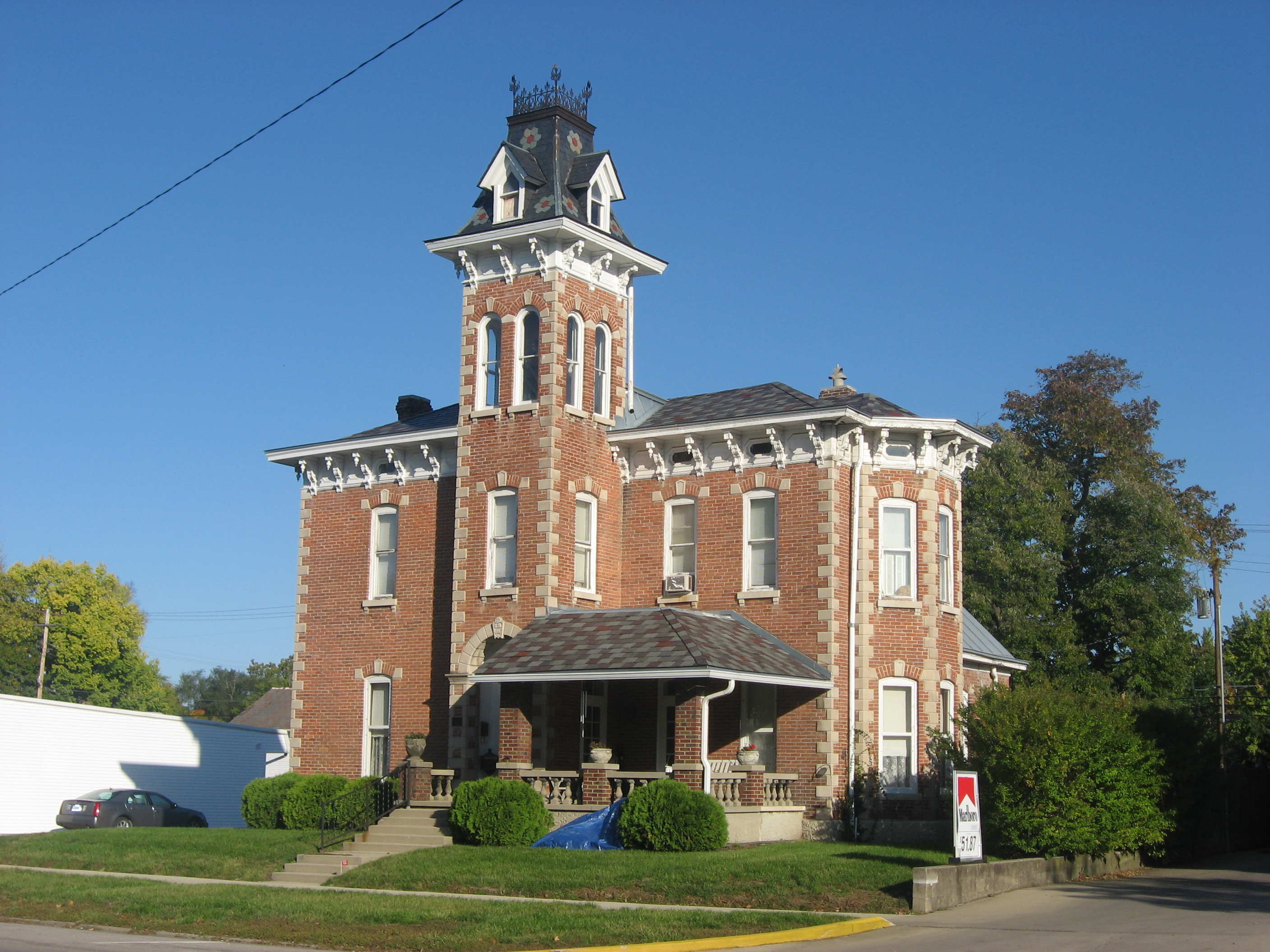
Elias Hinshaw House in Knightstown

- Ashland
- Blountsville
- Cadiz
- Corwin
- Dunreith
- Greensboro
- Hillsboro
- Kennard
- Knightstown
- Knox
- Lewisville
- Middletown
- Millville
- Mooreland
- Mount Summit
- Shirley
- Spiceland
- Springport
- Stone Quarry Mills
- Straughn
- Sulphur Springs

=== Jay County ===
- Bryant
- Pennville
- Redkey
- Salamonia
- Dunkirk

=== Madison County ===
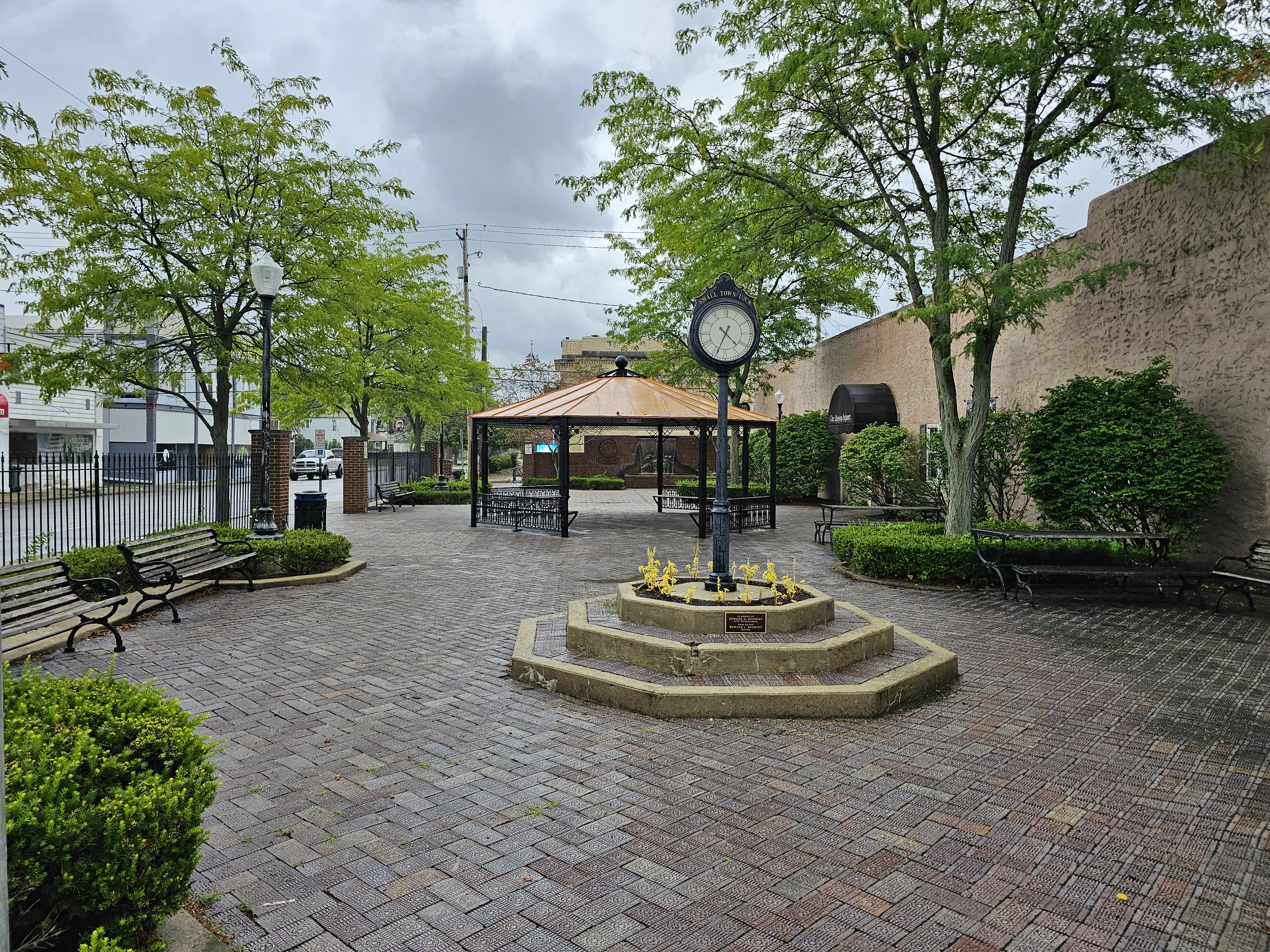
A city park in downtown Alexandria

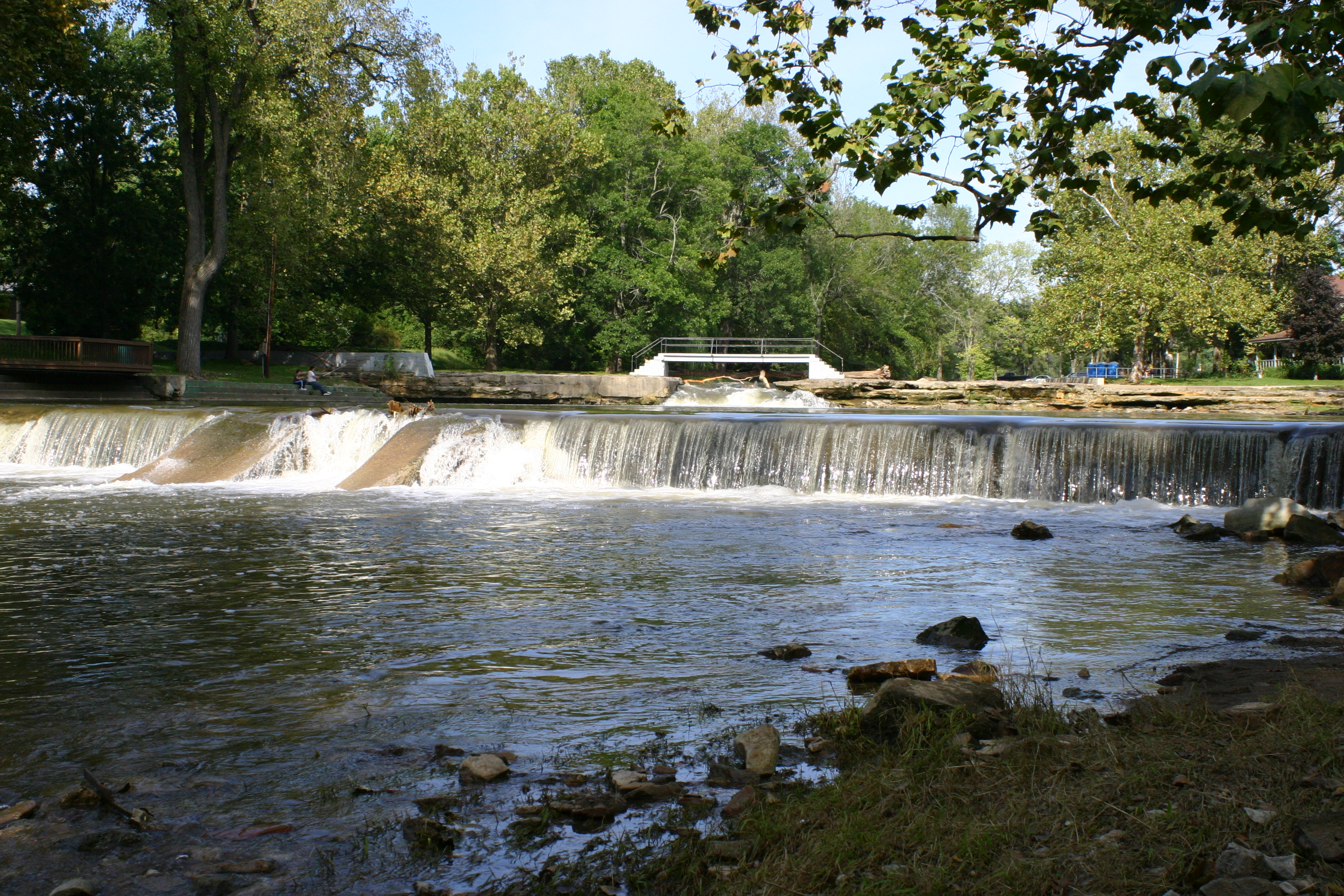
The Falls at Falls Park in Pendleton

- Alexandria
- Chesterfield
- Country Club Heights
- Edgewood
- Elwood
- Frankton
- Ingalls
- Lapel
- Markleville
- Orestes
- Pendleton
- River Forest
- Summitville
- Woodlawn Heights

=== Randolph County ===
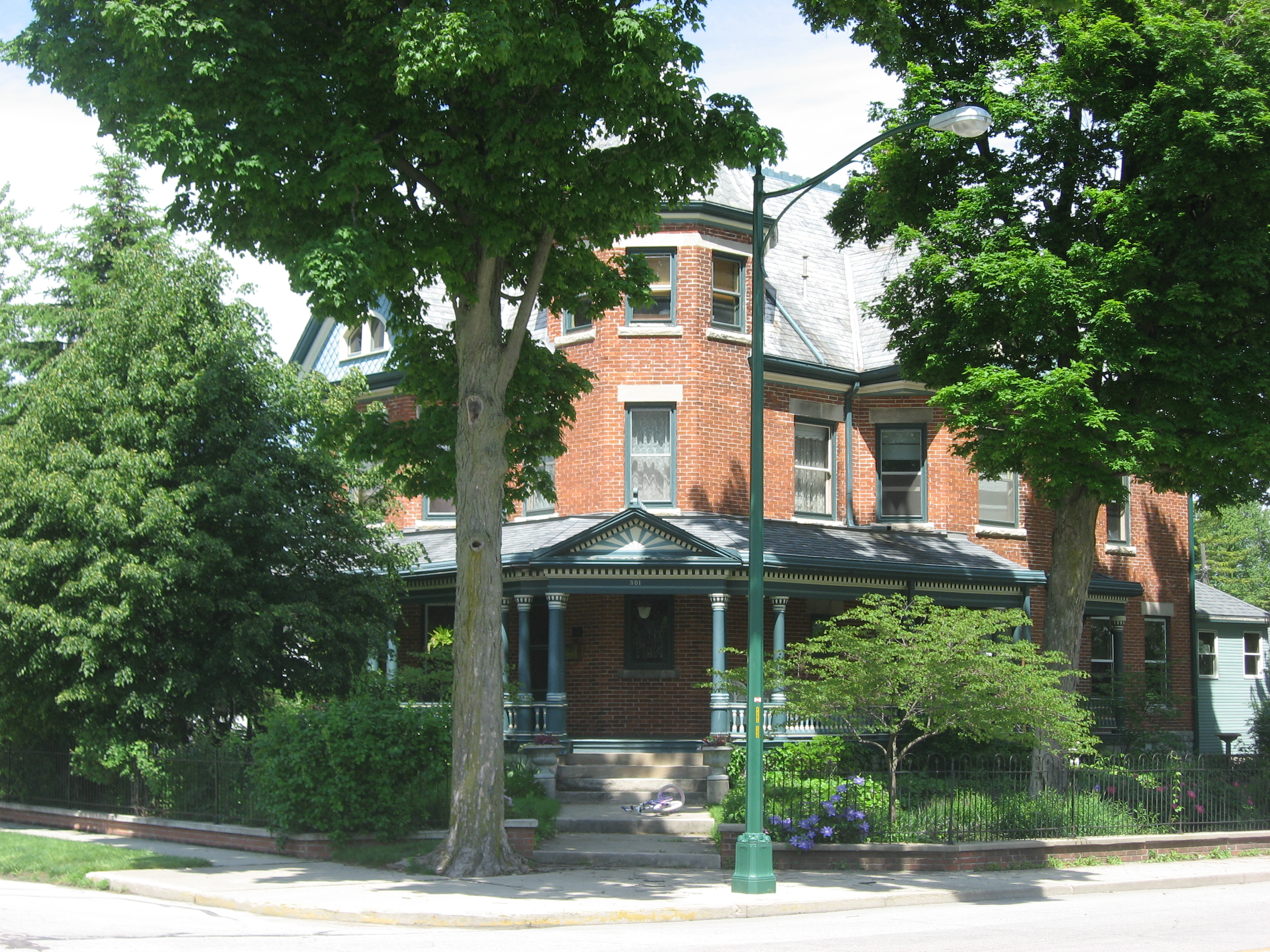
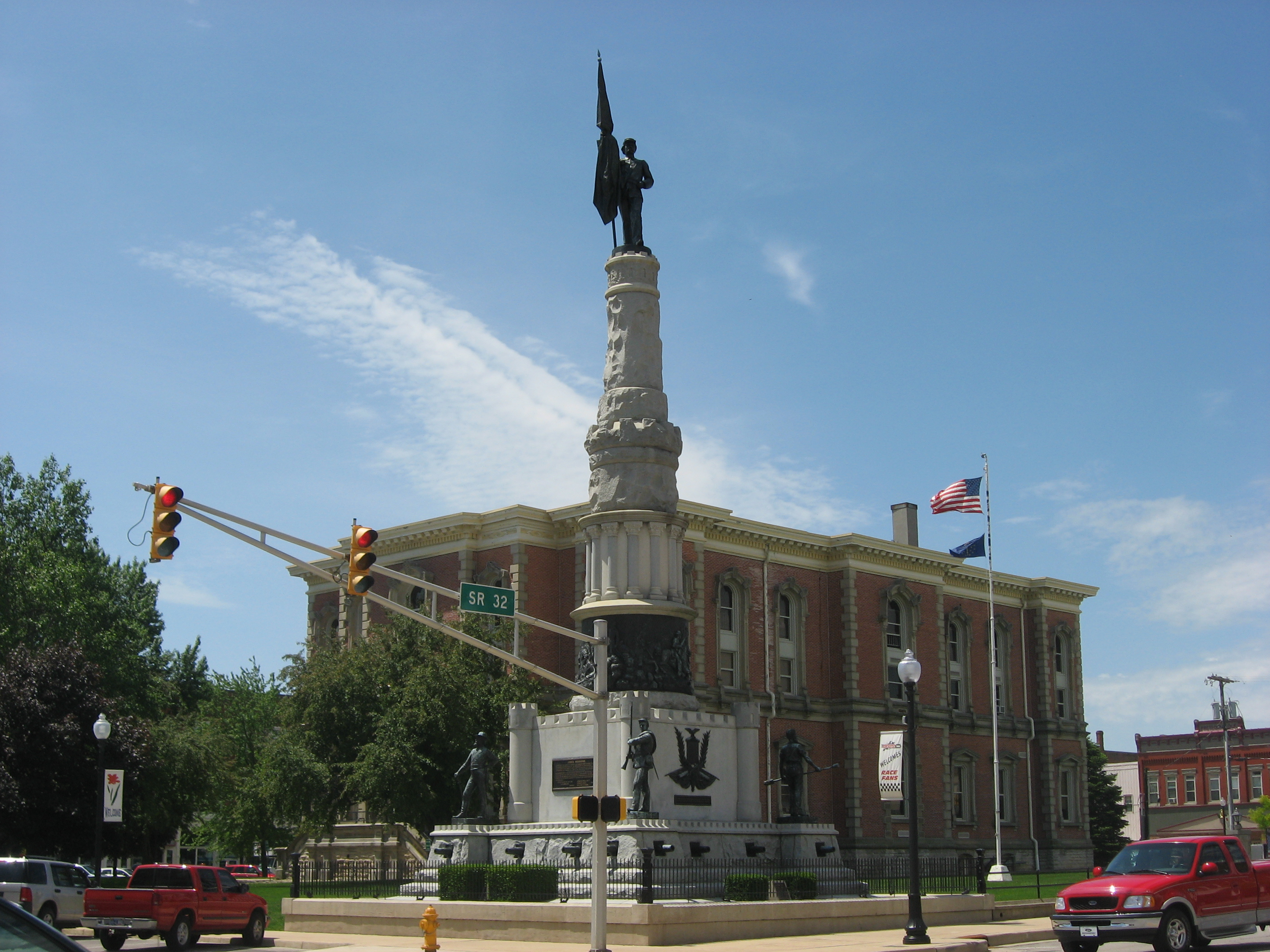
Historic William Kerr House (left) and county courthouse in Randolph County.
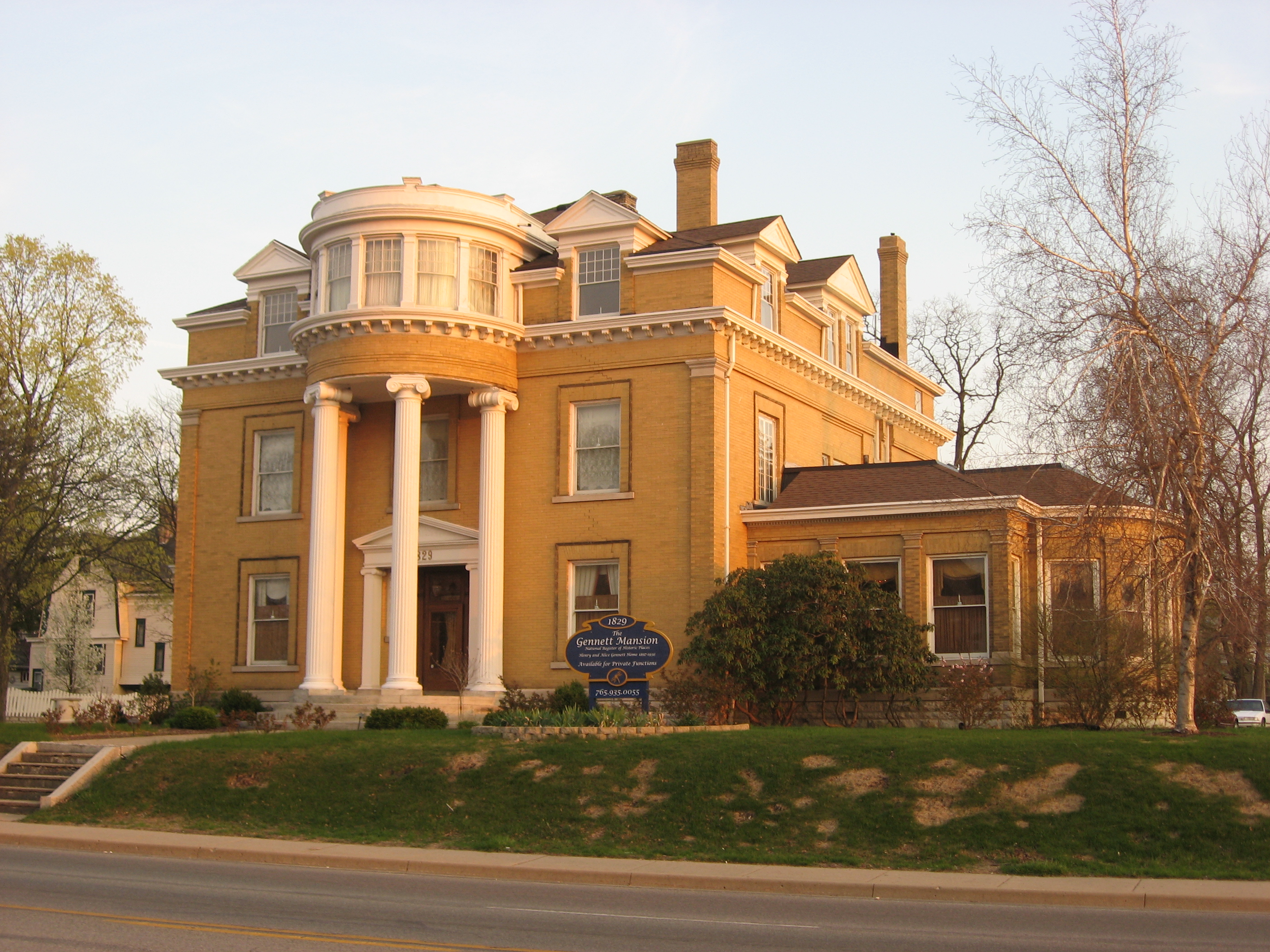
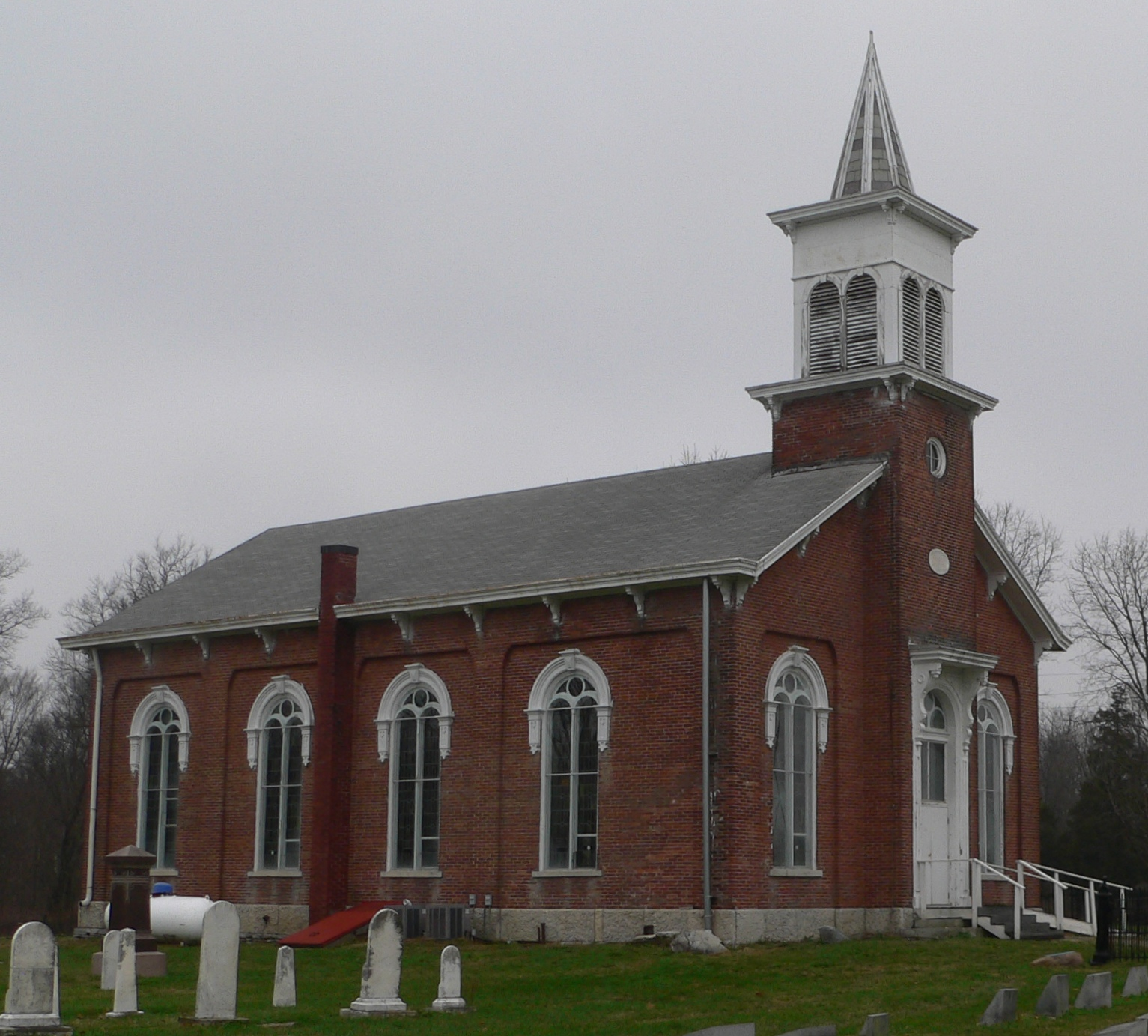
Richmond's historic Henry and Alice Gennett house (left) and historic Doddridge Chapel in Wayne County.
- Farmland
- Losantville
- Lynn
- Modoc
- Parker City
- Ridgeville
- Saratoga
- Union City

=== Wayne County ===
- Abington
- Boston
- Cambridge City
- Centerville
- Dublin
- East Germantown
- Economy
- Fountain City
- Greens Fork
- Hagerstown
- Middleboro
- Milton
- Mount Auburn
- Spring Grove
- Whitewater

== Major newspapers ==
- The Star Press, Muncie, Indiana
- Palladium-Item, Richmond, Indiana
- The Winchester News Gazette, Winchester, Indiana
- The New Castle Courier Times, New Castle, Indiana
- The Herald Bulletin, Anderson, Indiana
- The Commercial Review, Portland, Indiana

== TV stations ==
- WIPB-TV - PBS station in Muncie, Indiana
- WKOI-TV - TBN station in Richmond, Indiana

== Radio stations ==
=== Anderson ===
==== FM stations ====
- WBKQ 96.7 - Country (licensed to Alexandria)
- WGNR 97.9 - Contemporary Christian, Inspirational
- WQME 98.7 - Christian Contemporary (Anderson University)
- WIKL 101.7 - Christian Contemporary/K-Love (licensed to Elwood)

==== AM stations ====
- WHBU 1240 Talk "News Talk 1240 WHBU"
- WGNR 1470 Religious

=== Muncie ===
==== FM stations ====
- WKMV 88.3 FM - Adult contemporary Christian "K-Love"
- WCRD 91.3 FM - Public Radio (Ball State University) "WCRD"
- WBST 92.1 FM (Ball State University) NPR Talk, Classical, Jazz "Indiana Public Radio"
- WMXQ 93.5 FM Classic Rock "93.5 MAXimum Classic Rock"(licensed to Hartford City)
- W231CC 93.9 FM Christian Contemporary
- WNAP-LP 99.1 FM - Southern Gospel
- W268BJ 101.5 FM Adult contemporary Christian "WJCF" (translator of WJCF-FM Morristown, IN)
- W275AJ 102.9FM Simulcast of 1340AM WMUN "Fox Sports Radio"
- WLBC 104.1 FM Hot AC "Today's Best Music"
- WERK 104.9 FM Classic Hits "104.9 WERK The New Sound"
- W291AH 106.1 FM Contemporary Christian (translator of WBCL 90.3 FM in Ft. Wayne)

==== AM stations ====
- WMUN 1340 AM-FOX Sports "102.9FM and 1340AM Fox Sports Radio"

=== New Castle ===
==== FM stations ====
- WKPW 90.7 FM Classic hits "Classic Hits 90.7" (licensed to Knightstown, IN)
- WBSH 91.1 FM NPR, Classical, Jazz Indiana Public Radio (licensed to Hagerstown, IN)
- WMDH-FM 102.5 FM "Hit Country 102.5" Country Music
- WHHC-LP 100.1 FM "Radio 74" Religious

==== AM stations ====
- WLTI 1550 AM Classic Country

=== Richmond ===
==== FM stations ====
- WKRT 89.3 MHz - Adult contemporary Christian "K-Love"
- WECI 91.5 MHz - Public Radio (Earlham College)
- W233AN 94.5 MHz - Contemporary Christian (translator of WJYW Union City) "Joy FM"
- W237AT 95.3 MHz - Adult Contemporary Christian, Inspirational "The Path" (translator of WKCD Cederville, OH)
- WQLK 96.1 MHz - Country "Kicks 96"
- W249BG 97.7 MHz - Contemporary Christian (translator of WJYW Union City) "Joy FM"
- WFMG 101.3 MHz - Hot A/C "G 101-3"
- W269BP 101.7 MHz - Christian rock "Air 1" (translator of WORI Delhi Hills/Cincinnati, OH)

==== AM stations ====
- WHON 930 kHz - News/Talk "News Talk 930" (licensed to Centerville)
- WKBV 1490 kHz - ESPN Sports "ESPN 1490"

=== Winchester ===
==== FM stations ====
- WZZY 98.3 FM Classic hits "Star 98.3"

== Colleges and universities ==
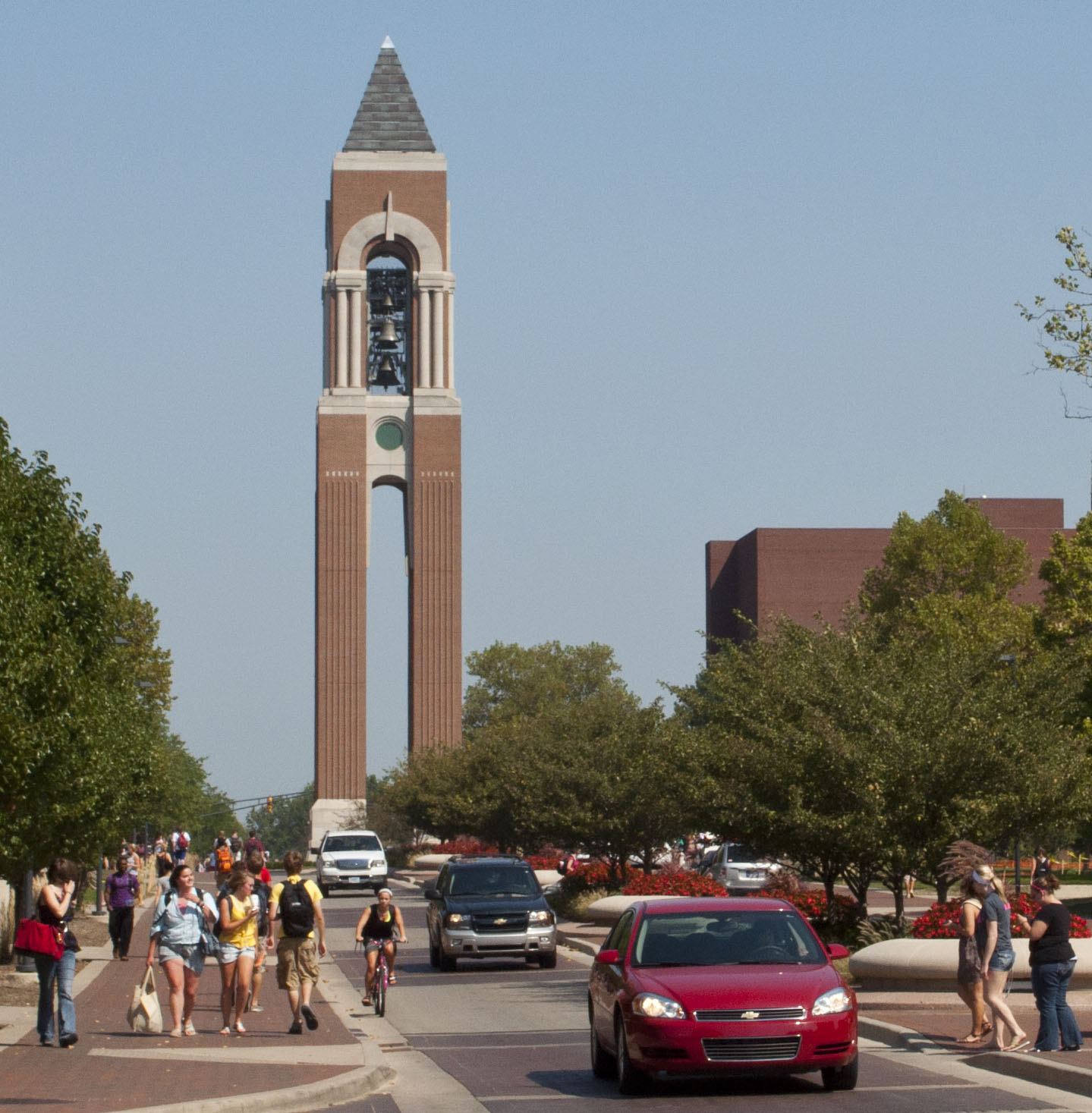
Shafer Tower on the campus of Ball State University, the largest post-secondary education institution in East Central Indiana.

- Anderson University (private)
- Ball State University (public)
- Earlham College (private)
- Indiana University East (public)
- Ivy Tech Community College of Anderson, Muncie, and Richmond (public)

== Public and large private high schools in East Central Indiana ==
=== Blackford County ===
- Blackford High School - Hartford City

=== Delaware County ===
- Cowan High School - Cowan
- Daleville High School - Daleville
- Muncie Burris High School - Muncie
- Indiana Academy for Science, Mathematics, and Humanities - Muncie
- Wapahani High School - Selma
- Wes-Del High School - Gaston
- Yorktown High School - Yorktown
- Muncie Central High School - Muncie
- Delta High School - Eaton

=== Henry County ===
- Blue River Valley High School - Mr. Summit
- Shannondoah High School - Middletown
- Tri High - Lewisville
- New Castle High School - New Castle
- Knightstown High School - Knightstown

=== Jay County ===
- Jay County High School - Portland

=== Madison County ===
- Alexandria-Monroe High School-Alexandria
- Anderson High School-Anderson
- Anderson Preparatory Academy - Anderson
- Liberty Christian -Anderson
- Pendleton Heights High School-Pendleton
- Lapel High School-Lapel
- Frankton High School-Frankton
- Elwood Community High School-Elwood

=== Randolph County ===
- Union High School (Modoc)-Modoc
- Randolph Southern High School-Lynn
- Winchester Community High School-Winchester
- Union City High School-Union City
- Monroe Central High School-Parker City

=== Wayne County Indiana ===
- Hagerstown High School-Hagerstown High School
- Lincoln High School-Cambridge City
- Centerville High School-Centerville
- Richmond High School-Richmond
- Northeastern High School-Fountain City

== Notes and references ==
Notes

Cited works

- Glass, James A.; Kohrman, David (2005). The Gas Boom of East Central Indiana. Image of America. Charleston, SC: Arcadia. ISBN 978-0-7385-3963-8. OCLC 61885891.
- Grant, Tina (2005). International directory of company histories, Volume 70. Chicago: St. James Press. ISBN 978-1-55862-545-7. OCLC 224417874.
- Hamilton, Kristi; Abraham, Kent; Lankford, Susan (2005). "National Register of Historic Places Nomination: Hartford City Courthouse Square District" (PDF). Indiana Department of Natural Resources. National Park Service. Archived from the original (PDF) on 2012-10-10.
- Unlisted (Biographical and historical record...) (1887). Biographical and historical record of Jay and Blackford Counties, Indiana: Containing ... portraits and biographies of some of the prominent men of the state: engravings of prominent citizens in Jay and Blackford Counties, with personal histories of many of the leading families and a concise history of Jay and Blackford Counties and their cities and villages. Chicago: The Lewis Publishing Company. OCLC 15560416.
