= WLBC =

WLBC may refer to:

== Radio and television ==
- WLBC-FM, an FM radio station in Muncie, Indiana, US
- WLBC-TV, the original name of WIPB, a television station in Muncie, Indiana, US
- WLBC (AM), the original name of WMUN, an AM radio station in Muncie, Indiana, US

== Other uses ==
- UDP-2-acetamido-2-deoxy-ribo-hexuluronate aminotransferase or WlbC, an enzyme
- Word of Life Bible Church, a Pentecostal Christian megachurch located in Warri, Nigeria
