= WBPE =

WBPE may refer to:

- WBPE (FM), a radio station (95.3 FM) licensed to serve Brookston, Indiana, United States
- UDP-2-acetamido-2-deoxy-ribo-hexuluronate aminotransferase, an enzyme
- WBPE, branding for a former cable-only service of WHOI, in Peoria, Illinois
