= WKHL =

WKHL may refer to:

- West Kootenay Hockey League
- WKHL (FM) a radio station (92.1 FM) licensed to serve Palmyra, Pennsylvania, United States
- WARW (FM), a radio station (96.7 FM) licensed to serve Port Chester, New York, United States, which held the call sign WKHL from 1992 to 2006
- WLQQ, a radio station (106.7 FM) licensed to serve West Lafayette, Indiana, United States, which held the call sign WKHL from 2008 to 2018
