= WBSB =

WBSB may refer to:

- WBSB (FM), a radio station (89.5 FM) licensed to Anderson, Indiana, United States.
- WZFT, a radio station (104.3 FM) licensed to Baltimore, Maryland, United States, which held the call sign WBSB from 1980 to 1993.
- World Buddhist Scout Brotherhood.
- The ICAO airport code for Brunei International Airport.
