= WAXT =

WAXT may refer to:

- WAXT-LP, a radio station (98.9 FM) licensed to Whitehall, Michigan
- WBKQ, a radio station (96.7 FM) licensed to Alexandria, Indiana, which held the call sign WAXT from 1980 to 1999
