= WHTI (disambiguation) =

WHTI is a radio station (105.7 FM) licensed to Salem, West Virginia.

WHTI may also refer to:

- Western Hemisphere Travel Initiative, a United States travel agreement with other North American nations
- WJSR, a radio station (100.9 FM) licensed to Lakeside, Virginia, which held the call sign WHTI from 2010 to 2016
- WBKQ, a radio station (96.7 FM) licensed to Alexandria, Indiana, which held the call sign WHTI from 1999 to 2009
