= Reid Health =

Health system in Indiana

Geography
- Location: Richmond, Indiana, United States

Organization
- Care system: Non-profit
- Type: Regional health system

Services
- Emergency department: Yes
- Beds: 189

History
- Founded: 1905

Links
- Website: https://www.reidhealth.org
- Lists: Hospitals in Indiana

Reid Health is a regional non-profit health system serving East Central Indiana and West Central Ohio in the United States. Headquartered in Richmond, Indiana, the system includes a 189-bed inpatient hospital and more than 50 satellite facilities across seven counties. Reid Health employs over 3,100 staff members, including more than 170 providers representing over 40 specialties and sub-specialties.

In 2026, Healthgrades named Reid Health among America's 250 Best Hospitals.

== History ==
Reid Health originated as Reid Memorial Hospital, which opened in 1905 following financial backing from industrialist Daniel G. Reid. His business partner William B. Leeds, along with the estates of Robert Morrison and James M. Starr, also contributed to the hospital's establishment. Reid financed the hospital in memory of his wife and son, helping address growing healthcare needs in the Richmond area. Throughout the 20th century, the hospital expanded its services and facilities. In 1992, the organization adopted the name Reid Hospital and Health Care Services to reflect its broader healthcare offerings. On September 10, 2008, Reid relocated from its original campus to a newly constructed hospital facility in Richmond, representing a major modernization effort.

In 2015, the system rebranded as Reid Health to "emphasize its regional health and wellness focus". In July 2019, Reid Health acquired a substantial portion of the assets of the former Fayette Regional Health System in Connersville, Indiana, after Fayette Regional entered bankruptcy. In September 2022, Reid Health announced plans to build a new campus in Connersville, Indiana.

== Organization and facilities ==
Reid Health operates its main hospital campus in Richmond, Indiana, supported by outpatient clinics, specialty centers, and community facilities throughout East Central Indiana and West Central Ohio.

== See also ==
- List of hospitals in the United States
- Healthcare in the United States
