= WMQX (disambiguation) =

WMQX may refer to:

- WLMZ-FM, a radio station (102.3 FM) licensed to serve Pittston, Pennsylvania, United States, which held the call sign WMQX from 2015 to 2023
- WBKQ, a radio station (96.7 FM) licensed to serve Alexandria, Indiana, United States, which held the call sign WMQX from 2009 to 2014
- WPAW, a radio station (93.1 FM) licensed to serve Greensboro, North Carolina, United States, which held the call sign WMQX-FM from 1987 to 2006
- WPOL, a radio station (1340 AM) licensed to serve Winston-Salem, North Carolina, which held the call sign WMQX from 1987 to 1995
