= WITZ-FM =

- Jasper, Indiana; United States
- Frequency: 104.7 MHz
- Branding: WITZ FM 104.7

Programming
- Language: English
- Format: Adult contemporary
- Affiliations: Fox News Radio, Motor Racing Network

Ownership
- Owner: Jasper on the Air, Inc.
- Sister stations: WITZ, WQKZ

History
- First air date: October 29, 1954 (71 years ago)

Technical information
- Licensing authority: FCC
- Facility ID: 30584
- Class: B
- ERP: 50,000 watts
- HAAT: 119 meters (390 ft)
- Transmitter coordinates: 38°21′2.2″N 86°56′26″W

Links
- Public license information: Public file; LMS
- Website: www.witzamfm.com
- WITZ
- Jasper, Indiana; United States
- Frequency: 990 kHz
- Branding: Juan 99.1 & 990

Programming
- Language: Spanish
- Format: Regional Mexican

Ownership
- Owner: Jasper on the Air, Inc.

History
- First air date: April 4, 1948 (78 years ago)

Technical information
- Facility ID: 30853
- Class: D
- Power: 1,000 watts day; 6 watts night
- Transmitter coordinates: 38°21′2.2″N 86°56′26″W
- Translator: 99.1 W256DA (Jasper)

Links
- Public license information: Public file; LMS

WITZ-FM (104.7 FM) and WITZ (990 AM) are radio stations broadcasting an adult contemporary music format on FM and a Regional Mexican format on AM. Licensed to Jasper, Indiana, United States, the stations are owned by Jasper on the Air, Inc. and feature programming from Fox News Radio and Motor Racing Network.

WITZ began broadcasting on July 4, 1948. WITZ added an FM station on October 29, 1954 and held its dedication event just a few days later on November 1.
