= WLQQ =

Radio station in West Lafayette, Indiana

- West Lafayette, Indiana; United States
- Broadcast area: Lafayette metropolitan area
- Frequency: 106.7 MHz (HD Radio)
- Branding: Q106.7

Programming
- Format: Adult contemporary
- Subchannels: HD2: Classic hip-hop; HD3: Soft AC

Ownership
- Owner: Woof Boom Radio (J. Chapman); (Woof Boom Radio Lafayette LLC)
- Sister stations: WBKQ, WHBU, WLBC-FM, WMUN, WMXQ

History
- First air date: June 15, 1992
- Former call signs: WXAW (1991–1992); WGLM (1992–2008); WKHL (2008–2018)

Technical information
- Licensing authority: FCC
- Facility ID: 35842
- Class: A
- ERP: 6,000 watts
- HAAT: 100 meters (330 ft)
- Transmitter coordinates: 40.522°N 86.983°W

Links
- Public license information: Public file; LMS
- Webcast: Listen live
- Website: lafayetteq1067.com

WLQQ (106.7 FM) is a commercial radio station licensed to West Lafayette, Indiana, United States. Owned by Woof Boom Radio, it broadcasts an adult contemporary format branded as "Q106.7". Studios and offices are located on Main Street in Lafayette, Indiana.

WLQQ's transmitter is in rural northwestern Tippecanoe County on North 400 West. In addition to a standard analog transmission, WLQQ is available online.

== History ==
=== AC and Hot AC ===
At 7 a.m. on June 15, 1992, the station signed on as WGLM. It was founded by KVB Broadcasting under Kelly Vaughan Busch. WGLM began with a full-service adult contemporary format focusing on music, hourly news updates, sports, weather and community updates throughout the day. The first song played on WGLM was "Wicked Game" by Chris Isaak. The original staff members included Busch, Ron Schuessler, Dan McKay, Paul Poteet, and Collin Stewart.

Throughout the 1990s the station rated highly with its primary demographic, females 25–54, and continued to focus on the "Community Radio" mission. WASK eventually bowed out of the AC/MOR race when their parent company purchased the now-defunct WIIZ in 1994 in favor of simulcast news/talk programming.

WGLM ran for many years, which led to one of the market's heritage Top 40 stations, WAZY, flipping to hot adult contemporary, a more upbeat version of the format WGLM was running. WGLM's ratings among 12+ listeners took a hit from WAZY's new format; however, WGLM still remained strong with females 25–54. Despite this, competition between WAZY-FM and WGLM increased and in 2000 WGLM dropped the "Community Radio" moniker in favor of "The Best Mix of Music". In addition, WGLM brought new imaging to the station and segued to a "brighter" adult contemporary format to go head-to-head against WAZY-FM. WGLM began adding rhythmic crossover records to its evening and overnight programming, but the station remained "at-work friendly" during prime-time hours.

In 2001, RadioWorks' newly acquired oldies station, which was called WNJY Delphi, moved its tower into rural northeastern Tippecanoe County and switched to Top 40 as WXXB, The New B 102.9. This made three top 40 or top 40-leaning stations in the market. As a result of this, and a poor rating period, WGLM return to its adult contemporary roots. The new sound was described as Soft Rock 106.7 in February 2002. Jones Radio Networks' syndicated night show, Delilah, was heard twice a week. Theme weekends, which had been a staple on the station from the beginning, were dropped. Soft Rock 106.7 ended in late September 2004. The entire air staff was dismissed, with the exception of Rick Mummey.

WGLM changed its programming to hot adult contemporary on September 25, 2004, at 8 pm, starting with The Mix 106.7. Programming consisted of Rick Mummey in the morning with the rest of the day supplied by Westwood One's Bright AC 24/7 format. With the station was all satellite-delivered, except for morning drive time, the ratings continued to slide.

In mid-2007, The Mix 106.7 underwent a re-image that included a new interactive website, jingles, liners, and a programming restructure under the supervision of Operations Manager Ken Stapleton. Programming from Dial Global's Bright AC remained. As a result, WGLM saw substantial gains with females 18–34 and 25–34, according to Arbitron's Fall 2007 ratings, reaching the #1 spot in both categories.

=== Christian Contemporary ===
On February 13, 2008, KVB Broadcasting Managing Partner Kelly Busch announced the sale of WGLM to the Educational Media Foundation, which planned to replace the commercial hot adult contemporary format with listener-supported, non-commercial Contemporary Christian music. The Mix 106.7 signed off at 12:01 am on February 29, 2008, ending nearly 16 years of adult contemporary programming. The Educational Media Foundation began airing their K-LOVE format at 4 o'clock that morning. The last song played on WGLM as a commercial station in 2008 was the album version of "Closing Time" by Semisonic.

On August 15, 2008, EMF changed the station's call letters to WKHL to better reflect the station's on-air identity. WKHL was nearly all network-programmed. The station only aired local programming targeted to West Lafayette on its Closer Look program.

The WGLM call sign had been requested for the AM 1380 and FM 106.3 radio stations in Greenville, Michigan (currently WSCG), as part of the stations' sale to new owners.

=== WLQQ ===
On February 1, 2018, J. Chapman's Woof Boom Radio purchased WKHL from EMF for $608,000. The call letters were switched to WLQQ. On February 6, 2018, WLQQ returned the adult contemporary format to the 106.7 frequency. The station was branded as "Q106.7".

In September 2018, Lafayette native Gina Quattrocchi joined Q106.7, bringing her experience in local media to the station. She highlighted her interest in engaging with the local community through her role.
