= WCRD =

- Muncie, Indiana; United States
- Broadcast area: East Central Indiana
- Frequency: 91.3 MHz

Programming
- Format: Alternative and Indie

Ownership
- Owner: Ball State University

History
- First air date: 1950
- Former call signs: WWHI (1950–2022)
- Call sign meaning: "Cardinal Radio Dave" as a momento to David Letterman, who went by Cardinal Radio Dave during his time at WCRD (WWHI) as a student.

Technical information
- Licensing authority: FCC
- Facility ID: 47007
- Class: A
- ERP: 380 watts
- HAAT: 40.6 meters
- Transmitter coordinates: 40°12′3.10″N 85°24′30.20″W

Links
- Public license information: Public file; LMS
- Webcast: Listen live
- Website: wcrd.net

WCRD (91.3 FM) is a non-commercial radio station operated by students of Ball State University in Muncie, Indiana. The station is operated out of the David Letterman Communication and Media Building on the Ball State University campus.

== Departments ==
WCRD has eight student-lead departments under the General Manager Maria Nevins and Assistant General Manager Zack Vance These include:

1. Production
2. Promotions
3. Weather
4. Sports
5. Social Media
6. Programming
7. Music
8. News

== History ==
WCRD was licensed as WWHI on October 15, 1950. It was the radio station of Wilson Junior High School. It broadcast on 91.5 MHz with 10 watts. The power was increased in 1968 beyond the original 10 watts.

In 1971, the station, including its transmitter tower, was transferred to Muncie Southside High School. Five years later, an allocation change affecting various FM stations in the Muncie area resulted in a move to 91.3.

Meanwhile, WCRD began its operations as a carrier current AM radio station on the Ball State campus in 1986. On March 13, 1995, WCRD programs began being broadcast on WWHI outside of school hours.

In 2005, WCRD obtained the license for WWHI for one dollar from Muncie Community Schools, allowing the station to broadcast beyond their carrier circuit. In the fall of 2008, a new broadcasting antenna was installed atop the West Quad building smokestack on the Ball State campus, allowing a greater broadcasting range. In 2015, with the antenna failing and plans to dismantle the unused smokestack, this antenna was replaced with a new one on top of the Teacher's College building. The new antenna was installed in late 2015 and powered up on February 29, 2016, one hour after the previous site was powered down.

A live stream of the station is also available on WCRD's website as well as the RadioFX app. A live web camera in the WCRD studio was added Fall 2008. This allows online listeners to view the DJ and guests in the studio. The camera was turned off following website updates in 2012.

In 2012, WCRD introduced a mascot, the Wild Crazy Radio Dude. The Radio Dude could be found at WCRD events as well as out and about campus multiple days of the week. This mascot was discontinued in 2014.

On January 26, 2022, WWHI formally became WCRD.

== Programs ==
WCRD broadcasts a variety of music programs, ranging from music originating from the 1950s to today's top hits. Student-run shows air seven days a week anytime between 7 AM and 2 AM. WCRD simulcasts Newslink Indiana's newscast Monday through Thursday at 9 PM.

== Awards ==
Since 2003, WCRD has won several awards, including more than 20 Communicator Awards from the Academy of Interactive & Visual Arts, awards from the Indiana Association of School Broadcasters' College Competition, the Society of Professional Journalists (Indiana Chapter), Indiana Broadcasters Association, and an ADDY Award from the American Advertising Federation. In the fall of 2015, and again in 2017, WCRD was named the IASB College Radio Station of the Year.

In addition, WCRD was nominated for a 2009 MTVU Woodie Award. The station was voted the Best in the Midwest and placed among the Top Five in the country. WCRD was again nominated for a college radio Woodie in 2014 and placed in the top 5 of all college radio stations in the country.

Previous logo

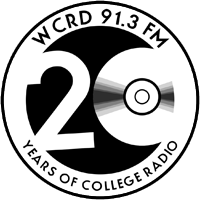
WCRD 20th anniversary logo.

Previous logo (2007-October 2010)

Previous Logo (Logo used until 2012)

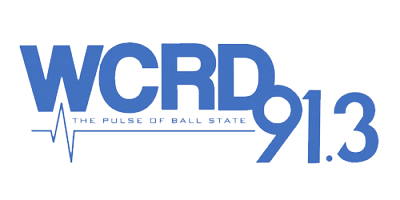
Previous WCRD logo from fall 2012 through May 2017

== See also ==
- Campus radio
- List of college radio stations in the United States
