= WZJR =

- Portland, Indiana; United States
- Broadcast area: East Central Indiana
- Frequency: 91.7 MHz
- Branding: The Voice Of Jayland

Programming
- Format: Classic rock

Ownership
- Owner: Jayland Radio, Inc.

History
- First air date: December 1996 (as WBSJ)
- Former call signs: WBSJ (1996–2020)

Technical information
- Licensing authority: FCC
- Facility ID: 3647
- Class: A
- ERP: 2,000 watts
- HAAT: 67 meters (220 ft)
- Transmitter coordinates: 40°24′26″N 85°02′15″W

Links
- Public license information: Public file; LMS
- Website: wzjrradio.com

WZJR (91.7 FM) is a radio station in Portland, Indiana. It was originally established in 1996 as WBSJ by Ball State University It primarily featured National Public Radio programming. The transmitter for WBSJ failed in January 2019. Ball State University, the license owner, chose not to replace it due to cost. In April 2020, Ball State University announced its intention to sell WBSJ to Jayland Radio, Inc. for $40,702.43; the sale was consummated on August 31, 2020.
