= WERK =

Radio station in Muncie, Indiana

Muncie, Indiana; United States
- Broadcast area: Muncie-Marion
- Frequency: 104.9 MHz
- Branding: 104.9 WERK-FM

Programming
- Format: Classic hits

Ownership
- Owner: Woof Boom Radio Muncie License LLC
- Sister stations: WMXQ, WLBC-FM, WBKQ, WHBU, WMUN, WLQQ

History
- First air date: January 16, 1986; 40 years ago (as WOKZ)

Technical information
- Licensing authority: FCC
- Facility ID: 1723
- Class: A
- ERP: 6,000 watts
- HAAT: 100 meters (330 ft)
- Transmitter coordinates: 40°9′19.00″N 85°25′48.00″W

Links
- Public license information: Public file; LMS
- Webcast: Listen Live
- Website: WERKFM.net

WERK (104.9 MHz) is a commercial FM radio station in Muncie, Indiana, serving the Muncie and Marion area. It broadcasts a classic hits radio format and is owned by Woof Boom Radio Muncie License LLC.

== History ==
The station signed on as WOKZ "KZ 105" on January 16, 1986. It aired an adult contemporary and oldies format. The station's creation was delayed by a series of interference concerns that led to three stations changing frequencies. To make way for WOKZ, WWHC at Hartford City and WXUS of Lafayette moved to 93.5, while WZWZ in Kokomo was relocated to 92.7, all at the new station's expense. The original owner, James Beatty's L&B Broadcasting of Indianapolis, bought out competing applicants Hoosier's Favorite Station and Ben-Del Broadcasting to obtain the construction permit.

In 1991, Beatty sold WOKZ and WERK (990 AM) to American Hometown Radio. The new owners changed WOKZ's call letters to WERK-FM. At first, it stunted as "Louie 105" with a loop of "Louie Louie". The station relaunched as "Oldies 105" on November 20.

American Hometown sold the pair of stations in 1997 to Dream Weaver Broadcasting. Dream Weaver divested the AM station two years later by donating the license.

In 2013, Woof Boom Radio acquired WERK from Backyard Broadcasting along with the rest of its Muncie cluster for $4.45 million. On December 26, 2014, after its annual stint of airing Christmas music, WERK relaunched as "The New Sound". The format features pop, rock, and disco tunes from 1975 to 2012, with an emphasis on the 1980s.
