= WMXQ =

- Hartford City, Indiana; United States
- Broadcast area: Muncie-Marion, Indiana
- Frequency: 93.5 MHz
- Branding: MAX 93.5

Programming
- Format: Classic rock

Ownership
- Owner: Woof Boom Radio Muncie License LLC
- Sister stations: WERK, WLBC-FM, WBKQ, WHBU, WMUN, WLQQ

History
- First air date: 1965
- Former call signs: WWHC (1965–1986); WWWO (1986–1999); WHTY (1999–2009)

Technical information
- Licensing authority: FCC
- Facility ID: 70187
- Class: A
- ERP: 3,000 watts
- HAAT: 139 meters (456 ft)
- Transmitter coordinates: 40°25′16.00″N 85°25′40.00″W

Links
- Public license information: Public file; LMS
- Webcast: Listen Live
- Website: MAXrocks.net

WMXQ (93.5 FM), licensed to Hartford City, Indiana, is a radio station broadcasting a classic rock format. The station serves the Muncie-Marion area and is currently owned by Woof Boom Radio Muncie License LLC. The station is known as "93-5 MAX". In the evenings, WMXQ carries the nationally syndicated radio program Nights with Alice Cooper. WMXQ is an affiliate of the Indianapolis Colts.

== History ==
In 1965, the station was originally assigned the call letters WWHC. The call letters were changed to WWWO on January 16, 1986. On June 16, 1999, the station changed its call sign to WHTY.

WMXQ (as WWWO with a rock format) began as a construction permit for a Hartford City FM station in the late 1960s but never came on the air initially due to the financial difficulties of the former WBMP in Elwood (now WIKL) which was to have founded that station, hence it remained dormant (and silent) until 1986.

On July 13, 2009, WHTY and WHTI changed call signs to WMXQ and WMQX, respectively, to go with their "MAX" branding.

On June 1, 2014, WMQX 96.7 broke away from the MAX simulcast for a country music format as "96.7 BLAKE FM". 93.5 continued on as "93.5 MAX".
