= UDP-2-acetamido-2-deoxy-ribo-hexuluronate aminotransferase =

Identifiers
- EC no.: 2.6.1.98

Databases
- IntEnz: IntEnz view
- BRENDA: BRENDA entry
- ExPASy: NiceZyme view
- KEGG: KEGG entry
- MetaCyc: metabolic pathway
- PRIAM: profile
- PDB structures: RCSB PDB PDBe PDBsum
Search
- PMC: articles
- PubMed: articles
- NCBI: proteins

UDP-2-acetamido-2-deoxy-ribo-hexuluronate aminotransferase (EC 2.6.1.98, WbpE, WlbC) is an enzyme with systematic name UDP-2-acetamido-3-amino-2,3-dideoxy-alpha-D-glucuronate:2-oxoglutarate aminotransferase. This enzyme catalyses the following chemical reaction

UDP-2-acetamido-3-amino-2,3-dideoxy-alpha-D-glucuronate + 2-oxoglutarate $\rightleftharpoons$ UDP-2-acetamido-2-deoxy-alpha-D-ribo-hex-3-uluronate + L-glutamate

This enzyme is a pyridoxal 5'-phosphate protein.
