= WIPB =

Television station in Muncie, Indiana

- Muncie, Indiana; United States
- Channels: Digital: 19 (UHF); Virtual: 49
- Branding: Ball State PBS

Programming
- Affiliations: 49.1: PBS; 49.2: Create; 49.3: Weather radar and audio simulcast of WBST

Ownership
- Owner: Ball State University
- Sister stations: WBST

History
- First air date: June 14, 1953 (as WLBC-TV); October 31, 1971 (as WIPB)
- Former call signs: WLBC-TV (1953–1971)
- Former channel numbers: Analog: 49 (UHF, 1953–2009); Digital: 23 (UHF, until 2019)
- Former affiliations: CBS (primary, 1953–early 1960s); ABC (secondary, 1953–1971); NBC (secondary 1953–early 1960s, primary early 1960s–1971); DuMont (secondary, 1953–1956); NTA Film Network (secondary, late 1950s)
- Call sign meaning: Indiana Public Broadcasting

Technical information
- Licensing authority: FCC
- Facility ID: 3646
- ERP: 228 kW
- HAAT: 246 m (807 ft)
- Transmitter coordinates: 40°5′37″N 85°23′32″W

Links
- Public license information: Public file; LMS
- Website: ballstatepbs.org

WIPB (channel 49) is a PBS member television station in Muncie, Indiana, United States. It is owned by Ball State University alongside NPR member WBST (92.1 FM). The two stations share studios at the E. F. Ball Communication Building on the university's campus on North McKinley Avenue in northwestern Muncie; WIPB's transmitter is located on County Road 50 in rural southern Delaware County (south of Cowan).

== History ==
=== UHF channel 49 in Central Indiana ===
The UHF channel 49 allocation in Central Indiana was originally occupied by WLBC-TV, which signed on the air on June 14, 1953, as a primary CBS affiliate with secondary affiliations with ABC, NBC and DuMont. The station was founded by Don Burton, owner of Muncie radio station WLBC (1340 AM, now WMUN). During the late 1950s, the station was also briefly affiliated with the NTA Film Network. WLBC-TV dropped CBS programming in the early 1960s, becoming a primary NBC and secondary ABC affiliate. Burton expanded the WLBC radio facility on 29th Street in southeast Muncie and constructed a 500-foot (152 m) tower outside the building.

Although WLBC served as the NBC and ABC affiliates of record for the Muncie area in the 1960s, the city and surrounding areas received at least Grade B signal coverage from television stations out of Indianapolis, located about 60 miles (97 km) southwest of Muncie—including NBC affiliate WFBM-TV (channel 6, now ABC affiliate WRTV), and ABC affiliate WLWI-TV (channel 13, now NBC affiliate WTHR)—as well as stations from Dayton, about 80 miles (130 km) to the east, and Fort Wayne, roughly 75 miles (121 km) to the north. To make matters worse, WLBC-TV was hampered by low viewership as only a small percentage of Central Indiana area television sets were even capable of receiving ultra high frequency (UHF) stations since set manufacturers were not required to equip televisions with UHF tuners until the Federal Communications Commission (FCC) passed the All-Channel Receiver Act in 1961; even then, UHF tuners were not included on all newer sets until 1964 and the retail prices for standalone UHF tuners at the time were high. The station eventually started a news department in the 1960s.

=== WIPB station history ===
Burton sold the UHF channel 49 license in 1971 to Eastern Indiana Community Television, a local ad hoc nonprofit group led by Gretchen Huff and Sunny Spurgeon, which had been working to apply for a license to operate an educational television station in Muncie. The group converted it into a non-commercial educational license, and changed the station's call letters to WIPB (for "Indiana Public Broadcasting"). Eastern Indiana Community Television subsequently sold the license to Ball State University, which signed on the station on the afternoon of October 31, 1971, as a PBS member station; as part of PBS' Program Differentiation Plan, the network's programming was divided between it and two other PBS members in the Indianapolis market—WFYI (channel 20) and Bloomington-based WTIU (channel 30); they were joined in 1992 by WTBU in Indianapolis (channel 69, now Daystar owned-and-operated religious station WDTI). WIPB, as a non-commercial outlet, briefly operated a news department during the 1980s, producing a daily newscast titled On-Line 49.

On November 1, 2020, WIPB rebranded as Ball State PBS.

== Programming ==
WIPB's claim to fame is having been the station that The Joy of Painting, a half-hour art program hosted by Bob Ross, originated from (except for its first season, which was recorded at WNVC in Falls Church, Virginia) from mid-1983 to 1994. The station also produces Connections Live!, a half-hour weekly magazine program that focuses on the people and places of interest in Central Indiana that connect people to their communities; the program has won four Regional Emmy Awards since 2002.

== Trivia ==
The jingle heard in WIPB's station identifications from the late 1980s was "Logo #7", a stock track composed by Vic Sepanski for the Omnimusic library. It was also utilized by WPSU-TV (then WPSX) around the same time period. As an example, this ID can be found on older recordings of The Joy of Painting.

== Technical information ==
=== Subchannels ===
The station's signal is multiplexed:

Subchannels of WIPB
Channel	Res.	Short name	Programming
49.1	720p	WIPB-DT	PBS
49.2	480i	WIPB-D2	Indiana Channel (4 p.m.–7 p.m.); Create (all other times) (4:3)
49.3	720p	WIPB-D3	Weather radar and; audio simulcast of WBST

=== Analog-to-digital conversion ===
WIPB began broadcasting a digital signal on October 31, 2005. The station shut down its analog signal, over UHF channel 49, on February 18, 2009, the day after the original target date for full-power television stations in the United States to transition from analog to digital broadcasts under federal mandate (which Congress had moved the previous month to June 12). The station's digital signal continued to broadcast on its pre-transition UHF channel 23, using virtual channel 49.

Following the transition, WIPB decommissioned its original East 29th Street tower that formerly occupied its analog transmitter, which was dismantled in January 2013; its digital signal operates from a separate 800 feet (240 m) tower located to its south.
