= WQKZ =

Coordinates: 38°10′02″N 86°49′49″W

- Ferdinand, Indiana; United States
- Broadcast area: Jasper, Indiana; Tell City, Indiana
- Frequency: 98.5 MHz
- Branding: WQKZ Hot Country 98.5 FM

Programming
- Format: Country music

Ownership
- Owner: Jasper on the Air, Inc.

Technical information
- Licensing authority: FCC
- Facility ID: 15906
- Class: A
- ERP: 3,600 watts
- HAAT: 129 meters (423 ft)

Links
- Public license information: Public file; LMS

WQKZ 98.5 FM is a radio station broadcasting a country music format. Licensed to Ferdinand, Indiana, the station serves the areas of Jasper, Indiana and Tell City, Indiana, and is owned by Jasper on the Air, Inc. The station's transmitter is located 2 miles southwest of Ferdinand along Interstate 64.
