= WHBU =

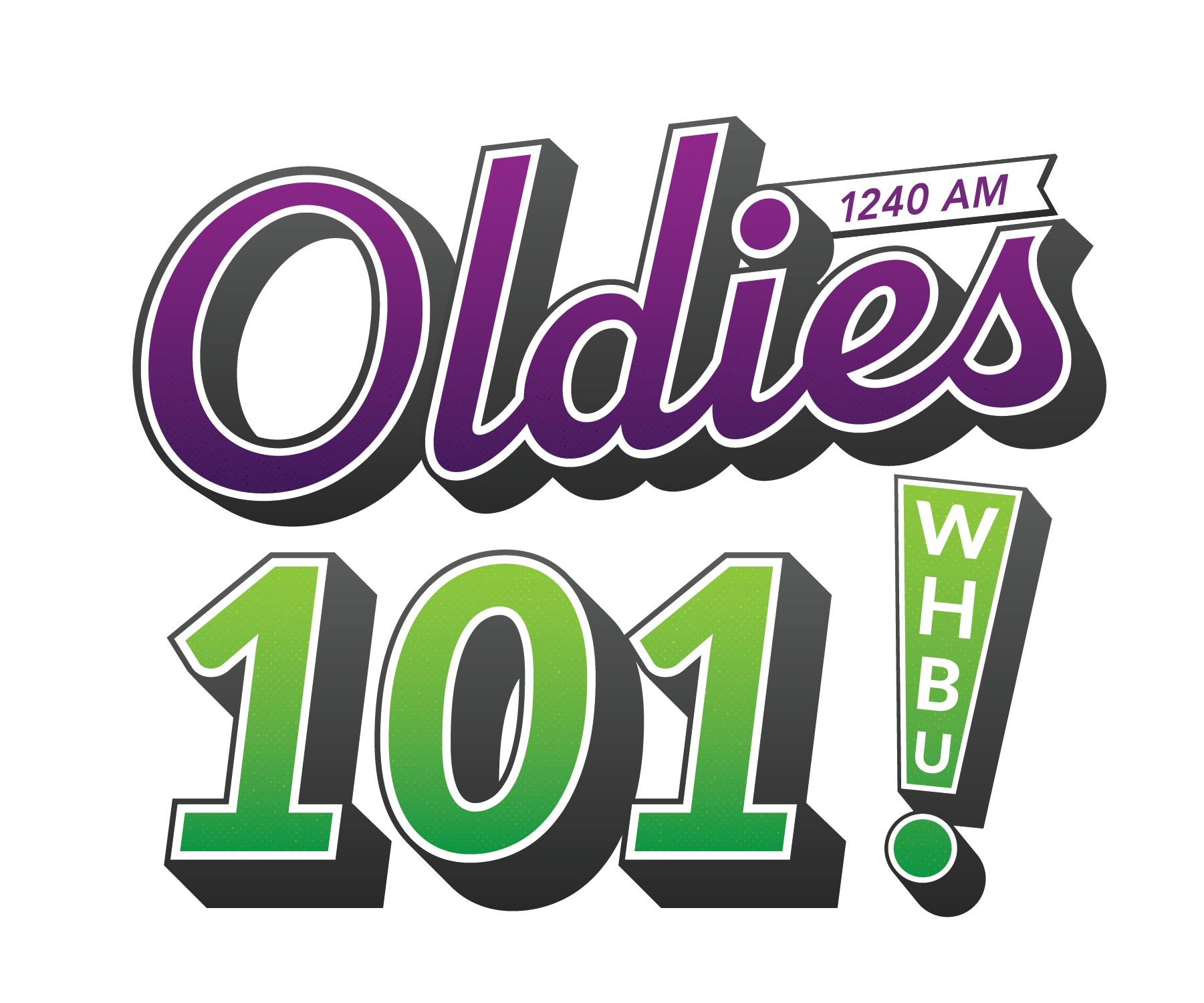
- Anderson, Indiana; United States
- Broadcast area: Muncie-Marion
- Frequency: 1240 kHz
- Branding: Oldies 101

Programming
- Format: Full-service Oldies

Ownership
- Owner: Woof Boom Radio Muncie License LLC
- Sister stations: WBKQ, WERK, WLBC-FM, WMUN, WMXQ

History
- First air date: 1925

Technical information
- Licensing authority: FCC
- Facility ID: 2212
- Class: C
- Power: 700 watts
- Transmitter coordinates: 40°4′25.00″N 85°41′58.00″W
- Translator: 101.1 W266DM (Anderson)

Links
- Public license information: Public file; LMS
- Webcast: Listen Live
- Website: www.1240whbu.com

WHBU (1240 AM) is a radio station broadcasting a full-service oldies format. Licensed to Anderson, Indiana, United States, the station serves the Muncie-Marion area. The station is currently owned by Woof Boom Radio Muncie License LLC.

WHBU is the longest running commercial radio station in Anderson.

== History ==
WHBU's first license was granted on March 20, 1925, to B. L. Bing's Sons at 1002 Meridian Street in Anderson. The call letters were randomly assigned from an alphabetic roster of available call signs. A few months later the station owner was changed to joint ownership by the Riviera Theatre and Bing's Clothing, while still located at 1002 Meridian Street. In 1927 the owner became the Citizens Bank, and in late 1931 ownership was transferred to the Anderson Broadcasting Corporation. For much of its history the station was located, along with a now-razed rooftop transmitting tower, at the Citizens Bank Building on Meridian Plaza in downtown Anderson.

On November 11, 1928, as part of a national reassignment coordinated by implementation of the Federal Radio Commission's General Order 40, WHBU was assigned to 1210 kHz. In March 1941 a further reallocation, under the provisions of the North American Regional Broadcasting Agreement, reassigned the station to its current frequency of 1240 kHz. The station affiliated with the CBS Radio Network until its sale in 1998.

It was a stand-alone AM with a full service middle of the road format before becoming clustered with Muncie area stations operated by Indiana Radio Partners. WAXT (now WBKQ) licensed to nearby Alexandria would later join the cluster. A gradual trend towards soft adult contemporary music took place beginning in the mid-1970s, which was reflected in its jingle package "Reaching Out, Touching You" produced by Pepper-Tanner Productions in Memphis. Its main competition was the former WHUT (AM) with a Top 40 (and later a country) format and the original WLHN "Stereo 98" as its FM sister with an easy listening format, which are now WGNR and WGNR-FM with a gospel format owned by Moody Broadcasting.

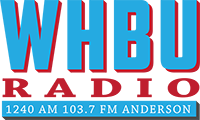
Previous logo

On May 1, 2019, WHBU switched from news/talk to a full-service format, centered on oldies while maintaining local talk shows and elements. Including local high school football and basketball, the Indianapolis 500, and the Brickyard 400.

WHBU is live and local weekday mornings with "The Anderson Journal" with Zach Johnson and George Bremer from 8-10am.
