= WLBC-FM =

Coordinates: 40.161°N 85.379°W

- Muncie, Indiana; United States
- Frequency: 104.1 MHz (HD Radio)
- Branding: 104.1 WLBC

Programming
- Format: Hot adult contemporary
- Subchannels: HD2: WBKQ simulcast (Country); HD3: The Life FM (Christian radio); HD4: WSPM simulcast (Catholic radio)
- Affiliations: Premiere Networks

Ownership
- Owner: Woof Boom Radio Muncie License LLC
- Sister stations: WBKQ, WERK, WHBU, WMUN, WMXQ

History
- First air date: October 1947
- Former call signs: WLBC-FM (1947–1948); WMUN (1948–1970)

Technical information
- Licensing authority: FCC
- Facility ID: 17602
- Class: B
- ERP: 41,000 watts
- HAAT: 140 meters (460 ft)
- Translators: HD2: 102.9 W275AJ (Muncie); HD3: 102.1 W271BY (Pendleton); HD3: 103.5 W278BY (Muncie)

Links
- Public license information: Public file; LMS
- Webcast: Listen live
- Website: wlbc.com

WLBC-FM (104.1 MHz) is a commercial FM radio station in Muncie, Indiana. It is owned by Woof Boom Radio and airs a hot adult contemporary radio format. The radio studios and transmitter are on East 29th Street in the Southside of Muncie.

WLBC-FM has an effective radiated power of 41,000 watts. It broadcasts using HD Radio technology. The HD2 digital subchannel carries a simulcast of country music sister station WBKQ 96.7 FM. The HD3 signal carries a simulcast of The Life FM, a Christian radio service. The HD4 signal carries a simulcast of 89.1 WSPM, known as "Catholic Radio Indy". Those subchannels feed three FM translators.

== History ==
In October 1947, WLBC-FM signed on the air. It was the FM counterpart to WLBC (1340 AM; now WMUN). WLBC (AM) was established in 1926 in the home of broadcasting pioneer Don Burton on South Jefferson Street in Muncie. Until the 1970s, the two stations mostly simulcast their programming. In 1953, a television station was added on Channel 49, WLBC-TV (today PBS member station WIPB).

In the 1970s WLBC-FM (previously WMUN) was one of the first Indiana FM stations with a Top 40 format competing with crosstown AM daytimer WERK (later WNAP). At first, WLBC-FM used an automated hit music package produced by Drake-Chenault Enterprises while WLBC (AM) aired traditional middle of the road programming. Over time, live disc jockeys were added to WLBC-FM.

An early employee was Chris Schenkel, who later became a top ABC-TV sports broadcaster. Schenkel came to WLBC after working at WBAA as a premedical student at Purdue University. Morry Mannies was a sportscaster on WLBC-FM and sister station WXFN. He retired several years ago after calling Ball State University sports for many years.

On June 1, 2013, WLBC-FM was acquired by Woof Boom Radio, whose Eastern Indiana cluster included WERK 104.9 FM classic hits), WHBU 1240 AM (talk radio), WXFN 1340 AM (Fox Sports Radio), WMXQ 93.5 FM (classic rock) and WBKQ 96.7 FM (country music). Woof Boom Radio purchased the stations from Backyard Broadcasting for $4.45 million.

== Staff ==
WLBC-FM is led by owner and president J Chapman and CFO Susan Rodricks. Staff also includes: Steve Lindell (with WLBC since the 1990s) who serves as Director of Operations and Morning Host, Jared Boomer, Sue Tschuor (GSM), Kim Morris (more than two decades with WLBC, hosting middays), Garry Joseph (afternoons) and Brian Casey (evenings).
