= WBST =

Indiana Public Radio station in Muncie, Indiana

- Muncie, Indiana; United States
- Frequency: 92.1 MHz
- Branding: Indiana Public Radio

Programming
- Format: Public radio
- Affiliations: National Public Radio

Ownership
- Owner: Ball State University

History
- First air date: September 12, 1960 (originally carrier current 1952–1960)
- Call sign meaning: Ball STate

Technical information
- Licensing authority: FCC
- Facility ID: 3645
- Class: A
- ERP: 3,000 watts
- HAAT: 91 meters (299 ft)
- Transmitter coordinates: 40°12′48″N 85°27′36″W
- Repeaters: WBSB, WBSH, WBSW

Links
- Public license information: Public file; LMS
- Webcast: Listen Live
- Website: indianapublicradio.org

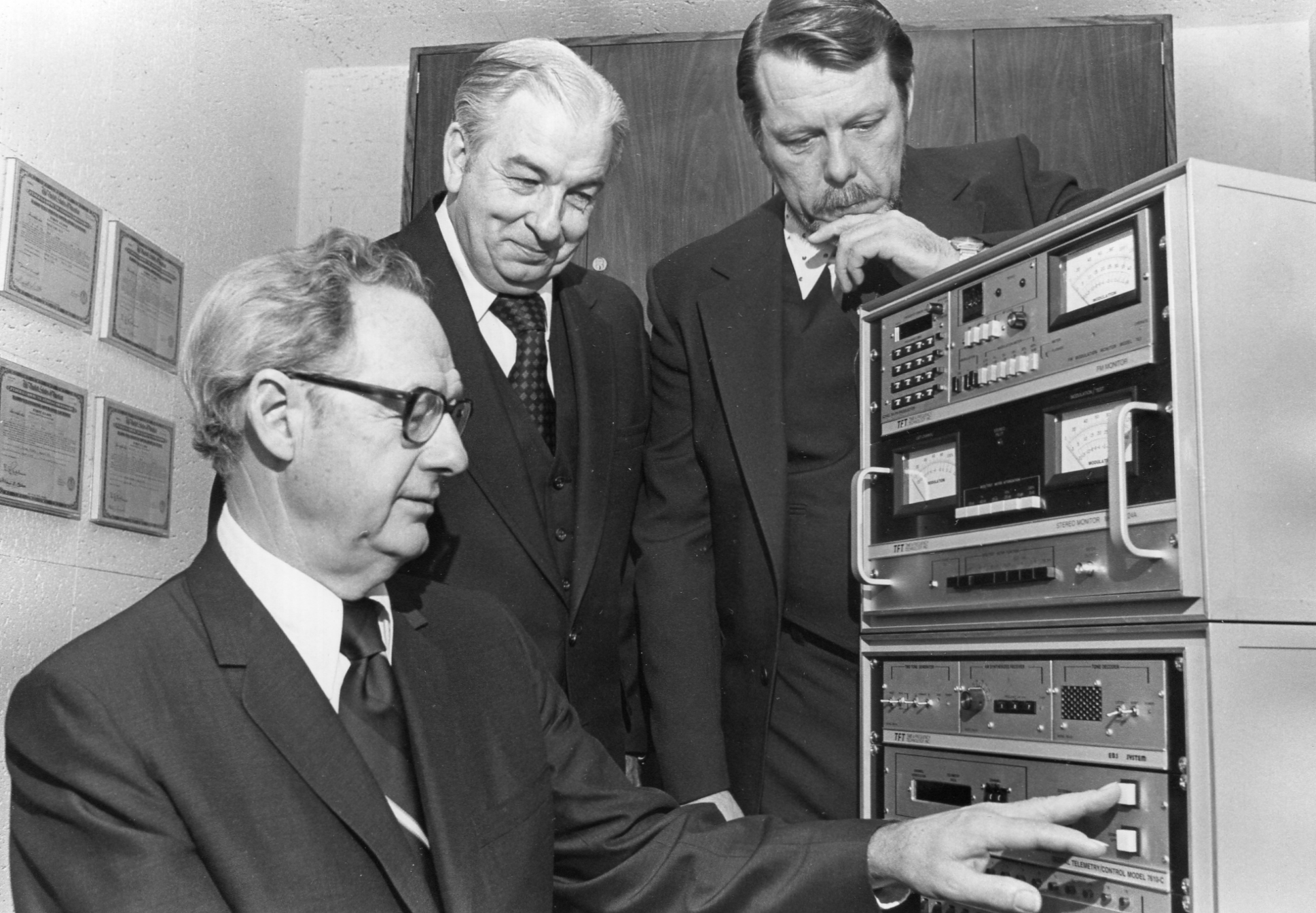
Dr. Bracken and other Ball State officials examining the new WBST transmitter.

WBST (92.1 FM) is a National Public Radio-affiliated station in Muncie, Indiana. Studios and offices are located at Ball State University. WBST serves as the flagship station for Indiana Public Radio, which can be heard on three other stations in East-Central Indiana.

Programming mainly consists of news and talk programs provided by National Public Radio as well as classical music.

David Letterman began his broadcasting career at this station. Beginning as a "disc jockey, Letterman was frequently late for work and sneaked forbidden cigarettes into the studio, thus getting on the wrong side of Tom Watson." He was later fired for treating classical music with irreverence.

== Brief history ==
In 1950, Ball State University first introduced radio to campus and city of Muncie. Beginning as a minor project of Robert Robins and situated in the basement at North Hall, WBST quickly grew and expanded. Occurring as a result of an expansive building program, WBST relocated to the Center for Radio and Television and by 1960, had acquired a 10-watt transmitter which allowed their broadcasts to reach the entire campus. Soon, however, this change would not be enough as less than 6 years later, Ball State would demand and receive the rights to build a new radio tower which increased their wattage from 10 to 3,000 which allowed the station to enjoy a larger range which it now still utilizes as of 2018.

=== Radio tower controversy ===
As Ball State was expanding in the post World War II years, it became apparent that they needed to improve their radio programming. All across the United States, colleges and universities began creating or improving upon their radio and television broadcasting capabilities, and Ball State was quick to adapt. This eventually led officials to allocate around $75,000 to help fund the construction for a new site, tower, and transmitter. However, after the tower's new site along Nebo Road in North Muncie was established, citizens began to express concerns pertaining to decreased property values as a result of the tower, poor television reception caused by interference, and zoning problems. After much debate and threats of injunctions against the university, this tower was finally completed in the summer of 1978 and WBST could now reach much of East-Central Indiana.

=== Broader context ===
After the end of World War II, American colleges and universities became engorged with a "veteran bulge" as thousands of former military personnel took advantage of the G.I. Bill, and pursued higher education. This then promoted a growth in various educational programs such as radio and later television. This surge in interest then permitted the use of such programs for educational purposes such as listening to school broadcasts, educational records, government speeches, radio courses, school sponsored programs.

A growing concern pertaining to the direction university-run radio would lead, seemed to emerge while this growth was occurring. This issue related to the topic of whether or not University radio would be devoted to commercialization or public radio. Many universities, attempting to blend the two concepts, consequently struggled as "they could not overcome the fundamental contradiction." However, this was a concept that Ball State, as well as many other universities attempted, as in 1951, WBST introduced commercials to their programming.

=== Conclusion ===
Overall then, after World War II, collegiate radio programs grew all over the country and Ball State University was no exception. Having humble beginnings with a 10 watt transmitter and no real place to operate, WBST grew to 3,000 watts, employed a devoted staff, a scholarly program, of which David Letterman was a part, and an expensive tower that increased the range of the station. WBST, similar to the programs across the country, grew during this time and became an important addition to Ball State University.

== Indiana Public Radio ==
In 1997, programming from WBST expanded to 4 newly licensed full power stations, also owned by Ball State University, to bring the rest of East-central Indiana an outlet for Public Radio. One of these stations, WBSJ in Portland, Indiana, went off the air on January 4, 2019, due to the failure of its transmitter, and the university decided against replacing the transmitter due to the cost.

Call sign	Frequency	City of license	FID	ERP (W)	HAAT	Class	FCC info
WBSB	89.5 FM	Anderson, Indiana	3650	400	111 m (364 ft)	A	LMS
WBSH	91.1 FM	Hagerstown, Indiana	3648	8,000 vertical 300 horizontal	66 m (217 ft)	B1	LMS
WBSW	90.9 FM	Marion, Indiana	3649	2,400 vertical 1,000 horizontal	94 m (308 ft)	A	LMS
