= WMUN =

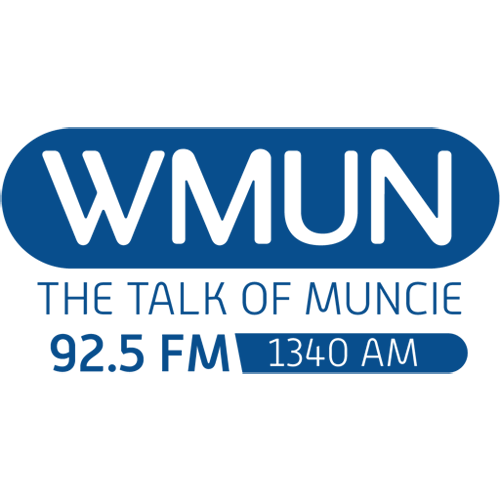

Muncie, Indiana; United States
- Broadcast area: Delaware County, Indiana
- Frequency: 1340 kHz
- Branding: WMUN 92.5 FM and 1340 AM

Programming
- Format: Talk; sports
- Affiliations: Fox News Radio; Fox Sports Radio; Indianapolis Colts Radio Network; Indiana Pacers Radio Network

Ownership
- Owner: Woof Boom Radio Muncie License LLC
- Sister stations: WBKQ, WERK, WHBU, WLBC-FM, WMXQ

History
- First air date: November 1926; 99 years ago (as WLBC)
- Former call signs: WLBC (1926–1996); WXFN (1996–2022)
- Call sign meaning: Muncie

Technical information
- Licensing authority: FCC
- Facility ID: 17601
- Class: C
- Power: 1,000 watts
- Transmitter coordinates: 40°9′42.00″N 85°22′41.00″W
- Translator: 92.5 W223CZ (Muncie)

Links
- Public license information: Public file; LMS
- Webcast: Listen live
- Website: www.wmunmuncie.com

WMUN (1340 AM) is a commercial radio station licensed to Muncie, Indiana, and serving Delaware County, Indiana. It broadcasts a talk and sports radio format and is owned by Woof Boom Radio Muncie License LLC. WMUN features programming from Fox Sports Radio. The station airs some local talk programming in the morning, and a local hour of sports talk is heard weekdays at 4 p.m. WMUN is the flagship station for Ball State University women's basketball and carries games from the Indianapolis Colts and Indiana Pacers. On Friday nights in the fall, WMUN carries local high school football.

WMUN is powered at 1,000 watts non-directional. Programming is also heard on 170 watt FM translator W223CZ at 92.5 MHz.

== History ==
In November 1926, the station first signed on the air. The original call sign was WLBC. It was originally powered at 250 watts and was owned by The Tri-City Radio Corporation. WLBC was a CBS Radio Network affiliate, carrying its dramas, comedies, sports and news during the "Golden Age of Radio". In the 1950s, when network programming moved from radio to television, WLBC switched to a full service, middle of the road (MOR) format of popular adult music, news and sports.

WLBC's call sign was changed to WXFN on October 2, 1996, in conjunction with the move from a country music format to sports radio. The WLBC call letters are still used by co-owned WLBC-FM at 104.1 FM. The WLBC call sign was also used on UHF channel 49 as a commercial TV station until 1971, when WLBC-TV became public television station WIPB.

As a sports station, WXFN initially relied on programming from One on One Sports. In 2011, the station ended a 10-year affiliation with ESPN Radio and joined Fox Sports Radio; the move was in part prompted by concerns that obligations to carry ESPN Radio's national play-by-play broadcasts would interfere with WXFN's ability to air local sports.

The call sign was changed to WMUN on May 16, 2022. Following the change, the station began airing promos announcing that it was "building a new radio station for Muncie and Delaware County". In late 2022, WMUN began adding local talk programming to its lineup and marketing as "The Talk of Muncie", while retaining some sports programming.
