= WBKQ =

Coordinates: 40°10′38″N 85°40′23″W

- Alexandria, Indiana; United States
- Broadcast area: Muncie, Indiana
- Frequency: 96.7 MHz
- Branding: 96.7 Blake FM

Programming
- Format: Country

Ownership
- Owner: Woof Boom Radio Muncie License, LLC
- Sister stations: WERK, WLBC-FM, WMUN, WMXQ, WHBU, WLQQ

History
- First air date: 1980 (as WAXT)
- Former call signs: WAXT (1980–1999); WHTI (1999–2009); WMQX (2009–2014)

Technical information
- Licensing authority: FCC
- Facility ID: 68150
- Class: A
- ERP: 2,500 watts
- HAAT: 107 meters
- Repeater: 104.1 WLBC-HD2 (Muncie)

Links
- Public license information: Public file; LMS
- Website: 967blakefm.com

WBKQ (96.7 FM, "Blake FM") is a radio station licensed to Alexandria, Indiana. It serves the Muncie area and is owned by Woof Boom Radio Muncie License, LLC and airs a new country music format.

Logo before 102.9 translator sign on
