= Mass media in Indianapolis =

Mass media in Indianapolis includes various print media, television, and radio outlets in Indianapolis, Indiana, United States. As of 2009, Indianapolis is ranked as the 25th largest media market, with over 1.1 million homes.

Radio and television broadcasts are regulated by the Federal Communications Commission (FCC).

== Print media ==
The Indianapolis Star has the most subscriptions for a daily newspaper in the city. It is owned by USA Today Co., which also publishes a weekly newspaper called The Topics that focuses on local and community-related news for northern Indianapolis and the surrounding suburbs.

Nuvo Newsweekly and Indianapolis Monthly are local publications concentrating on arts, entertainment, nightlife, and lifestyles.

The Indianapolis Recorder is a weekly publication that serves the African-American community. La Voz De Indiana is a bilingual newspaper focused on Latin-American issues. Tribuna News is a Bilingual (English-Spanish) newspaper for Hispanics in Indianapolis, focused on local news.

The Indianapolis Business Journal and Inside Indiana Business are business news publications for the greater Indianapolis region.

A community newspaper, The Broad Ripple Gazette, serves the Broad Ripple area of the city.

== Radio ==
The following radio stations serve all or portions of the Indianapolis metropolitan area:

=== AM stations ===
- 810 WSYW Indianapolis (Spanish AC)
- 950 WXLW Indianapolis (Conservative talk)
- 1070 WFNI Indianapolis (Sports/ESPN)
- 1260 WNDE Indianapolis (Sports)
- 1310 WTLC Indianapolis (Black gospel)
- 1430 WXNT Indianapolis (Sports)
- 1500 WBRI Indianapolis (Christian)
- 1590 WNTS Beech Grove (Regional Mexican)

=== FM stations ===
- 88.7 WICR Indianapolis (College/classical/jazz/University of Indianapolis)
- 89.3 WJEL Indianapolis (High school/Metropolitan School District of Washington Township)
- 90.1 WFYI-FM Indianapolis (NPR/News/talk)
- 90.5 WQRA Greencastle (Air1)
- 90.9 WBDG Indianapolis (High school/variety/Metropolitan School District of Wayne Township)
- 90.9 WSQM Noblesville (Relevant Radio)
- 91.1 WEDM Indianapolis (High school/variety/Metropolitan School District of Warren Township)
- 91.5 WRFT Indianapolis (High school/variety/Franklin Township Community School Corporation)
- 92.3 WTTS Trafalgar (Adult album alternative)
- 93.1 WIBC Indianapolis (News/talk)
- 93.9 WNDX Lawrence (Active rock)
- 94.7 WFBQ Indianapolis (Classic rock)
- 95.5 WFMS Fishers (Country)
- 95.9 WFDM-FM Franklin (Conservative talk)
- 96.3 WYHX Indianapolis (BBN)
- 97.1 WLHK Shelbyville (Country)
- 97.9 WGNR-FM Anderson (Moody Radio)
- 98.3 WZRL Plainfield (Urban contemporary)
- 99.5 WZPL Greenfield (CHR)
- 100.9 WHHH Speedway (Hip-hop)
- 101.9 WKLU Brownsburg (K-Love)
- 103.3 WOLT Indianapolis (Classic alternative)
- 104.5 WJJK Noblesville (Classic hits)
- 105.7 WYXB Indianapolis (Adult contemporary)
- 106.7 WTLC-FM Greenwood (Urban AC)
- 107.1 WEDJ Danville (Regional Mexican)
- 107.9 WNTR Indianapolis (Adult contemporary)

=== Low-power FM stations and translators ===
- 92.7 W224DI Indianapolis (Black gospel/WTLC simulcast)
- 93.5 W228CX Indianapolis (Sports/ESPN/WFNI simulcast)
- 95.1 W236CR Indianapolis (Black gospel/WTLC simulcast)
- 96.7 W244DN Indianapolis (Christian/WBRI simulcast)
- 97.5 W248BW Indianapolis (Business news/WOLT-HD2 simulcast)
- 99.1 WQRT-LP Indianapolis (Community)
- 100.1 WSHT-LP Indianapolis (Oldies)
- 102.9 W275BD Greenfield (Classic hip-hop/WHHH-HD2 simulcast)
- 105.1 W286CM Indianapolis (Regional Mexican/WHHH-HD3 simulcast)
- 106.3 WEPB-LP Noblesville (Community)
- 107.5 W298BB Indianapolis (Sports/ESPN/WFNI simulcast)

The Bob & Tom Show, syndicated across much of the United States, airs from Indianapolis.

== Television ==
Indianapolis is served by the following local broadcast television stations:

=== Full-power ===
- 4 WTTV Bloomington (CBS, Independent on 4.2)
- 6 WRTV Indianapolis (ABC)
- 8 WISH-TV Indianapolis (The CW)
- 13 WTHR Indianapolis (NBC)
- 20 WFYI Indianapolis (PBS)
- 23 WNDY-TV Marion (Independent with MyNetworkTV)
- 29 WTTK Kokomo (CBS, Independent on 29.2)
- 40 WHMB-TV Indianapolis (Univision)
- 42 WCLJ-TV Bloomington (Bounce TV)
- 59 WXIN Indianapolis (Fox)
- 63 WIPX-TV Bloomington (Ion Television)
- 69 WDTI Indianapolis (Daystar)

=== Low-power ===
- 15 WREP-LD Martinsville (YTA TV)
- 17 WIIH-CD Indianapolis
- 19 WDNI-CD Indianapolis (Telemundo, TeleXitos on 19.2)
- 28 WUDZ-LD Indianapolis
- 32 WSDI-LD Indianapolis
- 46 WALV-CD Indianapolis (MeTV)
- 47 WBXI-CD Indianapolis (Start TV)
- 51 WJSJ-CD Indianapolis (WEST)

The Pat McAfee Show, a popular sports talk show hosted by former NFL punter Pat McAfee, is produced in Indianapolis and airs on ESPN, ESPN+, Disney+, and YouTube.
