= Jeff Smulyan =

American broadcast and sports executive (born 1947)

- Born: Jeffrey Howard Smulyan; April 6, 1947 (age 79); Indianapolis, Indiana, U.S.
- Education: B.A and J.D. University of Southern California
- Known for: founder and CEO of Emmis Corporation owner of the Seattle Mariners
- Spouse: Heather Smulyan
- Children: 3

Jeffrey Howard Smulyan (born April 6, 1947) is the founder and chief executive officer of Emmis Corporation. He owned the Seattle Mariners of Major League Baseball from 1989 to 1992.

== Early life and education ==
Smulyan is the son of Natalie and Sam Smulyan. He has one brother and one sister. His father owned the local Howard Johnson's motel franchise and was president of Congregation Beth-El Zedeck. A cum laude graduate of the University of Southern California with a B.A. in History and Telecommunications, Smulyan earned a Juris Doctor degree from USC School of Law, where he served as note and comment editor of the Southern California Law Review

== Career ==
In 1973, Smulyan returned to Indianapolis, where his father purchased WNTS-AM for $400,000 and named Jeff vice president and general manager. WNTS was a talk station, which employed David Letterman, and the format was changed to all-news when NBC launched the all-news NBC News and Information Service in 1975. When NBC abandoned the format after only two years, WNTS switched to religious broadcasting. Two years later, they purchased KCRO in Omaha, which was also religious. In 1980, he founded Emmis Broadcasting Corporation as the principal shareholder and began to purchase radio stations: WENS in Indianapolis, WLOL in Minneapolis, KSHE in St. Louis, KPWR in Los Angeles, WQHT (1986) and WHN (1986) in New York, and WAVA (1986) in Washington D.C. making Emmis the largest privately owned radio broadcasting company in America. In 1987, WHN was switched to WFAN, the first all sports radio station in America. In 1988, he purchased KXXX in San Francisco; WKQX in Chicago; WJIB in Boston; and WYNY and WNBC in New York. He also purchased the Indianapolis Monthly magazine. In 1991, he sold WFAN for $70 million, the highest price ever paid for a radio station at the time.

Emmis grew to build brands like Hot 97 in New York City, Power 106 in Los Angeles, KSHE in St. Louis, Q101 in Chicago, WVUE-TV in New Orleans, and Texas Monthly and Los Angeles magazines. At one time, Emmis owned 15 television stations, six monthly city/regional magazines, and more than 20 radio stations.

In 2022, Smulyan released the book "Never Ride a Roller Coaster Upside Down", which details Smulyan's life and career, to rave reviews from people like Andrew Luck and David Letterman.

As of 2025, Emmis (the Hebrew word for truth) owns 1 FM and 2 AM radio stations in Indianapolis and New York City. In March 2020, Emmis acquired the sound masking business of Lencore Acoustics Corp., which makes high-quality sound masking solutions for offices and other commercial applications. Emmis owns Digonex, which provides dynamic pricing solutions across multiple industries. Emmis has an investment in Anzu, an advertising technology company focused on video games. In January 2025, Emmis launched a groundbreaking new bilingual AC radio station in New York City, La Exitosa on WEPN-FM and WLIB.

Emmis developed and licensed TagStation; NextRadio, a smartphone application that paired FM radio broadcasts with visual and interactive features on smartphones, and created DialReport, a data attribution platform for the radio industry.

== Seattle Mariners ==
In 1989, Smulyan with partners (including Letterman), purchased the Seattle Mariners from George Argyros for $75 million. Smulyan held the largest interest and contributed $35 million while the remainder was contributed by Morgan Stanley ($20 million); other investors ($5 million); and the remainder via bank financing. In three years as owner, the Mariners, mired in perpetual mediocrity, continued that run despite attempts to promote the team. Smulyan later stated that it came down due to how they underestimated the state of the team and the perception of the city towards the team that he felt was "cynical." Once, at a gathering of accountants in nearby Tacoma, Smulyan talked to a fan of the Seattle Seahawks who said he was surprised that the Mariners also played at the Kingdome. The team made a plan to increase payroll from $7 million to $20 million within three years and not be the lowest payroll in the American League. Three years later, the payroll was $24 million but they were still in the bottom half of the league payroll.

Smulyan, who became somewhat of a pariah in the town, put the team up for sale in 1991, hoping to break an escape clause that could mean he would sell for a high price over $100 million; the league privately pushed for a move to Tampa. Through the efforts of a local attorney, Art Harrigan, who successfully argued that the escape clause did not apply in relation to timing that kept the price at $100 million, and Senator Slade Gorton, a group of local buyers, headlined by Nintendo of America, bought the team. Smulyan said he did not meet with the prospective buyers before the sale was approved by other baseball owners.

In 2005, Smulyan was one of the final eight bidders vying to buy the Washington Nationals, but Ted Lerner ended up winning the bid.

== Honors and accolades ==
In 1994, Smulyan was named by the White House to head the U.S. Delegation to the Plenipotentiary Conference of the International Telecommunication Union. As a U.S. ambassador, he helped negotiate a landmark agreement between Israel and the Palestine Liberation Organization.

Smulyan is a former director of the National Association of Broadcasters, former chair of the Radio Advertising Bureau, past chair of the Central Indiana Corporate Partnership, and a member of other civic boards and committees. He serves on the board of trustees of his alma mater, University of Southern California.

Smulyan has been recognized as a Giant of Broadcasting by the Library of American Broadcasting, received the National Association of Broadcasters National Radio Award, and was inducted in the Broadcasting & Cable Hall of Fame and the Indiana Business Hall of Fame. The Broadcasters Foundation honored him with its Golden Mike Award and in 2017 he received the Lowry Mays Excellence in Broadcasting Award from the Broadcasters Foundation of America. He has received the Indianapolis Business Journal's Mike Carroll Award for civic leadership, and he was named an Indiana Living Legend by the Indiana Historical Society.

== Personal life ==
In 1981, Smulyan and then-wife Janine appeared as contestants on the game show Las Vegas Gambit. In 2003, he married Heather Hill. Smulyan has three children and two grandchildren.
