= WIBC =

WIBC may refer to:

- WIBC (FM), a radio station (93.1 FM) licensed to Indianapolis, Indiana, United States
- WFNI, a radio station (1070 AM) licensed to Indianapolis, Indiana, which held the call sign WIBC from 1938 to 2007
- Women's International Bowling Congress
- Women's Interstate Basketball Conference, the inaugural season of what would become the Australian Women's National Basketball League
- Wrought Iron Bridge Company
