= WLHK =

Radio station in Shelbyville–Indianapolis, Indiana

- Shelbyville, Indiana; United States
- Broadcast area: Indianapolis metropolitan area
- Frequency: 97.1 MHz (HD Radio)
- Branding: 97.1 Hank FM

Programming
- Format: Country
- Subchannels: HD2: Spanish tropical "Fuego 92.7"
- Affiliations: Indianapolis Colts

Ownership
- Owner: Urban One; (Radio One of Indiana, LLC)
- Sister stations: WHHH; WIBC; WTLC; WTLC-FM; WYXB; WDNI-CD

History
- First air date: November 6, 1964 (as WSVL-FM)
- Former call signs: WSVL-FM (1964–1981); WENS (1981–2005)
- Call sign meaning: "Hank" (station's nickname)

Technical information
- Licensing authority: FCC
- Facility ID: 19522
- Class: B
- ERP: 23,000 watts
- HAAT: 223 meters (732 ft)
- Transmitter coordinates: 39°40′6.2″N 86°1′43.9″W
- Translator: HD2: 92.7 W224DI (Indianapolis)

Links
- Public license information: Public file; LMS
- Webcast: Listen live; HD2: Listen live
- Website: hankfm.com; HD2: fuegoindy.com

WLHK (97.1 FM), 97-1 Hank FM, is a country music radio station owned by Urban One. While the station is licensed to Shelbyville, Indiana, its studios are located on Monument Circle in downtown Indianapolis. The transmitter, according to the Federal Communications Commission (FCC), is located in the 7000 block of East Southport Road on the southeast side of Indianapolis.

WLHK is the FM outlet for the Indianapolis Colts, as of the 2007 season. (Its sister station, 1070 WFNI is the flagship station for the football team.) WLHK also carries Indiana University men's basketball, in the event of programming conflict on WFNI.

WLHK is licensed by the FCC to broadcast in the HD Radio format.

== History ==
=== Early years (1964–1980) ===
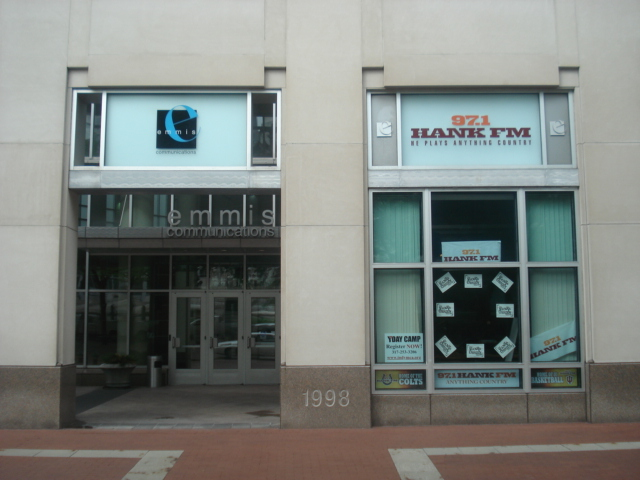
Hank FM Studio

The station first signed on as WSVL-FM on November 6, 1964, as the FM partner to WSVL 1520 (now WSVX). WSVL-FM was programmed to serve Shelbyville and the surrounding communities.

=== Adult contemporary (1980–1994) ===
In 1980, Indianapolis lawyer and broadcaster Jeff Smulyan and two partners formed Emmis Communications. The name Emmis is taken from the Hebrew language, meaning "truth". They purchased WSVL-FM with the goal to move the radio station into the larger nearby Indianapolis radio market. WSVL-FM relaunched as adult contemporary music formatted WENS on July 4, 1981, at 6AM. WENS was known as the "Flagship Station of Emmis Broadcasting" according to its hourly legal station identification. The radio station's new programming was an immediate success in the Indianapolis market.

With help from Chief Engineer Bob Hawkins, the late Tim McKee was the first voice heard on the new FM 97 WENS. The original air staff included McKee and Program Director Rick Cummings in middays, Gary Semro in morning drive, Scott Wheeler in afternoon drive, with Chuck Larson and Kristi Lee in nights and overnights. Veteran broadcast journalist Glenn Webber anchored morning news on WENS. Afternoon news anchor was Carol Harm. Harm was soon replaced by Linda Shane. Bernie Eagan joined the radio station in August 1981. Other early weekend talent included Jerry Walker, Kevin Dugan, Wendi Ney and Jennifer Carr. Chuck Larson left the station for WNAP in October 1981 and was replaced by Gene Olson. Cummings moved to mornings after Semro joined the Satellite Music Network in Chicago for morning drive on SMN's new Country Coast to Coast format in the fall of 1981.

While the early WENS promoted itself as the radio station for "no gimmicks, games, or contests", a Labor Day tradition in Indianapolis was started in 1983, when WENS presented its first "Skyconcert." The fireworks show, created by then Promotions Director Martha Sakai, was an elaborately synchronized fireworks-to-music show presented on the banks of the White River at Tenth Street in downtown Indianapolis. "Skyconcert" drew crowds estimated at 400,000 and continued to run every year until 2008. The fireworks were provided by the local Casse family. The show was produced and choreographed by Rick Cummings through 1995, then by Jennifer Casse-Holt and Emmis Production Director Scott Robinson (aka, McElroy) until 2008. "Skyconcert" was also broadcast by tape delay on Indianapolis television at first, then live on WTHR, then WISH-TV, garnering strong viewership. "Skyconcert" was a sales success for the WENS sales department, first headed by Jim Culbertson, and later by sales leadership from Gary Rozynek, Jon Horton, Mark Renier, and Tom O'Brien. "Skyconcert" had the distinction of being one of the largest and longest running events in Indianapolis to never be rained out.

Once Program Director Rick Cummings became more involved with the growth of Emmis Broadcasting, Ron Jordan was hired for morning drive. Jordan only lasted three months in the shift. He was replaced by the all too brief pairing of Bruce Munson and Tim McKee. McKee died of a heart attack just three days before the second annual WENS "Skyconcert" in late August 1984. McKee's midday shift was filled by the return of Chuck Larson, who had returned for weekends, after working part-time with daytimer beautiful music-formatted WATI. It was Larson who first took the call informing station management of McKee's death. Later, McKee's grieving fiancée confirmed that it was Larson's compassionate response to her call that allowed her to keep her emotions in check during that first difficult hour after Tim's passing. McKee had also served as production director for WENS, and was replaced in that capacity by Tom Woody.

Scott Wheeler became program director following Cummings move to Emmis corporate programmer. Under Wheeler's leadership, WENS became one of the radio station's that redefined the new AC sound. Still, Wheeler faced a difficult battle with up and coming Top 40 WZPL. Ratings at WENS dropped, and Wheeler was replaced as program director by Joel Grey. Wheeler remained and split the midday shift with Grey. Grey's first move as PD was to shift Chuck Larson, by then starring in weekends for Randy Michaels at WLW in Cincinnati, to late nights. Larson left the station again, in a move to Evansville, Indiana, as chief engineer of radio station WGBF. Under Grey, WENS adopted the name of "Lite Rock 97" and quickly regained its earlier ratings dominance.

Chuck Larson was replaced in the late night slot by Dave Taylor. With Taylor came the birth of "Night Lite Love Songs", a nighttime request and dedication show. Taylor left to return to Boston late in 1986, and was replaced on the "Night Lite" show by Eric Garnes. Garnes had joined for weekends in early 1982, and had been hosting overnights on WENS since the 1985 departure of Gene Olson. Garnes was replaced in overnights by Darla Coop. Production director Tom Woody had been replaced by Eric Edwards in late 1985. With Edwards' 1986 move to sister station KPWR in Los Angeles, Coop with help from Neal Kelly had taken a greater production role at the station. With the move to overnights, Coop was replaced in production by Tammy Warner.

After the death of Tim McKee, Munson was joined in mornings by Mark Patrick. Known as "Them Guys in the Morning", the show failed to gain traction against WFBQ's Bob and Tom show, and Munson left the station for a career in law and politics in the fall of 1986. Dennis Jon Bailey crossed the street from WIRE to join Patrick in morning drive. This show also failed to draw an audience, and Patrick left the show in spring 1987. Frustrated with having to host a music intensive morning show, Bailey left for WKLR-FM in August 1987. Tammy Warner also moved to WKLR that fall. Scott Wheeler left WENS to join friend Gary Hoffmann at WZPL in July 1987.

Jerry Curtis had joined WENS for middays weeks prior to Bailey's departure. Curtis quickly moved into the morning show, and was later joined by John Cinnamon. Alan Cook joined WENS in September 1987. Cook first worked early evenings, then middays, and contributed greatly to the growth of station's award-winning production effort. By 1988, Coop had joined Garnes on "Night Lite Love Songs", and was replaced in overnights by former station intern and "Night Lite" producer Stephanie Smith. Once Coop finally left the station, Smith moved to co-hosting duties on "Night Lite", and was replaced in overnights by Don Carson.

As the 1980s ended, WENS on-air staffers included "John and Jerry in the Morning", Operations Director Joel Grey and Music Director Alan Cook in middays, APD Bernie Eagan in afternoons, Eric Garnes and Stephanie Smith on "Night Lite" and Don Carson in overnights. Audrey Rochelle was WENS news director. Ken Hayes anchored drive time traffic from "Beck Toyota Mobile 97". Weekend talent included Mike Adams, Tim Bonnell, Neal Kelly, Gary Hunter, Mike Seneda and Scott Robinson. Other 1980s weekend talent at WENS included Kevin Calabro, Mike Ivers, Ellen K, now morning drive at KOST in Los Angeles and Darryl Parks, formerly of WLW in Cincinnati. David Christian joined WENS in 1989 as Production Director and also carried a weekend air shift.

Unlike the 1980s, the 1990s were a relatively quiet time regarding air staff change at WENS. The summer of 1990 brought the end of the "John and Jerry" morning show. Scott Fischer joined news director Audrey Rochelle on the WENS morning show in the fall of 1990. In the spring of 1991 Program Director Joel Grey left WENS. That summer Alan Cook and Stephanie Smith also left the radio station. John Cinnamon, formerly of the "John and Jerry" morning show, was rehired for middays. Eric Garnes continued as solo host on "Night Lite Love Songs".

Joel Grey's replacement was Chuck Knight, from the Des Moines, Iowa, radio market. Knight inherited a veteran and highly successful air staff. Don Carson expanded his overnight duties with the role of morning show producer. Previous WENS morning show producers had included Howard Schrott, Kevin Burris and Kay Feeney. Former weekender Tim Bonnell took the 10p to 2a shift. This included the last two hours of "Nite Lite Love Songs". Bonnell had returned in November 1988, as a part-timer, from a one-year stint in Raleigh, North Carolina, at WTRG, as morning show producer for former WENS morning co-host Mark Patrick. The one major change made by Knight was the fall 1992 replacement of news director Audrey Rochelle with Ann Craig. The remainder of Knight's three-year tenure at WENS was marked without further change in the weekday air schedule. In early 1992, David Christian left as WENS production director. Christian's role at the station was filled by Scott Robinson. Chuck Knight left for the Philadelphia market in the summer of 1994. He was replaced at WENS by respected Los Angeles broadcast programmer Greg Dunkin.

=== Hot adult contemporary (1994–2003) ===
In the fall of 1994, Dunkin renamed Lite Rock 97 as 97-1 WENS, the "Best Mix of the 70s, 80s, and the 90s". Dunkin also eliminated Eric Garnes' long time "Night Lite Love Songs" program, extended the night shifts to 7 pm to midnight and midnight to 5:30 am. The popular Garnes remained as WENS night personality. Bonnell was moved to overnights. The only full-time lineup change for much of the remainder of the 1990s was the brief swap of Bernie Eagan and Scott Fischer. Eagan quickly found that he disliked early morning hours, and both Eagan and Fischer soon returned to their previous places on the WENS schedule. Ken Hayes had left as traffic anchor in the mid-1990s and was replaced by Paul Poteet in mornings and Rich McDonald in afternoons. McDonald also became the cornerstone of the WENS weekend lineup during that time.

By the end of the 1990s, Scott Fischer had left the radio station. His role on the WENS morning show was filled by midday talent John Cinnamon, joining his wife Ann Craig. Cinnamon and Craig had married several years earlier. Cinnamon's midday shift was taken by weekend talent Michelle Rivers. Rivers has begun her broadcast career working in call-out research at WENS in the late 1980s.

Changing times and changing tastes marked the change in century at WENS. In 2001, the "Ann and John" morning show was replaced by Bernie Eagan, paired with Stephanie Quinn. Quinn had worked at the station as Stephanie Smith in the late 1980s. Bernie's time in WENS morning drive would again be brief. It was announced that WENS had hired Julie Patterson and Steve King from crosstown WZPL. "Julie and Steve" sat out an extended non-compete and then replaced Eagan and Quinn in mornings. WENS marked the time with a "Free Julie and Steve" promotion.

After Y2K, the station's positioning statement became "the Best Mix of the 80s, 90s, and Today". In 1999, Bernie Eagan had begun hosting the "Friday Night Retro Show", an early effort at 1980s intensive music programming. The show was a ratings success, forcing the creation of all 1980s weekends. In 2002, WENS dropped all 1980s music from its playlist; the void in 1980s music programming allowed the creation of competing Retro 93-9 FM. At the same time, WENS dropped all mention of the heritage WENS call letters from station programming. Playing only music of the 1990s with currents and re-currents from the 2000s, and using the name "Mix 97-1", WENS took a drop in both ratings and advertising revenue. By the time station management reversed the "Mix 97-1" decision, WENS was in a seemingly irreversible decline.

=== Talk/Modern AC hybrid (2003–2005) ===
In the fall of 2003, WENS fired its entire airstaff. Long time station veterans like Bernie Eagan and Eric Garnes had joined Scott Fischer and Scott Wheeler at sister soft AC WYXB B-105.7 FM. Twenty-year station General Manager Christine Woodward-Duncan was replaced by Tom Severino. Program Director Greg Dunkin left to form his own consultancy. Then current WENS air-staffers like Julie Patterson and Steve King, Michelle Rivers and Chris Ott were replaced with the hybrid personality talk/modern AC music formatted "real 97.1 - real life. real music". Real 97.1 featured Ernie and Angela in the morning, along with Ann Duran in middays, Monique and the Man in afternoons, and the syndicated Alan Kabel show at nights. The real 97.1 format struggled to find audience during its eighteen-month existence. Near the end of Real 97–1, Emmis added sister CHR WNOU Radio Now 93.1 morning show "Wank and O'Brien", moving Ernie Mills to nights.

=== Country (2005–present) ===
In March 2005, WENS changed format and call letters to a country music format, in an attempt to compete with rival WFMS. The new format, dubbed "Hank FM", accompanied the station's new call letters, WLHK, and its new slogan "[We/He] Plays Anything Country". The "Wank and O'Brien" morning show and Ernie Mills in afternoons were the only elements of the old WENS to remain after the change. In August 2022, Hank FM added the new morning show "Annie+Cole".

Previous logo

On June 13, 2022, Emmis announced the sale of its Indianapolis stations to Urban One. The sale, at a price of $25 million, was consummated on August 31, 2022.
