= WHHH =

Radio station in Speedway–Indianapolis, Indiana

- Speedway, Indiana; United States
- Broadcast area: Indianapolis metropolitan area
- Frequency: 100.9 MHz (HD Radio)
- Branding: Hot 100.9

Programming
- Format: Mainstream urban
- Subchannels: HD2: Regional Mexican "La Grande 105.1"

Ownership
- Owner: Urban One; (Radio One of Indiana, LLC)
- Sister stations: WFNI, WIBC, WLHK, WTLC, WTLC-FM, WYXB, WDNI-CD

History
- First air date: May 28, 1967; 59 years ago (as WNON-FM)
- Former call signs: WNON-FM (1967–1985); WBCI (1985–1990); WIRE (1990–1998); WYJZ (1998–2007); WNOU (2007–2014); WNOW-FM (2014–2022)
- Call sign meaning: Former calls of 96.3, standing for Hot Hoosier Hits

Technical information
- Licensing authority: FCC
- Facility ID: 6420
- Class: A
- ERP: 6,000 watts
- HAAT: 100 metres (330 ft)
- Transmitter coordinates: 39°48′1.0″N 86°4′39.0″W
- Translators: 105.1 W286CM (Indianapolis, relays HD2)

Links
- Public license information: Public file; LMS
- Webcast: Listen Live; Listen Live (HD2)
- Website: hot1009.com lagrandeindy.com (HD2)

WHHH (100.9 FM, "Hot 100.9") is a radio station licensed to Speedway, Indiana. Owned by Urban One, it broadcasts an mainstream urban format serving the Indianapolis metropolitan area. Its studios are co-located with its sister stations at Meridian Street in downtown Indianapolis, with its transmitter located on the city's east side. WHHH is licensed to broadcast in the HD Radio format.

== History ==
=== Smooth Jazz 100.9 ===
Prior to October 2007, the 100.9 FM frequency was home to WYJZ, a smooth jazz format that began broadcasting on June 15, 1998.

=== RadioNOW 100.9 ===
On October 5, 2007, Emmis Communications announced that it would re-locate 1070 WIBC's talk radio format to the signal of 93.1 WNOU-FM—which had been broadcasting a Top 40/CHR format as 93.1 RadioNOW- in January 2008, so it could launch a new sports radio format on the AM signal. Concurrently, Emmis announced that Radio One had purchased the intellectual property of the RadioNOW format, and would re-launch it on WYJZ; Emmis considered the CHR format to have been unprofitable on WNOU, while Radio One believed that the smooth jazz format was not as profitable as a CHR format. Barry Mayo, the company's president of radio, stated that, "We loved the format, we loved that station and we loved those people". WNOU had begun stunting with Christmas music.

On October 8, 2007, at 4:30 p.m., after playing "Anthem for a New America" by Jeff Lorber, WYJZ dropped its smooth jazz format and began stunting with a loop of an announcer saying "RadioNOW, now at 100.9". At the top of the hour, the station flipped to Top 40/CHR as RadioNOW 100.9; the station launched with no on-air personalities, but Mayo stated that they were "in conversation" with former WNOU personalities. The first song as "RadioNOW" was "Bartender" by T-Pain featuring Akon. The WNOU call letters were moved to WYJZ on October 31, 2007.

By 2009, when Cumulus Media's WRWM picked up the CHR format, WNOU started to lean more rhythmic, while sister station WHHH moved to urban. The rhythmic lean was reduced when WRWM switched to hot adult contemporary. (WRWM has since changed formats.)

On June 30, 2014, WNOU changed its call letters to WNOW-FM, after the previous station carrying those call letters dropped the call sign and rebranded to AMP Radio.

WNOW-FM carried The Joe & Alex Show from 2015 to 2020; from 2018 to 2020, the show was syndicated to sister station KROI-FM in Houston. It was then canceled on February 28, 2020, and WNOW-FM became an affiliate of The Kidd Kraddick Morning Show on March 20.

=== Hot 100.9 ===
On June 13, 2022, Radio One announced that it would acquire Emmis Communications' Indianapolis stations for $22.5 million. To comply with FCC ownership limits, Radio One would divest WHHH (96.3 FM) to the Bible Broadcasting Network, and announced plans to move WHHH's Hot urban contemporary format and call letters to 100.9 FM. On August 13, 2022, at midnight, after playing "Where Are You Now" by Lost Frequencies, WNOW-FM flipped to urban as Hot 100.9; the station temporarily simulcast on 96.3 to redirect listeners to the new signal. The move left WZPL as the only Top 40/CHR station in the market. The transition was completed at midnight on August 30, as the former WHHH switched to religious programming, and changed call letters to WYHX.

=== HD Radio ===
On December 14, 2015, at 3 p.m., WNOW-FM launched an HD2 sub-channel carrying a classic hip hop format, branded as "Boom 102.9" (in reference to translator 102.9 W275BD). The first song on "Boom" was "Straight Outta Compton" by N.W.A. Around July 2018, W275BD was shut down (likely due to interference with nearby WXCH in Columbus, Indiana), with "Boom" going HD-only at that point.

On December 8, 2017, WNOW-FM launched an HD3 sub-channel carrying a regional Mexican format, branded as "La Grande 105.1". Before the launch, the 105.1 translator, W286CM, had been carrying a 1990s-oriented rock format from September until December 2017.
