= WTLC =

WTLC may refer to:

- WTLC (AM), a radio station (1310 AM) licensed to Indianapolis, Indiana, United States
- WTLC-FM, a radio station (106.7 FM) licensed to Greenwood, Indiana, United States
- West Texas and Lubbock Railway
