= WYHX =

Radio station in Indianapolis

Coordinates: 39.776°N 86.153°W

- Indianapolis, Indiana; United States
- Broadcast area: Indianapolis metropolitan area
- Frequency: 96.3 MHz (HD Radio)
- Branding: Bible Broadcasting Network

Programming
- Format: Christian radio

Ownership
- Owner: Bible Broadcasting Network; (Bible Broadcasting Network, Inc.)

History
- First air date: October 28, 1991; 34 years ago
- Former call signs: WHHH (1991–2022); WNOW-FM (2022)

Technical information
- Licensing authority: FCC
- Facility ID: 60207
- Class: A
- ERP: 3,300 watts
- HAAT: 87 meters (285 ft)

Links
- Public license information: Public file; LMS
- Webcast: Listen Live
- Website: bbnradio.org

WYHX (96.3 FM) is a non-commercial radio station in Indianapolis, Indiana. It airs a Christian radio format and is owned by Bible Broadcasting Network.

WYHX has an effective radiated power (ERP) of 3,300 watts, making it a Class A FM station. The transmitter tower is atop the residential high-rise Riley Towers II on North Alabama Street. WYHX broadcasts in the HD Radio hybrid format.

== History ==
On October 28, 1991, WHHH signed on the air. It was owned by a company known as Shirk Inc., with Bill Shirk as the station manager and on air jock, and William Poorman serving as president and general manager. WHHH was known as "Hoosier Hot 96.3 WHHH" or "Hoosier 96" for short. It was the market's first "CHUrban" station (the forerunner to the modern rhythmic contemporary format) that played hip-hop, R&B, freestyle, new jack swing, and house, as well as some dance hits from the Top 40 charts. By the late 1990s, WHHH became a full-fledged rhythmic station as "Hot 96.3."

In 2001, WHHH was acquired by Radio One, a broadcasting company dealing in stations targeting the African American community. Radio One had also acquired Indianapolis' two stations serving the local African-American community for decades, Urban AC WTLC-FM and Urban Gospel WTLC (AM).

WHHH was formerly the Indianapolis affiliate for Russ Parr in the Morning. In 2016, WHHH replaced Russ Parr with The Rickey Smiley Morning Show, which is syndicated by Urban One. In 2018, parent company Radio One was renamed Urban One.

On June 13, 2022, it was announced that Urban One would purchase Emmis Communications' Indianapolis cluster for $22.5 million, and would divest WHHH to comply with FCC ownership limits. Ten days later, it was announced that the station would be sold to the Bible Broadcasting Network, and that WHHH's format and intellectual property would move to WNOW-FM to replace its existing CHR format. While it was initially believed 96.3 would receive the WNOW-FM calls, on June 26, 2022, it was reported that BBN had instead applied for new callsign WYHX upon the move.

In preparation for the sale, WHHH began simulcasting on WNOW-FM on August 13 at midnight to redirect listeners to the new signal.

On August 30, at midnight, BNN officially completed their purchase of WHHH, switching the station's call letters to WYHX, and flipped the station's format to Christian programming.
