= ESPN Radio 950 =

ESPN Radio 950 may refer to:

- ESPN Radio 950 serving the Philadelphia, PA market
- ESPN Radio 950 serving the Richmond, VA market
- ESPN Radio 950 serving the Indianapolis, IN market
