= WFDM =

WFDM may refer to:

- WFDM (AM), a radio station (1400 AM) licensed to Fort Walton Beach, Florida, United States
- WFDM-FM, a radio station (95.9 FM) licensed to Franklin, Indiana, United States
