= Star Stations =

American radio broadcasting company

The Star Stations was an American radio broadcasting company owned by Don W. Burden. At its end, Star Stations owned five radio stations in Omaha, Indianapolis, and Vancouver, Washington. These stations had their licenses not renewed by the Federal Communications Commission in the culmination of a years-long investigation into political influence scandals at several Star outlets; four of the five ceased broadcasting on September 2, 1976, while a fifth continued to operate without going silent through a transition to a new owner on a new license.

== Foundation and growth ==
Don W. Burden, then the sales manager of radio station KWIK in Pocatello, Idaho, was part of a group that acquired Omaha radio station KOIL (1290 AM) from the Nebraska Rural Radio Association, a cooperative of farmers and ranchers, in 1954. Burden acquired KWIK outright in 1957. Star grew into a group in 1958 when Burden acquired KMYR (710 AM) in Denver. A year later, he acquired KVAN in Vancouver, Washington, opposite Portland, Oregon, for $580,000; Burden relaunched it as KISN, the first Top 40 radio station in Portland, on May 1, 1959. The launch of KISN was highly promoted; after 24 hours of playing "terrible music" on KVAN and asking listeners, "Do you want a revolution?", it began with a $40,000 promotion blitz. Later that year, a second studio, the "KISN Corner", opened at 10th and West Burnside streets in Portland, featuring a street-level studio where passersby could look in.

Burden exited Pocatello in 1959 by selling his interest in KWIK to other parties. He sold the Denver station, by then known as KICN, in 1961; the station had lost its fight against formidable competitor KIMN.

The company made its final two expansions in the early 1960s. Star's first FM was purchased in 1960: KCOM, a standalone Omaha station that had signed on the previous September. KCOM became KOIL-FM, which briefly was separately programmed before becoming a simulcast of KOIL, then adopting the KICN call letters after the Denver station was sold. In 1963, the Star Stations made their final acquisition: the WISH radio stations in Indianapolis, as owner Corinthian Broadcasting opted to focus on their television station chain. WISH-AM-FM became WIFE-AM-FM after the sale; the AM station relaunched January 1, 1964, amid heavy promotion.

== Ratings success and early FCC trouble ==
In the early 1960s, activities at several Star stations resulted in disciplinary actions from the Federal Communications Commission.

In 1964, the FCC handed WIFE a short-term license renewal over misrepresentations of the results of an audience survey commissioned by the Indianapolis station. WIFE used incomplete tabulations of a rating survey conducted by C. E. Hooper and Company in sales pitches to potential advertisers. After receiving a second short-term renewal in 1965, the FCC designated WIFE's license for hearing in 1966 over two contests conducted over the station in late 1964. The FCC Broadcast Bureau initially recommended a denial in 1967; WIFE ultimately received a renewal of its license through to 1970; in November 1969, Burden took out a full-page advertisement in the Indianapolis Star newspaper, titled "WIFE tells it like it really was", seeking to dispel the bad reputation that the troubles had caused.

Star's regulatory troubles at Vancouver stemmed from KISN's constant attempts to identify as a Portland station. In 1962, the FCC assessed a $2,000 fine against it for improper station identifications. Three years later, the commission ordered KISN to cease and desist from linking itself to Portland on its air, and fined the station $20,000.

At the time that WIFE received its first short-term renewal, Star had planned to purchase 1240 AM in Charlotte as part of a deal that would have seen WIST (the station on that frequency) buy out the superior facilities of WAYS (610 AM). However, the FCC rejected Burden as a buyer, prompting both purchases to collapse.

WIFE was taking the teen market of Indianapolis by storm. Soon, there was no other station to listen to for my friends and me and seemingly 99 percent of all the other teens in town. Which meant that my parents were in great company because 99 percent of the parents of teens in Indianapolis also were going bananas.

— Bob Williams, looking back in 1983 on WIFE's cultural impact

Even as these proceedings were under way, Star remained a successful company. In 1968, it opened a new, $1.5 million headquarters building on Omaha's west side, also housing KOIL-AM-FM; at the open house, William Shatner was the doorman. Its three AM stations-KISN, KOIL and WIFE-were top-rated Top 40 success stories known for their aggressive promotions. KISN held a contest to "give away" station personality Tom Murphy, but the winner received Tom Murphy-an Irish setter. Each station, at one point, had an on-air personality using the name Roger W. Morgan. A billboard near the Indianapolis airport greeted travelers with the message, "We've been spending all night and day with your WIFE"; similar billboards were erected in Omaha and Portland. The Omaha station stole listeners from KOWH, which, though owned by Top 40 pioneer Todd Storz, could not broadcast at night; though Storz downplayed this flaw when Burden told him about it, ratings had shifted for several years after KOIL launched, and KOWH exited the format in December 1959.

== Political scandal and license revocations ==
At the end of the decade, however, a new and ultimately fatal scandal broke out at the Star Stations. Along party lines, in November 1969, the House Commerce Committee voted to cite FCC chairman Rosel H. Hyde for contempt of Congress, a day before his retirement, over Hyde's refusal to produce confidential documents related to the WIFE license renewal hearing. Months later, Indianapolis Broadcasting, Inc. (IBI), filed to build a new radio station on 1310 kHz, WIFE's AM frequency, in a direct challenge to Burden. In late October 1970, John McLaughlin, then the Republican candidate for United States Senator from Rhode Island against incumbent John Pastore, called for an ethics investigation into one of Pastore's aides, the chief counsel of the Senate communications subcommittee, who received a silver set and other gifts from Burden while his licenses were up for renewal.

On December 2, 1970, after a nine-month internal review, the FCC put all five Star Stations' license renewals up for hearing in a consolidated proceeding with the Indianapolis Broadcasting application. The commission would cover 22 issues in the hearing, including charges of illegal gifts of air time and coverage to Senator Vance Hartke of Indiana during his 1964 reelection campaign and a contribution to Senator Mark Hatfield of Oregon in 1966 and directed the Star stations in those markets to promote those candidates. The hearing designation order also touched on claims that Burden had wiretapped witnesses in prior WIFE hearings and a gift of a $444 tractor to the president of C. E. Hooper. One issue struck at the heart of political corruption: according to the order, on the day in 1966 that county commissioners in Multnomah County, Oregon, overrode the planning commission to approve a new KISN transmitter site, Burden asked an employee to send him $10,000, in $100 bills, for the purpose of contributing to the commissioners that had supported the measure. Rounding out the order were additional questions over harassment of former employees, supervision of on-air contests, and lack of candor with the FCC. At the same time, the commission opened a hearing into potential illegal Burden involvement at WPDQ in Jacksonville, Florida, with whose owner Burden held a management agreement. Burden vigorously fought the hearing, unsuccessfully appealing to the United States Court of Appeals for the District of Columbia Circuit in a bid to stop it. In November 1972, the FCC Broadcast Bureau recommended denial of all five license renewals, finding against the Star Stations on all 22 issues in the hearing; in the decision, the bureau noted that it expected a high level of performance when it granted the six-month renewal to the WIFE stations in 1969 and did not get it.

Compared to prior years, Star fared better at the FCC in early 1973. In March, Administrative law judge Chester Naumowicz recommended that the WIFE AM license be denied, with the frequency awarded to competing applicant Indianapolis Broadcasting, with the other stations' licenses renewed; the basis of the denial for WIFE AM rested on the Hartke issues, but Naumowicz found that Burden was not aware of them and pinned the blame on the general manager of that station. The commission ordered a review of the WIFE AM portion of the decision in April, and placed an additional character qualification question against rival IBI. Naumowicz, however, stuck by his ruling against WIFE. Meanwhile, KOIL, the company flagship in Omaha, was roiled by competition from WOW and growing strife between staff and management.

On January 31, 1975, by a 5-1 vote, the FCC ruled against the Star Stations on all counts, denying all five licenses and approving the Indianapolis Broadcasting application for a new station to replace WIFE AM. The commission concluded that Burden was in on the Hartke promotion scheme; Burden immediately announced an appeal. The action was a landmark for the commission, as it was the first time a commercial broadcaster had been stripped of all of its licenses at once and was termed as the biggest denial action in FCC history; although he "reluctantly" concurred, commissioner James H. Quello called the action "harsh in the extreme". Syndicated columnist James J. Kilpatrick adopted the view of FCC commissioner Robert E. Lee, fretting that the "death sentence" raised First Amendment concerns.

Burden's appeal was rejected when the Court of Appeals affirmed the FCC's decision on December 12, 1975. The news director of KOIL resigned in March 1976 after refusing to play a tape critical of an applicant seeking interim authority to operate the Star Omaha stations. On June 1, operation of WIFE AM transferred to the new Indianapolis Broadcasting license, retaining the call letters and format of the Burden station which had months before been separated from WIFE-FM, which went by the on-air name "CB-108" in its final months of broadcasting to avoid confusion.

After the Supreme Court of the United States declined to review the Court of Appeals decision in May 1976, the FCC ordered all Star Stations to cease broadcasting on September 2. With the exception of WIFE AM, which continued under Indianapolis Broadcasting using the same call letters, the stations each signed off at 12:01 a.m. local time.

== Legacy ==
After the closure of the four remaining Star Stations, listeners waited several months for a replacement in Omaha and as long as eight years in Indianapolis. An interim operator, Beneficial Broadcasting, was appointed to continue broadcasting of the Star Omaha stations, which returned to the air in December 1976; adjudication of KOIL and KEFM to permanent licensees was not resolved until 1982. Two frequencies remained silent until being filled by new stations: a new station on 910 at Vancouver did not begin until April 1, 1980, while the FM frequency left open in Indianapolis did not return until WTPI signed on October 15, 1984.

Burden would make a return to broadcasting in 1980 with an agreement to purchase KPEN in Los Altos, California. The FCC slated a hearing in January 1982 on the application, which was eventually approved. Burden, who owned 49 percent of KPEN, served as its general manager; the station was sold in 1984.

Burden died of lung cancer in San Mateo, California, on May 12, 1985, at 56 years of age.

== Stations owned ==
The Star Stations group owned five radio stations whose licenses were revoked. It had additionally owned two stations that were sold in 1959 and 1961.

† AM station	‡ FM station

Market	Station	Years owned	Successor
Omaha	† KOIL 1290	1954-1976	KOIL (est. 1976) (Note: The Omaha stations were off air for three months before interim operator Beneficial Broadcasting began operations.)
Omaha	‡ KEFM 96.1	1960-1976	KISO (est. 1976)
Vancouver	† KISN 910	1959-1976	KMTT (est. 1980)
Indianapolis	† WIFE 1310	1963-1976	WTLC (est. 1976) (Note: Indianapolis Broadcasting took over WIFE on June 1, 1976, retaining the call letters and format. This station did not go off the air.)
Indianapolis	‡ WIFE-FM 107.9	1963-1976	WNTR (est. 1984)
Denver	† KMYR/KICN 710	1958-1961	N/A
Pocatello	† KWIK 1240	1953-1959	N/A
