= WIFE-FM (Indianapolis) =

Radio station in Indianapolis, Indiana, United States (1961–1976)

- Indianapolis, Indiana; United States
- Frequency: 107.9 MHz
- Branding: CB-108

Programming
- Format: Top 40

Ownership
- Owner: Star Stations; (Star Stations of Indiana, Inc.)
- Sister stations: WIFE (1310 AM)

History
- First air date: October 22, 1961
- Last air date: September 2, 1976 (14 years, 316 days)
- Former call signs: WISH-FM (1961–1963)

WIFE-FM was a radio station broadcasting on 107.9 FM in Indianapolis, Indiana, United States. Owned and operated by the Star Stations group for most of its history, it broadcast from October 22, 1961, to September 2, 1976.

== History ==
Indiana Broadcasting Company, owner of WISH (1310 AM), was granted a construction permit to build a new radio station on 107.9 FM in Indianapolis on July 21, 1960. Construction on WISH-FM, which would be the fourth commercial FM outlet in Indianapolis and one of the most powerful in the state, was underway by March 1961. The station began broadcasting on October 22, 1961, simulcasting WISH's full service output beginning at noon and airing taped musical programs after 7 p.m. In January 1962, WISH-FM began to air an hour a day of stereo programming, making it the first station with regular stereo broadcasts in the area.

When Corinthian Broadcasting, which owned the WISH radio stations and WISH-TV (channel 8), decided to focus on its chain of television stations, the radio operations were sold to the Star Stations group of Omaha, Nebraska, in 1963 for $1.25 million. WISH-AM-FM became WIFE-AM-FM after the sale. The two stations initially simulcast, and as a result, the issues that were faced by the WIFE AM operation affected the FM license as well. After receiving a second short-term renewal in 1965, the Federal Communications Commission designated WIFE's licenses for hearing in 1966 over two contests conducted over the station in late 1964. The FCC Broadcast Bureau initially recommended a denial in 1967. WIFE ultimately received a renewal of its license through to 1970; in November 1969, Burden took out a full-page advertisement in the Indianapolis Star newspaper, titled "WIFE tells it like it really was", seeking to dispel the bad reputation that the troubles had caused. Eventually, WIFE-FM became an automated beautiful music station; in 1967, it was noted as playing "the best of Broadway and show tunes", airing just eight commercials per hour with a policy of no hard jingles. It had just two dedicated staff.

Revelations that the Indianapolis and Portland, Oregon-area Star Stations operations had been involved in favorable treatment to candidates for United States Senate, including Vance Hartke in Indiana, led to a five-year revocation hearing that spanned the early 1970s. While a competing applicant—Indianapolis Broadcasting, Inc.—sought the WIFE AM frequency, there was no comparable challenger seeking the WIFE-FM license. While earlier actions opened the door to WIFE AM being transferred to new ownership while Burden was allowed to retain the other stations, this was overturned by the commission in January 1975, when the FCC denied renewals to all of the Star Stations. Burden filed two court appeals, which failed; the FCC also denied a last-minute application by Indianapolis Broadcasting, which had taken over WIFE AM on June 1, 1976, to operate WIFE-FM on an interim basis.

As the new Indianapolis Broadcasting-owned WIFE opted to retain the call letters and format of the preceding station, Star Stations owner Don W. Burden moved to rebrand WIFE-FM to avoid confusion with its former stablemate. In the spring of 1976, WIFE-FM changed formats from beautiful music to country rebranded as "CB-108", and Burden requested—but never received—the call letters WXCB, which prompted opposition from WXTZ (103.3 FM).

The station closed at 12:01 a.m. on September 2, 1976, as prescribed by the FCC; Jay Reynolds of WIFE AM gave the final announcement over the station, and nine jobs were lost with its closure.

=== Hearings for a successor ===
With no interim operator for the 107.9 FM frequency in Indianapolis, WIFE-FM's closure opened the door for new applications. After receiving nine applications by the November 1976 cut-off date, the FCC designated five bids for comparative hearing in 1978, from Peoples Broadcasting Corporation; Radio Circle City, headed by former WIFE-AM-FM general manager Robert Kiley; Mediacom; Radio Corporation of Indiana, consisting of several local investors; and Indianapolis Communications Corporation.

The FCC did not rule in favor of any of the applications until May 1982, when it selected Peoples. However, the winning applicant had developed a flaw in the intervening years, as Peoples head Joseph Cantor died in September 1981. FCC rules which froze the qualifications of competing applicants at a certain point in time meant that the two ruling administrative law judges had to consider Peoples as if Cantor was still alive. The losing bidders appealed, but the FCC review board and the full commission upheld the decision. Peoples would begin broadcasting over 107.9 MHz as WTPI on October 15, 1984, more than eight years after WIFE-FM's closure.
