= Reb Porter =

American public address announcer

Rebel Porter is a retired American public address (PA) announcer who worked for the Indiana Pacers basketball team of the NBA until retiring in 2010. Porter also worked as an announcer/disk jockey for the legendary WIFE (AM-1310) in Indianapolis during that station's heyday in the 1960s.

Porter created a Pacers tradition during his tenure on the PA microphone, with his unique call of the NBA's mandatory two-minutes remaining announcement: "Two minutes, two-ahh!" After his retirement, Pacers fans continue that tradition, albeit in a somewhat modified form, as when former PA announcer Michael Grady mentions that a Pacers player is going to the free-throw line for "two shots", the crowd then replies with the "Two-ahh".
