= Emmis Corporation =

American media conglomerate

- Formerly: Emmis Broadcasting (1979–1998); Emmis Communications (1998–2022)
- Type: Public
- Traded as: Expert Market: EMMS
- Industry: Broadcasting
- Founded: 1979; 47 years ago
- Founder: Jeff Smulyan
- Headquarters: Indianapolis, Indiana, U.S.
- Services: Radio
- Revenue: 114,131,000 United States dollar (2019)
- Number of employees: 350 (2019)
- Website: emmis.com

Emmis Corporation is an American media conglomerate based in Indianapolis, Indiana, United States. Emmis, based on the Hebrew word for "Truth" (Emet) was founded by Jeff Smulyan in 1979. Emmis has owned many radio stations, including KPWR and WQHT, which have notoriety for their Hip Hop Rhythmic format as well as WFAN, which was the world's first 24-hour sports talk radio station. In addition to radio, Emmis has invested in TV, publishing, and mobile operations throughout the U.S.

== History ==
=== 1970s ===
In 1979, Emmis Broadcasting founder Jeffrey Smulyan purchased his first radio station, WSVL-FM Shelbyville, Indiana.

=== 1980s ===
In July 1981, Smulyan changed the format from country music to adult contemporary and renamed the station WENS and later to WLHK.

In 1982, Emmis acquired WLOL in Minneapolis and quickly became a top contender for ratings.

Around 1984, the company bought Magic 106 in Los Angeles, California; at the time, L.A. Lakers player "Magic" Johnson was an early spokesperson for the station. Emmis also bought KSHE in St. Louis in the same year.

In early 1986, Emmis changed Magic 106, which focused on traditional top 40 rock, to Power 106 KPWR, which would focus on dance, top40, and shock-jock talk.

In 1987, Emmis made a series of purchases including WQHT, WYNY, and WNBC in New York, WKQX in Chicago, WJIB in Boston, WKUU and KXXX in San Francisco. They also acquired WAVA-FM in Washington, D.C. from the Doubleday Broadcasting Company. Both KPWR and WQHT would pioneer the urban contemporary rhythmic format. Emmis transformed WHN into the world's first all-sports radio station, WFAN.

In 1988, Emmis entered the world of publishing. Emmis purchased Indianapolis Monthly and added WMAQ's FM sister station, WKQX in Chicago to its radio portfolio. Also, Emmis acquired five NBC radio stations in 1988, moving WFAN's calls and programming in New York to WNBC.

Chairman and CEO Jeff Smulyan purchased the Seattle Mariners Major League Baseball team in 1989.

=== 1990s ===
Emmis kicked off the 1990s by selling KNRJ in Houston to Nationwide Communications in May 1990.

In 1991, Emmis sold two more stations: WLOL to Minnesota Public Radio and KXXX, San Francisco, to Alliance Broadcasting. Also in 1991, KMGG became KPWR, "Power 106" and became the first rhythmic contemporary-focused top 40 formatted outlet.

In 1992, Emmis sold WFAN, New York, to Infinity for US$70M, which was one of the highest prices ever paid for an AM radio station. Emmis also sold WAVA-FM, Washington D.C., to Salem Broadcasting and WJIB, Boston, to Greater Media. In the same year, Jeff Smulyan sold the Seattle Mariners to Nintendo.

Emmis grew its publishing portfolio by adding Atlanta Magazine in 1993. In the same year, Emmis launched its second hip hop station in America, Hot 97. Emmis' Q101 in Chicago moved into an Alternative Rock Format.

In 1994, the company purchased WIBC (now WFNI) and WKLR (now WIBC) in Indianapolis from the Horizon Broadcast Corporation and WRKS in New York City from the Summit Communications Group. WKLR was changed from an oldies format to a classic hits format with the call letters of WNAP-FM in September 1994. Emmis became a public company, EMMS on NASDAQ, with an IPO on March 4, 1994.

The following year, 1995, WQHT and KPWR were among the top rated radio station in each of their markets. This resulted in a record-breaking accomplishment where Emmis was the first company to own top rated radio stations in the top 2 markets. Later in 1996, WHHH (formerly WTLC-AM/FM) became top rated for urban adult contemporary.

Emmis entered the world of international radio in 1997 when the company was awarded a license to operate in Hungary, Sláger Radio, which debuted #1 nationwide and remained the country's most popular national radio station until the Hungarian government revoked the license in 2009. Emmis added Cincinnati Magazine to its publishing group, as well as KIHT-FM and KPNT-FM in St. Louis to its rock collection.

In 1998, Emmis Broadcasting changed its name to Emmis Communications and moved into its current headquarters on Monument Circle in Indianapolis. Emmis acquired a lot of media in the same year including Texas Monthly, WRXP in New York, WTHI and WWVR in Terre Haute, and six television stations in Honolulu, New Orleans, Green Bay, and Mobile, Alabama, from SF Broadcasting and in Terre Haute, Indiana, and Ft. Myers, Florida, from Wabash Valley Broadcasting. RadioNow was launched in Indianapolis as a Top 40 format.

Emmis purchased Country Sampler Magazine in 1999 and Liberty Media purchased 2.7 million shares of Emmis for approximately $150M.

=== 2000s ===
On March 3, 2003, Luci Baines Johnson (the daughter of former first lady Lady Bird Johnson) announced that the family had sold their 50.1% stake of LBJS Broadcasting Company to Emmis for $105 million. The company brand was renamed to Emmis Austin Radio Broadcasting Co, L.P.

In 2005, Emmis changed the format of its first radio station from its long-term adult contemporary format to country, and the call letters were changed from WENS to WLHK. Emmis was also named one of Fortune's 100 Best Companies to Work For. In March of that year, Emmis Communications and 98.7 KISS-FM, New York, celebrated Women's History Month by introducing their first annual salute to Phenomenal Women (also referred to as the Phenomenal Woman Awards).

From 2005 to 2013, Emmis owns three radio networks in Bulgaria: Radio FM+, Radio Fresh! and Star FM.

In 2006, Emmis flipped KZLA Los Angeles to a rhythmic adult contemporary format as "KMVN, Movin' 93.9". The move gave Emmis a companion station to complement KPWR. However, on April 15, 2009, KMVN switched to Spanish-language programming, KXOS, under a seven-year Local Marketing Agreement with Grupo Radio Centro of Mexico City.

On June 9, 2009, Emmis announced it had formed a strategic alliance with StreamTheWorld, the radio industry's streaming technology and services company, to put all Emmis radio stations on a new streaming platform.

=== 2010s ===
On January 12, 2011, the share price of Emmis stock surged 42% as insiders speculated that the company could be close to selling off several of its radio stations. In its January 2011 filing with the Securities and Exchange Commission, the company reported that it had the necessary cash to survive through February 2011. "Absent asset sales, which the company is actively pursuing," Emmis attorneys stated in the regulatory filing, "the company believes it is unlikely it will be able to maintain compliance with the financial covenants after Sept. 1, 2011".

On August 16, 2013, Emmis launched the NextRadio smartphone app on HTC One Android phones from Sprint. A deal struck between the radio industry and Sprint facilitated the launch which subsequently enabled FM radio support for the app on additional Android devices available on the Sprint wireless network.

On October 12, 2016, Emmis announced that it would sell its radio stations in the Terre Haute cluster to Midwest Communications and DLC Media. Midwest Communications would acquire WTHI-FM and the intellectual property of WWVR while DLC Media would acquire WFNF, WFNB and the broadcast license for WWVR. Midwest Communications would also sell WDKE to DLC Media to stay under FCC ownership limits. The sale was consummated on January 27, 2017.

In 2014, Emmis acquired New York radio stations WBLS and WLIB from YMF Media for $131 million in cash.

On March 1, 2017, Emmis announced it had sold four of its magazines (Atlanta, Cincinnati, Los Angeles, and Orange Coast) to Hour Media Group, LLC for $6.5 million. It also sold Texas Monthly to Genesis Park, LP for $25 million.

On May 9, 2017, Emmis announced that it would sell KPWR to The Meruelo Group for $82.75 million. The announcement came after Emmis made a deal in April with its lenders to seek $80 million worth of divestments by January 2018 to amend its credit agreement. The Meruelo Group began operating the station under an LMA on July 1, 2017, until the sale was consummated on August 1, 2017.

On January 30, 2018, Emmis announced it would leave the St. Louis market, selling KSHE and KPNT to Hubbard Broadcasting, and KFTK and KNOU to Entercom.

On June 10, 2019, Emmis announced that it would sell its controlling stake in its Austin stations to its minority partner Sinclair Telecable (d/b/a Sinclair Communications, unrelated to Sinclair Broadcast Group) for $39.3 million.

On July 1, 2019, Emmis announced that it would sell its New York City stations WQHT and WBLS to Mediaco Holding—an affiliate of Standard General—for $91.5 million, a $5 million promissory note, and a 23.72% stake in the new company. Mediaco Holding will be a public company, and Emmis will continue to manage the stations. The sale was completed November 25, 2019.

=== 2020s ===
On March 11, 2020, Emmis announced that it had purchased sound masking technology company Lencore Acoustics.

On April 24, 2020, Emmis announced that it would voluntarily delist from the Nasdaq, citing cost-saving concerns.

On June 13, 2022, Emmis announced it will sell its Indianapolis radio properties to Urban One for an undisclosed amount.

In August 2022, Emmis Communications changed its name to Emmis Corporation.

In December 2022, Emmis sold Indianapolis Monthly to Hour Media for an undisclosed amount.

== Company portfolio ==
=== Lencore Acoustics ===
Emmis acquired Lencore in 2020. They build systems for Sound Masking, Paging and Audio with applications in a variety of industries. Major clients include: Amazon, AT&T, CVS Health, Coca-Cola, Ford, Ernst & Young, Michelin among many others.

=== Digonex ===
Emmis acquired Digonex in 2014. Digonex is a technology company.

=== Former magazines ===
- Atlanta
- Cincinnati
- Indianapolis Monthly
- Los Angeles
- Orange Coast
- Texas Monthly

=== NextRadio app ===
NextRadio Live Guide

The NextRadio smartphone app was developed by Emmis, with support from the National Association of Broadcasters, to enable FM radio reception on mobile devices with activated internal FM receivers. NextRadio allows users of many FM-enabled smartphones to listen to broadcast FM radio—with no need for Internet connection or use of phone data—and receive supplemental data such as album art, program information, and metadata over the Internet if connected. Launched in August 2013 through a radio industry agreement with Sprint Corporation, the app was preloaded on some devices, and available for download in the Google Play Store of Android applications.

The NextRadio app is powered by TagStation, an Emmis-developed cloud data service for enhanced radio broadcasting. TagStation allows broadcasters a web-based platform for managing supplemental content for delivery to the NextRadio app, HD Radio receivers, and connected car dashboards.

During the quarter ended November 30, 2018, Emmis decided to dramatically reduce the scale of operations in TagStation, LLC and NextRadio, LLC. In connection with this decision, the company recognized $1.2 million of severance related to the termination of 35 employees. Emmis Chairman and CEO Jeff Smulyan said on the company's second quarter earnings call that Emmis was "unwilling and unable" to continue funding the NextRadio and TagStation businesses.

In January 2019, Radio World published a long article analyzing NextRadio's operation and failure, suggesting that the long-term, unfulfilled, hope was that the radio industry could eventually monetize the NextRadio app, in part by providing advertisers with good analytical information and insights into radio's return on investment.

As of the end of 2021 version 6.0.2492 (January 2, 2019) of the NextRadio app remained available on the Google Play Store.

=== WorldBand Media HD Radio deal ===
Emmis announced on September 9, 2008, that it had teamed up with digital radio network WorldBand Media and would be using the "HD-3" subchannels to produce programming for the South Asian communities in Chicago (on WLUP), Los Angeles (on KPWR), and New York (on WQHT), and would include a combination of local and international content that should be available by mid-October 2008.

=== Current radio stations ===
AM Station	FM Station

City of license / Market	Station	Owned since	Current format
Indianapolis, IN	WFNI 1070	1994	Sports radio (WIBC-HD2 simulcast)
New York, NY	WEPN-FM 98.7	1994	Latin pop–adult contemporary music
New York, NY	WLIB 1190	2014	Simulcast of WEPN-FM

=== Former television stations ===
In May 2005, Emmis announced its intent to sell some or all of the 16 television stations they owned at the time. In August 2005, the company announced the sale of nine television stations, as well as four more in October, an additional station in May 2006, another station in February 2007, and its final station in May 2008. Emmis no longer owns any television stations.

Stations are arranged alphabetically by state and by city of license.

City of license / Market	Station	Channel	Years owned	Current status
Mobile–Gulf Shores, AL	WALA-TV	10	1998–2005 (Note: Purchased by Emmis from Silver King Broadcasting in 1998.)	Fox affiliate owned by Gray Media
Mobile–Gulf Shores, AL	WBPG	55	2003–2006	The CW station WFNA, owned and operated by Nexstar Media Group
Tucson, AZ	KGUN	9	2000–2005 (Note: Owned by Lee Enterprises prior to its acquisition by Emmis in 2000.)	ABC affiliate owned by the E. W. Scripps Company
Cape Coral–Fort Myers–Naples, FL	WFTX-TV	36	1998–2005	Fox affiliate owned by the Sun Broadcasting
Clermont–Orlando–Daytona Beach, FL	WKCF	18	1998–2006	The CW affiliate owned by Hearst Television
Honolulu, HI	KHON-TV	2	1998–2006	Fox affiliate owned by Nexstar Media Group
Honolulu, HI	KGMB	9	2000–2007	MyNetworkTV affiliate KHII-TV, owned by Nexstar Media Group (Note: KGMB and KFVE traded station licenses in 2009; KGMB now broadcasts on channel 5 (23) and is owned by Gray Media.)
Terre Haute, IN	WTHI-TV	10	1998–2005	CBS affiliate owned by Allen Media Broadcasting
Topeka, KS	KSNT	27	2000–2006	NBC affiliate owned by Nexstar Media Group
Wichita–Hutchinson, KS	KSNW	3	2000–2006	NBC affiliate owned by Nexstar Media Group
Great Bend, KS	KSNC (Note: Satellite of KSNW.)	2	2000–2006	NBC affiliate owned by Nexstar Media Group
Garden City, KS	KSNG	11	2000–2006	NBC affiliate owned by Nexstar Media Group
McCook, NE	KSNK	8	2000–2006	NBC affiliate owned by Nexstar Media Group
New Orleans, LA	WVUE-DT	8	1998–2008	Fox affiliate owned by Gray Media
Grand Rapids–Battle Creek–Kalamazoo, MI	WXMI	17	1998 (Note: Traded to Tribune Broadcasting for Tribune's WQCD New York City.)	Fox affiliate owned by the E. W. Scripps Company
Omaha, NE–Council Bluffs, IA	KMTV	3	2000–2007	CBS affiliate owned by the E. W. Scripps Company (Note: Journal Broadcast Group operated KMTV under a local marketing agreement from 2005 until 2007.)
Manchester, NH	WMUR-TV	9	2000–2001 (Note: Was swapped in 2001 for Hearst-Argyle's KKLT, KMVP and KTAR-AM Phoenix; all three of which were subsequently sold to Bonneville International.)	ABC affiliate owned by Hearst Television
Albuquerque–Santa Fe, NM	KRQE	13	2000–2005	CBS affiliate owned by Nexstar Media Group
Portland, OR	KOIN	6	2000–2006	CBS affiliate owned by Nexstar Media Group
Tacoma–Seattle, WA	KTZZ	22	1998	MyNetworkTV affiliate KZJO, owned by Fox Television Stations
Huntington–Charleston, WV	WSAZ-TV	3	2000–2005	NBC affiliate owned by Gray Media
Green Bay, WI	WLUK-TV	11	1998–2005	Fox affiliate owned by Sinclair Broadcast Group

=== Former radio stations ===
AM Station	FM Station

City of license / Market	Station	Years owned	Current status
Phoenix, AZ	KKFR 92.3	2000–2006	KTAR-FM, owned by Bonneville International
Phoenix, AZ	KKLT 98.7	2000–2004 (Note: Traded to Bonneville International in exchange for WLUP-FM in Chicago.)	KMVP-FM, owned by Bonneville International
Phoenix, AZ	KMVP 860	2000–2004	KNAI, owned by Farmworker Educational Radio Network
Phoenix, AZ	KTAR 620	2000–2004	Owned by Bonneville International
Los Angeles, CA	KMGG/KPWR 105.9	1984–2017	Owned by The Meruelo Group
Los Angeles, CA	KZLA/KMVN/KXOS 93.9	2000–2012	KLLI, owned by The Meruelo Group
San Francisco, CA	KYUU/KXXX 99.7	1988–1991	KMVQ-FM, owned by Bonneville International
Chicago, IL	WKQX 101.1	1988–2011	Owned by Cumulus Media (Note: WKQX's intellectual property was divested to a third party in 2011 and was used for an internet radio station bearing the "Q101" name; Cumulus re-acquired this intellectual property in 2022.)
Chicago, IL	WLUP-FM 97.9	2004–2011	WCKL, owned by Educational Media Foundation
Indianapolis, IN	WENS/WLHK 97.1	1981–2022	Owned by Urban One
Indianapolis, IN	WKLR/WNAP-FM/WNOU/ WEXM/WIBC 93.1	1994–2022	Owned by Urban One
Indianapolis, IN	WTLC 1310	1997–2001	Owned by Urban One
Indianapolis, IN	WTLC-FM/WYXB 105.7	1997–2022	Owned by Urban One
Terre Haute, IN	WTHI-FM 99.9	1998–2016	Owned by Midwest Communications
Terre Haute, IN	WFNB 92.7	2012–2016	WFNF, owned by JKO Media Group
Terre Haute, IN	WFNF 1130	2012–2016	WFNB, owned by JKO Media Group
Terre Haute, IN	WWVR 105.5	1998–2016	WVIG, owned by JKO Media Group
Boston, MA	WJIB/WCDJ 96.9	1988–1993	WBQT, owned by Beasley Broadcast Group
St. Paul–Minneapolis, MN	WLOL-FM 99.5	1982–1991	KSJN, owned by Minnesota Public Radio
St. Louis, MO	KFTK 1490 (Note: Operated a translator, K254CR (98.7 FM).)	2016–2018 (Note: License owned by Entertainment Media Trust d/b/a "Insane Broadcasting" but controlled by Robert Romanik; Emmis programmed the station under a local marketing agreement.)	Defunct, license revoked in 2020
St. Louis, MO	KIHT/KNOU 96.3	2000–2018	WFUN-FM, owned by Audacy, Inc.
St. Louis, MO	KPNT 105.7	2000–2018	Owned by Hubbard Broadcasting
St. Louis, MO	KSHE 94.7	1984–2018	Owned by Hubbard Broadcasting
St. Louis, MO	KXOK-FM/KFTK/ KFTK-FM 97.1	2000–2018	Owned by Audacy, Inc.
St. Louis, MO	WIL-FM 92.3	2000 (Note: Traded to Bonneville International in exchange for KZLA-FM in Los Angeles.)	Owned by Hubbard Broadcasting
St. Louis, MO	WKBQ-FM/WALC/WXTM-FM/ WMML/WRDA 104.1	1996–2005	KMOX-FM, owned by Audacy, Inc.
St. Louis, MO	WKKX 106.5	1996–2000	WARH, owned by Hubbard Broadcasting
St. Louis, MO	WRTH 1430	2000	Defunct, license revoked as KZQZ in 2020
St. Louis, MO	WVRV 101.1	2000	WXOS, owned by Hubbard Broadcasting
New York City, NY	WHN/WFAN 1050	1986–1988	WEPN, owned by Good Karma Brands
New York City, NY	WFAN 660	1988–1992	Owned by Audacy, Inc.
New York City, NY	WAPP/WQHT 103.5	1986–1988	WKTU, owned by iHeartMedia
New York City, NY	WQHT 97.1	1988–2019	Owned by Mediaco Holding (Standard General)
New York City, NY	WQCD/WRXP 101.9	1997–2011	WFAN-FM, owned by Audacy, Inc.
New York City, NY	WBLS 107.5	2014–2019	Owned by Mediaco Holding (Standard General)
Austin, TX	KEYI-FM/KBPA 103.5	2003–2019 (Note: Sinclair Telecable held a minority share in the station group; it is not to be confused with Sinclair Broadcast Group.)	Owned by Sinclair Telecable, Inc.
Austin, TX	KDHT/KGSR 93.3	2003–2019	Owned by Sinclair Telecable, Inc.
Austin, TX	KLBJ 590 (Note: Operated a translator, K259AJ (99.7 FM).)	2003–2019	Owned by Sinclair Telecable, Inc.
Austin, TX	KLBJ-FM 93.7	2003–2019	Owned by Sinclair Telecable, Inc.
Austin, TX	KLZT 107.1	2003–2019	Owned by Sinclair Telecable, Inc.
Austin, TX	KROX-FM 101.5	2003–2019	Owned by Sinclair Telecable, Inc.
Houston, TX	KKHT-FM 96.5	1988–1990	KHMX, owned by Audacy, Inc.
Arlington, VA–Washington, D.C.	WAVA-FM 105.1	1986–1992	Owned by Salem Media Group

== Board of directors ==
- Jeff Smulyan – Chairman of the Board, President and CEO; former owner of Major League Baseball's Seattle Mariners
- Emmis_Corporation
- Susan Bayh – Visiting Professor, Butler University
- Gary Kaseff – Executive Vice President and General Counsel
- Richard Leventhal – President & Majority Owner of LMCS, LLC.
- Peter Lund – Media Consultant and former President & CEO of CBS Television.
- Greg Nathanson – former Television Division President
- Lawrence Sorrel – Tailwind Capital Partners
- Patrick Walsh – Chief Operating Officer and Chief Financial Officer

== See also ==
- Economy of Indianapolis
- Media in Indianapolis
