= WTLC-FM =

Coordinates: 39.712°N 86.146°W

Greenwood, Indiana; United States
- Broadcast area: Indianapolis metropolitan area
- Frequency: 106.7 MHz
- Branding: 106.7 WTLC

Programming
- Format: Urban adult contemporary

Ownership
- Owner: Urban One; (Radio One of Indiana, LLC)
- Sister stations: WFNI; WHHH; WIBC; WLHK; WTLC; WYXB

History
- First air date: 1968; 57 years ago
- Former call signs: WVYJ (1991); WGGR (1991–1998); WBKS (1998–2001)
- Call sign meaning: "With Tender Loving Care"

Technical information
- Licensing authority: FCC
- Facility ID: 25071
- Class: A
- ERP: 6,000 watts
- HAAT: 99 meters (325 ft)

Links
- Public license information: Public file; LMS
- Webcast: Listen live
- Website: wtlcfm.com

WTLC-FM (106.7 MHz) is an urban adult contemporary radio station licensed to Greenwood, Indiana, serving the Indianapolis metropolitan area. Alongside sister stations WTLC, WHHH, WFNI, WIBC, WLHK, WYXB, and TV station WDNI-CD, WTLC-FM is owned and operated by Radio One. All four stations and TV outlet share studios on Meridian Street in downtown Indianapolis and its transmitter tower is on the city's south side.

It is home to the Rickey Smiley Morning Show.

WTLC-FM is licensed to broadcast in the HD Radio format, but is not currently broadcasting in HD.

== History ==
WTLC-FM (With Tender Loving Care) had formerly aired on 105.7 FM under various monikers such as Soul Stereo FM 105 WTLC, WTLC 105 FM, Fresh 105 WTLC, Power 105 WTLC, 105.7 The People's Station, 105.7 The Power, Power 105.7 FM, and 105.7 WTLC, before the intellectual rights to the format - but not the frequency - were purchased from Emmis Communications by Radio One in January 2001. (See the WYXB page for WTLC's history at 105.7 before 2001.)

Prior to 2001, 106.7 FM operated under the call letters WBKS as an urban oldies station branded as "Kiss 106.7". The 106.7 facility formerly held the call letters WVYJ and WGGR.
