= WXLW =

Radio station in Indianapolis

Coordinates: 39°51′05″N 86°14′40″W

Simulcasting WFDM-FM Franklin
- Indianapolis, Indiana; United States
- Broadcast area: Indianapolis metropolitan area
- Frequency: 950 kHz
- Branding: Freedom 95

Programming
- Format: Conservative talk
- Affiliations: Townhall News

Ownership
- Owner: Pilgrim Communications LLC
- Sister stations: WFDM-FM

History
- First air date: August 18, 1948
- Former frequencies: 1590 kHz (1948–1955)

Technical information
- Licensing authority: FCC
- Facility ID: 60206
- Class: D
- Power: 1,000 watts (day); 13 watts (night)

Links
- Public license information: Public file; LMS
- Webcast: Listen live
- Website: freedom95.us

WXLW (950 AM) is a commercial radio station licensed to Indianapolis, Indiana, United States. Owned by Pilgrim Communications LLC, the station jointly simulcasts a conservative talk format with WFDM-FM as "Freedom 95." The studios are on Industrial Drive off U.S. Route 31 in Franklin, Indiana.

The transmitter is off West 56th Street near Georgetown Road on the northwest side of Indianapolis.

== History ==
=== Early years ===
On August 18, 1948, WXLW first signed on. It was originally on 1590 kHz, and was powered at 1,000 watts. It used a non-directional single tower at its studio location on Kessler Blvd. at West 30th Street in Indianapolis. The station was a daytimer until 1986, required to sign off the air at sunset.

Sister station WXLW-FM began broadcasting a few days after the AM station, August 27, 1948. It broadcast on 94.7 MHz, now WFBQ. WXLW-FM was a simulcast of the AM station's programs but continued to broadcast after sunset when the AM station had to be off the air. Both stations were owned by Radio Indianapolis, Incorporated. In January 1955, WXLW moved to its current dial position at 950 kHz with an increase in power to 5,000 watts, using a directional antenna with a three-tower array. WXLW-AM-FM's format was middle of the road (MOR) with local news updates. The disc jockeys included Howard Dorsey, Greg Smith, Art Roberts and Bob Morrison. WXLW also held an annual Watermelon Festival which featured musical acts like singing duo Homer and Jethro. In the 1960s, the station featured a mobile studio, "The Traveler", that visited locations in Central Indiana promoting events for clients.

=== Top 40 ===
Bill Shirk of Muncie, Indiana, owned WXLW in the 1970s through most of the 1980s. In the early to mid-1970s, the station programmed a high-energy Top 40 hit music format and the station was known as "Super XL". One contest involved giving away Indiana Pacers basketballs, with the slogan "WXLW has balls!" In the mid-1970s Super XL had a higher market share than other full-time AM stations like WIFE (1310) and WNDE (1260).

By 1976, the station changed to adult contemporary music with DJs including Joe Pickett, K.C. Jones, and Lou Sherman. Steve Miller was program director through most of the period (1974–79). For a brief time in 1979, WXLW tried a Sunday-only disco music format called "Space Station Shirk", which was hosted by Mark Edwards and Steve Miller. In 1986, the Federal Communications Commission granted it limited-power nighttime operations. From the late 1990s until 2002, WXLW switched to a Christian radio format.

=== Sports radio ===
On July 8, 2002, shortly after 1260 WNDE switched from ESPN Radio to Fox Sports Radio, WXLW picked up the ESPN network affiliation and became a sports radio station. WXLW aired ESPN programming for six years. In the fall of 2006, the studios were moved from Monument Circle in downtown Indianapolis to a location on Industrial Road off U.S. Route 31 in Franklin.

On January 7, 2008, ESPN Radio changed its Indianapolis affiliation from WXLW to newly created Emmis Communications sports station WFNI 1070 AM. With the loss of ESPN programming, WXLW became a Sporting News Radio affiliate and re-branded as "XL 950". In August 2011, WXLW briefly became part of the Yahoo! Sports Radio network. Notable past hosts on WXLW include Greg Rakestraw, now part of the Indianapolis Colts Radio Network and voice of the Indy Eleven, sportswriter Will Carroll, longtime Indiana Basketball Hall of Fame Executive Director Chris May, and Derek Schultz, who later hosted afternoons on former rival sports station WNDE after his departure in 2011.

=== Freedom 95 ===
On September 10, 2012, WXLW changed its format to talk radio, simulcasting sister station WFDM-FM 95.9 MHz. Because both stations are found at 95 on their respective dials (950 AM and 95.9 FM), they are branded as "Freedom 95".
