= Indianapolis Monthly =

Monthly lifestyle magazine in Indianapolis, Indiana, US

- August 2022 cover of Indianapolis Monthly
- Editor-in-chief: Andrea Ratcliff
- Categories: Lifestyle magazine
- Frequency: Monthly
- Publisher: Ivy Bayer
- Paid circulation: 41,000
- Founder: John and Sally Mayhill; Jim and Nancy Cottrell
- Founded: 1977
- First issue: September 1, 1977; 48 years ago
- Company: Hour Media Group LLC
- Country: United States
- Based in: Indianapolis, Indiana
- Language: English
- Website: www.indianapolismonthly.com
- ISSN: 0899-0328
- OCLC: 8348365

Indianapolis Monthly is a lifestyle magazine published in Indianapolis, Indiana, U.S. The magazine has some special publications and projects including Indiana Bride, Home, The Ticket, and Indiana Travel Guide.

== History ==
Founded in 1977, the magazine was called Indianapolis Home and Garden, changing its name in 1980 to Indianapolis at Home. In 1981, Mayhill Publications, owner and publisher, Robert Thomas Mayhill, took ownership of the magazine, revising its name again to Indianapolis Monthly and naming Deborah Paul editor-in-chief. Indianapolis-based Emmis Communications purchased the magazine in 1988.

In 2014, Indianapolis Monthly was the recipient of the City and Regional Magazine Association's General Excellence II award.

Emmis sold the magazine to Michigan-based Hour Media Group on December 1, 2022.

== See also ==
- Media in Indianapolis
