= WEDJ =

- Danville, Indiana; United States
- Broadcast area: Indianapolis metropolitan area
- Frequency: 107.1 (MHz)
- Branding: Radio Latina 107.1

Programming
- Format: Regional Mexican

Ownership
- Owner: Continental Broadcast Group, LLC
- Sister stations: WNTS, WSYW

History
- First air date: January 10, 1975
- Former call signs: WGRT (1975–1984); WATI (1984–1987); WGRT-FM (1987-?); WSYW-FM (?-1999)
- Call sign meaning: variation of "Edge," for former rock format

Technical information
- Licensing authority: FCC
- Facility ID: 13794
- Class: A
- ERP: 1,800 watts
- HAAT: 184 meters (604 ft)
- Transmitter coordinates: 39.802°N 86.573°W

Links
- Public license information: Public file; LMS
- Webcast: Listen Live
- Website: wedjfm.com

WEDJ (107.1 FM) is a commercial radio station licensed to Danville, Indiana, and serving the Indianapolis metropolitan area. It broadcasts a Regional Mexican radio format and is owned by the Continental Broadcast Group, LLC. The studios and offices are located at 1800 North Meridian Street in Indianapolis. It calls itself "Radio Latina."

WEDJ has an effective radiated power of 1,800 watts. Its transmitter is on Indiana State Road 236, northwest of Danville in Hendricks County.

== History ==
The station began as WGRT on January 10, 1975. Gordon Graham, Steve Miller, and Steve Ross first owners. Steve Miller was first General Manager and Steve Ross first Program Director. Big Mark Edwards and Rick Allan were first part-timers. The call letters were changed to WATI in 1984, then were changed to WGRT-FM in September 1987, and once again to WSYW-FM in the late 80s.

As WSYW-FM, the station programmed classical music as 107.1 "Symphony 107". WSYW 107.1 and sister station AM 810 WSYW simulcast until the AM station switched to Children's Radio as a Radio AAHS network affiliate.

Classical programming was dropped in the mid-90s in favor of Smooth jazz as "Silk 107.1" programming was provided by Jones Radio Network's Smooth Jazz 24/7 format. Also, around this time, WSYW-FM was leasing out various hours throughout the day to Spanish-language broadcasters, providing the first on-air outlet in Indianapolis for Hispanic programming. This continued until October 1999, when the station changed format to Active rock as WEDJ.

WEDJ, known on-air as 107.1 The Edge, went on the air in mid-October 1999. However, after only a week using the branding, the station's name was changed to Rock 107 due to copyright issues with "The Edge" name. The format provided an alternative to rival rock station X 103. But with WEDJ's transmitter 20 miles from Indianapolis, signal issues in part of the market made it difficult to compete.

In late 2000, the time on WEDJ was brokered to two companies providing the station with two different Spanish-language formats. WEDJ became the first FM station and the second full-time station programming to Latinos in Indianapolis, preceded only by sister AM station, WSYW 810. Once the contracts expired, WEDJ began running its own Hispanic programming, first as "La Ley," then as "Radio Latina". The station under both names aired a Spanish CHR format. In late 2006, Radio Latina was revamped and flipped format to Regional Mexican programming.
