= WYXB =

Radio station in Indianapolis

- Indianapolis, Indiana; United States
- Broadcast area: Indianapolis metropolitan area
- Frequency: 105.7 MHz
- Branding: B105.7

Programming
- Format: Adult contemporary

Ownership
- Owner: Urban One; (Radio One of Indiana, LLC)
- Sister stations: WFNI, WIBC, WLHK, WTLC, WTLC-FM, WDNI-CD

History
- First air date: May 13, 1961
- Former call signs: WAIV (1961–1968); WTLC (1968–2001)

Technical information
- Licensing authority: FCC
- Facility ID: 51432
- Class: B
- ERP: 50,000 watts
- HAAT: 150 meters (490 ft)
- Transmitter coordinates: 39°46′3.00″N 86°0′12.00″W

Links
- Public license information: Public file; LMS
- Webcast: Listen live; Listen live (via iHeartRadio)
- Website: b1057.com

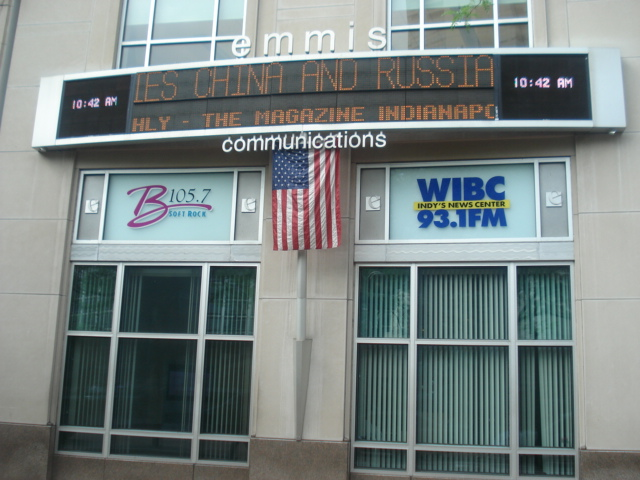
Offices of WYXB

WYXB (105.7 FM), branded as "B105.7", is a commercial radio station licensed to Indianapolis, Indiana, United States, serving the Indianapolis metropolitan area. Owned by Urban One, it features an adult contemporary format as "B105.7". The studios are on Monument Circle in downtown Indianapolis.

The transmitter is on Burk Road near South Post Road on the eastside of Indianapolis.

== History ==
=== Classical WAIV ===
The station signed on the air on May 13, 1961. Its original call sign was WAIV, a classical music station. It was owned by Calojay Enterprises and was a rare stand-alone FM station, not co-owned with an AM or TV station. The studios were at 3208 East Michigan Street. In 1964, the station relocated to the Dearborn Hotel on East Michigan Street. (The Dearborn is now home to the Wheeler Mission Community Center.)

By 1967, WAIV ran out of advertising dollars. The founders formed "The Fine Arts Society of Indianapolis" in 1968 to keep classical music on the radio but no longer dependent on advertising dollars. The group put WICR 88.7 FM on the air as a listener-supported classical and jazz outlet.

=== Urban WTLC ===
The call letters on 105.7 FM changed to WTLC on January 22, 1968, and flipped to an urban contemporary format. Throughout the years, WTLC utilized several on-air brandings, including Soul Stereo FM 105 WTLC, WTLC FM 105, Fresh 105 WTLC, Power 105 WTLC, 105.7 The People's Station, 105.7 The Power, Power 105.7 FM, and 105.7 WTLC.

In 1997, Emmis Communications bought both WTLC-FM and its AM sister station, WTLC 1310 AM. In February 2001, Emmis sold the intellectual rights to the programming on WTLC-FM and AM, while the actual station license stayed in the Emmis fold. WTLC-FM and its urban format moved up the dial to 106.7 FM on February 15.

=== AC WYXB ===
Emmis changed the call letters of 105.7 FM to WYXB, rebranding it as "B 105.7". The station switched to adult contemporary, playing the softer hits of the 1980s, 90s and current AC music.

On June 13, 2022, Emmis announced it would sell its entire cluster of radio stations in Indianapolis to Urban One. The sale, at a price of $25 million, was consummated on August 31, 2022.

== Programming ==
WYXB broadcasts a gold-based adult contemporary music format. WYXB's playlist spans from the 1980s to the present. Its original positioning statement of "Soft Rock for a Busy World" was later shortened to just "Soft Rock." It has since changed its slogan to "The BEST variety of the 80s, 90s, & TODAY".

WYXB DJs Bernie Eagan and Eric Garnes are Indy radio veterans. Studios for Urban One stations in Indianapolis, WLHK, WIBC, WFNI, WTLC, WTLC-FM and WYXB are on the southwest quadrant of Monument Circle.
