= Indianapolis Business Journal =

Weekly newspaper from Indianapolis, Indiana

- Type: Weekly newspaper
- Owner(s): IBJ Media Corporation
- Publisher: Nathan J. Feltman
- Editor: Lesley Weidenbener
- Founded: 1980; 45 years ago
- Headquarters: Indianapolis, Indiana, U.S.
- ISSN: 0274-4929
- Website: ibj.com

Indianapolis Business Journal, often abbreviated IBJ, is a weekly newspaper published in Indianapolis, Indiana, U.S. IBJ reports on Central Indiana business. It is the leading publication of IBJ Media. Its economic columnists include Morton Marcus and Michael J. Hicks.

== History ==
The newspaper was founded in 1980 by Mark Vittert and John W. Burkhart. It was bought by American City Business Journals in 1986 and then sold two years later to Metro Collegiate Publications. In 1990, it was purchased by Mickey Maurer and Bob Schloss. Nate Feltman, Indiana's secretary of commerce from 2006 to 2008, acquired a one-third stake in IBJ Media in 2017. He increased his ownership to 50% in 2020 and became the sole owner in 2024.

== See also ==
- Media in Indianapolis
