= WNTS =

- Beech Grove, Indiana; United States
- Broadcast area: Indianapolis metropolitan area
- Frequency: 1590 kHz
- Branding: La Pantera 103.9

Programming
- Format: Classic Regional Mexican

Ownership
- Owner: Marvin B. Kosofosky; (Continental Broadcast Group, L.L.C.)
- Sister stations: WEDJ, WSYW

History
- First air date: December 19, 1956
- Former call signs: WGEE (1956–1974)
- Call sign meaning: Former News Talk Sports format

Technical information
- Licensing authority: FCC
- Facility ID: 58320
- Class: B
- Power: 5,000 watts (day); 500 watts (night)
- Transmitter coordinates: 39°44′21″N 86°5′26″W
- Translator: 103.9 W280FR (Beech Grove)

Links
- Public license information: Public file; LMS
- Webcast: Listen live
- Website: lapantera1039.com

WNTS (1590 AM) is a commercial radio station licensed to Beech Grove, Indiana, United States, and serving the Indianapolis metropolitan area. It broadcasts a Classic Regional Mexican format and is owned by Marvin Kosofosky's Continental Broadcast Group, L.L.C. The studios and transmitter are located at 4800 East Raymond Street near Sloan Avenue on the southeast side of Indianapolis.

== History ==
On December 19, 1956, the station signed on as WGEE. It was a daytimer, required to go off the air at sunset. Most of the station's programming was aimed at the African American community of Indianapolis. Much of the remainder of the station's programming was devoted to country music.

On May 15, 1964, WGEE launched sister station WGEE-FM (now WOLT). During the early years, the two stations simulcast, with WGEE-FM continuing the programming after sunset, when WGEE AM had to be off the air. WGEE-AM-FM aired a format known as the "WG Parade Of Hits". Bob Todd was Program Director with disc jockeys Scott Evans, George L. Davis, Mike O'Brien, Scott Wheeler, Jim Fox, Ron Hoffer, and Steve Miller. Dick Shane was News Director.

WIRE owner Mid America Radio acquired WGEE-FM in March 1972. The FM adopted a beautiful music format with call letters WXTZ. On May 7, 1972, WGEE was acquired by B & G Broadcasting. The station became WNIR "The Country Winner" with a country format programmed by Bob Todd, with Buddy O'Shay as morning DJ.

On April 15, 1974, WNIR was acquired by S & M Broadcasting, and became "News Talk Sports 16." The new call letters reflected the format: WNTS for News, Talk, Sports. Sam Smulyan was president of the new company. His son Jeff (later President and CEO of Indianapolis-based Emmis Communications) was appointed General Manager. Operations were handled by Rick Cummings.

Other employees after the change to news and talk included a Broad Ripple High School and Ball State University graduate named David Letterman, who later went on to become the host of late night comedy shows on NBC and CBS. In early 1976, WNTS switched to all news radio, using national news programming from NBC's News and Information Service (NIS). NIS only lasted two years before NBC decided to cancel the service. Warren Fooks and James Buckland were engineers during David Letterman tenure with the station.

WNTS changed to Christian radio on January 18, 1977. That was coupled with permission from the Federal Communications Commission to broadcast at night. To do so, the city of license for WNTS was changed from Indianapolis to Beech Grove. An additional tower was also added at the station's transmitter site. DJ's included Bill Butler, Steven Dallas Cale, Debbie Tenney, and James Buckland. Operations manager at that time was Jack Marsela. Jeff Smulyan was the General Manager.

After changing to religious programming, WNTS aired a schedule of Contemporary Christian music with some Christian talk and teaching shows. Around 1990, it changed format to Southern Gospel music and talk. The station was managed by Jim Wilson. DJ's included Larry Dean, Diane Benson, Kevin Wilson, Chris Moore, Nancy Marie, and Tom Elliott. One program was the 4-hour all-request music program "Country Gospel Store", started by Jim Wilson's wife, Nancy Marie. After Nancy Marie's death, the Country Gospel Store continued with host Kevin Wilson.

In 2003, Daniel Ott started an alternative rock format on the station, known as "The Edge." It continued through 2005. In 2013, the station was operated under a local marketing agreement by Continental Broadcast Group, and the format was changed to Regional Mexican the first time, known as Exitos 1590.

On October 28, 2019, WNTS changed its format to Classic Regional Mexican, branded as "La Pantera 1590", swapping formats with co-owned WSYW (810 AM).
