= KWIK =

Radio station in Pocatello, Idaho

- Pocatello, Idaho; United States
- Broadcast area: Pocatello, Idaho
- Frequency: 1240 kHz
- Branding: KID Newsradio

Programming
- Format: News/talk
- Affiliations: Fox News Radio; Compass Media Networks; Premiere Networks

Ownership
- Owner: Rich Broadcasting; (Rich Broadcasting Idaho LS, LLC)

History
- First air date: 1946
- Former call signs: KCLJ (CP); KEYY (1946–1952); KJRL (1952–1954)

Technical information
- Licensing authority: FCC
- Facility ID: 35885
- Class: C
- Power: 960 watts
- Transmitter coordinates: 42°55′27″N 112°27′31″W
- Translator: 95.3 K237FA (Pocatello)

Links
- Public license information: Public file; LMS
- Webcast: Listen live
- Website: www.kidnewsradio.com

KWIK (1240 AM) is a radio station broadcasting a news/talk format serving the Pocatello, Idaho, United States, area. The station is currently owned by Rich Broadcasting and licensed to Rich Broadcasting Idaho LS, LLC. The station features programming from Fox News Radio, Compass Media Networks, and Premiere Networks.

== Ownership ==
In October 2007, a deal was reached for KWIK to be acquired by GAP Broadcasting II LLC (Samuel Weller, president) from Clear Channel Communications as part of a 57 station deal with a total reported sale price of $74.78 million. What eventually became GapWest Broadcasting was folded into Townsquare Media on August 13, 2010; Townsquare, in turn, sold its Idaho Falls–Pocatello stations to Rich Broadcasting in 2011.
