= WBRI =

Radio stations in Indianapolis

Indianapolis, Indiana; United States
- Broadcast area: Indianapolis metropolitan area
- Frequency: 1500 kHz
- Branding: Grace Talk 1500 / Grace Talk 96.7

Programming
- Format: Christian radio

Ownership
- Owner: Wilkins Radio Network, Inc.; (Heritage Christian Radio, Inc.)

History
- First air date: March 12, 1964
- Former call signs: WNDY (1961–1964)
- Call sign meaning: Bible Radio for Indiana

Technical information
- Licensing authority: FCC
- Facility ID: 54706
- Class: D
- Power: 5,000 watts (days only)
- Transmitter coordinates: 39°52′14″N 86°05′17″W
- Translator: 96.7 W244DN (Indianapolis)

Links
- Public license information: Public file; LMS
- Webcast: WBRI 1500 Listen live WBRI 96.7 Listen live
- Website: WBRI 1500 Online; WBRI 96.7 Online

WBRI (1500 AM) is a commercial radio station licensed to Indianapolis, Indiana, serving the Indianapolis metropolitan area. Owned by the Wilkins Radio Network, Inc. via Heritage Christian Radio, Inc, the station broadcasts a Christian radio format, operating during the daytime hours only. WBRI is one of the oldest Christian talk stations in the United States, starting the format in 1964.

The transmitter is on Adams Boulevard Drive near East 62nd Street. Programming is heard around the clock on 250 watt FM translator W244DN at 96.7 MHz.

== History ==
On March 12, 1964, the station signed on the air. The original call sign was WNDY. In 1964, the station changed its call letters to WBRI and its format to Christian radio.

In 2003, WBRI was sold to Heritage Christian Radio, Inc., a subsidiary of Wilkins Radio Network, Inc. The price tag was $1.5 million. Wilkins continued the Christian programming, using shows from its own network.

Former logo
