= WIBC (FM) =

News/talk radio station in Indianapolis

- Indianapolis, Indiana; United States
- Broadcast area: Indianapolis metropolitan area
- Frequency: 93.1 MHz (HD Radio)
- Branding: 93 WIBC

Programming
- Language: English
- Format: Talk radio
- Subchannels: HD2: 93.5/107.5 The Fan (Sports); HD3: Same as HD2
- Affiliations: Fox News Radio; Premiere Networks; Radio America; WISH-TV

Ownership
- Owner: Urban One; (Radio One of Indiana, LLC)
- Sister stations: WHHH; WLHK; WTLC; WTLC-FM; WYXB; WDNI-CD

History
- First air date: December 5, 1960
- Former call signs: WIBC-FM (1960–1968); WNAP (1968–1986); WEAG (1986–1987); WKLR (1987–1994); WNAP-FM (1994–2000); WNOU (2000–2007); WEXM (2007)
- Call sign meaning: Indianapolis Broadcasting Company

Technical information
- Licensing authority: FCC
- Facility ID: 19524
- Class: B
- ERP: 13,500 watts
- HAAT: 302 meters (991 ft)
- Transmitter coordinates: 39.7675°N 86.0033°W
- Translators: HD2: 93.5 W228CX (Indianapolis); HD2: 107.5 W298BB (Indianapolis)

Links
- Public license information: Public file; LMS
- Webcast: Listen live; HD2: Listen live
- Website: www.wibc.com; HD2: Listen live

WIBC (93.1 MHz) is a commercial FM radio station in Indianapolis, Indiana. It is owned by Urban One and broadcasts a news/talk format. The studios are located at 40 Monument Circle in downtown Indianapolis. The transmitter and antenna are located near South Post Road and Burk Road on the far east side of Indianapolis. The station airs mostly local conservative talk shows on weekdays, with several nationally syndicated programs, including Dana Loesch, Tony Kinnett of The Daily Signal, Chad Benson, Coast to Coast AM with George Noory and on weekends Kim Komando. Weekends also feature shows on money, health, gardening, computers and guns. Some weekend hours are paid brokered programming. Some hours begin with world and national news from Fox News Radio.

For nearly seven decades, WIBC broadcast on the AM radio frequency of 1070 kHz. On December 26, 2007, WIBC's call letters and talk programming moved to the FM dial at co-owned 93.1 MHz, which had always been WIBC's FM sister station and previously operated as WIBC-FM from 1960 to 1968. Also on that date, the 1070 kHz frequency took the call sign WFNI and began an all-sports format as "1070 The Fan".

WIBC broadcasts in HD, using its HD2 signal for WFNI's local sports format, also heard on translators 93.5 W228CX and 107.5 W298BB. WIBC's HD3 signal carries a simulcast of WIBC's HD2 signal.

== History ==
=== Early years and heyday as WNAP ===
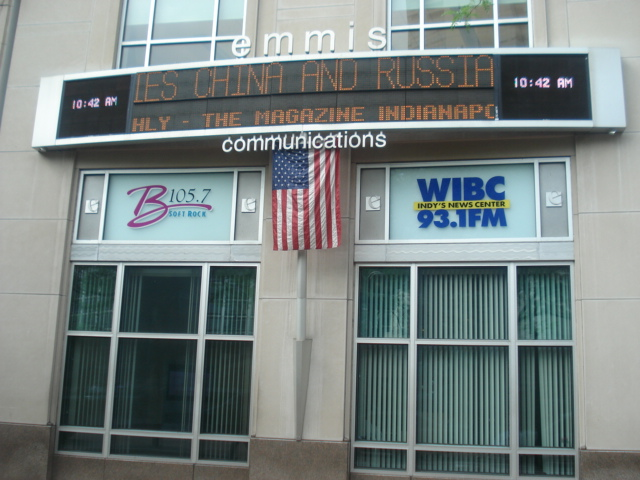
Offices of WIBC

WIBC-FM first signed on December 5, 1960, operating on 93.1 FM in Indianapolis. It aired an automated classical music format.

On July 22, 1968, the station was re-launched as WNAP. It was the first FM station in the Indianapolis market to broadcast a hybrid formatted mix of both AOR and Top 40 hits, better known as "Rock 40" an ancestor of the CHR format, and was in direct competition with Top 40 leader WIFE. In 1970, WNAP began broadcasting in stereo. According to the documentary film Naptown Rock Radio Wars, station and program managers from across the United States came to Indianapolis to listen to WNAP in order to figure out the unique style of "The Buzzard" so they could emulate its success at their own stations such as WVBF in Boston and WMMS in Cleveland. The classic top of the hour station identification from this era featured the sound of two thunderbolts and the distinctive voice of WIBC's Chuck Riley, brother of WNAP's DJ Michael D. "Buster Bodine" Hanks, intoning the phrase, "The wrath of The Buzzard! WNAP, Indianapolis". Later in the 1970s and early 1980s, the station was rebranded as "WNAP Stereo 93 FM, The Buzzard".

=== Demise of "The Buzzard" ===
On April 4, 1986, suffering from a fall in ratings due to competition from WFBQ, the format of 93.1 was changed to a rock-driven hot adult contemporary format, and the call letters became WEAG with branding as "Eagle 93". The format was later changed to classic hits with the call letters WKLR on August 14, 1987. On April 1, 1988, WKLR changed from classic hits to oldies.

WNAP returned at 5:00 p.m. on September 9, 1994, when WKLR was changed back to a classic hits station with a strong focus on the "greatest hits of the 70s". The station failed with this programming direction and soon refocused around more standard classic rock, along with carriage of The Howard Stern Show in the mornings. Unlike most markets though, WFBQ's local and dominant Bob and Tom Show easily won in the ratings, and like most stations outside Stern's Northeast base, had wholly incompatible audience flow for the rest of the broadcast day. The station continued to limp into the new millennium without any momentum outside Stern's show and Emmis management being more focused on burnishing its AM sister station and talk format.

=== Radio Now 93.1 ===
After weeks of stunting, WNAP changed to contemporary hits on March 28, 2000, at 6:00 a.m., with new call letters WNOU and the name "Radio Now". Radio Now's first song was "The Rockafeller Skank" by Fatboy Slim. "Radio Now" debuted as a new type of CHR station with a very small playlist and featured the top hits of the day at the top of every hour. The station received some national notice in November 2004, when its morning show conducted the first interview with Indiana Pacers player Ron Artest following the Pacers–Pistons brawl.

==== Orbital 93.1 ====
In 2006, WNOU launched an HD2 subchannel, dubbed "Orbital 93.1", which offered a rhythmic contemporary format with emphasis on current and classic dance music. On October 9, 2007, Orbital was discontinued, being replaced with the Radio NOW format for one day after the format ended on 93.1, and before it moved to 100.9, serving as a buffer for the format.

=== WIBC moves to FM ===
On October 8, 2007, at noon, after playing "When You're Gone" by Avril Lavigne, 93.1 began stunting with Christmas music under the placeholder callsign of WEXM, being promoted as "The 93 Days of Christmas". The Christmas format was a place holder as part of the transition to moving the talk programming of WIBC from 1070 AM to 93.1 FM. Initially planned, as the branding implied, to last 93 days from October 8 to January 8, the change-over was moved up to December 26. The switch came after Emmis acquired local radio rights to the Indianapolis Colts football team. To prevent frequent preemption of programming and tedious shufflings of games on its stations, it was decided to move WIBC to the FM frequency immediately after Christmas, and make 1070 AM a sports station as "AM 1070 The Fan", with its call sign changing to WFNI. This allowed Emmis to continue branding as WIBC alone despite the move to FM, with no "-FM" suffix required for disambiguation due to 1070 AM's re-call to WFNI.

Upon the demise of "Radio Now", Radio One (now Urban One) purchased the intellectual property of the station from Emmis Communications. Two days later, on October 10, the "Radio Now" branding, format and logo were installed on the new 100.9 WNOU (formerly WYJZ, now WHHH). Local Radio One management said that they would offer the displaced staffers of WNOU the first chance of joining the new station's lineup, and would use the same imaging as the former WNOU at 93.1. Emmis also stated that they would release displaced Radio Now staffers from their "non-compete" contracts.

On June 13, 2022, Emmis announced that it would sell its Indianapolis stations to Urban One. The sale, at a price of $25 million, was consummated on August 31, 2022.
