= WSYW =

Indianapolis, Indiana; United States
- Broadcast area: Indianapolis metropolitan area
- Frequency: 810 kHz
- Branding: Exitos 94.3

Programming
- Language: Spanish
- Format: Adult contemporary
- Affiliations: Premiere Networks; Indy Eleven

Ownership
- Owner: Continental Broadcast Group, LLC
- Sister stations: WEDJ, WNTS

History
- First air date: May 15, 1963
- Former call signs: WIGO (1963–1966); WATI (1966–1984); WGRT (1984–1990)

Technical information
- Licensing authority: FCC
- Facility ID: 13795
- Class: D
- Power: 250 watts (day)
- Transmitter coordinates: 39°43′32″N 86°11′8″W
- Translator: 94.3 W232DM (Indianapolis)

Links
- Public license information: Public file; LMS
- Webcast: Listen live
- Website: exitos943.com

WSYW (810 AM) is a commercial radio station licensed to Indianapolis, Indiana. It broadcasts a Spanish language adult contemporary format, branded as "Exitos 94.3". The station is owned by Continental Broadcast Group, LLC.

WSYW only operates during the daytime hours, but programming is heard around the clock on 250 watt FM translator W232DM at 94.3 MHz.

== History ==
On May 15, 1963, the station signed on as WIGO. Luke Walton was owner and general manager with George L. Davis as one of the disc jockeys. Studios were in the basement level of office building at 143 Delaware St.

In 1966, station was sold to Sarkes Tarzian, who changed the format to a home grown easy listening format and the new call sign WATI.

It was sold to Continental Broadcast Group, LLC, with the call letters changed to WGRT on December 14, 1984. On February 15, 1990, the station changed its call sign to the current WSYW.

Previous formats include hip-hop music known as "Yo! 8-1-0," children's music known as Radio AAHS Network on February 1, 1995, and classical music as a simulcast of 107.1 (now WEDJ). Another children's show, MY FIRST RADIO, aired for less than a year. It ran from 7:30 to 8:30am weekdays and was produced by Stuart Lowry and Jim Walsh (of WITT).

On October 28, 2019, WSYW changed its format to Spanish language Adult Contemporary, branded as "Exitos 94.3," simulcast on FM translator W232DM (94.3 FM), as part of a format swap with sister station WNTS (1590 AM).
