= WFDM-FM =

Coordinates: 39.514°N 86.069°W

- Franklin, Indiana; United States
- Broadcast area: Indianapolis metropolitan area
- Frequency: 95.9 MHz
- Branding: Freedom 95

Programming
- Format: Talk (WXLW simulcast)
- Network: Townhall News
- Affiliations: Premiere Networks; Westwood One; Compass Media Networks

Ownership
- Owner: Pilgrim Communications LLC
- Sister stations: WXLW

History
- First air date: December 15, 1961; 64 years ago
- Call sign meaning: W FreeDoM

Technical information
- Licensing authority: FCC
- Facility ID: 21842
- Class: A
- ERP: 3,400 watts
- HAAT: 91 meters (299 ft)

Links
- Public license information: Public file; LMS
- Webcast: Listen Live
- Website: freedom95.us

WFDM-FM (95.9 MHz, "Freedom 95") is a commercial radio station licensed to Franklin, Indiana, and serving the greater Indianapolis metropolitan area. The station is owned by Pilgrim Communications LLC and airs a conservative talk radio format. It is simulcast with co-owned AM 950 WXLW.

The studios and offices are on Industrial Drive in Franklin, Indiana. The transmitter is co-located with the studios, near U.S. Route 31. WFDM-FM is a Class A FM station with an effective radiated power (ERP) of 3,400 watts. By contrast, some Indianapolis stations are powered at 50,000 watts.

== Programming ==
WFDM-FM and WXLW have one local show, with morning host Todd Huff. The rest of the weekday schedule is made up of nationally syndicated talk shows, including Dave Ramsey, Glenn Beck, Sean Hannity, Mark Levin, Joe Pags, "Our American Stories with Lee Habeeb" and "This Morning, America's First News with Gordon Deal." Most hours begin with an update from Townhall News.

== History ==
The station signed on the air on December 15, 1961, as WIFN with a middle of the road (MOR) format. It was owned by Howell B. Phillips and was powered at only 790 watts. In 1970, the station was acquired by William R. Vogel and Ronald Douglas. The partners continued the MOR format and boosted the power to 3,000 watts.

In 2000, it became "95.9 the Point," airing mainly conservative talk programming. On July 1, 2003, the station flipped formats to Contemporary Christian Music (CCM) and became WIJY, "Joy 96," after another Indianapolis-area station that had aired CCM music, 98.3 WXIR, switched to "Radio Disney" as WRDZ-FM.

On September 21, 2005, it flipped again, this time to Oldies as WIAU "Gold 95.9." It used the ABC "Pure Gold" format and the same image campaign previously used on "Gold 104.5" WGLD in Indianapolis, which had just flipped to adult hits "Jack FM" WJJK.

On Monday, November 12, 2007, the station dropped the Oldies format, and WFDM-FM "Freedom 95.9" began. It carried virtually the same weekday lineup that had previously been heard on Indianapolis-area station 93.9 WWFT (now WNDX). Beginning in September 2012, Pilgrim Communications began simulcasting WFDM-FM's talk programming on AM 950 WXLW, broadening the station's coverage area, including communities north of Indianapolis that have trouble receiving the FM signal.
