= WSVX =

Coordinates: 39°33′29″N 85°46′13″W

- Shelbyville, Indiana; United States
- Broadcast area: Greenfield, Indiana; Rushville, Indiana
- Frequency: 1520 kHz
- Branding: Giant FM Country

Programming
- Format: Country
- Affiliations: ABC News Radio

Ownership
- Owner: 3 Towers Broadcasting Company, LLC

History
- First air date: January 14, 1961 (as WSVL)
- Former call signs: WSVL (1961-1990); WOOO (1990–2000); WKWH (2000–2007)
- Call sign meaning: ShelbyVille

Technical information
- Licensing authority: FCC
- Facility ID: 2872
- Class: D
- Power: 260 watts day 4 watts night
- Translators: 96.5 W243CL (Shelbyville); 106.3 W292FH (Shelbyville)

Links
- Public license information: Public file; LMS
- Website: giant.fm

WSVX 1520 AM is a radio station licensed to Shelbyville, Indiana. The station broadcasts a country music format and is owned by 3 Towers Broadcasting Company, LLC. WSVX is also heard on 96.5 FM and through a translator in Shelbyville, Indiana and 106.3 FM through a translator in Hancock County, Indiana.

== History ==
The station began broadcasting January 14, 1961, and originally held the call sign WSVL. The station was originally licensed to run 250 watts, 24 hours a day, using a directional array. In 1963, the station's daytime power was increased to 1,000 watts.

In 1990, the station's call sign was changed to WOOO. WOOO aired a country music format in the early 1990s. By 1996, the station had begun airing an oldies format. In 2000, the station's call sign was changed to WKWH. The station continued to air an oldies format, with the branding "Power Oldies". By 2004, the station's format had shifted to classic hits, and the station was branded "Classic Hits 1520". In 2007, the station's call sign was changed to WSVX, and the station began airing a CHR format.

In 2008, 3 Towers Broadcasting Company purchased W243CL 96.5 in Shelbyville for $20,000, and it began rebroadcasting the programming of WSVX. In 2011, the station's daytime power was reduced to 260 watts and the nighttime power was reduced to 4 watts, with omnidirectional daytime and nighttime operation, using a single tower, following the collapse of one of the station's three towers. In 2018, WSVX began to be rebroadcast in Hancock County on 106.3 W292FH.

On November 30, 2020, WSVX changed their format from top 40 (CHR) to country, branded as "Giant FM Country".

== Translators ==
Call sign	Frequency	City of license	FID	ERP (W)	HAAT	Class	FCC info
W243CL	96.5 FM	Shelbyville, Indiana	142111	250	96.4 m (316 ft)	D	LMS
W292FH	106.3 FM	Shelbyville, Indiana	200682	170	100 m (328 ft)	D	LMS
