= WTLC (AM) =

Radio station in Indianapolis, Indiana

Coordinates: 39.7192°N 86.1760°W

- Indianapolis, Indiana; United States
- Broadcast area: Indianapolis metropolitan area
- Frequency: 1310 kHz
- Branding: Praise AM 1310 & 95.1 FM

Programming
- Format: Urban gospel

Ownership
- Owner: Urban One; (Radio One of Indiana, LLC)
- Sister stations: WFNI; WHHH; WIBC; WLHK; WTLC-FM; WYXB

History
- First air date: July 27, 1941; 84 years ago (current license dates from June 1, 1976)
- Former call signs: WISH (1941–1965); WIFE (1965–1983); WMLF (1983–1986); WTUX (1986–1992)
- Call sign meaning: "With Tender Loving Care"

Technical information
- Licensing authority: FCC
- Facility ID: 51433
- Class: B
- Power: 5,000 watts day; 1,000 watts night
- Translator: 95.1 W236CR (Indianapolis)

Links
- Public license information: Public file; LMS
- Webcast: Listen live
- Website: www.praiseindy.com

WTLC (1310 kHz) is a commercial AM radio station in Indianapolis, Indiana. It is owned by Urban One and broadcasts an urban gospel radio format, with some Christian talk and teaching shows heard middays and afternoons. The studios and offices are downtown at the corner of Meridian and St. Joseph Streets.

By day, WTLC transmits 5,000 watts, non-directional. To avoid interference to other stations on 1310 AM frequency, it reduces power at night to 1,000 watts and switches to a directional antenna with a three-tower array that focuses the broadcast signal more to the north-northeast, west-northwest, and east-southeast. The transmitter is on the south side of Indianapolis between Troy and Sumner Avenues near the same block as television station WTTV's former studios. Programming is also heard on a 250-watt FM translator: 95.1 W236CR in Indianapolis.

== History ==
=== WISH ===
On July 27, 1941, the station first signed on the air as WISH. It was put on the air by engineer and pioneer radio broadcaster Russ Salter. The studios were in the Board of Trade Building. WISH was an NBC Blue Network affiliate, airing its dramas, comedies, news, and sports during the "Golden Age of Radio". The Blue Network later became ABC Radio. In 1947, principal owner C. Bruce McConnell sold WISH to Frank H. McKinney and associates for a "price of approximately $500,000".

In 1954, the owners of WISH radio also started WISH-TV on channel 8 in Indianapolis. WISH added an FM station in 1961, 105.7 WAIV (now WYXB). In the 1950s and 1960s, WISH aired a full service, middle of the road (MOR) format of popular adult music, news, and sports, while WAIV played classical music.

=== WIFE ===
In late 1965, WISH and WAIV were sold to STAR Broadcasting, owned by Don W. Burden. STAR changed the call letters to WIFE and WIFE-FM, airing a Top 40 format of contemporary hits, aimed at young adults and teenagers. WIFE-AM-FM was the ratings leader during the mid- and late-sixties, sometime garnering as much of a forty share of the Indianapolis radio audience. The station built this audience for "Lucky 13" by playing the top hits along with heavy and frequent contesting such as, "The 100 Thousand Dollar Dream Home" and "The 100 Thousand Dollar Cash and Car Give-A-Way".

Burden, who was a hands-on owner, hired some major on-air personalities and developed others, dubbed the "WIFE Good Guys". They included Big Jack Armstrong, Roger W. Morgan, Reb Porter, Jay Reynolds (later heard on WABC in New York City), Joe Light, Jay Hawkins, Buddy Scott, Jim Fox, T. J. Byers, Scott Wheeler, Mike O'Brien, Dan Summers, and Steve Miller. The 24-hour news department was the home of noted reporters Lyle Dean, Bob Schuman, Dean Sheppard, and Paul Casey. During these years, the station had a billboard near Indianapolis' Weir Cook Airport (now Indianapolis International Airport) which told passing motorists, "While you're away, we'll be here with your WIFE".

After Burden later ran afoul of the Federal Communications Commission (FCC), Star Stations of Indiana was denied its license renewal application for WIFE in 1976. Burden surrendered WIFE to Indianapolis Broadcasting, a local group that had challenged Burden's ownership of the station seven years earlier. The new owners took control on June 1 under a new license, but retained the Top 40 format. An era of frequent call letter changes (WMLF, WTUX, WTLC) and formats (Music of Your Life, adult standards, and urban oldies) began in 1984 and continued into the 1990s.

=== WTLC ===
In late 1997, then-owner Panache sold the station to Emmis Communications. Emmis switched the format to urban gospel to sell in combination with its urban contemporary station WTLC-FM. For a two-year period, the majority of programming on 1310 AM was syndicated from the Sheridan Broadcasting Gospel service and branded as "The Light".

Former logo

In January 2001, the station was purchased from Emmis by Radio One, now known as Urban One. The affiliation with Sheridan was dropped but the station retained the name "The Light". Syndicated host Erica Campbell is heard in mornings with Christian talk and teaching shows in middays and afternoons, some of which are paid brokered programming. The station returns to urban gospel music evenings and overnights.
