= WFNI =

Sports radio station in Indianapolis

- Indianapolis, Indiana; United States
- Broadcast area: Indianapolis metropolitan area
- Frequency: 1070 kHz

Programming
- Format: Sports
- Affiliations: ESPN Radio

Ownership
- Owner: Emmis Corporation; (Emmis Radio License, LLC)

History
- First air date: October 30, 1938
- Former call signs: WIBC (1938–2007)
- Former frequencies: 1050 kHz (1938–1941)
- Call sign meaning: "Fan Indianapolis"

Technical information
- Licensing authority: FCC
- Facility ID: 19521
- Class: B
- Power: 50,000 watts (day); 10,000 watts night
- Transmitter coordinates: 39°57′21.1″N 86°21′30″W

Links
- Public license information: Public file; LMS

WFNI (1070 AM) is a radio station in Indianapolis, Indiana, United States. It is owned by the Emmis Corporation but is usually off the air. WFNI carried a sports radio format, featuring ESPN Radio programming. The studios and offices are located at 40 Monument Circle in downtown Indianapolis.

WFNI's AM signal, 50,000 watts by day and 10,000 watts at night, went dark at midnight on August 3, 2021. Emmis Broadcasting sold the land on which the six-tower array stood, off Perry Worth Drive near Interstate 65 in Whitestown, Indiana. Emmis says it is looking for a new site for its AM transmitter but none has been found yet. Programming continues to be heard on FM translators at 93.5 and 107.5 MHz in Indianapolis. They are fed by sister station 93.1 WIBC's HD Radio subchannel.

== 1070 AM as WIBC ==
=== Early years ===
The station signed on the air on October 30, 1938. Its original call sign, WIBC, stood for the owner, the Indiana Broadcasting Company. The construction permit had previously held the call letters WGVA, for Glenn Van Auken. He was the company's president. WIBC began as a 1,000-watt daytime-only station. It was sold in 1939 to H. G. Wall.

The station was approved in 1940 to broadcast at night. It moved from 1050 to 1070 kilocycles as part of the enactment of the North American Regional Broadcasting Agreement (NARBA) in 1941. With the move, the daytime power increased to 5,000 watts. Initially independent, the station became a network affiliate of the Mutual Broadcasting System in April 1941.

WIBC was sold in 1944 to the Indianapolis News, making it the first newspaper in Indiana to own a radio station. Four years later, WIBC was separated from the Indianapolis News and sold directly to Charles M. Fairbanks and his associates, who owned the newspaper. In 1950, WIBC got a power boost to 50,000 watts by day and 10,000 watts at night.

Fairbanks attempted to start a television station on Channel 13. However, the Federal Communications Commission ruled in favor of the competing bid of the Cincinnati-based Crosley Broadcasting Corporation, which launched WLWI. Fairbanks sued, arguing that a local owner should be prioritized for the last VHF allocation available in town. Fairbanks prevailed in the initial battle to have the 1957 grant to Crosley overturned, but the FCC set aside the order in 1961. The two parties settled the dispute in 1962 when Crosley sold Fairbanks its Atlanta television station.

In 1960, WIBC added an FM station at 93.1, WIBC-FM, which initially aired an automated classical music format in its early years.

=== Indianapolis 500 ===
Beginning in 1946, WIBC carried the Indianapolis 500 as a Mutual Broadcasting System affiliate, since Mutual had the rights to broadcast the motor race. WIBC establish a broadcasting tradition when the station struck a last-minute deal to provide coverage of the 1952 Indianapolis 500, with Sid Collins as the lead announcer, after Mutual pulled out as the Indianapolis 500 official broadcaster.

The next year, its coverage grew to include personalities from and was simulcast on the other major stations in town: WFBM (1260 AM), WIRE (1430 AM), WISH (1310 AM), and WXLW (1590 AM). WIBC became the flagship station of the Indianapolis Motor Speedway Radio Network and remains so as WFNI.

=== "Radio Indiana, WIBC" ===
As television took over most network programming in the 1950s and 60s, WIBC switched to a middle of the road (MOR) format of popular adult music, news, sports and talk. The station established itself as a highly regarded full service broadcaster, placing an emphasis on its colorful air personalities.

In the 1970s, the WIBC stable included Jerry Baker, who was also the voice of Indiana University Hoosiers basketball and the Indiana Pacers; Paul Page, the voice of the Indianapolis 500 on radio and later on television, and who served as an award-winning newsman at WIBC in the early 1970s, reporting from the first Indianapolis-area traffic helicopter (known as the "Ten Seven-Oh Whirlybird") until a serious crash nearly killed him and his pilot in 1977; and Chuck Riley, who did afternoons before becoming a very successful voice-over talent in Los Angeles. Doing sports on Riley's afternoon drive-time show was "Hockey Bob" Lamey, who got that nickname from doing play-by-play for the short-lived Indianapolis Racers WHA team a decade before the Indianapolis Colts moved from Baltimore and named Lamey the "Voice of the Colts". Another long-time fixture was former news director Fred Heckman, who began at WIBC in 1957 and was recognized for his "My Town Indy" features.

During the Great Blizzard of 1978, WIBC was granted temporary emergency authorization for nighttime broadcasting at full daytime power (50 kW) until the storm was over. Normally the station was licensed to transmit with only 10 kW of power at night.

=== Switch to talk ===
Over the 1980s, more talk programming was added and music was reduced, as listeners increasingly turned to FM for music. Under new general manager Tom Durney, WIBC became a full-time talk radio station in January 1993—eliminating all music shows—and also updated its presentation and cut back its news department. The moves were controversial: news director Heckman walked out, claiming a hostile working environment, while far-right host Stan Solomon's statements resulted in a suspension and backlash from advertisers.

Current owners Emmis, who also owned WENS (97.1 FM), purchased WIBC and the FM station, by then WKLR-FM, in 1994 from Horizon Broadcasting for $26 million. Heckman, who had sued WIBC for age discrimination, settled his claim and returned to the station later that year. He remained at WIBC until retiring in 2000 at the age of 76.

== Sports radio WFNI ==
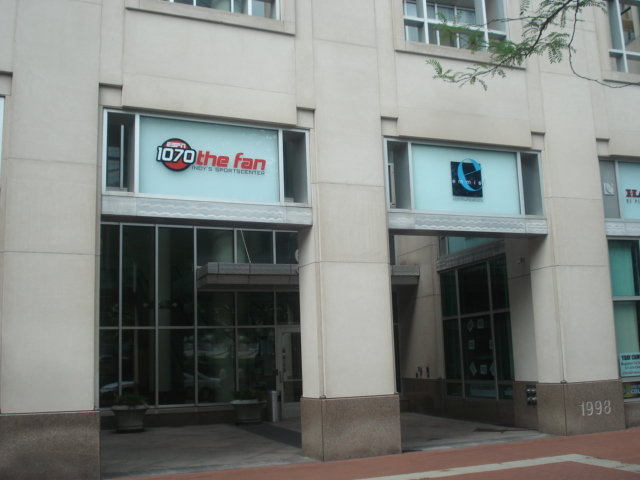
1070 at Emmis Communications

WFNI was born as a result of a three-frequency, two-company station swap. These moves were provoked in part because Emmis had acquired the rights to the Indianapolis Colts football team for the 2007 season, which left the station with the rights to all major sports teams in Indianapolis. To avoid tedious shuffling of games among its stations and frequent preemption of regular programming, Emmis decided to clear a frequency for a new all-sports station in Indianapolis. The move began on October 8, 2007, when the format and branding of Top 40 WNOW-FM ("Radio Now"), which was struggling, was sold to Radio One and moved to 100.9 MHz, the former frequency of now defunct smooth jazz WYJZ. This was done so that Emmis could clear the 93.1 frequency for news/talk WIBC, which had been on 1070 kHz on the AM band.

On October 8, 2007, it was announced that effective December 26, the WIBC call letters and news/talk programming would move to 93.1 FM, and that WIBC's sports programming would remain on 1070 AM, joined by programming from ESPN Radio, effective January 7, 2008. The new call letters WFNI were announced in December. 93.1 began stunting an all-Christmas music format as WEXM between October 8 and December 25. With the 1070 frequency open, Emmis launched its sports radio format on December 26 with a series of classic Indianapolis sporting events, ahead of its official launch date, January 7, 2008.

Prior to WFNI's launch, ESPN Radio talk programming had been heard on 950 WXLW, a lower-power station, from 2002 to 2007. Before that, 1260 WNDE was an ESPN Radio network affiliate from 1992 to 1994 and again from 1996 until switching to Fox Sports Radio in 2002. WIBC carried some ESPN Radio programming from 1994 to 1996, mostly GameNight on weekend evenings and some major live sporting events.

ESPN Radio's national sports broadcasts (MLB baseball, college football and NBA basketball) were all heard on WFNI, finally sorting out an unusual rights division among as many as four stations in the market during the early 2000s. (The NBA had often been heard on WIBC and Sunday Night Baseball on WNDE, regardless of which station had the main network affiliation.)

=== Local sports ===
WFNI was the flagship station of the NBA's Indiana Pacers, and the co-flagship, alongside sister station WLHK, for the NFL's Indianapolis Colts. WFNI was also the flagship of the Indianapolis Motor Speedway Radio Network, carrying the Indianapolis 500 (simulcast with WIBC), the rest of the NTT IndyCar Series, and all NASCAR races held at Indianapolis Motor Speedway.

In addition, WFNI aired the Indiana High School state championship games in football and girls' and boys' basketball (which was shared with WIBC in the event of Pacers conflicts). In its FM era, The Fan added baseball to its roster of state championship events.

Previously, WFNI aired Indiana University football until 2021, when it moved to WIBC, the longtime Indianapolis home of Indiana's men's basketball games. In addition, they were also the flagship for Butler Bulldogs men's basketball from 2010 to 2021. Butler basketball returned to The Fan (now 93.5 and 107.5) in 2025, moving to Fuego 92.7 (WLHK-HD2 & W224DI) when conflicting with the Pacers.

The Fan also became the flagship radio home of the Indiana Fever for the second time in 2025.

=== FM 107.5 The Fan ===
Former station logo as "1070 and 107.5 The Fan", used from 2017 until the station ending on August 2, 2021

The simulcast with FM translator W298BB (107.5 FM) was officially launched on February 19, 2013, following a short test period. At first, the translator sometimes broke away from 1070 with a different broadcast schedule, carrying ESPN Radio's The Herd and SVP & Rusillo in middays before simulcasting WFNI's The Ride with JMV. All other local shows and local play-by-play were simulcast, with the AM and FM feeds splitting whenever conflicts arose.

On October 16, 2015, Emmis split the simulcast of WFNI and W298BB. A new translator, W228CX at 93.5, began simulcasting WFNI full-time, as W298BB began carrying ESPN Radio on a full-time basis.

On March 30, 2017, the simulcast switched back to W298BB, due to problems with W228CX interfering with other nearby stations, while also discontinuing the full-time ESPN national feed. With the move, WFNI began calling itself "107.5 and 1070 The Fan". In preparation for the station's wind-down, the signal source for W298BB became WIBC-HD2 instead of WFNI, with the branding changing to "93.5 and 107.5 The Fan".

The AM frequency went off the air at midnight on August 3, 2021. Emmis sold portions of the land on which the AM station's towers were located for commercial real estate development.

On June 13, 2022, Emmis announced it would sell its other Indianapolis stations to Urban One. Emmis continues to own the WFNI license and occasionally runs the station on a temporary transmitter to preserve the license. The national ESPN Radio schedule is heard, aside from an hourly station identification.
