= WDNI-CD =

Television station in Indianapolis

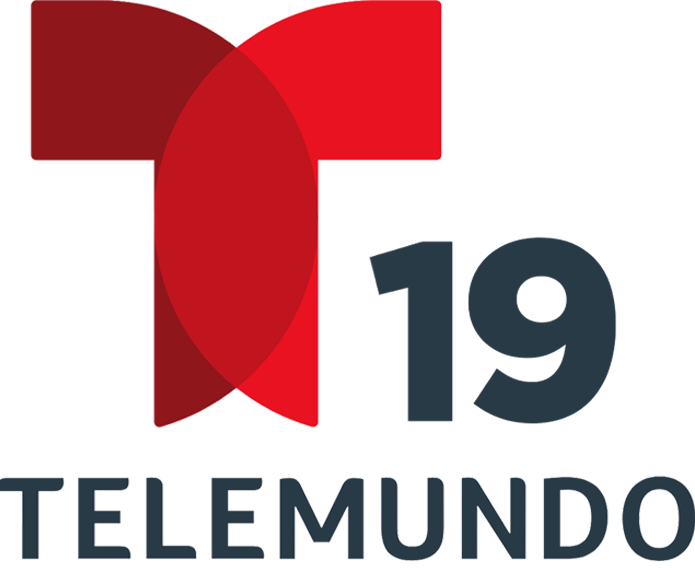
- Indianapolis, Indiana; United States
- Channels: Digital: 16 (UHF); Virtual: 19
- Branding: Telemundo Indy (general); Noticiero Telemundo Indy (newscasts)

Programming
- Affiliations: 19.1: Telemundo

Ownership
- Owner: Urban One; (Radio One of Indiana, LLC)

History
- First air date: March 7, 1989
- Former call signs: W53AV (1989–1999); W65DW (1999–2001); WDNI-LP (2001–2009)
- Former channel numbers: Analog: 53 (UHF, 1989–1999), 65 (UHF, 1999–2009), 19 (UHF, 2009); Digital: 19 (2009–2019)
- Former affiliations: America One (until 2001); MuchUSA (1990s); Independent/music videos (2001–2013)

Technical information
- Licensing authority: FCC
- Facility ID: 28199
- Class: CD
- ERP: 15 kW
- HAAT: 145.6 m (478 ft)
- Transmitter coordinates: 39°48′01″N 86°04′39″W

Links
- Public license information: Public file; LMS
- Website: telemundoindy.com

WDNI-CD (channel 19) is a low-power, Class A television station in Indianapolis, Indiana, United States, affiliated with the Spanish-language network Telemundo. The station is owned by the Radio One subsidiary of Urban One as one of the company's only two broadcast television properties (alongside WQMC-LD in Columbus, Ohio). WDNI-CD's studios are currently located at 40 Monument Circle in downtown Indianapolis, and its transmitter is located on North Hawthorne Lane and 23rd Street (south of I-70) on the city's near-northeast side.

== History ==
=== Early history ===
The station first signed on the air on March 7, 1989, as W53AV, broadcasting on UHF channel 53; founded by Hoosier Radio and TV, it was branded on-air as either "WAV53" or as "Hoosier TV 53". The station aired a variety of programming including public domain movies and Major League Baseball games from the Cincinnati Reds; it also carried the wrestling program ECW Hardcore TV on Sunday evenings. For a brief period in the early 1990s, the station served as an affiliate of the defunct Network One, and during the mid-1990s carried music programming (primarily in the overnights) from MuchUSA (now Fuse). Local personality Bill Shirk also hosted certain programs seen on the station. In 1999, the station moved its allocation to UHF channel 65 and changed its callsign to W65DW.

=== As "Indy's Music Channel" ===
Former logo as "Indy's Music Channel", used until March 10, 2013.

The station was purchased by Radio One in 2000, which changed its call sign to the lettered WDNI-LP the following year; at the same time, WDNI rebranded as Indy's Music Channel, adopting a music video format focused on the rock, alternative rock, hip-hop, R&B, dance and heavy metal genres.

The station's weekday programming featured music shows such as Drive Time with Reka; The Tease with host (and music director) Deacon; The Main Attraction with Scotty Davis; Max Hits with Mikey V; Free Style with JJ; The Rock Block with Rusty; The List with Stick; Hip Hop Rhythm & Vibes with Jay Rio and The After Party with DJ Wrekk1. The station also produced The Amos Brown Show, an hour-long locally produced weekday talk show that spotlighted notable figures in Central Indiana's African American community; the program was discontinued in 2007. Religious programming under the banner "IMC Goes to Church" aired for much of the day on Sundays. In 2009, the station relocated its signal to UHF channel 19.

=== Switch to Telemundo ===
On March 6, 2013, Radio One announced that it had signed an agreement with Telemundo to affiliate with WDNI-CD, making it the first television station in the Indianapolis market to carry programming from a major commercial Spanish-language network since WIIH-CA (channel 17) discontinued its affiliation with Univision in January 2009. WDNI-CD's affiliation switch to Telemundo became official on March 11, 2013.

WDNI-CD blacked out Telemundo's first ever Spanish-language coverage of the Indianapolis 500 in 2022 to prevent Central Indiana viewers from attempting to watch the race live before the tape-delayed broadcast on WTHR, as per the requirements of the Indianapolis Motor Speedway.

== News operation ==
WDNI-CD presently shows 11 hours of locally produced newscasts and programming such as Acceso Total Indy (weekdays at noon) and De todo de poco (Tuesday through Friday mornings at 5:30; Saturday mornings at 5:30 and 11; Sunday mornings at 9). The station produced the hour-long public affairs program En Contexto, which aired weekend mornings at 9 a.m. and weekday mornings at 5 a.m.; the program was hosted by Luis Navarro, who served as a special assignment reporter and main weather forecaster for WIIH's 6 and 11 p.m. newscasts during that station's tenure as a Univision affiliate. Telemundo 19 launched local Spanish-language newscasts in May 2025, airing live weeknights at 6 and 11.

== Technical information ==
=== Subchannels ===
The station's signal is multiplexed:

Subchannels of WDNI-CD
Subchannel	Res.	Short name	Programming
19.1	1080i	WDNI-HD	Telemundo

=== Analog-to-digital conversion ===
The station shut down its analog signal and flash-cut its digital signal into operation on UHF channel 19 in February 2009. Because the Federal Communications Commission (FCC) granted a license upgrade to Class A status after it transitioned to digital-only broadcasts, WDNI's call letters were not given an "-LD" or "-CA" suffix, but rather the then-rarely used "-CD" suffix.
