= WBLV =

WBLV and WBLU-FM
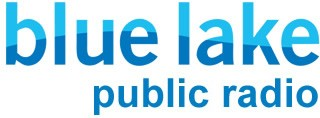

WBLV: Twin Lake, Michigan; WBLU-FM: Grand Rapids, Michigan; United States
- Frequencies: WBLV: 90.3 MHz; WBLU-FM: 88.9 MHz
- Branding: Blue Lake Public Radio

Programming
- Format: Public radio: classical, jazz
- Affiliations: NPR

Ownership
- Owner: Blue Lake Fine Arts Camp

History
- First air date: WBLV: July 3, 1982; WBLU-FM: August 18, 1979
- Former call signs: WBLU-FM: WGNR (1979–1992); WQMB (1992–1993)
- Call sign meaning: WBLV: Blue Lake Variety; WBLU-FM: Blue Lake

Technical information
- Licensing authority: FCC
- Facility ID: WBLV: 5902; WBLU-FM: 5903
- Class: WBLV: C1; WBLU-FM: A
- ERP: WBLV: 100,000 watts; WBLU-FM: 650 watts
- HAAT: WBLV: 185 meters (607 ft); WBLU-FM: 122 meters (400 ft)
- Transmitter coordinates: WBLV: 43°33′7.6″N 86°2′31.2″W; WBLU-FM: 42°59′15.1″N 85°37′26.1″W

Links
- Public license information: WBLV: Public file; LMS; WBLU-FM: Public file; LMS
- Webcast: Listen live
- Website: www.bluelakeradio.org

WBLV (90.3 FM) and WBLU-FM (88.9 FM), together known as Blue Lake Public Radio, are public radio stations licensed to Twin Lake and Grand Rapids, Michigan, United States. Owned by the Blue Lake Fine Arts Camp north of Muskegon, Blue Lake Public Radio offers a fine arts–oriented format with classical and jazz music serving Muskegon, Grand Rapids and areas to the northwest along Lake Michigan. Studios are located at Blue Lake Fine Arts Camp's campus on East Crystal Lake Road in Blue Lake Township (with a Twin Lake mailing address).

Blue Lake Public Radio began in 1982 with the launch of WBLV, which filled a large gap in NPR coverage. Meanwhile, in Grand Rapids, what is now WBLU-FM was established in 1979 as WGNR by the Grand Rapids School of the Bible and Music, a non-degree-granting Christian college, as a student teaching tool. In 1988, Echo Broadcasting, a local ministry rebroadcasting Moody Radio programming, bought WGNR and made it a semi-satellite of WXYB in Zeeland. Echo donated its stations to the network in 1991. When the school moved from what had been its campus, it evicted WGNR. As Moody's Zeeland station already decently covered Grand Rapids, it sold WGNR to Blue Lake Public Radio, who relaunched it as WBLU-FM, a full-time satellite of WBLV. In 2025, the station dropped NPR news programming.

== History ==
=== WBLV: Early years ===
In January 1980, the Blue Lake Fine Arts Camp in Twin Lake, Michigan, north of Muskegon, announced an expansion program to meet what it saw as increased demand for its camps for youth and to promote itself across the Midwest. Locally, it announced its intention to begin an educational FM radio station by 1981 or 1982. Blue Lake's plan was in part based on Interlochen Public Radio. The first director of Blue Lake Public Radio, Angus Forrester, arrived from Interlochen in January 1981. Even before the camp had a construction permit, it began applying for federal grants to cover construction and operation costs and identified a site near Hesperia that was suitable to establish a 100,000-watt regional station reaching from Ludington to Grand Rapids and Holland, while primarily serving the area between Ludington and Muskegon. In addition, Blue Lake launched a fundraising campaign, seeking to hedge against possible cuts to the federal grants for which it had applied.

The Federal Communications Commission (FCC) granted the construction permit in December 1981; its projected federal grant had been cut by a third. With construction in full swing, Forrester nearly died. On December 18, 1981, a furnace being installed malfunctioned, and Forrester and a supervisor were found unconscious after being overcome by carbon monoxide; though he did not die, he resigned before the station started, owing to health problems.

On July 3, 1982, WBLV began broadcasting during a benefit for Blue Lake Fine Arts Camp featuring comedian Bob Hope. It provided public radio to an area previously without a locally-focused NPR station. Previously, much of WBLV's coverage area had been served primarily by Michigan Radio satellite WVGR from Grand Rapids, with portions receiving fringe coverage from WCMU-FM from Mount Pleasant and WKAR AM-FM from East Lansing. For most of its four months on the air, the station was unable to air national NPR programming because it lacked a satellite receiving station, owing to the federal cuts. It had to depend on a jazz and classical music library containing only 1,000 records as well as a music syndication service. Even with limited offerings, it gradually scaled up its broadcast day from six hours at sign-on to 18 hours by the end of September 1982, qualifying it for a grant from the Corporation for Public Broadcasting. In 1985, it expanded to a 24-hour broadcast day.

The station had high turnover in management in its early years. After Forrester departed, four people managed the station in five stints between 1982 and 1985. This changed in 1987 when program director Buck Matthews was promoted to general manager. Matthews was familiar to West Michigan TV viewers as a weatherman, talk show host, and community relations director for WOOD-TV/WOTV in Grand Rapids. That same year, WBLV received FCC approval to add 200 feet (61 m) to its tower, extending its range.

=== WGNR: Christian radio ===
On October 19, 1979, WGNR began broadcasting on 88.9 MHz in Grand Rapids. It was owned by and located at the Grand Rapids School of the Bible and Music, a non-degree-granting institution whose students primarily staffed the outlet and used it as a training tool for Christian ministry. It aired a mix of student-produced music programming and student-produced and syndicated Christian talk and teaching programming. Originally a 10-watt station, the station increased its power in 1983. By then, there were seven Christian radio stations in the Grand Rapids area, two of which (WGNR and WCSG at the Grand Rapids Baptist Academy) were owned by educational institutions. Later that year, WGNR began carrying The Sight Seer, a new local radio reading service, on a subcarrier for the benefit of the blind community.

Another Christian radio station began broadcasting in the region on January 20, 1989: WXYB (89.3 FM), licensed to Zeeland. It was owned by Echo Broadcasting, whose backers sought to restore the programming of the Moody Radio network to West Michigan. Moody's Chicago station, WMBI, had once been audible in this area but was crowded out by new local stations. Two months before WXYB signed on, Echo purchased WGNR from the Grand Rapids School of the Bible and Music and flipped it to Moody programming. After WXYB signed on, WGNR became a semi-satellite, simulcasting WXYB for all but a few hours of the day. The addition of WGNR expanded Echo's service area to the east, inland from the lakeshore to include Grand Rapids.

Echo Broadcasting sold WXYB and WGNR to Moody Radio itself in 1991 for a titular purchase price of $1. Moody changed the Zealand station's call letters to WGNB after acquiring the stations. While Moody was acquiring the stations, the Grand Rapids School of the Bible and Music—where the WGNR transmitter was still located—was looking to move off its campus on Franklin Street, which no longer met its needs or current fire code. The former campus was sold to Grand Rapids Public Schools, which ordered the WGNR facility to be relocated elsewhere. Moody attempted to relocate the transmitter, but found it difficult to find an adequate site due to the density of radio stations in the area. Additionally, FCC regulations required decreasing the station's power if it moved. Moody also found that WGNB provided adequate coverage of Grand Rapids for an estimated 95 percent of listeners. As a result, it decided to put WGNR up for sale.

=== Combination ===
Moody elected to sell WGNR to the Blue Lake Fine Arts Camp, which desired to improve its signal in parts of Grand Rapids that did not get satisfactory reception of WBLV. It had already identified a new tower site in northeast Grand Rapids to house the station. To prepare for the move, WGNR left the air on December 28, 1992. The station returned at the end of June 1993 under new call letters, WBLU-FM. Sight Seer was not broadcast while WGNR was out of service.

In 2015, after a lightning strike to WBLV's tower forced reduced power, it was discovered that the 33-year-old mast needed replacement. The station was on reduced power for six months before the new tower was completed and put into service.

In March 2025, Blue Lake Public Radio announced it would drop all long-form NPR news programming that July, replacing Morning Edition and All Things Considered with additional local classical music blocks while continuing to air hourly NPR news updates. This allowed Blue Lake Public Radio to reclassify itself as an "NPR music" station with lower fee structures and was seen to better align with Blue Lake Fine Arts Camp's mission. Recent listener surveys had indicated that most listeners tuned to Blue Lake for music.

== Programming ==
Blue Lake Public Radio's weekday programming is classical music during the day and overnight with a late-night jazz music block, Jazz from Blue Lake. The station also airs a variety of syndicated classical and jazz music programs. Blue Lake Public Radio broadcasts the Grand Rapids Symphony and the West Michigan Symphony Orchestra in Muskegon, and during the summer it airs performances from the arts camp's Summer Festival.
