= WNAP =

WNAP may refer to:

- WNAP-FM, a radio station (88.1 FM) licensed to serve Morristown, Indiana, United States
- WNAP-LP, a low-power radio station (107.5 FM) licensed to serve Muncie, Indiana
- WNAP (990 AM), a defunct radio station (990 AM) formerly licensed to serve Muncie, Indiana
- WNAP (Pennsylvania), a defunct radio station (1110 AM) that was licensed to serve Norristown, Pennsylvania, United States
- WIBC (FM), a radio station (93.1 FM) licensed to serve Indianapolis, Indiana, that held the call sign WNAP from 1968 to 1986 and WNAP-FM from 1994 to 2000
