= WLHN =

WLHN may refer to:

- WLHN-LP, a low-power radio station (95.3 FM) licensed to serve Brandenburg, Kentucky, United States
- WNAP (990 AM), a defunct radio station (990 AM) formerly licensed to serve Muncie, Indiana, United States, which held the call sign WLHN from 1999 to 2007
- WIKL, a radio station (101.7 FM) licensed to serve Elwood, Indiana, which held the call sign WLHN from 1994 to 1999
- WGNR-FM, a radio station (97.9 FM) licensed to serve Anderson, Indiana, which held the call sign WLHN until 1991
