= WMBI =

WMBI may refer to:

- WMBI-FM, a radio station (90.1 FM) licensed to Chicago, Illinois, United States
- WXES, a radio station (1110 AM) licensed to Chicago, Illinois, United States, which held the call sign WMBI from 1926 to 2021
- Taiping Airport in Taiping, Perak, Indonesia
