= WGNB =

- Zeeland, Michigan; United States
- Broadcast area: Grand Rapids, Michigan; Holland, Michigan; Muskegon, Michigan
- Frequency: 89.3 MHz

Programming
- Format: Religious
- Affiliations: Moody Radio

Ownership
- Owner: Moody Bible Institute; (The Moody Bible Institute of Chicago)

History
- First air date: January 20, 1989
- Former call signs: WXYB (CP, 7/24/87-4/15/91)

Technical information
- Licensing authority: FCC
- Facility ID: 18425
- Class: B
- ERP: 30,000 watts
- HAAT: 152 meters (499 ft)
- Transmitter coordinates: type:city 42°50′14.00″N 85°59′17.00″W

Links
- Public license information: Public file; LMS
- Website: www.moodyradio.org/grandrapids/

WGNB (89.3 FM) is a radio station licensed to Zeeland, Michigan and serving the Grand Rapids and Muskegon areas. Licensed to the Moody Bible Institute, it is an owned and operated station of the Moody Radio network, airing a mix of Christian talk and teaching and contemporary Christian music. Studios are located on 84th Avenue in Zeeland, while the transmitter is located northeast of the city.

== History ==
WGNB signed on for the first time on January 20, 1989 as WXYB, a Moody Radio affiliate owned by Echo Broadcasting, a consortium headed by businessmen John Huesby and Wayne Huhta that sought to return Moody Radio programming to West Michigan. For decades, Moody Radio flagship WMBI in Chicago had a large audience in most of West Michigan. Despite its modest 4,000-watt power and status as a daytime-only station, it could be heard in most of the region, as far inland as Grand Rapids. As other stations signed on in the Grand Rapids-Muskegon-Holland corridor, WMBI was crowded out. However, according to Huesby, a former Moody Radio regional representative in West Michigan, WMBI had long been the only Christian station that could be heard in the area, and residents were saying, "We sure would like to hear Moody again."

After a six-year application process, Echo had initially hoped to sign on in February 1988, but it took until December 1988 to apply for the license. In the meantime, in October 1988, Echo bought an existing Christian station in Grand Rapids, WGNR (88.9 FM), from Grand Rapids School of the Bible and began operating it as a Moody affiliate a month later. Once WXYB signed on, WGNR became a semi-satellite of its Zeeland sister, simulcasting WXYB for all but a few hours. Despite operating at 30,000 watts, WXYB provided at least secondary coverage from Ludington to Benton Harbor, and eastward into Grand Rapids. WGNR augmented the station's coverage in Grand Rapids proper, since WXYB had to conform its signal to protect WEHB (now WNHG) in Grand Rapids at nearby 89.7.

Echo sold its stations to Moody Bible Institute, parent of Moody Radio, in 1991 for a nominal price of $1. Moody changed the Zeeland station's callsign to WGNB. The new owners were faced with having to find a new location for WGNR's transmitter, which was still located on the Grand Rapids School of the Bible's campus, but the school believed its campus on Franklin Street no longer met its needs. In any event, the Franklin Street facility was not up to current fire code. The campus was ultimately sold to Grand Rapids Public Schools, who ordered WGNR's transmitter relocated. However, finding a new site proved difficult due to the crowded state of the Grand Rapids radio dial. While Moody eventually found a new site, it discovered that under FCC rules, WGNR would have to significantly drop its power; it already operated at a fairly modest 3,000 watts. Ultimately, Moody decided to sell WGNR. According to station general manager Scott Keegan, the Grand Rapids market was "amply served" by WGNB; he estimated that only five percent of WGNR's audience would be unable to receive the Zeeland station, meaning "it didn't make economic sense to keep putting in the money" for a second signal. Ultimately, Moody found a buyer in the Blue Lake Fine Arts Camp, who operated NPR member station WBLV in the Muskegon area. Blue Lake changed the Grand Rapids station's calls to WBLU-FM, a full-time satellite of WBLV.

Since then, WGNB has been the sole Moody station in West Michigan. The station has long branded as "Moody Radio Grand Rapids," even though its signal primarily favors the Lake Michigan shoreline from Muskegon to Holland.
