= WGNR =

WGNR may refer to:

- WGNR (AM), a radio station (1470 AM) licensed to serve Anderson, Indiana, United States
- WGNR-FM, a radio station (97.9 FM) licensed to serve Anderson
