= WDLM =

WDLM may refer to:

- WDLM (AM), a radio station (960 AM) licensed to East Moline, Illinois, United States
- WDLM-FM, a radio station (89.3 FM) licensed to East Moline, Illinois, United States
