= WJCF =

WJCF may refer to:

- WJCF-LP, a radio station (102.7 FM) licensed to serve Doerun, Georgia, United States
- WNAP (990 AM), a defunct radio station (990 AM) formerly licensed to serve Muncie, Indiana, United States, which held the call sign WJCF from 2019 to 2021
- WNPP, a radio station (88.5 FM) licensed to serve Cole, Indiana, which held the call sign WJCF-FM in 2019
- WNAP-FM, a radio station (88.1 FM) licensed to serve Morristown, Indiana, which held the call signs WJCF from 2000 to 2008 and WJCF-FM from 2008 to 2019
