= WAY-FM =

WAY-FM may refer to:

- WayFM Network, a national, non-profit radio broadcasting network in the United States that primarily plays Contemporary Christian music
  - WAYM, the Franklin, Tennessee-based flagship station of the WAY-FM Network that goes by the handle 88.7 WAY-FM
- WNHG, the broadcast handle of a group of radio stations owned by Cornerstone University in Grand Rapids, Michigan known as WAY FM (Michigan)
