= WCDC =

WCDC may refer to:

- WCDC (AM), a radio station (950 AM) licensed to serve Moncks Corner, South Carolina, United States
- WCDC-TV, a defunct television station (channel 36) formerly licensed to serve Adams, Massachusetts, United States
- Wan Chai District Council, the district council for the Wan Chai District in Hong Kong
