= WMRI =

Currently silent
- Marion, Indiana; United States
- Broadcast area: Muncie-Marion
- Frequency: 860 kHz
- Branding: 860 The Score

Programming
- Format: Sports
- Affiliations: Infinity Sports Network; Chicago Cubs Radio Network

Ownership
- Owner: Hoosier AM/FM, LLC
- Sister stations: WCJC, WBAT, WXXC

History
- First air date: 1955
- Former call signs: WMRI (1955–1970); WGOM (1970–2006)

Technical information
- Licensing authority: FCC
- Facility ID: 6337
- Class: B
- Power: 1,000 watts day 500 watts night
- Transmitter coordinates: 40°33′12.00″N 85°38′45.00″W

Links
- Public license information: Public file; LMS
- Webcast: Listen Live
- Website: thescoreindiana.com

WMRI (860 AM) is a radio station broadcasting a sports format. Licensed to Marion, Indiana, United States, the station serves the Muncie-Marion area. The station is currently owned by Hoosier AM/FM, LLC and features programming from Infinity Sports Network.

== History ==
WMRI went on the air in 1955; it was initially owned by Chronicle Publishing Company but was soon sold. WMRI later spawned an FM station at 106.9 MHz (the present day WXXC).

From 1970 to 2006, the station was known as WGOM (for "Giant of Music", inspired by locally born James Dean's final movie Giant), with a Top 40 format before automating in the late 1970s. Rich Coolman, Stan Weil and Dave Gross "The Mad Doctor" (now at WLDE in Ft. Wayne) were some of WGOM's on-air personalities. At the time of the 1970 call letter switch, the station's Program Director was Ken Roberts, and on-air talent included Ed Shannon (Steve Brimmer), Craig Weston (Robert Skaff), Chuck Anthony (Doug Fredlund) and Mel Ballinger as News Director. The station's call letter change was accompanied by a new ID/jingle package from the renowned PAMS agency in Dallas, Texas, emulating the sound of WLS Chicago and other "top-40" era stations. Station Manager was Louis Disinger.

Having transformed the AM station, Roberts departed for Ontario, California in late 1971, with Jonathan Morgan (Jim Arnold) arriving from Tucson, Arizona (KHUT) as the new Program Director. In this period, WMRI-FM continued its automated music service with pre-programmed tapes. The following year, Arnold, Brimmer, and Ballinger all departed for Tucson albeit to different stations; Arnold and Ballinger went to KCUB, and Brimmer went to KIKX.

WGOM's Top 40 format competed with Muncie's WERK (then at 990 AM) and the former WHUT (now WGNR/1470 AM in Anderson) throughout the 1970s. Subsequent formats since the WGOM days included adult standards and Southern Gospel prior to the current sports format; the WMRI callsign was reinstated in 2006.

Former logo

On December 15, 2025, WMRI ceased operations and went silent.
