= WNAP (990 AM) =

Radio station in Muncie, Indiana, United States (1965–2022)

Muncie, Indiana; United States
- Broadcast area: Muncie, Marion and East Central Indiana
- Frequency: 990 kHz

Programming
- Format: Defunct (formerly classic rock)

Ownership
- Owner: New Beginnings Movement, Inc.
- Sister stations: WNAP-FM, WNAP-LP, WNPP, and translators

History
- First air date: February 14, 1965 (as WERK)
- Last air date: July 30, 2022
- Former call signs: WERK (1964–1999); WLHN (1999–2007); WRFM (2007–2019); WJCF (2019–2021)
- Call sign meaning: Heritage call sign in Indianapolis

Technical information
- Licensing authority: FCC
- Facility ID: 1724
- Class: D
- Power: 250 watts (daytime); 1 watt (nighttime)
- Transmitter coordinates: 39°45′01″N 85°33′19″W
- Translator: (101.5 MHz) W268BJ (Muncie)

Links
- Public license information: Public file; LMS
- Webcast: Listen Live
- Website: WNAP-FM website

WNAP was an AM broadcasting station at 990 kHz licensed to serve Muncie, Indiana.

== History ==
At 990 kHz, WERK first signed on in 1965 from a six-tower array south of Muncie. The original WERK "990 WERK" featured a Top 40 format, built by the Poorman family, who operated an ad agency. WERK was the first commercial station in east-central Indiana with a Top 40 format, and for many years competed with WHUT (1470 AM) in Anderson, WGOM (860 AM) in Marion, and with WHON (930 AM) in Richmond. The station was then sold in 1981 to the Galesburg Printing and Publishing Company after Robert Poorman's death.

The station was sold in 1991 from James Beatty to American Hometown Radio Corporation alongside WOKZ (104.9 FM). By that time, the station was airing a contemporary Christian music format. American Hometown sold the pair in 1997 to Dream Weaver Broadcasting.

In 1999, Dream Weaver donated the license to Electronic Applications Radio Service, a nonprofit organization, but did not include the 90-acre (36 ha) transmitter facility. As a result, EARS reactivated the station by means of an STA (special temporary authority) granted by the FCC, returning to the air as WLHN with 67 watts. The call sign was changed to WRFM in March 2003.

Greenfield-based Indiana Community Radio Corporation (ICRC), which operated WJCF-FM 88.1 in Morristown, acquired the station from Electronic Applications Radio Service. After the acquisition by ICRC, the station broadcast a news and information format as "True Talk For Indiana" then flipped to oldies in 2009 utilizing Scott Shannon's True Oldies Channel, which was a commercial 24/7 satellite music service offered by Citadel Media. WRFM also previously broadcast via FM translator W230AR 93.9; that translator was moved to Columbus, Ohio, in 2017.

Most recently, the station broadcast a simulcast of WNAP-FM. The WNAP call sign became available in 2021 and was taken on by this station on August 10, 2021.

Effective November 2, 2023, the Federal Communications Commission cancelled WNAP's license, due to it having been silent since at least July 30, 2022.
