= ESNE Radio =

Spanish-language Catholic radio network in the United States

- Country: United States, Mexico, Spain

Programming
- Language(s): Spanish

Ownership
- Owner: El Sembrador Ministries

History
- Launch date: March 1, 2003

ESNE Radio is a Spanish-language Catholic radio network based in the United States, owned by El Sembrador Ministries. Headquartered in Chatsworth, California, a Los Angeles neighborhood, ESNE broadcasts on 14 stations in the United States, Mexico and Spain. ESNE also broadcasts a Spanish-language television channel, ESNE TV, launched in 2002.

== History ==
On March 1, 2003, El Sembrador, led by founder Noel Díaz, began programming KHPY (1670 AM) in Moreno Valley, California, under a time brokerage agreement; it purchased that station in 2008. Díaz had previously started a weekly Catholic radio program, Dimensión de Fe (Dimension of Faith), in 1990.

In 2013, the network acquired KRXA, serving Monterey, California; the next year, it began brokering time on KURS in San Diego, later buying that station in 2016. A second southern California signal was acquired in 2015 when it picked up KTYM after Immaculate Heart Radio instead bought another Los Angeles outlet. In 2017, El Sembrador bought the construction permit for a new station in Enterprise, Nevada (near Las Vegas), KENT, for $125,000.

El Sembrador expanded into Utah by buying Ogden's 1430 AM—then KLO—for $260,000 in 2020. A third station in the Central Coast region of California was added later that year when the ministry purchased KKMC (880 AM) in Gonzales, California, from Monterey County Broadcasters. Additionally, in September 2020, El Sembrador filed to buy KDCO (1340 AM) in Denver—though not its associated FM translator—for $420,000.

In January 2021, El Sembrador reached a $725,000 deal to buy KYND in Cypress, Texas (near Houston), from Pro Broadcasting. On February 1, it began programming KWST in El Centro, California, under a time brokerage agreement; this was followed with a $325,000 purchase from Entravision Communications Corporation the following year. El Sembrador acquired 1110 AM in Chicago from the Moody Bible Institute, which had owned that station as WMBI since 1926, for $1.2 million in March 2021; this purchase added the oldest non-commercial Christian radio station in the United States to the network, and replaced a previous part-time time-buy on WNDZ.

KAFY in Bakersfield was acquired for $450,000 from AOTS Holdings in March 2023; its associated translator was not included in the deal, but was separately donated to El Sembrador that June. In late 2024, the network acquired KRQZ in Lompoc from Spirit Communications, operator of the Radio U network, for $195,000.

== Stations ==
=== United States ===
Call sign	Frequency	City of license	State
KRXA	540 AM	Carmel Valley	California
KAFY	1100 AM	Bakersfield	California
KWST K229CU	1430 AM 93.7 FM	El Centro	California
KKMC	880 AM	Gonzales	California
KTYM K268DD	1460 AM 101.5 FM	Inglewood Los Angeles	California
KRQZ	91.5 FM	Lompoc	California
KHPY	1670 AM	Moreno Valley	California
KTIT K297VN	1160 AM 107.3 FM	Rancho Cordova Sacramento	California
KURS	1040 AM	San Diego	California
KMBX (Note: Owned by Entravision Communications Corporation)	700 AM	Soledad	California
KLKE-AM	1540 AM	Ukiah	California
KDCO	1340 AM	Denver	Colorado
WXES	1110 AM	Chicago	Illinois
KENT	1540 AM	Enterprise	Nevada
KYND	1520 AM	Cypress	Texas
KMES	1430 AM	Ogden	Utah
KZTR-LP (Note: Owned by the Corporation of the Catholic Bishop of Yakima)	103.5 FM	Yakima	Washington

=== Mexico ===
- XEBBB-AM 1040, Guadalajara, Jalisco
- XENK-AM 620 Mexico City

=== Spain ===
- 88.2 FM, Almonaster La Real
- 104.9 FM, Gibraleón
