= WBYW =

WBYW may refer to:

- WGSX, a radio station (104.3 FM) licensed to Lynn Haven, Florida, which held the call sign WBYW from 2011 to 2017
- WNHG, a radio station (89.7 FM) licensed to Grand Rapids, Michigan, which held the call sign WBYW from 1991 to 1998
