= WCSG =

Coordinates: 42.796°N 85.649°W

- Grand Rapids, Michigan; United States
- Broadcast area: West Michigan
- Frequency: 91.3 MHz

Programming
- Format: Christian adult contemporary

Ownership
- Owner: Cornerstone University

History
- First air date: June 9, 1973
- Call sign meaning: College and Seminary of Grand Rapids

Technical information
- Licensing authority: FCC
- Class: B
- ERP: 37,000 watts
- HAAT: 174 meters (571 ft)

Links
- Public license information: Public file; LMS
- Webcast: Listen live
- Website: www.wcsg.org

WCSG (91.3 MHz) is a radio station in Grand Rapids, Michigan, United States, that broadcasts a Christian adult contemporary format. The station is part of Cornerstone Radio, a broadcast outreach ministry of Cornerstone University. WCSG typically competes for the most-listened station in the Grand Rapids radio market, according to Nielsen data.

WCSG is rebroadcast on three other stations throughout West Michigan:

- 90.9 WCFG - Springfield/Battle Creek
- 88.3 WCXK - Kalamazoo (Formerly WAYK)
- 89.9 WCXB - Benton Harbor (Formerly WAYO)

The repeaters are only acknowledged during hourly legal IDs. The four stations' combined footprint provides at least secondary coverage as far north as Fremont and as far south as Bridgman.

== History ==
WCSG began broadcasting after five years of preparation on June 9, 1973, with an easy listening and fine arts format. In 1981, WCSG's programming changed to a primarily Christian format and three years later, the station began broadcasting inspirational programming and music twenty-four hours a day, seven days a week, before evolving into its present Christian AC-based format. The vision of WCSG is to encourage, participate and equip the media for Christ and Christians in West Michigan.

== Advertising ==
As WCSG and its affiliates broadcasts on frequencies allocated in the United States for non-commercial educational use, WCSG is forbidden from broadcasting traditional, pre-recorded commercials. Instead, WCSG hosts regularly recognize both corporate and individual sponsors, similar to the approach used by other non-commercial and public radio stations. A typical "recognition" involves the host reading a slogan and a brief description of the goods and services offered by a corporate sponsor, or reading a personalized message written by an individual sponsor. The contributions of these sponsors account for 30% - 40% of WCSG's funding.

== Branding ==
WCSG hosts "City Stop" campaigns, typically during the summer, in which listeners can meet the hosts, participate in the station's latest donation drives, and win WCSG-branded prizes. The station also holds several giveaway campaigns annually, usually deeming caller number 91 as the winner. These campaigns are extensive, and typically last several weeks at a time.

WCSG uses an extensive suite of jingles to promote its branding. Multiple jingle packages are currently in use, all of which come from TM Century. The majority of the jingles used are from packages originally made for WTPI-FM in Indianapolis.

== Awards and honors ==
The station received a special recognition at the National Association of Religious Broadcasters convention in February 2001, when Focus on the Family selected WCSG from among 987 U.S. radio stations for its Station of the Year Award. In April 2001, the Gospel Music Association nominated WCSG for a Dove Award for Station of the Year. In 2007, R&R magazine recognized WCSG as 2007 Christian Station of the Year, Markets 26-100.
