= WNAP-LP =

- Muncie, Indiana; United States
- Frequency: 107.5 MHz

Programming
- Format: Oldies

Ownership
- Owner: New Beginnings Movement, Inc.

History
- First air date: 2005; 21 years ago
- Former call signs: WJPB-LP (2005–2021)

Technical information
- Licensing authority: FCC
- Facility ID: 124356
- ERP: 100 watts
- HAAT: 20.423 m (67.00 ft)
- Transmitter coordinates: 40°10′26″N 85°25′48″W

Links
- Public license information: LMS

WNAP-LP (107.5 FM) is a low-power radio station at 107.5 MHz with 100 watts of power in Muncie, Indiana.

It was formed as an FM simulcast with the former WLHN 990 kHz (later WNAP, now defunct), also located in Muncie. The station first signed on in 2005 as WJPB-LP.

WNAP-LP airs a oldies format as a simulcast of WNAP-FM (and its translators in Muncie and Edinburgh) and Cole, Indiana-based WNPP. WNAP-LP is owned and operated by New Beginnings Movement.
