= WMBW =

Coordinates: 34°57′43″N 85°22′40″W

- Chattanooga, Tennessee; United States
- Broadcast area: Chattanooga, Crossville
- Frequency: 88.9 MHz (HD Radio)
- Branding: Moody Radio Southeast

Programming
- Format: Religious/Christian radio
- Subchannels: HD2: Radio Moody (Spanish Christian); HD3: Urban Praise (Urban gospel); HD4: Way FM (Christian adult contemporary)
- Affiliations: Moody Radio

Ownership
- Owner: Moody Bible Institute; (The Moody Bible Institute of Chicago)

History
- First air date: July 1, 1973
- Former call signs: WKES
- Call sign meaning: W Moody Bible Institute W

Technical information
- Licensing authority: FCC
- Facility ID: 66021
- Class: C
- ERP: 100,000 watts
- HAAT: 460 meters (1,510 ft)
- Repeater: See § Repeater

Links
- Public license information: Public file; LMS
- Webcast: Listen Live
- Website: www.moodyradiosoutheast.fm

WMBW (88.9 FM, Moody Radio Southeast) is a non-commercial educational radio station licensed to Chattanooga, Tennessee serving the Chattanooga metropolitan area. Owned by the Moody Bible Institute since 1973, the station broadcasts a religious format and is the Chattanooga affiliate for Moody Radio.

WMBW extends its signal by using a repeater, WMKW (89.3 FM), in Crossville, Tennessee.

Local programming includes Moody in the Morning and The Journey Home, week-day drive-time programs.

== Repeater ==
Call sign	Frequency	City of license	Facility ID	ERP W	Height m (ft)	Class
WMKW	89.3 FM	Crossville, Tennessee	65986	500	425 meters (1,394 ft)	C3
