= Rex M. Rogers =

American religious leader (born 1952)

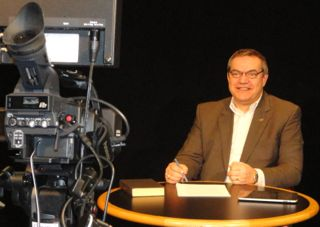
- Born: October 25, 1952 (age 73); Pasadena, Texas, U.S.
- Education: University of Cincinnati; University of Akron; Cedarville University
- Occupations: University Administration and Broadcast Management and Development
- Website: rexmrogers.com

Rex M. Rogers (born 1952) is retired, writes regularly, and produces a weekly podcast.

February 10, 2022, Rogers launched a new podcast, "Discerning What Is Best with Dr Rex Rogers," now available on most podcast platforms. It is a podcast applying unchanging biblical principles in a rapidly changing world, doing Christian critical thinking, or spiritual discernment, about current issues, culture, and everyday life (Phil. 1:9-11).

Rogers retired (Aug 2009 - May 30, 2025), as President of SAT-7 USA, the American promotion and fundraising arm of SAT-7, a Christian satellite television ministry by and for the people of the Middle East and North Africa. SAT-7, based in Nicosia, Cyprus, supports quality, indigenous-produced programming on four channels in three languages, Arabic, Persian, and Turkish.

Rogers was president of Cornerstone University from 1991 to 2008, tied for third longest serving president among independent colleges and universities in Michigan. He also served as a graduate assistant and on the faculty and/or administration at University of Cincinnati, Cedarville University, and The King's College. Rogers worked in 2008–2009 as vice president for The Timothy Group.

Rogers's website features a blog on current issues and events.

Rogers comments upon religion, politics, leadership, gambling, education, and other cultural issues. For sixteen years, Rogers was the author and voice of the radio program and newspaper column "Making a Difference". His programs and columns apply a Christian worldview to contemporary issues and concerns.

Sarah, Rogers's spouse since 1974, served as a board member and volunteer for Women At Risk, International, traveling extensively and speaking against human and sexual trafficking. She and Rogers have four adult children, their spouses, nine grandsons, and, finally, one granddaughter.

== Education ==
- University of Cincinnati, Cincinnati, Ohio - Ph.D. in political science with concentrations in public administration and research methodology. Dissertation title: "Hamilton County Home Rule: Political Change in the 80's," August, 1982.
- University of Akron, Akron, Ohio - M.A. in political science. Thesis title: "United States Supreme Court Justice John Paul Stevens: An Attitudinal Analysis," June, 1978.
- Cedarville University, Cedarville, Ohio - B.A. in social science, Senior Seminar title: "The Sino-Soviet Rift: Poly-centric Communism," June, 1974.

== Books published ==
- "We Hold These Truths"—Responsible Christian Patriotism," Bloomington: WestBow Press, 2026.
- Be One of God's Unlikely Leaders—Live With Focus, Get Things Done, Grand Rapids: Credo House Publishers, 2025.
- Today You Do Greatness: A Parable On Success And Significance, co-authored with Rick E. Amidon. Grand Rapids: Unlikely Leaders, 2011, ebook.
- Living for God in Changing Times, Grand Rapids: UnlikelyLeaders, 2011, ebook version of Christian Liberty.
- Gambling: Don't Bet On It, Grand Rapids: Kregel Publications, 2005, a revision and update of Seducing America.
- Christian Liberty: Living for God in a Changing Culture, Grand Rapids: Baker Book House, 2003.
- Seducing America: Is Gambling a Good Bet? Grand Rapids: Baker Book House, 1997.

== Selected media appearances ==
Interview on gambling in U.S. and also Christian ministry in the Middle East via SAT-7 on Janet Parshall's "In The Market," February 7, 2011.

More than 500 "Making a Difference" daily radio programs on a variety of contemporary issues on WCSG, WAYK, WAYG, October, 1993 to June, 2009.

Interviewed about traditional burial vs. cremation and also gambling trends on WTLJ “TCT Alive,” aired nationally on the TCT Network, February 29, 2008.

Guest Host, “The Rick and Scott Show,” topics: Racism, Youth Entitlement, Newsradio WOOD 1300, Grand Rapids, Michigan, November 23, 2007.

Interviewed live about gambling on "Talking It Over” with Janet Parshall, Moody Broadcasting Network, October 27, 2007.

Interviewed live about government assistance being used to rebuild casinos in post-Katrina New Orleans and Mississippi, for “Connected Coast to Coast,” MSNBC, with co-hosts Ron Reagan and Monica Crowley, October 10, 2005.

Interviewed live about gambling for “100 Huntley Street” with co-host Rhonda Glenn, Crossroads Television Network studios, Toronto, Ontario, Canada, October 6, 2005.

Interviewed about gambling for CBN News with anchorman Lee Webb, CBN studios, Virginia Beach, VA, August 16, 2005.

Interviewed about gambling for Focus on the Family's radio and CD series “Pastor to Pastor: Difficult Issues,” with host Rev. H. B. London Jr., WCSG studios, March, 2005.

Taped commercials for the “Let Voters Decide, Yes,” successful campaign for Proposal 1 requiring all future non-Indian gambling expansion measures to be brought to Michigan voters for a statewide ballot, November 2, 2004.

More than 40 "Making a Difference" pieces on a variety of topics re-taped and scheduled for Larry Burkett's nationally syndicated programs "Money Matters" and "Money Watch," later with Crown Financial Ministries, aired 1999–2004.

Interviewed for “Listen America” for a taped segment entitled “Gambling in America” with host Dr. Jerry Falwell, Lynchburg, VA, March 26, 1999.

Interview Panel on Legalized Commercial Gambling, "Focus on the Family" with Dr. James Dobson, Colorado Springs, CO, taped November 19, 1998 and aired mid-January, 1999.

More than 500 Interviews on book, Seducing America: Is Gambling a Good Bet? for Christian radio stations around the nation, including nationally syndicated programs, "Janet Parshall's America," Chris Fabry's "On-Line," and Larry Burkett's "Money Watch" and "Money Matters."

== Grants and awards ==
- "Barnabas Award, SAT-7 USA 2018," January 16, 2019.
- "Staff Member of the Year, SAT-7 USA 2016," January 25, 2017.
- “Rex M. Rogers Leadership Scholarship,” Cornerstone University, November 9, 2007.
- “Obadiah Award,” from Grand Rapids Theological Seminary, November 9, 2007.
- “Leadership Achievement,” Institute for Professional Development, Phoenix, Arizona, January 10, 2007.
- "Rolling Hills Schools Distinguished Alumni Hall of Fame," Meadowbrook High School, Guernsey County, Ohio, April 26, 2003.
- "Distinguished Service," Association of Independent Colleges and Universities of Michigan, May 24, 2000.
- "Honorary Alumnus of the Year," Grand Rapids School of the Bible and Music, Sept. 23, 1994.
- "Alumnus of the Year," Cedarville University, 1991.
- "Developing and Implementing a Christian Philosophy of Education," award from The King's College Alumni Association Faculty Research Fund supporting a short course taught to faculty of Universidad Nacional Evangelica, Santo Domingo, Dominican Republic, January, 1991.
- "An Analysis of the Socio-Political Attitudes of General Association of Regular Baptist Church Clergymen," award from the Cedarville College Faculty Development Fund for a survey research project with Robert G. Parr, January–April, 1988.
- "Religion and American Politics," grant from the Earhart Foundation, Ann Arbor, MI, conceived and wrote proposal for a distinguished visiting lecturer, December, 1987.
- "Change and Community Power: Hamilton County Home Rule," grant from the Stephen H. Wilder Foundation, Cincinnati, OH, for survey research questions and report, November–December, 1981.
- "Hamilton County Home Rule: Political Change in the 80's," grant from the Stephen H. Wilder Foundation, Cincinnati, OH, for a report, July, 1982 to September, 1982.
