= KRQZ =

- Lompoc, California; United States
- Broadcast area: Santa Maria—Lompoc, California
- Frequency: 91.5 MHz

Programming
- Language: Spanish
- Format: Catholic radio
- Network: ESNE Radio

Ownership
- Owner: El Sembrador Ministries, Inc.

History
- First air date: September 3, 2000

Technical information
- Licensing authority: FCC
- Facility ID: 78929
- Class: B1
- ERP: 4,000 watts
- HAAT: 238 meters (781 ft)
- Transmitter coordinates: 34°50′7.9″N 120°24′9.5″W

Links
- Public license information: Public file; LMS
- Website: esneradio.com

KRQZ (91.5 FM) is a radio station licensed to Lompoc, California, United States, serving the Santa Maria—Lompoc area. The station is owned by El Sembrador Ministries, Inc., and is part of its ESNE Radio Spanish-language Catholic radio network. Previous to ESNE's acquisition of the station in 2024, it broadcast a youth-targeted Christian rock format, relaying the signal of WUFM in Columbus, Ohio.

== History ==
The radio station started as the idea of former youth pastor Lenny Harris of Trinity Church of the Nazarene in Lompoc, California, who went on to become the station's general manager. The congregation raised $50,000 and took seven years to get its application approved by the Federal Communications Commission.

KRQZ was first signed on September 3, 2000. The station began airing the Christian rock format of the nationally syndicated Radio U network, originating from WUFM in Columbus, Ohio, with some local DJs. It was the first affiliate of Radio U. In addition to network programming, the station also broadcast local studio productions. The format gave teenagers and young adults locally to gain experience as DJs, producers, and engineers.

Initially, KRQZ transmitted from an antenna on the church steeple, in the shadow of a cross. It broadcast 24 hours a day at 1,000 watts power. As of 2003, its signal technically reached from San Luis Obispo down the Central Coast to Gaviota, but the station received calls from listeners as far north as Big Sur and as far south as Santa Barbara.

In 2014, Trinity Church of the Nazarene transferred the station's license to Spirit Communications, Inc., the nonprofit organization that owns WUFM.

Spirit sold KRQZ to El Sembrador Ministries, operator of the ESNE Radio network, in 2024 for $195,000.
