= KKMC =

- Gonzales, California; United States
- Broadcast area: Salinas; Monterey; Santa Cruz
- Frequency: 880 kHz

Programming
- Language: Spanish
- Format: Catholic radio
- Network: ESNE Radio

Ownership
- Owner: El Sembrador Ministries

Technical information
- Licensing authority: FCC
- Facility ID: 43603
- Class: B
- Power: 10,000 watts
- Transmitter coordinates: 36°33′45.9″N 121°26′8.8″W
- Translator: 97.3 K247BL (Tularcitos-Carmel)

Links
- Public license information: Public file; LMS
- Webcast: Listen live
- Website: esneradio.com

KKMC (880 AM) is a commercial radio station broadcasting a Spanish language Catholic format. Licensed to Gonzales, California, United States, it serves the Salinas-Monterey and Santa Cruz areas of Central California. The station is owned by El Sembrador Ministries.

KKMC's transmitter is sited off Jacks Road in Gonzales. Programming is also heard on low-power FM translator K247BL in Tularcitos & Carmel, California.

== History ==
On September 22, 1984, KKMC first signed on. It was owned by Monterey County Broadcasters with studios on East Alisal Street in Salinas. It has always aired a Christian radio format.

Former logo
