= KWST =

- El Centro, California; United States
- Broadcast area: Imperial Valley, California; Mexicali, Baja California
- Frequency: 1430 kHz

Programming
- Language: Spanish
- Format: Catholic radio
- Network: ESNE Radio

Ownership
- Owner: El Sembrador Ministries

History
- First air date: June 1, 1958
- Former call signs: KAMP

Technical information
- Licensing authority: FCC
- Facility ID: 33298
- Class: D
- Power: 1,000 watts (day); 36 watts (night)
- Transmitter coordinates: 32°48′27.2″N 115°32′21″W
- Translator: 93.7 K229CU (El Centro)

Links
- Public license information: Public file; LMS
- Webcast: Listen Live
- Website: esneradio.com/estaciones

KWST (1430 AM) is a commercial radio station licensed to El Centro, California, United States. It is owned by El Sembrador Ministries, broadcasting to the Imperial Valley and Mexicali, Baja California. KWST is a part of El Sembrador's ESNE Radio, with a transmitter sited off of Dogwood Road in El Centro.

Programming is also heard on a low-power FM translator in El Centro, K229CU at 93.7 MHz.

== History ==
The station first signed on the air on June 1, 1958, as KAMP. It was originally a daytimer, broadcasting at 1,000 watts but required to sign off at sunset to avoid interfering with other stations on AM 1430. KAMP was owned by the El Centro Radio Corporation and was one of the leading stations in the Imperial Valley for the next few decades. It carried, at various times, programming from ABC Radio and NBC Radio. It sometimes aired country music and sometimes it had an oldies format.

The station changed its call sign from KAMP to the current KWST by the Federal Communications Commission on March 15, 2001.
