= W. Wilbert Welch =

President of Cornerstone University

Walter Wilbert Welch (February 7, 1918 – July 16, 2015) was an American pastor and educator. He joined the teaching faculty of Cornerstone University in 1941, becoming president in 1959, and Chancellor in 1985.

== Cornerstone University ==
Welch was a pastor and held the degree of PhD. He took over the leadership of Cornerstone University as a small college meeting in a church basement, bought a 64-acre (26 hectares) cornfield, and built it into an accredited 4-year Christian liberal arts college.

Cornerstone University citation:

In 1959, with an enrollment of only 148 students, Dr. W. Wilbert Welch became the fifth president, a position he held until 1983. Under his leadership, the Bible Institute finally became a state-approved Bible college in 1963. In its new form, “Grand Rapids Baptist College and Seminary” was thus chartered to offer the Bachelor of Religious Education and Bachelor of Music degrees on the college side.

When told that the university's new clock tower was to be named in his honor, Welch's response was, "I appreciate it, but I don't need it. Maybe the shock of it will kill me."

== Ministry ==
- North Casnovia Baptist Church, Bailey, Michigan
- 1951-59 Senior Pastor: Calvary Baptist Church, Muskegon, Michigan
- 1959-83 President, Cornerstone University (formerly Grand Rapids Baptist Bible College)
- 1990-91 Interim Pastor: Calvary Baptist Church, Covington, Kentucky
- Biblical Evangelism boardmember

== Legacy ==
- W. Wilbert Welch Clock Tower article at WZZM-TV13 site
- W. Wilbert Welch Clock Tower article at Grand Rapids Press

== Published works ==
=== Books ===
- A Performance Pattern for Pastors and Churches (Grand Rapids: Welch, 2002)
- The Man Your Church Should Know (Grand Rapids: Kregel, 2004) ISBN 0-8254-3941-8
- Theolog '67 (Grand Rapids: Grand Rapids Baptist Seminary, Spring 1967), editor and contributing author
- Theolog '66 (Grand Rapids: Grand Rapids Baptist Seminary, Fall 1966), editor and contributing author

=== Radio messages on cassette ===
On file at Cedarville College

- Christ's Imminent Return (1982)
- The Great Tribulation (1982)
- Just Reminiscing (1981)
- The Loss of Spiritual Power (1980)
- Neo-Evangelism: Parts I, II, III (1980)
- The Importance of Stones (1977)
- Training Soul-Winners (1973)
- By Faith, We Understand (1964)
- Touched to Build (1962)

=== Booklets and pamphlets ===
- A Charge to Keep: The Book of First Timothy (Regular Baptist Press, 1982)
- The Christian Mission and Fundamentalism
- Conduct Becoming Saints – The Book of 1 Corinthians, Part 1, Chapters 1-8 (Regular Baptist Press, 1978)
- Conduct Becoming Saints – The Book of 1 Corinthians, Part 2, Chapters 9-16 (Regular Baptist Press, 1978)
- Decisions, Decisions, Will Someone Help Me?
- Developing a Biblical Perspective Concerning Believers, Demons and Exorcism
- Does Biblical Separation Destroy Christian Unity?
- The Early Church - Problems and Progress: Book of Acts, Chapters 1-13 (Regular Baptist Press, 1976)
- The Early Church - Problems and Progress: Book of Acts, Chapters 14-28 (Regular Baptist Press, 1976)
- The Fine Art of Being a Pastor
- The Trial of Your Faith: The Epistle of First Peter

=== Articles ===
On file at the Cornerstone University Archives, Miller Library

- The Word of God in Our Society
- Growing Old Isn’t All Bad
- Programming For Progress
- The Authority of the Word of God
- Attractive Churches
- Enjoyable Years for Senior Citizens
- God’s Creative Wisdom for the Body or “Beautifying the Bones”
- These Men Called Deacons—Who Are They, and Why?
- Consideration For Seeking Balance
- God’s Provisions for His Church
- The Divine Human Cooperative—How Does God Work?
- Yes, Christians Do Split Churches
- God’s Prescription for an Enjoyable Ministry
- It Is Time To Refocus On The Sunday School
- Understanding And Resolving Conflict
- The Man Your Church Should Know
- To Resign or Not to Resign-That is the Question
- Church Problems – Normal But Not Necessary
- Yes, Your Church Can Grow!
- The Word of God in our Society
- Christian Education and Evangelism
- Position Paper Accreditation and Christian Colleges
- The Pastor and Church Administration
- New Testament Evangelism
- Position Paper Two, Grand Rapids Baptist College and Seminary and Changing Standards
- Baptist Holiness
- The Divine Directive
- The One Who Works in You
- The Fundamentalists’ Hour
- Let’s Have Some Demonstrations
- Position Paper: Creative Days of Genesis
- Position Paper: The Use of Translations (green folder)
- The Rapture of the Church
- The Two Judgments
- The Final Destination of the Righteous and Wicked
- Let’s Talk About the Second Coming of the Lord Jesus Christ
- Is the Bible the Word of God?
- Heaven
- What is Hell like?
- The Two Resurrections
- Radio Bible Class

== Online publications ==
- Biblical Evangelist (March/April 2006)

== Quotes ==
“[Paul’s] instruction that the women of the church ‘adorn’ themselves modestly is not part of an ‘anti-attractive’ campaign. In fact, he said they should ‘adorn themselves,’ not detract. Their apparel was to be modest. There was to be no extravagance or undue emphasis placed on a woman’s physical attractiveness.” (A Charge to Keep, pg. 43 RBP, 1982)

== Roles at Cornerstone University ==
- 1941: Teaching Faculty
- 1959-1983: President
- 1983-2015: Chancellor
- 1991: Interim President
