= Steven Waterhouse =

America bible teacher

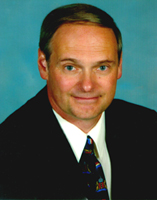
Dr. Steven Waterhouse

Steven Waterhouse (born August 23, 1956) is an American pastor, Bible teacher, and Christian author who has published works on counseling and systematic theology. Waterhouse has taught Bible doctrine in colleges and church ministries, has been the keynote speaker at National Alliance for the Mentally Ill (NAMI) conventions, and has lectured at various institutions and conference workshops on counseling.

== Life and career ==
Steven Waterhouse was born and raised in rural southern Michigan. His brother, Mark, was diagnosed with schizophrenia at age 17, and served as Steven's inspiration for his first published work, Strength for His People, written to comfort the families of those suffering from mental illnesses. He holds a Doctor of Ministry degree from Dallas Theological Seminary, a Master of Theology in Hebrew and Greek from Capital Bible Seminary near Washington, D.C., and undergraduate degrees in social sciences from Spring Arbor University and Cornerstone University in Grand Rapids, Michigan. He has been the pastor of Westcliff Bible Church in Amarillo, Texas since 1985.

== Publications ==
- Not by Bread Alone: An Outlined Guide to Bible Doctrine, Westcliff Press, 2000: an exhaustive reference guide for research in systematic theology and Bible doctrine. ISBN 0-9702418-2-8
- Strength for His People: A Ministry for Families of the Mentally Ill, Westcliff Press, 1993: written to comfort families who are experiencing the effects of mental illness. The central focus of the book is schizophrenia, however, it offers a wide application as a guide for Christian counseling for others with related problems such as Alzheimer's or major depression. ISBN 0-9702418-3-6
- Jesus and History: How We Know His Life and Claims, Westcliff Press, 2009: details the historical background of the Four Gospels of the New Testament and their primary focus: the life and works of Jesus Christ. ISBN 0-9774051-7-6
- Life's Tough Questions, Westcliff Press, 2005: provides Biblical counseling for critical life events including suffering, depression, suicide, death, as well as Scriptural insights on abortion and demon possession. This work was used for counseling victims of Hurricane Katrina, the Sago Mine accident, and the Virginia Tech shootings. ISBN 0-9702418-6-0
- Holy Matrimony: The Image of God in the Family, Westcliff Press, 2006: examines what the Bible says on marriage and the sanctity thereof, divorce and remarriage, gender equality, and others aspects of Christian marriage. ISBN 0-9702418-9-5
- What Must I do to be Saved?: The Bible's Definition of Saving Faith, Westcliff Press, 2000: details the Scriptural doctrine of salvation by faith. ISBN 0-9702418-0-1
- Depression Recovery-According to the Bible, Westcliff Press, 2008: a pamphlet describing the spiritual sources of depression and solutions according to the Bible. ISBN 0-9774051-6-8
- Blessed Assurance, A Defense of the Doctrine of Eternal Security, Westcliff Press, 2000: a treatise on the topic of eternal security addressing whether a Christian can lose his/her salvation. ISBN 0-9702418-1-X
- Outside the Heavenly City: Abortion in Rome and the Early Church's Response, Westcliff Press, 2006: originally written as Dr. Waterhouse's Master's thesis, this work is a history of obstetrics in the Greco-Roman world and comments on abortion by the Early Church Fathers.

Note: Translations of Strength For His People are available in Polish (ISBN 83-921410-0-8) and of Not By Bread Alone in Malayalam.
