= WBAT =

Radio station in Marion, IN, US

- Marion, Indiana; United States
- Broadcast area: Grant County, Indiana
- Frequency: 1400 kHz
- Branding: 105.5 The Wave

Programming
- Format: Full service Soft AC

Ownership
- Owner: Hoosier AM/FM LLC
- Sister stations: WCJC, WMRI, WXXC

History
- First air date: June 7, 1947

Technical information
- Licensing authority: FCC
- Facility ID: 41841
- Class: C
- Power: 1,000 watts (unlimited)
- Transmitter coordinates: 40°33′40.00″N 85°41′30.00″W
- Translator: 105.5 W288DN (Marion)

Links
- Public license information: Public file; LMS
- Webcast: Listen live
- Website: thewave.live

WBAT (1400 AM) is a commercial radio station licensed to Marion, Indiana, United States, and serving Grant County, including Muncie. Before going silent on December 15, 2025, it broadcast an oldies format, with a morning news and talk show, along with sports programming nights and weekends, including Chicago Cubs baseball. The station is owned by Hoosier AM/FM LLC.

The transmitter is on South Miller Ave., off West 2nd Street, near the General Motors Marion Stamping Plant. Programming has also been heard over FM translator W288DN at 105.5 MHz.

== History ==
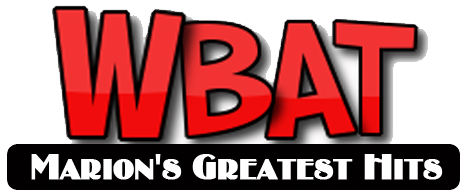
Logo prior to going silent in late 2025

The station signed on the air on June 7, 1947. It was originally a daytimer on 1600 kilocycles. WBAT was powered at 500 watts by day but was required to go off the air at night. It was owned by the Marion Radio Corporation.

The station eventually switched its frequency to 1400 AM, getting a boost to 1,000 watts and authorization to broadcast around the clock.

On December 15, 2025, WBAT ceased operations and went silent.

On November 18, 2026, WBAT returned to the air with full service soft AC as "105.5 The Wave".
