= Karolkiewicz family murders =

2026 familicide in Michigan, US

- Location: 43.0170°N 86.1586°W; 14936 Riverside Trail; Grand Haven Charter Township, Michigan, U.S.
- Date: July 24, 2026
- Attack type: Mass murder; mass shooting; spree killing; familicide; child murder; murder-suicide
- Weapons: 9mm semi-automatic pistol; Arson
- Deaths: 8 (including the perpetrator)
- Perpetrator: Kristopher Karolkiewicz

On July 24, 2026, a family of eight people were found deceased at a house in Grand Haven Charter Township, Michigan, United States. The perpetrator, 47-year-old Kristopher Karolkiewicz, shot and killed six of his children and their mother, before setting the house on fire and committing suicide.

== Murders ==
Investigators found that Kristopher Karolkiewicz first shot and killed his wife Amanda, and then their six children in the head, before setting multiple fires across different rooms and committing suicide.

First responders initially answered a call regarding smoke at the residence at 8:30 a.m. but could not locate the source. They were called back hours later when heavy smoke became visible.

Investigators found that Kristopher used a legally registered handgun to carry out the homicides and used it during his suicide. Investigators also found that Amanda Karolkiewicz, the mother of the family, died "on or after" July 23, before the children. At least three dogs and a cat also died in the fire. All the victims were found in their beds.

== Victims ==
Deaths

Victims:
- Amanda "Mandy" Karolkiewicz, 39
- Bennett Karolkiewicz, 12
- Caroline Karolkiewicz, 11
- Ella Karolkiewicz, 11
- Keegan Karolkiewicz, 15
- Smith Karolkiewicz, 11
- Theodore Karolkiewicz, 5

Perpetrator:

- Kristopher Karolkiewicz, 47

The victims included the mother of the family and their six children, who ranged in age from 5 to 15 years old. The children were identified as four biological children and two adopted daughters.

Amanda Karolkiewicz, the mother of the family, wrote a children's book titled The Magical Mantra in 2023, dedicated to her children.

The funeral for Amanda and the six children was held on August 24, 2026.

== Perpetrator ==
Kristopher Karolkiewicz (c. 1979 – July 24, 2026), aged 47, had worked remotely from home as the national Vice President of Sales and Marketing for the American Heart Association since September 2023, managing operations for their CPR and first-aid training division. The organization confirmed that his employment abruptly ended weeks beforehand in July 2026, though they declined to provide further details regarding his departure. He was listed as an alumnus of Cornerstone University.

According to the Ottawa County Sheriff’s Office, Kristopher purchased a 9mm semi-automatic pistol 8 days before the shooting.

== See also ==
- Iowa City Sueppel murders
- Hart family murders
