= SAT-7 =

Christian satellite television station

- Founded: 16 November 1995; 30 years ago
- Founder: Dr. Terence Ascott
- Type: Christian Satellite Television
- Location: Nicosia, Cyprus
- Region served: Middle East and North Africa, Europe
- Method: Satellite Television
- Key people: Rita El-Mounayer, International CEO
- Website: www.sat7.org www.sat7usa.org www.sat7brasil.org

SAT-7 is a Christian satellite television network broadcasting in Arabic, Persian and Turkish across 25 countries in the Middle East and North Africa, along with about 50 countries in Europe. SAT-7 was founded as a nonprofit organization in 1995 with support from Middle Eastern churches. SAT-7 is the first, oldest and largest Christian satellite organization operating in the Middle East and North Africa. Founder and President Dr. Terence Ascott served as International CEO from 1995 to 2019. In April 2019, SAT-7 appointed Rita El-Mounayer as International CEO. The not-for-profit organization is governed by an international volunteer board.

== Network and channels ==
The network consists of four channels: SAT-7 Arabic, SAT-7 Kids (Arabic language), SAT-7 Pars (Persian language), and SAT-7 Türk (Turkish language). SAT-7 Academy, an Arabic complementary educational brand, airs programs on the SAT-7 Kids and SAT-7 Arabic channels. More than 80% of programming is produced in the Middle East by Middle Easterners. A wide variety of genres are employed, including dramas, music videos, films, cartoons, game shows, teaching programs, documentaries, talk shows and current events programs.

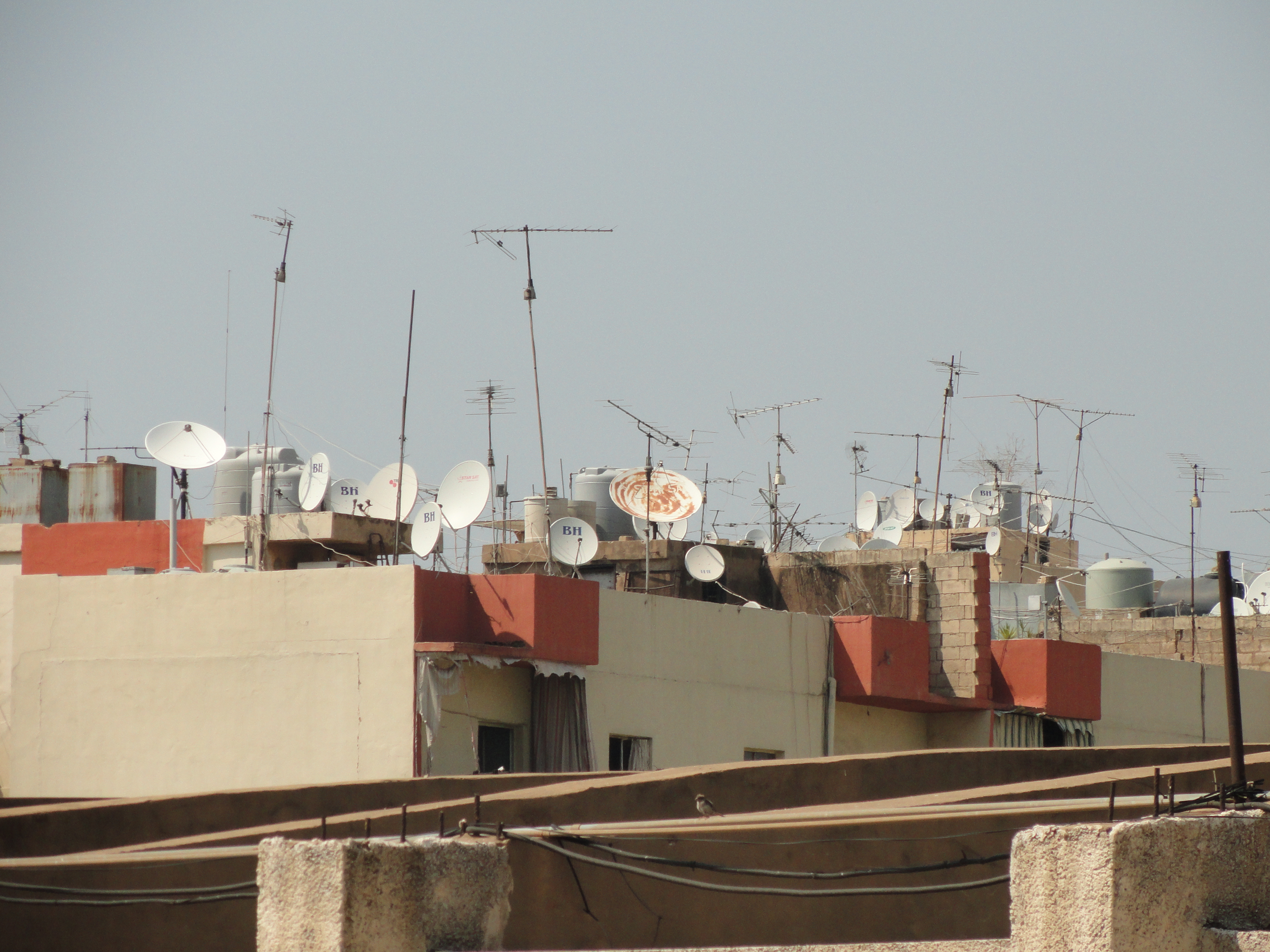
Rooftop Satellite Television Dishes typical in the Middle East and North Africa

SAT-7 programming is available "free to air" to any viewer with access to a television and satellite connection within satellite coverage areas. Estimates indicate about 90% of households in the region have access to a television and an average of 55-60% have access to satellite. In countries such as Iraq, satellite access is approaching 90% of the population. An independent survey indicated 1 in 3 Iraqi children and 1 in 4 Saudi Arabian children watch SAT-7 Kids. In 2018, the overall viewing audience of its channels is estimated at over 25 million.

SAT-7 is financially supported by interested individuals, churches, corporations and foundations from the Middle East and North Africa and around the world. The organization's mission is advanced by support offices: SAT-7 Brasil, SAT-7 Canada, SAT-7 Europe, SAT-7 Hong Kong, SAT-7 UK, and SAT-7 USA Rex M. Rogers. SAT-7 USA is a 501(c)3 organization at SAT-7 USA English language home page.

SAT-7 international headquarters is located in Nicosia, Cyprus.

=== SAT-7 Arabic ===
SAT-7 Arabic launched on 31 May 1996, to provide Arab language Christian programming with blocks of programming specifically for children, youth, and women.

=== SAT-7 Kids ===
SAT-7 Kids launched on 10 December 2007. It aims to make Christian programming available to an entire generation of Arab children.

=== SAT-7 Pars ===
SAT-7 Pars launched on 18 December 2006, although Persian broadcasts began on 12 September 2002 on SAT-7 ARABIC.

=== SAT-7 Türk ===
SAT-7 has been broadcasting Turkish-language programs from its sister channel, Türk-7, for several years beginning in January 2006.

In January 2010, the Turkish ministry merged with SAT-7 to become its fourth channel – SAT-7 Türk. The channel began broadcasting on the Türksat 4A satellite on 31 December 2014.

=== SAT-7 Academy ===
SAT-7 Academy is a SAT-7 brand name for Arabic language education programming aired via SAT-7 Kids. Programs feature instructional content for children, parents, and teachers.

The SAT-7 website states that "SAT-7 has always been committed to holistic programming, with the aim of ministering to people in all areas of their life: spiritual, emotional, psychological and physical." Programming has included dramas promoting the rights of children and women, documentaries about micro-enterprise development, and game shows and music clips that have fostered a better understanding of the needs and potential of the disabled.

SAT-7 Academy programming was developed out of concerns of "losing a generation" of Arab children who miss school due to conflict. In response, SAT-7 began on-air classroom-style programming for displaced and refugee children in the Levant.

In the decade before the Arab Spring, the UNDP report on Arab Human Development (2003 – 2009) cited three causes for what it called the severe "backwardness" in the Arab World. One of these principal causes was the widespread lack of opportunity for a good education. Not just having the chance to go to school and learning how to read, but children need to be taught to think for themselves, be equipped and encouraged to question, to be creative and to learn essential life skills.

And, while SAT-7 is always seeking to build such ideas into our on-air programming for children, the network also wishes to address the needs and attitudes of poorly trained teachers and parents. Many have not experienced a form of education that goes beyond rote learning, where violence has been a standard way of maintaining class and home discipline and where an obsession with coming up with "the right" answers has stunted any free thought...or the concept that there might actually be no right answers to some questions.

The idea of educational programming is in fact much more than just the delivery of instruction modules for children and youth hungry to learn the basics of literacy and mathematics. The concept is much more holistic and concerned about the values, attitudes, and character of the next generation in the Arab World; to see Arab children grow up well and to shape a much more inclusive, creative, and democratic society.
