= Leon J. Wood =

American theologian

Leon James Wood (1918–1977) was an American theologian.

He is the author of one of the few books on the Holy Spirit as portrayed in the Old Testament as opposed to the New Testament. Wood wrote, "The evidence that spiritual renewal, or regeneration, was true of such Old Testament people lies mainly in two directions. One is that these people lived in a way possible only for those who had experienced regeneration, and the other is the avenue of logical deduction that argues back from New Testament truth."

According to Wood, the Scripture stated that the Holy Spirit God is omnipresent and necessary in the current age prior to the Church's Rapture and the Great Tribulation, for imparting a new life "to those who trust Christ as their Saviour". His action mainly differs from the past in that the Holy Spirit "will cease one aspect of His work, namely, the restraint of sin in the world" (2Thess 2:7).

== Education ==
Wood was educated at Calvin Theological Seminary with graduate studies in Israel through New York University and at the Oriental Institute, Chicago. He received his Ph.D. degree from Michigan State University.

== Legacy ==
The Seminary building of Cornerstone University's Grand Rapids Theological Seminary, where Wood taught Old Testament Studies for many years (1946–1975) and served as Academic Dean (1952–1973), is named the Leon J. Wood Seminary Building in his honor in 1977.

From 1973 to 1977, Wood served as a translator/editor on the project which resulted in the creation of the New International Version (NIV) of the Bible.

Wood is best known for his advocacy and promotion of the controversial "gap theory" of Creation Science and his spirited defence of the plenary inspiration of Scripture. Several of Dr. Wood's books were published in the two or three years following his 1977 death.

== Published works ==
Several of these works have been translated into other languages, primarily Spanish

- The Bible and Future Events (Grand Rapids: Zondervan, 1973) ISBN 0-310-34701-7
- Commentary on Daniel (Grand Rapids: Zondervan, 1975) ISBN 0-310-34711-4
- The Distressing Days of the Judges (Grand Rapids: Zondervan, 1981) ISBN 0-310-34730-0
- Elijah: Prophet of God
- Genesis: A Study Guide (Grand Rapids: Zondervan, 1976) ISBN 0-310-34743-2
- The Holy Spirit in the Old Testament (Grand Rapids: Zondervan, 1976) Alibris ID: 8615080922
- Israel's United Monarchy (Grand Rapids: Baker Bookhouse, 1979) ISBN 0-8010-9622-7
- The Prophets of Israel (Grand Rapids: Baker Bookhouse, 1979) ISBN 0-8010-2198-7
- A Shorter Commentary on Genesis (Wipf & Stock, 1998) ISBN 1-57910-140-2 reprint of original 1975 edition
- A Survey of Israel's History (Grand Rapids: Zondervan, 1970) ISBN 0-310-34760-2 (includes intertestamental history in later editions)
