= KTYM =

Spanish-language Catholic radio station in Inglewood, California

- Inglewood, California; United States
- Broadcast area: Los Angeles area
- Frequency: 1460 kHz

Programming
- Language: Spanish
- Format: Catholic radio
- Network: ESNE Radio

Ownership
- Owner: El Sembrador Ministries

History
- First air date: February 14, 1958

Technical information
- Licensing authority: FCC
- Facility ID: 67519
- Class: B
- Power: 5,000 watts day 500 watts night
- Transmitter coordinates: 34°00′27″N 118°21′57.3″W
- Translator: 101.5 K268DD (Los Angeles)

Links
- Public license information: Public file; LMS
- Webcast: Listen Live
- Website: www.ktym.media

KTYM (1460 AM) is a radio station broadcasting on-air and via the internet. Licensed to Inglewood, California, United States, the station serves the Los Angeles area and an international internet audience. KTYM is owned by El Sembrador Ministries of Chatsworth, California.

== History ==
=== The Early years ===
Albert John Williams obtained the construction permit for a new daytime-only radio station on 1460 kHz in Inglewood on August 1, 1957. The station signed on February 14, 1958, airing a format of popular and semi-classical music; the same day, KTYM-FM 103.9 debuted as a simulcast. It had a policy of no back-to-back commercials.

KTYM-FM 103.9 was known for its programming for the Black community in southern California at night. The station increased its power to 5,000 watts directional in 1962, having been approved for the upgrade the year before. In 1963, the AM station added several foreign-language programs. At the end of 1963, Williams transferred the KTYM stations to the Trans America Broadcasting Corporation, wholly owned by Williams.

By 1964, while other Los Angeles stations were being accused of racial bias in hiring, KTYM-AM-FM was cited as just one of five racially integrated radio stations in the region.

=== Antisemitism inquiry ===
In June 1966, the Federal Communications Commission renewed the license of KTYM by a 5–1 vote. The decision was contentious because, although KTYM had a good record on racial integration, the Anti-Defamation League (ADL) objected to two airings of the program "Richard Cotten's Conservative Viewpoint" in October 1964 and May 1965. The ADL claimed that these shows linked Jews to communism and included personal attacks on the ADL itself. However, the commissioners said that, despite their "strongest personal feelings" against the content of the programs, they could not intervene in the matter without becoming "the censor of broadcasting" and they cited that KTYM had offered the ADL airtime under the Fairness Doctrine. The decision was decried by local labor groups and Jewish organizations.

The ADL appealed the case to the Supreme Court of the United States, which declined to take it up in 1969. That same year, Williams bought Fresno television station KAIL-TV for $236,500.

=== Sale to Avant Garde Broadcasting ===
In 1971 Williams reached a deal to sell KTYM-FM to the Black-owned Avant Garde Broadcasting, headed by Clarence Avant. He spent much of the decade starting up KDWN, a 50,000-watt AM station in Las Vegas. The station was approved for 500 watts at night in 1979. Personalities who hosted programs on KTYM included Stewart Alexander and Earl Ofari Hutchinson.

Williams died in 2005.

Former logo

=== Sale to Immaculate Heart Radio ===
By the 2010s, KTYM primarily aired a mix of religious talk shows and paid programming. On March 17, 2014, Trans America reached a deal to sell KTYM to IHR Educational Broadcasting, operator of the Immaculate Heart Radio network, potentially expanding the latter's reach into Los Angeles. However, the KTYM purchase was put on hold, and on July 22, 2014, Immaculate Heart Radio announced the purchase of Spanish-language KHJ, which switched formats to Catholic religious programming.

=== Sale to ESNE ===
In March 2015, the sale of KTYM to Immaculate Heart Radio was finally approved by the FCC, but six months later, KTYM was instead sold to ESNE Radio, a Spanish-language Catholic radio network based in the United States, owned by El Sembrador Ministries, with headquarters in Chatsworth, California. ESNE broadcasts on 14 stations in the United States, Mexico, and Spain.

KTYM broadcasts primarily to the Black community in the English language. Since 2016 it has been available as KTYM Media, a 24/7 internet streaming radio and video service, playing Christian preaching, Gospel music, R&B, Jazz, inspirational talk shows, and educational, historical, and cultural programs in addition to its faith-based programming.
