= KRXA =

Radio station in Carmel Valley, California

- Carmel Valley, California; United States
- Broadcast area: Salinas; Monterey; Santa Cruz
- Frequency: 540 kHz

Programming
- Language: Spanish
- Format: Catholic radio
- Network: ESNE Radio

Ownership
- Owner: El Sembrador Ministries

History
- First air date: July 10, 1989
- Former call signs: KPUP, KHKN, KIEZ, KSRK, KYAA, KMEO, KXME

Technical information
- Licensing authority: FCC
- Facility ID: 9849
- Class: B
- Power: 10,000 watts (day); 500 watts (night)
- Transmitter coordinates: 36°39′35.9″N 121°32′32.8″W

Links
- Public license information: Public file; LMS
- Website: elsembradorministries.com/esne/thesower/radio

KRXA (540 AM) is a radio station broadcasting a Spanish Catholic format. Licensed to Carmel Valley, California, the station serves the Salinas, Monterey and Santa Cruz areas of Central California. It is owned by El Sembrador Ministries and broadcasts its Spanish-language ESNE Radio Catholic radio network.

KRXA 's transmitter is sited on Old Stage Road in Salinas.

== History ==
On July 19, 1987, the station signed on the air. Its original call sign before it went on the air, as a construction permit, was KJCC.

In 1995, after being purchased by Cypress Communications, KIEZ switched from a Spanish language KKLF simulcast to its own adult standards format. From 2005 to 2012, the station had a progressive talk format.

When KRXA was sold to El Sembrador, the progressive talk moved to RadioMonterey.com. With the sale, KRXA switched to a Spanish Catholic format.
