= KYND =

- Cypress, Texas; United States
- Broadcast area: Greater Houston
- Frequency: 1520 kHz

Programming
- Language: Spanish
- Format: Christian
- Network: ESNE Radio

Ownership
- Owner: El Sembrador Ministries

History
- Founded: November 1987
- First air date: March 1, 1990; 35 years ago
- Call sign meaning: "Kind"

Technical information
- Licensing authority: FCC
- Facility ID: 40696
- Class: D
- Power: 25,000 watts (day); 18,000 watts (critical hours)
- Transmitter coordinates: 29°53′13″N 96°0′52″W
- Translator: 99.9 K260CH (Dilley)

Links
- Public license information: Public file; LMS
- Website: elsembradorministries.com/esne/radio

KYND (1520 AM) is a commercial terrestrial radio station, licensed to the unincorporated Harris County community of Cypress, serving the Houston, Texas metropolitan area as a Class D daytime only operating facility. KYND is owned by El Sembrador Ministries.

== History ==
1520 KYND has been brokered for the majority of its existence. Having first been proposed in 1978 by original owner Matthew Provenzano, the facility was granted a construction permit as a Class D facility in November 1987, utilizing 500 watts daytime only, from a 4-tower array west of Telge Rd. The 4 towers were originally of identical height at 38.4 meters. The facility received a license to cover on March 1, 1990. In 1993, KYND was upgraded to 3 kilowatts, daytime only, but with a critical hours power of 2.6 kilowatts. The current 25 kilowatt daytime operation was granted in 2012. KYND's critical hours power is licensed at 18 kilowatts.

While KYND has attempted to acquire a nighttime authorization previously, and a construction permit was granted to give the facility its first night operations (at a power of only 2 watts from a location in SW Houston near U.S. 59) the plan was scrapped, given that the minuscule power level would serve an extremely small section of Houston, and certainly not cover the COL of Cypress, northwest of the major metropolitan area.

KYND has broadcast in Vietnamese, Desi, English, and Spanish throughout its existence.

It was briefly programmed with a classic hits music format after China Radio International (CRI) concluded its contractual lease agreement with Pro Broadcasting in December 2015, and on various other occasions when KYND has been unable to secure a paying client for the broadcast time that the ownership offers to interested parties.

The station was leased in May 2016, by Synergy Broadcasting, who returned the longtime Urban Oldies and Talk programming that had previously aired on 1430 KCOH radio until 2013, on the reincarnated KCOH on 1230 until 2015, and later on KJOZ until 2016.

On December 22, 2016, Class D translator K260CH Dilley received a license to cover, rebroadcasting KYND programming. The owner of the licensed translator claimed to be broadcasting KYND from its location in Dilley, Texas, something ownership of KYND had no prior knowledge of until it was licensed. The owner of the translator had attempted to move the station to Cypress, Texas, but permission was declined by the FCC.

On September 11, 2017, KYND lost regular leased programming it had contracted with Synergy Broadcasting, when Synergy moved to KLVL in Pasadena. KYND then broadcast a continuous loop promotional, voiced by the station's former General Manager, giving information concerning leasing availability of the station. This looped message would be broadcast for over 2 years.

KYND operates on the same frequency with legacy "clear channel" station KOKC-AM in Oklahoma City, Oklahoma, which limits KYND to broadcast during daytime hours only. AM stations (which were not Class A) on clear-channel frequencies were sometimes licensed for daytime hours only prior to 1987.

The facility was purchased by El Sembrador Ministries on March 31, 2021, replacing the looped barker message, and joining the buyer's ESNE Radio Network.
