= Norman F. Douty =

Norman Franklin Douty (1899–1993) was a Christian author and pastor.

== Biography ==
Douty was born in Central Pennsylvania on January 14, 1899. He came to faith in 1910 and was licensed to preach in 1919. After graduating from seminary, he served as a pastor in several churches before taking up an itinerant ministry throughout the USA.

He was called to serve as president of Cornerstone University in Grand Rapids, Michigan, in 1944, but the original urge to preach induced him to leave his college post in 1945. He first took up conference work, then a pastorate. He is best known for having authored a detailed refutation of "the false doctrine of limited atonement," and several other theological treatises. Though he was Baptist, he also authored works on the Seventh-day Adventist Church. He described himself as "a moderate Calvinist, a traditional Baptist, and a convinced premillennarian... but a lover of all the saints, whatever their classification may be". Rev. Douty sold his collection of 4,000 books to Cornerstone University for $4500, payable in installments, giving the university's John C. Miller Library a substantial jump start.

== Death ==
He died October 25, 1993, in Union County, Pennsylvania.

== Published works ==
- The Abrahamic Covenant: Its Relation to Israel and the Church (no publishing mark, 1984) ASIN B00072WLXU
- Another Look at Seventh-Day Adventism (Grand Rapids: Baker Book House, 1962)
- The Case of D. M. Canright - (Grand Rapids: Baker Book House, 1964); full text online
- The Death of Christ (Swengel, PA: Reiner Publications, 1972)
- The Death of Christ: A Treatise Which Considers the Question: 'Did Christ Die Only for the Elect?' (Irving, TX: Williams & Watrous Publishing Co., 1978)
- Death Vanquished: First Corinthians Fifteen (Zondervan Pub. House; 1st edition, 1939)
- Did Christ Die Only for the Elect: A Treatise on the Extent of Christ's Atonement (Wipf & Stock reprint, 1998) ISBN 1-57910-135-6
- The Douty-Smith and Beck-Price Families: Correlated with Those of Crites, Hecker, Poorman, Ream and Wolfart (a genealogical work, 1974)
- Good Reasons for Believing in Christ and the Gospels (1984)
- The Great Tribulation Debate: Has Christ's Return Two Stages? (Gibbs, 1976) ASIN B0006YP4YW
- Isaiah's Portrait of Messiah (Isaiah 53) (pamphlet, n.d.)
- Jesus of Nazareth, According to His Own Words (Swengel, PA: Reiner Publications, 1984)
- Loving Kindness of the Sovereign God
- Union with Christ (Swengel, PA: Reiner Publications, 1973) ISBN 1-151-35924-6
- The Word of God and the Matter of Divorce (Swengel, PA: Reiner Publications, 1964)
