= WCJC =

- Van Buren, Indiana; United States
- Broadcast area: Marion, Indiana
- Frequency: 99.3 MHz
- Branding: Your Country 99.3 WCJC

Programming
- Format: Country music
- Affiliations: Compass Media Networks

Ownership
- Owner: Hoosier AM/FM LLC (sale to Taylor University pending)
- Sister stations: WXXC, WBAT, WMRI

Technical information
- Licensing authority: FCC
- Facility ID: 41840
- Class: A
- ERP: 3,000 watts
- HAAT: 100.0 meters
- Transmitter coordinates: 40°40′1.00″N 85°37′50.00″W

Links
- Public license information: Public file; LMS
- Webcast: Listen Live
- Website: wcjc.com

WCJC (99.3 FM) is a radio station broadcasting a country music format. Licensed to Van Buren, Indiana, United States, the station serves the Fort Wayne area. The station is currently owned by Hoosier AM/FM LLC, formerly Mid-America Radio Group, Inc.

The station's line-up includes Big John (John Morgan) in the mornings (5–10 am), Ben Rutz from 10 am to 2 pm, And Paisley Dunn (2–7 pm) and The Big Time with Whitney Allen from 7 pm to Midnight. WCJC carries Fox News in the morning and local news with Ed Thurman throughout the day.
