= KHPY =

Coordinates: 34°00′42.1″N 117°11′6.1″W

- Moreno Valley, California; United States
- Broadcast area: Riverside - San Bernardino - Inland Empire
- Frequency: 1670 kHz

Programming
- Language: Spanish
- Format: Catholic talk and teaching
- Network: ESNE Radio

Ownership
- Owner: El Sembrador Ministries

History
- First air date: 1989; 37 years ago (on 1530 AM)

Technical information
- Licensing authority: FCC
- Facility ID: 87156
- Class: B
- Power: 10,000 watts (days); 9,000 watts (nights)

Links
- Public license information: Public file; LMS
- Webcast: Listen Live
- Website: elsembradorministries.com

KHPY (1670 kHz) is an AM radio station in Moreno Valley, California, broadcasting to the Riverside-San Bernardino-Inland Empire radio market. KHPY airs Spanish-language Catholic religious programming from ESNE Radio. It was the first station operated, and later owned, by El Sembrador Ministries.

KHPY broadcasts in the AM expanded band. It is powered at 10,000 watts by day and 9,000 watts at night, using a directional antenna with a three-tower array. The transmitter is on San Timoteo Road at Smiley Boulevard in Redlands.

== History ==
KHPY originated as the expanded band "twin" of an existing station on the standard AM band. On March 17, 1997, the Federal Communications Commission (FCC) announced that eighty-eight stations had been given permission to move to newly available "Expanded Band" transmitting frequencies, ranging from 1610 to 1700 kHz. The original KHPY had debuted in 1989, and it was authorized to move from 1530 to 1670 kHz. A construction permit for the expanded band station was assigned the call letters KSUL on August 26, 1999.

On November 13, 2002, the KHPY call letters were transferred to the new expanded band station, and the original station on 1530 became KHPI. FCC policy was that both the original station and its expanded band counterpart could operate simultaneously for up to five years, after which owners would have to turn in one of the two licenses, depending on whether they preferred the new assignment or elected to remain on the original frequency. Therefore, on October 29, 2003, KHPI on 1530 AM was deleted.
