= WQLK =

- Richmond, Indiana; United States
- Broadcast area: Richmond, Indiana
- Frequency: 96.1 MHz (HD Radio)
- Branding: Kicks 96

Programming
- Format: Country
- Subchannels: HD1: WQLK analog HD2: Classic hits "101.7 The Point"; HD3: Classic country "95.3 The Legend"

Ownership
- Owner: Brewer Broadcasting Corp.

History
- First air date: 1960s (as WGLM)
- Former call signs: WGLM (1960s-1973)

Technical information
- Licensing authority: FCC
- Facility ID: 6749
- Class: B
- ERP: 50,000 watts
- HAAT: 150 meters (490 ft)
- Transmitter coordinates: 39°53′33″N 84°56′09″W
- Translators: 95.3 W237AT (Richmond, relays HD3); 101.7 W269BP (Richmond, relays HD2)

Links
- Public license information: Public file; LMS
- Webcast: Listen live HD2: Listen live
- Website: kicks96.com 1017thepoint.com (HD2)

WQLK (96.1 FM) is a radio station licensed to Richmond, Indiana, located at 96.1 MHz on the FM dial. WQLK broadcasts at an effective radiated power of 50,000 Watts with its studios, offices, and tower located east of US 35 on Tingler Road just north of Richmond.

== Programming ==
WQLK plays country music, mainly from the 1990s and today. It is also broadcasts Indianapolis Colts football Indiana University men's football & basketball. Indianapolis 500 & Brickyard 400

Current On Air Staff:

The Kicks Morning Crew, Sean & Dave - Sean Lamb/Dave Patrick, M-F 5am-10am

Middays - Annette Miller, M-F 10am-2pm

Afternoon Drive - Billy Elvis, M-F 2pm-7pm

The station previously broadcast Richmond High School football and boys basketball broadcasts until 2000. Those broadcasts are now on sister station, 95.3 The Legend

== History ==
WQLK is Richmond's oldest FM radio signal. The station signed on as WGLM, featuring a Jazz format. This format continued until 1970 when the station adopted a country music format. Jazz remained a fixture on the station, however. WQLK continued to broadcast a Sunday morning jazz program until 1992 when the station became "Kicks 96". By 1974, the station changed its call sign to WQLK and adopted an Easy listening format, and briefly returned to country before flip-flopping formats with its AM sister station, WHON in 1979 to become Top 40 as K-96.

Since its start in 1979, WQLK saw quite a bit of success as a Top 40. The station was mainstream from songs and surveys throughout the 1980s which had at the time become a contemporary hit radio station for the area, but what made K-96 stand out from stations in nearby Dayton, Indianapolis, and Cincinnati was that it wobbled a bit toward the Rock side of the genre for a very short period of time during the spring of 1983, despite the station mostly playing mainstream titles by surveys. The tweak gave artists such as The Police, Duran Duran, and Def Leppard more exposure than a conventional Top 40 station. However, K-96 played some pop and rhythmic music, but mainly those from bands or artists that were considered to be new wave music sometimes (as by today's standards, "Rock 40" would be termed as a Modern Rock format). The station sometimes would play songs by well-known artists at the time, such as Michael Jackson, Phil Collins, and Daryl Hall and John Oates. The Rock tweak shortly died out a couple of months later, as it brought back into its mainstream CHR formula in mid-1983, similar to WPLJ in New York City's move to CHR that year.

When 1989 rolled along, K-96 dropped CHR and became a classic hits station featuring mainly 1970s rock. The format quickly morphed into classic rock by 1990, and then album-oriented rock by the early 1990s, though mostly retaining its normal classic rock roots, such as Led Zeppelin, Boston, Fleetwood Mac, and John Mellencamp among others. The station retained the "K-96" moniker and the koala mascot throughout these format tweaks. In the spring of 1992, and with rumors of a format change in the air, their playlist began to shift slightly incorporating country songs into their playlists right alongside their normal classic rock regulars. Popular air personalities from this time period include The Captain, Jim Rhodes, The Buddha, and Mike Fox.

Finally, in July 1992, the "K-96" era of the station ended. At 5 p.m. on the Friday before the format change, the radio station began stunting with a loop of the song "Kicks" by Paul Revere & the Raiders continuously all weekend. The following Monday at 5am, morning show hosts J.R. & The Buddha fully premiered the radio station's new contemporary Country format as Kicks 96.

J.R. & The Buddha remained as the radio station's morning show until J.R. was replaced by Buzz Cannon in 1995. At this time Buzz Aldrin also took over as the station's Program Director. The Buzz & Buddha morning show remained an integral part of the station's success until Buzz's departure in 1999 . Upon Buzz's departure from the station, Buddha took over as Program Director and evening air personality Angie Fox was promoted to mornings. Buddha was replaced as Program Director in 2001 by afternoon air-personality Steve Baker who remained the station's P.D. until October 31, 2008. Baker was replaced by Phil O'Reilly on November 1, 2008. The radio station's General Manager Dave Strycker has remained the station's G.M. since 1978. Angie & The Buddha have won numerous awards from The Indiana Broadcasters Association as have Steve Baker, News Director Jeff Lane and Production Director Joe Winters.

Though the station has tweaked itself slightly over the years to include older songs and has changed their positioning statement from Hot Country Kicks 96 to The Best Country & The Most Fun, Kicks 96, their country format remains relatively the same to this day. Key air-personalities since 1993 include: Mark Brim, Buzz Cannon, The Buddha, Angie Fox, Allen Rantz, Paul Partezana, Dave McKay, Steve Baker, and Randy Klemme/Big R.

== HD Radio ==
On December 26, 2018, WQLK's HD3 subchannel changed their format from contemporary Christian to classic country, branded as "95.3 The Legend".
