= J. Edward Hakes =

American educator (born 1916)

Joseph Edward Hakes
- Born: October 22, 1916; New York, New York, U.S.
- Died: February 23, 2012 (aged 95); Baltimore, Maryland, US
- Education: Wheaton College and Northern Baptist Seminary
- Occupation: University President
- Political party: Republican
- Spouse: Lois Ruth Wyngarden
- Children: 3 sons: Jay, James, and Joseph

Joseph Edward Hakes was an American educator. He served as president of Cornerstone University (1954–1958) and academic dean of Trinity College (1969–1980). He left his mark on Christian higher education, his book being assigned as required reading in the classrooms of several Christian colleges.

Cornerstone University citation:

"In 1955, the Executive Board of the institution moved to allow the Seminary to admit only students with baccalaureate degrees, thus becoming a true graduate school of theological studies. At the same time, steps where [sic] being taken with the state Board of Education to change both the level and the function of the Bible Institute into a degree-granting, undergraduate institution. Finances and faculty did not adequately support such a transition to a four-year college at that time, but the seeds were planted during the presidency of Dr. J. Edward Hakes (1953-58)."

== Education ==
- Graduate of Wheaton College
- Graduate of Northern Baptist Seminary

== Published works ==
An Introduction to evangelical Christian education. (Chicago: Moody Press, 1964).

== Personal ==
Joseph Edward Hakes was one of two sons born to Joseph William Hakes (1888–1966) and Emily Faron. He married Lois Ruth Wyngarden. Their thre sons, Jay Hakes and James Hakes and Joseph Hakes, all are Wheaton College graduates.
