= KAFY =

- Bakersfield, California; United States
- Frequency: 1100 kHz

Programming
- Language: Spanish
- Format: Catholic

Ownership
- Owner: El Sembrador Ministries

History
- First air date: 2000

Technical information
- Licensing authority: FCC
- Facility ID: 36027
- Class: B
- Power: 4,200 watts (day); 800 watts (night)
- Transmitter coordinates: 35°27′0″N 118°56′48″W

Links
- Public license information: Public file; LMS

KAFY (1100 AM) is a radio station broadcasting a Spanish-language Catholic format. Licensed to Bakersfield, California, United States, the station is owned by El Sembrador Ministries of Los Angeles and is an affiliate of the ESNE (El Sembrador Nueva Evangelización) Network.

== History ==
KAFY signed on in 1946. In the 1960s & 1970s, KAFY was the top-rated rock station in the Bakersfield area, as well as the largest per capita in the country. At that time it was located at 550 AM. KAFY was among the several stations in California using the "Boss Radio" format, similar to KHJ in Los Angeles, KFRC in San Francisco, KGB in San Diego and KYNO in Fresno. In a business deal with Buck Owens, the owner of KUZZ (a country station), the station switched frequencies. On November 9, 2000, the station on 1100 kHz was granted the KAFY call letters.
