= WMBI-FM =

Moody Radio flagship station in Chicago

Coordinates: 41.928052°N 88.006963°W

Moody Radio Flagship Station
- Chicago, Illinois; United States
- Broadcast area: Chicago metropolitan area
- Frequency: 90.1 MHz (HD Radio)
- Branding: Moody Radio Chicago

Programming
- Format: Christian radio
- Subchannels: HD2: Majesty Radio; HD3: Radio Moody Español

Ownership
- Owner: Moody Bible Institute; (The Moody Bible Institute of Chicago)

History
- First air date: July 25, 1960
- Call sign meaning: Moody Bible Institute

Technical information
- Licensing authority: FCC
- Facility ID: 66063
- Class: B
- ERP: 100,000 watts
- HAAT: 135 meters (443 ft)

Links
- Public license information: Public file; LMS
- Webcast: Listen live
- Website: www.moodyradio.org/stations/chicago/

WMBI-FM (90.1 MHz) is a radio station broadcasting in Chicago, Illinois. WMBI-FM is owned and operated by the Moody Bible Institute and broadcasts from their campus in downtown Chicago, and transmitter facilities are located in Addison.

== Programming ==
WMBI-FM is the flagship station of Moody Radio. Moody Radio owns and operates 37 stations around the country and the network provides programming to almost 700 affiliates around the country. WMBI-FM's format consists of Christian talk and teaching and Christian music. A local morning show called "Karl and Crew Mornings" with Karl Clauson. In addition to local programming, WMBI-FM carries a variety of talk shows originating at Moody Radio in Chicago including "Equipped with. Chris Brooks", "Chris Fabry Live!" with Chris Fabry, "MoneyWise Live" with Rob West and "In the Market" with Janet Parshall.

== History ==
The station began broadcasting July 25, 1960, and originally simulcast the programming of its sister station WMBI AM 1110. The station originally had an ERP of 44,000 watts at a HAAT of 450 feet. The station's ERP was increased to 49,700 watts in 1963, and in 1972 its ERP was increased to 100,000 watts at a HAAT of 441 feet.

Moody Bible Institute also operated an earlier FM station, which began broadcasting experimentally September 5, 1941, and was the country's first non-commercial FM station. The station originally operated at 47.5 MHz, and held the call sign W75C. In 1943, the station's call sign was changed to WDLM, standing for D. L. Moody. By 1948, the station's frequency was changed to 95.5 MHz and its call sign was changed to WMBI-FM. In Summer 1952, the station was granted authority to remain silent, and on December 23, 1952 its license was cancelled.

== See also ==
- Moody Radio
- WXES
