= WDLM (AM) =

East Moline, Illinois; United States
- Broadcast area: Quad Cities
- Frequency: 960 kHz
- Branding: Moody Radio Quad Cities

Programming
- Language: English
- Format: Christian radio
- Affiliations: Moody Radio

Ownership
- Owner: Moody Bible Institute; (The Moody Bible Institute of Chicago)
- Sister stations: WDLM-FM

History
- First air date: 1960
- Call sign meaning: Dwight Lyman Moody (founder of the Moody Bible Institute)

Technical information
- Licensing authority: FCC
- Facility ID: 66005
- Class: D
- Power: 520 watts day; 20 watts night
- Transmitter coordinates: 41°24′57.12″N 90°23′57.47″W

Links
- Public license information: Public file; LMS
- Website: www.moodyradioqc.fm

WDLM (960 AM) is a non-commercial radio station licensed to East Moline, Illinois, and serving the Quad Cities area with a Christian radio format simulcasting WDLM-FM 89.3. The station broadcasts at a power of 520 watts during daylight hours and 20 watts during nighttime hours. WDLM's studio and transmitter are located on E200th Street in rural Henry County, Illinois, just outside Coal Valley. Sister station WDLM-FM 89.3 also has its studio at this location. Both WDLM and WDLM-FM are O&O's of their parent network, the Moody Radio Network, which is owned by the Moody Bible Institute of Chicago. In 2019, Moody announced it intends to sell the station.
