= Moody Radio =

Christian radio network in the United States

- Type: Radio network
- Country: United States

Ownership
- Owner: Moody Bible Institute
- Key people: Wes Ward (Vice President of Broadcasting) Collin G. Lambert (Former Vice President of Broadcasting), Doug Hastings (Former Vice President of Broadcasting)

Coverage
- Availability: United States

Links
- Website: moodyradio.org

Moody Radio is one of the largest Christian radio networks in the United States. Located in downtown Chicago, Moody Radio has 56 owned and operated stations and translators and hundreds of affiliates and outlets that carry all or part of its programming. It is owned by the Moody Bible Institute.

The network offers programming for a Christian audience, including local drives, teaching, national talk, and Christian music.

== History ==
WMBI, the flagship station of Moody Radio, got its start seemingly by accident. A violent storm in October 1925 prevented the talent for WGES's scheduled broadcast from performing that day. This opened the door for two cornet-playing Moody Bible Institute students, who happened to be on-site and could fill the time slot. Few would have thought this "chance-encounter" would result in a weekly show and less than a year later help to launch WMBI, the first noncommercial educational and religious radio station. Despite changing technology, audiences and formats, the station maintained a familiar presence on the air for over eight decades.

In 1958, MBI expanded into a network when it purchased WCRF in Cleveland, Ohio, and shortly thereafter, WDLM in Moline, Illinois. These purchases were the catalyst for a network that would grow to include 36 stations in the continental U.S., primarily in the South and Midwest. By the end of the 1960s, the network's potential audience had increased to 30 million listeners. In January 1980, WDLM-FM signed on the air as the 11th station operated by Moody Radio. In 1982, Moody Radio began a satellite-fed network enabling communications across America.

In 2019, Moody Radio put three of its AM stations up for sale. The company announced that the proceeds from the sale would be put towards furthering the expansion of Moody Radio with added digital and online content in both English and Spanish.

== Programs ==
Moody Radio provides biblical programming 24 hours a day. Some of the most popular and award-winning programs include: Equipped with Chris Brooks, Chris Fabry Live!, In the Market with Janet Parshall, and Open Line with Dr. Michael Rydelnik. From 11pm CT until 5am CT, Music Thru the Night is broadcast. From 1982 until his retirement in 2014, Mike Kellogg hosted the program. It is currently hosted by Bill Maier.

== Owned & operated stations ==
The following stations are owned and operated by Moody Radio.

=== Full-powered stations ===
Call sign	Frequency	City of license	State	FCC info
WMBV	91.9 FM	Dixons Mills	Alabama	FCC (WMBV)
WRNF	89.5 FM	Selma	Alabama	FCC (WRNF)
WMFT	88.9 FM	Tuscaloosa	Alabama	FCC (WMFT)
WRMB	89.3 FM	Boynton Beach	Florida	FCC (WRMB)
WHGN	91.9 FM	Crystal River	Florida	FCC (WHGN)
WKES	91.1 FM	Lakeland	Florida	FCC (WKES)
WSOR	90.9 FM	Naples	Florida	FCC (WSOR)
WKZM	104.3 FM	Sarasota	Florida	FCC (WKZM)
WMBI-FM (Note: Flagship station)	90.1 FM	Chicago	Illinois	FCC (WMBI-FM)
WDLM	960 AM	East Moline	Illinois	FCC (WDLM)
WDLM-FM	89.3 FM	East Moline	Illinois	FCC (WDLM-FM)
WGNR	1470 AM	Anderson	Indiana	FCC (WGNR)
WGNR-FM	97.9 FM	Anderson	Indiana	FCC (WGNR-FM)
WFOF	90.3 FM	Covington	Indiana	FCC (WFOF)
WIWC	91.7 FM	Kokomo	Indiana	FCC (WIWC)
WMBL	88.1 FM	Mitchell	Indiana	FCC (WMBL)
WHPL	89.9 FM	West Lafayette	Indiana	FCC (WHPL)
WJSO	90.1 FM	Pikeville	Kentucky	FCC (WJSO)
WGNB	89.3 FM	Zeeland	Michigan	FCC (WGNB)
WMBU	89.1 FM	Forest	Mississippi	FCC (WMBU)
KSPL	90.9 FM	Kalispell	Montana	FCC (KSPL)
KMBN	89.7 FM	Las Cruces	New Mexico	FCC (KMBN)
WVMU	91.7 FM	Ashtabula	Ohio	FCC (WVMU)
WCRF-FM	103.3 FM	Cleveland	Ohio	FCC (WCRF-FM)
WVML	90.5 FM	Millersburg	Ohio	FCC (WVML)
WVMS	89.5 FM	Sandusky	Ohio	FCC (WVMS)
WVME	91.9 FM	Meadville	Pennsylvania	FCC (WVME)
WVMN	90.1 FM	New Castle	Pennsylvania	FCC (WVMN)
WCDC	950 AM	Moncks Corner	South Carolina	FCC (WCDC)
WMBW	88.9 FM	Chattanooga	Tennessee	FCC (WMBW)
WMKW	89.3 FM	Crossville	Tennessee	FCC (WMKW)
WFCM-FM	91.7 FM	Murfreesboro	Tennessee	FCC (WFCM-FM)
KMLW	88.3 FM	Moses Lake	Washington	FCC (KMLW)
KMBI-FM	107.9 FM	Spokane	Washington	FCC (KMBI-FM)

=== Translators ===
Call sign	Frequency (MHz)	City of license	State	FCC info
K203CH	88.5	Juneau	Alaska	FCC (K203CH)
K216FX	91.1	Mena	Arkansas	FCC (K216FX)
W263AH	100.5	Fort Pierce	Florida	FCC (W263AH)
W208BZ	89.5	Okeechobee	Florida	FCC (W208BZ)
W212AC	90.3	Stuart	Florida	FCC (W212AC)
K220EO	91.9	Hilo	Hawaii	FCC (K220EO)
W211AQ	90.1	Freeport	Illinois	FCC (W211AQ)
W210AV	89.9	Mitchell	Indiana	FCC (W210AV)
K214BC	90.7	Burlington	Iowa	FCC (K214BC)
K208EF	89.5	Missoula	Montana	FCC (K208EF)
K203FE	88.5	Tahlequah	Oklahoma	FCC (K203FE)
K234AD	94.7	Enterprise	Oregon	FCC (K234AD)
W299CY	107.7	Charleston	South Carolina	FCC (W299CY)
K261CH	100.1	Carpenter	South Dakota	FCC (K261CH)
K211FQ	90.1	Gettysburg	South Dakota	FCC (K211FQ)
K213CL	90.5	Huron	South Dakota	FCC (K213CL)
K208FM	89.5	Pierre	South Dakota	FCC (K208FM)
W217CD	91.3	Dyersburg	Tennessee	FCC (W217CD)
W211CD	90.1	Johnson City	Tennessee	FCC (W211CD)
W254CK	98.7	Nashville	Tennessee	FCC (W254CK)
K215AD	90.9	Chelan	Washington	FCC (K215AD)
K264BF	100.7	Wenatchee	Washington	FCC (K264BF)
