= WHON =

Coordinates: 39°53′32″N 84°56′08″W

Centerville, Indiana; United States
- Broadcast area: Richmond, Indiana; Connersville, Indiana; Centerville, Indiana
- Frequency: 930 kHz
- Branding: 101.7 The Point

Programming
- Format: Defunct (was Classic hits)

Ownership
- Owner: Brewer Broadcasting Corporation

History
- First air date: August 19, 1964

Technical information
- Licensing authority: FCC
- Facility ID: 6746
- Class: D
- Power: 500 watts day 114 watts night
- Translator: 101.7 W269BP (Richmond)

Links
- Public license information: Public file; LMS
- Webcast: Listen Live
- Website: 1017thepoint.com

WHON 930 AM was a radio station broadcasting a classic hits format. Licensed to Centerville, Indiana, United States, the station served the Richmond area and was last owned by Brewer Broadcasting Corporation.

WHON was also heard locally in Richmond through an FM translator.

WHON's license was cancelled on August 11, 2021. Due to that, W269BP switched to simulcasting WQLK HD2.

Call sign	Frequency	City of license	FID	ERP (W)	Class	FCC info
W269BP	101.7 FM	Richmond, Indiana	148424	250	D	LMS
