= WXXC =

Coordinates: 40.598°N 85.656°W

- Marion, Indiana; United States
- Broadcast area: Muncie-Marion
- Frequency: 106.9 MHz
- Branding: Star 106.9

Programming
- Format: Christian CCM
- Affiliations: Taylor University Broadcasting Inc.

Ownership
- Owner: Taylor University Broadcasting Inc.
- Sister stations: WCJC, WRNP

History
- First air date: 1948
- Former call signs: WMRI-FM (1948–1970); WMRI (1970–2006); WMRI-FM (2006); WXXC
- Call sign meaning: Previous "Double X" branding

Technical information
- Licensing authority: FCC
- Facility ID: 6338
- Class: B
- ERP: 50,000 watts
- HAAT: 152 meters (499 ft)

Links
- Public license information: Public file; LMS
- Webcast: Listen live
- Website: star1069fm.com

WXXC (106.9 FM) is a 50,000 watt Class B radio station licensed to Marion, Indiana, and serving the Muncie-Marion Arbitron market. Studios and offices are located at 1115 W. Rudisill Blvd. Fort Wayne, IN 46807. The station features a religious CCM format. The station is owned by Taylor University Broadcasting.

== History ==
The station signed on in 1948 as WMRI-FM. In the 1990s, WMRI was owned by Bomar Broadcasting, which made WMRI the flagship station of their mini-network of easy listening stations throughout Indiana. Stations in this network included WLEZ (now WBOW) Terre Haute, WEZV (now WBPE) in Lafayette, and WYEZ (now WHPZ) in South Bend. WYEZ was the first network station sold and went to LeSEA Broadcasting. WEZV was sold in 1998 to Artistic Media Partners, and WLEZ was sold to Crossroads Communications in the early 2000s. Bomar sold WMRI shortly thereafter to Mid-America Radio, owners of crosstown country outlet WCJC and oldies WBAT, (now Hoosier AM/FM, LLC).

In 2026, Taylor University Broadcasting Inc. purchased the station and simulcasts its programming of religious CCM music from its 90.3 FM station based in Fort Wayne, IN.

Previous logo

== Programming ==
WXXC simulcasts programming from 90.3 fm in Fort Wayne, IN. It broadcasts religious Contemporary Christian Music.
