= WCDC (AM) =

- Moncks Corner, South Carolina; United States
- Broadcast area: Charleston metropolitan area
- Frequency: 950 kHz
- Branding: Moody Radio Charleston

Programming
- Format: Christian radio
- Network: Moody Radio

Ownership
- Owner: The Moody Bible Institute of Chicago

History
- First air date: December 1963
- Former call signs: WBER (1963–1984); WMCJ (1984–2001); WWJK (2001–2003); WQTK (2003–2006); WJKB (2006–2018)

Technical information
- Licensing authority: FCC
- Facility ID: 4817
- Class: B
- Power: 10,000 watts (day); 6,000 watts (night)
- Transmitter coordinates: 33°12′20″N 80°3′54″W
- Translator: 107.7 W299CY (Charleston)

Links
- Public license information: Public file; LMS
- Webcast: Listen live
- Website: www.moodyradio.org/stations/charleston/

WCDC (950 AM) is an noncommercial radio station licensed to Moncks Corner, South Carolina, United States, and serves the Charleston metropolitan area. It carries a Christian radio format, owned and operated by Moody Radio via The Moody Bible Institute of Chicago.

WCDC programming is also heard on low-power FM translator W299CY on 107.7 MHz.

== History ==
The station signed on the air in December 1963. The original call sign was WBER. It was a 500-watt daytimer station, required to go off the air at night. In 1967, it was acquired by the Berkeley Broadcasting Company and it aired a country music format. WCDC formerly aired the Clemson University Tigers and NASCAR races.

On September 13, 2010, as WJKB, the format changed from Dial Global's classic country music service to sports radio. In March 2013, the station flipped to conservative talk. In December 2016, the station switched to an urban gospel format, simulcasting WJNI. On July 30, 2019, the station changed to Christian talk and teaching from the Moody Radio Network, after being acquired by The Moody Bible Institute of Chicago.
