= Cornerstone University =

Christian university in Grand Rapids, Michigan, US

Coordinates: 42°58′46″N 85°35′35″W

- Former names: Baptist Bible Institute (1941–1963); Grand Rapids Baptist Bible College and Seminary (1963–1994); Cornerstone College and Grand Rapids Baptist Seminary (1994–1999)
- Type: Private university
- Established: 1941; 85 years ago
- Affiliations: Council for Christian Colleges and Universities
- Religious affiliation: Interdenominational (Evangelical Christian); General Association of Regular Baptist Churches (formerly)
- Endowment: $17.8 million (2025)
- President: Gerson Moreno-Riaño
- Faculty: 118
- Students: 1735 (2024)
- Location: Grand Rapids, Michigan, United States
- Campus: 130 acres, suburban
- Colors: Navy Blue & Vegas Gold
- Nickname: Golden Eagles
- Sporting affiliations: NAIA – WHAC
- Mascot: Golden Eagle
- Website: www.cornerstone.edu

Cornerstone University is a private evangelical Christian university in Grand Rapids, Michigan, United States.

Cornerstone University has undergraduate and graduate programs, two seminaries (Grand Rapids Theological Seminary and Asia Biblical Theological Seminary based in Chiang Mai, Thailand), and a radio division called Cornerstone Radio (WCSG, WNHG, & Mission Network News). The university offers 60 academic programs in the arts, sciences, humanities, Bible, teacher education, computers, business, and journalism. The university maintains Mission Network News (MNN), an evangelical "broadcast ministry". As of 2020, Cornerstone had an enrollment of 1,998 students, including professional and graduate studies and both seminaries.

The university is accredited by the Higher Learning Commission, the Association of Theological Schools in the United States and Canada, and the National Association of Schools of Music. Cornerstone's social work program is accredited by the Council on Social Work Education.

Cornerstone University now offers many different certificates, minors, Associate degrees, Bachelor's degrees, Master's degrees and an online doctorate degree. Cornerstone also offers online programs, such as SOAR, a mobile app intended for adults to earn a business degree.

Students are required to abide by a "Lifestyle Statement" intended to reflect Trinitarianism. For example, the 2023-24 handbook states: "Members of the Cornerstone community are expected to commit to sexual purity – appropriately reflected in either celibacy or heterosexual monogamous marriage. Premarital sexual activity, extramarital sexual activity, and romantic relationships between members of the same gender breach this commitment and are not permitted"

== History ==
Cornerstone was founded in 1941 as the Baptist Bible Institute by the General Association of Regular Baptist Churches as an evening school. The first class graduated in 1944, and the first degree was conferred in 1947. It was accredited in 1963 as a four-year degree-granting college and renamed Grand Rapids Baptist Bible College and Seminary. WCSG began broadcasting in June 1973 with an easy listening and fine arts format. In 1993, it absorbed the Grand Rapids School of Bible and Music.

On July 1, 1999, following approval by the State of Michigan, Cornerstone College and Grand Rapids Baptist Seminary became Cornerstone University. In June 2003, the graduate theological school became Grand Rapids Theological Seminary.

In the 1990s and early 2000s, Cornerstone University expanded and transformed, changing its name, becoming a university, increasing enrollment, adding facilities and improving the campus, introducing an adult program, including the MBA and a leadership development experience, adding an Honors Program and "Civitas" Core Curriculum, changing its mascot, colors, and logo.

=== Presidents ===
- David Otis Fuller (1941–1944)
- Norman F. Douty (1944–1945)
- Paul Jackson (1945–1946) (acting president)
- Gerard Knol (1946–1953)
- Leon J. Wood (1953–1954) (acting president)
- J. Edward Hakes (1954–1958)
- Howard A. Keithley (1958–1959) (acting president)
- W. Wilbert Welch (1959–1983) (Chancellor, 1983–2015)
- Charles U. Wagner (1983–1990)
- W. Wilbert Welch (1991) (interim president)
- Rex M. Rogers (1991–2008)
- Joseph M. Stowell, III (2008–2021)
- Gerson Moreno-Riaño (2021–)

== Campus ==
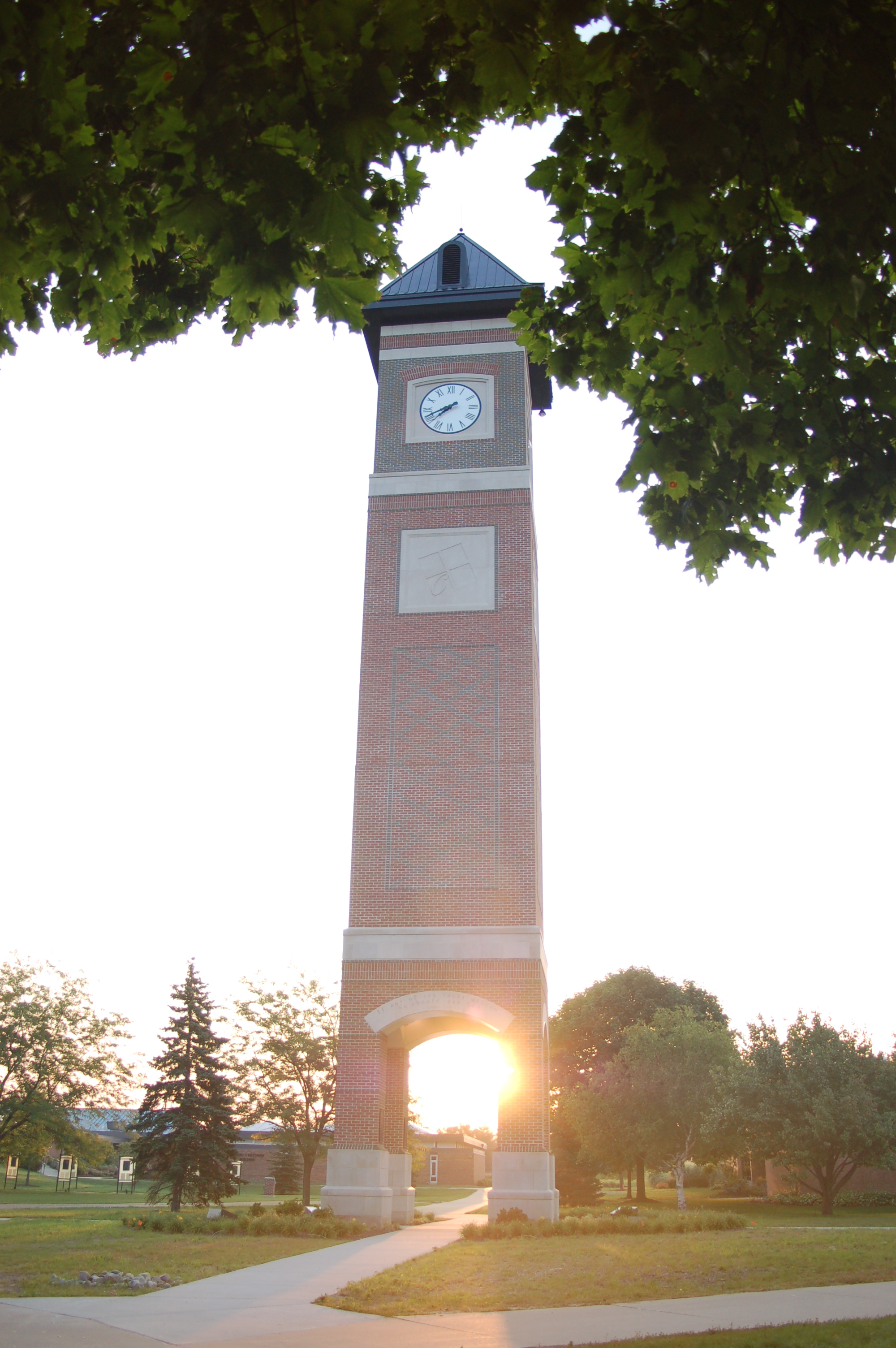
The Welch Tower

On October 7, 2006, the W. Wilbert and Meryl Welch Tower was dedicated during Cornerstone's 2006 Homecoming. The clock tower has a four faced clock near its top. The tower stands 110 feet (34 m) tall, and also has a WOOD-TV traffic camera on the southeast side of the tower. The clock tower is located between the Gainey Conference Center and Bolthouse Hall on campus.

== Athletics ==
The Cornerstone athletic teams are called the Golden Eagles. The university is a member of the National Association of Intercollegiate Athletics (NAIA), primarily competing in the Wolverine–Hoosier Athletic Conference (WHAC) since the 1992–93 academic year.

Cornerstone competes in 20 intercollegiate varsity sports: Men's sports include baseball, basketball, cross country, golf, soccer, track & field, volleyball and wrestling; while women's sports include basketball, cheerleading, cross country, golf, soccer, softball, track & field and volleyball.

The official mascot is Rocky the Golden Eagle. The baseball team's honorary mascot is Buster the Bulldog.

Cornerstone has won the NAIA Men's Basketball Championships (Division II) in 1999, 2011 and 2015.

== Notable alumni ==
- Beth Bombara, singer-songwriter
- Andy Bronkema, basketball coach
- Jeff Dresser, soccer player
- Stephen Herdsman, soccer player
- Lisa Kelly, trucker
- Scot McKnight, New Testament scholar, historian, and theologian
- Reid Ribble, former U.S. congressional Representative
- Derek Scott, distance runner and coach
- Steven Waterhouse, pastor and Bible teacher
- Jordan Wilson, soccer player
- Kristopher Karolkiewicz, perpetrator of the 2026 Karolkiewicz family murders
