= WGNR-FM =

Moody Radio station in Anderson, Indiana

- Anderson, Indiana; United States
- Broadcast area: Indianapolis metropolitan area
- Frequency: 97.9 MHz
- Branding: Moody Radio

Programming
- Format: Christian talk and teaching
- Affiliations: Moody Radio

Ownership
- Owner: Moody Bible Institute; (The Moody Bible Institute of Chicago)
- Sister stations: WGNR

History
- First air date: September 11, 1973; 52 years ago
- Former call signs: WLHN (1973–1991); WXXP (1991–1998)

Technical information
- Licensing authority: FCC
- Facility ID: 2215
- Class: B
- ERP: 50,000 watts
- HAAT: 149 meters (489 ft)
- Transmitter coordinates: 40°03′43.00″N 85°42′34.00″W

Links
- Public license information: Public file; LMS
- Webcast: Listen Live
- Website: Official website

WGNR-FM (97.9 MHz) is a non-commercial FM radio station licensed to Anderson, Indiana, serving part of the Indianapolis metropolitan area. It airs a Christian talk and teaching radio format and is an owned and operated by Moody Radio, based in Chicago. WGNR-FM holds periodic on-air fundraisers to support the station operations.

WGNR-FM has an effective radiated power (ERP) of 50,000 watts. The transmitter is on West 53rd Street in Anderson, near Martin Luther King Jr. Boulevard.

== History ==
On September 11, 1973, the station signed on with the call sign WLHN. It was co-owned with WHUT 1470 AM (now WGNR). WLHN aired a middle of the road (MOR) format and was owned by Civic Broadcasting Corporation.

In 1985, WLHN and WHUT were sold to Patch-Dunn & Associates for $2,276,000, and in 1987 they were sold to Jon Mark Lamey for $3,395,000.

WLHN aired an adult contemporary format in the 1980s and 1990s. In 1991, its call sign was changed to WXXP. It continued to air an adult contemporary format, and was branded "Experience 98".

In December 1997, the station was sold to the Moody Bible Institute, along with 1470 WHUT, for $5.5 million. The FM station adopted a Christian format. The AM station flipped to Spanish-language Christian radio. In January 1998, the FM station's call sign was changed to WGNR-FM.
