= Cornerstone Radio =

Cornerstone Radio is a broadcast outreach ministry of Cornerstone University of Grand Rapids, Michigan, which consists of four stations, each carrying separate programming:

== His Kids Radio ==
His Kids Radio started as a subscription-only SCA-based radio station broadcast via WCSG. The service broadcasts original Christian children's programming, such as a live phone-in show on Saturday mornings, as well as syndicated programs like Moody Bible Institute's The Sugar Creek Gang and Focus on the Family's Adventures in Odyssey. When the station was not airing special programs it would play Christian children's music, most of which was from Christian children's artists and musicals. "Night Light" was a six-hour period from midnight to 6:00 a.m. where the station played soothing instrumentals punctuated by comforting narratives of Bible verses. Special SCA / FM receivers were required to receive the programming; they were available from local churches and direct from WCSG for an initial receiver fee plus a programming fee of $14.99 per month. its programs can also be heard on stations across the United States, as well as the Sky Angel satellite service on channel 9750, and online at their official website.

In 2005, when His Kids Radio began streaming their broadcast online at their website, they also began offering Moody Wi-Fi Family Radios, which are specially programmed radios that connect to the Internet via a Wi-Fi network and stream His Kids Radio (or other Internet streams, via programmable buttons on the radio). At this time, His Kids Radio discontinued the SCA/FM receiver program and Sky Angel satellite programs in favor of the Wi-Fi radios.

When the Great Recession began in 2009, Cornerstone University Radio was forced to cut most of the funding from His Kids Radio, and the remaining funds only allowed for maintenance of the stream, website, and weekly programming updates. It ran in this "jukebox" mode for five years, when a plan was drawn up to revive His Kids Radio.

As of October 23, 2014, His Kids Radio was officially transferred to Keys for Kids Ministries in Grand Rapids, Michigan, and renamed Keys for Kids Radio. While retaining much of the long-form programming such as Adventures in Odyssey and Red Rock Mysteries, the music received an updated sound.

== Mission Network News ==
Mission Network News (MNN) reports on the work on mission agencies and relief organizations around the world. The service is heard on over 800 radio stations worldwide, and via shortwave to Europe, Africa, the Americas and the South Pacific, as well as on the Internet.
