= WNHG =

Radio station in Grand Rapids, Michigan

Coordinates: 42.978°N 85.596°W

- Grand Rapids, Michigan; United States
- Frequency: 89.7 MHz
- Branding: Strong Tower Radio

Programming
- Format: Christian radio
- Affiliations: Strong Tower Radio

Ownership
- Owner: West Central Michigan Media Ministries

History
- First air date: May 18, 1978 (as WEHB)
- Former call signs: WEHB (1978–1991); WBYW (1991–1998); WAYG (1998–2013); WCXG (2013–2016)
- Former frequencies: 89.9 MHz (196?-2015)
- Call sign meaning: W-Near to the Heart of God

Technical information
- Licensing authority: FCC
- Facility ID: 24772
- Class: A
- ERP: 3,200 watts
- HAAT: 74 meters

Links
- Public license information: Public file; LMS
- Webcast: Listen Live
- Website: Strong Tower Radio

WNHG 89.7 FM is a radio station in Grand Rapids, Michigan, broadcasting a Christian radio programming format as a simulcast of WGCP 91.9 FM in Cadillac, Michigan. Both WGCP and WNHG are owned and operated by West Central Michigan Media Ministries.

== History ==
The 89.9 frequency the station was originally transmitting on was used by WEHB (East Hills Broadcasters) for a number of years, broadcasting (in mono) from a tower on the Aquinas College campus, with studios above the Intersection Bar. WEHB later moved to the original D.A. Bloggett Home For Children on Cherry Street. WEHB was an eclectic locally programmed station, with an emphasis on jazz. The station broadcast circa 1977–1991, becoming "World Music" WBYW from 1991 to 1998 from a new tower atop the Plainfield Water Tower on East Beltline Ave in northeast Grand Rapids.

=== Way-FM ===
Former logo

From February 1999 until November 29, 2013, the station broadcast a Christian CHR/Top 40 format as WaY FM. WCXG's programming was repeated on WAYK 88.3 FM (now WCXK) in Kalamazoo and WAYO 89.9 FM (now WCXB) in Benton Harbor. The program was a part of Cornerstone Radio, a broadcast outreach ministry of Cornerstone University.

WaYFM targeted teens, young adults, and young families with modern music wrapped in a Christian worldview. Popular artists played on the station included Switchfoot, The Fray, Relient K, GRITS, Hawk Nelson, tobyMac, BarlowGirl, Daughtry, Casting Crowns, Family Force 5, Stacie Orrico, Skillet, and other various hip hop, pop, rock, and punk acts. WaY-FM consistently pulled strong ratings among teens (#2), young adults, and even persons and women 25-49 (usually placing in the top 5 or top 3 in these demos).

WaYfm is not to be confused with WAY-FM Network, the nationally syndicated Christian CHR network. Ironically, WaYfm's competitor station in the Grand Rapids market, the commercial WJQK 99.3 FM, previously aired some programming from the national WAY-FM network, notably the afternoon drive show "Total Axxess."

WaYfm started in Kalamazoo in 1996 when Cornerstone purchased a construction permit from Grand Valley State University for 88.3 FM. After deciding on the Christian CHR format, the management of the station opted to use CHRSN's programming until local listenership and financial support allowed them to program locally.

88.3 WAYK signed on at 5p.m. on February 3, 1997, to serve Kalamazoo and Battle Creek. A signal was added at 89.9 in Grand Rapids in late 1998, originating not too far from Cornerstone University.

Despite not being able to adequately cover areas to the southwest of Grand Rapids (due to a directional pattern designed to protect Hope College's student station, WTHS, a station in Holland, Michigan that also airs at 89.9 FM), recent Arbitron ratings for the former WaY FM format placed the station at #2 among all stations in the market with teens, and tied for 3rd place among females 12-24 (the station's core audience).

Cornerstone University announced in October 2013 that the WaYfm network would cease operations on November 29, 2013. The 88.3 and 89.9 signals on that day began to simulcast sister station WCSG 91.3, and also changed call letters.

=== Frequency change ===
In August 2015, the station moved the frequency to 89.7 and began to transmit in a non-directional pattern. Additionally, the power was reduced to 3,200 watts, while increasing the tower height from 63 meters to 74 meters to compensate for the power reduction. This resolves the long-standing issue with needing to protect WTHS at 89.9 FM. On June 14, 2016, the station changed its call sign to WNHG. On July 5, 2016, at 4:00 PM EDT, The Strong Tower Radio broadcast started. WNHG is also affiliated with 3ABN Radio.
