= WGNR (AM) =

Anderson, Indiana; United States
- Frequency: 1470 kHz
- Branding: Radio Moody

Programming
- Language: Spanish
- Format: Christian
- Affiliations: Moody Radio

Ownership
- Owner: Moody Bible Institute; (The Moody Bible Institute of Chicago)
- Sister stations: WGNR-FM

History
- First air date: 1946; 80 years ago
- Former call signs: WCBC (1946–1960); WERX (1960); WHUT (1960–1998); WGNR (1998–2022); WRPU (2022–2024)

Technical information
- Licensing authority: FCC
- Facility ID: 2214
- Class: D
- Power: 1,000 watts day 36 watts night
- Transmitter coordinates: 40°03′43″N 85°42′37″W

Links
- Public license information: Public file; LMS
- Webcast: Listen Live
- Website: Official website

WGNR (1470 AM) is radio station licensed to Anderson, Indiana. It airs a Spanish language Christian format and is an owned and operated affiliate of Moody Radio.

== History ==
The station began broadcasting in 1946 and held the call sign WCBC. It ran 1,000 watts during daytime hours only and was owned by Civic Broadcasting Corporation. In 1960, the station was sold to Radio WBOW, Inc. for $185,000. In September 1960, its call sign was changed to WERX. It was changed to WHUT the following month. In 1970, the station was sold to Eastern Broadcasting Company for $650,000.

From the late 1960s until the early 1980s, the station aired a contemporary hits format. By 1984, it had adopted an adult standards format. In 1985, the station was sold to Patch-Dunn & Associates, along with 97.9 WLHN, for $2,276,000, and in 1987 it was sold to Jon Mark Lamey, along with 97.9 WLHN, for $3,395,000. In December 1997, the station was sold to the Moody Bible Institute, along with 97.9 WXXP, for $5.5 million and it adopted a Christian format. In January 1998, its call sign was changed to WGNR. In 2019, Moody announced it intended to sell the station.

In 2020, Moody filed to sell the station and associated translator to Radio Punjab AM 1470 LLC for $129,000. In January 2022, the owners-to-be selected the call sign WRPU for when the sale closed; the call sign change was approved before closure and, while still carrying Moody programming, the station adopted the new call sign on February 22.

In 2023, Radio Punjab donated WRPU back to Moody; the donation was consummated on March 22, 2024. On April 1, 2024, the station changed its call sign back to WGNR.
