= WXES =

- Chicago, Illinois; United States
- Frequency: 1110 kHz

Programming
- Language: Spanish
- Format: Catholic radio
- Network: ESNE Radio

Ownership
- Owner: El Sembrador Ministries

History
- First air date: July 28, 1926
- Former call signs: WMBI (1926–2021)
- Former frequencies: 1080 kHz (1928–1941)
- Call sign meaning: "El Sembrador" (The Sower)

Technical information
- Licensing authority: FCC
- Facility ID: 65972
- Class: D
- Power: 4,200 watts (days only)
- Transmitter coordinates: 41°55′41″N 88°0′25″W

Links
- Public license information: Public file; LMS
- Website: esneradio.com/chicago-1110am/

WXES (1110 AM) is a noncommercial radio station licensed to Chicago, Illinois, United States, that operates during the daytime hours only. It carries Spanish-language Catholic programming, owned and operated by ESNE Radio via El Sembrador Ministries.

The station's transmitter is off North Palazzo Drive near West Moorland Avenue in Addison, Illinois.

== History ==
The station signed on the air on July 28, 1926. Its original call sign was WMBI, which stood for the Moody Bible Institute. The station originally broadcast at 1080 kHz, sharing time with WCBD. WMBI's frequency was changed to 1110 kHz in March 1941, as a result of the North American Regional Broadcasting Agreement (NARBA). For 95 years, the station was operated by Moody Bible, originally broadcasting English-language Christian programming.

For decades, WMBI, like many major Chicago stations, could be heard in much of West Michigan; indeed, it had substantial listenership in that region, as far east as Grand Rapids. However, as more stations signed on in West Michigan, WMBI was crowded out.

In 1960, Moody Bible added an FM station at 90.1 MHz, WMBI-FM. At first, the two stations simulcast their programming, but over time the FM station developed its own programming. WMBI 1110 switched to a Spanish-language Christian format on February 6, 2012, making it the first full-time format of its kind on analog radio in Chicago. In 2019, Moody announced it intended to sell the station.

In 2021, El Sembrador Ministries acquired 1110 WMBI and a permit for an FM translator, W292GB at 106.3 FM. The price tag was $1.6 million. ESNE Radio already aired part-time on WNDZ in Portage, Indiana. The transaction was consummated on July 13, 2021. On July 19, the station's call sign was changed to WXES.
