= WNAP-FM =

Radio station in Morristown, Indiana

- Morristown, Indiana; United States
- Frequency: 88.1 MHz

Programming
- Format: Oldies

Ownership
- Owner: New Beginnings Movement, Inc.

History
- First air date: 2000; 26 years ago
- Former call signs: WJCF (2000–2008); WJCF-FM (2008–2019); WNPP (2019)

Technical information
- Licensing authority: FCC
- Facility ID: 91193
- Class: A
- ERP: 2,700 watts
- HAAT: 46 meters (151 ft)
- Transmitter coordinates: 39°45′1″N 85°33′19″W

Links
- Public license information: Public file; LMS
- Webcast: Live

WNAP-FM (88.1 FM) is a radio station licensed to serve Morristown, Indiana, United States. The station is owned by New Beginnings Movement, Inc. The studios are in a house in Muncie, Indiana.

WNAP-FM broadcasts an oldies format.

== Translators ==
WNAP-FM programming is also carried on a network of broadcast translator stations to extend or improve the coverage area of the station.

Broadcast translator for WNAP-FM
Call sign	Frequency	City of license	FID	ERP (W)	Class	FCC info
W268BJ	101.5 FM	Muncie, Indiana	138137	250	D	LMS
W219DO	91.7 FM	Edinburgh, Indiana	143690	19	D	LMS
