= WBAA =

Radio station in West Lafayette, Indiana

WBAA and WBAA-FM
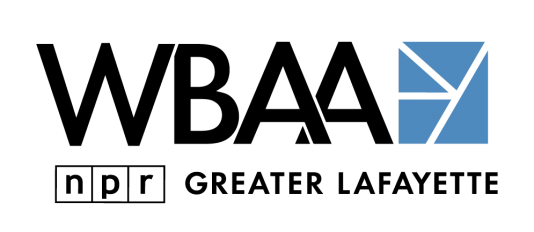

West Lafayette, Indiana; United States
- Broadcast area: Lafayette metropolitan area
- Frequencies: WBAA: 920 kHz (HD Radio); WBAA-FM: 101.3 MHz (HD Radio)
- Branding: WBAA News

Programming
- Language(s): English
- Format: Public radio
- Subchannels: WBAA-FM: HD2: Classical music; HD3: Jazz
- Affiliations: NPR, Classical Music Indy

Ownership
- Owner: Metropolitan Indianapolis Public Media, Inc.

History
- Founded: WBAA: 1919 as experimental station 9YB
- First air date: WBAA: April 4, 1922 (Note: The station's first licensed broadcast was made April 21, but April 4—the day it was licensed—has long been regarded by Purdue as its starting date.); WBAA-FM: February 1, 1993
- Former call signs: WBAA-FM: WFUC (1991, CP) (Note: This was a sequential assignment; the FCC also had assigned WFUA, WFUB, and WFUD to stations at that time.)
- Call sign meaning: none, sequentially assigned

Technical information
- Licensing authority: FCC
- Facility ID: WBAA: 53946; WBAA-FM: 53947
- Class: WBAA: B; WBAA-FM: B1
- Power: WBAA: 5,000 watts (day); 1,000 watts (night)
- ERP: WBAA-FM: 14,000 watts
- HAAT: WBAA-FM: 120 meters (390 ft)
- Transmitter coordinates: WBAA: 40°20′29″N 86°53′01″W; WBAA-FM: 40°17′50″N 86°54′05″W
- Translator(s): WBAA-HD2: 105.9 W290CM (Lafayette)

Links
- Public license information: WBAA: Public file; LMS; WBAA-FM: Public file; LMS
- Webcast: Listen live
- Website: www.wbaa.org

WBAA (920 AM) and WBAA-FM (101.3 FM) are public radio stations licensed to West Lafayette, Indiana, United States, both serving the Lafayette metro area and the Indianapolis area with a news/talk format. The stations were founded by Purdue University, but in 2022, 100 years after WBAA's start, ownership was transferred to Metropolitan Indianapolis Public Media, Inc. (MIPM), which also owns WFYI radio and television in Indianapolis. Both stations originate from studios in the Edward C. Elliott Hall of Music on the Purdue campus and transmitter sites south of Lafayette, with the WBAA-FM transmitter site at the Throckmorton Purdue Agricultural Center.

WBAA, branded as "WBAA News", broadcasts a news-oriented format, with programming from National Public Radio (NPR). WBAA is the oldest operating radio station in Indiana, beginning in 1922 and with several antecedents on the Purdue campus. Originally a service noted for its limited agricultural extension and educational programming as well as Purdue sports broadcasts, it gradually improved its facilities and expanded its output over its first 20 years on air. The station was one of NPR's charter members in 1971. An FM adjunct, WBAA-FM, began broadcasting in 1993 and originally featured a mixture of NPR news and classical music; both stations combined formats in early November 2025. WBAA-FM also transmits two HD Radio digital subchannels featuring classical and jazz, respectively; the classical subchannel is additionally relayed over low-power translator W290CM (105.9 FM).

== History ==
=== Pre-broadcast radio at Purdue ===
Experimentation in radio—then commonly known as "wireless telegraphy"—at Purdue University dated back to at least 1910, but initial attempts to construct a transmitter capable of communicating with other stations had limited success. A more ambitious effort in 1916, based at the Electrical laboratory, had to be suspended in early 1917, when, with the entry of the United States into World War I, most civilian stations were ordered to shut down. During the war, Purdue conducted radio instruction for students and military personnel.

After the end of the war, civilian radio stations were again permitted. In 1919, the university was issued a temporary authorization, followed by a "Technical and Training School" license which was originally given the call sign of 9YA, which was changed the next year to 9YB. 9YB's primary transmitter was a 2-kilowatt spark set, which transmitted on wavelengths of 200 meters (1500 kHz) and 375 meters (800 kHz) and could only send the dots-and-dashes of Morse code. It was employed to send and receive messages between Purdue and other stations around the Midwest. The Purdue Exponent newspaper used 9YB as part of a news service among Western Conference schools. For audio broadcasts, the station added a small transmitter that had been constructed as a thesis assignment by R. H. Vehling, class of 1921.

=== Early years of WBAA ===
Effective December 1, 1921, the United States Department of Commerce, which regulated radio at this time, adopted regulations requiring that stations broadcasting to the general public had to have a Limited Commercial license. Two wavelengths were designated for use by broadcasting stations: 360 meters (833 kHz) for "entertainment" programs and 485 meters (619 kHz) for "market and weather" reports. In order to conform with the new regulations, the university applied for a broadcasting station license, which was issued on April 5, 1922, with the call letters WBAA, for operation on the 360-meter "entertainment" wavelength. (Note: One source gives 370 meters (810 kHz), but at this time 833 kHz was used for all entertainment programming.) 9YB continued in use for experimental and amateur transmissions. Although not the first Indiana station to receive a broadcasting license, WBAA is the oldest surviving one. (Another contender, WSBT in South Bend, was not licensed until late June 1922.)

The WBAA call sign was randomly assigned from a sequential list of available call letters and was one of the first four-letter call signs issued to a broadcasting station, as most earlier stations had received three-letter assignments. The earliest reported broadcast as WBAA was made on April 21, 1922, of an Arbor Day message prepared by Secretary of Agriculture Henry C. Wallace, that was read over numerous stations across the United States.

Much of the output from WBAA in its early years consisted of talks from Purdue's agricultural extension and engineering departments. These included such discussions as "The Hot School Dinner", "Home Canning of Meats", "Bread from Indiana Flour", and "Elimination of Smoke, Dust, and Fumes in Industrial Processes". Also broadcast by the station were livestock reports from Chicago's market and broadcasts of Purdue sports, such as the dedication ceremony of Ross–Ade Stadium in 1924 and Purdue–Indiana basketball games.

After more transmitting frequencies became available, WBAA was reassigned to 1060 kHz in 1924, which was changed the next year to 1100 kHz. By 1926, the station's broadcasting schedule was 7:15 to 8:15 p.m. on Mondays, Wednesdays, and Fridays, with test transmissions as experimental station 9XY after midnight on Saturdays. Power was raised to 500 watts, by which time the station was airing the full slate of Purdue home basketball games.

The Federal Radio Commission (FRC), formed in 1927, downgraded the nighttime power of a University of Illinois station, WRM, from 1,000 to 500 watts, and ordered it to share WBAA's frequency. On November 11, 1928, with the implementation of the FRC's General Order 40, WBAA was reassigned to 1400 kHz, sharing time with two other Indiana stations: Culver Military Academy's WCMA and WKBF, a commercial station in Indianapolis. WKBF got a power boost to 500 watts but now had to share air time with the other two stations, with WKBF allotted four-sevenths, two-sevenths assigned to WCMA, and the remaining seventh assigned to WBAA, primarily on Mondays and Fridays.

=== 1929 fire, rebuild, and full-time operation ===
On the afternoon of March 14, 1929, a fire erupted that destroyed the facilities of WBAA; it was reported to have started when a spark ignited hydrogen gas that was leaking from batteries. The blaze also caused smoke damage to the Electrical Engineering Building in which WBAA was located; some students had to be rescued from windowsills, where they had fled the advancing fire. Purdue immediately began planning to rebuild WBAA as a 1,000-watt station, but the FRC would only allow it to continue as a 500-watt outlet. Operations of WBAA resumed at the end of January 1930 after more than 10 months of silence; the facility was prepared to broadcast with 1,000 watts if the opportunity ever presented itself. Purdue also successfully applied to begin broadcasts with 1,000 watts during daylight hours. WCMA ceased broadcasts in 1932, with its time going to WKBF, which also purchased its assets. WKBF was allowed to use the frequency on a full-time basis from late May to October, when Purdue was on summer break. The station was rebuilt in 1933; all of the equipment was built on the Purdue campus. The large water-cooled transmitter, on the top floor of the Electrical Engineering Building, was in a space so inadequately ventilated that engineer Ralph Townsley wondered why it never burned up.

In 1934, the FRC granted full time to WKBF and moved WBAA to a new frequency, 890 kHz, which it would share with WILL, the former WRM in Illinois. Broadcasting on the new dial position began that August. That fall, it broadcast for four and a half hours a day, six days a week.

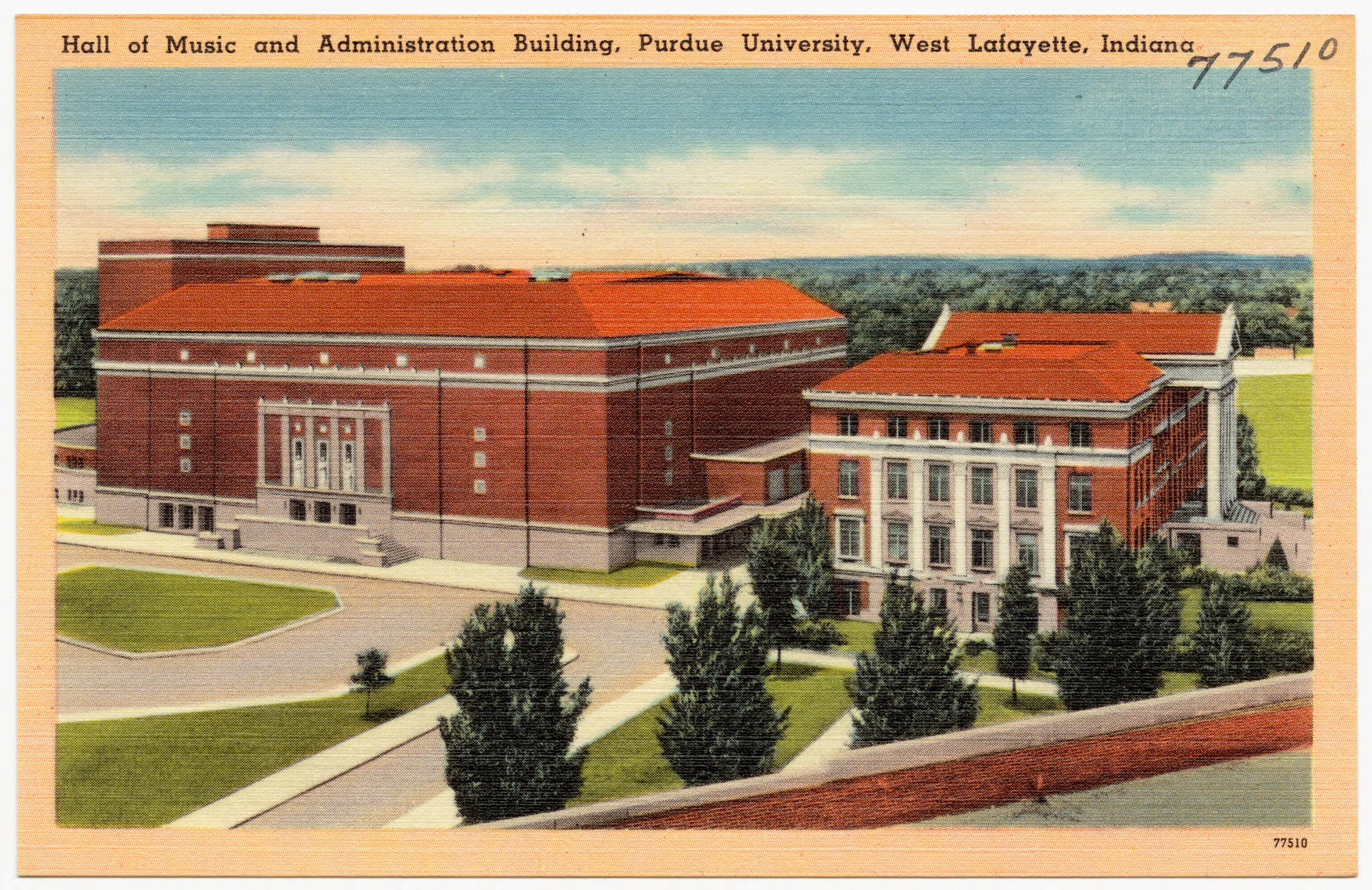
WBAA moved its studios into the Hall of Music in 1941

As early as 1937, Purdue filed to relocate the transmitter and increase daytime power to 5,000 watts. The first proposal involved relocating the transmitter to a more central location in the state and establishing a studio in Indianapolis, as well as converting WBAA into a partly commercial operation; this was vetoed by the Purdue board of trustees. The Federal Communications Commission (FCC) approved in November 1940, setting up an eventful 1941 for the Purdue station. In February, the studios moved out of three rooms in the Electrical Engineering Building to the Elliott Hall of Music. The new transmitter site was not ready for several more months, but one last change was in store for the old one; on March 29, WBAA moved from 890 to 920 kHz, along with all stations on that frequency, as part of the frequency reorganization of NARBA. Broadcasting began from the new 5,000-watt transmitter south of Lafayette on September 27; the site included three 265-foot (81 m) towers to support the directional antenna pattern used at night.

WBAA's educational service was also increasing. In 1944, the station began to broadcast the "Purdue University School of the Air", radio school programming that by 1952 was being listened to by 275,000 schoolchildren in Indiana and neighboring states; this continued until 1968. There were adult education courses, coverage of Purdue and West Lafayette High School sporting events, and market reports, broadcast from a station with 16 staff and 35 student staffers. WBAA began to distribute tapes of its programming to other commercial and noncommercial broadcasters in the mid-1950s.

In 1959, Purdue filed for and received a construction permit to expand its service to FM on 99.1 MHz. The university wanted to improve its nighttime service, which due to the nature of the AM operation was directional and had poor reception going any direction other than north from Lafayette. However, work was delayed on the project because Purdue engineering resources were diverted to the Stratovision program of the Midwest Program on Airborne Television Instruction, which used flying TV transmitters to broadcast educational TV content over a wide area. Purdue ultimately forfeited the construction permit in 1962. The late 1960s also saw the station begin to do some of its own news reporting of demonstrations that were taking place on the campus; the times also inspired a series of new programs on race relations and birth control. However, its programming continued to focus on education and shows for the "mature, enriched adult", including classical music selections.

Several early WBAA alumni went on to other broadcast roles, locally and nationally. Durwood Kirby's lengthy broadcasting and media career got its start at WBAA in the early 1930s. Dick Shively, who was a sportscaster in the late 1930s, owned television stations in several Midwestern states, including WLFI-TV in Lafayette. Chris Schenkel went on to a career as a radio and television sportscaster. Lew Wood later was the news anchor on Today in 1975 and 1976, and actors George Peppard and Karen Black also worked at WBAA while at Purdue.

=== Public radio ===
WBAA was one of the charter members of NPR and carried its inaugural broadcast, the first edition of All Things Considered, on May 1, 1971. The addition of NPR to WBAA helped increase interest in the radio station among the general audience. It also rounded out a station that was in its 50th year of providing a varied service: courses for Purdue University credit, a late evening rock show, educational programming syndicated to dozens of stations nationwide, and the origination of Purdue football broadcasts to 13 commercial stations across Indiana. The football games continued on the station through the 1989 season, making WBAA the last university radio station in the Big Ten to still carry its team's games; in 1990, syndicator Raycom Sports dropped WBAA from the network in order to give it increased flexibility with commercial inventory. However, WBAA continued to air smaller sports events, such as women's basketball.

A 1982 windstorm toppled one of the three towers used at night and twisted another requiring the station to temporarily broadcast with reduced power after sunset; all three masts were replaced.

Thirty years after its first attempt, Purdue filed again in 1989 to build a new radio station on the FM band in West Lafayette, with another channel allocated to the area at the university's request. The FCC approved the application for WBAA-FM in 1991, with the intention to create a musically oriented FM service and a news- and talk-focused AM station. A fundraising drive was led by Purdue's class of 1942 to finance construction. WBAA-FM went into operation on February 1, 1993, providing a mostly automated classical music service. The Hall of Music studios were also remodeled to support the second station.

=== Dropping NPR ===
In September 1992, WBAA announced it would cease to broadcast programs distributed by NPR because of a 20 percent increase in subscription fees to NPR for 1993. It replaced NPR fare with shows from other public radio distributors, such as American Public Radio and the BBC World Service. The decision generated significant pushback from listeners; WILL in Illinois began to woo disaffected WBAA listeners seeking their favorite NPR shows, going as far as to run newspaper ads in Lafayette. In 1995, local listeners began to receive some NPR programming again when WVXU in Cincinnati acquired WNDY, a silent commercial station licensed to Crawfordsville, and relaunched it as WVXI; however, WVXI only aired Morning Edition and not All Things Considered.

Purdue officials began approaching the local business community in 1996, seeking financial support to return NPR output to the WBAA stations. The simultaneous threat of federal cuts to public broadcasting led WBAA to start its first-ever pledge drive that fall. In June 1997, Purdue received enough financial support from listeners to return WBAA to NPR after nearly five years away.

=== WBAA in the 21st century ===
WBAA began 24-hour broadcasting on FM in 1994 and on AM in 1998. Internet streaming of the WBAA stations began in 2000. That year, a $1.5 million expansion of the Hall of Music studios was approved by Purdue's board of trustees in lieu of relocating them to the South Campus where a fine arts center was being built.

In 2008, the FM station was approved to increase power to the present 14,000 watts. The change came as an equipment renovation was already planned; the AM station began broadcasting in HD Radio that December, and after the FM upgrade in 2009, WBAA-FM also debuted HD Radio, initially using an HD2 subchannel to rebroadcast WXPN in Philadelphia. The most recent signal improvement came in 2016, when the AM station added an FM translator at 105.9 MHz, a 220-watt facility that enables FM reception of the AM service in the immediate Lafayette area and within campus buildings where AM signals had been poorly received.

In 2016, WBAA announced it planned to remove This American Life from its schedule after the show announced plans to add Pandora as a distributor, a decision general manager Mike Savage panned as unprincipled and troubling for public radio. The announcement met with poor reception from listeners, and WBAA dropped the plan within days.

=== Sale to Metropolitan Indianapolis Public Media ===
In July 2021, Purdue University announced plans to transfer WBAA management to Metropolitan Indianapolis Public Media (MIPM), the owner of WFYI radio and television in Indianapolis, pending approval by the Purdue board of trustees and subsequently by the FCC. In February 2022, the deal was filed with the FCC; the stations would be sold to MIPM along with a $500,000 commitment over two years for initial operating costs, while MIPM would give Purdue $700,000 in underwriting announcements over a 10-year period and $300,000 in paid student internships to Purdue students as well as nominal lease fees for WBAA's studios and transmission facilities. Integration with the WFYI stations would come in the form of some WBAA programs being broadcast to WFYI listeners as well as WBAA members gaining access to PBS Passport from WFYI TV. The sale was finalized on June 30, 2022.

On October 22, 2025, MIPM announced WBAA's NPR news and talk lineup would be simulcast full-time over WBAA-FM starting on November 3. In turn, WBAA-FM's classical programming will move to WBAA-HD2 and simulcast on low-power translator W290CM (which heretofore simulcast the AM) displacing the HD2's jazz format to WBAA-HD3.

== Programming ==
WBAA and WBAA-FM currently carries a service of news and talk programs, with such key shows as Morning Edition, All Things Considered, and Marketplace, as well as the BBC World Service in overnight hours.

WBAA-FM's HD2 subchannel offers a service of classical music primarily consisting of programming from Classical Music Indy, Performance Today, and other music shows.

WBAA-FM's HD3 subchannel airs jazz music from the PubJazz service as well as a Saturday night block of several specialty shows.

== See also ==
- List of initial AM-band station grants in the United States
