= Classical Music Indy =

Music organization in Indiana, United States

- Formation: 1968
- Type: 501(c)(3)
- Purpose: Broadcast of classical music and community programming
- Headquarters: Indianapolis, IN
- Board Chair: Eloise Paul
- Main organ: Board of Directors
- Budget: $450,000
- Staff: 5
- Website: www.classicalmusicindy.org
- Formerly called: Fine Arts Society of Indianapolis (1968–2014)

Classical Music Indy is an American nonprofit organization based in Indianapolis, Indiana, United States, that produces and syndicates classical music radio programming. Classical Music Indy provides the classical music programs heard on WICR (88.7 FM) in Indianapolis and part-time on three other stations in the state. It was established in 1968 to build support for classical music on the radio after a prior commercial station was sold and changed formats.

== History ==
Prior to 1961, there was little classical music on the radio in Central Indiana. In May of that year, a group of research chemists from Eli Lilly and Company pooled their resources, formed a corporation and on May 13 the "Lively Arts Station," WAIV (105.7 FM) went on the air. The station offered a variety of classical music, jazz, poetry, interviews, folk music, discussions of religion, and editorials. Its broadcasts emanated from a tower atop the Dearborn Hotel on East Michigan Street in Indianapolis.

The station only became profitable in 1967, when the program format became exclusively classical. Programs were chosen by station staff and were presented in their entirety without interruption. This was the first completely classical music format on the radio in Indianapolis. However, later in the year, the owners opted to sell WAIV to a group that sought to give the city its first Black radio station.

Norbert Neuss, who had been WAIV's program director, was determined to save classical music in the city. With the help of his friends, he purchased WAIV's 2,500 classical record library, packed them up, and stored them in the Lilly Pavilion of the Indianapolis Museum of Art. Neuss's friendship with Frank P. Thomas, founder and owner of the Burger Chef System of restaurants, turned out to be a decisive factor in fulfilling his dream of reviving classical music on the radio. In early 1968, Gerald "Jerry" Hinchman, Dr. Norbert Neuss, Dr. F. Bruce Peck, Frank P. Thomas, P.E. McCallister, and Willis K. Kunz collaborated to form the Fine Arts Society of Indianapolis, Inc., as a public charitable trust.

Upon hearing that the Indianapolis Public Schools were constructing a new radio/television center, the Society approached school officials. After informal discussions between Neuss and the staff of the school's broadcast center, IPS's Board of School Commissioners and the Society arrived at an agreement whereby the Fine Arts Society would augment the instructional programs of the IPS's radio station, WIAN-FM, with a "Second Programme" of classical music during prime evening hours. At the time, WIAN-FM only broadcast during school hours. that went on the air in December 1969. Seven months later, the group had 700 supporting members. By 1971, the Second Programme was airing for 36 hours a week, but it also was facing a fundraising shortfall. Another setback came in 1973, when the Thomas Building was destroyed in the W. T. Grant fire; while the society's mailing list and most of its record collection were stored elsewhere, the Fine Arts Society lost its offices, 1,500 records, and 60 operas in the blaze.

The partnership between the Fine Arts Society and the Indianapolis Public Schools station also turned out to be beneficial for WIAN. An expansion of broadcast hours fueled by the Second Programme turned the FM into a first-class station with NPR and qualified it for Corporation for Public Broadcasting funding. The idea was that an increase in donations from a major facility improvement for the radio station would pay for the expansion into morning hours, but the new broadcast tower was seriously delayed, and the society was overextended, cutting back on hours and making a loss for the first time in its history. In 1979, the Fine Arts Society proposed to the school board that it take over operations after talk of transferring the station to the Indianapolis–Marion County Public Library surfaced; at the time, the Indianapolis Star noted that the Second Programme was one of the few highly regarded offerings of the radio station.

The deteriorating relationship led to a new one. In 1979, Indiana Central University (now the University of Indianapolis) and the Fine Arts Society reached a deal by which the university would make major technical improvements to WICR (88.7 FM), with the Second Programme moving to WICR once the upgrades were complete. Neuss noted of the switch, "We feel WIAN doesn't need us anymore. We helped them become a public radio station." It was not until January 26, 1983, when Fine Arts Society output moved to WICR, with the Second Programme being joined by a new "First Programme" of classical music.

In 1986, the Fine Arts Society won a George Foster Peabody Award for excellence in overall programming, the first Peabody awarded to a radio station in Indianapolis and the first for overall programming in the state of Indiana. The Metropolitan Opera moved to WICR from WAJC, the former station of Butler University, when that outlet was sold in 1993 and became a commercial station.

Neuss retired in 2001 and died in 2006.

In 2014, the Fine Arts Society announced a name change to Classical Music Indy to more clearly communicate the organization's purpose. That same year, WBAA-FM in West Lafayette, WBOI-HD2 in Fort Wayne, and WNIN-FM in Evansville began to air CMI programming for the first time.
