= WFYI =

WFYI may refer to:

- WFYI (TV), a television station (channel 21, virtual 20) licensed to serve Indianapolis, Indiana, United States
- WFYI-FM, a radio station (90.1 FM) licensed to serve Indianapolis, Indiana
- WFYI-LD, a low-power ATSC 3.0 television station (channel 29, virtual 20) licensed to serve Indianapolis, Indiana, United States
