= Across Indiana =

Across Indiana is a weekly 30-minute-long television program which covers places, people, history and culture across Indiana.

Hosted by Michael Atwood, Across Indiana is a regional Emmy winning program originating on WFYI TV 20 in Indianapolis. The producer is Jim Simmons. The executive producer is Clayton Taylor. It was originally produced and directed by Dave Stoelk, who is no longer with the program. Many of the most popular Across Indiana stories were shot by Chief Videographer Tim R. Swartz. It premiered in 1989. According to the website wfyi.org, new episodes have been broadcast since January 2023, with new host Aric Hartvig. Michael Atwood has since retired.

The theme music was written and recorded by Emmy-winning artist Tim Brickley.

In 1998 a book of recipes from the Hoosier state was released called Recipes From Across Indiana: The Best of Heartland Cooking edited by Sheila Sampson.

== Broadcasting stations ==
- WFYI 20, Indianapolis, Indiana
- HCTV 22, Hanover, Indiana
- WNIN 9, Evansville, Indiana
- WTIU 30, Indiana University, Bloomington, Indiana
- WIPB 49, Ball State University, Muncie, Indiana
- WNIT 34, South Bend, Indiana
- WVUT 22, Vincennes University, Vincennes, Indiana
