= Leon Falk Jr. =

American businessman

- Born: September 23, 1901; Pittsburgh, Pennsylvania
- Died: June 9, 1988 (aged 86); Pittsburgh, Pennsylvania
- Education: Yale
- Occupation: Executive
- Known for: Philanthropy
- Spouse(s): Katherine S. Falk (m. 1926–1947), Josephine S. Falk (m. 1948–1962), Loti Grunberg Falk (m. 1963–1988)

Leon Falk Jr. (September 23, 1901 – June 9, 1988) was a steel company executive and philanthropist in Pittsburgh, Pennsylvania. Falk was involved in the founding of several arts and cultural institutions in the Pittsburgh area, notably the University of Pittsburgh's Falk Clinic, Falk Laboratory School, the Pittsburgh Playhouse, the Pittsburgh Ballet Theater and the Chancellor's Residence for the University of Pittsburgh.

== Early life ==
Falk was born September 23, 1901, in Pittsburgh, Pennsylvania, to Leon Falk (1869–1928) and Fanny Edel Falk (1879–1910). He attended Philips Exeter Academy from 1918 to 1920. He graduated from Yale University, the Sheffield Scientific School in 1924. He was a member of the Pi Lambda Phi fraternity.

== Career ==
=== Business life ===
Falk went to work for Weirton Steel in 1926 and soon was named treasurer. He was chairman of the board from 1948 to 1952 and later became executive director of National Steel's executive committee.

Invested with Richard King Mellon in one of the key projects in Pittsburgh's first Renaissance, Chatham Center, the "City Within a City". When it opened, the 5.5-acre, $26 million Chatham Center included an eight-story office building, a Howard Johnson motor lodge, a residential building, a six-level parking structure and a 660-seat movie theater. It was part of the Lower Hill redevelopment area where 1,300 buildings were demolished in the late 1950s and early 1960s to make way for the Civic Arena.

=== Philanthropy and Culture ===
In 1926 Falk bought what would become the family farm, Falkland Farms, at Schellsburg, Pennsylvania. He won national honors breeding jersey cows and purebred Polled Hereford cattle. He was a director of the Polled Hereford Association from 1967 to 1971 and was inducted into the association's Hall of Fame in 1975.

In December 1929, he and his uncle, Maurice Falk established the Maurice and Laura Falk Foundation, commonly known as the Falk Foundation, a $10 million trust fund established “for human welfare.” The foundation focused on contributing to economic research, and philanthropic work in the Pittsburgh community, particularly through the creation and early support of the Brookings Institution in Washington, D.C. Although planned to exist until 1967, the Falk Foundation continued until 2013, when its largest and final grant went to Chatham University's School of Sustainability & the Environment for the completion of the Eden Hall Campus. The grant was also the largest grant in the history of Chatham University. Chatham's School of Sustainability & the Environment was renamed, the Falk School of Sustainability. The Falk Foundation made its first grant to Chatham in 1952 with the funding of Chatham's Falk Hall, named in honor of Laura Falk.

Falk held the record for largest Atlantic blue marlin caught on 50 pound line when he landed a 551-pounder of Andros Island in the Bahamas in 1960. He caught the marlin from his yacht, Saba.

==== University of Pittsburgh ====
Falk, while serving as the vice-chairman of the University of Pittsburgh's Board of Trustees in 1966, gave the university his house on Devonshire Street in the Shadyside neighborhood to serve as the Chancellor's Residence, a function in which the house still serves.

==== Fanny Edel Falk Elementary School ====
Falk and his sister Marjorie Falk Levy began planning a memorial to their parents in 1929. Having ruled out an addition to the Falk Memorial at Rodef Shalom, they founded an elementary school in honor of their mother, Fanny Edel Falk Elementary School (now Falk Laboratory School). The school was intended to promote progressive and experimental methods of teaching that could be observed and studied by those pursuing a teaching degree. The school was created as a laboratory for teaching, directly connected to the School of Education at the University of Pittsburgh. Established under a charter agreement between the University and Leon Falk Jr. and Marjorie Falk Levy in 1930, the school has a unique status among American laboratory schools in that it is the only one that is known to have a legal charter that stipulates its purpose and functions. Construction was completed on January 13, 1932, and the school opened in the fall of 1932.

==== Dominican Republic Settlement Association ====
The Evian Conference in 1938 was organized to find solutions to the growing Jewish refugee crisis in Nazi Germany. The Dominican Republic and its dictatorial leader Rafael Trujillo agreed to accept 100,000 refugees, the only of 32 countries at the conference willing to increase their limits. Falk Jr. became a leader in the Dominican Republic Settlement Association, or DORSA, an American Jewish Joint Distribution Committee project to resettle Jewish refugees from Europe to a colony in Sosúa, Dominican Republic. Falk Jr. eventually served as president of the association from 1941 to 1942. Falk Jr. and his wife Katherine were very active in the association, including sponsoring some of the trips, arranging grants from the Falk Foundation and visiting the colony several times. After various challenges including difficulty in arranging ocean transportation, the goal of 1500 refugees was set.

==== Pittsburgh Playhouse ====
The Pittsburgh Civic Playhouse was founded in 1933. A committee of Richard S. Rauh, Helen Wayne, Leon Falk Jr. and Charles Rosenbloom re-organized the group into the non-profit Pittsburgh Playhouse in late 1934. The Pittsburgh Playhouse became a successful community theater for many years.

By the mid 1960s the Pittsburgh Playhouse was in crisis. After a failed move to a professional theater company with the American Conservatory Theater, attendance and subscriptions had dropped off significantly and the ambitious seasons had increased expenses and driven away corporate support, leaving the Playhouse in a tenuous financial position by December 1966. Loti Falk and Theodore Hazlett Jr. led a successful emergency effort to raise $300,000 in order for the 1966–1967 Playhouse season to continue.

== Personal life ==
Leon Falk Jr. was married 3 times.

Falk married Katherine Sonneborn on June 24, 1926. The marriage ended in divorce in August 1947.

In December 1948, Falk married his ex-wife's sister, Josephine Sonneborn Ross. Josephine died in her sleep on board their yacht, Saba, in Stuart, Florida on February 11, 1962.

Falk later met Loti Grunberg while living in New York City and were married in 1963. The couple moved back to Pittsburgh from New York City in 1963 and became increasingly active in the arts and cultural community of Pittsburgh. Loti joined the board of the Pittsburgh Symphony in 1963 and helped the Pittsburgh Playhouse avoid financial collapse in 1966. Loti Falk helped found the Pittsburgh Ballet Theater in 1969.

Falk died on June 9, 1988, after a series of strokes at Shadyside Hospital in Pittsburgh and was survived by his wife Loti, three daughters, two sons, a stepdaughter and four stepsons.
