= Steven Libman =

American performing-arts executive (born 1959)

- Born: October 5, 1959; Providence, Rhode Island, U.S.
- Education: Rhode Island College
- Occupations: Arts executive public speaker
- Spouses: Keitha Libman (m. 1980; div. 2013) Carol Killworth (m. 2015)
- Children: Tracy
- Website: stevenlibman.com

Steven Libman (born October 5, 1959) is an American performing-arts executive, known for leading major orchestra, dance and theatre companies and performing-arts centers with an emphasis on classical music and jazz.

Since 2020, Libman has been the president and chief executive officer for the Jacksonville Symphony, located in Jacksonville, Florida.

His career spans more than three decades and he has previously served as the managing director or chief executive officer for the Pittsburgh Ballet Theatre (Pittsburgh, Pennsylvania), the La Jolla Playhouse (La Jolla, California), and The Palladium at the Center for the Performing Arts (Carmel, Indiana). He has also served as the chief advancement officer for the Atlanta Ballet (Atlanta, Georgia).

Libman is also a public speaker and was the co-host and co-founder of The Voice of the Performing Arts, a weekly public-radio show devoted to the importance of arts education.

== Early life and education ==
Libman was born on October 5, 1959, in Providence, Rhode Island. He is the son of Marilyn (deceased) and Herman Libman (deceased). He has a brother, Scott.

Libman grew up in Rhode Island and the family moved to Harrisburg, Pennsylvania, when he was in the sixth grade, where they stayed for three years. Libman then moved back to Rhode Island, went to high school at Cranston High School East, located in Cranston, Rhode Island. He then went to Rhode Island College, located in Providence, where he received a Bachelor of Arts degree in performing arts management in 1981.

== Career ==
Early in Libman's career, he served as managing director of the Rev Theatre Company (formerly the Finger Lakes Musical Theatre Festival) and the Fulton Opera House, located Lancaster, Pennsylvania, before being named managing director of the Pittsburgh Ballet, where he spent seventeen years.

While with the ballet, Libman broke new ground in funder relations, raising more than $50 million. He developed ground-breaking ballets set to jazz and the music of Paul Simon, Pete Seeger, Sting and Bruce Springsteen. Libman also established tours to Taiwan, Wolf Trap (Washington, D.C.), the Hollywood Bowl and the Joyce Theatre in New York City. When he left the ballet, he was the longest-serving arts executive in the city and one of the two longest-serving managing directors of major ballet companies in North America.

From 2005 to 2008, Libman served as managing director and the chief administrative officer at the Tony Award–winning La Jolla Playhouse. He ran a four-venue complex that produced over 300 performances per season, and produced 28 plays, including ten world premieres.

Libman was the founding president and chief executive officer of The Palladium at the Center for the Performing Arts in Carmel, Indiana, from 2009 to 2012. While there, he planned and launched the first few seasons and produced two major opening-night festival galas with Michael Feinstein, Chris Botti, Neil Sedaka, Dionne Warwick, David Hyde Pierce and dancers from American Ballet Theatre. He also produced a PBS television special with Michael Feinstein seen by eleven million viewers. The special, titled Michael Feinstein: The Sinatra Project, was nominated for Outstanding Music Direction at the 64th Primetime Creative Arts Emmy Awards.

From 2014 to 2020, Libman was the chief advancement officer for the Atlanta Ballet, raising over $35 million, including $5.5 million for a new production of The Nutcracker. He re-designed the entire development program and also managed the development and governance committees.

In 2020, Libman was appointed the president and chief executive officer for the Jacksonville Symphony. The symphony, with an annual budget of $12.5 million, has sixty full-time musicians and performs eighty concerts each year in Jacoby Symphony Hall.

Libman has taught graduate courses in fundraising, leadership, human resources and arts administration at the University of Pittsburgh, Carnegie Mellon University, University of California, San Diego and Syracuse University. Libman is the president of The Libman Group, a consulting practice specializing in the performing arts.

He is also the former co-host of The Voice of the Performing Arts radio show. The show ran from 2013 to 2016, interviewed over 500 guests through 166 shows for a weekly audience of up to 10,000. The show aired weekly on public-radio station WICR 88.7 at the University of Indianapolis and was podcast in iTunes.

== Awards ==
In 2000, Libman was awarded as an Outstanding Alumnus in the Arts by Rhode Island College. He also has certificates in Non-profit Management and Strategic Planning from the Harvard Business School and the Stanford University Graduate School of Business.

In 2008, Libman was awarded a Leadership Advancement Award by the Irvine Foundation. He has served on the boards of the following organizations: Dance/USA, the La Jolla Country Day School, City National Bank Advisory Board, and the American Guild of Musical Artists (AGMA) Retirement and Health Funds.

== Personal life ==
Libman is married to Carol Killworth and was married to Keitha Libman from 1980 to 2013.

He has a daughter, Tracy, and two grandchildren.
