= WNDY =

WNDY may refer to:

- WNDY-TV, a television station (channel 23 analog/32 digital) licensed to Marion, Indiana, United States
- WNDY (FM), a radio station (91.3 FM) licensed to Crawfordsville, Indiana, United States
- WNDY as the fictional television station around which the short-lived WIOU was based
- WNDY as the fictional radio station in the Dolly Parton film Straight Talk
