= Pittsburgh Playhouse =

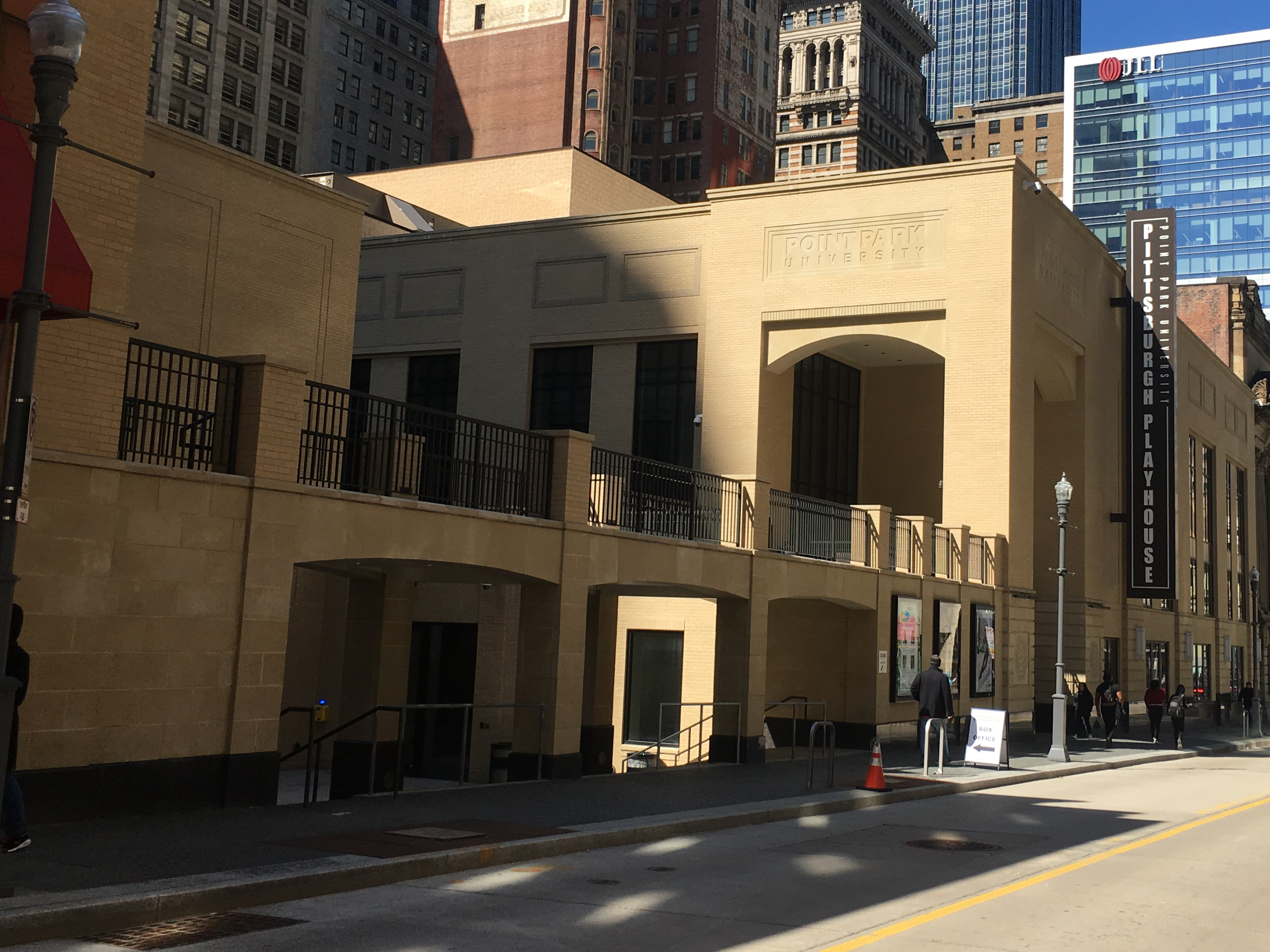
- Pittsburgh Playhouse theater on Forbes Avenue
- Interactive map of Pittsburgh Playhouse
- Address: 350 Forbes Avenue; Pittsburgh, Pennsylvania; United States
- Coordinates: 40.43959°N 79.99989°W
- Owner: Point Park University
- Capacity: 550
- Type: Theater
- Current use: Performing arts center

Construction
- Opened: October 13, 2018
- Architect: DLR Group

Website
- Pittsburghplayhouse.com

Pittsburgh Playhouse is Point Park University's performing arts center located in Pittsburgh, Pennsylvania. It houses three performance spaces and is home to The Rep, Point Park's resident professional theatre company, as well as three student companies—Conservatory Theatre Company, Conservatory Dance Company, and Playhouse Jr. The Conservatory Theatre Company offers five productions each year that are performed by undergraduate students at Point Park; each season consists of a mixture of established plays and musicals, as well as occasional new works.

The Conservatory Dance Company offers ballet, modern, and jazz dance productions featuring Point Park undergraduates; these consist of works by established choreographers as well as new pieces choreographed by both students and professionals. The Playhouse Jr. offers children's theatre performed by Point Park undergraduates; it is the second oldest continually running children's theatre in the United States. Playhouse Jr. has also participated in the Pittsburgh New Works Festival. The Rep offers four productions performed by professional actors; the season usually consists of a mixture of established and new plays.

The Rep has hosted regional premieres by such playwrights as Amy Hartman, Tammy Ryan, and Edward J. Delaney.

The Playhouse moved from its longtime location on Craft Avenue in Oakland into a new complex on Forbes Avenue in Downtown Pittsburgh, adjoining Point Park University's campus in 2018. The complex features three public performance spaces; the 560 seat PNC Theatre, the 200 seat Highmark Studio Theatre, and the 99 seat Rauh Theatre.

== History ==
The Pittsburgh Civic Playhouse was founded in 1933 as a non-profit community theater. The company organized a complete season for 1934 including The Silver Wedding, Mourning Becomes Electra, and The Female of the Species. Although successful, the Playhouse had a deficit and recruited Richard S Rauh to provide guidance. Rauh was respected as a board member of the Pittsburgh Symphony and Mendelssohn Choir of Pittsburgh. Richard S Rauh and Helen Wayne lead the formation of a seven-person executive board including Leon Falk Jr. and Charles Rosenbloom, creating the non-profit Pittsburgh Playhouse in December 1934. The executive board would oversee the financial and administrative affairs, both hired directors and stage managers, and a cast that would embody the community. Pittsburgh Playhouse was a civic theater company that was open to the community to perform alongside professional and semiprofessional actors.

In December 1934, the first production of the Pittsburgh Playhouse, Art and Mrs. Bottle, was held in the Frick School. In December 1935, the group hosted its first theatrical production, The Wind and the Rain in a newly rented vacant building on Craft Avenue which would become their long term home.

The first years of the Playhouse were led by director Herbert Gellendre. Although the Playhouse was having success, Gallendre had added an increasing number of professional actors to the company. His staging more challenging works such as From Morning to Midnight lead to an "art versus box office" argument with the executive board and led to Gallende's firing in 1937. Fred Burleigh was recruited from the Indianapolis Playhouse, the new director would remain with the company for the next thirty years not only bringing in a “golden age” filled with prosperity and professional actors but also expanded into a school and added two new theaters, Craft Avenue and Upstairs Theater. In the 1950s the Craft Avenue location housed the 250 seat Playhouse Restaurant in the buildings basement. It had its own water features, meat locker, onion-and-potato cellar and ice-cream parlor.

=== Rauh Family ===
The Rauh family were significant benefactors of the arts in Pittsburgh. Supporting the establishment of the Pittsburgh Symphony and a dozen other social/cultural organizations by his parents, Enoch and Bertha, Richard Solomon Rauh (1893-1954) was heir to a substantial fortune from his family's men's clothing business. During his time in New York, he met and fell in love with an actress, Helen Wayne. Shortly after graduating in 1933 from Carnegie Mellon with a degree in performance, Helen Wayne became a founding member of the Pittsburgh Civic Playhouse, where Richard S Rauh (1893-1954) first saw her. By 1934, Helen Wayne had become the “sweetheart” of the radio as an actress on the weekly show, The Charm Lady. Smitten by her, Rauh had promised to find her a stage to act on if she would not leave for Pittsburgh. The couple were married in 1935, Helen becoming Helen Wayne Rauh. Over the following four decades, Helen Wayne Rauh performed in 38 productions at the Pittsburgh Playhouse. Helen and Richard were married until his death in 1954.

Helen and Richard S. Rauh's son, Richard E. Rauh has been involved with the theater for many years, leading the film series in the 1990s. The families continued support resulted in the black box theater in the new playhouse being named the Rauh Theatre.

=== Pittsburgh Playhouse Jr. ===
The success from the late 1930s to the mid-1940s brought an opportunity to William Leech an instructor for adult amateur actors to instruct children. The additional program to the Pittsburgh Playhouse was Playhouse Jr. Since its creation in 1949, the Playhouse Jr. has remained an educational opportunity for children to receive professional instruction on acting as well as perform on an actual stage.

=== American Conservatory Theater and Financial Crisis ===
By the 1960s economic pressures began to threaten the continuation of the Playhouse as an independent organization. In 1965 William Ball joined with the Pittsburgh Playhouse and founded the American Conservatory Theater with support from Carnegie Mellon University, and the Rockefeller Foundation. ACT was a fully professional theater, replacing the community theater model in use for 28 years at the playhouse.

The ambitious 1965-1966 first season of ACT consisted of 12 productions in 4 months, all staged at the Playhouse. Some plays were Tartuffe, Six Characters in Search of an Author, Under Milk Wood and Tiny Alice. The change was dramatic, the plays were considered controversial, and Ball lost support of his Pittsburgh backers regarding the direction of the theater company. Long time supporters of the playhouse preferred the community, regional theater model of light comedies such as those featuring amateur actress and co-founder Helen Wayne Rauh in contrast to outside, professional actors.

Ball and the ACT departed Pittsburgh, touring their productions after the 1965–1966 season, eventually finding a permanent home for the company in San Francisco in 1967. With the departure of ACT, John Hancock, an ambitious 27-year old from New York, was brought in as director for the 1966–1967 season.

Attendance and subscriptions had dropped off significantly and the ambitious seasons had increased expenses and driven away corporate support, leaving the Playhouse in a tenuous financial position. Loti Falk (wife of Leon Falk Jr.) and Theodore Hazlett Jr. led a successful emergency effort to raise $300,000 in order for the 1966-1967 Playhouse season to continue.

Hancock organized another ambitious season, staging Bertolt Brecht's A Man's a Man, Tennessee Williams A Streetcar Named Desire Shakespeare's A Midsummer Night's Dream and six other plays, each of which were deemed challenging and controversial, in particular by some directors of the Playhouse board. The financial crisis and the perceived reduction in community support for the theater lead the Playhouse's executive committee to not extend Hancock's contract for the 1967–1968 season. As part of the decision to not extend Hancock's contract, 8 of the 40 directors on the Playhouse board resigned. After two seasons of conflict and financial emergencies, the Playhouse was in dire straits and looking for a change in direction and strategy.

=== Point Park University ===
After years of struggling for proper funding and the crisis of the two previous seasons, the Playhouse was acquired by Point Park University (then Point Park College) in 1968. As part of the purchase, Point Park also acquired the Playhouse School, which grew into the University's musical theater program, now ranked among the Top 10 colleges represented on Broadway.

The support of Point Park has enabled the Pittsburgh Playhouse to remain a cultural entity even with the financial setbacks, including the downsizing of much of the tradition of Pittsburgh Playhouse. The company was able to include a ballet company in addition to director's hour.

== Locations ==
=== Craft Avenue ===
Pittsburgh Playhouse
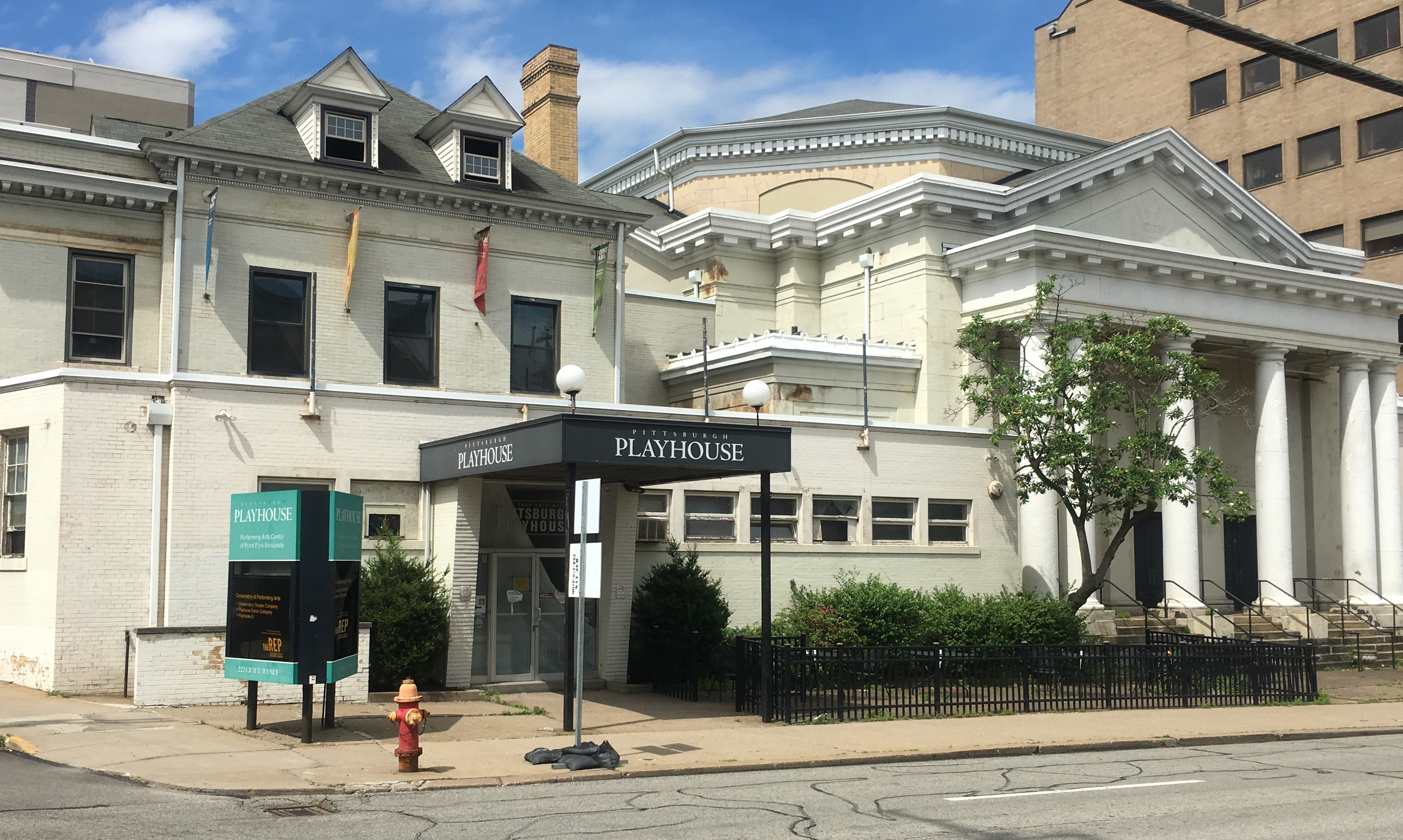
- Pittsburgh Playhouse on Craft Avenue in 2019
- Interactive map of Pittsburgh Playhouse
- Address: 222 Craft Avenue; Pittsburgh, Pennsylvania; United States
- Owner: Point Park University
- Type: Theater
- Current use: Closed

Construction
- Opened: 1934
- Closed: June 18, 2018
- Years active: 1934 - 2018

The first production of the Pittsburgh Playhouse, Art and Mrs. Bottle, was held at the Frick School. Shortly after, the Playhouse rented a 19th-century German social club building at the corner of Hamlet Street and Craft Avenue in the Oakland neighborhood. The first production was held here in 1934 with additional productions continuing at this location for the next seventy years. The Playhouse eventually expanded to three buildings around the corner onto Craft Avenue. The original building became the Rauh Theater. An adjacent house, purchase in 1951, became the lobby and theater offices. When the Tree of Life synagogue moved to Squirrel Hill in 1952 the synagogue building was added, becoming the Rockwell Theatre. The third theater was the black box Studio Theatre, entered via an alleyway on Craft Avenue.

=== New Pittsburgh Playhouse ===
Construction on a new theater complex on Forbes Avenue to replace the Craft Avenue location was announced in 2014. The design for the facility was led by architectural firm DLR Group. The original Pittsburgh Playhouse complex had many limitations, including being a converted set of buildings located far from the Point Park University campus. A new building would provide convenience to students, staff and audience as well as being purpose built as a theater.

The new playhouse includes 3 stages:

- PNC Theatre: the main stage, seating 550
- Highmark Theatre: a 200-seat space which can open to an outdoor courtyard on Forbes Avenue.
- Rauh Theatre: a 99-seat black box theater name for long time benefactor Richard E. Rauh

==== Preservation Concerns ====
The project was criticized by some preservationists for removing terra cotta facades from three turn-of-the-century buildings at 320, 322 and 330 Forbes Avenue to clear space for the playhouse. One building, the Royal at 320 Forbes Ave., was the home of Honus Wagner Sporting Goods for over 60 years. About 95 percent of the façade pieces were salvaged. Point Park agreed to deconstruct the Forbes Avenue facades and feature them in a two-story outdoor plaza after determining that integrating the facades into the new building would be impractical and add $2 million to the project. One facade serves as the entrance to the Stock Exchange Building and cafe from the plaza's second level.

The new playhouse integrated the former Pittsburgh Stock Exchange Building at 333 Fourth Ave. Built in 1903, the buildings covered and deteriorating three-story hall was renovated to reveal a series of stained glass skylights. The project renovated the hall to connect on three floors to the new playhouse along with the University Center and Library, a former bank complex.

== See also ==
- Theatre in Pittsburgh
