= Loti Falk Gaffney =

American philanthropist

- Born: December 21, 1920; Istanbul
- Died: October 13, 2015 (aged 94); New York City
- Known for: Philanthropy
- Spouse(s): Michael A. Gerard (m. 1944–1954) Leon Falk Jr. (m. 1963–1988) Frank J. Gaffney (m. 1993–2001)

Loti Falk Gaffney (December 21, 1920 - October 13, 2015) was an art philanthropist in Pittsburgh, Pennsylvania.

Falk Gaffney was involved in the founding of several arts and cultural institutions in the Pittsburgh area, most notably the Pittsburgh Ballet Theater and the Pittsburgh Playhouse.

== Early life ==
Loti Grunberg was born in Istanbul, Turkey lived in Milan and St. Moritz while a teenager, and briefly studied philosophy at the Sorbonne in Paris. Her family moved to New York City in 1939 and she studied at Columbia University. During World War II, she married U.S. Army Lt. Michael A. Gerard, and had two sons, Robert and Peter.

After her marriage ended in divorce in the 1950s, she took two jobs: an instructor in Italian and French at Berlitz School of Languages and provided scripts for dubbed, lip-synched Italian films. Among her many credits were Fellini's 8½, Divorce Italian Style, The Seven Capital Sins, L'Aventura and Rocco and his Brothers.

== Philanthropy ==
Loti Grunberg married Leon Falk Jr. in 1963 and moved from New York City to Pittsburgh, Leon's hometown, quickly becoming active in the arts and cultural community of the city.

Loti joined the board of the Pittsburgh Symphony in 1963 shortly after moving to Pittsburgh, and helped the Pittsburgh Playhouse avoid financial collapse in 1966.

=== Pittsburgh Playhouse ===
The Pittsburgh Civic Playhouse was founded in 1933. A committee of Richard S. Rauh, Helen Wayne, Leon Falk Jr. and Charles Rosenbloom re-organized the group into the non-profit Pittsburgh Playhouse in late 1934. The Pittsburgh Playhouse became a successful community theater for many years.

By the mid-1960s the Pittsburgh Playhouse was in crisis. After a failed move to a professional theater company with the American Conservatory Theater, attendance and subscriptions had dropped off significantly and the ambitious seasons had increased expenses and driven away corporate support, leaving the Playhouse in a tenuous financial position by December 1966. Loti Falk and Theodore Hazlett Jr. led a successful emergency effort to raise $300,000 in order for the 1966-1967 Playhouse season to continue.

=== Pittsburgh Ballet Theatre ===
Mrs. Falk Gaffney is best known for elevating Pittsburgh Ballet Theatre from its beginnings in 1969 as an affiliate of Point Park College, where Nicolas Petrov had started the dance department the previous year.

As a part of the Playhouse fundraising efforts, Falk Gaffney lead a group of community leaders in planning a week of events to call attention to the crisis. She asked Nicholas Petrov, who taught ballet at the Playhouse, to assemble a performing group to take part in the events. Petrov founded the dance department at Point Park College in 1968 and launched the Pittsburgh Ballet Theatre. Petrov recruited Falk Gaffney to be president of the Board.

Several times in the early 1970s, the Falk Family Trust and other connections of her husband Leon Falk Jr. made contributions to eliminate deficits and debts of the Ballet Theatre. By 1979 the company had over 5,000 subscribers and had significant corporate and foundation support. Falk Gaffney resigned from the ballet company in 1987 after being a board member, chairwoman, president of the board and eventually executive director.

== Personal life ==
Loti Falk Gaffney was married 3 times.

During World War II, Loti married U.S. Army Lt. Michael A. Gerard. They divorced in the mid-1950s.

Loti Grunberg married steel executive and philanthropist Leon Falk Jr. in 1963. Falk Jr. died in 1988.

In 1993, she married longtime friend and Pittsburgh lawyer Frank J. Gaffney. The couple acquired a home in Grassina, Italy, where they cultivated an olive grove. When Mr. Gaffney died in November 2001, Falk Gaffney returned to New York.

Falk Gaffney died on October 13, 2015, in her New York City apartment of natural causes.
