= The Voice of the Performing Arts =

The Voice of the Performing Arts

The Voice of the Performing Arts was a weekly radio show that explored the importance of arts education. It was a one-hour program hosted by Steven Libman, a longtime performing arts executive and former CEO of the Center for the Performing Arts in Carmel, Indiana and Jeff Swensson, an arts education advocate and former superintendent of Carmel Clay Schools.

The Voice of the Performing Arts ran from 2013 - 2016, interviewed over 500 guests through 166 shows for a weekly audience of up to 10,000. The show aired weekly on public radio station WICR 88.7 at the University of Indianapolis and was podcast in iTunes.

== Background ==
During each episode of The Voice of the Performing Arts, guests from the arts community including arts professionals, educators and community leaders discussed the importance of introducing young people to the arts. Discussions included how they personally were drawn to the arts as a child and what could be done today to get young people excited about the arts. The hosts often asked guests to explain the “transformative moment” when he or she fell in love with the performing arts.

The Voice of the Performing Arts debuted on March 30, 2013. The show originally aired at 1:00 p.m. Eastern Time before moving to the 10:00 a.m. time slot in February, 2014. The guests on the premiere episode included David Hochoy, artistic director of Dance Kaleidoscope; Kathleen Hacker, chair of UIndy’s Department of Music; Alan Davis, president and CEO of the Carmel Symphony Orchestra; and Soo Han, director of the Carmel High School Orchestra. The Voice of the Performing Arts hosted guests from a variety of nationally recognized arts organizations as well as organizations and schools across Indiana.
