= Metropolitan Indianapolis Public Media =

Public broadcaster in Indianapolis

Metropolitan Indianapolis Public Media, Inc. (MIPM) is a non-profit organization in Indianapolis, Indiana, United States, that operates television station WFYI and radio station WFYI-FM, which are member stations of the Public Broadcasting Service (PBS) and National Public Radio (NPR), respectively. Digital TV channel 20.1 (WFYI 1) primarily broadcasts mainline PBS Kids programming during the day and both locally produced and nationally produced and distributed PBS productions in the evenings and overnight. Digital TV channel 20.2 (WFYI 2) operates as "PBS Kids," airing children's programming. Digital TV channel 20.3 (WFYI 3) airs some re-runs of nationally developed programming as well as elements of the national "Create" network, which focuses programming on "how-to" types of educational TV. The beginnings of the "Indiana Channel" are also aired weekly on WFYI 3.

On July 1, 2022, MIPM took over operation of two former Purdue University radio stations, WBAA (AM) and WBAA-FM.

The corporation is headquartered at 1630 N. Meridian Street in Indianapolis.
