= WFIU =

Radio station at Indiana University Bloomington

Coordinates: 39.142°N 86.495°W

- Bloomington, Indiana; United States
- Broadcast area: South Central Indiana
- Frequency: 103.7 MHz (HD Radio)
- Branding: WFIU

Programming
- Format: Classical music, jazz, and NPR news
- Subchannels: HD2: Classical music, jazz, NPR news, talk
- Affiliations: NPR; Public Radio Exchange; American Public Media

Ownership
- Owner: Indiana University

History
- First air date: September 30, 1950 (at 91.9)
- Former frequencies: 91.9 MHz (1950–1951)
- Call sign meaning: "FM Indiana University"

Technical information
- Licensing authority: FCC
- Facility ID: 68269
- Class: B
- ERP: 29,000 watts
- HAAT: 197 meters (646 ft)
- Translator: see below

Links
- Public license information: Public file; LMS
- Webcast: Listen live; HD2: Listen live
- Website: indianapublicmedia.org/radio/

WFIU (103.7 FM) is a public radio station broadcasting from Indiana University Bloomington (IUB) in Bloomington, Indiana, United States. The station is a member station of NPR, Public Radio International and American Public Media. Together with IUB-owned television station WTIU (channel 30), it is known as Indiana Public Media. Studios are located in the Radio-Television Building on the IUB campus, and the transmitter is located at a site on South Sare Road in Bloomington. Seven translators broadcast WFIU and its second HD Radio subchannel, primarily in areas outside of the main transmitter's coverage area, including Terre Haute and Kokomo.

WFIU was established in 1950 and initially served as a training ground for IUB students. It moved to its present frequency in 1951 and was one of NPR's charter members.

== History ==
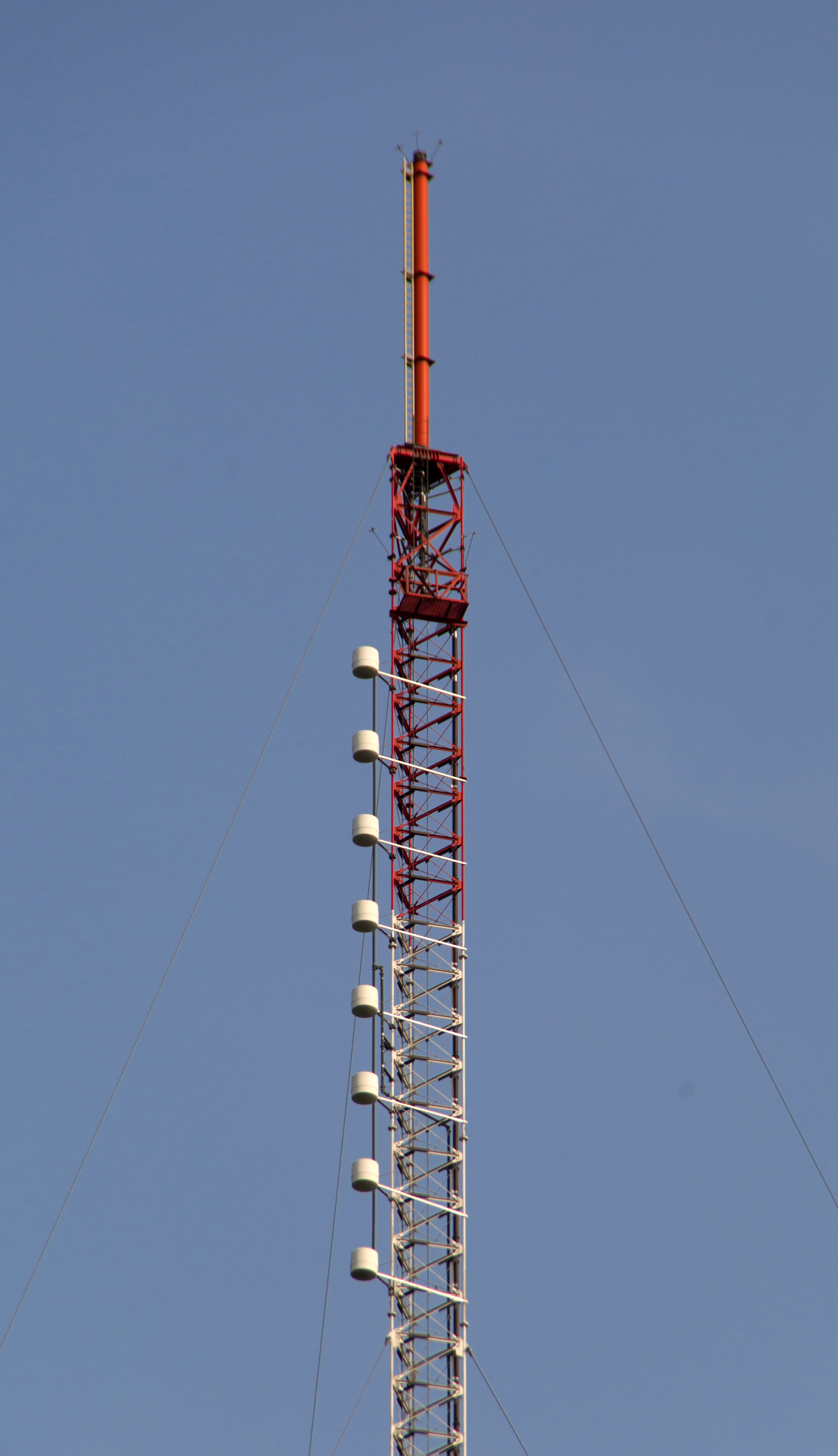
The WFIU–WTIU tower in Bloomington. The red panels at the top broadcast WTIU; the white radome-covered antennas below broadcast WFIU.

Indiana University had been producing radio programming since 1937, but it was not until 1942 that the university filed to established a radio station in the then-new FM service. The original application specified 42.9 MHz; after the FM band was changed to 88–108 MHz in 1945, IU amended its proposal to specify 91.9 MHz, in the noncommercial reserved portion of the new band, and the Federal Communications Commission (FCC) granted the application on March 27, 1947.

WFIU began broadcasting on September 30, 1950. While its launch was a landmark for the university, it heralded problems for some television viewers. Local station WFBM-TV broadcast on channel 6, and its audio was at 87.75 MHz, close to WFIU's frequency. Many early sets were not sensitive enough to prevent interference, resulting in viewers hearing WFIU while they watched WFBM-TV and a deluge of complaints to the university.

This problem would be solved by moving the station out of the reserved band. As it happened, there was an unused FM frequency in Bloomington. In June 1949, radio station WSUA had put WSUA-FM 103.7 on the air. However, its owners, three men from Louisville, Kentucky, were run out of business by the saturation of small Bloomington with three AM and one FM stations and a new newspaper all entering the market within the span of several years. They sold the physical plant and advertising contracts to Sarkes Tarzian, owner of station WTTS, and shut it down on January 5, 1950. In 1951, WFIU applied to move to 103.7 MHz; this was accepted.

The first studios of WFIU were a Quonset hut with a single hallway "that went through it like a bowling alley", according to Dick Bishop, a student announcer from 1959 to 1961 who later served as the development director for WFIU and WTIU, the IUB television station started in 1968. It functioned as a "laboratory station"; students produced and announced many of the programs, which were of a "local nature". One notable early WFIU product was sportscaster Dick Enberg. The Radio-Television Building on the IUB campus was completed in 1963, and the station began to take its modern direction with the launch of NPR in 1971; it was one of the initial 90 stations to carry All Things Considered. From 1960 until 1972, WFIU transmitted with an effective radiated power (ERP) of 75,000 watts from the center of the IU campus. At that time, it moved to the taller tower used by WTIU on the south side of Bloomington. The move increased WFIU's range, even though the power was reduced to 29,000 watts.

The combined WFIU-WTIU news team has won numerous journalism awards including Emmy and Edward R. Murrow Awards for its local television, radio and web reporting in Indiana.

In 2008, WFIU began HD Radio broadcasts and started a secondary service, "WFIU 2", which provides alternate public radio programs to complement WFIU's output.

== Nationally syndicated programs ==
- Afterglow - One hour program of jazz and American popular songs.
- Earth Eats - Hosted by Kayte Young
- Harmonia - A one-hour weekly program featuring early (e.g., Renaissance, medieval) music. Hosted by musician Angela Mariani and written by harpsichordist Bernard Gordillo.
- Kinsey Confidential - three-minute weekly program of sexual health information in partnership with the Kinsey Institute.
- A Moment of Science - Daily two-minute modules on various scientific topics.
- Night Lights - A one-hour weekly program of classic jazz hosted by David Brent Johnson.

== Translators ==
WFIU has five translators that extend its coverage and two that provide the HD2 service on analog radio:

- Terre Haute: W236AE (95.1 FM)
- Greensburg: W255BG (98.9 FM)
- Columbus: W264AL (100.7 FM)
- French Lick/West Baden: W269BU (101.7 FM)
- Kokomo: W291AM (106.1 FM)
- Seymour: W261CM (100.1 FM, rebroadcasts HD2)
- Bloomington: W270BH (101.9 FM, rebroadcasts HD2)
