= Pittsburgh Ballet Theatre =

Ballet company in Pittsburgh, Pennsylvania, USA

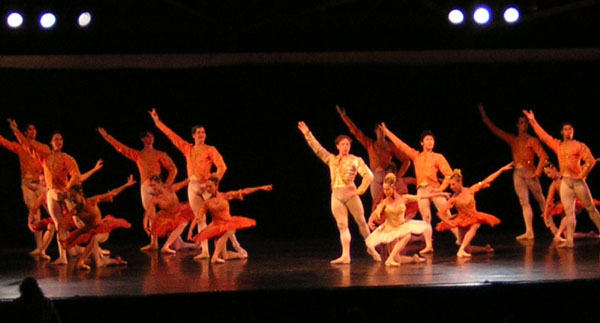

General information
- Name: Pittsburgh Ballet Theatre
- Year founded: November 19, 1969
- Founders: Loti Falk, Nicolas Petrov, Frederic Franklin
- Principal venue: Pittsburgh, Pennsylvania, United States
- Website: pbt.org

Artistic staff
- Artistic director: Adam McKinney

Other
- Associated schools: Pittsburgh Ballet Theatre School

The Pittsburgh Ballet Theatre (PBT) is an American professional ballet company based in the Strip District of Pittsburgh, Pennsylvania. It was founded in 1969.

== History ==
Pittsburgh Ballet Theatre is founded in 1969, by a Yugoslavian choreographer and Founding Artistic Director Nicolas Petrov, and Founding Board Chair Loti Falk. They initially met at an outdoor ballet performance featuring Petrov's Pittsburgh Playhouse dancers. They founded the Pittsburgh Ballet Theatre in 1969 in affiliation with Point Park College.

Following its 1969 stage debut at the Pittsburgh Playhouse, the Pittsburgh Ballet Theatre sold out its inaugural 1970-71 subscription season at the Syria Mosque, featuring Petrov's The Nutcracker and Swan Lake. In 1971 Loti and Leon Falk purchased the first studio space on the Boulevard of the Allies. By the end of the 1970s, the company was financially independent of Point Park College. When Petrov stepped down to focus on the Point Park program, John Gilpin, of London’s Festival Ballet, briefly led the company until Patrick Frantz, a former Paris Opera Ballet dancer, took over in 1978. In 1979, he established the Pittsburgh Ballet Theatre School.

During the 1981-82 Season, the Pittsburgh Ballet Theatre made its New York City debut and toured to 28 states, Canada and the Virgin Islands. In 1982, Loti Falk was appointed executive director and Patricia Wilde was appointed artistic director – a position she would hold for 15 years. In addition to works by George Balanchine, the Pittsburgh Ballet Theatre performed Don Quixote and premiered the first ballet rendition of The Great Gatsby. In the 1980s, the company launched their first Intensive Summer Program and established the Schenley Program for high school students. In 1984, Loti and Leon Falk gifted the company the Liberty Avenue studios which it currently occupies. In 1987: Loti Falk retired as executive director. Stephen Richard, founding Managing Director of the Los Angeles Theatre Center, became Managing Director and the Pittsburgh Ballet Theatre began performing at the Benedum Center for the Performing Arts.

During the 1990s, Patricia Wilde commissioned a total of 32 works. In 1991, Development Director Steven Libman was promoted to Managing Director and PBT completed a $1.5 million stabilization campaign. In 1993, the Pittsburgh Ballet Theatre launched a $18 million Campaign for Permanence to expand their endowment and improve facilities. The studios were renovated with the help of a $1.3M grant from the PA State Legislature. The company also premiered a new story ballet, The Mighty Casey, choreographed by Lisa DeRibere. In 1997, Terrence Orr was hired as Artistic Director. A former ABT principal dancer, Orr had visited the Company in the 80's to set Rodeo and other works from the ABT repertory.

In 2000, Orr, in conjunction with Libman, began a series of commissions for contemporary ballets inspired by American music, including artists such as: Ray Brown, Stanley Turrentine, Lena Horne, Billy Strayhorn, Sting, Bruce Springsteen and Paul Simon. In 2002, Orr premiered his Pittsburgh-inspired production of The Nutcracker. In 2003, the company's endowment reached $9.4 million and in June 2004 Steven Libman stepped down as Managing Director. In 2006, Harris N. Ferris was named executive director and the Pittsburgh Ballet Theatre began a fundraising campaign to restore the ballet orchestra.

In June 2020 Orr retired as Artistic Director. Susan Jaffee, former ABT Ballet Master, assumed the role of Artistic Director in 2020 and resigned in December 2022 to become the Artistic Director of American Ballet Theatre. Harris Ferris resigned as Executive Director in June 2022 after a 15 year tenure. In March 2023 Adam W. McKinney was appointed Artistic Director.

== Pittsburgh Ballet Theatre School ==
The Pittsburgh Ballet Theatre established its school in 1979 with class offerings for beginning, intermediate and advanced dancers. It launched its Intensive Summer Program in 1980.

PBT School enrolls more than 1,000 students annually across its Children's, Student, Pre-professional divisions. The Pre-professional Division includes both part-time and full-time high school programs. The Graduate Program provides advanced training to high school graduates who are preparing to audition for professional positions.

The school presents four student productions each spring at Point Park University's PNC Theatre. The Spring Performances feature 200+ dancers of the Student and Pre-Professional divisions onstage. Students can also audition for and perform in PBT's main-stage productions.
