= Elliott Hall of Music =

Concert hall and theater at Purdue University in Indiana, United States

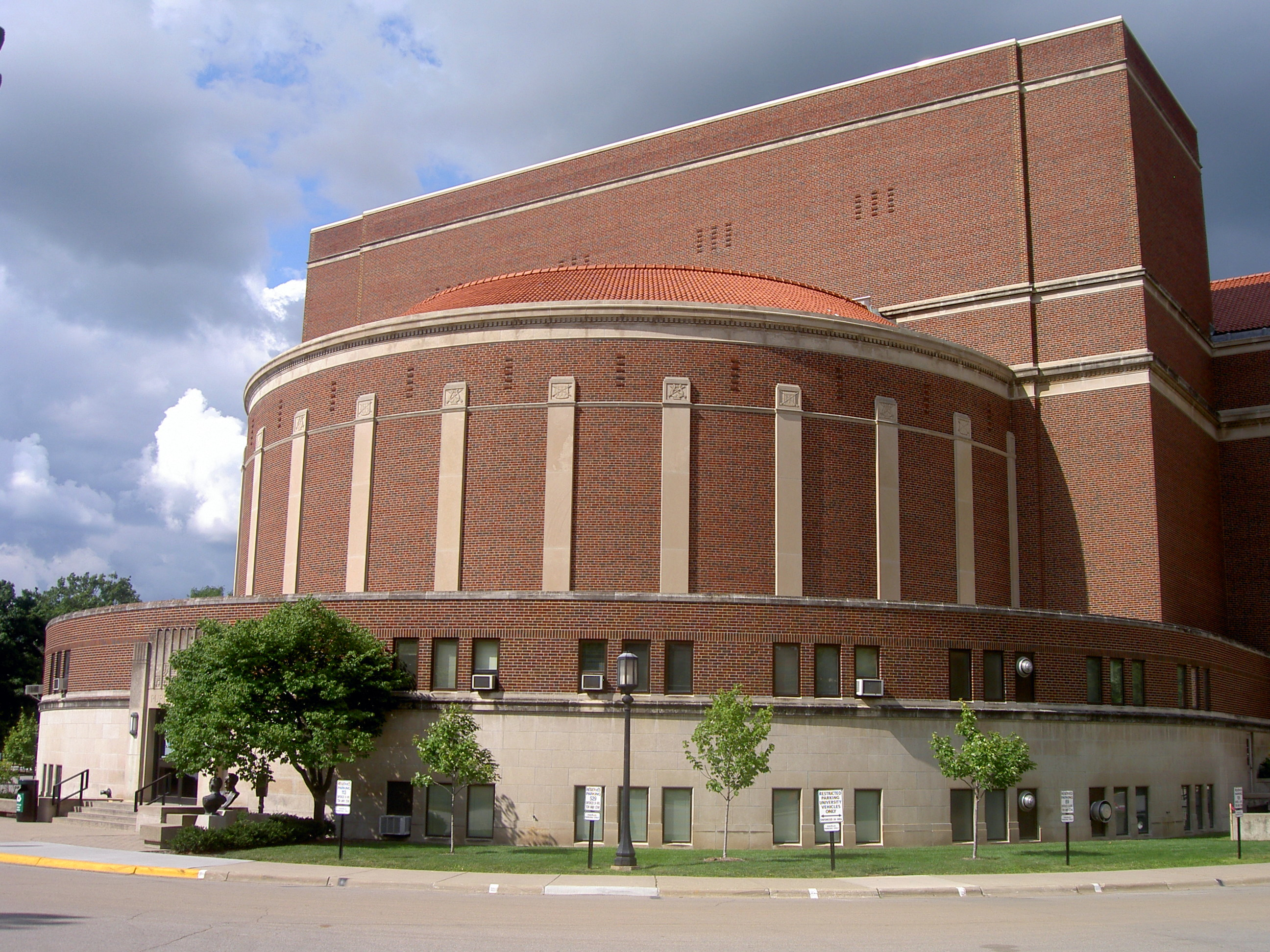
- Interactive map of Elliott Hall of Music
- Former names: Purdue Hall of Music (1940-1958)
- Location: 712 3rd St. West Lafayette, Indiana 47907
- Coordinates: 40.4279°N 86.9149°W
- Owner: Purdue University
- Seating type: Reserved
- Capacity: 6,005
- Type: Indoor theatre

Construction
- Groundbreaking: October 24, 1938
- Opened: May 3, 1940

Website
- purdue.edu/hallofmusic

The Elliott Hall of Music is a theater located on the campus of Purdue University in West Lafayette, Indiana. With a seating capacity of 6,005, it is one of the largest proscenium theaters in the world, and is 45 seats larger than Radio City Music Hall. The facility is named after Edward C. Elliott (1874–1960), who was president of Purdue University from 1922 to 1945. The stage of the hall is one of the largest in the country. It is roughly the same size as the stage of the Dolby Theatre in Hollywood, California.

Elliott Hall of Music is host to several annual performing arts events presented by Purdue Convocations such as national Broadway tours, popular musical artists, comedians, dance companies, orchestras, lecturers, and more. Over the years, it has hosted many notable performing artists and lecturers, including Diana Ross & the Supremes (1968), Bob Dylan (1981 and other years), Pearl Jam (1994), Lady Gaga (2010), Mark Morris Dance Group, Saint Petersburg Philharmonic Orchestra, Robin Williams (2008), Neil deGrasse Tyson, and the 14th Dalai Lama.

The hall was designed by Walter Scholer, assisted by consulting architect J. André Fouilhoux (who was also one of the architects for New York's Radio City Music Hall). Construction began in October 1938 and was completed on May 2, 1940, at a cost of US$1.205 million. The facility was dedicated as the "Purdue Hall of Music" on May 3–4, 1940, and was renamed in honor of Elliott in 1958. Two sets of three allegorical sculptures complete the two primary facades and were designed by Jon Magnus Jonson (1893–1947).

The Elliott Hall of Music is connected to Hovde Hall, Purdue University's administration building, by a walkway on the second floor. This arrangement allows for the use of the formal entry and receiving hall in the administration building (otherwise not used at nights and weekends when performances are typically held) to serve the Hall of Music, saving both cost and space during the depression era construction.

During spring commencement exercises, students process up the staircase in front of Hovde Hall and go through the walkway into the Hall of Music where the ceremony is held. For winter commencement exercises, students enter the Hall of Music through the Purdue Bands entrance located behind the stage, where they proceed under the structure and to the rear of the auditorium where they enter, as this entrance is much closer to the building where candidates are marshaled for the procession.

Locally, the building is informally known as Elliott Hall or the Hall of Music. Evening exams for large, multi-section classes (e.g. Introductory Calculus, Principles of Accounting) are often scheduled in Elliott Hall of Music. In a typical exam seating arrangement (every other seat occupied), Elliott can handle about 3000 students during one exam.

Elliott Hall of Music contains the offices of Purdue Convocations, the WBAA and WBAA-FM studios, and Hall of Music Productions, the department which provides facility management and box office services for the Hall of Music, as well as production services throughout the Purdue campus.

Music acts and comedians that have performed at Elliott Hall include: Indy's Ink Spots (1952), Chicago's Nat King Cole (1963), Count Basie (1966), Bob Hope (1968), The Temptations (1970), Beach Boys (1972), Elton John (1979), Tom Petty and the Heartbreakers (1979), Chicago's Muddy Waters (1981), Ella Fitzgerald (1981), Vincennes's Red Skelton (1981), Chicago (1982), Jimmy Buffett (1983), Chicago's Styx (1983), Bloomington's John Mellencamp (1984, and in '80, '99, and '06), Eddie Murphy (1985), Tina Turner (1987), R.E.M. (1987), Chicago's Bob Newhart (1987), Sting (1988), Illinois' Cheap Trick (1988), The Bangles (1989), Duran Duran (1994), Pearl Jam (1994), Stone Temple Pilots (1997), Adam Sandler (1997), Chicago's Smashing Pumpkins (2000), No Doubt (2002), Dave Matthews & Tim Reynolds (2003), John Mayer (2004), Dave Chappelle (2004), Chicago's Wilco (2006), Bob Saget (2007), Robin Williams (2008), Katy Perry (2009), Lady Gaga (2010), Snoop Dogg (2010), Avicii (2012), Garrison Keillor (2012), "Weird Al" Yankovic (2013), Parks and Recreation's Nick Offerman (2014), Brad Paisley (2015), Panic! at the Disco (2016), Kentucky's Cage the Elephant (2017), Lafayette's Jeremy Camp (2018), Blue Man Group (2020), and Noah Kahan (2023).
