= WNDY (FM) =

WFYI public radio station in Crawfordsville, Indiana, United States

- Crawfordsville, Indiana; United States
- Frequency: 91.3 MHz

Programming
- Format: Public radio
- Affiliations: National Public Radio

Ownership
- Owner: Wabash College; (Wabash College Radio, Inc.)

History
- First air date: 1997
- Former call signs: WAQN (1997)

Technical information
- Licensing authority: FCC
- Facility ID: 81314
- Class: A
- ERP: 2,200 watts
- HAAT: 59 meters (194 ft)
- Transmitter coordinates: 40°03′19″N 86°55′57″W

Links
- Public license information: Public file; LMS
- Website: www.wfyi.org

WNDY (91.3 FM) is a college radio station in Crawfordsville, Indiana, owned and operated by Wabash College. The station simulcasts the Indianapolis NPR station WFYI-FM.

The station is not related to the similarly called television station, WNDY-TV in Indianapolis, which is owned by Circle City Broadcasting.
