= WICR =

- Indianapolis, Indiana; United States
- Broadcast area: Indianapolis metropolitan area
- Frequency: 88.7 MHz (HD Radio)
- Branding: The Diamond

Programming
- Format: Classical music and jazz
- Subchannels: HD2: Jazz and Classical; HD3: Contemporary hits
- Affiliations: Classical Music Indy; APM; PRX

Ownership
- Owner: University of Indianapolis

History
- First air date: August 20, 1962
- Call sign meaning: Indiana Central University Radio (from the school's original name)

Technical information
- Licensing authority: FCC
- Facility ID: 69115
- Class: B
- ERP: 8,000 watts
- HAAT: 209 meters (686 ft)
- Transmitter coordinates: 39.894°N 86.206°W

Links
- Public license information: Public file; LMS
- Webcast: Listen live; Listen live (HD2); Listen live (HD3)
- Website: wicronline.org/wicrfm/

WICR (88.7 FM) is a noncommercial educational radio station licensed to Indianapolis, Indiana, United States, serving the Indianapolis metropolitan area. Owned by the University of Indianapolis via the University of Indianapolis Board of Trustees, it broadcasts a mixed jazz and classical music format: on weekdays, classical music is heard from midnight to noon, while jazz is heard afternoons and evenings. On weekends, the station programs a mix of jazz, classical and other musical genres. The studios and offices are located in Esch Hall on East Hanna Avenue.

WICR's transmitter is on Walnut Street near 79th Street. WICR also broadcasts in HD Radio: the second digital subchannel is a reverse of the usual weekday programming, with jazz in overnights and mornings, and classical in afternoons and evenings. The third subchannel carries a contemporary hits format. In addition, the station streams its programming online.

== History ==
On August 20, 1962, the station first signed on the air. The call sign represents the original name of the school, Indiana Central University Radio. At first, WICR was powered at 10 watts, only able to cover the campus and a few adjacent neighborhoods. Dean Ransburg was the chairman of the school's radio committee and Phillip C. Roberts served as the general manager. In that era, Barbara Benn was a rare female program director. The station aired a mix of classical, jazz and educational programs as well as student free form rock shows.

Over time, the power was increased and WICR's transmitter was relocated to one of the highest points in Indianapolis. In 2004, the station began broadcasting using HD Radio technology. WICR is a student-operated radio station overseen by full-time university faculty/staff as well as a student management team. Students enrolled in the Applied Radio course at the university are responsible for weekly shifts, producing shows, sports broadcasting, and updating the web site and social media.

== Signal coverage ==
The station's main signal extends from northern Monroe County, to parts of Columbus, Muncie and West Lafayette, and in some parts of Marion, Indiana.

== Programming ==
WICR features classical music and jazz programming. The weekday schedule consists of classical music overnight and in the morning hours, with jazz in the afternoon and evening. University of Indianapolis students are on the air during the jazz programming. Classical music programming on the station is supplied by locally based non-profit Classical Music Indy and national syndicators.

The station also features locally produced music, arts, and community programs, as well as sports. WICR broadcasts all University of Indianapolis football and basketball games, either on 88.7 FM or on wicronline.org

== Events ==
WICR is involved in a number of events throughout the year. Several weeks during the fall and spring, WICR conducts a listener fundraising drive to help support the station's operations. In the spring, WICR also hosts a jazz festival on the University of Indianapolis campus. During the fall, WICR has a large presence at Indy Jazz Fest, an annual festival held in Indianapolis. WICR also participates in various other jazz festivals and concerts held around the city during the summer.
