= Thomas Building =

Former high-rise building in Indianapolis, Indiana, US

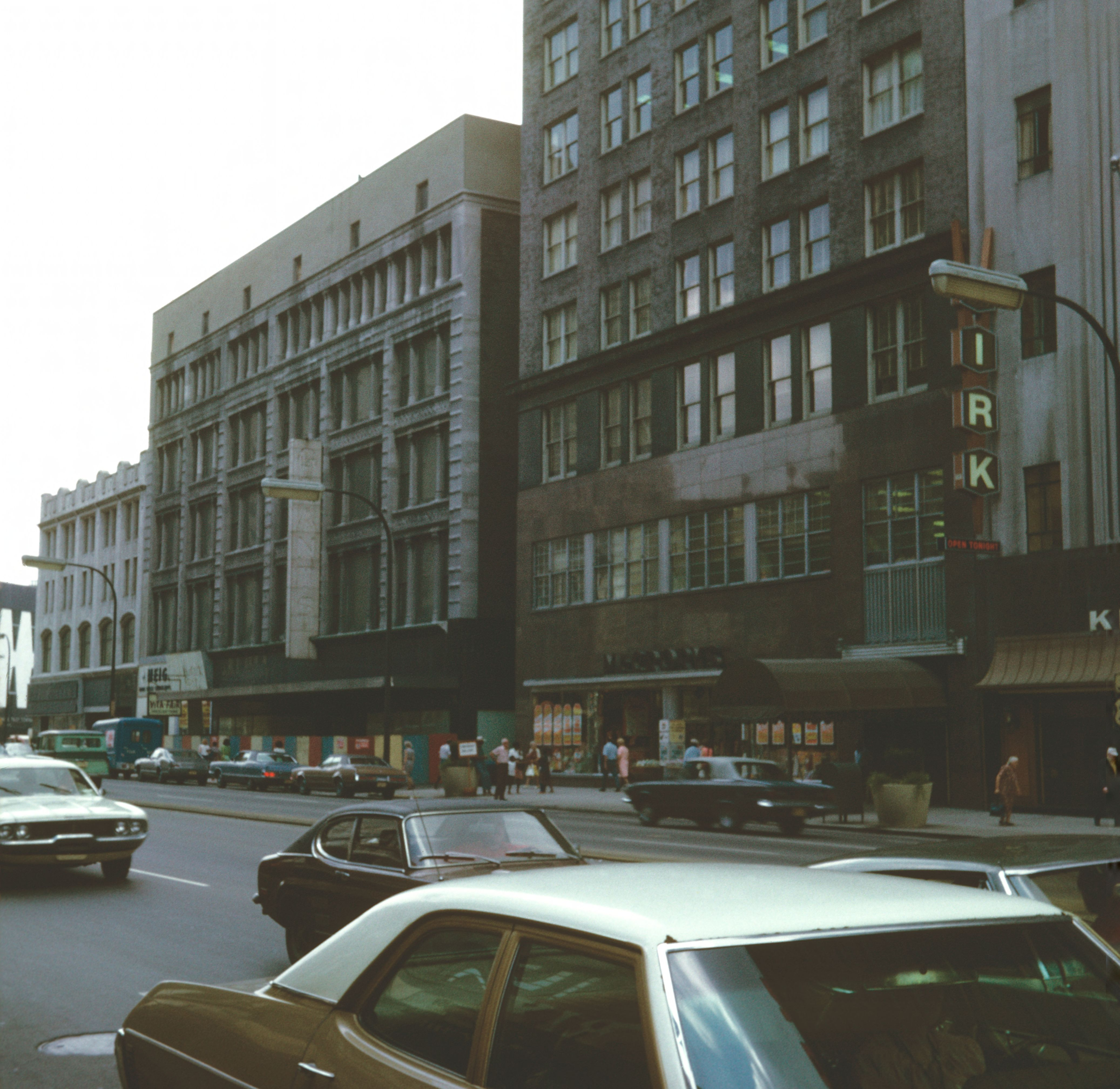
- Thomas Building in 1973 (right of center)

General information
- Status: Destroyed
- Type: Office
- Location: 15 E. Washington St., Indianapolis, Indiana, United States
- Coordinates: 39.7666°N 86.1572°W
- Completed: 1895
- Destroyed: November 5, 1973 (fire)

Height
- Roof: 170 ft (52 m)

Technical details
- Floor count: 13

Thomas Building was a high rise building in Indianapolis, Indiana. It was completed in 1895 and had 13 floors. It was primarily used for office space. It was heavily damaged in the W. T. Grant fire on November 5, 1973, and subsequently demolished.

== See also ==
- List of tallest buildings in Indianapolis
