= Pittsburgh Science and Technology Academy =

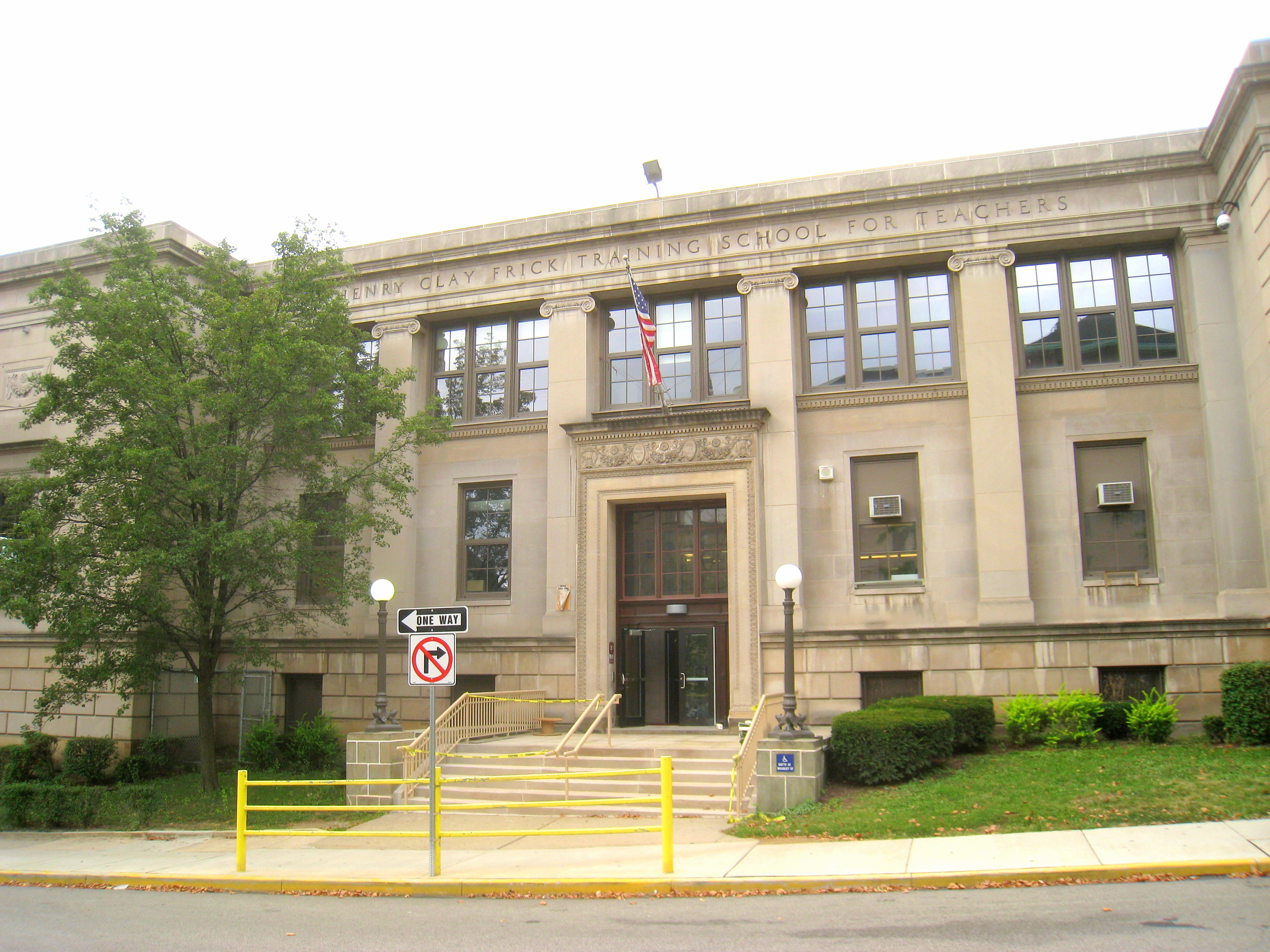
- 107 Thackeray Street; Pittsburgh, Pennsylvania 15213; United States

Information
- Type: Public - Magnet
- Motto: Dream. Discover. Design.
- Established: 2009
- School district: Pittsburgh Public Schools
- Principal: Dr. Shavonne Johnson (2024-present)
- Staff: 66
- Grades: 6–12
- Enrollment: 616 (as of October 1, 2022)
- Colors: White and blue
- Mascot: Sci-Tech Thundersharks
- Newspaper: The Byte (retired), The Sextant (Future)
- Affiliation: USO (U-Prep, SciTech, Obama) Sports
- Website: Pittsburgh Science and Technology
- Henry Clay Frick Training School for Teachers
- U.S. National Register of Historic Places
- Pittsburgh Landmark – PHLF
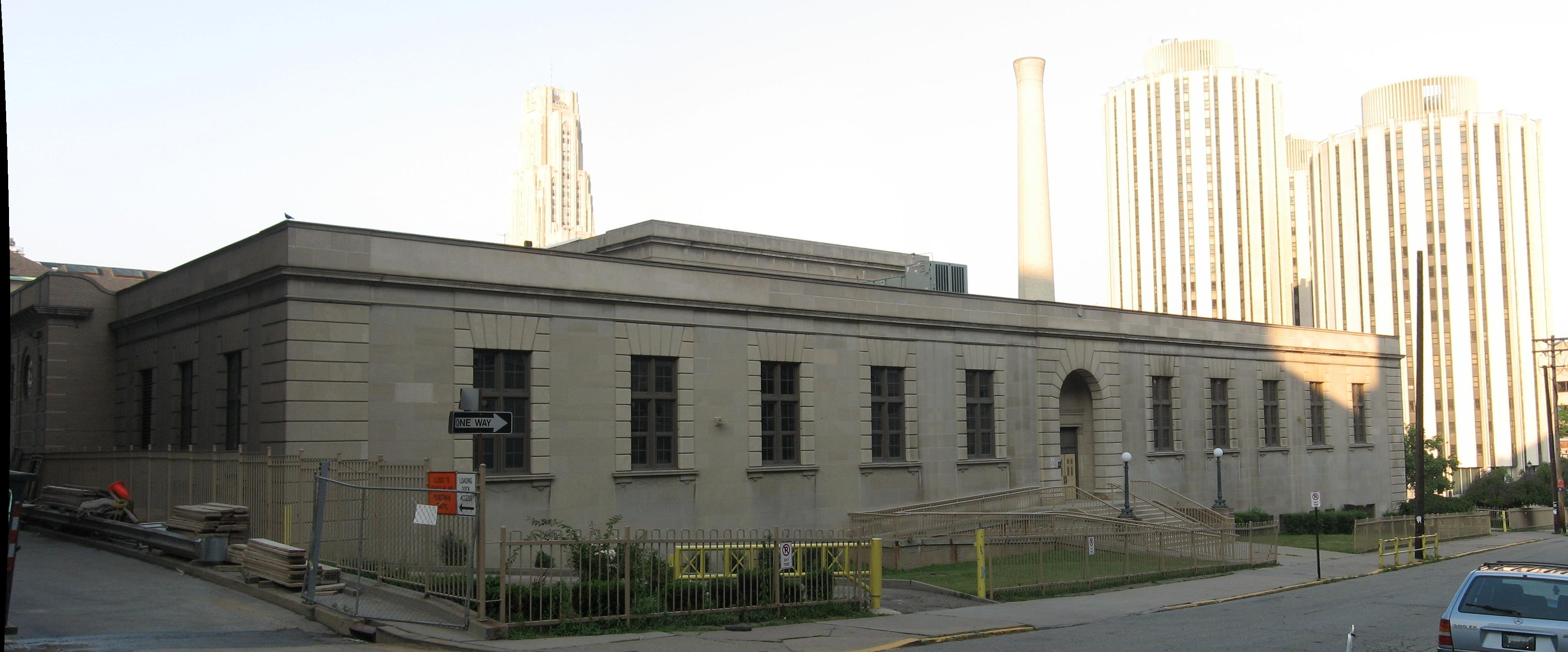
- View from S Bouquet Street
- Coordinates: 40°26′36″N 79°57′29″W
- Area: 1 acre (0.40 ha)
- Built: 1927
- Architect: Ingham & Boyd
- Architectural style: Classical Revival
- MPS: Pittsburgh Public Schools TR
- NRHP reference No.: 86002668

Significant dates
- Added to NRHP: September 30, 1986
- Designated PHLF: 2002

Pittsburgh Science and Technology Academy (sometimes referred to as SciTech) is a public school in the Oakland neighborhood of Pittsburgh, Pennsylvania, United States. It currently serves grades 6-12 in the Pittsburgh Public Schools. SciTech's first graduating class of seniors was 2013. Its building was listed on the National Register of Historic Places on September 30, 1986.

== History ==
Originally the building served as the home for the Henry Clay Frick Training School for Teachers, founded by Henry Clay Frick in 1927, which served a training school for teachers. In 1983 it became a middle school housed at Dilworth School in the Pittsburgh neighborhood of East Liberty. Pittsburgh Frick 6–8 Middle School moved to the building in 1986 and was temporarily located at Reizenstein which in 2012 was renamed the Barack Obama Academy of International Studies 6-8. and has since been demolished. The Barack Obama Academy of International Studies 6-12 is now located in the former Peabody High School building in East Liberty. In June 2009, staff working on The Pittsburgh Science and Technology Academy received possession of the Frick International Studies Academy building. SciTech officially opened to students in September 2009 after a pilot project by graduate students at Carnegie Mellon Heinz College.

== Operating schedule ==
Pittsburgh SciTech offers a block-schedule of classes; this structure allows students 80-minute classes. Field trips to local attractions in the Oakland area are plentiful and make use of local libraries, museums, universities, and seasonal attractions. Additionally, students are given 40 minutes a day to entertain themselves in a list of activities which are not school related, this is called Activity Period. This practice was suspended for the beginning of the 2021-2022 school year due to COVID-19, but was later reinstated.

== Concentrations ==
Pittsburgh Science and Technology Academy offers four fields of science for students to focus on. These fields, named "Concentrations", are split into the following categories:

- Computers and connections
- Body and behavior
- Form and function
- Environment and energy

These sub-categories cover a wide range of careers and offer early experience in classes they would not study otherwise. Students pick their concentration at the end of their Ninth-grade year. The pickings are chosen in a weighted lottery, biased on grades, behavior, and attendance.

=== Computers and connections ===
The Computers and Connections concentration focuses on teaching students computational thinking, breaking hard problems up into easier steps.

=== Body and behavior ===
In the body and behavior concentration, students focus on aspects of health and science. Students are given accelerated teaching about different professions and health careers.

=== Form and function ===
Form and Function focuses on engineering and its various aspects.

=== Environment and energy ===
Environment and Energy instructs students about Environment and Energy in the form of firsthand activities in Panther Hollow creek and elsewhere and learning about the aspects of each.

== Enrollment ==
As of 2022:

Group	Number of students	Percent
All	616	100%
Caucasian	296	48%
African American	234	37.9%
Asian	21	3.4%
Hispanic	19	3.08%
Multiracial	44	7.14%
American Indian	<5	<1%
Pacific Islander	<5	<1%
Male	396	64%
Female	220	36%
