= WTIU =

Television station in Bloomington, Indiana

- Bloomington–Indianapolis, Indiana; United States
- City: Bloomington, Indiana
- Channels: Digital: 33 (UHF); Virtual: 30

Programming
- Affiliations: 30.1: PBS; For others, see § Subchannels

Ownership
- Owner: Indiana University; (The Trustees of Indiana University)
- Sister stations: WFIU

History
- First air date: March 3, 1969
- Former channel numbers: Analog: 30 (UHF, 1969–2009); Digital: 14 (UHF, 2003–2019)
- Former affiliations: NET (1969–1970)
- Call sign meaning: Television Indiana University

Technical information
- Licensing authority: FCC
- Facility ID: 66536
- ERP: 797 kW
- HAAT: 219 m (719 ft)
- Transmitter coordinates: 39°8′31″N 86°29′42.9″W

Links
- Public license information: Public file; LMS
- Website: ipm.org/tv/

WTIU (channel 30) is a PBS member television station in Bloomington, Indiana, United States. It is owned by Indiana University (IU) alongside NPR member WFIU (103.7 FM); the two stations together are known as Indiana Public Media. The two stations share studios on the Indiana University campus on East 7th Street in Bloomington; WTIU's transmitter is located on Sare Road on the city's southeast side. The station provides primary service to Bloomington, Bedford, and Columbus and also is the nearest PBS station to Terre Haute.

IU obtained a construction permit for a television station in 1963 but did not put it on the air until 1969. In 1973, the opera Myshkin, produced by WTIU, won the station a Peabody Award. The station airs PBS and other public television programming as well as a weekly newsmagazine, Indiana Newsdesk.

== History ==
On June 8, 1961, Indiana University (IU) applied to the Federal Communications Commission (FCC) for a construction permit to build a new educational television station on channel 30 in Bloomington. At the time, IU proposed to broadcast two hours every evening with college credit, educational, and other programs and to use the station to train students. The application, as amended, specified a transmitter site on Sare Road southeast of Bloomington. The FCC granted the permit on August 8, 1963, and IU then applied for federal grants to finance construction. The permit languished until, in 1966, the IU board of trustees authorized purchasing equipment for the station. Bloomington's commercial TV station, WTTV (channel 4), offered IU use of its tower at Trafalgar but only if WTTV was permitted to build a new tower in Indianapolis. IU received the grant in March 1967; by this time, IU was already originating programming for closed-circuit transmission to its downtown center in Indianapolis and the IU medical center, and two organizations relating to instructional television were headquartered at the university. Donley Feddersen, who directed radio and television at IU until his death in 1979, had previously served as the director of television programming at National Educational Television (NET).

Ground was broken on the Sare Road transmitter site on October 10, 1968, and equipment tests began on February 13, 1969. WTIU began regular programming on March 3, 1969, to viewers within 40 miles (64 km) of the transmitter. At sign-on, it was an NET member station; in 1970, PBS replaced the NET network. Programming aired six nights a week on evenings, with network shows in color but no facilities for live local color programming; the studios were not equipped to originate color telecasts until 1974. In 1973, WTIU produced the hour-long opera Myshkin, composed by John Eaton and distributed nationally on NET Opera Theater. The presentation won the station a Peabody Award.

When the Great Blizzard of 1978 struck, the Daily Herald-Telephone newspaper published but was unable to deliver nearly all of its issues owing to the snowstorm. Newspaper staffers made it to the IU campus to read their news and sports stories—as well as the comics—on the air to snowbound viewers. The station's broadcast day expanded to more than 15 hours, seven days a week by 1979, by which time it produced more local public affairs programs. In the mid-1980s, it lost access to cable systems in several central Indiana communities, most notably Indianapolis, that replaced it with other services or believed its programming was redundant to WFYI. Even in Columbus, the local cable provider considered replacing WTIU with WFYI because of signal reception issues. WTIU scheduled PBS programming in such a way as to counterprogram WFYI.

In 1999, WTIU launched a weekly local children's show, The Friday Zone. It consisted of educational segments wrapped around PBS children's programming with a local audience. The program was hosted by Holly Gregory from 1999 to 2003; during this time, WTIU began distributing it to WFYI. In later years, the screenwriter Chad Quandt hosted while a student at IU. By 2021, it was distributed to most of the state on seven PBS stations.

IU fired the executive director and chief financial officer of Indiana University Radio and Television Services in September 2024. An outside consultant had found "morale issues" among station staff. After the firing, operation of the stations was moved within The Media School at IU, though they would remain editorially independent.

== Local programming ==
In 2013, WTIU debuted a weekly newsmagazine, Indiana Newsdesk. The program originated after WTIU and WFIU combined their news efforts, which included newsbreaks on television and an existing radio newsroom.

== Technical information and subchannels ==
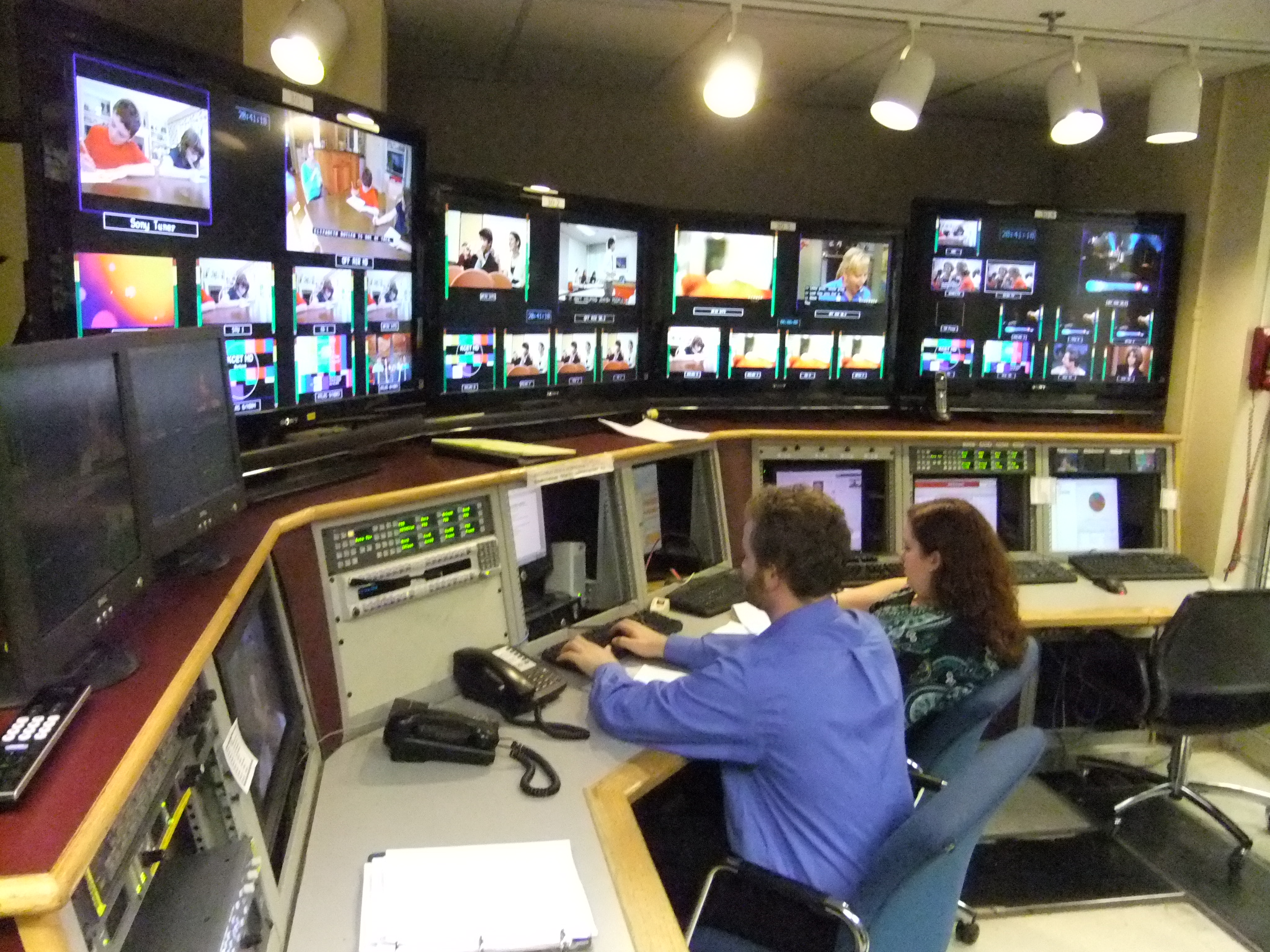
Inside WTIU master control

WTIU's transmitter is located on Sare Road on the southeast side of Bloomington. The station's signal is multiplexed:

Subchannels of WTIU
Subchannel	Res.	Short name	Programming
30.1	720p	WTIU-HD	PBS
30.2	480i	World	World
30.3	480i	Create	Create
30.4	480i	PBSKids	PBS Kids
30.5	480i	PBSKids	PBS Kids

WTIU began broadcasting a digital signal on channel 14 on May 20, 2003. The digital conversion required the construction of a new mast at the Sare Road site to accommodate the increased weight of analog and digital transmitters. The station shut down its analog signal, over UHF channel 30, on June 12, 2009, the official date on which full-power television in the United States transitioned from analog to digital broadcasts under federal mandate. Its digital signal continued to broadcast on its pre-transition UHF channel 14, using virtual channel 30.
