= W. T. Grant fire =

1973 fire in Indianapolis

W.T. Grant fire
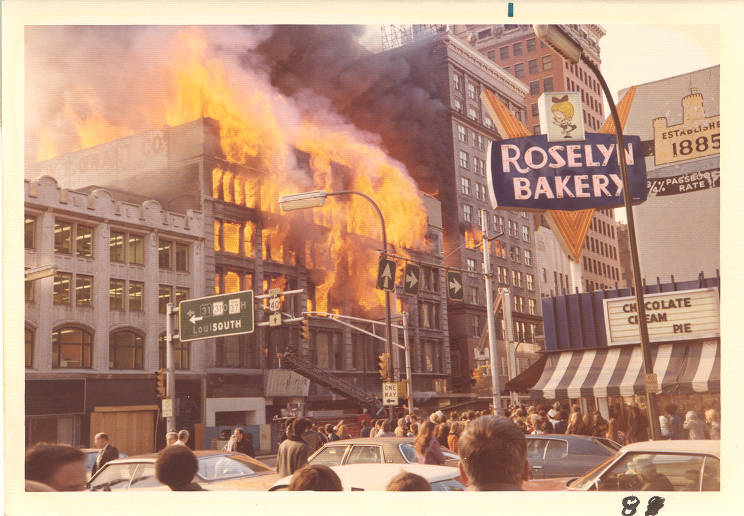
- The W.T. Grant building ablaze, with the Thomas Building (grey) and the Merchants Bank Building (red) in the background.
- Date: November 5, 1973
- Time: 12:47 pm
- Location: 37 E. Washington Street, Indianapolis, Indiana, U.S.; 39°46′0″N 86°9′25″W
- Cause: Unknown
- Deaths: 0
- Injuries: Unknown
- Property damage: ~$15 million (1973)

The W. T. Grant fire was a major conflagration in downtown Indianapolis, Indiana, U.S. It began in the early afternoon hours of November 5, 1973. It was one of the most extensive and costliest commercial fires in the city's history, totaling at around $15 million (1973) worth of damages, and affected 15 buildings and 84 individual businesses with the resulting fire or water damage.

== Background ==
The W. T. Grant building in downtown Indianapolis was located on the south side of Washington Street between Meridian Street and Pennsylvania Street. The building consisted of five stories and was built in the late 1910s after a devastating fire had destroyed the previous building. The store had opened in the early 1910s as the company was expanding and stayed in business until 1971 when it closed as a result of declining business and the rise of newer, more popular local stores in the area. The building was scheduled for demolition in December 1973 or January 1974, with preparations starting as early as September. At the time of the fire, there were several tanks of propane in the building, as well as a small homeless population that had taken refuge inside. The Thomas Building next door was several floors taller, made up mostly of office space. On the side of the Thomas building opposite the W.T. Grant was Kirk's Furniture and the Merchants National Bank Building (later renamed the Barnes and Thornburg Building), which was occupied by office space and a jeweler housing a large oxygen tank.

== The fire ==
In the early afternoon of November 5, 1973, at 12:47 pm, the first call was made to the Indianapolis Fire Department by an office worker in the neighboring Thomas Building reporting smoke coming from the fourth floor. Various other calls were made in short succession thereafter, with the first engine companies arriving three minutes after the initial call. The first firefighters on-scene reported heavy smoke showing from the building, prompting a second alarm at 12:52 p.m.

At 12:56 p.m., the first of several calls were received reporting that the fire had spread to the Thomas Building next door. Several more alarms were declared in rapid succession, resulting in a peak of nearly 200 firefighters on the scene. As the buildings continued burning over the next ten minutes, embers blown by heavy winds landed atop the Merchants Bank Building and the Washington Hotel across the street, igniting fires on the rooftops. The rapidly-moving fire prompted fire watches to be established to spot other rooftop ignitions, including in an overhead helicopter and atop the City-County Building.

Sometime after 1 p.m., the propane tanks within the Grant building ignited, causing a collapse that brought down all of the structure's interior and roof, leaving only the front wall standing. The collapse greatly diminished the fire's size and intensity. The remaining fires were extinguished a few hours after, at around 3 p.m.

== Aftermath ==
The fire left behind a smoldering Thomas Building and the destroyed remains of the W. T. Grant structure, as well as severe water damage to the surrounding businesses stemming from runoff of the 4 million US gallons (15,000,000 L; 3,300,000 imp gal) of water used during the event. The damage done was estimated at $15 million (~$93 million in 2021). What remained of the building was quickly demolished, and when plans never materialized for a new structure, the property was converted into a parking lot. The neighboring Thomas Building was found to be unsaveable, and was demolished along with the remains of the Grant building and made into an accompanying parking area. The Kirk Furniture building and the Merchants Bank Building were eventually renovated and are still standing as of 2021.
