= WFYI (TV) =

Television station in Indianapolis

- 1630 North Meridian Street in 2001. WFYI would complete its move to the building in 2008.
- Indianapolis, Indiana; United States
- Channels: Digital: 21 (UHF); Virtual: 20

Programming
- Affiliations: 20.1: PBS; 20.2: PBS Kids; 20.3: Create

Ownership
- Owner: Metropolitan Indianapolis Public Media, Inc.
- Sister stations: WFYI-FM

History
- First air date: October 4, 1970
- Former channel numbers: Analog: 20 (UHF, 1970–2009)
- Call sign meaning: "For Your Information"

Technical information
- Licensing authority: FCC
- Facility ID: 41397
- ERP: 225 kW
- HAAT: 251 m (823 ft)
- Transmitter coordinates: 39°53′56.9″N 86°12′02.4″W

Links
- Public license information: Public file; LMS
- Website: www.wfyi.org

WFYI (channel 20) is a PBS member television station in Indianapolis, Indiana, United States. It is owned by Metropolitan Indianapolis Public Media, Inc. alongside NPR member WFYI-FM (90.1). The two stations share studios between Pierson and Illinois Streets (using a North Meridian Street address) north of downtown Indianapolis, within the city's Television Row section. The TV station's transmitter is located on West 79th Street and Township Line Road on the city's northwest side (near Meridian Hills).

After a years-long fight to start public television, much delayed by competing tower site plans proposed by commercial stations, WFYI debuted on October 4, 1970. Its foundation was supported by a women-led fundraising drive to raise the first year's operating expenses. In addition to airing PBS and other public television programs, WFYI also produces programs of local and regional interest.

== History ==
=== Prologue ===
Channel 20 was allocated for non-commercial educational use in Indianapolis by the Federal Communications Commission in 1952; however, in 1958, I. Lynd Esch, the president of Indiana Central College, now the University of Indianapolis, asked the FCC to allocate channel 13, then in a disputed application process, for educational use. Esch believed channel 20 would never be used because it was in the ultra high frequency (UHF) band and not all homes could receive it. A booster group, the Indianapolis Committee for Educational Television, was formed in 1960, with the idea of bringing in educational programming from Indiana University for broadcast or possibly supporting a station to be built by Butler University or Indiana Central College. Butler applied for channel 20 in September 1962, though it admitted at the time that its plans were incomplete.

At the end of 1965, the Metropolitan Indianapolis Television Association, a new group headed by Esch, applied for channel 20. At the same time, WTTV in Bloomington sought permission to move its transmitter to a site in Indianapolis, which it would share with the new educational station alongside other donations by WTTV founder and owner Sarkes Tarzian; studios would be on the Indiana Central campus. The idea of sharing the tower with WTTV and a second proposed commercial independent station for Indianapolis was part of a leverage strategy to try and convince the FCC to let WTTV move its facility from Bloomington, where it had been at a disadvantage to the Indianapolis network affiliates.

Two of the Indianapolis network affiliates—WISH-TV and WLWI—then made a counter-offer to the television association in 1967 to permit the use of one of their towers and provide $350,000 in equipment, noting that the WTTV tower move condition was a hindrance to approving channel 20. WTTV responded by sweetening its proposal, stating that it would offer the use of the existing WTTV mast at Trafalgar to Indiana University, which was in the process of building WTIU (channel 30). The effect was to mire the establishment of channel 20 in a dispute between commercial stations.

In June 1967, the FCC rejected WTTV's proposed relocation. The application sat in limbo, but progress was reported by October, even though the channel 20 proposals had to be amended to specify a new tower site. Plans firmed up in early 1968 with the appointment of a general manager; the selection of WISH-TV's tower for the channel 20 antenna; and proposals to use studios of the Christian Theological Seminary as well as equipment donated by WISH, WLWI, and WFBM-TV. In July, the amended application was mailed to the FCC, but another problem bogged down approval. The new WISH tower was objected to by WLFI in Lafayette, Indiana. Like WISH, WLFI was a CBS affiliate, and WLFI feared that WISH would encroach on its territory to its detriment. During this time, WTIU began broadcasting in March 1969, but Indianapolis was still the largest city in the nation without an educational station. Richard K. Shull, television columnist of The Indianapolis News, criticized local residents that had not moved to Indianapolis from elsewhere for not understanding the benefits of such a station and demonstrating "monumental apathy and rampaging lassitude". Mayor Richard Lugar formed a group to raise funds to sustain operations and receive a matching grant.

=== Construction and launch ===
After meeting its fundraising deadline and modifying its application to specify a tower owned by WFBM-TV, thereby bypassing the WISH tower dispute, the impasse finally broke at the end of June 1969. The FCC granted the construction permit on June 26, and a federal facility grant was approved days later. By October, there were call letters—WFYI—and facilities, but no fund drive had yet been slated to raise $350,000 needed to finance the first year of operational expenses, raising the prospect that nothing would come of all the effort. When Sesame Street debuted nationally that fall, WLWI aired the series until WFYI could begin broadcasting.

We're here because men couldn't get the job done. The men have been batting this thing around since 1951 and it's about time for them to give up.

— Ardath Burkhart

Early 1970 was spent raising funds to put WFYI into service. A major effort was mounted starting on March 1, involving more than 9,000 women selling charter memberships door-to-door; churches announcing the fund drive from their pulpits; and the organization of a fundraising auction. That day, WLWI aired a 30-minute sampler of educational programs. Response to the door-to-door effort was reported to be greater than anticipated, but a lack of knowledge of educational TV programming and bad weather worked against it. Within a month, the group, led by Ardath Burkhart and dubbed "Ardath's Army", had raised more than $250,000, which was enough to assure that WFYI would sign on the air and resulted in a congratulatory telegram from first lady Pat Nixon.

The launch was originally set for September 1970, but equipment issues resulted in a month's delay. The transmitter was activated on September 16, and WFYI began programming on the evening of October 4, becoming the first new television station in Indianapolis since 1957. The next day, PBS began operations in replacement of National Educational Television. Offices were maintained at Oldfields until WFYI moved into the former WISH-TV studios at 1440 Meridian Street in August 1971, enabling it to start producing its first local programming on January 2, 1972.

=== Growth in the 1970s and 1980s ===
When Frank Meek became WFYI's general manager in 1972, the station was struggling to make payroll, and the only cameras it owned filmed in black-and-white. In 1973, after WISH ultimately opted not to build its proposed tower, WFYI began construction of its own mast. The relocation came with a decrease in effective radiated power but raised the height above average terrain by 600 feet (180 m), improving reception. The Women's Council for Channel 20 became Friends of Channel 20, the station's fundraising support arm, in 1975; Ardath Burkhart served on the WFYI board and the PBS national board of directors before dying in 1983 at the age of 78.

WFYI left the former WISH-TV studios but remained on Meridian Street when it moved into studios being vacated by WTHR at 1401 Meridian in 1982; new UHF startup WPDS-TV (channel 59) then occupied the 1440 Meridian facility. In 1986, Metropolitan Indianapolis Public Broadcasting acquired WIAN (90.1 FM), a public radio station owned by Indianapolis Public Schools. The station became known as WFYI-FM in March 1988.

From 1985 to 1989, WFYI programming was seen in Fort Wayne, Indiana, until public television station WFWA there began originating its own programming.

=== 1990s to today ===
Logo used from 1990 to 2008.

Meek retired at the end of 1988; he was replaced by Lloyd Wright, who began a 30-year tenure as general manager (a title changed to president and CEO). Under Wright, WFYI began its first-ever capital fundraising effort in 1995, as part of its 25th anniversary; this was undertaken to replace outdated equipment, which included the oldest UHF transmitter in use in the state of Indiana. In 1999, WFYI and Butler, which had built WTBU (channel 69) in 1991, entered into a joint operating agreement whereby the two stations would collaborate on programming and facilities. This continued until Butler sold WTBU in 2004 to the Daystar Television Network.

What was then known as the "WFYI Teleplex" announced in 2007 that it would move to 1630 North Meridian Street, a building previously used by Indiana Energy. The $20 million relocation included the $8.5 million purchase of the building and $11.6 million in new equipment. The larger facility offered more room for community events, more parking, and space that WFYI could sublease to other companies. WFYI television was the last component of the public media company to move into the building in 2008. During this time, in 2007, the station began offering subchannels on its digital signal.

The state of Indiana eliminated funding for WFYI in 2009 due to a major revenue shortfall from the Great Recession. As a result, production ceased on new episodes of Across Indiana, a popular state travel series on the air since 1988.

In March 2024, WFYI content staff announced their intentions to unionize with SAG-AFTRA and asked management for voluntary recognition.

== Funding ==
In fiscal year 2021, WFYI TV had total revenue of $8.67 million. Its 17,789 contributors donated more than $1.9 million. The Corporation for Public Broadcasting contributed $1.3 million, most of it in the form of a Community Service Grant.

== Programming ==
Historically, WFYI has rarely been a large producer of network programming. This was because there were fewer underwriters for expensive productions, as fewer major companies were headquartered in Indianapolis. However, it has produced a significant amount of local and regional programming. In 1974, the station began airing state public affairs program The Lawmakers, later retitled Indiana Lawmakers, which covers the activities of the Indiana General Assembly.

== Technical information ==
=== Subchannels ===
The WFYI TV transmitter is located on West 79th Street and Township Line Road on the northwest side of Indianapolis (near Meridian Hills). The station's signal is multiplexed:

Subchannels of WFYI
Subchannel	Res.	Short name	Programming
20.1	1080i	WFYI 1	PBS
20.2	1080i	WFYI 2	PBS Kids
20.3	480i	WFYI 3	Create

All three subchannels are also broadcast on WFYI-LD (channel 29), an ATSC 3.0 (NextGen TV) transmitter that began service in 2022.

=== Analog-to-digital conversion ===
WFYI shut down its analog signal, over UHF channel 20, on June 12, 2009, the official date on which full-power television stations in the United States transitioned from analog to digital broadcasts under federal mandate; the station's digital signal continued to broadcast on its pre-transition UHF channel 21, using virtual channel 20.
