= WFYI-FM =

Public radio station in Indianapolis, IN, USA

Coordinates: 39.900°N 86.200°W

- Indianapolis, Indiana; United States
- Broadcast area: Indianapolis metropolitan area
- Frequency: 90.1 MHz (HD Radio)

Programming
- Format: Public radio; News/talk
- Subchannels: HD2: Adult album alternative and world music "The Point"
- Affiliations: National Public Radio; Public Radio Exchange

Ownership
- Owner: Metropolitan Indianapolis Public Broadcasting

History
- First air date: October 14, 1954; 71 years ago
- Former call signs: WIAN (1954–1988)
- Call sign meaning: "For Your Information" and "For You Indiana"

Technical information
- Licensing authority: FCC
- Facility ID: 41394
- Class: B
- ERP: 10,000 watts
- HAAT: 171 metres (561 ft)

Links
- Public license information: Public file; LMS
- Webcast: Listen Live
- Website: WFYI.org/radio

WFYI-FM (90.1 MHz) is a public radio station in Indianapolis, Indiana. It is operated by Metropolitan Indianapolis Public Media, a public broadcasting community licensee which also operates the area's Public Broadcasting Service (PBS) member station, WFYI Public Television via on-air digital channels 20.1, 20.2 and 20.3. WFYI-FM is a member of National Public Radio (NPR) and carries news and information programming.

The studios and offices for WFYI-TV-FM are off North Meridian Street in Indianapolis. The transmitter is on Township Line Road, also in Indianapolis. WFYI-FM has an effective radiated power (ERP) of 10,000 watts. It broadcasts in the HD Radio hybrid format. Its HD2 subchannel is known as "The Point", playing Adult Album Alternative and World Music. Most of WFYI-FM's programming is also simulcast on WNDY in Crawfordsville and WISU in Terre Haute.

== History ==
The station signed on for the first time on October 14, 1954, as WIAN, operated by the Indianapolis Public Schools, with the license held by the Board of School Commissioners. At first, it was powered at only 120 watts. The station offered classroom instruction and some student programming. In the 1960s, the station increased its power to the current 10,000 watts.

After years of operating at low power and limited hours, it expanded its hours and programming through a partnership with The Fine Arts Society of Indianapolis in which the Society broadcast classical music, apart from some hours devoted to educational programming. This gave WIAN enough hours to become a charter member of NPR in 1971.

IPS sold the station to Metropolitan Indianapolis Public Broadcasting in 1988, and on March 15, 1988, it changed its call sign to WFYI-FM. Over time, the amount of classical music was decreased as the station added more news and informational programming.

WFYI is the home base of the health news service Side Effects Public Media.

== IRIS ==
WFYI 90.1 FM Public Radio carries services for the print-impaired via the Internet and a subcarrier (SCA) broadcast signal. It is known as the Indiana Reading and Information Services (IRIS). It was previously named Central Indiana Radio Reading, Inc. (CIRRI).
