= National Register of Historic Places listings in Metcalfe County, Kentucky =

Location of Metcalfe County in Kentucky

This is a list of the National Register of Historic Places listings in Metcalfe County, Kentucky.

It is intended to be a complete list of the properties on the National Register of Historic Places in Metcalfe County, Kentucky, United States. The locations of National Register properties for which the latitude and longitude coordinates are included below, may be seen on a map.

There are 5 properties listed on the National Register in the county.

This National Park Service list is complete through NPS recent listings posted March 21, 2025.

== Current listings ==
	Name on the Register	Image	Date listed	Location	City or town	Description
1	The Bell House	The Bell House	February 12, 2016 (#16000012)	7310 Columbia Rd. 36°59′53″N 85°30′57″W	Edmonton	Free Classic frame house in rural area
2	Metcalfe County Jail	Metcalfe County Jail	August 4, 2004 (#04000791)	Corner of East; 36°58′50″N 85°36′40″W	Edmonton	
3	Metcalfe County Kentucky Courthouse	Metcalfe County Kentucky Courthouse	March 24, 2000 (#00000271)	Public Square; 36°58′45″N 85°36′41″W	Edmonton	
4	Stockton-Ray House	Stockton-Ray House	April 13, 1992 (#92000289)	Off the junction of U.S. Route 68/Kentucky Route 80 and Cumberland Parkway; 36°59′40″N 85°39′15″W	Edmonton	
5	Sulphur Well Historic District	Sulphur Well Historic District	August 14, 1998 (#98000932)	Roughly bounded by Wister Wallace Rd., the southern fork of the Little Barren River, Mitchell-Edwards Rd., and Kentucky Route 70; 37°06′03″N 85°38′04″W	Sulphur Well	

== See also ==
- List of National Historic Landmarks in Kentucky
- National Register of Historic Places listings in Kentucky
