= Barren County Progress =

Weekly newspaper serving Barren County, Kentucky

- Type: Weekly newspaper
- Format: Broadsheet
- Owner(s): Jobe Publishing, Inc.
- Publisher: Jeff Jobe
- Founded: 1882
- Headquarters: Glasgow, Kentucky
- Price: 50 cents (Newsstand, within Barren County) $31.95 One-year subscription(in Barren and surrounding counties)
- Website: jpinews.com/the-barren-county-progress

The Barren County Progress is a weekly newspaper serving Barren County, Kentucky, including the cities of Cave City, Park City, and Glasgow. Headquartered in Glasgow, the newspaper is owned by Jobe Publishing, Inc. The Progress is printed in the company's plant in Horse Cave, Kentucky.

This newspaper is part of Jobe Publishing's news and advertising network that serves Barren, Butler, Edmonson, Hart, Metcalfe, and Monroe Counties in Kentucky, meaning that Jobe also publishes the Butler County Banner-Republican, Edmonson News, The Herald-News of Metcalfe County, Monroe County Citizen, and the Hart County News-Herald, respectively. All of Jobe's newspapers, including the Progress, are members of the Kentucky Press Association.

== History ==
The newspaper was founded in the 1960s by Aubrey C. and Dorothy Wilson as The Cave City Progress. The newspaper expanded its coverage area in the late 1970s, opening a news bureau in Glasgow and changing the name to The Barren County Progress. Editorial management of the newspaper passed on to A.C. Wilson Jr. at about that same time. The parent company became known as Cave Country Newspapers, which subsequently acquired The Hart County News and The Hart County Herald in Hart County, Kentucky. (These newspapers were later consolidated as The Hart County News-Herald.) Under the younger Wilson's leadership, the company also established The Monroe County Citizen in Tompkinsville and The Metcalfe County Light in Edmonton, as well as the failed twice-weekly Morning Messenger in Bowling Green. Wilson Jr. also briefly put the Progress on a twice-weekly publication schedule in the 1980s, and also dropped the words "Barren County" from the nameplate for several years in the 1980s and 1990s.

In 2004, the Progress and its sister newspapers were sold by Wilson Jr.—by then the sole remaining member of the Wilson family still involved in the business—to Jobe Publishing, Inc., based in Morgantown and publishers of the Butler County Banner and Green River Republican. Jobe Publishing subsequently moved their operating headquarters to the Cave Country publishing plant in Horse Cave.

The primary competitor of the Progress was the Glasgow Daily Times, a daily newspaper based in Glasgow. The Times closed on June 9, 2020, leaving The Progress as the only remaining newspaper in Barren County.
