= Hart County News-Herald =

Weekly newspaper in Munfordville, Kentucky, United States

- Type: Weekly newspaper
- Owner(s): Jobe Publishing, Inc.
- Publisher: Jeffery S. Jobe
- Editor: Gerald Maters
- Founded: 1886
- Headquarters: Horse Cave, Kentucky
- Price: 50 cents

The Hart County News-Herald is a weekly newspaper serving Hart County in South-Central Kentucky, including Munfordville, Bonnieville and Horse Cave. Headquartered in Horse Cave, it is owned by Jobe Publishing, Inc.

The News-Herald is part of Jobe Publishing's news and advertising network that also publishes weekly newspapers in Barren, Butler, Edmonson, Metcalfe, and Monroe Counties, all of which, along with the News-Herald, are members of the Kentucky Press Association.
