= Edmonton Herald-News =

Weekly newspaper in Edmonton, Kentucky, United States

- Type: Weekly newspaper
- Format: Broadsheet
- Owner: Jobe Publishing, Inc.
- Founded: 1882
- Headquarters: Edmonton, Kentucky

The Edmonton Herald-News is a weekly newspaper based in Edmonton, Kentucky. Serving Metcalfe County in south-central Kentucky, the newspaper serves Edmonton, Wisdom, Summer Shade, and Sulphur Well with local news and community information every Wednesday.

The Herald-News is a part of Jobe Publishing's news and advertising network that, in addition to Metcalfe County, also serves neighboring Allen, Barren, Cumberland, along with Butler, Edmonson, Hart Counties and Russell by virtue of Jobe's ownership of weekly newspapers in the aforementioned counties. All Jobe Publishing-owned newspapers are members of the Kentucky Press Association.

== History ==
The newspaper began operations, and released its first print edition in 1882. After the 2005 purchase of the newspaper by Jobe Publishing, the Herald-News became available in an electronic edition.
