= Summer Shade, Kentucky =

Unincorporated community in Kentucky, United States

- Census-designated place
- Location within Kentucky Location within the United States
- Coordinates: 36°53′3″N 85°42′9″W
- Country: United States
- State: Kentucky
- County: Metcalfe

Area
  - Total: 2.04 sq mi (5.28 km^{2})
  - Land: 2.03 sq mi (5.27 km^{2})
  - Water: 0.0039 sq mi (0.01 km^{2})
- Elevation: 896 ft (273 m)

Population (2020)
  - Total: 294
  - Density: 144.6/sq mi (55.82/km^{2})
- Time zone: UTC-6 (Central (CST))
  - Summer (DST): UTC-5 (CST)
- ZIP code: 42166
- FIPS code: 21-74586
- GNIS feature ID: 504782

Summer Shade is an unincorporated community and census-designated place (CDP) in Metcalfe County, Kentucky, United States. As of the 2020 census, the population was 294.

== History ==
Originally the area was known as "Sartain Precinct" and later as "Glover's Creek"; W.M. Riggs, the postmaster, changed the name to Summer Shade in 1872.

== Geography ==
Summer Shade is located in southwestern Metcalfe County. Kentucky Route 90 (KY 90), connecting Glasgow to Burkesville and the Dale Hollow Lake area, runs through Summer Shade. Glasgow is 14 miles (23 km) to the northwest, while Burkesville is 23 miles (37 km) to the southeast. KY 640 leads north from Summer Shade 11 miles (18 km) to Wisdom and 17 miles (27 km) to Knob Lick. KY 163 passes just east of the community, leading north 8 miles (13 km) to Edmonton, the Metcalfe county seat, and south 12 miles (19 km) to Tompkinsville.

According to the U.S. Census Bureau, the Summer Shade CDP has an area of 2.04 square miles (5.3 km^{2}), of which 0.005 square miles (0.013 km^{2}), or 0.25%, are water. The community sits on a ridge that drains to the west and north to Glover Creek and south to Nobob Creek. Both creeks flow west toward Skaggs Creek, a tributary of the Barren River and part of the Green River watershed.

The rural-dominated area is home to the Kingsford Charcoal factory. Located 2 miles (3 km) east of Summer Shade on KY 90 near Beaumont, it identifies itself as a Summer Shade-based business.

=== Climate ===
The climate in this area is characterized by hot, humid summers and generally mild to cool winters. According to the Köppen Climate Classification system, Summer Shade has a humid subtropical climate, abbreviated "Cfa" on climate maps.

Climate data for Summer Shade, Kentucky (1991–2020)
Month	Jan	Feb	Mar	Apr	May	Jun	Jul	Aug	Sep	Oct	Nov	Dec	Year
Mean daily maximum °F (°C)	47.6 (8.7)	53.3 (11.8)	61.1 (16.2)	72.1 (22.3)	79.6 (26.4)	86.3 (30.2)	89.7 (32.1)	88.7 (31.5)	82.4 (28.0)	72.5 (22.5)	61.2 (16.2)	51.1 (10.6)	70.5 (21.4)
Daily mean °F (°C)	35.8 (2.1)	40.0 (4.4)	47.4 (8.6)	57.5 (14.2)	65.5 (18.6)	72.8 (22.7)	76.2 (24.6)	75.0 (23.9)	68.7 (20.4)	58.1 (14.5)	47.1 (8.4)	39.0 (3.9)	56.9 (13.9)
Mean daily minimum °F (°C)	24.0 (−4.4)	26.8 (−2.9)	33.8 (1.0)	42.9 (6.1)	51.5 (10.8)	59.3 (15.2)	62.7 (17.1)	61.2 (16.2)	54.9 (12.7)	43.7 (6.5)	33.0 (0.6)	26.9 (−2.8)	43.4 (6.3)
Average precipitation inches (mm)	3.87 (98)	4.15 (105)	4.79 (122)	4.28 (109)	4.60 (117)	4.44 (113)	3.92 (100)	4.07 (103)	3.73 (95)	3.56 (90)	3.62 (92)	4.57 (116)	49.6 (1,260)
Average snowfall inches (cm)	3.2 (8.1)	1.8 (4.6)	0.8 (2.0)	0.0 (0.0)	0.0 (0.0)	0.0 (0.0)	0.0 (0.0)	0.0 (0.0)	0.0 (0.0)	0.0 (0.0)	0.0 (0.0)	1.4 (3.6)	7.2 (18.3)
Source: NOAA

== Demographics ==
Historical population
Census	Pop.	Note	%±
2020	294		—
U.S. Decennial Census

== Education ==
There was one school in Summer Shade that was known as Summer Shade Elementary School. It went from grades K-6. Currently, students go to Metcalfe County Elementary in Edmonton.

== Notable people ==
- Charles "Pat" Dougherty (1879–1939), baseball pitcher in the pre-Negro leagues
