= Ray House =

Ray House may refer to:

in the United States (by state then city)

- Sam Ray House, Clay, Arkansas, listed on the National Register of Historic Places (NRHP) in White County
- Ray Apartments Buildings, Denver, Colorado, listed on the NRHP in Downtown Denver
- Frank G. Ray House & Carriage House, Vinton, Iowa, listed on the NRHP in Benton County
- Stockton-Ray House, Edmonton, Kentucky, listed on the NRHP in Metcalfe County
- Ray House (Lancaster, Kentucky), listed on the NRHP in Garrard County
- Ray-Wakefield House, Maud, Kentucky, listed on the NRHP in Washington County
- Ray Homestead, Opelousas, Louisiana, listed on the NRHP in St. Landry Parish
- Bullard-Ray House, Eden, North Carolina, listed on the NRHP in Rockingham County
- Clyde H. Ray Sr. House, Waynesville, North Carolina, listed on the NRHP in Haywood County
- Ray Opera House, Ray, North Dakota, listed on the NRHP in Williams County
- Harold Wass Ray House, Hillsboro, Oregon, listed on the NRHP in Washington County
- Childress-Ray House, Murfreesboro, Tennessee, listed on the NRHP in Rutherford County
- M. B. Ray House, Waxahachie, Texas, listed on the NRHP in Ellis County
- William H. Ray House, Provo, Utah, listed on the NRHP in Utah County
- Steedman-Ray House, Washington, D.C., listed on the NRHP in Northwest Quadrant
