= Metcalfe County Jail =

- U.S. National Register of Historic Places
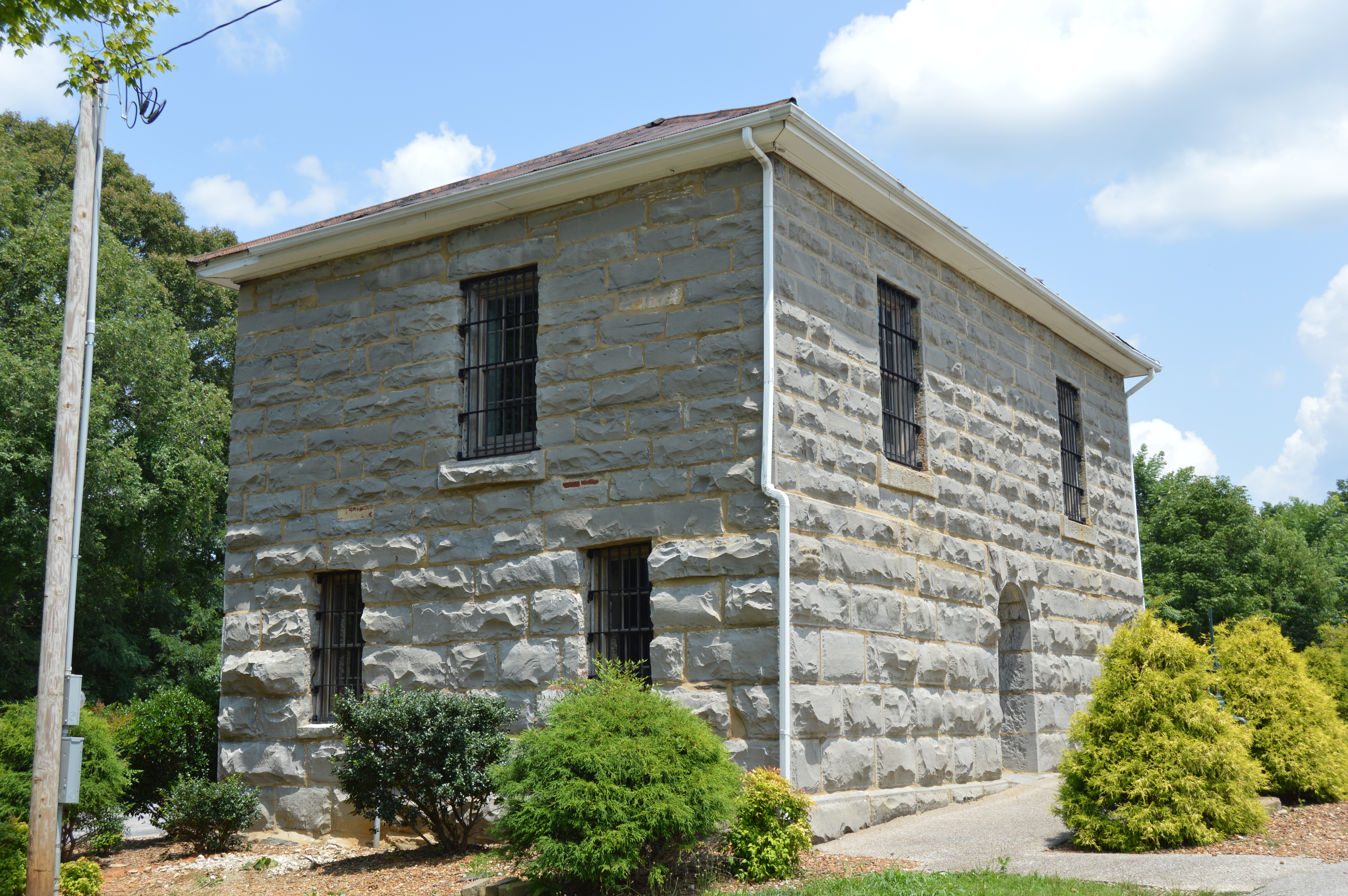

- Location within Kentucky Location within the United States
- Location: East Street, Edmonton, Kentucky
- Coordinates: 36°58′50″N 85°36′40″W
- Area: 2.3 acres (0.93 ha)
- Built: c.1861
- Built by: John Wilson
- Architectural style: Mid 19th Century Revival, Romanesque
- NRHP reference No.: 04000791
- Added to NRHP: August 4, 2004

The Metcalfe County Jail, in Edmonton, Kentucky, is a historic jail which was built around 1861. It was used to hold prisoners until the early 1980s. It was listed on the National Register of Historic Places in 2004.

It is an early Romanesque Revival-style building constructed of limestone blocks by stonemason John Wilson. It is 36.75 by 24.33 feet (11.20 m × 7.42 m) in plan.

It is located on a corner of East street about 600 feet (180 m) northeast of the Metcalfe County Courthouse.
