= Echo, Kentucky =

Unincorporated community in Kentucky, United States

- Unincorporated community
- Location within Kentucky Location within the United States
- Coordinates: 37°1′40″N 85°44′51″W
- Country: United States
- State: Kentucky
- County: Metcalfe
- Elevation: 889 ft (271 m)
- Time zone: UTC-5 (Eastern (EST))
  - Summer (DST): UTC-4 (EDT)
- GNIS feature ID: 507904

Echo is an unincorporated community located in Metcalfe County, Kentucky, United States. Echo was originally established as Seventy Seven in 1891, then changed to Echo in 1894. A post office with service to Knob Lick, Metcalfe County, Kentucky opened in 1914.
