= Beegie Adair =

American jazz pianist and bandleader (1937–2022)

- Born: Bobbe Gorin Long; December 11, 1937; Cave City, Kentucky, U.S.
- Died: January 23, 2022 (aged 84) Franklin, Tennessee, U.S.
- Genres: Jazz
- Occupation: Musician
- Instrument: Piano
- Labels: Adair Music Group, Green Hill, Village Square Music
- Website: www.beegieadair.com

Bobbe Gorin "Beegie" Adair (née Long, December 11, 1937 – January 23, 2022) was an American jazz pianist and bandleader, whose career spanned more than 60 years.

== Early life ==
Bobbe Gorin Long was born in Cave City, Kentucky, on December 11, 1937. Her parents, Bobbe (Martin) Long and Arthur Long, owned a gas station. Adair began playing the piano at the age of five. She graduated from Caverna High School in 1954. Adair earned a Bachelor of Science degree in music education at Western Kentucky University in 1958.

Adair worked as a children's music teacher for three years before relocating to Nashville, Tennessee, in 1961.

== Career ==
In 1961, Adair moved to Nashville, where she played in Printer's Alley and became a member of a jazz band led by Hank Garland. Over the course of her career, Adair accompanied a wide range of performers, including Dinah Shore, Peggy Lee, Ray Stevens, Steve Allen, Chet Atkins, Cass Elliot, Vince Gill and Dolly Parton. She played at various times for the Noon Show on WSM-TV and on The Johnny Cash Show and other programs.

She partnered with Denis Solee in 1982 to establish the Adair–Solee Quartet, which became the sextet Be-Bop Co-Op. Adair released her first solo album in her name with Escape to New York (1998). She formed the Beegie Adair Trio, which has sold more than 1.5 million albums.

Adair appeared on more than 100 recordings throughout her 60-year career. Of these, 35 were recorded by her eponymous trio which included Adair, bassist Roger Spencer and percussionist Chris Brown. Among Adair's influences were George Shearing, Bill Evans, Oscar Peterson, and Erroll Garner. In 2002, Adair released a six-CD centennial collection, The Great American Songbook Collection, with tunes by American composers such as Richard Rodgers, George Gershwin, Jerome Kern, Duke Ellington, Hoagy Carmichael and Irving Berlin.

Adair was an adjunct professor of jazz studies at Vanderbilt University's Blair School of Music. She was a faculty and board member of the Nashville Jazz Workshop, where she often performed.

In 2002, Adair was named a Steinway Artist. She was inducted into Western Kentucky University's Hall of Fame and Cave City's Hall of Fame. She was the inaugural recipient of Nashville Jazz Workshop's Heritage Award.

== Personal life ==
Adair lived in Franklin, Tennessee. She was married to Billy Adair for 38 years until his death in February 2014. He was an associate professor of jazz studies at the Blair School of Music.

Adair died at her home in Franklin on January 23, 2022, at the age of 84.

== Discography ==
- 1997 Frank Sinatra Collection: A Musical Tribute (Green Hill)
- 1998 Nat King Cole Collection: A Jazz Piano Tribute (Spring Hill)
- 1998 Escape to New York (Cap Records)
- 1999 Jazz Piano Christmas (Green Hill)
- 2000 Love, Elvis (Beegie Adair Trio) (Spring Hill)
- 2001 Dream Dancing: Songs of Cole Porter (Spring Hill)
- 2002 I'll Take Romance (Spring Hill)
- 2002 Centennial Composers Collection (Green Hill)
- 2003 Days of Wine and Roses (Village Square)
- 2004 Embraceable You (Green Hill)
- 2004 Quiet Christmas (Village Square)
- 2004 Sentimental Journey (Village Square)
- 2004 The Way You Look Tonight: The Romantic Songs of Jerome Kern (Green Hill)
- 2005 An Affair to Remember: Romantic Movie Songs of the 1950s (Green Hill)
- 2005 The Nearness of You (Spring Hill)
- 2005 Sinatra on Sax (Beegie Adair Trio and Denis Solee) (CD Baby re-release 2012)
- 2006 Cheek to Cheek (Spring Hill)
- 2006 Quiet Romance: Solo Piano (Village Square Music)
- 2008 Dream Dancing (Spring Hill)
- 2008 Dancing in the Dark: A Tribute to Fred Astaire (Green Hill)
- 2008 Dinner Music: Light Jazz (Green Hill)
- 2008 In a Sentimental Mood (Green Hill)
- 2008 My Romance: Romantic Songs of Richard Rodgers (Green Hill)
- 2008 Yesterday: A Solo Piano Tribute to the Music of the Beatles (Green Hill)
- 2009 Moments to Remember: Timeless Pop Hits of the 1950s (Green Hill)
- 2009 Parisian Café (with David Davidson) (Green Hill)
- 2009 Winter Romance (Green Hill)
- 2009 Jazz Piano Christmas (Chordant Music Group)
- 2010 Swingin' with Sinatra (Green Hill)
- 2010 Christmas Jazz: Instrumental Jazz for the Holidays (Green Hill)
- 2011 Cocktail Party (Green Hill)
- 2011 I Love Being Here with You: A Jazz Piano Tribute to Peggy Lee (Green Hill)
- 2011 Into Somethin' (Green Hill)
- 2011 Love Letters: The Beegie Adair Romance Collection (Green Hill)
- 2011 Piano Music for Quiet Moments (Spring Hill)
- 2012 After the Ball (with Jaimee Paul) (Green Hill)
- 2012 Christmas and Cocktails (Green Hill)
- 2012 Christmas Elegance: Elegant Holiday Instrumentals Featuring Piano and Violin (Green Hill)
- 2012 Cocktail Party Piano: Elegant (Green Hill)
- 2012 Jazz and the Movies (Green Hill)
- 2012 Jazz for the Road (Green Hill)
- 2012 Trav'lin' Light: Instrumental Jazz for the Open Road (Denis Solee and the Beegie Adair Trio) (Burton Avenue Music)
- 2012 Days of Wine and Roses: Songs of Johnny Mercer (Green Hill)
- 2012 Piano Music for Moms: Mother's Day Music Collection (Green Hill)
- 2012 Piano Music for Weddings (Green Hill)
- 2012 Save the Last Dance for Me: A Jazz Trio Salute to Timeless Pop Hits of the 1960s (Green Hill)
- 2012 The Real Thing: Live (Green Hill/Adair Music Group)
- 2013 As Time Goes By: Silver Screen Classics From The Golden Age Of Cinema (Green Hill)
- 2013 A Time for Love: Jazz Piano Romance (Green Hill)
- 2013 Jazz on Broadway (Beegie Adair Trio with Jack Jezzro) (Green Hill)
- 2013: Sentimental Journey: Saluting the Greatest Generation With Classic Gems of the World War II Era (Green Hill)
- 2014 The Good Life: A Jazz Piano Tribute to Tony Bennett (Green Hill)
- 2014 Vintage Jazz (Green Hill)
- 2014 By Myself (Green Hill)
- 2015 Too Marvelous for Words (with Don Aliquo) (Adair Music Group)
- 2015 Quiet Christmas: Solo Piano (Green Hill)
- 2016 Some Enchanted Evening (with Monica Ramey) (Green Hill)
- 2016 Jazz Romance (Green Hill)
- 2017 By Request (Green Hill)
- 2018 Gershwin on Sax (Beegie Adair Trio and Denis Solee) (Green Hill)
- 2019 Grover's Hat Project (CD Baby)
- 2020 Beegie Adair Collection
- 2020 Best of Beegie Adair: Solo Piano Performances
- 2020 Best of Beegie Adair: Jazz Piano Christmas Performances
- 2021 Valentine's Day Jazz
- 2021 Best of Beegie Adair: Jazz Piano Performances
- 2021 Beegie Adair: The Collection [2021]
- 2021 Winter Wonderland
- 2021 Christmas Fireplace
- 2022 Deep Cuts
