= Bell House (Edmonton, Kentucky) =

Historic house in Kentucky, United States

- Page-Bell House
- U.S. National Register of Historic Places
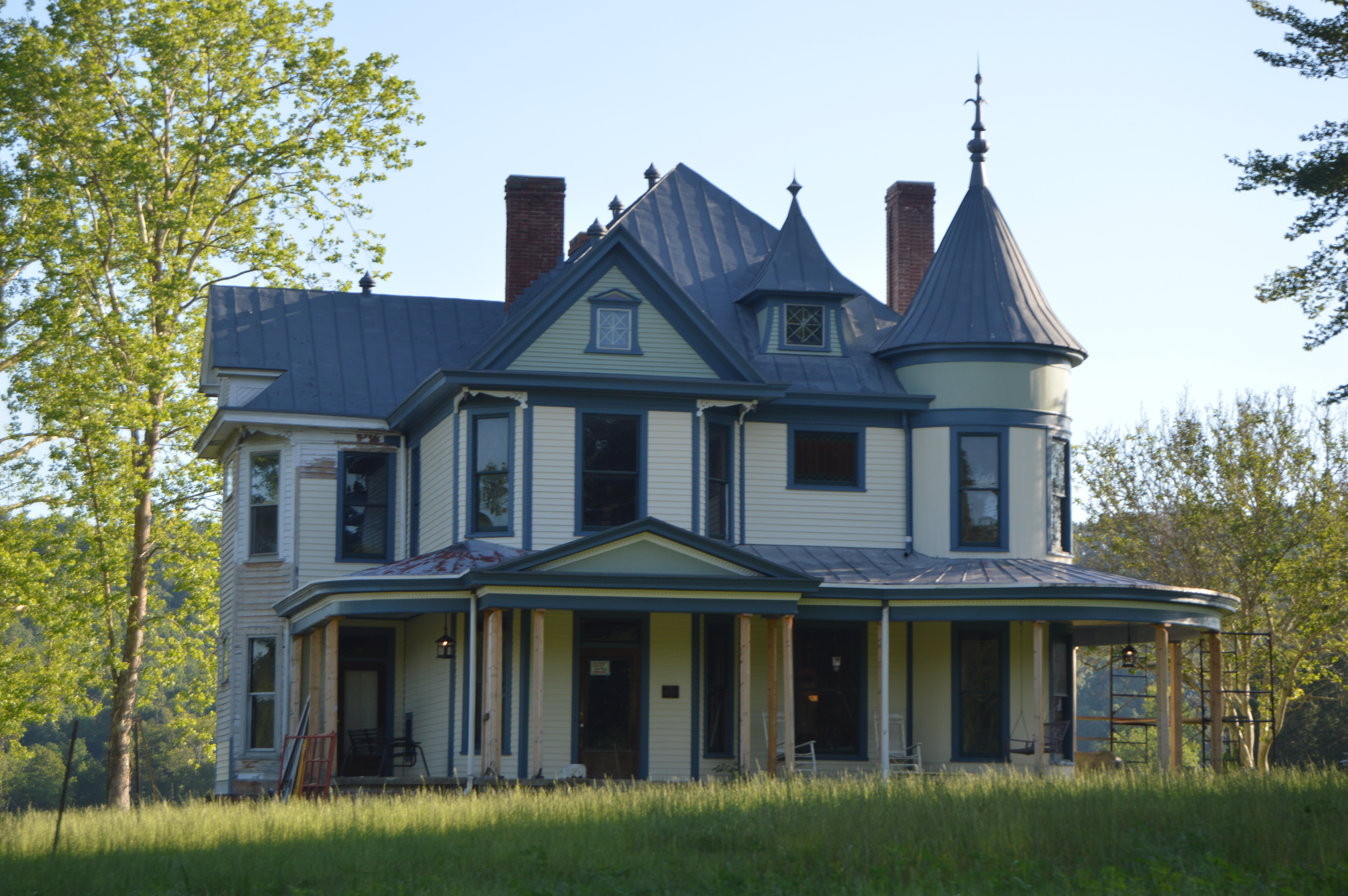

- Location within Kentucky Location within the United States
- Location: 7310 Columbia Rd., about 7 miles (11 km) northeast of Edmonton, Kentucky
- Coordinates: 36°59′53″N 85°30′57″W
- Area: 1.89 acres (0.76 ha)
- Built: 1907-1909
- Architect: Charles Killian, Owensboro, Kentucky
- Architectural style: Free Classic style of Queen Anne architecture
- NRHP reference No.: 16000012
- Added to NRHP: February 12, 2016

The Bell House, at 7310 Columbia Rd. in rural Metcalfe County, Kentucky, near Edmonton, was listed on the National Register of Historic Places in 2016.

It is a two-and-a-half-story Free Classic-style frame house.

The listing included five contributing resources: the house, a two-story frame wash house, a chicken house, a storage shed, and a garage. A later-built pump house was deemed non-contributing.
