= Glasgow micropolitan area, Kentucky =

Glasgow, KY Micropolitan Statistical Area
- Micropolitan Statistical Area
- Glasgow, KY Micropolitan Statistical Area
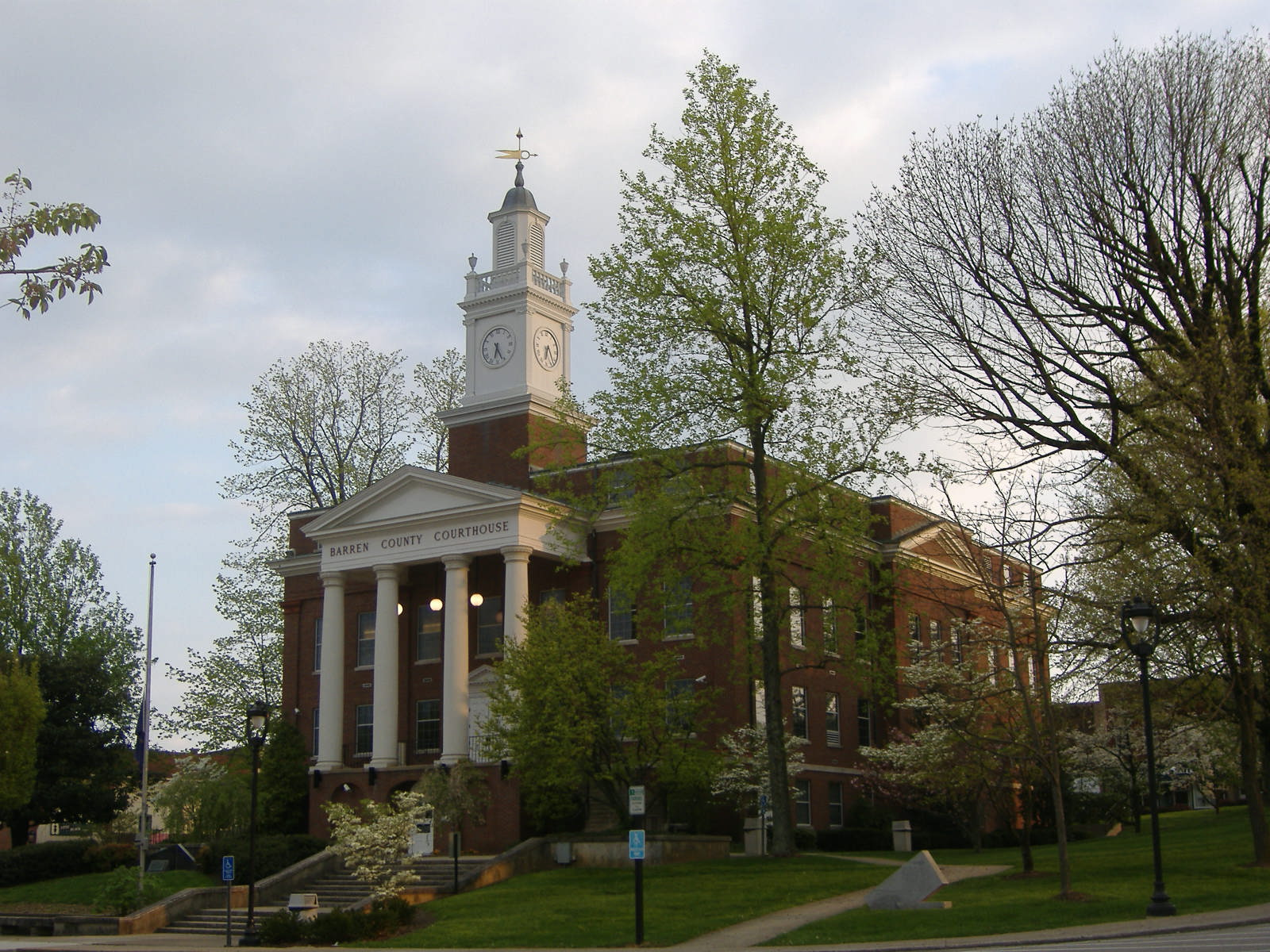
- Barren County Courthouse
Bowling Green–Glasgow–Franklin, KY CSA
City of Bowling Green
Bowling Green, KY MSA
City of Glasgow
Glasgow, KY µSA
Franklin, KY µSA
- Country: United States
- State: Kentucky
- Largest city: Glasgow
- Time zones: UTC–5 (EST)
  - Summer (DST): UTC–4 (EDT)
- UTC–6 (CST)
  - Summer (DST): UTC–5 (CDT)

The Glasgow Micropolitan Statistical Area, as defined by the United States Census Bureau, is an area consisting of two counties in Kentucky, anchored by the city of Glasgow. As of the 2000 census, the μSA had a population of 48,070 (though a July 1, 2009 estimate placed the population at 51,810).

== Counties ==
- Barren
- Metcalfe

== Communities ==
=== Incorporated places ===
- Cave City
- Edmonton
- Glasgow (Principal city)
- Park City

=== Unincorporated places ===
- Center
- Eighty Eight
- Hiseville
- Randolph
- Summer Shade
- Wisdom

== Demographics ==
As of the census of 2000, there were 48,070 people, 19,362 households, and 13,824 families residing within the μSA. The racial makeup of the μSA was 94.92% White, 3.58% African American, 0.17% Native American, 0.34% Asian, 0.02% Pacific Islander, 0.33% from other races, and 0.65% from two or more races. Hispanic or Latino of any race were 0.85% of the population.

The median income for a household in the μSA was $27,390, and the median income for a family was $33,205. Males had a median income of $26,145 versus $19,900 for females. The per capita income for the μSA was $15,026.

== See also ==
- Kentucky census statistical areas
