= Caverna Independent School District =

School district in Kentucky, United States

Caverna Independent Schools

Address
- 1102 North Dixie Highway Cave City, Kentucky, 42127; United States

District information
- Grades: K - 12

Students and staff
- District mascot: Colonels

Other information
- Telephone: (270) 773-2530
- Fax: (270) 773-2524
- Website: caverna.kyschools.us

The Caverna Independent School District is a Kentucky public school district that ranges from Horse Cave to Cave City, in the United States. It is one of the few public school districts in the state of Kentucky that includes portions of more than one county. The school district includes portions of northwestern Barren and southwestern Hart County, including most of Cave City (excluding the area immediately surrounding the Interstate 65–Kentucky 70 interchange) and all of Horse Cave. The district boundary extends well past the limits of both cities.

== Schools ==
- Caverna Elementary School (Pre-school through 5th grade)
- Caverna Middle School (Grades 6–8)
- Caverna High School (Grades 9–12)
