= Alone, Kentucky =

Alone, KY
- Unincorporated community
- Location within the state of Kentucky Alone, KY (the United States)
- Coordinates: 37°1′33.9″N 85°39′10.4″W
- Country: United States
- State: Kentucky
- County: Metcalfe
- Founded: 1880
- Founder: J.C. Withers
- Elevation: 804 ft (245 m)

Population (1897)
  - Total: 50
- Time zone: UTC-5 (Eastern (EST))
  - Summer (DST): UTC-4 (EDT)

Alone is a ghost town and unincorporated townsite in Metcalfe County, Kentucky, along KY 1243, named by J.C. Withers.

== History ==
A post office was established on November 30, 1880, and D.J. Anderson was postmaster in 1887. In 1892, the Beachville Lodge No. 619 of the Masons met here every Saturday of each month.

From July 1, 1914, to July 1, 1917, Alone readers were supplied by a traveling library.
