= Monroe County Citizen =

Weekly newspaper in Tompkinsville, Kentucky, United States

- Type: Weekly newspaper
- Format: Broadsheet
- Owner: Jobe Publishing
- Editor: Anne Craig
- Founded: 1990
- Headquarters: Tompkinsville, Kentucky
- Website: https://www.jpinews.com/the-monroe-county-citizen/

The Monroe County Citizen, known simply as The Citizen, is a weekly newspaper in south-central Kentucky. Headquartered in Tompkinsville, the newspaper serves Monroe County, including Tompkinsville, Gamaliel, and Fountain Run.

The Herald-News is a part of the Horse Cave-based Jobe Publishing's news and advertising network that, in addition to Metcalfe County, also serves neighboring Barren and Metcalfe Counties, along with Butler, Edmonson and Hart Counties by virtue of Jobe's ownership of weekly newspapers in the aforementioned counties. All Jobe Publishing-owned newspapers are members of the Kentucky Press Association.
