= Sulphur Well Historic District =

Historic district in Kentucky, United States

- U.S. National Register of Historic Places
- U.S. Historic district
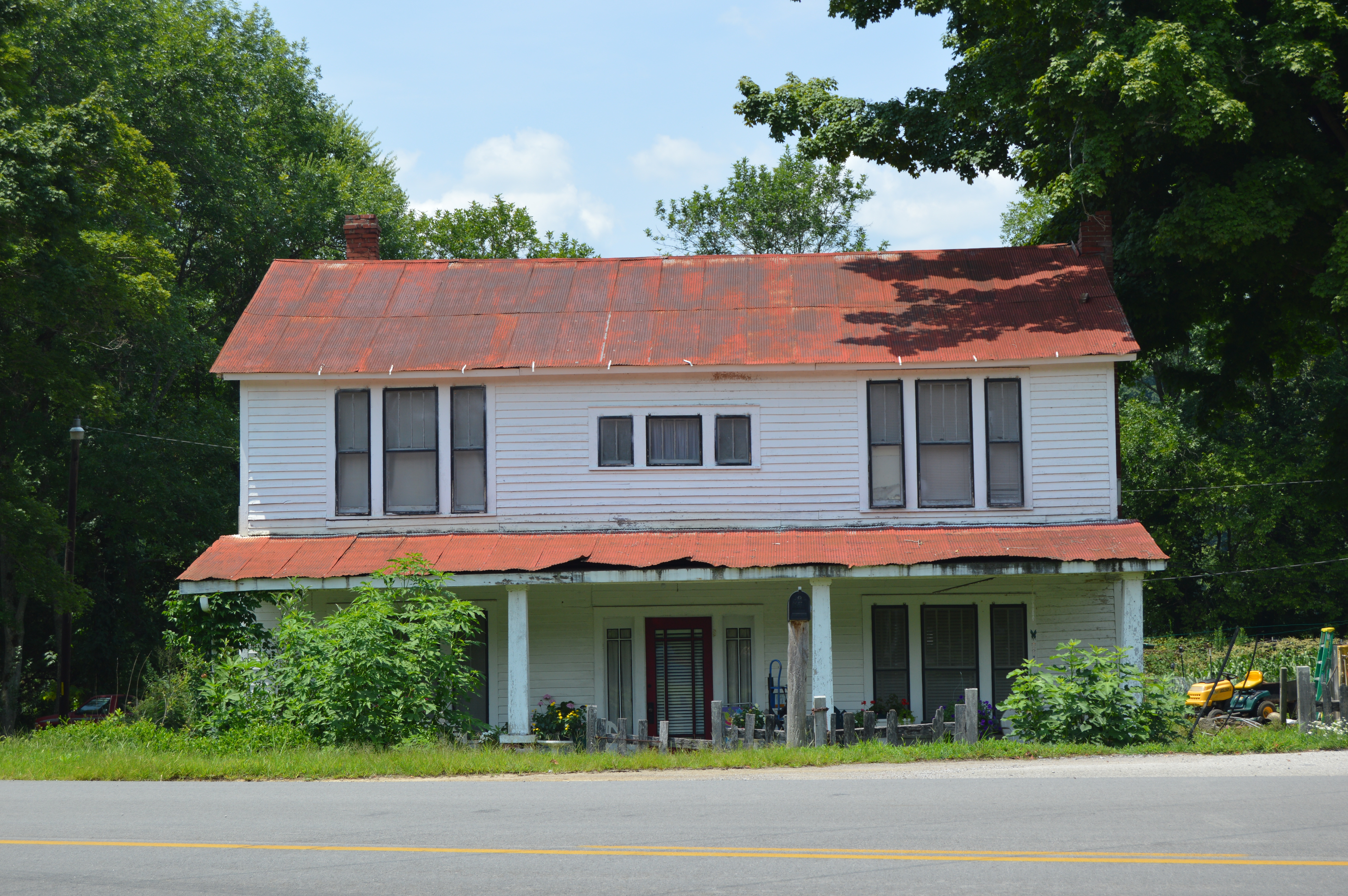

- Location within Kentucky Location within the United States
- Location: Roughly by Wister Wallace Rd., S fork of the Little Barren R., Mitchell-Edwards Rd., and KY 70, Sulphur Well, Kentucky
- Coordinates: 37°06′03″N 85°38′04″W
- Area: 81 acres (33 ha)
- Built: 1860
- Architectural style: Bungalow/craftsman
- NRHP reference No.: 98000932
- Added to NRHP: August 14, 1998

The Sulphur Well Historic District is an 81 acres (33 ha) historic district in Sulphur Well, Kentucky which was listed on the National Register of Historic Places in 1998.

It is roughly bounded by Wister Wallace Road, the southern fork of the Little Barren River, Mitchell-Edwards Road, and Kentucky Route 70. The listing included 37 contributing buildings, a contributing structure, and five contributing sites.

According to its nomination, "Sulphur Well is a good example of a small rural mineral water town in western Kentucky that developed between 1860 and 1949."
