= Caverna High School =

Location
- 2276 S. Dixie Highway; Horse Cave, Kentucky 42749; United States; 37°09′08″N 85°55′53″W

Information
- Type: Public high school
- Motto: "Where Commitment Turns Dreams Into Reality"
- Established: 1837
- School district: Caverna Independent School District
- Principal: Frank Beauchamp
- Teaching staff: 17.76 (FTE)
- Grades: 9-12
- Enrollment: 213 (2023-2024)
- Student to teacher ratio: 11.99
- Colors: Purple; White
- Athletics conference: Kentucky High School Athletic Association
- Team name: Colonels
- Yearbook: The Colonels Times
- Feeder schools: Caverna Middle School
- Website: www.caverna.kyschools.us

Caverna High School is a small public high school located in Horse Cave, Kentucky, United States. Built in 1950, the school is operated by the Caverna Independent Schools, one of only a handful of school districts in Kentucky that are known to operate across county lines (the others being in Burgin and Eminence, cities near a county line whose districts include a small amount of territory in the nearby county, and Corbin, a city that straddles a county line).

== History ==
In 1950, Horse Cave, located in Hart County; Cave City, in Barren County; and the Kentucky Board of Education held a meeting that approved the union of the two districts because of the low student numbers in both school systems. The actual construction of the new school did not start until 1951. Originally the school was going to be named, "Caberma." However, it was decided to stay with the name "Caverna."

== Overview ==
The schools daily production is led by the principal and staff. The management of the financial and other resources are kept by the board of trustees. Trustees are appointed by previous trustees who are stepping down from their positions. The principal and new facility are appointed by the members of the Site Base Decision Committee board. The Site Base council consists of three faculty members and two parents of the students who are not seniors are elected. (Elections are held in October.) The faculty of the school is responsible for rearing students to academic success and to be a role model for all students. The first class ever to graduate from Caverna High school consisted of seven boys and four girls. Now, the enrollment has grown to more than 200 students.

== Academics ==
The curriculum of Caverna High School aims to prepare students for citizenship; future occupations; physical fitness; intellectual, cultural, and moral growth; and critical thinking in everyday life. Classes at Caverna High are held Monday through Friday, from 8:15 am to 3:15 PM CST. The school uses an American GPA grading scale. Many students that graduate from Caverna High School often attend Western Kentucky University afterwards.

=== Graduation requirements ===
Students are required to have eight (8) semesters of high school residence and have completed all the required credits to be eligible for graduation from Caverna High school. Students who are eligible for graduation are expected to have all charges, fees, etc. owed to the school before they receive a signed diploma.

Graduating seniors are ineligible for Valedictorian and Salutatorian if they have not attended Caverna for four years. Effective with the graduating Class of 1999, any ties for the honor of Valedictorian and Salutatorian figured from the 4.0 grade point scale, will be broken by averaging the final numerical grade from all classes taken in grades nine (9) through twelve (12).

=== Caverna High Diploma Requirements ===
Students must successfully complete 24 total credits that consist of:

- 4 credits of English
- 4 credits of math
- 3 credits of social studies
- 4 credits of science
- 1 credit in foreign language
  - 2 credits for college bound students
- 1 credit of humanities (Fine arts also count for this credit)
- 1/2 credit of health
- 1/2 credit of physical education
- 2 seminar credits
- 4 electives

=== College placement ===
- High school graduation rate: 80.0%
- College-going rate: 50.0%
- Percentage with developmental needs in one or more subjects: 83.3%
- Percentage with developmental needs in English: 55.6%
- Percentage with developmental needs in mathematics: 61.1%

as of 2008*

== Student life ==
Caverna High School does not have a dress code. However, there are restrictions to what students can wear during scheduled hours. Boys are not to wear inappropriate or suggestive shirts pertaining to drugs, alcohol, or sexual content. Girls are not to wear non-revealing shirts, straps on shirts may be no less than two fingers wide. No shorts or skirts are to be above the knee. Both genders are not allowed to wear sunglasses or hats. However, dress code is only required in a classroom setting. The yearbook is created by students enrolled into the "yearbook staff" course and is distributed and available at the beginning of the Fall semester the next year. Seniors will be notified when the yearbook is available at Caverna High Schools office.

=== Summer school ===
Summer school is available for students who do not have a D or higher in a course and don't meet the credit requirements to advance a grade. It is a five-week program that begins two weeks after graduation (each year varies).

=== Clubs and organizations ===
- Varsity Academic Team
- Beta Club
- Freshman Academic Team
- FCCLA
- Band
- Guitar Club
- FFA
- Art Club
- Student Council
- Pep Club
- Yearbook Staff
- FCA (Fellowship of Christian Athletes)
- ETS (Educational talent Search)
- TSA (Technology Student Association)
- National Honor Society
- SADD (Students Against Destructive Decisions)

=== Campus facilities ===
The main building is Caverna High School/Caverna Middle School. The high school is located on the second floor of the building while the middle school is on the main floor of the building. Each school shares the band classroom (first floor), detention hall classroom (first floor), the main computer lab (second floor), the cafeteria (first floor), and the gym (first floor) which is attached to the main building, located in the back of the school. On campus, there is the Caverna High School Softball Field, Ralph Dorsey Baseball Field, Caverna High School Tennis Court, and the B.H. Weaver Football Stadium. Off campus, hosted by the Caveland Country Club, the golf team uses the golf course.

== Athletics ==
=== Varsity teams ===
- Fall sports
  - Boys
    - Cross country
    - Football
    - Golf
    - Marching band
  - Girls
    - Cheerleading
    - Golf
    - Volleyball
    - Marching band
- Winter sports
  - Boys
    - Basketball
  - Girls
    - Basketball
    - Cheerleading
- Spring sports
  - Boys
    - Baseball
    - Tennis
    - Track and field
  - Girls
    - Softball
    - Track and field
    - Tennis

== Notable alumni ==
- Clarence Glover, basketball player for Boston Celtics (1971–1973).
- Denny Doyle, baseball player for Philadelphia Phillies (1970–1973), California Angels (1974–1975) and Boston Red Sox (1975–1977).
- Brian Doyle, baseball player for New York Yankees (1978–1981).
