= Stockton-Ray House =

Historic house in Kentucky, United States

- U.S. National Register of Historic Places
- Location within Kentucky Location within the United States
- Nearest city: Edmonton, Kentucky
- Coordinates: 36°59′40″N 85°39′15″W
- Area: less than one acre
- Built: 1808, c.1865
- Architectural style: Federal, Hall & parlor
- NRHP reference No.: 92000289
- Added to NRHP: April 13, 1992

The Stockton-Ray House, near Edmonton in Metcalfe County, Kentucky, was built in 1808. It was listed on the National Register of Historic Places in 1992.

Its original part is a two-story three-bay brick Hall-and-Parlor-plan structure, with end chimneys. A frame addition was added to the rear around 1865.

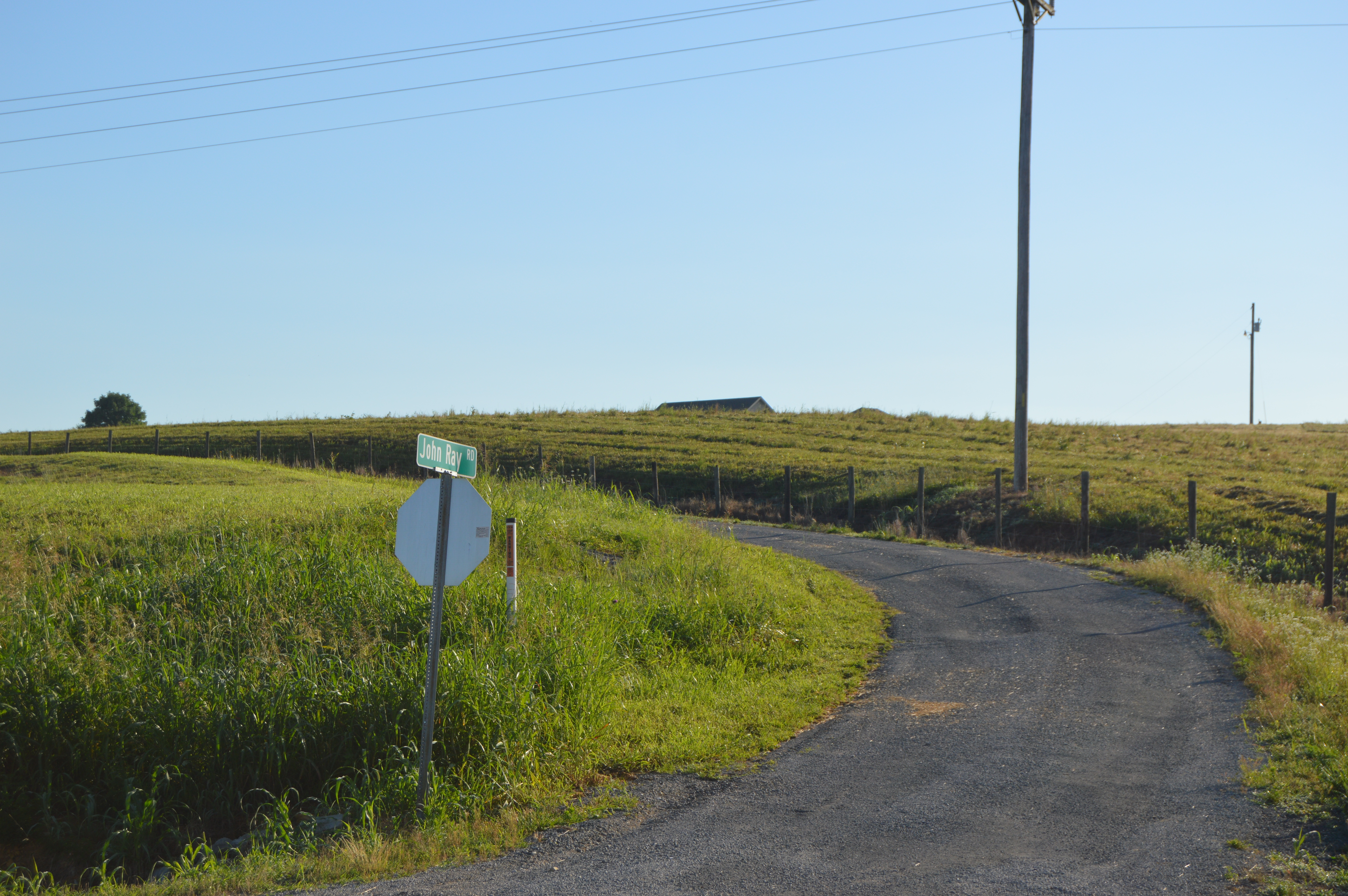
Driveway near house. Roofline visible is not the house, which has two chimneys.

It is located off the junction of U.S. Route 68/Kentucky Route 80 and Cumberland Parkway, about 1.5 miles (2.4 km) northwest of Edmonton.
