= Clarence Glover =

American basketball player (born 1947)

Personal information
- Born: November 1, 1947 (age 79) Horse Cave, Kentucky, U.S.
- Listed height: 6 ft 8 in (2.03 m)
- Listed weight: 210 lb (95 kg)

Career information
- High school: Caverna (Horse Cave, Kentucky)
- College: Western Kentucky (1968–1971)
- NBA draft: 1971: 1st round, 10th overall pick
- Drafted by: Boston Celtics
- Playing career: 1971–1974
- Position: Small forward
- Number: 28

Career history
- 1971–1972: Boston Celtics
- 1972–1974: Hartford Capitols
- Stats at NBA.com
- Stats at Basketball Reference

Clarence Glover (born November 1, 1947) is a retired American National Basketball Association (NBA) player, who played in college at Western Kentucky (1968–1971). Glover was a forward at 6'8" and 210 lb.

== Early life ==
Born in Horse Cave, Kentucky, Glover attended Caverna High School in Horse Cave, where he played both baseball and basketball.

== College career ==
Glover helped lead the Western Kentucky Hilltoppers to the 1971 NCAA Final Four.

In the 1971 NCAA tournament Western Kentucky advanced by defeating Jacksonville 74–72, in-state rival Kentucky 107–83 and Ohio State 81–78 to reach the Final Four. In the Final Four, the Hilltoppers lost to the Villanova Wildcats 92–89 in double overtime. They then defeated Kansas 77–75 in the NCAA Third place game. Glover had 16 points, 17 rebounds and 3 assists against Jacksonville; 18 points, 17 rebounds and 8 assists in the win vs Kentucky; 11 points, 22 rebounds and 2 assists in the win over Ohio State. In the Final Four, Glover had 12 points and 20 rebounds in the loss to Villanova and 10 points 13 points and 3 assists in his career finale in the win vs Kansas.

The 6.8" Glover averaged 8.4 points, 10.9 rebounds and 1.8 assists for the season.

The 1971 Western Kentucky Hilltoppers was the first non-HBU Kentucky collegiate basketball team to start five African-American players. Coach John Oldham started Glover, Jim McDaniels, Jim Rose, Jerry Dunn and Rex Bailey. McDaniels had recruited Glover and the others after signing at WKU. Oldham was pressured not to start all five together, but said "they are my best five players."

For his career at Western Kentucky, Glover averaged 6.9 points, 8.6 rebounds and 1.2 assists in 80 games.

== Professional career ==
Glover was drafted in the 1st Round (#10 overall) in the 1971 NBA draft by the Boston Celtics. Glover was also drafted by the Indiana Pacers of the American Basketball Association (ABA). He was also strongly pursued by the Carolina Cougars of the ABA but chose to sign on with the Celtics mentioning better competition and better money.

Glover wore #28 with the Celtics in 1971–1972. Glover played 25 games for the 56–26 Celtics under Coach Tommy Heinsohn and averaged 2.6 points and 1.8 rebounds in 4.8 minutes per game.

Glover then joined the Hartford Chiefs of the Eastern League. He came back to the Celtics for his second season and was among 18 players for 12 spots. Celtics General Manager Red Auerbach, said: "Glover appears to have poise now and he's improved 200 percent on his outside shot, but he still needs improvement. What bothered me about Clarence when he first joined the team was that he was strung like a violin which is out of tune and always busting. He was releasing the ball for a shot too soon after getting it on the fastbreak and blowing layups. I don't mind a couple of mistakes but he was making too many."

In October 1972, Celtics waived Glover.

== Personal ==
Following his basketball career, Glover had a career in Education and coaching, He began a lengthy career as an administrator in Kentucky Public Schools in 1995, and worked as the assistant principal at Farnsley Middle School. Glover was a co-founder of Frenchburg Academy, a year-round school for high school at-risk students.

Glover has served on numerous higher education boards and is the namesake of the "Clarence Glover Scholarship Fund" at Western Kentucky University.

== Career statistics ==
Legend
| GP | Games played | GS | Games started | MPG | Minutes per game |
| FG% | Field goal percentage | 3P% | 3-point field goal percentage | FT% | Free throw percentage |
| RPG | Rebounds per game | APG | Assists per game | SPG | Steals per game |
| BPG | Blocks per game | PPG | Points per game | **Bold** | Career high |

=== NBA ===
==== Regular season ====
| Year | Team | GP | MPG | FG% | FT% | RPG | APG | PPG |
|---|---|---|---|---|---|---|---|---|
| 1971–72 | Boston | 25 | 4.8 | .455 | .469 | 1.8 | .2 | 2.6 |

==== Playoffs ====
| Year | Team | GP | MPG | FG% | FT% | RPG | APG | PPG |
|---|---|---|---|---|---|---|---|---|
| 1972 | Boston | 3 | 3.3 | .333 | 1.000 | 1.0 | .0 | 2.0 |

== Honors ==
- Glover was inducted into the Western Kentucky Athletics Hall of Fame in 2007.
