= Kentucky Down Under =

Kentucky Down Under Adventure Zoo
- Interactive map of Kentucky Down Under Adventure Zoo
- 37.2029°N 85.9334°W
- Date opened: 1990
- Location: Horse Cave, Kentucky, United States
- Website: www.kentuckydownunder.com

Kentucky Down Under is an Australia-themed animal park located in Horse Cave, Kentucky, United States.

== History ==
In 1990, the park was opened by Bill and Judy Austin to the public.

Bill Austin was manager of Mammoth Onyx Cave (which was later renamed Kentucky Caverns), which his grandfather had purchased in the 1920s. Peacocks and other small animals had been added to the park for visitors to enjoy on the surface in-between cave tours. A herd of American bison was added in the 1970s, followed by the Australian animals in 1990, and the park renamed to "Kentucky Down Under".

== Activities ==
Kentucky Down Under Zoo provides a variety of activities:

- Animal exhibits: Staff located in each area to answer questions. There are "encounter" areas where guides let visitors interact with animals (draft horses, kangaroos, lorikeets, etc.).
- Mammoth Onyx Cave tours: Guides discuss geology and the importance of the cave system.
- Land of the Lorikeets: Walk-in aviary.
- Woolshed: Visitors learn about sheep, herding dogs, and wool production.
- Gem mining: Dig and sift through sand/soil for a variety of gemstones.
- Carriage rides: Guided tour of the zoo via a horse-drawn carriage.

Kentucky Down Under hosts school groups via partly guided tours, with staff in each area of the zoo to answer questions about the exhibited animals; however, chaperons/teachers are responsible for supervising members of their respective groups.

== Animals ==
The zoo has a multitude of animals in their care ranging mostly of Australian but also exotic animals from around the world, including Africa, Europe, and Asia.

- Capybara
- Dromedary camel
- American alligator
- Wolf
- Coatimundi
- Fainting goat
- Woma python
- Dingo
- Laughing kookaburra
- Cockatiel
- Sun conure
- Umbrella cockatoo
- Grey parrot
- Blue-and-yellow macaw
- Scarlet macaw
- Salmon-crested cockatoo
- Ring-tailed lemur
- Rainbow lorikeet
- Sulcata tortoise
- Draft horse
- Red kangaroo
- Eastern grey kangaroo
- Emu
- Mara
- Indian peafowl
- Alpaca
- Miniature horse
- Southdown sheep
- Border Collie
- Dairy cattle
- Serval
- Toucan
- Blue-winged kookaburra
