= Node, Kentucky =

Unincorporated community in Kentucky, United States

- Unincorporated community
- Location within Kentucky Location within the United States
- Coordinates: 37°7′45″N 85°38′38″W
- Country: United States
- State: Kentucky
- County: Metcalfe
- Elevation: 751 ft (229 m)
- Time zone: UTC-5 (Eastern (EST))
  - Summer (DST): UTC-4 (EDT)
- GNIS feature ID: 508714

Node is an unincorporated community located in Metcalfe County, Kentucky, United States.
