= Wisdom, Kentucky =

Unincorporated community in Kentucky, United States

- Unincorporated community
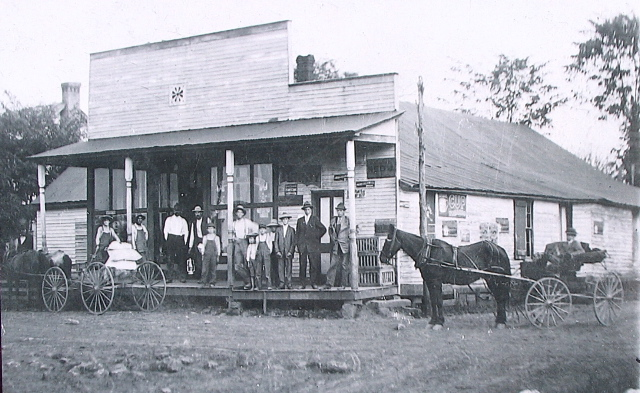
- Young & Shirley Store located at the community center of Wisdom, Kentucky

- Location within Kentucky Location within the United States
- Coordinates: 37°00′14″N 85°43′12″W
- Country: United States
- State: Kentucky
- County: Metcalfe
- Elevation: 938 ft (286 m)
- Time zone: UTC-6 (Central (CST))
  - Summer (DST): UTC-5 (CDT)
- GNIS feature ID: 509389

Wisdom is an unincorporated community located in Metcalfe County, Kentucky, United States. It was also known as Nicols and Old Randolph.

== Geography ==
Wisdom is located in west-central Metcalfe County at 37°00′14″N 85°43′12″W and is part of the Glasgow Micropolitan Area.

U.S. Route 68/Kentucky Route 80 and Kentucky Route 640 intersect at the center of the community, and the Louie B. Nunn Cumberland Parkway passes south of the community center, with the closest access point 3.7 miles east at the Edmonton exit. Edmonton is 7 miles (11 km) to the east, Glasgow is 11 miles (18 km) to the west, and Mammoth Cave National Park is 24 miles (39 km) to the northwest.

White Oak Creek, a small non-navigable waterway, runs through part of the community.

== Climate ==
The climate in this area is characterized by hot, humid summers and generally mild to cool winters. According to the Köppen Climate Classification system, Wisdom has a humid subtropical climate, abbreviated "Cfa" on climate maps.

== History ==
On March 21, 1846, a post office was established at the intersection of present-day highways KY 640 and US 68/KY 80. The community was named Randolph, in honor of John Randolph, U.S. Senator and Congressman from Virginia. Edward V. Cummins served as the first postmaster. The community began declining in the 1860s, with businesses closing. In 1873 the post office closed as well. Residents of a newly forming community 2.5 miles south petitioned to have the post office relocated there and on August 12, 1873, it was opened, with the name Randolph moving to the new community.

In 1890, G.S. Neville built and began operating a store at the old Randolph site and a new community began to spring up. Around 1894, Em Evans took over the operation of the store and petitioned for a new post office to be established. The name Wisdom was submitted, in honor of Silas Henry Wisdom (1849–1898), first Superintendent of Schools for Metcalfe County. The post office was approved and Wisdom officially became a community.

== Business and economy ==
Wisdom's main industry remains agriculture, with several large scale farming operations located within or nearby the community. Beef and dairy cattle are both raised, as well as poultry. The most prevalent crops are tobacco, corn, soybeans, hay and forage.

Residents who are employed outside of agriculture typically work in either Edmonton or Glasgow.

The only current public business in Wisdom is Gilley Shooting Supply, located approximately 0.2 miles south of the community center. Hunley's Grocery and Mosby's Used Cars are approximately 1.5 miles west of the community center. A Dollar General store approximately 1.1 miles west of the community center opened in 2024.

Several old store buildings still exist.

== Politics ==
Wisdom, as a part of Metcalfe County, is represented by the following federal and state elected officials:

- U.S. Senators Mitch McConnell (R) and Rand Paul (R)
- 1st District U.S. Representative James Comer (R)
- 16th District State Senator Max Wise (R)
- 21st District State Representative Amy Neighbors (R)

In addition to countywide officials, the community is represented by 1st District Magistrate Harvey Hawkins and 1st District Board of Education member Wes Jolly.

The community is part of the Wisdom-Randolph voting precinct, which has its location at Wisdom Christian Academy.

== Education ==
The Wisdom community is serviced by the Metcalfe County school system. The district has one elementary school, one middle school and one high school. Josh Hurt is the Superintendent of Schools.

A private school, Wisdom Faith Christian Academy, which is affiliated with Wisdom Faith Community Church, is also located in the community.

Prior to the consolidation of schools, Wisdom was home to Dripping Springs, a one-room schoolhouse located across the road from Dripping Springs Baptist Church.

== Notable residents ==
Wisdom, Kentucky is the home of Richard and Fred Young, members of the Grammy Award-winning band, The Kentucky Headhunters. It is also the home of John Fred Young, son of Richard Young, who is a member of Black Stone Cherry, a hard rock band.

Previous notable residents include William D. Allbright, who served as State Representative for the 35th District from 1910 to 1912. He was a champion of women's suffrage in Kentucky. Representative Allbright, a former County Assessor for Metcalfe County, was a Union veteran of the Civil War and served as a Republican. In his private life, he worked as a farmer and attended Dripping Springs Baptist Church.

== Cultural references ==
Nashville radio personality Eldon Thacker frequently mentions Wisdom, along with other Metcalfe County communities, on his weekly radio show on WLAC. The show has parody commercials of businesses located both in Wisdom and Knob Lick.

== Religious life ==
Wisdom is the home to three active church congregations:

- Dripping Springs Baptist Church
- Wisdom Cumberland Presbyterian Church
- Wisdom Faith Community Church

Dripping Springs Baptist Church is one of the oldest churches in the region. The church was constituted February 3, 1798 while it was still part of Barren County - now Metcalfe County. It was originally located about midway between Glasgow and Edmonton. It was first known as the Sinks of Beaver Creek Baptist Church until Sept of that year. The name was changed to Dripping Springs supposedly because of the location for the church building being near a large rock that had a dripping spring.

The first church was built about 1800, a log structure, and was 1 1/2 stories tall. There was a gallery above with seats for the men if the lower section was full. In the summer of 1874, a new church building was erected that was 2 stories tall. In 1890 another church was built and in 1961 the current building.

== Community organizations ==
The Wisdom Homemakers remain an active and vital part of the community.

== Annual events ==
Wisdom is a favorite stop for many during the 400-Mile Sale, which takes place along U.S. Highway 68 during the first weekend of June. The event features yard sales from Paris, Tennessee to Maysville, Kentucky.

== Official designations ==
Dripping Springs Baptist Church is the site of a Kentucky Historical Marker. The text of the marker reads, "Organized as Baptist 'Sinks of Beaver Creek,' 1798, at William Blakely home. Services continuous since first building about 1799, log cabin. In 1874, hand dressed yellow poplar structure replaced original. Present building erected in 1961. Name changed, but same organization continued. Over the years members have withdrawn to form other churches in the area."

Kentucky Highway 640, which crosses U.S. Highway 68 in Wisdom, is officially known as Kentucky Headhunters Band Highway. The designation was part of a bill sponsored by State Representative Bart Rowland (R-Tompkinsville) during the 2013 Kentucky General Assembly.
