= Center, Kentucky =

Unincorporated community in Kentucky, United States

- Unincorporated community
- Location within Kentucky Location within the United States
- Coordinates: 37°8′32″N 85°41′35″W
- Country: United States
- State: Kentucky
- County: Metcalfe
- Founded: early 1800s
- Founder: Joseph Philpot
- Elevation: 804 ft (245 m)
- Time zone: UTC-6 (Central (CST))
  - Summer (DST): UTC-5 (CDT)
- ZIP codes: 42214
- GNIS feature ID: 489262

Center is an unincorporated community located in Metcalfe County, Kentucky, United States. The community is part of the Glasgow Micropolitan Statistical Area.

== History ==
Center, also known in the past as Frederick or Lafayette, got its name from its location, equidistant from four county seats.
