= Goodluck, Kentucky =

Unincorporated community in Kentucky, United States

- Unincorporated community
- Location within Kentucky Location within the United States
- Coordinates: 36°55′31″N 85°38′30″W
- Country: United States
- State: Kentucky
- County: Metcalfe
- Elevation: 823 ft (251 m)
- Time zone: UTC-5 (Eastern (EST))
  - Summer (DST): UTC-4 (EDT)
- GNIS feature ID: 508112

Goodluck is an unincorporated community located in Metcalfe County, Kentucky, United States.

A post office called Goodluck was established in 1894, and remained in operation until 1954. Goodluck has been noted for its unusual place name.
