= Centennial Composers Collection =

Box set by Beegie Adair
- Released: October 13, 2002
- Genre: Jazz
- Length: 271:00
- Label: Green Hill Records

Beegie Adair chronology
I'll Take Romance (2002)	Centennial Composers Collection (2002)	Days of Wine and Roses (2003)

Professional ratings
Review scores
Source	Rating
AllMusic	4.5/5 stars

Centennial Composers Collection is a six-CD box set. Each disc is devoted to one composer of the Great American Songbook and American musical theater genres. The composers of this collection are Richard Rodgers, Duke Ellington, Hoagy Carmichael, George Gershwin, Irving Berlin and Jerome Kern. These discs have also been released individually.

== Critical reception ==
Paula Edelstein of AllMusic writes, "With all due respect to many reissues of classic Broadway tunes by various recording labels, this box set sets a new standard for music that has stood the test of time but is played in a different time and space by a modern woman. Adair is probably the first female to tackle a project of this magnitude and therefore makes this set an innovative jewel in terms of accomplishing "the impossible"; it proves that great works are performed not by strength, but by perseverance."

C. Michael Bailey of All About Jazz starts his review by saying this collection is "A Superb Introduction to the Great American Song Book..." and goes on to say, "This release honors both Ms. Adair and Green Hill Records, each who had the guts to present this grand canon with all of the grace and aplomb of creating high art."

Chet Williamson of Rambles ends his review with this statement:"Those who listen for something edgy and new will not find it here, but what they will hear is something that we don't hear all that much anymore and often take for granted when we do -- classic songs, played with class, verve and taste. Yes, it's all a bit retro, but it's done impeccably, and if it makes you hum along or wish you had a dance floor handy, it's achieved its purpose."

Leonid Auskern of Jazz Square begins his review, "A solid box set with the bold title "Composers of the Century". I must say that in the title there is no advertising stretch, as someone might think."

The Tennessee Jazz & Blues Society did an article about Adair's talk/music radio show on NPR, Improvised Thoughts, and remarked on this release, "Her six-CD Centennial Composers Collection of tunes by Rodgers, Gershwin, Kern, Ellington, Carmichael and Berlin became an instant collectible classic."

Christina Lord of Creations magazine writes, "This is a collection of the best American songs written during the first half of the 20th century. Classic and timeless, this nostalgic treasure is a wonderful gift for yourself or someone you love."

== Track listing ==
All tracks are written by each disc's subject composer unless otherwise noted. Lyricists are not listed as all songs are instrumental.

Beegie Adair Plays the Songs of Richard Rodgers
No.	Title	Length
1.	"Have You Met Miss Jones?"	3:13
2.	"The Lady Is a Tramp"	3:08
3.	"Bewitched"	4:03
4.	"Dancing on the Ceiling"	3:06
5.	"My Romance"	3:25
6.	"It Never Entered My Mind"	2:40
7.	"Where or When"	4:32
8.	"I Could Write a Book"	2:47
9.	"Spring Is Here"	3:37
10.	"You Took Advantage of Me"	3:21
11.	"Manhattan"	3:38
12.	"My Funny Valentine"	4:30
Total length:		42:00

Beegie Adair Plays the Music of Duke Ellington
No.	Title	Writer(s)	Length
1.	"Don't Get Around Much Anymore"		4:32
2.	"In a Sentimental Mood"		4:29
3.	"Satin Doll"	Duke Ellington; Billy Strayhorn	3:48
4.	"Solitude"		3:27
5.	"Caravan"	Duke Ellington; Juan Tizol	3:38
6.	"Sophisticated Lady"		4:19
7.	"I'm Beginning to See the Light"	Duke Ellington; Johnny Hodges; Harry James; Don George	3:39
8.	"Mood Indigo"	Duke Ellington; Barney Bigard	4:08
9.	"It Don't Mean a Thing (If It Ain't Got That Swing)"		2:43
10.	"Day Dream"	Billy Strayhorn	3:27
11.	"Take the "A" Train"	Billy Strayhorn	3:09
12.	"All Too Soon"		3:09
Total length:			44:28

The Nearness of You: Romantic Songs of Hoagy Carmichael
No.	Title	Length
1.	"Georgia on My Mind"	3:45
2.	"In the Cool, Cool, Cool of the Evening"	3:15
3.	"Heart and Soul"	3:11
4.	"Skylark"	4:25
5.	"Ole Buttermilk Sky"	3:49
6.	"Stardust"	3:39
7.	"Ivy"	4:08
8.	"The Nearness of You"	4:19
9.	"Small Fry"	2:54
10.	"Memphis in June"	3:29
11.	"Two Sleepy People"	3:23
12.	"One Morning in May"	2:55
13.	"I Get Along Without You Very Well"	3:22
Total length:		46:34

Embraceable You: Romantic Songs of George Gershwin
No.	Title	Length
1.	"'S Wonderful"	3:19
2.	"Our Love Is Here to Stay"	3:36
3.	"Someone to Watch Over Me"	4:18
4.	"Fascinating Rhythm"	3:07
5.	"I've Got a Crush on You"	3:43
6.	"Love Walked in"	3:41
7.	"Foggy Day"	3:36
8.	"Embraceable You"	4:04
9.	"They Can't Take That Away from Me"	4:04
10.	"Soon"	3:24
11.	"But Not for Me"	3:37
12.	"Summertime"	4:30
Total length:		44:59

Beegie Adair Plays the Music of Irving Berlin
No.	Title	Length
1.	"Alexander's Ragtime Band"	3:20
2.	"Cheek to Cheek"	4:08
3.	"How Deep Is the Ocean"	4:27
4.	"Say It Isn't So"	4:05
5.	"Easter Parade"	3:38
6.	"Always"	3:03
7.	"Blue Skies"	3:16
8.	"They Say It's Wonderful"	3:52
9.	"Isn't This a Lovely Day"	4:00
10.	"Remember"	3:17
11.	"A Pretty Girl Is Like a Melody"	3:46
12.	"White Christmas"	3:26
13.	"God Bless America"	2:51
Total length:		47:09

The Way You Look Tonight: The Romantic Songs of Jerome Kern
No.	Title	Length
1.	"The Way You Look Tonight"	3:15
2.	"Pick Yourself Up"	2:29
3.	"Can't Help Lovin' Dat Man"	3:40
4.	"I'm Old Fashioned"	3:35
5.	"A Fine Romance"	2:55
6.	"All the Things You Are"	3:44
7.	"The Song Is You"	3:11
8.	"The Last Time I Saw Paris"	3:13
9.	"Yesterdays"	4:10
10.	"They Didn't Believe Me"	3:27
11.	"Smoke Gets in Your Eyes"	4:03
12.	"Long Ago and Far Away"	4:08
13.	"Old Man River"	4:00
Total length:		45:50

== Musicians ==
- Beegie Adair – piano
- Roger Spencer – double bass
- Chris Brown – percussion
