= Sam Ray House =

Historic house in Arkansas, United States

- U.S. National Register of Historic Places
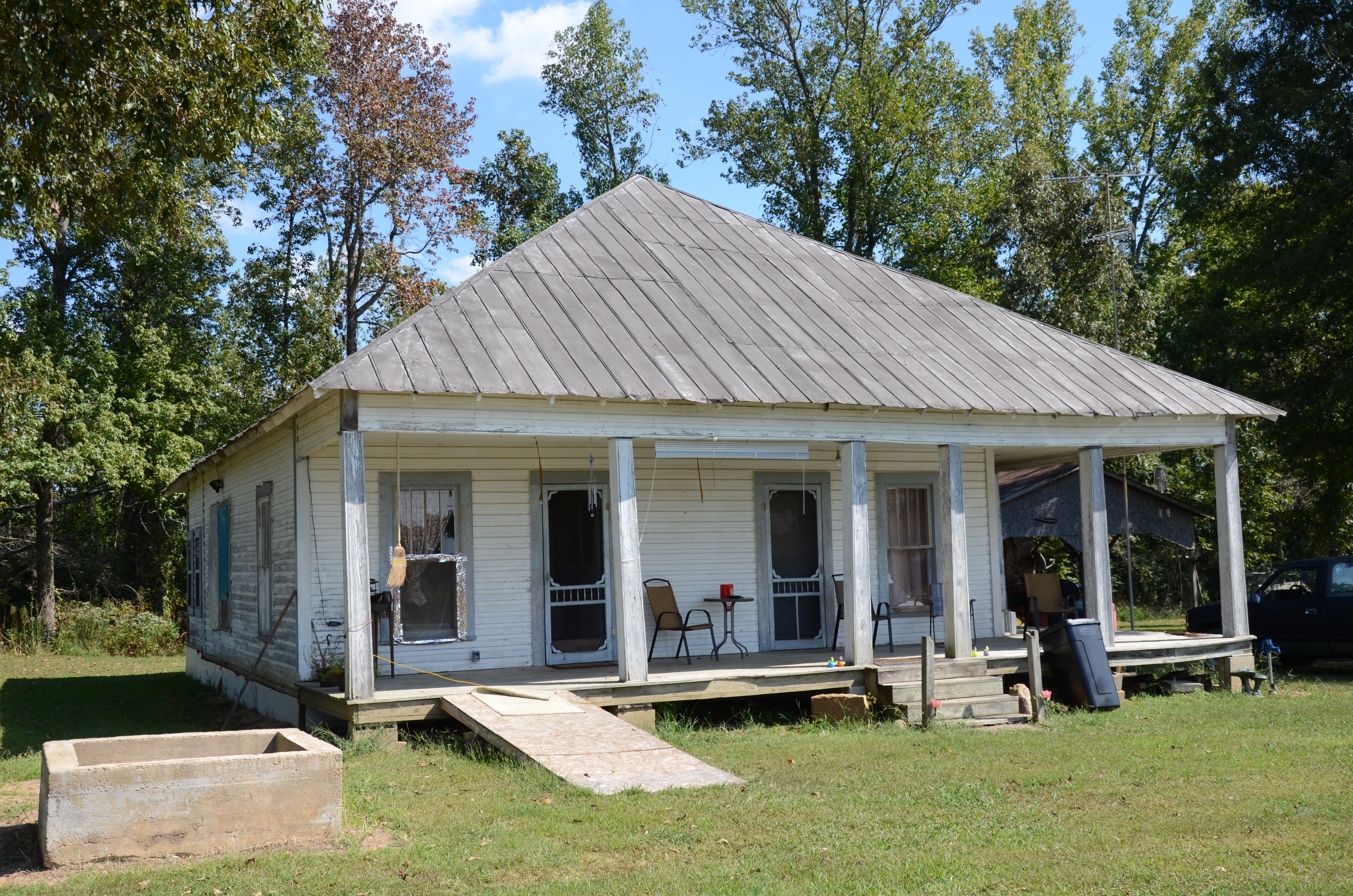

- Location within Arkansas Location within the United States
- Nearest city: Clay, Arkansas
- Coordinates: 35°24′2″N 91°46′58″W
- Area: less than one acre
- Built: 1915
- Architectural style: Vernacular double-pile, French Creole
- MPS: White County MPS
- NRHP reference No.: 91001296
- Added to NRHP: July 23, 1992

The Sam Ray House is a historic house in rural northern White County, Arkansas. It is located northeast of Clay, on the east side of Arkansas Highway 305 just south of Sunrise Drive. It is a single story wood frame double-pile structure, topped by a hip roof that extends over the porch on two sides. Built about 1915, it is an extremely rare example of a French Creole style of architecture within the county.

The house was listed on the National Register of Historic Places in 1992.

== See also ==
- National Register of Historic Places listings in White County, Arkansas
