= The Times Journal =

The Times-Journal
- Type: Weekly newspaper
- Format: Broadsheet
- Owner(s): Russell County Newspapers, LLC; Jobe Publishing, Inc.
- Editor: Derek Aaron
- Founded: October 13, 1949
- Headquarters: Russell Springs, Kentucky
- Website: RussellCountyNewspapers.com

The Times-Journal is a weekly newspaper based in Russell Springs, Kentucky, and serving Russell County. Owned by Russell County Newspaper, LLC, and operated by Jobe Publishing, Inc., it is a sister newspaper to The Russell County News-Register.
