= Beaumont, Kentucky =

Unincorporated community in Kentucky, United States

- Unincorporated community
- Location within Kentucky Location within the United States
- Coordinates: 36°52′32″N 85°39′7″W
- Country: United States
- State: Kentucky
- County: Metcalfe
- Elevation: 1,073 ft (327 m)
- Time zone: UTC-6 (Central (CST))
  - Summer (DST): UTC-5 (CDT)
- ZIP codes: 42124
- GNIS feature ID: 486599

Beaumont is an unincorporated community in Metcalfe County, Kentucky, United States.
