= Charles Dougherty (baseball) =

American baseball player (1879–1939)

- Pitcher
- Born: October 26, 1879; Summer Shade, Kentucky, U.S.
- Died: July 12, 1939 (aged 59); Chicago, Illinois, U.S.
- Batted: Left Threw: Left

debut
- 1909, for the Leland Giants

Last appearance
- 1915, for the Chicago Giants

Teams
- Leland Giants (1909–1911); Chicago American Giants (1911–1915); Club Fé (1911)–1912)

Charles "Pat" Dougherty (October 26, 1879 – July 12, 1939) was an American Negro leagues pitcher for several years before the founding of the first Negro National League.

Sportswriter and fellow player Jimmy Smith put Dougherty on his 1909 "All American Team."

Dougherty died at the age of 59 in Chicago, Illinois. He is buried at Lincoln Cemetery at Blue Island, Illinois.
