= Cave City, Kentucky =

- City
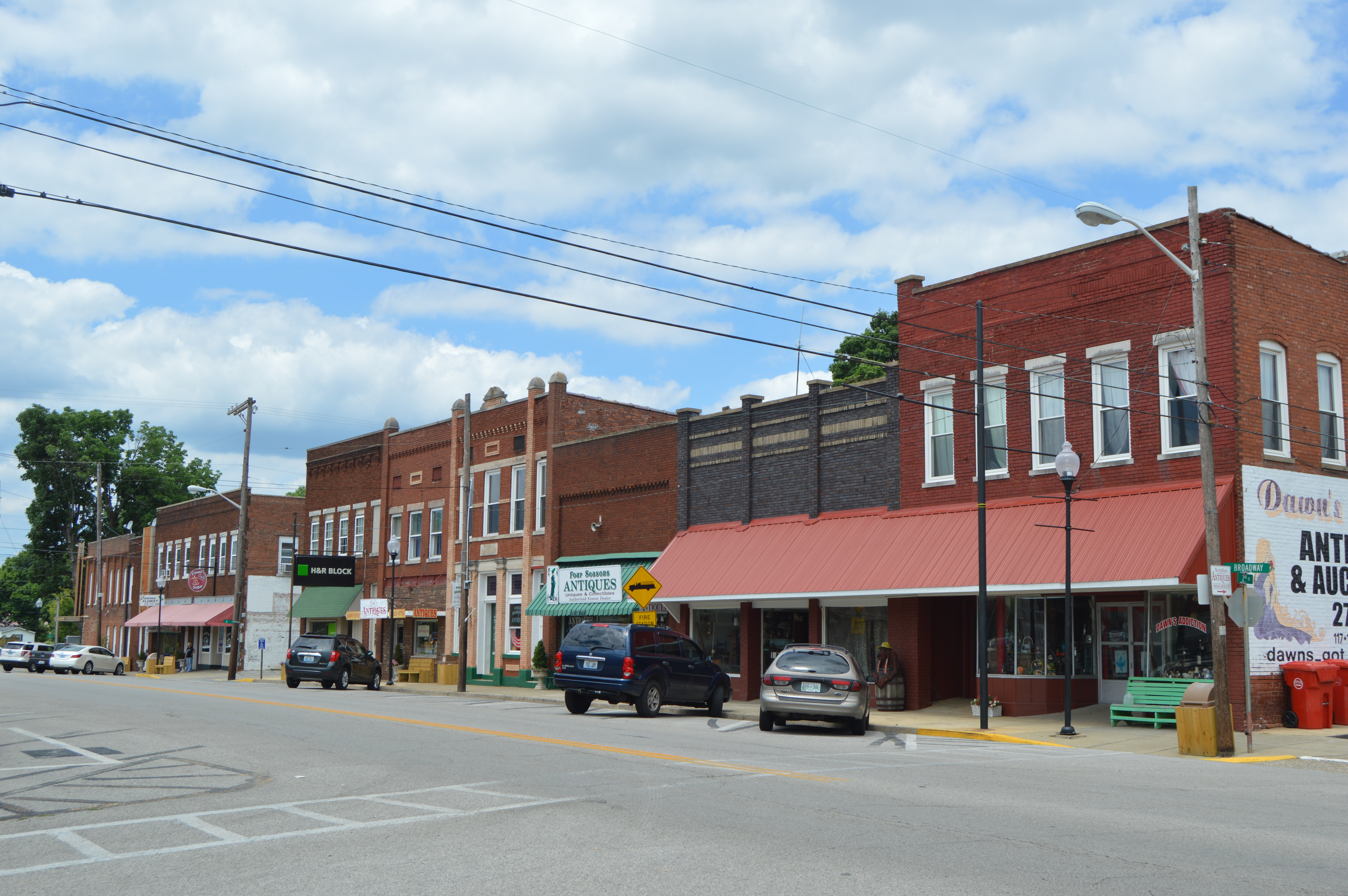
- Broadway in Cave City

- Seal
- Motto: "Home of Mammoth Cave"
- Location of Cave City in Barren County, Kentucky.
- Coordinates: 37°8′14″N 85°57′25″W
- Country: United States
- State: Kentucky
- County: Barren

Area
  - Total: 4.43 sq mi (11.47 km^{2})
  - Land: 4.41 sq mi (11.42 km^{2})
  - Water: 0.019 sq mi (0.05 km^{2})
- Elevation: 633 ft (193 m)

Population (2020)
  - Total: 2,356
  - Estimate (2022): 2,356
  - Density: 534.2/sq mi (206.27/km^{2})
- Time zone: UTC-6 (Central (CST))
  - Summer (DST): UTC-5 (CDT)
- ZIP code: 42127
- Area codes: 270 & 364
- FIPS code: 21-13492
- GNIS feature ID: 0489114
- Website: cavecity.ky.gov

Cave City is a home rule-class city in Barren County, Kentucky, in the United States. The population was 2,356 at the 2020 census. It is part of the Glasgow Micropolitan Statistical Area.

== Geography ==
Cave City is located in the northwestern portion of Barren County at 37°8′14″N 85°57′25″W (37.137130, -85.956958). U.S. Route 31W (Dixie Highway) passes through the center of the city, and Interstate 65 passes to the west of downtown, with access from Exit 53 (Kentucky Route 70/Mammoth Cave Road). Elizabethtown is 44 miles (71 km) to the north, and Louisville is 85 miles (137 km) north via I-65. Bowling Green is 31 miles (50 km) to the southwest, and Nashville, Tennessee, is 91 miles (146 km) to the southwest via I-65. The center of Mammoth Cave National Park is 10 miles (16 km) to the west via Kentucky Route 70. Glasgow, the Barren County seat, is located 10 miles (16 km) to the southeast via Kentucky Route 90.

According to the United States Census Bureau, Cave City has a total area of 4.4 square miles (11.4 km^{2}), of which 0.019 square miles (0.05 km^{2}), or 0.46%, is water.

== History ==
The site upon which Cave City stands was acquired in October 1853 by the Knob City Land Company, composed of Messrs. Graham, Quigly, Adams, and Hopson, all of whom were from Louisville and envisioned the place as a resort town due to its proximity to Mammoth Cave. The town was incorporated in 1866.

Originally, 200 acres (81 ha) of what would become the town site was acquired by James Perry in a 1798 land grant. In 1811, Henry Roundtree (an assignee of James Perry) sold the land to John Owens for $190. Owens added 142.5 acres (57.7 ha) to the tract. After his death, his executor sold his 342½ acres to Thomas T. Duke for $1,732.00. Duke, in turn, sold the entire tract to the Knob City Land Company. Duke received $6,850.00 for the land, or $20 per acre—a record amount for a land sale in Barren County at that time.

The Knob City Land Company surveyed and laid out the town, the main streets being 80 feet (24 m) wide, and began to sell lots about the same time as the Louisville & Nashville Railroad came through Barren County. The first train arrived at Cave City in 1859. The town took its name from a cave within the town limits, not nearby Mammoth Cave. A small creek ran through the cave which the L&N Railroad used as a source of water. The creek was called "Sink Hole Spring" and was the only water supply for the town at the time. The Cave City post office was established in January 1860 and Beverly Daniel Curd appointed the first post-master. He moved the post office established in 1850 at Woodland (about a mile north) to Cave City.

In January 1870, a tornado known as the Cave City storm killed over 20 people in Barren County and destroyed the hamlet of Prewitt's Knob.

== Demographics ==
Historical population
Census	Pop.	Note	%±
1870	387		—
1890	362		—
1900	538		48.6%
1910	645		19.9%
1920	690		7.0%
1930	773		12.0%
1940	960		24.2%
1950	1,119		16.6%
1960	1,418		26.7%
1970	1,818		28.2%
1980	2,098		15.4%
1990	1,953		−6.9%
2000	1,880		−3.7%
2010	2,240		19.1%
2020	2,356		5.2%
2022 (est.)	2,356		0.0%
U.S. Decennial Census

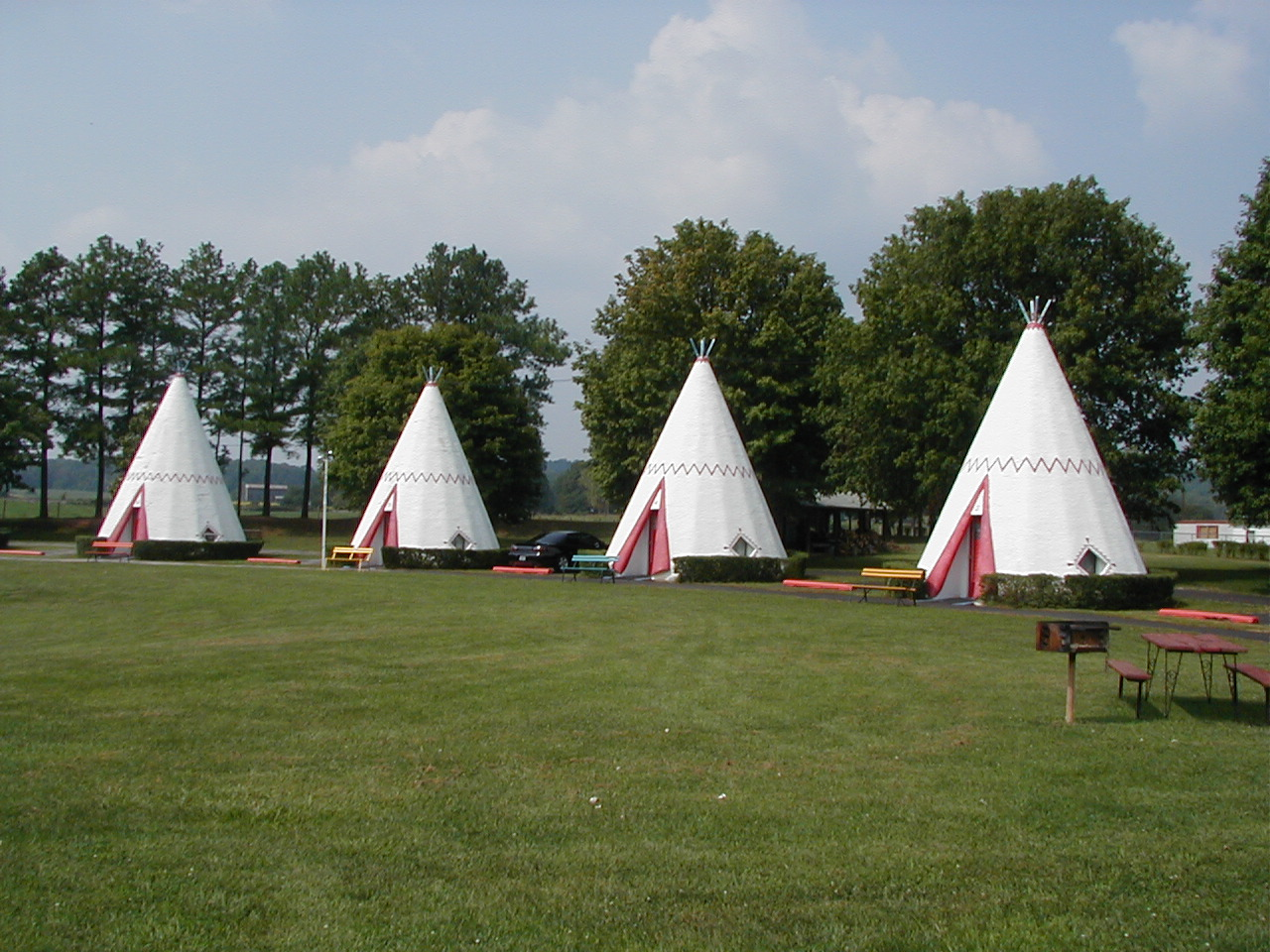
The Wigwam Village Motel, built in 1937, is one of Cave City's unique attractions and located on the Historic National Register. It was the 2nd of 7 Wigwam Villages constructed across America, and one of only 3 now in existence.

=== 2020 census ===
As of the 2020 census, Cave City had a population of 2,356. The median age was 40.7 years. 22.9% of residents were under the age of 18 and 17.8% of residents were 65 years of age or older. For every 100 females there were 93.8 males, and for every 100 females age 18 and over there were 91.1 males age 18 and over.

81.7% of residents lived in urban areas, while 18.3% lived in rural areas.

There were 1,091 households in Cave City, of which 28.8% had children under the age of 18 living in them. Of all households, 32.3% were married-couple households, 23.7% were households with a male householder and no spouse or partner present, and 34.7% were households with a female householder and no spouse or partner present. About 37.9% of all households were made up of individuals and 16.4% had someone living alone who was 65 years of age or older.

There were 1,212 housing units, of which 10.0% were vacant. The homeowner vacancy rate was 3.0% and the rental vacancy rate was 5.9%.

Racial composition as of the 2020 census
Race	Number	Percent
White	1,997	84.8%
Black or African American	164	7.0%
American Indian and Alaska Native	6	0.3%
Asian	22	0.9%
Native Hawaiian and Other Pacific Islander	0	0.0%
Some other race	51	2.2%
Two or more races	116	4.9%
Hispanic or Latino (of any race)	85	3.6%

=== 2000 census ===
As of the census of 2000, there were 1,880 people, 844 households, and 544 families residing in the city. The population density was 435.2 inhabitants per square mile (168.0/km^{2}). There were 914 housing units at an average density of 211.6 per square mile (81.7/km^{2}). The racial makeup of the city was 90.74% White, 7.13% African American, 0.16% Native American, 1.12% Asian, 0.05% Pacific Islander, 0.05% from other races, and 0.74% from two or more races. Hispanic or Latino of any race were 0.69% of the population.

There were 844 households, out of which 26.1% had children under the age of 18 living with them, 47.7% were married couples living together, 12.9% had a female householder with no husband present, and 35.5% were non-families. 32.7% of all households were made up of individuals, and 17.9% had someone living alone who was 65 years of age or older. The average household size was 2.23 and the average family size was 2.79.

In the city, the population was spread out, with 22.2% under the age of 18, 8.1% from 18 to 24, 26.1% from 25 to 44, 24.3% from 45 to 64, and 19.3% who were 65 years of age or older. The median age was 41 years. For every 100 females, there were 89.9 males. For every 100 females age 18 and over, there were 84.6 males.

The median income for a household in the city was $22,257, and the median income for a family was $30,179. Males had a median income of $28,098 versus $20,214 for females. The per capita income for the city was $15,346. About 18.6% of families and 23.2% of the population were below the poverty line, including 32.4% of those under age 18 and 24.9% of those age 65 or over.

== Business and economy ==
Cave City's main industry is tourism, thanks to its proximity to Mammoth Cave National Park. A number of motels and restaurants are located at the Exit 53 interchange of Interstate 65 and Kentucky State Routes 70 and 90, which cater to tourists visiting the area. The city operates one of south-central Kentucky's first convention centers hosting over 40,000 attendees per year, with an annual economic impact over $435,000 in lodging, restaurant and attraction revenue. Cave City has long been host to Mammoth Cave visitors; in the era of passenger rail travel, trains of the Louisville and Nashville Railroad would discharge tourists there, who would then be shuttled to the cave.

Aside from tourism, the city's economy is largely retail focusing on antiques and consignment stores.

== Political ==
Cave City is governed by a mayor and an elected city council. The current mayor (as of 2016) is Dwayne Hatcher. Previous mayor Bob Hunt attracted attention by casting the tie-breaking vote against an ordinance considered by the council, which would have banned the use of tobacco in public places. (The region around Cave City is one of the largest tobacco-producing areas in the world.)

== Liquor in Cave City ==
On November 8, 2005, Cave City voters passed a Liquor-by-the-Drink referendum that for the first time in over 50 years allowed alcohol to be served in restaurants that met certain qualifications.

On July 22, 2014, Cave City voters approved full retail sales of packaged alcohol. An ordinance governing package sales was approved by the city council in September 2014, with license fees to be set in October. Sales began several months later, after state-mandated waiting periods and issuance of initial licenses.

== Education ==
Students in Cave City attend the institutions of Caverna Independent School District. Caverna Elementary School is based in Cave City; while the Caverna Middle/High School facility is located just across the county line into Hart County, on the southern outskirts of Horse Cave.

== Notable people ==
- Beegie Adair, musician
- Leticia Cline, journalist and model
- Floyd Collins, cave explorer and cave accident victim
