= Edmonson News =

Weekly newspaper in Brownsville, Kentucky, United States

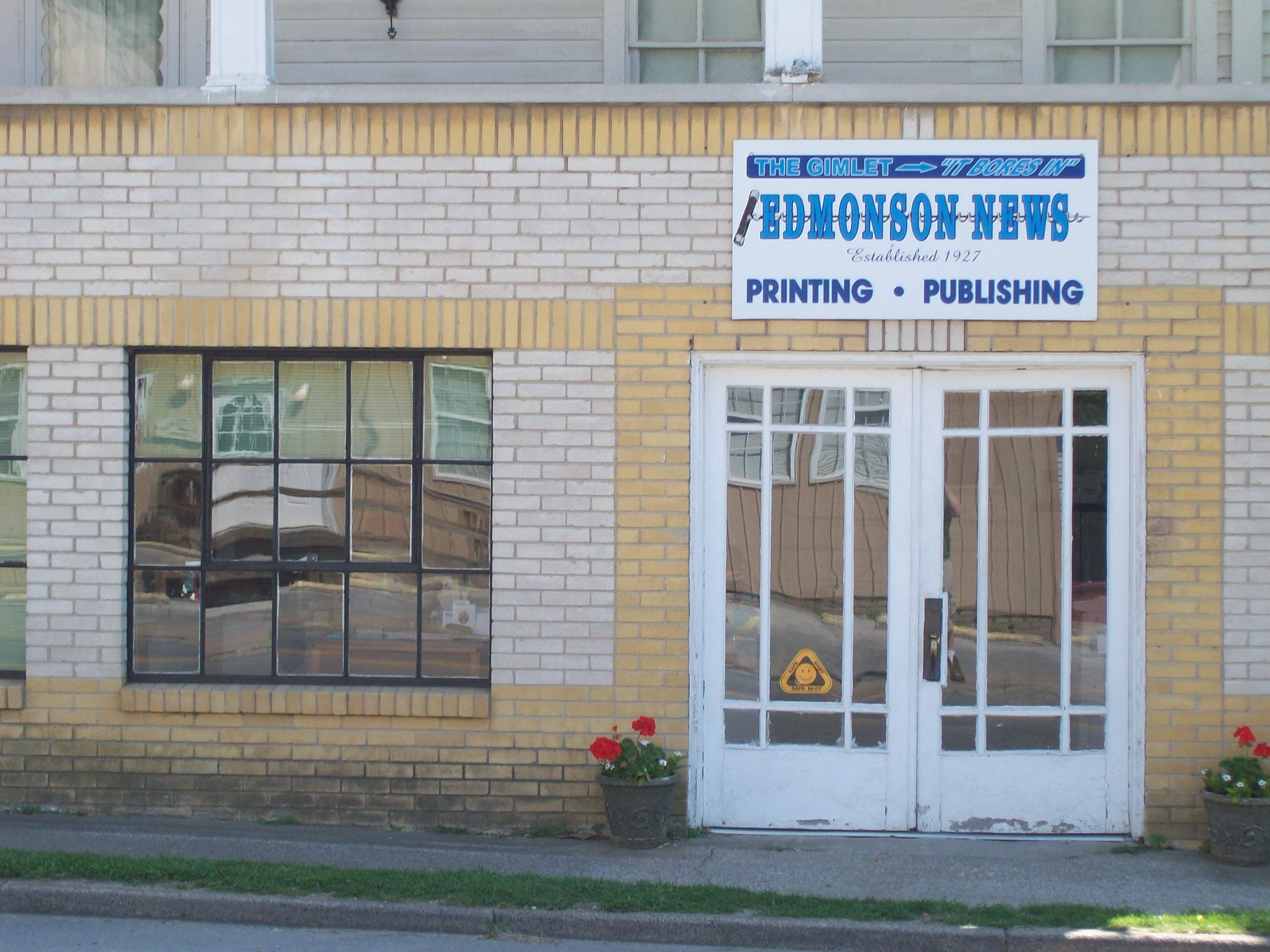
- Edmonson News Publishing Offices in downtown Brownsville
- Type: Weekly newspaper
- Format: Broadsheet
- Owner: Jobe Publishing, Inc.
- Publisher: Bill Canty
- Editor: Cathy Canty
- Founded: September 1927; 98 years ago
- Headquarters: Brownsville, Kentucky
- Circulation: 3,704 weekly
- Website: jpinews.com/the-edmonson-news-home

The Edmonson News, also known by its alternative title The Gimlet, is a weekly newspaper based in Brownsville, Kentucky, and serving Edmonson County in west-central Kentucky, including Brownsville and surrounding communities. Although is published on Wednesdays every week (excluding the final week prior to New Year's Day), its date line on the front page is printed as the Thursday after publishing.

== History ==
The Edmonson News was first established as The Edmonson County Newspaper by Perry Meloan in September 1927. Bill Canty worked in partnership with Meloan until the latter man died in 1965. After Meloan's death, Canty took over the news paper. Bill Canty has been publishing the newspaper with weekly happenings in the area for a total of 50 years. His wife, Cathy joined the business after their 1971 marriage.

In the wake of Bill and Cathy Canty's retirement plans in 2016, the Edmonson News was purchased by Horse Cave-based Jobe Publishing, Inc., the owner of county newspapers in neighboring Barren, Butler, and Hart counties, along with two additional weekly newspapers in Metcalfe and Monroe Counties. The sale's was finalized on February 1, 2016. Along with a new front-page design, an online version of the Edmonson News was also made available to subscribers for the first time.
