= Metcalfe County Kentucky Courthouse =

- U.S. National Register of Historic Places
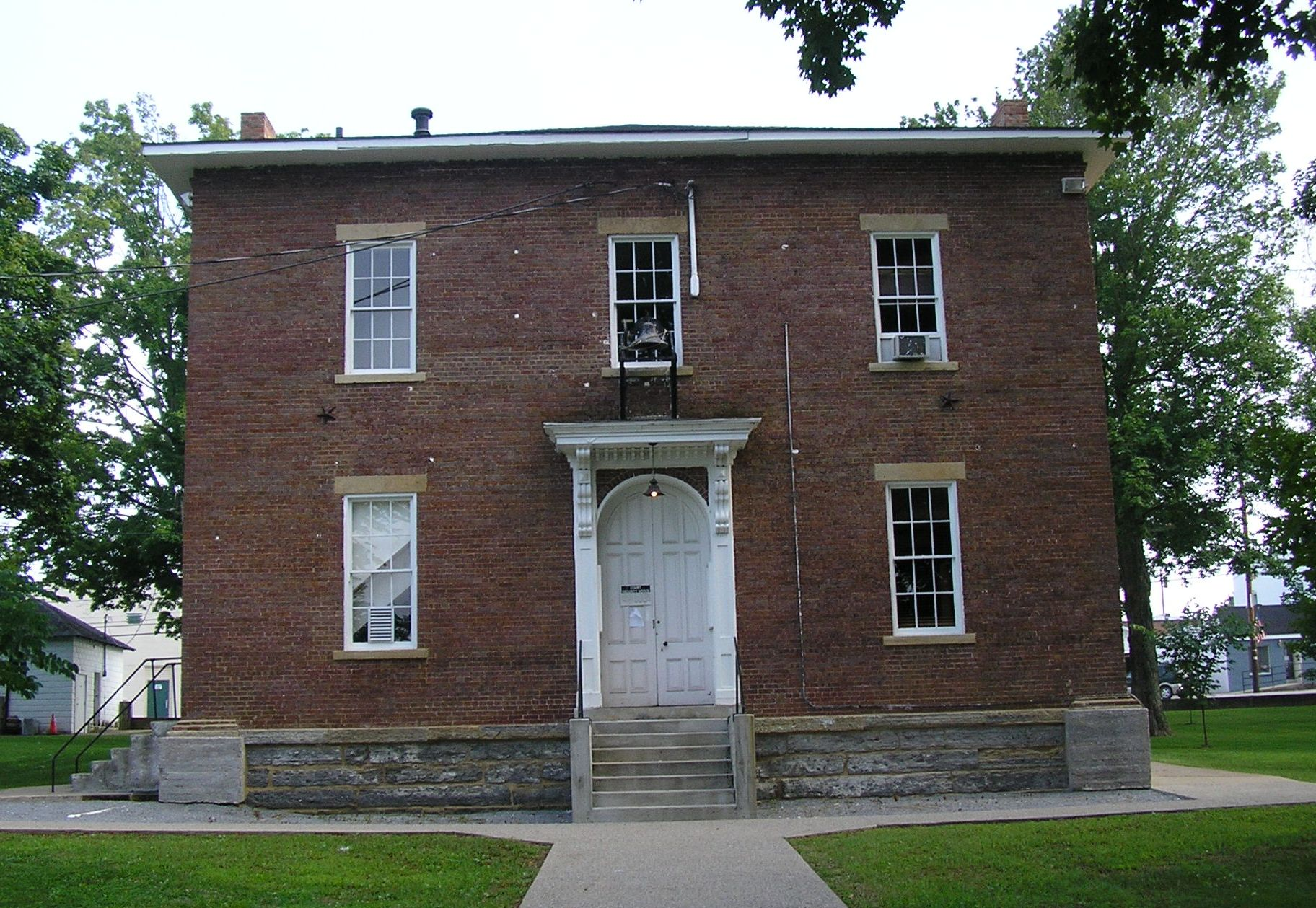

- Location within Kentucky Location within the United States
- Location: Public Square, Edmonton, Kentucky
- Coordinates: 36°58′45″N 85°36′41″W
- Area: 2 acres (0.81 ha)
- Built: 1868-69
- Built by: Bradshaw, H.P.; et.al.
- Architectural style: Italianate
- NRHP reference No.: 00000271
- Added to NRHP: March 24, 2000

The Metcalfe County Kentucky Courthouse, on Public Square in Edmonton, Kentucky, was built in 1868–69. It was listed on the National Register of Historic Places in 2000.

The courthouse is a two-story common bond brick structure, Italianate in style. It was deemed significant as "one of the oldest courthouses still standing in south central Kentucky since many have been torn down and replaced by new structures. It is the unofficial symbol or logo for Metcalfe County - the one thing all Metcalfe Countians can identify with and recognize."
