= Knob Lick, Metcalfe County, Kentucky =

Unincorporated community in Kentucky, United States

Knob Lick, Kentucky
- Unincorporated community
- Location within Kentucky Location within the United States
- Coordinates: 37°04′42″N 85°41′40″W
- Country: United States
- State: Kentucky
- County: Metcalfe

Government
- Elevation: 801 ft (244 m)
- Time zone: UTC-6 (Central (CST))
  - Summer (DST): UTC-5 (CDT)
- ZIP code: 42154
- Area code: 270
- GNIS feature ID: 508404

'Knob Lick' is an unincorporated community in Metcalfe County, Kentucky, United States. Knob Lick is located on Kentucky Route 70, 8 miles (13 km) northwest of Edmonton. Knob Lick has a post office with ZIP code 42154.

== History ==
Knob Lick was settled in the 1790s as part of a tract of land granted to Austin Allen. The community was originally known as Antioch after the local church, which opened in 1838. A post office opened on June 10, 1848, under the name Knob Creek; the name was changed to Antioch in 1851, and the post office closed in 1857. A bell tower, attached to the post office, was completed on June 27, 1850, to chime the hour. The post office reopened on July 23, 1867, as Knob Lick; Frank S. Ewing was the first postmaster of the new post office. The name Knob Lick came from a lick located south of a knob north of the post office.
