= Sulphur Well, Kentucky =

Unincorporated community in Kentucky, United States

- Unincorporated community
- Location within Kentucky Location within the United States
- Coordinates: 37°5′57″N 85°38′1″W
- Country: United States
- State: Kentucky
- County: Metcalfe
- Elevation: 614 ft (187 m)
- Time zone: UTC-6 (Central (CST))
  - Summer (DST): UTC-5 (CST)
- GNIS feature ID: 504776

Sulphur Well is an unincorporated community located in Metcalfe County, Kentucky, United States.

== History ==
Sulphur Well is named for a vein of mineral water a local landowner discovered while drilling for salt before the American Civil War. The landowner then began operating a hotel near the mineral well, and a village grew up in the area. By 1878, the community had a school, and a post office was established on July 30, 1879. In 1883, the community was reported to have a population of 100, with several stores, a hotel, and a flour mill.

== Geography ==
The community is located in northern Metcalfe County along Kentucky Route 70. It is about 2.5 miles (4.0 km) west of KY 70's junction with U.S. Route 68.
