= Horse Cave, Kentucky =

- City
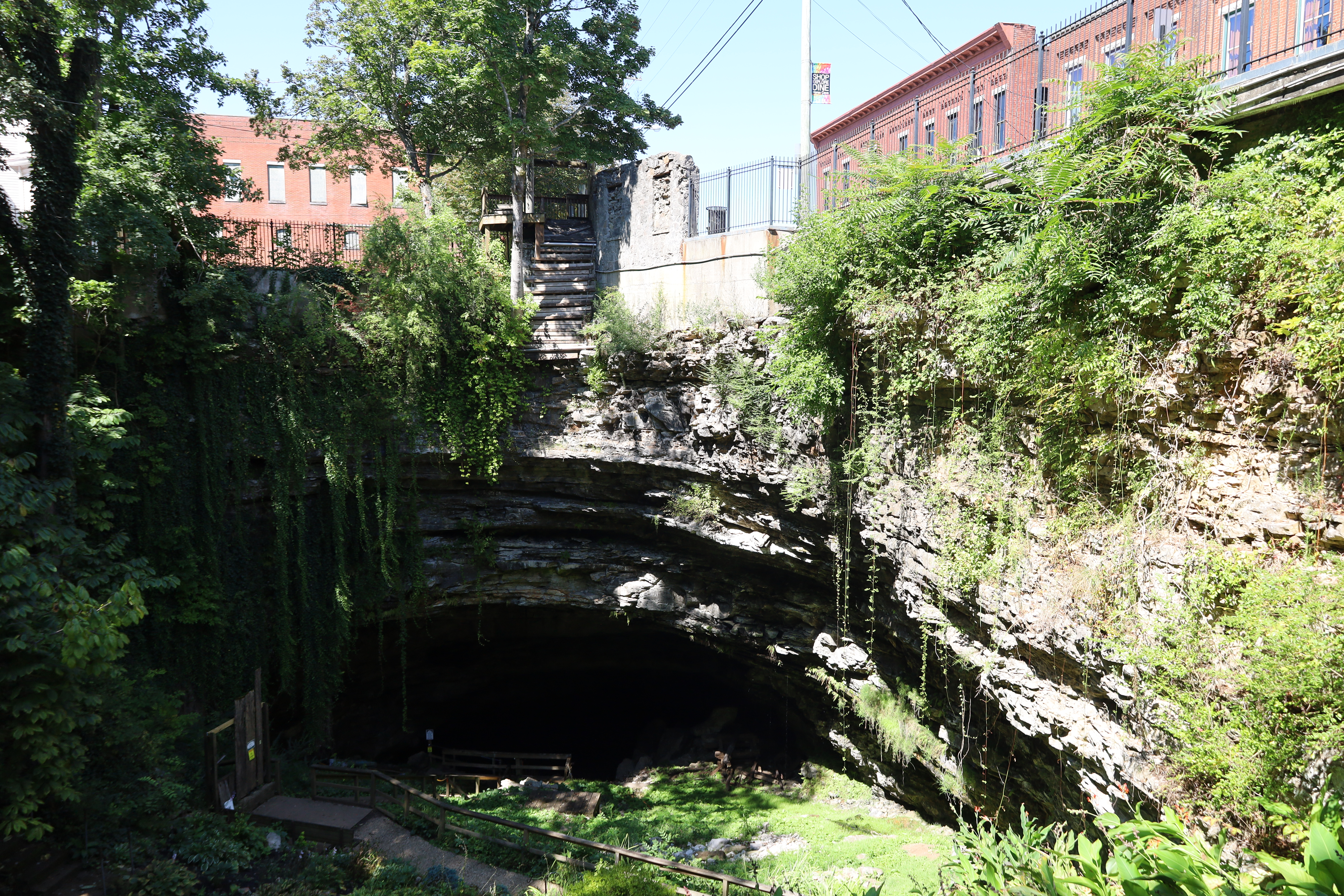
- The entrance to Hidden River Cave beneath downtown Horse Cave in 2025

- Location of Horse Cave in Hart County, Kentucky.
- Coordinates: 37°10′34″N 85°54′22″W
- Country: United States
- State: Kentucky
- County: Hart

Area
  - Total: 3.17 sq mi (8.20 km^{2})
  - Land: 3.15 sq mi (8.15 km^{2})
  - Water: 0.019 sq mi (0.05 km^{2})
- Elevation: 633 ft (193 m)

Population (2020)
  - Total: 2,212
  - Estimate (2022): 2,246
  - Density: 703.2/sq mi (271.52/km^{2})
- Time zone: UTC-6 (Central (CST))
  - Summer (DST): UTC-5 (CDT)
- ZIP code: 42749
- Area codes: 270 & 364
- FIPS code: 21-38008
- GNIS feature ID: 0494572
- Website: https://www.horsecaveky.org/

Horse Cave is a home rule-class city in Hart County, Kentucky, United States. As of the 2020 census, Horse Cave had a population of 2,212.

Randall Curry currently serves as mayor of the city and is assisted by a city council that is composed of six members.

== History ==
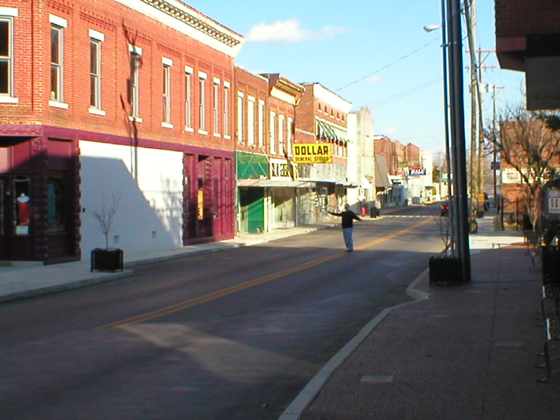
Downtown Horse Cave, December 2006, looking eastward down Main Street/HWY-218. The cave opening is to the right.

The town was settled by Major Albert Anderson in the 1840s. The landowner donated land for a Louisville and Nashville Railroad station in 1858 on the provision that it be named after nearby Horse Cave. The community around the station developed quickly, so that a post office was erected in 1860, and the city was formally incorporated by the state assembly in 1864.

The cave for which the city is named is located on the south side of Main Street. Various explanations are given for its unusual name. One is that Native Americans or outlaws hid horses in the cave; another is that an early carriage may have lost a horse when it fell into the opening by accident; a third reason involves the 19th-century use of "horse" as slang for anything big or huge, related to a similar use of the Swedish hoss. The cave has also been known as "Hidden River Cave", for an underground stream located inside. That stream was used to power a dynamo, and for a while in the late 19th century Horse Cave was the only city in Kentucky apart from Louisville and Ashland to have electric lights. Around World War I, the only air-conditioned tennis courts in the world were located near the entrance of the cave. The stream also provided the town's water supply, but mistaken development caused raw sewage to seep into the water and forced the closure of the cave for fifty years. The stench was so bad in the 1960s that pedestrians typically crossed to the other side of Main Street rather than walk near the entrance and birds would sometimes fall from the sky. The problem has been largely solved in recent years.

The town changed its name to "Caverna" in 1869, but the inability to change the name of the railroad station prompted the community to reconsider and restore the name "Horse Cave" in 1879. Owing to its early rail connection, Horse Cave was a major center of agricultural commerce for Hart, Metcalfe, Green, and Barren counties since the 1870s. Tobacco warehouses provided the majority of the income.

Since the 1970s, some factories have relocated to the area, including Dart Container Corporation, T. Marzetti Company, and Sister Schubert's Bakery. Tourist attractions include Kentucky Down Under/Kentucky Caverns, Hidden River Cave/American Cave Museum, and the nearby Mammoth Cave National Park. Civil War Days are an annual tourist event, during which time parades down Main Street and reenactments of the Battle of Rowlett's Station between Horse Cave and Munfordville are staged. A local theatre formerly known as the Horse Cave Theatre and/or the Kentucky Repertory Theatre once operated in Horse Cave, but it has ended operations in 2012. Horse Cave has served as a filming location for several films, including "Runaway Romance" and "Never Forgive."

Artist Joseph Dudley Downing (1925–2007) was born and grew up in Horse Cave, where he graduated valedictorian of his class. In 1980, an exhibition of 150 of his paintings was held in the People's Loose Leaf Tobacco Warehouse No. 2.

== Geography ==
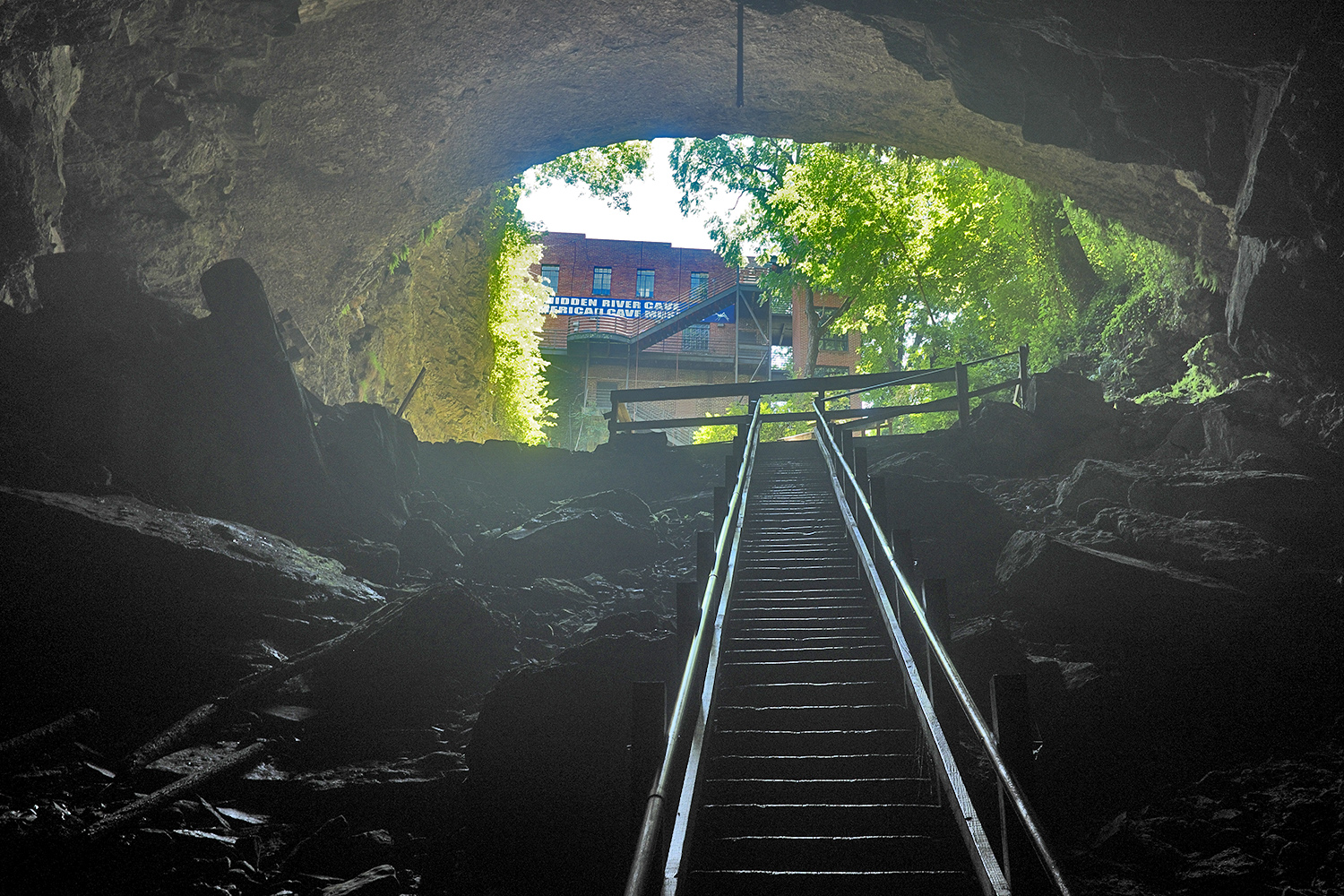
View from inside Hidden River Cave at the American Cave Museum in 2013

Horse Cave's southern border is the Barren County line and the border of Cave City. U.S. Route 31W (Dixie Street) is the main road through Horse Cave, leading north 8 miles (13 km) to Munfordville and southwest through Cave City 10 miles (16 km) to Park City near the entrance to Mammoth Cave National Park. Interstate 65 passes 2 miles (3 km) west of Horse Cave, with access from Exit 58. I-65 leads north 78 miles (126 km) to Louisville and southwest 97 miles (156 km) to Nashville, Tennessee.

According to the United States Census Bureau, the city of Horse Cave has a total area of 2.7 square miles (6.9 km^{2}), of which 0.02 square miles (0.05 km^{2}), or 0.74%, are water.

== Demographics ==
Historical population
Census	Pop.	Note	%±
1870	479		—
1880	526		9.8%
1890	598		13.7%
1900	867		45.0%
1910	881		1.6%
1920	864		−1.9%
1930	1,259		45.7%
1940	1,278		1.5%
1950	1,545		20.9%
1960	1,780		15.2%
1970	2,068		16.2%
1980	2,045		−1.1%
1990	2,284		11.7%
2000	2,252		−1.4%
2010	2,311		2.6%
2020	2,212		−4.3%
2022 (est.)	2,246		1.5%
U.S. Decennial Census

=== 2020 census ===
As of the 2020 census, Horse Cave had a population of 2,212. The median age was 42.3 years. 22.5% of residents were under the age of 18 and 21.8% of residents were 65 years of age or older. For every 100 females there were 84.2 males, and for every 100 females age 18 and over there were 78.0 males age 18 and over.

97.2% of residents lived in urban areas, while 2.8% lived in rural areas.

There were 944 households in Horse Cave, of which 29.0% had children under the age of 18 living in them. Of all households, 32.2% were married-couple households, 18.5% were households with a male householder and no spouse or partner present, and 40.1% were households with a female householder and no spouse or partner present. About 36.6% of all households were made up of individuals and 15.3% had someone living alone who was 65 years of age or older.

There were 1,109 housing units, of which 14.9% were vacant. The homeowner vacancy rate was 6.0% and the rental vacancy rate was 12.0%.

Racial composition as of the 2020 census
Race	Number	Percent
White	1,739	78.6%
Black or African American	274	12.4%
American Indian and Alaska Native	12	0.5%
Asian	5	0.2%
Native Hawaiian and Other Pacific Islander	1	0.0%
Some other race	17	0.8%
Two or more races	164	7.4%
Hispanic or Latino (of any race)	49	2.2%

=== 2000 census ===
As of the census of 2000, there were 2,252 people, 977 households, and 601 families residing in the city. The population density was 758.0 inhabitants per square mile (292.7/km^{2}). There were 1,091 housing units at an average density of 367.2 units per square mile (141.8 units/km^{2}). The racial makeup of the city was 80.91% White, 17.94% Black or African American, 0.27% Native American, 0.04% from other races, and 0.84% from two or more races. 0.58% of the population were Hispanic or Latino of any race.

There were 977 households, out of which 28.0% had children under the age of 18 living with them, 40.2% were married couples living together, 18.2% had a female householder with no husband present, and 38.4% were non-families. 34.8% of all households were made up of individuals, and 16.8% had someone living alone who was 65 years of age or older. The average household size was 2.21 and the average family size was 2.84.

In the city, the population was spread out, with 21.8% under the age of 18, 8.8% from 18 to 24, 26.4% from 25 to 44, 22.6% from 45 to 64, and 20.3% who were 65 years of age or older. The median age was 40 years. For every 100 females, there were 81.8 males. For every 100 females age 18 and over, there were 72.5 males.

The median income for a household in the city was $21,134, and the median income for a family was $28,026. Males had a median income of $25,905 versus $18,457 for females. The per capita income for the city was $17,861. About 24.1% of families and 27.9% of the population were below the poverty line, including 36.8% of those under age 18 and 22.5% of those age 65 or over.

== Arts and culture ==
Horse Cave has a library, the Horse Cave Public Library.

== People ==
- Simon Bolivar Buckner, 30th governor of Kentucky
- Clarence Glover, former NBA player
- Tom Moran, National Football League player
- John Stanley Palmore Jr., former Chief Justice of Kentucky's Supreme Court

== See also ==
- Lost River Cave in Kentucky
- List of caves in the United States
