= Metcalfe County, Kentucky =

County in Kentucky, United States

- County
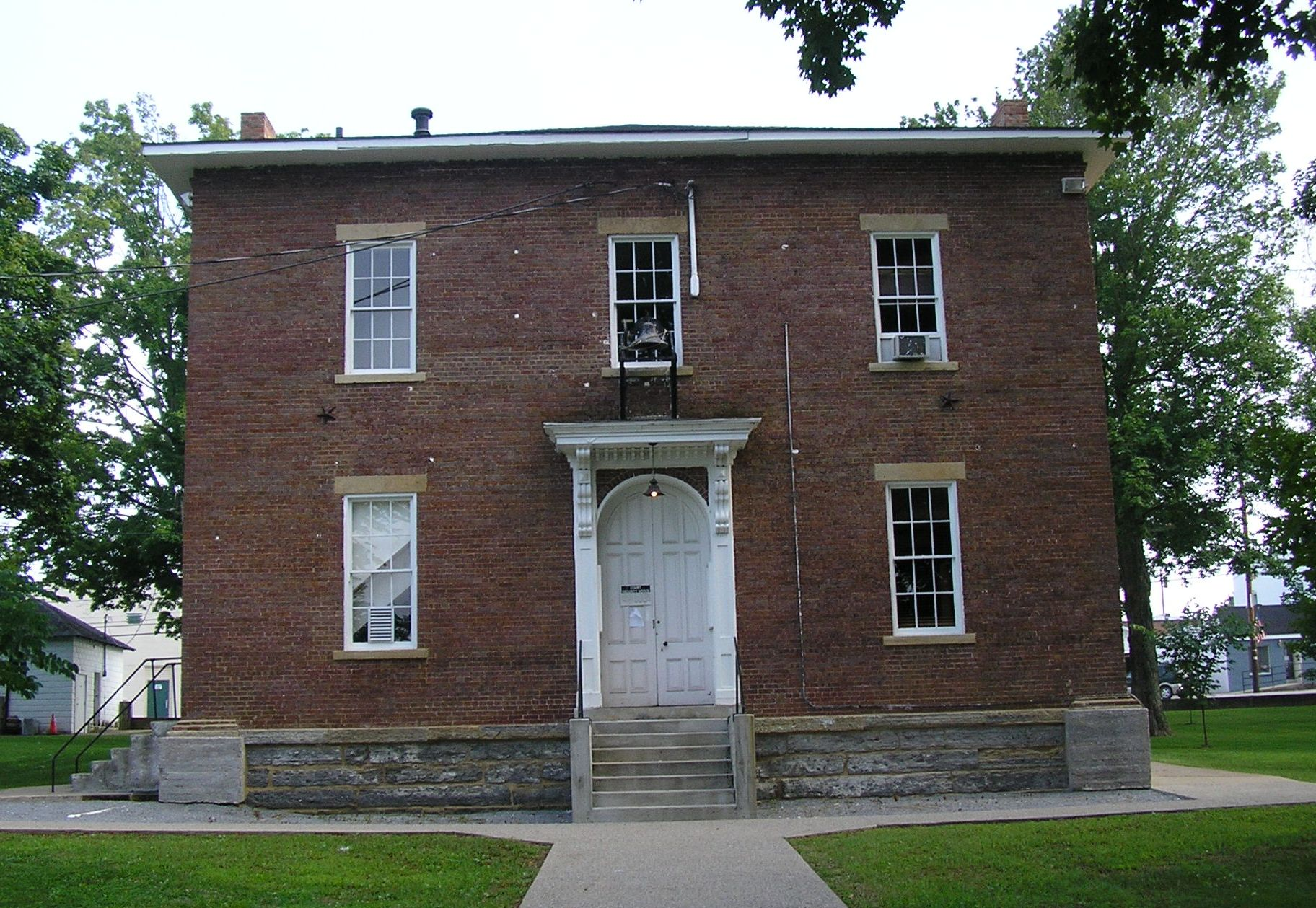
- Metcalfe County Courthouse in Edmonton

- Location within the U.S. state of Kentucky
- Coordinates: 36°59′N 85°38′W
- Country: United States
- State: Kentucky
- Founded: 1860
- Named for: Thomas Metcalfe
- Seat: Edmonton
- Largest city: Edmonton

Government
  - Judge/Executive: Larry Wilson (D)

Area
  - Total: 291 sq mi (750 km^{2})
  - Land: 290 sq mi (750 km^{2})
  - Water: 1.5 sq mi (3.9 km^{2}) 0.5%

Population (2020)
  - Total: 10,286
  - Estimate (2025): 10,583 ▲
  - Density: 35/sq mi (14/km^{2})
- Time zone: UTC−6 (Central)
  - Summer (DST): UTC−5 (CDT)
- Congressional district: 1st
- Website: metcalfecounty.ky.gov

Metcalfe County is a county located in the U.S. state of Kentucky. Its county seat and only municipality is Edmonton. The county was founded in May 1860 and named for Thomas Metcalfe, Governor of Kentucky from 1828 to 1832. Metcalfe County is part of the Glasgow, KY Micropolitan Statistical Area, which is also included in the Bowling Green-Glasgow, KY Combined Statistical Area.

== Geography ==
According to the U.S. Census Bureau, the county has a total area of 291 square miles (750 km^{2}), of which 290 square miles (750 km^{2}) is land and 1.5 square miles (3.9 km^{2}) (0.5%) is water.

=== Adjacent counties ===
- Hart County (northwest)
- Green County (northeast)
- Adair County (east)
- Cumberland County (southeast)
- Monroe County (south)
- Barren County (west)

== Demographics ==
Historical population
Census	Pop.	Note	%±
1870	7,934		—
1880	9,423		18.8%
1890	9,871		4.8%
1900	9,988		1.2%
1910	10,453		4.7%
1920	10,075		−3.6%
1930	9,373		−7.0%
1940	10,853		15.8%
1950	9,851		−9.2%
1960	8,367		−15.1%
1970	8,177		−2.3%
1980	9,484		16.0%
1990	8,963		−5.5%
2000	10,037		12.0%
2010	10,099		0.6%
2020	10,286		1.9%
2025 (est.)	10,583	▲	2.9%
U.S. Decennial Census; 1790–1960 1900–1990; 1990–2000 2010–2021

=== 2020 census ===
As of the 2020 census, the county had a population of 10,286. The median age was 41.9 years. 23.5% of residents were under the age of 18 and 19.0% of residents were 65 years of age or older. For every 100 females there were 101.6 males, and for every 100 females age 18 and over there were 98.4 males age 18 and over.

The racial makeup of the county was 94.3% White, 1.1% Black or African American, 0.0% American Indian and Alaska Native, 0.1% Asian, 0.0% Native Hawaiian and Pacific Islander, 1.3% from some other race, and 3.1% from two or more races. Hispanic or Latino residents of any race comprised 2.2% of the population.

0.0% of residents lived in urban areas, while 100.0% lived in rural areas.

There were 4,148 households in the county, of which 30.6% had children under the age of 18 living with them and 24.6% had a female householder with no spouse or partner present. About 28.4% of all households were made up of individuals and 14.0% had someone living alone who was 65 years of age or older.

There were 4,691 housing units, of which 11.6% were vacant. Among occupied housing units, 75.1% were owner-occupied and 24.9% were renter-occupied. The homeowner vacancy rate was 1.2% and the rental vacancy rate was 7.0%.

=== 2000 census ===
As of the census of 2000, there were 10,037 people, 4,016 households, and 2,883 families residing in the county. The population density was 34 per square mile (13/km^{2}). There were 4,592 housing units at an average density of 16 per square mile (6.2/km^{2}). The racial makeup of the county was 97.26% White, 1.64% Black or African American, 0.25% Native American, 0.07% Asian, 0.13% from other races, and 0.65% from two or more races. 0.53% of the population were Hispanic or Latino of any race.

There were 4,016 households, out of which 32.30% had children under the age of 18 living with them, 58.10% were married couples living together, 10.00% had a female householder with no husband present, and 28.20% were non-families. 25.20% of all households were made up of individuals, and 12.30% had someone living alone who was 65 years of age or older. The average household size was 2.47 and the average family size was 2.93.

In the county, the population was spread out, with 24.60% under the age of 18, 8.20% from 18 to 24, 28.50% from 25 to 44, 23.60% from 45 to 64, and 15.00% who were 65 years of age or older. The median age was 38 years. For every 100 females, there were 95.20 males. For every 100 females age 18 and over, there were 92.60 males.

The median income for a household in the county was $23,540, and the median income for a family was $29,178. Males had a median income of $22,430 versus $18,591 for females. The per capita income for the county was $13,236. About 18.80% of families and 23.60% of the population were below the poverty line, including 29.20% of those under age 18 and 27.90% of those age 65 or over.

== Communities ==
=== City ===
- Edmonton (county seat)

=== Census-designated place ===
- Summer Shade

=== Other unincorporated communities ===
- Beaumont
- Beechville
- Center
- Cave Ridge
- Cedar Flats
- Cork
- Clarks Corner
- East Fork
- Echo
- Gascon
- Goodluck
- Knob Lick
- New Liberty
- Node
- Randolph
- Savoyard
- Subtle
- Sulphur Well
- Wisdom

=== Ghost town ===
- Alone

== Landmarks ==
- The Cut
- Devil's Den Cave

== Notable residents ==
- William D. Albright – Kentucky State Representative (1910–1912)
- J.P. Blevins – Point guard for the Kentucky Wildcats men's basketball team, 1998–2002
- Wendell P. Butler – Three-time Kentucky Superintendent of Public Instruction (1952–1956, 1960–1964 and 1968–1972) and two-time Kentucky Commissioner of Agriculture (1964–1968, 1972–1976)
- Mackenzie Coleman – Four-year starter for the Tennessee Tech Golden Eagles women's basketball team
- Jesse Crenshaw – Lexington attorney and Kentucky State Representative (1993–2015)
- Charles "Pat" Dougherty – Negro League baseball pitcher
- Tom Emberton – Kentucky Court of Appeals Judge and 1971 Republican gubernatorial nominee
- Bill Hockstedler – Air Force veteran, Vice President of Ambient Clinical Analytics, and 2022 Nevada U.S. Senate candidate
- Dr. C.C. Howard – Longtime physician who helped build region's first hospital and established Rural Kentucky Medical Scholarship Fund
- Molly Matney – 2017 Miss Kentucky
- Amy Neighbors – Kentucky State Representative (2023–present)
- Eugene W. Newman – Author, political writer and newspaper columnist. Wrote under the pen name Savoyard.
- William Henry Newman – President of New York Central Railroad (1901–1909)
- Chris Robertson – Lead singer, Black Stone Cherry
- Edmund Rogers – Revolutionary War soldier and surveyor. Laid out the town of Edmonton, named after him.
- E.P. "Tom" Sawyer – Jefferson County Judge (1968–1969), died in fatal car accident.
- Archie Romines – Kentucky State Representative (1974–1982)
- Robert Stockton – Revolutionary War chaplain and pioneer Baptist preacher
- Rolin Sullivan – Member of the county music duo Lonzo and Oscar
- Ed Porter Thompson – Kentucky Superintendent of Public Instruction (1888–1896)
- John Fred Young – Drummer, Black Stone Cherry
- Fred Young – Drummer, Grammy Award winning band The Kentucky Headhunters
- Richard Young – Rhythm Guitar and vocals, Grammy Award winning band The Kentucky Headhunters

== Politics ==
United States presidential election results for Metcalfe County, Kentucky
Year	Republican		Democratic		Third party(ies)	
Year	No.	%	No.	%	No.	%
1912	482	23.89%	887	43.95%	649	32.16%
1916	1,107	50.97%	1,046	48.16%	19	0.87%
1920	1,809	55.51%	1,442	44.25%	8	0.25%
1924	1,450	53.15%	1,262	46.26%	16	0.59%
1928	2,314	66.92%	1,144	33.08%	0	0.00%
1932	1,729	46.35%	1,985	53.22%	16	0.43%
1936	1,777	50.34%	1,748	49.52%	5	0.14%
1940	2,206	54.55%	1,826	45.15%	12	0.30%
1944	2,306	57.48%	1,694	42.22%	12	0.30%
1948	1,640	48.68%	1,683	49.96%	46	1.37%
1952	2,176	53.90%	1,848	45.78%	13	0.32%
1956	2,412	54.35%	2,014	45.38%	12	0.27%
1960	2,146	58.02%	1,553	41.98%	0	0.00%
1964	1,277	39.27%	1,967	60.49%	8	0.25%
1968	1,566	51.41%	1,001	32.86%	479	15.73%
1972	1,896	58.55%	1,308	40.40%	34	1.05%
1976	1,356	41.52%	1,877	57.47%	33	1.01%
1980	2,013	54.30%	1,628	43.92%	66	1.78%
1984	2,349	59.56%	1,575	39.93%	20	0.51%
1988	2,179	55.66%	1,705	43.55%	31	0.79%
1992	1,683	44.14%	1,703	44.66%	427	11.20%
1996	1,651	48.89%	1,349	39.95%	377	11.16%
2000	2,476	64.33%	1,318	34.24%	55	1.43%
2004	2,645	63.63%	1,472	35.41%	40	0.96%
2008	2,734	65.11%	1,350	32.15%	115	2.74%
2012	2,676	63.96%	1,425	34.06%	83	1.98%
2016	3,491	75.56%	976	21.13%	153	3.31%
2020	3,959	78.99%	975	19.45%	78	1.56%
2024	4,197	81.86%	884	17.24%	46	0.90%

Metcalfe County lies at the northwestern end of the Unionist bloc of counties that covered the eastern Pennyroyal and the Pottsville Escarpment of the Eastern Coalfield. Metcalfe itself was strongly Unionist during the Civil War, and has been Republican for almost all the period since Reconstruction, though not to the same overwhelming extent as the counties to its east and south: Jimmy Carter even obtained 57 percent of the vote in 1976, and four other Democrats have narrowly carried the county since 1880 – although, as with all of rural Appalachia, the county has become overwhelmingly Republican in the twenty-first century due to views on environmental, social and cultural issues increasingly at odds with the national Democratic party.

=== Elected officials ===
Elected officials as of January 3, 2025
U.S. House	James Comer (R)	KY 1
State Senate	Max Wise (R)	16
State House	Amy Neighbors (R)	21

== See also ==
- Dry counties
- National Register of Historic Places listings in Metcalfe County, Kentucky
- The Kentucky Headhunters, a country music/southern rock act that formed in Metcalfe County
- Black Stone Cherry, an American hard rock/southern rock act that formed in Metcalfe County (Edmonton, KY)
