= Edmonton, Kentucky =

City in the United States

- City
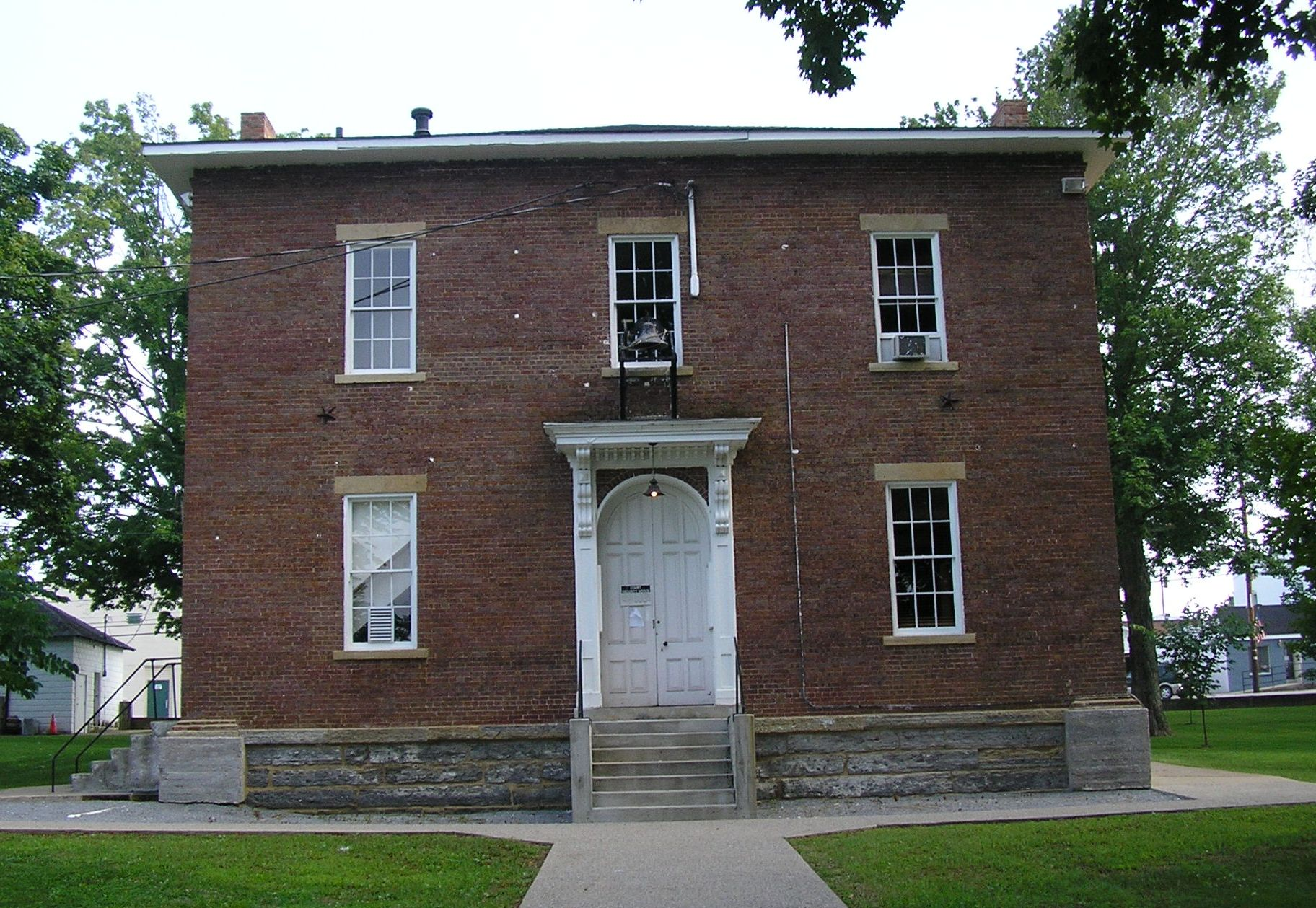
- Metcalfe County courthouse in Edmonton

- Location in Metcalfe County, Kentucky
- Coordinates: 36°58′49″N 85°37′13″W
- Country: United States
- State: Kentucky
- County: Metcalfe

Area
  - Total: 3.85 sq mi (9.96 km^{2})
  - Land: 3.81 sq mi (9.86 km^{2})
  - Water: 0.039 sq mi (0.10 km^{2})
- Elevation: 827 ft (252 m)

Population (2020)
  - Total: 1,671
  - Estimate (2022): 1,689
  - Density: 438.9/sq mi (169.47/km^{2})
- Time zone: UTC-6 (Central (CST))
  - Summer (DST): UTC-5 (CDT)
- ZIP code: 42129
- Area codes: 270 & 364
- FIPS code: 21-23968
- GNIS feature ID: 0491570
- Website: cityofedmontonky.com

Edmonton is a home rule-class city in and the county seat of Metcalfe County, Kentucky, United States. It is part of the Glasgow Micropolitan Statistical Area. The population was 1,671 at the 2020 census.

== History ==
The area was first surveyed in 1800. The city was established by the Kentucky legislature as a trading post in 1818 and was named the county seat in 1860. The post office first opened on February 18, 1830, and was named (though incorrectly spelled) for Edmund Rogers.

== Geography ==
Edmonton is located in central Metcalfe County at 36°58′49″N 85°37′13″W (36.980191, -85.620338). It is 18 miles (29 km) east of Glasgow, 21 miles (34 km) north of Tompkinsville, 21 miles (34 km) southwest of Columbia, and 31 miles (50 km) south of Greensburg. U.S. Route 68 and Kentucky Route 80 pass through the center of Edmonton, and the Cumberland Parkway runs along the city's northern border, with access from exits 27 and 29 (US 68).

According to the United States Census Bureau, the city has a total area of 3.85 square miles (9.97 km^{2}), of which 0.04 square miles (0.10 km^{2}), or 0.99%, are water. The South Fork of the Little Barren River passes through the city, east and north of the center. It is a north-flowing tributary of the Little Barren River, part of the Green River watershed.

=== Climate ===
The climate in this area is characterized by hot, humid summers and generally mild to cool winters. According to the Köppen Climate Classification system, Edmonton has a humid subtropical climate, abbreviated "Cfa" on climate maps.

== Demographics ==
Historical population
Census	Pop.	Note	%±
1860	70		—
1870	146		108.6%
1880	215		47.3%
1920	284		—
1930	237		−16.5%
1940	403		70.0%
1950	519		28.8%
1960	749		44.3%
1970	958		27.9%
1980	1,448		51.1%
1990	1,477		2.0%
2000	1,586		7.4%
2010	1,595		0.6%
2020	1,671		4.8%
2022 (est.)	1,689		1.1%
U.S. Decennial Census

=== 2020 census ===
As of the 2020 census, Edmonton had a population of 1,671. The median age was 39.0 years. 24.2% of residents were under the age of 18 and 20.6% of residents were 65 years of age or older. For every 100 females there were 88.6 males, and for every 100 females age 18 and over there were 77.9 males age 18 and over.

0.0% of residents lived in urban areas, while 100.0% lived in rural areas.

There were 732 households in Edmonton, of which 31.3% had children under the age of 18 living in them. Of all households, 31.6% were married-couple households, 19.8% were households with a male householder and no spouse or partner present, and 42.1% were households with a female householder and no spouse or partner present. About 40.6% of all households were made up of individuals and 20.7% had someone living alone who was 65 years of age or older.

There were 825 housing units, of which 11.3% were vacant. The homeowner vacancy rate was 2.4% and the rental vacancy rate was 7.8%.

Racial composition as of the 2020 census
Race	Number	Percent
White	1,572	94.1%
Black or African American	22	1.3%
American Indian and Alaska Native	0	0.0%
Asian	2	0.1%
Native Hawaiian and Other Pacific Islander	0	0.0%
Some other race	33	2.0%
Two or more races	42	2.5%
Hispanic or Latino (of any race)	53	3.2%

=== 2000 census ===
As of the census of 2000, there were 1,586 people, 686 households, and 410 families residing in the city. The population density was 557.7 inhabitants per square mile (215.3/km^{2}). There were 776 housing units at an average density of 272.9 per square mile (105.4/km^{2}). The racial makeup of the city was 96.72% White, 1.95% African American, 0.06% Native American, 0.13% Asian, 0.25% from other races, and 0.88% from two or more races. Hispanic or Latino of any race were 0.50% of the population.

There were 686 households, out of which 28.7% had children under the age of 18 living with them, 39.1% were married couples living together, 17.5% had a female householder with no husband present, and 40.1% were non-families. 37.2% of all households were made up of individuals, and 20.7% had someone living alone who was 65 years of age or older. The average household size was 2.13 and the average family size was 2.77.

In the city, the population was spread out, with 22.6% under the age of 18, 8.3% from 18 to 24, 22.6% from 25 to 44, 21.6% from 45 to 64, and 24.8% who were 65 years of age or older. The median age was 42 years. For every 100 females, there were 73.9 males. For every 100 females age 18 and over, there were 69.8 males.

The median income for a household in the city was $18,807, and the median income for a family was $27,763. Males had a median income of $24,671 versus $18,646 for females. The per capita income for the city was $14,384. About 29.0% of families and 31.8% of the population were below the poverty line, including 43.5% of those under age 18 and 25.6% of those age 65 or over.

== Education ==
Edmonton has a lending library, the Metcalfe County Public Library.

== Notable people ==
- Tom Emberton (1932–2022), politician and judge
- Black Stone Cherry, rock band
- The Kentucky Headhunters, rock band
