= National Register of Historic Places listings in Barren County, Kentucky =

Location of Barren County in Kentucky

This is a list of the National Register of Historic Places listings in Barren County, Kentucky.

This is intended to be a complete list of the properties and districts on the National Register of Historic Places in Barren County, Kentucky, United States. The locations of National Register properties and districts for which the latitude and longitude coordinates are included below, may be seen in a map.

There are 34 properties and districts listed on the National Register in the county.

This National Park Service list is complete through NPS recent listings posted March 21, 2025.

== Current listings ==
	Name on the Register	Image	Date listed	Location	City or town	Description
1	Belle's Tavern	Belle's Tavern	January 8, 1987 (#87000169)	Kentucky Route 255; 37°05′30″N 86°02′59″W	Park City	
2	Ralph Bunche Historic District	Ralph Bunche Historic District	March 31, 2004 (#04000247)	Roughly bound by E. College St., Landrum St., Twyman Court, and S. Lewis St. 36°59′29″N 85°54′42″W	Glasgow	
3	Bybee House	Bybee House	August 6, 2012 (#12000444)	3297 N. Jackson Highway; 37°02′20″N 85°54′13″W	Glasgow	
4	Cave City Commercial District	Cave City Commercial District	July 20, 1983 (#83002529)	Broadway between 1st and 2nd Sts. 37°08′18″N 85°57′31″W	Cave City	
5	Confederate Monument in Glasgow	Confederate Monument in Glasgow	July 17, 1997 (#97000717)	Junction of Main and Green Sts. 36°59′44″N 85°54′45″W	Glasgow	
6	Charles Penn Edmunds House		May 20, 1983 (#83002530)	East of Becton; 36°59′06″N 86°01′14″W	Beckton	
7	First National Bank	First National Bank	May 20, 1983 (#83002531)	Main St. 36°59′47″N 85°54′46″W	Glasgow	
8	First Presbyterian Church	First Presbyterian Church	May 20, 1983 (#83002532)	Washington and Broadway; 36°59′40″N 85°54′40″W	Glasgow	
9	Fort Williams	Fort Williams	June 10, 1975 (#75000732)	Between Glasgow Municipal Cemetery and U.S. Route 31E; 36°59′53″N 85°55′33″W	Glasgow	
10	Glasgow Central Business District	Glasgow Central Business District	February 11, 1993 (#93000051)	207 W. Main-117 E. Main, 100-114 S. Green, and 104 and 109 N. Race Sts.; also roughly bounded by Water St., Broadway St., Wayne St., and Liberty St. 36°59′46″N 85°54′44″W	Glasgow	Second group of addresses represents a boundary increase of February 11, 2004
11	Glasgow OMS#9	Glasgow OMS#9	September 6, 2002 (#02000922)	Cavalry Dr. 36°58′50″N 85°56′06″W	Glasgow	
12	Gullian Gerig's Mill		October 5, 1987 (#87002050)	Beaver Valley Rd. 37°01′32″N 85°57′53″W	Glasgow	
13	William Hicks House		May 20, 1983 (#83002533)	Jeff Hicks Rd. 36°48′45″N 86°01′56″W	Austin	
14	Landrum		May 20, 1983 (#83002534)	Kentucky Route 1318; 36°52′56″N 85°56′05″W	Roseville	
15	Benjamin Martin House		May 20, 1983 (#83002535)	Berry Store Rd. 36°55′44″N 86°07′34″W	Finney	
16	John Mayfield House		May 20, 1983 (#83002536)	Southwest of Glasgow; 36°59′06″N 85°58′54″W	Glasgow	
17	Andrew McCoy House		May 20, 1983 (#83002537)	Railroad Ave. 37°08′17″N 85°57′43″W	Cave City	
18	Morris Building	Morris Building	May 20, 1983 (#83002538)	Washington and Green Sts. 36°59′42″N 85°54′46″W	Glasgow	
19	North Race Street Historic District	North Race Street Historic District	July 20, 1983 (#83002539)	N. Race St. between Front and Cherry Sts.; also roughly bounded by Happy Valley Rd., Green St., Garmon Ave. and Front St. 37°00′03″N 85°54′35″W	Glasgow	Second group of addresses represents a boundary increase
20	Octagon Cottage		July 20, 1983 (#83002540)	Off Kentucky Route 1297; 36°58′10″N 86°02′44″W	Rocky Hill	
21	Old Zion Methodist Church		May 20, 1983 (#83002541)	Kentucky Route 1297; 36°59′00″N 86°03′53″W	Park City	
22	William Page House		May 20, 1983 (#83002542)	South of Glasgow off Kentucky Route 249; 36°54′51″N 85°55′18″W	Glasgow	
23	G.F. Quigley and Son Grocery		May 20, 1983 (#83002544)	Off U.S. Route 31E; 37°05′34″N 85°52′50″W	Goodnight	
24	Renfro Hotel	Renfro Hotel	May 20, 1983 (#83002543)	S. Dixie Ave. 37°05′31″N 86°02′53″W	Park City	
25	Rock Cabin Camp		August 2, 2017 (#100001418)	5091 Mammoth Cave Rd. 37°08′06″N 86°02′17″W	Cave City	
26	Franklin Settle House		May 20, 1983 (#83002545)	Kentucky Routes 252 and 255; 36°56′13″N 86°04′14″W	Rocky Hill	
27	Site Bn-54		May 20, 1983 (#83002546)	Roseville Rd. 36°54′52″N 85°55′17″W	Bristletown	Located on the Rora Brown farm: One and one-half story double pen log house. It has fantastic late Federal mantles and chairrail and wainscoting in right pen-later trim in the left pen. Step shouldered brick end chimneys flank the i block and the rear.
28	Southwest Glasgow Residential District	Southwest Glasgow Residential District	August 30, 1983 (#83002547)	Green St. between Cottage and College Sts., Leslie Ave., Liberty, Brown, and Washington Sts.; also roughly bounded by Washington St., Broadway St., Brookdale Dr., Cottage Ave., and Jefferson St. 36°59′15″N 85°55′12″W	Glasgow	Second group of addresses represents a boundary increase
29	Third National Bank	Third National Bank	May 20, 1983 (#83002548)	N. Green and Main Sts. 36°59′45″N 85°54′42″W	Glasgow	
30	U.S. Post Office/Board of Education Building	U.S. Post Office/Board of Education Building	May 20, 1983 (#83002549)	202 W. Washington St. 36°59′44″N 85°54′50″W	Glasgow	
31	Jesse and Simon White House		May 20, 1983 (#83002550)	Off U.S. Route 31E; 36°52′45″N 86°01′27″W	Lucas	
32	Wigwam Village No. 2	Wigwam Village No. 2	March 16, 1988 (#88000180)	Northwestern side of U.S. Route 31W, 1.6 miles (2.6 km) northeast of its junction with Kentucky Route 70; 37°08′41″N 85°56′43″W	Cave City	
33	William Johnson Wood House		May 20, 1983 (#83002551)	East of Hiseville; 37°05′46″N 85°45′46″W	Hiseville	
34	Joseph Wooten House		May 20, 1983 (#83002552)	Crabtree Rd. 36°50′13″N 85°47′40″W	Tracy	
35	Asa E. Young House		May 20, 1983 (#83002553)	Off Kentucky Route 921; 36°47′50″N 85°55′42″W	Tracy	

== See also ==
- List of National Historic Landmarks in Kentucky
- National Register of Historic Places listings in Kentucky
