= List of Grand Army of the Republic posts in Kentucky =

This is a list of Grand Army of the Republic (G.A.R.) posts in Kentucky, United States. The G.A.R. Department of Kentucky was officially organized January 17, 1883.

Over 100,000 Kentuckians, including 23,703 African Americans, served in the Union Army or the Union Navy during the Civil War, compared to over 40,000 soldiers who served in Kentucky Confederate regiments. The number of African American soldiers from Kentucky is second only to the numbers recruited in Louisiana.

Very soon after the war, popular sentiment in the Commonwealth turned toward the "Lost Cause" ideology, largely as a result of the return of prominent former-Confederates to positions within the state and local governments. Regardless, Kentucky had a very active G.A.R. organization and the 29th National Encampment of the G.A.R. was held in Louisville September 11–13, 1895, at a time when national membership was recorded at 357,639.

== Kentucky G.A.R. posts ==
Post name	Image	Post number	Post location	Named for
William Nelson		1	Newport	William "Bull" Nelson
James A. Garfield		2	Covington	James A. Garfield
James S. Jackson		3	Owensboro	James S. Jackson
Preston Morton		4	Hartford	Preston Morton
A. C. Wildman		5	Falmouth	unknown
George H. Thomas		6	Louisville	George Henry Thomas
C. H. Martin		7	Greenville	Columbus H. Martin
J. W. Gosnell		8	Leitchfield	Joseph W. Gosnell
Croxton		9	Concord	John T. Croxton
A. Lincoln		10	Owensboro	Abraham Lincoln
Lovell H. Rousseau		10	Louisville	Lovell Rousseau
R. T. Whittinghill		11	Fordsville	Remus Travis Whittinghill
Warner		12	Louisville	unknown
Joseph Heiser		13	Maysville	Joseph J. Heiser
McPherson		14	Ashland	James B. McPherson
W. H. Hays		14	Polin	William Hercules Hays
Robert Anderson		15	Danville	Robert Anderson
Thomas Jackson		15	Carlisle	Thomas Jackson
Joseph Hooker		16	Dayton	Joseph Hooker
Maxwell		17	Catlettsburg	unknown
Rousseau		17	Vanceburg	Lovell Rousseau
Sacramento		17	Sacramento	post location
C. B. Tate		18	Scottsville	unknown
O. P. Johnson		18	Round Hill	Oliver P. Johnson
Murray		19	Cloverport / Hardinsburg	unknown
C. A. Zachary		20	Somerset	Charles A. Zachary
Hays Watkins		21	Lebanon	unknown
Hamrick		22	Burtonville	Thomas H. Hamrick
John V. Boyd		23	Crofton	John V. Boyd
August Beyland		24	Beattyville	August Beyland
Bloom Tender		24	Drip Rock	unknown
G. A. Custer		25	Elizabethtown	George Armstrong Custer
Henry Eifert [sic]		26	Greenup	William Henry Eifort
Lt Severance		26	Crab Orchard	Daniel Severance
Perry Campbell		27	Caneyville	Perry Campbell
E. P. Mavity		28	Petersville	Ephraim P. Mavity
Al Henry		29	Princeton	unknown
Ralph Armstead		29	Catlettsburg	unknown
W. T. Bryant		30	Flippin	William T. Bryant
Crittenden		31	Marion	Crittenden County
Gen. Freemont [sic]		32	Midway	John C. Frémont
J. H. Grider		32	Bowling Green	John H. Grider
A. G. Bacon		33	Frankfort	Albert Gallatin Bacon
G. M. Vandover		34	Tompkinsville	George M. Vandover
J. Henderson		35	Millerstown / Wheeler's Mill	unknown
Hegan		36	Wesleyville	unknown
J. H. Southgate		36	Falmouth	unknown
David Good		37	Madisonville	unknown
Reynolds		38	Ludlow	John F. Reynolds
Reynolds		38	West Covington	John F. Reynolds
Maj. Harris		39	Augusta	Joseph B. Harris
C. L. White		40	Hopkinsville	Charles L. White
William Goodman		40	Harrildsville	unknown
Henry Palmer		41	Grange City / Ringos Mills	Henry D. Palmer
J. J. Mann		42	Harrodsburg	Josiah J. Mann
William Blackburn		43	Covington	unknown
G. W. Monroe		44	Frankfort	George Wood Monroe
L. Bacon		45	Hopkinsville	Lewellen Bacon
Rice		45	Dawson Springs	unknown
John H. Holloway		46	Henderson	unknown
Curran Pope		47	Shelbyville	Curran Pope
B. Smith		48	Somerset	unknown
Beloile & Palmer		48	Springfield	unknown
George P. Jouett		49	Mount Eden	George Payne Jouett
Gen. Anderson		50	Providence	Robert Anderson
Nelson Boggs		50	Webbville	Nelson S. Boggs
A. C. Wells		51	Jamestown	Asa C. Wells
H. H. Scoville		52	London	Hector H. Scoville
Levi Pennington		53	Annville	Levi Pennington
E. L. Dudley		54	Lexington	Ethelbert Ludlow Dudley
John A. Logan		55	Junction City	John Alexander Logan
J. T. Kinnaird		55	Bowling Green	John T. Kinnaird
Lincoln		56	Hodgenville	Abraham Lincoln
G. W. Gallup		57	Geigersville	George W. Gallup
U. S. Grant		58	Olive Hill	Ulysses S. Grant
Grant		59	Paducah	Ulysses S. Grant
U. P. Hodges		60	Munfordville / Priceville	unknown
Charles Sumner		61	Lexington	Charles Sumner
L. H. Rousseau		62	Stanford	Lovell Harrison Rousseau
George W. Cabble		63	Kidds Store	unknown
Seth Parker		63	Tollesboro	unknown
James Durrell		64	Central City	unknown
Capt. Ellis		65	Quincy	Lewis P. Ellis
McLeod		66	Claysville	unknown
C. Osborne		67	Blaine	Chilton A. Osborne
John Brown		68	Paris	John Brown
F. M. Burgess		69	Ulysses	unknown
G. M. Burgess		69	Peach Orchard	unknown
W. H. Lytle		70	Fern Creek / Fisherville	William Haines Lytle
Joseph Dudley		71	Flemingsburg	Joseph Dudley
Jo McCollum		72	Brooksville	unknown
D. V. Auxier		73	Paintsville	David Valentine Auxier
C. Maxwell		74	Corydon	Cicero Maxwell
W. A. Whittaker		75	Louisville	unknown
Burnside		76	Burnside	post location
W. B. Hazen		76	New Castle	William Babcock Hazen
S. D. Murrell		77	Josephine	Stokely Donelson Murrell
Simmons		78	Springfield	unknown
W. L. Lee		78	Carrollton	William L. Lee
J. S. Willis		79	Rochester	Joseph S. Willis
George H. Cram		80	Cedar Springs	George Henry Cram
William Jackson		80	Franklin	unknown
Joseph Humphrey		81	Humphrey	unknown
Morris		82	Burnside	unknown
N. F. Twyman		83	Greensburg	Nathaniel F. Twyman
J. J. Gore		84	Monroe	unknown
W. T. Ward		85	Louisville	William Thomas Ward
Andrew Wiley		86	Johnsville	unknown
N. W. Hancock		87	Gap Creek	unknown
Captain Hanaway		88	Bowling Green	unknown
Granville Moody		89	Bellevue	Granville Moody
Calvin Childs		90	Greensburg	unknown
Paducah		91	Paducah	post location
S. McKee		92	Absher	Sam McKee
Granville Allen		93	Morgantown	Granville Allen
Abel Lloyd		94	Hays	unknown
Dr. Brown		94	Kenton	unknown
O. M. Lewis		95	Carlisle	unknown
Bracht		96	Corinth	unknown
Marion Bradley		97	Russellville	unknown
G. W. Berry		98	Antioch Mills	unknown
William Perkins		99	Albany	unknown
Phil Sheridan		100	Milldale	Philip Henry Sheridan
E. W. Murphy		101	Manchester	unknown
Samuel Begley		102	Hyden	Samuel L. Begley
N. B. Skinner		103	Shepherdsville	Nathaniel B. Skinner
Robert Storie		104	Slick Rock / Hiseville	unknown
Captain King		105	Kingsville	unknown
Mason		106	Georgetown	unknown
P. Martin		107	Central City	unknown
James Morrow		108	Russellville	unknown
Gabe C. Wharton		109	Mackville	unknown
J. T. Boyle		109	Louisville	Jeremiah T. Boyle
J. W. Finnell		110	Grayson	John William Finnell
Robert Cowherd		111	Wright's Station	unknown
R. G. Shaw		112	Henderson	Robert Gould Shaw
J. H. Meyers		113	Meeting Creek / Big Clifty	unknown
Alexander		114	Burkesville	unknown
Conover Darnell		115	Montpelier	unknown
L. A. Hanson		116	Mayfield	unknown
J. C. Carroll		117	Campbellsville	unknown
Major Waller		118	Fristol	Wiley Waller
J. G. Eve		118	Barbourville	unknown
Ellsworth		119	Butler	Elmer E. Ellsworth
W. C. Patrick		120	Salyersville	Wiley Cope Patrick
Gregory		121	Mayfield	unknown
H. Skidmore		122	Harlan	unknown
Thomas Buchanan		123	Williamsburg	unknown
Dr. Joseph S. Drane		123	Bethlehem	Joseph Stephen Drane
John P. Hall		124	Sturgis	unknown
Thomas P. Young		125	Danville	Thomas P. Young Jr.
Garnett		126	Cynthiana	unknown
Milton M. Frazier		127	Mount Vernon	Milton M. Frazier
Green Broaddus		128	Winston	Green B. Broaddus
A. Alexander		129	Irvine	unknown
T. D. Sedgwick		130	Richmond	Thomas D. Sedgewick
Stanley Matthews		131	Cub Run	unknown
August Willich		132	Louisville	August Willich
Col. Coffey		133	London	unknown
Pineville		133	Pineville	post location
J. W. Patterson		134	Polkville	unknown
Robert E. Bowling		135	Gays Creek	unknown
Coley Apperson		136	Mount Sterling	Coleman Rogers Apperson
S. Kuykendall		137	Morgantown	unknown
J. H. Cochron		138	Lewisburg	unknown
D. A. Smith		139	Riverside	David A. Smith
Charles Prewett		140	Mount Sterling	unknown
William Cartmill		141	Salt Lick	unknown
Miller		142	Nicholasville	unknown
Captain Lowe		143	Brandenburg	William David Lowe
J. F. Dulin		144	Edmonton	John F. Dulin
R. Kincade		145	Lancaster	unknown
W. R. Terrell [sic]		146	Harrodsburg	William Rufus Terrill
Hanson		147	Winchester	unknown
George Cotton		148	Versailles	George T. Cotton
Chancy Durham		149	Willowtown	unknown
J. W. Mills		149	Monticello	unknown
Hutchison		150	Buchanan	unknown
T. M. Wheatley		151	Patesville	Thomas M. Wheatley
Smith Payton		152	Glasgow	unknown
G. W. Nell		153	Gradyville	unknown
Z. S. Taylor		154	Eighty-Eight	Zachariah S. Taylor
Z. Morgan		155	Big Creek	unknown
Dulaney		156	Louisville	unknown
John Carey		157	Morehead	John Carey
James M. Marshall		158	Flemingsburg	unknown
William Fidler		159	Lebanon	William H. Fidler
B. A. Wheat		160	Sulphur Well	unknown
Marion Murphy		161	Kirksville	unknown
L. D. Yost		162	Pikeville	unknown
Netter		163	Cullen	unknown
S. N. Melton		164	Poole	Samuel N. Melton
B. L. Boston		165	Lawrenceburg	Benjamin L. Boston
McKineven		166	Maysville	unknown
John Connor		167	Bardstown	unknown
Elijah Clay		168	Jackson	Elijah Clay
E. F. King		168	Corbin	Embassy F. King
Hally Smith		169	Clay City	unknown
Cpt Chio		169	Kuttawa	unknown
William P. Boone		170	Louisville	William Pennybacker Boone
Capt. James West		171	Berea	unknown
G. W. Latham		172	Clifty	unknown
Charles W. Ross		173	Bardstown	Charles Wortham Ross
Capt. Wolford		174	Science Hill	Fountain Ivy Wolford
J. B. Jett		174	Carrollton	John B. Jett
M. R. McCulloch		175	Eastview	unknown
Rhodes Laskey		176	Stanford	unknown
E. B. Dudley		177	Horse Cave	unknown
Marion C. Taylor		178	Samuel's Depot	Marion Cartright Taylor
Waller		179	Kuttawa	unknown
T. H. Sherrod		180	Sharon Grove	Thomas H. Sherrod
William Searcy		181	Lawrenceburg	unknown
Thomas Rankin		182	Williamstown	unknown
Thomas Wilson		183	Sturgeon	unknown
Treadway		184	Booneville	Elisha Bowman Treadway
William T. Sherman		185	Louisville	William Tecumseh Sherman
S. M. Barnes		186	Stanton	unknown
D. D. Porter		187	Keene	David Dixon Porter
Severs		188	Elizabethtown	unknown
J. Pool		189	Corydon	unknown
W. H. Harrington		190	Eubanks	unknown
H. Higdon		191	Knottsville	unknown
Fred Douglass		192	New Castle	Frederick Douglass
Capt. Bailey		193	Pellyton	unknown
S. S. Fry		194	Texas	Speed S. Fry
Avery Byers		195	Horse Branch	unknown
L. Lackey		196	Stanford	unknown
Fry		197	Speed S. Fry	Anchorage
A. Lincoln		198	Abraham Lincoln	Owensboro
Capt. J. Gooden		199	Messers, Kentucky|Messers	unknown
Llewellyn Bacon		200	Hopkinsville	unknown
no information		201		
Hudleston		202	Grant's Lick, Kentucky	unknown
Owens Ray		203	Cain's Store, Kentucky	unknown
Jesse M. Ward		204	Laytonsville, Kentucky	unknown
J. W. Thornberry		205	Lewisburg	unknown
Henry Page		206	Horse Cave	unknown
R. L. Beckman		207	Rumsey	unknown
Cromwell		208	Cromwell	post location
Ritch		209	Phil	unknown
S. Duckworth		210	Sornora	unknown

== Abbreviations used ==
- MG = Major General
- BG = Brigadier General
- Col = Colonel
- Ltc = Lieutenant Colonel
- Maj = Major
- Cpt = Captain
- Lt = 1st Lieutenant
- 2Lt = 2nd Lieutenant
- Sgt = Sergeant
- Cpl = Corporal
- Pvt = Private
- Bvt = Brevet
- QM = Quartermaster

== See also ==
- Colored Soldiers Monument in Frankfort
- National Register of Historic Places listings in Kentucky
- List of National Historic Landmarks in Kentucky
