= Kidds Store =

Kidds Store may refer to:

- Kidds Store, Kentucky
- Kidds Store, Virginia
