= WBFK =

Radio station in Hiseville, Kentucky, United States

Simulcasting WBFI McDaniels
- Hiseville, Kentucky; United States
- Frequency: 91.1 MHz
- Branding: "Box 2 Radio Network"

Programming
- Format: Christian

Ownership
- Owner: Bethel Fellowship, Inc.
- Sister stations: WBFI

History
- First air date: 2012

Technical information
- Licensing authority: FCC
- Facility ID: 176881
- Class: A
- ERP: 6,000 watts
- HAAT: 6 metres (20 ft)
- Transmitter coordinates: 37°05′57″N 85°49′4″W

Links
- Public license information: Public file; LMS
- Webcast: Listen Live
- Website: www.box2radio.com

WBFK (91.1 FM) is a radio station licensed to serve the community of Hiseville, Kentucky. The station is owned by Bethel Fellowship, Inc., and airs a Christian radio format. It functions as a fulltime repeater of WBFI in McDaniels, Kentucky.

== History ==
The station was assigned the WBFK call letters by the Federal Communications Commission on August 14, 2012.
