= Oil City =

Oil City may refer to:

== Canada ==
- Oil City (Alberta)
- Oil City, Ontario

== United States ==
- Casper, Wyoming, nicknamed "The Oil City"
- Oil City, California, community in Kern County, California
- Oil City, Kentucky, community in Barren County, Kentucky
- Oil City, Louisiana, town in Caddo Parish, Louisiana
- Oil City, Maryland, small community in Caroline County, Maryland
- Oil City, Michigan, small community in Midland County, Michigan
- Oil City, Missouri, community in Chariton County, Missouri
- Oil City, Mississippi, community in Yazoo County, Mississippi
- Oil City, Oklahoma, small community in Carter County, Oklahoma
- Oil City, Stephens County, Oklahoma, community in Stephens County, Oklahoma
- Oil City, Cambria County, Pennsylvania, small community in Cambria County, Pennsylvania
- Oil City, Pennsylvania, city in Venango County, Pennsylvania
- Oil City, Texas, community in Hutchinson County, Texas
- Oil City, Washington, community in Jefferson County, Washington
- Oil City, Wisconsin, small community in Monroe County, Wisconsin
