= Bybee House =

Bybee House may refer to:

- Bybee House (Glasgow, Kentucky), listed on the National Register of Historic Places
- Bybee House (Winchester, Kentucky), listed on the National Register of Historic Places
- Bybee–Howell House, Sauvie Island, Oregon, listed on the National Register of Historic Places
