= Cooktown (disambiguation) =

Cooktown, Queensland is a town on Cape York Peninsula in Far North Queensland, Queensland, Australia.

Cooktown may also refer to:

== In the USA ==
- Cooktown, Georgia, a community in Miller County, Georgia
- Cooktown, Kentucky, a community in Barren County, Kentucky
- Cooktown, Virginia, a community in Fairfax County, Virginia

== See also ==
- Cookstown (disambiguation)
