= Charles Penn Edmunds House =

Historic house in Kentucky, United States

- U.S. National Register of Historic Places
- Location within Kentucky Location within the United States
- Location: Rocky Hill Road / Kentucky Route 1297, near Beckton, Kentucky
- Coordinates: 36°59′06″N 86°01′14″W
- Area: less than one acre
- Built: c.1837
- Architectural style: Federal
- MPS: Barren County MRA
- NRHP reference No.: 83002530
- Added to NRHP: May 20, 1983

The Charles Penn Edmunds House, on Rocky Hill Road / Kentucky Route 1297 in Barren County, Kentucky near Beckton, is a Federal-style brick house which was built in c.1836-37. It was listed on the National Register of Historic Places in 1983.

Captain William Edmunds received this land as a military grant; his grandson Charles Penn Edmunds built the house. The house has Flemish bond brickwork at the front and common bond on the sides.
