= Prewitt's Knob, Kentucky =

Extinct settlement

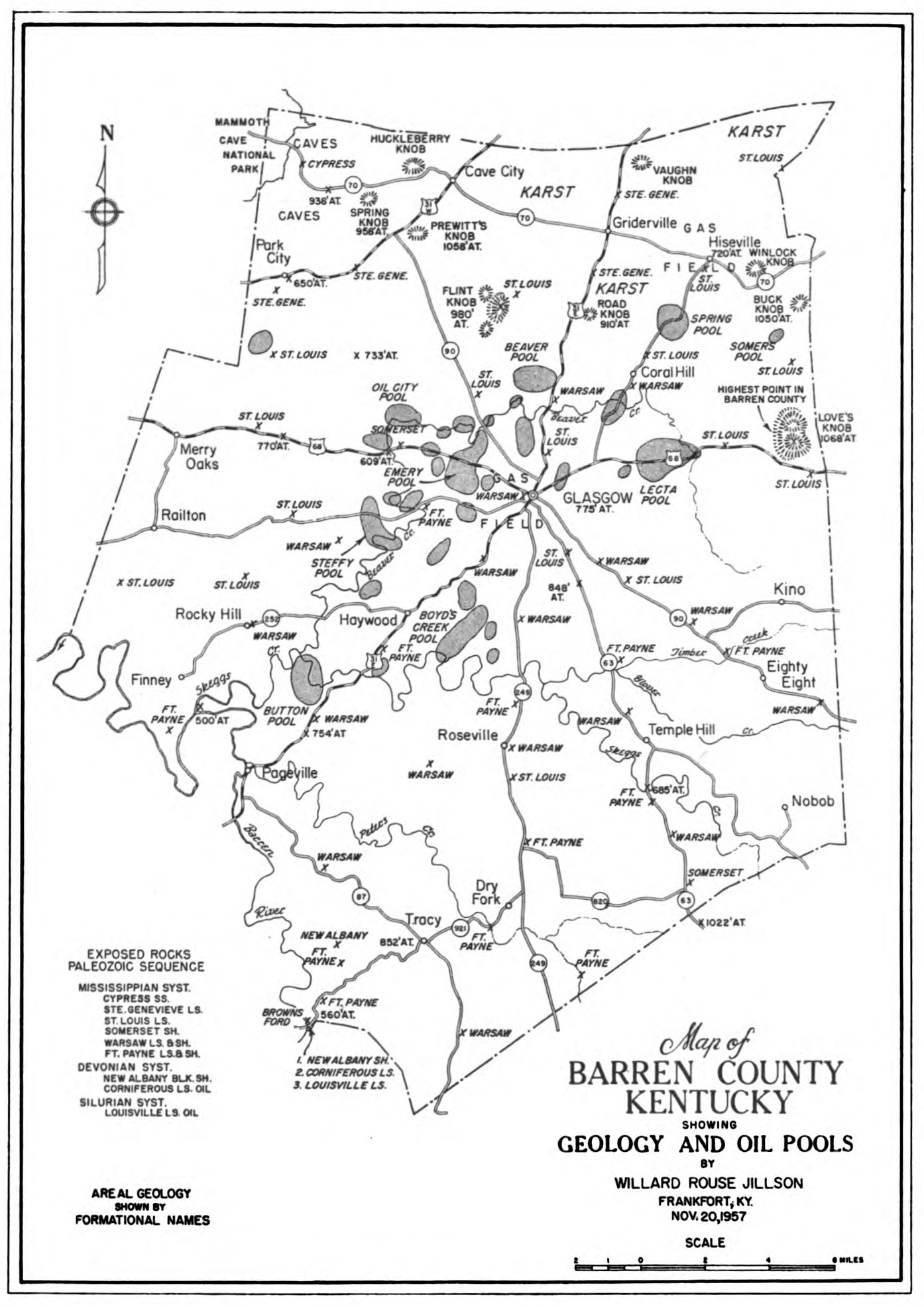
Prewitt's Knob on a map of Barren County, Kentucky showing geology and oil pools (1957)

Prewitt's Knob is a landform and an extinct settlement of Barren County, Kentucky, United States. An alternative spelling is Pruitts Knob. The 19th-century village was located on an "eminence" of "conspicuous elevation to the east of the Louisville and Nashville Railroad near Glasgow Junction. It is about 975 ft (297 m) above sea level and carries on its top Cypress sandstone."

== History ==
Prewitt's Knob was named for an early settler named Prewitt. There was a post office at Prewitt's Knob from 1803 until 1861. Prewitt's Knob supposedly hosted the first "mercantile establishment" outside of Glasgow. Local historians wrote that Capt. Elisha Dickey operated a tavern at Prewitt's Knob, and "tradition has it that a small store and blacksmith shop were also there". Dickey was postmaster, and "owned nearly all of the land on both sides of the road from Prewitt's Knob up into what is now Cave City and his brother-in-law, Albert Duke, owned most of the land north of Cave City for considerable distance." Cave City was established nearby in the 1850s and Prewitt's Knob began to decline, but until 1858 it was still the largest town in the county outside of Glasgow.

In the first half of the 19th century, "the old three-day elections were held there." According to one history: "One of the voting precincts was here, and they voted early and they voted late. Liquor was a prime factor in producing the zeal necessary to a warm election. Whiskey in buckets, seasoned with mint, with dippers hanging on, sat on either side of the road. On one side was Democrat whiskey, and on the other, Whig or Know-Nothing whiskey. There were ginger cakes and cider galore. Men went around with chips on their shoulders, hollowing for their favorite candidates. Often the chips were knocked off; then a rough-and tumble fight."

In 1862, during the American Civil War, the armies of Don Buell and Braxton Bragg "faced each other in battle array" at Prewitt's Knob but did not fight. It was a village of at least some size until January 17, 1870, when the settlement was destroyed by a tornado in the "great Cave City storm...and never rebuilt". The privately owned Crystal Onyx Cave at Prewitt's Knob has been open to tourists since the 1960s.

== See also ==
- Bear Wallow, Barren County, Kentucky
