= Peach Orchard (disambiguation) =

Peach Orchard may refer to:

- The Peach Orchard, a Gettysburg Battlefield site.
- Peach Orchard, Arkansas
- Peach Orchard, Kentucky
- Peach Orchard, Missouri
- Peach Orchard Township, Ford County, Illinois
- An orchard where peaches are cultivated
- The Peach Orchard (album), an album by William Parker
