= Benjamin Martin House =

Historic house in Kentucky, United States

- U.S. National Register of Historic Places
- Location within Kentucky Location within the United States
- Location: Berry Store Rd., near Finney, Kentucky
- Coordinates: 36°55′44″N 86°07′34″W
- Area: less than one acre
- Built: 1812
- Built by: Benjamin Martin, Sr.
- Architectural style: Federal
- MPS: Barren County MRA
- NRHP reference No.: 83002535
- Added to NRHP: May 20, 1983

The Benjamin Martin House near Finney, Kentucky was built in 1812 by Benjamin Martin Sr., who lived from 1758 to 1838, and came to Kentucky from Virginia in 1784.

It is one of few Federal-style brick houses surviving from its era in Barren County, Kentucky.

The house was listed on the National Register of Historic Places in 1983.
