= Nobob, Kentucky =

Unincorporated community in Kentucky, United States

Nobob
- Unincorporated community
- Location within the state of Kentucky Nobob (the United States)
- Coordinates: 36°51′55″N 85°46′27″W
- Country: United States
- State: Kentucky
- County: Barren
- Elevation: 833 ft (254 m)
- Time zone: UTC-6 (Central (CST))
  - Summer (DST): UTC-5 (CST)
- GNIS feature ID: 508712

Nobob is an unincorporated community in Barren County, Kentucky, United States.

== History ==
Nobob was also known as Flathead. A post office called Nobob was established in 1854, and remained in operation until it was discontinued in 1936. The community took its name from nearby Nobob Creek.
