= Griderville, Kentucky =

Unincorporated community in Kentucky, United States

Griderville
- Unincorporated community
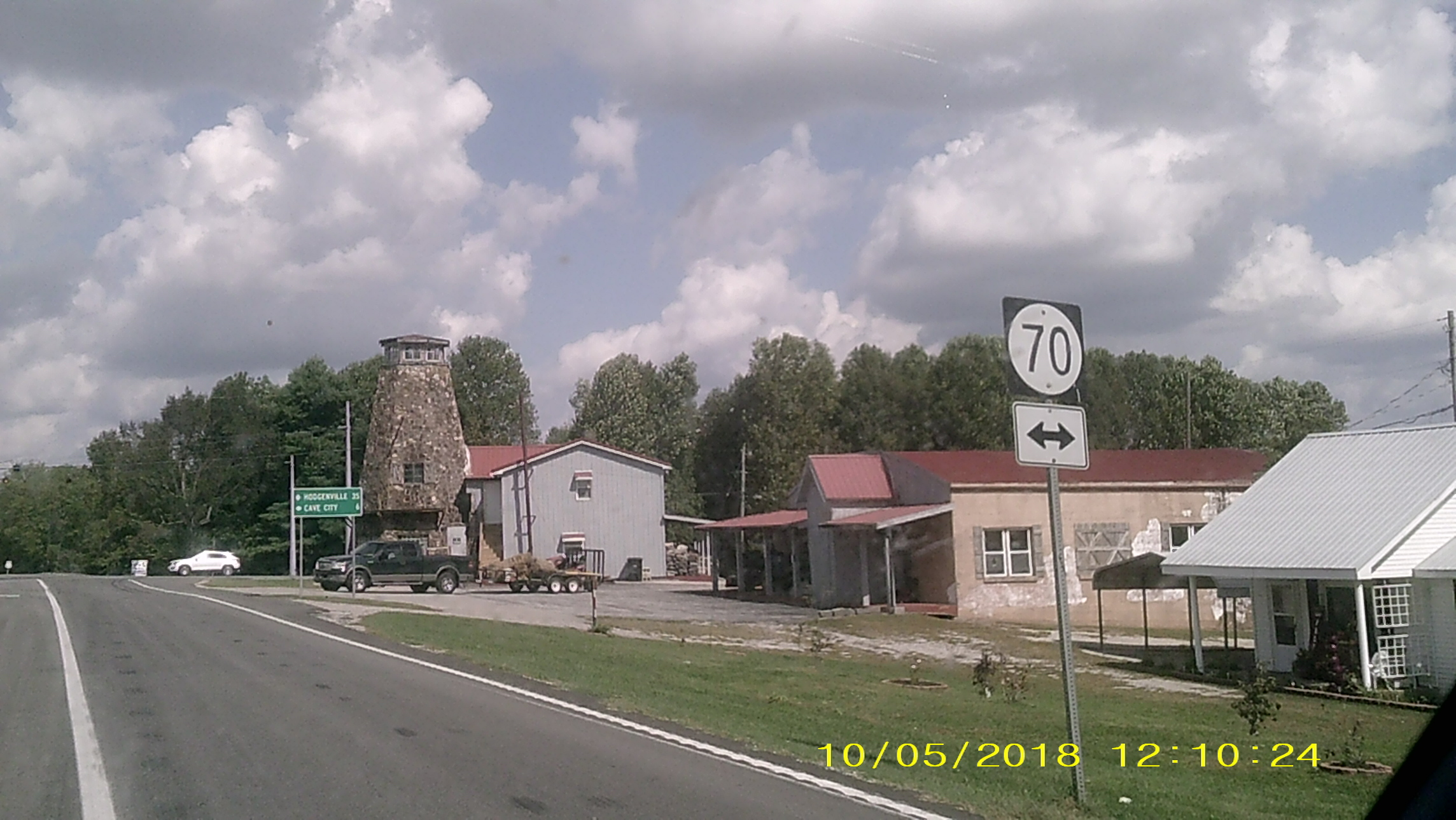
- Old Dutch Mill at the US 31E junction with KY 70 in October 2018

- Location within the state of Kentucky Griderville (the United States)
- Coordinates: 37°06′46″N 85°52′13″W
- Country: United States
- State: Kentucky
- County: Barren
- Elevation: 741 ft (226 m)
- Time zone: UTC−6 (CST)
  - Summer (DST): UTC−5 (CDT)
- ZIP codes: 42127
- GNIS feature ID: 508137

Griderville is a rural unincorporated community in northern Barren County, Kentucky, United States.

== Geography ==
The community is located in the north-central portion of Barren County, at the junction of U.S. Route 31E and Kentucky Route 70. US 31E leads south to Glasgow, and north to Hardyville and Hodgenville. KY 70 leads 4 miles (6.4 km) west to Cave City and the Mammoth Cave National Park, and east to Hiseville.

== Post office ==
Griderville is currently served by the Cave City post office by default with ZIP code 42127.
