= Slick Rock =

Slick Rock and Slickrock may refer to:

- Slick Rock, Colorado, an unincorporated community in San Miguel County
- Slick Rock, Kentucky, an unincorporated community in Barren County
- Slick Rock Falls, a waterfall in Western North Carolina
- Slickrock Trail, near Moab, Utah
