= Lecta, Kentucky =

Unincorporated community in Kentucky, United States

Lecta
- Unincorporated community
- Location within the state of Kentucky Lecta (the United States)
- Coordinates: 37°00′40″N 85°51′22″W
- Country: United States
- State: Kentucky
- County: Barren
- Elevation: 787 ft (240 m)
- Time zone: UTC-6 (Central (CST))
  - Summer (DST): UTC-5 (CST)
- GNIS feature ID: 508436

Lecta is an unincorporated community in Barren County, Kentucky, United States. Lecta had a post office from 1900 until 1955.
