= Pritchardsville, Kentucky =

Unincorporated community in Kentucky, United States

Pritchardsville
- Unincorporated community
- Location within the state of Kentucky Pritchardsville (the United States)
- Coordinates: 36°58′20″N 85°56′14″W
- Country: United States
- State: Kentucky
- County: Barren
- Elevation: 650 ft (200 m)
- Time zone: UTC−6 (CST)
  - Summer (DST): UTC−5 (CDT)
- ZIP codes: 42141
- GNIS feature ID: 501353

Pritchardsville is a rural unincorporated community in central Barren County, Kentucky, United States.
