= WBFI =

- McDaniels, Kentucky; United States
- Broadcast area: Leitchfield, Kentucky; Hardinsburg, Kentucky
- Frequency: 91.5 MHz

Programming
- Format: Gospel Music

Ownership
- Owner: Bethel Fellowship Church and Christian School; (Bethel Fellowship, Inc.)

History
- First air date: 1987

Technical information
- Licensing authority: FCC
- Facility ID: 4989
- Class: A
- ERP: 5,000 watts
- HAAT: 100.0 meters
- Transmitter coordinates: 37°36′6″N 86°22′13″W
- Translators: (98.3 MHz) W252CW (Rockport, IN) (91.1 MHz) WBFK (Hiseville, KY)

Links
- Public license information: Public file; LMS
- Website: WBFI website

WBFI (91.5 FM) is a radio station broadcasting Contemporary Christian media and Gospel music. The station is licensed to McDaniels, Kentucky, United States. The station is currently owned by Bethel Fellowship, Inc.

== History ==
After the construction permit was initially issued in 1985, the station first signed on the air in 1987 under ownership of the Bethel Fellowship Church and Christian School. It originally functioned as an educational tool for the school, as well as outreach media outlet of the church.

In 2017, the station became the flagship for a regional network called BoxTwo Radio Network primarily distributed on the Tithe.ly Church app.

== Popular shows ==
- Morning with Box2 Radio - a popcast type show hosted but Pastor Aaron Wilson and Hannah Ayse. 7-9 am, replayed 9-10:30 pm Monday through Friday
- Family Talk hosted by Dr. James Dobson. 10:30-11 am Monday Through Friday
- Salt Covenant Hour with Brother Ron Miller Noon-1 pm, replayed 10:30-11:30 pm Monday through Friday

There is day specific Programming and weekends have their own schedule.

== Translators ==
In addition to the main station, WBFI is relayed by a translator to widen its broadcast area.

Call sign	Frequency	City of license	FID	ERP (W)	Class	FCC info
W252CW	98.3 FM	Owensboro, Kentucky	145264	55	D	LMS
WBFK	91.1 FM	Hiseville, Kentucky	176881	6000	A	LMS
