= Henry Skaggs =

Hunter and explorer (1724–1810)

- Born: January 8, 1724; Province of Maryland, British Royal Colony, British North America, British Empire, present-day Maryland
- Died: December 4, 1810 (aged 86); Barren County, Kentucky, US
- Occupations: Frontiersman; hunter; land agent; explorer
- Known for: Being a frontiersmen along with Daniel Boone and Richard Henderson, who explored a large part of Middle Tennessee and central Kentucky, as a land agent and longhunter; Skaggs led a frontier posse in the unsuccessful pursuit and capture of America's first known serial killers, the Harpe brothers in 1799
- Spouse: Mary Thompson Skaggs

Henry Skaggs (January 8, 1724 – December 4, 1810. Occasional alternative spellings: "Skeggs" and "Scaggs") was an American longhunter, explorer, and pioneer, active primarily on the frontiers of Tennessee and Kentucky during the latter half of the 18th century. His career as an explorer began as early as 1761 as one of what was known as longhunters—men who undertook lengthy hunting expeditions into the Trans-Allegheny wilderness. Then working as a land agent with Richard Henderson and Daniel Boone, he explored a large part of Middle Tennessee and central Kentucky. Skaggs led a pursuit and failed attempt to apprehend America's first known serial killers, the Harpe brothers in 1799.

== Background ==
Henry Skaggs was born on January 8, 1724, in the Province of Maryland, British Royal Colony, British North America, in the British Empire to James Skaggs, a Scots-Irish immigrant and his wife Rachel. James Skaggs and his sons were renowned hunters and fur traders.

== Longhunter ==
In 1761, Henry Skaggs joined an expedition, led by Elisha Walden, into Carter's Valley in present-day Hawkins County, Tennessee. That was followed by a 1763 trip deeper into Cumberland territory. In 1764, he led his first expedition through the Cumberland Gap, a mountain pass at the junction of Kentucky, Tennessee, and Virginia. The early trips westward attracted the interest of famed explorer Daniel Boone. Boone used his existing relationship with Richard Henderson, a North Carolina land speculator Richard Henderson to recruit Skaggs as an agent for Henderson's land company, Richard Henderson and Company. In 1765, Skaggs explored the lower Cumberland River region (upper Middle Tennessee) as an agent of Henderson in the vicinity of the future site of Mansker's Station near what is now Goodlettsville, Tennessee.

In the fall of 1769, Skaggs returned to the Cumberland with Kasper Mansker, Joseph Drake, and Colonel James Knox. The expedition reached the Dix River in Kentucky and pressed on into Green River country. On a day on the journey, the group heard an unusual sound coming from the woods near Big Barren River. Mansker proceeded to investigate only to find the source of the mysterious noise to be Daniel Boone, sprawled on a deerskin, singing. The Boones, Daniel and Squire, Daniel's younger brother, stayed with the expedition for a week or two, harvesting wild meat and rendering tallow. “Skaggs Creek,” with headwaters in Monroe County which flows through Barren County into Big Barren River—a tributary of Green River, memorializes Henry Skaggs’ exploratory ventures in that section of the Green River country.

Part of the Wilderness Road, crossing Rockcastle County, Kentucky, from Hazel Patch to Crab Orchard, was known as "Skaggs Trace," named after Skaggs. In June 1775, he and Valentine Harman, a member of the Transylvania Convention at Boonesborough in May, led Colonel Thomas Slaughter to the Green River area of Kentucky to explore the land on behalf of Henderson's Transylvania Company, which had recently purchased the area along with a large portion of Central Kentucky.

== In pursuit of serial killers, The Harpes ==
In 1799, Skaggs led the frontier pursuit of the notorious serial killers, the Harpe brothers, in western Kentucky. Several vigilante posses were formed to look for the escaped criminals, but the only one which found them became frightened and ran. Skaggs, enraged, tried to reform the scattered party and pursue the Harpes, but to no avail. Undeterred, he pressed on alone, and an hour later encountered a crowd of some 20-30 settlers, jigging and drinking in the cabin of some newcomers at the close of a house-raising celebration. Skaggs told them his vital news. The men, already quite drunk, grabbed bottles and rifles indiscriminately and joined the hunt for the Harpes. Once in the forest, however, the posse's enthusiasm evaporated. Again, Skaggs had his followers vanish and he and continued on alone.

Skaggs came to the cabin of a pioneer named Colonel Daniel Trabue, an old Indian fighter. Trabue agreed to join the hunt for the Harpes as soon as his son returned from an errand to borrow some flour and beans from a neighbor. Unfortunately for Trabue, the famished Harpes found his son first. The son's blood-soaked dog returned to the cabin and led Trabue and Skaggs to the sinkhole where the Harpes had discarded his body. He had been brutally beaten and tomahawked and his load of supplies was stolen. Skaggs and Trabue searched for days, but never found the Harpes.

== Final Years ==
Land claims in the military district of Kentucky south of Green River were restricted to grants for veterans of the Revolutionary War until 1796. After Barren County, Kentucky, was organized (1798) from parts of Warren County and Green County, Henry Skaggs filed a claim in July, 1801, in Barren County Court for 200 acres of land. The original survey and deed have not been examined. The tract was evidently located at or near present-day Hiseville in Barren County, where he probably lived until his deat

Henry Skaggs died of natural causes, on December 4, 1810.

== DNA testing ==
Extensive Y-DNA testing has been done on Skaggs's family with four descendants of two of his brothers, James and Jacob, testing positive for subclade R-BY44771.
