= Barren River Lake =

Reservoir in Kentucky, United States

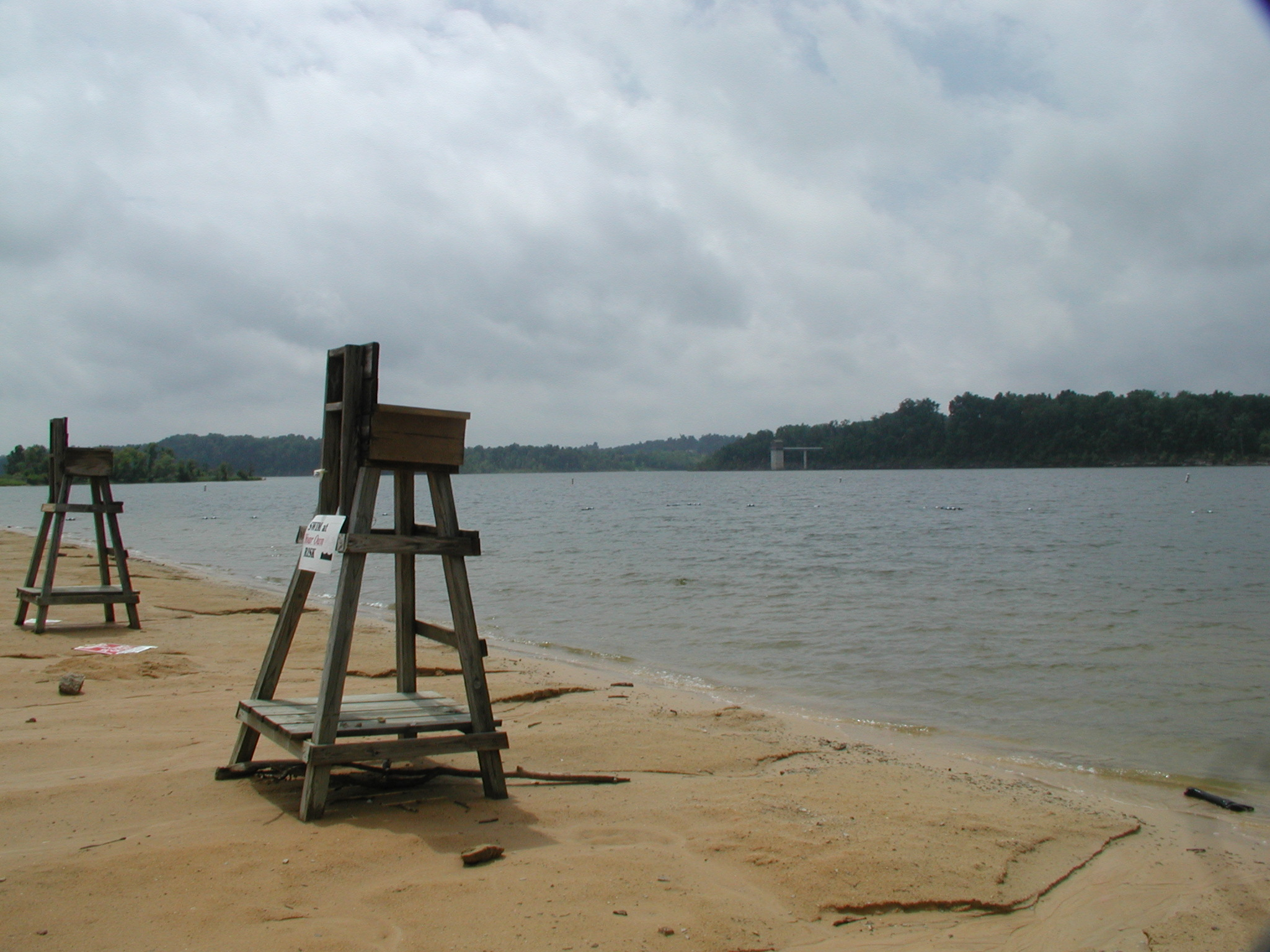
- View from Barren River Lake State Resort Park

- Location within Kentucky Location within the United States
- Location: Kentucky
- Coordinates: 36°53′35″N 86°7′30″W
- Type: reservoir
- Primary inflows: Barren River
- Primary outflows: Barren River
- Basin countries: United States
- Surface area: 10,100 acres (41 km^{2})
- Surface elevation: 551 ft (168 m)
- Islands: 3

Barren River Lake is a 10,100 acres (41 km^{2}), reservoir in Kentucky created by the U.S. Army Corps of Engineers in 1964 by impounding the Barren River. The lake occupies parts of Allen, Barren, and Monroe counties.

The Barren River Lake Dam is an earthen dam, 146 feet (45 m) high and 3,970 feet (1,210 m) long at its crest. The U.S. Army Corps of Engineers is responsible for operation and maintenance of the project, and responsible for protection of the resource. A small segment of the property owned by the U.S. Army Corps of Engineers is leased to Barren River Lake State Resort Park and lies along a section of shoreline in Barren County.

== Islands ==
The lake has three large islands.

In the widest part of the lake, there are two large islands, each about one square mile (2.6 km^{2}) in size. And another smaller island near the main boat ramp and camp-site.

There is also another, which is sometimes partly connected to the surrounding land, but sometimes surrounded by lake water, depending on water levels.
