= John Mayfield House =

- U.S. National Register of Historic Places
- Location within Kentucky Location within the United States
- Nearest city: Glasgow, Kentucky
- Coordinates: 36°59′06″N 85°58′54″W
- Area: less than one acre
- Architectural style: Federal
- MPS: Barren County MRA
- NRHP reference No.: 83002536
- Added to NRHP: May 20, 1983

The John Mayfield House is a historic house in Glasgow, Kentucky, United States. It was built in the 1830s for John Mayfield and his family. It was later acquired by W. L. Steffey, and his family inherited the property after his death. It was designed in the Federal architectural style. It has been listed on the National Register of Historic Places since May 20, 1983.
