= Peter Creek, Kentucky =

Unincorporated community in Kentucky, United States

Peter Creek
- Unincorporated community
- Location within the state of Kentucky Peter Creek (the United States)
- Coordinates: 36°50′42″N 85°58′45″W
- Country: United States
- State: Kentucky
- County: Barren
- Elevation: 646 ft (197 m)
- Time zone: UTC-6 (Central (CST))
  - Summer (DST): UTC-5 (CST)
- GNIS feature ID: 508807

Peter Creek is an unincorporated community in Barren County, Kentucky, United States. Peter Creek had a post office from 1828 to 1894.
