= William Page House =

- U.S. National Register of Historic Places
- Location within Kentucky Location within the United States
- Nearest city: Glasgow, Kentucky
- Coordinates: 36°54′51″N 85°55′18″W
- Area: 6 acres (2.4 ha)
- Built: 1814
- Architectural style: Federal
- MPS: Barren County MRA
- NRHP reference No.: 83002542
- Added to NRHP: May 20, 1983

The William Page House is a historic house in Glasgow, Kentucky. It was built in 1814–1815 by William Page, a farmer, on land he had brought from John H. Baker in 1812. The house was inherited by his daughter Elizabeth, who married Colonel Robert Strange; it has also been known as the Colonel Robert Strange House. The family owned slaves. The house was designed in the Federal architectural style. It has been listed on the National Register of Historic Places since May 20, 1983.

It has an early hall-parlor plan, "exceptionally well-laid brick work," and "very fine interior woodwork".
