= Bear Wallow, Barren County, Kentucky =

Unincorporated community in Kentucky, United States

Bear Wallow
- Unincorporated community
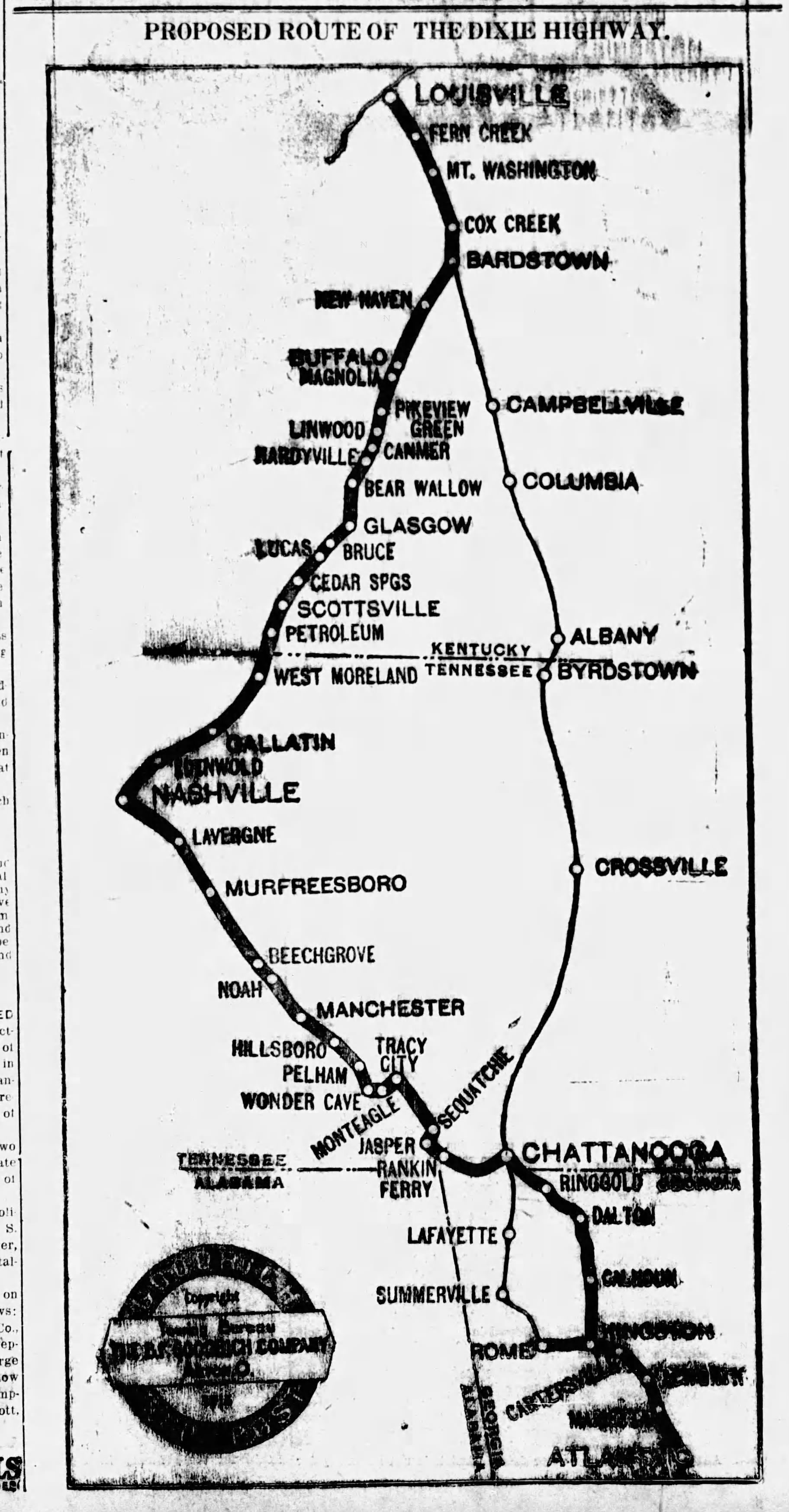
- "Proposed Route of the Dixie Highway" (The Gleaner, Henderson, Kentucky, April 13, 1915)

- Location within the state of Kentucky Bear Wallow (the United States)
- Coordinates: 37°9′6″N 85°51′22″W
- Country: United States
- State: Kentucky
- County: Barren
- Elevation: 692 ft (211 m)
- Time zone: UTC-6 (Central (CST))
  - Summer (DST): UTC-5 (CST)
- GNIS feature ID: 507466

Bear Wallow is a historic location and unincorporated community in Barren County, Kentucky, United States. Bear Wallow is on the far northern boundary of the county, immediately adjacent to the Hart County border. Bear Wallow was located along a trace through wilderness that later became U.S. Route 31E. The site of the old Bear Wallow village was 11 mi (18 km) from Glasgow, Kentucky, and 5 mi (8.0 km) from Horse Cave.

== Geography ==
The Bear Wallow was originally a stopping point on the indigenous wilderness trail between what is now Lexington, Kentucky, and Nashville, Tennessee, connecting thence to routes southwest, such as the Natchez Trace. In the early colonization era, Bear Wallow was the best-known "camping place" for travelers moving between Lexington and Nashville. The name is because the spring-fed pond was a popular watering hole for wildlife including bison and bears.

There were only a scant handful of white settlers living in the area prior to 1798. According to a description written by the child of pioneers, "At this early day the whole county was a wilderness; the cane and pea vines which covered it, in many places being as high as a man's head when on horseback. The soil was so rich and loose that a horse, in walking, would sink up to its fetlocks. The country north, north-northwest and northeast of Glasgow was mostly barrens, poorly watered and lightly timbered. The Barrens, which were covered with strawberry and heather grass, five or six feet high, afforded fine grazing for stock, elk, deer, and buffalo, but was thought unfit for cultivation. That however, subsequently proved to be the richest lands. Most of this barren area was underlaid with caverns, several of which were used to make saltpeter; some of them being mammoth, long and short and others. The saltpeter made from them was hauled by wagon to Philadelphia to make powder for the war of 1812 to 15."

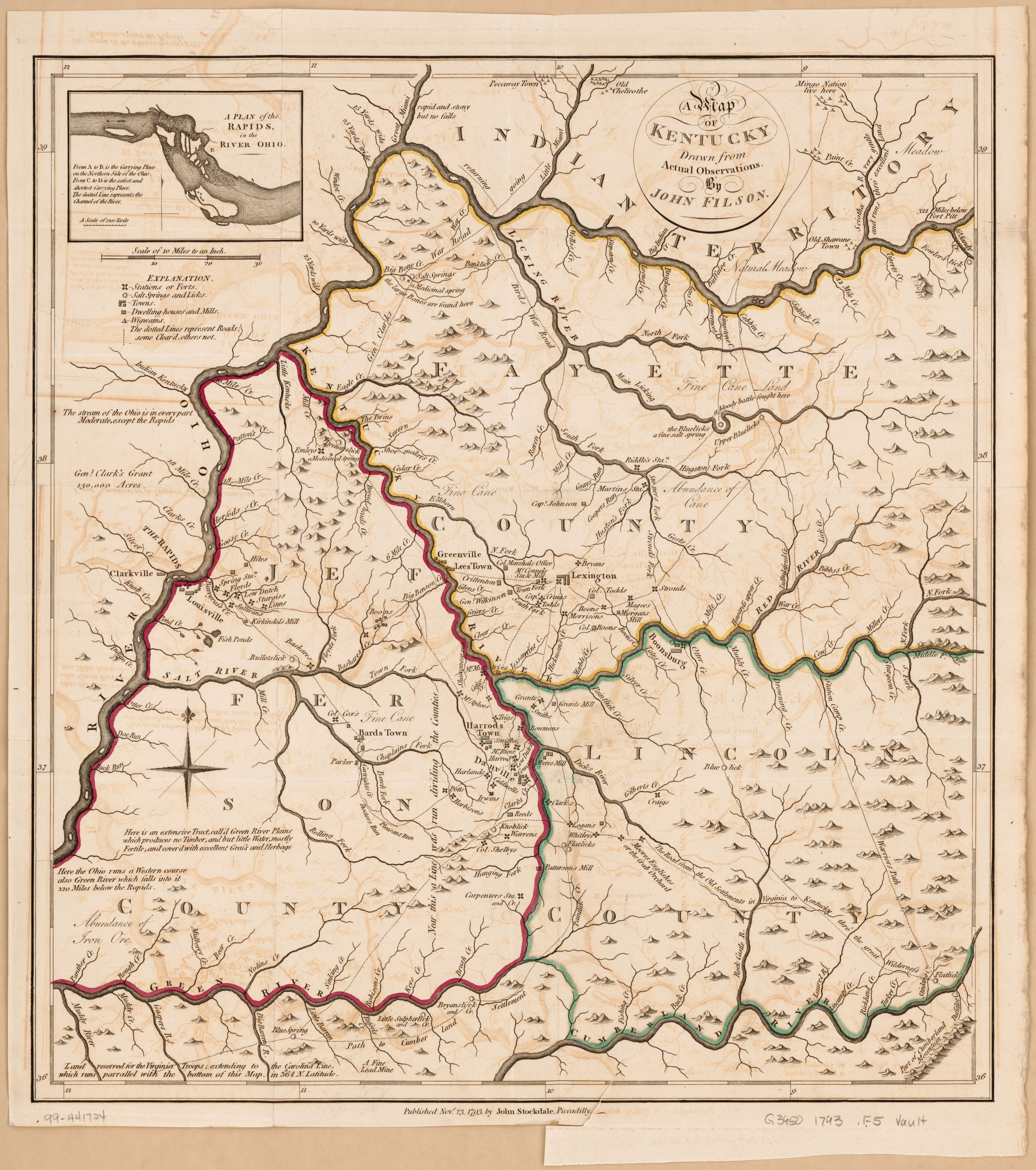
Filson's 1794 map of Kentucky showing the trail between the Cumberland settlement and Blue Spring in the Green River watershed

A newspaper account described Bear Wallow as "on what is frequently called the northern Lexington road of Barren Co., some times spoken of as the New Orleans Trace...there were two places of special importance. One was Bear Wallow, which had an excellent spring of cold, never-failing water, surrounded by a magnificent grove of beautiful trees." The "Trace" route toward the "lower country" and New Orleans "crossed Barren River three miles above Bowling Green; ran thence to the Dripping Spring; past Bear Wallow, leaving Prewitt's Knob one mile to the left; and crossed Little Barren River at the Elk Lick, a mile or so above the mouth. A trace was soon made to Mann's Salt Lick in Bullitt county, and one which passed through the northwest corner of the county to McFadin's Station on Big Barren River."

== Lincolniana ==
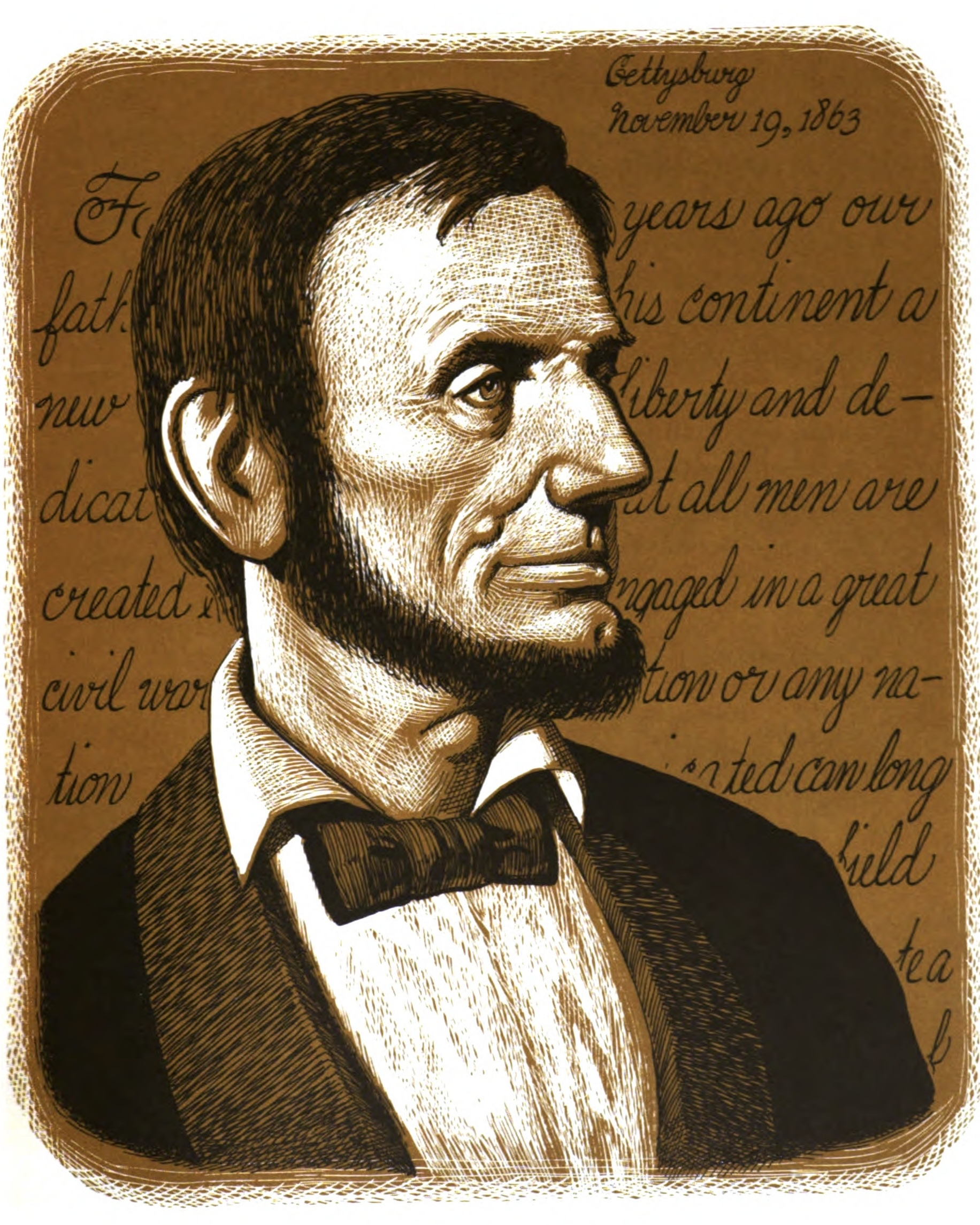
Lincoln by Leonard Everett Fisher (1957)

Multiple newspaper accounts suggest that Abraham Lincoln's parents could have known Bear Wallow. A surveyor recorded plats for Thomas Lincoln in the vicinity. A letter to the editor of the Louisville Courier-Journal claimed that the family traveled through Bear Wallow on their migration to Indiana, per a woman who claimed "my grandmother furnished Miss Hanks her wedding dress". An obituary of 1909 also placed the Lincolns in the settlement:

Uncle Albert Richardson died at his home near Bear Wallow, near the Barren and Hart county line, aged 107 years. He was an ex-slave and before his freedom belonged to the late Thornton Richardson. He made his living by weaving baskets out of bark and bottoming chairs, which vocation he followed until a few days before his death. Uncle Albert claimed to have "toted" in his arms Abraham Lincoln, when he was a little child.

== History ==
The first permanent non-Indigenous settler at the Bear Wallow was said to be a Philip Maxey. He was still in residence as of 1816. The Bear Wallow became the site of a tavern was owned by a man named B. Jackson, who also owned the thousand acres surrounding, which were farmed by his slaves. The first tavern building was made of hand-hewn logs.

It was a long, low structure, with double rooms large enough to make several of our modern-day rooms; the upper rooms were a half story; the windows were few and small, the tiny old-time panes being used in them; the chimneys were quite large, built of hewn stone, the fireplaces filled with great logs in winter and asparagus bowers in summer were huge in size and would accommodate almost a wagon load of wood at a time. Certain slaves were assigned the task of firing these fireplaces, especially in the extremely cold weather. The sleeping rooms for the guests were large and scantily furnished. In winter they were fearfully cold, except when one snuggled down in a great, soft feather bed and drew over him the homewoven blankets and home-pieced quilts. In summer, these same rooms were quite hot, since the windows were few and very small.

The dining room and kitchen were detached from the main building for fear of fire. Back some distance were the cabins of the...slaves. Almost any time, night or day, one could hear music from these cabins sometimes the harp or the banjo, again the fiddle, or old Aunt Judy...[singing] "The old ark is a-movin', a-movin', a-movin' right along."

In front of the Tavern, in a very conspicious place, there was an immense sign—a great black bear, with weird, staring, yellow eyes; under it was the lone word, "Wallow." This sign was the pride and joy not only of "mine host" but of the entire village. A tradition grew up about it among the slaves, that if a negro was even contemplating trying to reach freedom by crossing the Ohio River, or if a runaway negro came near it, the yellow eyes of the bear would change color and glow "like fiery embers." Whenever a negro saw this change, he was overcome with fright and would run "like the Devil and Tom Walker were after him."

From Jackson, ownership of the tavern passed to Robert Ferguson. The county line between Hart and Barren was reportedly moved to run directly through the tavern so that Ferguson could legally serve as a justice of the peace of Barren County. In the early 19th century Bear Wallow was said to be a "thriving little village" with a one-story wood-frame general store slash post office, and the tavern. Around 1829, Ferguson demolished the log building and replaced it with a brick-built structure.

Turnpike roads for use by stagecoaches and other travelers through Barren County were first chartered in the 1830s. The road chartered 1835–36 was meant to run through Bear Wallow and Glasgow between Bardstown to Nashville, but it was never finished. As of 1838 it was said to be located where "the turnpike road from Bardstown to Nashville crosses the Lexington Road". Later, the so-called lower Louisville and Nashville Turnpike ran through Bear Wallow; the upper Louisville and Nashville turnpike ran through nearby Cave City. The stagecoaches were run, at least in part, by the Louisville and Nashville Stage Company. In the 20th century this Bardstown–Glasgow road was known as the Jackson Highway.

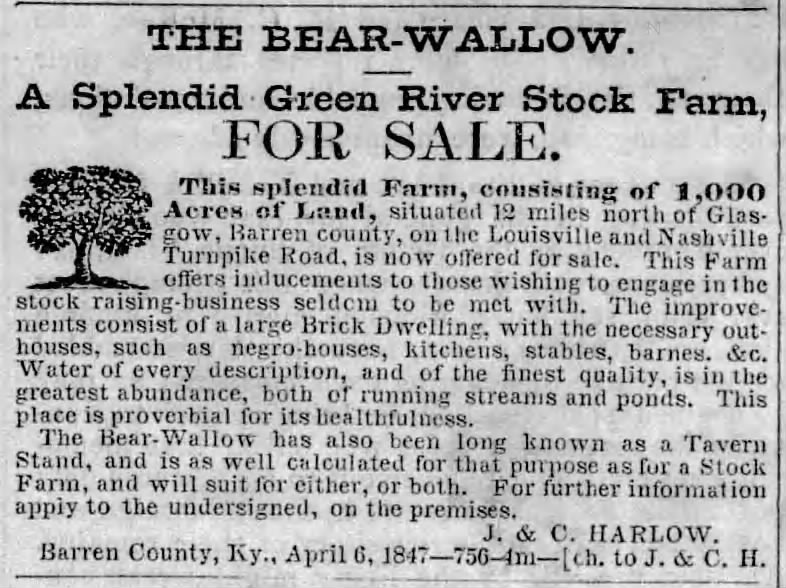
"THE BEAR-WALLOW: A Splendid Green River Stock Farm for Sale" The Frankfort Commonwealth, Frankfort, Kentucky, April 20, 1847

Ferguson sold the tavern to "Horatio C. Short. In the 1840s due to misfortune, the land passed over to Claiborne [Harlow] and John Harlow. They divided the land between themselves. Claiborne, owning the portion on which the Inn was situated, sold it to William Hare in 1847. During the time Mr. Hare owned it some of the buildings were torn down, and the Inn was closed for a short time. Mr. Hare held it until the Civil War when he sold it to Tony Anderson." A man named Jim Hare lived in Bear Wallow around the same time as William Hare, as Jim Hare's daughter was born there in 1846, at which time he was occupied by "the mercantile business". During the Billy Hare era, "here a relay was started" and at its peak "eight stages a day" passed through Bear Wallow connecting New York and New Orleans.

Bear Wallow appears in accounts of troop movements during the American Civil War. In September 1862 Braxton Bragg's men camped near Bear Wallow, which was described at that time as a "post town in Barren County". In December 1862, U.S. troops attacked a Rebel camp at Bear Wallow and took 16 prisoners. Troops under command of John Hunt Morgan passed through the town. Leonidas Polk's soldiers moved through Bear Wallow on the way to Munfordville, Kentucky.

At some point the tavern was passed into the hands of "big Silas Fishburn who was a refugee of New Orleans. Fishburn killed two men in New Orleans and escaped upriver to Nashville; rode freight wagon to Port Oliver Salt Works. Later he migrated to Glasgow, then on to Bear Wallow Tavern, bringing with him his half-breed wife whom he called 'Coo Moo'. Fishburn, alias Tom Fishorn, found sanctuary there but continued to carry on his sinful trade". In 1868 Fishburn sold out to Mr. Cooperider, who raised a family there, on a 600-acre "beautiful blue grass farm dotted about with large walnut trees". Cooperider reportedly expanded the inn, adding 11 rooms, and hosted the likes of circus man P. T. Barnum and touring singer Jenny Lind. Cooperider's son, C. W. Cooperider, began collecting American artifacts after finding "fine spearheads and arrows in the tobacco fields on the farm". The senior Cooperider sold the farm and moved to Missouri in 1880.

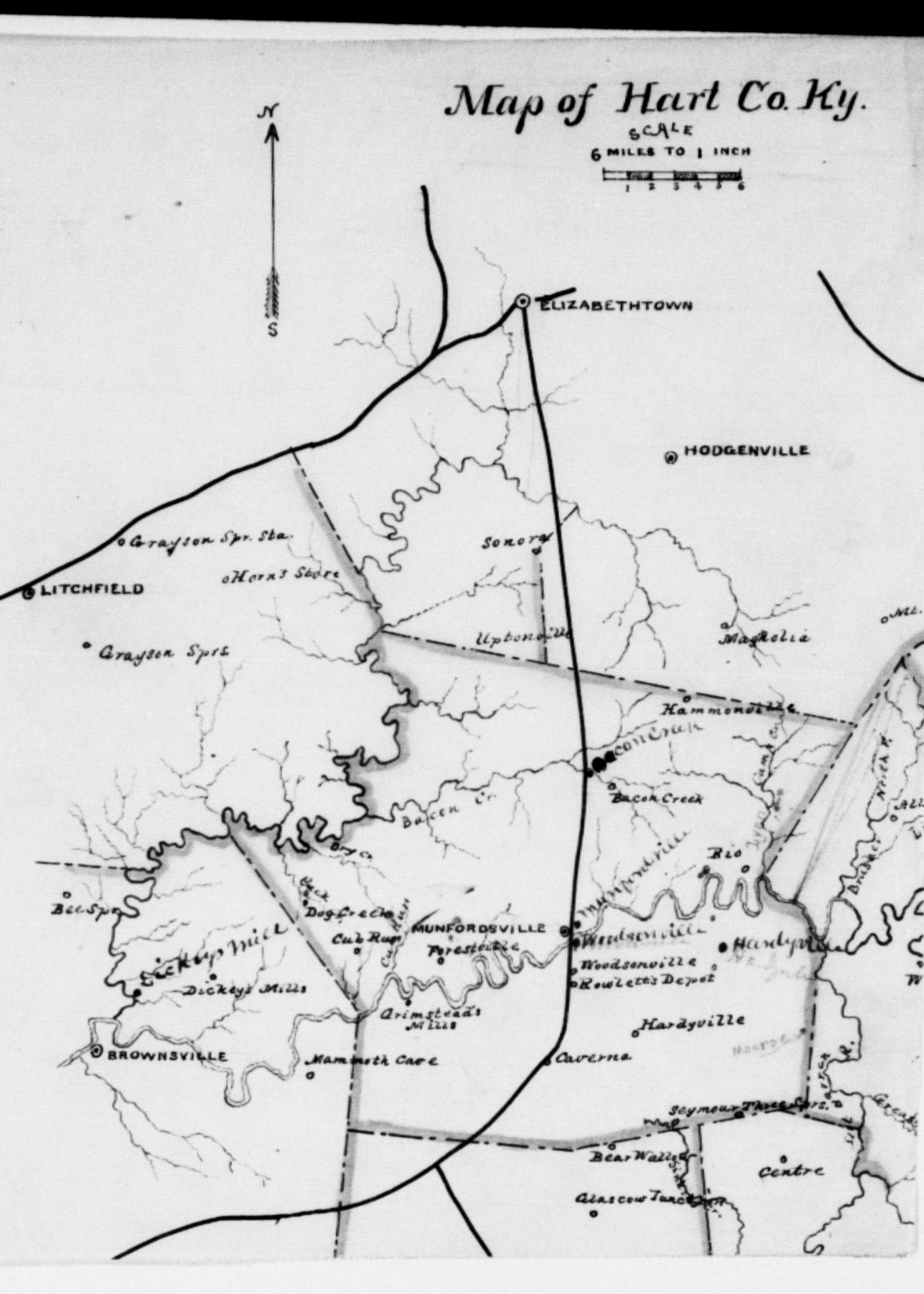
Undated hand-drawn map of Hart County, Kentucky, created by a U.S. postmaster, showing location of Bear Wallow on the Hart–Barren county line; nearby Glasgow Junction was "originally called Three Forks, since the New Orleans Trace divided it into three parts here. With the building of the Glasgow Branch Road, its name was changed to Glasgow Junction. It is now Park City, named so because it borders Mammoth Cave National Park"

There was a U.S. post office at Bear Wallow from 1850. In 1879 the U.S. Post Office Department accused the postmaster of Bear Wallow of having removed the post office of the town from Hart County into Barren and he replied that the post office was located in a drug store situated "directly" on top of the boundary line. There was also a grist mill in the settlement of Bear Wallow, and a blacksmith shop. There was probably a Bear Hollow church from the 1840s.

The children of one of the Bear Wallow storekeepers attended a local school called Amity Seminary. There was eventually a Bear Wallow schoolhouse. The antebellum Bear Wallow school was well-regarded and operated by an admired teacher named Stephen A. Collier. He supported the Union during the American Civil War and thus left Bear Wallow (whose townspeople were pro-Confederacy), and bought a building at Goodnight, where he opened another school called Mount Mary's Academy. A later school at Bear Wallow was taught by Rev. N. G. Terry.

== Decline ==
The tavern gradually fell out of use as a stopping place for travelers and was closed. The Bear Wallow post office closed in 1906. The brick building was used as a private residence until it was destroyed by fire on May 15, 1914. The settlement deteriorated and disappeared into history by the 1930s, in part due to having been bypassed by the railroads. The Glasgow Times newspaper published a romantic eulogy for the place in 1934.

In many respects, time has not dealt kindly, with Bear Wallow. Conditions which made it the center of a flourishing community, have changed. The old grist mill, after serving its purpose, gave way to the modern mills of nearby towns; the old building became the haunt of owls and bats, one by one, the great timbers yielded before the gnawing tooth of time and today no trace of it remains. Even the great pond, itself, the delight of both wild life and man has passed away and crops now grow where it stood. The old Tavern, once the center of much activity and life, ceased to function, when railroads came into general use; the huge stage coaches, with their strong, well-groomed horses and the skillful drivers were no longer needed; the stage horn with its wonderfully melodious sound, no longer is heard. The Black Bear with the yellow eyes has crumbled back to dust, and even the old brick is no more. A fire destroyed it a few years ago, and the slave quarters, once so picturesque, as they clustered around the Tavern, became tenantless and fell into the discard. The blacksmith shop, once glowing with life and light, as well as its giant keeper, have served their purpose and they, too have ceased to exist. The village store, once so necessary to the life of the community with the coming of better roads and better facilities for travel and the beginning of nearby railroad towns, was no longer needed and its doors were closed; its windows, once so bright and gay have become blear-eyed and useless.

As of 1981 Bear Wallow was described as a "farming community with a small population".

== See also ==
- Mann's Lick
