= Dry Fork, Kentucky =

Unincorporated community in Kentucky, United States

Dry Fork
- Unincorporated community
- Location within the state of Kentucky Dry Fork (the United States)
- Coordinates: 36°48′55″N 85°55′29″W
- Country: United States
- State: Kentucky
- County: Barren
- Elevation: 820 ft (250 m)
- Time zone: UTC−6 (CST)
  - Summer (DST): UTC−5 (CDT)
- ZIP codes: 42123
- GNIS feature ID: 507876

Dry Fork (or Dryfork) is a rural unincorporated community in southern Barren County, Kentucky, United States.

== History ==
Dry Fork is named for one of three forks of a local creek, which went dry in summer, located about "half a mile below Blue Spring at the Jacob Dillon old place". Dry Fork had a post office from 1848 to 1943.
