= Barren River Lake State Resort Park =

State park in Kentucky, United States

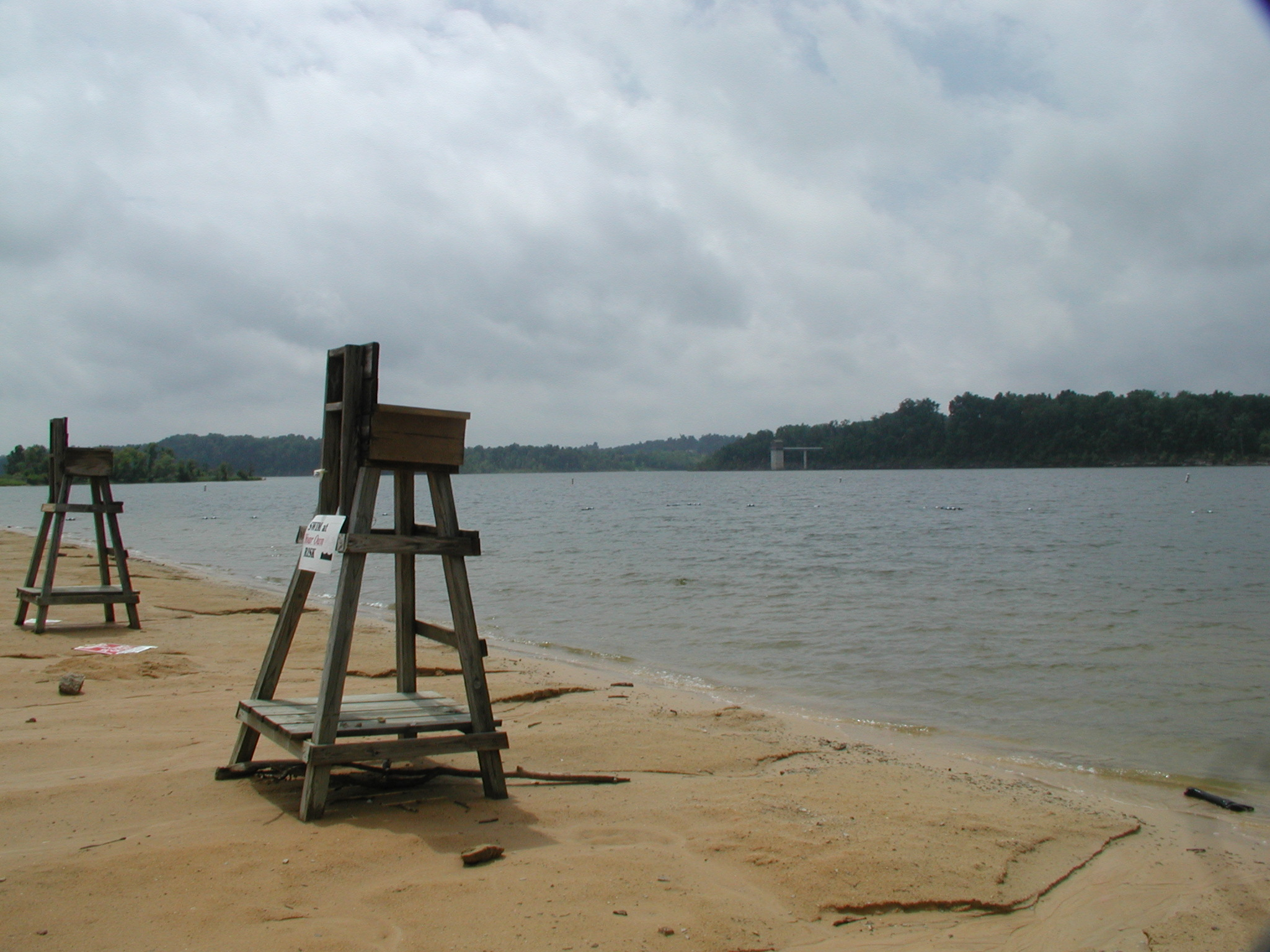

- Location within Kentucky Location within the United States
- Type: Kentucky state park
- Location: Barren County, Kentucky
- Coordinates: 36°51′56″N 86°04′09″W
- Area: 2,187 acres (885 ha)
- Created: 1965
- Operator: Kentucky Department of Parks
- Open: All year
- Website: Official website

Barren River Lake State Resort Park is a 1,053-acre (426 ha) park located in Barren County, Kentucky and extending into parts of Allen County and Monroe County. Barren River Lake, its major feature, is an artificial lake created with the building of a 146-foot-high (45 m) dam by the U.S. Army Corps of Engineers begun in 1960. It covers approximately 10,000 acres (4,000 ha) and has 141 miles (227 km) of shoreline. The park was dedicated in 1965.

== Attractions ==
Fishing is a major attraction at this park. The largest hybrid striped bass ever taken in Kentucky (20 lb., 8 oz.) was caught in Barren River Lake in 1991. The lake contains several other species of fish, including crappie, smallmouth bass, white bass, and big channel catfish.

The lake also includes 4 marinas to support boating and water skiing. Numerous trails provide hiking and biking opportunities. The most popular hiking trail is the 1-mile (1.6 km) Lewis Hill Trail which is also known as the Connell Nature Trail. Guided horseback rides are available seasonally. The park also features an eighteen-hole golf course.

== Events ==
The Trashmasters cleanup day is a popular volunteer event that helps keep the park clean. Also, each June, the park plays host to Glasgow's Highland Games, a miniature version of the Glasgow, Scotland tradition.
