= Cookstown (disambiguation) =

Cookstown is a town and townland in County Tyrone, Northern Ireland.

Cookstown may also refer to:

- Cookstown, Ontario, Canada
- Cookstown, Tallaght, Dublin, Ireland
- Cookstown, New Jersey, United States

== See also ==
- Cooktown (disambiguation)
