= Kidds Store, Virginia =

Unincorporated community in Virginia, United States

Coordinates: 37°48′13″N 78°21′42″W

Kidds Store is an unincorporated community in Fluvanna County, in the U.S. state of Virginia. Charlie Kidd, a proprietor of the store, has had his name associated with the store for 50 years. Kidd's store was owned and operated by James Taylor Kidd (1846-1918) until his death. His son V.S. Kidd (1875–1927) ran the store until his death. His wife, Charlotte "Lottie" Bledsoe Seay Kidd (1872–1955) rented out the store. Sometime in the 1940s Lottie's niece, Margaret Russell Seay Proffitt and her husband William Childress "Bill" Prioffitt, bought the store from Lottie. He renamed the store Proffitts Store. He ran the store until his death in 1961, his widow, Margaret Proffitt sold the store to Garvey Lewis. Garvey Lewis retained ownership of the building, but sold the business to Charlie Kidd.
