= Renfro Hotel =

- U.S. National Register of Historic Places
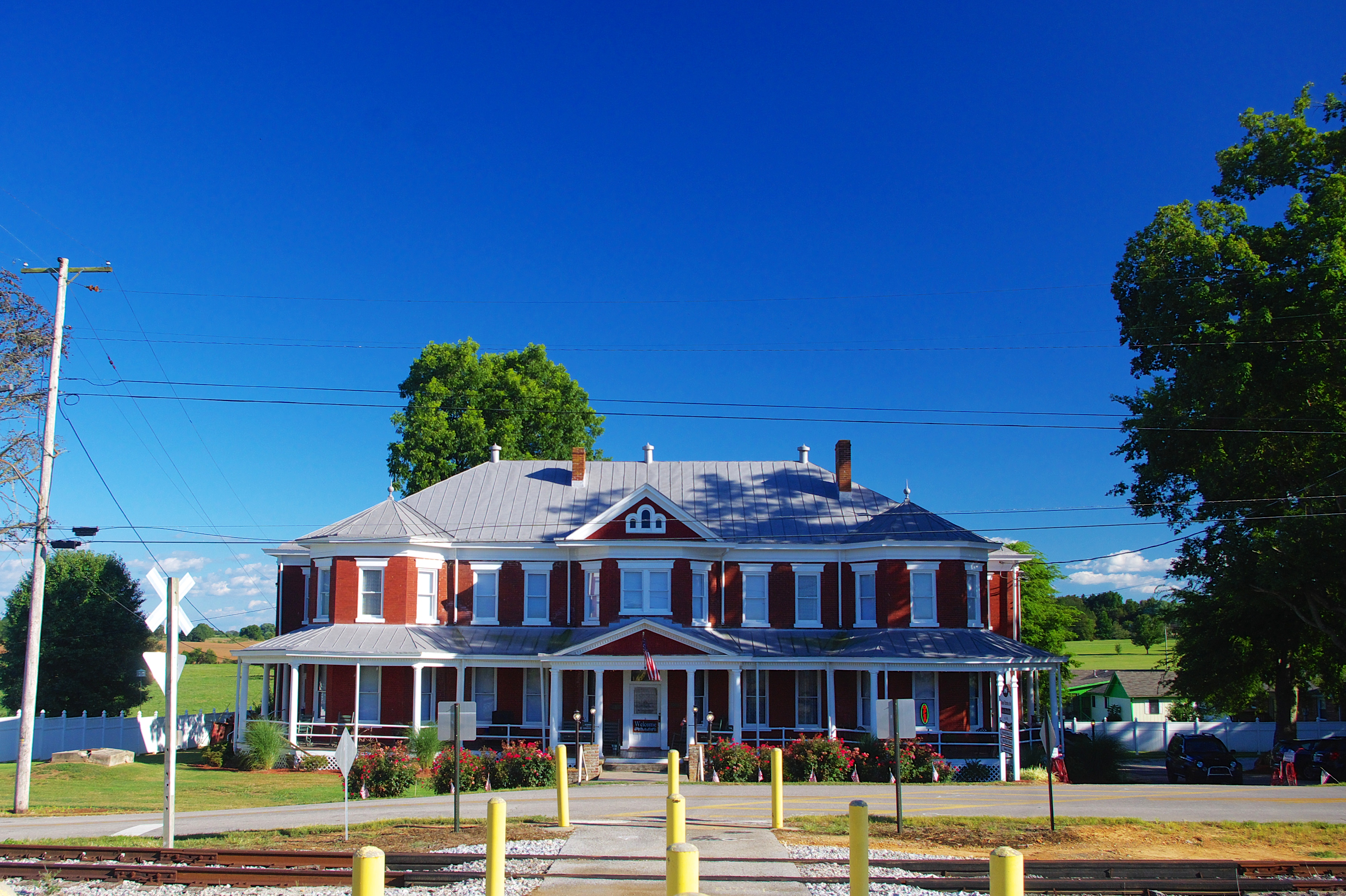

- Location within Kentucky Location within the United States
- Location: S. Dixie Ave., Park City, Kentucky
- Coordinates: 37°05′31″N 86°02′53″W
- Area: less than one acre
- Built: 1903
- Built by: Schyler Renfro
- MPS: Barren County MRA
- NRHP reference No.: 83002543
- Added to NRHP: May 20, 1983

The Renfro Hotel, located on S. Dixie Ave. in Park City, Kentucky, was built in 1903. It was listed on the National Register of Historic Places in 1983.

It is a brick and wood building built by Schyler Renfro, the owner. It became the Fishback Hotel in 1928 and in 1940 it became a school for boys.
