= Bybee House (Glasgow, Kentucky) =

- U.S. National Register of Historic Places
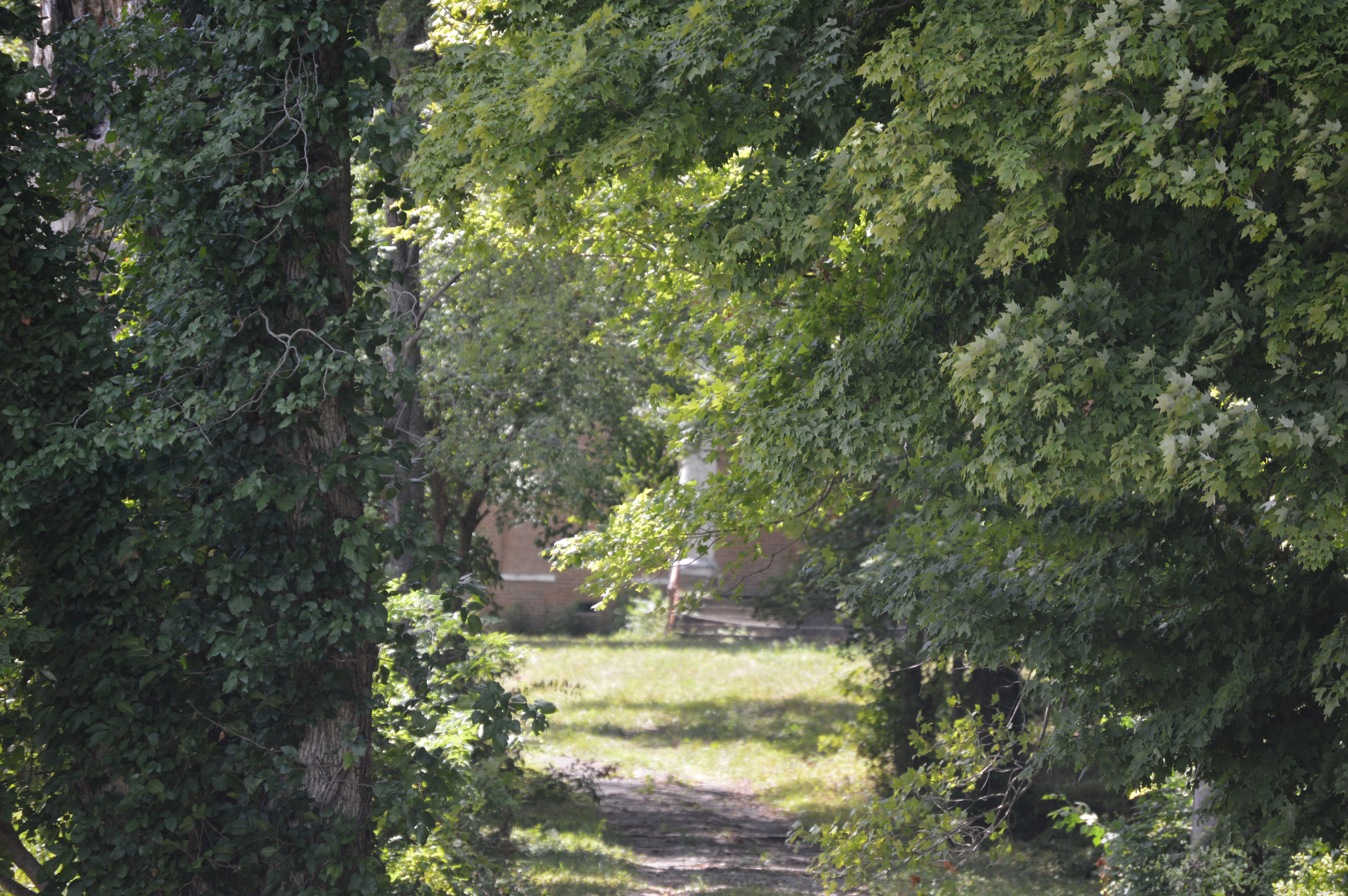

- Location within Kentucky Location within the United States
- Location: 3297 North Jackson Highway, Glasgow, Kentucky
- Coordinates: 37°02′20″N 85°54′13″W
- Area: 4.3 acres (1.7 ha)
- Built: 1855
- Built by: William Bybee
- Architectural style: Classical Revival
- NRHP reference No.: 12000444
- Added to NRHP: August 6, 2012

The Bybee House is a historic house in Glasgow, Kentucky. It was built for William Bybee, "a farmer, livestock trader and land speculator" in 1855, six years before the start of the American Civil War. and it was designed in the Classical Revival architectural style. It has been listed on the National Register of Historic Places since August 6, 2012.
