= Winston, Kentucky =

Unincorporated community in Kentucky, United States

- Unincorporated community
- Location within the state of Kentucky Winston (the United States)
- Coordinates: 37°42′20″N 84°4′56″W
- Country: United States
- State: Kentucky
- County: Estill
- Elevation: 883 ft (269 m)
- Time zone: UTC-5 (Eastern (EST))
  - Summer (DST): UTC-4 (CDT)
- ZIP codes: 40495
- GNIS feature ID: 506957

Winston is an unincorporated community located in Estill County, Kentucky, United States. Its post office is closed.
