= Oil City, Texas =

Town in Hutchinson County, Texas

Coordinates: 35°44′49″N 101°30′49″W

Oil City is a populated place located in Hutchinson County, Texas. Its elevation is 2,959 feet.
