= First Presbyterian Church (Glasgow, Kentucky) =

Historic church in Kentucky, United States

- U.S. National Register of Historic Places
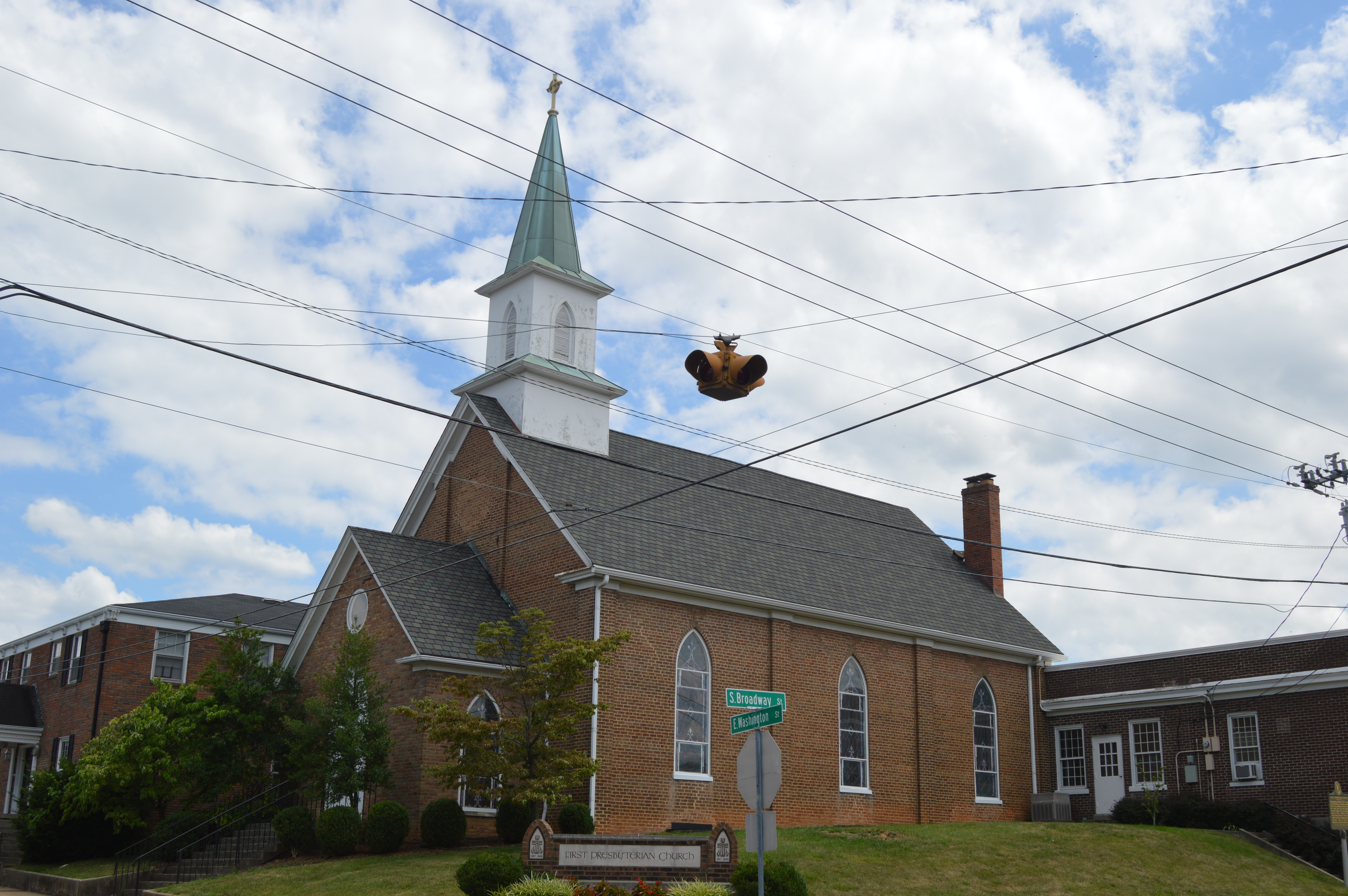
- Front and western side of the church

- Location within Kentucky Location within the United States
- Location: Washington and Broadway, Glasgow, Kentucky
- Coordinates: 36°59′39″N 85°54′40″W
- Area: less than one acre
- Built: 1853
- Architectural style: Gothic Revival
- MPS: Barren County MRA
- NRHP reference No.: 83002532
- Added to NRHP: May 20, 1983

The First Presbyterian Church in Glasgow, Kentucky is a historic church at Washington and Broadway which was built in 1853. It was added to the National Register of Historic Places in 1983.

The First Presbyterian Church was founded in 1803. Its 1853 brick building, at the original site for the church, is the oldest church building in Glasgow, and one of few Gothic Revival-style structures. It has pilasters, Gothic arches, a wood bell tower, and common bond brickwork.

== See also ==
- National Register of Historic Places listings in Kentucky
