= Nobob Creek =

Stream in Kentucky, U.S.

Coordinates: 36.8519984°N 85.8127526°W

Nobob Creek is a stream in the U.S. state of Kentucky.

Nobob Creek was named after an incident when the pioneer Robert Todd went missing near this stream. When inquiring whether he had been found, the answer was always "No Bob".

== See also ==
- List of rivers of Kentucky
