= Bybee House (Winchester, Kentucky) =

Historic house in Kentucky, United States

- U.S. National Register of Historic Places
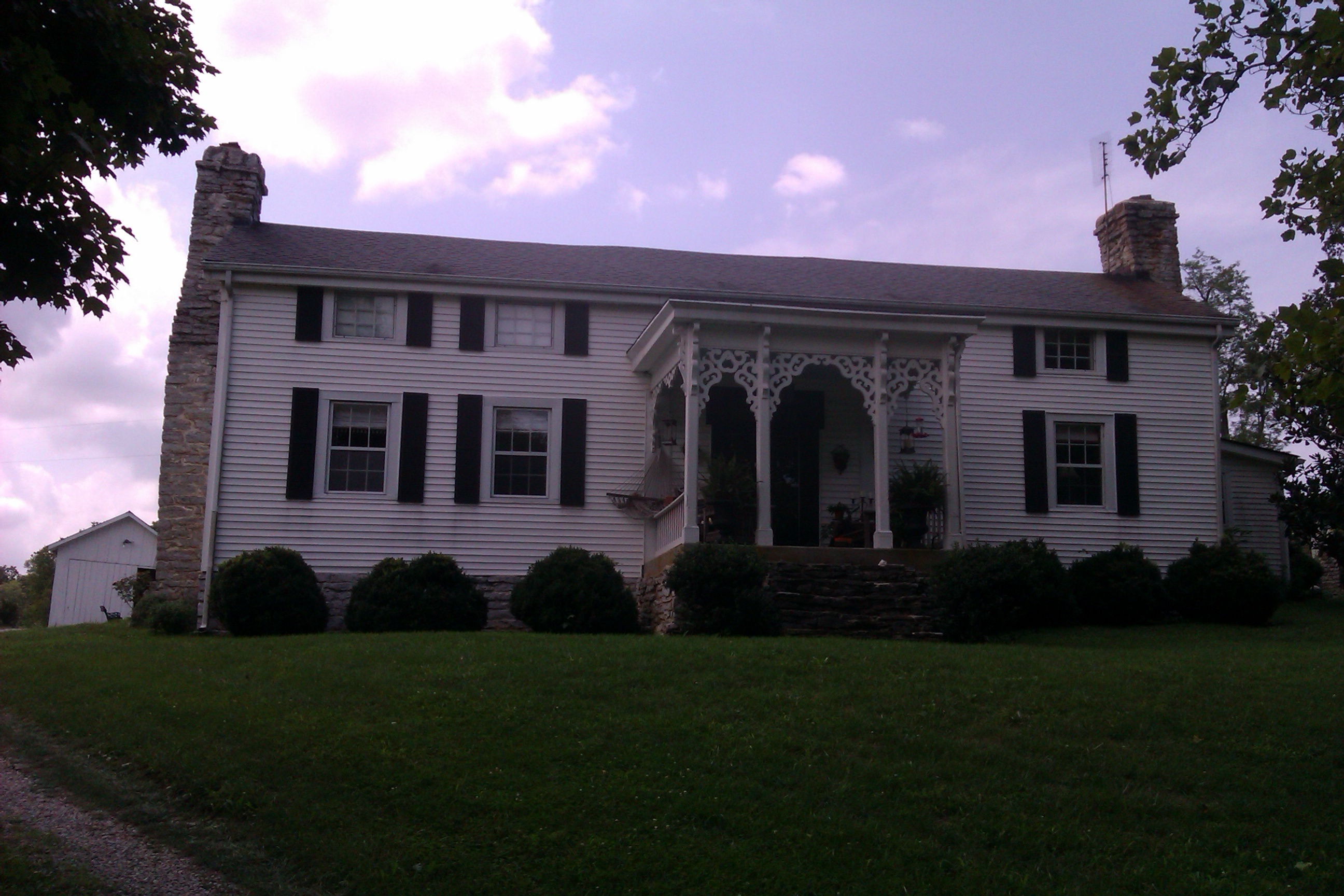

- Location within Kentucky Location within the United States
- Location: Bybee Rd. Winchester, Kentucky
- Coordinates: 37°54′55.6″N 84°11′04.2″W
- MPS: Clark County MRA
- NRHP reference No.: 79003570
- Added to NRHP: August 1, 1979

Bybee House is a historic building located south of Winchester, Kentucky, United States. The original part of the house was two rooms that were constructed of logs. A frame addition was added to the single-pen log core, creating a central-passage house. Log structures were prominent in this part of Clark County as the economy was much more modest than elsewhere. The 1¾-story structure features stone chimneys on the exterior and simple Greek Revival details on the interior. The house was listed on the National Register of Historic Places in 1979.
