= Tracy, Kentucky =

Unincorporated community in Kentucky, United States

Tracy
- Unincorporated community
- Location within the state of Kentucky Tracy (the United States)
- Coordinates: 36°47′53″N 85°58′14″W
- Country: United States
- State: Kentucky
- County: Barren
- Elevation: 850 ft (260 m)
- Time zone: UTC-6 (Central (CST))
  - Summer (DST): UTC-5 (CST)
- GNIS feature ID: 509226

Tracy is an unincorporated community in Barren County, Kentucky, United States. It is named for early settlers Isaac and Erasmus Tracy. Tracy had a post office from 1861 until 1965.
