= Cave City Commercial District =

Historic district in Kentucky, United States

- U.S. National Register of Historic Places
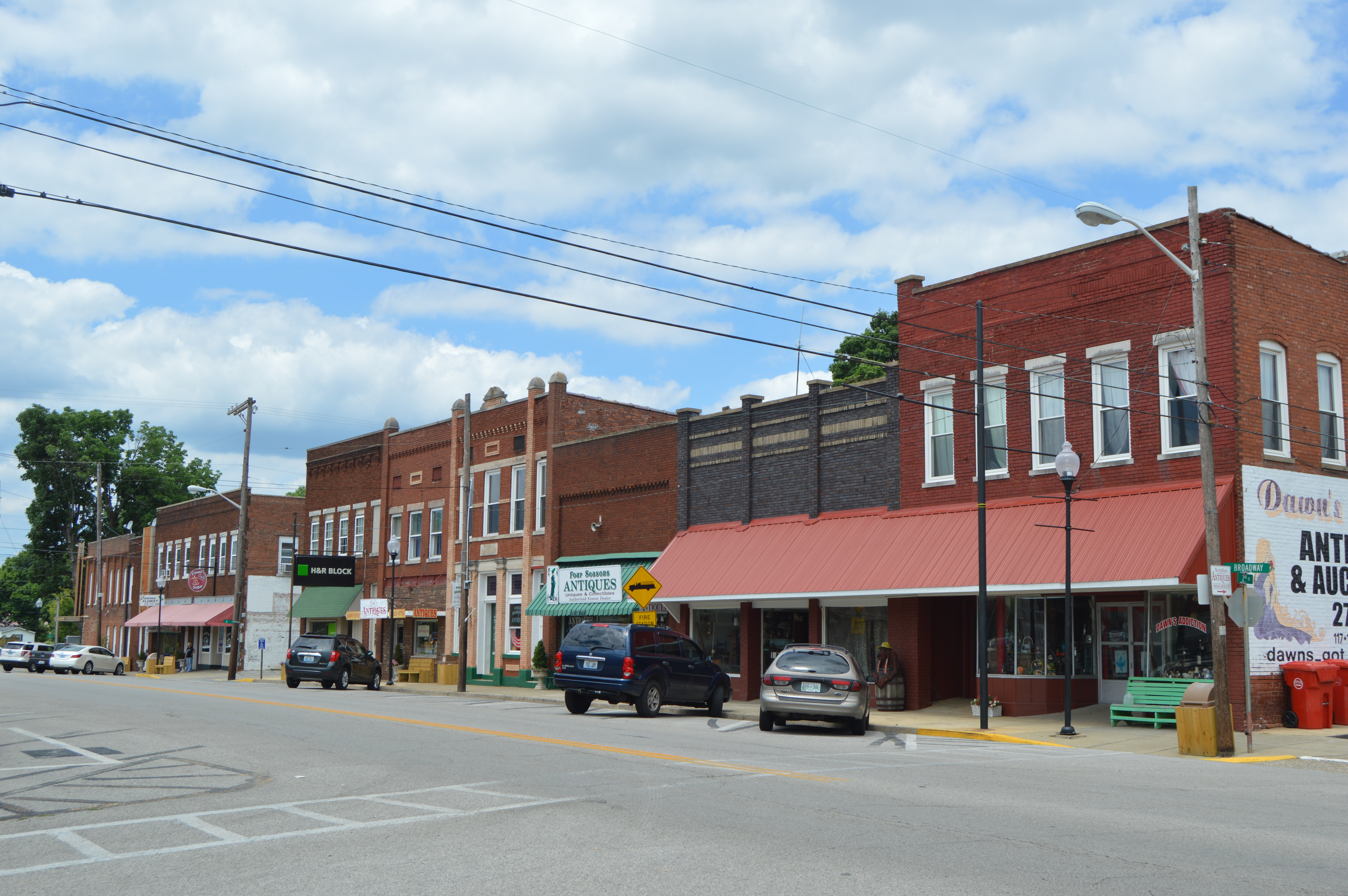

- Location within Kentucky Location within the United States
- Location: Broadway between 1st and 2nd Sts., Cave City, Kentucky
- Coordinates: 37°08′18″N 85°57′31″W
- Area: 3.5 acres (1.4 ha)
- MPS: Barren County MRA
- NRHP reference No.: 83002529
- Added to NRHP: July 20, 1983

The Cave City Commercial District, in Cave City, Kentucky, is a historic district which was listed on the National Register of Historic Places in 1983.

It is located along Broadway between 1st and 2nd Streets in Cave City. The district included 15 contributing buildings on 3.5 acres (1.4 ha).

According to its NRHP nomination, the district

has significance as being the last intact section of a once architecturally cohesive and thriving business area. While not extremely important individually, as a group these commercial buildings signify the important economic growth which Cave City experienced during the last half of the 19th century. Established in 1853, Cave City was a planned community, established primarily because of its proximity to the Mammoth Cave resort and the proposed Louisville and Nashville Railroad line. During that year four Louisville speculators purchased the land for the town site. By 1860 the population had grown to one hundred and fifty.

The district was deemed to have "significance as being the last intact section of a once architecturally cohesive and thriving business area. While not extremely important individually, as a group these commercial buildings signify the important economic growth which Cave City experienced during the last half of the 19th century."
