= Cooktown, Georgia =

Unincorporated community in Georgia, U.S.

Coordinates: 31°12′26″N 84°33′37″W

Cooktown is an unincorporated community in Miller County, in the U.S. state of Georgia.

== History ==
The first permanent settlement at Cooktown was made in 1883 by the Cook family, after whom the community was named.
