= Sturgeon, Kentucky =

Unincorporated community in Kentucky, United States

Sturgeon
- Unincorporated community
- Location within the state of Kentucky Sturgeon (the United States)
- Coordinates: 37°25′9″N 83°47′6″W
- Country: United States
- State: Kentucky
- County: Owsley
- Elevation: 909 ft (277 m)
- Time zone: UTC-5 (Eastern (EST))
  - Summer (DST): UTC-4 (EDT)
- GNIS feature ID: 515766

Sturgeon is an unincorporated community located in Owsley County, Kentucky, United States. Its post office closed in April 1966.
