= Goodnight, Kentucky =

Unincorporated community in Kentucky, United States

Goodnight
- Unincorporated community
- Location within the state of Kentucky Goodnight (the United States)
- Coordinates: 37°5′36″N 85°52′49″W
- Country: United States
- State: Kentucky
- County: Barren
- Elevation: 738 ft (225 m)
- Time zone: UTC-6 (Central (CST))
  - Summer (DST): UTC-5 (CST)
- GNIS feature ID: 508113

Goodnight is an unincorporated community in Barren County, Kentucky, United States.

== History ==
The community was named in honor of Isaac Goodnight, a member of the United States House of Representatives from Kentucky. During the American Civil War a teacher named Stephen Collier moved to Goodnight from Bear Wallow and opened a school called Mount Mary's Academy. Goodnight had a post office from 1898 to 1902.
