= Cooktown, Kentucky =

Unincorporated community in Kentucky, United States

Cooktown
- Unincorporated community
- Location within the state of Kentucky Cooktown (the United States)
- Coordinates: 36°50′5″N 85°56′27″W
- Country: United States
- State: Kentucky
- County: Barren
- Elevation: 787 ft (240 m)
- Time zone: UTC-6 (Central (CST))
  - Summer (DST): UTC-5 (CST)
- GNIS feature ID: 507749

Cooktown is an unincorporated community in Barren County, Kentucky, United States.
