= Bristletown, Kentucky =

Unincorporated community in Kentucky, United States

Bristletown
- Unincorporated community
- Location within the state of Kentucky Bristletown (the United States)
- Coordinates: 36°56′3″N 85°55′10″W
- Country: United States
- State: Kentucky
- County: Barren
- Elevation: 702 ft (214 m)
- Time zone: UTC-6 (Central (CST))
  - Summer (DST): UTC-5 (CST)
- GNIS feature ID: 507585

Bristletown is an unincorporated community in Barren County, Kentucky, United States. Bristletown had a post office from 1898 to 1906.
