= Oil City, Kentucky =

Unincorporated community in Kentucky, United States

Oil City
- Unincorporated community
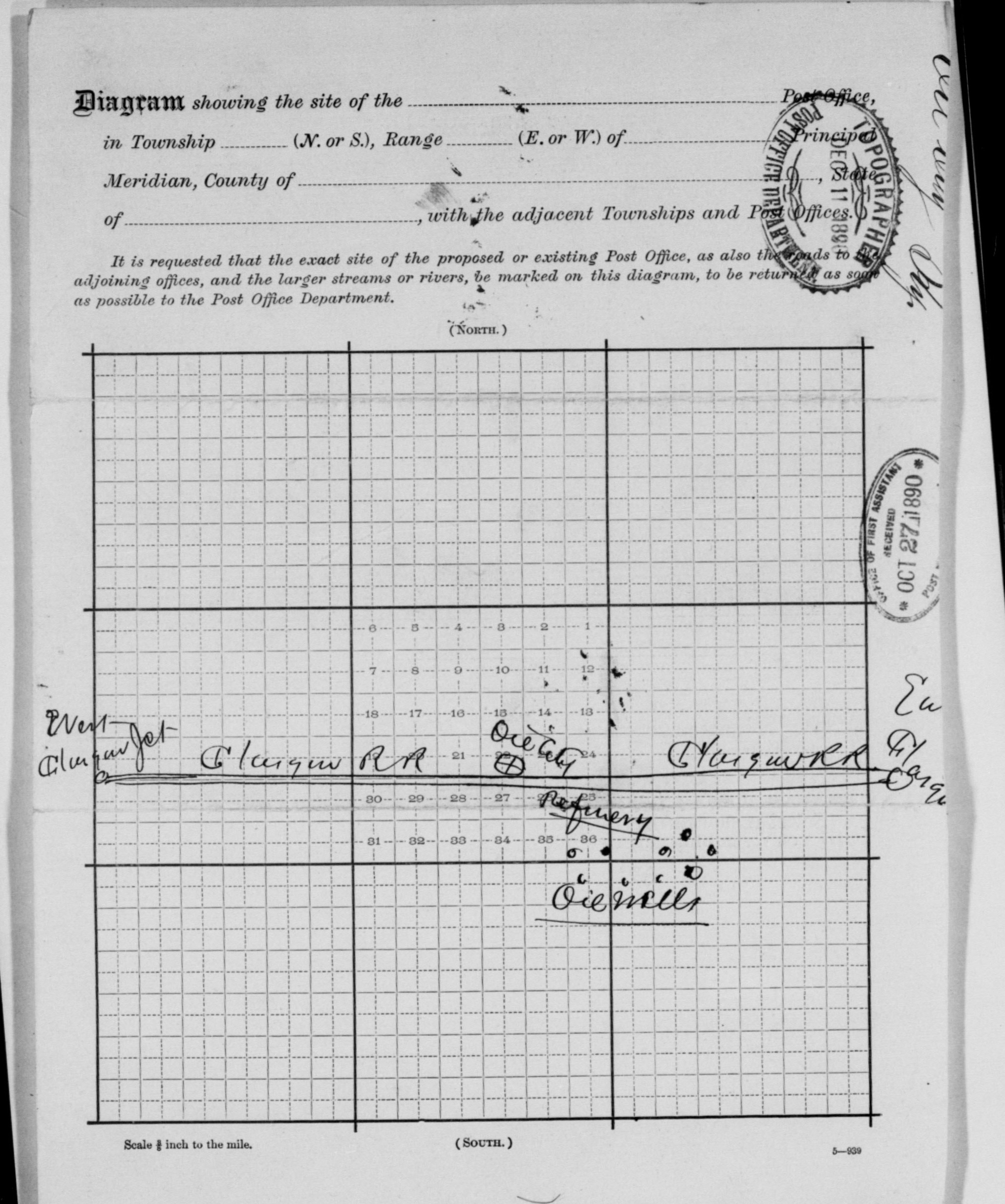
- Oil City, Barren County, Kentucky, United States 1890

- Location within the state of Kentucky Oil City (the United States)
- Coordinates: 37°2′0″N 85°58′59″W
- Country: United States
- State: Kentucky
- County: Barren
- Elevation: 646 ft (197 m)
- Time zone: UTC-6 (Central (CST))
  - Summer (DST): UTC-5 (CST)
- GNIS feature ID: 508736

Oil City is an unincorporated community in Barren County, Kentucky, United States.

== History ==
Oil City Is so named, because it was a shipping point for oil drilled nearby, presumably in what is called the Oil City Pool. There was a post office at Oil City from 1890 to 1909. By 1968 there was one building left at the settlement.
