= Kidds Store, Kentucky =

- Unincorporated community
- Location within Kentucky
- Coordinates: 37.41452°N 84.85384°W
- Country: United States
- State: Kentucky
- County: Casey
- Elevation: 902 ft (275 m)
- Time zone: UTC-5 (Eastern (EST))
  - Summer (DST): UTC-4 (EDT)
- Area code: 606
- GNIS feature ID: 495719

Kidds Store is an unincorporated community in extreme northeastern Casey County, in the U.S. state of Kentucky near the intersection of KY 906 and U.S. Route 127.

== History ==
Kidds Store was named after the community's first postmaster, Elias Kidd. Kidd also ran a store and gristmill in the area. The post office operated from 1887 to 1954.
