= Peach Orchard, Kentucky =

Unincorporated community in Kentucky, United States

- Unincorporated community
- Location in Kentucky Location in the United States
- Coordinates: 37°56′31″N 82°36′55″W
- Country: United States
- State: Kentucky
- County: Lawrence
- Elevation: 604 ft (184 m)
- Time zone: UTC-6 (Central (CST))
  - Summer (DST): UTC-5 (CST)
- GNIS feature ID: 508786

Peach Orchard is an unincorporated community and coal town in Lawrence County, Kentucky, United States. Their post office no longer exists. It was also known as Mellensburg.
