= Slick Rock, Kentucky =

Unincorporated community in Kentucky, United States

Slick Rock
- Unincorporated community
- Location within the state of Kentucky Slick Rock (the United States)
- Coordinates: 37°0′21″N 85°47′53″W
- Country: United States
- State: Kentucky
- County: Barren
- Elevation: 745 ft (227 m)
- Time zone: UTC-6 (Central (CST))
  - Summer (DST): UTC-5 (CST)
- GNIS feature ID: 509076

Slick Rock is an unincorporated community in Barren County, Kentucky, United States.

== History ==
The community was said to be a "health resort" at one time. Slick Rock had a post office from 1867 until 1940.
