= Finney, Kentucky =

Unincorporated community in Kentucky, United States

Finney
- Unincorporated community
- Location within the state of Kentucky Finney (the United States)
- Country: United States
- State: Kentucky
- County: Barren
- GNIS feature ID: 492085

Finney is an unincorporated community in Barren County, Kentucky, United States.

== History ==
A post office was established in the community in 1898 and named for the local Finney family. The settlement was originally known as Grangetown because it was the meeting place for the local Grangers. The post office closed in 1955.
