= Beckton, Kentucky =

Unincorporated community in Kentucky, United States

Beckton
- Unincorporated community
- Location within the state of Kentucky Beckton (the United States)
- Coordinates: 36°59′3″N 86°2′11″W
- Country: United States
- State: Kentucky
- County: Barren
- Elevation: 751 ft (229 m)
- Time zone: UTC-6 (Central (CST))
  - Summer (DST): UTC-5 (CST)
- GNIS feature ID: 486648

Beckton is an unincorporated community in Barren County, Kentucky, United States. It is named for James B. Beck. Beckton had a post office from 1883 to 1903.
