= Barren County, Kentucky =

County in Kentucky, United States

- County
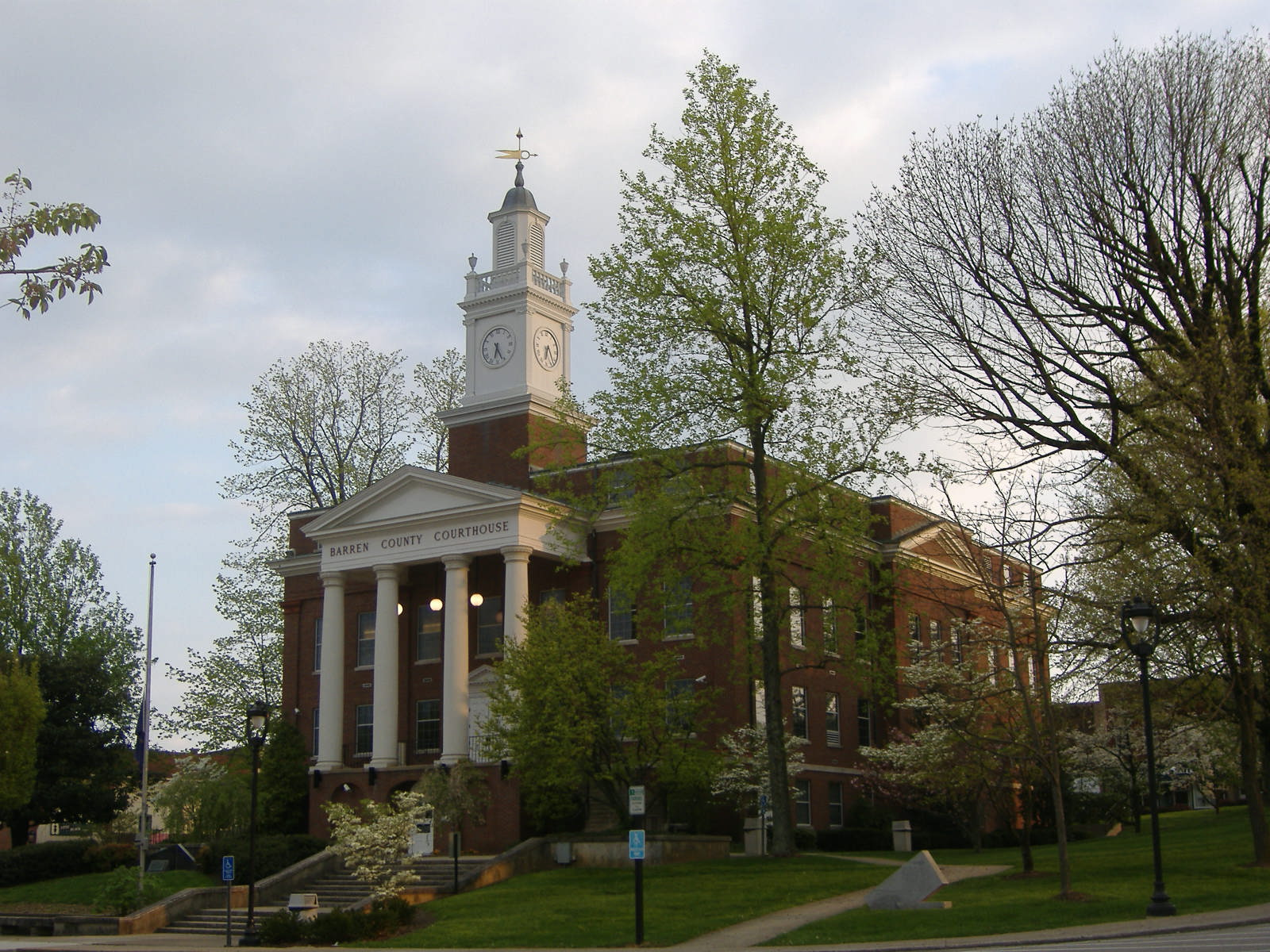
- Barren County Courthouse in Glasgow

- Location within the U.S. state of Kentucky
- Coordinates: 36°58′N 85°56′W
- Country: United States
- State: Kentucky
- Founded: 1798
- Named for: The Barrens, a region of grassland in Kentucky
- Seat: Glasgow
- Largest city: Glasgow

Government
  - Judge/Executive: Jaime Bewley Byrd (R)

Area
  - Total: 500 sq mi (1,300 km^{2})
  - Land: 488 sq mi (1,260 km^{2})
  - Water: 12 sq mi (31 km^{2}) 2.5%

Population (2020)
  - Total: 44,485
  - Estimate (2025): 45,641 ▲
  - Density: 87/sq mi (34/km^{2})
- Time zone: UTC−6 (Central)
  - Summer (DST): UTC−5 (CDT)
- Congressional district: 2nd
- Website: barrencounty.ky.gov

Barren County is a county located in the south-central portion of the U.S. state of Kentucky. As of the 2020 census, the population was 44,485. Its county seat is Glasgow. The county was founded on December 20, 1798, from parts of Warren and Green Counties. It was named for the Barrens, meadowlands that cover the northern third, though actually the soil is fertile. Barren County is part of the Glasgow, KY Micropolitan Statistical Area, which is also included in the Bowling Green-Glasgow, KY Combined Statistical Area. In 2007 Barren County was named the "Best Place to Live in Rural America" by Progressive Farmer Magazine.

== History ==
Barren County was established in 1798 from land taken from Green County and Warren County. Six courthouses have served the county throughout its history, the first built of logs.

Barren County, like most of south-central Kentucky, was settled by the Scots-Irish, and still bears many cultural aspects that trace back to that heritage. The Scottish heritage is the most evident, as indicated, by the name of the county seat, which is named for Glasgow, Scotland, and is celebrated annually with the Glasgow Highland Games, one of three highland games held each year in Kentucky.

Barren was a prohibition or dry county, until voters overturned that in September 2016. Prior to that, there were two exceptions:

- Cave City, which voted in 2005 to become "moist" (selling only alcohol by the drink in restaurants of a certain minimum size (100 in this case) and which derive 70% or more of their revenue from food), and later voted in 2014 to approve full package sales.
- Glasgow, which approved liquor by the drink under the same restrictions on November 6, 2007, after three previous elections to allow full alcohol sales in the city were soundly defeated.

== Geography ==
According to the United States Census Bureau, the county has a total area of 500 square miles (1,300 km^{2}), of which 488 square miles (1,260 km^{2}) is land and 12 square miles (31 km^{2}) (2.5%) is water.

Barren River Lake is located in the southern part of the county, forming part of its boundary with Allen County. Barren River Lake State Resort Park is located primarily within Barren County, along the lake's shoreline.

=== Adjacent counties ===
- Hart County (north)
- Metcalfe County (east)
- Monroe County (southeast)
- Allen County (southwest)
- Warren County (west)
- Edmonson County (northwest)

=== National protected area ===
- Mammoth Cave National Park (part)

== Demographics ==
Historical population
Census	Pop.	Note	%±
1800	4,784		—
1810	11,286		135.9%
1820	10,328		−8.5%
1830	15,079		46.0%
1840	17,288		14.6%
1850	20,240		17.1%
1860	16,665		−17.7%
1870	17,780		6.7%
1880	22,321		25.5%
1890	21,490		−3.7%
1900	23,197		7.9%
1910	25,293		9.0%
1920	25,356		0.2%
1930	25,844		1.9%
1940	27,559		6.6%
1950	28,461		3.3%
1960	28,303		−0.6%
1970	28,677		1.3%
1980	34,009		18.6%
1990	34,001		0.0%
2000	38,033		11.9%
2010	42,173		10.9%
2020	44,485		5.5%
2025 (est.)	45,641	▲	2.6%
U.S. Decennial Census; 1790-1960 1900-1990; 1990-2000 2010-2020

=== 2020 census ===
As of the 2020 census, the county had a population of 44,485. The median age was 40.7 years. 24.0% of residents were under the age of 18 and 18.4% of residents were 65 years of age or older. For every 100 females there were 93.8 males, and for every 100 females age 18 and over there were 91.2 males age 18 and over.

The racial makeup of the county was 88.3% White, 3.9% Black or African American, 0.3% American Indian and Alaska Native, 0.6% Asian, 0.1% Native Hawaiian and Pacific Islander, 1.8% from some other race, and 5.0% from two or more races. Hispanic or Latino residents of any race comprised 4.2% of the population.

37.9% of residents lived in urban areas, while 62.1% lived in rural areas.

There were 17,718 households in the county, of which 31.2% had children under the age of 18 living with them and 26.9% had a female householder with no spouse or partner present. About 27.4% of all households were made up of individuals and 12.7% had someone living alone who was 65 years of age or older.

There were 19,794 housing units, of which 10.5% were vacant. Among occupied housing units, 65.3% were owner-occupied and 34.7% were renter-occupied. The homeowner vacancy rate was 1.9% and the rental vacancy rate was 8.6%.

=== 2000 census ===
As of the census of 2000, there were 38,033 people, 15,346 households, and 10,941 families residing in the county. The population density was 78 per square mile (30/km^{2}). There were 17,095 housing units at an average density of 35 per square mile (14/km^{2}). The racial makeup of the county was 94.30% White, 4.09% Black or African American, 0.15% Native American, 0.41% Asian, 0.03% Pacific Islander, 0.38% from other races, and 0.65% from two or more races. 0.93% of the population were Hispanic or Latino of any race.

There were 15,346 households, out of which 31.70% had children under the age of 18 living with them, 58.30% were married couples living together, 9.80% had a female householder with no husband present, and 28.70% were non-families. 25.60% of all households were made up of individuals, and 11.60% had someone living alone who was 65 years of age or older. The average household size was 2.44 and the average family size was 2.91.

The age distribution was 24.20% under the age of 18, 8.20% from 18 to 24, 28.80% from 25 to 44, 23.80% from 45 to 64, and 15.00% who were 65 years of age or older. The median age was 38 years. For every 100 females, there were 92.70 males. For every 100 females age 18 and over, there were 89.30 males.

The median income for a household in the county was $31,240, and the median income for a family was $37,231. Males had a median income of $29,860 versus $21,208 for females. The per capita income for the county was $16,816. About 11.80% of families and 15.60% of the population were below the poverty line, including 20.30% of those under age 18 and 19.10% of those age 65 or over.

=== Religion ===
Christianity is the predominant religion in the county. The Southern Baptist Convention is the leading Protestant denomination in terms of adherents, with Glasgow Baptist Church being the largest congregation in the county. Missionary Baptist, United Methodist, Free Methodist, Presbyterian (including Cumberland Presbyterian), Episcopalian, Disciples of Christ, Churches of Christ including non-institutional, Assemblies of God, and numerous independent churches are located in the county, as well as two Roman Catholic parishes, an LDS ward, and a sizable Amish community.

== Economy ==
Barren County is primarily rural in nature, with agriculture as the primary industry. Glasgow, the county seat, has numerous manufacturing facilities, and is also a medical and retail hub for the area. Cave City is also a popular lodging area for tourists visiting nearby Mammoth Cave National Park.

Barren County's industry includes these companies:

- Walmart of Glasgow - Walmart operates a full-service super center at the intersection of Kentucky Route 90 (Happy Valley Road) and Veterans Outer Loop on the northwest outskirts of the city.
- Mid-State Recycling - the area's main recycling facility.
- Western Kentucky University's satellite campus in Glasgow, Kentucky
- Glasgow Electric Plant Board - Electric, cable television, and internet service in the City of Glasgow.
- Farmers Rural Electric Cooperative - Electric service for the county.
- South Central Rural Telephone Cooperative - telephone, cable television and internet service.
- T.J. Samson Community Hospital
- Southern States Feed Mill in Park City
- Dakota Elmore Realty and Auction Co.

In February 2026, Kingspan Group PLC, parent company of Tate, a data center infrastructure company announced a $76 million investment, first presented in October 2025, to open its largest North American manufacturing plant in Glasgow. The project is expected to create 400 new full-time manufacturing jobs once the 764,000-square-foot facility is fully operational. This is the largest job creation announcement in Barren County in nearly two decades.

== Politics ==
United States presidential election results for Barren County, Kentucky
Year	Republican		Democratic		Third party(ies)	
Year	No.	%	No.	%	No.	%
1912	1,563	29.30%	2,993	56.10%	779	14.60%
1916	2,462	41.81%	3,370	57.24%	56	0.95%
1920	3,972	41.67%	5,499	57.70%	60	0.63%
1924	3,488	43.48%	4,449	55.46%	85	1.06%
1928	5,101	59.07%	3,530	40.88%	5	0.06%
1932	3,622	35.58%	6,518	64.02%	41	0.40%
1936	3,352	39.37%	5,137	60.34%	25	0.29%
1940	3,233	39.76%	4,888	60.11%	11	0.14%
1944	3,262	42.36%	4,439	57.64%	0	0.00%
1948	2,437	35.33%	4,095	59.37%	366	5.31%
1952	3,743	44.75%	4,618	55.21%	4	0.05%
1956	4,206	44.68%	5,206	55.30%	2	0.02%
1960	5,187	51.19%	4,946	48.81%	0	0.00%
1964	2,936	31.30%	6,420	68.44%	24	0.26%
1968	4,209	42.84%	3,464	35.25%	2,153	21.91%
1972	6,070	62.60%	3,384	34.90%	242	2.50%
1976	3,797	38.86%	5,878	60.16%	96	0.98%
1980	6,405	53.67%	5,285	44.29%	243	2.04%
1984	7,717	62.86%	4,503	36.68%	57	0.46%
1988	6,653	57.82%	4,799	41.71%	54	0.47%
1992	5,467	42.14%	5,688	43.84%	1,818	14.01%
1996	5,700	48.13%	5,044	42.59%	1,100	9.29%
2000	8,741	63.14%	4,930	35.61%	173	1.25%
2004	10,822	67.05%	5,216	32.32%	102	0.63%
2008	11,133	66.24%	5,434	32.33%	240	1.43%
2012	10,922	65.92%	5,400	32.59%	246	1.48%
2016	13,483	72.93%	4,275	23.12%	730	3.95%
2020	14,654	73.04%	5,127	25.55%	283	1.41%
2024	15,019	75.85%	4,565	23.05%	218	1.10%

The Republican Party has the most registered voters. The county hasn't voted for the Democratic presidential candidate since 1992. 51% of the voters are registered to the Republican Party, and 40% are registered Democrats.

=== Elected officials ===
Elected officials as of January 3, 2025
U.S. House	Brett Guthrie (R)	KY 2
Ky. Senate	David P. Givens (R)	9
Ky. House	Steve Riley (R)	23

=== Voter registration ===
Barren County Voter Registration & Party Enrollment as of April 26, 2024
Political Party	Total Voters	Percentage
Democratic	12,888	40.08
Republican	16,538	51.44
Others	1,178	3.66
Independent	1,387	4.31
Libertarian	130	0.40
Green	16	0.05
Reform	2	0.01
Constitution	10	0.03
Total	32,153	100%

=== Statewide elections ===
Previous gubernatorial elections results
Year	Republican	Democratic	Third parties
2023	58.21% 6,918	41.78% 4,965	0.01% 1
2019	58.15% 7,693	39.91% 5,280	1.94% 256
2015	57.40% 5,289	38.72% 3,568	3.88% 358
2011	38.22% 3,003	56.31% 4,425	5.47% 430
2007	47.41% 5,279	52.59% 5,856	0.00% 0
2003	56.53% 5,065	43.47% 3,895	0.00% 0
1999	17.33% 598	75.83% 2,616	6.84% 236
1995	45.38% 3,882	54.62% 4,672	0.00% 0

== Education ==
The county is home to all or part of three school districts:

- Most of the county is served by the Barren County Schools, which includes Barren County High School and Middle School in Glasgow, and seven elementary schools throughout the county, many of which were formerly also high schools before they were consolidated into Barren County High in the early 1970s.
- The Glasgow Independent Schools serve the city of Glasgow proper, with small areas of overlap outside the city limits. The district includes Glasgow High School, Glasgow Middle School, and two elementary schools. In addition, the Glasgow and Caverna (see below) districts jointly operate an alternative school located in the Glasgow district for "at-risk" children in middle and high school. Barren County High and Middle Schools, although operated by the county district, are actually located within the boundaries of the Glasgow district.
- The Caverna Independent Schools take in Cave City and surrounding northwest Barren County, as well as Horse Cave and the southwest corner of neighboring Hart County. It is served by Caverna High School, Caverna Middle School, and Caverna Elementary School, all located between Cave City and Horse Cave. The high school is on the Hart County side of the line, while the elementary and middle schools share a campus on the Barren County side. The district is one of only a handful in the United States which is located in more than one county. Three other districts with this distinction are in Kentucky, most notably the Corbin Independent School District, serving a single city split by a county line.

== Transportation ==
Barren County is served by Interstate 65, which goes through the northwest part of the county, and the Cumberland Expressway, a former toll road that was designated to be part of the future Interstate 66 corridor before that project was scrapped. U.S. Routes 31E, 31W, and 68 also pass through the county.

Railroad service is provided by CSX Transportation, whose former Louisville and Nashville Railroad main line passes through Cave City and Park City. The Glasgow Railway Company is a short line which owns a branch from Park City (which was formerly called Glasgow Junction) to Glasgow; the line is serviced via an operating lease by CSX.

Glasgow Transit operates deviated fixed-route bus service within Glasgow on weekdays.

== Communities ==
=== Cities ===
- Cave City
- Glasgow (county seat)
- Park City

=== Census-designated place ===
- Hiseville

=== Other unincorporated communities ===
- Apple Grove
- Austin
- Bear Wallow
- Beckton
- Bon Ayr
- Bristletown
- Carden
- Cooktown
- Coral Hill
- Dry Fork
- Eighty Eight
- Etoile
- Finney
- Goodnight
- Griderville
- Haywood
- Highland Springs
- Kino
- Lecta
- Lucas
- Merry Oaks
- Nobob
- Oil City
- Park
- Peter Creek
- Pritchardsville
- Railton
- Red Cross
- Rocky Hill
- Roseville
- Slick Rock
- Stovall
- Temple Hill
- Tracy

=== Ghost town ===
- Chaumont (mostly in Edmonson County)

== Media ==
- WLYE-FM "Willie 94.1" - Real Country Glasgow
- WCLU-AM 1490 Glasgow
- WLLI "Willie 94.1" Glasgow (licensed to Munfordville)
- WCDS-AM 1230 "SportsRadio 123" - Newberry Broadcasting, Inc.
- W239BV (FM 95.7) - "96 Hits" - an analog radio repeater of WOVO-HD2/Horse Cave
- Glasgow Daily Times - local newspaper published Tuesday through Saturday
- Barren County Progress - county-oriented weekly newspaper published Thursdays

== Tourism ==
Cave City's main industry in Barren County's economy is tourism, thanks to its proximity to Mammoth Cave National Park, which is one of the top ten most visited attractions in Kentucky. A number of motels and restaurants are located at the interchange of Interstate 65 and state routes 70 and 90, which cater to tourists visiting the area or just passing through, thereby making Cave City, and much of northwest Barren County, a tourism hot-spot. The city operates a small convention center that is popular with church groups and other family-related organizations, mainly because of the area's lack of crime and abundance of tourist attractions. Cave City has long been a gateway to Mammoth Cave; in the era of passenger rail travel, trains of the Louisville and Nashville Railroad would discharge tourists there, who would then be shuttled to the cave. The agricultural industry is also a big factor in the area's economy. For more information, see the Barren County Economic Authority's website (www.BarrenCoEa.com).

== Sites and events of interest ==
- Fort Williams, Glasgow.
- Barren River Lake State Resort Park, Lucas at the junction of US 31E and KY 87 in southern Barren County.
- Barren River Lake, a lake along the Barren-Allen County line that is operated by the U.S. Army Corps of Engineers.
- Kentucky Action Park/Jesse James Riding Stables, Cave City, Kentucky
- Guntown Mountain Old West town and Haunted Hotel, Cave City
- Diamond Caverns, Park City, along the Edmonson-Barren County line on the southeastern fringe of Mammoth Cave National Park.
- Onyx Cave and Rock Shop, Cave City
- Thomerson Park, Dry Fork

Events include, but are not limited to, the following:

- The 400-mile yard sale along US 68 throughout the route's course in Kentucky (except Metro Lexington and the LBL) - first Thursday-Sunday in June, annually.
- Glasgow Highland Games at Barren River Lake State Resort Park - early June.
- Annual Roller Coaster Yard Sale along State Highway 63 - early October.
- Annual Fireworks Extravaganza at Barren River Lake, July 4 of each year.

== Notable people ==
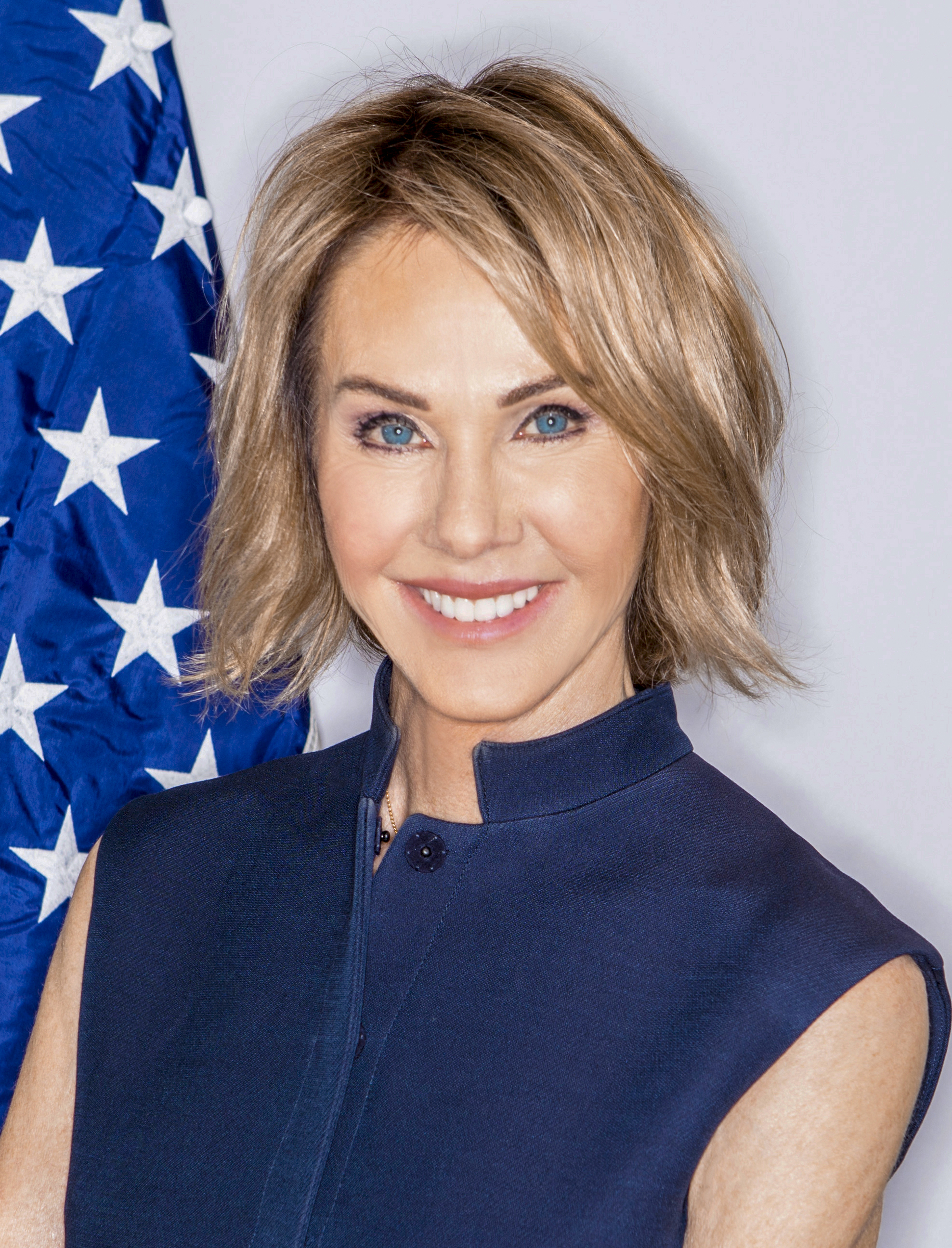
Kelly Craft

- Walter Arnold Baker (1937–2010) : Associate Justice, Kentucky Supreme Court, Assistant General Counsel for International Affairs in the Department of Defense, Member of Kentucky Senate and House of Representatives, Lieutenant Colonel, Kentucky Air National Guard.
- Ira F. M. Butler (1812–1909), Oregon pioneer and state legislator
- Floyd Collins (1887–1925), cave explorer and cave accident victim
- Kelly Craft (née Guilfoil) (born 1962), US Ambassador to the United Nations and US Ambassador to Canada
- Nancy Kelsey (1823–1896), the "Betsy Ross of California
- Louie B. Nunn (1924–2004), former governor of Kentucky
- Marion McCarrell Scott (1843–1922), educator and government advisor in Meiji period Japan
- Henry Skaggs (1724–1810), longhunter, explorer, and pioneer, lived in Hiseville
- Luska Twyman (1913–1988), first African American mayor of Glasgow, Kentucky
- William Burton Walbert (1886–1959), Southern gospel songwriter, singer, composer, and editor

== See also ==
- National Register of Historic Places listings in Barren County, Kentucky
