= Hiseville, Kentucky =

Unincorporated community in Kentucky, United States

- Census-designated place (CDP)
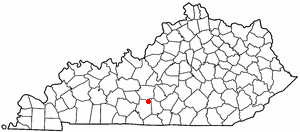
- Location of Hiseville, Kentucky
- Coordinates: 37°6′0″N 85°48′54″W
- Country: United States
- State: Kentucky
- County: Barren

Area
  - Total: 0.74 sq mi (1.92 km^{2})
  - Land: 0.73 sq mi (1.89 km^{2})
  - Water: 0.012 sq mi (0.03 km^{2})
- Elevation: 702 ft (214 m)

Population (2020)
  - Total: 246
  - Density: 337.1/sq mi (130.15/km^{2})
- Time zone: UTC-6 (Central (CST))
  - Summer (DST): UTC-5 (CDT)
- ZIP code: 42152
- Area codes: 270 & 364
- FIPS code: 21-37234
- GNIS feature ID: 0494308

Hiseville is an unincorporated community and census-designated place (CDP) in Barren County, Kentucky, United States. The population was 246 at the 2020 census. It is part of the Glasgow Micropolitan Statistical Area. Hiseville was a city until it disincorporated in 2004.

== Geography ==
Hiseville is located at 37°6′0″N 85°48′54″W (37.100131, -85.815107).

According to the United States Census Bureau, the city had a total area of 0.7 square miles (1.8 km^{2}), all of it land.

== History ==
A post office was established in the community in 1867, when it was named in honor of Congressman Elijah Hise. It was known previously as Goosehorn.

== Demographics ==
Historical population
Census	Pop.	Note	%±
1990	2,794		—
2000	224		−92.0%
2010	240		7.1%
2020	246		2.5%
U.S. Decennial Census

As of the census of 2000, there were 224 people, 94 households, and 67 families residing in the city. The population density was 302.7 inhabitants per square mile (116.9/km^{2}). There were 100 housing units at an average density of 135.1 per square mile (52.2/km^{2}). The racial makeup of the city was 99.11% White, 0.45% African American, and 0.45% from two or more races.

There were 94 households, out of which 31.9% had children under the age of 18 living with them, 57.4% were married couples living together, 10.6% had a female householder with no husband present, and 28.7% were non-families. 27.7% of all households were made up of individuals, and 17.0% had someone living alone who was 65 years of age or older. The average household size was 2.38 and the average family size was 2.87.

In the city the population was spread out, with 25.4% under the age of 18, 4.9% from 18 to 24, 29.5% from 25 to 44, 24.6% from 45 to 64, and 15.6% who were 65 years of age or older. The median age was 38 years. For every 100 females, there were 98.2 males. For every 100 females age 18 and over, there were 85.6 males.

The median income for a household in the city was $24,167, and the median income for a family was $28,750. Males had a median income of $21,563 versus $20,625 for females. The per capita income for the city was $15,267. About 12.5% of families and 13.2% of the population were below the poverty line, including 12.5% of those under the age of eighteen and 23.8% of those 65 or over.

== Notable residents ==
- Luska Twyman, born in Hiseville, was the first African American mayor of Glasgow, Kentucky
- Louie B. Nunn, former governor of Kentucky was born north of Hiseville, KY.
- Henry Skaggs, famed Kentucky longhunter and pioneer, lived here from 1801. His gravesite is in the Hiseville-Park community.
- Jim Newberry, former mayor of Lexington, KY, was born and raised in Hiseville, KY.
