= Kentucky's 23rd House of Representatives district =

American legislative district

Kentucky's 23rd State House of Representatives district
Representative
Steve Riley; R–Glasgow
since January 1, 2017
- Registration: 52.6% Republican; 38.6% Democratic; 8.3% No party preference
- Demographics: 88.1% White; 3.7% Black; 4.3% Hispanic; 0.8% Asian; 0.4% Other; 2.8% Multiracial
- Population (2023): 44,670
- Registered voters (2025): 32,670

Kentucky's 23rd House of Representatives district is one of 100 districts in the Kentucky House of Representatives. Located in the southern part of the state, it comprises Barren County. It has been represented by Steve Riley (R–Glasgow) since 2017. As of 2023, the district had a population of 44,670.

== Voter registration ==
On January 1, 2025, the district had 32,670 registered voters, who were registered with the following parties.

Party	Registration	
Party	Voters	%
Republican	17,195	52.63
Democratic	12,595	38.55
Independent	1,473	4.51
Libertarian	140	0.43
Green	15	0.05
Constitution	9	0.03
Socialist Workers	5	0.02
Reform	2	0.01
"Other"	1,236	3.78
Total	32,670	100.00
Source: Kentucky State Board of Elections

== List of members representing the district ==
Member	Party	Years	Electoral history	District location
Walter Arnold Baker (Glasgow)	Republican	January 1, 1968 – January 1, 1972	Elected in 1967. Reelected in 1969. Retired to run for the Kentucky Senate.	1964–1972; Barren County.
Bobby H. Richardson (Glasgow)	Democratic	January 1, 1972 – January 1, 1991	Elected in 1971. Reelected in 1973. Reelected in 1975. Reelected in 1977. Reelected in 1979. Reelected in 1981. Reelected in 1984. Reelected in 1986. Reelected in 1988. Retired.	1972–1974; Barren and Metcalfe (part) Counties.
Bobby H. Richardson (Glasgow)	Democratic	January 1, 1972 – January 1, 1991	Elected in 1971. Reelected in 1973. Reelected in 1975. Reelected in 1977. Reelected in 1979. Reelected in 1981. Reelected in 1984. Reelected in 1986. Reelected in 1988. Retired.	1974–1985; Barren and Metcalfe (part) Counties.
Bobby H. Richardson (Glasgow)	Democratic	January 1, 1972 – January 1, 1991	Elected in 1971. Reelected in 1973. Reelected in 1975. Reelected in 1977. Reelected in 1979. Reelected in 1981. Reelected in 1984. Reelected in 1986. Reelected in 1988. Retired.	1985–1993; Barren and Metcalfe (part) Counties.
Steve Nunn (Glasgow)	Republican	January 1, 1991 – January 1, 2007	Elected in 1990. Reelected in 1992. Reelected in 1994. Reelected in 1996. Reelected in 1998. Reelected in 2000. Reelected in 2002. Reelected in 2004. Lost reelection.	1985–1993; Barren and Metcalfe (part) Counties.
Steve Nunn (Glasgow)	Republican	January 1, 1991 – January 1, 2007	Elected in 1990. Reelected in 1992. Reelected in 1994. Reelected in 1996. Reelected in 1998. Reelected in 2000. Reelected in 2002. Reelected in 2004. Lost reelection.	1993–1997; Barren and Metcalfe (part) Counties.
Steve Nunn (Glasgow)	Republican	January 1, 1991 – January 1, 2007	Elected in 1990. Reelected in 1992. Reelected in 1994. Reelected in 1996. Reelected in 1998. Reelected in 2000. Reelected in 2002. Reelected in 2004. Lost reelection.	1997–2003
Steve Nunn (Glasgow)	Republican	January 1, 1991 – January 1, 2007	Elected in 1990. Reelected in 1992. Reelected in 1994. Reelected in 1996. Reelected in 1998. Reelected in 2000. Reelected in 2002. Reelected in 2004. Lost reelection.	2003–2015
Johnny Bell (Glasgow)	Democratic	January 1, 2007 – January 1, 2017	Elected in 2006. Reelected in 2008. Reelected in 2010. Reelected in 2012. Reelected in 2014. Retired.	2003–2015
Johnny Bell (Glasgow)	Democratic	January 1, 2007 – January 1, 2017	Elected in 2006. Reelected in 2008. Reelected in 2010. Reelected in 2012. Reelected in 2014. Retired.	2015–2023
Steve Riley (Glasgow)	Republican	January 1, 2017 – present	Elected in 2016. Reelected in 2018. Reelected in 2020. Reelected in 2022. Reelected in 2024. Reelected in 2026.	2015–2023
Steve Riley (Glasgow)	Republican	January 1, 2017 – present	Elected in 2016. Reelected in 2018. Reelected in 2020. Reelected in 2022. Reelected in 2024. Reelected in 2026.	2023–present
