= Glasgow High School (Kentucky) =

Location
- 1601 Columbia Avenue; Glasgow, (Barren County), Kentucky 42141; United States; 37°0′31.91″N 85°53′17.54″W

Information
- School type: Public, high school
- Established: 1915; 111 years ago
- School district: Glasgow Independent Schools
- Principal: Joey Norman
- Teaching staff: 37.95 (FTE)
- Grades: 9–12
- Enrollment: 612 (2023–2024)
- Student to teacher ratio: 16.13
- Colors: Blue; White
- Athletics conference: Kentucky High School Athletic Association
- Nickname: Scotties and Lady Scotties
- Feeder schools: Glasgow Middle School
- Website: ghs.glasgow.kyschools.us

Glasgow High School is a public high school (grades 9 to 12) in the city of Glasgow, Barren County, Kentucky. It is the only public high school for Glasgow Independent Schools; however, Barren County High School, which is part of Barren County Schools, also lies within the city limits, and in fact lies physically within the boundaries of the Glasgow district. GHS celebrated its 100th commencement upon the graduation of the Class of 2015. 64 African-American students were transferred to GHS in 1964 once the school board could no longer justify funding the Ralph Bunche School as surrounding schools integrated before the district and Bunche's enrollment numbers dwindled.

== Athletics ==
Glasgow High sports teams compete under the nickname "Scotties," in honor of the city's Scottish heritage and name. Their colors are blue and white. The Scotties compete in football, soccer, basketball, baseball, softball, volleyball, golf, swimming, track and field, and cross country on the varsity levels, and lacrosse as a club sport.

The Scotties' most notable achievement was their 1967–68 state basketball championship in Kentucky's single-class tournament. The team was coached by Jim Richards, who went on to become head coach at nearby Western Kentucky University. In 2000–01, the team also won the "All A" Championship Tournament, a separate tournament for Kentucky's small schools; then-coach Bart Flener is now an assistant coach at Asbury University. In 2002, Brandon Stockton was named Kentucky Mr. Basketball.

The Scotties also won the 2002 "All A" State Championship in boys' soccer.

The Lady Scotties golf team won four consecutive state titles from 1997 to 2000, then again in 2008. The five titles tied Glasgow with Sacred Heart Academy of Louisville for the most state team titles.

The Scottie football team has reached the 2A State Championship four times, 1982–1983, 1999–2000, 2000–2001, as well as 2011–2012. The 2011–2012 team holds the school record for most wins in a season with 14, just falling short to Covington Holy Cross, 33–14, in the 2012 State Championship, ending the Scotties season 14–1.

== Band ==
The Glasgow Scottie Band traditionally wears full Scottish regalia as its uniform, and often includes bagpipe players. The band was directed by Charles B. Honeycutt for more than two decades; he later became the school's principal, then mayor of Glasgow. The band is now directed by Anthony Thompson, a graduate of Eastern Kentucky University.

The band participates in marching band contests sponsored by the Kentucky Music Educators Association, Bands of America, and the MidStates Band Association throughout the marching season. The Scottie band won the class 3A state championship in 1986 and 2A state championship in 2010, 2012, 2013, and 2022.

== Academic team ==
In 2015, Glasgow High School won the Quick Recall State Championship, known among Kentucky academic competitions as the Governor's Cup. The team consisted of Hunter Lindsey, Olivia Kiser, Jacob Cooper, Caleb Barfield, James Dyer, Garrison Page, Anish Patel and Rajeev Nair. The team was coached by Todd Garrison. In 2017 the GHS Academic Team won the National Academic Quiz Tournaments Traditional Public Small School National Championship, a feat which they repeated in 2018, 2019 and 2022.

== Notable alumni ==
- Rod Henderson (born 1971) – former Major League Baseball pitcher
- Kelly Craft (née Guilfoil) (born 1962) – U.S. ambassador to the United Nations and U.S. ambassador to Canada
- Billy Vaughn (1919–1991) – jazz musician, singer, multi-instrumentalist, orchestra leader, and record executive.

== Notable staff ==
- Jim Richards – former basketball coach
