= Kentucky's 67th House of Representatives district =

American legislative district

Kentucky's 67th State House of Representatives district
Representative
Matthew Lehman; D–Newport
since January 1, 2025
- Registration: 43.1% Democratic; 39.1% Republican; 16.8% No party preference
- Demographics: 87.3% White; 4.6% Black; 3.6% Hispanic; 1.0% Asian; 0.3% Other; 3.2% Multiracial
- Population (2023): 42,639
- Registered voters (2025): 36,641

Kentucky's 67th House of Representatives district is one of 100 districts in the Kentucky House of Representatives. Located in the northern part of the state, it comprises part of Campbell County. It has been represented by Matthew Lehman (D–Newport) since 2025. As of 2023, the district had a population of 42,639.

== Voter registration ==
On January 1, 2025, the district had 36,641 registered voters, who were registered with the following parties.

Party	Registration	
Party	Voters	%
Democratic	15,790	43.09
Republican	14,311	39.06
Independent	2,786	7.60
Libertarian	297	0.81
Green	49	0.13
Socialist Workers	16	0.04
Constitution	13	0.04
Reform	4	0.01
"Other"	3,375	9.21
Total	36,641	100.00
Source: Kentucky State Board of Elections

== List of members representing the district ==
Member	Party	Years	Electoral history	District location
Charles M. Ciarlo (Newport)	Republican	January 1, 1920 – January 1, 1922	Elected in 1919. Retired to run for County Attorney of Campbell County.	1920–1944; City of Newport.
Herman Q. Thompson (Newport)	Republican	January 1, 1922 – June 23, 1924	Elected in 1921. Reelected in 1923. Died.	1920–1944; City of Newport.
Phillip J. Ryan (Newport)	Democratic	January 1, 1926 – January 1, 1928	Elected in 1925. Lost reelection.	1920–1944; City of Newport.
Phillip Helf (Newport)	Republican	January 1, 1928 – January 1, 1930	Elected in 1927. Lost reelection.	1920–1944; City of Newport.
William A. Eimer (Newport)	Democratic	January 1, 1930 – June 1933	Elected in 1929. Reelected in 1931. Resigned to become postmaster of Newport.	1920–1944; City of Newport.
Elmer T. Gray (Newport)	Democratic	August 15, 1933 – January 1, 1934	Elected to finish Eimer's term. Retired.	1920–1944; City of Newport.
James B. Milliken (Newport)	Democratic	January 1, 1934 – January 1, 1936	Elected in 1933. [data missing]	1920–1944; City of Newport.
Carl Scheben (Newport)	Democratic	January 1, 1936 – January 1, 1944	Elected in 1935. Reelected in 1937. Reelected in 1939. Reelected in 1941. Redistricted to the 63rd district.	1920–1944; City of Newport.
Edward F. Prichard (Paris)	Democratic	January 1, 1944 – January 1, 1950	Elected in 1943. Reelected in 1945. Reelected in 1947. Lost renomination.	1944–1964; Bourbon and Nicholas Counties.
Joseph T. Snapp (Paris)	Democratic	January 1, 1950 – January 1, 1952	Elected in 1949. Lost renomination.	1944–1964; Bourbon and Nicholas Counties.
William W. Blanton (Paris)	Democratic	January 1, 1952 – January 1, 1954	Elected in 1951. Lost renomination.	1944–1964; Bourbon and Nicholas Counties.
Cassius M. Clay (Paris)	Democratic	January 1, 1954 – January 1, 1956	Elected in 1953. Retired to run for Attorney; General of Kentucky.	1944–1964; Bourbon and Nicholas Counties.
Brooks Hinkle (Paris)	Democratic	January 1, 1956 – January 1, 1964	Elected in 1955. Reelected in 1957. Reelected in 1959. Reelected in 1961. Redistricted to the 72nd district.	1944–1964; Bourbon and Nicholas Counties.
James E. Murphy (Newport)	Democratic	January 1, 1964 – April 28, 1972	Redistricted from the 63rd district and reelected in 1963. Reelected in 1965. Reelected in 1967. Reelected in 1969. Reelected in 1971. Resigned to become Newport police judge.	1964–1972; City of Newport.
James E. Murphy (Newport)	Democratic	January 1, 1964 – April 28, 1972	Redistricted from the 63rd district and reelected in 1963. Reelected in 1965. Reelected in 1967. Reelected in 1969. Reelected in 1971. Resigned to become Newport police judge.	1972–1974; Cities of Newport, Southgate, and Wilder.
Terry L. Mann (Newport)	Democratic	May 1972 – January 1, 1987	Elected to finish Murphy's term. Reelected in 1973. Reelected in 1975. Reelected in 1977. Reelected in 1979. Reelected in 1981. Reelected in 1984. Retired to run for Kentucky's; 4th congressional district.	1972–1974; Cities of Newport, Southgate, and Wilder.
Terry L. Mann (Newport)	Democratic	May 1972 – January 1, 1987	Elected to finish Murphy's term. Reelected in 1973. Reelected in 1975. Reelected in 1977. Reelected in 1979. Reelected in 1981. Reelected in 1984. Retired to run for Kentucky's; 4th congressional district.	1974–1985; Campbell (part) and Kenton (part) Counties.
Terry L. Mann (Newport)	Democratic	May 1972 – January 1, 1987	Elected to finish Murphy's term. Reelected in 1973. Reelected in 1975. Reelected in 1977. Reelected in 1979. Reelected in 1981. Reelected in 1984. Retired to run for Kentucky's; 4th congressional district.	1985–1993; Campbell (part) and Kenton (part) Counties.
Jim Callahan (Wilder)	Democratic	January 1, 1987 – January 1, 2005	Elected in 1986. Reelected in 1988. Reelected in 1990. Reelected in 1992. Reelected in 1994. Reelected in 1996. Reelected in 1998. Reelected in 2000. Reelected in 2002. Retired.	1985–1993; Campbell (part) and Kenton (part) Counties.
Jim Callahan (Wilder)	Democratic	January 1, 1987 – January 1, 2005	Elected in 1986. Reelected in 1988. Reelected in 1990. Reelected in 1992. Reelected in 1994. Reelected in 1996. Reelected in 1998. Reelected in 2000. Reelected in 2002. Retired.	1993–1997; Campbell (part) and Kenton (part) Counties.
Jim Callahan (Wilder)	Democratic	January 1, 1987 – January 1, 2005	Elected in 1986. Reelected in 1988. Reelected in 1990. Reelected in 1992. Reelected in 1994. Reelected in 1996. Reelected in 1998. Reelected in 2000. Reelected in 2002. Retired.	1997–2003
Jim Callahan (Wilder)	Democratic	January 1, 1987 – January 1, 2005	Elected in 1986. Reelected in 1988. Reelected in 1990. Reelected in 1992. Reelected in 1994. Reelected in 1996. Reelected in 1998. Reelected in 2000. Reelected in 2002. Retired.	2003–2015
Dennis Keene (Wilder)	Democratic	January 1, 2005 – December 2019	Elected in 2004. Reelected in 2006. Reelected in 2008. Reelected in 2010. Reelected in 2012. Reelected in 2014. Reelected in 2016. Reelected in 2018. Resigned to become Kentucky; Commissioner of Local Government.	2003–2015
Dennis Keene (Wilder)	Democratic	January 1, 2005 – December 2019	Elected in 2004. Reelected in 2006. Reelected in 2008. Reelected in 2010. Reelected in 2012. Reelected in 2014. Reelected in 2016. Reelected in 2018. Resigned to become Kentucky; Commissioner of Local Government.	2015–2023
Rachel Roberts (Newport)	Democratic	March 3, 2020 – January 1, 2025	Elected to finish Keene's term. Reelected in 2020. Reelected in 2022. Retired.	2015–2023
Rachel Roberts (Newport)	Democratic	March 3, 2020 – January 1, 2025	Elected to finish Keene's term. Reelected in 2020. Reelected in 2022. Retired.	2023–present
Matthew Lehman (Newport)	Democratic	January 1, 2025 – present	Elected in 2024. Reelected in 2026.	2023–present
