= Steve Riley (politician) =

American politician

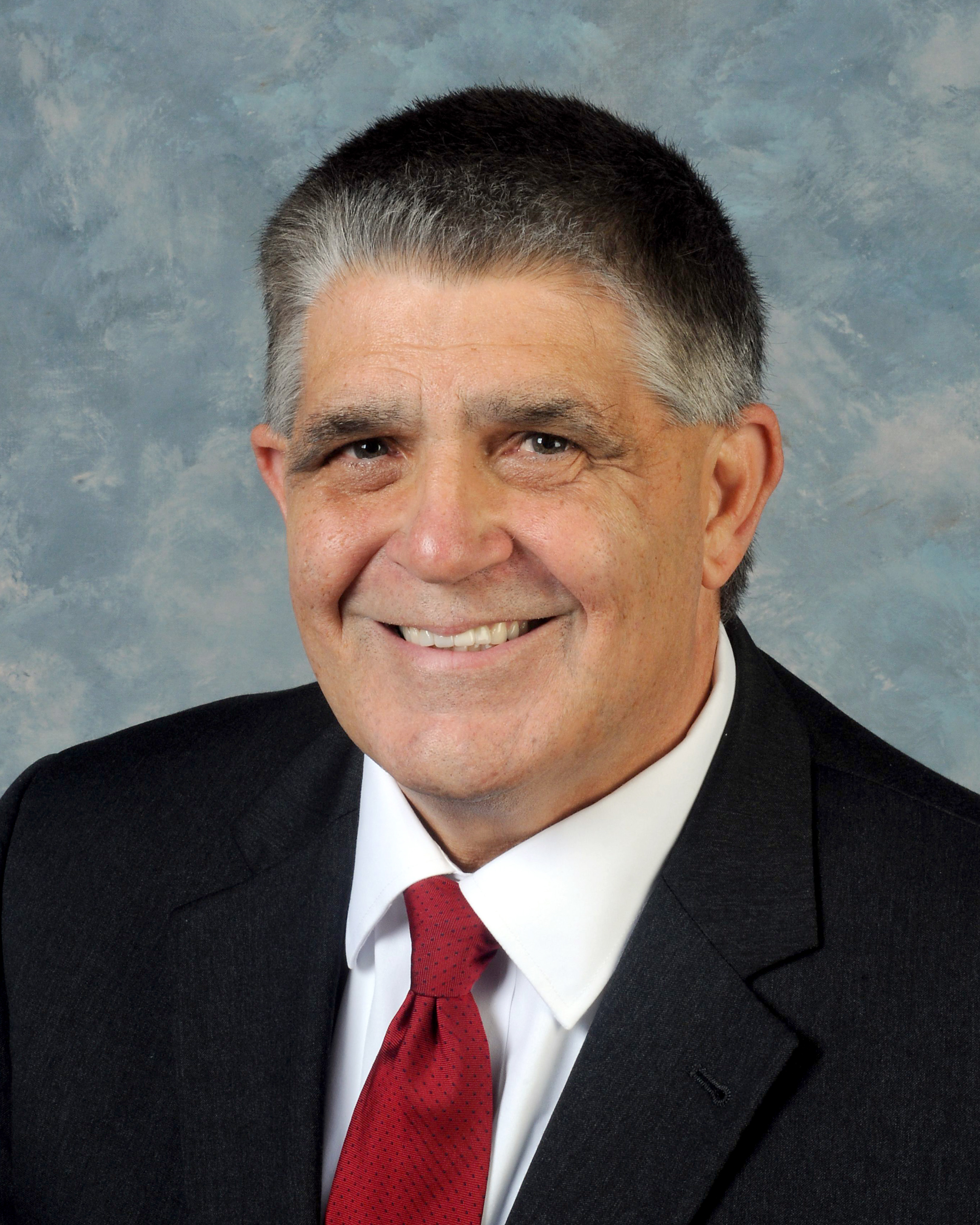

Member of the Kentucky House of Representatives from the 23rd district
- Incumbent
- Assumed office January 1, 2017
- Preceded by: Johnny Bell

Personal details
- Born: June 23, 1958 (age 68)
- Party: Republican
- Education: Western Kentucky University (BA) (MA)
- Committees: BR Sub. on Postsecondary Education (chair); Appropriations & Revenue; Families and Children; Health Services

Stephen Douglas Riley (born June 23, 1958) is an American politician and Republican member of the Kentucky House of Representatives from Kentucky's 23rd House district. His district consists of Barren County. He assumed office on January 1, 2017.

== Background ==
Riley earned a Bachelor of Arts in history and government as well as a Master of Arts in history and education from Western Kentucky University. Before retirement, he worked for 31 years at Barren County High School as a teacher, assistant principal, principal, and basketball coach.

He is a member of the Glasgow-Barren County Chamber of Commerce and the Glasgow Rotary Club. Riley is also a former board member of the Kentucky High School Athletic Association.

== Political career ==
=== Elections ===
- 2016 Democratic incumbent and House Majority Whip Johnny Bell chose not to seek reelection. Riley won the 2016 Republican primary with 2,572 votes (71.8%) against opponent Freddie Joe Wilkerson. Riley won the 2016 Kentucky House of Representatives election with 11,445 votes (61.5%) against Democratic candidate Danny J. Basil.
- 2018 Riley was unopposed in the 2018 Republican primary, and won the 2018 Kentucky House of Representatives election with 11,019 votes (72%) against Democratic candidate LaToya Drake.
- 2020 Riley was unopposed in the 2020 Republican primary, and won the 2020 Kentucky House of Representatives election with 15,398 votes (77.1%) against Democratic candidate Steve Jones and Libertarian candidate Timothy Filback Sr.
- 2022 Riley was unopposed in both the 2022 Republican primary and the 2022 Kentucky House of Representatives election, winning the latter with 11,747 votes.
- 2024 Riley was unopposed in both the 2024 Republican primary and the 2024 Kentucky House of Representatives election, winning the latter with 16,517 votes.
