= Kentucky's 11th House of Representatives district =

American legislative district

Kentucky's 11th State House of Representatives district
Representative
J. T. Payne; R–Henderson
since January 1, 2025
- Registration: 53.4% Democratic; 37.0% Republican; 9.1% No party preference
- Demographics: 84.4% White; 6.8% Black; 3.2% Hispanic; 0.2% Asian; 0.3% Native American; 0.2% Hawaiian/Pacific Islander; 4.8% Multiracial
- Population (2023): 44,493
- Registered voters (2025): 34,952

Kentucky's 11th House of Representatives district is one of 100 districts in the Kentucky House of Representatives. Located in the western part of the state, it comprises Henderson County. It has been represented by J. T. Payne (R–Henderson) since 2025. As of 2023, the district had a population of 44,493.

== Voter registration ==
On January 1, 2025, the district had 34,952 registered voters, who were registered with the following parties.

Party	Registration	
Party	Voters	%
Democratic	18,666	53.40
Republican	12,920	36.96
Independent	1,201	3.44
Libertarian	140	0.40
Constitution	24	0.07
Green	23	0.07
Socialist Workers	4	0.01
Reform	1	0.00
"Other"	1,973	5.64
Total	34,952	100.00
Source: Kentucky State Board of Elections

== List of members representing the district ==
Member	Party	Years	Electoral history	District location
A. G. Pritchett (Henderson)	Democratic	January 1, 1985 – January 1, 1993	Elected in 1984. Reelected in 1986. Reelected in 1988. Reelected in 1990. Retired.	1985–1993; Henderson County (part).
Gross Lindsay (Henderson)	Democratic	January 1, 1993 – January 1, 2007	Elected in 1992. Reelected in 1994. Reelected in 1996. Reelected in 1998. Reelected in 2000. Reelected in 2002. Reelected in 2004. Lost renomination.	1993–1997; Henderson County (part).
Gross Lindsay (Henderson)	Democratic	January 1, 1993 – January 1, 2007	Elected in 1992. Reelected in 1994. Reelected in 1996. Reelected in 1998. Reelected in 2000. Reelected in 2002. Reelected in 2004. Lost renomination.	1997–2003
Gross Lindsay (Henderson)	Democratic	January 1, 1993 – January 1, 2007	Elected in 1992. Reelected in 1994. Reelected in 1996. Reelected in 1998. Reelected in 2000. Reelected in 2002. Reelected in 2004. Lost renomination.	2003–2015
David Watkins (Henderson)	Democratic	January 1, 2007 – January 1, 2017	Elected in 2006. Reelected in 2008. Reelected in 2010. Reelected in 2012. Reelected in 2014. Lost reelection.	2003–2015
David Watkins (Henderson)	Democratic	January 1, 2007 – January 1, 2017	Elected in 2006. Reelected in 2008. Reelected in 2010. Reelected in 2012. Reelected in 2014. Lost reelection.	2015–2023
Robby Mills (Henderson)	Republican	January 1, 2017 – January 1, 2019	Elected in 2016. Retired to run for the Kentucky Senate.	2015–2023
Rob Wiederstein (Henderson)	Democratic	January 1, 2019 – January 1, 2021	Elected in 2018. Lost reelection.	2015–2023
Jonathan Dixon (Corydon)	Republican	January 1, 2021 – January 1, 2025	Elected in 2020. Reelected in 2022. Retired.	2015–2023
Jonathan Dixon (Corydon)	Republican	January 1, 2021 – January 1, 2025	Elected in 2020. Reelected in 2022. Retired.	2023–present
J. T. Payne (Henderson)	Republican	January 1, 2025 – present	Elected in 2024. Reelected in 2026.	2023–present
