= Bobby H. Richardson =

American politician (born 1944)

88th Speaker of the Kentucky House of Representatives
- In office January 5, 1982 – January 8, 1985
- Preceded by: William G. Kenton
- Succeeded by: Donald Blandford

Majority Leader of the Kentucky House of Representatives
- In office January 6, 1976 – January 5, 1982
- Preceded by: John Swinford
- Succeeded by: Jim LeMaster

Member of the Kentucky House of Representatives from the 23rd district
- In office January 1, 1972 – January 1, 1991
- Preceded by: Walter Arnold Baker
- Succeeded by: Steve Nunn

Personal details
- Born: November 25, 1944 (age 81) Glasgow, Kentucky, U.S.
- Party: Democratic
- Spouse: Elaine Alexander (m. 1970)
- Education: Western Kentucky University; University of Kentucky

Bobby Harold Richardson (born November 25, 1944) is an American politician and educator in the state of Kentucky.

Richardson was born in Glasgow, Kentucky in 1944. He attended Western Kentucky University and the University of Kentucky, earning his J.D. from the latter, then established a law practice in his hometown.

In 1971, Richardson was elected to the Kentucky House of Representatives for the 23rd district representing Barren County, and served from 1972 until his retirement in 1990. He was also a delegate to the Democratic National Convention in 1976. He also served as Speaker of the House from 1982 to 1985.

Richardson's time in the Kentucky House of Representatives is notable for his collaboration with fellow representatives, such as George Street Boone, Nick Kafoglis, and Bill Kenton, among others, on improving the Kentucky General Assembly's legislative independence from the Governor of Kentucky. Allies in the Kentucky State Senate included Joe Wright, John M. Berry Jr., Mike Moloney, David Karem, Lowell Hughes, Danny Meyer, Ed O'Daniel, and John A. Rose, known collectively as the "Black Sheep Squadron," a reference to the television show Black Sheep Squadron. Prior to the election of John Y. Brown Jr. in 1979, along with Kenton's ascension to Speaker of the House of Representatives and Richardson's ascension to Majority Leader of the House of Representatives, the governor played a large role in the election of leadership and the prioritization of bills in both chambers of the General Assembly. Often, the governor used a series of quid pro quo agreements to guarantee leadership positions and opportunities for bills written by legislators to be heard, receiving votes on their own agenda in the process. Richardson and allies began their movement under the tenure of Governor Julian Carroll, but were unsuccessful. They used newly elected Governor Brown's "outsider" status and shallow involvement in Kentucky's political machine, relative to his predecessors, to launch a successful offensive to increase the legislative autonomy afforded to them by the sitting Governor.

Among these reforms was the "Kenton Amendment," named after Representative Bill Kenton, which was a proposed constitutional amendment via legislative referral that Kentucky voters approved by voting through a referendum on Kentucky's 1979 Election Day ballot as "Amendment 2," alongside Brown's gubernatorial victory. The amendment scheduled elections for members of both chambers of the General Assembly on even-numbered years, moving the elections of the legislators from the same ballot as the Kentucky gubernatorial election, which occurs on odd-numbered years. It also established 10-day sessions to occur in odd-numbered years during which the General Assembly would convene only to elect Assembly leadership, adopt rules of procedure, and organize committee rosters. This provision was later rendered moot when Kentucky approved a constitutional amendment in 2000 establishing 30-day regular sessions in which the legislature is able to perform legislative duties, meaning the General Assembly then began holding regular legislative sessions annually. The only difference between odd- and even-numbered year regular sessions, other than the length, is that any bills raising revenue or appropriating funds during the odd-numbered sessions must be passed with a three-fifths supermajority. Kentucky operates under a biennial budget, which is passed by the legislature on even-numbered years. Furthermore, the Kenton Amendment prohibited regular even-numbered year sessions of the General Assembly from proceeding longer than April 15.
