= Frankfort High School =

Frankfort High School is the name of several high schools in the United States:

- Frankfort High School (Michigan) – Frankfort, Michigan
- Frankfort High School (Indiana) – Frankfort, Indiana
- Frankfort High School (Kansas) – Frankfort, Kansas
- Frankfort High School (Kentucky) – Frankfort, Kentucky
- Frankfort High School (West Virginia) – Short Gap, West Virginia

See also:

- Frankford High School
