= A. G. Pritchett =

American politician (1928–2003)

Member of the Kentucky House of Representatives from the 11th district
- In office January 1, 1985 – January 1, 1993
- Preceded by: David Thomason
- Succeeded by: Gross Lindsay

Judge/Executive of Henderson County (Note: The former position of County Judge was renamed to Judge/Executive effective with the 1977 elections.)
- In office January 7, 1974 – December 1984
- Preceded by: John Stanley Hoffman
- Succeeded by: James Buley

Personal details
- Born: February 18, 1928
- Died: July 24, 2003 (aged 75)
- Party: Democratic

Aaron G. Pritchett (February 18, 1928 – July 24, 2003) was an American politician from Kentucky who was a member of the Kentucky House of Representatives from 1985 to 1993. Pritchett was first elected to the house in 1984 when incumbent representative David Thomason retired. He did not seek reelection in 1992.

Pritchett died in July 2003 at age 75.
