= Jonathan Dixon (politician) =

American politician

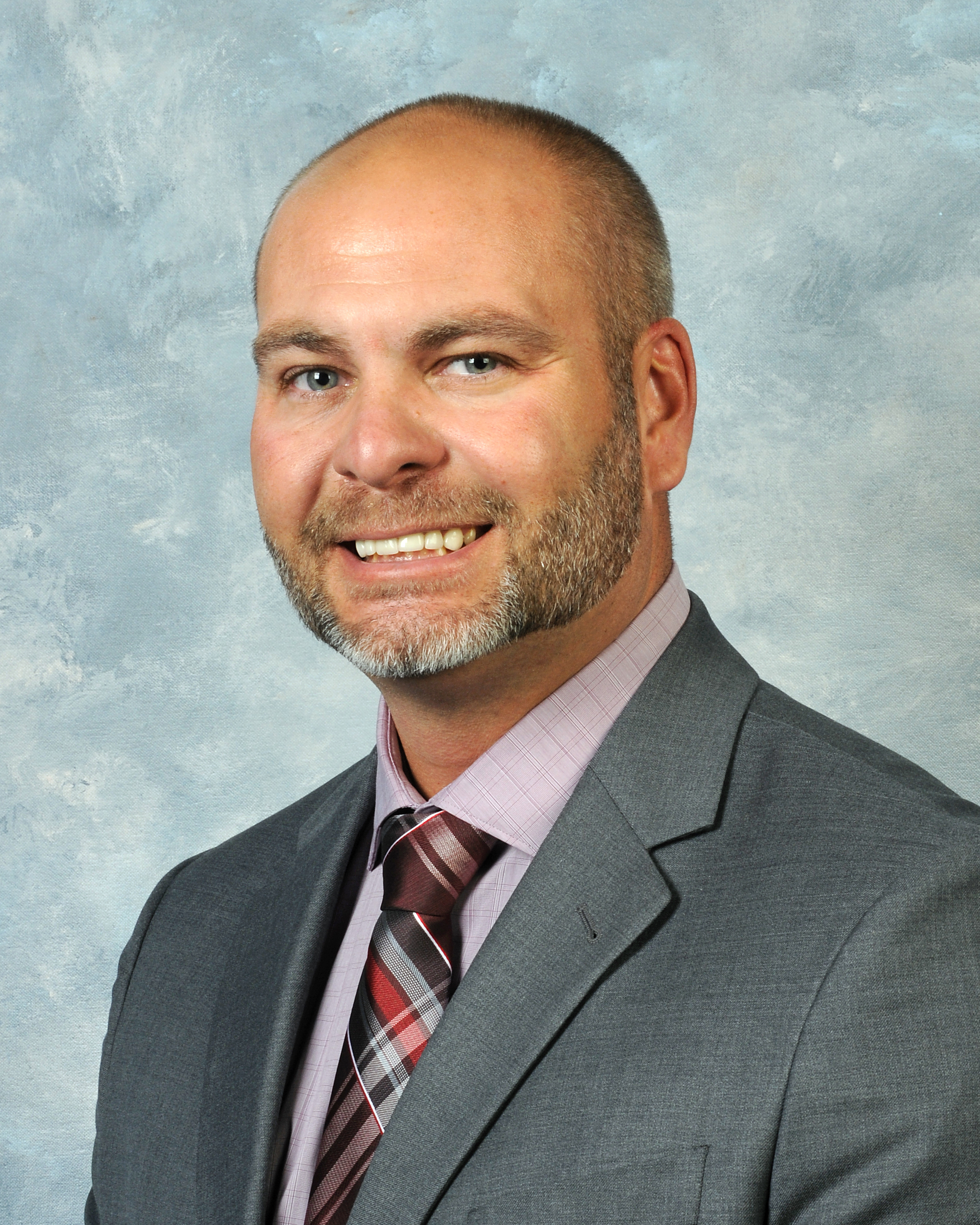

Member of the Kentucky House of Representatives from the 11th district
- In office January 1, 2021 – January 1, 2025
- Preceded by: Rob Wiederstein
- Succeeded by: J. T. Payne

Personal details
- Born: August 14, 1981 (age 44)
- Party: Republican
- Occupation: Business owner
- Committees: Transportation (vice-chair); Agriculture; Licensing, Occupations, and Administrative Regulations; Local Government

Jonathan Dale Dixon (born August 14, 1981) is an American politician who served as a Republican member of the Kentucky House of Representatives from 2021 to 2025. He represented Kentucky's 11th house district, which includes only Henderson County. He did not seek reelection in 2024.

== Background ==
Dixon graduated from Henderson County High School in 1999. Dixon owns Fence Pros. LLC, and served as President of the Indiana and Kentucky Chapter of the American Fence Association (AFA) for four consecutive years.

He currently resides in Corydon.

== Political career ==
=== Elections ===
- 2020 Dixon was unopposed in the 2020 Republican primary for Kentucky's 11th House district and won the 2020 Kentucky House of Representatives election against Democratic incumbent Rob Wiederstein, winning with 10,825 votes.
- 2022 Dixon was unopposed in the 2022 republican primary and won the 2022 Kentucky House of Representatives election against Democratic candidate Velvet Dowdy, winning with 8,850 votes.
- 2024 Dixon chose not to seek reelection to Kentucky's 11th House district. Henderson County High School teacher and administrator, JT Payne, is unopposed to fill Dixon's seat in the 2024 Kentucky House of Representatives election on November 5.
