= David Watkins (Kentucky politician) =

American politician

Member of the Kentucky House of Representatives from the 11th district
- In office January 1, 2007 – January 1, 2017
- Preceded by: Gross Lindsay
- Succeeded by: Robby Mills

Personal details
- Born: March 10, 1943 (age 83)
- Party: Democratic
- Education: Western Kentucky University; University of Louisville School of Medicine
- Profession: Physician

David Allen Watkins (born March 10, 1943) is an American politician who was a Democratic member of the Kentucky House of Representatives from 2007 to 2017, representing District 11. He was defeated for reelection in 2016 by Republican Robby Mills.

== Education ==
Watkins earned his BS and MA from Western Kentucky University and his MD from the University of Louisville School of Medicine.

== Elections ==
- 2012 Watkins and returning 2010 Republican challenger Paul DeSpain were both unopposed for their May 22, 2012 primaries, setting up a rematch; Watkins won the November 6, 2012 General election with 9,714 votes (62.0%) against DeSpain.
- 2006 Watkins challenged District 11 incumbent Representative Gross Lindsay in the 2006 Democratic Primary, winning with 4,765 votes (53.2%) against Representative Lindsay, and was unopposed for the November 7, 2006 General election, winning with 9,264 votes.
- 2008 Watkins was challenged in the 2008 Democratic Primary, winning with 5,302 votes (60.4%) and was unopposed for the November 4, 2008 General election, winning with 13,935 votes.
- 2010 Watkins was unopposed for the May 18, 2010 Democratic Primary and won the November 2, 2010 General election with 7,078 votes (60.6%) against Republican nominee Paul DeSpain.

== Committee leadership positions ==
David Watkins has served in the following committee leadership roles in the Kentucky House of Representatives: Medicaid Oversight and Advisory Committee (co-chair); Tourism Development and Energy (vice-chair), Appropriations and Revenue - Human Resources (vice chair), and Health and Welfare (vice chair). He has been a member of the committees on Economic Development and Tourism, Appropriations and Revenue, Education, Education - Postsecondary Education, and Transportation.
