= Rob Wiederstein =

American politician (born 1968)

Member of the Kentucky House of Representatives from the 11th district
- In office January 1, 2019 – January 1, 2021
- Preceded by: Robby Mills
- Succeeded by: Jonathan Dixon

Judge of the 51st Kentucky District Court
- In office January 4, 1999 – June 1, 2016
- Preceded by: Anita Mindrup-Ivie
- Succeeded by: Jill Brady

Personal details
- Born: April 3, 1968 (age 58) Louisville, Kentucky
- Party: Democratic
- Spouse: Cathy
- Education: Hanover College (BA); Indiana University Robert H. McKinney School of Law (JD)

Robert Khuon Wiederstein (born April 3, 1968) is an American politician. He represented District 11 as a Democrat in the Kentucky House of Representatives from 2019 to 2021.

== Early life ==
Wiederstein was born in Louisville, Kentucky. He earned a BA in economics from Hanover College in 1990 and a JD from Indiana University in 1993.

== Political career ==
Wiederstein was a judge for the 51st District Court in Kentucky from 1999 to 2016.

Wiederstein was elected to represent District 11 in the Kentucky House of Representatives in 2018 following the retirement of Robby Mills to run for the Kentucky Senate. He lost reelection in 2020 to Republican Jonathan Dixon.

== Electoral history ==
=== 1998 ===
1998 51st Kentucky District Court, 1st division election
| Party | Candidate | Votes | % |
|---|---|---|---|
| Nonpartisan | Rob Wiederstein | 6,939 | 61.8 |
| Nonpartisan | Anita Mindrup-Ivie (incumbent) | 4,296 | 38.2 |
| Total votes | | 11,235 | 100.0 |

=== 2002 ===
Primary election results
| Party | Candidate | Votes | % |
|---|---|---|---|
| Nonpartisan | Rob Wiederstein (incumbent) | 5,709 | 57.0 |
| Nonpartisan | James G. Womack | 2,378 | 23.8 |
| Nonpartisan | Anita Mindrup-Ivie | 1,921 | 19.2 |
| Total votes | | 10,008 | 100.0 |

2002 51st Kentucky District Court, 1st division election
| Party | Candidate | Votes | % |
|---|---|---|---|
| Nonpartisan | Rob Wiederstein (incumbent) | 7,812 | 65.6 |
| Nonpartisan | James G. Womack | 4,105 | 34.4 |
| Total votes | | 11,917 | 100.0 |

=== 2006 ===
2006 51st Kentucky District Court, 1st division election
| Party | Candidate | Votes | % |
|---|---|---|---|
| Nonpartisan | Rob Wiederstein (incumbent) | Unopposed | |
| Total votes | | 9,673 | 100.0 |

=== 2010 ===
2010 51st Kentucky District Court, 1st division election
| Party | Candidate | Votes | % |
|---|---|---|---|
| Nonpartisan | Rob Wiederstein (incumbent) | Unopposed | |
| Total votes | | 9,685 | 100.0 |

=== 2014 ===
2014 51st Kentucky District Court, 1st division election
| Party | Candidate | Votes | % |
|---|---|---|---|
| Nonpartisan | Rob Wiederstein (incumbent) | Unopposed | |
| Total votes | | 9,588 | 100.0 |

=== 2018 ===
2018 Kentucky House of Representatives 11th district election
| Party | Candidate | Votes | % |
|---|---|---|---|
| Democratic | Rob Wiederstein | 7,994 | 53.8 |
| Republican | James Buckmaster | 6,870 | 46.2 |
| Total votes | | 14,864 | 100.0 |
| Democratic gain from Republican | | | |

=== 2020 ===
2020 Kentucky House of Representatives 11th district election
| Party | Candidate | Votes | % |
|---|---|---|---|
| Republican | Jonathan Dixon | 10,825 | 54.0 |
| Democratic | Robert "Rob" Wiederstein (incumbent) | 9,223 | 46.0 |
| Total votes | | 20,048 | 100.0 |
| Republican gain from Democratic | | | |
