= Carolyn Belcher =

American politician

Judge/Executive of Bath County
- In office November 2007 – January 3, 2011
- Preceded by: Lowell Jamison
- Succeeded by: Lowell Jamison

Member of the Kentucky House of Representatives from the 72nd district
- In office January 1, 1999 – November 2007
- Preceded by: Jim Lovell
- Succeeded by: Sannie Overly

Personal details
- Party: Democratic

Carolyn Belcher (born 1953) is an American politician from Kentucky who was a member of the Kentucky House of Representatives from 1999 to 2007. Belcher was first elected to the house in 1998 after defeating incumbent representative Jim Lovell in the May primary election. She was previously the treasurer of Bath County from 1994 to 1999. She resigned from the house in 2007 after winning a special election to be Judge/Executive of Bath County. She did not seek reelection in 2010.
