= Fort Williams (Kentucky) =

American Civil War fort in Kentucky

- Near Glasgow, Kentucky

Site information
- Type: Fortification

Site history
- Built: 1863
- Built by: Union Army
- Battles/wars: American Civil War

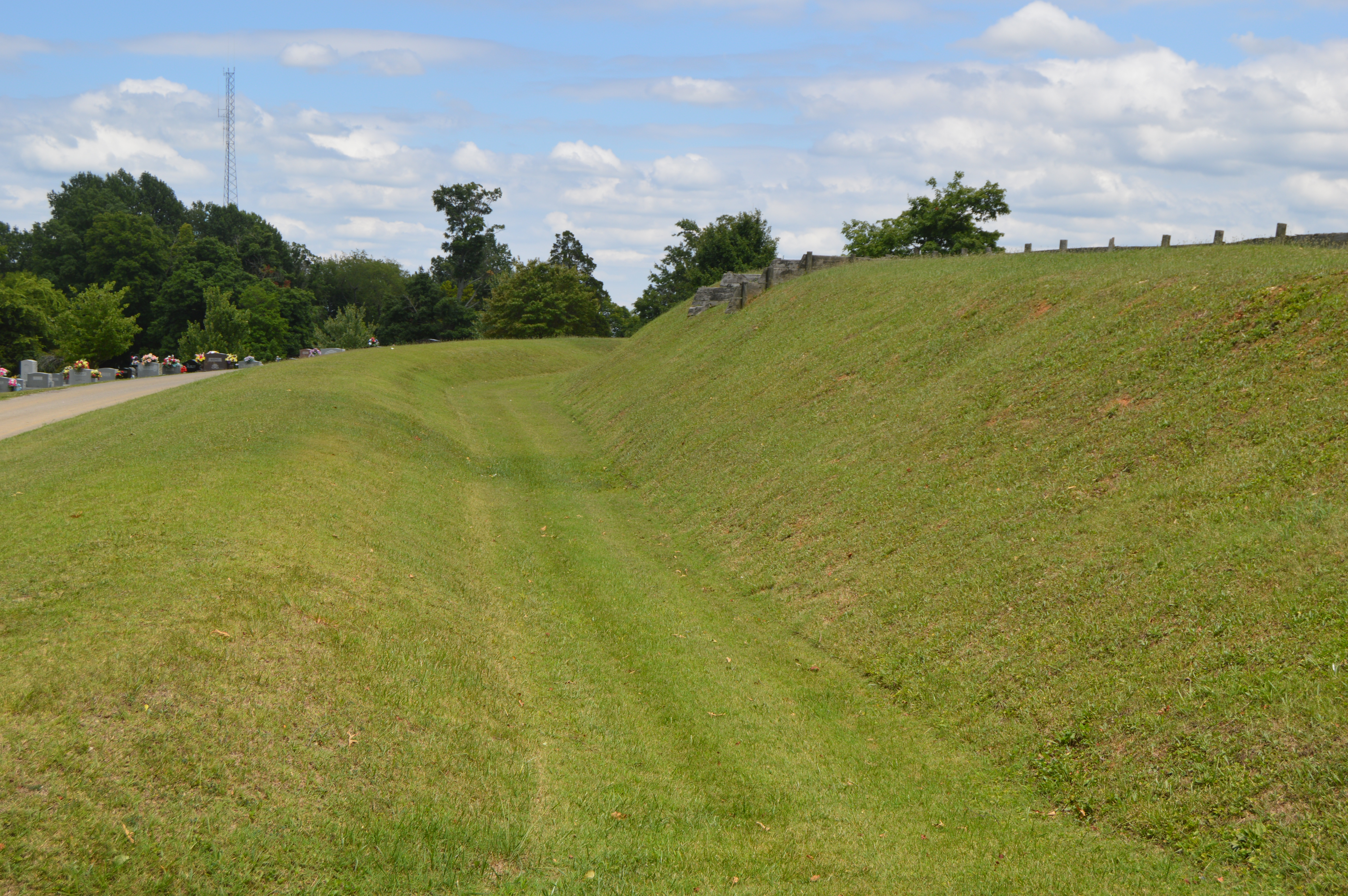
The restored ditch of the fort. On the right is where Confederate General Joseph H. Lewis is buried.

Fort Williams, also known as Forts Hobson or Boyle, is an American fortification constructed near the city of Glasgow, Kentucky. The fort was constructed by Union forces during the American Civil War to stop raids by the Confederate general John Hunt Morgan, and to protect the vital rail lines at Cave City. The fort was abandoned after the end of the American Civil War. In the 1980s, the site of the fort was renovated, and has now become a park.

== American Civil War ==
In early 1863, the Southern Kentucky cities of Glasgow and Tompkinsville were the biggest cities captured from Confederate forces in Kentucky during the American Civil War. Union troops began arriving in Cave City 11 miles away via train, and marching to Glasgow to join the 23rd Army Corps under General Henry M. Judah. From Glasgow, scouting parties fanned out to find Confederate raiders, such as the ones under John Hunt Morgan. Major General Horatio Wright, the commander of the Department of the Ohio, ordered that a fort be built to protect the rail lines near Glasgow. Work building the fort started in mid 1863 and was completed in late summer of that year. The fort was originally named Fort Hobson, but was changed to Fort Williams in May 1864 to honor Brigadier General Thomas Williams, who was killed at the Battle of Baton Rouge in 1862. The soldiers who garrisoned the fort didn’t live inside of it, but camped right outside of it. A supply warehouse, a few small wooden buildings, and several cannon positions were constructed inside the fort.

The only notable engagement with the fort was Oct. 6, 1863. That morning at dawn, Fort Williams came under fire from 129 men from the 25th Tennessee under the command of Confederate Col. John M. Hughes. According to Hughes’ report, he was attacking 420 men of the 27th Kentucky Mounted Infantry under command of Maj. Samuel Martin. 50 men were camped around the town hall, and 30 men were out on patrol. Also according to Hughes’ report, he killed 9 men, wounded 26 and captured 226. He also captured 200 horses and $250,000 from the Union quartermaster. Hughes also said he had 1 killed and 4 wounded. Major Martin’s report contradicts Hughes’ report. In Martin’s report, he said the Confederates captured 142 men, 200 horses, 100 carbine rifles, and stole $9,000 from the local bank. Also in Martin’s report was 13 Confederates wounded, 4 of whom later died. Before leaving, Col. Hughes burned down part of the fort. The Union prisoners were marched to the Tennessee state line and paroled, which meant they were allowed to go home. Union troops recaptured Fort Williams the next day, and held it for the rest of the war without incident.

The most probable cause for the rout of the much larger Union force was most likely due to Maj. Martin’s overconfidence in his position and numerical advantage. On Oct. 4, he wrote to his superior Gen. Jeremiah T. Boyle "I can keep all of the Rebels now at the Cumberland River out of this place and can whip them anywhere I find them." Maj. Martin’ had just been resupplied by new recruits and was notorious for not enforcing discipline. All of these factors most likely led to the Union rout.

== Restoration ==
After the American Civil War ended, the fort was abandoned since it wasn’t needed any more. As time went on, the ramparts collapsed and silt filled the trenches. In the 1950s and ‘60s, interest grew in restoring the fort. In 1969, a historic marker was placed at the site of the fort. In 1976, the Fort Williams Restoration Commission secured funding from the National Park Service, the Kentucky Heritage Council, and the City of Glasgow to rebuild the fort to what it was before Col. Hughes’ attack. They called in a restoration architect to rebuild the fort the way it was from historical documents Between 1977 and 1978, Dr. Jack M. Schock from Western Kentucky University's Department of Archeology conducted surveys of the original fort’s site to understand its size and height. Funding limitations forced the Fort Williams Restoration Commission to downsize their planned rebuild of the fort. The rebuild of the fort was completed in 1980. In a nearby cemetery is Gen. Joseph H. Lewis, the commander of the Confederate unit the 1st Kentucky (Orphan) Infantry Regiment. In 2026, reenactors belonging to the 9th Kentucky Volunteer Infantry set up camp on the site of Fort Williams a part of a historical reenactment.
