= Glasgow Independent Schools =

Barren County public school district

Address
- 711 South L. Rogers Wells Blvd. Glasgow, Kentucky, 42141; United States

District information
- Grades: K – 12
- Superintendent: Dr. Chad Muhlenkamp

Students and staff
- Enrollment: 1,980
- District mascot: Scotties

Other information
- Website: glasgow.kyschools.us

Glasgow Independent Schools is a public school district in Barren County, Kentucky, based in Glasgow.

== Schools ==
The Glasgow Independent School District has two elementary schools, one middle school and one high school.

== Elementary schools ==
- South Green Elementary School
- Highland Elementary School

== Middle schools ==
- Glasgow Middle School

== High schools ==
- Glasgow High School
