= Steve Nunn =

American politician (born 1952)

Member of the Kentucky House of Representatives from the 23rd district
- In office January 1, 1991 – January 1, 2007
- Preceded by: Bobby H. Richardson
- Succeeded by: Johnny Bell

Personal details
- Born: November 4, 1952 (age 73) Glasgow, Kentucky, U.S.
- Party: Republican
- Spouse: Tracey L. Damron (divorced)
- Children: 2
- Parent(s): Louie Nunn; Beula Cornelius Aspley Nunn
- Occupation: Politician

Stephen Roberts Nunn (born November 4, 1952) is an American convicted murderer and former politician who served as the Deputy Secretary of Health and Family Services for the Commonwealth of Kentucky.

From 1991 to 2007, he was a Republican member of the Kentucky House of Representatives from his native Barren County in southern Kentucky. In 2011, Nunn received a life sentence without parole after pleading guilty to the murder of his ex-fiancée.

== Early life ==
He is the son of the late Kentucky governor Louie B. Nunn and First Lady Beula Cornelius Aspley Nunn. He graduated from Frankfort High School in 1970, and earned a Bachelor of Arts degree in political science from Transylvania University in 1975. He attended the University of Louisville School of Law, but did not graduate.

== Outside of politics ==
In 1987, Nunn bought into an insurance company in Glasgow. He later became a physician recruiter and consultant for TJ Samson Hospital.

== Political career ==
Nunn was elected to represent the 23rd district in the state's House of Representatives in 1990 after incumbent representative Bobby H. Richardson retired, defeating Democrat Danny J. Basil. The district had precincts in Barren and Metcalfe counties. In 1996, the precincts in Metcalfe County would be replaced by precincts in Warren County. He ran unopposed in 1998, 2000, 2002, and 2004.

While in office, Nunn was known as a relative liberal who championed women, children and the disadvantaged. in 1998, he co-sponsored a law making it a death penalty offense for a person named in a domestic violence protective order to kill the person who was protected by the order. He was an advocate for the Kentucky TeleHealth Network which he helped create with the passage of HB-177 and HB-112 in 2000. The network used electronic medical communications systems to help reach patients in rural settings who couldn't travel. In 2001, he was able to pass a bill that gave children in foster care, and former foster care children, the ability to attend state universities in Kentucky for free. In 2005, he was able to pass a pilot program that used $100,000 in Kentucky Department of Medicaid funding to place telemedicine equipment in fourteen schools and fifteen other sites. These sites could connect with clinics and, it was hoped, reduce school time missed for illnesses and avoid costly emergency room visits.

Nunn unsuccessfully sought the Republican gubernatorial nomination in 2003, finishing third to then-United States Representative Ernie Fletcher of Lexington, whom Nunn then supported. Former State Representative Bob Heleringer, then of Eastwood in suburban Jefferson County, ran as the lieutenant governor selection on Nunn's ticket. In the primary, Nunn received 21,167 votes (13.4 percent), but Fletcher led the four-candidate field with 90,912 (57.3 percent). Rebecca Jackson polled 44,084 (27.8 percent) and Virgil Moore polled 2,365 (1.5 percent). Fletcher went on to win the position in the general election by defeating Democratic Attorney General Ben Chandler, the grandson of Happy Chandler. Fletcher was the first Republican to be elected governor of Kentucky since Louie B. Nunn upset Henry Ward in November 1967.

On November 7, 2006, after nearly 16 years as a state representative, Nunn lost his bid for re-election to the Democrat Johnny Bell. Nunn polled 5,572 votes (46.7 percent) to Bell's 6,371 ballots (53.3 percent).

In September 2007, Nunn announced his support of Democratic gubernatorial nominee Steve Beshear, a former lieutenant governor who handily unseated Fletcher in the Republican's bid for re-election. In November 2007 he was appointed to Beshear's transition team. On December 22, 2007, Beshear appointed Nunn as deputy secretary of Health and Family Services.

== Murder of ex-fiancée ==
In March 2009, Steve Nunn, 56, resigned his state position as deputy secretary for the Health and Family Services Cabinet after having been placed on administrative leave in February as a result of a February 19 assault in Lexington on 29-year-old Amanda Ross, his former fiancée, who had procured a protective order against him for domestic violence.

On September 11, 2009, Ross was found shot to death outside of the Opera House Square complex in Lexington. That same day, Nunn was found by police with his wrists slit in Hart County near the grave sites of his parents. He was arrested and taken to a hospital in Bowling Green, where he was in fair condition from the wounds, which were first considered to be self-inflicted. Nunn was charged with six counts of wanton endangerment of a police officer because when authorities arrived to arrest him, they reported that Nunn had fired a .38-caliber handgun.

On September 14, Nunn was taken to the Hart County jail after having been discharged from the hospital. The same day, Nunn was charged by Lexington police with Ross's murder. On September 17, Nunn was transferred to the Fayette County Detention Center. The next day, he pleaded not guilty to the murder charges in Fayette District Court. On November 10, 2009, Nunn was indicted on charges of murder and violating a protective order. Prosecutors intended to seek the death penalty, but on June 28, 2011, Nunn pleaded guilty in Fayette Circuit Court in Lexington to Ross's murder and received a sentence of life imprisonment without the possibility of parole for the crime. He is currently serving his sentence at the Little Sandy Correctional Complex in Sandy Hook, Kentucky, under Department of Corrections (DOC) ID #246151.

As of November 4, 2014, Nunn was eligible to receive his full state pension of $28,210 annually, based on his legislative and executive department service. State law permits pension benefits to former lawmakers unless they commit a crime while in office as a legislator.

Meanwhile, the Ross family filed a wrongful-death lawsuit against Nunn. In August 2013, a Fayette Circuit Judge ordered Steve Nunn to pay Ross's family more than $24 million for killing her outside her Lexington home in 2009.

The judge ruled Nunn to pay $20 million for punitive damages. The judge also commanded Nunn to pay $23,000 for medical costs, $27,000 for funeral costs, $3 million for Ross's future earning potential, along with pain and suffering to Ross and to the estate at one million dollars.

== Amanda's Law ==
In the months after her daughter's murder, Diana Ross began advocating for the protection of other victims of domestic violence. She wanted to bring more light to domestic-violence, under the title of Amanda's Law. The law was passed in 2010 by the Commonwealth of Kentucky. It increases the use of GPS tracking units to enhance the protection of victims from domestic violence and their past attackers. Diana pointed out the law that passed was not as strong as she advocated for.

It's not effective right now, The judges are not using it yet. And it's my fear that it's going to take another high-profile murder to get their attention.

— Diana Ross, commenting on Amanda's Law.

Judges can invoke the law on a case-by-case basis after a protective order has been violated.

According to the federal Electronic Monitoring Resource Center at Denver University, there are currently 12 states with laws allowing judges to order the wearing of GPS tracking units. The units send an alarm to both the victim and police if the perpetrator enters areas restricted by the protection order.

== Media ==
The investigative television show 20/20 on OWN's episode "Sins of the Son" (Season 3, Episode 52) examines the Steve Nunn case, using the 20/20 story that originally aired September 19, 2013.
