= Jim Callahan (politician) =

American politician

Member of the Kentucky House of Representatives from the 67th district
- In office January 1, 1987 – January 1, 2005
- Preceded by: Terry Mann
- Succeeded by: Dennis Keene

Personal details
- Born: August 21, 1939
- Died: November 30, 2013 (aged 74)
- Party: Democratic

James Patrick Callahan (August 21, 1939 – November 30, 2013) was an American politician from Kentucky who was a member of the Kentucky House of Representatives from 1987 to 2005. Callahan was first elected in 1986 after incumbent representative Terry Mann retired to run for congress against Jim Bunning. He did not seek reelection in 2004 and was succeeded by Dennis Keene.

He died in November 2013.
