= Gross Lindsay =

American politician

Member of the Kentucky House of Representatives from the 11th district
- In office January 1, 1993 – January 1, 2007
- Preceded by: A. G. Pritchett
- Succeeded by: David Watkins
- In office January 1, 1970 – January 1, 1980
- Preceded by: John Stanley Hoffman
- Succeeded by: David Thomason

Personal details
- Born: December 11, 1930
- Died: June 25, 2008 (aged 77)
- Party: Democratic

Gross Clay Lindsay (December 11, 1930 – June 25, 2008) was an American politician from Kentucky who was a member of the Kentucky House of Representatives from 1970 to 1980 and again from 1993 to 2007. Lindsay was first elected in 1969 after incumbent representative John Stanley Hoffman was appointed to be County Judge of Henderson County. He did not seek reelection in 1979. Lindsay ran for the house again in 1992 and served until his defeat for renomination by David Watkins in 2006. Lindsay attributed his defeat to voters' desire for change, as the mayor of Henderson and the county sheriff were also defeated in their primary elections.

Lindsay died in June 2008 at age 77.
