= Jim Lovell (politician) =

American politician

Member of the Kentucky House of Representatives from the 72nd district
- In office January 1, 1995 – January 1, 1999
- Preceded by: Jim LeMaster
- Succeeded by: Carolyn Belcher

Personal details
- Party: Democratic

Jim Lovell (born 1950) is an American politician from Kentucky who was a member of the Kentucky House of Representatives from 1995 to 1999. Lovell was first elected in 1994 after incumbent representative Jim LeMaster retired. He was defeated for renomination in 1998 by Carolyn Belcher.
