= Robby Mills =

American politician (born 1967)

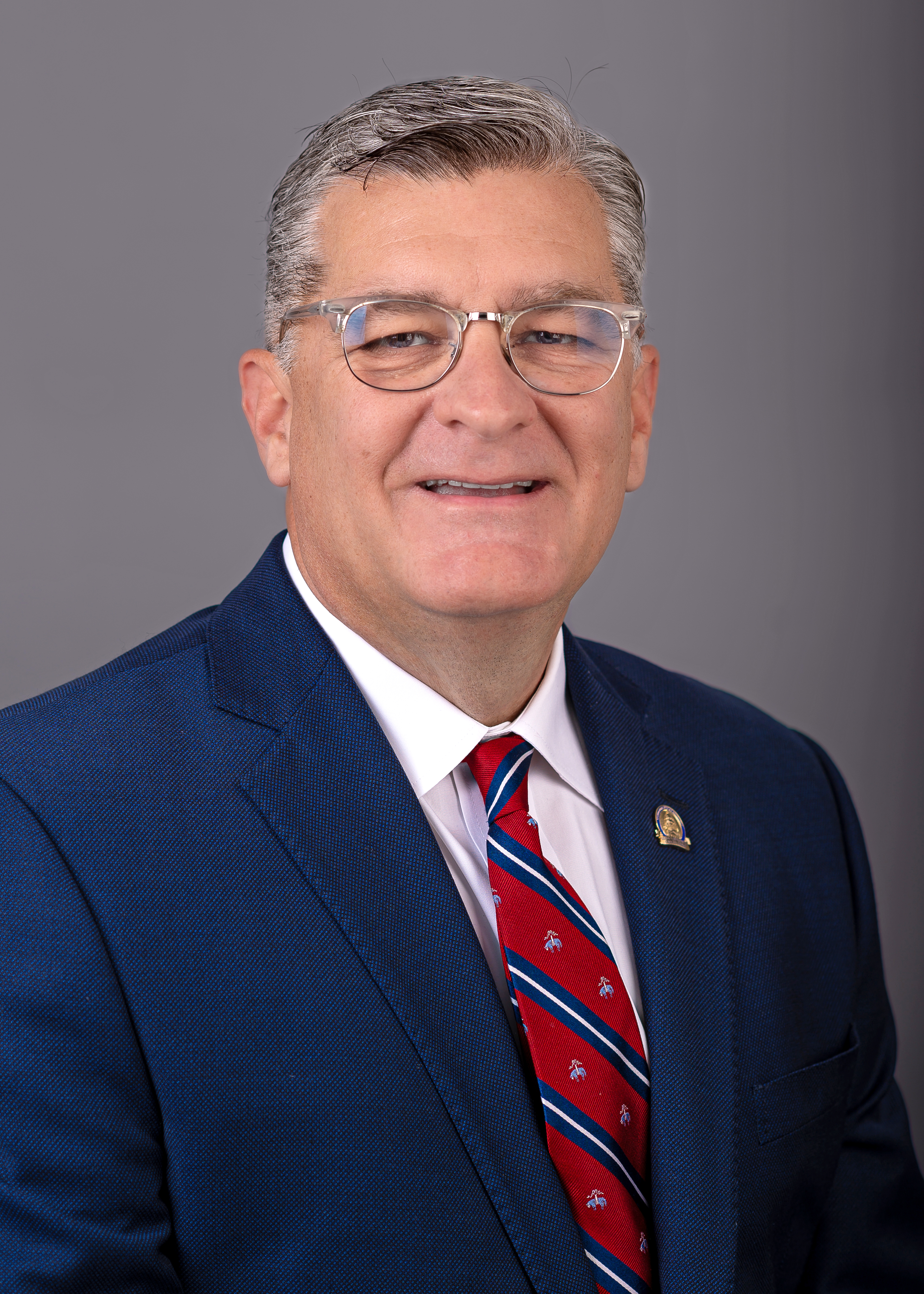
- Official portrait, 2025

Member of the Kentucky Senate from the 4th district
- Incumbent
- Assumed office January 1, 2019
- Preceded by: Dorsey Ridley

Member of the Kentucky House of Representatives from the 11th district
- In office January 1, 2017 – January 1, 2019
- Preceded by: David Watkins
- Succeeded by: Rob Wiederstein

Personal details
- Born: March 17, 1967 (age 59) Henderson, Kentucky, U.S.
- Party: Republican
- Spouse: Vickie
- Education: Oral Roberts University (BA)

Robert Martin Mills (born March 17, 1967) is an American politician who has served in the Kentucky Senate from the 4th district since 2019. He previously served in the Kentucky House of Representatives from the 11th district from 2017 to 2019, after defeating incumbent David Watkins in 2016. Mills was elected to the senate in 2018, defeating incumbent Democratic senator Dorsey Ridley. He was Daniel Cameron's running mate in their unsuccessful campaign in the 2023 Kentucky gubernatorial election.

Party political offices
Preceded by Ralph Alvarado	Republican nominee for Lieutenant Governor of Kentucky; 2023	Most recent
