= Glasgow Transit =

Provider of mass transportation in Barren County, Kentucky

- Headquarters: 310 West Front Street
- Locale: Glasgow, Kentucky
- Service area: Barren County, Kentucky
- Service type: Bus service, paratransit
- Routes: 1
- Hubs: Glasgow Transit Center/Department of Public Works
- Fleet: 2 buses
- Annual ridership: 8,075 (2019)
- Website: Glasgow Transit

Glasgow Transit is the primary provider of mass transportation in Glasgow, Kentucky with one route serving the region. As of 2019, the system provided 8,075 rides over 3,023 annual vehicle revenue hours with 2 buses.

== History ==
In 2022 and 2023, Glasgow Transit expanded service to include service later in the day, as well as providing abbreviated service on four federal holidays.

== Service ==
Glasgow Transit operates a single deviated fixed-route operating in a loop around the city. Hours of operation for the system are Monday through Friday from 6:45 A.M. to 6:30 P.M. There is no service on Saturdays and Sundays. The service is provided for free.

== Ridership ==
The ridership statistics shown here are of deviated fixed route services only and do not include demand response services.

== See also ==
- List of bus transit systems in the United States
