= Jim LeMaster =

American politician

Majority Leader of the Kentucky House of Representatives
- In office January 5, 1982 – January 8, 1985
- Preceded by: Bobby H. Richardson
- Succeeded by: Greg Stumbo

Member of the Kentucky House of Representatives from the 72nd district
- In office January 1, 1976 – January 1, 1995
- Preceded by: Ted Kuster
- Succeeded by: Jim Lovell

Personal details
- Party: Democratic

James G. LeMaster (born 1946) is an American politician from Kentucky who was a member of the Kentucky House of Representatives from 1976 to 1995. LeMaster was first elected in 1975, defeating incumbent Republican representative Ted Kuster for reelection. He did not seek reelection in 1994.
