= J. T. Payne =

American politician

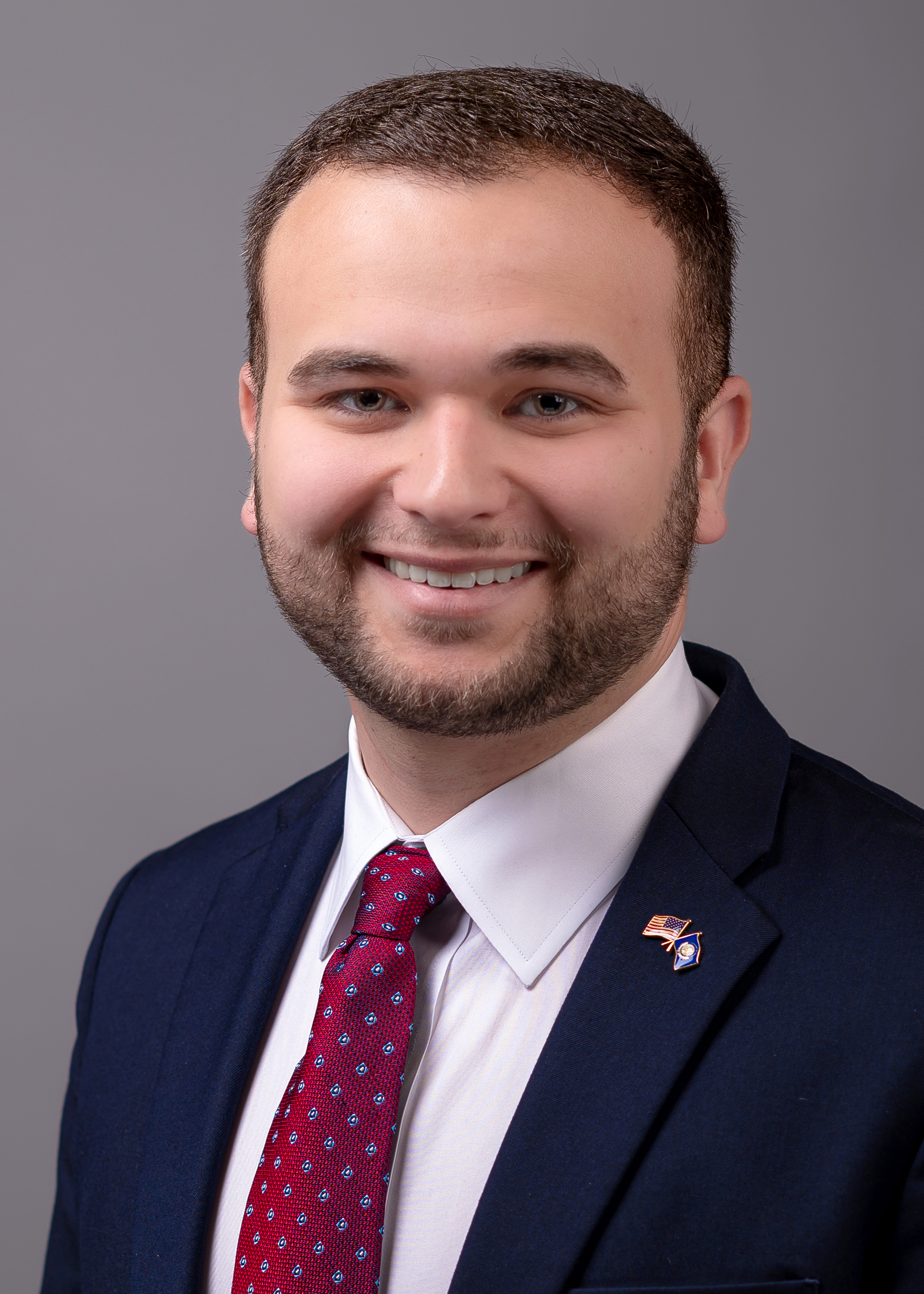
- Official portrait, 2025

Member of the Kentucky House of Representatives from the 11th district
- Incumbent
- Assumed office January 1, 2025
- Preceded by: Jonathan Dixon

Personal details
- Born: June 12, 1998 (age 28) Reed, Kentucky
- Party: Republican
- Education: Murray State University (BS, M.A.Ed)
- Occupation: Educator

James Thomas Payne (born June 12, 1998) is an American politician and member of the Kentucky House of Representatives from Kentucky's 11th House district, and assumed office on January 1, 2025. His district includes all of Henderson County. Born in 1998, he is currently the youngest member of the Kentucky General Assembly.

== Background ==
Payne was raised in Reed, Kentucky, an unincorporated community located in Henderson County. He graduated from Henderson County High School in 2016, and went on to earn a Bachelor of Science in Agriculture from Murray State University in 2019. During his time at Murray, Payne was elected student body president, and served as the student representative on the university's board of regents as well as chair of the Kentucky Board of Student Body Presidents. Following graduation, he was hired by Henderson County High School. He returned to Murray and earned a Master of Arts in Education in teacher leadership in 2021 as well as another M.A.Ed in educational administration in 2024.

Currently, Payne serves as assistant principal for career and technical education at Henderson County High School. Prior to this role, he was an agriculture teacher and advisor to the school's Future Farmers of America chapter.

== Political career ==
Payne entered the 2024 race for Kentucky's 11th House district after incumbent Republican Jonathan Dixon announced that he would leave office at the end of his term.

=== Elections ===
==== 2024 ====
Kentucky House District 11 general election, November 5, 2024
Party	Candidate	Votes	%
Republican	J. T. Payne	14,964	100.0
Total votes		14,964	100.0

==== 2026 ====
Kentucky House District 11 general election, November 3, 2026 (unofficial results)
Party	Candidate	Votes	%
Republican	J. T. Payne (incumbent)	8,449	62.7
Democratic	Janelle Rowena Glass	5,018	37.3
Total votes		13,467	100.0
