= Matt Lehman (Kentucky politician) =

Kentucky politician

Matthew Lehman
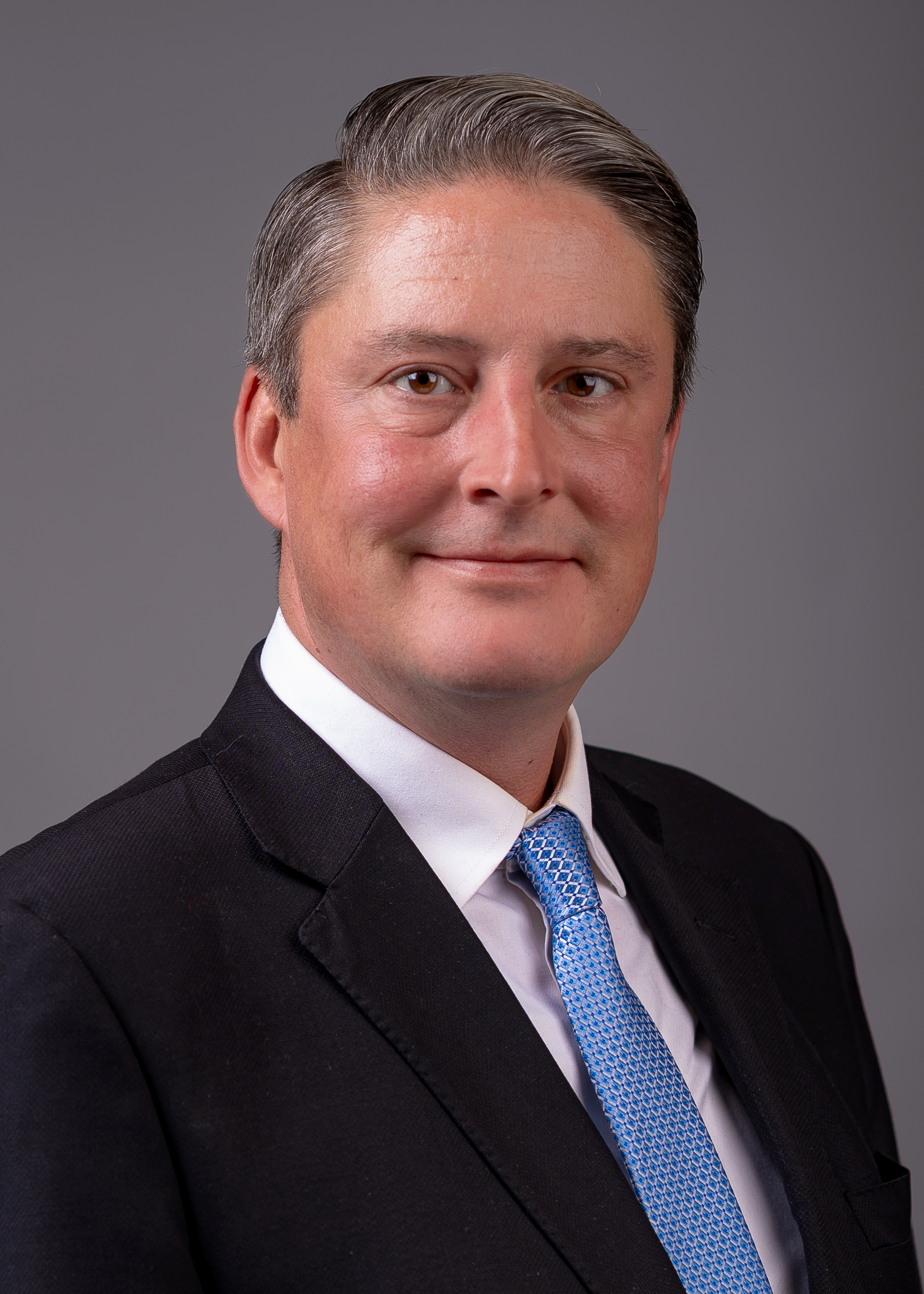

Member of the Kentucky House of Representatives from the 67th district
- Incumbent
- Assumed office January 1, 2025
- Preceded by: Rachel Roberts

Personal details
- Born: Matthew Bryson Lehman; February 27, 1977 (age 49)
- Party: Democratic
- Website: Campaign website

Matthew Bryson Lehman (born February 27, 1977) is an American politician who is a member of the Kentucky House of Representatives. His term began in January 2025. He represents Kentucky's 67th House district, which comprises part of Campbell County.

== Political career ==
In 2022, Lehman unsuccessfully ran for Kentucky's 4th congressional district, losing to incumbent Republican representative Thomas Massie.

Lehman was elected to the Kentucky House of Representatives in the 2024 election following the retirement of incumbent representative Rachel Roberts. He received 50.08 percent of the vote, defeating Republican candidate Terry W. Hatton.

== Electoral history ==
=== 2022 ===
2022 Kentucky's 4th congressional district election
Party	Candidate	Votes	%
Republican	Thomas Massie (incumbent)	167,541	65.0
Democratic	Matthew Lehman	79,977	31.0
Independent	Ethan Keith Osborne	10,111	3.9
Total votes		257,629	100.0
Republican hold			

=== 2024 ===
2024 Kentucky House of Representatives 67th district election
Party	Candidate	Votes	%
Democratic	Matthew Lehman	9,435	50.08
Republican	Terry W. Hatton	9,405	49.92
Total votes		18,840	100.0
Democratic hold			

Kentucky House of Representatives
Preceded by Rachel Roberts	Member of the Kentucky House of Representatives from the 67th district 2025–present	Succeeded by incumbent
