= Dennis Keene =

American politician

Kentucky Commissioner of Local Government
- Incumbent
- Assumed office December 16, 2019
- Governor: Andy Beshear

Member of the Kentucky House of Representatives from the 67th district
- In office January 1, 2005 – December 2019
- Preceded by: Jim Callahan
- Succeeded by: Rachel Roberts

Personal details
- Born: August 17, 1965 (age 60) Dayton, Kentucky
- Party: Democratic

Dennis Keene (born August 17, 1965) is an American politician and a member of the Democratic Party. From 2005 to 2019, he represented District 67 in the Kentucky House of Representatives. He resigned on December 16, 2019, to take a job in Kentucky Governor Andy Beshear's administration as Commissioner of Local Government. District 67 is entirely based in Campbell County, Kentucky, comprising the cities of Dayton, Bellevue, Newport, Wilder, Southgate, Woodlawn, and a portion of Highland Heights.

Keene is anti-abortion.

Keene was a second-term Wilder, Kentucky, city councilman when Jim Callahan, a Democrat who had served the 67th house district for many years, announced his retirement. Keene filed to succeed Callahan to the spot, but so did two other Democrats. One of the other Democrats, Ken Rechtin, a Campbell County Commissioner and former Newport, Ky. city councilman, was favored to win the primary. Keene ran an aggressive primary campaign and ended up collecting 1,052 votes to Rechtin's 957.

With the difficult primary behind him and an endorsement from outgoing popular Democrat Jim Callahan, Keene looked to be a safe bet for the 67th district, which has more registered Democrats than Republicans. He also had the support of all three county commissioners - all three of which were Democrats themselves. The Republicans united behind Wilder lawyer Mark Hayden. Hayden ran an aggressive campaign and had the support of Gov. Ernie Fletcher, both Kentucky U.S. senators and Campbell County Judge-Executive Steve Pendery. Keene drew first blood in the race when he drew attention to the fact that Hayden's law firm, Greenbaum, Doll & McDonald, sponsored a seminar titled "Exploring the Options for Area Manufacturers", which had a brochure that read: "Join us as we will help you discover for yourself the opportunities which China holds. You're invited to explore the 'why's' and 'how's' of setting up manufacturing facilities in China." Keene said this proved Hayden would not bring jobs to the district or state. Hayden said he was not connected with the seminar and didn't agree with sending jobs overseas. Testy moments followed, including an argument between the two after answering questions at Northern Kentucky University. The race was close to the end, with Keene winning by approximately 300 votes out of more than 12,000 cast.

== Elections ==
- 2012 Keene was unopposed for the May 22, 2012 Democratic Primary and won the November 6, 2012 General election with 7,768 votes (59.9%) against Republican nominee Adam Haas.
- 2004 When District 67 Representative Jim Callahan retired and left the seat open, Keene won the three-way 2004 Democratic Primary by 95 votes with 1,052 votes (49.1%) and won the November 2, 2004 General election with 6,665 votes (51.4%) against Republican nominee Mark Hayden.
- 2006 Keene was unopposed for both the 2006 Democratic Primary and the November 7, 2006 General election, winning with 6,249 votes.
- 2008 Keene was unopposed for the 2008 Democratic Primary and won the November 4, 2008 General election with 8,415 votes (69.7%) against Independent candidate Patrick Lucas.
- 2010 Keene was unopposed for the May 18, 2010 Democratic Primary and won the November 2, 2010 General election with 5,042 votes (56.5%) against Republican nominee Roger Thoney.
