= 2020 Kentucky House of Representatives election =

- November 3, 2020

All 100 seats in the Kentucky House of Representatives 51 seats needed for a majority
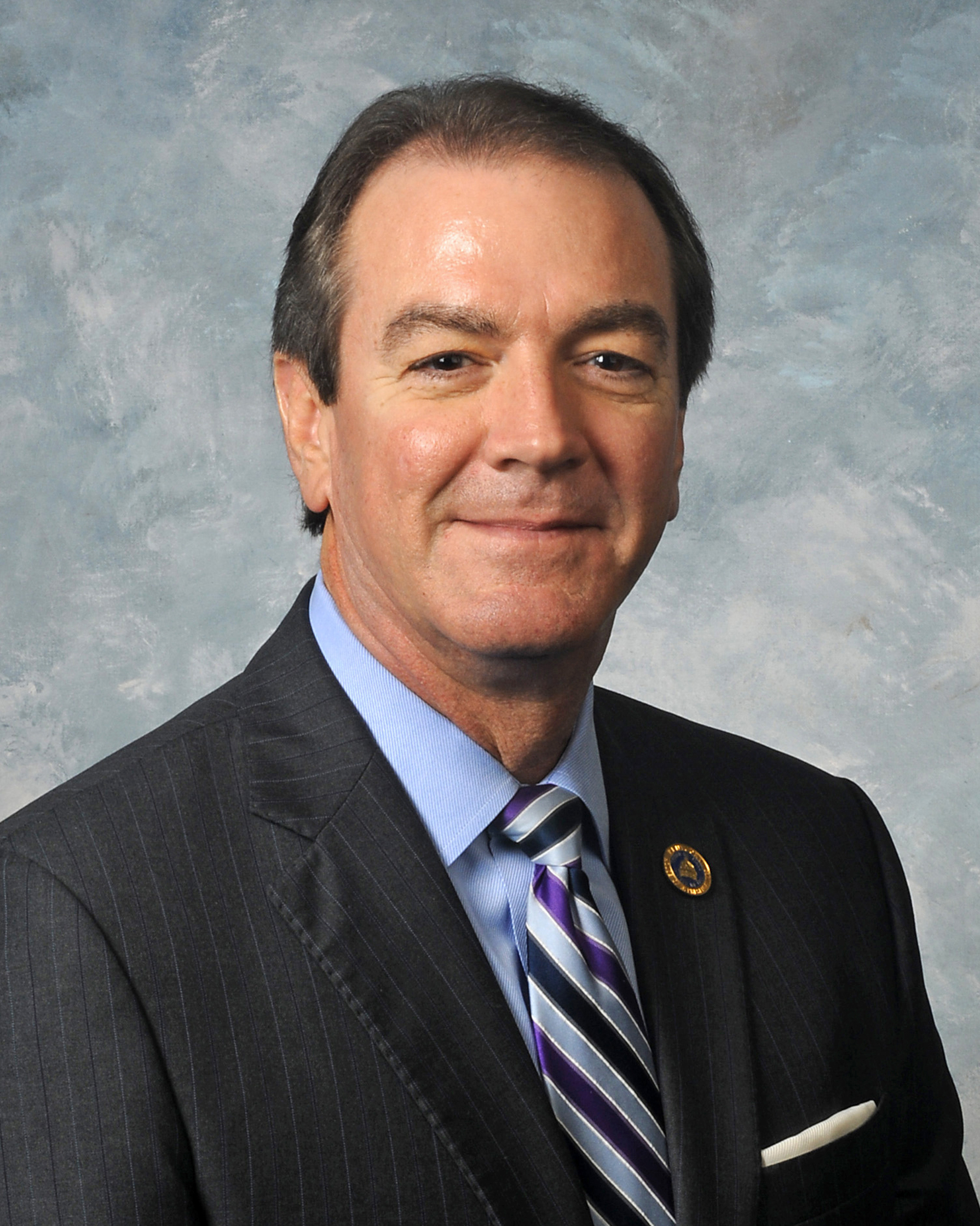

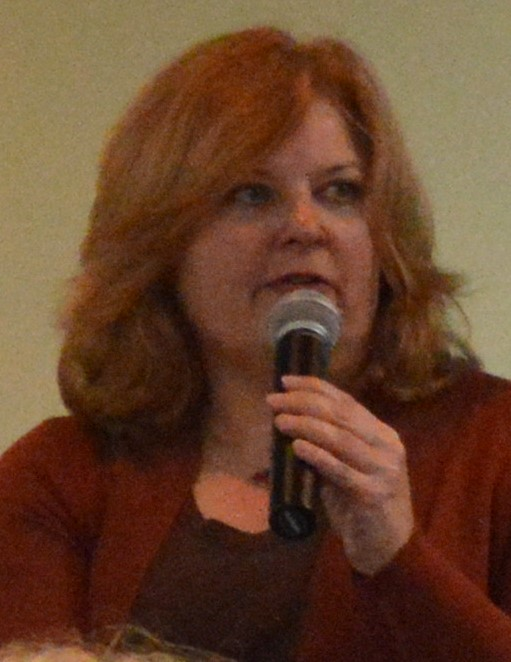
	Majority party	Minority party
Leader	David Osborne	Joni Jenkins
Party	Republican	Democratic
Leader since	January 8, 2018	December 20, 2019
Leader's seat	59th	44th
Last election	61	39
Seats before	62	38
Seats won	75	25
Seat change	▲13	▼13
Popular vote	1,225,446	706,246
Percentage	62.64%	36.10%
Swing	▲9.27%	▼9.71%
- Results: Democratic hold Republican hold Republican gain
Speaker before election
David Osborne
Republican
Elected Speaker
David Osborne
Republican

Elections to the Kentucky House of Representatives were held on November 3, 2020.

== Predictions ==
Source	Ranking	As of
The Cook Political Report	Safe R	October 21, 2020

== Closest races ==
Seats where the margin of victory was under 10%:

1. District 45, 2.2%
2. District 48, 2.2% gain
3. District 88, 3%
4. District 10, 4.2% gain
5. District 56, 4.6%
6. District 67, 5.6%
7. District 13, 7.4% gain
8. District 32, 7.4%
9. District 11, 8% gain
10. District 33, 8.2%
11. District 100, 8.8% gain
12. District 37, 9%
13. District 8, 9.6%

== Special elections ==
=== District 18 special ===
Samara Heavrin was elected on November 5, 2019, to fill the vacancy caused by the resignation of Tim Moore in September 2019.

2019 Kentucky House of Representatives 18th district special election
Party	Candidate	Votes	%
Republican	Samara Heavrin	8,655	60.3
Democratic	Becky Miller	5,701	39.7
Total votes		14,356	100.0
Republican hold			

=== District 63 special ===
Kim Banta was elected on November 5, 2019, to fill the vacancy caused by the resignation of Diane St. Onge in July 2019.

2019 Kentucky House of Representatives 63rd district special election
Party	Candidate	Votes	%
Republican	Kim Banta	10,921	63.1
Democratic	Josh Blair	6,385	36.9
Total votes		17,306	100.0
Republican hold			

=== District 67 special ===
Rachel Roberts was elected on February 25, 2020, to fill the vacancy caused by the resignation of Dennis Keene in December 2019.

2020 Kentucky House of Representatives 67th district special election
Party	Candidate	Votes	%
Democratic	Rachel Roberts	2,955	64.2
Republican	Mary Jo Wedding	1,649	35.8
Total votes		4,604	100.0
Democratic hold			

=== District 99 special ===
Richard White was elected on February 25, 2020, to fill the vacancy caused by the resignation of Rocky Adkins in December 2019.

2020 Kentucky House of Representatives 99th district special election
Party	Candidate	Votes	%
Republican	Richard White	4,750	56.0
Democratic	William H. Redwine	3,731	44.0
Total votes		8,481	100.0
Republican gain from Democratic			

== Results ==
=== District 1 ===
District 1
Party	Candidate	Votes	%
Republican	Steven Rudy (incumbent)	17,836	100.0%
Total votes		17,836	100.0%
Republican hold			

=== District 2 ===
District 2
Party	Candidate	Votes	%
Republican	Richard Heath (incumbent)	15,484	83.2%
Libertarian	Joshua Gilpin	3,118	16.8%
Total votes		18,602	100.0%
Republican hold			

=== District 3 ===
District 3
Party	Candidate	Votes	%
Republican	Randy Bridges (incumbent)	11,334	59.9%
Democratic	Corbin Snardon	7,593	40.1%
Total votes		18,927	100.0%
Republican hold			

=== District 4 ===
District 4
Party	Candidate	Votes	%
Republican	Lynn Bechler (incumbent)	14,696	72.6%
Democratic	Alonzo Pennington	4,565	22.6%
Independent	Austin Valentine Jr.	979	4.8%
Total votes		20,240	100.0%
Republican hold			

=== District 5 ===
District 5
Party	Candidate	Votes	%
Republican	Mary Beth Imes	14,855	68.8%
Democratic	Shannon Davis Roberts	6,726	31.2%
Total votes		21,581	100.0%
Republican hold			

=== District 6 ===
District 6
Party	Candidate	Votes	%
Republican	Chris Freeland (incumbent)	16,562	71.9%
Democratic	Al Cunningham	6,487	28.1%
Total votes		23,049	100.0%
Republican hold			

=== District 7 ===
District 7
Party	Candidate	Votes	%
Republican	Suzanne Miles (incumbent)	18,847	100.0%
Total votes		18,847	100.0%

=== District 8 ===
District 8
Party	Candidate	Votes	%
Republican	Walker Thomas (incumbent)	7,303	54.8%
Democratic	Pam Dossett	6,023	45.2%
Total votes		13,326	100.0%
Republican hold			

=== District 9 ===
District 9
Party	Candidate	Votes	%
Republican	Myron Dossett (incumbent)	13,244	100.0%
Total votes		13,244	100.0%
Republican hold			

=== District 10 ===
District 10
Party	Candidate	Votes	%
Republican	Josh Calloway	11,624	52.1%
Democratic	Dean Schamore (incumbent)	10,692	47.9%
Total votes		22,316	100.0%
Republican gain from Democratic			

=== District 11 ===
District 11
Party	Candidate	Votes	%
Republican	Jonathan Dixon	10,825	54.0%
Democratic	Rob Wiederstein (incumbent)	9,223	46.0%
Total votes		20,048	100.0%
Republican gain from Democratic			

=== District 12 ===
District 12
Party	Candidate	Votes	%
Republican	Jim Gooch Jr. (incumbent)	16,891	76.5%
Democratic	Arthur "Art" Mclaughlin	5,177	23.5%
Total votes		22,068	100.0%
Republican hold			

=== District 13 ===
District 13
Party	Candidate	Votes	%
Republican	DJ Johnson	9,485	53.7%
Democratic	Jim Glenn (incumbent)	8,167	46.3%
Total votes		17,652	100.0%
Republican gain from Democratic			

=== District 14 ===
District 14
Party	Candidate	Votes	%
Republican	Scott Lewis	19,304	100.0%
Total votes		19,304	100.0%
Republican hold			

=== District 15 ===
District 15
Party	Candidate	Votes	%
Republican	Melinda Gibbons Prunty (incumbent)	13,423	67.4%
Democratic	Crystal Chappell	6,485	32.6%
Total votes		19,908	100.0%
Republican hold			

=== District 16 ===
District 16
Party	Candidate	Votes	%
Republican	Jason Petrie (incumbent)	15,585	100.0%
Total votes		15,858	100.0%
Republican hold			

=== District 17 ===
District 17
Party	Candidate	Votes	%
Republican	Steve Sheldon (incumbent)	21,348	100.0%
Total votes		21,348	100.0%
Republican hold			

=== District 18 ===
District 18
Party	Candidate	Votes	%
Republican	Samara Heavrin (incumbent)	16,409	83.0%
Libertarian	Jacob Clark	3,354	17.0%
Total votes		19,763	100.0%
Republican hold			

=== District 19 ===
District 19
Party	Candidate	Votes	%
Republican	Michael Meredith (incumbent)	14,638	69.4%
Democratic	Daniel Wayne Johnson	6,469	30.6%
Total votes		21,107	100.0%
Republican hold			

=== District 20 ===
District 20
Party	Candidate	Votes	%
Democratic	Patti Minter (incumbent)	9,568	69.9%
Independent	Leanette Lopez	4,114	30.1%
Total votes		13,682	100.0%
Democratic hold			

=== District 21 ===
District 21
Party	Candidate	Votes	%
Republican	Bart Rowland (incumbent)	15,433	80.5%
Democratic	John W. Pennington	3,734	19.5%
Total votes		19,167	100.0%
Republican hold			

=== District 22 ===
District 22
Party	Candidate	Votes	%
Republican	Shawn McPherson	14,517	69.3%
Democratic	David R. Young	6,427	30.7%
Total votes		20,944	100.0%
Republican gain from Democratic			

=== District 23 ===
District 23
Party	Candidate	Votes	%
Republican	Steve Riley (incumbent)	15,398	77.1%
Democratic	Steve Jones	4,226	21.2%
Libertarian	Tim Filback	354	1.8%
Total votes		19,978	100.0%
Republican hold			

=== District 24 ===
District 24
Party	Candidate	Votes	%
Republican	Brandon Reed (incumbent)	14,326	65.9%
Democratic	Terry Mills	7,406	34.1%
Total votes		21,732	100.0%
Republican hold			

=== District 25 ===
District 25
Party	Candidate	Votes	%
Republican	Jim DuPlessis (incumbent)	16,968	100.0%
Total votes		16,968	100.0%
Republican hold			

=== District 26 ===
District 26
Party	Candidate	Votes	%
Republican	Russell Webber (incumbent)	15,590	80.3%
Libertarian	Randall Daniel	3,818	19.7%
Total votes		19,408	100.0%
Republican hold			

=== District 27 ===
District 27
Party	Candidate	Votes	%
Republican	Nancy Tate (incumbent)	11,179	58.3%
Democratic	Brian T. Chism	7,998	41.7%
Total votes		19,177	100.0%
Republican hold			

=== District 28 ===
District 28
Party	Candidate	Votes	%
Democratic	Charles Miller (incumbent)	12,187	100.0%
Total votes		12,187	100.0%
Democratic hold			

=== District 29 ===
District 29
Party	Candidate	Votes	%
Republican	Kevin Bratcher (incumbent)	15,298	55.6%
Democratic	Suzanne Kugler	12,201	44.4%
Total votes		27,499	100.0%
Republican hold			

=== District 30 ===
District 30
Party	Candidate	Votes	%
Democratic	Tom Burch (incumbent)	14,521	100.0%
Total votes		14,521	100.0%
Democratic hold			

=== District 31 ===
District 31
Party	Candidate	Votes	%
Democratic	Josie Raymond (incumbent)	15,775	100.0%
Total votes		15,775	100.0%
Democratic hold			

=== District 32 ===
District 32
Party	Candidate	Votes	%
Democratic	Tina Bojanowski (incumbent)	13,047	53.7%
Republican	G. Hunt Rounsavall Jr.	11,244	46.3%
Total votes		24,291	100.0%
Democratic hold			

=== District 33 ===
District 33
Party	Candidate	Votes	%
Republican	Jason Nemes (incumbent)	15,186	54.1%
Democratic	Margaret S. Plattner	12,861	45.9%
Total votes		27,967	100.0%
Republican hold			

=== District 34 ===
District 34
Party	Candidate	Votes	%
Democratic	Mary Lou Marzian	21,263	100.0%
Total votes		21,263	100.0%
Democratic hold			

=== District 35 ===
District 35
Party	Candidate	Votes	%
Democratic	Lisa Willner (incumbent)	14,224	100.0%
Total votes		14,224	100.0%
Democratic hold			

=== District 36 ===
District 36
Party	Candidate	Votes	%
Republican	Jerry T. Miller (incumbent)	20,480	60.6%
Democratic	Jeff Grammer	13,293	39.4%
Total votes		33,773	100.0%
Republican hold			

=== District 37 ===
District 37
Party	Candidate	Votes	%
Democratic	Jeffery Donohue (incumbent)	8,661	54.5%
Republican	Jimmy Maricle	7,238	45.5%
Total votes		15,899	100.0%
Democratic hold			

=== District 38 ===
District 38
Party	Candidate	Votes	%
Democratic	McKenzie Cantrell (incumbent)	10,779	100.0%
Total votes		10,779	100.0%
Democratic hold			

=== District 39 ===
District 39
Party	Candidate	Votes	%
Republican	Matt Lockett	13,485	61.1%
Democratic	Carolyn Dupont	8,574	38.9%
Total votes		22,059	100.0%
Republican gain from Democratic			

=== District 40 ===
District 40
Party	Candidate	Votes	%
Democratic	Nima Kulkarni (incumbent)	12,446	100.0%
Total votes		12,446	100.0%
Democratic hold			

=== District 41 ===
District 41
Party	Candidate	Votes	%
Democratic	Attica Scott (incumbent)	13,993	100.0%
Total votes		13,993	100.0%
Democratic hold			

=== District 42 ===
District 42
Party	Candidate	Votes	%
Democratic	Reginald Meeks (incumbent)	17,917	100.0%
Total votes		17,917	100.0%
Democratic hold			

=== District 43 ===
District 43
Party	Candidate	Votes	%
Democratic	Pamela Stevenson	14,825	100.0%
Total votes		14,825	100.0%
Democratic hold			

=== District 44 ===
District 44
Party	Candidate	Votes	%
Democratic	Joni Jenkins	14,205	100.0%
Total votes		14,205	100.0%
Democratic hold			

=== District 45 ===
District 45
Party	Candidate	Votes	%
Republican	Killian Timoney	14,236	51.1%
Democratic	Shirley Flynn Mitchell	13,626	48.9%
Total votes		27,862	100.0%
Republican hold			

=== District 46 ===
District 46
Party	Candidate	Votes	%
Democratic	Al Gentry (incumbent)	11,470	59.6%
Republican	Bob DeVore	7,787	40.4%
Total votes		19,257	100.0%
Democratic hold			

=== District 47 ===
District 47
Party	Candidate	Votes	%
Republican	Felicia Rabourn	13,953	69.4%
Democratic	Jack Couch	6,163	30.6%
Total votes		20,116	100.0%
Republican gain from Democratic			

=== District 48 ===
District 48
Party	Candidate	Votes	%
Republican	Ken Fleming	15,677	51.1%
Democratic	Maria Sorolis (incumbent)	15,014	48.9%
Total votes		30,691	100.0%
Republican gain from Democratic			

=== District 49 ===
District 49
Party	Candidate	Votes	%
Republican	Thomas Huff	15,828	72.6%
Democratic	Jonathan Cacciatore	5,339	24.5%
Libertarian	Mitch Rushing	639	2.9%
Total votes		21,806	100.0%
Republican hold			

=== District 50 ===
District 50
Party	Candidate	Votes	%
Republican	Chat McCoy (incumbent)	16,695	73.3%
Democratic	Kory Miller	6,074	26.7%
Total votes		22,769	100.0%
Republican hold			

=== District 51 ===
District 51
Party	Candidate	Votes	%
Republican	John "Bam" Carney (incumbent)	16,461	78.6%
Democratic	Richard Steele	4,492	21.4%
Total votes		20,953	100.0%
Republican hold			

=== District 52 ===
District 52
Party	Candidate	Votes	%
Republican	Ken UpChurch (incumbent)	16,375	100.0%
Total votes		16,375	100.0%
Republican hold			

=== District 53 ===
District 53
Party	Candidate	Votes	%
Republican	James Tipton	20,087	76.6%
Democratic	Dustin Burley	6,126	23.4%
Total votes		26,213	100.0%
Republican hold			

=== District 54 ===
District 54
Party	Candidate	Votes	%
Republican	Daniel Elliott (incumbent)	14,144	66.5%
Democratic	Lydia Coffey	7,141	33.5%
Total votes		21,285	100.0%
Republican hold			

=== District 55 ===
District 55
Party	Candidate	Votes	%
Republican	Kim King (incumbent)	20,375	99.8%
Write-In	Dylan Franz	46	0.2%
Total votes		20,421	100.0%
Republican hold			

=== District 56 ===
District 56
Party	Candidate	Votes	%
Republican	Daniel Fister	12,487	52.3%
Democratic	Lamar Allen	11,375	47.7%
Total votes		23,862	100.0%
Republican hold			

=== District 57 ===
District 57
Party	Candidate	Votes	%
Democratic	Derrick Graham	13,202	61.4%
Republican	Gary Reed Stratton	8,301	38.6%
Total votes		21,503	100.0%
Democratic hold			

=== District 58 ===
District 58
Party	Candidate	Votes	%
Republican	Jennifer Decker	15,263	65.7%
Democratic	Will Barnett	7,983	34.3%
Total votes		23,246	100.0%
Republican hold			

=== District 59 ===
District 59
Party	Candidate	Votes	%
Republican	David Osborne (incumbent)	21,687	100.0%
Total votes		21,687	100.0%
Republican hold			

=== District 60 ===
District 60
Party	Candidate	Votes	%
Republican	Sal Santoro (incumbent)	23,703	100.0%
Total votes		23,703	100.0%
Republican hold			

=== District 61 ===
District 61
Party	Candidate	Votes	%
Republican	Savannah Maddox (incumbent)	20,460	98.7%
Write-In	Debby Lucas Angel	279	1.3%
Total votes		20,739	100.0%
Republican hold			

=== District 62 ===
District 62
Party	Candidate	Votes	%
Republican	Phillip Pratt (incumbent)	17,470	69.0%
Democratic	David Mayo	7,854	31.0%
Total votes		25,324	100.0%
Republican hold			

=== District 63 ===
District 63
Party	Candidate	Votes	%
Republican	Kim Banta (incumbent)	17,344	67.7%
Democratic	Ashley Williams	8,287	32.3%
Total votes		25,631	100.0%
Republican hold			

=== District 64 ===
District 64
Party	Candidate	Votes	%
Republican	Kimberly Poore Moser (incumbent)	18,612	72.5%
Democratic	Larry Varney	7,069	27.5%
Total votes		25,681	100.0%
Republican hold			

=== District 65 ===
District 65
Party	Candidate	Votes	%
Democratic	Charles "Buddy" Wheatley (incumbent)	9,446	60.5%
Republican	J. Davis	6,173	39.5%
Total votes		15,619	100.0%
Democratic hold			

=== District 66 ===
District 66
Party	Candidate	Votes	%
Republican	C. Ed Massey (incumbent)	17,872	68.9%
Democratic	Roberto Henriquez	6,714	25.9%
Libertarian	Cristi Kendrick	1,341	5.2%
Total votes		25,927	100.0%
Republican hold			

=== District 67 ===
District 67
Party	Candidate	Votes	%
Democratic	Rachel Roberts	9,009	52.3%
Republican	LeAnna Homandberg	8,034	46.7%
Write-In	Mark Schroer	174	1.0%
Total votes		17,217	100.0%
Democratic hold			

=== District 68 ===
District 68
Party	Candidate	Votes	%
Republican	Joseph Fischer (incumbent)	19,122	67.1%
Democratic	Nancy Bardgett	9,358	32.9%
Total votes		28,480	100.0%
Republican hold			

=== District 69 ===
District 69
Party	Candidate	Votes	%
Republican	Adam Koenig (incumbent)	11,720	59.9%
Democratic	Ryan Neaves	6,967	35.6%
Libertarian	Bill Mitchell	884	4.5%
Total votes		19,571	100.0%
Republican hold			

=== District 70 ===
District 70
Party	Candidate	Votes	%
Republican	William Lawerence	12,999	64.6%
Democratic	Craig Miller	7,133	35.4%
Total votes		20,132	100.0%
Republican gain from Democratic			

=== District 71 ===
District 71
Party	Candidate	Votes	%
Republican	Josh Bray	19,879	100.0%
Total votes		19,879	100.0%
Republican hold			

=== District 72 ===
Republican Party of Kentucky
Party	Candidate	Votes	%
Republican	Matthew Koch (incumbent)	13,268	65.4%
Democratic	Todd Neace	7,024	34.6%
Total votes		20,292	100.0%
Republican hold			

=== District 73 ===
District 73
Party	Candidate	Votes	%
Republican	Ryan Dotson	11,923	56.9%
Democratic	Kenny Blair	6,441	30.7%
Write-In	Jada Brady	2,589	12.4%
Total votes		20,953	100.0%
Republican hold			

=== District 74 ===
District 74
Party	Candidate	Votes	%
Republican	David Hale (incumbent)	15,230	72.4%
Democratic	Jeff Spradling	5,814	27.6%
Total votes		21,044	100.0%
Republican hold			

=== District 75 ===
District 75
Party	Candidate	Votes	%
Democratic	Kelly Flood (incumbent)	13,070	100.0%
Total votes		13,070	100.0%
Democratic hold			

=== District 76 ===
District 76
Party	Candidate	Votes	%
Democratic	Ruth Ann Palumbo (incumbent)	16,159	100.0%
Total votes		16,159	100.0%
Democratic hold			

=== District 77 ===
District 77
Party	Candidate	Votes	%
Democratic	George Brown Jr. (incumbent)	15,052	100.0%
Total votes		15,052	100.0%
Democratic hold			

=== District 78 ===
District 78
Party	Candidate	Votes	%
Republican	Mark Hart (incumbent)	14,392	83.1%
Libertarian	James Toller	2,922	16.9%
Total votes		17,314	100.0%
Republican hold			

=== District 79 ===
District 79
Party	Candidate	Votes	%
Democratic	Susan Westrom (incumbent)	13,866	63.9%
Republican	Jon Larson	7,838	36.1%
Total votes		21,704	100.0%
Democratic hold			

=== District 80 ===
District 80
Party	Candidate	Votes	%
Republican	David Meade (incumbent)	16,393	100.0%
Total votes		16,393	100.0%
Republican hold			

=== District 81 ===
District 81
Party	Candidate	Votes	%
Republican	Deanna Frazier (incumbent)	12,019	56.9%
Democratic	Mike Eaves	9,100	43.1%
Total votes		21,119	100.0%
Republican hold			

=== District 82 ===
District 82
Party	Candidate	Votes	%
Republican	Regina Huff (incumbent)	17,139	100.0%
Total votes		17,139	100.0%
Republican hold			

=== District 83 ===
District 83
Party	Candidate	Votes	%
Republican	Josh Branscum	19,498	100.0%
Total votes		19,498	100.0%
Republican hold			

=== District 84 ===
District 84
Party	Candidate	Votes	%
Republican	Chris Fugate (incumbent)	12,098	73.5%
Democratic	Kenneth R. Hall	4,356	26.5%
Total votes		16,454	100.0%
Republican hold			

=== District 85 ===
District 85
Party	Candidate	Votes	%
Republican	Shane Baker	18,706	100.0%
Total votes		18,706	100.0%
Republican hold			

=== District 86 ===
District 86
Party	Candidate	Votes	%
Republican	Tom Smith	16,677	100.0%
Total votes		16,677	100.0%
Republican hold			

=== District 87 ===
District 87
Party	Candidate	Votes	%
Republican	Adam Bowling (incumbent)	12,581	100.0%
Total votes		12,581	100.0%
Republican hold			

=== District 88 ===
District 88
Party	Candidate	Votes	%
Democratic	Cherlynn Stevenson (incumbent)	16,025	51.5%
Republican	Aaron Yates	15,093	48.5%
Total votes		31,118	100.0%
Democratic hold			

=== District 89 ===
District 89
Party	Candidate	Votes	%
Republican	Robert Goforth (incumbent)	14,995	70.9%
Democratic	Mike VanWinkle	6,030	28.5%
Write-In	Stacy C. Abner	134	0.6%
Write-In	Philip Eric Robinson	1	0.0%
Total votes		21,160	100.0%
Republican hold			

=== District 90 ===
District 90
Party	Candidate	Votes	%
Republican	Derek Lewis (incumbent)	12,656	74.4%
Democratic	Ralph Hoskin	4,361	25.6%
Total votes		17,017	100.0%
Republican hold			

=== District 91 ===
District 91
Party	Candidate	Votes	%
Republican	Bill Wesley	12,274	70.8%
Democratic	Paula Clemons-Combs	5,073	29.2%
Total votes		17,347	100.0%
Republican gain from Democratic			

=== District 92 ===
District 92
Party	Candidate	Votes	%
Republican	John Blanton (incumbent)	11,447	71.6%
Democratic	Ancel Smith	4,531	28.4%
Total votes		15,978	100.0%
Republican hold			

=== District 93 ===
District 93
Party	Candidate	Votes	%
Republican	Norma Kirk-McCormick	9,045	63.1%
Democratic	Rod Varney	5,289	36.9%
Total votes		14,334	100.0%
Republican gain from Democratic			

=== District 94 ===
District 94
Party	Candidate	Votes	%
Democratic	Angie Hatton (incumbent)	10,531	100.0%
Total votes		10,531	100.0%
Democratic hold			

=== District 95 ===
District 95
Party	Candidate	Votes	%
Democratic	Ashley Tackett Laferty (incumbent)	10,720	60.0%
Republican	William Matt Reynolds	7,149	40.0%
Total votes		17,869	100.0%
Democratic hold			

=== District 96 ===
District 96
Party	Candidate	Votes	%
Republican	Patrick Flannery	12,592	68.6%
Democratic	Kathy Hinkle (incumbent)	5,759	31.4%
Total votes		18,351	100.0%
Republican gain from Democratic			

=== District 97 ===
District 97
Party	Candidate	Votes	%
Republican	Bobby McCool (incumbent)	14,459	78.5%
Democratic	Will Hurst	3,971	21.5%
Total votes		18,430	100.0%
Republican hold			

=== District 98 ===
District 98
Party	Candidate	Votes	%
Republican	Danny Bentley (incumbent)	16,536	100.0%
Total votes		16,536	100.0%
Republican hold			

=== District 99 ===
District 99
Party	Candidate	Votes	%
Republican	Richard White (incumbent)	12,101	64.6%
Democratic	William H. "Bill" Redwine	6,629	35.4%
Total votes		18,730	100.0%
Republican hold			

=== District 100 ===
District 100
Party	Candidate	Votes	%
Republican	Scott Sharp	10,558	54.4%
Democratic	Terri Clark (incumbent)	8,865	45.6%
Total votes		19,423	100.0%
Republican gain from Democratic			
