= Barren County Schools =

Public school district in Barren County, Kentucky

Address
- 600 Trojan Way Glasgow, Kentucky, 42141; United States

District information
- Grades: K - 12
- Established: 1973
- Superintendent: Amy Irwin

Students and staff
- District mascot: Trojans

Other information
- Telephone: (270) 651-3787
- Fax: (270) 651-8836
- Website: barren.kyschools.us

Barren County Schools is a public school district in Barren County, Kentucky, United States, based in Glasgow, Kentucky.

== Schools ==
The Barren County School District has seven elementary schools, one middle school and two high schools.

=== Elementary schools ===
- Austin-Tracy Elementary School
- Eastern Elementary
- Hiseville Elementary School
- North Jackson Elementary
- Park City Elementary School
- Red Cross Elementary School
- Temple Hill Elementary School

=== Middle schools ===
- Barren County Middle Schools (Grades 7–8)

=== High schools ===
- Barren County High School (Grades 9–12)
- Trojan Academy (Grade 9)
