= Johnny Bell =

American politician

Majority Whip of the Kentucky House of Representatives
- In office January 6, 2015 – January 1, 2017
- Preceded by: Tommy Thompson
- Succeeded by: Kevin Bratcher

Member of the Kentucky House of Representatives from the 23rd district
- In office January 1, 2007 – January 1, 2017
- Preceded by: Steve Nunn
- Succeeded by: Steve Riley

Personal details
- Born: June 15, 1965 (age 61)
- Party: Democratic
- Education: Western Kentucky University; Salmon P. Chase College of Law
- Profession: Attorney

Johnny W. Bell (born June 15, 1965) is an American politician who served as a Democratic member of the Kentucky House of Representatives representing District 23 from 2007 to 2017. He also served as the Majority Whip of the Kentucky House of Representatives from 2015 to 2016. He did not seek reelection in 2016.

== Education ==
Bell earned his BS from Western Kentucky University and his JD from Northern Kentucky University.

== Elections ==
- 2012 Bell was unopposed for both the May 22, 2012 Democratic Primary and the November 6, 2012 General election, winning with 12,250 votes.
- 2006 To challenge District 23 incumbent Republican Representative Steve Nunn, Bell was unopposed for the 2006 Democratic Primary and won the November 7, 2006 General election with 6,652 votes (53.4%) against Representative Nunn.
- 2008 Bell was unopposed for both the 2008 Democratic Primary and the November 4, 2008 General election, winning with 12,418 votes.
- 2010 Bell was unopposed for the May 18, 2010 Democratic Primary and won the November 2, 2010 General election with 7,741 votes (56.7%) against Republican nominee Pam Browning.
