= Glasgow, Kentucky =

- City
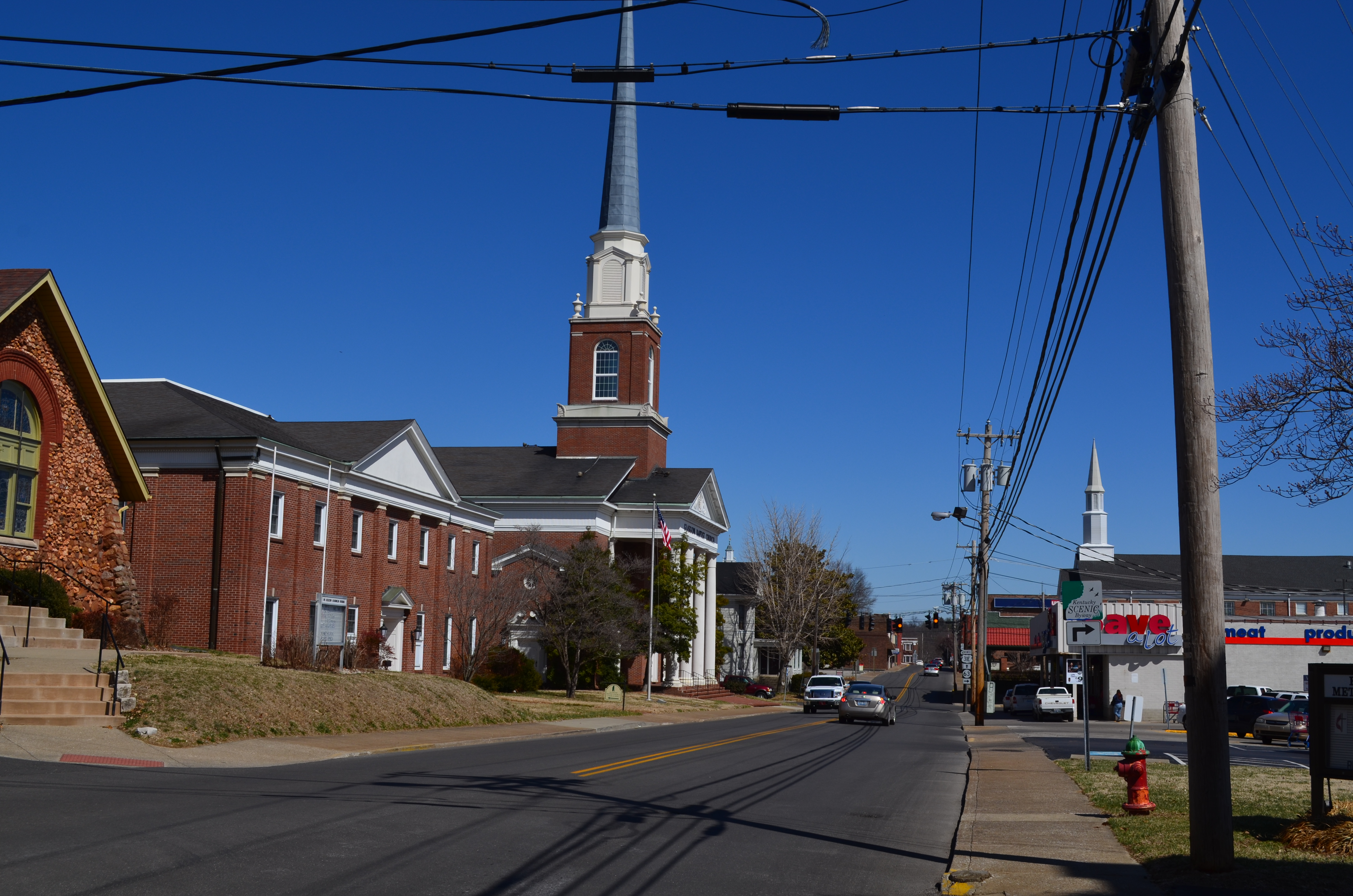
- South Green Street in Glasgow, KY

- Location of Glasgow in Barren County, Kentucky.
- Coordinates: 37°0′1″N 85°55′13″W
- Country: United States
- State: Kentucky
- County: Barren
- Established: 1799
- Named for: Glasgow

Government
  - Mayor: Henry Royse

Area
  - Total: 15.95 sq mi (41.30 km^{2})
  - Land: 15.86 sq mi (41.07 km^{2})
  - Water: 0.089 sq mi (0.23 km^{2})
- Elevation: 750 ft (230 m)

Population (2020)
  - Total: 15,014
  - Estimate (2022): 15,282
  - Density: 946.7/sq mi (365.54/km^{2})
- Time zone: UTC-6 (Central (CST))
  - Summer (DST): UTC-5 (CDT)
- ZIP codes: 42141, 42142, 42156
- Area codes: 270 & 364
- FIPS code: 21-31114
- GNIS feature ID: 0492876
- Website: cityofglasgow.gov

Glasgow is a home rule-class city in Barren County, Kentucky, United States. It is the seat of its county. Glasgow is the principal city of the Glasgow micropolitan area, which comprises Barren and Metcalfe counties. The population was 15,014 at the 2020 U.S. census.

The city is well known for its annual Scottish Highland Games. In 2007, Barren County was named the number one rural place to live by The Progressive Farmer magazine.

== Geography ==
Glasgow is located in central Barren County at 37°0′1″N 85°55′13″W (37.000375, -85.920229). U.S. Route 31E and U.S. Route 68 intersect north of the city, and the Louie B. Nunn Cumberland Parkway passes south of downtown, with access from four exits. Bowling Green is 32 miles (51 km) to the west, Mammoth Cave National Park is 21 miles (34 km) to the northwest, Elizabethtown is 55 miles (89 km) to the north, Columbia is 37 miles (60 km) to the east, and Scottsville is 24 miles (39 km) to the southwest.

According to the United States Census Bureau, Glasgow has a total area of 15.5 square miles (40.2 km^{2}), of which 15.4 square miles (40.0 km^{2}) is land and 0.077 square miles (0.2 km^{2}), or 0.53%, is water.

=== Climate ===
Climate data for Glasgow, Kentucky (1991–2020)
Month	Jan	Feb	Mar	Apr	May	Jun	Jul	Aug	Sep	Oct	Nov	Dec	Year
Mean daily maximum °F (°C)	47.2 (8.4)	52.4 (11.3)	61.6 (16.4)	72.8 (22.7)	80.7 (27.1)	87.3 (30.7)	90.3 (32.4)	89.9 (32.2)	83.8 (28.8)	73.5 (23.1)	60.4 (15.8)	50.5 (10.3)	70.9 (21.6)
Daily mean °F (°C)	38.1 (3.4)	41.8 (5.4)	50.3 (10.2)	59.7 (15.4)	68.5 (20.3)	75.6 (24.2)	79.1 (26.2)	77.9 (25.5)	71.3 (21.8)	60.7 (15.9)	49.5 (9.7)	41.4 (5.2)	59.5 (15.3)
Mean daily minimum °F (°C)	29.0 (−1.7)	31.3 (−0.4)	39.0 (3.9)	46.5 (8.1)	56.2 (13.4)	64.0 (17.8)	67.9 (19.9)	65.8 (18.8)	58.7 (14.8)	48.0 (8.9)	38.5 (3.6)	32.3 (0.2)	48.1 (8.9)
Average precipitation inches (mm)	4.14 (105)	4.40 (112)	5.15 (131)	5.27 (134)	5.77 (147)	4.88 (124)	4.97 (126)	3.44 (87)	3.79 (96)	3.74 (95)	3.92 (100)	5.41 (137)	54.88 (1,394)
Average snowfall inches (cm)	2.2 (5.6)	1.7 (4.3)	0.9 (2.3)	0.0 (0.0)	0.0 (0.0)	0.0 (0.0)	0.0 (0.0)	0.0 (0.0)	0.0 (0.0)	0.0 (0.0)	0.0 (0.0)	0.9 (2.3)	5.7 (14.5)
Source: NOAA

== History ==
The city of Glasgow was established by the Kentucky state assembly in 1799. The same year, the community was selected as the seat of a new county, owing to its central location, its large spring, native John Gorin's donation of 50 acres (20 ha) for public buildings, and its being named for the Scottish hometown of the father of William Logan, one of the two commissioners charged with selecting the county seat. A post office was established in 1803, and the town received its city rights in 1809.

George Washington in Glasgow

Former U.S. President George Washington had a half-brother named Augustine Washington Jr. who was the husband of Anne Aylett Washington and had a daughter named Elizabeth Washington. Elizabeth Washington married Alexander Eliot Spotswood and were given a home and land from George Washington (Elizabeth's uncle) in Glasgow. The home, called "Spotswood" after its first owner, Alexander Spotswood, is located at 309 N Race Street.

Historic homes

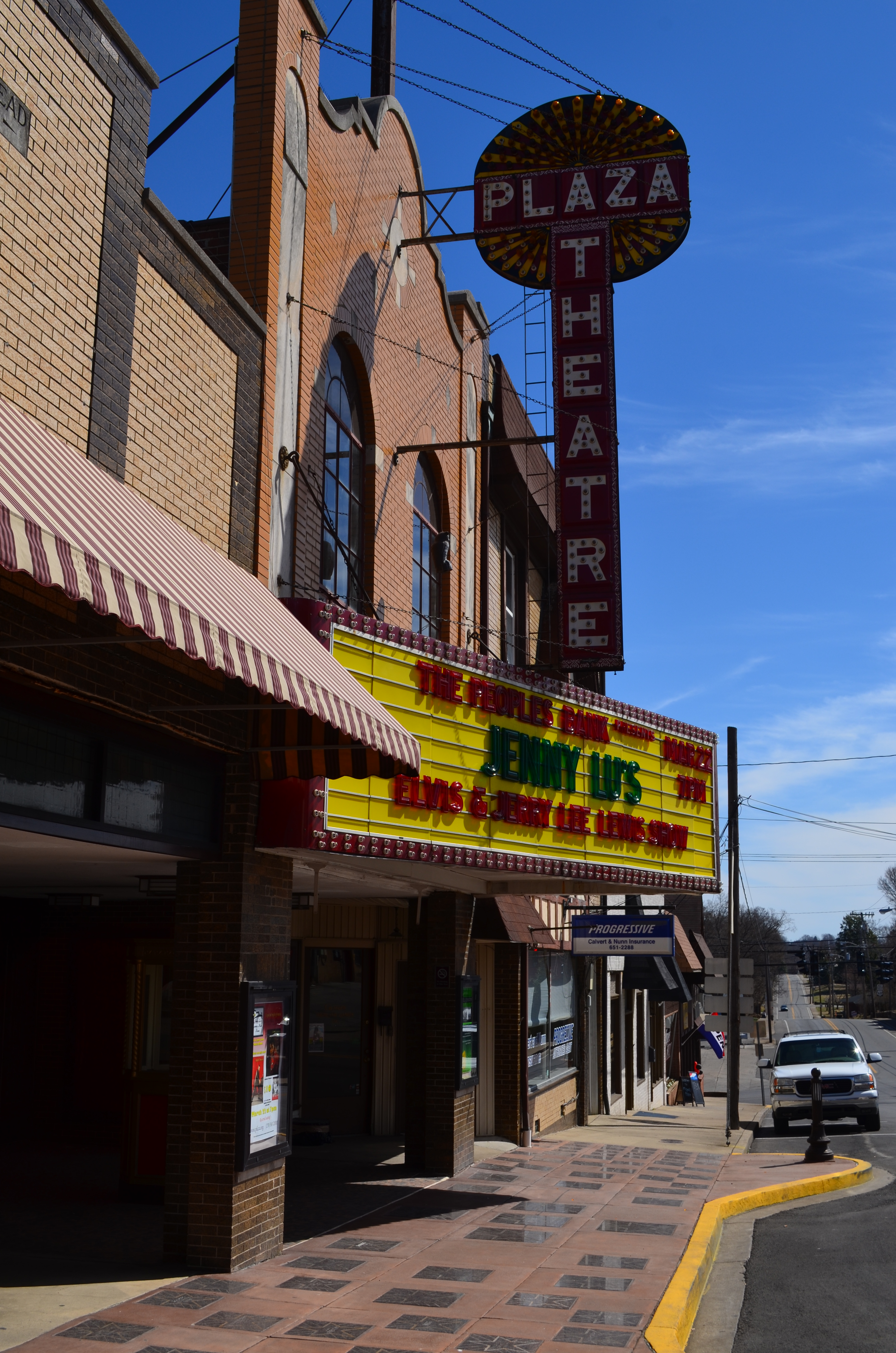
Historic Plaza Theatre in downtown Glasgow

All across Glasgow are historic homes that can date back to the early 1800s. The most popular part of town with these homes is South Green Street; this street has many historic houses that have many different architectural styles including Colonial, Federal, and Victorian.

Civil War

The Civil War affected many smaller towns like Glasgow. There are many places that were part of the Underground Railroad in Glasgow, such as Big Spring Bottom for keeping horses and the Spotswood House on North Race Street for hiding enslaved people. Other places include the Old Glasgow Seminary Home on East Main Street; this house has several rooms dug out in the earth with tunnels running into them for keeping the enslaved people hidden and safe. Early in the war a Confederate sympathizer living in area raised a Palmetto flag, but it was soon taken by a group of Unionist who dipped it in barrel of tar and set it on fire. In 1863, Union forces occupying Glasgow built Fort Williams, an earthen fortification. On Oct. 6, 1863, the fort was attacked and captured by Confederate forces who took the garrison prisoner and partially burned down the fort.

Western Kentucky University

Western Kentucky University was originally in Glasgow when it was established in 1875, but 10 years later it moved to its present-day location in Bowling Green and serves as WKU's main campus. Since 1998, WKU has operated a regional campus in Glasgow.

== Demographics ==
=== 2020 census ===
As of the 2020 census, Glasgow had a population of 15,014. The median age was 39.9 years. 23.2% of residents were under the age of 18 and 20.4% of residents were 65 years of age or older. For every 100 females there were 86.6 males, and for every 100 females age 18 and over there were 82.5 males age 18 and over.

94.6% of residents lived in urban areas, while 5.4% lived in rural areas.

There were 6,235 households in Glasgow, of which 29.8% had children under the age of 18 living in them. Of all households, 37.0% were married-couple households, 17.9% were households with a male householder and no spouse or partner present, and 37.2% were households with a female householder and no spouse or partner present. About 34.9% of all households were made up of individuals and 16.2% had someone living alone who was 65 years of age or older.

There were 7,051 housing units, of which 11.6% were vacant. The homeowner vacancy rate was 2.8% and the rental vacancy rate was 11.6%.

Racial composition as of the 2020 census
Race	Number	Percent
White	12,020	80.1%
Black or African American	1,185	7.9%
American Indian and Alaska Native	85	0.6%
Asian	169	1.1%
Native Hawaiian and Other Pacific Islander	38	0.3%
Some other race	439	2.9%
Two or more races	1,078	7.2%
Hispanic or Latino (of any race)	1,079	7.2%

=== 2010 census ===
As of the census of 2010, there were 14,208 people, 5,994 households, and 3,619 families residing in the city. The population density was 960.0 inhabitants per square mile (370.7/km^{2}). There were 6,710 housing units, at an average density of 453.38/sq mi (175.05/km^{2}). The racial makeup of the city was 86.1% White, 8.0% Black, 0.1% Native American, 0.8% Asian, 0.2% Pacific Islander, 2.1% from other races, and 2.7% from two or more races. Hispanics or Latinos of any race were 4.3% of the population.

There were 5,994 households, of which 26.4% had children under the age of 18 living with them, 40.5% were married couples living together, 15.8% had a female householder with no husband present, and 39.6% were non-families. 34.6% of all households were made up of individuals, and 16.0% had someone living alone who was 65 years of age or older. The average household size was 2.23, and the average family size was 2.85.

Historical population
Census	Pop.	Note	%±
1810	244		—
1830	617		—
1840	505		−18.2%
1850	933		84.8%
1870	733		—
1880	1,510		106.0%
1890	2,051		35.8%
1900	2,019		−1.6%
1910	2,316		14.7%
1920	2,559		10.5%
1930	5,042		97.0%
1940	5,815		15.3%
1950	7,025		20.8%
1960	10,068		43.3%
1970	11,301		12.2%
1980	12,958		14.7%
1990	12,351		−4.7%
2000	13,019		5.4%
2010	14,028		7.8%
2020	15,014		7.0%
2024 (est.)	15,388		2.5%
U.S. Decennial Census

The age distribution was 22.0% under the age of 18, 8.5% from 18 to 24, 25.9% from 25 to 44, 23.0% from 45 to 64, and 20.5% who were 65 years of age or older. The median age was 40 years. For every 100 females, there were 82.5 males. For every 100 females age 18 and over, there were 78.4 males.

The median income for a household in the city was $28,083, and the median income for a family was $36,677. Males had a median income of $31,123 versus $20,964 for females. The per capita income for the city was $18,697. About 14.1% of families and 19.5% of the population were below the poverty line, including 26.2% of those under age 18 and 20.9% of those age 65 or over.

== Politics ==
Glasgow is governed by a mayor and city council.

Mayors of Glasgow:

- Henry Royse - January 2023 – present
- Harold Armstrong - January 2019 – December 2022
- Dick Doty - January 2015 - December 2018
- Rhonda Riherd Trautman - January 2011 - December 2014
- Darrell G. Pickett - January 2003 - December 2010
- Charles B. Honeycutt - January 1986 - December 2002
- Luska Twyman - September 1968 - December 1985
- Robert A. Lessenberry - January 1966 - September 1968
- Lynn Mayfield - January 1962 - December 1965
- William H. Grissom - January 1958 - December 1961
- W. Earl Walbert - January 1954 - December 1957
- Leslie Moran - January 1950 - December 1953
- Sewell C. Harlin - January 1946 - December 1949
- Winn Davis - January 1936 - December 1945
- J. E. Clayton - January 1926 - December 1935
- Brice T. Leech - January 1922 - December 1925

In the mid-1990s, Glasgow began its own cable system for television and internet access. The municipal service had saved its residents $32 million over proprietary providers through 2011.

In November 2008, the city voted Yes on Proposition 8, making it legal for restaurants to sell liquor by the drink to the public; package sales were still prohibited. Another vote in 2016 legalized liquor sales throughout all of Barren County, and also legalized package sales and liquor by the drink in taverns.

In April 2010, the city council voted for a citywide smoking ban in all indoor public places. The ban began officially on June 22, 2010.

== Education ==
Glasgow public schools are part of the Glasgow Independent Schools. The district has two elementary schools, one middle school, and one high school. Chad Muhlenkamp is the Superintendent of Schools. The city system's schools include South Green Elementary School, Highland Elementary School, Glasgow Middle School, and Glasgow High School.

The Barren County Schools System also has schools inside the Glasgow city limits, including Barren County High School, Trojan Academy, Red Cross Elementary School, North Jackson Elementary, Eastern Elementary,and Barren County Middle School.

Glasgow has a public library, the Mary Wood Weldon Memorial Library.

== Climate ==
The climate in this area is characterized by hot, humid summers and generally mild to cool winters. According to the Köppen Climate Classification system, Glasgow has a humid subtropical climate, abbreviated "Cfa" on climate maps.

== Economy ==
Major employers in Glasgow include LSC Communications (formerly R. R. Donnelley, now closed), Akebono Brake Industry, Walmart, Nemak, and ACK Controls (a joint venture of Chuo Spring and Dura Automotive Systems). Other employers include South Central Rural Telephone Cooperative and Glasgow Independent Schools.

In February 2026, Kingspan Group PLC, parent company of Tate, a data center infrastructure company announced a $76 million investment, first presented in October 2025, to open its largest North American manufacturing plant in Glasgow. The project is expected to create 400 new full-time manufacturing jobs once the 764,000-square-foot facility is fully operational.

== Transportation ==
Glasgow Transit provides bus service in the city on weekdays.

== Notable people ==
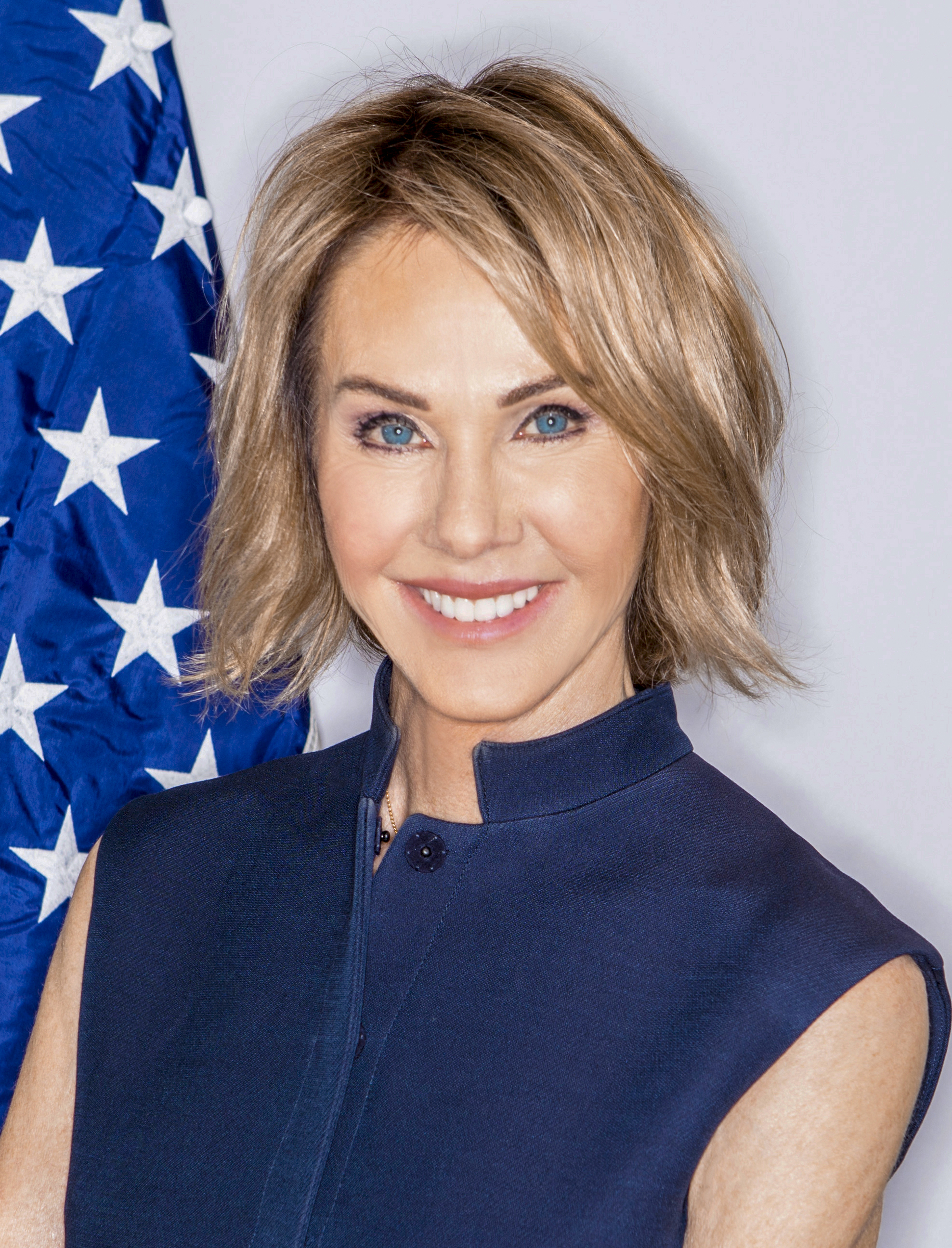
Kelly Craft

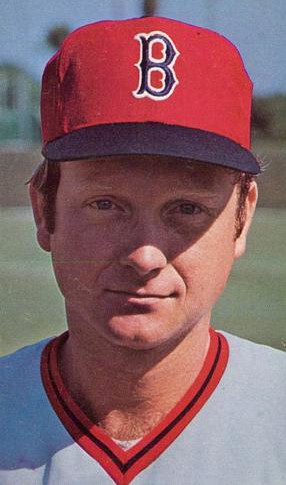
Denny Doyle

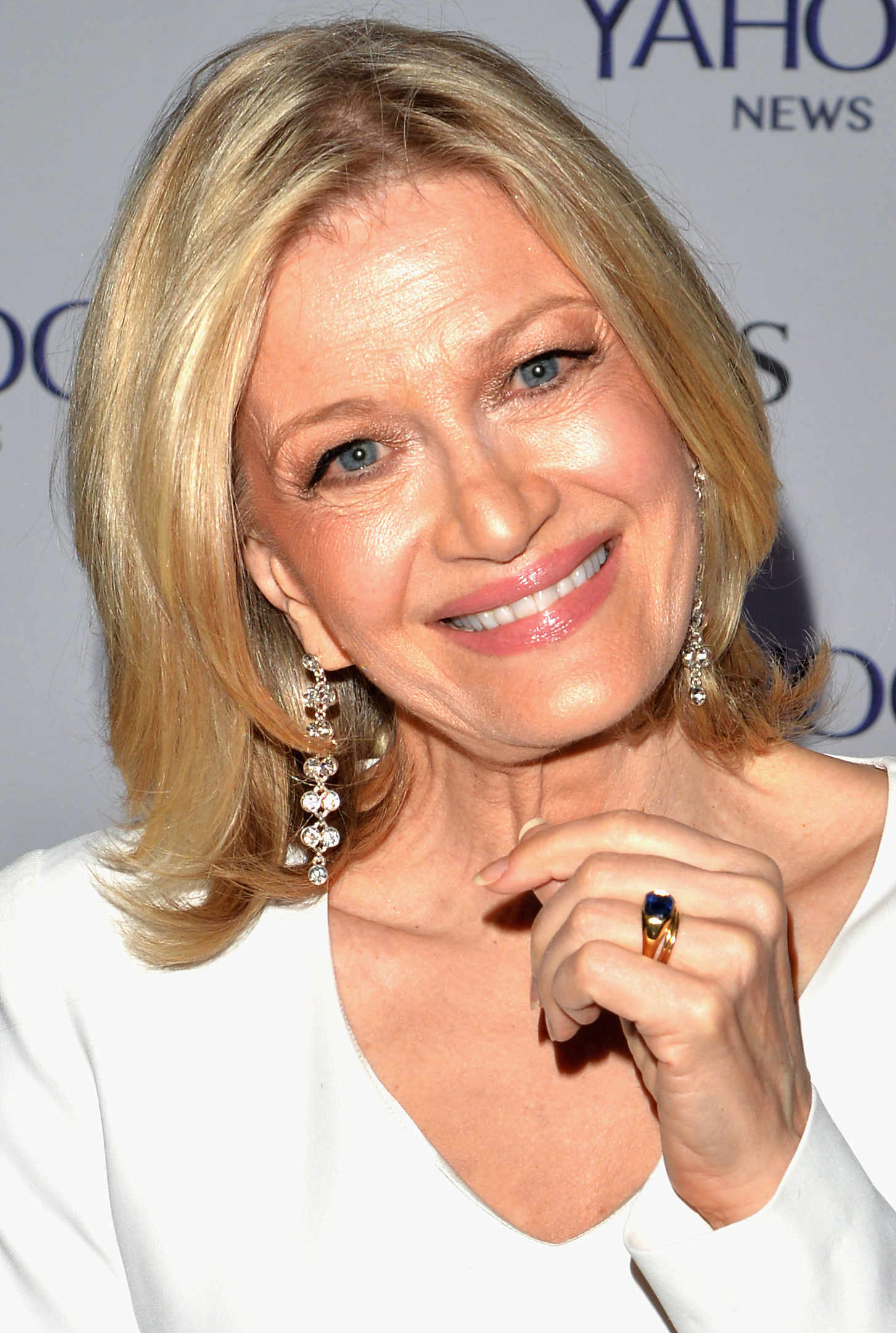
Diane Sawyer

- Walter Arnold Baker (1937–2010) : Associate Justice, Kentucky Supreme Court, Assistant General Counsel for International Affairs in the Department of Defense, Member of Kentucky Senate and House of Representatives, Lieutenant Colonel, Kentucky Air National Guard
- Johnny Bell (born 1965), former Majority Whip in House of Representatives of Kentucky
- Jesse Bishop (1933–1979), convicted murderer executed in Nevada by gas chamber
- Willa Brown (1906–1992), first black woman to run for Congress (1946), and first black woman to receive a commercial pilot's license in the United States
- Richard E. Bush (1924–2004), Master Gunnery Sergeant, Medal of Honor recipient for service during World War II
- Kelly Craft (née Guilfoil; born 1962), Former United States Ambassador to the United Nations and United States Ambassador to Canada
- Nettie Depp (1874–1932), founder of first public four-year high school in Barren County (at Glasgow's former Liberty College), and first woman public official elected in Barren County (public school superintendent 1913–17)
- Russell E. Dougherty (1920–2007), 4-star General and former commander of the US Air Force Strategic Air Command
- Denny Doyle (born 1944), former Major League Baseball player
- Julian Goodman (1922–2012), former president of NBC
- Jim Gray (born 1953), Mayor of Lexington
- James G. Hardy (1795–1856), former lieutenant governor of Kentucky
- Dave Harris (born 1971), host of syndicated radio show Retro Rewind and songwriter
- Salty Holmes (1910–1970), singer and actor
- Darrin Horn (born 1972), former Western Kentucky University men's basketball coach, former University of South Carolina coach
- Courtney Johnson (1939–1996), banjo player, member of New Grass Revival
- Several members of The Kentucky Headhunters, award-winning country rock band
- Sydney Kirkpatrick (1881–1930), singer and actor; born in Glasgow
- Arthur Krock (1886–1974), journalist
- Preston Leslie (1819–1907), former governor of Kentucky
- Louie Nunn (1924–2004), former governor of Kentucky
- Steve Nunn (born 1952), former state representative; son of Louie Nunn; pleaded guilty to murdering his former fiancée
- Diane Sawyer (born 1945), journalist and host of ABC World News
- John T. Scott (1831–1891), Justice of the Indiana Supreme Court
- Luska Twyman (1913–1988), mayor of Glasgow and first black mayor in Kentucky
- Billy Vaughn (1919–1991), musician and band leader
- Bryant Vincent (Born 1975), former UAB Football Coach, current University of Louisiana at Monroe head coach

== See also ==
- Park City, Kentucky, formerly known as Glasgow Junction
