= Frankfort High School (Kentucky) =

Coordinates: 38.19279°N 84.87689°W

Location
- 328 Shelby St; Frankfort, Kentucky; United States

Information
- Type: Public secondary
- Established: 1889
- School district: Frankfort Independent Schools
- Teaching staff: 24.00 (FTE)
- Grades: 9–12
- Enrollment: 313 (2023-2024)
- Student to teacher ratio: 13.04
- Colors: Orange and blue
- Mascot: Panthers
- Newspaper: www.frankfort.k12.ky.us/page/frankfort-high-school

Frankfort High School is located at 328 Shelby Street in Frankfort, Kentucky, United States. It is part of the Frankfort Independent School District which consists of Second Street School, Panther Transition Academy, and Frankfort High School.

In December 1885, the original building burned. Students had classes in various buildings in downtown until the school could be rebuilt. The new building was built large enough to allow for a full high school. After the fire, Frankfort High School reopened in 1889. The school had a 3-year program and the 1st graduating of 7 girls was in 1892. In 1892, Frankfort City Schools became the first school in Kentucky to offer kindergarten. A commercial school program was added in 1904. A 4-year program was started in 1909. In 1956, Frankfort High School became desegregated. Notable graduates include George C. Wolfe, Steve Nunn, Major General Edgar E. Hume, Lt. Governor Crit Luallen, diplomat James Sutterlin, and silent film star Bob Custer (Raymond Glenn). The Frankfort High mascot is a panther.

The U.S. News & World Report named Frankfort High School the 12th best High School in Kentucky in 2014. In 2024, it was ranked the 109th best high school in Kentucky according to U.S. News.
