= Rachel Roberts (politician) =

American politician

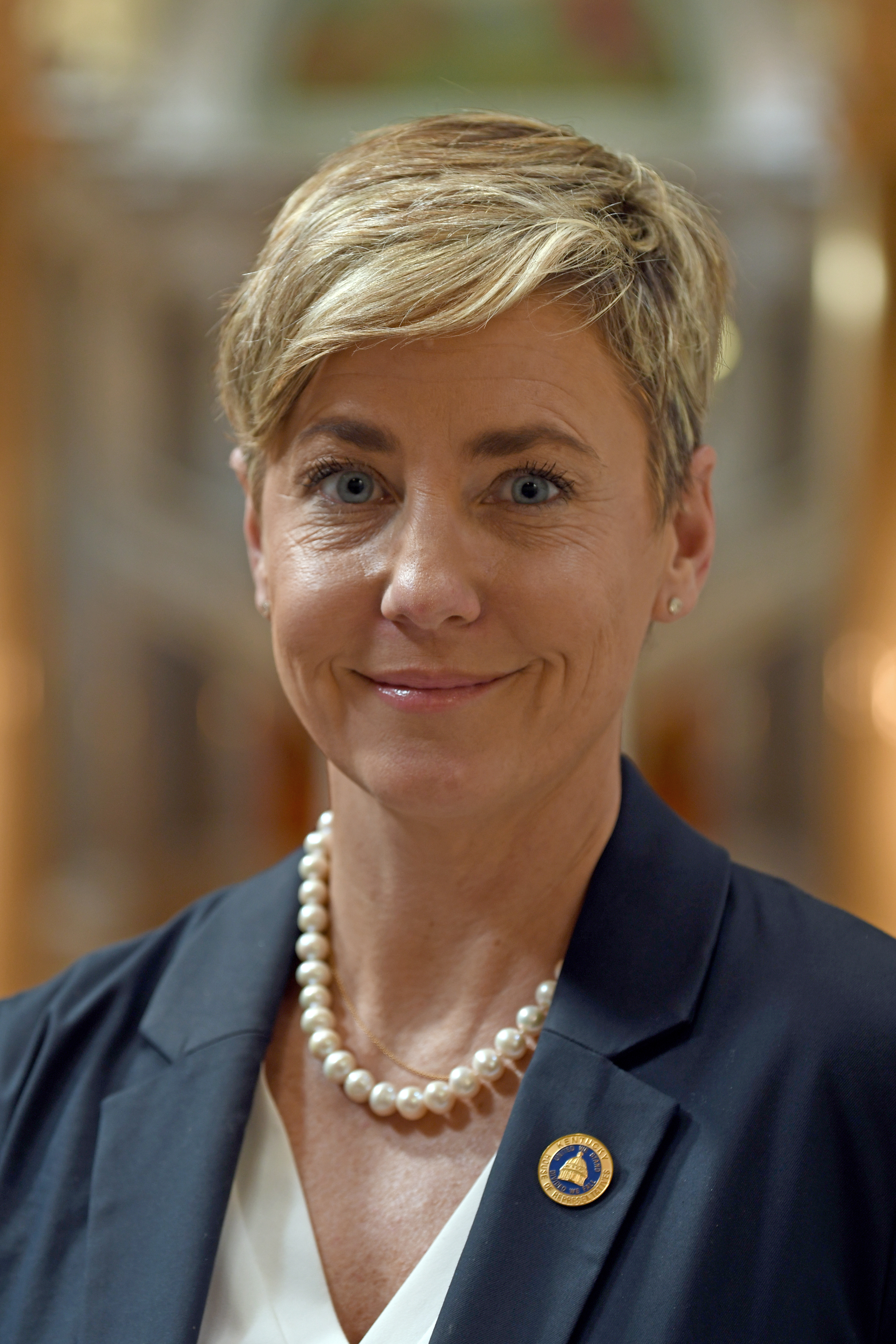

Member of the Kentucky House of Representatives from the 67th district
- In office March 3, 2020 – January 1, 2025
- Preceded by: Dennis Keene
- Succeeded by: Matthew Lehman

Personal details
- Born: Rachel Catherine Roberts; July 16, 1973 (age 53) Cincinnati, Ohio, U.S.
- Party: Democratic
- Education: Fort Lewis College (BA)

Rachel Catherine Roberts (born July 16, 1973) is an American politician and businesswoman who served as a member of the Kentucky House of Representatives, the first woman ever to hold the 67th district seat. Roberts assumed office on March 3, 2020. In 2023, she became house minority whip, the fifth woman elected to house leadership in Kentucky history. She did not seek reelection in 2024.

== Early life and education ==
Roberts is a native of Cincinnati and moved to Colorado after graduating from high school. She earned a Bachelor of Arts degree in marketing and business from Fort Lewis College and completed programs at the Harvard Kennedy School and Yale University.

== Career ==
From 2004 to 2005, Roberts worked as a writer and photographer for a travel blog. From 2005 to 2007, she worked in marketing for the Aspen Skiing Company. Roberts then worked as a director at Timbers Resorts. In 2010, she founded the Yoga Bar. She also founded Bija Yoga School and operates a strategy firm. Roberts was elected to the Kentucky House of Representatives in a March 2020 special election.
