= Barren County High School =

Location
- 507 Trojan Trail; Glasgow, Kentucky 42141; United States
- Coordinates: 36°58′29″N 85°55′09″W

Information
- Type: Public high school
- School district: Barren County Schools
- Principal: Amy Irwin
- Teaching staff: 80.84 (FTE)
- Grades: 9–12
- Enrollment: 1,301 (2023–2024)
- Student to teacher ratio: 16.09
- Colors: Burgundy and gold
- Nickname: Trojans
- Website: bchs.barren.kyschools.us/o/bchs

Barren County High School is a four-year public high school located in Glasgow, Kentucky, U.S. It is one of two high schools serving the Barren County school system, the other being the Trojan Academy.

It is located on the south side of Glasgow on Trojan Trail off of U.S. Route 31E near the exit 11 interchange off the Louie B. Nunn Cumberland Parkway.

The school's principal is Amy Irwin.

== Athletics ==
The Barren County High School athletic teams are known as the Trojans. The school colors are burgundy and gold, a similar color scheme to that of the University of Southern California, whose collegiate teams are also called the Trojans.
