= National Register of Historic Places listings in Cumberland County, Kentucky =

Location of Cumberland County in Kentucky

This is a list of the National Register of Historic Places listings in Cumberland County, Kentucky.

It is intended to be a complete list of the properties on the National Register of Historic Places in Cumberland County, Kentucky, United States. The locations of National Register properties for which the latitude and longitude coordinates are included below, may be seen in a map.

There are 3 properties listed on the National Register in the county.

This National Park Service list is complete through NPS recent listings posted March 21, 2025.

== Current listings ==
	Name on the Register	Image	Date listed	Location	City or town	Description
1	James Baker House	James Baker House	April 5, 2006 (#06000212)	Kentucky Route 61; 36°51′33″N 85°22′36″W	Burkesville	
2	Coe House	Coe House	December 23, 2009 (#09001138)	433 N. Main St. 36°47′48″N 85°21′59″W	Burkesville	
3	Marrowbone Historic District	Marrowbone Historic District	July 28, 1983 (#83004048)	Kentucky Route 90; 36°49′42″N 85°30′11″W	Marrowbone	

== See also ==
- List of National Historic Landmarks in Kentucky
- National Register of Historic Places listings in Kentucky
