= Bakerton =

Bakerton may refer to:

- Bakerton, Kentucky, an unincorporated community in Cumberland County
- Bakerton, Tennessee, an unincorporated community in Clay County
- Bakerton, West Virginia, an unincorporated community in Jefferson County

== See also ==
- The Bakerton Group
