= Pearl Carter Pace =

American politician (1896–1970)

Sheriff of Cumberland County, Kentucky
- In office 1938–1941
- Preceded by: Stanley Dan Pace

Personal details
- Born: January 25, 1896 Tompkinsville, Kentucky, U.S.
- Died: January 1970 (aged c. 74) Burkesville, Kentucky, U.S.
- Resting place: Grider Memorial Cemetery in Waterview, Kentucky
- Party: Republican
- Spouse: Stanley Dan Pace
- Children: Including: Stanley Carter Pace Patty-Nell Pace Keen
- Occupation: Educator, Businesswoman, Politician

Pearl Carter Pace (January 25, 1896 – January 1970) was one of the earliest elected female sheriffs in the Commonwealth of Kentucky, 1938–1941. (Note: Mary Lois Roach was sworn in as Sheriff of Graves County, Kentucky in 1922 becoming the first acting female sheriff in the state of Kentucky. She then won election in August 1923. See also List of first female sheriffs in the United States)

== Early years ==
Pearl Carter was born into a family devoted to public service in Tompkinsville in Monroe County, Kentucky. Her father, James C. Carter Sr., had served for forty years as a circuit judge in south central Kentucky. James C. Carter Jr., the brother of Pearl Carter Pace and U.S. Representative, Dr. Tim Lee Carter, also served in political office for many years.

Pearl Carter married Stanley Dan Pace, the owner of a profitable roadbuilding company and relocated to his neighboring Cumberland County.

== Political career ==
Originally a schoolteacher and a businesswoman, Pace had a great philosophy of life: "Anybody can do anything he wants if he just wants enough to make the effort." This thinking took her into areas of life largely uncharted for rural southern women. She was the sheriff of Cumberland County from 1937 to 1941. During her four-year term as sheriff, she came to be known as "Pistol-Packin' Pearl."

Pace's husband, Stanley Dan Pace, had been "drafted" in 1933 to run for Cumberland County sheriff by county citizens determined to control rum-running and organized crime during prohibition. He was elected as the first Democrat to hold that office since the 19th century. When his term ended, he was unable to succeed himself; so Pearl was drafted to run and was elected. Stanley Pace died in a car accident, leaving Pearl Carter Pace to raise their children and to pursue her career in local, state, and national politics.

During World War II, her son, Stanley Carter Pace, a fighter pilot and first lieutenant, was taken as a prisoner of war by the German Reich. Upon returning from the war, Stanley C. Pace put his aerospace engineering degree to work and rose to the chairmanship of TRW. After being pulled from retirement in the 1980s, he assumed the position of restoring the giant defense contractor, General Dynamics, to credibility after grievous ethical lapses brought the company to near dissolution.

Through Pearl Carter Pace's activism in the Republican Party, she became a tireless supporter and friend of U.S. President Dwight D. Eisenhower. In 1953, she brought national attention to Kentucky when President Eisenhower appointed her to the War Claims Commission (later the Foreign Claims Settlement Commission). Near the end of his administration, Eisenhower elevated her to the commission chairmanship, making Pearl Carter Pace the third highest ranking woman in his administration, next only to the Treasurer of the United States and the new position of United States Secretary of Health, Education, and Welfare, and the first Kentucky woman appointed by a president to a national post. Pace was active in the GOP for many years, including a stint from 1948 to 1957 as her state's Republican national committeewoman.

== Death ==
Pace died in 1970 at the home of her daughter, Patty-Nell Pace Keen, in Burkesville, the seat of Cumberland County. Pace is interred beside her husband at the former Pace-Allen Cemetery, now Grider Memorial Cemetery, in Waterview in Cumberland County at a site overlooking Pace Farms.
