= Grider, Kentucky =

Unincorporated community in Kentucky, United States

Grider
- Unincorporated community
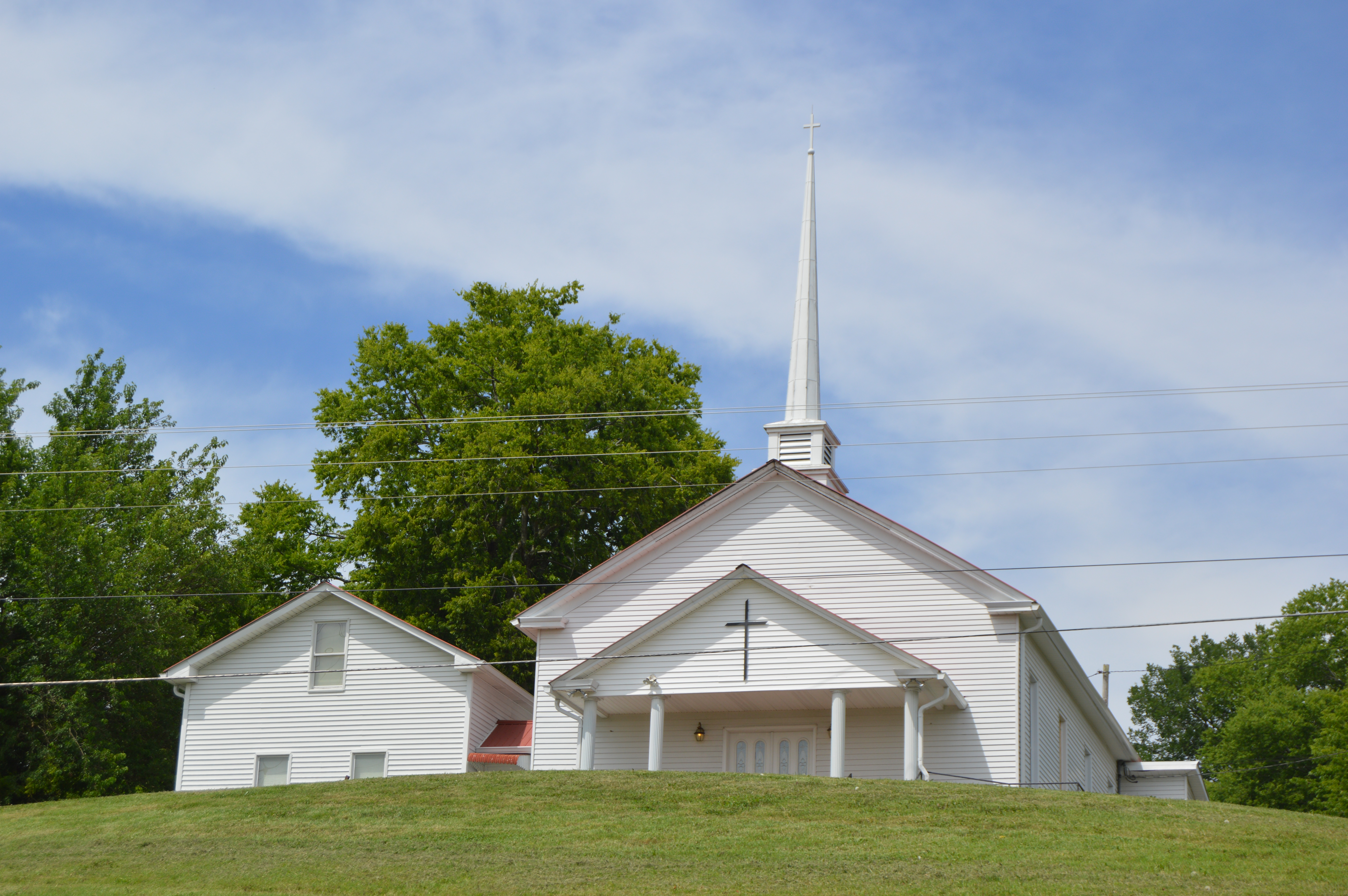
- Methodist church

- Location within the state of Kentucky Grider (the United States)
- Coordinates: 36°48′15″N 85°25′32″W
- Country: United States
- State: Kentucky
- County: Cumberland
- Elevation: 617 ft (188 m)
- Time zone: UTC-6 (Central (CST))
  - Summer (DST): UTC-5 (CDT)
- GNIS feature ID: 493373

Grider is an unincorporated community in Cumberland County, Kentucky, United States. It lies along Kentucky Route 90, west of the city of Burkesville, the county seat of Cumberland County. Its elevation is 617 feet (188 m).
