= Dubre, Kentucky =

Unincorporated community in Kentucky, United States

Dubre
- Unincorporated community
- Location within the state of Kentucky Dubre (the United States)
- Coordinates: 36°50′20″N 85°33′31″W
- Country: United States
- State: Kentucky
- County: Cumberland
- Elevation: 640 ft (200 m)
- Time zone: UTC-6 (Central (CST))
  - Summer (DST): UTC-5 (CDT)
- ZIP codes: 42717, 42731
- GNIS feature ID: 507879

Dubre is an unincorporated community in Cumberland County, Kentucky, United States.

== Geography ==
The community is located along Route 90 west-northwest of the city of Burkesville, the county seat of Cumberland County, near the Metcalfe County line. Its elevation is 640 feet (195 m).

== History ==
Dubre had a post office, with the ZIP code of 42731. The postmaster of Dubre, Ms. Hazel Anderson Alexander, died November 18, 2010. The post office, which had been open only two hours a day was suspended by the USPS several weeks after her death, on December 3, 2010. Ms. Alexander began her tenure with the Dubre post office March 31, 1970. The Post Office was located inside of the Anderson Grocery, which also closed after Alexander's death.

The community was named for the local Dubre family. In this local town, violent crime affects approximately 0.25% of the population.
