= Coe Ridge Colony =

Isolated multi-racial community in Kentucky

Coordinates: 36.678°N 85.468°W

Map of Kentucky (Cumberland County in red)

The Coe Ridge Colony was founded by Ezekiel (who went by Zeke on occasion) and Patsy Ann Coe in 1866. After the January 1863 Emancipation Proclamation, which ended slavery in secessionist Confederate states, and the December 1865 ratification of the 13th Amendment, many ex-slaves struggled to find ways to support themselves and their families. Some resorted to share-cropping with their previous masters, others migrated and tried to find their own settlements, and yet others purchased land from the plantation they had previously worked as slaves. The Coe Ridge Colony was a refuge for African Americans, Native Americans, and disenfranchised white women against the persecutions of society. The colony was in particular a place of refuge for freed slaves, who needed a place to escape their oppressors and attempt to build a life for themselves. Coe Ridge Colony was widely renowned in neighboring areas as a mixing pot of "misfits" and "outcasts". However, this reputation didn't prevent the residents of Coe Ridge Colony from building a thriving community. Coe Ridge Colony was isolated in the Southern Mountains of Kentucky with the Cumberland River as the main mode of transportation for nearly a century. Coe Ridge Colony was isolated not only physically, but socially and culturally as well. Coe Ridge Colony had its own distinct culture, due to its unique racial diversity found nearly nowhere else during this time. By the 1930s however, the physical and cultural isolation would be nearly non-existent as neighboring communities increased their interaction with the colony. Because of Coe Ridge Colony's isolation and self-managed society, there are no newspapers or court records to assist with outlining the daily lives of the residents. Additionally, the residents were nearly all illiterate, making diaries/journals a non-existent source of information. The history of Coe Ridge Colony was preserved primarily by the spoken word, with aid coming from the neighboring communities who interacted with Coe Ridge Colony.

== History ==
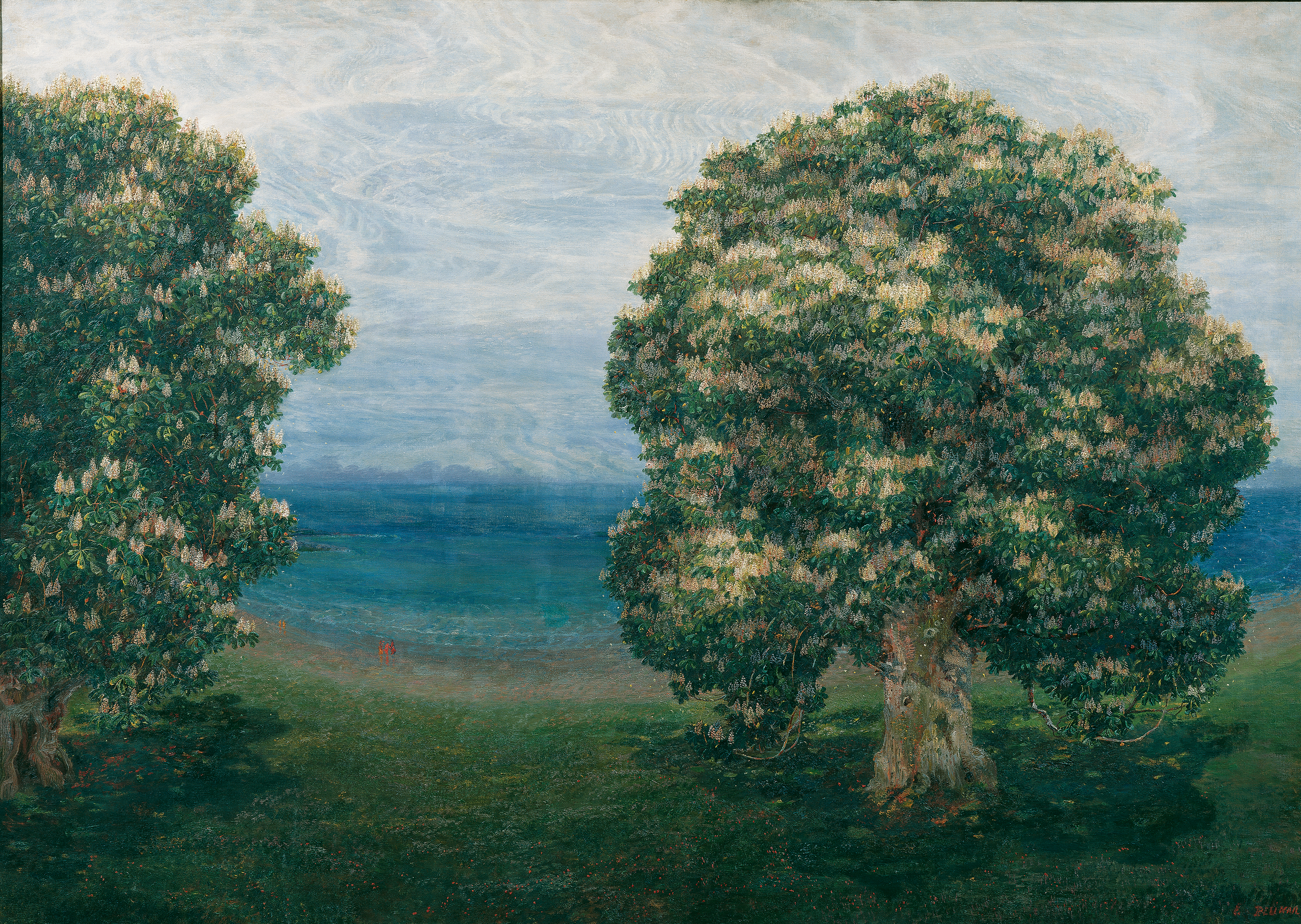
Drawing of Chestnut Trees

The little ridge in Cumberland County that would later become Coe Ridge Colony was first inhabited by a man named Ezekiel (who was Jesse Coe's favorite slave in 1866). Ezekiel was 50% white, 25% African American, and 25% Native American. While Ezekiel was living in Coe Ridge, he met and eventually married Patsy. Patsy was a slave for Ezekiel's prior masters, a wealthy white family who went by the name of Coe. Ezekiel and Patsy had 10 children, who they would reclaim after the slaves were freed by the 1865 Thirteenth Amendment which ended slavery. Their former master, who went by the name of Jesse Coe, offered to sell a portion of the Coe plantation that would later become the Coe Ridge Colony. Jesse Coe sold the 300 acres of land to Ezekiel and Patsy for six hundred dollars. When the land was first purchased from Jesse Coe, there were only sixteen residents of the Coe Ridge Colony. They were faced with the enormous task of turning the 300 acres of untamed and overgrown wilderness into a place where they could establish a community. The successful side of having these 300 acres of forest was that it provided the staple product of the Coe Ridge Colony's economy, as well as providing for the construction of homes in the community. The extensive chestnut orchards also provided food, as well as additional income for the colony. The chestnut orchards of Coe Ridge became a source of conflict between the minority groups found in Coe Ridge, and their white neighbors who resented the presence of Coe Ridge Colony. Each side took issue as to who owned the chestnut orchards, and therefore who had rights to the income they produced. However, a chestnut blight in the early 1900s would dry up this source of food and income. With the collapse of their main source of income, namely lumber and chestnut harvesting, members of the community turned to moonshining and bootlegging to try and sustain their families and lives. However, by 1958 the colony of Coe Ridge had become desolate, the once busy colony completely abandoned.

=== Middle Years of the Colony: 1885–1910 ===
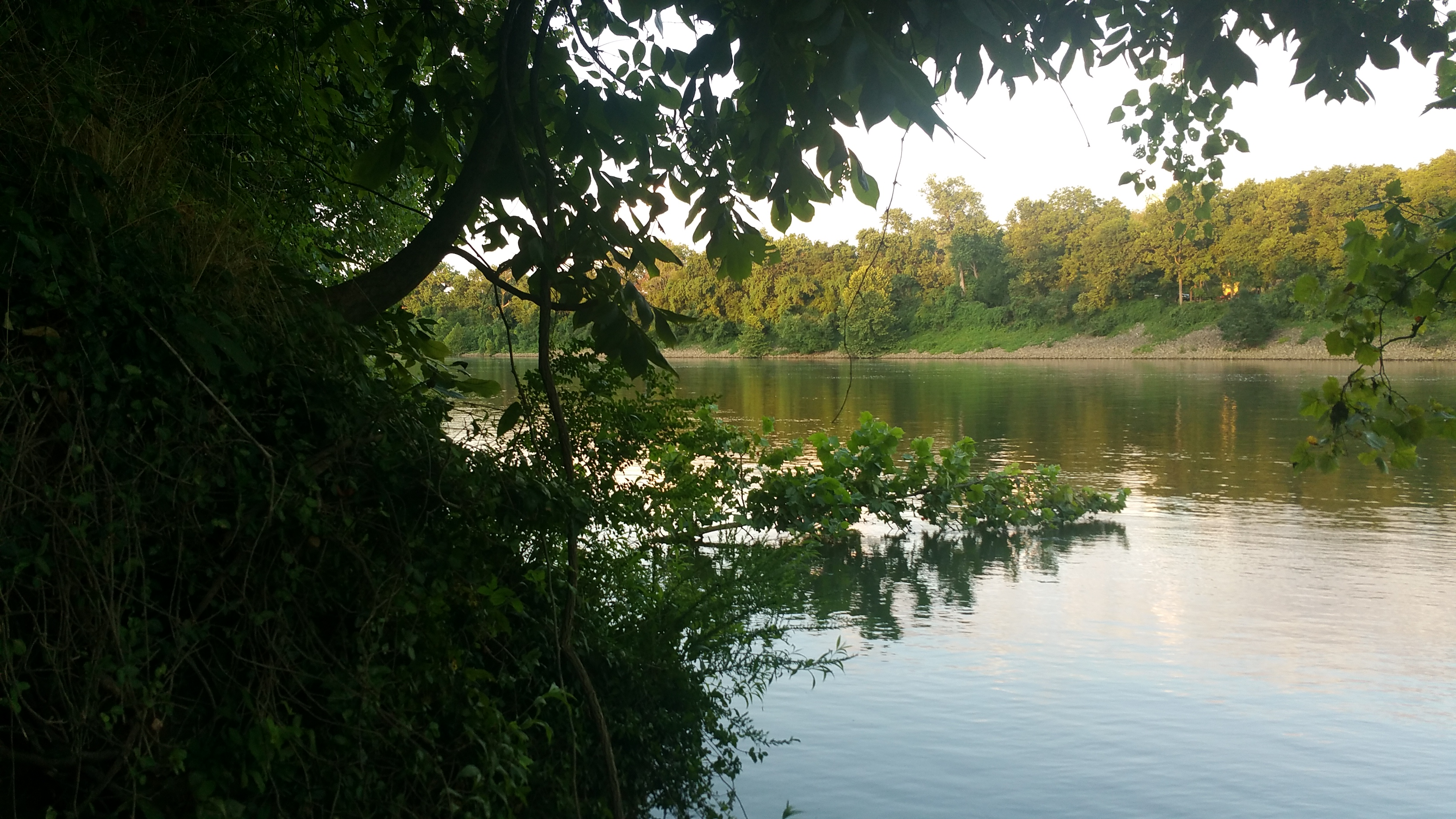
Cumberland River

Racial tensions were constantly a problem for Coe Ridge Colony, but were especially prominent during the middle years of the Coe Ridge Colony. Members of the Coe Ridge Colony placed all the blame on the neighboring white communities for the racial feuds that existed. In most instances, their placing of the blame on the white communities was warranted. The young white men of Coe Ridge Colony's neighboring communities would often get drunk, and then would ride their horses through the Coe Ridge Colony, tearing down fences, damaging property, and generally causing a ruckus. Likewise, the neighboring white communities of the Coe Ridge Colony felt that the blame for the racial tension rested on the residents of the Coe Ridge Colony. Due to this, many of the residents of the neighboring white communities tried to do everything in their power to run the outcast group of minorities off of Coe Ridge. Tensions finally erupted into a violent racial feud in 1888. After a group of white men were caught torturing a group of African American children, the members of the Coe Ridge Colony had finally had enough. A massive fight broke out between the members of Coe Ridge Colony and their white neighbors. Members of both sides were killed in the fight, and it eventually calmed down as each side returned to their homes to lick their wounds. After the death of a prominent white man Will Taylor was discovered, all the other white men pledged to go and murder every single man in the Coe Ridge Colony. The residents of the Coe Ridge Colony learned of this pledge and defended themselves by leaving their homes in the middle of the night, which the white folk were ready to set on fire with everyone inside. Upon returning to the Coe Ridge Colony, residents were assigned shifts to protect the borders of the colony against further attacks. Tensions eventually calmed down, though the arrival of more divorced/disenfranchised white women to the Coe Ridge Colony would temporarily flare tensions once again. As the Chestnut trees were lost to the blight, and the Coe Ridge Colony turned to moonshining and bootlegging, the colony became a riotous place to live. Alcoholism, murder, and violence became commonplace even amongst the members of the Coe Ridge Colony themselves.

=== The Decline of Coe Ridge Colony: 1911–1958 ===
By 1904, residents of Coe Ridge Colony had established their reputation as moonshiners and by the 1920-30s rumors spread that the Coe Ridge residents were fighting amongst themselves and killing members of their own races. Moonshining and bootlegging were major factors in the extinction of the colony. Judge Wells was the first county law official to confront the Coe Ridge Colony residents about their riotous living, and stated that whiskey was the root of their problem. Moonshining was such an integral part of the culture of Coe Ridge Colony that even the women and children were part of the moonshining business. Children were taught to make whiskey at an early age. The Cumberland County Sheriff Department led frequent raids against the Coe Ridge Colony moonshiners, to the great displeasure of those involved in the moonshining business. The Coe Ridge Colony residents developed a warning system as a means of notifying each other when Law Enforcement officers were nearby, using the catch-phrase “Pig oooey, Pig oooey”. However, despite their best efforts, the moonshiners in Coe Ridge Colony steadily were eradicated. Without any real means of income, residents turned to burglary. However, thieves were often caught, and when caught were punished with exile from the colony, and a warning to never return. A lack of economical resources, a propensity for crime, and a tendency of neighboring communities towards blatant persecution drove out all of the residents of Coe Ridge Colony. Only three houses remain on the 300 acres of Coe Ridge, slowly being reclaimed by the wilderness surrounding it, and forgotten in the annals of history.

== Importance of Coe Ridge Colony ==
The history of Coe Ridge Colony is an example of a multi-racial community in a time where racial tensions were high, and co-existence seemed nearly impossible. Lynching, the Ku Klux Klan, and other forms of racial persecution raged across the entire United States of America, and more specifically across Kentucky. The unique mix of previously enslaved African Americans, Native Americans, and disenfranchised white women was a very rare occurrence during this time period. In a time when separate but equal segregation was legalized, Coe Ridge Colony showed that different races could live together in harmony.

While this harmony didn't last (due to economic collapse, lack of local justice system, and external persecution), Coe Ridge colony proved that interracial harmony wasn't an impossible feat. Additionally, while the persecution of the residents of Coe Ridge Colony was despicable, it added another case to the ever increasing list of oppression against minorities in the United States. These instances would prove essential in the battle for racial equality and protecting minority groups from blatant persecution.

The colony of Coe Ridge served as inspiration for the third season of FX Network's Justified. The season features an isolated black community deep in Harlan County, Kentucky known as Noble's Holler, whose leader risks all to keep his community out of sight from criminals and the law alike. On multiple occasions during the show's run, Noble's Holler serves as a refuge for white women that have nowhere else to run.
