= Judio, Kentucky =

Unincorporated community in Kentucky, United States

Judio
- Unincorporated community
- Location within the state of Kentucky Judio (the United States)
- Coordinates: 36°41′45″N 85°28′51″W
- Country: United States
- State: Kentucky
- County: Cumberland
- Elevation: 545 ft (166 m)
- Time zone: UTC-6 (Central (CST))
  - Summer (DST): UTC-5 (CDT)
- GNIS feature ID: 508361

Judio is an unincorporated community in Cumberland County, Kentucky, United States.

== Geography ==
The community is located along Route 953 southwest of the city of Burkesville, the county seat of Cumberland County. It is also located near the boundary with Monroe County, and it is one of several small communities in Cumberland County that is located along its namesake river. The elevation of Judio is 545 feet (166 m).
