= 1972 United States presidential election in Kentucky =

- November 7, 1972

Nominee	Richard Nixon	George McGovern
Party	Republican	Democratic
Home state	California	South Dakota
Running mate	Spiro Agnew	Sargent Shriver
Electoral vote	9	0
Popular vote	676,446	371,159
Percentage	63.37%	34.77%
County results
Nixon
40–50%
50–60%
60–70%
70–80%
80–90%
90–100%
McGovern
40–50%
50–60%
60–70%
President before election
Richard Nixon
Republican
Elected President
Richard Nixon
Republican

The 1972 United States presidential election in Kentucky took place on November 7, 1972, as part of the 1972 United States presidential election. Kentucky voters chose 9 representatives, or electors, to the Electoral College, who voted for president and vice president.

Kentucky was won by incumbent President Richard Nixon (R–California) with 63.77 percent of the popular vote against Senator George McGovern (D–South Dakota) with 34.77%. Nixon won all but eight of the 120 counties in the state. Electors Frank Stubblefield (D), Romano L. Mazzoli (D), Gene Snyder (R), Tim Lee Carter (R), William P. Curlin Jr. (D), Carl D. Perkins (D), John Sherman Cooper (R), and Marlow W. Cook (R) were pledged to and voted for Nixon.

This was the first time ever that a Republican won Franklin County, Harrison County, Henry County, Meade County, Owen County, or Trimble County, and the first time that every county in the Jackson Purchase voted Republican. Nixon was also the first Republican since Abraham Lincoln in 1864 to carry Fulton County, Marshall County, or Hickman County.

== Results ==
Presidential Candidate	Running Mate	Party	Electoral Vote (EV)	Popular Vote (PV)	
Richard Nixon of California (incumbent)	Spiro Agnew (incumbent)	Republican	9	676,446	63.37%
George McGovern	Sargent Shriver	Democratic	0	371,159	34.77%
John G. Schmitz	Thomas J. Anderson	American	0	17,627	1.65%
Benjamin Spock	Julius Hobson	People's	0	1,118	0.10%
Linda Jenness	Andrew Pulley	Socialist Workers	0	685	0.06%
Gus Hall	Jarvis Tyner	Communist	0	464	0.04%

=== Results by county ===
County	Richard Nixon Republican		George McGovern Democratic		John G. Schmitz American		Various candidates Other parties		Margin		Total votes cast
County	#	%	#	%	#	%	#	%	#	%	Total votes cast
Adair	3,859	69.77%	1,610	29.11%	55	0.99%	7	0.13%	2,249	40.66%	5,531
Allen	3,025	69.83%	1,259	29.06%	43	0.99%	5	0.12%	1,766	40.77%	4,332
Anderson	2,298	62.62%	1,302	35.48%	60	1.63%	10	0.27%	996	27.14%	3,670
Ballard	1,542	49.92%	1,411	45.68%	128	4.14%	8	0.26%	131	4.24%	3,089
Barren	6,070	62.60%	3,384	34.90%	230	2.37%	12	0.12%	2,686	27.70%	9,696
Bath	1,919	58.47%	1,347	41.04%	12	0.37%	4	0.12%	572	17.43%	3,282
Bell	6,518	66.06%	3,219	32.62%	96	0.97%	34	0.34%	3,299	33.44%	9,867
Boone	7,355	71.55%	2,595	25.24%	316	3.07%	14	0.14%	4,760	46.31%	10,280
Bourbon	3,180	62.02%	1,860	36.28%	78	1.52%	9	0.18%	1,320	25.74%	5,127
Boyd	12,812	65.92%	6,434	33.10%	170	0.87%	21	0.11%	6,378	32.82%	19,437
Boyle	4,317	63.66%	2,395	35.32%	54	0.80%	15	0.22%	1,922	28.34%	6,781
Bracken	1,628	64.30%	873	34.48%	29	1.15%	2	0.08%	755	29.82%	2,532
Breathitt	1,846	40.65%	2,677	58.95%	13	0.29%	5	0.11%	-831	-18.30%	4,541
Breckinridge	3,574	64.25%	1,921	34.53%	62	1.11%	6	0.11%	1,653	29.72%	5,563
Bullitt	4,517	59.80%	2,827	37.43%	191	2.53%	18	0.24%	1,690	22.37%	7,553
Butler	2,941	77.03%	835	21.87%	36	0.94%	6	0.16%	2,106	55.16%	3,818
Caldwell	2,952	66.32%	1,345	30.22%	139	3.12%	15	0.34%	1,607	36.10%	4,451
Calloway	5,167	59.17%	3,468	39.72%	85	0.97%	12	0.14%	1,699	19.45%	8,732
Campbell	20,025	68.01%	8,585	29.16%	770	2.62%	65	0.22%	11,440	38.85%	29,445
Carlisle	1,169	55.75%	872	41.58%	48	2.29%	8	0.38%	297	14.17%	2,097
Carroll	1,228	47.71%	1,308	50.82%	35	1.36%	3	0.12%	-80	-3.11%	2,574
Carter	4,082	60.68%	2,591	38.52%	39	0.58%	15	0.22%	1,491	22.16%	6,727
Casey	3,727	78.83%	913	19.31%	53	1.12%	35	0.74%	2,814	59.52%	4,728
Christian	7,414	63.34%	4,063	34.71%	215	1.84%	13	0.11%	3,351	28.63%	11,705
Clark	4,506	68.43%	2,020	30.68%	51	0.77%	8	0.12%	2,486	37.75%	6,585
Clay	4,046	69.99%	1,709	29.56%	22	0.38%	4	0.07%	2,337	40.43%	5,781
Clinton	2,632	79.59%	659	19.93%	13	0.39%	3	0.09%	1,973	59.66%	3,307
Crittenden	2,248	71.52%	859	27.33%	32	1.02%	4	0.13%	1,389	44.19%	3,143
Cumberland	2,294	76.42%	686	22.85%	20	0.67%	2	0.07%	1,608	53.57%	3,002
Daviess	17,234	65.64%	8,168	31.11%	757	2.88%	97	0.37%	9,066	34.53%	26,256
Edmonson	2,327	75.70%	722	23.49%	17	0.55%	8	0.26%	1,605	52.21%	3,074
Elliott	782	34.04%	1,499	65.26%	7	0.30%	9	0.39%	-717	-31.22%	2,297
Estill	3,054	69.42%	1,322	30.05%	20	0.45%	3	0.07%	1,732	39.37%	4,399
Fayette	42,362	66.54%	19,828	31.14%	1,315	2.07%	161	0.25%	22,534	35.40%	63,666
Fleming	2,484	62.38%	1,455	36.54%	25	0.63%	18	0.45%	1,029	25.84%	3,982
Floyd	6,099	44.20%	7,544	54.67%	117	0.85%	40	0.29%	-1,445	-10.47%	13,800
Franklin	7,781	56.88%	5,601	40.95%	264	1.93%	33	0.24%	2,180	15.93%	13,679
Fulton	1,807	61.32%	1,024	34.75%	111	3.77%	5	0.17%	783	26.57%	2,947
Gallatin	719	53.38%	612	45.43%	14	1.04%	2	0.15%	107	7.95%	1,347
Garrard	3,143	67.49%	1,441	30.94%	65	1.40%	8	0.17%	1,702	36.55%	4,657
Grant	2,086	64.03%	1,054	32.35%	111	3.41%	7	0.21%	1,032	31.68%	3,258
Graves	6,098	60.38%	3,701	36.64%	266	2.63%	35	0.35%	2,397	23.74%	10,100
Grayson	4,155	67.99%	1,839	30.09%	98	1.60%	19	0.31%	2,316	37.90%	6,111
Green	2,755	68.82%	1,209	30.20%	36	0.90%	3	0.07%	1,546	38.62%	4,003
Greenup	6,828	59.70%	4,491	39.27%	104	0.91%	14	0.12%	2,337	20.43%	11,437
Hancock	1,583	64.61%	791	32.29%	67	2.73%	9	0.37%	792	32.32%	2,450
Hardin	8,740	65.93%	4,060	30.63%	429	3.24%	27	0.20%	4,680	35.30%	13,256
Harlan	6,527	59.42%	4,349	39.59%	80	0.73%	29	0.26%	2,178	19.83%	10,985
Harrison	2,732	59.70%	1,780	38.90%	53	1.16%	11	0.24%	952	20.80%	4,576
Hart	3,582	60.31%	2,307	38.84%	41	0.69%	9	0.15%	1,275	21.47%	5,939
Henderson	6,231	60.68%	3,889	37.87%	113	1.10%	36	0.35%	2,342	22.81%	10,269
Henry	1,919	52.49%	1,688	46.17%	47	1.29%	2	0.05%	231	6.32%	3,656
Hickman	1,430	56.66%	976	38.67%	113	4.48%	5	0.20%	454	17.99%	2,524
Hopkins	7,133	68.67%	3,129	30.12%	112	1.08%	14	0.13%	4,004	38.55%	10,388
Jackson	5,303	92.18%	436	7.58%	6	0.10%	8	0.14%	4,867	84.60%	5,753
Jefferson	142,436	60.41%	88,143	37.39%	4,766	2.02%	419	0.18%	54,293	23.02%	235,764
Jessamine	3,819	72.91%	1,269	24.23%	133	2.54%	17	0.32%	2,550	48.68%	5,238
Johnson	4,907	72.25%	1,840	27.09%	33	0.49%	12	0.18%	3,067	45.16%	6,792
Kenton	28,076	66.66%	12,872	30.56%	1,055	2.50%	118	0.28%	15,204	36.10%	42,121
Knott	1,479	34.50%	2,774	64.71%	24	0.56%	10	0.23%	-1,295	-30.21%	4,287
Knox	5,017	72.93%	1,805	26.24%	36	0.52%	21	0.31%	3,212	46.69%	6,879
LaRue	2,449	61.53%	1,483	37.26%	40	1.01%	8	0.20%	966	24.27%	3,980
Laurel	7,276	75.63%	2,274	23.64%	62	0.64%	8	0.08%	5,002	51.99%	9,620
Lawrence	2,392	60.48%	1,529	38.66%	31	0.78%	3	0.08%	863	21.82%	3,955
Lee	1,629	68.22%	744	31.16%	12	0.50%	3	0.13%	885	37.06%	2,388
Leslie	3,299	77.88%	913	21.55%	7	0.17%	17	0.40%	2,386	56.33%	4,236
Letcher	4,213	58.54%	2,908	40.41%	59	0.82%	17	0.24%	1,305	18.13%	7,197
Lewis	3,124	71.57%	1,200	27.49%	31	0.71%	10	0.23%	1,924	44.08%	4,365
Lincoln	3,623	65.03%	1,882	33.78%	54	0.97%	12	0.22%	1,741	31.25%	5,571
Livingston	1,673	59.96%	1,065	38.17%	47	1.68%	5	0.18%	608	21.79%	2,790
Logan	3,573	57.86%	2,459	39.82%	127	2.06%	16	0.26%	1,114	18.04%	6,175
Lyon	1,030	58.52%	687	39.03%	41	2.33%	2	0.11%	343	19.49%	1,760
Madison	8,659	65.60%	4,328	32.79%	178	1.35%	34	0.26%	4,331	32.81%	13,199
Magoffin	2,243	52.39%	2,024	47.28%	8	0.19%	6	0.14%	219	5.11%	4,281
Marion	2,370	49.74%	2,351	49.34%	31	0.65%	13	0.27%	19	0.40%	4,765
Marshall	4,290	59.16%	2,806	38.69%	147	2.03%	9	0.12%	1,484	20.47%	7,252
Martin	2,495	77.87%	661	20.63%	40	1.25%	8	0.25%	1,834	57.24%	3,204
Mason	3,529	58.46%	2,459	40.73%	42	0.70%	7	0.12%	1,070	17.73%	6,037
McCracken	11,260	57.69%	7,567	38.77%	642	3.29%	49	0.25%	3,693	18.92%	19,518
McCreary	3,203	80.56%	684	17.20%	81	2.04%	8	0.20%	2,519	63.36%	3,976
McLean	2,298	65.10%	1,191	33.74%	36	1.02%	5	0.14%	1,107	31.36%	3,530
Meade	2,492	60.93%	1,541	37.68%	51	1.25%	6	0.15%	951	23.25%	4,090
Menifee	596	43.89%	732	53.90%	28	2.06%	2	0.15%	-136	-10.01%	1,358
Mercer	3,575	66.08%	1,707	31.55%	118	2.18%	10	0.18%	1,868	34.53%	5,410
Metcalfe	1,896	58.55%	1,308	40.40%	25	0.77%	9	0.28%	588	18.15%	3,238
Monroe	3,770	82.57%	768	16.82%	24	0.53%	4	0.09%	3,002	65.75%	4,566
Montgomery	2,868	62.63%	1,657	36.19%	46	1.00%	8	0.17%	1,211	26.44%	4,579
Morgan	1,535	45.56%	1,815	53.87%	11	0.33%	8	0.24%	-280	-8.31%	3,369
Muhlenberg	5,596	62.33%	3,246	36.16%	130	1.45%	6	0.07%	2,350	26.17%	8,978
Nelson	3,495	53.54%	2,828	43.32%	181	2.77%	24	0.37%	667	10.22%	6,528
Nicholas	1,076	56.22%	804	42.01%	33	1.72%	1	0.05%	272	14.21%	1,914
Ohio	2,392	71.75%	906	27.17%	31	0.93%	5	0.15%	1,486	44.58%	3,334
Oldham	3,041	68.00%	1,311	29.32%	110	2.46%	10	0.22%	1,730	38.68%	4,472
Owen	1,456	54.92%	1,161	43.79%	32	1.21%	2	0.08%	295	11.13%	2,651
Owsley	1,328	83.68%	251	15.82%	7	0.44%	1	0.06%	1,077	67.86%	1,587
Pendleton	1,966	67.28%	909	31.11%	40	1.37%	7	0.24%	1,057	36.17%	2,922
Perry	5,373	59.37%	3,601	39.79%	54	0.60%	22	0.24%	1,772	19.58%	9,050
Pike	12,535	56.46%	9,513	42.85%	119	0.54%	33	0.15%	3,022	13.61%	22,200
Powell	1,766	58.40%	1,230	40.67%	17	0.56%	11	0.36%	536	17.73%	3,024
Pulaski	10,602	76.99%	3,080	22.37%	80	0.58%	8	0.06%	7,522	54.62%	13,770
Robertson	456	51.01%	421	47.09%	15	1.68%	2	0.22%	35	3.92%	894
Rockcastle	3,437	77.31%	968	21.77%	33	0.74%	8	0.18%	2,469	55.54%	4,446
Rowan	3,245	59.45%	2,169	39.74%	32	0.59%	12	0.22%	1,076	19.71%	5,458
Russell	3,992	76.48%	1,169	22.39%	41	0.79%	18	0.34%	2,823	54.09%	5,220
Scott	3,255	64.76%	1,642	32.67%	119	2.37%	10	0.20%	1,613	32.09%	5,026
Shelby	3,893	64.19%	2,074	34.20%	87	1.43%	11	0.18%	1,819	29.99%	6,065
Simpson	2,285	62.57%	1,325	36.28%	33	0.90%	9	0.25%	960	26.29%	3,652
Spencer	1,120	68.75%	481	29.53%	24	1.47%	4	0.25%	639	39.22%	1,629
Taylor	4,035	67.79%	1,859	31.23%	48	0.81%	10	0.17%	2,176	36.56%	5,952
Todd	1,964	59.25%	1,222	36.86%	117	3.53%	12	0.36%	742	22.39%	3,315
Trigg	1,767	52.95%	1,514	45.37%	49	1.47%	7	0.21%	253	7.58%	3,337
Trimble	935	54.61%	757	44.22%	18	1.05%	2	0.12%	178	10.39%	1,712
Union	2,701	58.67%	1,855	40.29%	29	0.63%	19	0.41%	846	18.38%	4,604
Warren	12,481	66.78%	5,934	31.75%	194	1.04%	82	0.44%	6,547	35.03%	18,691
Washington	2,378	58.70%	1,552	38.31%	106	2.62%	15	0.37%	826	20.39%	4,051
Wayne	3,514	64.83%	1,853	34.19%	40	0.74%	13	0.24%	1,661	30.64%	5,420
Webster	2,396	57.57%	1,712	41.13%	42	1.01%	12	0.29%	684	16.44%	4,162
Whitley	6,788	74.91%	2,199	24.27%	53	0.58%	22	0.24%	4,589	50.64%	9,062
Wolfe	936	48.83%	957	49.92%	19	0.99%	5	0.26%	-21	-1.09%	1,917
Woodford	3,363	70.34%	1,268	26.52%	145	3.03%	5	0.10%	2,095	43.82%	4,781
Totals	676,446	63.37%	371,159	34.77%	17,627	1.65%	2,267	0.21%	305,287	28.60%	1,067,499
