= 1976 United States presidential election in Kentucky =

- November 2, 1976

Nominee	Jimmy Carter	Gerald Ford
Party	Democratic	Republican
Home state	Georgia	Michigan
Running mate	Walter Mondale	Bob Dole
Electoral vote	9	0
Popular vote	615,717	531,852
Percentage	52.75%	45.57%
County results
Carter
40–50%
50–60%
60–70%
70–80%
80–90%
Ford
50–60%
60–70%
70–80%
Tie
40–50%
President before election
Gerald Ford
Republican
Elected President
Jimmy Carter
Democratic

The 1976 United States presidential election in Kentucky took place on November 2, 1976, as part of the 1976 United States presidential election. Voters chose 9 representatives, or electors, to the Electoral College, who voted for president and vice president.

Kentucky was won by Jimmy Carter (D–Georgia), with 52.75 percent of the popular vote. Carter defeated incumbent President Gerald Ford (R–Michigan), who finished with 45.57 percent of the popular vote, and did so by winning all major demographic groups in the Commonwealth. No third-party candidate amounted to 1 percent of the vote; American Party candidate Thomas Anderson came the closest with 0.71 percent.

Carter went on to become the 39th president of the United States. As of the 2024 presidential election, this is the last election in which Warren County, Hardin County, Madison County, Christian County, Taylor County, and Lincoln County voted for a Democratic presidential candidate, and the last in which Boone County did not support the Republican candidate, as voters in Boone County gave exactly the same number of votes to Ford as they did to Carter. This is also the last presidential election in which a Democratic presidential candidate won a majority of the vote in the state.

== Results ==
Presidential Candidate	Running Mate	Party	Electoral Vote (EV)	Popular Vote (PV)	
Jimmy Carter of Georgia	Walter Mondale	Democratic	9	615,717	52.75%
Gerald Ford (incumbent)	Robert Dole	Republican	0	531,852	45.57%
Thomas J. Anderson	Rufus Shackelford	American	0	8,308	0.71%
Eugene McCarthy	—	Independent	0	6,837	0.59%
Lester Maddox	William Dyke	American Independent	0	2,328	0.20%
Roger MacBride	David Bergland	Libertarian	0	814	0.07%
Lyndon LaRouche	R. Wayne Evans	U.S. Labor	0	510	0.04%
Gus Hall	Jarvis Tyner	Communist	0	426	0.04%
Peter Camejo	Willie Mae Reid	Socialist Workers	0	350	0.03%

=== Results by county ===
County	Jimmy Carter Democratic		Gerald Ford Republican		Thomas Anderson American		Eugene McCarthy Independent		Various candidates Other parties		Margin		Total votes cast
County	#	%	#	%	#	%	#	%	#	%	#	%	Total votes cast
Adair	2,366	42.00%	3,201	56.82%	26	0.46%	10	0.18%	31	0.55%	-835	-14.82%	5,634
Allen	2,231	46.69%	2,508	52.49%	11	0.23%	10	0.21%	18	0.38%	-277	-5.80%	4,778
Anderson	2,388	57.79%	1,682	40.71%	34	0.82%	15	0.36%	13	0.31%	706	17.08%	4,132
Ballard	2,794	75.66%	649	17.57%	216	5.85%	16	0.43%	18	0.49%	2,145	58.09%	3,693
Barren	5,878	60.16%	3,797	38.86%	55	0.56%	22	0.23%	19	0.19%	2,081	21.30%	9,771
Bath	2,113	68.80%	938	30.54%	9	0.29%	7	0.23%	4	0.13%	1,175	38.26%	3,071
Bell	5,284	50.41%	5,035	48.03%	100	0.95%	30	0.29%	34	0.32%	249	2.38%	10,483
Boone	5,602	49.21%	5,602	49.21%	63	0.55%	75	0.66%	43	0.38%	0	0.00%	11,385
Bourbon	3,504	59.35%	2,260	38.28%	88	1.49%	30	0.51%	22	0.37%	1,244	21.07%	5,904
Boyd	11,150	54.50%	9,106	44.51%	50	0.24%	84	0.41%	69	0.34%	2,044	9.99%	20,459
Boyle	4,095	53.16%	3,511	45.58%	21	0.27%	45	0.58%	31	0.40%	584	7.58%	7,703
Bracken	1,577	63.21%	879	35.23%	19	0.76%	12	0.48%	8	0.32%	698	27.98%	2,495
Breathitt	3,544	77.45%	1,014	22.16%	5	0.11%	7	0.15%	6	0.13%	2,530	55.29%	4,576
Breckinridge	3,347	54.77%	2,698	44.15%	20	0.33%	25	0.41%	21	0.34%	649	10.62%	6,111
Bullitt	5,623	59.40%	3,639	38.44%	100	1.06%	56	0.59%	49	0.52%	1,984	20.96%	9,467
Butler	1,588	39.89%	2,363	59.36%	6	0.15%	10	0.25%	14	0.35%	-775	-19.47%	3,981
Caldwell	3,016	61.56%	1,808	36.91%	46	0.94%	15	0.31%	14	0.29%	1,208	24.65%	4,899
Calloway	8,141	70.75%	3,171	27.56%	55	0.48%	90	0.78%	50	0.43%	4,970	43.19%	11,507
Campbell	12,423	43.10%	15,798	54.81%	100	0.35%	379	1.32%	121	0.42%	-3,375	-11.71%	28,821
Carlisle	1,985	80.82%	435	17.71%	22	0.90%	8	0.33%	6	0.24%	1,550	63.11%	2,456
Carroll	2,251	72.64%	815	26.30%	11	0.35%	11	0.35%	11	0.35%	1,436	46.34%	3,099
Carter	3,915	54.89%	3,185	44.65%	6	0.08%	11	0.15%	16	0.22%	730	10.24%	7,133
Casey	1,602	31.84%	3,379	67.15%	27	0.54%	17	0.34%	7	0.14%	-1,777	-35.31%	5,032
Christian	7,845	60.75%	4,964	38.44%	38	0.29%	32	0.25%	35	0.27%	2,881	22.31%	12,914
Clark	4,575	58.90%	3,114	40.09%	19	0.24%	39	0.50%	21	0.27%	1,461	18.81%	7,768
Clay	1,674	31.37%	3,652	68.44%	2	0.04%	6	0.11%	2	0.04%	-1,978	-37.07%	5,336
Clinton	987	29.12%	2,354	69.46%	11	0.32%	7	0.21%	30	0.89%	-1,367	-40.34%	3,389
Crittenden	1,715	51.16%	1,596	47.61%	21	0.63%	13	0.39%	7	0.21%	119	3.55%	3,352
Cumberland	853	33.76%	1,653	65.41%	7	0.28%	7	0.28%	7	0.28%	-800	-31.65%	2,527
Daviess	14,114	51.41%	12,826	46.72%	266	0.97%	175	0.64%	73	0.27%	1,288	4.69%	27,454
Edmonson	1,418	41.57%	1,976	57.93%	7	0.21%	4	0.12%	6	0.18%	-558	-16.36%	3,411
Elliott	1,987	80.74%	455	18.49%	5	0.20%	8	0.33%	6	0.24%	1,532	62.25%	2,461
Estill	2,034	47.15%	2,250	52.16%	6	0.14%	16	0.37%	8	0.19%	-216	-5.01%	4,314
Fayette	28,012	43.10%	35,170	54.12%	628	0.97%	897	1.38%	282	0.43%	-7,158	-11.02%	64,989
Fleming	2,317	58.17%	1,647	41.35%	8	0.20%	10	0.25%	1	0.03%	670	16.82%	3,983
Floyd	10,151	76.13%	3,108	23.31%	21	0.16%	24	0.18%	29	0.22%	7,043	52.82%	13,333
Franklin	10,475	63.71%	5,536	33.67%	240	1.46%	124	0.75%	66	0.40%	4,939	30.04%	16,441
Fulton	2,370	68.30%	1,060	30.55%	27	0.78%	9	0.26%	4	0.12%	1,310	37.75%	3,470
Gallatin	1,164	71.72%	436	26.86%	7	0.43%	6	0.37%	10	0.62%	728	44.86%	1,623
Garrard	1,887	47.32%	2,045	51.28%	42	1.05%	7	0.18%	7	0.18%	-158	-3.96%	3,988
Grant	2,336	64.28%	1,212	33.35%	70	1.93%	6	0.17%	10	0.28%	1,124	30.93%	3,634
Graves	8,982	72.32%	3,195	25.72%	172	1.38%	33	0.27%	38	0.31%	5,787	46.60%	12,420
Grayson	3,064	45.13%	3,658	53.87%	36	0.53%	12	0.18%	20	0.29%	-594	-8.74%	6,790
Green	2,085	46.14%	2,397	53.04%	5	0.11%	10	0.22%	22	0.49%	-312	-6.90%	4,519
Greenup	6,880	57.27%	5,062	42.14%	21	0.17%	27	0.22%	23	0.19%	1,818	15.13%	12,013
Hancock	1,562	56.86%	1,124	40.92%	41	1.49%	14	0.51%	6	0.22%	438	15.94%	2,747
Hardin	7,977	52.53%	6,965	45.87%	113	0.74%	81	0.53%	49	0.32%	1,012	6.66%	15,185
Harlan	7,300	60.80%	4,624	38.51%	16	0.13%	38	0.32%	28	0.23%	2,676	22.29%	12,006
Harrison	3,582	64.53%	1,911	34.43%	21	0.38%	24	0.43%	13	0.23%	1,671	30.10%	5,551
Hart	3,189	60.81%	2,013	38.39%	7	0.13%	15	0.29%	20	0.38%	1,176	22.42%	5,244
Henderson	7,916	65.32%	4,053	33.45%	56	0.46%	59	0.49%	34	0.28%	3,863	31.87%	12,118
Henry	2,985	70.73%	1,192	28.25%	7	0.17%	22	0.52%	14	0.33%	1,793	42.48%	4,220
Hickman	2,035	74.93%	585	21.54%	87	3.20%	5	0.18%	4	0.15%	1,450	53.39%	2,716
Hopkins	7,749	59.65%	5,115	39.38%	37	0.28%	48	0.37%	41	0.32%	2,634	20.27%	12,990
Jackson	680	19.62%	2,766	79.80%	8	0.23%	5	0.14%	7	0.20%	-2,086	-60.18%	3,466
Jefferson	122,731	47.31%	130,262	50.21%	2,831	1.09%	2,272	0.88%	1,349	0.52%	-7,531	-2.90%	259,445
Jessamine	2,795	46.55%	3,081	51.32%	74	1.23%	33	0.55%	21	0.35%	-286	-4.77%	6,004
Johnson	3,683	42.65%	4,891	56.64%	16	0.19%	21	0.24%	24	0.28%	-1,208	-13.99%	8,635
Kenton	18,833	45.18%	22,087	52.99%	176	0.42%	429	1.03%	155	0.37%	-3,254	-7.81%	41,680
Knott	4,762	82.40%	962	16.65%	5	0.09%	14	0.24%	36	0.62%	3,800	65.75%	5,779
Knox	3,642	42.05%	4,931	56.93%	13	0.15%	24	0.28%	51	0.59%	-1,289	-14.88%	8,661
LaRue	2,207	60.38%	1,409	38.55%	14	0.38%	11	0.30%	14	0.38%	798	21.83%	3,655
Laurel	3,813	37.85%	6,186	61.41%	28	0.28%	18	0.18%	28	0.28%	-2,373	-23.56%	10,073
Lawrence	2,402	56.08%	1,838	42.91%	13	0.30%	11	0.26%	19	0.44%	564	13.17%	4,283
Lee	1,091	42.57%	1,449	56.54%	3	0.12%	7	0.27%	13	0.51%	-358	-13.97%	2,563
Leslie	1,478	28.04%	3,770	71.52%	8	0.15%	8	0.15%	7	0.13%	-2,292	-43.48%	5,271
Letcher	4,590	59.24%	3,122	40.29%	9	0.12%	10	0.13%	17	0.22%	1,468	18.95%	7,748
Lewis	1,929	44.53%	2,383	55.01%	6	0.14%	6	0.14%	8	0.18%	-454	-10.48%	4,332
Lincoln	3,198	53.97%	2,694	45.47%	14	0.24%	5	0.08%	14	0.24%	504	8.50%	5,925
Livingston	2,497	73.12%	878	25.71%	25	0.73%	4	0.12%	11	0.32%	1,619	47.41%	3,415
Logan	4,850	65.64%	2,430	32.89%	67	0.91%	16	0.22%	26	0.35%	2,420	32.75%	7,389
Lyon	1,606	72.31%	585	26.34%	22	0.99%	3	0.14%	5	0.23%	1,021	45.97%	2,221
Madison	7,299	51.71%	6,581	46.63%	106	0.75%	88	0.62%	40	0.28%	718	5.08%	14,114
Magoffin	2,451	57.49%	1,793	42.06%	3	0.07%	3	0.07%	13	0.30%	658	15.43%	4,263
Marion	3,520	66.14%	1,723	32.38%	27	0.51%	30	0.56%	22	0.41%	1,797	33.76%	5,322
Marshall	6,906	71.83%	2,578	26.82%	63	0.66%	23	0.24%	44	0.46%	4,328	45.01%	9,614
Martin	1,267	37.12%	2,120	62.12%	4	0.12%	7	0.21%	15	0.44%	-853	-25.00%	3,413
Mason	3,397	56.58%	2,529	42.12%	26	0.43%	36	0.60%	16	0.27%	868	14.46%	6,004
McCracken	14,956	65.92%	6,997	30.84%	535	2.36%	125	0.55%	74	0.33%	7,959	35.08%	22,687
McCreary	1,827	35.53%	3,272	63.63%	22	0.43%	10	0.19%	11	0.21%	-1,445	-28.10%	5,142
McLean	2,346	65.29%	1,212	33.73%	3	0.08%	12	0.33%	20	0.56%	1,134	31.56%	3,593
Meade	3,030	62.24%	1,755	36.05%	20	0.41%	41	0.84%	22	0.45%	1,275	26.19%	4,868
Menifee	1,041	76.77%	304	22.42%	5	0.37%	1	0.07%	5	0.37%	737	54.35%	1,356
Mercer	3,411	56.94%	2,451	40.91%	85	1.42%	21	0.35%	23	0.38%	960	16.03%	5,991
Metcalfe	1,877	57.47%	1,356	41.52%	14	0.43%	4	0.12%	15	0.46%	521	15.95%	3,266
Monroe	1,412	29.45%	3,352	69.91%	6	0.13%	14	0.29%	11	0.23%	-1,940	-40.46%	4,795
Montgomery	3,141	60.01%	2,032	38.82%	17	0.32%	22	0.42%	22	0.42%	1,109	21.19%	5,234
Morgan	2,897	74.34%	973	24.97%	8	0.21%	8	0.21%	11	0.28%	1,924	49.37%	3,897
Muhlenberg	7,058	61.65%	4,292	37.49%	28	0.24%	31	0.27%	40	0.35%	2,766	24.16%	11,449
Nelson	4,454	59.36%	2,804	37.37%	138	1.84%	65	0.87%	43	0.57%	1,650	21.99%	7,504
Nicholas	1,582	66.53%	738	31.03%	45	1.89%	3	0.13%	10	0.42%	844	35.50%	2,378
Ohio	3,508	47.81%	3,764	51.30%	22	0.30%	25	0.34%	18	0.25%	-256	-3.49%	7,337
Oldham	2,819	42.51%	3,695	55.72%	27	0.41%	52	0.78%	38	0.57%	-876	-13.21%	6,631
Owen	2,332	76.43%	676	22.16%	15	0.49%	14	0.46%	14	0.46%	1,656	54.27%	3,051
Owsley	305	22.31%	1,053	77.03%	3	0.22%	5	0.37%	1	0.07%	-748	-54.72%	1,367
Pendleton	2,147	62.65%	1,230	35.89%	19	0.55%	20	0.58%	11	0.32%	917	26.76%	3,427
Perry	5,633	55.68%	4,434	43.83%	10	0.10%	15	0.15%	24	0.24%	1,199	11.85%	10,116
Pike	14,320	60.44%	9,178	38.74%	47	0.20%	46	0.19%	100	0.42%	5,142	21.70%	23,691
Powell	1,859	61.37%	1,148	37.90%	6	0.20%	10	0.33%	6	0.20%	711	23.47%	3,029
Pulaski	5,752	38.14%	9,226	61.17%	29	0.19%	36	0.24%	40	0.27%	-3,474	-23.03%	15,083
Robertson	546	65.94%	275	33.21%	3	0.36%	3	0.36%	1	0.12%	271	32.73%	828
Rockcastle	1,408	35.09%	2,583	64.37%	4	0.10%	11	0.27%	7	0.17%	-1,175	-29.28%	4,013
Rowan	3,541	60.34%	2,244	38.24%	13	0.22%	42	0.72%	28	0.48%	1,297	22.10%	5,868
Russell	1,803	38.10%	2,882	60.90%	14	0.30%	12	0.25%	21	0.44%	-1,079	-22.80%	4,732
Scott	3,118	55.30%	2,408	42.71%	62	1.10%	37	0.66%	13	0.23%	710	12.59%	5,638
Shelby	3,841	56.10%	2,916	42.59%	30	0.44%	32	0.47%	28	0.41%	925	13.51%	6,847
Simpson	2,782	64.71%	1,481	34.45%	14	0.33%	9	0.21%	13	0.30%	1,301	30.26%	4,299
Spencer	1,209	60.97%	742	37.42%	18	0.91%	10	0.50%	4	0.20%	467	23.55%	1,983
Taylor	3,456	50.33%	3,337	48.60%	20	0.29%	25	0.36%	28	0.41%	119	1.73%	6,866
Todd	2,436	67.72%	1,095	30.44%	42	1.17%	11	0.31%	13	0.36%	1,341	37.28%	3,597
Trigg	2,727	72.82%	991	26.46%	11	0.29%	8	0.21%	8	0.21%	1,736	46.36%	3,745
Trimble	1,568	74.21%	517	24.47%	10	0.47%	11	0.52%	7	0.33%	1,051	49.74%	2,113
Union	3,540	66.64%	1,716	32.30%	10	0.19%	21	0.40%	25	0.47%	1,824	34.34%	5,312
Warren	9,657	50.06%	9,439	48.93%	39	0.20%	96	0.50%	60	0.31%	218	1.13%	19,291
Washington	2,376	56.10%	1,765	41.68%	66	1.56%	16	0.38%	12	0.28%	611	14.42%	4,235
Wayne	2,537	43.61%	3,243	55.75%	14	0.24%	12	0.21%	11	0.19%	-706	-12.14%	5,817
Webster	3,523	70.89%	1,402	28.21%	17	0.34%	9	0.18%	19	0.38%	2,121	42.68%	4,970
Whitley	4,212	40.53%	6,100	58.70%	22	0.21%	16	0.15%	42	0.40%	-1,888	-18.17%	10,392
Wolfe	1,777	72.29%	659	26.81%	14	0.57%	2	0.08%	6	0.24%	1,118	45.48%	2,458
Woodford	2,689	49.20%	2,646	48.42%	85	1.56%	32	0.59%	13	0.24%	43	0.78%	5,465
Totals	615,717	52.75%	531,852	45.57%	8,308	0.71%	6,837	0.59%	4,428	0.38%	83,865	7.18%	1,167,142

==== Counties that flipped from Republican to Democratic ====
- Ballard
- Barren
- Boone (became tied)
- Breckinridge
- Bullitt
- Carter
- Christian
- Crittenden
- Caldwell
- Calloway
- Clark
- Daviess
- Fulton
- Franklin
- Fleming
- Hardin
- Hart
- Harlan
- Lawrence
- Letcher
- Livingston
- Lyon
- Madison
- Magoffin
- Marshall
- Metcalfe
- Muhlenberg
- Perry
- Pike
- Taylor
- Union
- Webster
- Warren
- Anderson
- Bath
- Bell
- Bourbon
- Bracken
- Boyd
- Boyle
- Caldwell
- Calloway
- Clark
- Daviess
- Franklin
- Gallatin
- Greenup
- Hancock
- Harrison
- Henderson
- Henry
- Hickman
- Hopkins
- LaRue
- Logan
- Marion
- McCracken
- Mason
- Meade
- McLean
- Mercer
- Montgomery
- Nelson
- Nicholas
- Owen
- Pendleton
- Powell
- Robertson
- Scott
- Rowan
- Simpson
- Spencer
- Shelby
- Todd
- Trigg
- Trimble
- Washington
- Woodford

=== By congressional district ===
Carter won 5 of the state's 7 congressional districts.

District	Carter	Ford	Representative
1st	66.6%	33.4%	Carroll Hubbard
2nd	55.5%	44.5%	William Natcher
3rd	55.5%	44.5%	Romano Mazzoli
4th	42.8%	57.2%	Gene Snyder
5th	43.1%	56.9%	Tim Lee Carter
6th	53.1%	46.9%	John B. Breckinridge
7th	60.9%	39.1%	Carl D. Perkins
