= Kentucky Route 90 =

State highway in Kentucky, United States

Kentucky Route 90
- KY 90; mainline in red, business route in blue

Route information
- Maintained by KYTC
- Length: 134.734 mi (216.833 km)

Major junctions
- West end: I-65 / KY 70 in Cave City
- US 31W in Cave City; US 31E / US 68 / KY 80 in Glasgow; Cumberland Expressway in Glasgow; US 127 in Snow; US 27 / KY 1247 in Burnside; US 27 in Parkers Lake
- East end: US 25W northwest of Williamsburg

Location
- Country: United States
- State: Kentucky
- Counties: Barren, Metcalfe, Cumberland, Clinton, Wayne, Pulaski, McCreary, Whitley

Highway system
- Kentucky State Highway System; Interstate; US; State; Parkways
← KY 89	→ KY 91

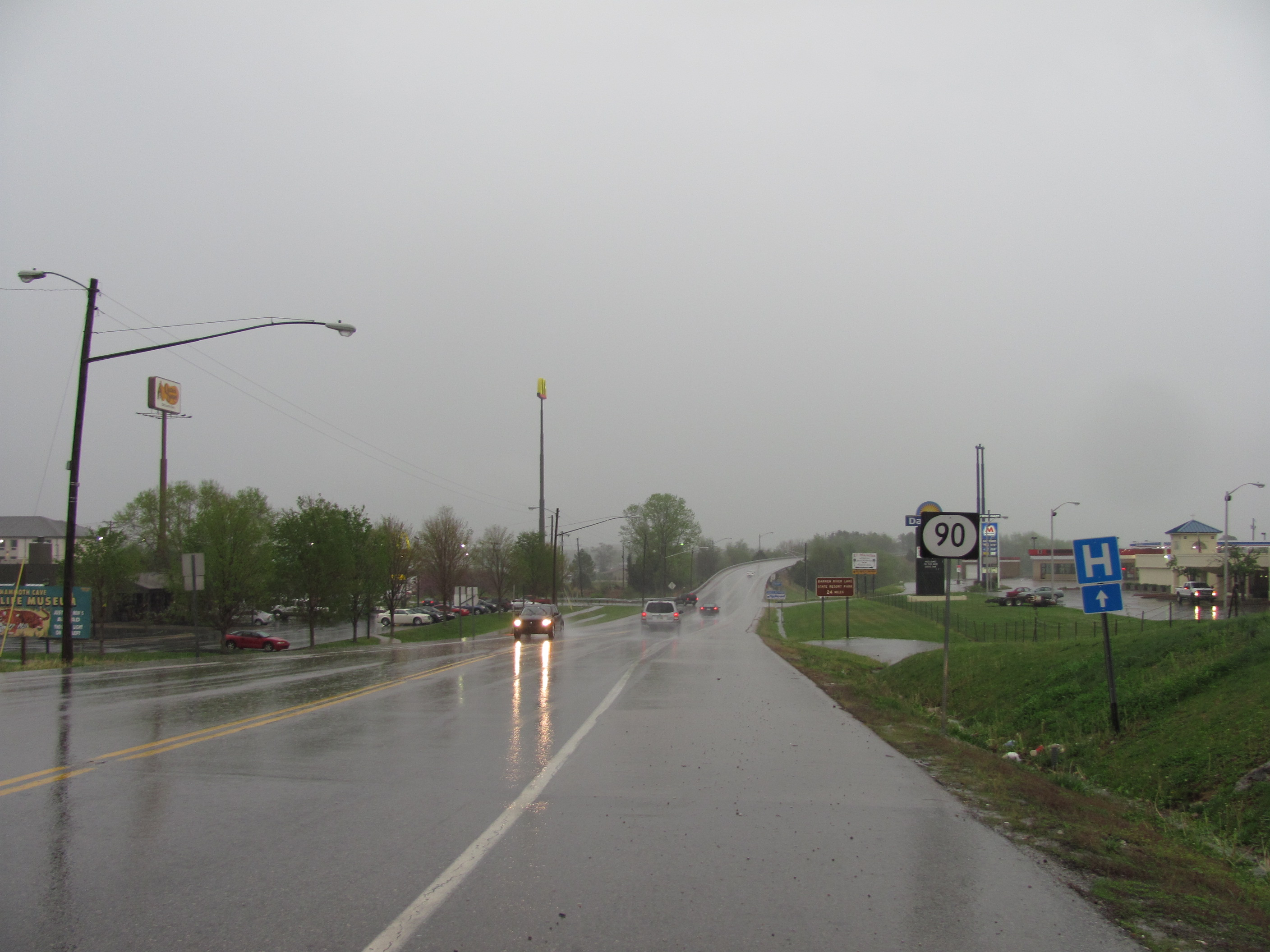
In Cave City, Kentucky

Kentucky Route 90 (KY 90) is a major east–west state highway in southern Kentucky. The route is 134.734 miles (216.833 km) long, and it traverses Barren, Metcalfe, Cumberland, Clinton, Wayne, Pulaski, McCreary and Whitley Counties in southern Kentucky. It runs from the KY 70 junction near Interstate 65 in Cave City to US 25W about 8 miles (13 km) from Interstate 75.

== Route description ==
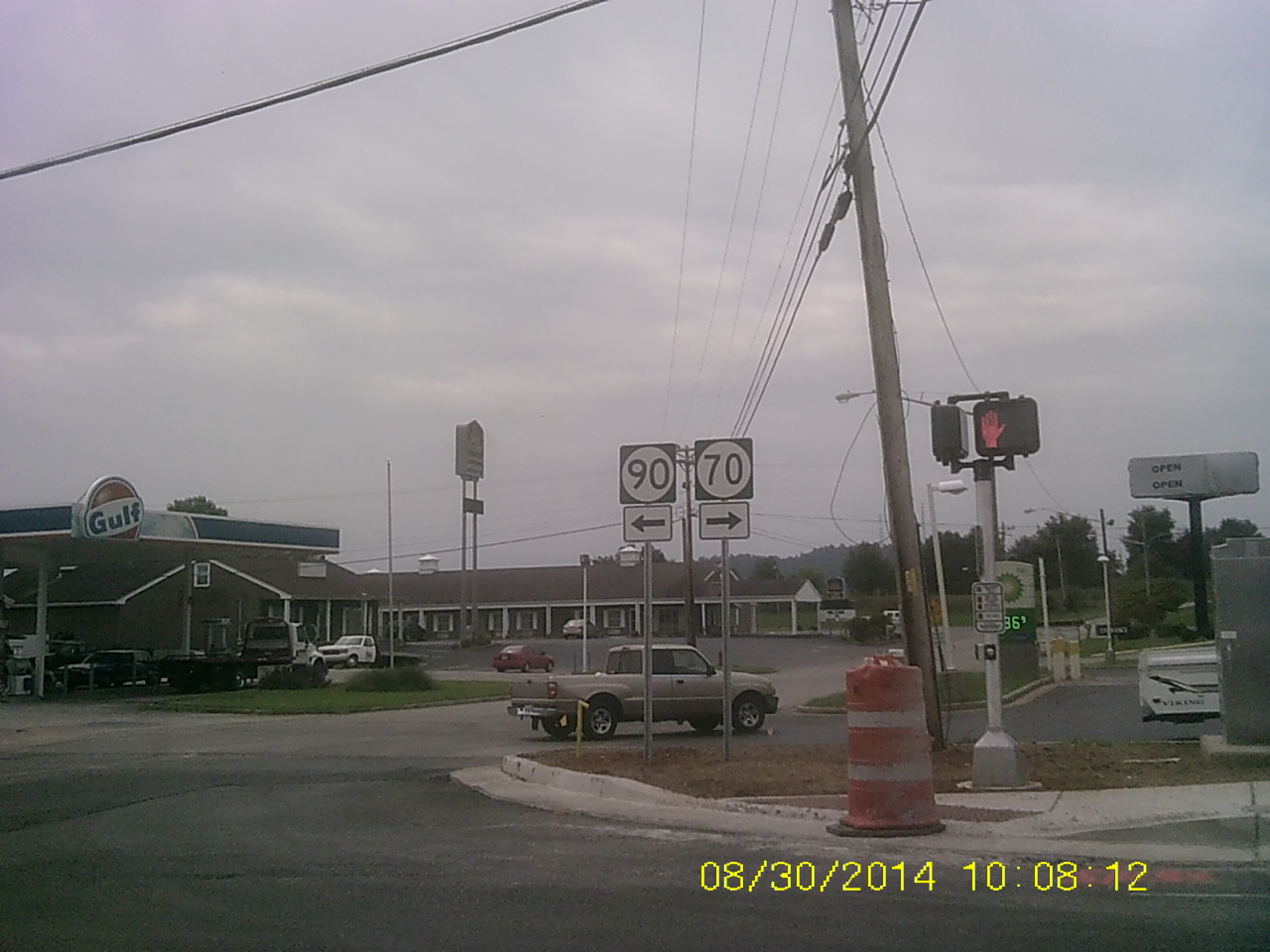
KY 90's western terminus at Cave City.

=== Barren and Metcalfe Counties ===
Kentucky Route 90 begins at Cave City at an intersection with KY 70, equipped with a traffic light, in the one part of the city where many restaurants, hotels, and gas stations are located. It is a major tourism hot-spot due to the close proximity to Mammoth Cave National Park, in nearby Edmonson County, along with few other attractions along KY 70 west of the city. Signs at the I-65 exit tend to imply that KY 90 ends at the exit itself, while official state highway documents indicate that the end is at the intersection with KY 70, about 100 yards (91 m) from the interchange itself. In spite of this, both KY 70 and KY 90 markers appear on the signage for Exit 53 of I-65.

After KY 90's first mile (1.6 km), it intersects U.S. Route 31W, still within city limits of Cave City. KY 90 then heads into a south-southeasterly path to the Barren County seat, Glasgow, where it crosses the Veterans Outer Loop (US 68) just past the Glasgow Municipal Airport, and then has junctions with U.S. Highways 31E and 68 Business, which is co-joined with Kentucky Route 80 in this area. It also has an intersection with US 31E's business loop at the Barren County courthouse. Before leaving the city of Glasgow, KY 90 has an intersection with the Louie B. Nunn Cumberland Expressway at the exit 14 interchange on the southeastern side of the city.

After leaving Glasgow, the highway continues in a southeasterly fashion and passes through the small town of Eighty Eight, and then goes into southern Metcalfe County, and passes through Summer Shade and Beaumont, intersecting KY 163, which connects Edmonton and Tompkinsville, and descends a hill at the headwaters of Marrowbone Creek (the valley of which it follows for about 10 miles) and passes through Willow Shade and the Marrowbone State Forest and Wildlife Management Area, entering Cumberland County.

=== Cumberland and Clinton Counties ===
KY 90 passes through Marrowbone and the county seat, Burkesville, where it has a concurrency with KY 61. It turns due east, crosses the Cumberland River, and has intersections with several roads that lead to Dale Hollow Lake State Park, and then goes into Clinton County, where, for about 1.5 miles (2.4 km), it is co-joined with US 127, which is the core route of the annual World's Longest Yard Sale (a.k.a. The Highway 127 Corridor Sale), which takes place in early August. It cuts through the northern prong of Poplar Mountain, which once had coal mines, and then into Wayne County, where it generally follows a sinkhole plain at the foot of the Pottsville Escarpment, the boundary between the East Kentucky Coal Field and the Eastern Pennyroyal, a limestone karst region.

=== Wayne County and beyond ===
The route and its business route intersect Kentucky Route 92 at Monticello on a northeasterly course, and are known locally as north–south thoroughfares. It passes near Mill Springs, the namesake of a significant early Civil War battle across the Cumberland River (now Lake Cumberland), and a mill built in 1877 (accessible via KY 1275) and maintained by the U.S. Army Corps of Engineers. After entering Pulaski County it becomes a four-lane highway, crosses Lake Cumberland (Cumberland River) and turns south on a concurrency with US 27 from Burnside, Kentucky to cross the Cumberland River for a third time. The concurrency lasts about 14.6 miles (23.5 km) from Burnside to Parkers Lake. Early in this stretch of road is the gateway to General Burnside State Park; it later enters the Daniel Boone National Forest.

After departing US 27 in northern McCreary County, KY 90 is the main route that accesses Cumberland Falls State Resort Park. As it enters Whitley County, it crosses the Cumberland River a fourth and final time just upstream and around a bend from the falls. Near the route's terminus in the Whitley County community of Young's Creek, there is a 0.32 mile-long (0.51 km) spur designated as KY 90S (also signed as KY 90) that serves as a secondary entrance to the highway for traffic going southbound on U.S. Route 25W, while the mainline KY 90 is primarily used for traffic destined for northbound US 25W towards Corbin.

== Points of interest and notable events along the route ==
These are points of interest that can be accessible along this route:

- Mammoth Cave Wildlife Museum at Cave City.
- Crystal Onyx Cave and Campground, on Prewitt's Knob just south of Cave City.
- Roadside park in Marrowbone, on the reputed site of a hospital camp for Union and Confederate soldiers during the Civil War.
- Tyson Foods chicken processing plant in Clinton County, a mile east of the junction with KY 1590.
- Seventy Six Falls (accessible via KY 734 and KY 3062), is a waterfall along the shoreline of Lake Cumberland in northern Clinton County.
- Mill Springs Mill (Wayne County) (accessible via KY 1275).
- General Burnside State Park near Burnside.
- Cumberland Falls State Resort Park at the McCreary/Whitley County line. Cumberland Falls faces due north and thus is the site of a "moonbow" produced by the light of the full moon under the right conditions.

=== Roller Coaster Fair ===
Kentucky Route 90 from Cave City to just north of Albany, along with Kentucky Route 63 from Glasgow to Tompkinsville, Kentucky, along with US Route 127 in Clinton County, and Tennessee State Routes 52, 111, and 51 are designated as the marked route for the annual Roller Coaster Yard Sale, a route-based yard sale event held the first weekend of October. It is named for the "roller coaster" nature of the roads traversing the hills of the Eastern Pennyroyal region.

== Additional information about the route ==
KY 90 from KY 61 in Burkesville to the US 27 junction at Burnside is part of the Appalachian Development Highway System’s Corridor J.

== History ==
=== The early days (1929-1960) ===
KY 90 was established in 1929 as one of the charter routes of the Kentucky State Highway System. The highway's original western terminus was located in downtown Glasgow at a junction with KY 80 (which at the time was not co-signed with US 68 in this area until the 1940s). The route initially used two Cumberland River ferries, at Burkesville and the Whitley/McCreary County line just south of Cumberland Falls, which were replaced with bridges. KY 90's original eastern terminus was at US 25W in downtown Corbin. Sometime between 1940 and 1955, US 25W was rerouted to the west, to put it closer to Cumberland Falls, and that gave it a concurrency with KY 90's eastern end that was abolished by 1957.

Also in the 1950s, after the route of Interstate 65 had been determined, KY 90 was extended northwest from Glasgow, to a junction with U.S. Route 31W south of Cave City, west of Prewitt's Knob. The road that KY 90 took over, Happy Valley Road, was previously signed as Kentucky Route 351.

=== The modern days (1960-present) ===
Sometime between 1969 and 1972, following the completion of I-65, KY 90 was improved from Glasgow and got a new route directly into Cave City, east of Prewitt's Knob. The western terminus then became a new junction with KY 70 just east of the I-65 exit 53 interchange, thus extending KY 90 by another 0.8 miles (1.3 km), and providing westbound KY 90 traffic direct access to I-65.

In 2013, KY 90 between the Cumberland Parkway junction and the Eighty Eight community was reconstructed to add truck-climbing lanes in two spots. Reconstruction of KY 90 continued from that area to the Metcalfe County line, and was completed by Fall 2015. In September and October 2014, the first 0.4 miles (0.64 km) of KY 90, along with the KY 70 overpass over I-65 (the latter of which began in 2013), were both reconstructed and were widened to four lanes, plus a center lane for left turns.

Some talks between the KYTC and Stantec are taking place to widen an 8.4 miles (13.5 km) stretch of KY 90 from Cave City to Glasgow to either a 2+1 type of road (two lanes plus the turning lane in the center) or a complete 4-laner with a 40 metres (130 ft) median. Plans for it are still yet to be placed on the agenda. Opinions of locals are being used for consideration before the project even happens.

== Major intersections ==
County	Location	mi	km	Destinations	Notes
Barren	Cave City	0.000	0.000	KY 70 (Mammoth Cave Road/Mammoth Cave Street) to I-65 – Mammoth Cave, Brownsville, Cave City Business District, Nashville (TN), Louisville	I-65 just west of intersection
Barren	Cave City	0.819	1.318	US 31W (Dixie Highway) to KY 70 – Park City, Horse Cave	
Barren		3.186	5.127	KY 685 (Wilson Road) to KY 2143 (Old Happy Valley Road)	Old Happy Valley Road is old KY 90
Barren	Glasgow	7.886	12.691	Airport Road to Glasgow Municipal Airport	
Barren	Glasgow	8.587	13.819	US 68 (Veterans Outer Loop) / KY 80 to US 31E north	
Barren	Glasgow	9.923	15.970	US 31E north (North L. Rogers Wells Boulevard)	West end of US 31E concurrency
Barren	Glasgow	10.524	16.937	US 31E south (South L. Roger Wells Blvd.) / US 68 Bus. west (West Main Street) to US 68 Truck east / KY 90 Truck east / Cumberland Expressway	East end of US 31E concurrency; west end of US 68 Bus. concurrency. Truck Routes follow US 31E south.
Barren	Glasgow	11.360	18.282	US 31E Bus. north (North Race Street)	West end of US 31E Bus. concurrency
Barren	Glasgow	11.470	18.459	US 31E Bus. south (South Green Street) to KY 63	End of two-block concurrency with one-way 31E Bus. south around courthouse; begin concurrency with 31E Bus. north
Barren	Glasgow	11.525	18.548	US 31E Bus. north / US 68 Bus. / KY 90 west (East Main Street)	End of concurrency with US31E; North 31E Bus./west 68 Bus./west 90 intersect here and continue west
Barren	Glasgow	11.598	18.665	US 68 Bus. east (North Broadway Street)	End of concurrency with US 68 Bus.
Barren	Glasgow	12.154– 12.285	19.560– 19.771	Cumberland Expressway / US 68 Truck west / KY 90 Truck west – Bowling Green, Somerset	Interchange; Truck route follows westbound parkway; exit 14
Barren		14.795	23.810	KY 2198 east (Green Valley Road)	Western terminus of KY 2198
Barren		18.120	29.161	KY 1330 east (Kino Road)	Western terminus of KY 1330
Barren	Eighty Eight	19.058	30.671	KY 839 south (Nobob Road)	Northern terminus of KY 839
Metcalfe	Summer Shade	25.358	40.810	KY 640 north (Randolph-Summer Shade Road)	Southern terminus of KY 640
Metcalfe		27.346	44.009	KY 2387 north (Mount Moriah Road)	Southern terminus of KY 2387
Metcalfe		27.815	44.764	KY 163 (Tompkinsville Road) – Edmonton, Tompkinsville	
Cumberland		36.734	59.118	KY 1312 north	Southern terminus of KY 1312
Cumberland	Marrowbone	39.132	62.977	KY 3115 south	Northern terminus of KY 3115
Cumberland		40.054	64.461	KY 496 north (Old Waterview Road)	Southern terminus of KY 496
Cumberland	Waterview	42.483	68.370	KY 100 west (Old Waterview Road)	Eastern terminus of KY 100
Cumberland		46.212	74.371	KY 691 west	Eastern terminus of KY 691
Cumberland		46.979	75.605	KY 2276 east	Western terminus of KY 2276
Cumberland	Burkesville	48.569	78.164	KY 61 north (North Main Street) – Columbia	Begin concurrency with KY 61
Cumberland	Burkesville	48.828	78.581	KY 61 north (South Main Street)	Southern end of traffic circle around the courthouse
Cumberland	Burkesville	49.401	79.503	KY 61 south (Celina Road) – Dale Hollow Lake State Resort Park, Sulphur Ck Resort, Hendricks Creek Boat Dock, Celina	End of concurrency with KY 61
Cumberland	Burkesville	50.203	80.794	KY 1880 east	Western terminus of KY 1880
Clinton		59.945	96.472	KY 1590 – Jamestown	
Clinton		62.236	100.159	KY 639	
Clinton		62.995	101.381	US 127 north / KY 3156 east – Jamestown, Wolf Creek Dam	West end of concurrency with US 127; western terminus of KY 3156
Clinton		63.582	102.325	US 127 south / KY 724 north – Albany, Clinton County Area Tech Center	East end of concurrency with US 127; southern terminus of KY 724
Clinton		64.392	103.629	KY 3062 west	Eastern terminus of KY 3062
Clinton		64.663	104.065	KY 558	
Clinton		65.840	105.959	KY 2063 west	Eastern terminus of KY 2063
Clinton		66.736	107.401	KY 350 south	Northern terminus of KY 350
Clinton		68.552	110.324	KY 829 north	Southern terminus of KY 829
Clinton		69.328	111.573	KY 2546 north	Southern terminus of KY 2546
Wayne		71.822	115.586	KY 1009	
Wayne	Susie	74.281	119.544	KY 834 south	Western end of KY 834 overlap
Wayne	Susie	74.455	119.824	KY 834 north	Eastern end of KY 834 overlap
Wayne		76.127	122.515	KY 858 east	Western terminus of KY 858
Wayne		77.249	124.320	KY 1546 west	Eastern terminus of KY 1546
Wayne	Monticello	80.742	129.942	KY 90 Bus. east (Albany Road) / KY 3284 north (White Way Inn Road) – Monticello	Western terminus of KY 90 Business route; southern terminus of KY 3284
Wayne	Monticello	82.175	132.248	KY 92 (Columbia Avenue) – Monticello	
Wayne	Monticello	83.862	134.963	KY 90 Bus. west / KY 1275	Eastern terminus of KY 90 Bus.; 90 Bus. to the south, 1275 both ways; Wayne County Airport just northwest of intersection off 1275
Wayne	Steubenville	86.758	139.623	KY 3106	
Wayne	Touristville	90.408	145.498	KY 1275 south / KY 1619 east	Northern terminus of KY 1275; western terminus of KY 1619
Wayne		90.768	146.077	KY 3282 north	Southern terminus of KY 3282
Wayne		93.291	150.137	KY 1619 west	Eastern terminus of KY 1619
Wayne	Frazer	94.218	151.629	KY 1568 south	Northern terminus of KY 1568
Pulaski	Bronston	99.228	159.692	KY 790 south	Northern terminus of KY 790
Pulaski	Bronston–Somerset line	99.437– 99.761	160.028– 160.550	Bridge over the Cumberland River	
Pulaski	Somerset	100.492	161.726	US 27 north to Cumberland Expressway / KY 1247 north / I-75 – Somerset, Whitley City	Interchange; KY 90 follows 27 south; northern/western end of US 27 concurrency; KY 1247 straight ahead
Pulaski	Somerset–Burnside line	100.586– 100.852	161.877– 162.306	Bridge over the Cumberland River	
Pulaski	Burnside	101.420	163.220	KY 2295 Conn. to KY 2295 – General Burnside State Park	
Pulaski	Burnside	101.809	163.846	KY 2294 (French Street)	
Pulaski	Burnside	102.169	164.425	KY 2295 south (East Antioch Avenue)	Northern terminus of KY 2295
Pulaski	Burnside	102.438	164.858	KY 2295 north (West Lakeshore Drive)	Southern terminus of KY 2295
Pulaski		104.297	167.850	KY 804 south (Garland Road)	Northern terminus of KY 804
Pulaski		105.080	169.110	KY 751 south (Keno Road)	Northern terminus of KY 751
McCreary	Greenwood	112.402	180.893	KY 2282 north	Southern terminus of KY 2282
McCreary	Parkers Lake	115.090	185.219	US 27 south	Eastern/southern end of US 27 concurrency
McCreary		116.936	188.190	KY 3254 east (Vanover Ridge Road)	Western terminus of KY 3254
McCreary		119.464	192.259	KY 3255 south (North Beerock Road)	Northern terminus of KY 3255
McCreary		120.000	193.121	KY 3257 east (Mill Creek Road)	Western terminus of KY 3257
McCreary		122.092	196.488	KY 896 north (Warman-Bryant Cemetery Road)	Southern terminus of KY 896
McCreary		124.681	200.655	KY 700 west to KY 1045	Eastern terminus of KY 700
Whitley		134.964	217.204	KY 90 Spur east to US 25W south / I-75 south	Short spur. 90E signed to north US 25W/I-75, spur signed to south US 25W/I-75
Whitley		135.338	217.805	US 25W to I-75	
1.000 mi = 1.609 km; 1.000 km = 0.621 mi: Concurrency terminus

== Special routes ==
=== Glasgow truck route ===
Kentucky Route 90 Truck
- Location: Glasgow, Kentucky

Kentucky Route 90 Truck is a truck route in Glasgow, Kentucky.

The following is a list of routes that are the component routes of KY 90 Truck:

- US 31E from the US 68 Business/KY 90 Junction, and
- Louie B. Nunn Cumberland Parkway between exits 11 and 14.

Additionally, US 68 Truck accompanies this truck route in its entirety.

=== Monticello business route ===
Kentucky Route 90 Business
- Location: Monticello
- Length: 3.535 mi (5.689 km)

Kentucky Route 90 Business is a business route of KY 90 in Monticello, Kentucky. It was the original route of KY 90 until the regular KY 90 was re-routed to the Monticello By-Pass.

The entire route is in Wayne County.

Location	mi	km	Destinations	Notes
Monticello	0.000	0.000	KY 90 / KY 3284 west (White Way Inn Road) – Burkesville, Albany, Somerset	Western terminus
Monticello	0.835	1.344	KY 167 south – Mount Pigsah, Pickett State Park and Forest	Northern terminus of KY-167
Monticello	1.264	2.034	KY 92 west (West Columbia Avenue)	Western end of KY 92 concurency
Monticello	1.327	2.136	KY 92 east (Michigan Avenue) – Stearns, Big South Fork N.R.R.	Eastern End of KY 92 concurrency
Monticello	2.868	4.616	KY 1275 south / KY 3106 east	Southern end of KY 1275 concurrency
Monticello	3.535	5.689	KY 90 / KY 1275 north – Burnside, Somerset, Mill Springs, Burkesville, Mill Springs Mill, General Burnside State Park	Eastern terminus; Northern end of KY 1275 concurrency; KY 1275 continues straight ahead
1.000 mi = 1.609 km; 1.000 km = 0.621 mi: Concurrency terminus

=== Kentucky Route 90 Spur ===
Kentucky Route 90 Spur
- Location: Whitley County
- Length: 0.318 mi (512 m)

Kentucky Route 90 Spur (KY 90S) is a spur route of KY 90 in rural northern Whitley County. Although this route is not signed, the route connects KY 90 with U.S. Route 25W just south of KY 90's eastern terminus east of Cumberland Falls. KY 90S is 0.318 miles (0.512 km) long, and it is said to be the original alignment of KY 90's final 0.374 miles (0.602 km).

== Former special routes ==
=== Glasgow alternate route ===
- Location: Glasgow
- Length: 2.4 mi (3.9 km)
- Existed: 1970s–2000s

In Glasgow, at one time, Alternate KY 90 ran from the US 31E bypass junction with KY 90, continuing as Happy Valley Road, to the intersection with U.S. Route 31E Business (North Race Street), and follows that route until it reaches the Barren County Courthouse, where the mainline KY 90 runs (while being co-signed with US 68 and KY 80, a.k.a. West Main Street). Sometime in the 2000s, that designation was decommissioned. The mainline KY 90 became co-signed with US 31E (L. Roger Wells Blvd) from that intersection to the junction with US 68/KY 80, and KY 90 followed US 68 and KY 80 to the Public Square.
