= Randolph Bowe =

American baseball player

- Pitcher
- Born: December 18, 1918; Amandaville, Kentucky, U.S.
- Died: July 19, 2016 (aged 97); Erie, Pennsylvania, U.S.
- Batted: Left Threw: Left

Negro league baseball debut
- 1938, for the Kansas City Monarchs

Last appearance
- 1940, for the Indianapolis Clowns
- Stats at Baseball Reference

Teams
- Kansas City Monarchs (1938); Chicago American Giants (1939–1940); Indianapolis Clowns (1940)

Randolph Bowe (December 18, 1918 – July 19, 2016), nicknamed "Lefty" and "Bob", was an American Negro league baseball pitcher from 1938 to 1940.

A native of Amandaville, Kentucky, Bowe made his Negro leagues debut in 1938 with the Kansas City Monarchs. He played for the Chicago American Giants in 1939 and 1940, and was selected to play in the 1940 East–West All-Star Game, but declined due to a salary dispute. Bowe died in Erie, Pennsylvania, in 2016 at age 97.
