= Amandaville, Kentucky =

Unincorporated community in Kentucky, United States

Amandaville
- Unincorporated community
- Location within the state of Kentucky Amandaville (the United States)
- Coordinates: 36°53′48″N 85°18′40″W
- Country: United States
- State: Kentucky
- County: Cumberland
- Elevation: 600 ft (180 m)
- Time zone: UTC-6 (Central (CST))
  - Summer (DST): UTC-5 (CDT)
- GNIS feature ID: 507392

Amandaville is an unincorporated community in Cumberland County, Kentucky, United States.

== Geography ==
The community lies along Route 704 north-northeast of the city of Burkesville, the county seat of Cumberland County. Its elevation is 600 feet (183 m).
