= Bronston, Kentucky =

Unincorporated community in Kentucky, United States

- Unincorporated community
- Location within Kentucky
- Coordinates: 36°59′08″N 84°37′23″W
- Country: United States
- State: Kentucky
- County: Pulaski
- Elevation: 823 ft (251 m)
- Time zone: UTC-5 (Eastern (EST))
  - Summer (DST): UTC-4 (EDT)
- ZIP code: 42518
- Area code: 606
- GNIS feature ID: 510939

Bronston is an unincorporated community in Pulaski County, Kentucky, United States. Bronston is located on Lake Cumberland along Kentucky Route 90, 7.5 miles (12.1 km) south of Somerset. Bronston has a post office with ZIP code 42518.
