= Marrowbone, Cumberland County, Kentucky =

Marrowbone, Kentucky
- Census-designated place
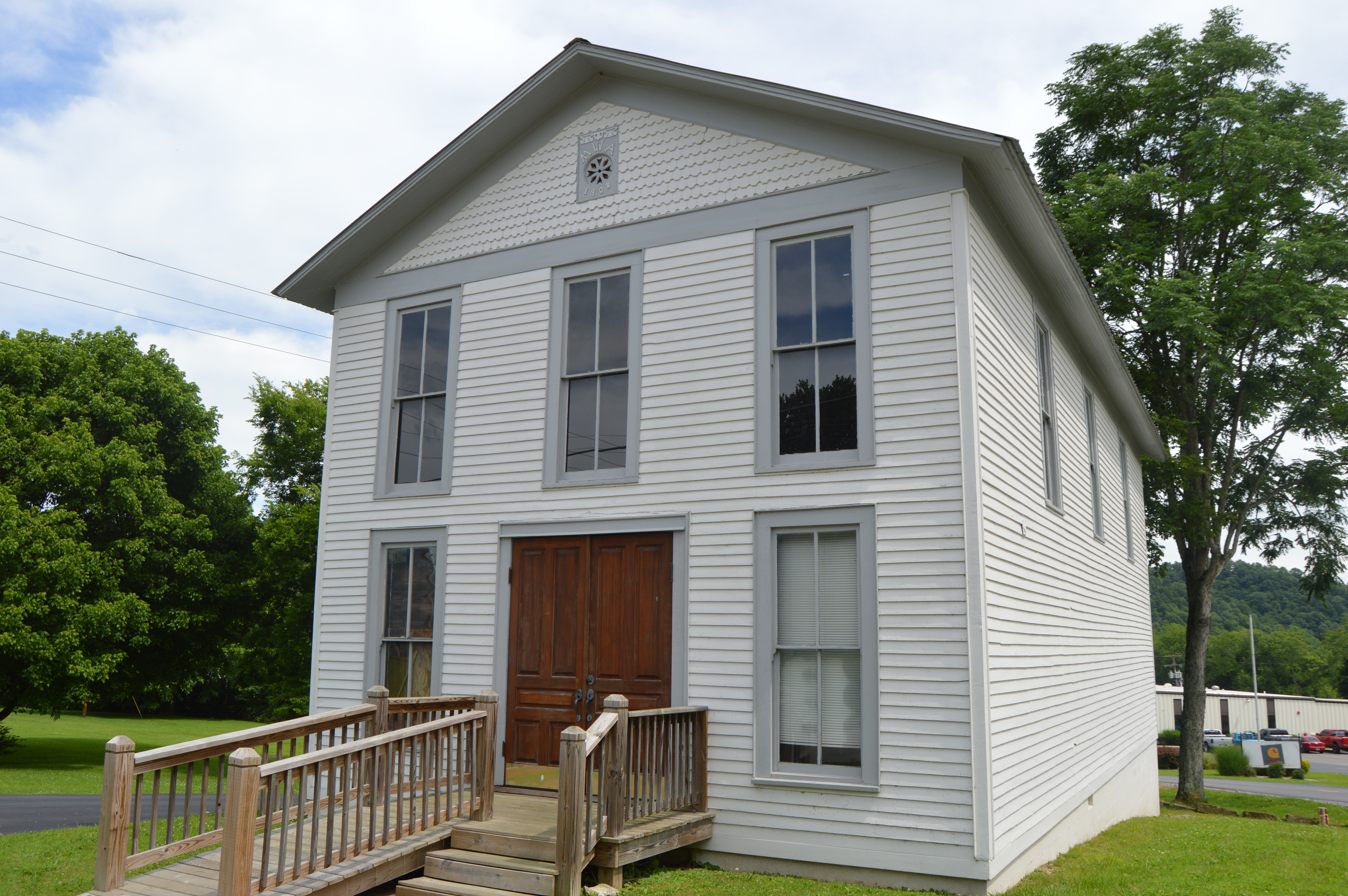
- Modern Woodmen lodge building on Kentucky Route 90

- Location within the state of Kentucky Marrowbone (the United States)
- Coordinates: 36°49′39″N 85°30′24″W
- Country: United States
- State: Kentucky
- County: Cumberland

Area
  - Total: 1.29 sq mi (3.34 km^{2})
  - Land: 1.27 sq mi (3.30 km^{2})
  - Water: 0.015 sq mi (0.04 km^{2})
- Elevation: 643 ft (196 m)

Population (2020)
  - Total: 147
  - Density: 115.4/sq mi (44.54/km^{2})
- Time zone: UTC-6 (Central (CST))
  - Summer (DST): UTC-5 (CDT)
- ZIP codes: 42759
- Area code(s): 270 and 364
- FIPS code: 21-50124
- GNIS feature ID: 497558

Marrowbone is a census-designated place in Cumberland County, Kentucky, United States. As of the 2010 census, it had a population of 217.

The Marrowbone Historic District, which includes three properties, is listed on the National Register of Historic Places.

== History ==
In 1863 and early 1864, during the American Civil War, the area served as a hospital camp that served both the Union and Confederate armies.

== Geography ==
It lies along Kentucky Route 90 about 10 miles (16 km) west-northwest of the city of Burkesville, the county seat of Cumberland County; it's junction with KY 496, which connects the area to Edmonton, is just east of the community. Its elevation is 643 feet (196 m), and it is located at about (36.8288889, -85.5030556).

== Post office ==
The community has a post office, with the ZIP code of 42759.

== Demographics ==
Historical population
Census	Pop.	Note	%±
2010	217		—
2020	147		−32.3%
U.S. Decennial Census

Marrowbone first appeared as a census designated place in the 2010 U.S. census.

=== 2020 census ===
Marrowbone CDP, Kentucky – Racial and ethnic composition Note: the US Census treats Hispanic/Latino as an ethnic category. This table excludes Latinos from the racial categories and assigns them to a separate category. Hispanics/Latinos may be of any race.
Race / Ethnicity (NH = Non-Hispanic)	Pop 2010	Pop 2020	% 2010	% 2020
White alone (NH)	208	135	95.85%	91.84%
Black or African American alone (NH)	3	3	1.38%	2.04%
Native American or Alaska Native alone (NH)	1	0	0.46%	0.00%
Asian alone (NH)	0	0	0.00%	0.00%
Native Hawaiian or Pacific Islander alone (NH)	0	0	0.00%	0.00%
Other race alone (NH)	0	0	0.00%	0.00%
Mixed race or Multiracial (NH)	5	5	2.30%	3.40%
Hispanic or Latino (any race)	0	4	0.00%	2.72%
Total	217	147	100.00%	100.00%
