= Dale Hollow Lake State Park =

State park in Kentucky, United States

Dale Hollow Lake State Resort Park
- Location within Kentucky Location within the United States
- Interactive map of Dale Hollow Lake State Resort Park
- Type: Kentucky state park
- Location: Clinton and Cumberland counties, Kentucky, United States
- Coordinates: 36°38′41″N 85°17′46″W
- Area: 3,398 acres (1,375 ha)
- Elevation: 1,024 ft (312 m)
- Established: 1978
- Administrator: Kentucky Department of Parks
- Website: Official website

Dale Hollow Lake State Resort Park is a Kentucky state park located on the Frogue Peninsula on the northern shore of Dale Hollow Reservoir in Clinton and Cumberland counties. The park comprises 3,400 acres (1,400 ha), the lake 27,600 acres (11,200 ha).
