= Midway, Clay County, Tennessee =

Midway
- Unincorporated community
- Location within Tennessee Location within the United States
- Coordinates: 36°33′13″N 85°36′33″W
- Country: United States
- State: Tennessee
- County: Clay
- Elevation: 925 ft (282 m)
- Time zone: UTC-6 (Central (CST))
  - Summer (DST): UTC-5 (CDT)
- Area code: 931
- GNIS feature ID: 1293728

Midway is an unincorporated community in Clay County, Tennessee.

== Geography ==
Midway is 5.8 miles (9.3 km) west of Celina.
