= Bakerton, Kentucky =

Unincorporated community in Kentucky, United States

Bakerton
- Unincorporated community
- Location within the state of Kentucky Bakerton (the United States)
- Coordinates: 36°50′54″N 85°20′1″W
- Country: United States
- State: Kentucky
- County: Cumberland
- Elevation: 600 ft (180 m)
- Time zone: UTC-6 (Central (CST))
  - Summer (DST): UTC-5 (CDT)
- GNIS feature ID: 507440

Bakerton is an unincorporated community in Cumberland County, Kentucky, United States.

== Geography ==
The community lies near Route 704 northeast of the city of Burkesville, the county seat of Cumberland County. Its elevation is 600 feet (183 m).
