= Marrowbone Historic District =

Historic district in Kentucky, United States

- U.S. National Register of Historic Places
- U.S. Historic district
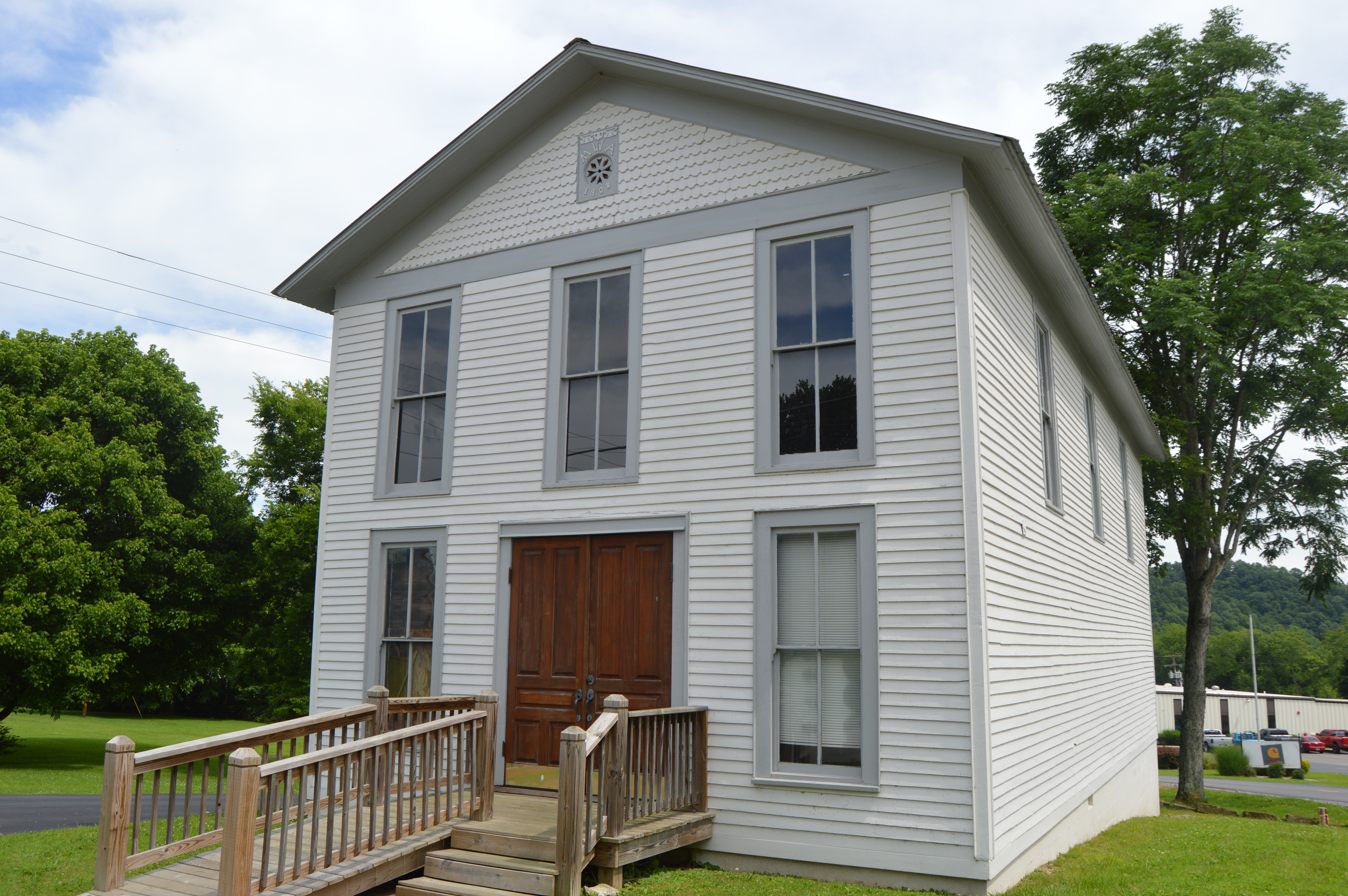
- Modern Woodmen lodge in Marrowbone
- Location: Kentucky Route 90, Marrowbone, Kentucky
- Coordinates: 36°49′42″N 85°30′11″W
- Area: 1.7 acres (0.69 ha)
- Built: 1865
- Built by: John Wesley Williams
- Architectural style: Gothic Revival
- NRHP reference No.: 83004048
- Added to NRHP: July 28, 1983

The Marrowbone Historic District is a 1.7-acre (0.69 ha) historic district in Marrowbone, Cumberland County, Kentucky which was listed on the National Register of Historic Places in 1983. It included three contributing buildings.

It includes the Marrowbone Presbyterian Church, the Modern Woodmen of America Hall, and the William Barton House (with a small smokehouse behind). The church and probably also the Woodmen Hall were built by local contractor John Wesley Williams.
