= Waterview, Kentucky =

Unincorporated community in Kentucky, United States

Waterview
- Unincorporated community
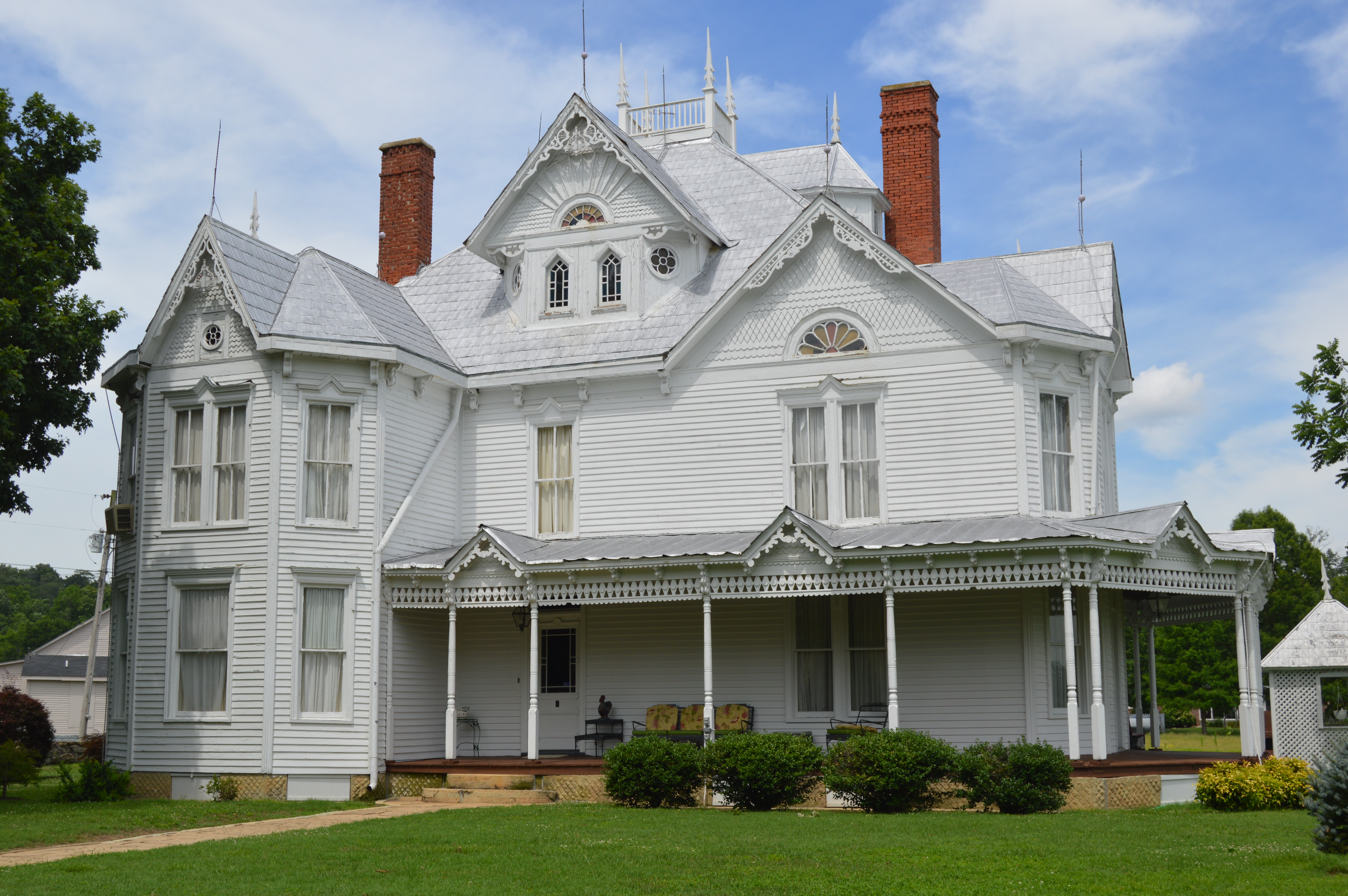
- Elaborate Queen Anne house

- Location within the state of Kentucky Waterview (the United States)
- Coordinates: 36°49′1″N 85°27′30″W
- Country: United States
- State: Kentucky
- County: Cumberland
- Elevation: 571 ft (174 m)
- Time zone: UTC-6 (Central (CST))
  - Summer (DST): UTC-5 (CDT)
- GNIS feature ID: 506269

Waterview is an unincorporated community in Cumberland County, Kentucky, United States.

== Geography ==
The community is located along Route 90 at its junction with Route 100, about 6 miles (9.7 km) west-northwest of the city of Burkesville, the county seat of Cumberland County. Its elevation is 571 feet (174 m).
