= Parkers Lake, Kentucky =

Unincorporated community in Kentucky, United States

- Unincorporated community
- Location within Kentucky Location within the United States
- Coordinates: 36°50′31″N 84°28′51″W
- Country: United States
- State: Kentucky
- County: McCreary
- Elevation: 1,266 ft (386 m)
- Time zone: UTC-5 (Eastern (EST))
  - Summer (DST): UTC-4 (EDT)
- ZIP codes: 42634
- GNIS feature ID: 514437

Parkers Lake is an unincorporated community within McCreary County, Kentucky, United States.
