= Bakerton, West Virginia =

Unincorporated community in West Virginia, United States

- Unincorporated community
- Location within West Virginia Location within the United States
- Coordinates: 39°21′46″N 77°45′47″W
- Country: United States
- State: West Virginia
- County: Jefferson
- Time zone: UTC-5 (Eastern (EST))
  - Summer (DST): UTC-4 (EDT)
- ZIP code: 25410
- GNIS feature ID: 1553781

Bakerton is an unincorporated community in Jefferson County, West Virginia, United States.
