= Eighty Eight, Kentucky =

Unincorporated community in Kentucky, United States

Eighty Eight
- Unincorporated community
- Location within the state of Kentucky Eighty Eight (the United States)
- Coordinates: 36°55′6″N 85°47′11″W
- Country: United States
- State: Kentucky
- County: Barren
- Elevation: 810 ft (250 m)
- Time zone: UTC-6 (Central (CST))
  - Summer (DST): UTC-5 (CST)
- ZIP codes: 42130
- Area codes: 270 and 364
- GNIS feature ID: 491598

Eighty Eight is an unincorporated community in Barren County, Kentucky, United States. It is part of the Glasgow Micropolitan Statistical Area and is 10 miles east of Glasgow on State Highway 90. The community held celebrations on August 8, 1988 (08/08/88) and August 8, 2008 (08/08/08).

== Name and culture ==
As reported in an article in The New York Times, the community was named in 1860 by Dabnie Nunnally, the community's first postmaster. He had little faith in the legibility of his handwriting, and thought that using numbers would solve the problem. He then reached into his pocket and came up with 88 cents. Another explanation is that the hamlet is 8.8 miles from Glasgow. In the 1948 U.S. presidential election, Eighty Eight cast 88 votes for Dewey and 88 votes for Truman.

The sole store in the community was founded by the Richardson Brothers, and was the main source for feed, grocery, hardware and farm needs. It was closed in the late 1980s. The building was restored in 2005 and reopened as the Eighty Eight General Store. The historic post office (Zip Code 42130) was kept intact and is now open to the public. It is no longer in service however and was discontinued in 1984.

Eighty Eight is home to a congregation of the Church of Christ. Although sometimes mistakenly called Eighty Eight Church of Christ, the proper name is Refuge Church of Christ.

== 1988 celebration ==
In early January 1988, the Eighty Eight postmistress received a note that said, "This is your year." She became "the darling of stamp collectors across the world" who wanted mail that had been stamped with her Eighty Eight postmark in 1988, particularly on August 8 (8-8-88). Mail poured in throughout 1988, including 200 graduation notices from the class of '88 at the University of Southern California. On August 8, 2008, 26,000 pieces of mail were stamped with the help of a mobile post office that was sent in from Louisville. The mobile post office commemorated the occasion with philatelic merchandise, including shirts and visors with the Eighty Eight postmark.

Eighty Eight resident Rosemary McPherson, owner of the 88 Market, organized The 88 Celebration on August 7 and 8 to commemorate the date 8-8-88. Thousands of visitors attended the festivities, which included a parade led an 88-year-old grandmaster and an 8-foot-8-inch-long cake. The 88 Market sold 88 cent hamburgers and custom printed Eighty Eight baseball caps and T-shirts, the first of which was ceremoniously presented to Eighty Eight's 88-year-old resident, Elsie Billingsley. A reunion was held for alumni of the defunct Eighty Eight School, which had gone up to grade eight, and 88-year-olds received a special invitation. The most anticipated event was the wedding of a Wyoming couple that thought it would "be fun" to get married at 8:08pm on 8-8-88 in Eighty Eight, Kentucky. Good Morning America broadcast from Eighty Eight.

The community's two-lane road had bumper to bumper traffic. A custodian of Northern Illinois University named Pearl Russie drove to Eighty Eight in her Oldsmobile Delta 88, which she had outfitted with an "ANY 88" license plate. "I'm an 88 freak", she said. "When I heard there was a town called Eighty Eight, I had to come here".

"It's all to mark the odd convergence of a point in time and a pinpoint on the map", wrote the Associated Press.

In 2023, Tracey Harder wrote a children's book inspired by her childhood memories of the day.

== See also ==
- List of places with numeric names
