= Glasgow Municipal Airport =

- IATA: GLW; ICAO: KGLW; FAA LID: GLW

Summary
- Airport type: Public
- Owner: Glasgow Airport Board
- Serves: Glasgow, Kentucky
- Elevation AMSL: 716 ft (218 m)
- Coordinates: 37°01′54″N 085°57′14″W
- Interactive map of Glasgow Municipal Airport

Runways
Direction	Length		Surface
Direction	ft	m	Surface
8/26	5,301	1,616	Asphalt

Statistics (2006)
- Aircraft operations: 13,350
- Based aircraft: 30
- Source: Federal Aviation Administration

Glasgow Municipal Airport (IATA: GLW, ICAO: KGLW, FAA LID: GLW) is a public use airport located two nautical miles (3.7 km) northwest of the central business district of Glasgow, a city in Barren County, Kentucky, United States. It is owned by the Glasgow Airport Board.

== Facilities and aircraft ==
Glasgow Municipal Airport covers an area of 192 acres (78 ha) at an elevation of 716 feet (218 m) above mean sea level. It has one asphalt paved runway designated 8/26 which measures 5,301 by 100 feet (1,616 x 30 m).

For the 12-month period ending February 8, 2006, the airport had 13,350 aircraft operations, an average of 36 per day: 85% general aviation, 13% air taxi and 1% military. At that time there were 30 aircraft based at this airport: 77% single-engine, 17% multi-engine, 3% jet and 3% helicopter.

== See also ==
- List of airports in Kentucky
