= Bakerton, Tennessee =

Unincorporated community in Tennessee, US

Coordinates: 36°30′46″N 85°48′17″W

Bakerton is an unincorporated community in Clay County, Tennessee, in the United States.

== History ==
A post office was established at Bakerton in 1904, and it closed in 1907. John Baker served as postmaster there, and likely gave the community its name.

== Geography ==
The community is located in the southwestern corner of Clay County along Tennessee State Route 151, near the tripoint of Clay, Macon and Jackson Counties, connecting the area with Red Boiling Springs to the northwest.
