= Tim Lee Carter =

American politician (1910–1987)

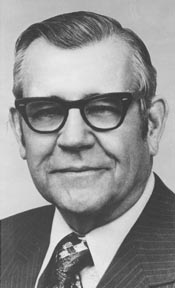

Member of the U.S. House of Representatives from Kentucky's 5th district
- In office January 3, 1965 – January 3, 1981
- Preceded by: Eugene Siler
- Succeeded by: Hal Rogers

Personal details
- Born: September 2, 1910 Tompkinsville, Kentucky, U.S.
- Died: March 27, 1987 (aged 76) Glasgow, Kentucky, U.S.
- Resting place: Oak Hill Cemetery; Tompkinsville, Kentucky, U.S.
- Party: Republican
- Education: Western Kentucky State College; University of Tennessee

Tim Lee Carter (September 2, 1910 – March 27, 1987) was an American politician serving as a Republican member of the United States House of Representatives for the Commonwealth of Kentucky from 1965 until 1981.

== Background ==
Congressman Carter was born in Tompkinsville, Kentucky. He attended Western Kentucky State College (now Western Kentucky University) in Bowling Green, having pursued a pre-med curricula. Carter went on to earn his medical degree from the University of Tennessee in 1937. He served in the United States Army Medical Corps in World War II, traveling with the Thirty-Eighth Infantry for over three and a half years. He became a captain. Later Carter returned to practice medicine in Tompkinsville.

== Election ==
In 1964, Carter sought the Republican nomination for Congress, following the retirement of Representative Eugene Siler. Carter won the election over Democrat Frances Jones Mills, becoming one of the few bright spots in a disastrous year for the GOP. However, he represented one of the few ancestrally Republican districts south of the Ohio River. Voters in this region identified with the Republicans after the Civil War, and have remained a consistent voting bloc since. Carter kept this tradition going, and was reelected seven times with no substantive opposition.

== Vietnam war ==
In 1966, Carter was sent by President Johnson to Vietnam along with ten other war-veteran congressmen on a "Speaker's Committee." Upon his return, he was asked by Johnson about his opinion of the state of the war. Carter went against the nine other delegates, stating: "No, Mr. President, you are not winning the war,". Carter later came to be known as the first Republican Congressman to call for the end of the Vietnam War. Rising before the U.S. House of Representatives on August 28, 1967, Carter stated "Let us now, while we are yet strong, bring our men home, every man jack of them. The Vietcong fight fiercely and tenaciously because it is their land and we are foreigners intervening in their civil war. If we must fight, let us fight in defense of our homeland and our own hemisphere."

== Policies ==
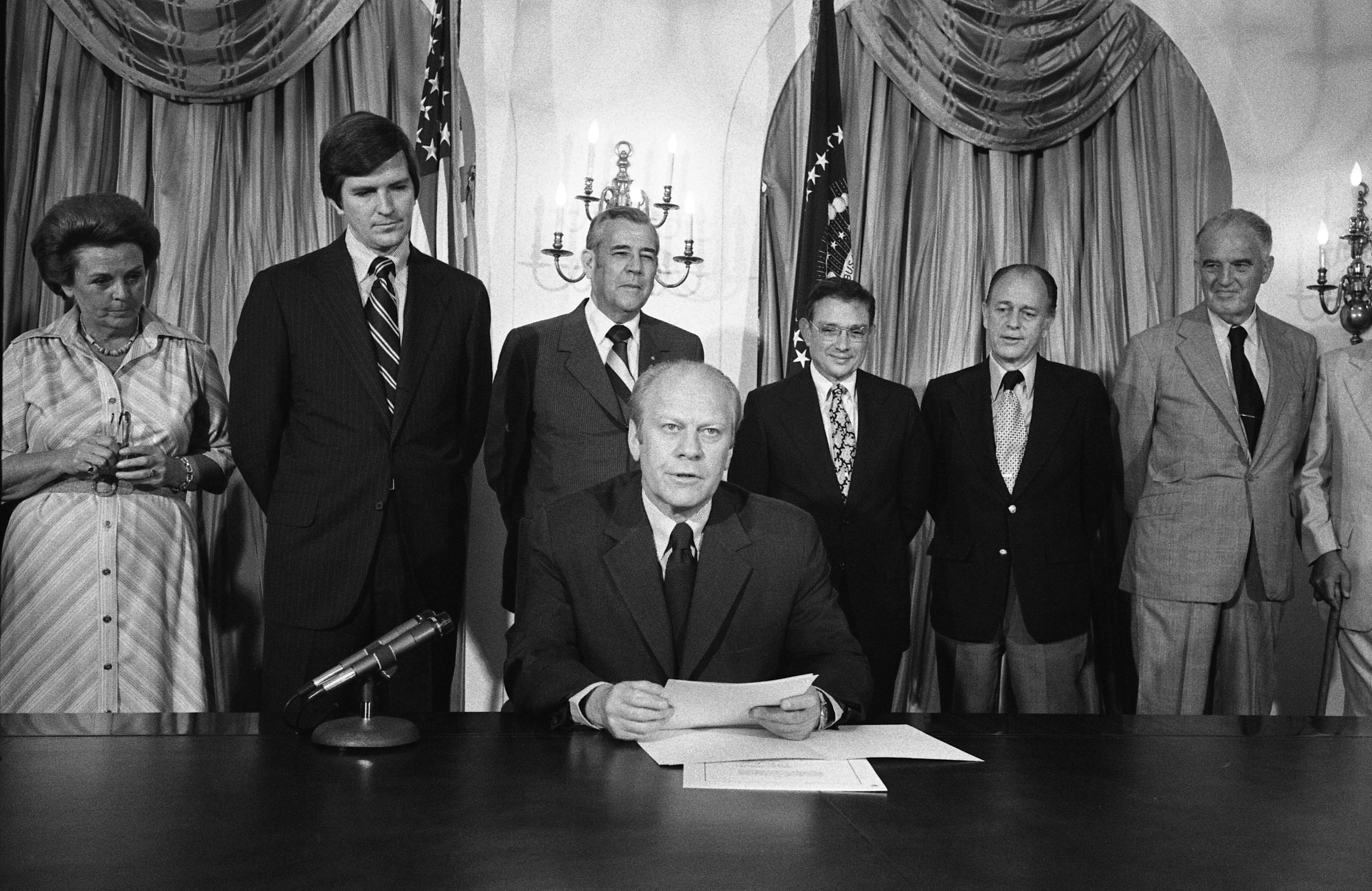
President Gerald Ford prior to signing S.3735, authorizing the 1976 National Swine Flu Immunization Program. Also shown are [l-r]: Department of Health, Education and Welfare (HEW) Undersecretary Marjorie Lynch, HEW Secretary F. David Mathews, U.S. Rep. Tim Lee Carter (R-KY), Assistant Secretary for Health (HEW) Dr. Theodore Cooper, HEW General Counsel William Howard Taft IV, and HEW Assistant General Counsel Bernard Feiner.

Carter was considered as a moderate-progressive Republican in Washington. Carter voted in favor of the Voting Rights Act of 1965 and the Civil Rights Act of 1968. In 1971, Carter was the sole Republican in the state's congressional delegation to vote for the Equal Employment Opportunity Act. As reported in a 1977 issue of Time magazine, Carter put forth the first Republican plan for national health insurance. Carter was appointed by President Nixon to the Shafer Commission, charged with making policy recommendations concerning drug abuse. The Shafer Commission recommended decriminalizing simple marijuana possession, a policy that President Nixon flatly refused.

== Family ==
Tim Lee Carter's sister, Pearl Carter Pace was one of the earliest women elected as sheriff in Kentucky. Pearl's and Tim Lee's father, James C. Carter Sr., served for 48 years as Circuit Judge in four counties of South Central Kentucky. His son, James C. Carter Jr., served for 46 years as judge following his father. Numerous other Carters have served in a wide range of public offices, both elective and appointive.

Pearl's son, Stanley Carter Pace, was captured as a prisoner of war by the German Army during World War II. He later rose to the Chairmanship of TRW, and, came out of retirement to return the giant defense contractor General Dynamics to viability. The extended Carter family is still active in state and local politics in Monroe County, Kentucky.

== Retirement ==
In 1980, Carter did not seek re-election. On his retirement, he returned to live in Tompkinsville, Kentucky, and remained active in local, state, and national politics until his death in 1987.

U.S. House of Representatives
Preceded by Eugene Siler	Member of the U.S. House of Representatives from Kentucky's 5th congressional district 1965–1981	Succeeded by Hal Rogers
