= Cumberland County, Kentucky =

County in Kentucky, United States

- County
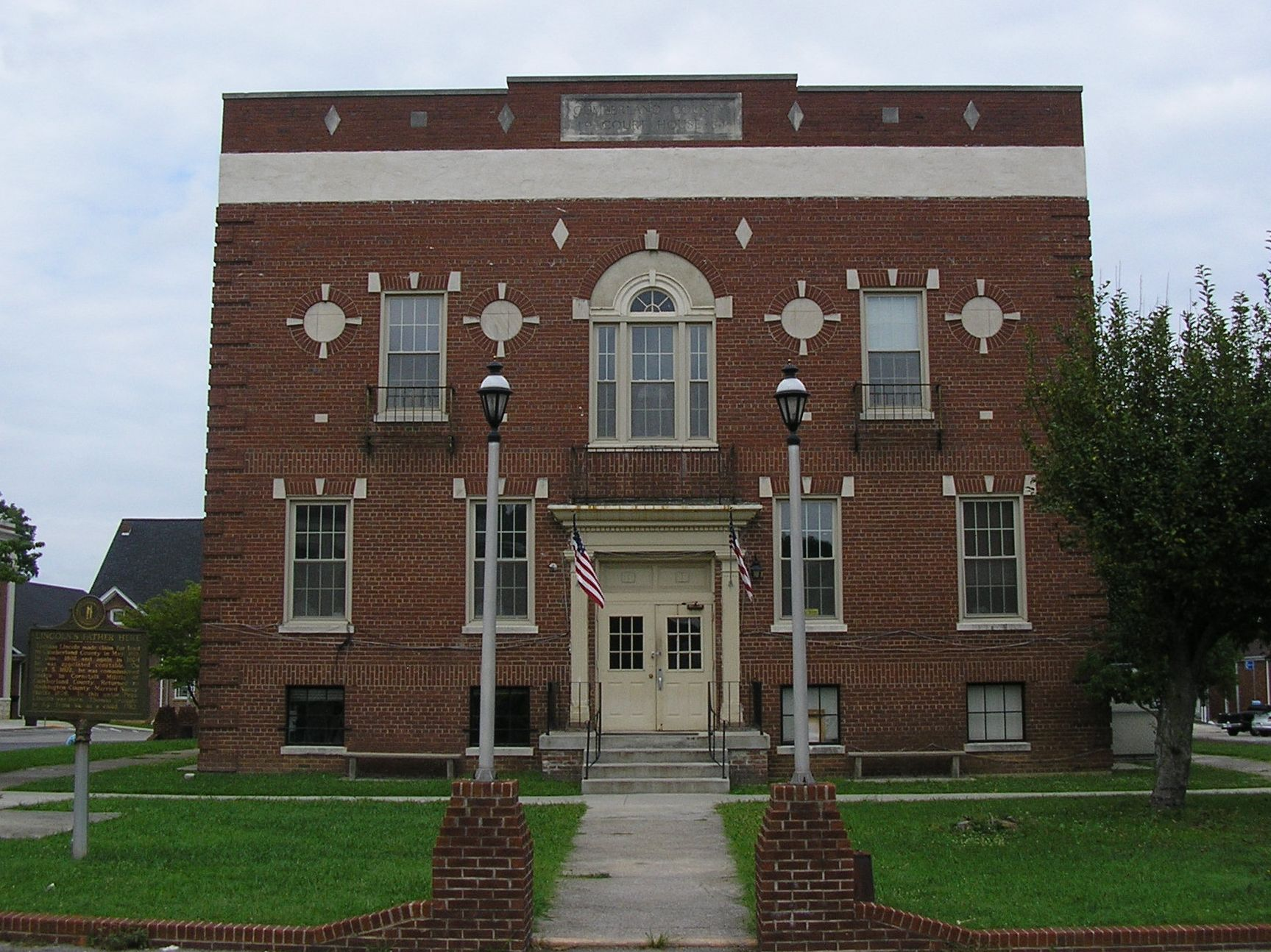
- Cumberland County courthouse in Burkesville

- Location within the U.S. state of Kentucky
- Coordinates: 36°47′N 85°23′W
- Country: United States
- State: Kentucky
- Founded: 1798
- Named for: Cumberland River
- Seat: Burkesville
- Largest city: Burkesville

Government
  - Judge/Executive: Luke King (R)

Area
  - Total: 311 sq mi (810 km^{2})
  - Land: 305 sq mi (790 km^{2})
  - Water: 5.7 sq mi (15 km^{2}) 1.8%

Population (2020)
  - Total: 5,888
  - Estimate (2025): 5,992 ▲
  - Density: 19.3/sq mi (7.45/km^{2})
- Time zone: UTC−6 (Central)
  - Summer (DST): UTC−5 (CDT)
- Congressional district: 1st
- Website: explorecumberlandcounty.com

Cumberland County is a county located in the Pennyroyal Plateau region of the U.S. state of Kentucky. As of the 2020 census, the population was 5,888. Its county seat is Burkesville. The county was formed in 1798 and named for the Cumberland River, which in turn may have been named after the Duke of Cumberland or the English county of Cumberland.

== History ==
Cumberland County was created in 1798 from land given by Green County. In 1829, the first commercial oil well in the United States was dug three miles north of Burkesville. It is usually not recognized as a commercial well because the drillers were looking for salt brine, but the oil was bottled and sold.

It was the first county in the United States to elect a female sheriff, Pearl Carter Pace.

Burkesville is the first town downstream from Wolf Creek Dam, so it is considered flood-proof, but there have been concerns about leaks at the dam. The U.S. Army Corps of Engineers completed repairs in 2013.

== Geography ==
According to the U.S. Census Bureau, the county has a total area of 311 square miles (810 km^{2}), of which 305 square miles (790 km^{2}) is land and 5.7 square miles (15 km^{2}) (1.8%) is water. Major waterways include the Cumberland River and a small branch of Dale Hollow Lake which covers the southern end of the county.

=== Adjacent counties ===
- Adair County (north)
- Russell County (northeast)
- Clinton County (east)
- Clay County, Tennessee (south)
- Monroe County (west)
- Metcalfe County (northwest)

== Demographics ==
Historical population
Census	Pop.	Note	%±
1800	3,284		—
1810	6,191		88.5%
1820	8,058		30.2%
1830	8,624		7.0%
1840	6,090		−29.4%
1850	7,005		15.0%
1860	7,340		4.8%
1870	7,690		4.8%
1880	8,894		15.7%
1890	8,452		−5.0%
1900	8,962		6.0%
1910	9,846		9.9%
1920	10,648		8.1%
1930	10,204		−4.2%
1940	11,923		16.8%
1950	9,309		−21.9%
1960	7,835		−15.8%
1970	6,850		−12.6%
1980	7,289		6.4%
1990	6,784		−6.9%
2000	7,147		5.4%
2010	6,856		−4.1%
2020	5,888		−14.1%
2025 (est.)	5,992	▲	1.8%
U.S. Decennial Census; 1790-1960 1900-1990; 1990-2000 2010-2021

=== 2020 census ===
As of the 2020 census, the county had a population of 5,888. The median age was 47.8 years. 21.0% of residents were under the age of 18 and 23.9% of residents were 65 years of age or older. For every 100 females there were 97.0 males, and for every 100 females age 18 and over there were 94.8 males age 18 and over.

The racial makeup of the county was 92.8% White, 2.5% Black or African American, 0.1% American Indian and Alaska Native, 0.1% Asian, 0.1% Native Hawaiian and Pacific Islander, 0.6% from some other race, and 3.8% from two or more races. Hispanic or Latino residents of any race comprised 1.3% of the population.

0.0% of residents lived in urban areas, while 100.0% lived in rural areas.

There were 2,585 households in the county, of which 25.4% had children under the age of 18 living with them and 26.8% had a female householder with no spouse or partner present. About 34.3% of all households were made up of individuals and 17.1% had someone living alone who was 65 years of age or older.

There were 3,379 housing units, of which 23.5% were vacant. Among occupied housing units, 74.3% were owner-occupied and 25.7% were renter-occupied. The homeowner vacancy rate was 2.6% and the rental vacancy rate was 5.5%.

=== 2000 census ===
As of the census of 2000, there were 7,147 people, 2,976 households, and 2,038 families residing in the county. The population density was 23 per square mile (8.9/km^{2}). There were 3,567 housing units at an average density of 12 per square mile (4.6/km^{2}). The racial makeup of the county was 95.28% White, 3.41% Black or African American, 0.14% Native American, 0.04% Asian, 0.06% Pacific Islander, 0.15% from other races, and 0.91% from two or more races. 0.60% of the population were Hispanic or Latino of any race.

There were 2,976 households, out of which 29.40% had children under the age of 18 living with them, 53.00% were married couples living together, 11.20% had a female householder with no husband present, and 31.50% were non-families. 28.90% of all households were made up of individuals, and 14.50% had someone living alone who was 65 years of age or older. The average household size was 2.37 and the average family size was 2.89.

In the county, the population was spread out, with 23.60% under the age of 18, 6.90% from 18 to 24, 26.80% from 25 to 44, 24.80% from 45 to 64, and 17.90% who were 65 years of age or older. The median age was 40 years. For every 100 females there were 92.70 males. For every 100 females age 18 and over, there were 89.10 males.

The median income for a household in the county was $21,572, and the median income for a family was $28,701. Males had a median income of $21,313 versus $16,548 for females. The per capita income for the county was $12,643. About 16.40% of families and 23.80% of the population were below the poverty line, including 30.30% of those under age 18 and 33.00% of those age 65 or over.

=== Ancestry/ethnicity ===
As of 2017 the largest self-identified ancestry groups/ethnic groups in Cumberland County, Kentucky were:

Largest ancestries (2017)	Percent
English	32.8%
American	15.7%
Irish	10.2%
German	4.4%
Scots-Irish	1.1%
Italian	1.1%
Scottish	1.1%
French (except Basque)	1.0%
Polish	0.9%

== Communities ==
=== City ===
- Burkesville (county seat)

=== Census-designated place ===
- Marrowbone

=== Other unincorporated places ===
- Amandaville
- Bakerton
- Bow
- Dubre
- Green Grove
- Grider
- Judio
- Kettle
- Modoc
- Peytonsburg
- Waterview

== Politics ==
United States presidential election results for Cumberland County, Kentucky
Year	Republican		Democratic		Third party(ies)	
Year	No.	%	No.	%	No.	%
1912	972	56.91%	577	33.78%	159	9.31%
1916	1,394	67.60%	653	31.67%	15	0.73%
1920	2,380	71.60%	931	28.01%	13	0.39%
1924	2,143	69.60%	918	29.81%	18	0.58%
1928	2,593	82.79%	538	17.18%	1	0.03%
1932	2,369	65.53%	1,235	34.16%	11	0.30%
1936	2,127	69.40%	935	30.51%	3	0.10%
1940	2,533	74.30%	872	25.58%	4	0.12%
1944	2,619	78.27%	717	21.43%	10	0.30%
1948	1,947	69.31%	794	28.27%	68	2.42%
1952	2,426	72.44%	909	27.14%	14	0.42%
1956	2,584	71.76%	1,000	27.77%	17	0.47%
1960	2,697	76.25%	840	23.75%	0	0.00%
1964	1,794	56.70%	1,348	42.60%	22	0.70%
1968	2,116	67.82%	646	20.71%	358	11.47%
1972	2,294	76.42%	686	22.85%	22	0.73%
1976	1,653	65.41%	853	33.76%	21	0.83%
1980	2,216	71.92%	821	26.65%	44	1.43%
1984	2,729	77.77%	766	21.83%	14	0.40%
1988	2,231	74.49%	753	25.14%	11	0.37%
1992	1,866	60.96%	917	29.96%	278	9.08%
1996	1,654	62.13%	753	28.29%	255	9.58%
2000	2,220	73.85%	736	24.48%	50	1.66%
2004	2,356	72.74%	848	26.18%	35	1.08%
2008	2,056	73.51%	697	24.92%	44	1.57%
2012	2,216	77.65%	599	20.99%	39	1.37%
2016	2,502	81.60%	459	14.97%	105	3.42%
2020	2,769	83.68%	508	15.35%	32	0.97%
2024	2,922	84.89%	483	14.03%	37	1.07%

Like all of the heavily Unionist eastern Pennyroyal, a region of largely small farms that did not rely heavily on slavery, Cumberland County provided an exceptionally large number of soldiers for the Union Army during the Civil War. Reflecting that, the county became and has remained overwhelmingly Republican following the end of the Reconstruction Era. As of 2012, Cumberland County had the fewest registered Democrats, 844, out of all of Kentucky's counties.

The last Democrat to carry Cumberland County at the Presidential level was Horatio Seymour in 1868. Lyndon Johnson, in his 1964 landslide, is the only Democrat to receive 40% of the county's vote in a presidential election since 1896.

Cumberland County was a dry county prior to a special election held June 28, 2016, where the measure passed 1,441 votes to 1,069 votes.

=== Elected officials ===
Elected officials as of January 3, 2025
U.S. House	James Comer (R)	KY 1
Ky. Senate	Rick Girdler (R)	15
Ky. House	Amy Neighbors (R)	21

== Notable people ==
- William M. Branham, American Christian minister and faith healer who initiated the post–World War II healing revival.
- Joel Owsley Cheek, founder of Maxwell House.
- Edwin L. Norris, fifth Governor of Montana
- David L. Williams, Kentucky 40th Circuit Court judge, former President of the Kentucky Senate, 1992 United States Senate election candidate, and 2011 Kentucky gubernatorial election candidate.

== See also ==
- Morgan's Raid
- National Register of Historic Places listings in Cumberland County, Kentucky
- Cumberland River
- Dale Hollow Lake
