= List of radio stations in Kentucky =

The following is a list of FCC-licensed radio stations in the U.S. state of Kentucky, which can be sorted by their call signs, frequencies, cities of license, licensees, and programming formats.

== List of radio stations ==
Call sign	Frequency	City of license	Licensee	Format
KYAI	89.3 FM	McKee	Educational Media Foundation	Worship music (Air1)
WAAJ	90.5 FM	Benton	Pennyrile Christian Community, Inc.	Southern gospel
WAIN	1270 AM	Columbia	Tri-County Radio Broadcasting Corp.	Classic hits
WAIN-FM	93.5 FM	Columbia	Tri-County Radio Broadcasting Corp.	Country
WAKY	620 AM	Louisville	W & B Broadcasting Co., Inc.	Classic hits
WAKY-FM	103.5 FM	Radcliff	W & B Broadcasting Co., Inc.	Classic hits
WAMZ	97.5 FM	Louisville	iHM Licenses, LLC	Country
WANV	96.7 FM	Annville	F.T.G. Broadcasting, Inc.	Oldies
WANY-FM	100.9 FM	Albany	Pamela Allred DBA Albany Broadcasting Company	Country
WAPD	91.7 FM	Campbellsville	American Family Association	Inspirational (AFR)
WAXG	88.1 FM	Mount Sterling	American Family Association	Religious talk (AFR)
WAYD	88.1 FM	Auburn	Hope Media Group	Christian adult contemporary
WAYK	105.9 FM	Valley Station	Hope Media Group	Christian adult contemporary
WBCE	1200 AM	Wickliffe	Wendell D. Gray	Religious
WBFC	1470 AM	Stanton	Kentucky Mountain Bible College	Southern gospel
WBFI	91.5 FM	Mcdaniels	Bethel Fellowship, Inc.	Gospel
WBFK	91.1 FM	Hiseville	Bethel Fellowship, Inc.	Christian
WBFW	94.5 FM	Smith Mills	Music Ministries, Inc.	Christian
WBGN	102.3 FM	Munfordville	Newberry Broadcasting, Inc.	Adult hits
WBIO	94.7 FM	Philpot	Hancock Communications, Inc.	Country
WBKR	92.5 FM	Owensboro	Townsquare Media of Evansville/Owensboro, Inc.	Country
WBMK	88.5 FM	Morehead	American Family Association	Religious talk (AFR)
WBMP	570 AM	Paducah	Bristol Broadcasting Company, Inc.	Urban contemporary
WBRT	1320 AM	Bardstown	Bardstown Radio Team, LLC	Country
WBTF	107.9 FM	Midway	L.M. Communications of Kentucky, LLC	Urban contemporary
WBUL-FM	98.1 FM	Lexington	iHM Licenses, LLC	Country
WBVR	1340 AM	Bowling Green	Forever Communications, Inc.	Country
WBVR-FM	106.3 FM	Horse Cave	Forever Communications, Inc.	Country
WBVX	92.1 FM	Carlisle	L.M. Communications of Kentucky, LLC	Classic rock
WBZB	1130 AM	Murray	Forever Communications, Inc.	Top 40 (CHR)
WCBJ	103.7 FM	Campton	Morgan County Industries, Inc.	Adult contemporary
WCBL	1290 AM	Benton	Freeland Broadcasting Co, Inc.	Oldies
WCBL-FM	99.1 FM	Grand Rivers	Freeland Broadcasting Co, Inc.	Oldies
WCBR	1110 AM	Richmond	WCBR, Inc.	Religious
WCCK	95.7 FM	Calvert City	Freeland Broadcasting Co, Inc.	Classic country
WCDA	106.3 FM	Versailles	L.M. Communications, Inc	Adult top 40
WCDS	1230 AM	Glasgow	Newberry Broadcasting, Inc.	Sports (FSR)
WCGW	770 AM	Nicholasville	Christian Broadcasting System, Ltd.	Southern gospel/Christian talk
WCKQ	104.1 FM	Campbellsville	Tri-County Radio Broadcasting Corp.	Top 40 (CHR)
WCLU	1490 AM	Glasgow	Royse Radio, Inc.	Oldies
WCMI	1340 AM	Ashland	Fifth Avenue Broadcasting Company, Inc	Sports (ESPN)
WCMI-FM	92.7 FM	Catlettsburg	Fifth Avenue Broadcasting Company, Inc	Active rock
WCND	940 AM	Shelbyville	Pedro C. Arce	Regional Mexican
WCTT	680 AM	Corbin	Encore Communications, Inc	Adult standards
WCTT-FM	107.3 FM	Corbin	Encore Communications, Inc.	Top 40 (CHR)
WCVG	1320 AM	Covington	Reign Enterprizes, LLC	Gospel
WCVK	90.7 FM	Bowling Green	Christian Family Media Ministries, Inc.	Christian adult contemporary
WCVQ	107.9 FM	Fort Campbell	Saga Communications of Tuckessee, LLC	Hot adult contemporary
WCVX	1160 AM	Florence	Christian Broadcasting System, Ltd.	Christian
WCXE-LP	95.5 FM	Erlanger	SGM, Inc.	Classic rock
WCYN	1400 AM	Cynthiana	WCYN Broadcasting, Inc.	Classic hits
WCYO	100.7 FM	Irvine	Kentucky River Broadcasting Co., Inc	Country
WDCL-FM	89.7 FM	Somerset	Western Kentucky University	Public radio
WDDJ	96.9 FM	Paducah	Bristol Broadcasting Company, Inc.	Top 40 (CHR)
WDFB	1170 AM	Junction City	Alum Springs Vision & Outreach Corp	Religious
WDFB-FM	88.1 FM	Danville	Alum Springs Educational Corporation	Christian
WDGG	93.7 FM	Ashland	Fifth Avenue Broadcasting Company, Inc.	Country
WDHR	93.1 FM	Pikeville	Mountain Top Media LLC	Country
WDJX	99.7 FM	Louisville	Alpha Media Licensee LLC	Top 40 (CHR)
WDMZ-LP	92.7 FM	Benton	Falcon Communications Corp.	Variety
WDNS	93.3 FM	Bowling Green	Daily News Broadcasting Company	Classic rock
WDOC	1310 AM	Prestonsburg	WDOC, Inc.	Southern gospel
WDPJ-LP	93.5 FM	Danville	Iglesia Rosa de Saron	Spanish religious
WDXR	1450 AM	Paducah	Bristol Broadcasting Company, Inc.	Classic hits
WEBF	88.3 FM	Lerose	Hour of Harvest, Inc.	Christian adult contemporary (K-Love)
WEIM-LP	92.5 FM	West Liberty	Eagle Eye, Inc.	Christian
WEKB	1460 AM	Elkhorn City	Mountain Top Media LLC	Contemporary Christian
WEKC	88.5 FM	Corbin	Eastern Kentucky University	Public radio
WEKG	810 AM	Jackson	Intermountain Broadcasting Co., Inc.	Country
WEKH	90.9 FM	Hazard	Eastern Kentucky University	Public radio
WEKP	90.1 FM	Pineville	Eastern Kentucky University	Public radio
WEKT	1070 AM	Elkton	M & R Broadcasting, Inc.	Southern gospel
WEKU	88.9 FM	Richmond	Eastern Kentucky University	Public radio
WEKV	101.9 FM	Central City	Educational Media Foundation	Christian adult contemporary
WEKX	102.7 FM	Williamsburg	Whitley Broadcasting Co., Inc.	Classic rock
WEKY	1340 AM	Richmond	Wallingford Communications, LLC	Classic hits
WEUC	88.7 FM	Morganfield	Saint Ann Radio Group, Inc.	Catholic
WEZJ-FM	104.3 FM	Williamsburg	Whitley Broadcasting Co., Inc.	Country
WFBR-LP	95.3 FM	Mount Washington	First Baptist Church Mt Washington	Contemporary Christian
WFGS	103.7 FM	Murray	Forever Communications, Inc.	Country
WFIA	900 AM	Louisville	Word Broadcasting Network, Inc.	Christian/Talk
WFKN	1220 AM	Franklin	WFKN, LLC	Country
WFKY	104.9 FM	Frankfort	Southern Belle, LLC	Country
WFLE-FM	95.1 FM	Flemingsburg	Dreamcatcher Communications, Inc.	Country
WFLW	1360 AM	Monticello	Stephen W. Staples Jr.	Southern gospel
WFMP-LP	106.5 FM	Louisville	WFMP Low Power Radio Inc.	Variety
WFMW	730 AM	Madisonville	Sound Broadcasters, Inc.	Country
WFPK	91.9 FM	Louisville	Kentucky Public Radio, Inc.	Adult album alternative
WFPL	89.3 FM	Louisville	Kentucky Public Radio, Inc.	News/NPR
WFRT-FM	103.7 FM	Frankfort	Southern Belle, LLC	Classic hits
WFSR	970 AM	Harlan	Eastern Broadcasting Company	Southern gospel
WFTG	1400 AM	London	F.T.G. Broadcasting, Inc.	Country
WFTM	1240 AM	Maysville	Standard Tobacco Company, Inc.	Sports (ISN)
WFTM-FM	95.9 FM	Maysville	Standard Tobacco Company, Inc.	Soft adult contemporary
WFXY	1490 AM	Middlesboro	Penelope, Inc.	Classic rock
WGBF-FM	103.1 FM	Henderson	Townsquare Media of Evansville/Owensboro, Inc.	Mainstream rock
WGCF	89.3 FM	Paducah	American Family Association	Religious talk (AFR)
WGGC	95.1 FM	Bowling Green	Heritage Communications, Inc.	Country
WGHL	105.1 FM	Shepherdsville	Alpha Media Licensee LLC	Alternative rock
WGKS	96.9 FM	Paris	L.M. Communications, Inc.	Classic hits
WGKY	95.9 FM	Wickliffe	Withers Broadcasting Company of Paducah, LLC	Sports (FSR)
WGOH	1370 AM	Grayson	Carter County Broadcasting Co., Inc.	Classic country
WGRK-FM	105.7 FM	Greensburg	Tri-County Radio Broadcasting Corp.	Country
WGTK	970 AM	Louisville	Word Broadcasting Network, Inc.	Talk
WGWD-LP	98.3 FM	Paintsville	Paintsville Church of Christ	Christian
WHAS	840 AM	Louisville	iHM Licenses, LLC	News/Talk
WHAY	98.3 FM	Whitley City	Tim Lavender	Americana
WHBE	680 AM	Newburg	UB Louisville, LLC	Sports (ESPN)
WHBE-FM	105.7 FM	Eminence	UB Louisville, LLC	Sports (ESPN)
WHBN	1420 AM	Harrodsburg	Hometown Broadcasting of Harrodsburg Inc	Country
WHHT	103.7 FM	Cave City	Newberry Broadcasting, Inc.	Country
WHIR	1230 AM	Danville	Hometown Broadcasting of Danville Inc	News/Talk
WHKQ	92.3 FM	Louisa	Expression Production Group LLC	Christian adult contemporary (K-Love)
WHLN	1410 AM	Harlan	Eastern Broadcasting Company, Inc.	Adult contemporary
WHOP	1230 AM	Hopkinsville	Hop Broadcasting, Inc.	News/Talk
WHOP-FM	98.7 FM	Hopkinsville	Hop Broadcasting, Inc.	Adult contemporary
WHSX	99.1 FM	Edmonton	South 65 Communications, LLC	Country
WHVE	92.7 FM	Russell Springs	Shoreline Communications, Inc	Classic hits
WHVO	1480 AM	Hopkinsville	Ham Broadcasting Co., Inc.	Oldies
WIDS	570 AM	Russell Springs	Hammond Broadcasting, Inc.	Gospel
WIEL	1400 AM	Elizabethtown	Elizabethtown CBC, Inc.	Sports (ESPN)
WIFX-FM	94.3 FM	Jenkins	AJSPD, LLC	Hot adult contemporary
WIHE-LP	101.3 FM	Liberty	Liberty Public Radio, Inc.	Variety
WIJS-LP	94.3 FM	Somerset	Outreach for Jesus	Spanish religious
WIKI	95.3 FM	Carrollton	Wagon Wheel Broadcasting, LLC	Country
WIMM-LP	107.9 FM	Owensboro	Trinity Educational Radio Association	Catholic
WIMV	89.3 FM	Owingsville	Corban Broadcasting, Inc.	Christian
WIOK	107.5 FM	Falmouth	Hammond Broadcasting, Inc.	Gospel
WIOP-LP	106.3 FM	Shepherdsville	Lighthouse Baptist Church	Religious Teaching
WIRV	1550 AM	Irvine	Kentucky River Broadcasting Co., Inc	Oldies
WITB-LP	107.1 FM	Benton	Benton Church of Christ, Inc	Religious/Variety
WIVY	96.3 FM	Morehead	Gateway Radio Works, Inc.	Soft adult contemporary
WIZF	101.1 FM	Erlanger	Blue Chip Broadcasting Licenses, Ltd.	Mainstream urban
WJCR-FM	90.1 FM	Upton	FM 90.1, Inc.	Southern gospel
WJIE-FM	88.5 FM	Okolona	Evangel Schools, Inc.	Contemporary Christian
WJKY	1060 AM	Jamestown	Lake Cumberland Broadcasters	Country
WJMD	104.7 FM	Hazard	Hazard Broadcasting, Inc.	Gospel
WJMM-FM	99.1 FM	Keene	Christian Broadcasting System, Ltd.	Christian Teaching and Talk
WJOR-LP	95.5 FM	Whitesville	Passionist Nuns of Whitesville, KY., Inc.	Catholic
WJQQ	97.1 FM	Somerset	iHM Licenses, LLC	Classic rock
WJRS	104.9 FM	Jamestown	Lake Cumberland Broadcasters	Country
WJSN-FM	97.3 FM	Jackson	Intermountain Broadcasting Co.	Country
WJSO	90.1 FM	Pikeville	The Moody Bible Institute of Chicago	Religious
WJTE-LP	98.5 FM	East Berstadt	The Light of London	Southern gospel/Bluegrass
WJVK	91.7 FM	Owensboro	Christian Family Media Ministries, Inc.	Christian adult contemporary
WKAO	91.1 FM	Ashland	Positive Alternative Radio, Inc.	Christian adult contemporary
WKCA	97.7 FM	Salt Lick	Gateway Radio Works, Inc.	Country
WKCB	1340 AM	Hindman	Hindman Broadcasting Corporation	Religious
WKCB-FM	107.1 FM	Hindman	Hindman Broadcasting Corporation	Classic hits
WKCM	1160 AM	Hawesville	Hancock Communications, Inc.	Country
WKCT	930 AM	Bowling Green	Daily News Broadcasting Company	News/Talk
WKCX	89.1 FM	Crittenden	Somerset Educational Broadcasting Foundation	Christian
WKDO	1560 AM	Liberty	Shoreline Communications, Inc.	Country
WKDO-FM	98.7 FM	Liberty	Shoreline Communications, Inc.	Country
WKDP	1330 AM	Corbin	Eubanks Broadcasting, Inc.	Talk
WKDP-FM	99.5 FM	Corbin	Eubanks Broadcasting, Inc.	Country
WKDQ	99.5 FM	Henderson	Townsquare Media of Evansville/Owensboro, Inc.	Country
WKDZ	1110 AM	Cadiz	Ham Broadcasting Company, Inc.	Oldies
WKDZ-FM	106.5 FM	Cadiz	Ham Broadcasting Company, Inc.	Country
WKFC	101.9 FM	North Corbin	Radioactive, LLC	Country
WKHG	104.9 FM	Leitchfield	Heritage Media of Kentucky Inc	Hot adult contemporary
WKIC	1390 AM	Hazard	Mountain Broadcasting Service, Inc.	Top 40 (CHR)
WKJK	1080 AM	Louisville	iHM Licenses, LLC	News/Talk
WKKQ	96.1 FM	Barbourville	Choice Radio Corporation	Hot adult contemporary
WKKS	1570 AM	Vanceburg	Brown Communications, Inc.	Country
WKKS-FM	104.9 FM	Vanceburg	Brown Communications, Inc.	Adult contemporary
WKLB	1290 AM	Manchester	Sonshine Broadcasting Company, Ltd.	Rock & Country
WKLW-FM	94.7 FM	Paintsville	S.I.P. Broadcasting Company, Inc.	Top 40 (CHR)
WKLX	100.7 FM	Brownsville	Charles M. Anderson	Classic hits
WKMD	90.9 FM	Madisonville	Board of Regents, Murray State University	Public radio
WKMO-FM	101.5 FM	Vine Grove	Elizabethtown CBC, Inc.	Country
WKMS-FM	91.3 FM	Murray	Board of Regents, Murray State University	Public radio
WKMT	89.5 FM	Fulton	Board of Regents, Murray State University	Public radio
WKPB	89.5 FM	Henderson	Western Kentucky University	Public radio
WKQQ	100.1 FM	Winchester	iHM Licenses, LLC	Classic rock
WKRD	790 AM	Louisville	iHM Licenses, LLC	Sports (FSR)
WKRI-LP	95.9 FM	Richmond	RichmondRadio, Inc	Classic hits
WKSG	98.3 FM	Garrison	Strong Tower Christian Media	Southern gospel
WKTG	93.9 FM	Madisonville	Sound Broadcasters, Inc.	Classic rock
WKUE	90.9 FM	Elizabethtown	Western Kentucky University	Public radio
WKVN	95.3 FM	Morganfield	Educational Media Foundation	Christian adult contemporary (K-Love)
WKVO	89.9 FM	Georgetown	Educational Media Foundation	Christian adult contemporary (K-Love)
WKVY	88.1 FM	Somerset	Educational Media Foundation	Christian adult contemporary (K-Love)
WKWC	90.3 FM	Owensboro	Kentucky Wesleyan College	Adult album alternative
WKXO	1500 AM	Berea	Wallingford Communications, LLC	News/Talk
WKYA	105.5 FM	Greenville	Radio Active Media	Oldies
WKYB	107.5 FM	Perryville	Lincoln-Garrard Broadcasting Co., Inc.	Country
WKYF	92.1 FM	Fredonia	Educational Media Foundation	Christian adult contemporary (K-Love)
WKYG	89.1 FM	Murray	Madisonville Baptist Temple	Christian
WKYH	600 AM	Paintsville	S.I.P. Broadcasting Company, Inc.	Classic hits
WKYL	102.1 FM	Lawrenceburg	Southern Belle, LLC	Classic hits
WKYM	101.7 FM	Monticello	Stephen W. Staples Jr.	Classic rock
WKYN	107.7 FM	Mount Sterling	Gateway Radio Works, Inc.	Classic country
WKYP	90.1 FM	Ledbetter	Educational Media Foundation	Christian adult contemporary (K-Love)
WKYQ	93.3 FM	Paducah	Bristol Broadcasting Company, Inc.	Country
WKYR-FM	107.9 FM	Burkesville	River Country Communications, LLC	Country
WKYU-FM	88.9 FM	Bowling Green	Western Kentucky University	Public radio
WKYW	1490 AM	Frankfort	Southern Belle, LLC	Classic rock
WKYY	99.1 FM	Beaver Dam	Charles M. Anderson	Classic hits
WLAI	107.1 FM	Wilmore	Educational Media Foundation	Contemporary worship (Air1)
WLAP	630 AM	Lexington	iHM Licenses, LLC	News/Talk
WLBN	1590 AM	Lebanon	Simply Cool Radio, LLC	Oldies
WLBQ	1570 AM	Morgantown	Beech Tree Publishing Inc.	Classic hits
WLCB	1430 AM	Buffalo	Lincoln Radio, LLC	Classic country
WLCK	1250 AM	Scottsville	Skytower Communications Group, LLC	Southern gospel
WLCR	1040 AM	Mt Washington	LCR Partners, L.P.	Catholic
WLCU	88.7 FM	Campbellsville	Campbellsville University	College radio/Christian
WLEZ	99.3 FM	Lebanon Junction	Educational Media Foundation	Contemporary Christian (K-Love)
WLFX	106.7 FM	Berea	Wallingford Communications, LLC	Top 40 (CHR)
WLGC-FM	105.7 FM	Greenup	Greenup County Broadcasting, Inc.	Classic country
WLHE	88.7 FM	Cadiz	Madisonville Baptist Temple Inc.	Christian
WLHN-LP	95.3 FM	Brandenburg	Meade County Catholic Radio, Inc.	Catholic
WLJC	102.1 FM	Beattyville	Hour of Harvest, Incorporated	Worship music (Air1)
WLKS-FM	102.9 FM	West Liberty	Morgan County Industries, Inc.	Country
WLKT	104.5 FM	Lexington-Fayette	iHM Licenses, LLC	Top 40 (CHR)
WLLE	102.1 FM	Mayfield	Bristol Broadcasting Company, Inc.	Classic country
WLLK-FM	102.3 FM	Somerset	iHM Licenses, LLC	Top 40 (CHR)
WLLV	1240 AM	Louisville	New Albany Broadcasting Co., Inc.	Black gospel
WLME	102.7 FM	Lewisport	Hancock Communications, Inc	Sports (ESPN)
WLOC	1150 AM	Munfordville	Forbis Communications, Inc.	Variety
WLOU	1350 AM	Louisville	New Albany Broadcasting Co., Inc.	Urban adult contemporary
WLRT	1250 AM	Nicholasville	New Albany Broadcasting Co., Inc.	News/Talk
WLSI	900 AM	Pikeville	Mountain Top Media LLC	Contemporary Christian
WLSK	100.9 FM	Lebanon	Simply Cool Radio, LLC	Country
WLTO	102.5 FM	Nicholasville	Cumulus Licensing LLC	Rhythmic contemporary
WLUE	1600 AM	Eminence	New Albany Broadcasting Co., Inc.	Urban oldies
WLVK	105.5 FM	Fort Knox	W & B Broadcasting Co., Inc.	Classic hits
WLXG	1300 AM	Lexington	L.M. Communications, Inc	Sports (ESPN)
WLXL-LP	95.7 FM	Lexington	North Nicholasville Road Property Owners Association, Inc.	Spanish variety
WLXO	105.5 FM	Mount Sterling	Clarity Communications, Inc.	Classic country
WLXU-LP	93.9 FM	Lexington	North Nicholasville Road Property Owners Association, Inc.	Variety
WLXX	101.5 FM	Richmond	Cumulus Licensing LLC	Adult hits
WLYE-FM	94.1 FM	Glasgow	Forever Communications, Inc.	Country
WLZD-LP	106.1 FM	Hazard	Hazard Community Broadcasting	Rock
WMDJ-FM	100.1 FM	Allen	Floyd County Broadcasting Co., Inc.	Country
WMIK	560 AM	Middlesboro	Gateway Broadcasting, Inc.	Religious
WMIK-FM	92.7 FM	Middlesboro	Gateway Broadcasting, Inc.	Religious
WMJL	1500 AM	Marion	Samuel K. Stratemeyer	Silent
WMJL-FM	102.7 FM	Marion	Samuel K. Stratemeyer	Country
WMJM	101.3 FM	Jeffersontown	Alpha Media Licensee LLC	Urban adult contemporary
WMJR	1380 AM	Nicholasville	Immaculate Heart Media, Inc.	Christian
WMKK-LP	99.5 FM	Richmond	Richmond Community Radio Inc	Variety
WMKY	90.3 FM	Morehead	Morehead State University	Public radio
WMKZ	93.1 FM	Monticello	Monticello-Wayne County Media, Inc.	Country
WMMG-FM	93.5 FM	Brandenburg	Meade County Communications, Inc.	Variety
WMMT	88.7 FM	Whitesburg	Appalshop, Incorporated	Community
WMOR-FM	106.1 FM	Morehead	Morgan County Industries, Inc.	Adult hits
WMSK-FM	101.3 FM	Sturgis	Henson Media, Inc.	Country
WMST	1150 AM	Mt. Sterling	Gateway Radio Works, Inc.	Adult standards/Soft adult contemporary
WMTA	1380 AM	Central City	Custom Voice Media	Hot adult contemporary
WMTC-FM	99.9 FM	Vancleve	Kentucky Mountain Bible College	Southern gospel
WMTL	870 AM	Leitchfield	Heritage Media of Kentucky Inc	Country
WMXL	94.5 FM	Lexington	iHM Licenses, LLC	Adult contemporary
WNBS	1340 AM	Murray	Forever Communications, Inc.	News/Talk
WNES	1050 AM	Central City	Radio Active Media	Classic country
WNFC	91.7 FM	Paducah	Somerset Educational Broadcasting Foundation	Religious
WNGO	1320 AM	Mayfield	Bristol Broadcasting Company, Inc.	News/Talk
WNJK	105.9 FM	Burgin	Choice Radio NKJ Corporation	Adult contemporary
WNKJ	89.3 FM	Hopkinsville	Pennyrile Christian Community, Inc.	Christian
WNKR	106.7 FM	Williamstown	Grant County Broadcasters, Inc.	Oldies
WNKU-LP	92.1 FM	Covington	RGS Communications, Inc.	Classic rock
WNKW	1480 AM	Neon	Sunshine Media Group, LLC	Christian
WNLJ	91.7 FM	Madisonville	Pennyrile Christian Community, Inc.	Christian
WNLW-LP	95.1 FM	Williamsburg	New Life Radio, Inc	Christian
WNOP	740 AM	Newport	Sacred Heart Radio, Inc.	Catholic
WNRW	98.9 FM	Prospect	iHM Licenses, LLC	Top 40 (CHR)
WOKH	102.7 FM	Springfield	Bardstown Radio Team, LLC	Adult contemporary
WOKT	1080 AM	Cannonsburg	Big River Radio, Inc.	Christian talk
WOMI	1490 AM	Owensboro	Townsquare Media of Evansville/Owensboro, Inc.	News/Talk
WOPW-LP	93.3 FM	Mount Vernon	Central Baptist Church	Religious Teaching
WOVO	96.7 FM	Auburn	Soky Radio, LLC	Classic country
WPAD	1560 AM	Paducah	Bristol Broadcasting Company, Inc.	Sports (FSR)
WPBK	102.9 FM	Crab Orchard	Radioactive, LLC	Variety
WPDQ	91.3 FM	Scottsville	Southern Wabash Communications of Middle Tennessee, Inc.	Classic hits
WPJI-LP	94.9 FM	Hopkinsville	Pilgrims Journey, Inc.	Christian
WPJP-LP	100.7 FM	Madisonville	Christ the King School Scholarship/Endowment Fund, Inc.	Catholic
WPKE	1240 AM	Pikeville	Mountain Top Media LLC	Classic hits
WPKE-FM	103.1 FM	Coal Run	Mountain Top Media LLC	Classic rock
WPKY	1580 AM	Princeton	Ham Broadcasting Company, Inc.	Classic hits
WPRT	960 AM	Prestonsburg	Mountain Top Media LLC	Classic hits
WPTJ	90.7 FM	Paris	Somerset Educational Broadcasting Foundation	Contemporary Christian
WPTQ	105.3 FM	Glasgow	Newberry Broadcasting, Inc.	Classic rock
WQEZ	1370 AM	Fort Campbell	Saga Communications of Tuckessee, LLC	Spanish variety
WQHY	95.5 FM	Prestonsburg	WDOC, Inc.	Top 40 (CHR)
WQJM	1230 AM	Pineville	Penelope, Inc.	Rhythmic AC
WQNU	103.1 FM	Lyndon	SM-WQNU, LLC	Country
WQXE	98.3 FM	Elizabethtown	Skytower Communications-E'Town, Inc.	Hot adult contemporary
WREF	97.7 FM	Sebree	Henson Media of Henderson County, LLC	Sports (ESPN)
WRFL	88.1 FM	Lexington	Board of Trustees, University of Kentucky	College
WRFM	103.9 FM	Drakesboro	Nashville's Sportsradio, Incorporated	Sports (ISN)
WRHR-LP	95.3 FM	Corbin	Corbin Public Schools	Variety
WRIL	106.3 FM	Pineville	Pine Hills Broadcasting, Inc.	Top 40 (CHR)
WRJJ	104.3 FM	La Center	Janet Jensen	1980s hits
WRKA	103.9 FM	Louisville	SM-WRKA, LLC	Urban adult contemporary
WRLV-FM	106.5 FM	Salyersville	Morgan County Industries, Inc.	Country
WRND	94.3 FM	Oak Grove	Saga Communications of Tuckessee, LLC	Adult hits
WRNZ	105.1 FM	Lancaster	Hometown Broadcasting of Lancaster, Inc.	Hot adult contemporary
WRUS	610 AM	Russellville	Logan Radio Incorporated	Country
WRVG-LP	93.7 FM	Georgetown	Georgetown College	Top 40's during the day & Oldies Overnight
WRVK	1460 AM	Mount Vernon	Saylor Broadcasting, Inc.	Full service
WRZI	107.3 FM	Hodgenville	Elizabethtown CBC, Inc.	Adult hits
WSDF	100.5 FM	Louisville	iHM Licenses, LLC	Adult hits
WSEK	910 AM	Burnside	iHM Licenses, LLC	Classic country
WSEK-FM	93.9 FM	Burnside	iHM Licenses, LLC	Country
WSFC	1240 AM	Somerset	iHM Licenses, LLC	News/Talk
WSGJ-LP	92.1 FM	Bowling Green	Columbus Club, Inc.	Catholic
WSGP	88.3 FM	Glasgow	Somerset Educational Broadcasting Foundation	Religious
WSGS	101.1 FM	Hazard	Mountain Broadcasting Service, Inc.	Country
WSIP	1490 AM	Paintsville	S.I.P. Broadcasting Company, Inc.	Oldies
WSIP-FM	98.9 FM	Paintsville	S.I.P. Broadcasting Company, Inc.	Country
WSKV-FM	104.9 FM	Stanton	Moore Country 104, LLC	Country/Full service
WSOF	89.9 FM	Madisonville	Madisonville Baptist Temple Inc.	Christian
WSON	860 AM	Henderson	Jenson Media of Henderson County, LLC	Classic hits
WSPP-LP	93.5 FM	Hopkinsville	Immaculate Heart Radio Association	Catholic
WSTO	96.1 FM	Owensboro	Midwest Communications, Inc.	Top 40 (CHR)
WTBK	105.7 FM	Manchester	Choice Radio Corporation	Country
WTCO	1450 AM	Campbellsville	Tri-County Radio Broadcasting Corp.	Classic rock
WTCW	920 AM	Whitesburg	T.C.W. Broadcasting, Inc.	Country
WTHL	90.5 FM	Somerset	Somerset Educational Broadcasting Foundation	Christian
WTKY	1370 AM	Tompkinsville	Frank Keeton Aircasters, Inc.	Country
WTKY-FM	102.7 FM	Tompkinsville	Frank Keeton Aircasters, Inc.	Country
WTLO	1480 AM	Somerset	F.T.G. Broadcasting, Inc.	Adult standards
WTRT	88.1 FM	Benton	Pennyrile Christian Community, Inc.	Christian
WTTL	1310 AM	Madisonville	Madisonville CBC, Inc.	Contemporary Christian
WTTL-FM	106.9 FM	Madisonville	Madisonville CBC, Inc.	Adult contemporary
WTUK	105.1 FM	Harlan	Eastern Broadcasting Company	Country
WUBT	101.1 FM	Russellville	iHM Licenses, LLC	Urban contemporary
WUCO	1550 AM	Morganfield	Henson Media, Inc.	Sports (FSR)
WUGO	99.7 FM	Grayson	Carter County Broadcasting Co., Inc.	Adult contemporary
WUHU	107.1 FM	Smiths Grove	Forever Communications, Inc.	Top 40 (CHR)
WUIC-LP	102.5 FM	Wallins Creek	Torstrick Ministries, Inc.	Christian
WUKY	91.3 FM	Lexington	Board of Trustees, University of Kentucky	Adult album alternative (Indie rock)/NPR
WULF	94.3 FM	Hardinsburg	Skytower Communications – 94.3, LLC	Country
WUOL-FM	90.5 FM	Louisville	Kentucky Public Radio, Inc.	Classical
WVCT	91.5 FM	Keavy	Victory Training School Corp.	Christian
WVEZ	106.9 FM	St. Matthews	SM-WVEZ, LLC	Hot adult contemporary
WVHM	89.7 FM	Benton	Pennyrile Christian Community, Inc.	Contemporary Christian
WVJS	1420 AM	Owensboro	Hancock Communications, Inc.	Oldies
WVKY	101.7 FM	Shelbyville	Southern Belle, LLC	Country
WVLC	99.9 FM	Mannsville	Shoreline Communications, Inc.	Country
WVLE	99.3 FM	Scottsville	Skytower Communications Group, LLC	Soft adult contemporary
WVLK	590 AM	Lexington	Cumulus Licensing LLC	News/Talk
WVLK-FM	92.9 FM	Lexington	Cumulus Licensing LLC	Country
WVPK-LP	107.7 FM	Paducah	St. Johns the Evangelist Family Center, Inc.	Religious Teaching
WVRB	95.3 FM	Wilmore	Educational Media Foundation	Christian adult contemporary (K-Love)
WVVR	100.3 FM	Hopkinsville	Saga Communications of Tuckessee, LLC	Country
WWAG	107.9 FM	Mckee	Dandy Broadcasting, Inc.	Country
WWBZ-LP	102.5 FM	Hyden	Bohica	Variety
WWEL	103.9 FM	London	F.T.G. Broadcasting, Inc.	Hot adult contemporary
WWGY	99.3 FM	Fulton	Forever South Licenses, LLC	Country
WWHR	91.7 FM	Bowling Green	Western Kentucky University	College Progressive
WWJD	91.7 FM	Pippa Passes	Alice Lloyd College	Contemporary Christian
WWKY	990 AM	Winchester	Gateway Radio Work, Inc.	Christian
WWKY-FM	104.9 FM	Providence	Madisonville CBC, Inc.	Country
WWLT	103.1 FM	Manchester	Educational Media Foundation	Christian adult contemporary (K-Love)
WWQB	102.3 FM	Westwood	Serge Martin Enterprises, Inc.	Americana/Folk
WWTF	1580 AM	Georgetown	iHM Licenses, LLC	Alternative rock
WWXL	1450 AM	Manchester	Choice Radio Corporation	Sports
WWZB-LP	95.1 FM	Manchester	Wolfe Communications	Variety
WWZG	92.1 FM	Park City	Steven Newberry	Hot adult contemporary
WXBC	104.3 FM	Hardinsburg	Breckinridge Broadcasting Co., Inc.	Classic country
WXCM	97.1 FM	Whitesville	Hancock Communications, Inc.	Active rock
WXCN-LP	99.7 FM	Lexington	Lexington Christian Network, Inc.	Religious
WXKQ-FM	103.9 FM	Whitesburg	T.C.W. Broadcasting, Inc.	Adult contemporary
WXKY	96.3 FM	Stanford	Educational Media Foundation	Christian adult contemporary (K-Love)
WXKZ-FM	105.3 FM	Prestonsburg	Adam D. Gearheart	Oldies
WXLN-LP	93.3 FM	Shelbyville	Bullock's Christian Broadcasting Corporation	Religious
WXLR	104.9 FM	Harold	Adam D. Gearheart	Classic rock
WXMA	102.3 FM	Louisville	Alpha Media Licensee LLC Debtor in Possession	Adult contemporary
WXMZ	99.9 FM	Hartford	Radio Active Media	Oldies
WXND-LP	100.9 FM	Louisville	Xtendsound, Inc	Variety
WXOX-LP	97.1 FM	Louisville	Art FM, Inc.	Variety
WXYR-LP	104.5 FM	Monticello	Genesis Appalachian Project, Inc.	Contemporary Christian
WXZZ	103.3 FM	Georgetown	Cumulus Licensing LLC	Active rock
WYDX-LP	104.1 FM	Frankfort	Woods and Waters Land Trust	
WYGE	92.3 FM	London	Ethel Huff Broadcasting, LLC	Christian
WYGH	1440 AM	Paris	Hammond Broadcasting, Inc.	Religious / Gospel
WYGY	97.3 FM	Fort Thomas	Cincinnati FCC License Sub, LLC	Country
WYHH	89.7 FM	Highland Heights	Bible Broadcasting Network, Inc.	Conservative religious (Bible Broadcasting Network)
WYJR-LP	95.5 FM	Middlesboro	Middlesboro Board of Education	Classic rock
WYKY	106.1 FM	Science Hill	F.T.G. Broadcasting, Inc.	Adult contemporary
WYMC	1430 AM	Mayfield	JDM Communications, Inc.	Oldies/Full service
WYWY	950 AM	Barbourville	Choice Radio Corporation	Religious
WZLK	107.5 FM	Virgie	Mountain Top Media LLC	Top 40 (CHR)
WZNN	96.1 FM	Paris	Clarity Communications, Inc.	Americana/Folk
WZQQ	97.9 FM	Hyden	Leslie County Broadcasting, Inc.	Classic rock
WZVK	89.3 FM	Glasgow	Christian Family Media Ministries, Inc.	Christian adult contemporary
WZXI	1280 AM	Lancaster	Eastern Sky LLC	Talk
WZYK	94.7 FM	Clinton	Bristol Broadcasting Company, Inc.	Adult contemporary
WZZL	106.7 FM	Reidland	Withers Broadcasting Company of Paducah, LLC	Mainstream rock
WZZP	97.5 FM	Hopkinsville	Saga Communications of Tuckessee, LLC	Mainstream rock

== Defunct ==
- WAIA
- WANY
- WBLG-LP
- WCCR-LP
- WCPM
- WCWC
- WCYN-FM
- WEKC (Williamsburg, Kentucky)
- WENS-LP
- WFHS-LP
- WFLE
- WFUL
- WGRK
- WIAR
- WKVG
- WKYD-LP
- WKYR
- WLBJ
- WLGC
- WLKS
- WMMG
- WMOR
- WMTC
- WQFR-LP
- WQXY
- WRLV
- WRSL
- WSMJ
- WWKU
- WWLK
- WWXL
- WYAH-LP

== See also ==
- Kentucky media
  - List of newspapers in Kentucky
  - List of television stations in Kentucky
  - Media of cities in Kentucky: Bowling Green, Glasgow, Hopkinsville, Lexington, Louisville

== Bibliography ==
- Credo Fitch Harris (1937). Microphone Memoirs of the Horse and Buggy Days of Radio. Bobbs-Merrill Company. (About WHAS and early radio in general)
- Jack Alicoate, ed. (1939), "Kentucky", Radio Annual, New York: Radio Daily, OCLC 2459636 – via Internet Archive
- Federal Writers' Project (1939), "Press and Radio", Kentucky: a Guide to the Bluegrass State, American Guide Series, New York: Harcourt, Brace and Company, pp. 102–109, hdl:2027/uc1.32106000647070 – via HathiTrust
- Chas. A. Alicoate, ed. (1957), "Amplitude Modulation Stations - AM: Kentucky", Radio Annual and Television Yearbook, New York: Radio Daily Corp., OCLC 10512206 – via Internet Archive
- "AM Stations in the U.S.: Kentucky", Radio Annual Television Year Book, New York: Radio Television Daily, 1963, OCLC 10512375 – via Internet Archive
- Terry L. Birdwhistell (1981). "WHAS Radio and the Development of Broadcasting in Kentucky, 1922-1942". Register of the Kentucky Historical Society. 79 (4): 333–353. JSTOR 23379633.
- John E. Kleber, ed. (1992). "Kentucky Broadcasters Association". Kentucky Encyclopedia. University Press of Kentucky. p. 491. ISBN 0-8131-2883-8.
- Frances M. Nash (1992). "Broadcasting". In John E. Kleber (ed.). Kentucky Encyclopedia. University Press of Kentucky. pp. 125–126. ISBN 0-8131-2883-8.
- Paul A. Tenkotte; James C. Claypool, eds. (2009). "Radio". Encyclopedia of Northern Kentucky. University Press of Kentucky. ISBN 978-0-8131-5996-6.

== Images ==
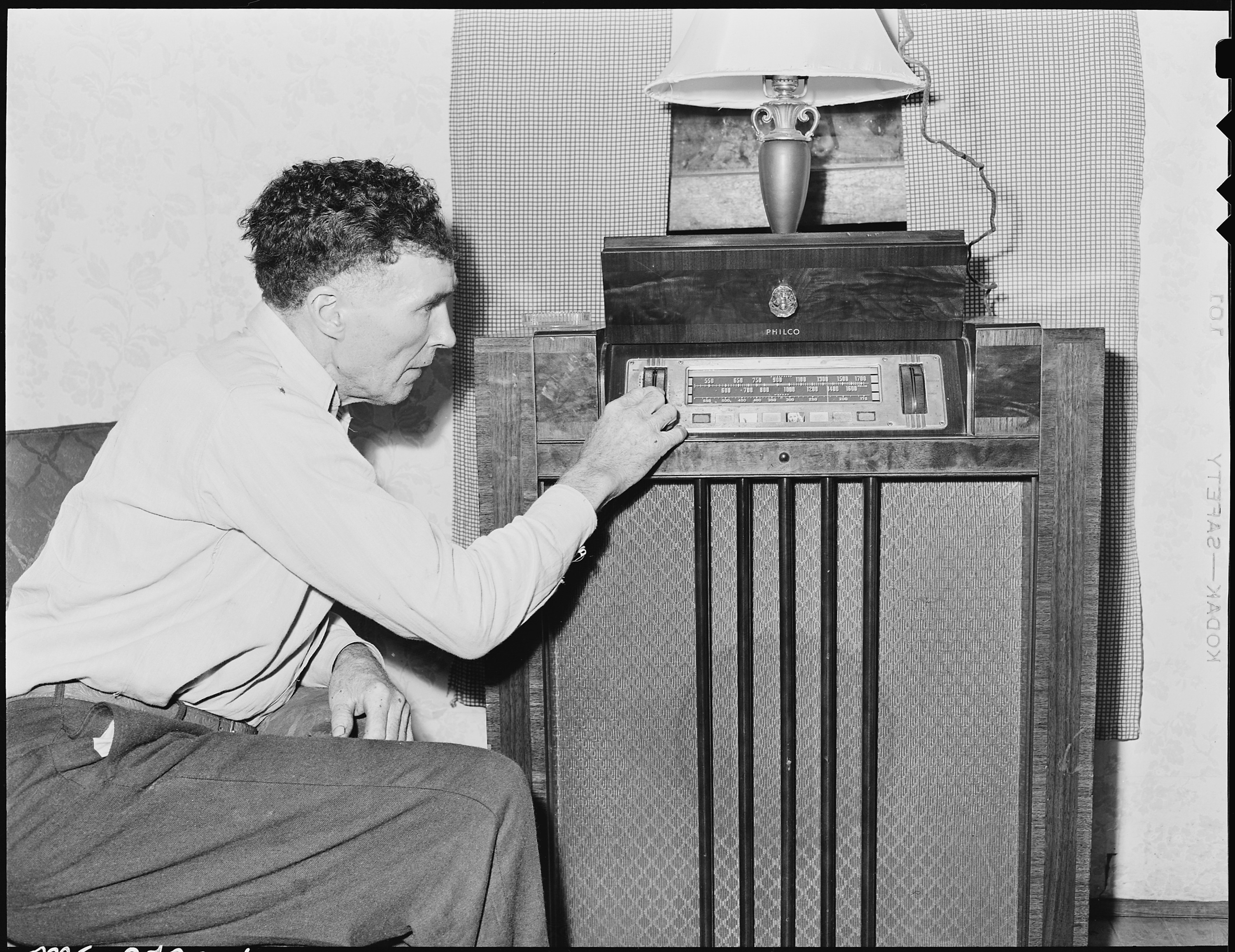
Radio listener, Harlan County, Kentucky, 1946

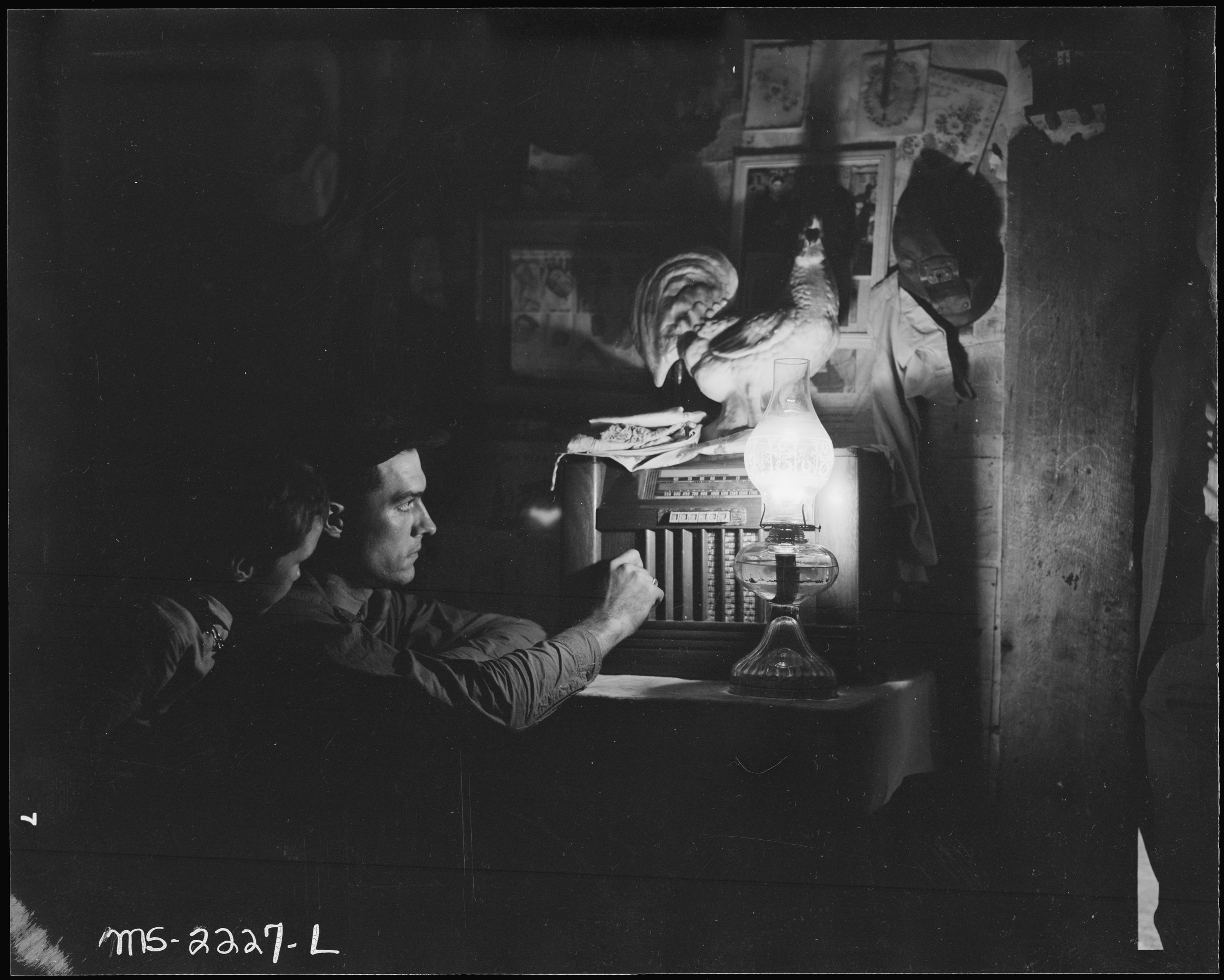
Radio listeners, Kentucky, 1946

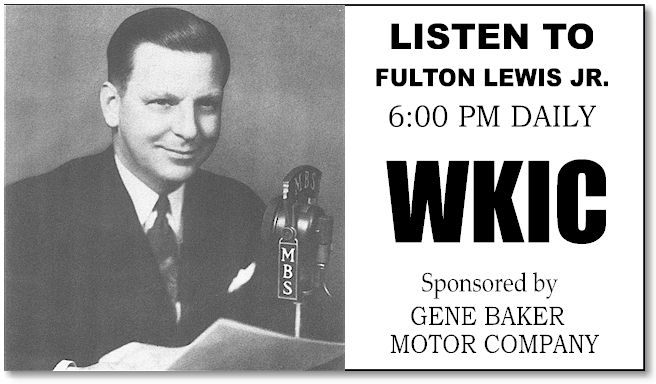
Advertisement for WKIC radio, Hazard, Kentucky circa 1950s

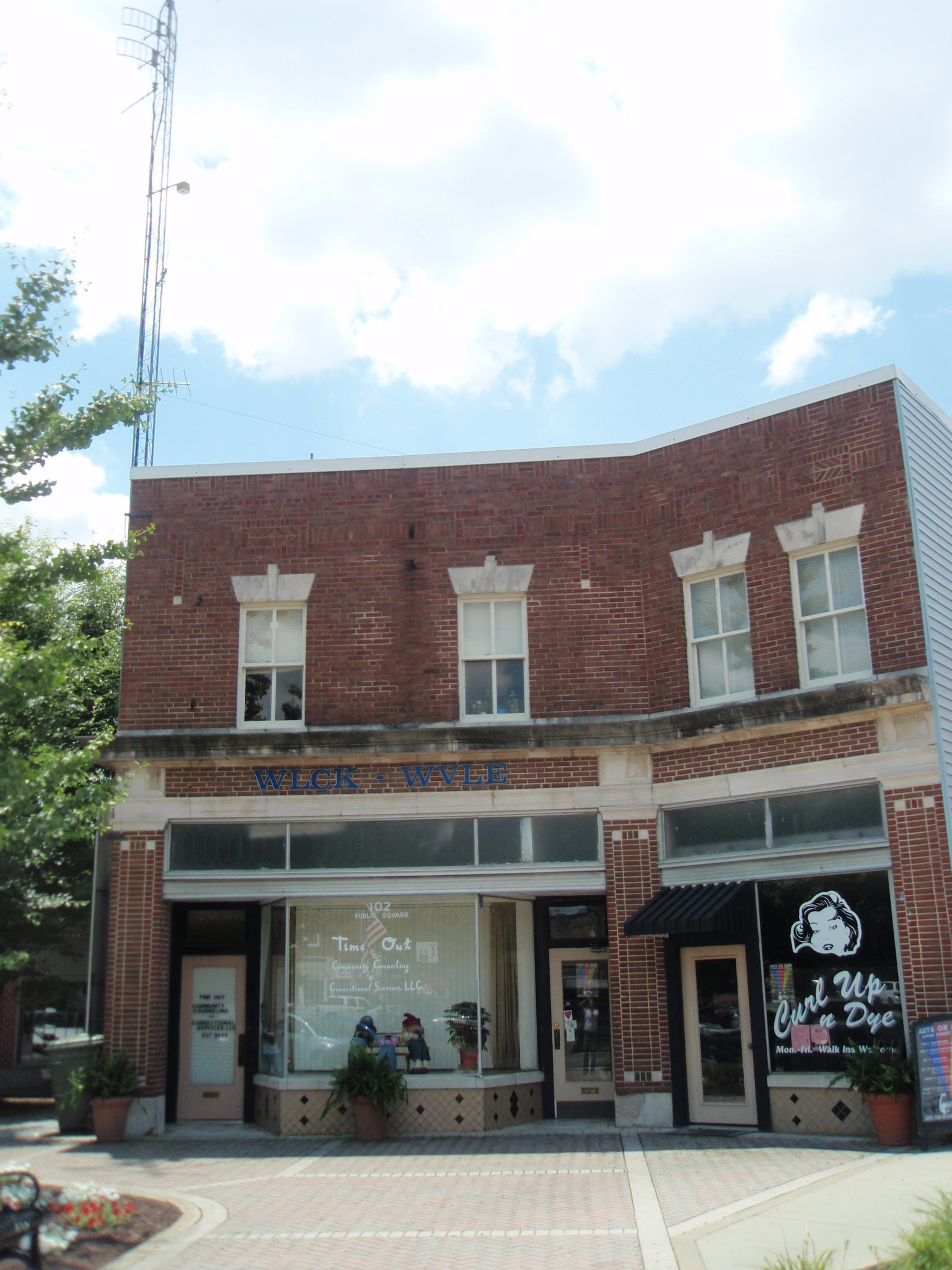
WLCK - WVLE radio station, Scottsville, Kentucky, 2012
