= Mass media in Glasgow, Kentucky =

Glasgow, Kentucky is technically considered to be part of the Bowling Green, Kentucky DMA, which is ranked as the 182nd largest media market in the United States.

== Print ==
- Barren County Progress - weekly newspaper

Glasgow is also served by the Bowling Green Daily News, which was originally based in nearby Glasgow Junction (now Park City) during that publication's early days of operation. That newspaper is published Monday, Wednesday and Saturday.

=== Defunct newspapers ===
- Glasgow Daily Times - published Monday through Saturday (1865–2020)

== Television ==
Glasgow is served by all television stations in the Bowling Green area. Glasgow was also previously served by select television stations from Louisville and Nashville, Tennessee on local cable systems.

The city of Glasgow proper is served by the Glasgow Electric Plant Board, while areas surrounding the city is served by the South Central Rural Telephone Cooperative. Both cable companies provide local public-access television channels serving the immediate area. Some other areas of the Glasgow micropolitan area, including parts of Barren and Metcalfe Counties, plus Cumberland County, are served by Mediacom.

Although WDNZ-LD (channel 11) is nominally licensed to Glasgow, no over-the-air broadcast television stations have any physical presence in Glasgow. However, ABC affiliate WBKO once operated a news bureau during the 1980s and early 1990s.

=== Television stations ===
==== Current ====
- WBKO
- WBGS-LD
- WKYU-TV
- WCZU-LD
- WNKY
- WNKY-LD
- WKGB-TV
- WDNZ-LD (licensed to Glasgow, but operates in Bowling Green)

==== Defunct ====
Glasgow was previously served locally by these Trinity Broadcasting Network owned-and-operated translators:

- WKUG-LP (channel 62, 2002–2007)
- WKUT-LP (channel 64, 2002–2010)
- WKUW-LP (channel 60, 2007–2010)

== Radio ==
In addition to most radio stations in Bowling Green, Glasgow is served locally by the following stations listed below.

=== AM stations ===
kHz	Callsign	Format	On-air identity	External link	Notes
1150 AM	WLOC	Variety	Studio 101		Licensed in Munfordville
1230 AM	WCDS	Sports	Fox Sports Radio		
1490 AM	WCLU	Oldies/Full service	1490 WCLU	WCLUradio.com	

==== Adjacent locals ====
kHz	Callsign	Format	On-air identity	External link	City of license	Notes
650 AM	WSM	Classic country	650 WSM	WSMonline.com	Nashville, TN	50,000 watt Clear-channel AM station
840 AM	WHAS	News/Talk	NewsRadio 840	WHAS.com	Louisville, KY	50,000 watt Clear-channel AM station
1370 AM	WTKY	Country	Kix Country		Tompkinsville, KY	
1510 AM	WLAC	News/Talk	NewsRadio 98.3 WLAC	WLAC.com	Nashville, TN	50,000 watt Clear-channel AM station

==== Defunct locals ====
- 800 AM - WSMJ - AC - Licensed to Cave City (1975–1991)

=== FM stations ===
MHz	Callsign	Format	On-air identity	External link	Notes
88.3	WSGP	Religious	King of Kings Radio		Full-time repeater of WTHL/Somerset
89.3	WZVK	Christian contemporary	Christian Family Radio	christianfamilyradio.com	Full-time repeater of WCVK/Bowling Green
91.1	WBFK	Gospel			Licensed to Hiseville; full-time repeater of WBFI/McDaniels, Kentucky
92.1 FM	WWZG	Hot AC	Zing! 106.7 & 92.1		Licensed to Park City, Kentucky; relays WHHT-HD3
94.1 FM	WLYE-FM	Classic country	Willie 94.1	willie941.com	
95.7 FM	W239BT	Top 40/CHR	95.9 The Vibe		
98.1	W251BT	Active rock	98.3 The Edge	983theedge.com	Translator of W252CV/Bowling Green, which rebroadcasts WPTQ-HD2 106.3-2/Glasgow
98.5	W253BN	Adult contemporary	102 3 Jack FM	wcluradio.com	Translator of WBGN/Munfordville
99.1	WHSX	Country	99.1 The Hoss		Licensed to Edmonton
102.3 FM	WBGN	Adult contemporary	102.3 Jack FM		Licensed to Munfordville
103.7 FM	WHHT	Country	103.7 WHHT		Licensed to Cave City
105.3 FM	WPTQ	Classic rock	105.3 The Point	1053thepoint.com	
106.3 FM	WBVR-FM	Country	Beaver 106.3	beaverfm.com	Licensed to Horse Cave
106.7 FM	W294DB	Adult contemporary	Zing! 106.7 & 92.1	N/A	Relay of WHHT-HD3

==== Adjacent locals ====
MHz	Callsign	Format	On-air identity	External link	City of license	Notes
90.1 FM	WJCR-FM	Southern gospel	WJCR		Upton	
98.3 FM	WQXE	Hot AC	Quicksie 98.3	WQXE.com	Elizabethtown	
99.3 FM	WVLE	Adult contemporary	99.3 Love FM		Scottsville	
102.7	WTKY-FM	Country	Kix Country		Tompkinsville	
105.7 FM	WGRK-FM	Country	105.7 The Frog		Greensburg	

=== NOAA Weather Radio ===
The National Weather Service forecast office in Louisville provides automated weather information to the entire Mammoth Cave tourism area via Horse Cave-based weather band radio station WNG570, broadcast on a frequency of 162.525 MHz. Glasgow is also served on a secondary basis by Bowling Green's weather radio station KIH45 (162.400 MHz).

== See also ==
- Kentucky media
  - List of newspapers in Kentucky
  - List of radio stations in Kentucky
  - List of television stations in Kentucky
  - Media of cities in Kentucky: Bowling Green, Hopkinsville, Lexington, Louisville
