= Mass media in Hopkinsville, Kentucky =

Hopkinsville, Kentucky is served by various media outlets. While it is one of two principal cities in its own radio market, it is considered to be part of the Nashville, Tennessee DMA, which is ranked as the 29 largest media market in the United States.

== Print ==
- The Kentucky New Era, founded in 1869, is the daily newspaper serving the city and surrounding areas.
- The Hoptown Chronicle is an online news outlet operated by a non-profit organization that provides public service journalism.

== Television ==
Hopkinsville is the largest Kentucky city to be considered to be a part of the Nashville, Tennessee television market, which includes nine counties along the Kentucky–Tennessee state line. Nashville is ranked at the 29th largest media market in the United States.

=== Television stations ===
While Hopkinsville does not currently have any locally based television stations of its own, the city was previously served locally by these stations and translators:

- WKAG-CA (channel 43, 1984–2010); first LPTV station to open in Kentucky.
- W62BH/W22CH (channel 62, later 22, 1987–2010), a former Trinity Broadcasting Network O&O translator.
- W64AV (channel 64, 1984–2003), a former translator of Kentucky Educational Television station WKMA-TV of Madisonville, Kentucky.

Currently, in addition to Nashville's full-power stations, Hopkinsville is served over-the-air by KET station WKMA-TV (channel 35) of Madisonville. Clarksville, Tennessee–based WCKV-LD (channel 21) transmits rimshot signals in at least the southern half of the city. Cable television subscribers are also served by a few locally based public access stations, as well as Bowling Green ABC affiliate WBKO and Paducah NBC affiliate WPSD-TV.

Mediacom and Charter/Spectrum are the primary cable television providers in the area.

== Radio ==
In addition to most radio stations in Clarksville, Hopkinsville is served locally by the following stations listed below.

=== AM stations ===
kHz	Callsign	Format	On-air identity	External link	Notes
1070	WEKT	Classic hits	Todd 1070 WEKT	WEKTradio.com	Licensed to Elkton, Kentucky
1110	WKDZ	Oldies	Oldies Radio 96.5/100.9 FM	WHVO.com	Licensed to Cadiz, Kentucky; primarily a simulcast of WHVO except for occasional solo broadcasts
1230	WHOP	News/Talk	NewsRadio 1230 WHOP	whopam.com	
1480	WHVO	Oldies	Oldies Radio 96.5/100.9 FM	WHVO.com	

==== Adjacent/Distant locals ====
kHz	Callsign	Format	On-air identity	External link	City of license	Notes
610 AM	WRUS	Variety/full service	WRUS 610	WRUSradio.com	Russellville, Kentucky	
650 AM	WSM	Classic country	650 WSM	WSMonline.com	Nashville, Tennessee	50,000 watt Clear-channel station
1510 AM	WLAC	News/Talk	NewsRadio 98.3 WLAC	WLAC.com	Nashville, Tennessee	50,000 watt Clear-channel station

=== FM stations ===
MHz	Callsign	Format	On-air identity	External link	Notes
89.3	WNKJ	Christian	Missionary Radio		
93.5	WSPP-LP	Catholic	EWTN Radio		
94.3	WRND-FM	Adult hits	Rewind 94.3	Rewind943.com	Licensed to Oak Grove, Kentucky; studio operations based in Clarksville, Tennessee
94.9	WPJI-LP	Religious	3ABN		
96.5	W243CH	Oldies	Oldies Radio 96.5/100.9 FM	WHVO.com	Translator of WHVO/Hopkinsville
97.5	WZZP	Mainstream rock	Z97.5	Z975.com	
98.7	WHOP-FM	Soft adult contemporary	LiteRock 98.7	WHOPFM.com	
99.3	W257EV	News/Talk	NewsRadio 1230AM/99.3 FM	WHOPAM.com	Translator of WHOP-AM
100.3	WVVR	Country	Beaver 100.3 FM	TheBeaverFM.com	Studio operations based in Clarksville, Tennessee
100.9	W265BW	Oldies	Oldies Radio 96.5/100.9 FM	WHVOradio.com	Translator of WKDZ-AM/Cadiz
106.5	WKDZ-FM	Country	106.5 WKDZ	WKDZradio.com	Licensed to Cadiz, Kentucky

==== Adjacent locals ====
MHz	Callsign	Format	On-air identity	City of license	Notes
101.1	WUBT	Hip-hop	101.1 The Beat	Russellville, Kentucky	Studio operations located in Nashville
101.9	WEKV	Christian	K-Love	Central City, Kentucky	
104.5	WGFX	Sports	104.5 The Zone	Gallatin, Tennessee	Studio operations located in Nashville

=== NOAA Weather Radio ===
The National Weather Service forecast office in Paducah provides automated weather information to the area via NOAA Weather Radio stations KXI26 (162.45 MHz) in Hopkinsville and WXJ91 (162.525 MHz) in Madisonville. The area is also served by station WWH37 (162.5 MHz) in Clarksville.

== See also ==
- Kentucky media
  - List of newspapers in Kentucky
  - List of radio stations in Kentucky
  - List of television stations in Kentucky
  - Media of cities in Kentucky: Bowling Green, Glasgow, Lexington, Louisville
- Media in Nashville, Tennessee
