= Mass media in Bowling Green, Kentucky =

Bowling Green, Kentucky, is the 182nd largest media market in the United States, with roughly 78,870 homes, 0.069% of all homes in the United States. As of 2022, the Bowling Green DMA comprises Barren, Butler, Edmonson, Hart, Metcalfe, and Warren Counties in Kentucky.

== Print ==
=== Daily newspapers ===
- Bowling Green Daily News
- College Heights Herald - the student newspaper at Western Kentucky University

=== Free publications ===
- Clip-It Shopper (defunct)
- Country Peddler (defunct)
- South Central Kentucky Homes
- SOKY Happenings
- The Sporting Times (defunct)

== Television ==
=== Full-power ===
- 13 WBKO Bowling Green (ABC, Fox on 13.2, The CW on 13.3)
- 24 WKYU-TV Bowling Green (PBS)
- 40 WNKY Bowling Green (NBC, CBS on 40.2)
- 53 WKGB-TV Bowling Green (KET/PBS)

=== Low-power ===
- 11 WDNZ-LD Glasgow (The Country Network)
- 31 WPBM-CD Scottsville (Religious independent)
- 34 WBGS-CD Bowling Green (Telemundo, Tennessee Valley Sports & Entertainment Network on 34.3)
- 35 WNKY-LD Bowling Green (Ion Television)
- 39 WCZU-LD Bowling Green

== Radio ==
While Bowling Green does not really currently have its own radio market, the general area is served by numerous radio stations. The Bowling Green radio market originally included Allen, Barren, Edmonson, Hart, Metcalfe, and Warren Counties.

=== AM ===
- 930 WKCT Bowling Green (Talk radio)
- 1150 WLOC Munfordville (Country)
- 1230 WCDS Glasgow (Sports/ESPN)
- 1340 WBVR Bowling Green (Country)
- 1450 WWKU Plum Springs (Active rock)
- 1490 WCLU Glasgow (Oldies)
- 1570 WLBQ Morgantown (Full-service/classic hits)

=== FM ===
- 88.1 WAYD Auburn (WayFM Network)
- 88.9 WKYU-FM Bowling Green (WKU Public Radio/NPR)
- 90.7 WCVK Bowling Green (Christian contemporary)
- 91.7 WWHR Bowling Green (College/Western Kentucky University)
- 93.3 WDNS Bowling Green (Classic rock)
- 94.1 WLYE-FM Glasgow (Classic country)
- 95.1 WGGC Bowling Green (Country)
- 96.7 WOVO Auburn (Country)
- 99.3 WVLE Scottsville (Adult contemporary)
- 100.7 WKLX Brownsville (Adult hits)
- 102.3 WBGN Munfordville (Adult hits/Jack FM)
- 103.7 WHHT Cave City (Country)
- 105.3 WPTQ Glasgow (Classic rock)
- 106.3 WBVR-FM Horse Cave (Country)
- 107.1 WUHU Smiths Grove (Contemporary hit radio)

=== NOAA Weather Radio ===
Bowling Green is also served by two NOAA Weather Radio stations:

- KIH45 at 162.400 MHz (primary coverage)
- WNG570 (Horse Cave) at 162.500 MHz (secondary coverage)

== See also ==
- Kentucky media
  - List of newspapers in Kentucky
  - List of radio stations in Kentucky
  - List of television stations in Kentucky
  - Media of cities in Kentucky: Glasgow, Hopkinsville, Lexington, Louisville
