= Mass media in Lexington, Kentucky =

This is a list of mass media in Lexington, Kentucky, United States.

== Newspapers ==
Lexington's daily circulating newspaper is the Lexington Herald-Leader. College newspapers include The Kentucky Kernel at the University of Kentucky and The Rambler at Transylvania University. The local alt-weekly is ACE Weekly. Business Lexington is a monthly business newspaper. KyForward.com is an online news site. The Chevy Chaser Magazine and the Southsider Magazine are two community publications. The only bilingual Spanish-English newspaper in the Bluegrass region is La Voz de Kentucky.

== Television ==
Lexington is served by the following television stations:

Channel	Call sign	Network
18.1	WLEX	NBC
18.2	WLEX-DT2	Grit
27.1	WKYT	CBS
27.2	WKYT-DT2	CW
27.3	WKYT-DT3	Circle
27.4	WKYT-DT4	MeTV
27.5	WKYT-DT5	Dabl
36.1	WTVQ	ABC
36.2	WTVQ-DT2	MyKY/MyNetworkTV
36.3	WTVQ-DT3	Justice
36.4	WTVQ-DT4	Twist
36.5	WTVQ-DT5	Court TV Mystery
36.6	WTVQ-DT6	Quest
36.7	WTVQ-DT7	QVC
46.1	WKLE	KET/PBS
46.2	WKLE-DT2	KET 2/PBS Encore
46.3	WKLE-DT3	KET KY
46.4	WKLE-DT4	PBS Kids
56.1	WDKY-TV	Fox
56.2	WDKY-DT2	Comet
56.3	WDKY-DT3	Charge!
56.4	WDKY-DT4	TBD
65.1	WLJC	COZI/Ind./Rel.
67.1	WUPX	ION
67.2	WUPX-DT2	Court TV
67.3	WUPX-DT3	Shop LC
67.4	WUPX-DT4	Laff
67.5	WUPX-DT5	Defy TV
67.6	WUPX-DT6	True Real

== Radio ==
It also has numerous radio stations:

=== AM stations ===
- WVLK (News / Talk) - 590 AM
- WLAP (News/Talk) - 630 AM
- WCGW (Southern Gospel / Christian Talk Radio) - 770 AM
- WCBR (Religious Programming) - 1110 AM
- WMST (Adult Standards / 1950s and 1960s Oldies) - 1150 AM
- WLRT (Religious Talk) - 1250 AM
- WLXG (Sports) - 1300 AM
- WMJR (Religious Programming / Gospel Music) - 1380 AM
- WCYN (1950s and 1960s Oldies) - 1400 AM
- WYGH (Religious Programming / Gospel Music / WIOK 107.5 FM simulcast) - 1440 AM
- WWTF (Comedy) - 1580 AM

=== FM stations ===
- WRFL (Alternative / College Radio) - 88.1 FM
- WEKU (Public Radio / Classical Music / NPR / PRI) - 88.9 FM
- WKVO, (Contemporary Christian Music / K-LOVE affiliate) - 89.9 FM "Positive, Encouraging K-Love"
- WMKY, (Public Radio / NPR) - 90.3 FM
- WPTJ, (Contemporary Christian Music / Religious Programming) - 90.7 FM "The Wind"
- WUKY, (Adult Album Alternative / NPR / PRI) - 91.3 FM "NPR Rocks at 91.3" in HD
- W219DM, (Religious) - 91.7 FM
- WBVX (Classic Hits) - 92.1 FM "B92"
- WVLK-FM (Country) - 92.9 FM "K92.9"
- WMXL (Adult Hits / Hot AC (Christmas music in November and December)) - 94.5 FM "Mix 94.5" in HD
- WMJR (Religious) - 94.9 FM (simulcast of WMJR 1380 AM)
- WVRB (Contemporary Christian Music / K-LOVE affiliate) - 95.3 FM "Positive, Encouraging K-Love"
- WZNN (Sports) - 96.1 FM "Sports 96.1 The Zone"
- WGKS (Adult Contemporary / Soft Rock (Christmas music in December)) - 96.9 FM "Kiss-FM"
- WBUL (Country) - 98.1 FM "The Bull" in HD
- WJMM (Religious) - 99.1 FM "Life 99"
- WXCN-LP (Religious) - 99.7 FM (Religious Programming / 3ABN Radio Affiliate)
- WKQQ (Rock) - 100.1 FM "100.1 WKQQ" in HD
- WCYO (Country) - 100.7 FM "100.7 The Coyote"
- WLXX (Adult Hits) - 101.5 FM "Jack FM"
- WKYL (Classical) - 102.1 FM "Classic 102.1"
- WLTO (Rhythmic Top 40) - 102.5 FM "Hot 102"
- WXZZ (Active Rock / Alternative Rock) - 103.3 FM "Z-Rock 103"
- WFRT (Classic hits) - 103.7 FM "Passport Radio"
- W280DO (Urban / Hip Hop) - 103.9 FM "Wild 103.9"
- WLKT (Top 40) - 104.5 FM "The Cat" in HD
- WLXO (Classic Country) - 105.5 FM "105.5 Hank FM"
- WNJK (Variety) - 105.9 FM
- WCDA (Top 40 / Hot AC) - 106.3 FM "Your 106.3"
- WLFX (Top 40) - 106.7 FM "The Dog"
- WLAI (Contemporary Christian Music / Air 1 affiliate) - 107.1 FM "The Positive Alternative, Air 1"
- WBTF (Urban / Hip Hop / R&B) - 107.9 FM "The Beat"

== Other ==
The Lexington Film League formed in 2009.

== See also ==
- Kentucky media
  - List of newspapers in Kentucky
  - List of radio stations in Kentucky
  - List of television stations in Kentucky
  - Media of cities in Kentucky: Bowling Green, Louisville

== Bibliography ==
- Gregory A. Waller (1990). "Situating Motion Pictures in the Prenickelodeon Period: Lexington, Kentucky, 1897-1906". The Velvet Light Trap (25). ISSN 0149-1830.
