= List of newspapers in Kentucky =

This is a list of newspapers in Kentucky.

== Daily and weekly newspapers (currently published) ==
Title	Location	Established	Frequency	Publisher	Notes
Adair County Community Voice	Columbia	2002	Weekly	Sharon Burton	
Adair Progress	Columbia	1987	Weekly	Donna Hancock	
The Advance Yeoman	Wickliffe	1889	Weekly	Kentucky Publishing, Inc.	
The Advocate-Messenger	Danville	1940	Tue–Sat	Boone Newspapers	Created by merger of The Kentucky Advocate and The Danville Daily–Messenger
The Anderson News	Lawrenceburg	1877	Weekly	Paxton Media Group	
Butler County Banner–Republican	Morgantown	1885	Weekly	Jobe Publishing, Inc.	
Barren County Progress	Glasgow	1882	Weekly	Jobe Publishing, Inc.	
Bath County News Outlook	Owingsville	1884	Weekly	Kentucky News Group	
Beattyville Enterprise	Beattyville	1883	Weekly	Nolan Media Group	
Berea Citizen	Berea	1899	Weekly	Nolan Media Group	
The Big Sandy News	Louisa	1885	Weekly	Big Sandy Publishing	
Boone County Recorder	Burlington	1875	Weekly	USA Today Co.	
Bourbon County Citizen	Paris	1807	Weekly	Genevieve Brannon	
Bracken County News	Brooksville	1927	Weekly	Kathy Bay	
Breathitt Advocate	Jackson	2009	Weekly	Bobby Thorpe	
The Carlisle County News	Bardwell	1894	Weekly	Kentucky Publishing	
The Casey County News	Liberty	1904	Weekly	Paxton Media Group	
Central Kentucky News-Journal	Campbellsville	1910		Paxton Media Group	
The Citizen–Times	Scottsville	1918	Weekly	Robert Pitchford	Created from merger between The Citizen (1908) and Allen County Times (1890)
Clinton County News	Albany	1949	Weekly	Allen Gibson	
The Crittenden Press	Marion	1879	Weekly	Allison Evans	
The Courier-Journal	Louisville	1868	Daily	USA Today Co.	
Cumberland County News	Burkesville		Weekly	Patsy Judd	
The Current	Fulton	2017	Weekly	Magic Valley Publishing Company	Created from merger of The Hickman Courier (1859), The Fulton Leader (1989), and The Hickman County Gazette (1904)
Cynthiana Democrat	Cynthiana	1868	Weekly	Paxton Media Group	
The Daily Independent	Ashland	1896	Daily	Community Newspaper Holdings	Originally of nearby Catlettsburg
Dawson Springs Progress	Dawson Springs	1919	Weekly	Paxton Media Group	
Eagle Post	Oak Grove		Weekly	Paxton Media Group	Free weekly produced by Kentucky New Era
Edmonson News	Brownsville	1927	Weekly	Jobe Publishing, Inc.	
Edmonton Herald-News	Edmonton	1882	Weekly	Jobe Publishing, Inc.	
Elliott County News	Sandy Hook	1940s	Weekly	Courier Life Publications	
Flemingsburg Gazette	Flemingsburg	1880	Weekly	Kentucky News Group	
Floyd County Chronicle & Times	Prestonsburg	2017	Wed, Fri	Lancaster Management	Created from merger of Floyd County Chronicle and Floyd County Times (1927)
Fort Campbell Courier	Fort Campbell	1963	Weekly	Fort Campbell	Advertising sold by Main Street Media of Tennessee
The Gallatin County News	Warsaw	1926	Weekly	Warnick family	
Garrard Central Record	Lancaster	1889	Weekly	Ted Cox	
Grant County News	Dry Ridge	1906	Weekly	Paxton Media Group	
Grayson Journal–Enquirer	Grayson	1946	Weekly	Community Newspaper Holdings, Inc.	Created from merger of Eastern Kentucky Journal (1916) and Sandy Valley Enquirer (1936)
Greensburg Herald–Record	Greensburg	1926	Weekly	Walt Gorin	Created from merger of The Green County Record (1895) and The Greensburg Herald (1926)
Greenup County News–Times	Greenup	1930s	Weekly	Community Newspaper Holdings, Inc.	
Hancock Clarion	Hawesville	1893	Weekly	Don Wimmer	
Harlan Enterprise	Harlan	1902	Wed, Sat	Boone Newspapers	Also known as Harlan Daily Enterprise from 1926 to 2018
Harrodsburg Herald	Harrodsburg		Weekly	April Ellis	
Hart County News-Herald	Munfordville	1989	Weekly	Jobe Publishing, Inc.	Created from merger of The Hart County Herald (1911) and Hart County News (1878)
Henderson Gleaner	Henderson	1883	Tue–Sun	USA Today Co.	
Henry County Local	Eminence	1879	Weekly	Paxton Media Group	
The Herald–Ledger	Eddyville	1901	Weekly	Paxton Media Group	
The Herald–News	Hardinsburg	1876	Weekly	Chris McGehee	
Hickman County Times	Clinton	2010	Weekly	Gaye Bencini	
The Interior Journal	Stanford	1872	Weekly	Boone Newspapers	
The Jackson–Breathitt County Times–Voice	Jackson	1888	Weekly	Nolan Media Group	Originally The Jackson Hustler
Jackson County Sun	McKee	1926	Weekly	Nolan Media Group	
Jessamine Journal	Nicholasville	1873	Weekly	Boone Newspapers	Merged with The Jessamine News–Week in 1957
The Kentucky Gazette	Frankfort	1787		Laura Cullen Glasscock	Started as the Kentucke Gazette in Lexington by John Bradford.
Kentucky New Era	Hopkinsville	1863	Daily	Paxton Media Group	
The Lake News	Calvert City	1984	Weekly	Loyd Ford	
The LaRue County Herald	Hodgenville	1879	Weekly	Paxton Media Group	
Lebanon Enterprise	Lebanon		Weekly	Paxton Media Group	
The Ledger Independent	Maysville	1968	Mon, Wed–Sat	Lee Enterprises	Created from merger of The Daily Independent (1907) and The Public Ledger (1913)
Leslie County News	Hyden	1963	Weekly	Vernon Baker	
Letcher County Community News–Press	Cromona	1960	Weekly	Mike Whitaker	
Lewis County Herald	Vanceburg	1924	Weekly	Dennis Brown	
Lexington Herald-Leader	Lexington	1870	Sun–Fri	McClatchy Company	Originally Lexington Daily Press
Louisville Defender	Louisville	1933	Weekly	Albin H. Bowman Publishing	
Louisville Eccentric Observer	Louisville	1990	weekly	Aaron Yarmuth	Free tabloid paper
The Manchester Enterprise	Manchester	1890	Weekly	Nolan Media Group	
Marshall County Tribune–Courier	Benton	1972	Weekly	Paxton Media Group	Created from merger of The Marshall Courier (1937) and The Tribune–Democrat (1903)
The Mayfield Messenger	Mayfield	1900	Sun, Wed, Fri	Paxton Media Group	
The McCreary County Voice	Whitley City		Weekly		
McLean County News	Calhoun	1883	Weekly	Paxton Media Group	
The Meade County Messenger	Brandenburg	1882	Weekly	Meade Media Group	Meade Media Group led by Steven R Laick, purchased The Meade County Messenger in January 2024
Menifee County News Outlook	Frenchburg		Weekly	Kentucky News Group	
The Messenger	Madisonville	1917	Tue–Sun	Paxton Media Group	
Messenger-Inquirer	Owensboro	1875	Daily	Paxton Media Group	
Middlesboro Daily News	Middlesboro	1911	Tue, Wed, Fri–Sat	Boone Newspapers	
Mountain Advocate	Barbourville	1904	Weekly	Nolan Media Group	
Mountain Citizen	Inez	1970	Weekly	Lisa Stayton	
The Mountain Eagle	Whitesburg	1907	Weekly	Ben Gish	
Murray Ledger & Times	Murray	1928	Mon–Sat	Lancaster Management	Created from merger of The Murray Ledger and The Times-Herald
The News–Democrat	Carrollton	1930	Weekly	Paxton Media Group	Created from merger of Carrollton Democrat (1868) and Carrollton News (1892)
The News–Democrat & Leader	Russellville	1992	Weekly	Paxton Media Group	Created from merger of The Logan Leader (1968) and The News–Democrat (1912)
The News–Enterprise	Elizabethtown	1974	Sun–Fri	Paxton Media Group	Created from merger of The Elizabethtown News (1869) and The Hardin County Enterprise (1926)
Olive Hill Times	Olive Hill	1969	Weekly	Community Newspaper Holdings	
The Paducah Sun	Paducah	1896	Tue–Sun	Paxton Media Group	
The Paintsville Herald	Paintsville	1901	Wed, Fri	Lancaster Management	
Pineville Sun–Cumberland Courier	Pineville	1908	Weekly	Nolan Media Group	
The Pioneer News	Shepherdsville	1882	Mon, Wed	Paxton Media Group	
Richmond Register	Richmond	1917	Tue–Sat	Community Newspaper Holdings, Inc.	
Salyersville Independent	Salyersville	1921	Weekly	David Prater	
The Sentinel–Echo	London	1908	Weekly	Community Newspaper Holdings, Inc.	Created from merger of The Mountain Echo (1873; 1877 in London) and London Sentinel (1907)
State Journal	Frankfort	1902	Tue–Sat	Boone Newspapers	Merged with The Frankfort News in 1912
The Times–Leader	Princeton	1992	Wed, Sat	Paxton Media Group	Created from merger of Caldwell County Times and The Princeton Leader (1940)
Tri–City News	Cumberland	1929	Weekly	Paul J. Wilder	
Troublesome Creek Times	Hindman	1980	Weekly	Karen J. Jones and Sharon Hall	
The Voice-Tribune	Louisville	1949	Monthly	Voice-tribune LLC Company	Originally The Voice of St. Matthews
The Winchester Sun	Winchester	1878	Tue–Sat	Boone Newspapers	Originally The Semi–Weekly Sun and Winchester Sun
Business Lexington	Lexington				
Butler County Banner-Republican	Morgantown	1885	weekly	Jobe Publishing, Inc.	
The Cadiz Record	Cadiz				
Commonwealth Journal	Somerset			Community Newspaper Holdings, Inc.	
Georgetown News-Graphic	Georgetown				
The Independent	Ashland		Daily	Community Newspaper Holdings, Inc.	
Kentucky Enquirer	Fort Mitchell			USA Today Co.	
The Kentucky Standard	Bardstown				
Leader-News	Greenville, Kentucky				
Monroe County Citizen	Tompkinsville	1990	Weekly	Jobe Publishing, Inc.	
The Oldham Era	La Grange				
Park City Daily News	Bowling Green				
The Sentinel-Echo	London			Community Newspaper Holdings, Inc.	
The Sentinel News	Shelbyville				
The Times-Argus	Central City				
The Times Leader	Caldwell County				
Times-Tribune	Corbin			Community Newspaper Holdings, Inc.	
The Trimble Banner	Bedford				
The Woodford Sun	Versailles		weekly		

== University newspapers ==
- College Heights Herald – Western Kentucky University, Bowling Green
- The Concord - Bellarmine University
- The Eastern Progress – Eastern Kentucky University, Richmond
- The Hill - Henderson Community College
- The Kentucky Kernel – University of Kentucky, Lexington
- The Louisville Cardinal - University of Louisville
- The Murray State News - Murray State University
- The Northerner - Northern Kentucky University
- The Patriot Newspaper - University of the Cumberlands
- The Pinnacle – Berea College, Berea
- The Quadrangle - Jefferson Community and Technical College
- The Rambler - Transylvania University
- The Thorobred News - Kentucky State University
- The Trail Blazer - Morehead State University, Morehead

== Defunct newspapers ==
Title	Locale	Year est.	Ceased	Notes	Ref.
Adair County News	Columbia	1897	1987	Founded by Charles S. Harris. Vol. 1, no. 1 (Nov. 3, 1897)-v. 70, no. 41 (Aug. 10, 1987).	
Big Sandy News	Louisa	1885	1929	Vol. 1, no. 1 (Aug. 27, 1885)-v. 45, no. 3 (Oct. 4, 1929). Merged with: Lawrence County Recorder, to form: Big Sandy News-Recorder.	
Citizen Voice & Times	Irvine	1976	2022	Created from merger of The Estill County Citizen Voice (1973) and The Irvine Times–Herald (1968)	
The Clay City Times	Clay City	1900	2022	Appeared concurrently with Spout Spring Times	
The Colored Kentuckian	Louisville	1867	Unknown	Edited by Philip H. Murray	
Glasgow Daily Times	Glasgow	1882	2020		
Hartford Republican	Hartford	18??	1926	Description based on: Vol. 4, no. 21 (Dec. 18, 1891).	
Jeffersonian	Jeffersontown	1907	1965	Vol. 1, no. 1 (June 13, 1907)-v. 59, no. 23 (Sept. 30, 1965).	
Kentucky Irish American	Louisville	1898	1968	Vol. 1, no. 1 (July 4, 1898)-v. 140, no. 22 (Nov. 30, 1968).	
The Kentucky Post	Northern Kentucky	1881	2007	Ceased operations December 31, 2007.	
Louisville Anzeiger	Louisville	1849	1938	German-language	
Louisville Herald	Louisville	1869	1925	Merged with Louisville Post in 1925 to form Herald-Post	'
Louisville Herald-Post	Louisville	1925	1936	Owners: James Buckner Brown, 1925-1930; Bankruptcy receiver 1930-1931; John B. Gallagher, 1931-1933; Walter H. Girdler, 1933-1936	
Louisville Times	Louisville	1884	1987	After Gannett, bought both the Times and Courier Journal, the Times ceased publication.	
The Sentinel	Radcliff	1961	2022	—N/a	

== See also ==
- Kentucky media
  - List of radio stations in Kentucky
  - List of television stations in Kentucky
  - Media of cities in Kentucky: Bowling Green, Glasgow, Hopkinsville, Lexington, Louisville
- Journalism:
  - Category:Journalists from Kentucky
  - Western Kentucky University School of Journalism and Broadcasting (est. 1999), in Bowling Green
  - Murray State University Department of Journalism and Mass Communications (est. 1975)
- Kentucky literature
U.S. newspapers

Comprehensive

- Lists of newspapers
- List of newspapers in the United States

Frequency

- List of free daily newspapers in the United States
- List of weekly newspapers in the United States

Circulation

- List of international newspapers originating in the United States
- List of national newspapers in the United States
- List of newspapers in the United States by circulation
- List of newspapers serving cities over 100,000 in the United States

Foreign language

- List of French-language newspapers published in the United States
- List of German-language newspapers published in the United States
- List of Spanish-language newspapers published in the United States

Specialty

- List of African-American newspapers in the United States
- List of alternative weekly newspapers in the United States
- List of business newspapers in the United States
- List of family-owned newspapers in the United States
- List of Jewish newspapers in the United States
- List of LGBTQ periodicals in the United States
- List of student newspapers in the United States
- List of supermarket tabloids in the United States
- List of underground press in the United States

Other

- List of defunct newspapers of the United States

== Bibliography ==
- S. N. D. North; United States Department of the Interior (1884). "Catalogue of Periodical Publications: Kentucky". History and Present Condition of the Newspaper and Periodical Press of the United States. Washington, D.C.: Government Printing Office. OCLC 1850475. (+ List of titles 50+ years old)
- William Henry Perrin (1888). Pioneer Press of Kentucky. Filson Club Publications. Vol. 3. Louisville. hdl:2027/umn.31951002225192b – via HathiTrust.
- James T. Haley, ed. (1895), "Newspapers: Kentucky", Afro-American Encyclopaedia, Nashville: Haley & Florida, hdl:2027/inu.30000029292855, OCLC 219597043
- "Kentucky". American Newspaper Directory. New York: George P. Rowell. 1900. pp. 361+. hdl:2027/umn.31951002273861a.
- "Kentucky". American Newspaper Annual & Directory. Philadelphia: N. W. Ayer & Son. 1922. pp. 369+. hdl:2027/umn.31951001295695n.
- Federal Writers' Project (1939), "Press and Radio", Kentucky: a Guide to the Bluegrass State, American Guide Series, New York: Harcourt, Brace and Company, pp. 102–109, hdl:2027/uc1.32106000647070 – via HathiTrust
- Thomas D. Clark (1948). Southern Country Editor. Bobbs-Merrill. OCLC 525858. (Includes information about weekly rural newspapers in Kentucky)
