= WMKJ =

WMKJ may refer to:

- WMKJ (FM), a radio station (88.1 FM) licensed to serve Tavernier, Florida, United States
- WLXO, a radio station (105.5 FM) licensed to serve Mount Sterling, Kentucky, United States, which held the call sign WMKJ from 2000 to 2010
- Senai International Airport (ICAO code WMKJ), a public airport in Johor Bahru, Malaysia.
