= WRLV =

WRLV can refer to:

- WRLV-FM, a radio station (106.5 FM) licensed to Salyersville, Kentucky, United States
- WRLV (AM), a defunct radio station (1140 AM) formerly licensed to Salyersville, Kentucky, United States
