= WSMJ =

WSMJ may refer to:

- WSMJ (AM), a defunct radio station licensed to serve Cave City, Kentucky, United States
- WSMJ (FM), a radio station (91.9 FM) licensed to serve North Wildwood, New Jersey, United States
- WRFM-FM, a defunct radio station (89.1 FM) formerly licensed to serve Wilkinson, Indiana, United States, which held the call sign WSMJ from June 2008 to October 2009
- WZFT, a radio station (104.3 FM) licensed to serve Baltimore, Maryland, United States, which held the call sign WSMJ from September 2003 to May 2008
