= Mass media in Louisville, Kentucky =

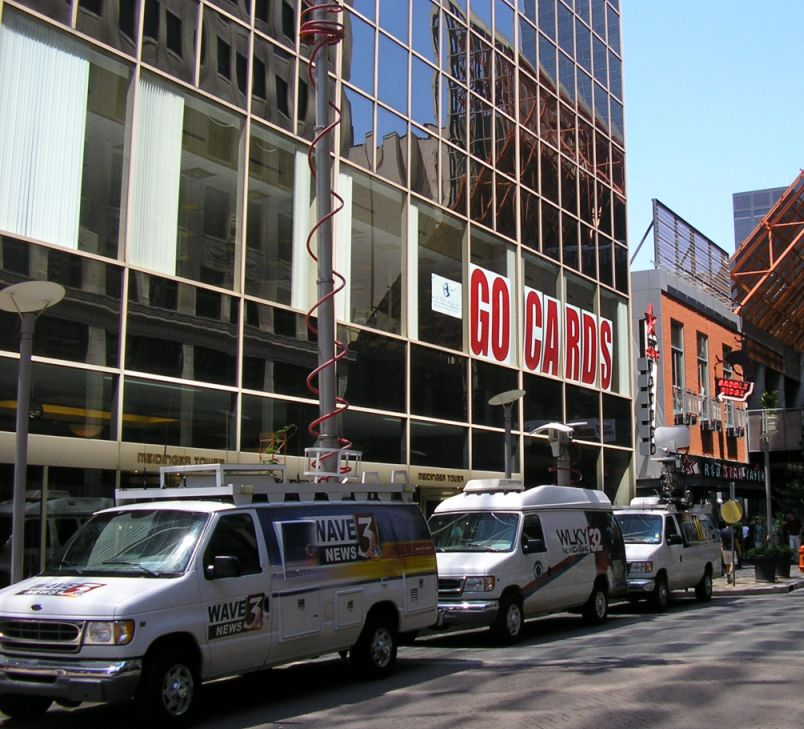
Vans of the three major news broadcasts in Louisville covering an event at 4th Street Live!

This is a list of media publications and sources in Louisville, Kentucky.

== Newspapers, magazines and online news ==
The local daily newspaper in Louisville is The Courier-Journal, a property of the Gannett chain.

Local weekly newspapers include Business First of Louisville, Louisville Defender (African American paper published since 1933), Louisville Eccentric Observer (or LEO, a free alternative paper) and The Voice-Tribune.

Louisville Magazine, published monthly, highlights the city's culture and lifestyles.

== Television ==
Louisville is also well served by television. Louisville's television stations include:

Call letters	Channel	Network affiliation
WAVE	3 (Cable 6)	(NBC)
WHAS	11 (Cable 4)	(ABC)
WKPC	15 (Cable 13)	(PBS/KET1)
WBNA	21 (Cable 21)	(Independent)
WMYO-CD	24 (Cable 138)	(Laff)
MetroTV	25 (Cable Only)	Louisville Metro affairs
WLKY	32 (Cable 5)	(CBS)
WDRB	41 (Cable 9)	(FOX)
WBKI; WBKI-3	58 (Cable 7); 58.3 (Cable 10)	(CW) (MyNetworkTV)
WKMJ	68 (Cable 15)	(PBS/KET2)

The only cable service available in Louisville is from Charter Communications (doing business as Spectrum). They provide standard and premium cable TV service, high-speed Internet access and digital telephone service.

== Radio ==
=== FM radio ===
Louisville's radio broadcasting stations cater to a wide variety of musical and other interests.

Call letters	FM frequency	Type	Special notes
WNAS	88.1	High school	New Albany High School
WJIE	88.5	Christian Contemporary	Licensed to Okolona, Kentucky
WFPL	89.3	National Public Radio	
WUOL	90.5	Classical	University of Louisville
WKUE	90.9	National Public Radio	Western Kentucky University - Elizabethtown, KY
WFPK	91.9	Adult Album Alternative	
WTFX	93.1	Urban/Hip Hop	"Real 93.1"; licensed to Clarksville, Indiana
WLCL	93.9	Sports	"93.9 The Ville"; licensed to Sellersburg, Indiana
WULF	94.3	Country	Licensed to and based in Hardinsburg, KY
WLGK	94.7	Worship	Licensed to New Albany, Indiana
WQMF	95.7	Rock	
WGZB	96.5	Urban/Hip Hop	"B96.5"; licensed to Lanesville, Indiana
WAMZ	97.5	Country	
WQXE	98.3	Hot Adult Contemporary	Licensed to and based in Elizabethtown, Kentucky
WNRW	98.9	CHR/Top 40	"98.9 Kiss FM"; licensed to Prospect, Kentucky
WDJX	99.7	CHR/Top 40	
WSDF	100.5	Adult Hits	"100.5 FM"
WMJM	101.3	Urban Adult Contemporary	"Magic 101.3"; licensed to Jeffersontown, Kentucky
WXMA	102.3	Soft Adult Contemporary	"102.3 The Rose"
WQNU	103.1	Country	"Q103.1"; licensed to Lyndon, Kentucky
WAKY-FM	103.5	Classic Hits	simulcast on WAKY/620, W261CO/100.1, and W292FS/106.3
WRKA	103.9	Classic country	"Kentucky Straight 103.9"
WAYI	104.3	Christian Contemporary	WAY-FM simulcast with WAYK/105.9
WGHL	105.1	Alternative	"Alt 105.1"; licensed to Shepherdsville, Kentucky
WLVK	105.5	Country	Licensed to Fort Knox; operations based in Elizabethtown, Kentucky
WAYK	105.9	Christian Contemporary	WAY-FM simulcast with WAYI/104.3
WVEZ	106.9	Hot Adult Contemporary	"Mix 106.9"; licensed to St. Matthews, Kentucky
WSFR	107.7	Classic Rock	"107.7 The Eagle"; licensed to Corydon, Indiana

=== AM radio ===
Call letters	AM frequency	Type	Special notes
Information Channel	530	Information	
WAKY	620	Classic Hits	simulcast on WAKY-FM/103.5, W261CO/100.1, and W292FS/106.3
WHBE	680	Sports	ESPN Radio affiliate
WKRD	790	Sports	
WHAS	840	News/Talk	
WFIA	900	Christian	
WGTK	970	News/Talk	
WLCR	1040	Christian	EWTN Catholic radio
WKJK	1080	Talk	
WLLV	1240	Southern Gospel	
WLOU	1350	Urban Oldies	simulcast on W297BV/104.7
WLRS	1570	News/Talk	
NOAA Weather Radio	1610	Weather	
Trimarc Traffic Channel	1610	Traffic	Louisville Metro traffic

== See also ==
- List of newspapers in Kentucky
- List of radio stations in Kentucky
- List of television stations in Kentucky
- Media of cities in Kentucky: Bowling Green, Lexington

== Bibliography ==
- J. Stoddard Johnston (1896), "Newspaper Press of Louisville", Memorial history of Louisville from its first settlement to the year 1896, Chicago: American Biographical Pub. Co., OCLC 3346757
- Kleber, John E., ed. (2001). "Television". The Encyclopedia of Louisville. Lexington, Kentucky: University Press of Kentucky. pp. 872–873. ISBN 0-8131-2100-0. OCLC 247857447.
