= The Winchester Sun =

Semi-weekly American newspaper

- Type: Semi-weekly newspaper
- Owner: Carpenter Media Group
- Publisher: Joe Imel
- Editor: Matt Cizek
- Founded: 1878
- City: Winchester, Kentucky
- Circulation: 2,983
- Price: $1.00
- Website: winchestersun.com

The Winchester Sun is a semi-weekly newspaper in Winchester, Kentucky, published on Tuesdays and Saturdays. It is the newspaper of record in Clark County, of which Winchester is the county seat. As of November 2025, the paper is owned by Carpenter Media Group and led by editor Matt Cizek.

== History ==
The Sun was first published November 1, 1878, as The Semi-Weekly Sun. It was known as The Winchester News from 1908 to 1912, after which it became The Winchester Sun. It has operated as a daily newspaper for much of its history, but in 2020, citing "economic hardship" from the COVID-19 pandemic, the Sun switched to a semi-weekly publishing schedule.

In 1936, the Tatman family purchased the Sun at auction for $44,000 following the death of previous publisher Carl Robbins. At the time, it was "usually a six-page paper with eight pages on Wednesday and four on Saturday," with a three-person editorial department, often relying on high school students as stringers to cover local sports. James Tatman would serve as publisher for more than 50 years, a period of growth for the paper and for the town of Winchester itself. By 1986, two years before Tatman's death, The Winchester Sun employed 39 people and maintained a circulation of more than 7,400 across Clark County.

Betty Berryman, publisher of the Sun between 1988 and 2006, was the first female president of the Kentucky Press Association and one of the first women to lead a state press association anywhere in the United States. In 1996, Berryman was inducted into the Kentucky Journalism Hall of Fame.
