= WEKC (Williamsburg, Kentucky) =

- Williamsburg, Kentucky; United States
- Broadcast area: Williamsburg and Vicinity
- Frequency: 710 kHz
- Branding: AM Gospel 710

Ownership
- Owner: Gerald Parks

History
- First air date: May 5, 1981
- Last air date: August 3, 2020

Technical information
- Facility ID: 72790
- Class: D
- Power: 4,200 watts (Daytime)
- Transmitter coordinates: 36°46′28″N 84°10′5″W

WEKC (710 AM) was a radio station which last broadcast a gospel music format in Williamsburg, Kentucky, United States. The station broadcast during daytime hours only, because it shared the same frequency as "clear channel" station WOR in New York City. WEKC was last owned by Gerald Parks.

== History ==
The Williamsburg Broadcasting Corporation was granted a construction permit for a new 250-watt radio station on 710 kHz on May 5, 1981.

The last licensee, Gerald Parks, failed to renew it in 2020, causing the station to be deleted on August 3 of that year. The call letters were then adopted by the repeater of WEKU in Corbin.
