= WYGH =

- Paris, Kentucky; United States
- Broadcast area: Lexington Metro Area
- Frequency: 1440 kHz

Programming
- Format: Religious broadcasting / Gospel Music (WIOK-FM Simulcast) (primary), Spanish (secondary)

Ownership
- Owner: Hammond Broadcasting, Inc.
- Sister stations: WIOK

Technical information
- Licensing authority: FCC
- Facility ID: 25901
- Class: D
- Power: 1,000 watts day 25 watts night
- Transmitter coordinates: 38°13′30″N 84°14′59″W
- Translator: (100.9 MHz) W265DT (Paris)

Links
- Public license information: Public file; LMS

WYGH (1440 AM) is a radio station licensed to Paris, Kentucky, United States, serving the Lexington area. It is a simulcast of what is broadcast on WIOK 107.5 FM in Falmouth, Kentucky. The station is currently owned by Hammond Broadcasting, Inc.
