= WFUL =

Radio station in Fulton, Kentucky (1951–2012)

Fulton, Kentucky; United States
- Frequency: 1270 kHz

Ownership
- Owner: River County Broadcasting, Inc.

History
- First air date: 1951
- Last air date: 2012
- Former call signs: WKZT (1988–2004)
- Call sign meaning: Fulton

Technical information
- Facility ID: 56555
- Class: D
- Power: 1,000 watts (day); 54 watts (night)
- Transmitter coordinates: 36°30′54″N 88°54′16″W

WFUL (1270 AM) was a radio station broadcasting a country music format. Formerly licensed to Fulton, Kentucky, United States, the station was owned by River County Broadcasting, Inc.

== History ==
The station began broadcasting in the summer of 1951 under ownership by Ken-Tenn Broadcasting.

The station's call sign was changed on March 17, 1988, to WKZT, in honor of former WNGO and WNBS engineer Kenneth Z. Turner, who bought the station in 1962, to celebrate his 50 years of employment at the station. Turner owned the station from 1962 until he sold the station to River County Broadcasting in 1990.

On July 5, 2004, the station changed its call sign back to WFUL.

On March 28, 2012, the station's license was cancelled and its callsign deleted from the Federal Communications Commission's database, per the licensee's request.
