= WZNN =

WZNN + QQWB HOUND FM
- Paris, Kentucky St. Albans, West Virginia; United States
- Broadcast area: Lexington-Fayette metropolitan area Charleston, WV metropolitan area
- Frequency: 96.1 MHz + 102.3 MHz
- Branding: 96.1 + 102.3 Hound FM

Programming
- Format: Americana/Folk

Ownership
- Owner: Clarity Communications, Inc.

History
- First air date: March 13, 1992; 34 years ago (as WWUD)
- Former call signs: WWUD (1992); WKYI (1992–1999); WULV (1999–2000); WLRS (2000); WLXO (2000–2021); WWRW (2021)

Technical information
- Licensing authority: FCC
- Facility ID: 59387
- Class: A
- ERP: 6,000 watts
- HAAT: 100 meters (330 ft)
- Transmitter coordinates: 38°12′15″N 84°32′51″W

Links
- Public license information: + QQWB HOUND FM Public file; LMS
- Webcast: Listen live
- Website: www.houndfm.com

WZNN (96.1 FM, "96.1 Hound FM) + 102. 3 WQBB Hound FM) is a radio station broadcasting an Americana/Folk music format. Licensed to Paris, Kentucky, United States, the station serves the Lexington metropolitan area. The station is currently owned by Clarity Communications, Inc. and is operated and managed by LM Communications via a local marketing agreement.

== History ==
The station went on the air as WWUD on March 13, 1992. On May 22, 1992, the station changed its call sign to WKYI, on July 13, 1999, to WULV, on February 16, 2000, to WLRS, and on March 1, 2000, to WLXO.

On Christmas Day 2020, the Hank classic country format moved from WLXO to then-WWRW (105.5 FM), which unlike the 96.1 facility covers the entire Lexington market, with a simulcast continuing for the time being on 96.1. The WLXO call sign moved to 105.5 on June 14, 2021; 96.1 then changed from WWRW to WZNN on August 16, 2021.

On Saturday, August 28, 2021, the format switched from classic country to sports as the new "Sports 96.1, The Zone".

On April 25, 2023, WZNN flipped to a hybrid format focused on Americana, Folk, and Bluegrass music branded as "96.1 The Hound". The station described the format on their website as "a local and fiercely independent Kentucky–centric anti-radio station. It answers to no corporation, no stockholders and no record label. It only cares about you. It is grounded by Kentucky roots, but is anything but traditional. The sound of The Hound is the music that feeds your soul, that keeps you up at night with tunes dancing through your head.”

== Previous logo ==
Hound FM Logo 2026
