= Kentucky New Era =

Daily newspaper of Hopkinsville, Kentucky

- Type: Daily newspaper
- Format: Broadsheet
- Owner: Paxton Media Group
- Publisher: Taylor W. Hayes
- Editor: Eli Pace
- Founded: 1869
- Language: English
- Headquarters: 1618 E. Ninth Street Hopkinsville
- Circulation: 7,809
- OCLC number: 14064300
- Website: kentuckynewera.com

The Kentucky New Era is the major daily newspaper in Hopkinsville, Kentucky, in the United States.

== History ==
The paper was founded in 1869 by John D. Morris and Asher Graham Caruth, as the Weekly Kentucky New Era.

In 1881, attorney Hunter Wood (1845–1920) became sole owner of the paper. Daily publication began in 1888, although the weekly also continued publication until World War II. Since 1920, it has been the only newspaper published in Hopkinsville.

In 1997, Hunter Wood's great-great-grandson, Taylor Wood Hayes, became CEO and publisher of the paper.

In November 2018, it was announced that the New Era, along with four other papers owned by the family, would be sold to Paxton Media Group.

== Notable stories ==
Among the most bizarre incidents reported on by the New Era is the celebrated Kelly–Hopkinsville encounter with aliens in August 1955.

== TV 43 ==
From its founding in 1983 through 2004, Kentucky New Era, Inc. also owned and operated local low-power TV station WKAG-CA.
