= National Weather Service Louisville, Kentucky =

Weather forecast office in the United States

National Weather Service Louisville is a weather forecast office responsible for monitoring weather conditions for 49 counties in north-central, south-central, and east-central Kentucky and 10 counties in southern Indiana. The office is in charge of weather forecasts, warnings and local statements as well as aviation weather. It is also equipped with a WSR-88D (NEXRAD) radar, and an Automated Surface Observing System (ASOS) that greatly increase the ability to forecast. The NEXRAD radar site utilized by the forecast office is located near West Point, Kentucky on the north side of the Fort Knox Military Reservation.

== NOAA Weather Radio ==

The National Weather Service Forecast Office in Louisville, Kentucky provides programming for nine NOAA Weather Radio stations in the office's jurisdictions.

=== Weather Radio stations ===
| Station | Frequency (MHz) | City of license | Power | Primary coverage area |
|---|---|---|---|---|
| KIH41 | 162.400 | Lexington | 1,000 Watts | Central Kentucky – Lexington and surrounding communities; Georgetown, Winchester, Versailles, Frankfort, Mount Sterling, Richmond, Berea, Stanford, Lancaster, Danville, Harrodsburg, Irvine, Paris, Cynthiana, Owingsville, Carlisle, Mount Olivet, Flemingsburg, and Stanton (Fayette, Scott, Clark, Woodford, Franklin, Montgomery, Madison, Lincoln, Garrard, Boyle, Mercer, Estill, Bourbon, Harrison, Bath, Nicholas, Robertson, Fleming, and Powell) |
| KIH43 | 162.475 | New Albany, IN/Louisville, KY | 1,000 Watts | Kentuckiana region – Breckinridge, Bullitt, Hardin, Henry, Jefferson, Meade, Nelson, Oldham, Shelby, Spencer, Trimble, and Counties of Kentucky; Clark, Crawford, Floyd, Harrison, Jefferson, Orange, Scott, Washington Counties in Indiana (Hardinsburg, Shepherdsville, Elizabethtown, New Castle, Metro Louisville, Brandenburg, Bardstown, La Grange, Shelbyville, Taylorsville, Bedford, KY; Jeffersonville, Marengo, New Albany, Corydon, Madison, Paoli/French Lick, Sellersburg, Salem, IN) |
| KIH43A | 162.55 | Elizabethtown | 300 watts | Bullitt, Hardin, Larue, and Nelson Counties Shepherdsville, Elizabethtown/Radcliff/Fort Knox, Hodgenville, Bardstown) |
| KIH45 | 162.400 | Bowling Green | 1,000 watts | West-central Kentucky – Bowling Green, Brownsville, Morgantown, Russellville, Franklin, Scottsville (Warren, Edmonson, Butler, Logan, Simpson and Allen Counties) |
| KZZ62 | 162.475 | Burkesville | 300 watts | Clinton and Cumberland Counties of Kentucky; Clay County, Tennessee -- Albany and Burkesville |
| KZZ63 | 162.525 | Campbellsville | 300 watts | Green and Taylor Counties -- Greensburg and Campbellsville |
| KZZ64 | 162.45 | Ekron/Brandenburg | 300 watts | Breckinridge and Meade Counties (Hardinsburg and Brandenburg) |
| WNG570 | 162.5 | Horse Cave | 1,000 watts | Kentucky's Cave Country – Cave City/Glasgow, Brownsville, Greensburg, Munfordville/Horse Cave, Edmonton, Tompkinsville (Barren, Edmonson, Green County, Hart, Metcalfe, and Monroe Counties) |
| WWF82 | 162.525 | Richmond | 100 watts | Garrard and Madison Counties -- Lancaster, Richmond, Berea |
| WZ2523 | 162.5 | Frankfort | 300 watts | Franklin County (Frankfort) |
