= WNKY =

Television station in Bowling Green, Kentucky

- Bowling Green, Kentucky; United States
- Channels: Digital: 24 (UHF); Virtual: 40
- Branding: WNKY NBC 40; WNKY CBS 40 (40.2); WNKY MeTV 40 (40.3); WNKY News 40

Programming
- Affiliations: 40.1: NBC; 40.2: CBS; 40.3: MeTV

Ownership
- Owner: Marquee Broadcasting; (Marquee Broadcasting Kentucky, Inc.)
- Sister stations: WNKY-LD, WDNZ-LD

History
- Founded: October 21, 1983
- First air date: December 17, 1989
- Former call signs: WQQB (1989–1992); WKNT (1992–2001)
- Former channel numbers: Analog: 40 (UHF, 1989–2009); Digital: 16 (UHF, 2003−2019)
- Former affiliations: Independent (1989–1992); Fox (1992–2001); Shop at Home Network (overnights, c. 1993–2005); ABC (NYPD Blue only, 1994–1997); UPN (Disney's One Too only, 1999–2003)

Technical information
- Licensing authority: FCC
- Facility ID: 61217
- ERP: 90 kW
- HAAT: 204.8 m (672 ft)
- Transmitter coordinates: 37°2′5.6″N 86°10′41″W

Links
- Public license information: Public file; LMS
- Website: www.wnky.com

WNKY (channel 40) is a television station in Bowling Green, Kentucky, United States, affiliated with NBC and CBS. It is owned by Marquee Broadcasting alongside Ion Television affiliate WNKY-LD (channel 35) and Glasgow-licensed Country Network affiliate WDNZ-LD (channel 11). The three stations share studios on Chestnut Street in downtown Bowling Green; WNKY's transmitter is located on Pilot Knob near Smiths Grove, Kentucky.

== History ==
=== Construction of the station (1983–1989) ===
The FCC granted a construction permit for channel 40 on October 21, 1983, to CMM Communications of Crossville, Tennessee. In 1984, the construction permit was bought by JMC, Inc., presided by local businessman John M. Cunningham of Crossville. On July 14, 1986, JMC would sell the station to Bob Rodgers, president of Word Broadcasting of Louisville, purchased the construction permit about two years after he successfully launched upstart station WBNA (channel 21) in that city. The sale of the station was finalized in 1988.

=== As an independent station (1989–1992) ===
The newly licensed station began broadcasting as WQQB on December 17, 1989. At its first sign-on, the outlet operated as a religious independent station airing an analog signal on UHF channel 40. Early on, it struggled in a small market used to all-VHF stations, where ABC affiliate WBKO (channel 13) was all but dominant in Bowling Green proper. The "Big Three" VHF stations based in Nashville were easily received either over-the-air or via cable in the Bowling Green area, and had equal loyalty that WQQB struggled to overcome. In the rush to come to air, it also had a poor overall signal that wasn't easily received, as well as on-air technical problems that occurred on a regular basis. In its first year, many television viewers in the area did not know of the station's existence as the station didn't have carriage on any cable systems at the time; the revised must-carry rules would not come into effect for another three years.

In March 1990, Storer Communications (later TKR Cable, later InterMedia, later Insight Communications, now Charter/Spectrum cable) became the first local cable system to carry the station, assigning it to cable channel 27, temporarily replacing Nashville commercial independent station WXMT (channel 30, now WUXP-TV), which had lost its Fox affiliation to WZTV (channel 17) that February; WXMT would return to area cable systems around 1993, when that station committed to become a charter UPN affiliate once that network launched in January 1995.

=== Sale to Southeastern Communications ===
In November 1991, Word Broadcasting Network sold WQQB to Southeastern Communications for $1 million. This came as Word Broadcasting president Bob Rodgers assumed additional duties as a church pastor in the Louisville area, and his decision to concentrate solely on operating WBNA in terms of the company's media efforts. The sale was approved by the FCC the following month. For WQQB's first few months under Southeastern ownership, it switched to a general entertainment format with a mixture of low-budget syndicated programming, like old movies (some of which were sourced from public domain media), sitcoms, and cartoons; this was done in preparation of becoming a network affiliate.

=== As a Fox affiliate (1992–2001) ===
On January 10, 1992, the station changed its call letters to WKNT, for "We're Kentucky News Television." The station's studios were relocated from the Smiths Grove transmission facility and tower to a facility on Campbell Lane shortly after the call sign change. On April 2 of that year, the station became the area's first Fox network affiliate with the then-new on-air branding as Fox 40; the rerun of The Simpsons episode "Saturdays of Thunder", which the series itself would later become a staple in the station's syndicated programming offerings, was the first network program to air on the station that evening. WKNT would then expand their broadcasting hours four days later. Shortly before the beginning of the station's Fox affiliation, Storer Communications reallocated the station to cable channel 7 on its lineup. Prior to the station's Fox affiliation, WXMT (which was WCAY-TV at the time of that station's Fox affiliation) and WZTV served as the region's de facto Fox affiliates; they served as significantly viewed stations for the market. WZTV was kept on most cable systems in the region into the 2000s and 2010s. In January 1993, WKNT installed a new antenna at its transmission tower.

During its time as a Fox station in the 1990s, WKNT broadcast select Southeastern Conference football games in syndication via Jefferson Pilot Sports until 2002; during the early 2000s, the men's basketball games were shared with WBKO until that station became the area's sole outlet for JP Sports (later Lincoln Financial Sports, then Raycom Sports) SEC broadcasts. From September 1994 until January 1997, the station also aired the controversial ABC drama NYPD Blue for its second and third seasons, and the early half of the program's fourth season, due to WBKO's refusal to air that program; the first season of that program never aired on either station in the Bowling Green market as WKNT declined the initial offer for the program. NYPD Blue moved to WBKO on February 4, 1997, after the new television content ratings system was introduced in January of that year.

WKNT also aired programming from the Shop at Home Network every day (except Saturdays) from 1 to 5 a.m. until that network's closure in 2005. The station also aired UPN's Disney's One Too program block from 7 to 9 a.m. weekday mornings and from 5 to 7 a.m. Sunday mornings to cover the children's educational programming requirements. It was the only UPN programming that aired in the Bowling Green market aside from WBKO's broadcasts of the first season of Star Trek: Voyager in 1995; all other UPN programming was only receivable via WUXP-TV (now a MyNetworkTV affiliate) in Nashville, as the de facto UPN affiliate for Bowling Green.

On January 1, 1997, the operation of WKNT was taken over by Crossroads Communications under a local marketing agreement (LMA). Crossroads, a subsidiary of Okemos, Michigan–based Northwest Broadcasting, would buy the station outright on July 17, 2000.

=== Unexpected loss of Fox affiliation; switch to NBC ===
In March 2001, Fox announced that it had dropped its affiliation with WKNT, because the station did not comply with the terms of the affiliation agreement; almost immediately, NBC agreed to affiliate with the station. On March 27, 2001, shortly after the affiliation switch to NBC occurred, the station changed its call sign to WNKY. At the same time, the station boosted its power from 776,000 watts to 1,640,000 watts, directional with a null to the east. WBKO was previously the only station within the Bowling Green market that was affiliated with a Big Three network, and WSMV-TV (channel 4) in Nashville was NBC's affiliate of record in south-central Kentucky for that station's first 50 years on the air. After WNKY switched to NBC, WSMV's over-the-air signal was still available in parts of the Bowling Green market, including locations where WNKY could not reach, and some cable systems continued to carry WSMV. Following the loss of WNKY's Fox affiliation, Fox programming had continued to be provided to most of the Bowling Green market over-the-air and on cable via Nashville affiliate WZTV, which had also been available over-the-air in the southern portion of the market in addition to its cable carriage long before WNKY's change in affiliation. Meanwhile, Louisville's Fox affiliate WDRB (channel 41) had been carried on cable systems in Hart and Metcalfe counties, along with the Glasgow Electric Plant Board's cable service. The lack of a local Fox affiliate in Bowling Green would last for more than five years until WBKO began carrying the Fox network on a second digital subchannel on September 5, 2006.

=== Max Media ownership (2002–2017) ===
In November 2002, Northwest Broadcasting sold WNKY to Max Media for $7 million; the sale was approved by the FCC in March 2003. On December 12 of that year, it signed on its digital companion signal on UHF channel 16 from its transmitter tower and facility in Smiths Grove. WNKY-DT was then added alongside its analog counterpart to local digital cable systems, including Insight in Bowling Green and the Electric Plant Board in Glasgow. On August 7, 2004, WNKY began airing NBC network programming in high definition, which occurred just in time to broadcast the network's coverage of the 2004 Summer Olympics in Athens, Greece. WNKY also installed a Dolby model 569 AC-3 surround sound encoder to relay the 5.1 full surround audio from the network.

On October 11, 2006, WNKY reached a long-term agreement with CBS to air that network on a new digital subchannel. Previously, Bowling Green was one of the last remaining areas east of the Mississippi River without its own CBS affiliate, and the market had received CBS from a number of surrounding affiliates, particularly WTVF (channel 5) in Nashville, which is considered to be a significantly viewed station, or WLKY (channel 32) in Louisville. Some cable systems carried both WTVF and WLKY. The subchannel was officially launched on February 1, 2007; the launch had finally gave Bowling Green a locally based CBS station, as well as in-market affiliates of all the "Big Four" television networks. In spite of the existence of WNKY-DT2, most cable providers still carried WTVF; it remains available to Mediacom cable customers in Butler and Edmonson counties, including Morgantown and Brownsville, as well as customers of Insight Communications (later Time Warner Cable, now Spectrum) in Bowling Green, and the South Central Rural Telephone Cooperative in the Glasgow area. In December 2017, WNKY claimed market exclusivity of NBC and CBS affiliates on the Glasgow Electric Plant Board cable system.

On June 3, 2010, as a result of the Satellite Television Extension and Localism Act of 2010, Dish Network began offering both of WNKY's NBC and CBS-affiliated digital subchannels.

=== Misuse of the EAS tones ===
On November 5, 2013, the Federal Communications Commission (FCC) fined the station's licensee, MMK License, $39,000 due to a mid-June 2012 ad for a local sports apparel store that was filmed and aired by WNKY, which featured Emergency Alert System (EAS) tones used in a promotional and non-warning situation. Per a settlement in the case, WNKY was also required to launch a local campaign about the EAS, air additional emergency preparation public service announcements, and lease space on their tower for modernized warning equipment to the Warren County Emergency Management agency and the City of Bowling Green.

=== Cable carriage dispute in Glasgow ===
On January 1, 2015, the Glasgow Electric Plant Board dropped both of WNKY's digital subchannels from its lineup because of a 1,000 percent increase in cost. Both WNKY and WNKY-DT2 returned to the Electric Plant Board's cable lineup in February 2015 after agreeing to a 100 percent increase instead of 1,000. The digital subchannels were placed on different channels (WNKY on 16 and WNKY-DT2 on 23) without high definition service.

=== Marquee Broadcasting ownership (2017–present) ===
On April 5, 2017, Max Media announced that it would sell WNKY to Marquee Broadcasting for $5.6 million. The sale was completed on June 30.

On January 1, 2018, the station launched a third subchannel to carry MeTV. In the same month, the CBS subchannel was upgraded to high definition, albeit in 720p rather than the network's recommended 1080i format to preserve bandwidth. A direct-to-cable full 1080i high definition feed of WNKY-DT2 became available on select cable providers.

In February 2021, the station relocated from its previous facility on Emmett Avenue on Bowling Green's west side to its current broadcasting facility on Chestnut Street in downtown Bowling Green.

== Sister stations ==
=== WDNZ-LD ===
WDNZ-LD (channel 11), licensed to Glasgow, Kentucky, United States, serves as an affiliate of The Country Network. Its transmitter is located near Polkville, Kentucky.

On February 24, 2023, Daily News Broadcasting sold WDNZ-LD to Marquee Broadcasting. The sale was approved by the FCC on April 7.

In 2024, WDNZ dropped its affiliations with Antenna TV, Biz TV and MyNetworkTV, which it held since 2019, after the sale to Marquee was finalized. The Country Network is now on the station's primary subchannel.

Subchannels of WDNZ-LD
Channel	Res.	Short name	Programming
11.1	1080i	WDNZ-LD	The Country Network
11.2	480i	WDNZ-LD	The Nest
11.3	480i	WDNZ-LD	Estrella TV

=== WNKY-LD ===
In July 2023, a new low-power station, WNKY-LD (channel 35), began broadcasting under Marquee ownership after the company purchased the license from King Forward, Inc., in 2022. It began broadcasting as a translator of WNKY, simulcasting all three subchannels from the same tower as the full-power WNKY's signal. It became a separate entity when it was converted into an Ion Television affiliate in September 2023.

Subchannels of WNKY-LD
Channel	Res.	Short name	Programming
35.1	1080i	ION	Ion Television
35.2	480i	IONPlus	Ion Plus
35.3	480i	Start	Start TV
35.4	480i	MeTOONS	MeTV Toons

== Programming ==
=== Sports programming ===
In 2016, WNKY and WNKY-DT2 began broadcasting Tennessee Titans preseason games not nationally televised, which originate from Nashville's ABC affiliate WKRN-TV, to complement the NFL on CBS package that includes most of the Titans' regular season games. This initially applied in non-Olympic years as WNKY-DT2 broadcast the first two preseason games when NBC covered the 2016 Summer Olympics. In 2018, WNKY announced that from then on, the station would carry all Titans preseason games on its MeTV-affiliated subchannel, WNKY-DT3, which had done so until after the 2025 preseason.

=== News operation ===
Weekday morning show logo (2009–2015)

As the first commercial television station to launch in Bowling Green, WBKO has been a longtime leader according to Nielsen ratings. Even after the sign-on of WQQB in 1989, WBKO has remained the dominant outlet for south central Kentucky. However, it has also competed with Nashville stations transmitting into parts of the Bowling Green area. As the area's original Fox affiliate, WKNT's first newscasts began during the 1993 fall season; Warren County Close-Up was the title of the station's newscast for the beginning. Later, in 1995, the newscasts expanded when the station teamed up with Campbellsville-based WGRB (which was also a Fox affiliate at the time, but would later become WB/CW affiliate WBKI-TV, now a defunct station) to form a two-station cooperative local "network" to jointly produce a local newscast. This joint news department employed local students from Western Kentucky University in varied aspects. However, by 1996, the newscasts ended due to low ratings on WKNT's part, WBKO's continued dominance in news ratings in the Bowling Green area, as well as financial difficulties; in 1995, the Associated Press filed a civil lawsuit against the station for back payments for the AP Newspower reports utilized by the station.

After the station's affiliation switch to NBC in March 2001, newscasts returned to the station's schedule when WNKY began simulcasting WSMV's 10 p.m. newscasts as part of a cooperative relationship between the two stations. These simulcasts lasted until the end of the 2002–03 television season, when they were replaced with syndicated programming. However, only the introduction originated from WNKY, and a WNKY logo covered WSMV's channel 4 logo. WNKY's commercials usually covered up the commercials run by WSMV.

On September 10, 2005, WNKY slowly re-entered the market with an unusual weather-only approach. Instead of full newscasts, it offered weekday morning and nightly local weather forecast cut-ins provided through AccuWeather. It began airing five-minute First Look AccuWeather forecasts on weeknights. In December of that year, weekend weather forecasts were added to the schedule.

In January 2006, locally produced weather updates began airing during NBC's Today Show on weekday mornings from 7 to 11 a.m. The updates covered regular and severe weather events. The weather team originally consisted of four employees—three human and one non-human member, "Radar the Weather Dog". Radar was a purebred Border Collie that was adopted from the Bowling Green/Warren County Humane Society in 2005. Radar began serving as the station's mascot when the weather show began with meteorologist Chris Sowers. Viewers would often see Radar interacting with one of the three meteorologists as they begin the weather updates. The weather dog idea may have been inspired by KPRC-TV in Houston which once had its own "Radar, the Weather Dog". WNKY's former sister station KYTX, in Tyler, Texas, took a similar approach with "Stormy, the Weather Dog." Radar died at age 16 in December 2017. He was replaced by his sister, "Soky", as the station's mascot.

In late January 2009, in a second attempt to compete with WBKO, WNKY launched a weekday morning show called Bowling Green Today produced in partnership with the Bowling Green Daily News. It aired for a half-hour at 6:30 a.m. The Daily News provided short local news updates and WNKY produced traditional weather segments. The show was replayed at 9 a.m. on WNKY's CBS-affiliated second subchannel. WNKY did not produce newscasts in the traditional 5 p.m., 6 p.m., and 10 p.m. slots or on weekends. During the summer of 2012, WNKY debuted a weekend news magazine program called In KY News, which included interviews and highlighted events in and around south central Kentucky.

On October 26, 2015, Bowling Green Today was renamed SoKY Sunrise, and was expanded to a one-hour program. On April 10, 2017, a new program titled SoKY at Noon made its debut on WNKY-DT2.

On February 19, 2018, WNKY began broadcasting live half-hour newscasts on weeknights at 5 p.m. on its main channel, and at 6 p.m. on WNKY-DT2. This marked the first time WNKY broadcast an evening newscast in any timeslot since the station ended simulcasts of WSMV's 10 p.m. newscasts in 2003.

From November 6 to 13, 2020, the station's newscasts were temporarily suspended because some employees were possibly exposed to COVID-19. Newscasts resumed on November 16.

On July 19, 2021, WNKY debuted its 10 p.m. weeknight newscast on its main subchannel. On March 7, 2022, the station began to simulcast their 10 p.m. newscasts over WNKY and WNKY-DT2. The simulcast of SoKY Sunrise between the main channel and the DT2 subchannel began in January 2023. The station continued to produce the six-minute weather updates on Saturday and Sunday nights at 10 p.m. on the DT1 and DT2 subchannels until September 9, 2023, when the station began airing 10 p.m. newscasts on Saturdays and Sundays. The station began airing a 9 a.m. newscast over WNKY-DT2 on weekdays, beginning on September 15, 2025.

As of September 2025, the station produces a total of 19 hours per week of news content. This includes 10 hours of news content on the main channel and 7½ hours exclusively on WNKY-DT2; 3½ hours of news content is simulcast between the DT1 and DT2 subchannels.

== Technical information ==
=== Subchannels ===
The station's signal is multiplexed:

Subchannels of WNKY
Subchannel	Res.	Short name	Programming
40.1	1080i	WNKYNBC	NBC
40.2	720p	WNKYCBS	CBS
40.3	480i	WNKYMe	MeTV

=== Analog-to-digital transition ===
On June 12, 2009, WNKY turned off its analog transmitter in compliance with the FCC-mandated digital TV transition of 2009. The station's digital signal remained on its pre-transition channel assignment, UHF channel 16, using virtual channel 40. WNKY was the last station within the Bowling Green market to make the transition.

=== Spectrum reallocation ===
After the FCC's 2016 spectrum auction, WNKY filed for a construction permit for its digital signal to relocate to UHF channel 24. WNKY changed to its current frequency at 12:01 a.m. on October 18, 2019.
