= WNJK =

Radio station in Burgin, Kentucky

- Burgin, Kentucky; United States
- Broadcast area: Nicholasville, Kentucky; Richmond, Kentucky; Danville, Kentucky; Lexington, Kentucky
- Frequency: 105.9 MHz
- Branding: Jess FM 105.9

Programming
- Format: Adult contemporary
- Affiliations: Westwood One

Ownership
- Owner: Choice Radio Corporation; (Choice Radio NJK Corporation)

History
- First air date: 2010
- Former call signs: WKYB (2007–2014)
- Call sign meaning: Nicholasville Jessamine Kentucky

Technical information
- Licensing authority: FCC
- Facility ID: 170979
- Class: A
- ERP: 3,000 watts
- HAAT: 141 meters (463 ft)
- Transmitter coordinates: 37°48′49.0″N 84°39′28.0″W

Links
- Public license information: Public file; LMS
- Webcast: Listen live

WNJK (105.9 FM, "Jess FM") is an adult contemporary formatted broadcast radio station licensed to Burgin, Kentucky, serving Nicholasville, Richmond, Danville, and Lexington in Kentucky. WNJK is owned and operated by Choice Radio NJK Corporation.

== Live Sports ==
Wilmore, Kentucky-based Asbury University (AU), entered into an agreement with Choice Radio Corporation, on November 16, 2018. WNJK would carry AU's men's and women's basketball games live, along with the "Asbury Sports Minute", airing twice daily. During AU's 2019/2020 athletic season, WNJK will add live coverage of baseball and softball games to the broadcast docket, which includes men's and women's basketball games.
