= WSMJ (AM) =

Radio station in Cave City, Kentucky (1975–1991)

- Cave City, Kentucky; United States
- Broadcast area: Glasgow, Kentucky; Mammoth Cave area
- Frequency: 800 kHz

Programming
- Format: Adult contemporary

Ownership
- Owner: Twin City Broadcasting (1974–1981); Rick Dubrose (1981–1984); Newberry Broadcasting (1984–1988); Murray Communications, Inc. (1988–1991) (final)

History
- First air date: May 23, 1975
- Last air date: 1991
- Former call signs: WKVE (1974–1984)

Technical information
- Power: 500 watts

WSMJ was a radio station that was broadcast at 800 kHz. Licensed to Cave City, Kentucky, United States, the station served Glasgow and the Caveland region of south central Kentucky. The station was last owned by Murray Communications.

== History ==
The first application with the Federal Communications Commission (FCC) by Twin City Broadcasting was filed in December 1974. The station began broadcasting as WKVE on May 23, 1975, under Twin City ownership. The station, which was first managed by former WBGN assistant manager/staff announcer Barry Williams, originally transmitted from a tower on the southern outskirts of Cave City along U.S. Route 31W. Evidence from old radio-and-TV-hobbyist publications dating from the 1970s to 1984 show that WKVE was broadcasting a Top-40 format. Throughout its life, the station also utilized some programming from ABC Radio. It was originally a daytime-only station that broadcast at a power of 250 watts.

The station was sold to Rick Dubrose in 1981. Three years later, Newberry Broadcasting purchased the station. In 1984, the station switched to an adult contemporary format, and change the station's call letters to WSMJ.

On February 5, 1985, WSMJ increased its transmitter power from 250 watts to 500 watts. Signal orientation was changed to non-directional. On October 21, 1987, Newberry filed an application to sell the station to Murray Communications, Inc.

On August 26, 1986, the station was briefly knocked off the air by a severe storm. Some minimal damage to the studio's occurred due to high winds.

The station permanently went off the air in 1991 due to financial problems. The permanent sign off was also because the station was unable to maintain a good-quality signal and/or gain consistent listenership and ratings against Munfordville's WCLU-FM, Bowling Green's WBLG-FM (now WUHU), or Nashville's WYHY (now WRVW), all of which also broadcast an adult contemporary format (in the case of WRVW, now broadcasting a top-40 format as of February 1996). WHHT, which Newberry built in 1988, was also an AC format radio station, but has since switched to a country format in 2013 after a frequency swap with WPTQ. Currently, WHHT is the only radio station in the market that has a broadcasting license to the town of Cave City itself. In spite of this, the Cave City/Glasgow area is still served by full-service radio station WCLU, Munfordville-based WLOC, and most full-power FM stations from Bowling Green and Nashville.

== On-air personalities ==
- Rick Dubrose - a former owner of the station
