= WHSX =

- Edmonton, Kentucky; United States
- Broadcast area: Bowling Green
- Frequency: 99.1 MHz
- Branding: The Hoss

Programming
- Format: Country music

Ownership
- Owner: Vikki Froggett and David Ray Froggett, Jr.; (South 65 Communications, LLC)

History
- Former call signs: WSRG (1989–1990); WKNK (1990–2005)

Technical information
- Licensing authority: FCC
- Facility ID: 48707
- Class: A
- ERP: 6,000 watts
- HAAT: 100.0 meters
- Transmitter coordinates: 37°01′33″N 85°33′14″W

Links
- Public license information: Public file; LMS
- Webcast: listen live (Requires Windows Media Player or VLC)
- Website: whsxfm.com

WHSX (99.1 FM) is a radio station broadcasting a country music format. Licensed to Edmonton, Kentucky, the station serves the Bowling Green metropolitan area. The station is owned by Vikki Froggett and David Ray Froggett Jr. through licensee South 65 Communications, LLC.

== History ==
The station's construction permit was issued on September 29, 1989, with the call sign WSRG. On January 30, 1990, the station changed its call sign to WKNK, with the station airing its inaugural broadcast in April 1990. The station has been airing a country format from its beginning.

On September 1, 2005, the station changed its callsign to the current WHSX.
