= WMJR =

- Nicholasville, Kentucky; United States
- Broadcast area: Lexington Metropolitan Area
- Frequency: 1380 kHz
- Branding: Relevant Radio

Programming
- Format: Christian radio
- Affiliations: Relevant Radio

Ownership
- Owner: Relevant Radio, Inc.

History
- Former call signs: WHRS (1985–1994); WLNT (1994–1996); WINH (1996–1997)

Technical information
- Licensing authority: FCC
- Facility ID: 72321
- Class: D
- Power: 5,000 watts day 38 watts night
- Transmitter coordinates: 37°54′27″N 84°28′42″W
- Repeater: 94.9 MHz W235AK (Lexington)

Links
- Public license information: Public file; LMS
- Webcast: Listen live
- Website: Relevant Radio

WMJR (1380 AM) is a radio station broadcasting a Catholic format as an affiliate of Relevant Radio. Licensed to Nicholasville, Kentucky, United States, the station serves the Lexington area. The station is owned by Relevant Radio, Inc.

== History ==
The station went on the air as WHRS on December 26, 1985. On August 1, 1994, the station changed its call sign to WLNT, on January 19, 1996, to WINH, and on August 5, 1997, to the current WMJR.

== Translator ==
WMJR has an FM translator in Lexington on 94.9 MHz. Its call letters are W235AK. It broadcasts with an effected radiated power of 250 watts and its antenna is 468 feet (143 meters) in height above average terrain elevation. This FM translator station was put into place to allow the broadcast of WMJR to be heard throughout metropolitan Lexington at night, as the AM signal is greatly deteriorated at night. Additionally, the sound quality of WMJR broadcasts is much greater on the FM translator than on the AM frequency. Individuals who may prefer the FM band over the AM band now have a way to listen to WMJR without leaving the FM band.
