= WPJI-LP =

- Hopkinsville, Kentucky; United States
- Frequency: 94.9 MHz

Programming
- Format: Religious

Ownership
- Owner: Pilgrims Journey, Inc.

History
- First air date: 2004

Technical information
- Licensing authority: FCC
- Facility ID: 135616
- Class: L1
- ERP: 100 watts
- HAAT: 20.6 meters (68 ft)
- Transmitter coordinates: 36°50′48.00″N 87°32′11.00″W

Links
- Public license information: LMS

WPJI-LP (94.9 FM) was an American low-power FM radio station licensed to Hopkinsville, Kentucky. The station was last owned by Pilgrims Journey, Inc. Its license was deleted on April 16, 2026.
