= WRLV (AM) =

- Salyersville, Kentucky; United States
- Frequency: 1140 kHz

Ownership
- Owner: Morgan County Industries, Inc.

History
- First air date: September 1979
- Last air date: April 11, 2017

Technical information
- Facility ID: 37256
- Class: D
- Power: 1,000 watts (days only)
- Transmitter coordinates: 37°45′27.8″N 83°03′50.4″W

WRLV (1140 AM) was a radio station broadcasting an oldies format. Established in 1979, the station was licensed to serve Salyersville, Kentucky, United States. WRLV was owned by Morgan County Industries, Inc. WRLV surrendered its license on April 11, 2017.
