= WLCR =

AM radio station in Kentucky, US

- Mount Washington, Kentucky; United States
- Broadcast area: Louisville metropolitan area
- Frequency: 1040 kHz
- Branding: Spirit & Truth

Programming
- Format: Catholic radio
- Affiliations: EWTN Radio

Ownership
- Owner: LCR Partners, L.P.

History
- First air date: October 29, 1955
- Former call signs: WSAC (1955–1984); WBUL (1984–1999)
- Former frequencies: 1470 kHz (1955–2004)

Technical information
- Licensing authority: FCC
- Facility ID: 58742
- Class: D
- Power: 1,500 watts days only
- Transmitter coordinates: 38°0′11.2″N 85°40′50.8″W
- Translator: (94.9 MHz) W235CZ (Fisherville)

Links
- Public license information: Public file; LMS
- Webcast: Listen live
- Website: www.wlcr.org

WLCR (1040 AM) is a radio station broadcasting a Catholic radio format. It is licensed to Mount Washington, Kentucky, and serves the Louisville metropolitan area. It carries programming from EWTN Radio and is owned by LCR Partners, L.P.

WLCR is a Class D daytimer station. AM 1040 is a clear channel frequency reserved for WHO in Des Moines. By day, WLCR is powered at 1,500 watts non-directional. To avoid interference to WHO, WLCR must leave the airwaves at night. Programming is heard around the clock on FM translator W235CZ at 94.9 MHz in Fisherville.

== History ==
The station signed on the air on October 29, 1955. Its original call sign was WSAC and it was licensed to Radcliff at 1470 AM. WSAC was owned by the Fort Knox Broadcasting Company. It has always been a daytime-only station. In 1958, it moved to Fort Knox.

In its early years, the station aired a Top 40 format. It changed its call sign to WBUL on August 20, 1984, and became an adult contemporary station. WBUL was a former Louisville market affiliate for Rick Dees Weekly Top 40, which was usually heard on contemporary hit FM stations. This lasted for a short time until WDJX, an FM contemporary station in Louisville, began carrying the program.

On May 26, 1999, the station changed its call sign to the current WLCR. It began broadcasting Catholic programming, mostly from EWTN.

The call letters WLCR were once assigned to an AM station in Torrington, Connecticut. That station began broadcasting January 1, 1948, on 990 kHz with 1 kW power.
