= WSPP-LP =

- Hopkinsville, Kentucky; United States
- Frequency: 93.5 MHz

Ownership
- Owner: Immaculate Heart Radio Association

Technical information
- Licensing authority: FCC
- Facility ID: 135680
- Class: L1
- ERP: 100 watts
- HAAT: 29.1 meters
- Transmitter coordinates: 36°52′15.00″N 87°30′43.00″W

Links
- Public license information: LMS

WSPP-LP (93.5 FM) is a radio station licensed to Hopkinsville, Kentucky, United States. The station is currently owned by Immaculate Heart Radio Association.
