= Glasgow Daily Times =

Defunct American newspaper in Glasgow, Kentucky

- Type: Newspaper
- Founded: 1865
- Ceased publication: 2020

The Glasgow Daily Times is a newspaper that was based in Glasgow, Kentucky.

Previously published daily except Saturdays, the print schedule was reduced to three days a week (Tuesdays, Thursdays, and Saturdays) in April 2020, eight weeks before it was shut down.

== History ==
The newspaper originated in 1865 as the Glasgow Times weekly newspaper. It became a daily newspaper in 1953 after merging with the Glasgow Evening Journal.
