= WIOK =

Radio station in Falmouth, Kentucky

- Falmouth, Kentucky; United States
- Broadcast area: Falmouth; Northern Kentucky; Cincinnati
- Frequency: 107.5 MHz
- Branding: 107.5 Tri State Gospel

Programming
- Format: Southern gospel; Christian talk and teaching

Ownership
- Owner: Hammond Broadcasting, Inc.

History
- First air date: June 1981
- Former call signs: WNKR (1981 CP)

Technical information
- Licensing authority: FCC
- Facility ID: 1298
- Class: A
- ERP: 1,350 watts
- HAAT: 212 meters (696 ft)
- Transmitter coordinates: 38.587°N 84.361°W

Links
- Public license information: Public file; LMS

WIOK (107.5 FM) is a commercial radio station licensed to Falmouth, Kentucky, United States, and serving southern Pendleton County, Kentucky. The station plays a southern gospel format with Christian talk and teaching programs. The station is owned and operated by the Hammond Broadcasting, Inc. The station's range covers the corridor between Cincinnati and Lexington, Kentucky.

== History ==
The station signed on the air in June 1981.
