= WCVK =

- Bowling Green, Kentucky; United States
- Broadcast area: Bowling Green
- Frequency: 90.7 MHz
- Branding: Christian Family Radio

Programming
- Format: Christian adult contemporary

Ownership
- Owner: Christian Family Media Ministries, Inc.

History
- First air date: April 23, 1986
- Call sign meaning: We're a Christian Voice in Kentucky

Technical information
- Licensing authority: FCC
- Class: C3
- ERP: 14,000 Watts
- HAAT: 137 meters
- Transmitter coordinates: 37.005°N 86.522°W

Links
- Public license information: Public file; LMS
- Website: christianfamilyradio.com

WCVK (90.7 FM) is a Christian radio station with studios and transmitter located in Bowling Green, Kentucky, United States. The station is the flagship for Christian Family Radio, which currently simulcasts WCVK's programming to WJVK (91.7 FM) in Owensboro, Kentucky and WZVK (89.3 FM) in Glasgow, Kentucky, with plans to expand to other repeater stations in the region.

== History ==
The station went on the air on April 23, 1986. The studios were originally located at 313 State Street in downtown Bowling Green. The station was founded by James Chapman, a local businessman and farmer who still serves as the chairman of the board of directors, with the help of a group of other businesses, churches and local residents. Before going on the air, the station's organizational offices were located at First Assembly of God, two doors down from the station's current studios. Ken Cummins was the director of development before the station went on the air, and the first general manager afterward. Cummins left WCVK to serve on the mission field in Central America at some point in the 1990s.

In 2004, the station's owner, Bowling Green Community Broadcasting, purchased WJVK in Owensboro to convert it into a full-powered repeater of WCVK, broadcasting at 91.7 MHz. Six years later, the station began broadcasting on another satellite station, WZVK of Glasgow, broadcasting at 89.3 MHz.

In 2016, the station marked its 30th anniversary by updating their current studio at 1407 Scottsville Road. In June 2016, Bowling Green Community Broadcasting changed its name to Christian Family Media Ministries, Inc.

The station's format is primarily Christian adult contemporary music, and Christian programming such as Focus on the Family.

== Satellite stations ==
In addition to its main signal, WCVK/Christian Family Radio is simulcast on two additional full-power stations in the Commonwealth:

Call sign	Frequency	City of license	FID	ERP (W)	HAAT	Class	Transmitter coordinates	FCC info	Notes
WJVK	91.7 FM	Owensboro, Kentucky	81648	100	53 m (174 ft)	A	37°44′48.1″N 87°06′57.9″W	LMS	Launched 1990
WZVK	89.3 FM	Glasgow, Kentucky	172311	800	60 m (197 ft)	A	36°57′5.1″N 85°52′42.9″W	LMS	Launched 2010
