= The Daily News (Kentucky) =

Daily newspaper in Bowling Green, Kentucky, United States

Bowling Green Daily News
- Type: Daily newspaper
- Format: Broadsheet
- Owner(s): Carpenter Media Group, LLC
- Publisher: Joe Imel
- Managing editor: Wes Swietek
- Language: English
- Headquarters: 813 College Street, Bowling Green, Kentucky
- Circulation: 19,566 Daily; 23,347 Sunday (as of March 2013)
- Website: bgdailynews.com

The Daily News is a daily newspaper based in Bowling Green, Kentucky. It is published Monday, Wednesday and Saturday.

== History ==
The current newspaper can trace its roots to the Bowling Green Democrat founded in 1854. A rival paper, The Daily Times, was founded by John B. Gaines in 1882 and the newspapers eventually merged into the predecessor to the Park City Daily News; now named the Daily News. The newspaper was still owned by members of the Gaines family until its sale in 2022.

When the paper was called the Park City Daily News, the name was chosen due to a nickname for Bowling Green taken from an 1892 speech by Henry Watterson. Watterson, there to commemorate Fountain Square Park as the city's first park, opined that Bowling Green might come to be known as the "beautiful park city." Local businesses widely adopted the nickname until the town of Glasgow Junction, about 20 miles (32 km) north, changed its name to Park City, Kentucky, and the now-confusing nickname fell from local favor.

The Daily News acquired The Amplifier, a local arts monthly, in 2007.

In 2020, in the face of cuts in advertising revenue that was exacerbated by the COVID-19 pandemic, the Daily News eliminated its Saturday print edition.

After 140 years of local ownership, the Gaines family sold the Daily News to Carpenter Newsmedia, then a subsidiary of Boone Newspapers in Tuscaloosa, Alabama, a family-owned chain of more than 90 papers. The sale took effect on June 30, 2023. The Daily News was the last independent family-owned daily newspaper remaining in Kentucky. On August 23, 2025, the paper announced it will decrease its print days from six to three a week.
