= WLOC =

Radio station in Munfordville, Kentucky, United States

- Munfordville, Kentucky; United States
- Broadcast area: Bowling Green, Kentucky
- Frequency: 1150 kHz
- Branding: Studio 101

Programming
- Format: Variety

Ownership
- Owner: Forbis Communications, Inc.

History
- First air date: June 12, 1956; 70 years ago
- Call sign meaning: "We love our caves"

Technical information
- Licensing authority: FCC
- Facility ID: 58352
- Class: D
- Power: 1,000 watts day 61 watts night
- Transmitter coordinates: 37°16′9″N 85°54′56″W
- Translator: 101.7 W269DD (Munfordville)

Links
- Public license information: Public file; LMS
- Webcast: Listen live
- Website: wloconline.com

WLOC (AM 1150 / FM 101.7 Translator) is a radio station broadcasting a variety format. Licensed to Munfordville, Kentucky, United States, the station is located Horse Cave, Kentucky, USA and serves surrounding cities and counties.

The station is currently owned by Forbis Communications, Inc.

== History ==
The station signed on the air on June 12, 1956, under ownership of South Central Broadcasting Company of Campbellsville. Stock in the station's parent company was sold to then-mayor of Munfordville Jim Berry in 1960; Berry would sign on WLOC-FM (102.3 MHz, now WBGN) four years later.

Following Berry's death in 1992, the station was obtained at auction by South Central Holding Company, and went silent due to financial and legal difficulties. The station was purchased by the South Central Kentucky Broadcasting Company in February 1993.

On July 28, 1998, WLOC was acquired by Hart County Communications, while its FM sister station was acquired by Royse Radio of Glasgow in March of that year. WLOC's current owner, Forbis Communications, acquired the station in December 2003.

In January 2016, Forbis Communications purchased Central City-based low-powered FM translator W278AD from Heartland Ministries. A few months later, that translator, which was relocated to Munfordville, was relaunched as W269DD, to simulcast WLOC's AM radio programming at 101.7 megahertz.

== Notable guests at the station ==
During the early 1990s, southern rock band The Kentucky Headhunters, originally from neighboring Metcalfe County, Kentucky, made regular appearances on WLOC's local talent program, Chittlin' Time. In 1991, the band also recorded a music video for their hit single, Chittlin' Time, at the station's studio.
