= WLXO =

- Mount Sterling, Kentucky; United States
- Broadcast area: Lexington-Fayette
- Frequency: 105.5 MHz
- Branding: 105.5 Hank FM

Programming
- Format: Classic country
- Affiliations: Motor Racing Network

Ownership
- Owner: Charles Cohn; (Clarity Communications, Inc.)

History
- First air date: May 28, 1968
- Former call signs: WMST-FM (1968–2000); WMKJ (2000–2010); WWRW (2010–2021)

Technical information
- Licensing authority: FCC
- Facility ID: 46744
- Class: C3
- ERP: 25,000 watts
- HAAT: 100 meters
- Transmitter coordinates: 38°4′9″N 84°18′44″W

Links
- Public license information: Public file; LMS
- Webcast: Listen live
- Website: www.hankthelegend.com

WLXO (105.5 FM, "105.5 Hank FM") is a radio station with a classic country format. Licensed to Mount Sterling, Kentucky, United States, the station serves the Lexington-Fayette metro area. The station is currently owned by Clarity Communications, Inc.

== History ==
The station was assigned the call letters WMST-FM and signed on May 28, 1968, as an adjunct to WMST (1150 AM). On October 19, 2000, the station changed its call sign to WMKJ with an oldies format known as "Magic 105.5", playing music of the 1960s and 70s.

On May 7, 2010, 105.5 rebranded as "Rewind 105.5" with 1970s and 1980s classic hits. This was not a major musical change for the station, but resulted in the station dropping most of the music of the 1960s, although some remains. The call letters were changed to WWRW, which used to be the call letters of a radio station licensed to Wisconsin Rapids, Wisconsin from 1968 to 1994 (now WGLX).

On March 9, 2020, iHeart sold WWRW to Clarity Communications for $340,000. The sale was consummated on September 3, 2020.

On October 1, 2020, Clarity Communications dropped the classic hits format from WWRW and began broadcasting Christmas music as “Christmas 105.5“. WWRW had been redirecting listeners to WGKS, which had changed to broadcase classic hits on September 22. On December 25 at Noon, WWRW flipped to classic country, assuming the format of WLXO, as "105.5 Hank FM", the two stations simulcasting until WLXO introduces its own format at a later date. The WLXO call sign moved to 105.5 on June 14, 2021.
