= List of television stations in Kentucky =

This is a list of broadcast television stations that are licensed in the U.S. state of Kentucky.

== Full-power ==
- Stations are arranged by media market served and channel position.

Full-power television stations in Kentucky
Media market	Station	Channel	Primary affiliation(s)	Notes	Refs
Bowling Green	WBKO	13	ABC, Fox on 13.2, The CW on 13.3		
Bowling Green	WKYU-TV	24	PBS		
Bowling Green	WNKY	40	NBC, CBS on 40.2		
Bowling Green	WKGB-TV	53	PBS (KET)	(Note: Satellite of WKLE.)	
Lexington	WLEX-TV	18	NBC		
Lexington	WKYT-TV	27	CBS, The CW on 27.2		
Lexington	WTVQ-DT	36	ABC, MyNetworkTV on 36.2		
Lexington	WKMR	38	PBS (KET)	(Note: Licensed to Morehead, Kentucky.)	
Lexington	WKLE	46	PBS (KET)		
Lexington	WKON	52	PBS (KET)	(Note: Licensed to Owenton, Kentucky.)	
Lexington	WDKY-TV	56	Fox	(Note: Licensed to Danville, Kentucky.)	
Lexington	WLJC-TV	65	Cozi TV	(Note: Licensed to Beattyville, Kentucky.)	
Lexington	WUPX-TV	67	Ion Television	(Note: Licensed to Richmond, Kentucky.)	
Louisville	WAVE	3	NBC		
Louisville	WHAS-TV	11	ABC		
Louisville	WKPC-TV	15	PBS (KET)		
Louisville	WBNA	21	Independent		
Louisville	WKZT-TV	23	PBS (KET)	(Note: Licensed to Elizabethtown, Kentucky.)	
Louisville	WLKY	32	CBS		
Louisville	WDRB	41	Fox		
Louisville	WKMJ-TV	68	PBS (KET2)		
Paducah	WPSD-TV	6	NBC		
Paducah	WKMU	21	PBS (KET)	(Note: Licensed to Murray, Kentucky.)	
Paducah	WKPD	29	PBS (KET)		
Paducah	WDKA	49	MyNetworkTV		
Eastern Kentucky Coalfield	WKPI-TV	22	PBS (KET)	(Note: Licensed to Pikeville, Kentucky.)	
Eastern Kentucky Coalfield	WKSO-TV	29	PBS (KET)	(Note: Licensed to Somerset, Kentucky.)	
Eastern Kentucky Coalfield	WKHA	35	PBS (KET)	(Note: Licensed to Hazard, Kentucky.)	
Eastern Kentucky Coalfield	WAGV	44	Religious independent	(Note: Licensed to Harlan, Kentucky.) (Note: Satellite of WLFG.)	
Eastern Kentucky Coalfield	WYMT-TV	57	CBS	(Note: Semi-satellite of WKYT.)	
~Evansville, Indiana	WKOH	31	PBS (KET)	(Note: Licensed to Owensboro, Kentucky.)	
~Evansville, Indiana	WKMA-TV	35	PBS (KET)	(Note: Licensed to Madisonville, Kentucky.)	
~Cincinnati	WXIX-TV	19	Fox	(Note: Licensed to Newport, Kentucky.)	
~Cincinnati	WCVN-TV	54	PBS (KET)	(Note: Licensed to Covington, Kentucky.)	
~Huntington, West Virginia	WKAS	25	PBS (KET)	(Note: Licensed to Ashland, Kentucky.)	
~Huntington, West Virginia	WTSF	61	Daystar		

== Low-power ==
Low-power television stations in Kentucky
Media market	Station	Channel	Network	Notes	Refs
Bowling Green	WDNZ-LD	11	The Country Network	(Note: Licensed to Glasgow, Kentucky.)	
Bowling Green	WKUT-LD	25	Various		
Bowling Green	WQTN-LD	26	Silent		
Bowling Green	WPBM-CD	31	Religious independent	(Note: Licensed to Scottsville, Kentucky.)	
Bowling Green	WBGS-LD	34	Telemundo, ABC on 34.2		
Bowling Green	WNKY-LD	35	Ion Television		
Bowling Green	WCZU-LD	39	Various		
Lexington	WBON-LD	9	Independent		
Louisville	WLCU-CD	4	Educational independent	(Note: Licensed to Campbellsville, Kentucky.)	
Louisville	WMYO-CD	24	Various		
Louisville	WDYL-LD	28	Daystar		
Louisville	WBNM-LD	50	Various		
Eastern Kentucky	WVTN-LD	48	Religious independent		
~Nashville, TN	WCTZ-LD	35	Various	(Note: Licensed to Bowling Green, Kentucky.)	

== Translators ==
Television station translators in Kentucky
Media market	Station	Channel	Translating	Notes	Refs
Paducah	WQWQ-LD	9	KFVS-TV		
~Cincinnati, OH	W16EB-D	38	WKMR	(Note: Licensed to Augusta, Kentucky.)	
~Huntington, WV	W32FD-D	25	WKAS	(Note: Licensed to Louisa, Kentucky.)	

== Defunct ==
- WAZE-TV Madisonville/Evansville, Indiana (1983–2011)
- WBKI-TV Campbellsville (1983–2017)
- WKLO-TV Louisville (1953–1954)

== See also ==
- Kentucky § Media

== Bibliography ==
- "United States TV Stations: Kentucky", Yearbook of Radio and Television, New York: Radio Television Daily, 1964, OCLC 7469377 – via Internet Archive
- Kleber, John E., ed. (1992). "Kentucky Broadcasters Association". Kentucky Encyclopedia. University Press of Kentucky. p. 491. ISBN 0-8131-2883-8.
- Nash, Frances M. (1992). "Broadcasting". In Kleber, John E. (ed.). Kentucky Encyclopedia. University Press of Kentucky. pp. 125–126. ISBN 0-8131-2883-8.
