= Hilltopper Sports Network =

Collegiate sports radio network

- Type: Radio network
- Country: United States
- Availability: Various AM and FM radio stations
- Headquarters: Bowling Green, Kentucky
- Broadcast area: South Central Kentucky; Western Kentucky northwest Middle Tennessee southwest Indiana
- Owner: IMG College; Western Kentucky University
- Official website: WKUSports.com

The Hilltopper Sports Network is the regional sports radio network for the Western Kentucky University's Hilltoppers and Lady Toppers. Headquartered in Bowling Green, Kentucky, the network provides coverage of WKU's athletic teams football, men's and women's basketball. Some select affiliates also clears WKU Men's Baseball games. The network boasts the second-largest radio network in the Commonwealth of Kentucky, behind only their main competitor, the UK Sports Network.

WKYU-TV, the university-owned PBS member station, is the sole television affiliate that broadcasts WKU's televised coaches shows, along with some of WKU's sporting events; this previously included any WKU games that were part of the Conference USA syndication package aired on Stadium and its predecessor, American Sports Network. In addition, some men's and women's basketball games are presented by WKYU with the Fox College Sports cablecast of the game, with the radio network's audio, broadcasting under the branding, "Hilltopper Sports Satellite Network."

== Radio affiliates ==
Hilltopper Sports Satellite Network affiliates
Call sign	Frequency	Band	City	State	Network status
W261BD	100.1	FM	Bowling Green	Kentucky	WKLX relay
WKLX	100.7	FM	Bowling Green	Kentucky	Flagship (men's basketball)
W274BQ	102.7	FM	Bowling Green	Kentucky	WWKU relay
WHHT	103.7	FM	Bowling Green	Kentucky	Flagship (women's basketball)
WPTQ	105.3	FM	Bowling Green	Kentucky	Flagship (football)
WCDS	1230	AM	Bowling Green	Kentucky	Affiliate
WWKU	1450	AM	Bowling Green	Kentucky	Flagship (football, baseball)
WANY-FM	100.9	FM	Albany	Kentucky	Men's basketball only
WBGN	99.1	FM	Beaver Dam	Kentucky	Men's basketball only
WTCO	1450	AM	Campbellsville	Kentucky	Affiliate
WRFM	103.9	FM	Drakesboro	Kentucky	Football only
WIEL	1400	AM	Elizabethtown	Kentucky	Affiliate
WKMO-FM	101.5	FM	Elizabethtown	Kentucky	Affiliate
WEKT	1070	AM	Elkton	Kentucky	Football only
WSON	690	AM	Evansville	Indiana	Affiliate
WFKN	1220	AM	Franklin	Kentucky	Affiliate
WLCB	1430	AM	Hodgenville	Kentucky	Affiliate
WHOP	1230	AM	Hopkinsville	Kentucky	Football only
W237BV	95.3	FM	Hopkinsville	Kentucky	WHOP relay
WJKY	1060	AM	Jamestown	Kentucky	Football only
WJRS	104.9	FM	Jamestown	Kentucky	Affiliate
WNSR	560	AM	Nashville	Tennessee	Football only
W240CA	95.9	FM	Nashville	Tennessee	WNSR relay
W300DO	107.9	FM	Nashville	Tennessee	WNSR relay
WXVW	1450	AM	Louisville	Kentucky	Football only
WTTL	1310	AM	Madisonville	Kentucky	Affiliate
WXCM	97.1	FM	Owensboro	Kentucky	Affiliate
WTLO	1480	AM	Somerset	Kentucky	Football only

=== Former affiliates ===
- Bardstown – WBRT (2005–200?)
- Bowling Green – WBGN (1950?–199?) original flagship station
- Brandenburg – WMMG and WWMG-FM
- Columbia – WAIN (2005–200?)
- Elizabethtown – WQXE (1969–197?)
- Glasgow – WCLU (196?–198?)
- Morgantown – WLBQ (1994–2005)
- Lewisport/Owensboro – WLME
- Princeton – WPKY

== See also ==
- Western Kentucky Hilltoppers and Lady Toppers
- WKYU-TV
- Hilltopper Sports Satellite Network
