= WGGC =

- Bowling Green, Kentucky; United States
- Broadcast area: Bowling Green and surrounding areas
- Frequency: 95.1 MHz
- Branding: Goober 95.1

Programming
- Format: Country
- Affiliations: UK Sports Network; Westwood One

Ownership
- Owner: Skytower Communications; (Heritage Communications, Inc.)
- Sister stations: WLCK, WQXE, WULF, WVLE

History
- First air date: June 23, 1961 (in Glasgow, Kentucky)
- Former call signs: WPRX (1989–1993)
- Call sign meaning: Glasgow's Guy Comer or We're the Giant Goober of Country

Technical information
- Licensing authority: FCC
- Facility ID: 27007
- Class: C0
- Power: 100,000 watts
- HAAT: 967 feet (295 m)
- Transmitter coordinates: 36°54′43″N 86°11′21″W

Links
- Public license information: Public file; LMS
- Webcast: Listen Live
- Website: wggc.com

WGGC (95.1 FM) is a country music–formatted radio station licensed to and located in Bowling Green, Kentucky, United States. The station is owned by Skytower Communications. Its transmitter site is located near Meador, in northern Allen County on Kentucky Route 101 near the Warren/Allen County line. Its studio facility is located at 1727 US 31W Bypass in Bowling Green.

== History ==
=== The early years in Glasgow ===
The station's application history dates back to 1959–60, when the call letters were going to be WKAY-FM to match with parent station WKAY-AM (1490 kHz, now WCLU), but the WGGC call letters were assigned by the FCC in July 1960. Originally licensed to and located in Glasgow, Kentucky, the station first signed on the air on June 23, 1961, under ownership of Glasgow Broadcasting Company, which also owned WKAY. At the time of its inception, WGGC was the first FM radio station ever to sign on in south central Kentucky as all other FM signals heard in this region originated from either Nashville, Louisville, Central City, or Owensboro. Both WGGC and WKAY shared studios at 510 Happy Valley Road (Kentucky Route 351, now Kentucky Route 90) in Glasgow; that facility was demolished in November 2014 to make room for a new drug store. Clovis and Moena Sadler, who had been managing WKAY since 1948, purchased WGGC and WKAY in 1971. During the first two decades of WGGC's existence, the station began as an almost-full-time simulcast of WKAY until sometime in the late 1960s, when WGGC became a separate entity.

=== Formats over the years ===
Shortly before 1970, the station was broadcasting a religious format, and later a gospel music format, and eventually switching to their current country music format by 1974, thereby becoming one of the first country music stations on the FM dial in southern Kentucky.

=== Signal upgrade and new transmitter site ===
By 1985, WGGC's signal was upgraded to operate with 100,000 watts of effective radiated power. In 1988, the station's signal origination was moved to its present transmitting site in Allen County. At one point in 1989, the station's callsign was changed to WPRX, but reverted to the WGGC callsign sometime in 1992, and until 2002, it was known on air as "Country 95."

=== Changes of ownership ===
From 1988 through the mid-1990s, WCLU-AM and WCLU-FM (102.3 MHz, now WBGN) was under ownership of Royse Radio, Inc. WGGC, meanwhile, remained under ownership by Moena Sadler. In 1994, the station was leased to Bill Evans of Elizabethtown-based Hot AC station WQXE to operate WGGC, and was eventually sold to WQXE's parent company, Heritage Communications, Inc., in October 1997. In August 2000, WGGC began audio streaming their signal over the internet through its website, becoming one of the first radio stations in Kentucky to do so.

=== Relocation to Bowling Green ===
In 1996, WGGC moved its broadcasting facilities to its current location in Bowling Green; the station's broadcasting license would also relocate to Bowling Green in 2002. From then until 2010, the station was branded as "95.1 WGGC." It began branding itself as "Dolby Digital 95.1" in late 2010 before using its current "Goober 95.1" branding in 2011.

=== Community service ===
WGGC has often been involved in community service; most recently in June 2014, when the station, in conjunction with the southern Kentucky chapter of United Way, hosted a radio-thon to raise money for the late country music superstar Dolly Parton's Imagination Library. It became an annual event beginning in 2015. On February 4, 2020, WGGC was awarded the United Way Media Partner Advocacy Award, for its "United Way Wednesdays" segments in 2019, on Big Rick In The Morning.

=== December 2021 tornado ===
In the wee hours of December 11, 2021, WGGC was one of a handful of local radio and television outlets in Bowling Green that were knocked off the air due to an EF3 tornado that impacted portions of the city. WGGC's studio was within the path of the tornado when it struck the corridor along the U.S. 31W Bypass near downtown Bowling Green; the tornado produced substantial damage at the studio and offices, as well as nearby restaurants, stores and other businesses. The station returned to the air several days later following the efforts to clean the damage at the studio.

== Programming and format ==
WGGC broadcasts a country music format, therefore competing with three other country formatted stations in the same market: WBVR-FM (FM 96.7), Cave City-licensed WHHT (FM 103.7), and Glasgow-based WLYE-FM (FM 94.1) for ratings. WGGC also competes with out-of-market country stations like WSM-AM, WSM-FM, WKDF and WSIX-FM in Nashville, along with WBKR in Owensboro for the allegiances of the local listener due to Bowling Green's close proximity to both nearby cities, where listeners can pick up at least Grade B quality signal of the station thanks to WGGC's 100,000 watts of power and its tower height of 967 feet (295 m), thereby covering many areas in west-central Kentucky, northern middle Tennessee, and a small sliver of southwestern Indiana.

WGGC hosts include: Krysta; and Greg Almond. Syndicated shows from Westwood One include The Big Time with Whitney Allen and The Lia Show.

In addition to country music, WGGC is the area's longtime home for Kentucky Wildcats football and men's basketball games from the UK Sports Network by JMI Sports.

== Nominations and awards ==
In 2020, former morning host "Big Rick" Daniels was nominated for the 55th Academy of Country Music Awards for On-Air Personality of the Year – Small Market., and for the 54th Country Music Association Awards for Small Market Personality of the Year.
