= WBVR (AM) =

Radio station in Bowling Green, Kentucky

Simulcast of WBVR-FM, Horse Cave
- Bowling Green, Kentucky; United States
- Broadcast area: Bowling Green metropolitan area; Northern Nashville, Tennessee
- Frequency: 1340 kHz
- Branding: Beaver 106.3

Programming
- Format: Country
- Affiliations: Nashville Predators Radio Network; U of L Sports Network

Ownership
- Owner: Seven Mountains Media; (Southern Belle Media Family, LLC)
- Sister stations: W240CP; WBVR-FM; WOVO; WPTQ; WUHU; WKLX

History
- First air date: November 24, 1959
- Former call signs: WBGN (1959–2025)
- Call sign meaning: Beaver

Technical information
- Licensing authority: FCC
- Facility ID: 27243
- Class: C
- Power: 1,000 watts unlimited
- Transmitter coordinates: 37°0′34″N 86°27′9″W
- Translator: 94.5 W233CZ (Bowling Green)

Links
- Public license information: Public file; LMS
- Webcast: Listen live
- Website: beaverfm.com

WBVR (1340 kHz) is a country music formatted radio station licensed to Bowling Green, Kentucky, United States and is owned by Seven Mountains Media. The station's studios are on Scottsville Road in southern Bowling Green, and its transmitter is located off Church Avenue in the northern part of the city. WBVR simulcasts the programming of Horse Cave–licensed WBVR-FM (106.3 FM).

To complement its AM signal, WBVR operates an FM translator station on 94.5 FM under the callsign W233CZ. That station's transmitter is shared with the AM signal.

The station went on the air in 1959 as WBGN. It broadcast rock, country, top 40, oldies, and sports formats at various points in its history. In 2025, after being acquired by Seven Mountains Media, it became WBVR and began simulcasting WBVR-FM.

== History ==
=== Early days as WBGN ===
The station's construction permit, which was initially filed in July 1958, was granted by the Federal Communications Commission (FCC) on May 18, 1959, and WBGN first signed on the air on November 24 of that same year as the third radio station in Bowling Green. The FCC granted the official license on May 31, 1960. It was originally owned by J. Paul Brown and Robert L. Proctor, doing business as Bowling Green Broadcasting Company. The station broadcast originally broadcast a rock format, then it began broadcasting a country format, but switched to a Top 40/CHR format. From 1964 until 1982, WBGN was the original flagship station of Western Kentucky Hilltoppers football and basketball games of the Hilltopper Sports Radio Network, with Wes Strader and Bud Tyler (originally from WLBJ) making the play-by-play commentary on those broadcasts. This included the basketball team's appearance in the 1971 NCAA Final Four.

=== Ownership and format changes ===
WBGN's format changed from Top 40/CHR to oldies in 1985. In April 1988, WBGN was purchased by Hilltopper Broadcasting, another locally based radio broadcasting firm, which at the time owned Smiths Grove-licensed WBLG-FM (now WUHU), and switched back to a country music format. However, the station switched back to oldies in 1990, this time broadcasting the music from a satellite service called "The Oldies Channel". This format lasted until Forever Communications purchased the station, and converted it into a sports radio station by affiliating WBGN with ESPN Radio.

=== As a Fox Sports Radio affiliate ===
The station affiliated with Fox Sports Radio after WWKU and WCDS became the ESPN Radio affiliates.

In December 2016, WBGN launched low-powered FM repeater W300DA, broadcasting at 107.9 MHz, to bring WBGN's programming to the FM dial. In February 2017, WBGN's Fox Sports Radio affiliation ended when both it and W300DA became a simulcast of Glasgow-based WLYE-FM, a classic country music station in the area.

=== Return to oldies ===
In December 2019, WBGN's simulcasting with WLYE was replaced with Christmas music. On December 30, 2019, the station flipped to oldies as "AM 1340 & 107.9 FM WBGN".

=== Seven Mountains Media ownership (2023–present) ===
In September 2023, it was announced that Seven Mountains Media would acquire the Forever Communications stations in the Bowling Green area (including this one) for just over $1.1 million. On January 10, 2025, the station changed its call sign to WBVR and began simulcasting the country music programming of WBVR-FM. The station also reallocated it's FM translator to broadcast at 94.5 megahertz, and the call letters of the translator became W233CZ. As of December 2025, the WBGN call sign now resides on an unrelated station licensed in Munfordville, Kentucky.

== Programming ==
WBGN's simulcast with WLYE was not full-time. WBGN still retains the rights to certain sporting events. It is also the local affiliate for the U of L Sports Network broadcasting Louisville Cardinals football and basketball, as well as the National Hockey League's Nashville Predators games from the Nashville Predators Radio Network. The station was Kentucky Sports Radio's Bowling Green affiliate until January 2019, when the program moved to WKCT.

Until the end of the 2021 season, WBGN was also the official local broadcaster for Bowling Green Hot Rods baseball. Those broadcasts moved to WKCT beginning with the 2022 season.
