= WOVO =

WOVO may refer to:

- WOVO (FM), a radio station (96.7 FM) licensed to Auburn, Kentucky, United States
- WBVR (FM), a radio station (106.3 FM) licensed to serve Horse Cave, Kentucky, which held the call sign WOVO from 2012 to 2025
- WPTQ, a radio station (105.3 FM) licensed to Glasgow, Kentucky, which held the call sign WOVO from 1972 to 1991 and 1996 to 2012
