= WKMO =

WKMO may refer to:

- WKMO-FM, a radio station (101.5 FM) licensed to serve Vine Grove, Kentucky, United States
- WLEZ (FM), a radio station (99.3 FM) licensed to serve Lebanon Junction, Kentucky, which held the call sign WKMO from 2008 to 2022
- WRZI, a radio station (107.3 FM) licensed to serve Hodgenville, Kentucky, which held the call sign WKMO from 1977 to 2008
