= Ross Becker =

American journalist

- Status: Married
- Occupation: Broadcast journalist (1975-present)

Ross Becker is a journalist working in television, radio, and digital. He is the president and CEO of TvNewsmentor.com, a company intended to grow talent. He is also a founding partner of Top News Talent, a coaching, training and representation company for broadcast, and digital journalists.

== Career ==
Becker began his career in broadcasting in 1975 as a reporter (Ross Buchberger) at WFRV-TV in Green Bay, Wisconsin, before moving in 1977 to WTHR-TV in Indianapolis (Ross Becker) as a weekend anchor and field reporter. He then moved to KCBS-TV (then-known as KNXT) in Los Angeles in 1980 as a reporter, eventually becoming head of the Investigative Team and weekend anchor, as well as a host of a short-lived 7 p.m. newscast. He received three Emmys for coverage of the Cerritos plane crash and Southern California windstorms. He also received six Golden Mike Awards and the AP Mark Twain Award for news writing. During his tenure at KCBS, he was for two years president of the Radio/TV News Association of Southern California. In 1990, Becker moved on to KCOP-TV to anchor the station's newscast, replacing Warren Olney IV. At KCOP, he received an Emmy Award for coverage of the Reginald Oliver Denny beating, which started the L.A. area riots.

In 1995, Becker left KCOP, complaining about "sold-out, disgusting, tabloid" journalism in Los Angeles. In January 1996, Becker was hired as a freelance journalist and conducted a 90-minute interview with O. J. Simpson. It was the first interview with Simpson following his acquittal on murder charges. The interview was controversial at the time because its videotape got distributed for sale instead of airing on "free" television or cable. During the interview, Becker agreed not to ask about Simpson's children, finances, or the then-pending civil lawsuit. However, Becker disclosed this at the beginning of the interview and ultimately questioned him about those subjects. In the video, Simpson blamed people "in Faye Resnick's circle" for the murder and accused Mark Fuhrman of planting evidence related to Simpson's guilt. Many television stations and the National Enquirer, which printed many details about the trial, refused to carry advertising for the taped video.

In 1995, Becker and his wife, Linda, purchased three radio stations in Kentucky: WIEL-AM Elizabethtown, WKMO in Hodgenville, Kentucky, and WRZI-FM in Vine Grove, Kentucky. These got sold to Commonwealth Broadcasting in 2000, and Becker accepted a position as a reporter and anchor for MSNBC in 2001. The following year, he returned to local news when he joined KTNV-TV in Las Vegas as its evening anchor. Becker left KTNV in December 2004 to pursue other opportunities. He returned to Los Angeles in 2005 as a freelance reporter for KNBC before being hired full-time. He left KNBC at the end of 2006 to join KTVX-TV in Salt Lake City, Utah, as the main evening anchor. He left the station on December 31, 2009, and joined KUSI-TV in San Diego. At KUSI, he was a featured reporter and co-anchor of the 11 p.m. newscast. At the end of 2016, Becker left KUSI to become the news director for KMIR-TV in Palm Springs, California. Becker left KMIR in January 2018. He became the lead anchor for KAAL in Rochester, Minnesota, in January 2019, before announcing his departure in August 2021.

Becker is the past president of the board of directors of APTRA, the Associated Press TV and Radio Association, which serves 12 western states as a liaison with the Associated Press.

== Books ==
- What You Saw and What You Didn't The Stories Behind 50 years of Broadcast Journalism (2024)
- Unexpected Exclusive: The Inside Story of the Interview with O.J. Simpson After his Acquittal on Murder Charges
