= WCLU =

WCLU may refer to:

- WCLU (AM), a radio station (1490 AM) licensed to serve Glasgow, Kentucky, United States
- West Central Labor Union
- WBGN (FM), a radio station (102.3 FM) licensed to serve Munfordville, Kentucky, which held the call sign WCLU-FM from 1998 to 2021
