= WLYE-FM =

Radio station in Glasgow, Kentucky

- Glasgow, Kentucky; United States
- Broadcast area: Bowling Green metropolitan area
- Frequency: 94.1 MHz
- Branding: Big Willie 94.1

Programming
- Format: Classic country
- Affiliations: Fox News Radio

Ownership
- Owner: Commonwealth Broadcasting; (Newberry Broadcasting, Inc.)
- Sister stations: W239BT, WBGN, WCDS, WCLU, WHHT, WKLX, WWZG

History
- First air date: 1997 (as WGBV)
- Former call signs: WGBV (1995–2003)
- Call sign meaning: "Willie"

Technical information
- Licensing authority: FCC
- Facility ID: 57897
- Class: A
- ERP: 4,500 watts
- HAAT: 91 meters (299 ft)
- Transmitter coordinates: 36°59′2″N 85°52′20″W

Links
- Public license information: Public file; LMS
- Webcast: Listen Live
- Website: WLYE website

WLYE-FM (94.1 MHz) is a radio station broadcasting a classic country format. Licensed to Glasgow, Kentucky, United States, the station serves the Bowling Green metropolitan area. The station is currently owned by Commonwealth Broadcasting, and features programming from Fox News Radio.

The station's studios and offices are located at 902 West Main Street in downtown Glasgow. WLYE's transmitter is located on the southeastern outskirts of the city off Kentucky Route 90.

== History ==
=== Construction permit ===
Following the 1988 purchase of WCLU by Royse Radio, Inc. (Henry Royse II, owner), intentions to launch an FM companion station for the locally based AM station were in place. The station was assigned the call letters WGBV on January 4, 1995, when the FCC first granted the construction permit for the frequency of 94.1 MHz.

=== WBVR simulcast as WGBV ===
The station signed on in 1997 as a full-time satellite station of Bowling Green-based WBVR-FM (96.7 MHz, now WOVO).

=== Willie 94.1 ===
In January 2002, Forever Communications Inc. (Carol Logan, president) reached an agreement to purchase the station from Royse Radio for a reported sale price of $416,412. After the sale was finalized, on September 3, 2003, the call letters were changed to the current WLYE. From that day on, the station has been broadcasting a classic country format, billing itself as Real Country Willie 94.1.

Along with its classic country format, WLYE was also the official broadcaster of Edmonson County High School football and boys' and girls' basketball games from the 2003–2004 season until 2014. The rights to those games became Internet-exclusive upon that year's launch of EdmonsonVoice.com, an online-based news website specifically catering to the Brownsville and Edmonson County area.

=== Expansion of the Willie branding ===
From February 2017 until December 2019, WLYE's programming began to be simulcast over the original WBGN (1340 AM, now WBVR) and its associated translator W300DA (107.9 FM), both of Bowling Green. WBGN has since switched to an oldies format, but still retained their status as the Bowling Green Hot Rods' official broadcaster (until WKCT won the rights in 2021) and its affiliation with the Nashville Predators Radio Network. In February 2022, the station's programming began simulcasting over 102.3 MHz via WLLI (formerly WCLU-FM, now WBGN) in Munfordville; that simulcast has ended in November 2025.

=== Sale to Seven Mountains Media, and currently Commonwealth Broadcasting ===
In September 2023, this station, along with three others were acquired by Seven Mountains Media from Forever Communications. Then in October 2024, Seven Mountains announced that they and Commonwealth Broadcasting agreed to swap stations with some of the Bowling Green area, including WLYE.

== Programming ==
Since 2003, WLYE broadcasts a classic country format. The station also airs The Real Trader program weekday mornings at around 8:30 am CT. The Real Trader is a weekday program devoted to people selling items in classified ads. The station also broadcasts hourly national news updates from Fox News Radio, and local weather updates are provided by NBC/CBS/MeTV television affiliate WNKY (channel 40).
