= WDNS =

- Bowling Green, Kentucky; United States
- Broadcast area: Bowling Green, Kentucky
- Frequency: 93.3 MHz
- Branding: D93

Programming
- Format: Classic rock
- Affiliations: United Stations Radio Network; Westwood One

Ownership
- Owner: Daily News Broadcasting Company
- Sister stations: WKCT

History
- First air date: March 14, 1973
- Former frequencies: 98.3 MHz (1973–1995)
- Call sign meaning: Daily News (former sister newspaper)

Technical information
- Licensing authority: FCC
- Facility ID: 15258
- Class: C3
- ERP: 12,000 watts
- HAAT: 144 metres (472 ft)
- Transmitter coordinates: 36°56′39″N 86°15′11″W

Links
- Public license information: Public file; LMS
- Webcast: Listen Live
- Website: wdnsfm.com

WDNS (93.3 FM) is a classic rock-formatted radio station licensed to, located in, and serving Bowling Green, Kentucky. The station is owned by the Daily News Broadcasting Company as part of a duopoly with News Talk Information station WKCT (930 AM). Both stations share studios on College Street in downtown Bowling Green, and its transmitter is located along Iron Bridge Road adjacent to the Barren River southeast of the city.

== History ==
The station began broadcasting at 98.3 MHz on March 14, 1973. At the time, it was broadcasting a beautiful music format until switching to an Adult contemporary format in the early 1980s. At the time, the station was originally branded as D-98.

In 1989, the station switched to an album-oriented rock format. The classic rock format came to the station in 1991, and the station has been broadcasting that format ever since.

In 1995, Hot AC-formatted station WQXE in Elizabethtown requested to move to 98.3 MHz. In response, WDNS moved to its current 93.3 MHz frequency in order to avoid signal interference with The 98.3 frequency was not used in the Bowling Green area again until 2014, when low-powered translator station W252CV was signed on by in-market rock radio rival WPTQ to simulcast that station's HD2 subchannel for the benefit of listeners who do not own a HD Radio set.

== Programming ==
WDNS broadcasts classic rock music released from the 1970s to the 1990s. In addition to locally–hosted weekday shows, the station also provides syndicated programming from Westwood One, providing Steve Gorman Rocks!, and the United Stations Radio Network, including Nights with Alice Cooper.

In August 2016, WDNS has entered a two-year agreement to broadcast high school football games involving the Bowling Green Purples, which won their fifth KHSAA Division I-AA state championship. The deal includes broadcast of every BGHS Purples game in the 2016 and 2017 seasons. This made WDNS the only FM radio station in the Bowling Green area to broadcast high school football involving a Warren County-based high school team. The first BGHS game broadcast by WDNS was against the John Hardin High School football team at the Rafferty's Bowl at Western Kentucky University's L.T. Smith Stadium on August 20, 2016.

In addition, in 2022, WDNS began broadcasting the games of the National Football League's Cincinnati Bengals through the Bengals Radio Network.
