= U of L Sports Network =

Collegiate sports radio network

- Type: Radio network
- Country: United States
- Availability: Various AM/FM stations
- Headquarters: Louisville, Kentucky
- Broadcast area: Kentucky; Southern Indiana (limited); Southwest Ohio (limited)
- Owner: Learfield Sports; University of Louisville
- Official website: uoflsports.com

The U of L Sports Network is the radio network of the University of Louisville Cardinals. It consists of fifteen (15) radio stations in primarily located in Kentucky, but the network serves much of Kentucky and southern Indiana.

== On-air personalities ==
- Paul Rogers (Play-by-play commentator (men's basketball and Louisville Cardinals football))
- Bob Valvano (Color analyst (men's basketball))
- Jody Demling (Sideline reporter (football))
- Craig Swabek (Color analyst,(football))
- Nick Curran (Play-by-play commentator (Women's basketball)

== Affiliates ==
Callsign	Frequency	Band	City	State	Network status	Notes
WHAS	840	AM	Louisville	Kentucky	Flagship	(Note: Airs any games that do not conflict with University of Kentucky Wildcats games from the UK Sports Network.)
WKRD	790	AM	Louisville	Kentucky	Flagship	(Note: Alternate affiliate for Louisville men's basketball and football when schedules on WHAS conflict with Kentucky Wildcats men's basketball and football.)
WCCK	95.7	FM	Calvert City/Gilbertsville	Kentucky	Affiliate	
WLVK	105.5	FM	Fort Knox/Elizabethtown	Kentucky	Affiliate	
WHLN	1410	AM	Harlan	Kentucky	Affiliate	
WXLR	104.9	FM	Harold/Pikeville	Kentucky	Affiliate	
WKDO	98.7	FM	Liberty	Kentucky	Affiliate	
WYMC	1430	AM	Mayfield	Kentucky	Affiliate	
W230BN	93.9	FM	Mayfield	Kentucky	WYMC relay	
WLRS	1570	AM	New Albany	Indiana	Baseball only	
WVKY	101.7	FM	Shelbyville	Kentucky	Women's basketball only	
WZNN	96.1	FM	Stamping Ground/Lexington	Kentucky	Affiliate	
WPAD	1560	AM	Paducah	Kentucky	Affiliate	
W258AN	99.5	FM	Paducah	Kentucky	WPAD relay	
WSFC	1240	AM	Somerset	Kentucky	Affiliate	
WCKY	1530	AM	Cincinnati	Ohio	Affiliate	
WSAI	1360	AM	Cincinnati	Ohio	Women's basketball flagship	

U of L Sports Network broadcasts can also be heard via Sirius XM Radio.

== See also ==
- UK Sports Network—radio network of the Kentucky Wildcats
- Hilltopper IMG Sports Network—radio network of the Western Kentucky Hilltoppers
- Vol Network—radio network of the Tennessee Volunteers
