= WWZG =

Simulcasting WHHT-HD3 Cave City
- Park City, Kentucky; United States
- Broadcast area: Glasgow, Kentucky
- Frequency: 92.1 MHz
- Branding: Zing 106.7 & 92.1

Programming
- Format: Hot adult contemporary

Ownership
- Owner: Commonwealth Broadcasting; (Steven W. Newberry)
- Sister stations: WBGN, WCLU, WLYE-FM, WHHT,

History
- First air date: November 15, 1971 (in Tompkinsville, Kentucky)
- Former call signs: WTKY-FM (1971–2026)

Technical information
- Licensing authority: FCC
- Facility ID: 72293
- Class: A
- ERP: 4,900 watts
- HAAT: 111 meters (364 ft)
- Transmitter coordinates: 37°10′40″N 85°55′12″W

Links
- Public license information: Public file; LMS
- Webcast: Listen live
- Website: zingfm.com

WWZG (92.1 MHz) is a hot adult contemporary radio station. Licensed to Park City, Kentucky, United States, the station is owned by Commonwealth Broadcasting, presided by licensee Steven W. Newberry. The station is a simulcast of the HD3 subchannel of Cave City–licensed WHHT (103.7 FM) and translator station W294DB (106.7 FM). The station's studios, shared with sister stations WBGN, WCLU, WLYE-FM, and WWHT, are located at the Commerce Plaza Building on the Public Square in downtown Glasgow. WWZG's transmitter is located in Horse Cave, Kentucky.

== History ==
=== The Tompkinsville years as the original WTKY-FM ===
Originally licensed to and based in Tompkinsville, Kentucky, the station began on November 15, 1971, as WTKY-FM, the FM counterpart of WTKY (1370 AM). It was owned by J. E. Whittimore. The Whittimores sold WTKY-AM-FM in 1982 to Ministers' Broadcasting Corporation; at the time, the FM aired a top 40 format. The nine investors spent $450,000 to buy the stations but sold them back to Whittimore in 1984 for the release of some $400,000 in debt.

In December 2015, WTKY-AM-FM, along with WKWY (102.7 FM) and Celina, Tennessee–based WVFB (101.5 FM) were purchased by Frank Keeton Aircasters from the estate of Bernice Whittimore for $400,000.

In 2025, Steven Newberry acquired WTKY-FM for $65,000. Newberry owns four stations in Glasgow. The call sign was changed to WWZG in May 2026, and the station went silent at that time; the WTKY-FM callsign was reassigned to the former WKWY.

=== Relaunch in the Caveland area ===
On November 5, 2026, WWZG's broadcast license was relocated from Tompkinsville to Park City, and returned to the air with a simulcast of hot adult contemporary-formatted WHHT-HD3, branded as "Zing 106.7 & 92.1".
