= WTKY =

- Tompkinsville, Kentucky; United States
- Frequency: 1370 kHz
- Branding: Kix Country

Programming
- Format: Country

Ownership
- Owner: Jonathan Keeton; (Frank Keeton Aircasters, Inc.)
- Sister stations: WTKY-FM; WVFB

History
- First air date: 1960
- Call sign meaning: Tompkinsville, Kentucky

Technical information
- Licensing authority: FCC
- Facility ID: 72294
- Class: D
- Power: 2,100 watts daytime
- Transmitter coordinates: 36°43′27.2″N 85°40′52.9″W

Links
- Public license information: Public file; LMS

WTKY (1370 AM) is a radio station broadcasting a country format in Tompkinsville, Kentucky, United States. It is currently owned by Jonathan Keeton, through licensee Frank Keeton Aircasters, Inc. It broadcasts from studios, shared with sister station WTKY-FM (102.7 MHz), located at 341 Radio Station Road (KY 1049) just east of Tompkinsville, where the transmitter is also located.

== History ==
WTKY began broadcasting at 1370 kilohertz in 1960 under ownership of WMCV. Inc., which would sell the station for $20,000 to J.K. and Bernice Whittimore in 1970. The following year, its FM companion station, WTKY-FM began operations at 92.1 megahertz. The Whittimore couple would operate the stations for six years until they automated the stations from 1976 until 1982. Country music was on the AM station, while the FM counterpart aired an easy listening format. The Whittimores sold the stations to Ministers Broadcasting Corporation in 1982, but reversed the sale two years later. In 1984, the Whittimores also purchased WVFB (101.5 FM) in nearby Celina, Tennessee.

In December 2015, WTKY-AM-FM, WKWY and WVFB were purchased by Frank Keeton Aircasters from the estate of Bernice Whittimore for $400,000. The original WTKY-FM was sold in November 2025, with what had been WKWY becoming the new WTKY-FM (102.7 FM).

== Programming ==
In addition to its country music format, WTKY is also home to coverage of football and basketball games of Monroe County High School. WTKY, along with WVFB, are also the official stations for worship services of the Tompkinsville Church of Christ.
