= W248CF =

- Bowling Green, Kentucky; United States
- Broadcast area: Bowling Green
- Frequency: 97.5 MHz
- Branding: WKU Classical Radio

Programming
- Format: Classical
- Affiliations: WFMT Radio Network

Ownership
- Owner: Western Kentucky University
- Sister stations: Radio: WKYU-FM, WWHR; TV: WKYU-TV

History
- First air date: March 2016 (Signal testing); April 2016 (official launch)

Technical information
- Licensing authority: FCC
- Facility ID: 142552
- Class: D (FM translator)
- ERP: 250 watts
- Transmitter coordinates: 36°57′37″N 86°32′49″W
- Repeater: WBVR-FM-HD3 106.3-3 Horse Cave/Bowling Green

Links
- Public license information: Public file; LMS
- Website: WKYU-FM Website

W248CF is an FM translator-style radio station that is licensed to and serving Bowling Green, Kentucky. The station is owned and operated by Western Kentucky University. Although Radio-Locator.com lists is a repeater station of WKYU-FM, W248CF is actually broadcasting a Classical music format as a new local service of WKU Public Radio.

As part of an arrangement with Horse Cave-licensed WBVR-FM, W248CF is also simulcast on that station's HD Radio signal on its third subchannel.

== History ==
Although test broadcasts began in March 2016, the official launch of the station took place in the second week of April 2016. The official license was granted by the Federal Communications Commission on March 21, 2016.

== Programming ==
Music played on W248CF includes symphonies, including those of the New York Philharmonic, the Dallas and Chicago Symphonies, and the Metropolitan Opera. Content is provided through The Public Radio Exchange. The station is also the area's local affiliate of the WFMT Radio Network.
