= WLLI =

WLLI may refer to:

- WBGN (FM), a radio station (102.3 FM) licensed to serve Munfordville, Kentucky, United States, which held the call sign WLLI from 2022 to 2025
- WTJF (AM), a radio station (1390 AM) licensed to serve Jackson, Tennessee, United States, which held the call sign WLLI from 2017 to 2020
- WTJF-FM, a radio station (94.3 FM) licensed to serve Dyer, Tennessee, which held the call sign WLLI-FM from 2007 to 2008 and from 2017 to 2019
- WGGI (AM), a radio station (990 AM) licensed to serve Somerset, Pennsylvania, United States, which held the call sign WLLI from 2013 to 2017
- WHUN (AM), a radio station (1150 AM) licensed to serve Huntingdon, Pennsylvania, which held the call sign WLLI from 2010 to 2013
- WSSR, a radio station (96.7 FM) licensed to serve Joliet, Illinois, United States, which held the call sign WLLI-FM from 1974 to 2004
