= Hilltopper Sports Satellite Network =

Ad hoc seasonal syndicated sports network

- Type: Digital broadcast television network/syndication service
- Country: United States
- Availability: Bowling Green, Kentucky and Louisville, Kentucky media markets
- Owner: Western Kentucky University
- Launch date: December 10, 1993 (as Hilltoppers Television Network)
- Picture format: SDTV 480i (1994–2015); HDTV 1080i (2015–present)
- Official website: www.wkusports.com

The Hilltopper Sports Satellite Network (HSSN) is a viewer-supported, student-run, and seasonal syndicated programming service based in Bowling Green, Kentucky. It features live broadcasts of men's and women's college basketball events of the Western Kentucky Hilltoppers, the sporting team representing Western Kentucky University. The institution is currently a member of Conference USA.

== History ==
Founded in 1993 as the Hilltopper Television Network, games broadcast over the network were broadcast over the university's PBS member station WKYU-TV, and fed via satellite to WBNA-TV in Louisville, W43AG (later WKAG-CA) in Hopkinsville, and two other television stations, and onto public access channels of two cable systems in central and northern Kentucky. The network's first telecast was the Lady Toppers' home game against the Kentucky Wildcats.

The network was renamed as the Hilltopper Sports Satellite Network (HSSN) in late 2000. The HSSN, who works through a partnership with Western Kentucky University, the WKU Athletic Department, and WKYU-TV, has helped the Hilltoppers make over 150 television appearances since 2010. While WKYU-TV serves as the flagship station, Louisville-based independent station WBNA (formerly an Ion Television affiliate) serves as an affiliate to make WKU Basketball games available in the Louisville metropolitan area.

While a member of the Sun Belt Conference prior to the 2014–15 season, some WKU Basketball games aired on WKYU-TV were syndicated by Creative Sports (later ESPN Regional Television) during the 1990s and 2000s. Sometimes, during the 1990s and 2000s, the HSSN package competed with Jefferson Pilot/Lincoln Financial Media (now Raycom Sports) broadcasts of Southeastern Conference sporting events and ESPN Plus-operated SEC TV on ABC affiliate WBKO, which, prior to WKYU-TV's 1989 sign-on, previously broadcast select WKU road games on a tape-delayed basis alongside the live syndicated SEC games before the network was formed. WBKO was still in a joint venture with WKYU, delivering tape delayed games when the network was formed.

== Game broadcasts ==
The HSSN's basketball broadcasts are mainly an audio simulcast of game broadcasts of the Hilltoppers Sports Radio Network, with the live video being simulcast from the ESPN+ streaming service, Fox College Sports, who broadcast most of WKU's games nationally via satellite and/or cable television, some of which most major cable and satellite providers offered as part of an out-of-market sports package, was the previous regional broadcaster for select WKU games until the end of the 2017–18 season.

WKYU-TV programs HSSN broadcasts of WKU basketball from early December to early March. Historically, the HSSN broadcast package mostly Western Kentucky Hilltoppers men's basketball games, but its season package often included some women's basketball games as well. In 2015, the HSSN purchased a $2 million fully-high-definition mobile production facility, making the game broadcasts available in full 16:9 high definition. From 2014 until 2023, WKYU-TV also broadcast games involving the WKU Hilltoppers that were broadcast by the American Sports Network and its successor, Stadium, an ad hoc syndication service owned and operated by Sinclair Broadcasting Group, which owns Nashville Fox affiliate WZTV and MyNetworkTV affiliate WUXP-TV, that can be received over-the-air in Bowling Green.

== Affiliates ==
=== Current ===
| DMA | Station | Channel (RF) | Affiliation | Notes |
|---|---|---|---|---|
| Bowling Green | WKYU-TV | 24.1 (18.1) | PBS | Flagship station of HSSN; also has cable coverage in the north-central fringes of the Nashville, Tennessee market. See WKYU-TV article for more information. |
| Louisville | WBNA | 21.1 (8.1) | Independent | |

=== Former ===
| DMA | Station | Channel (RF) | Years of affiliation | Notes |
|---|---|---|---|---|
| Hopkinsville | WKAG-CA | 43 | 1993–2009? | Defunct as of 2011 |
| Campbellsville, Kentucky | WGRB | 34 | 1993–1999? | Later WBKI-TV, now defunct as of 2017 |
| Goldvein, Virginia | WNVT | 53 | 1993–199? | Charter affiliate; now licensed to Spotsylvania Courthouse, Virginia |
| East Bernstadt/London, Kentucky | WOBZ-LD | 9 | 2000–2010? | Now Richmond, Kentucky-licensed WBON-LD |
| Evansville, Indiana | W63BT | 63 | 1993–1997? | |
| Louisville | W50CI-D | 8.1 (50.1) | 2013–2017 | Was a LPTV translator of WBNA until it became a Buzzr affiliate in March 2017. |
| Louisville | W24BW | 24 | 2000–200? | Replaced by WBNA |
| Owensboro | OCTV-71 | Cable 71 | 2000–200? | |
| Southeastern United States | Comcast Sports Southeast | Various | 2000–2004? | |
| Eastern United States | FCS Atlantic | Various | 2008?–2017 | |

== Funding and Sponsorship ==
Because HSSN flagship WKYU-TV is a viewer-supported television station, the HSSN was mainly funded by local merchants who are supporters of the sports teams of WKU, as well as some WKU Hilltopper fans that view the games via television, especially those who live within the Bowling Green media market.

== Sponsors ==
- Houchens Industries
- Prairie Farms
- Minit Mart Foods Inc.

== See also ==
- WKYU-TV
- Hilltopper Sports Network
