= WLCK =

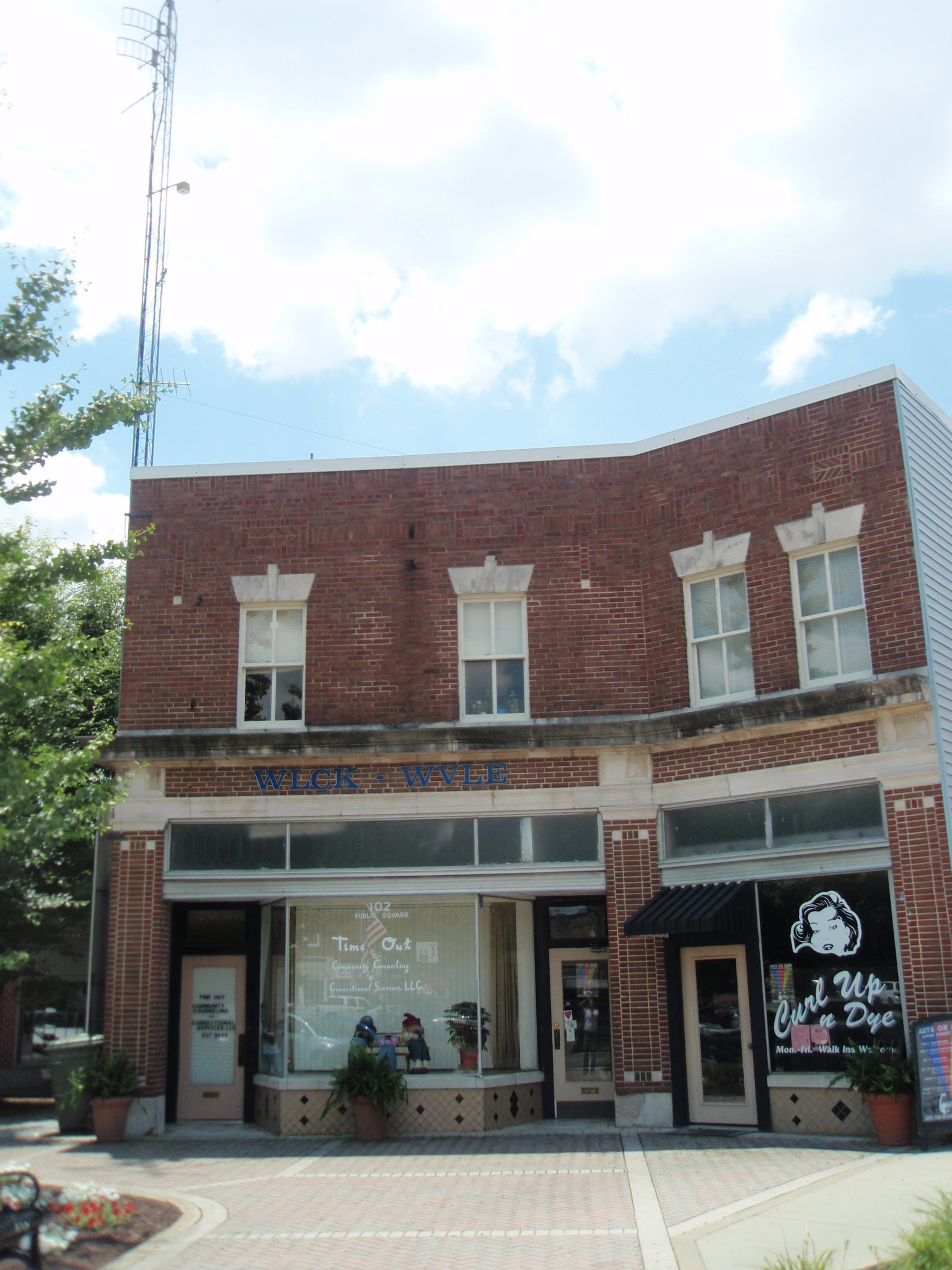
- WLCK - WVLE studios
- Scottsville, Kentucky; United States
- Broadcast area: Bowling Green metropolitan area, Kentucky
- Frequency: 1250 kHz
- Branding: WLCK 1250am

Programming
- Format: Southern Gospel
- Affiliations: Salem Communications

Ownership
- Owner: Skytower Communications Group, LLC
- Sister stations: WGGC, WVLE

History
- First air date: February 27, 1958; 67 years ago

Technical information
- Licensing authority: FCC
- Facility ID: 60149
- Class: D
- Power: 860 watts (day); 76 watts (night)
- Transmitter coordinates: 36°44′25″N 86°10′31″W
- Repeater: 100.1 W261DO (Scottsville)

Links
- Public license information: Public file; LMS

WLCK (1250 AM) is a radio station broadcasting a Southern Gospel format, licensed to Scottsville, Kentucky and owned by Skytower Communications Group, LLC. The station serves the Bowling Green area and features programming from Salem Communications.

The station shares studio facilities with sister station WVLE at 102 1/2 Public Square in downtown Scottsville.

== History ==
The station's origins can be traced back to Campbellsville, in March 1948, where the WLCK callsign was originally used on a local station at 1450 kilohertz. That station merged with WTCO in 1955.

Three years later, the WLCK callsign reappeared when Scottsville's first radio station began broadcasting at 1250 kilohertz with 500 watts of power in February 1958. At that time, WLCK was under ownership of State Line Broadcasting Company.

WLCK's FM companion station was launched in 1967; that station was later renamed WVLE.

Logo before translator sign on
