= WVLE =

- Scottsville, Kentucky; United States
- Broadcast area: Bowling Green, Kentucky
- Frequency: 99.3 MHz
- Branding: 99.3 Love FM

Programming
- Format: Soft adult contemporary

Ownership
- Owner: Skytower Communications Group, LLC
- Sister stations: WGGC, WLCK

History
- First air date: February 26, 1967; 58 years ago (as WLCK-FM)
- Former call signs: WLCK-FM (1967–1986)

Technical information
- Licensing authority: FCC
- Facility ID: 60148
- Class: A
- ERP: 6,000 watts
- HAAT: 100 meters (328 feet)
- Transmitter coordinates: 36°44′25″N 86°10′31″W

Links
- Public license information: Public file; LMS
- Website: www.wvle.net

WVLE (99.3 FM, "99.3 Love FM") is a radio station licensed to serve Scottsville, Kentucky. The station is owned by Skytower Communications Group, LLC. It airs a soft adult contemporary music format.

== History ==
The station began broadcasting as WLCK-FM, an FM companion of WLCK, Scottsville's first radio station. The station simulcasted WLCK's programming full time until 1986, when it became a Country music station.

The station was assigned these call letters by the Federal Communications Commission (FCC) on April 28, 1986, per the request made by Danny Tabor, which owned the station with Joe Hite at that time.

The station would later switch to its current soft adult contemporary format at some time in the 2000s.

== Programming ==
In addition to its usual soft AC music playlist, WVLE also broadcasts football and boys' and girls' basketball games involving the athletic programs of Allen County-Scottsville High School.

The audio of WVLE is also heard on North Central Telephone Cooperative cable channel 6.

== Translators ==
Broadcast translators of WVLE
Call sign	Frequency(MHz)	City of license	FacilityID	ERP (W)	Height(m (ft))	Class	Coordinates	FCC info
WVLE	99.3	Scottsville, Kentucky	60148	6000	100 m (328 ft)	A	36° 44' 25.10" N 86° 10' 30.90" W	FCC Website
