= WKCT =

Radio station in Bowling Green, Kentucky, United States

- Bowling Green, Kentucky; United States
- Broadcast area: Bowling Green
- Frequency: 930 kHz
- Branding: TALK 104.1

Programming
- Format: News Talk Information
- Affiliations: Fox News Radio; Compass Media Networks; Premiere Networks; Westwood One

Ownership
- Owner: Daily News Broadcasting Co.
- Sister stations: WDNS

History
- First air date: November 1, 1947; 78 years ago

Technical information
- Licensing authority: FCC
- Facility ID: 65589
- Class: B
- Power: 1,000 watts day 59 watts night
- Transmitter coordinates: 37°2′1.20″N 86°26′25″W
- Translator: 104.1 W281BV (Bowling Green)

Links
- Public license information: Public file; LMS
- Webcast: Listen Live
- Website: talk104fm.com

WKCT (930 AM) is a News Talk Information–formatted radio station licensed to Bowling Green, Kentucky, United States. The station is owned by the Daily News Broadcasting Company as part of a duopoly with classic rock station WDNS (93.3 FM). Both stations share studios on College Street in downtown Bowling Green, while its transmitter is located along KY 185 adjacent to the Barren River just north of the city. WKCT features programming from Fox News Radio, Compass Media Networks, Premiere Networks and Westwood One.

To complement its AM signal, WKCT operates a translator station on 104.1 FM as W281BV. The translator's transmitter is located along Blue Line Providence Road west of Bowling Green.

== History ==
The station signed on the air on November 1, 1947, as Bowling Green's second commercial radio station and the station for The Park City Daily News. The station was originally affiliated with ABC Radio. In the early years, while WKCT struggled in terms of listener support, but their commitment to local news and farm news led to the station's news division winning several Associated Press news awards.

The station played an Adult contemporary format, along with at least 10 hours of country music programming per week during the 1970s and 1980s. It then switched to a news/talk format at some point before 1990.

=== WKCT on the FM dial ===
On January 23, 2017, WKCT signed on a new FM translator to broadcast on a 24-hour basis. W281BV broadcasts WKCT's night programming at 104.1 Megahertz on the FM dial for the purpose of providing its nightly schedule, because WKCT is required to power down at sunset under the FCC-approved license, and in order to avoid interference with other AM signals broadcasting at 930 kHz.

“Talk 104.1 FM” is the overall tenth commercial low-powered FM repeater in the Bowling Green/Glasgow radio market. It also makes WKCT the third AM radio station in the immediate Bowling Green area simulcasting radio programming on an FM repeater after ESPN Radio station WWKU and Fox Sports Radio affiliate turned Classic country station WBGN.

== Programming ==
The station is now affiliated with Fox News Radio and broadcasts all of that network's hourly newscasts; it was a CBS News Radio affiliate until that program's May 2026 ending. The station also broadcasts Bowling Green High School Football and Greenwood High School football games. Syndicated radio shows on the station include those of Kentucky Sports Radio, Sean Hannity, and Dave Ramsey.

Beginning in April 2022, WKCT became the radio broadcast home to the Bowling Green Hot Rods of Minor League Baseball. They were originally broadcast on WBGN for the team's first 12 years in Bowling Green.

== Translator ==
WKCT operates an FM translator for the immediate Bowling Green area:

Call sign	Frequency	City of license	FID	ERP (W)	HAAT	Class	Transmitter coordinates	FCC info	Notes
W281BV	104.1 FM	Bowling Green, Kentucky	141263	250	123 m (404 ft)	D	36°57′37.2″N 86°32′49.0″W	LMS	Previously; W288CY (2013–2014) and W234CI (2014–2017)
