= WQXE =

FM radio station in Elizabethtown, Kentucky, United States

- Elizabethtown, Kentucky; United States
- Broadcast area: Elizabethtown, Kentucky
- Frequency: 98.3 MHz
- Branding: Quicksie 98.3

Programming
- Format: Adult contemporary
- Affiliations: Westwood One

Ownership
- Owner: Skytower Communications-E'town, Inc.
- Sister stations: WGGC, WULF

History
- First air date: November 24, 1969 (at 106.3)
- Former frequencies: 106.3 MHz (1969–1972); 100.1 MHz (1972–1992); 98.5 MHz (1992–1995)
- Call sign meaning: QuiXiE

Technical information
- Licensing authority: FCC
- Facility ID: 26017
- Class: C3
- ERP: 8,500 watts
- HAAT: 162 meters
- Transmitter coordinates: 37°43′18″N 86°2′10″W
- Repeater: 92.9 W225BS (Elizabethtown)

Links
- Public license information: Public file; LMS
- Webcast: Live Stream
- Website: wqxe.com

WQXE (98.3 FM) is a radio station broadcasting an adult contemporary format. Licensed to Elizabethtown, Kentucky, United States, the station is currently owned by Skytower Communications-E'town, Inc. and features programming from Westwood One.

== History ==
The station's construction permit was first issued to original station owner, local businessman Bill Evans on November 22, 1968. Two years later, the station signed on the air at 106.3 MHz on November 24, 1969, at 10 a.m. Eastern time. The station was the first FM station to broadcast from Elizabethtown. Evans decided to give the station the nickname "Quicksie", after a Georgia-based radio station with that nickname that he heard while attending Elkins Radio School. The call letters were chosen by Evans himself per a vow that if he ever owned a station, he'd make sure that the call letters matched the "Quicksie" branding. The station began operating with an Adult contemporary format, or as newspapers advertisements of the time labeled it, "tamer rock-and-roll". The AC format remains with the station to this day. The station's original studio facility was a small cinder block building in Glendale, operating from 6 a.m. to midnight Eastern time before becoming a 24-hour radio station in May 1970. At that time, WQXE was the only radio station in central Kentucky to operate on a 24-hour basis.

According to a snapshot at the LKYRadio.com website, the station had broadcast certain high school football and basketball games featuring teams representing Hardin County-area schools, along with some games involving the Bowling Green-based Western Kentucky University Hilltoppers football during the 1970s, which have since moved to WIEL and WTHX.

In April 1972, the station reallocated from their original frequency of 106.3 MHz to 100.1 MHz. The station began adding beautiful music to their music offerings on September 1, 1976. December 1978 saw the station moving to a larger facility at 245 West Dixie Street.

The station reallocated to 98.5 MHz in 1992. The move to 98.5 was not without controversy as Bowling Green-based classic rock station WDNS, which was also broadcasting at 98.3 MHz, had announced plans to increase its signal power the previous year, which would've caused adjacent-frequency interference. The move to 98.3 MHz on December 31, 1995, coincided with the time that WDNS moved from 98.3 to their current frequency of 93.3 MHz.

On September 21, 2003, WQXE, along with its new sister station, Hardinsburg-licensed WULF (94.3 MHz), relocated to its current shared facility at 233 West Dixie Avenue.

On October 14, 2019, WQXE was named Kentucky Broadcasters Association Excellence in Broadcasting Radio Station of the year. Owner and founder Bill Evans accepted this honor.

== Programming ==
In-house reporters broadcast seven newscasts daily with locally written and produced content.

== Coverage area ==
WQXE serves areas of west-central and north-central Kentucky, mainly in areas between Cave City and Louisville, and into parts of southernmost Indiana. The station can be heard as far south as the Mammoth Cave tourist area and Brownsville, as far west as Morgantown, Beaver Dam, and just short of Owensboro, as far east as Lebanon, Kentucky, and as far north as an area just north of the Jeffersonville and Corydon areas in Indiana. WQXE can also be received in much of the Louisville metropolitan area.

== Translators ==
In addition to the main station, WQXE is relayed by an additional translator to widen its broadcast area.

Call sign	Frequency	City of license	FID	ERP (W)	Class	FCC info
W225BS	92.9 FM	Elizabethtown, Kentucky	157649	250	D	LMS

== Notable former on-air staff ==
- Country music artist John Conlee once served as a deejay in the early 1970s.
