= WCDS =

Radio station in Glasgow, Kentucky

- Glasgow, Kentucky; United States
- Broadcast area: Bowling Green–Cave City–Barren County–Munfordville, Kentucky
- Frequency: 1230 kHz
- Branding: 104.7 The Score

Programming
- Format: Sports
- Affiliations: Fox Sports Radio

Ownership
- Owner: Commonwealth Broadcasting; (Newberry Broadcasting, Inc.)
- Sister stations: W239BT, WBGN, WCLU, WHHT, WKLX, WLYE-FM, WWZG

History
- First air date: 2007
- Former call signs: WWKU (2005–2007)

Technical information
- Licensing authority: FCC
- Facility ID: 160849
- Class: C
- Power: 750 watts (day and night)
- Transmitter coordinates: 37°0′17″N 86°56′27″W
- Translator: 104.7 W284DH (Glasgow)

Links
- Public license information: Public file; LMS
- Webcast: Listen Live
- Website: 104thescore.com

WCDS (1230 AM and 104.7 FM) is a radio station that broadcasts a sports radio format. The station is licensed to Glasgow, Kentucky, and serves the Bowling Green radio market, including the Cave region of west-central Kentucky. It is owned by Commonwealth Broadcasting through licensee Newberry Broadcasting, Inc, and is an affiliate of Fox Sports Radio.

== History ==
The station began broadcasting in 2005 as the original WWKU. In 2007, the station swapped callsigns with Plum Springs-licensed 1450 AM to become WCDS.

In August 2014, the station purchased former WayFM translator W251BT (98.1 FM), intending to simulcast its AM programming; it became a translator for WPTQ-HD2 instead. W284DH was later launched as a WCDS translator.

== Programming ==
The station broadcasts Fox Sports sports talk. It includes Dan Patrick, Colin Cowherd, and Doug Gottlieb. It also covers via its website local sports for Barren County High School, Glasgow High School and Caverna High School. It broadcasts Cincinnati Reds games, Western Kentucky University sports, and the Brown Sports Bag with James Brown and John Butler.
