= WHHT =

Radio station in Cave City, Kentucky

- Cave City, Kentucky; United States
- Broadcast area: Bowling Green metropolitan area
- Frequency: 103.7 MHz (HD Radio)
- Branding: 103.7 WHHT

Programming
- Format: Country
- Subchannels: HD2: WBGN simulcast (adult hits); HD3: Adult contemporary "Zing! 106.7 & 92.1"; HD4: Classical "Classical 97.5"

Ownership
- Owner: Commonwealth Broadcasting; (Newberry Broadcasting, Inc.)
- Sister stations: W239BT, WCLU, WCDS, WKLX, WLYE-FM, WWZG

History
- First air date: September 2, 1988
- Former call signs: WHHT (1988–1998); WPTQ (1998–2012)
- Former frequencies: 106.7 MHz (1988–1991)
- Call sign meaning: "Hot"

Technical information
- Licensing authority: FCC
- Facility ID: 48704
- Class: C3
- ERP: 13,500 watts
- HAAT: 137 meters (449 ft)
- Transmitter coordinates: 36°57′34.1″N 86°0′7.9″W
- Translators: HD2: 95.7 W239BT (Glasgow); HD3: 106.7 W294DB (Glasgow)

Links
- Public license information: Public file; LMS
- Webcast: Listen live HD3: Listen live
- Website: 1037whht.com HD3: zingfm.com

WHHT (103.7 FM) is a country music–formatted radio station licensed to Cave City, Kentucky, United States, and serving the Bowling Green area. The station is owned by Commonwealth Broadcasting through licensee Newberry Broadcasting, Inc.

The station studios, which are shared with Fox Sports Radio affiliate WCDS (1230 AM) are located on the Public Square in downtown Glasgow. WHHT's transmitter is located near Haywood, Kentucky.

== History ==
=== Early years at 106.7 MHz (1988–1991) ===
The station signed on the air for the first time on September 2, 1988, at 106.7 MHz, as a Top 40/CHR music station, with the on-air identity as "Hottest Hits". The station's studios were located on Happy Valley Road in Glasgow, Kentucky. Steve Newberry was General Manager and part owner of the station, whose first air staff included Duke Ryan, Scott Jackson, Bobby Rambo, Jonathan "Tunes" Taylor, and Jim "The Captain" Kirk, the latter of which was later known as Scotty Matthews on sister station WKNK-FM (99.1 MHz licensed to Edmonton, now WHSX). WHHT was an immediate ratings success, allowing Newberry to expand his radio ownership holdings. He is now among the premier small-market radio station owners in the U.S., and is an active member of the board of the National Association of Broadcasters, having testified before the U.S. Congress on the issue of royalties and performance rights. WHHT was also an affiliate of Casey's Top 40 during its early heyday.

=== Move to 103.7 MHz (1991–1998) ===
In August 1991, WHHT's frequency was changed to 103.7 under the FCC's orders, to facilitate a signal power increase by Smiths Grove–licensed WBLG-FM (107.1 MHz, now WUHU), based in nearby Bowling Green.

In 1997, WHHT, along with WOVO, WXPC, WCDS, and four other stations in Kentucky, were acquired by a new business venture named Commonwealth Broadcasting Corporation, formed by Steve Newberry and former Kentucky governor Brereton C. Jones. The following year, WHHT and its adult contemporary format replaced WXPC on 106.7 MHz, which had returned to the air from Horse Cave under a new license in 1994. The 103.7 facility then switched to a classic rock format under the call sign of WPTQ.

=== Three-way frequency swap ===
On October 22, 2012, WPTQ and sister stations WHHT and WOVO were involved in a three-station format shift that included a trade of frequencies and FCC licenses. WHHT, now a country music station, moved back to 103.7 MHz. WPTQ, which was previously occupying the 103.7 FM frequency, moved to 105.3 FM, while WOVO and its adult contemporary format moved to the newly upgraded 106.3 FM facility in Horse Cave.

=== Recent history ===
WHHT's former logo as 103.7 Nash Icon from 2015 to 2020.

On February 20, 2015, the station made the transition to becoming another Nash Icon station, that is not owned and operated by Cumulus Media. For a time, the station also kept its "Howdy" branding, and was branded as "103.7 Nash Icon Howdy FM".

On August 6, 2020, WHHT dropped the Nash Icon branding, and became known as "Nash 103.7".

On April 18, 2024, WHHT rebranded simply as "103.7 WHHT".

=== W239BT ===
W239BT / WHHT-HD2
Simulcast of WBGN Munfordville
- Glasgow, Kentucky; United States
- Broadcast area: Cave City area; Bowling Green area
- Frequency: 95.7 MHz
- Branding: 102.3/95.7 Jack FM

Programming
- Format: Adult hits

Ownership
- Owner: Commonwealth Broadcasting; (Newberry Broadcasting, Inc.)
- Sister stations: WBGN, WCDS, WCLU, WHHT, WLYE-FM

History
- First air date: 2015

Technical information
- Licensing authority: FCC
- Facility ID: 143295
- Class: D
- ERP: 250 watts
- HAAT: 114.4 meters (375 ft)
- Transmitter coordinates: 36°57′34″N 86°00′08″W
- Repeater: (103.7-2) WHHT-HD2 (Horse Cave)

Links
- Public license information: / WHHT-HD2 Public file; LMS

W239BT (95.7 MHz) is a low-powered radio translator station that is licensed to Glasgow, Kentucky, United States, and primarily serving the Caveland area and the Bowling Green, Kentucky vicinity. Owned by Commonwealth Broadcasting, it currently airs a simulcast of adult hits-formatted WBGN 102.3 FM in Munfordville, and it is known on air as "102.3/95.7 Jack FM". W239BT transmits from a tower located near Haywood, just southwest of Glasgow.

The translator-style radio station is simulcast over a HD2 subchannel, WHHT-HD2, that can be accessible via an HD Radio Tuner. This makes WHHT the second radio station in Bowling Green to multi-plex their HD Radio signal; sister station WPTQ was the first in the market to do so.

==== History ====
Logo under initial branding and colors

WOVO launched the station on a HD2 subchannel in 2015. Most radio users do not have an HD Radio set, so the subchannel has been simulcasting over two translators, W239BT of Glasgow, and W240CP in Bowling Green; both were launched in April 2015.

On March 21, 2018, W239BT/WOVO-HD2 rebranded as "95.9 The Vibe".

On November 18, 2024, W239BT switched its parent station from WOVO's HD2 subchannel to WHHT's HD2 subchannel and began stunting with Christmas music, branded as "Santa 102.3/95.7", simulcasting WLLI (102.3 FM, now WBGN), licensed to Munfordville. On December 26, WLLI and W239BT ended stunting, and began broadcasting an adult hits format.

==== Signal coverage ====
The station's translator signal mainly covers Barren, Allen, and nearby portions of neighboring counties. The signal can be picked up as far west as Bowling Green, as far north as Munfordville, as far east as Edmonton, and as far south as rural northern Macon County, Tennessee.
