= WUHU =

Radio station in Smiths Grove, Kentucky

- Smiths Grove, Kentucky; United States
- Broadcast area: Bowling Green metropolitan area
- Frequency: 107.1 MHz
- Branding: WUHU 107 FM

Programming
- Format: Hot adult contemporary
- Affiliations: Compass Media Networks

Ownership
- Owner: Seven Mountains Media; (Southern Belle Media Family, LLC)
- Sister stations: W240CP; WBVR; WBVR-FM; WOVO; WPTQ; WKLX

History
- First air date: December 1, 1986
- Former call signs: WBLG (1986–1999); WBLG-FM (1999–2001)
- Call sign meaning: "woo-hoo!"

Technical information
- Licensing authority: FCC
- Facility ID: 27242
- Class: C2
- Power: 50,000 watts
- Transmitter coordinates: 36°50′35″N 86°15′30″W

Links
- Public license information: Public file; LMS
- Webcast: Listen live
- Website: www.wuhu107.com

WUHU (107.1 MHz) is a hot adult contemporary–formatted radio station licensed to Smiths Grove, Kentucky, United States, and serving the Bowling Green area of south central Kentucky. The station is owned by Seven Mountains Media. The station share studios on Scottsville Road in southern Bowling Green, and its transmitter is located along Halifax-Bailey Road between Bowling Green and Scottsville. WUHU features programming from Compass Media Networks.

== History ==
=== As WBLG ===
The station was assigned the call letters WBLG on November 1, 1985, when the FCC first issued the construction permit for the station. The station signed on the air 13 months later, on December 1, 1986. On May 4, 1987, the station was purchased by Hilltopper Broadcasting, a local company that was led by long-time Western Kentucky Hilltoppers play-by-play commentator Wes Strader. That company would also end up owning WBGN the following year. Prior to that purchase, WBGN and WBLG were the only stations in the area with no connection between AM and FM stations.

In the station's first 14 years on the air, WBLG played an adult contemporary format. Hourly national news updates were provided by NBC News Radio during that time period. Throughout much of the late 1980s and 1990s until March 2001, the station was branded as "Gator 107", and later "G-107." In 1991, the station was granted a power increase to 50,000 watts, and announced plans to relocate its transmission facility to its current location. However, this change forced nearby competitor WHHT, a Glasgow-based station which broadcast at 106.7 MHz at the time, to change frequencies to accommodate WBLG's power increase. The station added the "-FM" suffix to its callsign on April 30, 1999.

=== As Top 40 WUHU ===
Former logo (2001–2024)

On March 15, 2001, the station changed its call letters to the current WUHU. The top 40 format and "WUHU" branding were introduced on April 2, 2001, after a weekend stunt during the preceding weekend (March 31–April 1, 2001), in which the station played the same three songs (each of which featured the word "woo-hoo") repeatedly. Forever Communications acquired the station on December 31, 2002.

As a top 40-formatted station, WUHU often competes with WRVW of Lebanon, Tennessee for listener allegiances due to Bowling Green's 60-mile proximity to the Nashville area.

=== Sale to Seven Mountains Media ===
In September 2023, this station, along with three other stations in the area, were acquired by Seven Mountains Media from Forever Communications.

== Programming ==
Along with its music programming, the station is the local home of the American Top 40 and the Weekend Top 30. Weather forecasts aired on the station are provided by the area's NBC/CBS dual affiliate WNKY.

=== Past programming ===
As WBLG, the station served as the flagship for Western Kentucky Hilltoppers basketball from the Hilltopper Sports Network until after the 1998–99 season, when that programming moved to Brownsville-licensed WKLX. During the 1990s, the station also broadcast the football and basketball games of the Warren East High School athletics department.

From March 2000 until March 2001, the station also ran a local program, Live and Local, which featured local musical talents from the region.
