= WTKY-FM =

- Tompkinsville, Kentucky; United States
- Frequency: 102.7 MHz
- Branding: Kix Country

Programming
- Format: Country music

Ownership
- Owner: Jonathan Keeton; (Frank Keeton Aircasters, Inc.)
- Sister stations: WTKY; WVFB

History
- First air date: 2003
- Former call signs: WKWY (2003–2026)
- Call sign meaning: Tompkinsville, Kentucky

Technical information
- Licensing authority: FCC
- Facility ID: 78223
- Class: A
- ERP: 6,000 watts
- HAAT: 96 meters (315 ft)
- Transmitter coordinates: 36°43′27″N 85°40′53″W

Links
- Public license information: Public file; LMS

WTKY-FM (102.7 FM) is a radio station broadcasting a country music format, and licensed to Tompkinsville, Kentucky, United States. WTKY-FM is owned by Jonathan Keeton, through licensee Frank Keeton Aircasters, Inc.
