= WYMC =

- Mayfield, Kentucky; United States
- Frequency: 1430 kHz
- Branding: FM 93.9 AM 1430

Programming
- Format: Full service oldies
- Affiliations: NBC News Radio

Ownership
- Owner: JDM Communications, Inc.

History
- First air date: 1976

Technical information
- Licensing authority: FCC
- Facility ID: 30619
- Class: B
- Power: 1,000 watts
- Transmitter coordinates: 36°47′12″N 88°39′16″W
- Translator: 93.9 W230BN (Mayfield)

Links
- Public license information: Public file; LMS
- Website: mywymc.com

WYMC (1430 AM) is a radio station licensed to Mayfield, Kentucky, United States. The station airs a full service oldies format and is owned by JDM Communications, Inc. WYMC is also heard on 93.9 FM through a translator in Mayfield, Kentucky.

Former logo

Broadcast translator for WYMC
Call sign	Frequency	City of license	FID	ERP (W)	HAAT	Class	FCC info
W230BN	93.9 FM	Mayfield, Kentucky	145366	250	122.1 m (401 ft)	D	LMS
