= WCLU (AM) =

Radio station in Glasgow, Kentucky

- Glasgow, Kentucky; United States
- Broadcast area: Glasgow; Cave City; Bowling Green, Kentucky; Mammoth Cave area
- Frequency: 1490 kHz
- Branding: AM 1490 WCLU

Programming
- Format: Adult contemporary
- Affiliations: ABC News Radio

Ownership
- Owner: Commonwealth Broadcasting; (Newberry Broadcasting, Inc.)
- Sister stations: W239BT, WCDS, WHHT, WBGN, WKLX, WWZG

History
- First air date: September 25, 1946
- Former call signs: WKAY (1946–1988)

Technical information
- Licensing authority: FCC
- Facility ID: 57895
- Class: C
- Power: 1,000 watts
- Transmitter coordinates: 36°59′2″N 85°52′20″W
- Translator: 103.1 W276DO (Glasgow)

Links
- Public license information: Public file; LMS
- Webcast: wcluradio.com
- Website: www.wcluradio.com

WCLU (1490 AM) is a radio station licensed to Glasgow, Kentucky, United States, and serving Bowling Green, and the Caveland area of south-central Kentucky. The station is owned by Commonwealth Broadcasting and airs in an adult contemporary format. The station's studios, shared with sister stations WLYE-FM, WBGN, W239BT, WHHT, and WWZG, are located at the Commerce Plaza Building on the Public Square in downtown Glasgow.

== History ==
=== Early days as WKAY (1946–1988) ===
The station began broadcasting at 2 p.m. Central time on the afternoon of September 25, 1946 as WKAY, the first of two radio stations originally owned by Glasgow Broadcasting, Inc., along with WGGC (95.1 FM) when it signed on in 1961. Glasgow Broadcasting was formed by a group of civic leaders to build the station. As one of the first new radio stations to sign on after the second world war, WKAY's original studios were located at 510 Happy Valley Road in Glasgow; that facility was demolished in November 2014 to make room for a new drug store. The station's original transmitting tower was made entirely of 170 feet (52 m) worth of cast iron oil well casing, due to the unavailability of structural steel during World War II and its immediate aftermath; a real tower wasn't erected until 1963. After completing that tower in 1963, the station increased their broadcast power to 1,000 watts by day, and 250 watts by night. Although the station wasn't affiliated with any network, the station still carried popular shows such as Amos 'n' Andy and Bing Crosby's radio programs through syndication.

In 1971, both WKAY and WGGC went under ownership of the Sadler Family, which had been involved in operating the station since 1948. Shortly before this happened, WKAY switched to a middle-of-the-road format. Around this time, the station upgraded its signal power to 1,000 watts by day and 250 watts by night. WGGC was simulcasting WKAY until sometime in the early 1970s, when the former of which became one of the first country music stations to be broadcast from southern Kentucky.

=== Royce Radio ownership as WCLU (1988–2024) ===
In 1988, the AM station was purchased by the locally based Royse Radio, presided by former WCDS employee Henry Royse, who is currently serving as Mayor of Glasgow; afterwards, he changed the station's call letters to the current WCLU, which stood for the names of Royse's children. The station became a full-service station that same year.

In 1991, WCLU moved into a new facility on West Main Street in downtown Glasgow, with the AM station's transmission tower and WGGC studios remaining at the old studios; WGGC would relocate its studios and broadcasting license to Bowling Green in 2000 and 2002, respectively.

=== FM translator ===
Sometime in the mid-2010s, the station launched a low-powered FM translator, W276DO, to make the station's programming available to FM listeners.

=== Ownership change and consolidation with WCDS ===
In August 2024, it was announced that Seven Mountains Media had closed a $450,000 deal to buy this station and WLLI (102.3 FM, now WBGN) from Royse Radio. Two months later in October 2024, Seven Mountains announced that they and Commonwealth Broadcasting agreed to swap stations, including WCLU.

On November 1, 2024, WCLU began simulcasting its programming over WCDS (AM 1230) and its FM translator W284DH (FM 104.7).

On September 25, 2026, the station held a ceremony to mark its 80th anniversary by recreating the station's inaugural program on the air; this included a traditional sign-on and the playing of The Star-Spangled Banner.

== Programming format ==
The station's current oldies format is also accompanied with local talk radio programming, including local newscasts, and local sports coverage. Top-of-hour national newscasts provided through ABC News Radio; previous radio network affiliations include UPI News prior to 1988, and CBS News Radio from 1988 until that network's 2026 closure. In addition to ABC News Radio's national news updates, the station also airs state news updates provided by the Kentucky News Network.

=== Sports programming ===
WCLU is also home to sports games of the Glasgow High School football and basketball teams. In the 1960s and parts of the 1970s, the station also aired radio coverage of football and basketball games of the Kentucky Wildcats and the WKU Hilltoppers, as well select games of Major League Baseball's Cincinnati Reds; the Kentucky games and Reds games were originally shared with WGGC.
