= WIEL =

- Elizabethtown, Kentucky; United States
- Frequency: 1400 kHz
- Branding: ESPN 106.1 FM

Programming
- Format: Sports
- Affiliations: ESPN Radio

Ownership
- Owner: Commonwealth Broadcasting; (Elizabethtown CBC, Inc.)
- Sister stations: WWKU, WRZI, WKMO-FM

History
- First air date: October 1, 1950
- Call sign meaning: Elizabethtown

Technical information
- Licensing authority: FCC
- Facility ID: 19355
- Class: C
- Power: 1,000 watts (unlimited)
- Transmitter coordinates: 37°44′39″N 85°48′49″W
- Translators: 92.3 W222CD (Louisville); 106.1 W291CU (Elizabethtown)

Links
- Public license information: Public file; LMS
- Website: highbaugh.goatley.com/1400wiel.html

WIEL (1400 AM) is a radio station licensed to Elizabethtown, Kentucky, United States. The station is owned by Elizabethtown Cbc, Inc. and features programming from ESPN Radio, Motor Racing Network and Westwood One. From the 1960s to the 1980s, the station aired a mix of Adult Contemporary and Top-40 formats.
