= WPTQ =

Radio station in Glasgow, Kentucky

- Glasgow, Kentucky; United States
- Broadcast area: Bowling Green metropolitan area
- Frequency: 105.3 MHz (HD Radio)
- Branding: 105.3 The Goat

Programming
- Format: Classic rock
- Subchannels: HD2/HD3: Rhythmic throwbacks "98 Jamz"
- Affiliations: The Goat; Westwood One

Ownership
- Owner: Seven Mountains Media; (Southern Belle Bowling Green, LLC)
- Sister stations: W240CP; WBVR; WBVR-FM; WOVO; WUHU; WKLX

History
- First air date: July 14, 1972 (at 105.5 MHz)
- Former call signs: WOVO (1972–1991); WWWQ (1991–1996); WOVO (1996–2012); WHHT (2012)
- Former frequencies: 105.5 MHz (1972–1991)

Technical information
- Licensing authority: FCC
- Facility ID: 70870
- Class: C3
- ERP: 15,000 watts
- HAAT: 132 meters (433 ft)
- Transmitter coordinates: 36°58′50″N 86°06′10″W
- Translators: HD2: 98.1 W251BT (Glasgow); HD2: 98.3 W252CV (Bowling Green); HD2: 102.7 W274CD (Plum Springs)

Links
- Public license information: Public file; LMS
- Webcast: Listen live; HD2: Listen live
- Website: hearthegoat.com; HD2: thepointrocks.com

WPTQ (105.3 MHz) is a radio station licensed to Glasgow, Kentucky, United States, and serving the Bowling Green metropolitan area. The station is a classic rock-formatted radio station owned by Seven Mountains Media. Its radio signal is transmitted from a tower located along Kentucky Route 1297 in rural western Barren County near Railton, with studios located on McIntosh Street near US 231 on the south side of Bowling Green.

== History ==
The station signed on the air on July 14, 1972. It was originally a class A station located at 105.5 FM, owned by John Barrick alongside AM station WCDS (1440 AM). WOVO inherited a variety format from WCDS, which switched exclusively to country music upon WOVO's inception. WOVO ran a longtime Top 40 music format, with an original ERP of 1,000 watts. During the 1980s, the station went with the branding "V-105".

In 1990, WOVO and WCDS were sold to Ward Communications. After a few months off the air due to strong winds toppling the transmission tower in 1991, the station had instituted three changes: the station changed frequencies to 105.3 FM to obtain a power increase, changed its call sign to WWWQ on March 1, and restore its contemporary hit radio format upon returning to the air on July 9, 1991, following a tornado that affected the station's broadcasting facility that spring. On September 23, 1996, the station reversed their 1991 change of callsign and rechristened itself as WOVO.

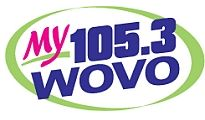
Last logo as WOVO

In 1997, the station, along with WHHT, WXPC, WCDS, and four other stations in Kentucky, were acquired by a new business venture named Commonwealth Broadcasting Corporation, formed by Steve Newberry and former Kentucky governor Brereton Jones. WOVO programming was simulcast over WCDS from its 1998 return to the air until it became a sports radio station in 2002.

On October 22, 2012, WPTQ and its classic rock format replaced WOVO on 105.3 FM; that station and its adult contemporary format moved to the Horse Cave-licensed 106.3 FM frequency. The 103.7 MHz frequency was returned to WHHT, which had been displaced from that frequency in 1998.

On February 16, 2014, WPTQ launched an active rock format on its HD2 sub channel, branded as "98.3 The Edge", which is relayed on Bowling Green-licensed FM translator W252CV (98.3 MHz) and Glasgow-licensed W251BV (98.1 MHz). On July 27, 2026, that station switched to an urban contemporary format, playing rhythmic throwback hip-hop and R&B hits from the 1990s through the 2010s.

In October 2024, it was announced that Commonwealth Broadcasting and Seven Mountains Media agreed to a station swap of several stations in the Bowling Green, and Glasgow, Kentucky area (including this station, W240CP, WOVO, and WWKU).

On March 20, 2025, WPTQ rebranded as "105.3 The Goat".

== HD digital radio ==
The station's HD Digital radio signal is multiplexed in the following manner.

Frequency and subchannels	Callsign	Programming
105.3 FM; 105.3-1 HD	WPTQ; WPTQ-HD1	Classic rock
105.3-2	WPTQ-HD2	98 Jamz (rhythmic throwbacks)
105.3-3	WPTQ-HD3	98 Jamz (rhythmic throwbacks)

=== HD radio subchannel history ===
This station began broadcasting on February 17, 2014, as a new active rock station, branded as 98.3 The Edge. The launch of WPTQ-HD2 made WPTQ the first radio station in the Bowling Green radio market to multi-cast their HD radio signal. The subchannel is simulcast over an analog low-powered FM translator W252CV to make the HD radio subchannel available to those who do not own an HD Radio set. The effective radiated power of the translator is limited to 250 watts in order to avoid interference with WQXE in nearby Elizabethtown, Kentucky, which is also run at 98.3 Megahertz.

Since February 2016, the programming of W252CV has also been simulcast at 100.1 Megahertz, on translator W261BD. That translator previously simulcast WKLX's signal. Later that year, the station also began to simulcast over translator W251BT in Glasgow over 98.1 Megahertz.

== Programming ==
WPTQ broadcasts a classic rock music format to the Bowling Green, Kentucky, area. The format features classic rock songs from the 1960s, 1970s and 1980s, as well as select Active Rock songs from the 1990s and 2000s. In addition to its usual music programming, WPTQ broadcasts the games of the National Football League's Tennessee Titans through the Titans Radio Network. It is also the flagship radio station for WKU Hilltoppers football from the Hilltopper Sports Network.

=== WPTQ-HD2/W252CV ===
As an active rock station, the station broadcasts rock hits from the 1980s, 1990s, 2000s, and the current decade, with only the biggest acts in rock and roll from the 1970s. The Local Show, which is now run on this station on Sunday nights at 7 p.m. Central time, is a local show showcasing local rock bands in southern Kentucky.

On March 20, 2025, WPTQ-HD2 rebranded as "98.3 The Point".
