= WKYU-TV =

Television station in Bowling Green, Kentucky

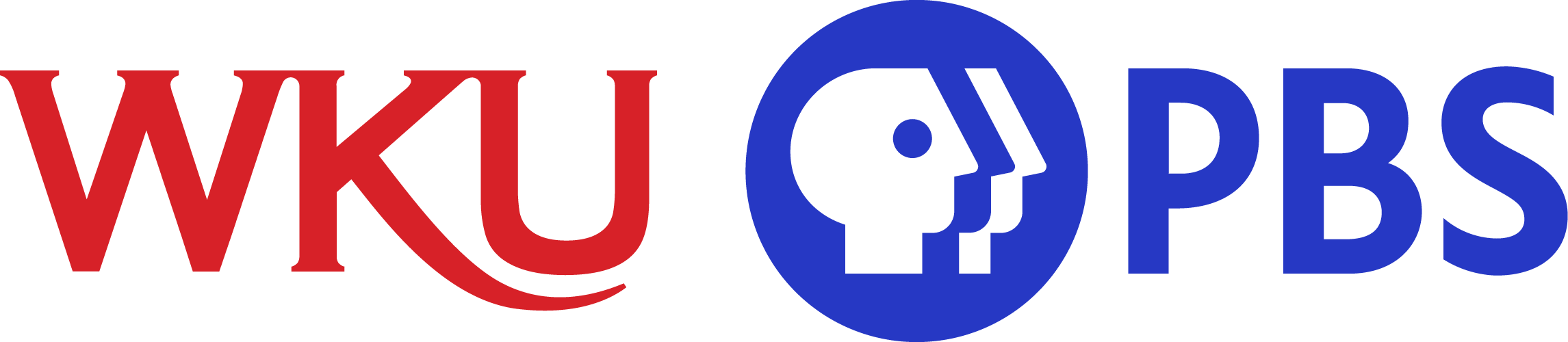
- Bowling Green, Kentucky; United States
- Channels: Digital: 18 (UHF); Virtual: 24
- Branding: WKU PBS

Programming
- Affiliations: 24.1: PBS; 24.2: Create; 24.3: Weather radar

Ownership
- Owner: Western Kentucky University
- Sister stations: Radio: WKYU-FM, WWHR-FM

History
- Founded: February 28, 1986
- First air date: January 17, 1989
- Former channel numbers: Analog: 24 (UHF, 1989–2009)
- Former affiliations: ASN/Stadium (secondary, 2014–2023)
- Call sign meaning: Western Kentucky University

Technical information
- Licensing authority: FCC
- Facility ID: 71861
- ERP: 61 kW
- HAAT: 176.9 m (580 ft)
- Transmitter coordinates: 37°3′49.2″N 86°26′6.7″W

Links
- Public license information: Public file; LMS
- Website: WKU PBS

WKYU-TV (channel 24) is a secondary PBS member television station in Bowling Green, Kentucky, United States. Owned by Western Kentucky University as an arm of its Information Technology department, it is a sister station to NPR member network WKU Public Radio with its flagship station WKYU-FM (88.9), adult album alternative station WWHR-FM (91.7) and classical music station W248CF (97.5 FM). The four outlets share studios at the Academic Complex building on the WKU campus on College Heights Boulevard; WKYU-TV's transmitter is located six miles (10 km) north of Bowling Green along KY 185, on a tower shared with ABC/Fox/CW+ affiliate WBKO (channel 13) and Telemundo affiliate WBGS-CD (channel 34).

WKYU-TV is a member of PBS' Program Differentiation Plan (PDP), previously known as the "Beta" group; as the Bowling Green market's secondary PBS station, it only airs 25% of the network's schedule.

== History ==
WKYU-TV logo from 1998 to 2013

The Broadcasting and Mass Media Department of Western Kentucky University was granted a construction permit by the Federal Communications Commission (FCC) on February 28, 1986, to build a public television station under the chosen callsign WKYU-TV to match that of its pre-existing NPR member outlet WKYU-FM. Plans for the opening of the television station dated back to about ten years prior. Under the director of Dr. Chuck Anderson, the station was established as an addition to the university's extensive broadcast program that has already established a network of what would eventually become four NPR member stations in the west-central and southern portions of the state. Transmission equipment for the station was pre-installed at ABC affiliate WBKO's tower site in 1988 to keep the start-up costs to a minimum.

WKYU-TV would not only compete against locally based Kentucky Educational Television (KET) station WKGB-TV (channel 53), but also be a source for locally produced public affairs programming focusing solely on the south-central Kentucky area. The station signed on the air for the first time on January 17, 1989, at 3 p.m. Central standard time. Upon its inception, it became the second PBS member station within Kentucky that was separate from statewide PBS-member network KET until 1997, when it became the only one remaining in Kentucky when the statewide network acquired Louisville's WKPC-TV.

The station's digital signal was activated over UHF digital channel 18 on May 1, 2003.

After years of branding as "WKYU-TV" or "WKYU PBS" for most of its history, the station rebranded as "WKU PBS" in 2013, using the university's logo along with the PBS icon.

=== WKYU subchannels ===
In 2010, WKYU-TV began airing the Create TV channel that is syndicated by American Public Television on their second digital subchannel, replacing the audio-only simulcast of WKU Public Radio. The Create TV channel features how-to programs and some cooking and travel shows, as well as PBS NewsHour, which is broadcast on the DT2 subchannel in order to make room for local programming on the main channel.

Around the same time, WKYU-DT3 began featuring the National Weather Service Fort Campbell weather radar on the screen, and simulcasting NOAA Weather Radio station KIH-45, which operates on 162.400 MHz on the weather band radio dial. It was also previously simulcast on a fourth digital subchannel before the fourth subchannel was discontinued in late 2010. In 2017, the radar display was upgraded to use GRLevel3 software, discontinuing use of the web image.

== Programming ==
WKYU-TV's program schedule consists mainly of a handful of PBS programs, including a few PBS Kids programs, as well as programs syndicated by American Public Television. Its program schedule for the day was previously posted on "Community Calendar" slides shown with audio of WKU Public Radio during that station's daily downtime from 3 to 7 a.m. CT (11 p.m. to 7 a.m. before 2012). This practice ended in 2016, when WKYU-TV began to broadcast actual programming 24 hours a day.

=== WKU sports broadcasts ===
Since 1990, WKYU-TV occasionally airs Western Kentucky Hilltoppers football and men's and women's basketball games that do not appear on regional or national commercial sports networks; some game broadcasts were broadcast on a tape-delayed basis in the station's early years. Since 2000, the games are broadcast under a banner called "Hilltopper Sports Satellite Network," for which WKYU-TV is the flagship station. Select WKU men's basketball games on WKYU-TV under that branding were previously simulcast on Fox College Sports, with the audio from the Hilltopper IMG Sports Network. As of 2018, these broadcasts were moved from Fox College Sports to Facebook Live (for exhibitions) and ESPN+. Some of WKU's games may be shown via Sinclair Broadcast Group-operated Stadium's Conference USA syndication package beginning in fall 2014 (when Stadium was known as American Sports Network); hence, WKYU-TV served as a part-time affiliate of Stadium (since Bowling Green has no television station owned by Sinclair) until it was discontinued in 2023. This often takes the form of preempting regular programming to carry the Stadium linear signal for the duration of the event.

=== Newscasts ===
WKYU-TV occasionally broadcasts replays of WKU student-produced 6 p.m. newscasts originating from WKU Cable 12, named NewsChannel 12.

== Technical information ==
=== Subchannels ===
The station's signal is multiplexed:

Subchannels of WKYU-TV
Channel	Res.	Short name	Programming
24.1	1080i	WKYU-HD	PBS
24.2	480i	WKYU-CR	Create
24.3	480i	WKYU-WX	National Weather Service Weather radar image from Fort Campbell (link) with NOAA WX Radio KIH45 audio (162.400 MHz).

=== Analog-to-digital conversion ===
WKYU-TV shut down its analog signal on February 17, 2009, as part of the FCC-mandated nationwide digital transition, even though the DTV transition deadline was moved to June 12 of that year. The digital signal, which began operation in 2003, continues to broadcast on its pre-transition channel 18, using virtual channel 24.

== Availability ==
In addition to its over-the-air signal on UHF digital channel 18, WKYU-TV can also be seen on Dish Network channel 24. In Bowling Green, it is also carried on Charter Spectrum (formerly Time Warner Cable) channels 11 in SD and 917 in HD. In Glasgow, it is also seen on South Central Rural Telephone Cooperative (SCRTC) cable channel 24 in Barren, Hart, and Metcalfe counties, as well as on Glasgow Electric Plant Board cable channels 24 (SD) and 540 (HD).

WKYU-DT2 is also available to cable subscribers in Bowling Green and Glasgow, as well as other areas served by the SCRTC. WKYU's main channel is also widely carried on Mediacom cable in several areas within and just outside the Bowling Green DMA. These include areas of Butler, Edmonson, Hart, and Metcalfe counties, as well as the northwest Barren County city of Park City. WKYU-TV is also available on via channel 7 on WesternCable, WKU's cable system available to all classrooms and residence halls on campus.

=== Out-of-market coverage ===
In the neighboring Nashville DMA (home territory to fellow PBS member stations WNPT and Cookeville, Tennessee's WCTE), it is available to Mediacom customers in Clinton, Cumberland (including Burkesville), and Monroe counties, and for all SCRTC customers in the cooperative's service area regardless of location. WKYU is also available to Suddenlink Communications (now Optimum) cable customers in Logan County (including Russellville). Subscribers of North Central Telephone Cooperative Cable in Allen County and into Macon County, Tennessee, including Lafayette and Red Boiling Springs, are served by WKYU-TV, as well as the respective subchannels of WNPT and KET affiliate WKGB-TV.

WKYU is also carried on cable systems in the far southern portions of the Louisville DMA, including parts of Grayson, Green, and Larue counties, along with southern portions of Hardin County, including Upton and Sonora.

WKYU is also available on cable systems in Muhlenberg and Ohio counties in northwest Kentucky, in the Evansville, Indiana, DMA, home territory to fellow PBS member station WNIN), including Comcast Xfinity in the Greenville/Central City area, and on Spectrum systems in the Beaver Dam/Hartford area.
