= WWHR =

Radio station in Bowling Green, Kentucky

WWHR-FM
- Bowling Green, Kentucky; United States
- Broadcast area: Bowling Green
- Frequency: 91.7 MHz
- Branding: Revolution 91.7

Programming
- Format: Adult album alternative

Ownership
- Owner: Western Kentucky University
- Sister stations: WKYU-TV, WKYU-FM

History
- First air date: August 17, 1988

Technical information
- Facility ID: 71863
- Class: A
- ERP: 1,300 watts
- HAAT: 114.0 meters (374 feet)
- Transmitter coordinates: 37°0′19.2″N 86°31′23″W

Links
- Website: revolution917.com

WWHR-FM (91.7 FM) is a radio station serving Bowling Green, Kentucky, United States. The station is currently owned by Western Kentucky University.

== History ==
WWHR-FM debuted on August 17, 1988, under the name New Rock 92 managed by associate professor Bart White. The station served primarily as an academic broadcasting lab housed in the Academic Complex transmitting from the residence hall Pearce-Ford Tower with 100 watts of power. New Rock 92's signal covered a five-mile radius.

This changed in 2001 when broadcasting instructor, Dr. Marjorie Yambor, became general manager of the station. Dr. Yambor transformed the simple broadcast lab into a competitive station. This began by rebranding the station as Revolution 91.7, along with newly constructed studio spaces, a new tower and a boost in effective radiated power to 1,300 watts, expanding the station's broadcast radius to about thirty miles. Following the transmitter upgrade in 2002, WWHR began a 24-hour programming schedule (with the exception of winter breaks and technical issues).

In 2015, Yambor left the position of general manager. While the university searched for a replacement, broadcasting instructors Victoria LaPoe and Jeanine Cherry fulfilled interim management duties, alongside student managers Angela Conway and Taylor Hodgkins overseeing day-to-day operations.

In 2016, former Nashville Public Radio employee Emil Moffat was named general manager fulfilling the management duties for both WWHR and WKYU-FM.

WWHR switched to an adult album alternative format in late 2017, coinciding with new on-air branding and an updated logo.

== Annual events ==
Each year, Revolution 91.7 brings two charity music festivals to Bowling Green. During the fall semester, Revolution 91.7 presents RevFest - an on-campus music festival and competition featuring various musical acts in the community. The station also hosts another festival in the spring known as Mayhem. Unlike RevFest, it is held off-campus and usually features bigger names in the local and regional area as well as a national scale headliner. Many businesses in the area and organizations also attend, featuring booths in support of the event, or offering goods and services.

== Programming ==
The programming at Revolution 91.7 is known for its diversity. Music selections are made by the student operators and directors considering current college radio selections as well as local bands and student preferences. In addition to providing music throughout the day, Revolution 91.7 also offers News and Sports programming along with Student-conceived genre-specific specialty shows every evening from 10 pm to Midnight Central Time.

== News and talk programming ==
Unlike the station's specialty programming, News and Talk programming is not hosted by the station's regular deejays. These programs are written, produced, and conducted by Broadcasting students of the university as class projects, allowing students of journalism and news to receive hands on experience in program production.

- News 91.7 - Weekdays at the bottom of the hours 7-10 am and 3-6 pm - News
- Revolution 91.7 Platform - Monday and Thursday 7 to 7:30 pm - Student life, Talk
- The Red Zone - Wednesday 6 to 7 pm - Sports analysis/forum

== See also ==
- Campus radio
- List of college radio stations in the United States
