= WULF =

Radio station in Hardinsburg, Kentucky, United States

- Hardinsburg, Kentucky; United States
- Broadcast area: Louisville metropolitan area (southwest suburbs)
- Frequency: 94.3 MHz
- Branding: 94.3 The Wolf

Programming
- Format: Country music
- Affiliations: Premiere Radio Networks; Westwood One

Ownership
- Owner: Skytower Communications - 94.3, LLC
- Sister stations: WQXE

History
- First air date: June 9, 1970
- Former call signs: WHIC-FM (1979–1995)
- Call sign meaning: "Wolf"

Technical information
- Licensing authority: FCC
- Facility ID: 25799
- Class: C2
- ERP: 40,000 watts
- HAAT: 160 meters (520 ft)
- Transmitter coordinates: 37°52′18″N 86°16′4″W
- Repeater: 104.5 W283AK (Elizabethtown)

Links
- Public license information: Public file; LMS
- Webcast: Listen live
- Website: wolf943.com

WULF (94.3 FM) is a commercial radio station licensed to Hardinsburg, Kentucky, United States, and serving the southwest suburbs of the Louisville metropolitan area. Owned by Skytower Communications - 94.3, LLC, it features a country music format branded as "94.3 The Wolf". Studios are located on West Dixie Avenue in Elizabethtown.

The transmitter is on Sam Dowell Road in Irvington, Kentucky. Programming is also heard on 160-watt FM translator W283AK at 104.5 MHz in Elizabethtown.

== History ==
The station signed on the air on June 9, 1970. Its original call sign was WHIC-FM, the sister station of WHIC 1520 AM, which began broadcasting in 1968. The stations were simulcast and owned by Breckinridge County Broadcasting. WHIC 1520 AM had come on the air two years earlier as a daytimer, required to go off the air at night. For listeners with FM radios, WHIC-FM was able to continue the stations' programming past sunset.

WHIC-AM-FM aired a full service format of local news and information, sports, country music and middle of the road music. In its early years, WHIC-FM was powered at 3,000 watts, a fraction of its current output. It could only be heard in Hardinsburg and adjacent communities.

In 1982, both WHIC 1520 and WHIC-FM 94.3 were acquired by Key Broadcasting, with Terry Forcht as president. On May 24, 1995, WHIC-FM changed its call sign to the current WULF, and was rebranded as "The Wolf." It got a boost in power to 50,000 watts, extending its coverage to communities south and west of Louisville. WHIC 1520 was later taken silent.

In January 2002, the station was purchased by current owner Skytower Communications, which at that time was presided by then-Kentucky Broadcasters Association president Bill Evans. A few years later, the station would sign on translator W273AK (104.5 FM) to serve the Elizabethtown area.

== On-air staff ==
The Wolf features mornings with Jimmy Wilson, middays with Kevin Jaggers and afternoons with Bobby Jack Murphy.

== Translators ==
In addition to the main station, WULF is relayed by an additional translator to widen its broadcast area.

Call sign	Frequency	City of license	FID	ERP (W)	Class	FCC info
W283AK	104.5 FM	Elizabethtown, Kentucky	157964	160	D	LMS
