= WMMG-FM =

- Brandenburg, Kentucky; United States
- Frequency: 93.5 MHz
- Branding: 93.5 WMMG

Programming
- Format: Variety
- Affiliations: Meade County High School

Ownership
- Owner: Chris McGehee; (Meade County Communications, Inc.)

History
- First air date: August 1972
- Former call signs: WMMG (1972–1984)
- Call sign meaning: Medley Myers Greer (Stockholders in original owner)

Technical information
- Licensing authority: FCC
- Facility ID: 40928
- Class: A
- ERP: 3,400 watts
- HAAT: 88.0 meters
- Transmitter coordinates: 37°59′05″N 86°09′24″W

Links
- Public license information: Public file; LMS
- Webcast: Listen Live
- Website: wmmgradio.com

WMMG-FM (93.5 FM) is a variety–formatted radio station licensed to Brandenburg, Kentucky, United States. The station is currently owned by local Chris McGehee under the licensee Meade County Communications, Inc. The station's studios and transmitter facilities are located on KY 313 (Bypass Road) on the southwest side of Brandenburg.

== History ==
WMMG signed on-the-air in August 1972. Just two years later, the station was destroyed by an F5 tornado during the 1974 Super Outbreak, which would be the only F5 tornado in Kentucky history. Following the disaster, WMMG operated from temporary studios at Meade County High School with a short antenna of 15 feet (4.6 m) in height until rebuilding.

The station was joined by a new daytime-only AM companion station, WMMG at 1140 kHz, in 1984. At that time, the FM station's call letters added an "-FM" suffix. WMMG-FM was sold to Chris McGehee ten years later. The AM companion station, WMMG, was deleted in 2019.

== Programming ==
WMMG's format is variety. They currently broadcast a mix of music including country, pop, classic rock and Christian praise and worship music. They also have a daily call-in talk show called "Edgewise" and they air local news reports and Meade County High School basketball and football games.
