= WWKU =

Radio station in Plum Springs, Kentucky

- Plum Springs, Kentucky; United States
- Broadcast area: Greater Bowling Green area
- Frequency: 1450 kHz
- Branding: 98 Jamz

Programming
- Format: Rhythmic throwbacks
- Affiliations: Hilltopper Sports Network; Titans Radio Network; Cincinnati Reds Radio Network

Ownership
- Owner: Seven Mountains Media; (Southern Belle Bowling Green LLC)
- Sister stations: W240CP; WBVR; WBVR-FM; WOVO; WPTQ; WUHU; WKLX

History
- First air date: October 1, 1962 (as WCDS at 1440)
- Last air date: November 2026
- Former call signs: WCDS (1962–2007)
- Former frequencies: 1440 kHz (1962–2008)
- Call sign meaning: Western Kentucky University

Technical information
- Licensing authority: FCC
- Facility ID: 70869
- Class: C
- Power: 1,000 watts
- Transmitter coordinates: 37°0′37.2″N 86°25′26″W
- Translators: 98.1 W251BT (Glasgow); 98.3 W252CV (Bowling Green); 102.7 W274CD (Plum Springs)
- Repeater: 105.3 WPTQ-HD2 (Glasgow)

Links
- Public license information: Public file; LMS
- Webcast: Listen live
- Website: thepointrocks.com

WWKU (1450 AM) was a radio station licensed to Plum Springs, Kentucky, United States, and serving the greater Bowling Green area. The station was owned by Seven Mountains Media. The station shared studios on McIntosh Street near US 231 on the south side of Bowling Green, and its transmitter was located off US 68/KY 80 adjacent to the Barren River northeast of downtown.

In addition to its AM signal, WWKU also operated three translator stations on the FM band: Glasgow–licensed W251BT (98.1 MHz), Bowling Green–licensed W252CV (98.3 MHz), and Plum Springs–licensed W274CD (102.7 MHz). The station was also simulcast over the second HD Radio channel of Glasgow–licensed WPTQ (105.3 MHz).

== History ==
=== Early days (1962–1989) ===
The station, originally licensed to Glasgow, signed on the air as the original WCDS at 1440 kHz on October 1, 1962. It was originally locally owned by the Barrick family, with John Barrick as the president of the station. Operating the station alongside wife Sarah, the station was named after her and their four children, using the first letter of each of their names—Christy, Cindy, David, and Danny. John Barrick was the news anchor for the station; he even owned his own helicopter for news coverage purposes.

In 1972, when WOVO was launched, block programming and the variety of music previously aired on WCDS was moved to the new FM station, with WCDS becoming a country music station. During the 1970s, the station's news department won seven Associated Press awards for excellence.

=== The 1990s and early 2000s ===
WCDS and WOVO were both purchased by Ward Communications in March 1991, the sale was finalized on December 26 of that year. In spring 1991, WCDS' studios were heavily damaged by a tornado, and has never returned to the air until sometime in 1998. In 1997, WOVO and the silent WCDS was purchased by Commonwealth Broadcasting Corporation. When it returned to the air in 1998, it was an AM simulcast of WOVO. In 2002, WCDS began broadcasting a sports format as an affiliate of ESPN Radio.

=== Sale to Newberry Broadcasting and relocation to Bowling Green ===
In 2007, after being purchased by Newberry Communications (now Commonwealth Broadcasting), the station call letters were changed to become WWKU. During that same year, the WCDS calls were reassigned to another station in the area that broadcasts at 1230 kilohertz, and previously held the WWKU calls since its 2005 sign-on. WWKU changed its frequency to the current 1450 kHz in May 2008 to allow for an upgrade to a stronger signal of 1,000 watts day and night (compared with the 500 watts day and 30 watts night it previously had). In addition, WWKU's broadcasting license was moved to the Bowling Green suburb of Plum Springs, where it remains today.

=== Launch of an FM translator ===
In 2015, WWKU launched an FM translator, W274BQ (102.7 MHz, now W274CD), licensed to Bowling Green. That translator repeats WWKU's AM signal from a tower located somewhere within the campus of Western Kentucky University in downtown Bowling Green. The station later launched a second translator, W222CD (92.3 MHz) in Franklin.

=== Sale to Seven Mountains Media; shutdown ===
In October 2024, Commonwealth Broadcasting and Seven Mountains Media agreed to a station swap of several stations in the Bowling Green, and Glasgow, Kentucky area (including this station, W240CP, WOVO, and WPTQ). On March 20, 2025, WWKU changed its format from sports to active rock, branded as "102.7 The Point"; this marked the beginning of a simulcast with WPTQ-HD2 and that station's translators W251BT (98.1 MHz) of Glasgow, and W252CV (98.3 MHz) of Bowling Green, all of which were branded as "98.3 The Edge".

On July 24, 2026, at 5:00 p.m., after playing "Happy Trails" by Van Halen, WWKU began stunting with a "wheel of formats", with the first format being classical music. On July 27, 2026, WWKU ended stunting and launched a rhythmic throwbacks format, branded as "98 Jamz".

The Federal Communications Commission cancelled the WWKU license on November 5, 2026; "98 Jamz" continues on WPTQ-HD2 and the translators.

== Sports programming ==
The station served as an affiliate of the following sports networks

- Tennessee Titans Radio Network
- Cincinnati Reds Radio Network
- Hilltopper IMG Sports Network (football and baseball only)

== Translator stations ==
WWKU operated two translator stations in south central Kentucky:

Broadcast translators for WWKU
| Call sign | Frequency | City of license | FID | ERP (W) | HAAT | Class | Transmitter coordinates | FCC info |
|---|---|---|---|---|---|---|---|---|
| W274CD | 102.7 FM | Plum Springs, Kentucky | 200109 | 250 | 47 m (154 ft) | D | 36°59′8.1″N 86°27′8.9″W | LMS |
| W222CZ | 92.3 FM | Franklin, Kentucky | 156061 | 220 | 66 m (217 ft) | D | 36°45′56.6″N 86°34′2.6″W | LMS |
