= WLBJ (Kentucky) =

Radio station in Bowling Green, Kentucky, United States (1940–1991)

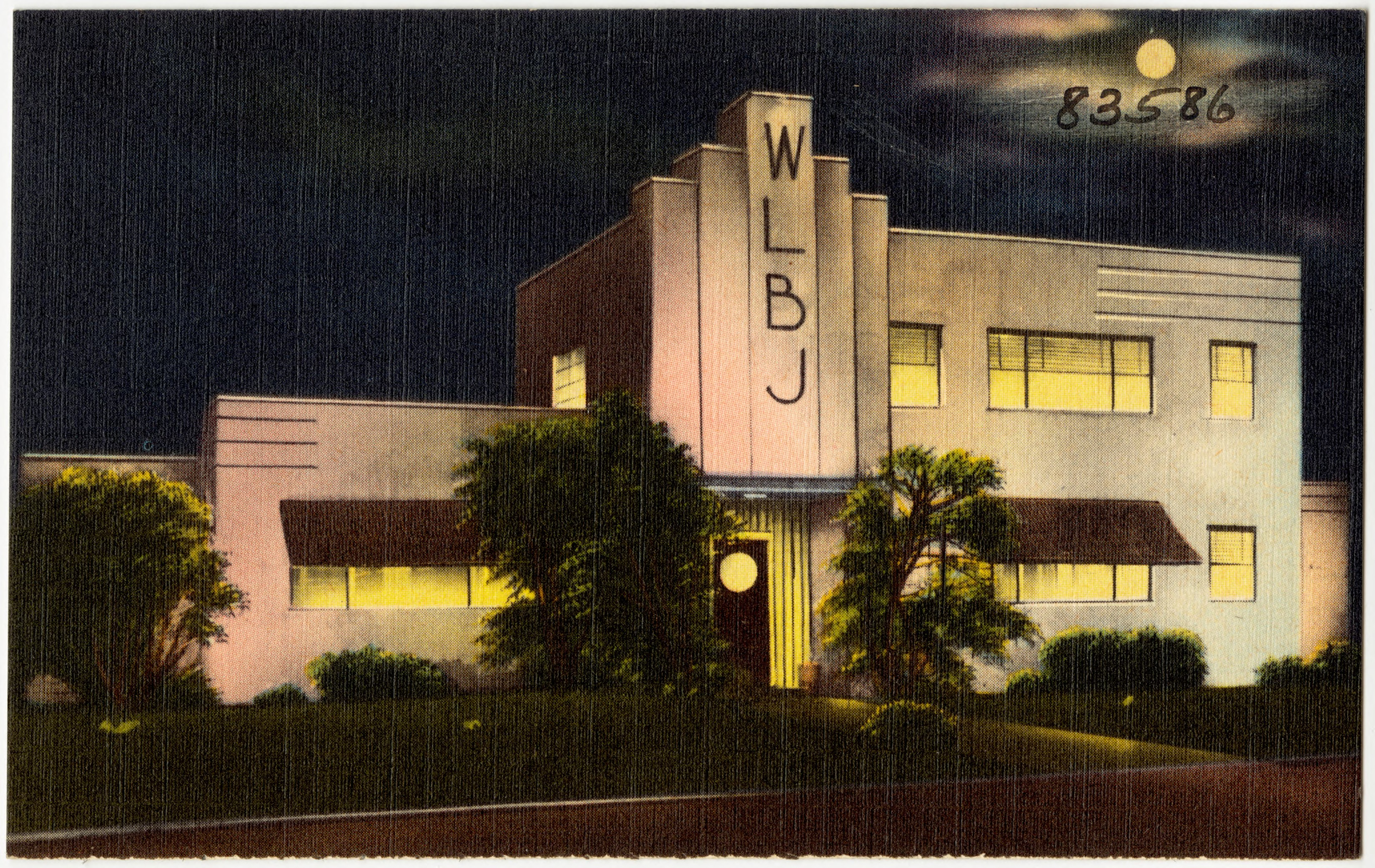
- Bowling Green, Kentucky; United States
- Broadcast area: Bowling Green, Kentucky
- Frequencies: 1340 kHz (1940–1950); 1410 kHz (1950–1991)

Ownership
- Owner: Bahakel Communications; (Bowling Green Broadcasters, Inc.)

History
- First air date: June 25, 1940
- Last air date: December 6, 1991

Technical information
- Facility ID: 6562
- Power: 5,000 watts (daytime); 1,000 watts (nighttime)

WLBJ was the first commercial radio station in Bowling Green, Kentucky, signing-on in June 1940. The station operated at 1410 kHz for much of its existence.

== History ==
WLBJ began broadcasting on June 25, 1940, under ownership of Bowling Green Broadcasting Company. The callsign stood for its founder L.B. Jenkins, who put the station on the air. The station originally operated at a frequency of 1340 kHz. The station originally broadcast at a power of 250 watts during the first years on the air. The station was Bowling Green's first commercial radio station since the failure of the short-lived WNAB, which was operated by the Park City News (the precursor to the Bowling Green Daily News) from September 1922 through June 1923.

In the early days of WLBJ, the station's studios were located at the intersection of Fairview Avenue and Lehman Avenue in Bowling Green, and would later relocate both the studios and transmitter to its final location of 689 Scott Lane, in what is now known as the Indian Ridge Subdivision, adjacent to the present-day Indian Hills Country Club.

In 1950, WLBJ moved its signal to its final frequency at 1410 kHz. The station was purchased by Cy N. Bahakel, owner of Bahakel Communications (originally of Roanoke, Virginia, now based in Charlotte, North Carolina), for a price of $60,000, in 1955, with the new owner taking control of the station on January 1, 1956.

From its beginning, and even into its later years, the station was well known as a favorite among country music fans in south-central Kentucky and northern middle Tennessee. By the 1960s, it had an effective daytime power of 5,000 watts (1,000 watts directional at night).

=== FM companion ===
From 1965 through the early 1980s, the WLBJ call letters were also assigned to sister station WLBJ-FM, operating at 96.7 megahertz under the brands "Natural 97" (album-oriented rock) under the program direction lead of Jay Preston, Greg Pogue, and later Dean Warfield, and later an automated "BJ 97" (adult contemporary). The call letters of the FM station were changed in the mid-1980s to WCBZ. Today, the 96.7 frequency is owned and operated by Bowling Green-based country music station, WOVO.

=== The final years (1985–1991) ===
In 1986, WLBJ was forced off the air by a brush fire that destroyed broadcast equipment at its transmitter site, but the studio building was not harmed.

WLBJ permanently signed off the air on December 6, 1991. The last known format it was broadcasting was an easy listening format before its closure. General manager Dean Maggard explained that the station was being shut down due to economic reasons.

=== Post-existence ===
In recent years, the iconic call letters were reassigned to an AM station operating at 1570 kHz in the Louisville suburb of New Albany, Indiana. That station has since changed its call letters. The callsign also existed on a now-defunct low-power FM station in Fostoria, Ohio.

== Programming ==
Among the more significant local programs it produced were the 4 O'Clock Special, hosted by disc jockeys G. W. Boyum in 1947 and Brad Taylor in 1950, The Smilemaker, a morning and afternoon drive program featuring cuts from comedy albums by popular comedians, and Opinion Line, an Associated Press award-winning local public affairs program hosted by newscaster Mike Green in the 1980s.

The station was also known as one of the earliest and longest-running affiliates of the now-defunct Mutual Broadcasting System, and also carried Mutual's The Larry King Show, which was broadcast overnight during the early 1980s, making the station Bowling Green's first 24-hour radio operation.

The station also became well known for using their cowboy "boot" (Kentucky Kountry King) logo and 30-second jingle in the station's television advertisements which aired on ABC television affiliate WBKO. In return, 30-second spots advertising WBKO's evening news stories were aired over the radio station.

One of the station's most popular programs later in the station's life was the 1981 launch of the Wrangler Country Showdown, a live-broadcast country music talent search which preceded such current programs as American Idol by some 20 years.

=== National news programs ===
The station broadcast national news updates from The Christian Science Monitor news service during the 1980s.

=== Sports programming ===
The station was an affiliate of Cincinnati Reds baseball and the University of Kentucky football/basketball networks. The station was also known for live broadcasts of horse racing events at Keeneland Race Course in Lexington.
