= WLEZ (FM) =

- Lebanon Junction, Kentucky; United States
- Broadcast area: Louisville metropolitan area
- Frequency: 99.3 MHz

Programming
- Format: Christian AC
- Network: K-Love

Ownership
- Owner: Educational Media Foundation

History
- First air date: October 17, 1979
- Former call signs: WOKH (1978–2002); WTHX (2002–2008); WKMO (2008–2022); WLEZ-FM (2022)

Technical information
- Licensing authority: FCC
- Facility ID: 48245
- Class: A
- ERP: 6,000 watts
- HAAT: 95.0 meters (311.7 ft)
- Transmitter coordinates: 37°44′26″N 85°49′28″W

Links
- Public license information: Public file; LMS
- Website: https://www.klove.com

WLEZ (99.3 FM) is a radio station branded as K-Love, a non-commercial Christian adult contemporary radio station format. Licensed to Lebanon Junction, Kentucky, United States, the station is currently owned by Educational Media Foundation.

== History ==
The station went on the air October 17, 1979, as WOKH on 96.7 MHz in Bardstown. Befitting its call letters, the first song played on the station was My Old Kentucky Home. The station was initially broadcasting an adult contemporary format, but it would later become a sports radio station. While an AC station, the station also aired large blocks of local news programming. In 1979, the station once broadcast then-U.S. President Jimmy Carter's town hall visit to Bardstown, and providing live feeds to other stations nationwide.

The station changed its call sign to WTHX on October 2, 2002. On August 4, 2008, the station changed its call sign to WKMO, and on June 18, 2022, it switched to WLEZ-FM.

In 2015, the station adopted the Nash Icon brand. It later reverted to its previous name of "KMO Country 99.3".

In 2022, Commonwealth Broadcasting filed to sell WKMO, which was renamed WLEZ-FM before the sale, to the Educational Media Foundation for $410,000. WKMO's programming and call sign moved to the former WVKB at 101.5 MHz. On November 1, the last song on WKMO was “Country Girl (Shake It For Me) by Luke Bryan”. The sale to Educational Media Foundation was consummated on November 1, 2022, and the station changed its call sign to WLEZ on November 10, 2022..

== Former logo ==
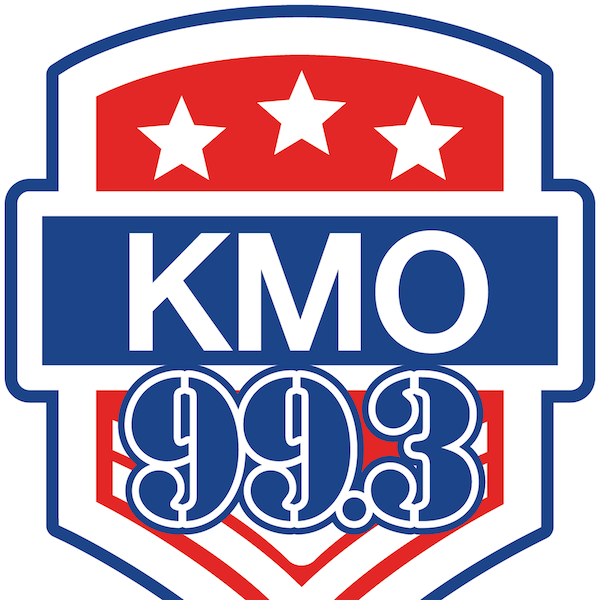
Previous logo 2019–2022
