= WBVR-FM =

Radio station in Horse Cave, Kentucky

- Horse Cave, Kentucky; United States
- Broadcast area: Bowling Green metropolitan area
- Frequency: 106.3 MHz (HD Radio)
- Branding: Beaver 106.3

Programming
- Format: Country
- Subchannels: HD2: Classic hip hop "95.9 The Vibe"; HD3: Classical "Classical 97.5"

Ownership
- Owner: Seven Mountains Media; (Southern Belle Bowling Green LLC)
- Sister stations: WBVR; WOVO; WPTQ; WUHU; WKLX

History
- First air date: September 19, 1994; 32 years ago
- Former call signs: WLMK (1991–1993); WXPC (1993–1998); WHHT (1998–2012); WOVO (2012–2025)
- Former frequencies: 106.7 MHz (1994–2008); 106.5 MHz (2008–2012)
- Call sign meaning: "Beaver"

Technical information
- Licensing authority: FCC
- Facility ID: 48702
- Class: C2
- ERP: 50,000 watts
- HAAT: 123 meters (404 ft)
- Transmitter coordinates: 37°02′39.2″N 86°10′59.9″W
- Translators: HD2: 95.9 W240CP (Bowling Green); HD3: 97.3 W247DM (Glasgow); HD3: 97.5 W248CF (Bowling Green)

Links
- Public license information: Public file; LMS
- Webcast: Listen live; HD2: Listen live
- Website: beaverfm.com; HD2: 959thevibe.com

WBVR-FM (106.3 MHz) is a country music–formatted radio station licensed to Horse Cave, Kentucky, United States, and serving the Bowling Green metropolitan area. The station is currently owned by Seven Mountains Media.

The station's studios, shared with Brownsville–licensed WKLX and Glasgow–licensed WPTQ (also owned by Seven Mountains Media), are located on Scottsville Road (U.S. 231) on the south side of Bowling Green. WBVR's transmitter is located on Pine Knob along U.S. Route 68 (US 68) near Smiths Grove, Kentucky, sharing tower space with NBC/CBS/MeTV dual affiliate WNKY (channel 40) and Ion Television affiliate WNKY-LD (channel 35).

== History ==
=== The early years ===
The station's construction permit, for 106.7 MHz in Horse Cave, was issued under the callsign WLMK in 1991. The callsign was changed to WXPC in 1993; it first signed on the air on September 19, 1994. It began broadcasting as an oldies–formatted station.

=== Sale to Commonwealth Broadcasting and first changeover to AC ===
In 1997, the station, along with WHHT, WOVO, WCDS, and four other stations in Kentucky, were acquired by a new business venture named Commonwealth Broadcasting Corporation, formed by Steve Newberry and former Kentucky governor Brereton C. Jones. On October 23, 1998, the station took on the WHHT call sign and adult contemporary format from 103.7 MHz, which became classic rock station WPTQ. (Note: The 103.7 facility, as WHHT, had itself operated on 106.7 from 1988 to 1991.)

=== 2000s ===
Until 2005, WHHT broadcast a variety hits format as Sam FM, airing the syndicated network S.A.M.: Simply About Music from Westwood One. In November 2005, the Sam FM format moved to Brownsville-licensed WKLX (100.7 FM). For the next six years, WHHT broadcast a hot adult contemporary format under the branding Star FM. In 2008, upgrades at Cumulus Media–owned WNFN (106.7 FM, licensed to Millersville, Tennessee) in the Nashville metropolitan area resulted in WHHT shifting to 106.5 MHz. A format switch to country music occurred sometime in 2010.

=== Three-way frequency swap ===
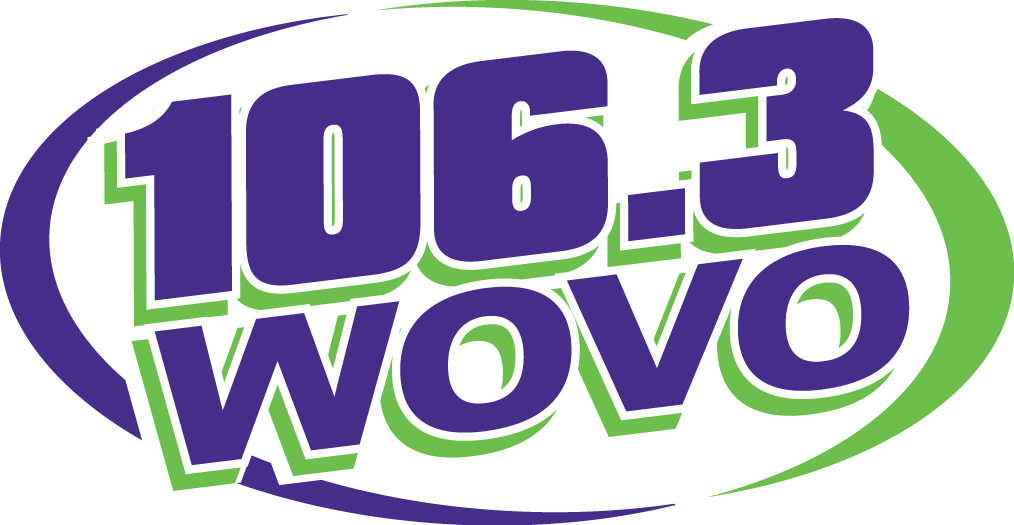
Logo as WOVO

In October 2012, Commonwealth Broadcasting instituted a major three-way frequency and FCC license change. WHHT upgraded its signal in a move to 106.3 MHz, which would be traded to WOVO, which moved its adult contemporary format from 105.3 FM. WHHT's country music format was relocated to the 103.7 FM frequency, which that station previously broadcast on from 1991 through 1998; WPTQ and its classic rock programming would replace WOVO on 105.3.

=== Sale to Seven Mountains Media ===
In October 2024, Commonwealth Broadcasting and Seven Mountains Media agreed to a station swap of several stations in Bowling Green, and Glasgow, Kentucky.

=== Stunting, "Wheel of Formats," and Beaver branding ===
On November 18, 2024, WOVO dropped its hot adult contemporary format and began stunting with Christmas music, branded as "North Pole Radio". On December 27, the stunt was changed to a "Wheel of Formats", with sweepers redirecting listeners to WUHU; it also ran promos for the move of the "Beaver" country music programming of WBVR-FM from 96.7 to 106.3, and the forthcoming launch of Seven Mountain's "Bigfoot Legends" classic country format on 96.7. On January 10, 2025, 106.3 became WBVR-FM, and began simulcasting on WBVR (1340 AM and 94.5 FM), replacing oldies station WBGN; the WOVO call sign moved to 96.7.

== Programming ==
=== HD Radio ===
The station's HD radio signal is multiplexed in this manner.

Freqnency (MHz-subchannel)	Callsign	Programming
106.3FM; 106.3-1 HD	WBVR-FM; WBVR-HD1	Simulcast of the traditional FM signal "Beaver 106.3" / Country
106.3-2 HD	WBVR-HD2	W240CP / "95.9 The Vibe"; Classic hip hop
106.3-3 HD	WBVR-HD3	W248CF / "Classical 97.5"; Classical

=== W240CP ===
W240CP (95.9 MHz) is a low-power radio station translator in Bowling Green, Kentucky and is owned by Seven Mountains Media. It airs a classic hip hop format that simulcasts a second HD Radio subchannel of parent station WBVR-FM, which is licensed to Horse Cave, but also serves Bowling Green and Glasgow. The translator's transmitter is located near Rockfield.

Call sign	Frequency	City of license	FID	ERP (W)	Class	Transmitter coordinates	FCC info
W240CP	95.9 FM	Bowling Green, Kentucky	139196	250	D	36°57′37″N 86°32′49″W	LMS

==== History ====
WOVO launched the station on a HD2 subchannel in 2015. At the time of the launch, most radio users did not have an HD Radio set, so the subchannel has been simulcasting over two translators, W239BT (95.7 MHz) of Glasgow, and W240CP in Bowling Green; both were launched in April 2015. On March 21, 2018, W240CP rebranded as "95.9 The Vibe".

The simulcast between the two translators ended on November 18, 2024, when W239BT became a separate entity; that station would later become a translator of WLLI (102.3 MHz, now WBGN) of Munfordville, Kentucky.

==== Signal coverage ====
The translator station can be received on a regular radio tuner in all parts of Warren and Simpson Counties, along with much of neighboring Allen, Butler, Edmonson, and Logan Counties. The small community of Mitchellville, Tennessee can also receive at least Grade C coverage. An HD radio set is necessary to receive the HD2 subchannel anywhere within WBVR-FM's signal coverage area. W239BT expands the analog radio coverage into Barren, Hart, Metcalfe, and Monroe Counties in southern Kentucky.
