= WOVO (FM) =

Radio stations in Auburn, Kentucky

- Auburn, Kentucky; United States
- Broadcast area: Bowling Green metropolitan area
- Frequency: 96.7 MHz
- Branding: Bigfoot Legends 96.7 FM

Programming
- Format: Country
- Affiliations: Bigfoot Legends; Compass Media Networks

Ownership
- Owner: Seven Mountains Media; (Southern Belle Media Family, LLC)
- Sister stations: W240CP; WBVR; WBVR-FM; WPTQ; WUHU; WKLX

History
- First air date: May 1965
- Former call signs: WLBJ-FM (1965–1987); WCBZ (1987–1992); WBZD (1992–1993); WMJM (1993–1994); WBVR-FM (1994–2025)

Technical information
- Licensing authority: FCC
- Facility ID: 71244
- Class: C2
- ERP: 45,000 watts
- HAAT: 129 metres (423 ft)
- Transmitter coordinates: 36°50′35″N 86°15′30″W
- Repeater: 106.3 WBVR-FM HD2 (Horse Cave)

Links
- Public license information: Public file; LMS
- Webcast: Listen live
- Website: bigfootlegendsky.com

WOVO (96.7 MHz) is a country music–formatted radio station licensed to Auburn, Kentucky, United States, and serving the Bowling Green metropolitan area. The station is owned by Seven Mountains Media. The station share studios on Scottsville Road in southern Bowling Green, and the station's transmitter is located in northwestern Allen County just east of Alvaton.

== History ==
=== As WLBJ-FM (1963–1987) ===
On December 11, 1963, Bowling Green Broadcasters, Inc., a subsidiary of Bahakel Communications and owner of WLBJ (1410 AM), received a construction permit to build a new FM radio station in Bowling Green on 96.7 MHz. WLBJ-FM began broadcasting in May 1965. This was the first time WLBJ had offered an FM service since the early 1950s, when it owned WBON, later WLBJ-FM.

By the late 1970s, the station was airing an album-oriented rock format known as "Natural 97 FM". This shifted to contemporary hit radio "BJ-97" in 1980.

=== Final years of Bahakel ownership (1987–1992) ===
In 1987, the station's callsign was changed to WCBZ, resulting in the rebranding to "Z-97".

In 1991, Bahakel announced it would sell WCBZ to Target Communications; it retained the AM, which it opted to shut down for good in December, with the FM station remaining silent until Target completed the sale.

=== As a mainstream rock station (1992–1994) ===
After an upgrade to 25,000 watts, WCBZ returned to the air in 1992 as rock station WBZD "Buzzard 96.7". The format then changed again when the station rebranded itself "Magic" with the callsign changing to WMJM in 1993.

=== As the "Beaver" (1994–2025) ===
In July 1994, the Beaver brand and format moved to WMJM, which became the new WBVR-FM, and to a second station, WVVR (100.3 MHz) in Hopkinsville. Keymarket Communications, which shared some ownership with Target, had simultaneously acquired the previous Beaver station, 101.1 MHz from Russellville, along with WLAC and WLAC-FM in Nashville; the Beaver move freed up the 101.1 facility to gear itself toward Nashville as R&B-formatted WJCE-FM "The Juice".

The 25,000-watt upgrade was finally approved in 2001; as a result, the city of license for the station was changed from Bowling Green to Auburn, Kentucky.

In an unknown year, the station was bought by Forever Communications.

=== Seven Mountains Media acquisition ===
In September 2023, it was announced that Seven Mountains Media would acquire four Forever Communications stations in the Bowling Green area for just over $1.1 million. The other stations include WBGN, WLYE-FM, and WUHU.

=== Frequency swap with WBVR-FM, and Bigfoot Country (2025–present) ===
On January 10, 2025, Seven Mountains Media moved WBVR-FM to 106.3, formerly WOVO; the WOVO call sign moved to 96.7, which moved to a classic country format using Seven Mountains' "Bigfoot Legends" branding.
