= WVFB =

- Celina, Tennessee; United States
- Frequency: 101.5 MHz
- Branding: KIX Country

Programming
- Format: Country

Ownership
- Owner: Jonathan Keeton; (Frank Keeton Aircasters, Inc.)
- Sister stations: WKWY, WTKY-AM, WTKY-FM

Technical information
- Licensing authority: FCC
- Facility ID: 19247
- Class: A
- ERP: 6,000 watts
- HAAT: 100.0 meters (328.1 ft)
- Transmitter coordinates: 36°33′28.00″N 85°36′15.00″W

Links
- Public license information: Public file; LMS

WVFB (101.5 FM, "KIX Country") is a radio station broadcasting a country music format. Licensed to Celina, Tennessee, United States, the station is currently owned by Jonathan Keeton, through licensee Frank Keeton Aircasters, Inc.
