= WRZI =

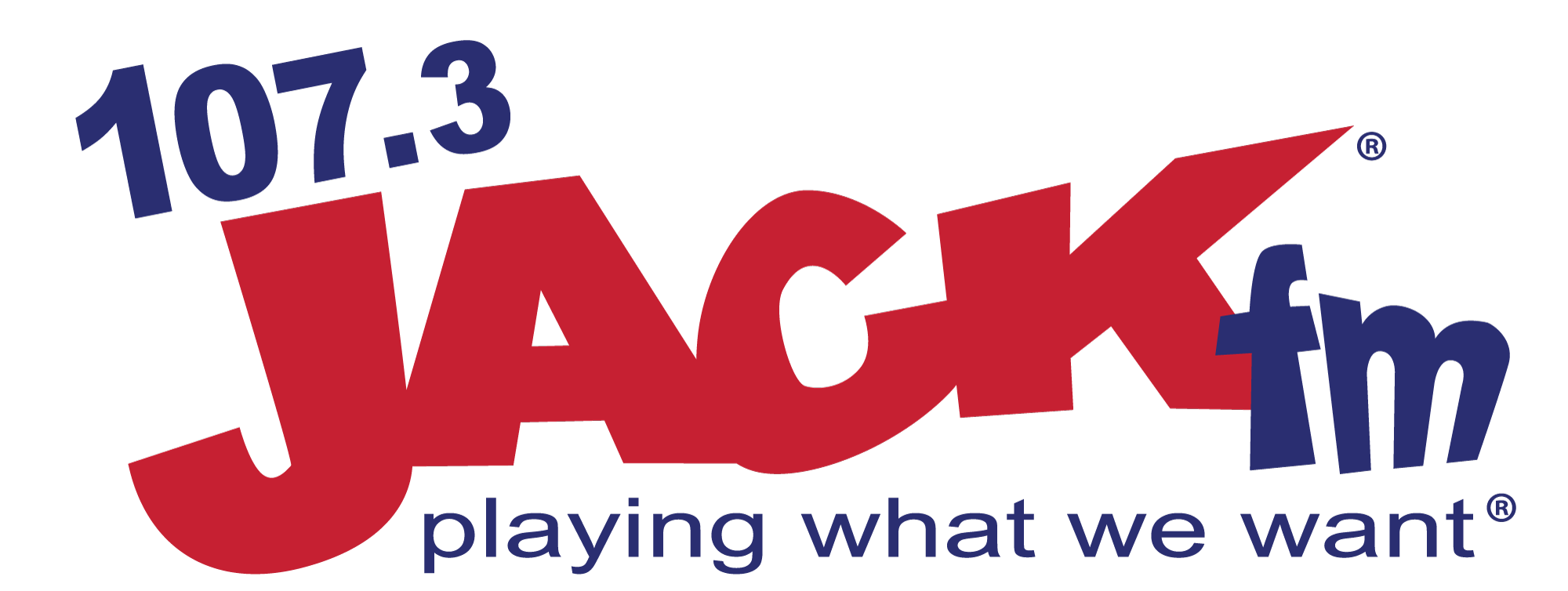
- Hodgenville, Kentucky; United States
- Frequency: 107.3 MHz
- Branding: 107.3 Jack FM

Programming
- Format: Adult hits

Ownership
- Owner: Commonwealth Broadcasting; (Elizabethtown CBC, Inc.)
- Sister stations: WIEL, WKMO-FM

History
- First air date: March 1974 (as WKMO at 106.3)
- Former call signs: WKMO (1974-2008); WTHX (2008-2009)
- Former frequencies: 106.3 MHz (1974-?)

Technical information
- Licensing authority: FCC
- Facility ID: 19354
- Class: A
- ERP: 3,800 watts
- HAAT: 128 meters
- Transmitter coordinates: 37°40′21″N 85°44′34″W

Links
- Public license information: Public file; LMS
- Webcast: Listen Live
- Website: WRZI Online

WRZI (107.3 FM) is a radio station broadcasting an adult hits format under Jack FM branding. Licensed to Hodgenville, Kentucky, United States. The station is currently owned by Elizabethtown Cbc, Inc.

In September 2024, the station flipped from classic rock to an adult hits format under Jack FM branding.

== Previous logo ==
(WRZI logo under previous 101.5 frequency)
