= WKLX =

Radio station in Brownsville, Kentucky

WKLX and WKYY

WKLX: Brownsville, Kentucky; WKYY: Beaver Dam, Kentucky; United States
- Broadcast area: WKLX: Bowling Green metropolitan area; WKYY: Southern Ohio and Butler Counties, Kentucky
- Frequencies: WKLX: 100.7 MHz; WKYY: 99.1 MHz
- Branding: BG 100.7

Programming
- Format: Classic hits
- Affiliations: Hilltopper Sports Network

Ownership
- Owner: Commonwealth Broadcasting; (Charles M. Anderson)
- Operator: Seven Mountains Media via LMA
- Sister stations: W240CP; WBVR; WBVR-FM; WOVO; WPTQ; WUHU

History
- First air date: WKLX: 2000; WKYY: June 15, 2011 (in Morgantown, Kentucky)
- Former call signs: WKLX: WAUE (1997–1998); WKYY: WWKN (2007–2023); WKYY (2023–2025); WBGN (2025)

Technical information
- Licensing authority: FCC
- Facility ID: WKLX: 10515; WKYY: 170956
- Class: WKLX: C2; WKYY: A
- ERP: WKLX: 16,000 watts; WKYY: 1,000 watts
- HAAT: WKLX: 184 meters (604 ft); WKYY: 88 meters (289 ft)
- Transmitter coordinates: WKLX: 37°9′19.2″N 86°19′32.9″W; WKYY: 37°21′37.8″N 86°48′14.3″W

Links
- Public license information: WKLX: Public file; LMS; WKYY: Public file; LMS
- Webcast: Listen live
- Website: bighitsbg.com

WKLX (100.7 FM) is a classic hits–formatted radio station licensed to Brownsville, Kentucky, United States, and serving the Bowling Green metropolitan area. The station is owned by Commonwealth Broadcasting and operated by Seven Mountains Media, under a local marketing agreement (LMA). The station's transmitter is located along Kentucky Route 1749 near the Wingfield community of southwestern Edmonson County; it was the only broadcasting station transmitting from that tower until March 2014, when it began sharing tower space with low-powered television station WCZU-LD.

In addition to its primary signal covering the greater Bowling Green area, WKLX operates a satellite station, WKYY (99.1 FM). Licensed to Beaver Dam, Kentucky, that station's transmitter is located on Bald Knob Road off US 231 in unincorporated southern Ohio County.

== History ==
=== WKLX history ===
The station signed on the air as WAUE on June 1, 1997. It switched to its current WKLX callsign on July 10, 1998, which is about 11 months and 9 days after its inception. It started broadcasting as an adult hits station using the branding 100.7 KLX. It was branded as Star 100.7 during the mid-2000s.

Logo used under the Sam 100.7 branding (2005–2025)

The current 100.7 Sam FM moniker was adopted in November 2005; along the way after changing their branding to Sam FM, the format changed formats to classic hits through the syndicated S.A.M.: Simply About Music program service from Westwood One originally held by WHHT (106.7 FM). After that service was discontinued, the Sam FM branding was kept even after the station began utilizing the Bob FM service at some point in the 2010s.

In October 2024, Commonwealth Broadcasting and Seven Mountains Media agreed to a station swap of several stations in Bowling Green, and Glasgow, Kentucky, including WKLX.

In April 2025, the station rebranded as BG 100.7.

=== WKYY history ===
WKYY, originally licensed to Morgantown, Kentucky, began as a construction permit on July 23, 2007, with the call sign WWKN, although it would not go on-the-air until 2011. Since its launch, it has served as a full-time satellite of WKLX. The station changed its call sign to WKYY on July 1, 2023, following that stations purchase by Charles Anderson, one of WKLX's previous owners, from Newberry Broadcasting. The new owner relocated WKYY's broadcast license to Beaver Dam, and elected to relocate its transmission facility to a tower just south of that city. WKYY previously transmitted from a tower along Kentucky Route 70 (Veterans Way) in Morgantown. The call sign was changed again, to WBGN, on February 15, 2025; this change was reversed on November 30, 2025; six days later, the WBGN call sign was reassigned to a Munfordville-licensed station as part of that station's rebranding.

== Programming ==
The station is the flagship station of Western Kentucky Hilltoppers basketball broadcasts from the Hilltopper Sports Network. WKLX, along with Plum Springs-licensed WWKU are co-flagships for that network's coverage of the university's football games.
