= WKMO-FM =

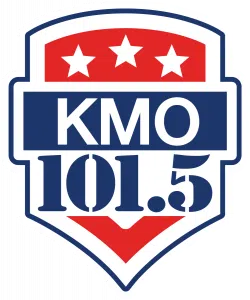
- Vine Grove, Kentucky; United States
- Frequency: 101.5 MHz
- Branding: 101.5 KMO

Programming
- Format: Country
- Affiliations: Country Music Countdown

Ownership
- Owner: Commonwealth Broadcasting; (Elizabethtown CBC, Inc.)
- Sister stations: WRZI

History
- First air date: 1993 (as WRZI)
- Former call signs: WRZI (1989–2009); WTHX (2009–2016); WVKB (2016–2022)

Technical information
- Licensing authority: FCC
- Facility ID: 36632
- Class: A
- ERP: 6,000 watts
- HAAT: 99 meters (325 ft)
- Transmitter coordinates: 37°43′05″N 86°00′59″W

Links
- Public license information: Public file; LMS
- Webcast: Listen Live
- Website: www.etownradio.com/wkmo-3/

WKMO-FM (101.5 FM, "101.5 KMO") is a radio station broadcasting a country music format. Licensed to Vine Grove, Kentucky, United States, the station is currently owned by Elizabethtown CBC, Inc.

In 2022, the station switched from an Adult Contemporary format to its current country format, and also changed its callsign to WKMO-FM, after the previous WKMO was sold to EMF and was changed to be a K-Love affiliate station.
