= WBGN (FM) =

Radio station in Munfordville, Kentucky

- Munfordville, Kentucky; United States
- Broadcast area: Bowling Green, Kentucky
- Frequency: 102.3 MHz
- Branding: 102.3 Jack FM

Programming
- Format: Adult hits
- Affiliations: Jack FM network

Ownership
- Owner: Commonwealth Broadcasting; (Newberry Broadcasting, Inc.)
- Sister stations: W239BT, WCDS, WCLU, WHHT, WKLX, WLYE-FM, WWZG

History
- First air date: August 1, 1964 (as WLOC-FM)
- Former call signs: WLOC-FM (1964–1996); WMCC (1996–1998); WCLU-FM (1998–2021); WBVA (2021–2022); WLLI (2022–2025)
- Call sign meaning: "Willie" (previous format)

Technical information
- Licensing authority: FCC
- Facility ID: 61047
- Class: A
- ERP: 2,800 watts
- HAAT: 125 meters
- Transmitter coordinates: 37°10′41″N 85°55′15″W
- Translator: 98.5 W253BN (Glasgow)

Links
- Public license information: Public file; LMS

WBGN (102.3 MHz) is an FM radio station licensed to Munfordville, Kentucky, United States, and serving the Bowling Green area. The station is currently owned by Commonwealth Broadcasting and airs an adult hits radio format.

== History ==
The station first signed on the air as WLOC-FM on August 1, 1964. The station initially simulcast programming from its then-AM sister station WLOC (1150 kHz). On April 2, 1979, it began broadcasting a Variety format, featuring a mix of country and adult contemporary music. The station became solely a Hot AC-formatted station when the callsign became WMCC on January 30, 1996. It was acquired by Jacor in 1997. The station changed its call sign to WCLU-FM in May 1998, two months after being acquired by Royse Radio, Inc., to match that of Glasgow-based then-sister station WCLU. The adult contemporary format remained with the station under a new branding as "Lite 102.3".

On April 1, 2021, WCLU-FM rebranded as "Beaver 102.3/98.5" and changed its call sign to WBVA, using similar imaging to the then-Forever Communications-owner WBVR-FM (96.7 MHz) in Bowling Green.

On February 1, 2022, the station changed its call sign to WLLI. On February 4, 2022, WLLI changed its format from country to a simulcast of classic country-formatted WLYE-FM (94.1 MHz) in Glasgow, branded as "Willie Country".

In August 2024, Seven Mountains Media announced that they has closed a $450,000 deal to buy this station and WCLU in Glasgow from Royse Radio. However, two months later in October, Seven Mountains announced that they and Commonwealth Broadcasting agreed to swap stations; included in this swap were WLLI, WLYE-FM, and WCLU.

On November 18, 2024, WLLI dropped its simulcast with WLYE and began stunting with Christmas music, branded as "Santa 102.3/95.7".

On December 26, 2024, WLLI ended stunting and launched an adult hits format, branded as "102.3 Jack FM". The station changed its call letters to WBGN on December 6, 2025; those call letters were reassigned to the station after the previous owner of the callsign reverted to its previous one.
