= Street piano =

Piano placed in a public area

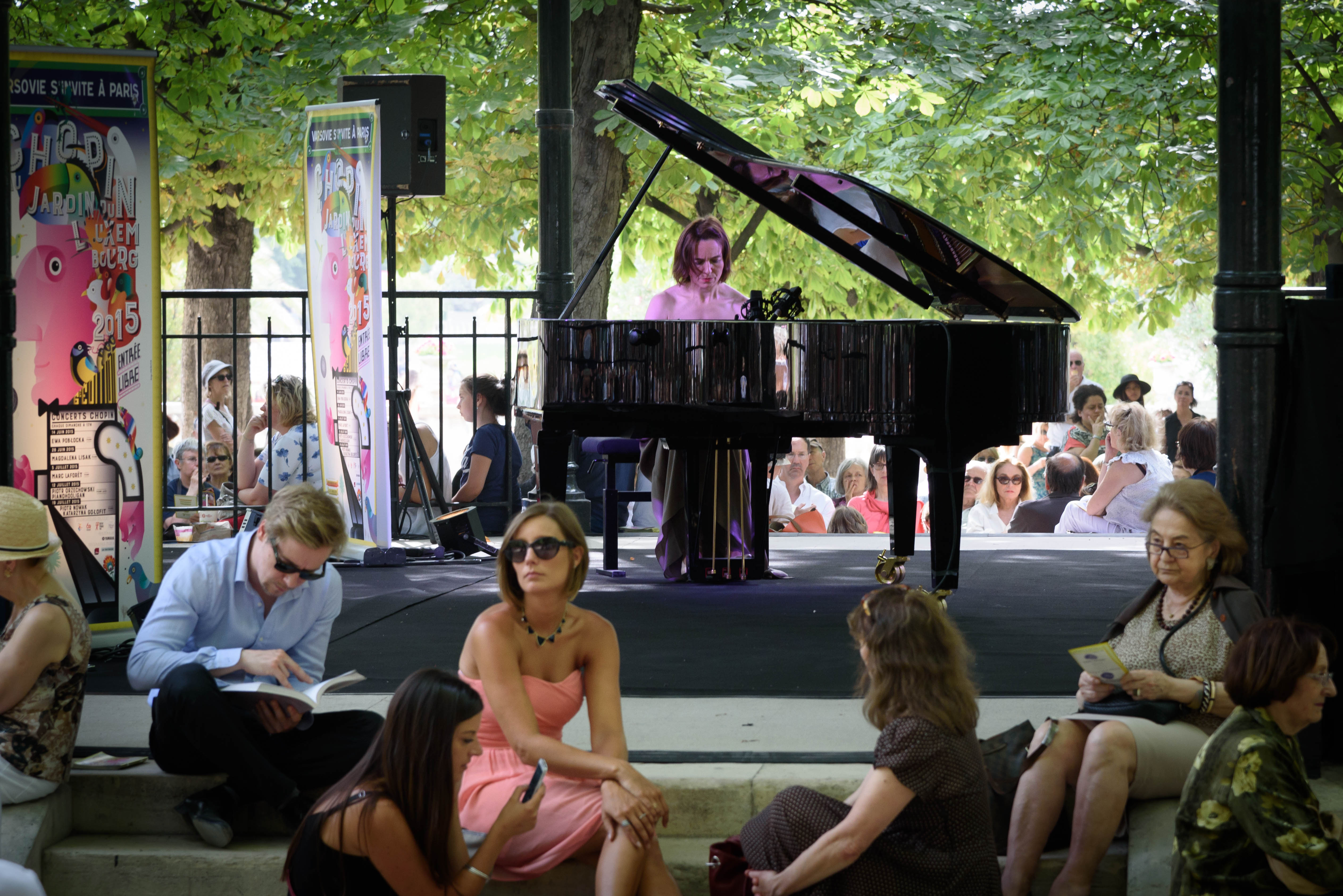
A street piano in the Luxembourg Garden, Paris.

A street piano is a piano placed in a public area that encourages passersby to stop and play.

== Notable street piano projects ==
=== The Street Piano in Sheffield ===
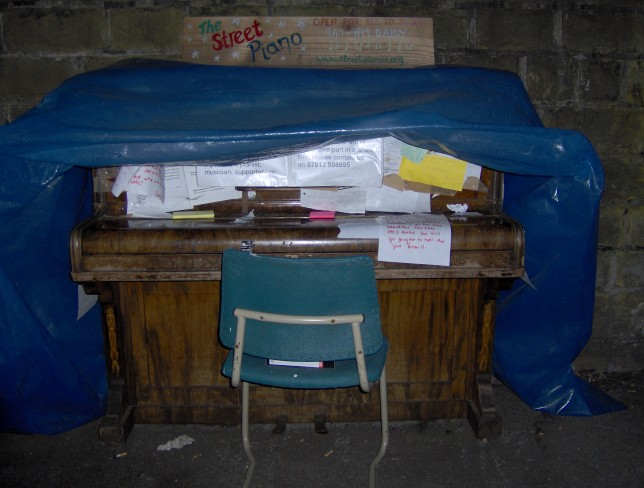
The Sheffield Street Piano

In Sheffield, The Street Piano was a piano on the pavement on Sharrow Vale Road in 2003. It was originally left outside temporarily because the owner could not get it up the steps into his new house. As a social experiment the owner and a friend then attached a sign inviting passersby to play the piano for free. This offer was taken up by a great many people and the piano became a part of the local community. It survived for over a year, including being stolen and subsequently replaced by a newer model (with several volunteers willing to provide a new one).

The piano became the centre of a local campaign once the council decided it constituted an abandoned item, and the campaign to save it spread quickly to local news outlets, with several articles on Indymedia. As of July 2006 a spokesman said in an interview for the National BBC Radio 4 that the piano was no longer under threat of removal. However, it was eventually removed in 2008 because of weather damage.

=== Play Me, I'm Yours ===
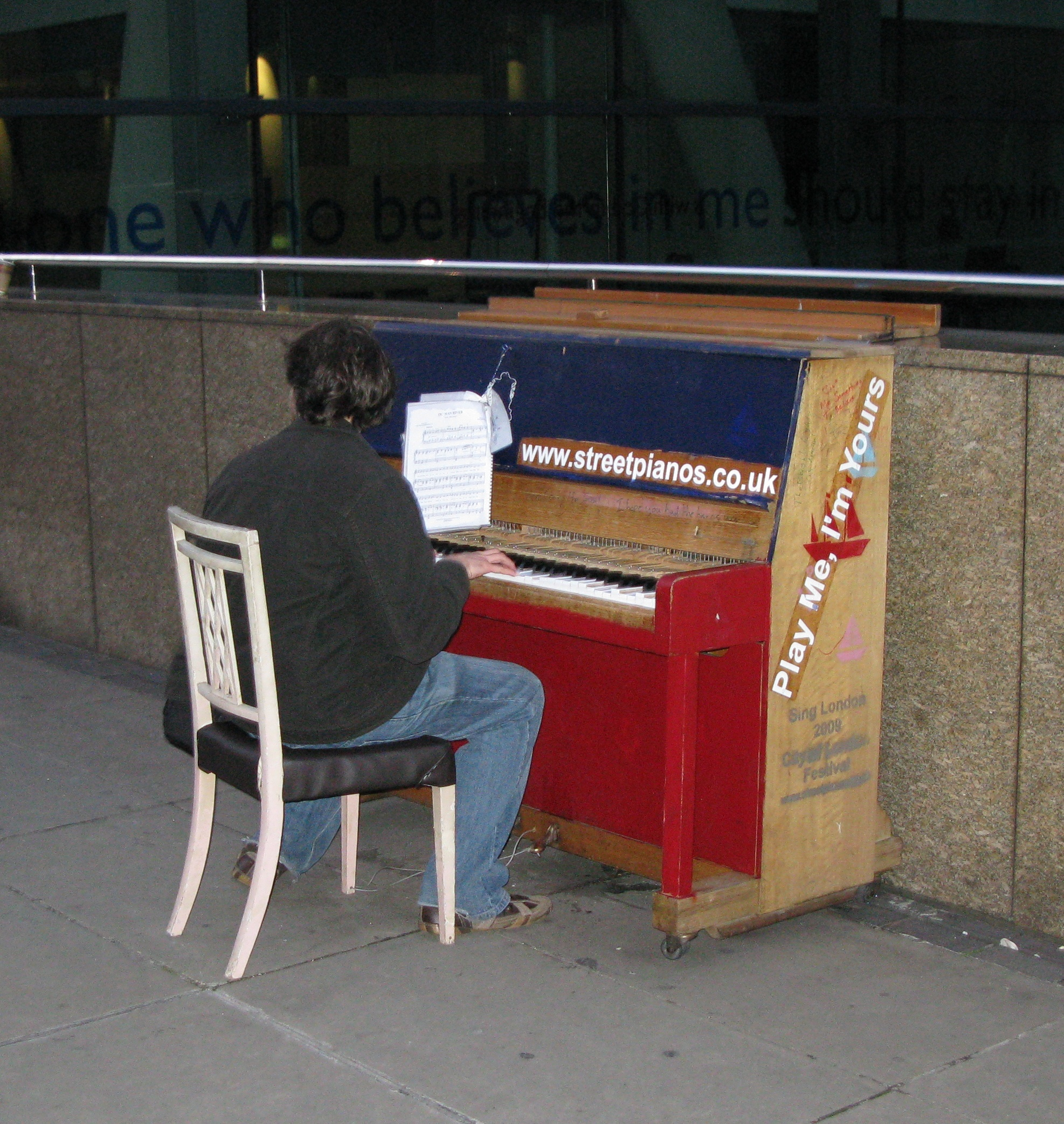
A Play Me, I'm Yours piano is being played near London's Millennium Bridge

Artist Luke Jerram created the concept in 2008 of installing multiple street pianos across a city as an art installation. Often decorated by local artist, the project is intended to challenge the prohibition of playing music in public places without special arrangement. It prompts members of the public to use the piano, regardless of skill and popularity. Typically, a musician would have been stopped from playing outside the City of London and Sing London festival.

By 2018, his team had installed over 1900 street pianos in 70 cities worldwide. Play Me I'm Yours created a global movement of pianos being installed in public places across the world by organizations and individuals for people to play. The artwork is often presented in the same format, but under a different title. In this way, the concept has now become part of culture.

==== Birmingham ====
In 2007, Jerram installed 15 street pianos throughout Birmingham, for the public to play.

Jerram said "Questioning the rules and ownership of public space 'Play Me I'm yours' is a provocation, inviting the public to engage with, activate and take ownership of their urban environment."

==== São Paulo ====
Thirteen pianos have been installed in São Paulo. Luke Jerram reported that many of those who stopped at the pianos had never played a real piano or even seen one.

==== Calgary ====
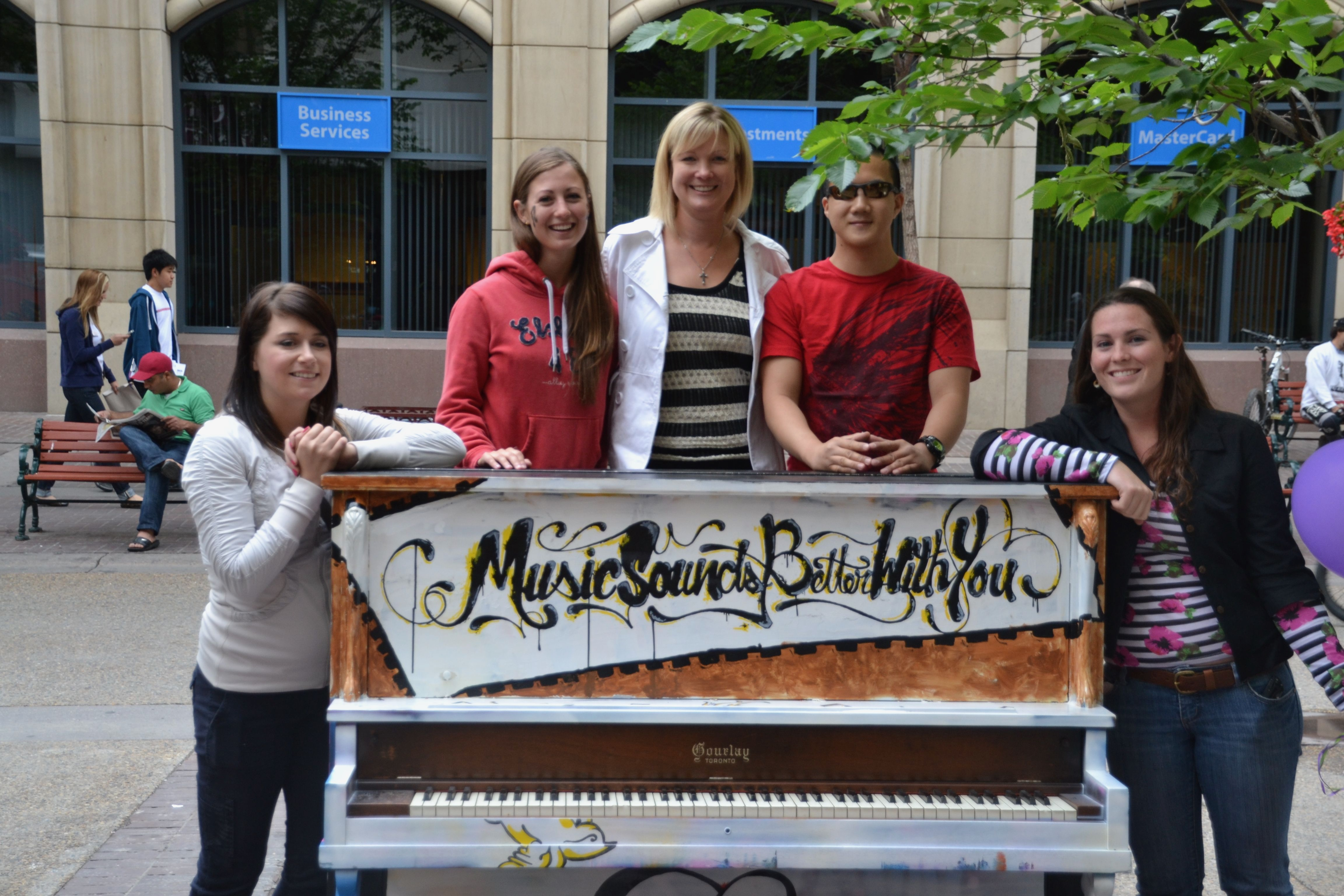
Calgary Street Piano 2012

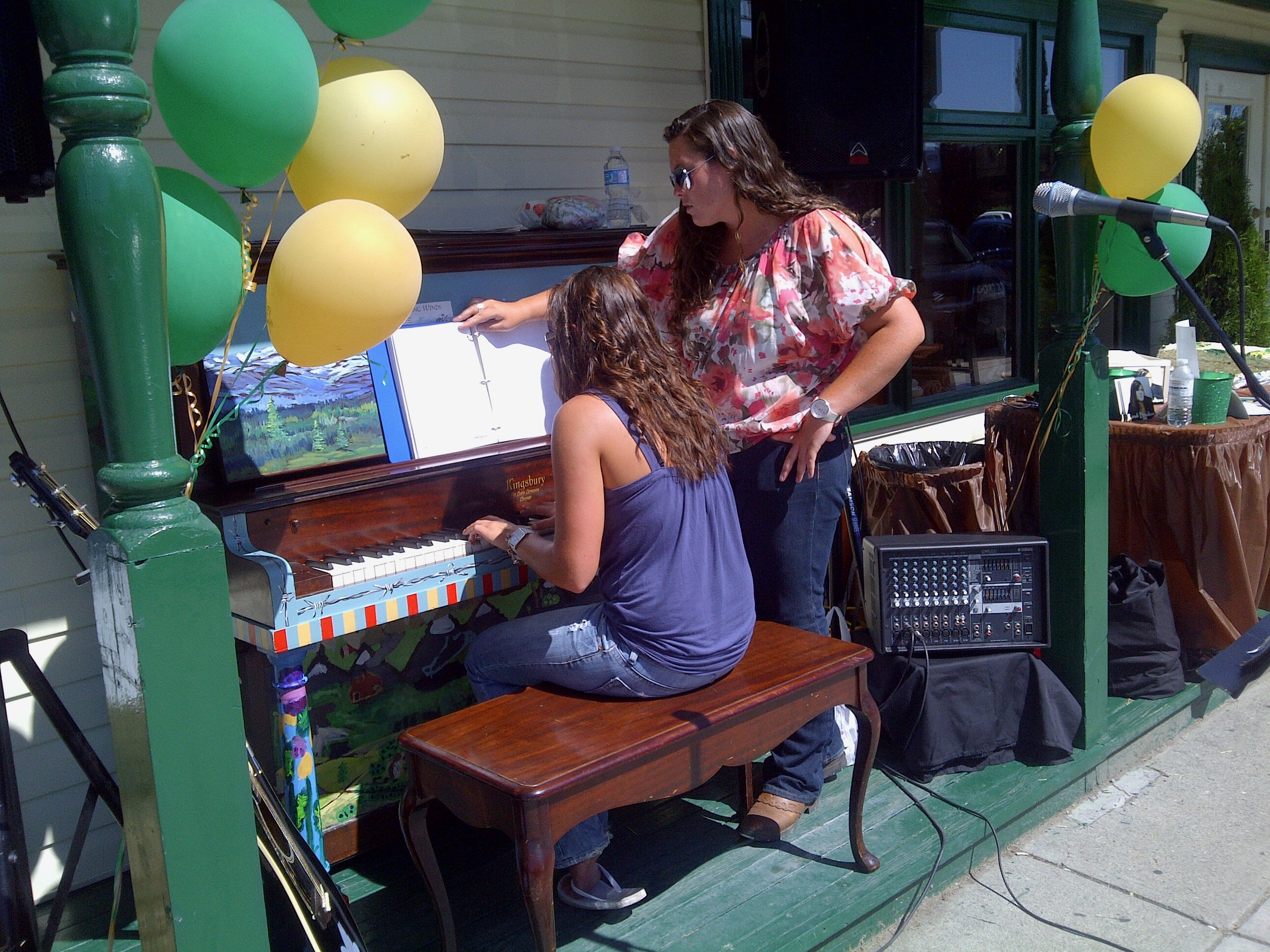
Cochrane Street Piano 2011

In Alberta, the public piano initiative was launched in 2011 in Cochrane by Dr. Nikki Filipuzzi, Professor at Mount Royal University (MRU), and her Criminal Justice students. The project aimed to explore unconventional methods of crime prevention by fostering community engagement and creating positive social interactions through music. Following its success in Cochrane, Dr. Filipuzzi and her students installed a public piano in 2012 on Stephen Avenue in downtown Calgary in 2012 - Keyboard Hits the Right Note. The downtown association has had great success over the years with many famous artists playing the piano during the Calgary Stampede. In 2013, her students installed a third piano, "Play Me, I'm Yours" in Calgary's Kensington neighbourhood, and the initiative has continued to enjoy great success over a decade later.

==== Toronto ====
"Play Me, I'm Yours" started in Toronto in the summer of 2012. 41 pianos were placed around the downtown core of Toronto in celebration of the 2015 Pan American Games which were held in the city of Toronto.

==== Sydney ====
Thirty street pianos were set up across Sydney for the Sydney Festival 2009. A website was set up for the public to upload and share their films, photographs and stories of the pianos being played.

==== London ====
In June and July 2009, thirty Play Me, I'm Yours-painted pianos were installed across London for members of the public to play. The painting on each piano was chosen to suit its location. The project was produced by Sing London and City of London Festival at a cost of £14,000. A music licence had to be obtained for the location of each piano.

==== Bristol ====
The artwork was presented again with fifteen street pianos being located in and around Bristol in September 2009.

==== Barcelona ====
Play Me, I'm Yours arrived in Barcelona when twenty-three street pianos were located across the city in March 2010.

==== Warsaw ====
In several cities of Poland "pianina miejskie" are at the disposal of the population.

==== New York ====
Play Me, I'm Yours, presented in New York City, brought sixty pianos to the center of commercial Manhattan, Brooklyn, Queens, The Bronx, and Staten Island. The pianos were placed at strategic locations throughout the five boroughs. For the two-week duration of 21 June through 5 July 2010, the pianos featured formal and impromptu concerts by students, tourists, children, nannies, lawyers, doctors, merchants, and artists in an open festival of music involving all elements of New York's culturally diverse population.

==== Santa Barbara ====
Beginning in 2009, a collaboration of arts organizations have been presenting "Pianos on State Street" as an annual community art project after being inspired by Luke Jerram and other cities. The project happens in October to celebrate Arts and Humanities month, fostering the cultural vitality of the Santa Barbara arts community. Several non-profit organizations solicit donated pianos from the community and give Santa Barbara-based artists an opportunity to paint and decorate the pianos. The pianos are installed in the heart of downtown Santa Barbara where they are on display from one to three weeks. Many youth and social service organizations participate as artists or as scheduled performers throughout the duration of the program. The program has become a well-loved project by the community attracting local residents and tourists of all ages, artistic styles and socio-economic backgrounds. A permanent display of a painted piano also sits at the Santa Barbara Airport.

==== Cincinnati ====
Play Me, I'm Yours brought 35 pianos to Greater Cincinnati starting on 9 August 2010 with a kickoff event at Fountain Square, downtown. The pianos will be donated to arts centers and children in need after the project ends on 17 September. The project was brought to Cincinnati by Cincinnati Public Radio to celebrate the 50th anniversary of WGUC, the 40th anniversary of WVXU and the 60th anniversary of WMUB.

==== Grand Rapids ====
Jerram also entered Play Me I'm Yours in the 2010 Artprize competition in Grand Rapids, Michigan. It failed to make the final round, finishing in the top 25.

==== Tilburg ====
The largest "Play Me, I'm Yours" project, with 101 pianos, took place 11 September through 18 September 2011, as part of the Incubate festival in Tilburg, Netherlands.

==== Other cities since 2011 ====
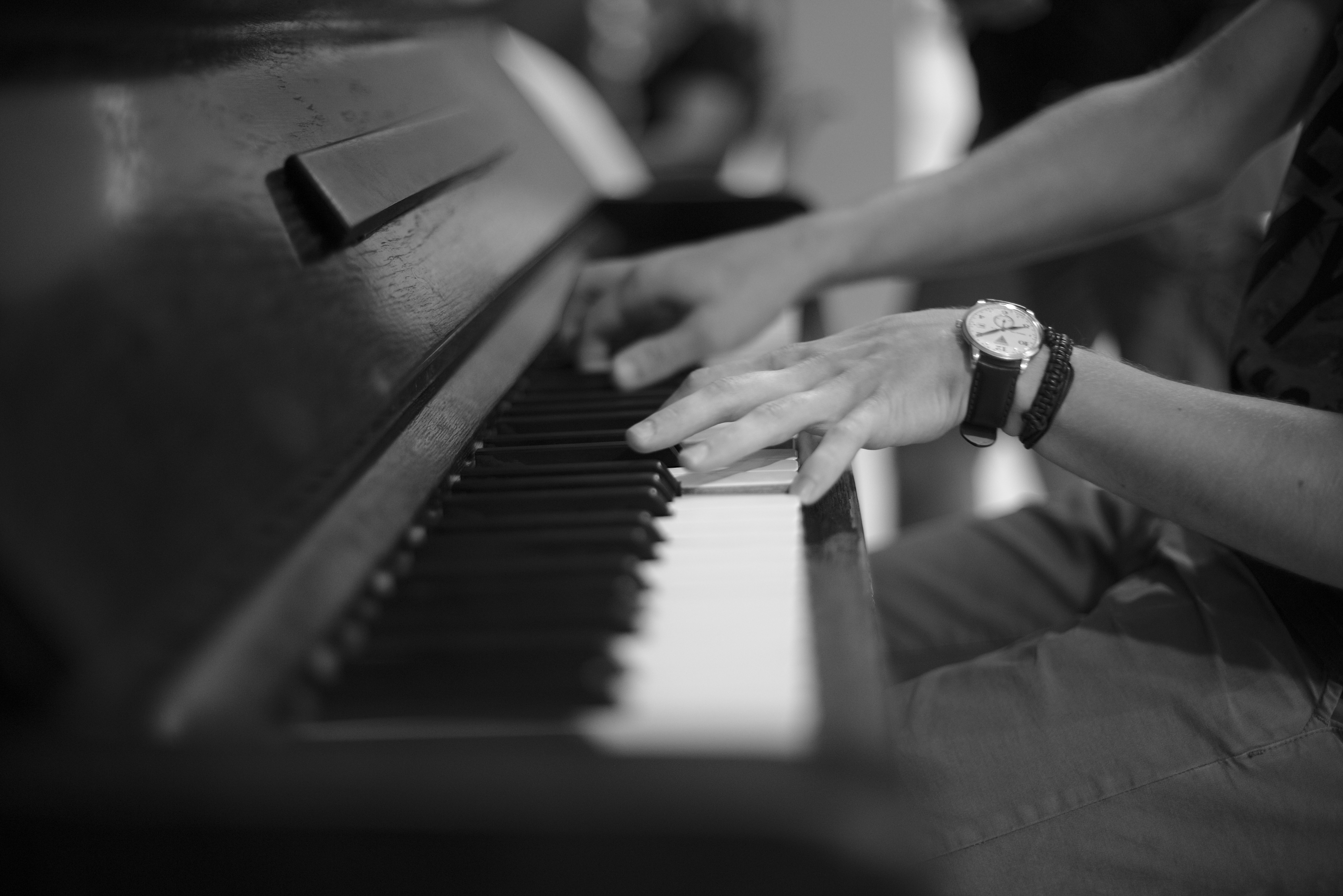
Piano player at Prague Airport

Adelaide (Australia), Augsburg (Germany), Austin (USA), Boston (USA), Cambridge (UK), Cleveland (USA), Geneva (Switzerland), Goshen (USA), Hangzhou (China), London (UK), Los Angeles (USA), Malta, Mesa (USA), Monterey (USA), Munich (Germany), Omaha (USA), Paris (France), Perth (Australia), Prague (Czech Republic), Salem (USA), Salt Lake City (USA), Stratford (Canada), Oak Bay (Canada), Toowoomba (Australia), Traverse City (USA).

=== The Public Piano Project in Joshua Tree ===
The Public Piano Project in Joshua Tree, California began as a public grand piano Valentine Gift to the community in 1995 as the Self Serve Serenade by artist Piano Bob (aka Bob Fenger). In 2002 Piano Bob began a donated piano consolidation project building a weather proof outdoor piano from the parts of 3 pianos and installed April 2004 in front of Joshua Tree Health Foods. It was enjoyed by thousands of Joshua Tree National Park Visitors and locals for nearly two years and was reinstalled 20 April 2012 at the Coyote Corner Gift Shop in Joshua Tree as the first Public Prepared Piano. The piano is reminiscent of a Gamelan Orchestra prepared with everyday items such as coins, screws, paper mutes, wedged into the strings in a typical John Cage manner (inventor of the prepared piano in the 1940s also see Bob Fenger's Acoustisizer at Prepared piano 2.10). The Public Prepared Piano is the third phase of the Public Piano Project dedication to unknown closet pianists, art in public places, and instant drum circle fun around a keyboard. Through regular tuning and maintenance of the public pianos another opportunity presented itself for the public to observe, learn and interact with the total Public Piano Project experience. Questions like:how long does it stay in tune outside? The short answer: the colder the better the more in tune. The fact that Joshua Tree is in the High Desert above Palm Springs with many 100 degree plus days in the summer gave numerous opportunities for tuning, sharing and exchanging ideas. The artist's stated intention: 'The Public Piano Project creates momentary beauty thoughts and ideas that resonate out across fields, parking lots and sidewalks. It invites others to play along and gives way to song and laughter, accidental bonding and new friends; even possibly an ephemeral center of insight and change'. On 21 December 2012 Piano Bob launched his fourth phase of the Public Piano Project with the Prepared and Unprepared dueling pianos for peace at the Joshua Tree Hospice. Public Piano Locations Public Piano Tour Pictures 2007.

=== Pianos About Town, Fort Collins ===
Inspired by Luke Jerram's Play Me, I'm Yours, Pianos About Town started in 2010 as a collaboration between Bohemian Foundation, the Downtown Development Authority, and the City of Fort Collins Art in Public Places Program. Paid artists paint murals on donated pianos in public so the community can watch the painting process. The painted pianos are then rotated between 20 locations around Fort Collins for the public to play. The program has painted 145 pianos as of 2021. The project has become a model for similar projects across the country.

=== Piano des villes, piano des champs in Montreal ===
In 2012, the Plateau-Mont-Royal borough in Montreal installed two public pianos; Patrick Watson inaugurated the season by being the first to play on one of them while artist and compositor Victor Simon played on the second. In 2013, following the success of the first season, the borough installed two more pianos and lent one to the Pointe-à-Callière Museum for a total of five public pianos, inaugurated by five different artists, Socalled, Yann Perreau, Louise-Andrée Baril, Alex Nevsky, Fanny Bloom and François Bourassa. In 2013, the idea has expanded to Mercier-Hochelaga-Maisonneuve borough, that installed one public piano. All those pianos will be left available to the public until the end of September. By 2016, the project has expanded to dozens of pianos in multiple districts.

=== Flower Piano, San Francisco ===
Starting in July 2015, the botanical garden in Golden Gate Park in San Francisco hosted a dozen pianos temporarily installed in the park for a dozen days. The project was repeated in 2016. The botanical garden is free for San Francisco residents. Other times of the year, the Sunset Piano project installs public pianos around the San Francisco Bay Area and beyond.

=== PianosInTheParks, Seattle ===
This program places artistically decorated pianos in parks and open spaces in Seattle, Bellevue and King County during the Summer.

=== Italy Airport and Train Piano Project ===
Public pianos can also be found at specific airports and train stations in Italy, such as in Rome, Venice, Florence, and Milan.

=== PIANO SEOUL ===
Since November 2023, Seoul has begun to officially run several public pianos. Public pianos in Noksapyeong Station, Banpo Hangrang Park, Nodeul Island are mostly loved.

== See also ==
- Imagine Piano Peace Project
- London Bridge station organ
