= WNKN =

Radio station in Middletown, Ohio

- Middletown, Ohio; United States
- Broadcast area: Cincinnati metropolitan area; Dayton metropolitan area
- Frequency: 105.9 MHz (HD Radio)

Programming
- Format: Catholic radio
- Subchannels: HD2: Church music
- Affiliations: Relevant Radio

Ownership
- Owner: Relevant Radio; (Relevant Radio, Inc.)

History
- First air date: July 1, 1959
- Former call signs: WPFB-FM (1959–1985, 1988–2011); WPBF (1985–1988)
- Call sign meaning: Station formerly owned by Northern Kentucky University

Technical information
- Licensing authority: FCC
- Facility ID: 54833
- Class: B
- ERP: 34,000 watts
- HAAT: 181 meters (594 ft)
- Transmitter coordinates: 39°30′57″N 84°21′5″W

Links
- Public license information: Public file; LMS
- Webcast: Listen live
- Website: relevantradio.com

WNKN (105.9 FM) is a commercial radio station licensed to Middletown, Ohio, and serving parts of the Cincinnati and Dayton metropolitan areas. It broadcasts a Catholic radio format and is owned by Relevant Radio.

WNKN has an effective radiated power (ERP) of 34,000 watts. The transmitter is on Rosendale Road near Breiel Boulevard in Middletown. WNKN's tower is shared with former sister station WPFB.

== History ==
=== WPFB-FM and WPBF ===
The station first signed on the air on July 1, 1959. Its call sign was WPFB-FM. At first, WPFB-FM simulcast its AM sister station, WPFB (910 AM). WPFB-FM was the first FM station in Ohio and the 13th in the United States to broadcast in FM stereo. It had several format changes over the years, playing soul, R&B and urban gospel in the late 1970s.

In the early 1980s, the station switched to disco music, as "Disco 106 FM" after changing the call letters to WPBF. That only lasted a few years. Alan Matthews was hired as program director and flipped the format to soft adult contemporary as "Mellow 106 FM". In 1984 the station gave up the adult contemporary format to go Top 40 as "Rock 106". That led to the confusion with Rock 40 outlet WSKS 96 Rock. While keeping the CHR format, WPBF added the word "New" as "New Rock 106". But then, a few months later WGTZ Z-93 debuted commercial free with a much stronger signal into Dayton. Then in 1986, WPBF changed to a southern gospel format and added bluegrass music to the mix. The call sign switched back to WPFB-FM from 1986 to 1988, blending bluegrass and classic country as "The New 105.9, Dayton's Country Rebel!" It maintained a country music format from 1988 until 2011 when the station was sold to Northern Kentucky University (NKU).

=== Switch to Public Radio ===
Beginning on February 1, 2011; WPFB-FM, along with its then-sister station WPAY-FM in Portsmouth, Ohio, began simulcasting the signal of NKU-owned WNKU. WPFB-FM and WPAY switched from a commercial country format to a non-commercial, listener-supported adult album alternative (AAA) sound.

The sale was approved by the Federal Communications Commission (FCC) on June 20, 2011. The station officially changed its call letters to WNKN on that date. In June 2016, former sister station WPFB AM became a simulcast of Catholic religious stations WNOP and WHSS.

=== 2017 sale ===
In April 2016, citing state budget cuts to education, Northern Kentucky University announced that it would "explore the possibility of a sale of WNKU-FM and its assets." On February 14, 2017, NKU's board of trustees voted to approve the sale of WNKU's license and transmitter site to the Bible Broadcasting Network for $1.9 million. In addition, the WNKE repeater was sold to the Educational Media Foundation (EMF) for $750,000 plus 75% of the net sale proceeds of EMF-owned affiliate WEKV in South Webster, Ohio. At the time of this announcement, no decision had been made on the future of the WNKN repeater. The stations continued to be operated by NKU as WNKU until the sales were approved by the Federal Communications Commission.

On July 19, 2017, NKU's board of trustees approved the sale of the WNKN repeater to Grant County Broadcasters, Inc., owners of classic country WNKR, which is licensed to Williamstown, Kentucky, and has studio space in nearby Dry Ridge, for $5.3 million. The price included $4 million in cash and $1.3 in advertising airtime for the University. The sale included all assets of WNKN, as well as the equipment and supplies of WNKU. Upon FCC approval of the purchase, Grant County Broadcasters stated they intended to revert the station back to a locally owned, for-profit, commercial model with a then yet to be determined on-air format.

On July 28, 2017, WNKU announced on their Facebook page that the sale of WNKN was expected to be approved by the FCC by the end of October 2017 and that it, along with the wnku.com online stream, would continue to broadcast as WNKU until final FCC approval of the WNKN sale was granted. With the August 3, 2017 format flip of WNKE to the EMF-owned K-Love format (now WPYK) along with the August 25, 2017 conversion of WNKU (now WYHH) to Bible Broadcasting Network programming, WNKN became the final remaining on-air station identifying under the WNKU banner.

The sale of WNKN finalized on September 28, 2017, with WNKU programming ending on both WNKN and the WNKU online stream at 6:00 p.m. The final AAA format song was "This Must Be The Place" by Talking Heads. As stated in the original purchase agreement, in addition to the WNKN license and transmitter site in Middletown, Grant County Broadcasters had purchased all of WNKU's studio equipment. The farmhouse adjacent to the transmitter site, which was WPBF-FM and WPBF (AM)'s studios prior to their sale to NKU, was not purchased by Grant County Broadcasters and remains the property of NKU.

=== Classic country and classic hits ===
On October 2, 2017, WNKN signed back on the air as a sister station of WNKR, returning to the classic country format that was played on the station prior to its purchase by NKU in 2011. While the stations shared playlists and talent, they were not a simulcast. Each station aired content appropriate to the local market they serve.

On July 12, 2022, WNKN split from its simulcast with WNKR and changed its format from classic country to classic hits. The station rebranded as "105.9 The Oasis".

=== Relevant Radio sale ===
On August 24, 2023, Grand Country Broadcasters announced that it would sell WNKN to Catholic broadcaster Relevant Radio for $4.5 million. Grant would continue to own WNKR after the sale was complete; ahead of the sale closure, it would assume WNKN's format on September 4, and the two stations would simulcast as a means of transition. The sale closed on October 26 and WNKN switched to its new owner's network upon that date.

== See also ==
- WPFB (AM)
