= WPAY =

WPAY may refer to:

- WPAY (AM), a radio station (1520 AM) licensed to serve Rossford, Ohio, United States
- WKSG (FM), a radio station (98.3 FM) licensed to serve Garrison, Kentucky, which held the call sign WPAY-FM from 2018 to 2021
- WPYK, a radio station (104.1 FM) licensed to serve Portsmouth, Ohio, which held the call sign WPAY-FM from 1966 to 2011 and from 2017 to 2018
- WPAY (Portsmouth, Ohio), a defunct radio station (1400 AM) formerly licensed to serve Portsmouth, Ohio
