= Wiro =

Wiro may refer to:

- WKSG (FM), a radio station (98.3 FM) licensed to serve Garrison, Kentucky, United States, which held the call sign WIRO in 2022
- WITO, a radio station (1230 AM) licensed to serve Ironton, Ohio, United States, which held the call sign WIRO from 1951 to 2022
- Wiro of Roermond (d. c. 700), Christian saint
- Wirö language, spoken in Colombia and Venezuela
- Wyoming Infrared Observatory, an astronomical observatory located in Wyoming, US.
