= WIRO =

WIRO may refer to:

- Wyoming Infrared Observatory
- WIRO (FM), a radio station (106.7 FM) licensed to serve Ironton, Ohio, United States
- WKSG (FM), a radio station (98.3 FM) licensed to serve Garrison, Kentucky, United States, which held the call sign WIRO in 2022
- WITO, a radio station (1230 AM) licensed to serve Ironton, Ohio, which held the call sign WIRO from 1951 to 2022
- Wirö language, an Indigenous language of Venezuela and eastern Colombia
