= Oscar Treadwell =

American journalist and radio host (1926-2006)

- Born: Arthur Pedersen; May 11, 1926; Chicago, Illinois
- Died: April 1, 2006 (aged 79)
- Presenting career
- Stations: WZIP, WNOP-AM, WGUC-FM, WVXU-FM
- Style: Disc Jockey

Oscar Treadwell (born Arthur Pedersen) (May 11, 1926 - April 1, 2006) was an American jazz radio journalist and presenter. Known as "OT", he became known mainly by a dedication to him by Charlie Parker, a composition called "An Oscar for Treadwell". Treadwell's first jobs were as an industrial manager and consultant. However, he was better known due to his career as a DJ, jazz historian and radio host, which began in 1947 and lasted over 50 years.

== Jazz career ==
Treadwell began his career at radio stations in New Jersey and Pennsylvania before moving to Cincinnati, Ohio in 1960. There he began in 1962 with his jazz on radio station WZIP and then from 1965 to 1973 at WNOP (AM).

Treadwell moved to WGUC and moderated the jazz program under his initials OT from 1973 to 1995, then moved "Jazz with OT" to Xavier University's WVXU. Until his retirement in 2001, he oversaw the jazz program and the station WMKV. In 2005 Treadwell returned to WVXU, where he worked until his death in April 2006. Repeats of his many programs continue to be broadcast Sunday evenings on WVXU.

== Tributes ==
Oscar Treadwell, who was called by his fans, "OT", was an important member of the jazz scene of Cincinnati. Through his radio programs, he was known by many, and friends with many jazz musicians, including Dave Brubeck, Charlie Parker, Dizzy Gillespie and Thelonious Monk. His friends honored him with the compositions:

- "An Oscar for Treadwell" (1949) by Charlie Parker
- "Treadin 'with Treadwell" (1950) by Wardell Gray.
- "Oska T" (1955) by Thelonious Monk

After his death, the Public Library of Cincinnati released a CD entitled "O.T. - A Celebration of Oscar Treadwell". The library had been given recordings of many of Treadwell's shows on cassettes and CDs. The entire collection is available on CD at the library; the CD index has been digitized and can be viewed on the library's website.
