= WPFB =

Simulcast of WNOP, Newport, Kentucky

Middletown, Ohio; United States
- Broadcast area: Dayton metro area
- Frequency: 910 kHz
- Branding: Sacred Heart Radio

Programming
- Language: English
- Format: Catholic talk/services
- Network: EWTN Global Catholic Radio Network

Ownership
- Owner: Sacred Heart Radio Inc.; (Sacred Heart Radio Inc.)

History
- First air date: 1947; 78 years ago
- Call sign meaning: former owner Paul F. Braden

Technical information
- Licensing authority: FCC
- Facility ID: 54836
- Class: D
- Power: 1,000 watts (day); 100 watts (night)
- Transmitter coordinates: 39°30′57.00″N 84°21′5.00″W

Links
- Public license information: Public file; LMS
- Webcast: Listen live
- Website: sacredheartradio.com

WPFB (910 AM) is a radio station broadcasting Catholic programming after a switch from an adult album alternative format as a simulcast of WNKU. It is licensed to Middletown, Ohio, United States, and serves the Dayton area. The station is owned by Sacred Heart Radio, Inc. and is now simulcasting WNOP 740 AM licensed in Newport, Kentucky. In April 2016, WPFB was sold to Sacred Heart Radio, a religious talk radio station based in Norwood, Ohio. On June 3, 2016 WPFB began simulcasting WNOP (AM) alongside WHSS.

== History ==
Paul F. Braden first signed on WPFB in 1947 as a daytime-only station but a few months later received permission from the Federal Communications Commission to also broadcast in the evening. Throughout much of its history, WPFB had several format switches from middle of the road, country music, adult standards to talk radio, classic country and southern gospel. It established itself as a "Real Country" format which included Bluegrass and comfortably managed to include the current top hits on the charts. This format ran from the late 1970s to the early 1990s and was nominated for several Country and Bluegrass awards nationally. Several of the DJ's were also popular recording artists.

WPFB was also a pioneer of stereo broadcasting, an experimental broadcast occurred with one stereo channel transmitted on WPFB and the other on co-owned WPFB-FM.

The station, along with WPFB-FM and WPAY-FM in Portsmouth, Ohio, was purchased in January 2011 by Northern Kentucky University (NKU), the owners of WNKU. WPFB temporarily served as a repeater station of WNKU while NKU searched for a buyer for the AM frequency to help fund the purchase of the two FM stations. In April 2016, Sacred Heart Radio, a religious talk radio station with studios located in Norwood, OH that is affiliated with EWTN Global Catholic Radio, announced that they had acquired WPFB from NKU. The purchase was consummated on May 5, 2016, at a price of $450,000. WPFB began simulcasting WNOP (AM) and WHSS on June 3, 2016. WHSS was sold by Sacred Heart Radio in 2023, making WPFB the only simulcast of WNOP.

== Previous logos ==
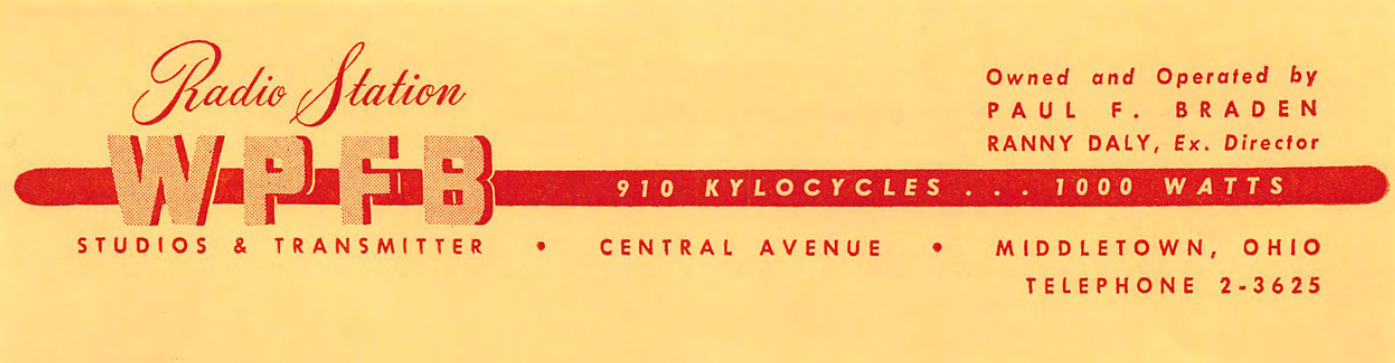
