= WJCR =

WJCR may refer to:

- WJCR-FM, a radio station (90.1 FM) licensed to Upton, Kentucky, United States
- WJCR-LP, a low-power radio station (94.7 FM) licensed to Jasper, Tennessee, United States
- WNJR (FM), a college radio station (91.7 FM) formerly known as WJCR
