= WIZD =

WIZD may refer to:

- WIZD-LP, a defunct low-power radio station (100.3 FM) formerly licensed to serve Monroeville, Alabama, United States
- WNKW, a radio station (1480 AM) licensed to serve Neon, Kentucky, United States, which held the call sign WIZD from 2011 to 2015
