= WEKV =

WEKV may refer to:

- WEKV (FM), a radio station (101.9 FM) licensed to serve Central City, Kentucky, United States
- WJKB, a radio station (105.1 FM) licensed to serve Sheffield, Pennsylvania, United States, which held the call sign WEKV from 2017 to 2020
- WGNH, a radio station (94.9 FM) licensed to serve South Webster, Ohio, United States, which held the call sign WEKV from 2006 to 2017
