= WMUB =

WMUB may refer to:

- WMUB (FM), a radio station (88.5 FM) licensed to serve Oxford, Ohio, United States
- WMUB-LD, a low-power television station (channel 31, virtual 38) licensed to serve Warner Robins, Georgia, United States
- WPTO, a low-power television station (channel 29, virtual channel 14) licensed to serve Oxford, Ohio, which held the call sign WMUB-TV from 1959 to 1977
