= Roy Moss =

American rockabilly singer (born 1929)

Roy Moss (born August 1929) is an American retired rockabilly singer.

Moss was born in Plainview, Arkansas, and was the cousin of governor Orville Chaney. Little is known of his childhood.

Moss began his career after meeting songwriter Jimmie Skinner, who got him a job at radio station WNOP. There he played regularly with the group, The Country Partners. He began playing rockabilly music right as it began cresting in the mid-1950s, and around that time Elvis Presley helped him get a slot on the show, Louisiana Hayride. Following this, Skinner managed to land Moss a contract with Mercury Records, and released a few singles in 1956 and 1958, which saw some regional success in the American South. He toured with Skinner and also worked with country musicians such as Pee Wee King, Cowboy Copas, and Ray Price. Moving to Detroit, he appeared on various television and radio programs.

Moss' 1958 single "Juanita" was later covered by Dale Hawkins. At the end of the 1950s he withdrew from music and became a farmer in Tennessee. In 1994, he made a comeback, releasing an album on Eagle Records, with the previous eight Mercury recordings and 11 new cuts. The album was recorded at Silverfalls Records in Longview, Texas. with Kelli Grant, the Queen of Swing, doing the arrangements. Musicians included Kelli Grant on piano and bass along with guitarist Johnny Patterson and Jeff Ebner on drums.

== Singles ==
| Year | Title | Record Label |
|---|---|---|
| 1956 | "You're My Big Baby Now" / "You Nearly Lose Your Mind" | Mercury Records |
| 1956 | "Corrine, Corrina" / "You Don't Know My Mind" | Mercury Records |
| 1958 | "Wiggle Walkin' Baby" / "Juanita" | Fascination Records |
| | "1143"; "Blues in My Heart"; "Got To Make Some Changes"; "Gotta Do My Time"; "Have You Ever Been Lonely"; "Johnny B. Goode"; "Little Bit"; "Mona Lisa"; "Mule Skinner Blues"; "Waiting for a Train"; "Tennessee Saturday Night" | not issued |

== Sources ==
- Roy Moss at AllMusic
