= WNOP =

WNOP may refer to:

- WNOP (AM), a radio station (740 AM) licensed to serve Newport, Kentucky, United States
- WNOP-FM, a defunct radio station (89.5 FM) formerly licensed to serve Versailles, Indiana, United States
