= WNFC =

WNFC may refer to:

- Women's National Football Conference, a women's American football league
- WNFC (FM), a radio station in Paducah, Kentucky, United States
