= WZWP =

Coordinates: 38.857°N 83.610°W

- West Union, Ohio; United States
- Frequency: 89.5 MHz
- Branding: King of Kings Radio

Programming
- Format: Christian
- Affiliations: King of Kings Radio

Ownership
- Owner: Somerset Educational Broadcasting Foundation
- Sister stations: WTHL, WNFC, WPTJ, WGNH

History
- First air date: 1990
- Former call signs: WVXM (1990–1995); WVXQ (01/17/1995); WVXW (01/17/1995-2007)

Technical information
- Licensing authority: FCC
- Facility ID: 74301
- Class: B1
- ERP: 3,000 watts
- HAAT: 174 meters (571 ft)

Links
- Public license information: Public file; LMS
- Webcast: Listen Online
- Website: WZWP website

WZWP is an American non-commercial FM radio station located in West Union, Ohio, and operates on the assigned frequency of 89.5 MHz. WZWP is one of seven stations in the King of Kings Radio network.

== Programming ==
WZWP's programming consists of Christian talk and teaching shows such as Thru the Bible with J. Vernon McGee, Love Worth Finding with Adrian Rogers, In Touch with Charles Stanley, Focus on the Family, and Unshackled!. WZWP also airs a variety of Christian music.

== History ==
The station began broadcasting in 1990, and held the call sign WVXM, airing a jazz/public radio format, and was an affiliate of NPR. The station was owned by Xavier University. In 1995, the station's call sign was changed to WVXW. The station was part of Xavier University's X-Star Radio Network.

In 2005, Xavier University sold the seven stations of the X-Star Radio Network, including WVXM, to Cincinnati Classical Public Radio for $15 million. The station would air a NPR-news and information format.

In 2007, three repeater stations (including WVXW) were sold to Christian Voice of Central Ohio in 2007 because of the small population and lack of a revenue stream from the outlying communities. That year, the station's call sign was changed to WZWP. WZWP would adopt a Christian format, airing primarily Christian talk and teaching programming, and was branded "The Promise". By 2010, the station was airing a Christian contemporary format and was branded "The River".

In 2011, Somerset Educational Broadcasting Foundation purchased WZWP for $135,000. The station would become an affiliate of its "King of Kings Radio" network.
