= WYHH =

Bible Broadcasting Network radio station in Highland Heights, Kentucky

- Highland Heights, Kentucky; United States
- Broadcast area: Cincinnati, Northern Kentucky
- Frequency: 89.7 MHz

Programming
- Format: Christian

Ownership
- Owner: Bible Broadcasting Network, Inc.

History
- Former call signs: WNKU (1983–2017)

Technical information
- Licensing authority: FCC
- Facility ID: 4280
- Class: C3
- ERP: 12,000 watts horiz 9,900 watts vert
- HAAT: 97 meters
- Transmitter coordinates: 39°02′21″N 84°27′57″W

Links
- Public license information: Public file; LMS
- Webcast: Listen Live
- Website: http://www.bbnradio.org

WYHH (89.7 FM) is a radio station broadcasting a Christian radio format. Licensed in Highland Heights, Kentucky, United States, it serves the Northern Kentucky and Greater Cincinnati area. The station is owned by Bible Broadcasting Network, Inc.

== Additional frequencies ==
WYHH signed on as WNKU in 1985 on 89.7 FM. As one of the last available frequencies in the Cincinnati area, WNKU was limited by a 12,000 watt directional signal. In 2011, then-station owner Northern Kentucky University (NKU) purchased WPFB & WPFB-FM in Middletown, Ohio and 104.1 WPAY-FM in Portsmouth, Ohio, and increased the potential reach of WNKU to 3.1 million listeners. WNKU began simulcasting its adult album alternative (AAA) format on WPFB (now called WNKN) and WPAY (known as WNKE during NKU ownership and now known as WPYK) on February 1, 2011. In April 2016, Sacred Heart Radio, a religious talk radio station with studios located in Norwood, OH affiliated with EWTN Global Catholic Radio, announced that they had acquired WPFB's AM frequency from NKU. The purchase was consummated on May 5, 2016, at a price of $450,000. WPFB began simulcasting WNOP (AM) and WHSS on June 3, 2016.

== 2015 format changes ==
In February 2015, WNKU announced a new general manager, 25-year radio veteran Sean O'Mealy. In April 2015, longtime WNKU Music Director John McGue was promoted to program director and WAPS Music Director Liz Felix was named Assistant Program Director. The new programming team made changes to WNKU's format, increasing the focus on new alternative music and decreasing the heavy reliance on folk and roots music. The changes were in response to evidence that, despite the signal expansion of 2011, station revenue was not keeping pace with growing expenses.

While WNKU had always supported music from the Northern Kentucky and Greater Cincinnati area, the format changes included an increased focus on local music. In October 2015, WNKU announced a new initiative to play at least one song by a local artist every hour.

WNKU also began featuring music from the Cincinnati-based label King Records, mixing in classic soul music during regular programming hours.

== 2017 sale ==
In April 2016, citing state budget cuts to education, Northern Kentucky University announced that it would "explore the possibility of a sale of WNKU-FM and its assets." On February 14, 2017, NKU's board of trustees voted to approve the sale of WNKU's license and transmitter site to the Bible Broadcasting Network for $1.9 million. The sale did not include the WNKU call letters, studio and equipment or personnel. In a separate transaction, the WNKE repeater was sold to the Educational Media Foundation (owners of the K-Love and Air1 networks) for $750,000 plus 75% of the net sale proceeds of EMF-owned WEKV in South Webster, Ohio (ultimately receiving $97,500 of the proceeds of the sale of WEKV to Somerset Educational Broadcasting Foundation of Somerset, Kentucky). The stations continued to be operated by NKU as WNKU until the sales were approved by the Federal Communications Commission (FCC).

On May 3, 2017, Louisville Public Media offered the university $5 million, with $3.5 million in cash and $1.5 million in services aimed at maintaining the academic mission of WNKU through on-campus music events, student learning opportunities and broadcasting internships. The deal included ten years of on-air promotion for the university in Cincinnati, Dayton and Louisville and would have purchased the 105.9 WNKN frequency. Despite the offer to maintain the Triple A format of the radio station, The board of regents ultimately passed on the offer.

On July 19, 2017, NKU's board of trustees approved the sale of the WNKN repeater to Grant County Broadcasters, Inc., owners of classic country station WNKR, which is licensed to Williamstown, Kentucky and has its studios in Dry Ridge, Kentucky, for $5.3 million. Upon FCC approval of the purchase, Grant County Broadcasters stated that they intended to revert the station to a locally owned, for-profit, commercial model with a then-yet to be determined on-air format.

On July 28, 2017, WNKU announced on their Facebook page that the sales of WNKU and WNKE frequencies had been approved by the FCC. It was also announced that the last day of WNKU broadcasting on the 89.7 FM frequency would be on Friday, August 18, 2017. WNKU also stated that the sale of WNKN was expected to be approved by the FCC by the end of October 2017 and that it, along with the wnku.com online stream, would continue to broadcast as WNKU until final FCC approval of the WNKN sale was granted.

The sale of WNKU 89.7 FM to Bible Broadcasting Network was consummated on August 18, 2017, at which time the station changed its call sign to WYHH and temporarily went off the air. Bible Broadcasting Network began broadcasting on WYHH on August 25, 2017.

The sale of WNKN to Grant County Broadcasters was finalized on September 28, 2017, with the final WNKU branded over the air and online broadcast permanently signing off at 6:00 PM EDT. The final song for WNKN/WNKU under Northern Kentucky University ownership was “This Must Be The Place” by Talking Heads. It was announced at the same time that, in addition to the WNKN license and transmitter site in Middletown, Grant County Broadcasters had purchased all of WNKU's studio equipment, effectively preventing WNKU from returning as either an on-campus over-the-air or internet-only broadcast station.

== Former weekend and specialty programs ==
In 2015, WNKU changed its programming schedule, dropping several nationally syndicated programs (including "eTown," "UnderCurrents," and Little Steven's "Underground Garage") in favor of content produced in house. Former WOXY DJ Matt Sledge was added to the weekend lineup.

From 2016 until its shutdown, weekend programs on WNKU included Americana music on "The Front Porch," hosted by Pam Temple, "Roadhouse Blues" with Ken Hanes, classic rock and "deep cuts" with Mary Peale, soul and R&B with "Mr. Rhythm Man," family music from "Spare the Rock, Spoil the Child," and bluegrass music with Katie Laur and Oakley Scot on "Music From the Hills of Home."

On January 22, 2016, WNKU introduced a new program focused on funk music, hosted by Cincinnati musician Freekbass.

== Previous logo ==
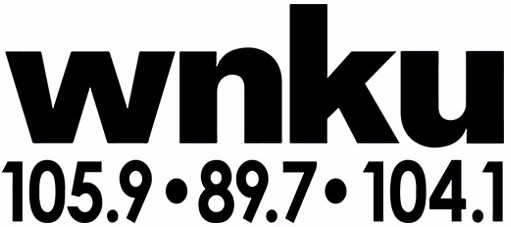
