= WNFC (FM) =

Coordinates: 37°03′41″N 88°50′26″W

- Paducah, Kentucky; United States
- Frequency: 91.7 MHz
- Branding: King of Kings Radio

Programming
- Format: Religious
- Network: King of Kings Radio

Ownership
- Owner: Somerset Educational Broadcasting Foundation
- Sister stations: WTHL, WPTJ, WGNH, WZWP

Technical information
- Licensing authority: FCC
- Facility ID: 175623
- Class: C3
- ERP: 15,000 watts
- HAAT: 90.4 meters (297 ft)

Links
- Public license information: Public file; LMS
- Webcast: Listen live
- Website: kingofkingsradio.com

WNFC is a radio station airing a Religious format licensed to Paducah, Kentucky, broadcasting on 91.7 FM. The station is owned by Somerset Educational Broadcasting Foundation.

== History ==
The station previously served as a full-time simulcast of former sister station WJCR-FM of Upton, Kentucky. The station now serves as part of the King of Kings Radio Network of Somerset, Kentucky.
