= Williams Hall (Miami University) =

Hall in Ohio, US

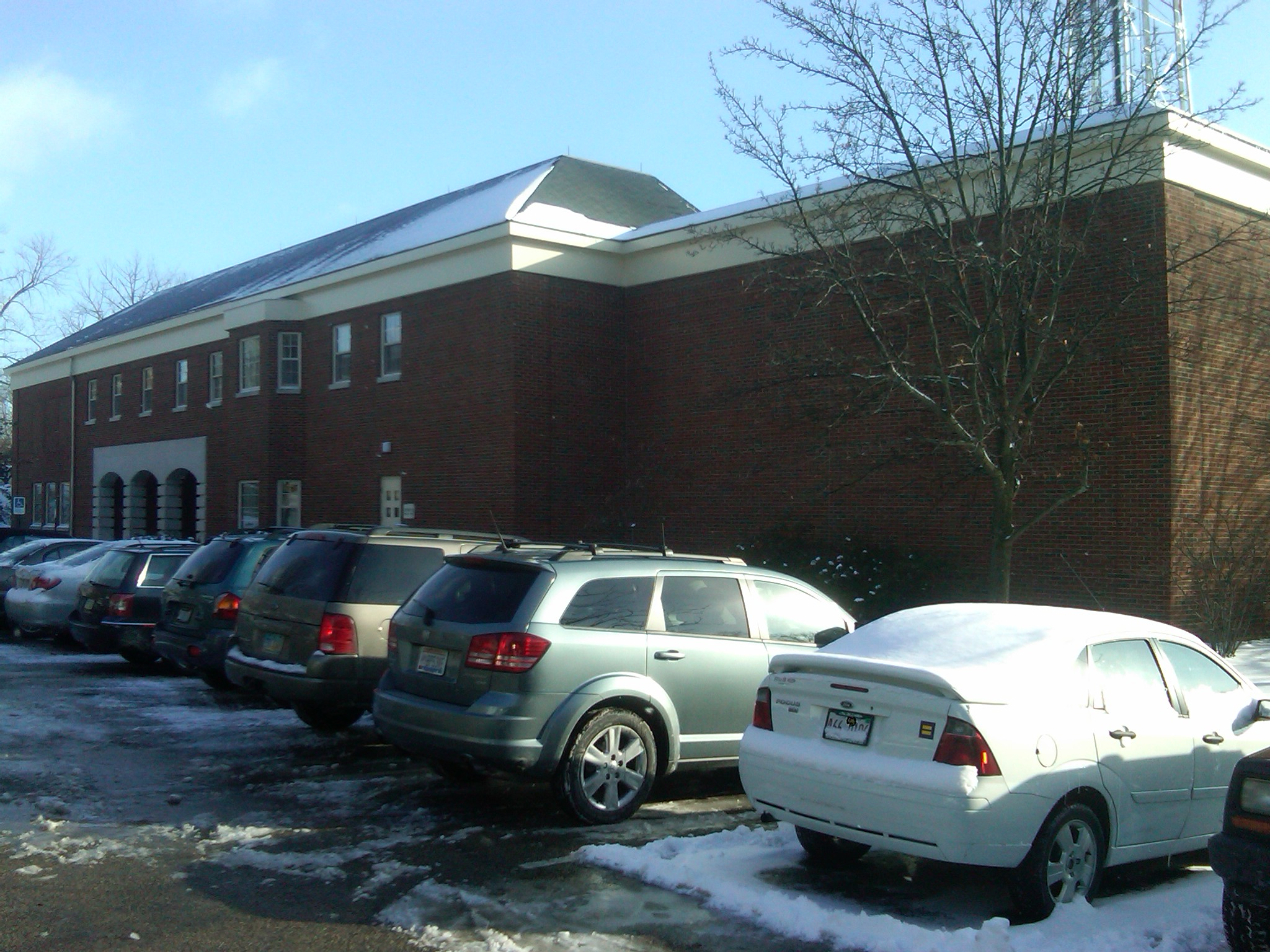
- Exterior of Williams Hall, December 2010

General information
- Type: Brick
- Architectural style: Georgian
- Location: Oxford, Ohio, US
- Coordinates: 39°30′23.4″N 84°44′11.9″W
- Completed: 1959
- Demolished: 2026

Technical details
- Floor count: 2

Williams Hall was an academic building on the campus of Miami University in Oxford, Ohio, United States. It housed the university's journalism and communications departments, as well as WMUB-FM.

== History ==
Williams Hall was constructed in 1959 primarily for the use of the communication department at Miami University and for the use of WMUB studios, Miami's campus radio broadcasting station. Prior to the completion of Williams Hall, all broadcasting equipment was housed on the second floor of Harrison Hall. After completion of Williams Hall, the classrooms were cramped due to the need to soundproof rooms for WMUB. Also, Williams Hall only had one bathroom in the entire building. This space proved to be too limited for the direction WMUB and Miami University were headed.

In 1984, Miami University acquired a state-funded grant to renovate the mass communications department in Williams Hall. The $2.2–million grant was appropriated for renovations and additions to the building. The project involved adding and enlarging classrooms, accumulating more restrooms, and building internal and external accesses for the handicapped. This addition was needed for the increase in students and courses in the communication department since the opening of Williams Hall.

After receiving this grant from the state, Miami University began making plans to complete the project by early 1986. At the same time that construction was happening on Williams Hall, Gaskill, Boyd, and Robertson halls were also being modernized, totaling a $6.5 million renovation. Williams Hall ended up using $3.1 million of this (including the $2.2 million grant) because of changes needed to meet stricter codes.

In addition to enlarging classroom size, Miami also wanted to enhance Williams Hall to look more like a Miami building. They lowered the building to allow for entry at all floor levels. Due to the expansion, the parking lot around Williams was significantly reduced. Additionally, asbestos was removed from the building for health reasons.

Construction of Williams Hall was completed in preparation for the 1988–89 academic year. The communications department was moved into the building to accommodate the students and faculty in this field. In 1988, Miami University again received a federal grant, this time for WMUB-FM from the Corporation for Public Broadcasting for $1,998. The money was invested in "tune-in" advertising in order to have people tune into the programs by WMUB. WMUB moved to Williams Hall in 1989, after Williams Hall was re-opened. There were complications in wiring and installation of equipment that caused the postponement. Upon completion of Williams Hall, a dedication ceremony took place in 1989. All speakers at the ceremony were alumni of Miami's mass communication department.

Williams Hall was demolished in June 2026.
