= WTHL =

Christian radio station in Somerset, Kentucky

Coordinates: 37°07′52″N 84°33′15″W

- Somerset, Kentucky; United States
- Broadcast area: South-Central Kentucky
- Frequency: 90.5 MHz
- Branding: King of Kings Radio

Programming
- Format: Christian radio
- Affiliations: Salem Radio Network; VCY America

Ownership
- Owner: Somerset Educational Broadcasting Foundation
- Sister stations: WNFC, WPTJ, WGNH, WZWP

History
- First air date: June 16, 1987

Technical information
- Licensing authority: FCC
- Facility ID: 60782
- Class: C1
- ERP: 50,000 watts
- HAAT: 180 meters (590 ft)

Links
- Public license information: Public file; LMS
- Webcast: Listen live
- Website: kingofkingsradio.com

WTHL (90.5 FM) is a non-commercial radio station licensed to Somerset, Kentucky, United States, serving as the flagship for the King of Kings Christian radio network. Owned and operated by the Somerset Educational Broadcasting Foundation, WTHL is relayed over multiple stations in Kentucky, Ohio, Tennessee, and Virginia.

== Programming ==
King of Kings network programming features a mix of Christian music including southern gospel, as well as Christian talk and teaching shows.

Programs heard on King of Kings Radio include Focus on the Family with Jim Daly and James Dobson, Thru the Bible with J. Vernon McGee, Love Worth Finding with Adrian Rogers, Insight for Living with Chuck Swindoll, In Touch with Charles Stanley, Joni and Friends with Joni Eareckson Tada, and Unshackled!.

== Simulcasts ==
King of Kings Radio is heard on stations in Kentucky, Ohio, Tennessee, and Virginia.

Call sign	Frequency	City of license	FID	Class	ERP (W)	Height (m (ft))
WKCX	89.1 FM	Crittenden, Kentucky	175299	C3	10,000	90 m (300 ft)
WSGP	88.3 FM	Glasgow, Kentucky	91596	C3	13,000	91 m (299 ft)
WNFC	91.7 FM	Paducah, Kentucky	175623	C3	15,000	90.4 m (297 ft)
WNKW	1480 AM	Neon, Kentucky	37154	D	1,000 (day)	—N/a
W290DT	105.9 FM	Neon, Kentucky	200875	D	141	
WIMV	89.3 FM	Owingsville, Kentucky	161760	A	2,000	120 m (390 ft)
WPTJ	90.7 FM	Paris, Kentucky	93789	C3	15,000	96 m (315 ft)
WKKE	88.9 FM	Miamitown, Ohio	93070	A	4,600	114 m (374 ft)
WGNH	94.9 FM	South Webster, Ohio	61177	A	2,200	140 m (460 ft)
WZWP	89.5 FM	West Union, Ohio	74301	B1	3,000	174 m (571 ft)
WWOG	90.9 FM	Cookeville, Tennessee	60780	C1	40,000	208 m (682 ft)
WDIC-FM	92.1 FM	Clinchco, Virginia	16905	A	2,500	154 m (505 ft)
