= Connie Hall =

American musician (1929–2021)

- Birth name: Inez Kerr
- Also known as: Connie Hall
- Born: June 24, 1929
- Origin: Walden, Kentucky
- Died: January 7, 2021 (aged 91)
- Genres: Country; Nashville sound
- Occupation(s): Singer, songwriter
- Instrument: Vocals
- Years active: 1957–1967
- Labels: Mercury Records; Decca Records; Musicor Records
- Formerly of: Margie Bowes, Jean Shepard

Connie Hall (June 24, 1929 – January 7, 2021) was an American singer who had brief success as a country music artist in the late 1950s and 1960s. She was also a songwriter.

== Early life and career beginnings ==
Hall had a career as a country music artist in the late 1950s and 1960s. This was helped by her two hits "Fool Me Once" and "It's Not Wrong". Hall was born in Walden, Kentucky, but grew up in Cincinnati, Ohio. She started singing and performing as a teenager. At age 21, Hall worked at the Jimmie Skinner Music Center in Ohio. She soon got a spot on a radio show on WZIP in Covington, Kentucky, the birthplace of popular 1960s Country singer Skeeter Davis. It was in 1954 that Jimmie Skinner hired Hall to sing on his radio show at WNOP in Newport, Kentucky, and Hall accepted. She appeared on his show, and others, regularly for several years and also worked as a weather girl on Jimmy Skinner's television show.

== Career ==
In 1957, Hall signed a recording contract with Mercury Records. Her recording debut came that same year. The debut single was a duet with Jimmie Skinner called "We've Got Things In Common". The song was very successful, climbing to Top 10 in Billboard. She released her first single as a solo artist in 1958, with the song "I'm the Girl In the USA". Once again, her single climbed the charts.

The following year, 1959, proved to be more successful than the previous two years. The single she released that year, called "The Bottle or Me", peaked in the Country Top 40 and came close to making the Top 20. In 1960, Hall signed on with Decca Records (which would become the future home of Patsy Cline and Loretta Lynn). Her producer Harry Silverstein promised Hall would have a hit. With his help, she soon achieved one. He produced Hall's first two singles, which were released on a back-to-back single. The A-side of the single was the song "There's Poison In Your Hand". The A-side made it to the Country Top 25 in 1960. Its B-side, "It's Not Wrong" (which was an answer song to the 1958 Warner Mack hit "Is it Wrong (For Loving You)?"), became Hall's biggest hit. The song reached the Country Top 20, meaning Hall had achieved an official hit song.

For three more years, Hall remained under Decca Records, making seven more hits, such as "Sleep, Baby Sleep" and "Fool Me Once". Also during this time, she performed on the Grand Ole Opry, Louisiana Hayride, and Midwestern Hayride. In 1964, Hall left Decca Records and switched to Musicor Records, where she remained until 1967.

== Discography ==
=== Singles ===
Year	Single	US Country	Album
1957	"We've Got Things in Common" (with Jimmie Skinner)	—	singles only
1958	"I'm the Girl in the USA"	—	singles only
1959	"You Deserved Your Invitation to the Blues"	—	singles only
1959	"Third Party at the Table"	—	singles only
1959	"The Bottle or Me"	21	singles only
1960	"It's Not Wrong"	17	singles only
1960	"The Poison in Your Hand"	25	singles only
1961	"Sleep, Baby, Sleep"	20	Connie Hall
1961	"I'm as Lonely as Anyone Can Be"	—	Country Songs
1962	"What a Pleasure"	23	Connie Hall
1962	"Half the Time"	—	Country Songs
1963	"Fool Me Once"	14	Country Songs
1963	"It's Not Revenge I Want"	—	Country Songs
1963	"Second Best"	—	Country Songs
1964	"Daddy Doesn't Live Here"	—	Country Songs
1964	"Yellow Roses"	—	Connie Hall
1964	"I Wish I Was in the Bottle"	—	singles only
1965	"King and Queen of Fools"	—	singles only
1965	"The Crowd"	—	singles only
1966	"Making My Plans"	—	singles only
1966	"You Didn't Take Me"	—	singles only

=== Albums ===
Year	Album
1962	Connie Hall
1965	Country Songs
1967	Country Style
