= WPAY (Portsmouth, Ohio) =

Radio station in Portsmouth, Ohio (1925–2011)

- Portsmouth, Ohio; United States
- Broadcast area: Scioto County, Ohio
- Frequency: 1400 kHz

Ownership
- Owner: Douglas L. Braden; (Radio Stations WPAY/WPFB, Inc.)
- Sister stations: WPAY-FM

History
- First air date: February 13, 1925
- Last air date: June 3, 2011
- Former call signs: WHBD (1925–1935)
- Former frequencies: 1350 kHz (1927–1929); 1370 kHz (1929–1940)
- Call sign meaning: "Pay Any Yodler"

Technical information
- Facility ID: 54835
- Class: C
- Power: 800 watts (unlimited)
- Transmitter coordinates: 38°44′06″N 82°59′33″W

WPAY (1400 AM) was an American radio station licensed to serve the community of Portsmouth, Ohio. The station was last owned by Douglas L. Braden and the final broadcast license was held by Radio Stations WPAY/WPFB, Inc. Established in 1925 in Bellefontaine, Ohio, the station ultimately moved to Portsmouth in 1935. WPAY fell silent in June 2011 following the divestiture of sister station WPAY-FM and its license was revoked in June 2012.

== History ==
The station was first licensed, as WHBD, on February 13, 1925 to Charles W. Howard in Bellefontaine, Ohio. The original call letters were randomly assigned from a sequential roster of available call signs. The station later moved to Mt. Orab, over 90 miles (140 km) from Bellefontaine, and ultimately to Portsmouth, over 50 miles (80 km) from Mt. Orab. The call letters were changed to WPAY on March 1, 1935.

After WPAY's owner sold its sister stations to WNKU licensee Northern Kentucky University in January 2011, owner Douglas L. Braden was unable to find a buyer for the lone small-market AM station and the decision was made to take the station off the air for financial reasons while seeking a new buyer. Before falling dark, WPAY broadcast a news/talk radio format branded as "Talk 14" to the Scioto County, Ohio, area.

The station, which began broadcasting in Portsmouth on April 15, 1935, ended over 75 years of service in the city, and 85 years overall, on June 3, 2011. Under the terms of the Telecommunications Act of 1996, as a matter of law a radio station's broadcast license is subject to automatic forfeiture and cancellation if they fail to broadcast for one full year. After the station's broadcast license was revoked, the WPAY call sign was deleted from the Federal Communications Commission database on June 8, 2012.
