= Dick Pike =

Dick (Richard) Pike
- Born: November 7, 1924; Chicago, Illinois
- Died: August 16, 2003 (aged 78); Elsmere, KY
- Presenting career
- Station: WNOP
- Station: WJW-TV
- Style: Disc Jockey

Dick Pike (November 7, 1924 – August 16, 2003) was a disc jockey and general manager who turned WNOP (740) into a jazz station.

== Career ==
Pike worked most of his career at WNOP, a jazz station with studios in Newport, KY. When Pike returned to the station in 1961 - as General Manager - he instituted the Jazz format with his personal record collection.

Pike also spent time at television station WJW, in Cleveland, before returning to WNOP as general manager.

Pike also introduced acts at the Newport Jazz Festival in 1964 for George Wein

== Death ==
Pike died August 16, 2003, in Elsmere, Kentucky.
