= WJCR-FM =

- Upton, Kentucky; United States
- Broadcast area: Elizabethtown, Kentucky; Glasgow, Kentucky
- Frequency: 90.1 MHz
- Branding: Where Jesus Christ Reigns

Programming
- Format: Southern gospel
- Affiliations: Salem Communications

Ownership
- Owner: FM 90.1, Inc.

History
- First air date: February 1990
- Call sign meaning: "Where Jesus Christ Reigns"

Technical information
- Licensing authority: FCC
- Facility ID: 21837
- Class: C1
- ERP: 100,000 watts
- HAAT: 117 meters (384 ft)
- Transmitter coordinates: 37°25′57.1″N 86°01′49.8″W

Links
- Public license information: Public file; LMS
- Webcast: listen live
- Website: wjcr.org

WJCR-FM (90.1 FM) is a southern gospel music radio station that is licensed to Upton, Kentucky, United States, and serves the Elizabethtown and Glasgow areas. The station is owned by FM 90.1, Inc. and features programming from Salem Communications.

The broadcast facilities of WJCR are located at 13101 Raider Hollow Road in rural northwest Hart County off Kentucky Route 224 between Upton and Millerstown.

== History ==
The station was issued the call sign WJCR on October 18, 1989. (Note: The "-FM" suffix was added on May 15, 1992.) The station signed on the air in February 1990.

Until 2015, the station's programming was also available in full via Paducah, Kentucky-licensed WNFC. In 2015, WNFC became a full-time affiliate of the Somerset, Kentucky-based King of Kings Radio Network.
