= WGNH =

- South Webster, Ohio; United States
- Broadcast area: Huntington, West Virginia
- Frequency: 94.9 MHz
- Branding: King of Kings Radio

Programming
- Format: Christian Radio
- Affiliations: King of Kings Radio

Ownership
- Owner: Somerset Educational Broadcasting Foundation
- Sister stations: WTHL, WNFC, WPTJ, WZWP

History
- First air date: 1996
- Former call signs: WZIO (1991–2002); WRAU (2002–2004); WSNA (2004–2006); WEKV (2006–2017)

Technical information
- Licensing authority: FCC
- Facility ID: 61177
- Class: A
- ERP: 2,200 watts
- HAAT: 140 meters (460 ft)
- Transmitter coordinates: 38°45′39.00″N 82°43′17.00″W

Links
- Public license information: Public file; LMS
- Webcast: Listen Live
- Website: kingofkingsradio.org

WGNH (94.9 FM) is a radio station broadcasting a Christian radio format. Licensed to South Webster, Ohio, United States, it serves the Huntington, West Virginia area. The station is currently owned by Somerset Educational Broadcasting Foundation.

WGNH's programming includes Christian talk and teaching shows such as Back to the Bible, Focus on the Family, Love Worth Finding with Adrian Rogers, In Touch with Charles Stanley, Tony Evans, and Unshackled!. WGNH also airs a variety of Christian music.

== 2017 sale ==
On February 14, 2017, it was announced that former owner Educational Media Foundation (EMF) would sell the then-WEKV as part of its purchase of WNKE (now WPYK) in neighboring New Boston, Ohio, which at the time the sale was announced operated as a repeater of WNKU, from Northern Kentucky University (NKU). As part of the WNKE sale agreement, NKU would receive $750,000 plus 75% of the net sale proceeds of WEKV.

The station changed its call sign to WGNH on August 10, 2017. On August 15, 2017, Somerset Educational Broadcasting Foundation of Somerset, Kentucky announced that they had purchased WGNH from Educational Media Foundation for $130,000. Under the terms of the sale of WNKE to Educational Media Foundation, Northern Kentucky University received $97,500 of the proceeds of the sale of WGNH. Immediately upon announcement of the sale, WGNH dropped Educational Media Foundation's K-Love brand (EMF having moved K-Love to the newly acquired WNKE, which was, at that time, temporarily identifying under its former WPAY-FM call sign) and began broadcasting under Somerset Educational Broadcasting Foundation's King of Kings Radio branding.
