= Jimmie Skinner =

American singer-songwriter

Background information
- Born: April 27, 1909; Blue Lick, Kentucky, United States
- Died: October 28, 1979 (aged 70) Hendersonville, Tennessee, United States
- Genres: Country, bluegrass
- Occupation: Musician
- Instrument: Guitar
- Years active: 1940s–1979
- Labels: Red Barn, King, Capitol, Decca, Mercury, Starday, Rich-R-Tone

Jimmie Skinner (April 27, 1909 – October 28, 1979) was an American country and bluegrass music singer, songwriter and acoustic guitarist. He also was known for a mail-order record business and retail store in Cincinnati, Ohio.

== Biography ==
Skinner was born in Blue Lick, near Berea, Kentucky, United States. In his teens, he moved with his family to Hamilton, Ohio, where he began performing on local radio stations. He and his brother Esmer unsuccessfully auditioned for Gennett Records in 1931 and Bluebird Records in 1941. Ernest Tubb landed a hit with Skinner's composition "Let's Say Goodbye (Like We Said Hello)" in 1946. The following year Skinner saw his first record releases on Red Barn, a custom vanity label based in Chicago, Illinois, and Kansas City, Missouri.

After moving to Cincinnati, Ohio, Skinner met Lou Epstein, a former sales manager for King Records then operating his own label, Radio Artist. Epstein signed the singer to a managerial and recording contract in 1949; a cover of Jimmy Work's "Tennessee Border" became Skinner's first chart hit. Skinner's early records were notable for their sparse instrumentation, usually backed by electric mandolinist, Ray Lunsford. Skinner's early sides have been cited as an influence on Johnny Cash, who covered his chain gang song "Doin' My Time" for Sun Records. Other Skinner compositions that became country and bluegrass standards are "Will You Be Satisfied That Way" and "Don't Give Your Heart to a Rambler".

In the early 1950s, Epstein opened The Jimmie Skinner Music Center, a Cincinnati mail-order and retail record store, that advertised heavily on WCKY-AM and other country music stations. Skinner also hosted a one-hour remote dee jay broadcast from the store's display window. Throughout the early 1950s, Skinner recorded for Capitol Records (1950–53) and Decca Records (1953–56), but his most successful label association was with Mercury Records, between 1957 and 1961. His late 1950s recordings of "What Makes a Man Wander", "Dark Hollow" and "I Found My Girl in the USA" reached the top 10 of the Billboard charts. He also recorded duets with Connie Hall, a frequent guest on his radio show over WNOP-AM in Newport, Kentucky. Resisting Mercury's attempts to change his signature style, he joined Starday Records.

After Epstein's 1963 death from a brain tumor, Skinner's career fell into a decline. He later became a fixture on the bluegrass festival circuit and resumed his recording career, primarily album releases for small labels including Rich-R-Tone Records. In 1974, Skinner moved to Nashville, Tennessee, where he continued to write songs and play festivals until his death five years later.

Skinner died from a heart attack in October 1979, in Hendersonville, Tennessee.

== Recent releases ==
In 2003 Bear Family Records issued Doin' My Time, a five-CD boxed set collecting all of Skinner's surviving Red Barn, Radio Artist, Capitol, Decca and Mercury recordings, plus a sixth disc of Skinner reading from his unfinished autobiography.

== Singles ==
Year	Single	US Country
1949	"Tennessee Border"	15
1957	"I Found My Girl in the USA"	5
1958	"What Makes a Man Wander"	8
1959	"Walkin' My Blues Away"	21
1959	"Dark Hollow"	7
1959	"John Wesley Hardin"	17
1960	"Riverboat Gambler"	14
1960	"Lonesome Road Blues"	21
1960	"Reasons to Live"	13
1960	"Careless Love"	30
