= WNKW =

- Neon, Kentucky; United States
- Frequency: 1480 kHz
- Branding: King of Kings Radio

Programming
- Format: Christian
- Affiliations: King of Kings Radio

Ownership
- Owner: Somerset Educational Broadcasting Foundation

History
- First air date: July 1, 1956 (as WNKY)
- Former call signs: WNKY (1956–1995); WEZC (1995–2006); WVSG (2006–2009); WGCK (2009–2011); WIZD (2012–2015); WUKB (2015–2018)

Technical information
- Licensing authority: FCC
- Facility ID: 37154
- Class: D
- Power: 1,000 watts day
- Transmitter coordinates: 37°11′54″N 82°42′42″W
- Translator: 105.9 W290DT (Neon)

Links
- Public license information: Public file; LMS
- Webcast: Listen Online
- Website: www.kingofkingsradio.com

WNKW (1480 AM) is a radio station licensed to Neon, Kentucky, United States. The station is owned by Somerset Educational Broadcasting Foundation and airs a Christian format as an owned and operated affiliate of King of Kings Radio.

== History ==
The station went on the air as WNKY on July 1, 1956. On August 31, 2006, the station changed its call sign to WVSG. On April 13, 2009, WVSG became WGCK, taking its callsign from sister station WGCK-FM, and then changed again to WIZD on February 8, 2011. As of July 21, 2015, was called WUKB.

On June 1, 2018, the station changed its call sign to WNKW. It also broadcasts on an FM translator at 105.9 MHz.
