= Cincinnati Public Radio =

Public radio station in Cincinnati, Ohio

- Formation: 1944
- Type: Non-profit
- Location: United States

Cincinnati Public Radio, Inc. is the broadcast license holder for WGUC (90.9) and WVXU (91.7), two FM radio stations broadcasting to the Greater Cincinnati area with classical music, news, information, and entertainment programming. The organization also operates FM radio station WMUB (88.5 MHz) in Oxford, Ohio.

The company is an IRS 501(c)(3) non-profit organization led by a local Board of Directors and a professional staff conducting day-to-day business.

The company was originally founded in 1994 as Cincinnati Classical Public Radio, which took over day-to-day operations of WGUC, then owned by the University of Cincinnati. CCPR bought the WGUC license from UC in 2002.

WGUC is Cincinnati's oldest and largest public radio station, founded in 1960 for cultural and public affairs programming. Today, it broadcasts classical music 24 hours a day. WVXU became a part of Cincinnati Public Radio on August 22, 2005. It broadcasts news and information programming, as well as national and international sources. On March 1, 2009, Cincinnati Public Radio took over operations of WMUB from Miami University.

In addition to the three terrestrial radio signals, the stations offer online streaming of their broadcasts via the web, via mobile apps allowing listening on smartphones and tablet computers, and maintain a presence on the iHeartRadio app.

== See also ==
- Public Media Connect
