= WKKE =

Radio station in Miamitown–Cincinnati, Ohio

- Miamitown, Ohio; United States
- Broadcast area: Greater Cincinnati
- Frequency: 88.9 MHz
- Branding: King of Kings Radio

Programming
- Format: Christian
- Network: King of Kings Radio

Ownership
- Owner: Somerset Educational Broadcasting Foundation
- Sister stations: WTHL

History
- First air date: August 6, 2006
- Former call signs: WMWX (2006-2025)

Technical information
- Licensing authority: FCC
- Facility ID: 93070
- Class: A
- ERP: 4,600 watts
- HAAT: 114 meters (374 ft)
- Transmitter coordinates: 39°19′18.00″N 84°57′33.00″W

Links
- Public license information: Public file; LMS
- Webcast: Listen live
- Website: kingofkingsradio.com

WKKE (88.9 FM) is a non-commercial radio station licensed to Miamitown, Ohio. The station is owned by Somerset Educational Broadcasting Foundation and airs a Christian format as an owned and operated affiliate of King of Kings Radio. The station's transmitter resides in Brookville, Indiana.

WKKE primarily serves western parts of Greater Cincinnati.

== History ==
Originally holding the call sign WMWX, the station signed on the air with 5,000 watts on August 6, 2006. WMWX had an all-volunteer staff with live on-air disc jockeys and aired a variety of classic rock, as well as specialty shows featuring The Beatles (Beatles-a-Rama), Pink Floyd (Floydian Slip), and Reelin' In The Years (a locally produced program that features a weekly theme). In 2011, WMWX expanded its broadcasting signal to simulcasting on 89.1 FM (WKCX) in Cincinnati as well as 89.1 FM (WYNS) in Waynesville, Ohio.

On April 19, 2019, WMWX and its repeater stations dropped the "ClassX" classic rock format and began stunting and launched a Christian classic hits format two days later, branded as "Touch FM" and on November 1, 2019, dropped TouchFM and returned to airing ClassX Radio's format. In 2019, WKCX was transferred to the Somerset Educational Broadcasting Foundation, owners of the King of Kings Radio network, with WKCX becoming part of that network. In July 2025, WMWX was sold to Somerset Educational Broadcasting Foundation for $157,500, and it became an affiliate of the King of Kings Radio network, with its callsign changing the following month to WKKE.
