= WKSG (FM) =

- Garrison, Kentucky; United States
- Broadcast area: Portsmouth, Ohio
- Frequency: 98.3 MHz
- Branding: 98.3 The Rock

Programming
- Format: Southern gospel

Ownership
- Owner: Strong Tower Christian Media

History
- First air date: 1998 (as WOKE)
- Former call signs: WNUU (1992–1997); WOKE (1997–2018); WPAY-FM (2018–2021); WFHT (2021); WZGR (2021–2022); WFHT (2022); WITO (2022); WIRO (2022)

Technical information
- Licensing authority: FCC
- Facility ID: 53102
- Class: A
- ERP: 5,200 watts
- HAAT: 107 meters (351 ft)
- Transmitter coordinates: 38°36′26.00″N 83°02′33.00″W

Links
- Public license information: Public file; LMS
- Webcast: Listen Live
- Website: 983therock.com

WKSG (98.3 MHz) is an FM radio station broadcasting and licensed to Garrison, Kentucky, United States; the station is currently owned by Strong Tower Christian Media. and serves Portsmouth, OH and the OH-KY-WV Tri-State area. The station's transmitter tower is located in Greenup County near the community of Garrison and the Lewis County line.

== History ==
Originally licensed in 1998 as WOKE and branded as Joy FM playing southern gospel music, the station subsequently shifted to contemporary Christian music branded as Ignite FM, before flipping to a secular contemporary hit radio format branded as Pulse 98.3. In 2018, the station was sold to Fowler Media Partners.

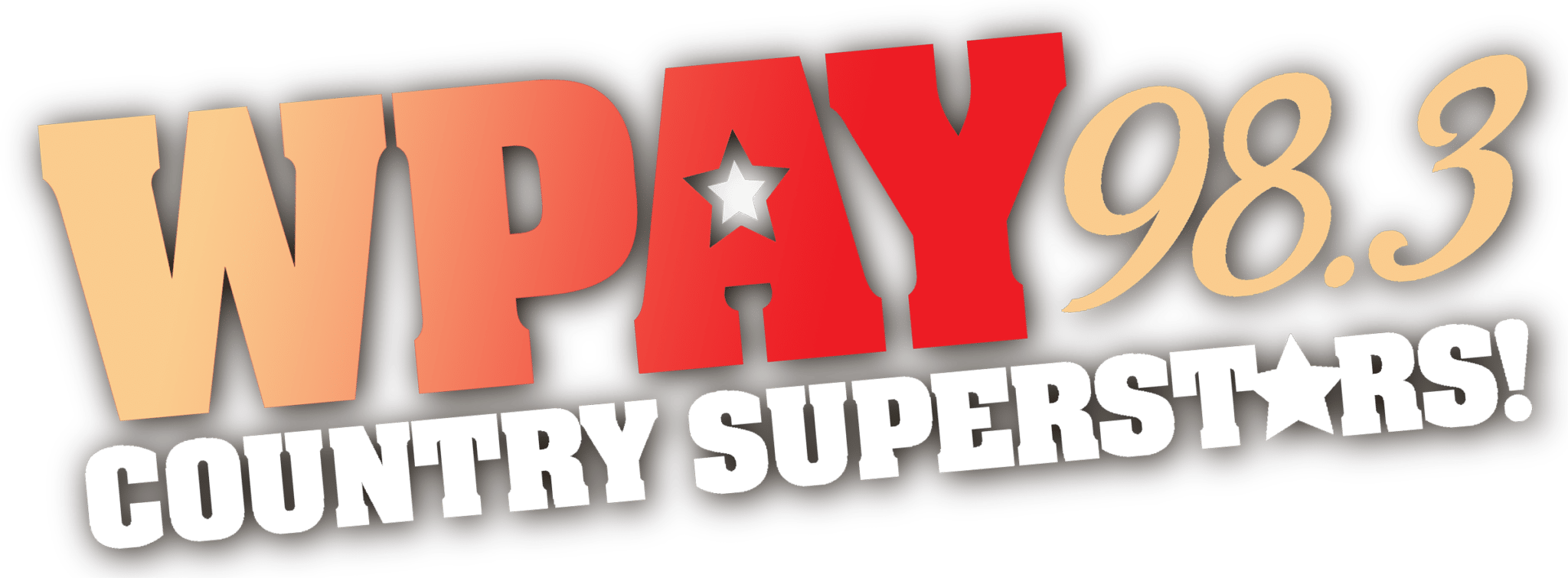
Logo as WPAY-FM

In March 2018, the station stunted as "Trump 98.3" for a week, promising to "Make Radio Great Again". This emulated a similar stunt by related station WVWF, with a playlist of songs referencing money, patriotism, and walls. On March 8, 2018, WOKE flipped to a "Country Superstars" format and changed its call sign to WPAY-FM. The call sign was acquired from the local K-Love station now known as WPYK, which operated as a country station under the WPAY-FM call sign from 1966 until 2011 and again briefly identifying as WPAY-FM in 2017–2018 after assuming the K-Love format. Sean King of WOKE became the morning host on the new WPAY-FM.

The station changed its call sign to WFHT on July 23, 2021, and to WZGR on October 25, 2021.

On November 29, 2021, WZGR changed its format from classic country to southern gospel, branded as "Grace-FM 98.3".

On January 17, 2022, WZGR changed its format from southern gospel to hot adult contemporary, branded as "98.3 Hot-FM" and changed its call sign back to WFHT on January 26, then changed them again to WITO on March 6. The WITO call sign was then swapped with the former WIRO in Ironton, Ohio, on May 10.

Fowler Media Partners announced the sale of WIRO, which by then had shifted to contemporary hit radio, to Strong Tower Christian Media of Xenia, Ohio, with the intention of returning the station to a southern gospel format using an LMA even before the completion of the sale, late in 2022. The station changed its call sign to WKSG on October 20, 2022; on November 23, the station began stunting with Christmas music as "98.3 The Rock" as Strong Tower began operation of the station by local marketing agreement. The sale was consummated on November 30, 2022. On December 26, 2022, the station launched a full time Southern Gospel Hits format.
