= WVXU =

Public radio station in Cincinnati

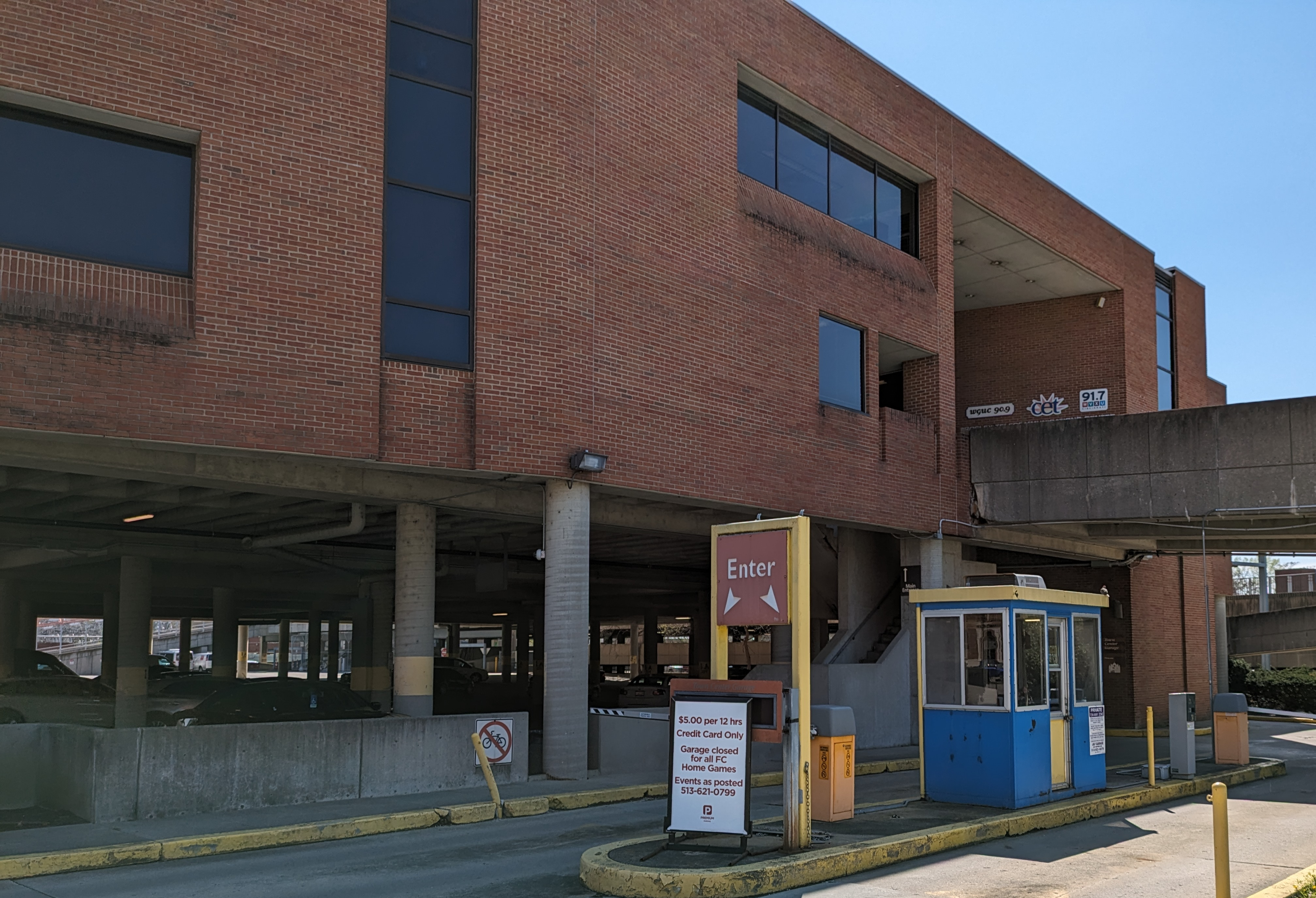
- Crosley Telecommunications Center, former location of WVXU studios and offices

Cincinnati, Ohio; United States
- Broadcast area: Cincinnati metropolitan area
- Frequency: 91.7 MHz
- Branding: Cincinnati Public Radio

Programming
- Format: Public radio and talk
- Affiliations: NPR; APM; PRX; BBC World Service

Ownership
- Owner: Cincinnati Public Radio
- Sister stations: WGUC, WMUB

History
- First air date: August 5, 1970
- Call sign meaning: Voice of Xavier University (former licensee)

Technical information
- Licensing authority: FCC
- Facility ID: 74302
- Class: B
- ERP: 26,000 watts
- HAAT: 208 meters (682 ft)
- Transmitter coordinates: 39°07′31″N 84°29′57″W

Links
- Public license information: Public file; LMS
- Webcast: Listen live
- Website: wvxu.org

WVXU (91.7 FM) is a non-commercial radio station licensed to Cincinnati, Ohio, United States, serving the Cincinnati metropolitan area. Owned by Cincinnati Public Radio (CPRI), it is a member of NPR and features a news, talk and information format. The studios and offices are located in the Cincinnati Public Radio building on Dana Avenue in the Evanston neighborhood.

The transmitter is on Symmes Street in Cincinnati, also near Interstate 71. WVXU's programming is simulcast on 88.5 WMUB in Oxford.

== History ==
=== Xavier University radio ===
WVXU signed on the air on August 5, 1970. It was originally licensed to Xavier University, primarily airing a progressive rock format with some specialty programming including jazz and R&B.

WVXU was a college radio station, set up to give students exposure to the broadcasting industry and as a service to Xavier's surrounding community. As a Jesuit Catholic university, Xavier also aired some religious broadcasts on WVXU. It was originally powered at 630 watts, a fraction of its current output. After it got a power boost the university decided to make it more of a public radio station.

=== NPR membership ===
WVXU became an NPR member station when the network's wake-up newsmagazine Morning Edition was added to the schedule in 1981. The original NPR member for the Cincinnati area, WGUC, did not want to replace its popular morning drive time classical music show with a network news program, so WVXU started carrying Morning Edition and a few other NPR informational programs. For a time, WGUC continued carrying NPR's flagship afternoon newsmagazine All Things Considered.

WVXU then added more news and talk programs to supplement its eclectic music playlist, coinciding with the expansion of NPR's schedule in the 1980s. While WGUC and WVXU between them provided most of the NPR programs available in Cincinnati, the two NPR flagship news magazines aired separately. WVXU featured programs from the "Golden Age of Radio" and in 1994 won the Peabody Award for the station's 12-hour "D-Day Plus 50 Years" broadcast commemorating the anniversary of D-Day, capturing the day's history through historic broadcast recordings. In the early 2000s, the university decided to end its involvement in the radio station.

=== Cincinnati Public Radio ===
On August 22, 2005, Xavier transferred ownership WVXU and its "X-Star Network" of rebroadcasting stations to CPRI in a $15-million transaction. That brought WVXU and WGUC under the same licensee. This permitted elimination of program duplication and a realignment of formats. WGUC transferred nearly all of its remaining spoken-word programming, including All Things Considered, to WVXU.

WGUC now airs classical music almost exclusively, while WVXU carries news and information programs, including both NPR flagship news magazines. For a time, WVXU carried some music programs on weeknights and weekends after the ownership change.

Cincinnati Public Radio took over management of 88.5 WMUB in March 2009, a station owned and run by Miami University in Oxford, Ohio. As part of the deal, Miami retained ownership of the station, which serves southwestern Ohio and southeastern Indiana, though it is now a full-time satellite of WVXU. WMUB brings WVXU's programming to areas north of Cincinnati where the main signal is weak.

== Programming ==
WVXU and WMUB carry programs from NPR and other public radio networks. The weekday schedule includes Morning Edition, All Things Considered, Marketplace, Here and Now and Fresh Air with the BBC World Service heard overnight. In addition, a one-hour locally produced interview and talk show, Cincinnati Edition, airs each weekday at noon, with a repeat at 8 p.m. Weekends feature popular one-hour specialty shows including A Way with Words, On The Media, Freakonomics Radio, Travel with Rick Steves, The Splendid Table, Snap Judgment, Latino USA, The Moth Radio Hour, Radiolab, Hidden Brain, The New Yorker Radio Hour, This American Life, You Bet Your Garden and Wait, Wait, Don't Tell Me.

WVXU has a news team who reports updates during the week and prepares segments for Cincinnati Edition. The station's website is augmented by Howard Wilkinson (Blogger and Politics Reporter) and John Kiesewetter (Media Blogger). In 2021, WVXU dropped the few remaining music programs continued after the 2005 takeover. The station is now 100% news, talk and information.

== Community events ==
Since CPRI began operating WVXU in August 2005, the station has brought in a variety of public radio hosts and programs and acts as media sponsor for various community-wide events.

Examples of shows and hosts who have visited Cincinnati: live broadcasts of Wait, Wait, Don't Tell Me, A Prairie Home Companion, Whad'Ya Know? and Talk of the Nation. There were visits from Ira Glass, host of This American Life, Lynne Rossetto Kasper of The Splendid Table, Terry Gross of Fresh Air, Diane Rehm of The Diane Rehm Show and Carl Kasell of NPR News and Wait, Wait, Don't Tell Me.

== Former satellite stations ==
Shortly after CPRI acquired WVXU, it sold the network of rebroadcasting stations ("X-Star") that Xavier University had built in rural parts of Ohio and Michigan during the 1990s to provide service to those outside the clear signal of another NPR affiliate. The Ohio frequencies were acquired by an evangelical Christian radio broadcaster, while the Michigan stations were sold to commercial interests.

In addition to WVXU, the X-Star network included:

- WVXA Rogers City, Michigan (now 96.7 WRGZ)
- WVXC Chillicothe, Ohio (now 89.3 WZCP)
- WVXG Mount Gilead, Ohio (95.1)
- WVXH Harrison, Michigan (now 92.1 WTWS)
- WVXI Crawfordsville, Indiana (now 106.3 WCDQ (FM))
- WVXM West Union, Ohio/Maysville, Kentucky (now 89.5 WZWP)
- WVXM Manistee, Michigan (now 97.7 WMLQ)
- WVXR New Paris, Ohio/Richmond, Indiana (now 89.3 WKRT)
- W237CF Mackinaw City, Michigan

== HD radio ==
WVXU broadcasts using HD Radio technology. In addition to airing its regular programming in digital sound on its primary HD Radio subchannel, WVXU airs Radio Artifact, a local music service owned and produced by Northside's Urban Artifact on WVXU-HD2.

== See also ==
- Cincinnati Public Radio
- WMUB
