= WGUC =

Public radio station in Cincinnati

Coordinates: 39.125°N 84.499°W

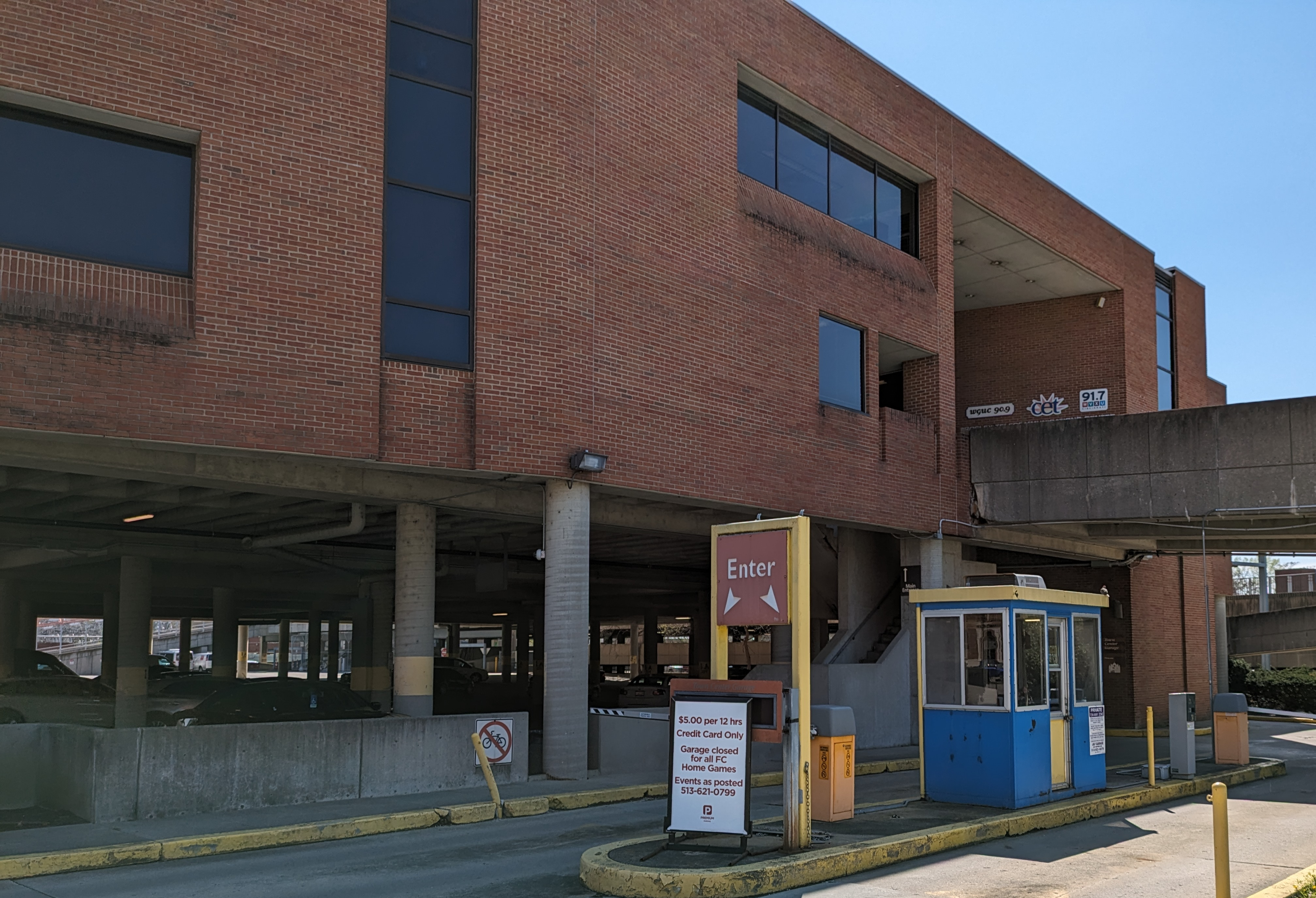
- Crosley Telecommunications Center, former location of WGUC studios

Cincinnati, Ohio; United States
- Broadcast area: Cincinnati metropolitan area
- Frequency: 90.9 MHz (HD Radio)
- Branding: Classical 90.9 WGUC

Programming
- Format: Classical music (Public)
- Subchannels: HD2: Jazz; HD3: Adult album alternative
- Affiliations: NPR; APM; Classical 24

Ownership
- Owner: Cincinnati Public Radio
- Sister stations: WVXU

History
- First air date: September 21, 1960

Technical information
- Licensing authority: FCC
- Facility ID: 6126
- Class: B
- ERP: 18,500 watts
- HAAT: 209.2 meters (686 ft)

Links
- Public license information: Public file; LMS
- Webcast: Listen live
- Website: wguc.org

WGUC (90.9 FM) is a non-commercial educational radio station licensed to Cincinnati, Ohio, United States. It is owned by Cincinnati Public Radio and has a classical music format. WGUC broadcasts using HD Radio technology and plays jazz on WGUC-HD2 and adult album alternative on WGUC-HD3. WGUC's studios are located in the Cincinnati Public Radio building on Dana Avenue in the Evanston neighborhood.

Its transmitter is on Symmes Street, near Interstate 71, in Cincinnati.

== History ==
=== Fine arts station ===
In the late 1950s, a group of Cincinnati-area residents launched a campaign for a radio station devoted to cultural and public affairs programming, particularly classical music. A committee of the Queen City Association sought to bring either a repeater of WOSU-AM-FM in Columbus or a standalone fine arts station to Cincinnati.

WGUC signed on the air on September 21, 1960. The station was originally licensed to the University of Cincinnati, at the time owned by the City of Cincinnati. WGUC broadcast mostly classical music and was a training ground for students interested in a career in broadcasting.

=== NPR programming ===
When National Public Radio was first formed in the early 1970s, WGUC interrupted its classical music in afternoon drive time to carry All Things Considered. However, when NPR began offering additional weekday programming in the 1980s, that created the need for an additional NPR outlet in Cincinnati, at which time 91.7 WVXU (then licensed to Xavier University) became an NPR member station.

While the two stations both carried some NPR programs, the two NPR daily flagship newsmagazines aired separately. WVXU carried Morning Edition, while WGUC continued airing All Things Considered. With both stations now under the same licensee, program duplication, sometimes a problem in markets with more than one public radio station, were eliminated. This means that WGUC broadcasts almost exclusively classical music, while WVXU carries news and information programming, including both Morning Edition and All Things Considered.

WGUC was one of the first stations in the nation to meet the Corporation for Public Broadcasting's qualification standards; a charter member of NPR; and a founder of another network, American Public Radio (now Public Radio International). WGUC also had one of the first NPR satellite uplinks, the first digital west-to-east transatlantic broadcast, and is the only U.S. public radio station with an ongoing program to commission new music.

=== Change in ownership ===
In 1994, UC outsourced WGUC's operations to Cincinnati Classical Public Radio, a community-based nonprofit organization. UC retained the station's license until 2002, when it sold the license to Cincinnati Public Radio. When Cincinnati Public Radio purchased Xavier University's "X-Star Network" (a group of stations headed by WVXU-FM) in 2005, WGUC moved its National Public Radio news and talk programming, including All Things Considered, which had aired on WGUC since the 1970s, to WVXU. The only NPR-produced show still airing on WGUC is the youth classical performance program From the Top, while the news and information programming is heard on WVXU around the clock, except for a couple hours of specialty music programming late nights.

In 2003, WGUC became the first public radio station in Ohio to broadcast a digital HD Radio signal. In June 2005, WGUC became one of the first stations in the nation to receive FCC authorization to experiment with FM multicasting. In 2006, the station added a full time digital subchannel of jazz music (formerly heard on WVXU), along classical music on its primary digital channel. It has since added adult album alternative music to an HD-3 subchannel.

== Programming ==
=== Weekly schedule ===
WGUC has local hosts on weekdays. Overnight, Classical 24 from Minnesota Public Radio is heard. And on weekends, it carries several public radio specialty shows, such as Pipedreams and Performance Today Weekend from American Public Media (APM), Sunday Baroque from WSHU-FM in Connecticut and From The Top from NPR.

WGUC broadcasts local musical events, including the Cincinnati Symphony Orchestra concerts, the Cincinnati May Festival, and the Cincinnati Opera season. The station produces and distributes The 90 Second Naturalist and Classics for Kids nationally. Holiday programs, such as Tunes From the Crypt (Halloween), A Feast For the Ears (Thanksgiving), and Love Greetings (Valentine's Day) have also had national carriage. One weekday feature, Cincinnati Spotlight, which airs weekdays during the 9:00 a.m. hour, highlights events in the listening area, local artists and musicians, and national and international performers who visit greater Cincinnati.

=== Classics for Kids ===
Classics for Kids debuted December 5, 1998 and is designed to help adults introduce children to classical music. The program, heard Saturday mornings and Sunday evenings, features a composer and his/her music, along with games, quizzes and curriculum materials for primary grade school students and teachers. The show is heard on several other classical-formatted public radio stations in the U.S.

=== Radio Reading Service ===
WGUC's subcarrier signal has served the local blind and visually impaired community since 1985. Through an agreement with the Cincinnati Association for the Blind, WGUC carries the audio broadcasts for the Radio Reading Service (RRS) on its alternate band. RRS serves more than 8,000 listeners, according to the station.
