= WPYK =

- Portsmouth, Ohio; United States
- Broadcast area: Portsmouth, Ohio-Ashland, Kentucky-Huntington, West Virginia
- Frequency: 104.1 MHz
- Branding: K-Love

Programming
- Format: Contemporary Christian
- Network: K-Love

Ownership
- Owner: Educational Media Foundation
- Sister stations: WHKU

History
- First air date: 1948
- Former call signs: WPAY-FM (1948–2011); WNKE (2011–2017); WPAY-FM (2017–2018)
- Call sign meaning: "WPAY" — "K-Love" (former callsign, current format)

Technical information
- Licensing authority: FCC
- Facility ID: 54813
- Class: C0
- ERP: 100,000 watts
- HAAT: 450 meters (1,480 ft)
- Transmitter coordinates: 38°41′0″N 83°0′46″W
- Translator: 93.3 W227AX (Morehead)

Links
- Public license information: Public file; LMS
- Webcast: Listen live
- Website: www.klove.com

WPYK (104.1 FM) is a radio station licensed to Portsmouth, Ohio. The station became notable when it stayed on air during the floods in Portsmouth in 1937, giving up-to-the-minute news and announcements to those separated and weary from the floods. In the 1960s, the then-WPAY-FM started to play country music on its FM while its AM sister station was reassigned to have a news-talk format. The AM signed off the air on June 3, 2011, after 80 years. WPYK is currently a K-Love affiliate station broadcasting a contemporary Christian format and is owned by Educational Media Foundation.

WPYK has one of the most powerful radio antennas in Southern Ohio and had one of the tallest radio towers, standing over 200 meters high overlooking the Ohio River in Kentucky. Due to the station having an ERP of 100,000 watts, its signal can be heard as far away as Columbus, Ohio, Beckley, West Virginia, Lexington, Kentucky, and Cincinnati, Ohio. This tower collapsed from the weight of the ice during an ice storm on February 19, 2003, and put the station off the air for a couple of days. The fall of this tower not only put out WPAY radio, but all of Scioto county public safety communication services. All services were restored by nightfall, February 21, 2003. In 2006 a new tower just to the southwest of Portsmouth and the location of their old tower was built. It is 356 meters tall, or 450 meters above average terrain and features an ERI brand 12-bay directional antenna spaced at a half-wavelength.

== Switch to public radio ==
Beginning on February 1, 2011, WPAY-FM, along with its then-sister station WPFB-FM 105.9 in Middletown, Ohio, began simulcasting the signal of Northern Kentucky University-owned WNKU. At that time, WPAY-FM switched from a country format to an adult album alternative (AAA) format. While this management and format change was initially completed under a management operating agreement, NKU assumed ownership of both stations once approval was received from the Federal Communications Commission (FCC). WPAY's AM station was not included in the sale, and continued to broadcast conservative talk programming until closing down at 2 p.m. on June 3, 2011, due to the station's entire staff being terminated as a result of the sale of WPAY-FM. The sale was approved by the FCC on June 20, 2011, and the station officially changed their call letters to WNKE on that date.

== 2017 sale and K-Love affiliation ==
In April 2016, citing state budget cuts to education, Northern Kentucky University announced that it would "explore the possibility of a sale of WNKU-FM and its assets". On February 14, 2017, NKU's board of trustees voted to approve the sale of the WNKE repeater to the Educational Media Foundation (owners of the K-Love and Air1 networks) for $750,000 plus 75% of the net sale proceeds of EMF-owned WEKV in South Webster, Ohio (ultimately receiving $97,500 of the proceeds of the sale of WEKV to Somerset Educational Broadcasting Foundation of Somerset, Kentucky). This was done at the same time the sale of WNKU's license and transmitter site to the Bible Broadcasting Network was approved for $1.9 million. The stations continued to be operated by NKU as WNKU until the sales were approved by the Federal Communications Commission.

On July 28, 2017, WNKU announced on their Facebook page that the sales of WNKU and WNKE had been approved by the FCC. It was also announced that the last day of WNKU broadcasting on WNKE would be on Wednesday, August 2, 2017. At midnight on Thursday, August 3, 2017, the station officially changed format to contemporary Christian, adopting the K-Love branding and identifying under its original WPAY-FM call sign. The station changed its call sign to the current WPYK on March 1, 2018, transferring the WPAY-FM call sign to the owners of the former WOKE as part of their format change to country music.
