= WMUB (FM) =

Public radio station in Oxford, Ohio

Satellite of WVXU, Cincinnati
- Oxford, Ohio; United States
- Broadcast area: Southwest Ohio; southeast Indiana
- Frequency: 88.5 MHz (HD Radio)

Programming
- Format: News/talk (Public)
- Affiliations: NPR; American Public Media; Public Radio Exchange

Ownership
- Owner: Miami University; (The President & Trustees of Miami University)
- Operator: Cincinnati Public Radio

History
- First air date: 1950
- Call sign meaning: Miami University Broadcasting

Technical information
- Licensing authority: FCC
- Facility ID: 66278
- Class: B
- ERP: 24,500 watts
- HAAT: 154 meters (505 ft)
- Transmitter coordinates: 39°33′26.1″N 84°47′34.8″W

Links
- Public license information: Public file; LMS
- Webcast: Listen live
- Website: www.wmub.org

WMUB (88.5 MHz) is a public FM radio station licensed to Miami University, in Oxford, Ohio, United States. It produced local programming for 59 years until March 1, 2009, when it became a part of Cincinnati Public Radio. The station serves southwest Ohio and southeast Indiana. WMUB started as a student-operated station in the 1940s and turned FM in 1950. Once known for its "Rhythm and News", it is a full-time satellite of WVXU in Cincinnati. It primarily serves areas north of Cincinnati where the main WVXU signal is weak.

The station operates via a 24,500-watt transmitter located on Taylor Road in Butler County. WMUB broadcasts in the HD Radio format.

Prior to becoming a Cincinnati Public Radio repeater, WMUB was historically a resource to enable Miami University students studying broadcasting and journalism to train in reporting and on-air delivery. WMUB listeners also tuned in on weekday nights to listen to the voice of Mama Jazz, Phyllis Campbell, who hosted an evening show, broadcast from 8 to 11 pm.

In 1988, Miami University received a federal grant from the Corporation for Public Broadcasting for $1,998. The money was invested in “tune-in” advertising in order to have people tune into the programs by WMUB. The station was housed in Williams Hall starting in 1989.

In 2000, WMUB celebrated its 50th anniversary. Miami University organized a sold-out reception at Kettering's Presidential Banquet Center in Dayton, Ohio. WMUB began to not only partake in radio broadcast, but in the early 2000s added new media, such as web, podcasts and HD Radio to their broadcasts. WMUB became the 7th station in the nation to offer multiple HD streams.

In January 2007, the University President, David C. Hodge, charged a committee to explore alternatives to address budgetary and technological challenges for WMUB. The university owns the radio station’s license and covered nearly 62 percent of its $1.7 million budget. The committee released its report in fall 2007 and strongly recommended pursuing and developing regional connections with other existing non-commercial stations and building on connections with appropriate academic programs within the university.

Previous logo

In January 2009, the university announced that it was turning operation of the station over to Cincinnati Public Radio effective March 1, 2009. Seven people lost their jobs because of this change.

== See also ==
- Williams Hall (Miami University)
