= WHSS =

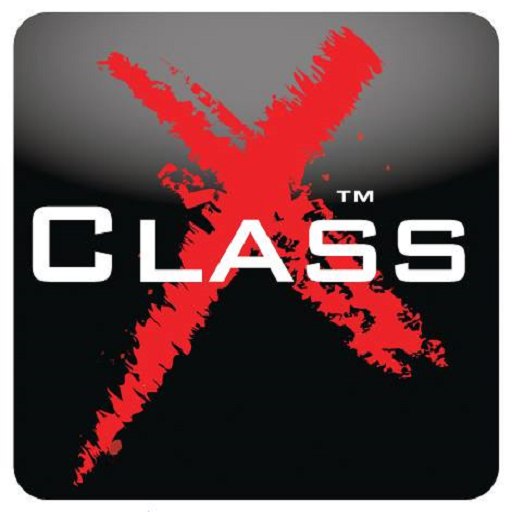
- Hamilton, Ohio; United States
- Broadcast area: Hamilton, Ohio
- Frequency: 89.5 MHz
- Branding: ClassX Radio

Programming
- Format: Classic rock

Ownership
- Owner: Spyrex Communications, Inc.
- Sister stations: WMWX

History
- First air date: May 1975
- Call sign meaning: Hamilton School System (former owner)

Technical information
- Licensing authority: FCC
- Facility ID: 25896
- Class: A
- ERP: 1,000 watts
- HAAT: 118 meters (387 ft)
- Transmitter coordinates: 39°25′48.00″N 84°37′43.00″W

Links
- Public license information: Public file; LMS
- Webcast: Listen live
- Website: classxradio.com

WHSS (89.5 FM) is a radio station in Hamilton, Ohio, United States, broadcasting with an effective radiated power of 190 watts. During the decades WHSS was owned and operated by the Hamilton City School District, it played an Alternative format. In 2010, under Sacred Heart Radio ownership, the station simulcasted religious talk programming from WNOP. In 2023, it was sold to Spyrex Communications, Inc. and began simulcasting classic rock-formatted WMWX.

== History ==
=== Hamilton High School ===
According to 89.5 WHSS station manager David Spurrier in July 2010, the vocational electronics class at Taft High School in Hamilton initiated the concept of starting a student operated high school radio station. Under the direction of the assistant vocational director and former electronics instructor, Mr. Todd Matthews, and with a ten thousand dollar grant for equipment from the Hamilton Community Foundation an application was filled with the Federal Communications Commission (FCC).

WHSS began broadcasting in May 1975 when the FCC granted an educational license to the Hamilton City School District. The station operated at a frequency of 89.5 MHz from an antenna height above average terrain of almost 300 feet at an effective radiated power of 10 watts. The station operated with studios located at Taft High School and a remote transmitter and antenna located about 5 miles away on Boyle Road in St. Clair Township northwest of Hamilton. Todd Matthews acted as the station's chief engineer until his retirement in the early 1990s. Robert Wilson was assistant chief engineer from 1976 until Matthews retirement and then served as chief engineer until his retirement in 2000.

It was decided that a radio class should be offered as an English elective. The first teacher and station manager was Ms. Leslie Laing. She only taught the class for one year. In 1976 the district combined the radio curriculum with television curriculum and create a vocational program called Broadcasting Arts. Walter Maude became the teacher of the junior Broadcasting Arts class and station manager of WHSS. Originally, the station, located at Taft High School but was staffed by students from Garfield, Badin as well as Taft High Schools. In 1978, the station upgraded its power to 190 watts. In February 1979, Walter Maude took over the senior television class from senior instructor Al Rierko and David Spurrier became the junior instructor and station manager of WHSS radio. He instructed all the Broadcasting Arts classes and station managed WHSS radio and Big Blue TV until his retirement July 1, 2010. In the fall of 1980, Taft and Garfield High Schools were consolidated into a single high school called Hamilton High School located in the former Taft building. Using its original facility, the station was also located at Hamilton High School.

Station operating hours have varied throughout the years but revolved around the school calendar. The station would sign on at the beginning of the school day around 7:30 a.m. ET and signed off at a variety of times from the end of the school day at 2:30 p.m. ET to 10:00 p.m. ET. The station only broadcast during the school year and was off air nights, weekends and holidays.

In 1997, the station was approached to timeshare its frequency during those hours WHSS wasn't on the air. If it kept the same hours WHSS would only broadcast 20% of the year and the timeshare partner would be on the air 80% of the year. Under those conditions WHSS would effectively be guest on its own frequency so the Hamilton City School Board of Education chose not to enter into the agreement. Since station management knew when license renewal came around WHSS might be forced by the FCC to timeshare the frequency, the decision was made to invest in an automation system and appropriate transmitter controls so the station could broadcast full-time. With the advice and engineering support of Broadcasting Arts alum and WLWT engineer John Sandor, in August 1998, WHSS began broadcasting 24 hours a day, 365 days a year.

In the fall of 2003, the Broadcasting Arts program along with WHSS and Big Blue TV moved to new facilities in the Job Development Center next to Hamilton High School. The move allowed the stations to purchase entirely new equipment from the control rooms to the transmitter. The current WHSS studios were designed and installed by Chuck McConnell of CME Technologies in Cincinnati.

Programming on WHSS originally was a mixture of classical and jazz music along with news and public affairs programs and play-by-play broadcasts of high school sports. In 1980 the music format was changed to an album-oriented rock format. It remained a mixture of pop and rock through the 1980s and 1990s. When the station debuted its 24-hour full-time broadcast it also introduced a rock/alternative music format. The station became known as 89.5 WHSS, The New Rock Alternative for southwestern Ohio. With the change in format and full-time broadcasts WHSS saw its listenership grow tremendously. The station was contacted by several nationally known periodicals to report its playlist on a weekly basis.

=== Sacred Heart Radio ===
Previous logo

Hamilton City Schools ended its live broadcasts at 4:00 PM on May 28, 2010, due to budget shortfalls and the discontinuation of the broadcasting arts program, as well as declining career opportunities in the broadcasting field. Station manager and broadcasting arts instructor David Spurrier will retire from his position after more than 31 years at WHSS. WHSS broadcast automatically until August 24, when the school district sold the station to Sacred Heart Radio, owner of WNOP.

=== ClassX Radio ===
Sacred Heart Radio sold WHSS to Spyrex Communications, Inc. and switched to classic rock as a simulcast of sister station WMWX.
