= WPTJ =

- Paris, Kentucky; United States
- Broadcast area: Lexington metropolitan area
- Frequency: 90.7 MHz
- Branding: King of Kings Radio

Programming
- Format: Christian radio
- Affiliations: King of Kings Radio

Ownership
- Owner: Somerset Educational Broadcasting Foundation

History
- First air date: August 2003
- Call sign meaning: Winning People To Jesus

Technical information
- Licensing authority: FCC
- Facility ID: 93789
- Class: C3
- ERP: 15,000 watts
- HAAT: 96 meters (315 ft)
- Transmitter coordinates: 38°19′40″N 84°7′44″W

Links
- Public license information: Public file; LMS
- Webcast: Listen live
- Website: kingofkingsradio.com

WPTJ (90.7 FM) is a non-commercial radio station licensed to Paris, Kentucky, United States, and serving the Lexington metropolitan area. The station is part of the King of Kings Radio Network, owned and operated by Somerset Educational Broadcasting Foundation and featuring a Christian format with southern gospel programs.

The transmitter site is off U.S. Route 68 in Millersburg.

== History ==
Station's former logo

The station began broadcasting in August 2003, and was owned by Lay Witness Broadcasting. In 2018, the station was sold to Somerset Educational Broadcasting Foundation for $240,000.
