= WNOP (AM) =

- Newport, Kentucky; United States
- Broadcast area: Greater Cincinnati, Covington
- Frequency: 740 kHz
- Branding: Sacred Heart Radio

Programming
- Language: English
- Format: Catholic talk/services
- Affiliations: EWTN Global Catholic Radio Network

Ownership
- Owner: Sacred Heart Radio Inc.
- Sister stations: WPFB

History
- First air date: August 21, 1948 (77 years ago)
- Call sign meaning: Newport

Technical information
- Licensing authority: FCC
- Facility ID: 15881
- Class: D
- Power: 2,500 watts day; 30 watts night
- Transmitter coordinates: 39°5′41.21″N 84°34′58.8″W
- Repeater: 910 WPFB (Middletown, Ohio)

Links
- Public license information: Public file; LMS
- Webcast: Listen live
- Website: sacredheartradio.com

WNOP (740 kHz) is an AM radio station located in Newport, Kentucky, that can be heard in and around the Cincinnati area. It now broadcasts for Cincinnati's Catholic community and archdiocesan base and is an affiliate of EWTN radio for most (if not all) of its programming.

WNOP was a jazz station for 38 years, except for a brief run as a CNN Headline News affiliate from 1992 to 1994. WNOP's current religious talk format started on December 31, 2000.

== History ==
=== Startup ===
The station was first on the air with combined country music and pre-recorded radio shows, receiving its Federal Communications Commission (FCC) license on May 29, 1947. The first broadcasts began on August 21, 1948. Jimmie Skinner hosted a radio program, which featured singer Connie Hall.

=== Jazz era (1962–2000) ===
Despite its relatively weak signal (not to mention almost bumping right into AM powerhouse WLW), WNOP had a core audience of loyal listeners during the years when its musical programming was mostly jazz. Its studios were on Monmouth St., in Newport, Kentucky where Ty Williams bravely played music during a studio fire. From there they moved to the "Jazz Ark' - floating studios on the Ohio river. It was not all jazz, however. Sometimes breaks between songs were filled with recordings of stand-up comedians. For the favorite comedy cuts the punch lines would be saved to a Gates ST-101 Spot Tape machine. They could be played as the DJ felt appropriate anytime between music tracks, or commercial voice-over.

From Monmouth St. the station moved to studios that were a tiny floating facility on the Ohio River, called "the jazz ark." Also known as "Free and Floating WNOP", the studios consisted of three 20,000-gallon fuel drums welded together with crosswalks and outfitted with all the necessary gear.

Unique for its time and place, the station maintained an on-air irreverence that could jolt you without warning. For instance, it sometimes identified itself as being "just a little to the right of WLW," while at other times, it claimed to be "Radio Free Newport," and Shelly Berman would often announce the call sign "WNOP - We're North Of Paraguay". On winter days when Cincinnati was hit with large amounts of snow and most stations announced school and workplace closings, morning on-air personality Leo Underhill instead would inform listeners which bars were closed due to bad weather.

=== Sacred Heart Radio (2000–present) ===
Sacred Heart Radio assumed ownership of the station on January 1, 2001. The program format was changed from jazz to Christian talk radio, much of it coming from EWTN Global Catholic Radio. The last song played before the switch was "The Vatican Rag" by Tom Lehrer.

The Son Rise Morning Show which airs weekday mornings on EWTN Radio originates from WNOP's studios, which are now located at Our Lady of the Holy Spirit Center (the former Mt. St. Mary's Seminary) at 5440 Moeller Avenue in Norwood.

On August 24, 2010, WHSS, 89.5 MHz in Hamilton, was sold by the Hamilton City Schools to Sacred Heart Radio. It was an FM repeater of WNOP reaching the northern Cincinnati region of Hamilton, Middletown, Mason and the surrounding area. The channel was sold to ClassX radio in 2023.

Logo while simulcasting with 89.5

In April 2016, Sacred Heart Radio Inc. purchased WPFB, 910 AM in Middletown from Northern Kentucky University to serve Middletown and the Dayton area. On June 3, 2016, WPFB commenced Sacred Heart Radio's programming.

=== On-air talent ===
==== Talent prior to 1962 (country music era) ====
- Bob Anderson, sportscaster
- Roy Moss
- Jimmie Skinner

==== On-air staff (1962–2000) ====
- Marc T. Bolin
- "Downtown" Scott Brown
- The Darksoldier (Phil Tucker)
- Jim Edwards
- Robyn Carey (Allgeyer)
- Angelo Catanzaro
- Jack Clements
- Val Coleman
- Dee Felice
- Kristi Heitzman
- Gary Keegan
- Wilbert Longmire
- Dennis "The Ironman" Michaels
- Bob NaveDa
- Geoff Nimmo
- Dick Pike
- Jim Planky
- Mike Roberts
- John Royer
- Brian Schwab
- Ray Scott
- Jean Shepherd
- Mark Stevens (Mark Schlachter)
- Bunky Tadwell (Walt Harrell)
- Oscar Treadwell
- Leo (Old Undies) Underhill
- Chris Wagner
- Max Warner
- Christopher Geisen
- Stew Williams
- Ty Williams
- Dave Worford
- Carmen "Catman" Catanzaro
- Candy McGinnis

• Scott McKay (Scott Marinoff) . Clint Powers (Clint Stortz)

==== On-air talent (after 2001) ====
- Brian Patrick
- Bill Levitt
- Anna Mitchell
- Matt Swaim
- Paul Lachmann
- Rev. Rob Jack
- Dr. Kenneth Craycraft
