= WITO =

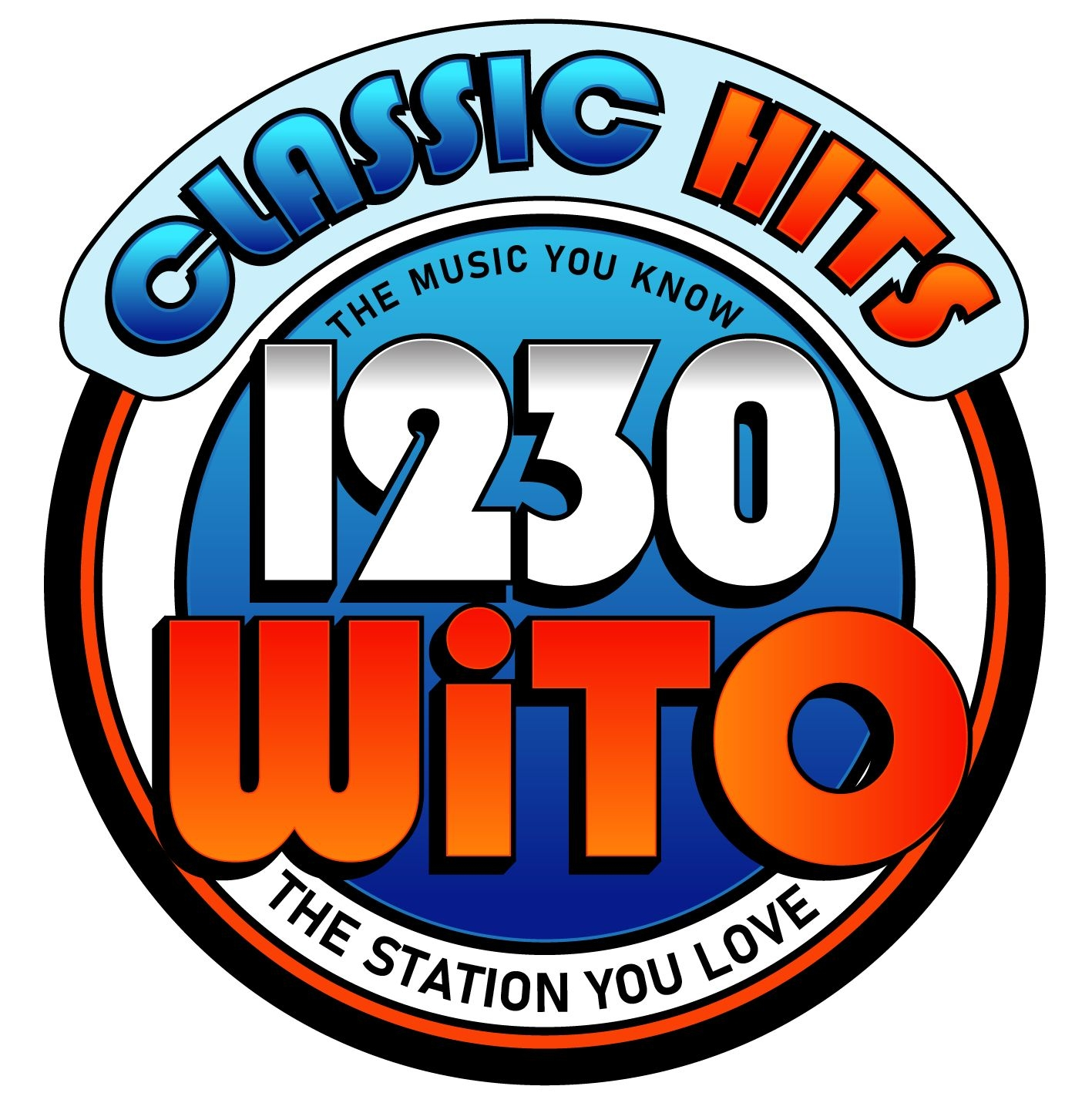
- Ironton, Ohio; United States
- Broadcast area: Ironton, Ohio; Ashland, Kentucky
- Frequency: 1230 kHz

Programming
- Format: Classic hits
- Affiliations: ABC News Radio, United Stations, Premiere Networks

Ownership
- Owner: KW Ministries, Inc. (operated by Fowler Media, LLC under an LMA)

History
- First air date: September 1951
- Former call signs: WIRO (1951–2022)

Technical information
- Licensing authority: FCC
- Facility ID: 61685
- Class: C
- Power: 1,000 watts (unlimited)
- Transmitter coordinates: 38°32′21″N 82°40′30″W

Links
- Public license information: Public file; LMS

WITO (1230 AM) is a commercial radio station serving the Ironton, Ohio, Flatwoods, Kentucky, and Ashland, Kentucky areas.

The station's antenna system uses a single tower that results in an omnidirectional signal pattern. According to the Antenna Structure Registration database, the tower is 62.4 m (205 ft) tall. The transmitter and broadcast tower are located near the intersection of U.S. Route 52 and Ohio State Route 93 in Ironton.

The station had the call letters WIRO from 1951 to 2022.

== History ==
WIRO was signed on in September 1951 by Iron City Broadcasting with C.A. Baker as president. The station was purchased in February 1962 by Tri-Radio Broadcasting. The station remained Adult Contemporary for majority of the ownership under Tri-Radio until it was sold in 1995 to Adventure Radio for $300,000. This was the first time not only did WIRO exit local ownership, it was separated from its FM sister station and vacated the Ironton studios and merged with the new co-owned radio stations in Huntington. Adventure Radio sold their Huntington West Virginia stations, which included WIRO to Commodore Media in 1997. Commodore would be sold to Atlantic Star in 1996 for $200 million. Chancellor Media, of which Atlantic Star was a subsidiary, became AMFM and was acquired by Clear Channel in a deal announced October 3, 1999, and valued at $17.4 billion.

In December 2021, iHeart donated WIRO to KW Ministries; the donation was consummated on February 28, 2022. It was also the last remaining station for the Aloha Station Trust that has been held since 2007.

The station ran a Christian worship and talk format branded as Expression Radio from KW Ministries through 2024. In 2024, KW Ministries entered into a Local Management Agreement with Fowler Media, LLC of Woodlawn, Tennessee. At that time, the station switched to a classic hits format and moved to a digital internet broadcast while temporarily going dark on the 1230 AM frequency. Over the air programming resumed on the 1230 AM frequency with the classic hits format on May 12, 2025.

== Programming ==
1230 WITO broadcasts a classic hits music format with local news, obituaries and weather as well as national news reports from ABC News. Programming includes the Sandman Serenade from 9pm-midnite, local morning and afternoon drive shows and syndicated shows including RetroMix and Totally Awesome 80's on the weekends.
