= WHBE (AM) =

Newburg, Kentucky; United States
- Broadcast area: Louisville metropolitan area
- Frequency: 680 kHz
- Branding: ESPN Louisville

Programming
- Format: Sports radio
- Affiliations: ESPN Radio; Cincinnati Reds Radio Network; Indianapolis Colts Radio Network; Louisville Cardinals; Louisville City FC; Racing Louisville FC; Westwood One

Ownership
- Owner: UB Louisville, LLC
- Sister stations: WHBE-FM; WLCL

History
- First air date: August 24, 1992
- Former call signs: WXKN (1992–1997); WNAI (1997–1999); WJIE (1999–2002); WDRD (2002–2011)

Technical information
- Licensing authority: FCC
- Facility ID: 56520
- Class: B
- Power: 1,000 watts (day); 450 watts (night)
- Transmitter coordinates: 38°5′31.2″N 85°40′55.9″W
- Repeater: 105.7 WHBE-FM (Eminence)

Links
- Public license information: Public file; LMS
- Webcast: Listen live
- Website: www.espnlouisville.com

WHBE (680 kHz) is an AM radio station broadcasting a sports radio format. Licensed to Newburg, Kentucky, United States, an unincorporated census-designated place (CDP) community in Jefferson County, that in 2003 merged alongside the rest of the county with Louisville, the station serves the Louisville area. The station is owned by UB Louisville, LLC and features programming from ESPN Radio.

== History ==
The station went on the air on August 24, 1992, as WXKN, with a news/talk format, largely consisting of CNN Headline News programming. The call sign were changed to WNAI in 1997. Word Broadcasting Network, owner of television station WBNA, acquired the station in 1999, and renamed it WJIE (sharing call letters with WJIE-FM, which is owned by a sister entity to Word Broadcasting Network). Three years later, the station was sold to The Walt Disney Company, who implemented its Radio Disney programming on March 16, 2002; on April 23, the call sign was changed to WDRD.

Disney put WDRD up for sale in late September 2010, and originally planned to temporarily shut the station down on September 30, 2010. However, the station instead switched to ESPN Radio on September 29, (itself owned by Disney), which had previously been heard on WQKC before it was shut down by Cumulus Media the preceding August, after a deal to sell the station to Chad Boeger was reached. Boeger acquired the station through UB Louisville, LLC; this entity shares several investors with Union Broadcasting, owner of Kansas City sports station WHB. The call sign was changed to the current WHBE on February 18, 2011.

Sister station WHBE-FM 105.7 in Eminence-Frankfort, Kentucky, which is audible in the Louisville area, was acquired from Davidson Media in April 2014. Most programs are simulcast with WHBE AM, but it previously also carried some ESPN Deportes Radio programming to appeal to the Hispanic audience (the FM station was formerly all-Spanish WTUV-FM).
