= WAKY =

WAKY may refer to:

- WAKY (AM), a radio station (620 AM) licensed to serve Louisville, Kentucky, United States
- WAKY-FM, a radio station (103.5 FM) licensed to serve Radcliff, Kentucky
