= Jarl Mohn =

American business executive

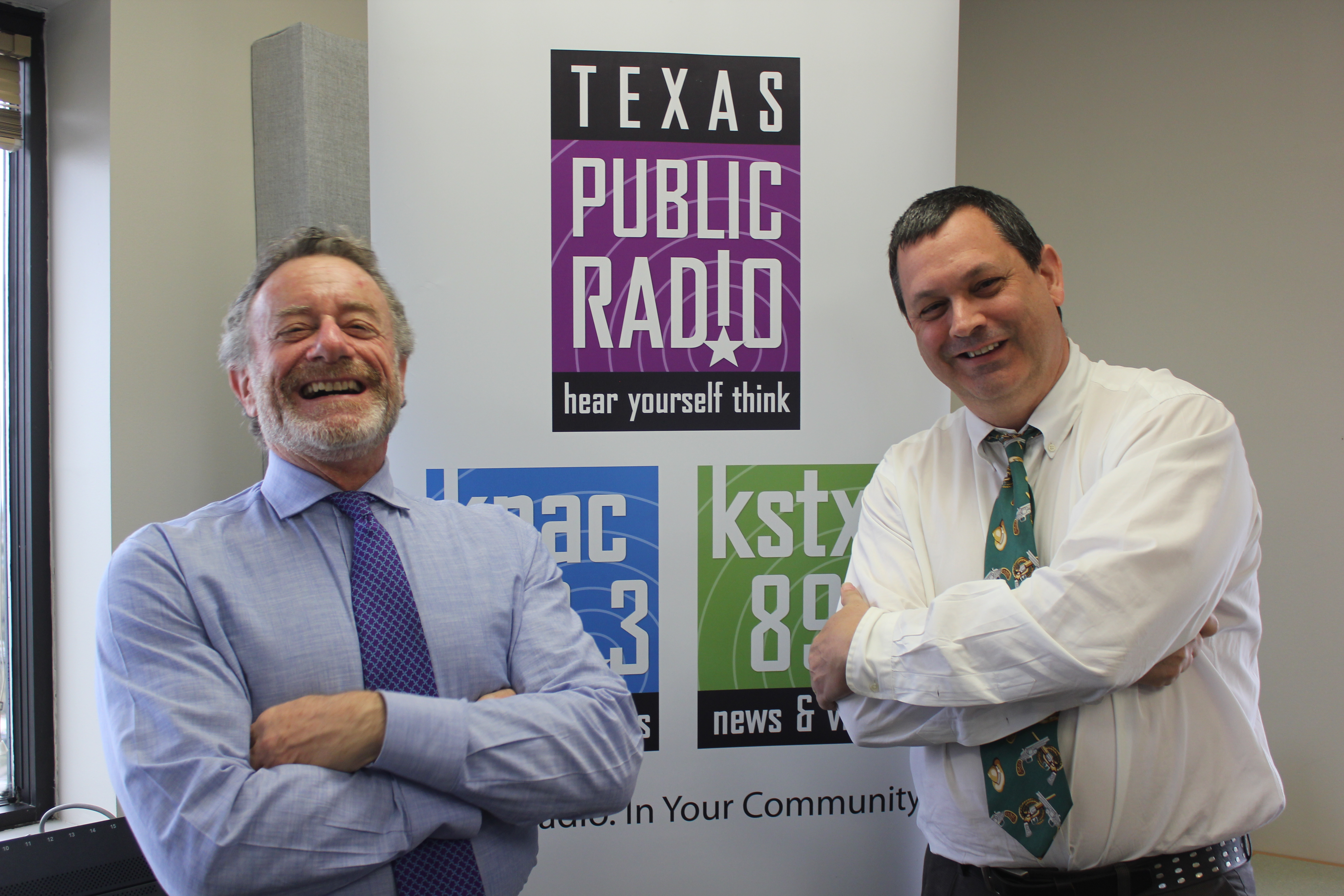
- Mohn (left) with David Martin Davies
- Born: Trenton, New Jersey
- Occupations: Venture capital investor, art collector, philanthropist
- Organization: NPR
- Spouse: Pamela (m. 1983)
- Children: 2

Jarl Mohn is an American venture capital investor, art collector, and philanthropist, who focuses primarily on startups in the Los Angeles area. He served as the president and CEO of NPR from 2014 to 2019 and now serves as its president emeritus.

== Education ==
Mohn was born in Trenton, New Jersey and raised in Doylestown, Pennsylvania. He studied Mathematics and Philosophy at Temple University.

== Early radio career ==
Mohn spent almost 20 years in radio, working mostly as a disc jockey under the name Lee Masters, including two years at WNBC in New York City. In the 1970s, Kentucky-based entrepreneur Clarance Henson hired Mohn to work as a programmer for WLRS in Louisville, and he later served as general manager of a group of radio stations owned by Henson Broadcasting: KLOZ and KISO in El Paso, TX, and WAVG in Louisville, Kentucky).

== Cable career ==
From 1986 until 1990 Mohn served as executive vice president and general manager at MTV and VH1. Mohn led the team that transitioned MTV from a 24-hour music-video service to a teen and young adult lifestyle channel, reversing a dramatic ratings decline and resulting in increases in audience and revenue.

He created E! Entertainment Television by transforming Movietime, a movie trailer service with 8 million subscribers, into a fully distributed, profitable enterprise worth over $1 billion covering all aspects of the entertainment industry. Mohn served as its president and CEO from 1990 to 1998. He was also founding president and CEO of Liberty Digital (1998-2001), a public company that invested in cable networks, the Internet and online businesses.

== Angel investor and board member ==
In the early 2000s, Mohn served on the board of trustees of Southern California Public Radio for more than a decade, including two years as chairman.

He has also been a corporate director and advisor to a number of media companies, making direct early-stage angel and seed investments in digital media/technology ventures. Mohn made over 60 early-stage venture investments, including in StubHub, App Annie, Red Car Wine, FreshPet, Oxygen Media, Bitium and Riot Games. He was a board member of the EW Scripps Company and Scripps Networks (HGTV, Food Network and Travel Channel) between 2002 and 2018 (until the sale to Discovery Networks). He also served as a director on the boards of XM Satellite Radio until it merged with Sirius in 2008, Comscore between 2008 and 2014, Riot Games until its sale to Tencent in 2011, and board chair of CNET until the sale to CBS in 2008. He spent 12 years on the board of The USC Annenberg School for Communication & Journalism, including six as its chair.

== NPR tenure ==
Mohn joined NPR as CEO on July 1, 2014, the seventh CEO in eight years. He came into an organization that had five years of net losses over the prior six years. Under his watch, NPR focused on rebuilding trust with member stations, investing in tentpole newsmagazines Morning Edition, All Things Considered and the burgeoning medium of podcasting. Reversing years of losses, the management team delivered five years in a row of record ratings, revenues and surpluses. In 2019 he stepped down becoming president emeritus, NPR Foundation board member and co-chair of NPR's 50th-anniversary capital campaign.

=== Sexual harassment controversy at NPR ===
During Mohn's time as CEO of NPR, the organization's senior vice president for news, Michael Oreskes, was accused of sexual harassment and inappropriate conduct by multiple women, including current NPR employees. Mohn received widespread criticism for his handling of sexual harassment complaints at the company.

Mohn had hired Oreskes for that position in 2015. The allegations were first reported on Oct. 31, 2017 by the Washington Post. Two women said that in the 1990s, when Oreskes worked for the New York Times, he made unwanted sexual advances during meetings about job opportunities. Oreskes resigned from NPR on Nov. 1, 2017 and said in a statement, "I am deeply sorry to the people I hurt. My behavior was wrong and inexcusable, and I accept full responsibility." More NPR employees subsequently reported inappropriate interactions with Oreskes.

Mohn was aware of at least some of the sexual misconduct allegations against Oreskes prior to the publication of the Washington Post story. At a staff meeting, the Washington Post later reported, "Mohn was pelted with angry comments about his failure to act in the face of multiple allegations that Oreskes had acted inappropriately toward women for years." On Nov. 7, 2017, Mohn wrote in an email to NPR's staff, "In retrospect, I did not see the bigger pattern of poor judgment and unacceptable behavior." He added, "I am sorry, and I have learned from this."

NPR and its board hired an outside law firm, Morgan Lewis, to conduct a review of the organization's handling of the harassment allegations against Oreskes. That report found staff had a high level of distrust for NPR management under Mohn's leadership. The Morgan Lewis investigation found that Mohn was aware of complaints regarding Oreskes in 2015, 2016, and 2017, but that his and NPR management's actions failed to correct Oreskes's behavior. Mohn pledged to make improvements following the release of the investigation.

The Columbia Journalism Review argued that Mohn's handling of the allegations showed that he was more concerned with the appearance of impropriety than the possible harm caused to employees. "NPR sullied its reputation in its very attempts to protect it," author Bill Grueskin wrote.

== Political activity ==
Mohn has contributed to the Democratic Senatorial Campaign Committee, Gephardt for president, Gore 2000, John Kerry for president, Obama Victory Fund 2012, the Progressive Patriots Fund, and Biden/Harris 2020.

== Charitable activities and foundations ==
Mohn was the chair of the ACLU Foundation of Southern California for 15 years.

He manages The Mohn Family Foundation, which supports philanthropic missions in Los Angeles for social justice, civil liberties (ACLU of Southern California), public radio (NPR, KPCC, KCRW, KPCW in Park City, Utah, and WNYC New York) and the arts (The Hammer Museum and Made In LA Biennial; LA County Museum of Art (Michael Heizer's Levitated Mass), MOCA, LAXART, ICA-LA, and The Getty’s Pacific Standard Time exhibit). Since 2002, Mohn also has been a trustee of The Mohn Family Trust, which is an early-stage investor in startups primarily in the Los Angeles area.

He and his wife fund the "Made in LA" exhibits and the Mohn Award for artistic excellence at The Hammer Museum.

== Personal life ==
Mohn and his wife Pamela Mohn married in 1983. They have two grown daughters.
