= WHBE =

WHBE may refer to:

- WHBE (AM), a radio station (680 AM) licensed to Newburg, Kentucky, United States
- WHBE-FM, a radio station (105.7 FM) licensed to Eminence, Kentucky, United States
- WEHN, a radio station (96.9 FM) licensed to East Hampton, New York, United States, which used the call sign WHBE from 2003 to 2006 while on 96.7
