= WQKC =

WQKC may refer to:

- WXVW, a radio station (1450 AM) licensed to serve Jeffersonville, Indiana, United States, which held the call sign WQKC from 2008 to 2013
- WLCL, a radio station (93.9 FM) licensed to serve Sellersburg, Indiana, which held the call sign WQKC from 1991 to 2008
