= WLGK =

WLGK may refer to:

- WLGK (FM), a radio station (94.7 FM) licensed to serve New Albany, Indiana, United States
- WFIA (AM), a radio station (900 AM) licensed to serve Louisville, Kentucky, United States, which held the call sign WLGK in 2023
- WAWS (FM), a radio station (107.3 FM) licensed to serve Claxton, Georgia, United States, which held the call sign WLGK from 2018 to 2019
