= WFIA =

WFIA may refer to:

- WFIA (AM), a radio station (900 AM) licensed to Louisville, Kentucky, United States
- WLGK (FM), a radio station (94.7 FM) licensed to New Albany, Indiana, United States, which held the call sign WFIA-FM from 2002 to 2023
- WRKA, a radio station (103.9 FM) licensed to Louisville, Kentucky, which held the call sign WFIA-FM from 1974 to 1979
