= WTUV =

WTUV may refer to:

- WAKY (AM), a radio station (620 AM) licensed to Louisville, Kentucky, United States, which used the call sign WTUV from 2006 to 2015
- WHBE-FM, a radio station (105.7 FM) licensed to Eminence, Kentucky, United States, which used the call sign WTUV-FM from 2006 to 2014
- WFXV, a television station (channel 27/PSIP 33) licensed to Utica, New York, United States, which used the call sign WTUV from 1986 to 1990
