= E. R. Bills =

American writer

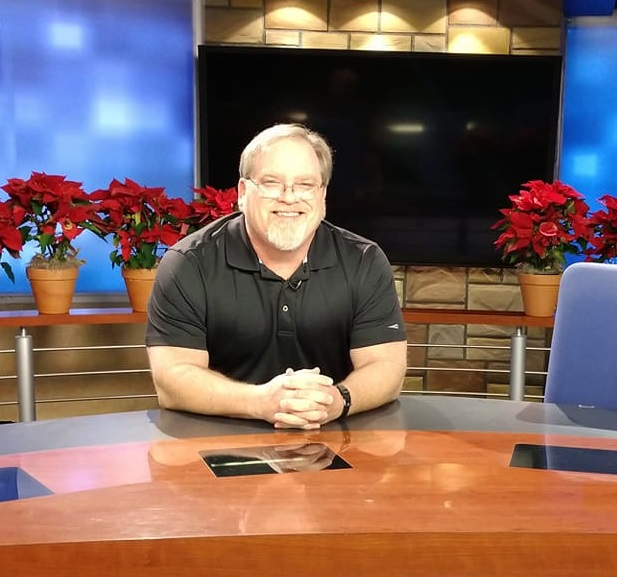
- Born: 1967 (age 58–59); Fort Worth, Texas, U.S.
- Education: Texas State University
- Occupations: Author; journalist

E. R. Bills (born 1967) is an American author and journalist.

== Life and career ==
Born in Fort Worth, Texas in 1967, Bills was raised in Aledo, Texas. His blue-collar parents stressed the importance of a college education and sent him to Europe with the American Institute of Foreign Study at the age of sixteen. Pursuing studies in art, literature and journalism at Texas State University, Bills garnered numerous state and regional awards for his work as the editor of the university magazine, Hillside Scene and also served as editor of university’s literary journal, Persona. In 1990, he was a member of Texas State’s national championship-winning team in the American Advertising Federation's annual National Student Advertising Competition and graduated from the Texas State University Honors College with a degree in journalism.

Bills pursued Master’s courses in American literature at Texas State and the University of Texas at Arlington, but never completed a graduate degree.

In 2006, Bills became a frequent contributor to Fort Worth Weekly and a columnist for the short-lived Paper of South Texas. By 2009, he was writing articles for Fort Worth Magazine and served as a community panel columnist for the Fort Worth Star-Telegram. Then, he began writing features for newspapers and magazines around the state, including the Austin American-Statesman and Texas Co-op Power magazine. In early 2013, a feature Bills penned on the 1910 Slocum Massacre (in East Texas) for the Austin American-Statesman caught the attention of The History Press and a commissioning editor subsequently approached him about writing a book. In late 2013, his first book, Texas Obscurities: Stories of the Peculiar, Exceptional and Nefarious was published by The History Press. In 2014, it was followed by his second title with The History Press, The 1910 Slocum Massacre: An Act of Genocide in East Texas. In 2015, Bills published Black Holocaust: The Paris Horror and a Legacy of Texas Terror with the Eakin Press. In 2016, Bills took a break from nonfiction and co-edited the Lone Star state’s first anthology of horror, Road Kill: Texas Horror by Texas Writers (Eakin Press), with fellow Texas author and former schlock filmmaker, Bret McCormick. Road Kill: Texas Horror by Texas Writers included works from Rio Grande Valley author David Bowles, filmmaker Glen Coburn (creator of the 1984 cult-classic film Bloodsuckers from Outer Space and legendary Texas author Joe R. Lansdale In August 2017, Eakin Press published Bills’ Texas Dissident: Dispatches from a Diminished State, 2006-2016, a collection of editorials and essays. In early October, the Eakin Press released Bills and McCormick’s Road Kill: Texas Horror by Texas Writers, Volume 2. In mid-October 2017, The History Press released Bills’ fifth book, Texas Far and Wide: The Tornado with Eyes, Gettysburg's Last Casualty, the Celestial Skipping Stone and Other Tales. In August 2018, Bills published 100 Things to Do in Texas Before You Die with the Reedy Press and was the sole editor of Road Kill: Texas Horror by Texas Writers, Volume 3 (HellBound Books). In October 2019, Bills published The San Marcos 10: An Antiwar Protest in Texas with The History Press and released his first book of fiction, Pendulum Grim, in December 2019. Over the last several years, Bills' historical research and writing has been repeatedly noted by the Zinn Education Project, and his titles have been cited in national publications like Smithsonian magazine and Mental Floss .

The August 2023 publication of Tell-Tale Texas: Investigations in Infamous History (The History Press) cemented Bills' reputation as one of the foremost critics of white fragility and selective amnesia in the Lone Star State. And he still continues to investigate and research controversial Texas history and author books, articles and editorials that challenge and inspire readers. Bills' nonfiction papers and research are now part of the "E. R. Bills Collection" at Texas Christian University in Fort Worth.

On October 4, 2024, Fawkes Press released The Halloween in Me, a definitive collection of Bills' horror novellas (and some short stories). Kirkus Reviews said "Bills displays an innate sense for the reader’s experience" and called it "a fun, imaginative story collection with solid horror and writing."

=== Slocum massacre ===
After the publication of Bills’ The 1910 Slocum Massacre: An Act of Genocide in East Texas in May 2014, Bills and Constance Hollie-Jawaid, a descendant of victims of the Slocum massacre, worked together on a historical marker application commemorating the atrocity. Hollie-Jawaid submitted it to the Anderson County Historical Commission and members there were immediately hostile. Commission officials criticized Hollie-Jawaid’s application, variously claiming it was unprofessional, based on rumors, antagonistic and, finally, too focused on negative history rather than positive. Hollie-Jawaid subsequently petitioned the Texas State Historical Commission directly and, on January 29, 2015, the Commission unanimously approved the Slocum Massacre historical marker application with a score of 98 on a 100-point scale. When it was placed and dedicated on January 16, 2016, it became the first state of Texas historical marker to specifically acknowledge racial violence against African Americans. In 2016, Bills and Hollie-Jawaid completed The First Eight, a screenplay based on the Slocum Massacre. In late 2017, Bills book, The 1910 Slocum Massacre: An Act of Genocide in East Texas, was optioned for film treatment. In early 2018, Bills and Hollie-Jawaid wrote Shallow Playground, a second screenplay related to the Slocum Massacre and it, too, was optioned for film treatment. Bills and Hollie-Jawaid continue to work on locating and gaining access to the unmarked mass graves that still contain the remains of victims of the Slocum Massacre. In the October 2019 Texas Monthly cover story, "The Battle to Rewrite Texas History," Bills was mentioned as part of "a new generation of scholars" who are attempting to correct the "historical record" in the Lone Star state.

=== Lynching of Bragg Williams ===
In early 2022, relatives of Bragg Williams, an intellectually disabled Black man burned at the stake in Hillsboro, Texas, in 1919, contacted Bills and asked for his help in getting a historical marker to acknowledge this atrocity. Working with the family, Bills wrote the historical marker application and the chief spokesperson of the family, Crady Johnson, was the official sponsor. The Bragg Williams historical marker application was approved in August 2022. The Bragg Williams Lynching Historical Marker was dedicated on January 20, 2025—MLK Day and the 106th anniversary of his horrific, extrajudicial execution.

=== Assassination of Frank J. Robinson ===
In mid 2022, Bills joined Texas Public Radio reporter David Martin Davies in an investigation into the murder of east Texas civil rights leader Frank J. Robinson. He wrote about it for the Fort Worth Weekly. https://www.fwweekly.com/2022/09/21/the-fjr-assassination/

== Bibliography ==
=== Nonfiction ===
- Letters from Texas, 2021-2023. Fort Worth, Texas: Starkweather Press, 2024.
- Tell-Tale Texas: Investigations into Infamous History. Charleston, SC: The History Press, 2023.
- 100 Things to Do in Texas Before You Die, 2nd Edition. Saint Louis, Missouri: Reedy Press, 2022.
- Fear and Loathing in the Lone Star State. IngramSpark, August 2021.
- Texas Oblivion: Mysterious Disappearances, Escapes and Cover-ups. Charleston, SC: The History Press, 2021.
- The San Marcos 10: An Antiwar Protest in Texas. Charleston, SC: The History Press, 2019.
- 100 Things to Do in Texas Before You Die. Saint Louis, Missouri: Reedy Press, 2018.
- Texas Far and Wide: The Tornado with Eyes, Gettysburg's Last Casualty, the Celestial Skipping Stone and Other Tales. Charleston, SC: The History Press, 2017.
- Texas Dissident: Dispatches from a Diminished State, 2006-2016. Fort Worth, Texas: Eakin Press, 2017.
- Black Holocaust: The Paris Horror and a Legacy of Texas Terror. Fort Worth, Texas: Eakin Press, 2015.
- The 1910 Slocum Massacre: An Act of Genocide in East Texas. Charleston, SC: The History Press, 2014.
- Texas Obscurities: Stories of the Peculiar, Exceptional and Nefarious. Charleston, SC: The History Press, 2013.

=== Fiction ===
- The Halloween in Me. Fort Worth, Texas: Fawkes Press, 2024.
- Nature Calls (novella). River Oaks, Texas: Starkweather Imprints, 2023.
- Pendulum Grim. IngramSpark, 2019

As Executive Editor

- Road Kill: Texas Horror by Texas Writers, Vol. 9. Houston, Texas: HellBound Books, 2024.
- Road Kill: Texas Horror by Texas Writers, Vol 8. Houston, Texas: HellBound Books, 2023.
- Road Kill: Texas Horror by Texas Writers, Vol 7. Houston, Texas: HellBound Books, 2022.
- Road Kill: Texas Horror by Texas Writers, Vol 6. Houston, Texas: HellBound Books, 2021.

As Editor:

- Road Kill: Texas Horror by Texas Writers, Vol 5. Houston, Texas: HellBound Books, 2020.
- Road Kill: Texas Horror by Texas Writers, Vol 3. Houston, Texas: HellBound Books, 2018.
- Road Kill: Texas Horror by Texas Writers, Vol 2. Fort Worth, Texas: Eakin Press, 2017.
- Road Kill: Texas Horror by Texas Writers. Fort Worth, Texas: Eakin Press, 2016.

== Further information ==
- It Happened Today . . . In Texas (2025). "Burned at the Stake: The Lynching of Bragg Williams." https://todayintx.com/2025/01/20/burned-at-the-stake-the-lynching-of-bragg-williams/
- Kirkus Reviews (2024). "The Halloween in Me." https://www.kirkusreviews.com/book-reviews/e-r-bills/the-halloween-in-me/
- Chelsea Ennen (2024). Kirkus Reviews, "The Past Haunts the Present In E.R. Bills’ Novella." https://www.kirkusreviews.com/news-and-features/articles/the-past-haunts-the-present-in-er-bills-novella/
- Jay Cody Key (2024). Texas Books in Review, "Absent but Not Forgotten Texas History." https://www.tbr.txst.edu/archives/spring-2024/tell-tale-texas.html
- Hollie Rae Garcia (2023). Fort Worth Weekly, "Diverse, Death." https://www.fwweekly.com/2024/01/03/diverse-death/
- Kirkus Reviews (2023). "Nature Calls." https://www.kirkusreviews.com/book-reviews/er-bills/nature-calls/
- Kirkus Reviews (2023). "Tell-Tale Texas: Investigations into Historic Infamy." https://www.kirkusreviews.com/book-reviews/er-bills/tell-tale-texas-investigations-in-infamous-history/
- Jef Rouner (2023). "Galveston celebrates Edgar Allan Poe, Chopin with first TxPoe Expo" Houston Chronicle. https://preview.houstonchronicle.com/families/texas-edgar-allan-poe-17719988
- Christian McPhate (2022). "North Texas Book Festival kicks off this weekend at the Greater Denton Arts Council." Denton-Record Chronicle. https://dentonrc.com/news/north-texas-book-festival-kicks-off-this-weekend-at-the-greater-denton-arts-council/
- Berit Mason, (2022). "Boerne book festival kicks off spooky season with monsters and mysteries." San Antonio Report. https://sanantonioreport.org/boerne-book-and-arts-festival-2022/
- Madison Simmons (2022). "Correcting Texas History." Fort Worth Weekly. https://www.fwweekly.com/2022/07/06/correcting-texas-history/
- Aaron Hand (2021). "A Voice for the Forgotten." Texas Books in Review. https://www.tbr.txst.edu/archives/fall-2021/texas-oblivion.html
- JJ Maldonado (2021). "111 Years Later: The Slocum Massacre." CBS19 Tyler, July 29, 2021. https://www.cbs19.tv/article/news/special-reports/the-slocum-massacre-111-years-later/501-eea66964-5b27-443a-8386-26e1649ac2a9
- Amy French (2021). "Descendant of massacre answers call of her ancestors." Palestine Herald Press, July 29, 2021. https://www.palestineherald.com/news/descendant-of-massacre-answers-call-of-her-ancestors/article_6a40f920-efe5-11eb-b3e5-2792e2879fa9.html
- Tom Hanks (2021). "You Should Learn the Truth About the Tulsa Race Massacre." The New York Times, June 4, 2021. https://www.nytimes.com/2021/06/04/opinion/tom-hanks-tulsa-race-massacre-history.html
- Kali Holloway (2021). "‘The United States of Lyncherdom’ Didn’t End With Tulsa." The Daily Beast, June 3, 2021. https://www.thedailybeast.com/the-united-states-of-lyncherdom-didnt-end-with-tulsas-black-wall-street
- Emily McCullar (2021). "How to Scare Yourself Like a Texan." Texas Monthly, October 30, 2020. https://www.texasmonthly.com/the-culture/how-to-scare-yourself-like-texan/
- Anna L. Davis (2021). "Road Killing It." Fort Worth Weekly, January 13, 2021. https://www.fwweekly.com/2021/01/13/road-killing-it/
- Elaine Ayala (2020). "Ayala: In San Antonio and everywhere, ‘All Lives Matter’ has been an empty retort to ‘Black Lives Matter,’ because all lives matter has never been true." San Antonio Express-News, June 9, 2020. https://www.expressnews.com/news/news_columnists/elaine_ayala/article/Ayala-In-San-Antonio-and-everywhere-All-15325952.php
- Shaula Schneik Edwards (2020). "Everything's Scarier in Texas." Texas Books in Review, Spring 2020. https://www.tbr.txstate.edu/archives/spring-2020/road-kill.html
- Bret McCormick (2020). "Pendulum Grim book review." Hellnotes, January 31, 2020. http://hellnotes.com/book-review-pendulum-grim/
- Karen Gavis (2020). "Hellraisin’: Two Writers Edit and Publish a Yearly Anthology of Texas Horror Stories." Dallas Observer, January 31, 2020. https://www.dallasobserver.com/arts/boo-yall-two-authors-collects-texas-horror-tales-11859084
- Laura Figi (2019). "San Marcos 10 revisit Texas State for 50-year protest anniversary." University Star, November 19, 2019. https://universitystar.com/33040/life_and_arts/san-marcos-10-revisit-texas-state-for-50-year-protest-anniversary/
- Rachel Sonnier (2019). "50 Year Anniversary." San Marcos Daily Record, November 17, 2019. https://www.sanmarcosrecord.com/features/san-marcos-10
- David Martin Davies (2019). "San Marcos Students' Protest Against Vietnam War Shaped Free Speech On Campuses For 50 Years." Texas Public Radio. November 13, 2019. https://www.keranews.org/post/san-marcos-students-protest-against-vietnam-war-shaped-free-speech-campuses-50-years
- Alvin Sallee (2019). "'San Marcos 10' explores many experiences during Vietnam War." The Daily News (Galveston County), November 9, 2019. https://www.galvnews.com/books/article_a9effb9a-9512-5aea-96dc-98c906583042.html
- Christopher Hooks (2019). “The Battle to Rewrite Texas History.” Texas Monthly, October 2019. https://www.texasmonthly.com/articles/battle-rewrite-texas-history/
- Book Authority (2019). "25 Best Texas Travel Guide Books of All Time." https://bookauthority.org/books/best-texas-travel-guide-books
- Joe Holley (2019). "Did Aaron Burr’s ‘dear Theodosia’ walk the plank or meet her maker in Texas?" Houston Chronicle, July 13, 2019. https://www.houstonchronicle.com/news/columnists/native-texan/article/Did-Aaron-Burr-s-dear-Theodosia-walk-the-14091198.php
- Michael Barajas (2019). “Where the Bodies Are Buried. Texas Observer, July 2019. https://www.texasobserver.org/where-the-bodies-are-buried/
- Matthew D. Berkshier (2019). "Porvenir: The Quiet Massacre." https://news.sulross.edu/blog/2019/04/12/porvenir-the-quiet-massacre/
- Cedar Hollow Horror Reviews (2018). https://www.cedarhollowhorrorreviews.com/2018/12/road-kill-texas-horror-by-texas-writers.html
- Glen Dromgoole (2018). “Texas Reads: Author explores women’s roles in Texas history.” Abilene Reporter News, November 15, 2018. https://www.reporternews.com/story/life/columnists/glenn-dromgoole/2018/11/15/texas-reads-author-explores-womens-roles-texas-history/1936075002/
- Acacia Coronado (2018). “From Isolated Beaches To Great Tex-Mex, Get To Know 100 Things To Do In Texas Before You Die.” Texas Standard, November 19, 2018. https://www.texasstandard.org/stories/from-isolated-beaches-to-great-tex-mex-get-to-know-100-things-to-do-in-texas-before-you-die/
- Coshandra Dillard (2017). “An armed white mob in Texas massacred their black neighbors in 1910, and none of them were prosecuted.” Timeline, October 5, 2017. https://timeline.com/slocum-massacre-texas-mob-4a212c1e63e7
- Abner Fletcher (2017). “Road Kill: Texas Horror By Texas Writers.” Houston Public Media (Houston Matters), February 1, 2017. https://www.houstonpublicmedia.org/articles/arts-culture/literature/2017/02/01/218179/road-kill-texas-horror-by-texas-writers/
- CCCT (2016). ”'Obscurities' tells weird and wonderful Texas tales.” Corpus Christi Caller-Times, November 27, 2016. http://www.caller.com/story/life/2016/11/27/obscurities-tells-weird-and-wonderful-texas-tales/94355952/
- David Martin Davies (2016). “Texas Horror.” Texas Public Radio (Texas Matters), October 28, 2016. http://tpr.org/post/texas-matters-texas-horror#stream/0
- Laura Rice (2016). “Looking for a Lone Star Scare? This Books Got You Covered.” Texas Standard, October 31, 2016. http://www.texasstandard.org/stories/categories/film/looking-for-a-lone-star-scare-this-books-got-you-covered/
- Tayla Andre (2016) "The 1910 Slocum Massacre: An Act of Genocide in East Texas - Historic Marker with E.R. Bills." Wake Up with Tayla Andre. https://www.mixcloud.com/WakeUpwithTaylaAndre/the-1910-slocum-massacre-an-act-of-genocide-in-east-texas-historic-marker-with-er-bills/
- Julianne Malveaux (2016). "Standing on Sacred Ground." Washington Informer, February 4, 2016. https://www.washingtoninformer.com/standing-on-sacred-ground/
- Sean Braswell (2016). “Staging A Texas-Size Train Disaster for Fun and Profit.” Ozy, February 3, 2016. http://www.ozy.com/flashback/staging-a-texas-size-train-disaster-for-fun-and-profit/65401
- Doyin Oyeniyi (2016). “Remembering the Slocum Massacre.” Texas Monthly, February 1, 2016. https://www.texasmonthly.com/the-daily-post/remembering-the-slocum-massacre/
- Michael Barajas (2016). “It Took Texas a Century to Remember African Americans Slaughtered at Slocum.” Houston Press, January 18, 2016. http://www.houstonpress.com/news/it-took-texas-a-century-to-remember-african-americans-slaughtered-at-slocum-8080376
- Jennifer Sheridan (2016). “Slocum Massacre marker unveiled.” Palestine Herald-Press, January 17, 2016. http://www.palestineherald.com/news/slocum-massacre-marker-unveiled/article_540ed642-bc9f-11e5-be35-9bf8affa3502.html
- Tim Madigan (2016). “Texas marks racial slaughter more than a century later.” The Washington Post, January 16, 2016. https://www.washingtonpost.com/national/texas-marks-a-racial-slaughter-over-a-100-years-later/2016/01/15/fb194dd0-ba4e-11e5-99f3-184bc379b12d_story.html
- David Martin Davies (2016). “Slocum Massacre Highlights Historical Double Standard In The South,” NPR (All Things Considered), January 15, 2016. http://www.npr.org/2016/01/15/463224198/slocum-massacre-highlights-historical-double-standard-in-the-south
- Marc Ramirez (2016). “Sign Shines Light and Truth on Slocum’s Grim Past.” Dallas Morning News, January 14, 2016. https://www.dallasnews.com/news/news/2016/01/14/sign-shines-light-and-truth-on-slocums-grim-past
- Glenn Dromgoole (2016). “‘Black Holocaust’ tells a tale of homegrown Texas terrorism.” Abilene Reporter-News, January 9, 2016. http://archive.reporternews.com/lifestyle/columnists/glenn-dromgoole/author-documents-black-holocaust-in-texas-2820957c-d06c-2e34-e053-0100007f33fc-364306711.html
- David Martin Davies (2015). “Author Explores Texas History Of Fiery Lynchings.” Texas Public Radio, September 11, 2015. http://tpr.org/post/author-explores-texas-history-fiery-lynchings
- L. Arthalia Cravin (2015). “New Book Review: Black Holocaust: The Paris Horror and a Legacy of Texas Terror.” North Amarillo Now, September 5, 2015. http://northamarillonow.co/wp2/?p=23206
- JBHE (2015). “Recent Books That May Be of Interest to African American Scholars.” The Journal of Blacks in Higher Education, September 2, 2015. https://www.jbhe.com/2015/09/recent-books-that-may-be-of-interest-to-african-american-scholars-202/
- Edward Brown (2015). “Hiding History.” Fort Worth Weekly, February 18, 2015. https://www.fwweekly.com/2015/02/18/hiding-history/
- Dana Goolsby (2015). “Texas State Historical Commission approves Slocum Massacre historical marker.” Your East Texas, January 30, 2015. https://youreasttexas.com/news/texas-state-historical-commission-approves-slocum-massacre-historical-marker
- Jonathan Tilove (2015). “Slocum Massacre’s 'bad history’ gains Texas historical marker.” Austin American-Statesman, January 29, 2015. http://www.mystatesman.com/news/state--regional-govt--politics/slocum-massacre-bad-history-gains-texas-historical-marker/tQBPlrGrsPvgDKOFGY2fwI/
- Nate Smith (2015). “Slocum Massacre marker stirs controversy.” Weatherford Democrat, January 28, 2015. http://www.weatherforddemocrat.com/news/slocum-massacre-marker-stirs-controversy/article_fbd99a12-a74a-11e4-82af-f7c9490cccc7.html
- David Martin Davies (2015). “Should Texas Remember Or Forget The Slocum Massacre?” Texas Public Radio, January 16, 2015. http://tpr.org/post/should-texas-remember-or-forget-slocum-massacre
- Jonathan Tilove (2014). “How should East Texas Massacre Be Remembered.” Austin American-Statesman, December 27, 2014. http://www.mystatesman.com/news/state--regional/how-should-1910-east-texas-massacre-remembered/5Ktrk9UD1MVUQJcTZTyWnK/
- Coshandra Dillard (2014). “1910 East Texas massacre at Slocum a story that 'needed to be told.'” Tyler Morning Telegraph, October 21, 2014. http://www.tylerpaper.com/TP-News+Local/207242/1910-east-texas-massacre-at-slocum-a-story-that-needed-to-be-told
