= WAKY (AM) =

Radio station in Louisville, Kentucky

Simulcast with WAKY-FM, Radcliff
- Louisville, Kentucky; United States
- Broadcast area: Louisville metropolitan area
- Frequency: 620 kHz
- Branding: 103.5 WAKY

Programming
- Format: Oldies
- Affiliations: Fox News Radio; Kentucky Wildcats

Ownership
- Owner: Wakyana LLC
- Sister stations: WAKY-FM

History
- First air date: August 10, 1958 (as WTMT)
- Former call signs: WTMT (1958–2006); WTUV (2006–2015)

Technical information
- Licensing authority: FCC
- Facility ID: 30798
- Class: B
- Power: 500 watts
- Transmitter coordinates: 38°18′59.9″N 85°42′2.6″W
- Translators: 100.1 W261CO (Louisville); 104.9 W285ER (Prospect); 106.3 W292FS (Louisville)

Links
- Public license information: Public file; LMS
- Webcast: Listen live
- Website: wakyradio.com

WAKY (620 kHz) is a commercial AM radio station in Louisville, Kentucky, that simulcasts an oldies format with WAKY-FM 103.5. It is owned by Wakyana LLC. WAKY-AM-FM carry University of Kentucky Wildcats football and basketball. The studios are on Ring Road in Elizabethtown.

WAKY is a Class B station powered at 500 watts. To protect other stations on 620 AM from interference, it has a directional antenna, using a three-tower array by day and a five-tower array at night. The transmitter towers are along Lutz Lane in the Oak Park neighborhood of Jeffersonville, Indiana. In addition to 103.5 FM and 620 AM, programming is also heard on three FM translators: 100.1 W261CO in Louisville, 104.3 W285ER in Prospect and 106.3 W292FS, also in Louisville.

== History ==
AM 620 signed on the air on August 10, 1958. Its original call sign was WTMT and it was owned by Jefferson Broadcasting. In its early years, it was an affiliate of ABC Radio and the Mutual Broadcasting System. For much of the 1960s, 1970s and 1980s, WTMT aired a country music format. In the 1990s, as radio listeners moved to the FM dial to hear music, WTMT flipped to a sports radio format.

In 2005, 620 AM switched its call letters to WTUV. It shared a significant portion of Spanish-language programming with sister station WTUV-FM 105.7. In 2014, Davidson Media sold the WTUV stations: WTUV-FM went to UB Louisville and became English-language sports radio station WHBE-FM, while WTUV AM was taken over by W&B Broadcasting, owner of WAKY-FM and WLVK, in a $325,000 deal.

AM 620 was assigned the WAKY call letters by the Federal Communications Commission on April 1, 2015. On May 3, 2015, it became a simulcast of WAKY-FM, rebroadcasting its classic hits format. The WAKY call letters are evocative of WAKY (790 AM), a nationally influential Top 40 music station in Louisville under several owners, including Gordon McLendon, Multimedia and LIN Broadcasting. The Top 40 hits played on the old WAKY from 1958 to late 1985.

Currently, the WAKY-AM-FM studios are south of the Fort Knox Army Reservation in Radcliff, Kentucky, about 27 miles (43 km) south of Louisville. The WAKY AM transmitter and antenna are located in the Oak Park area of Jeffersonville, Indiana.

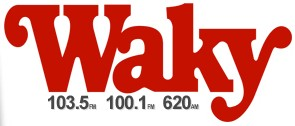
Logo before 104.9 and 106.3 translator sign ons

W&B Broadcasting sold the WAKY stations to Wakyana LLC, a group led by Randy Michaels, for $1.3 million in 2025.

== Translators ==
WAKY-AM-FM programming is also heard on three FM translators:

- 100.1 W261CO serves Louisville inside the Interstate 264 (Watterson/Shawnee Expressway) corridor (along with New Albany, Clarksville, and Jeffersonville in Southern Indiana.
- 104.3 W285ER serves Prospect, Kentucky and Charlestown, Indiana.
- 106.3 W292FS serves Jeffersontown and Lake Forest.
