= WGTK (AM) =

Radio station in Louisville, Kentucky

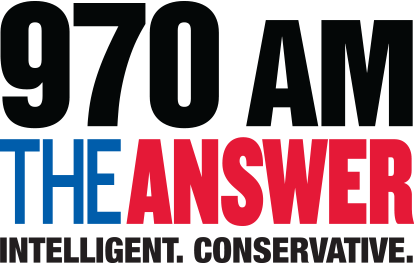
- Louisville, Kentucky; United States
- Broadcast area: Louisville metropolitan area
- Frequency: 970 kHz
- Branding: 970 The Answer

Programming
- Format: Conservative talk
- Affiliations: Townhall Radio News; Salem Radio Network; Westwood One; University of Louisville Cardinals

Ownership
- Owner: Word Media Group; (Word Broadcasting Network, Inc.)
- Sister stations: WBNA; WBNM-LD; WFIA; WJIE-FM; WLGK; WXVW

History
- First air date: February 11, 1927 (Note: Moved to Louisville on December 30, 1933.)
- Former call signs: WFIW (1927–1933); WAVE (1933–1981); WAVG (1981–1997); WLKY (1997–2000)
- Former frequencies: 820 kHz (1927); 830 kHz (1927); 1150 kHz (1927–1928); 940 kHz (1928–1941)
- Call sign meaning: "Talk"

Technical information
- Licensing authority: FCC
- Facility ID: 63936
- Class: B
- Power: 5,000 watts
- Transmitter coordinates: 38°19′5″N 85°44′39″W
- Translator: 93.5 W228EO (Louisville)

Links
- Public license information: Public file; LMS
- Webcast: Listen live
- Website: wgtktheanswer.com

WGTK (970 AM) is a commercial radio station licensed to Louisville, Kentucky, United States. It is owned by the Word Media Group and airs a conservative talk format, calling itself "970 The Answer". Its studios are on Corporate Campus Drive in Louisville.

The transmitter is on Hamburg Pike in Jeffersonville, Indiana. Programming is also heard on 50-watt FM translator W228EO at 93.5 MHz in Louisville.

== History ==
=== The Hopkinsville years ===
The station signed on the air on February 11, 1927, as WFIW, licensed to Hopkinsville, Kentucky. Test broadcasts had been conducted three nights earlier. WFIW was owned by Acme Flour Mills, Incorporated of Hopkinsville with the call letters standing for the "Whitest Flour In the World."

It was a 500-watt station that originally broadcast at 820 kilohertz for the station's first three months until moving to 830 kilohertz. The station's broadcasting equipment at that time was sold by the operators of the defunct WIAR, which operated in Paducah from 1922 until 1924. In the latter half of 1927, it moved again to 1150 kilohertz with 1,000 watts of power. A newspaper article published the same year cited the station for its gold and black motif, which earned the station's facility's nickname, the "Golden Studio".

In the latter half of 1928, as part of a nationwide reorganization of radio frequencies, the station's third frequency change occurred, moving to 940 kilohertz. WFIW became an affiliate of the CBS Radio Network the following year. On July 29, 1931, the WFIW studios were destroyed by a fire, thus silencing the station until new facilities could built; it would occupy that studio for about two years.

=== Early years in Louisville ===
On October 25, 1933, WFIW was purchased by George Norton Jr. The station's transmitter was moved to Louisville, with the call letters being changed to WAVE. The station retained the AM 940 frequency it previously broadcast on. It returned to the air on December 30, 1933, and was now affiliated with the NBC Red Network. It carried NBC's schedule of dramas, comedies, news, sports, soap operas, game shows and big band broadcasts during the "Golden Age of Radio".

During the Ohio River flood in January 1937, WAVE suspended regular programming to provide extensive coverage of the flood, and to provide emergency information.

After more than six years transmitting drom the Brown Hotel building, the station's transmitter site was relocated to Jeffersonville, Indiana, in November 1940. After the North American Regional Broadcasting Agreement (NARBA) took effect in 1941, WAVE switched frequencies to 970 kHz.

In 1948, it added the first TV station in Kentucky, WAVE-TV. Because WAVE radio had been a long-time NBC Radio affiliate, WAVE-TV primarily carried NBC programs.

=== Middle-of-the-road format ===
As network programming shifted from radio to TV during the 1950s, WAVE began airing a full-service middle of the road format, which later shifted to oldies. In 1981, WAVE was sold to locally based Henson Broadcasting. Because the TV station kept the WAVE call sign, the AM station changed call letters to WAVG; this was necessitated by Federal Communications Commission rules at the time, since repealed. Seven years later, the station was purchased by Radio One (unrelated to the company now known as Urban One that eventually bought stations in the Louisville market in the late 1990s).

=== Oldies format ===
In the fall of 1989, the station dropped local programming and began running a satellite-fed syndicated oldies format. On September 4, 1990, WAVG switched to an adult standards format. In 1991, WAVG was sold to Sunnyside Communications.

=== Pulitzer ownership and all-news format ===
On January 8, 1997, Sunnyside announced it would sell WAVG to Pulitzer, then-owners of CBS affiliate WLKY-TV (channel 32), which announced plans to flip the station to an all-news format, with AP News Radio programming and simulcasts of WLKY's television newscasts. The changeover took place at noon on June 16. At the same time, the WAVG call letters and standards format moved to 1450 AM, while 970 adopted the WLKY call sign.

=== Salem Communications ownership ===
In August 2000, Hearst-Argyle (which bought all of Pulitzer's broadcasting outlets the year before) sold the radio station to Salem Communications. Salem flipped it to a talk radio format as WGTK. In the 1990s, the WGTK call letters belonged to a classic rock station in Middlebury, Vermont (now WWFY in Berlin). When Salem acquired an FM station in the Greenville–Spartanburg, South Carolina radio market, it used the same call letters, with that station known as WGTK-FM from February 2013 until Salem sold it effective November 6, 2023.

On January 5, 2015, WGTK rebranded as "970 The Answer".

=== Word Broadcasting ownership ===
On December 22, 2016, it was announced that Word Broadcasting Network, owner of then-Ion Television affiliate WBNA (channel 21, now an independent station) and operator of non-commercial Contemporary Christian station WJIE-FM, would take over operations of WGTK and sister stations WFIA and WFIA-FM under a local marketing agreement, effective January 3, 2017. On February 10, 2020, Word Broadcasting announced that it would take advantage of the option in its agreement to acquire the stations from Salem for $4 million; the sale was completed on May 25, 2022.

On February 17, 2022, it was announced that Louisville First Media Group, a partnership between the operators of both WLCL and WGTK, had struck a broadcast rights deal, wherein the two stations would replace WHAS and WKRD as the official home for University of Louisville Cardinals athletics. The two stations carry all of the university's football, men's and women's basketball, and baseball games; seasonal football and basketball coaches shows; and a daily "Cardinal Insider" program (which also airs on Word Media Group-owned WXVW). Previous flagship WHAS had prioritized in-state rivals, the University of Kentucky Wildcats, with conflicting Cardinals games airing on WKRD.

== Programming ==
On weekdays, WGTK runs nationally syndicated Salem Radio Network talk shows: Hugh Hewitt, Mike Gallagher, Chris Stigall, Larry Elder and Charlie Kirk. In addition, it carries shows hosted by Dan Bongino, Rich Valdes and Bill O'Reilly.

Weekends feature some specialty shows as well as repeats of weekday programs. WGTK had aired a local midday show with former WHAS host Joe Elliott but that was discontinued in the fall of 2015. The station begins most hours with Townhall Radio News. WGTK is the radio home of Louisville Cardinals football as well as men's and women's basketball.
