= WAKY-FM =

Simulcast with WAKY (AM) Louisville
- Radcliff, Kentucky; United States
- Broadcast area: Louisville metropolitan area
- Frequency: 103.5 MHz
- Branding: 103.5 WAKY

Programming
- Format: Oldies
- Affiliations: Fox News Radio; Kentucky Wildcats

Ownership
- Owner: Wakyana LLC
- Sister stations: WAKY

History
- First air date: July 25, 1995
- Former call signs: WUOX (1991–1992); WLVK (1992–1995); WASE (1995–2007); WAKY (2007–2014)
- Call sign meaning: "Wacky"

Technical information
- Licensing authority: FCC
- Facility ID: 70495
- Class: C3
- ERP: 3,500 watts
- HAAT: 238.9 meters (784 ft)
- Transmitter coordinates: 37°52′45.2″N 85°43′2.9″W

Links
- Public license information: Public file; LMS
- Webcast: Listen live
- Website: wakyradio.com

WAKY-FM (103.5 MHz) is a commercial radio station licensed to Radcliff, Kentucky, United States, and serving the Louisville metropolitan area. It airs an oldies format and is owned by Wakyana LLC. It carries University of Kentucky Wildcasts football and basketball. The studios are located on Ring Road in Elizabethtown.

WAKY-FM's transmitter is sited off Collings Hill Road in Lebanon Junction, with its signal concentrated on the suburbs south of Louisville. Programming is simulcast on WAKY (620 AM) and on three FM translators at 100.1, 104.5 and 106.3 MHz around the Louisville area.

== History ==
The station was assigned the call sign WUOX on November 1, 1991. On October 30, 1992, the station changed its call sign to WLVK; on July 17, 1995, it became WASE, and under this identity it signed on July 25 as an oldies station, "Kool 103.5". Plans for the oldies format and WASE call sign to move to 103.5 from 105.5 in Fort Knox, and the relaunch of 105.5 as country station WLVK, had been made as early as 1993.

On May 11, 2007, the call sign was changed to WAKY; on December 3, 2014, it was modified to WAKY-FM. In May 2015, it began simulcasting on WAKY (620 AM), after W&B Broadcasting purchased that station from Davidson Media a year earlier. The WAKY call sign and classic hits format are an homage to the original WAKY (790 AM), a Top 40 contemporary music station from the late 1950s to the late 1970s. The original WAKY later became an oldies station from 1982 to 1986 and is now Fox Sports Radio affiliate WKRD.

Since former competitor WRKA (103.1 FM) dropped its classic hits format in favor of country music, WAKY-FM is now the only mainstream classic hits station in the Louisville market playing the pop hits of the 1970s, 1980s and 1990s. Currently, the WAKY-AM-FM studios are south of the Fort Knox Army Reservation in Radcliff, Kentucky, about 27 miles (43 km) south of Louisville.

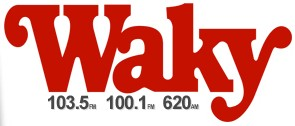
Logo before 104.9 and 106.3 translator sign ons

W&B Broadcasting sold the WAKY stations to Wakyana LLC, a group led by Randy Michaels, for $1.3 million in 2025.

== Translators ==
WAKY-AM-FM programming is also heard on three FM translators:

- 100.1 W261CO serves Louisville inside the Interstate 264 (Watterson/Shawnee Expressway) corridor (along with New Albany, Clarksville, and Jeffersonville in Southern Indiana.
- 104.3 W285ER serves Prospect, Kentucky and Charlestown, Indiana.
- 106.3 W292FS serves Jeffersontown and Lake Forest.
