= Slocum High School =

Location
- 5765 East State Hwy 294; Elkhart, Anderson County, Texas 75839-9802; United States; 31.630571°N 95.467039°W

Information
- School type: Public, high school
- Motto: Excellence in Education
- Locale: Rural: Remote
- School district: Slocum ISD
- Superintendent: Cliff Lasiter
- NCES School ID: 481977001939
- Principal: Erin Deer
- Faculty: 11.72 (on an FTE basis)
- Grades: 9–12
- Enrollment: 82 (2023–2024)
- Student to teacher ratio: 7.00
- Colors: Blue & White
- Athletics conference: UIL Class AA
- Mascot: Mustangs
- Website: www.slocumisd.org

Slocum High School is a public high school located in unincorporated Slocum, Texas, United States and classified as a 2A school by the UIL. It has an Elkhart mailing address and is part of the Slocum Independent School District located in southeastern Anderson County. During 2023–2024, Slocum High School had an enrollment of 82 students and a student to teacher ratio of 7.00. The school received an overall rating of "A" from the Texas Education Agency for the 2022–2023 school year.

== Academics and debate ==
Slocum High School participates in the following academic and debate competitions:

- UIL Academics
- CX Debate

=== State runner-up titles ===
- CX Debate
  - 2019 (2A)

== Athletics ==
Slocum High School participates in the following sports

- Baseball
- Basketball
- Cross Country
- Softball
- Track and Field

=== State titles ===
- Boys Basketball
  - 2009 (1A/D2)
- Girls Softball
  - 2017 (1A)
- Girls Softball
  - 2018 (1A)
