= Slocum Independent School District =

School district in Texas, United States

Coordinates: 31°37′55″N 95°27′44″W

Location
- Slocum, Texas ESC Region 7 USA

District information
- Type: Public Independent school district
- Grades: EE through 12
- Superintendent: Cliff Lasiter
- Schools: 2
- NCES District ID: 4840500

Students and staff
- Students: 332 (2023–2024)
- Teachers: 33.95 (on an FTE basis) (2023–2024)
- Staff: 31.34 (on an FTE basis) (2023–2024)
- Student–teacher ratio: 9.78 (2023–2024)

Other information
- Website: www.slocumisd.org

Slocum Independent School District is a public school district based in the community of Slocum in unincorporated Anderson County, Texas (USA).

Located in southeastern Anderson County, the district has two campuses:

- Slocum High School (Grades 9–12)
- Slocum Elementary School and Junior High (Grades EE-8)

In 2009, the school district was rated "recognized" by the Texas Education Agency.
