= WAXL =

- Santa Claus, Indiana; United States
- Frequency: 103.3 MHz
- Branding: 103.3 The Fix

Programming
- Format: Hot adult contemporary
- Affiliations: Westwood One; Indianapolis Colts Radio Network; Indiana Pacers Radio Network; Network Indiana

Ownership
- Owner: Dubois County Broadcasting, Inc.
- Sister stations: WXGO, WBDC, WORX-FM

History
- First air date: July 30, 1996
- Former call signs: WAIX (1994–1995); WAZU (1995–1996)

Technical information
- Licensing authority: FCC
- Facility ID: 64420
- Class: A
- ERP: 3,000 watts
- HAAT: 141 meters (463 ft)
- Transmitter coordinates: type:city 38°12′31.00″N 86°54′0.00″W

Links
- Public license information: Public file; LMS
- Webcast: Webcast
- Website: waxl.us

WAXL (103.3 FM) is a radio station broadcasting a hot adult contemporary format. It is licensed to Santa Claus, Indiana, United States. The station is currently owned by Dubois County Broadcasting, Inc. and features programming from Westwood One.

== History ==
The station went on the air as WAIX on August 19, 1994. On June 1, 1995, it changed its call sign to WAZU, and in August 1996 to the current WAXL.

In November 2023, WAXL announced that it would hold a Christmas music stunt for the holiday season from November 23 to December 25 as Jolly FM—one notably distinguished by the station being licensed to Santa Claus, Indiana.
