= WORX-FM =

- Madison, Indiana; United States
- Frequency: 96.7 MHz (HD Radio)
- Branding: WORX 96.7 FM

Programming
- Format: Hot adult contemporary
- Affiliations: Westwood One

Ownership
- Owner: Dubois County Broadcasting, Inc.
- Sister stations: WXGO, WBDC, WAXL

History
- First air date: 1950
- Former call signs: WORX-FM (1950–1981); WCJC (1981–1987)

Technical information
- Licensing authority: FCC
- Facility ID: 17622
- Class: A
- ERP: 1,050 watts
- HAAT: 168.0 meters (551.2 ft)
- Transmitter coordinates: 38°44′32.00″N 85°21′43.00″W

Links
- Public license information: Public file; LMS
- Webcast: Listen Live
- Website: worxradio.com

WORX-FM (96.7 FM) is a radio station broadcasting a Hot Adult Contemporary format. Licensed to Madison, Indiana, United States, the station is currently owned by Dubois County Broadcasting, Inc. and features programming from Westwood One. The station is also broadcast on HD radio.

== History ==
The station was assigned call sign WORX-FM in 1950. The station was built by Louisville radio engineer and entrepreneur Clarance Henson and owned by numerous families until 1980, when Dubois County Broadcasting bought the station. On January 10, 1981, the station changed its call sign to WCJC. On January 4, 1987, the station changed back to the current WORX-FM.
