= Slocum, Texas =

Slocum
- Unincorporated community
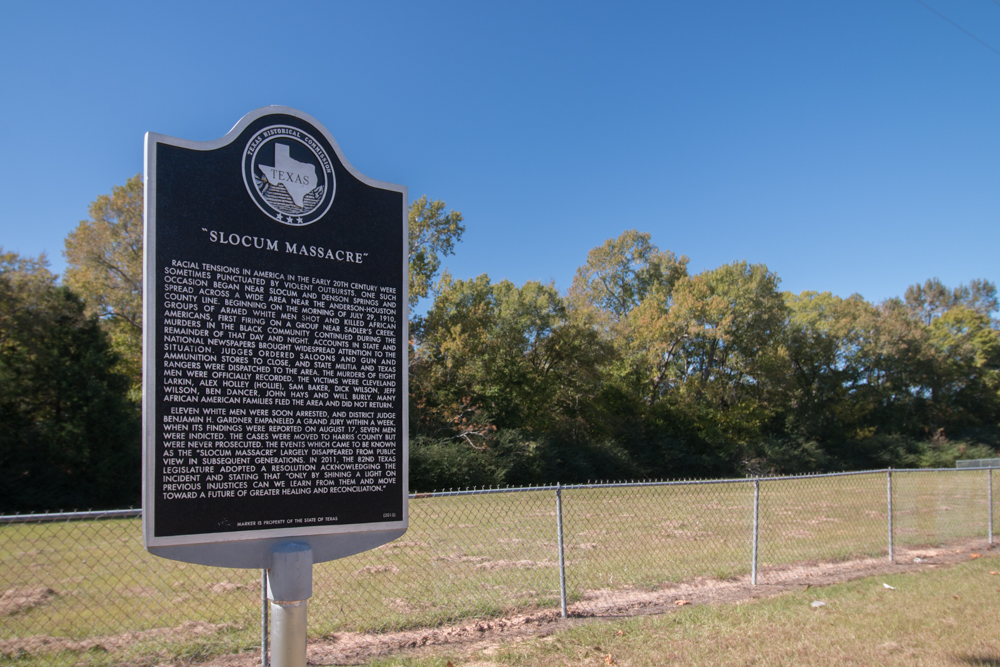

- Location within the state of Texas Slocum (the United States)
- Coordinates: 31°37′53″N 95°27′44″W
- Country: United States
- State: Texas
- County: Anderson

Government
- Time zone: UTC−6 (Central (CST))
  - Summer (DST): UTC−5 (CDT)
- ZIP Codes: 75839
- Area codes: 903, 430

Slocum is an unincorporated community in southeastern Anderson County, Texas, United States. According to the Handbook of Texas, the community had a population of 198 in 2018. It is located within the Palestine, Texas micropolitan area.

Slocum is notable as the site of what is known as the Slocum massacre, an unprovoked attack by a large mob of whites on what was then a majority-black community on July 29–30, 1910. Some twenty-two Blacks were documented as killed; other estimates are that up to ten times that number may have been murdered.

== History ==
The community's name is thought to have originated with E.T. McDaniel, the first shopkeeper and postmaster, who had long sought to get a post office for the community. When the town was authorized a US post office in 1898, the residents called it a "slow come." Other reported reasons for the name Slocum include slow-coming fortunes being made, or town growth being slow. It developed as a place of majority black settlement, by freedmen and their descendants. They established families, businesses, and farms. After the 1910 massacre described below, many surviving blacks left the area for good to save their lives.

In 1914, the community had two general stores and 45 people; by 1927 the population increased to 200. By 1939 the community had rebuilt and had eight new businesses and 160 inhabitants. The discovery of oil in nearby fields caused the community's economy to receive a boost in the late 1950s, and by 1964, the community's population grew to 200 residents. Afterward, the community declined to 110 people in 1970. It grew to 125 in 1974, holding there until 1990. The community had four businesses, two churches, and a few homes in the mid-1980s. It doubled to 250 in 2000 but declined to 175 in 2014.

=== Slocum massacre of 1910 ===
On July 29–30, 1910, a mob of 200 to 300 armed white men, most on horseback, started attacking Slocum, where they killed an unknown number of African Americans. Historians have offered several explanations for what sparked the event. Contemporary newspapers, including The New York Times, originally reported 8 to 22 deaths among blacks. But evidence indicates more, and survivors' stories say that the actual death toll may have reached upward of 200 victims. Bodies were found across a wide area, including in fields and canebrakes.

Before the massacre, the majority of Slocum's several hundred residents were black. During and after the riot, many black residents fled the town to save their lives. They were forced to abandon real estate, homes, and other assets. Their property was seized, and the victims never received compensation from the county or state.

A historical marker about the massacre, dedicated in January 2016, is located one-half mile (0.80 km) south of Slocum, on FM 2022.

=== 1929 tornado ===
A tornado demolished Slocum in 1929, causing eight deaths and 150 injuries. Only two houses were left standing in the settlement. A mule was swept up into a tree during the tornado, and rescuers had to cut the tree down to bring it back to safety. One of the saws from the sawmill was also stuck in a tree. A woman named Vic Lively said her cousin's house was picked up and set down to face another direction. Other accounts said that a local door was found across the river. A wagon with a team still attached by harnesses was found in a pasture after it was swept away by the tornado. One of the horses had a 2x4 sticking out of its back but survived. Another resident saw cars rushing to the scene to see the damage caused by the tornado. Clothes from a nearby store destroyed by the tornado were found stuck in trees as if they decorated the town. Survivors tore up available clothes to use as bandages for people wounded in the tornado. A little girl carried her little brother's dead body two miles from her home in search of help. Her birthday gifts from a party the day before blew away during the tornado; none was found again.

== Geography ==
Farm to Market Road 2022 intersects at Texas State Highway 294 at Slocum, located 12 mi (19 km) southeast of Palestine. It is in the southeastern part of Anderson County in East Texas.

== Education ==
Slocum had its own school in the mid-1980s. The Slocum Independent School District serves area students who attend Slocum High School and Slocum Elementary School. It is a very small school system: as of 2016–2017, there were around 300 students in grades K 12. It is registered as a 1A by UIL. Slocum ISD recently completed construction of the new Slocum High School, which opened for the 2016–2017 school year. The high school's track team has competed at the state level, although the school had no track. They trained by running through pastures.

F. Ernest Day was a teacher and coach at the school. He had been the star pitcher of the community's baseball team in the early 1900s.

During the 1929 tornado, school superintendent Thomas Gatlin ordered students to hide under their desks. Although the two-story frame school building was destroyed, none of the students was injured or killed.

== Civic support ==
Slocum has one volunteer fire department. The VFD holds an annual BBQ and school reunion to raise money to provide for the needs of the fire department. There is also a community-wide reunion held at the school's cafeteria on the Sunday before Mother's Day. Women who live in the community bring homemade cakes and other goodies.
