= Dickens on Main =

Dickens on Main Street was a winter festival held on historic West Main Street, Louisville, Kentucky. The event was first produced by the Preservation Alliance, and later by Bridge the Gap, Inc., a non-profit organization that grew out of a holiday gift drive at WLRS-FM. Louisa Henson of Henson Broadcasting served as president of this organization.
