= WBDC =

- Huntingburg, Indiana; United States
- Frequency: 100.9 MHz (HD Radio)
- Branding: 101 Country WBDC

Programming
- Format: Country music

Ownership
- Owner: Dubois County Broadcasting, Inc.
- Sister stations: WXGO, WORX-FM, WAXL

Technical information
- Licensing authority: FCC
- Facility ID: 17623
- Class: B1
- ERP: 11,000 watts
- HAAT: 150 meters (490 ft)
- Transmitter coordinates: 38°12′31.00″N 86°54′0.00″W

Links
- Public license information: Public file; LMS
- Website: www.wbdc.us

WBDC (100.9 FM) is a radio station broadcasting a country music format. Licensed to Huntingburg, Indiana, United States, the station is currently owned by Dubois County Broadcasting, Inc. and features programming from Westwood One. The station is also broadcast on HD radio.
