= Clarance Henson (radio entrepreneur) =

American radio engineer and entrepreneur

Clarance Edward Henson
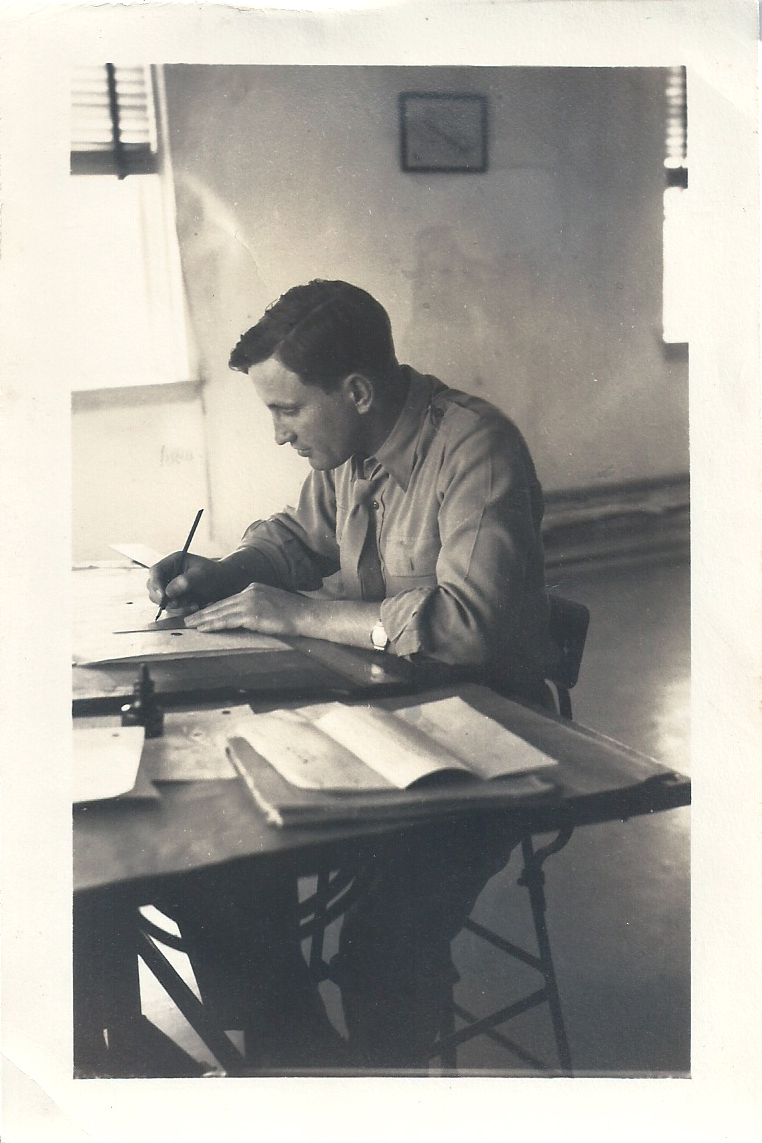
- Clarance Henson in 1940
- Born: 1916; Oil City, Louisiana, U.S.
- Died: 2003 (aged 86–87)
- Education: John Brown University
- Occupations: Radio engineer, broadcast engineer, entrepreneur
- Awards: Kentucky Mike Award

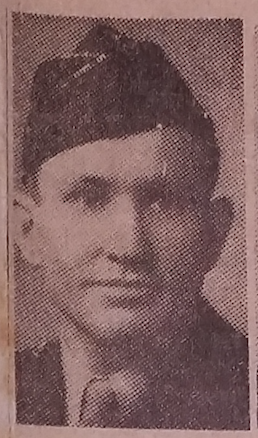

Clarance Edward Henson (1916–2003) was a radio engineer, entrepreneur and wartime developer of Long Range Navigational Radar (LORAN). He was born in Oil City, Louisiana, in 1916, to Louisa and Samuel Henson. After Samuel's death in 1921, Henson moved frequently, growing up in Smackover, Arkansas, Palestine, Longview, Henderson, and Kilgore in Texas before graduating from high school in Fort Smith, Arkansas.

== Education ==
An amateur radio enthusiast from a young age, he was educated at John Brown University where he worked at the university station, KVOH. He started to work as an engineer at WHAS radio in 1939 and left in 1960 to start his own companies.

== Wartime service ==
During World War II, Henson was recruited into the Office of Scientific Research and Development and later served at MIT's Radiation Laboratory (Rad Lab) and was a technical observer in the U.S. Army, where he was brevetted as a major. At the Rad Lab, he worked with the development and installation of the LORAN navigational system. After a stint in Massachusetts, he then installed LORAN stations throughout the world, including in Canada (Labrador Bay and Newfoundland), Great Britain, Ireland, the Faroe Islands, the Shetland Islands, Iceland, Italy, France, Greece, North Africa, Egypt, Iran, Iraq, India, Ceylon (Sri Lanka) and Tibet from 1942 to 1945. Henson worked with the RAF in London during Nazi Germany's V-1 and V-2 rocket strikes, where he helped triangulate bombing raids over enemy territory. He also worked with the RAF to set up the Indian Air Force's 51 Radio School in Bangalore.

== Post-War radio career ==
Henson, with engineer Russell Warren and Bob McGregor, founded the Louisville Radio School in February 1946. Henson defied the Kentucky Day Law by admitting black army veterans, making the Louisville Radio School one of the first racially integrated schools in Kentucky.

Henson built WORX-FM 96.7 in Madison, Indiana in 1950, when FM licenses were more easily obtained than AM ones. Henson actually sold the FM but bought it back when he put WORX-AM on the air at 1270 kHz in 1956. In 1981, Henson sold WORX-AM and FM to Dubois County Broadcasting. In 1961, Henson put WXVW on the air in partnership with Keith Reising.

In 1964, the Louisville Radio School's station WLRS-FM went on the air at 102.3 MHz and was the city's first successful, stand-alone commercial FM station, eventually broadcasting from the top of the 800 Building, at the time Louisville's tallest building. In addition to WLRS, his company Henson Broadcasting owned and operated, at various times, WAVG in Louisville (acquired 1981 from the Norton family's Orion Broadcasting); WXVW in Jeffersonville, Indiana; WORX and WORX-FM in Madison, Indiana; and KISO and KLOZ in El Paso, Texas. The station grew and would eventually host a Christmastime street fair, Dickens on Main, and a charity drive, Bridge the Gap, which grew into a nonprofit that outlived the station.

Henson was a consulting broadcast engineer for over 60 years. In 1947, he founded, owned and operated Electronic Laboratories, a consulting broadcast engineering company. Bud Walters’ Cromwell Radio Group and WBNA TV were among those who sought his expertise. He was also part owner of another engineering company, CEPEDA Associates, which did contract work on the Navy's Seawolf-class submarine. and is an active defense contractor as of 2026.

He received the Kentucky Broadcasting Association's (KBA) Kentucky Mike Award to recognize his lifetime achievement in the broadcast industry in Kentucky. Much of his legacy in broadcast engineering circles was due to his training and encouraging a large number of engineers throughout the region. In 2022, the KBA Legacy Awards Committee renamed the Technology Award in his memory of the late Clarance E. Henson to honor the career and/or technical achievements of exceptional broadcast engineers in Kentucky.
