= WXGO =

- Madison, Indiana; United States
- Broadcast area: Louisville, Kentucky
- Frequency: 1270 kHz
- Branding: WXGO 100.9 FM/1270 AM

Programming
- Format: Classic hits
- Affiliations: Westwood One; Cincinnati Reds

Ownership
- Owner: Dubois County Broadcasting, Inc.
- Sister stations: WBDC, WORX-FM, WAXL

History
- First air date: 1956

Technical information
- Licensing authority: FCC
- Facility ID: 17624
- Class: D
- Power: 1,000 watts day 58 watts night
- Transmitter coordinates: 38°44′28.00″N 85°21′41.00″W
- Translator: 100.9 W265DK (Madison)

Links
- Public license information: Public file; LMS
- Website: worxradio.com

WXGO (1270 AM) is a radio station broadcasting a classic hits format. Licensed to Madison, Indiana, United States, the station serves the Louisville area. Built by Louisville-based engineer and entrepreneur Clarance Henson in the 1950s and originally known as WORX-AM, the station is currently owned by Dubois County Broadcasting, Inc. and features programming from Westwood One and the Cincinnati Reds.

Logo before translator sign on

== Translator ==
EKU presently operates one low-power FM translator stations.

Broadcast translator for WXGO
Call sign	Frequency	City of license	FID	ERP (W)	HAAT	Class	Transmitter coordinates	FCC info	Notes
W265DK	100.9 FM	Madison, Indiana	144379	250	112 m (367 ft)	D	38°44′32.2″N 85°21′42.8″W	LMS	Formerly W297BR (January–May 2016)
