= Slocum massacre =

1910 mass killing of African Americans in Texas

Coordinates: 31°37′53″N 95°27′44″W

- Part of terrorism in the United States and the nadir of American race relations
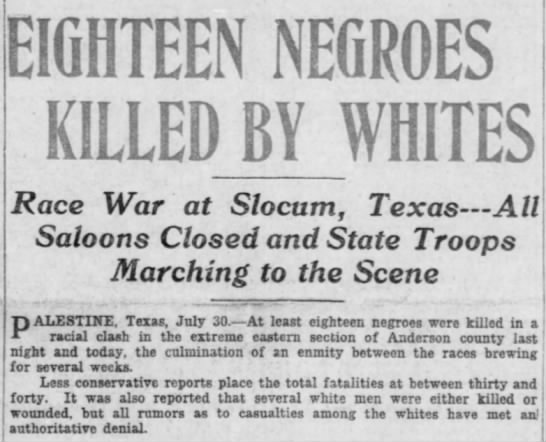
- Headline and lead paragraph in The Salt Lake Herald-Republican of July 31, 1910
- Location: Slocum, Texas
- Date: July 29–30, 1910
- Target: Black residents; Black-owned property and businesses
- Attack type: Arson; Assault; Murder; Political terrorism; Property damage/theft; Widespread intimidation

The Slocum massacre was a mass killing of Black residents by white mobs on July 29–30, 1910, in Slocum, an unincorporated community in Anderson County near Palestine in East Texas. The death toll reported by major newspapers ranged between eight and 22, but evidence suggests as many as 200 African Americans were killed.

Historians have offered several explanations for the sparking of the riot and massacre by whites. At the time, rumors placed responsibility on the Black community, falsely claiming that white people in Slocum had armed in response to accounts of members of the Black community planning a race war. The whites from the mob did their best to destroy any local evidence against them. Black people around Slocum appealed to higher levels of government for a fair investigation, but little to nothing was done on their behalf. As a result, the Black population in Slocum declined drastically, as many left in fear for their lives.

== Background ==
Long before the Slocum massacre occurred, racial violence against Black people had been part of the state's history. In East Texas, where the majority of Black people had lived since before the American Civil War, enslaved African Americans had been brought by enslaving "planters" and "traders" to develop and work cotton plantations. Several counties had enslaved Black majorities. In the aftermath of the war, whites resented the emancipation and enfranchisement of formerly enslaved people. In the post-Reconstruction era, white Democrats regained control of county and state governments and passed laws at the turn of the century to disenfranchise African Americans.

By the turn of the century, at least 335 lynchings already had occurred, of which 261 victims were Black. Most of these lynchings were based on allegations made by white people against Black people. Though the justice system discriminated against Black Americans, most lynching victims never received a trial. Several lynchings of Black people in Texas had taken place in the time before the Slocum massacre.

Black people had struggled to gain social equality, as well as economic equality, and they were frequently assigned only old, overworked plots for growing crops as tenant farmers or sharecroppers. They kept their farming land to smaller sizes to avoid trouble with jealous white people. The combination of unfruitful land and small farms made Black communities more susceptible to falling into debt when they did not have a good harvest season. Institutional white supremacy made Black people threatened and targeted if they tried to advance economically.

== Massacre ==
The Slocum massacre was originally said to have been sparked by two separate events. First, an argument had happened over a promissory note between Marsh Holley, a Black businessman, and Reddin Alford, a disabled white farmer. Holley had not thought it was a serious argument, but white people in Slocum heard that Holley was trying to cheat a disabled farmer, or Alford had lied and said that Holley was threatening him.

Secondly, Black farmer Abe Wilson was sent to inform people of road maintenance in the area. A white farmer, Jim Spurger, got upset because he thought it was a violation of white supremacy to have a Black man helping the community. Again, rumors distorted events. Wilson was rumored to be supervising a white road crew, which upset white people. Sometime after the massacre, some people wondered if Spurger was worried about Black people flirting with his daughters.

Another reported cause of the Slocum massacre was the defeat of James J. Jeffries, a white boxer, by Jack Johnson, a Black boxer, in what was billed as the "Fight of the Century". Resentful white people caused more than one race riot in 1910 after Jeffries' defeat.

Though these stories most likely contributed to the Slocum massacre, some white people in Anderson County believed rumors that a Black uprising was being planned in retaliation for the recent lynching of a Black man in the area. White members put out a call to white men from nearby counties to come to their aid. As a precaution, the white people hid their women and children in schools and churches before setting out to hunt down Black people around Slocum. White men stocked up on guns and ammunition and drank alcohol. District Judge Benjamin Howard Gardner Sr. (b. 1854 - d. 1947) realized that the combination of alcohol, guns, and rumors about Black uprisings could create a dangerous and potentially deadly outcome. Before the murders began, he tried to counteract it by imposing a court order that closed all saloons, gun stores, and hardware stores, but he was too late. White men involved in the massacre had already obtained their weapons.

The violence began on July 29, when six white men confronted and attacked a group of Black teenagers. Most of the teenagers escaped, but one was murdered by the mob. Soon after, mobs of up to 50 white men were formed throughout Anderson County; these groups raided Black neighborhoods and attempted to kill any Black person they encountered. Some mobs shot Black people as they tried to flee through the forest. The Slocum massacre lasted through the night, for 16 hours. Though only five casualties were confirmed, the number was likely much higher.

Sheriff William H. Black said, "Men were going about killing Negroes as fast as they could find them, and so far as I was able to ascertain, without any real cause". He also described it as "There was just a hot-headed gang hunting them down and killing them.…They were just hunting the Negroes down like sheep."

After the bloodshed ended, Sheriff Black and Sheriff Lacy from the surrounding area arrived in Anderson County to address and investigate the massacre of Black people in Slocum. When they arrived, they said everyone was afraid, and all white males were armed. Sheriff Black and Godfrey Rees Fowler went to the scene to complete a thorough investigation of the events. Sheriff Black ruled that whites did not have a legitimate reason to kill, since the white people attacked even when Black people did not.

Deputy Sheriff Stubblefield was also called to the scene. White people in Anderson County started a rumor of a threat of assassination by a Black community member, demonstrating that white people were willing to start another massacre. Knowing of the fear griping Black populations, and in order to try to prevent white people from conducting more mass murders and causing further chaos, Governor Thomas Mitchell Campbell ordered Texas Rangers and the Texas Militia to Anderson County. The Texas Rangers began their work by attempting to help Black women and children (though the majority-white Rangers were not always trusted within Black communities). On the Rangers' search after arriving, they saw that Black neighborhoods were empty, and their property was frequently stolen. The Rangers confirmed that Black people knew that white people were hunting them.

Even with the rumor of a Black uprising against whites proven false, Marsh Holley, a witness to murders and one of the reasons that the Slocum massacre began in the first place, was put in jail for his protection. He denied that the promissory note was the cause of the massacre.

The burial site of Black people murdered by white mobs was said to be on Abe Wilson's land, and that six deaths had occurred; the deceased were wrapped in blankets, put in pine boxes, and buried in a trench. Others said that peoples' bodies were thrown in the ditch. Others reported seeing bodies abandoned in woods, fields, and canebrakes. The final death toll was never determined. By the 1920 census, at least one-half of the Black population had left Slocum.

Black resident Jack Holley survived the massacre; he fled the area with his family, leaving the granary, dairy, and general store that he had built up as a freedman. Other Holley family survivors included Wilustus "Lusk" Holley, who witnessed his brother, Alex, being murdered. He escaped by playing dead and soon moved to Fort Worth. Reagan and Marshall Holley stayed in Anderson County for the rest of their lives. Besides the Holleys, seven other men who died in the massacre were Cleveland "Cleve" Larkin, Sam Baker, Dick and Jeff Wilson, Ben Dancer, John Hays, and Will Burly.

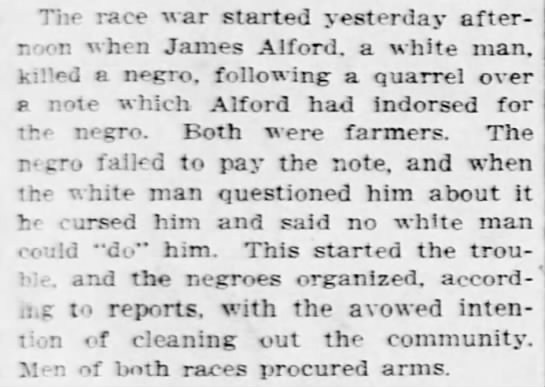
Excerpt of a front-page article published in the New-York Tribune stating that "negroes organized...with the avowed intention of cleaning out the community."

== Reactions ==
Newspapers including Palestine Daily Herald, Fort Worth Star-Telegram, Greenville Morning Herald, Fort Worth Record, The Galveston Daily, New-York Tribune, and Abilene Daily News all mentioned that conflict in Anderson County was started by Black people or race riots, which put blame on the Black victims. This caused violence towards Black Americans to increase significantly. However, The Palestine Daily Herald told some parts of the truth about how white people thought that Black people were plotting against them. The title of the article in The New York Times was "Score of Negroes Killed by Whites" and discussed the wrongful killings of Black people in Slocum and the poor reasons behind the massacre.

Twenty years after the massacre, a man named Hayes owned land in Slocum that the town needed. In exchange for the land, he requested that the city establish a historical marker to remember the Black community members who were murdered. His request was denied, and the town said it no longer needed the land.

Despite efforts by Black Americans to draw attention to the massacre, the federal government refused to investigate the murders or bringing criminal prosecutions, which was common treatment when it came to Black people seeking justice. John A. Siddon, a Volga postmaster, sent a letter to Cecil A. Lyons, chairman of the Texas Republican State Executive Committee in Sherman, asking for his help in securing a federal investigation. Lyons forwarded the letter to the United States Attorney General, George W. Wickersham. Whether Siddon even received a response is unknown.

A group of local Black ministers also appealed for federal help in a letter to President Taft. They wanted a "Doctrine of Fairness" and suffrage granted to them by the government, with no loopholes and under the protection of the law. Taft sent this letter to Wickersham, and he responded to the ministers by saying that the federal government could not fulfill their requests or become involved because no constitutional rights were being violated in any of these instances. However, the federal government did become involved when a Mexican American was lynched in Texas.

=== 21st century ===
In the early 21st century, the Slocum massacre is considered by some to be forgotten, because it is not taught in Texas public schools. Some white people have even falsely claimed that it did not happen. In 2011, the 82nd Texas Legislature adopted Resolution 865, officially acknowledging that the massacre occurred. It stated the murders were unjust and wrongfully committed, but did not commit the legislature to conduct an investigation.

== Suspects involved in the massacre ==
During the early 1900s, indictments and prosecutions tended to side with white mobs in cases of crimes against Black Americans. Anderson County District Court Judge Benjamin H. Gardner released a statement that said that law enforcement would start turning away and shooting to kill (if necessary) those who sympathized with the mobs or participated in them. He also said that he would no longer tolerate law enforcement officers who favored the mobs. Gardner called a grand jury to identify suspects in the case and intended to prosecute men indicted as a result.

After investigations and arrests began, Texas Rangers arrested Josh Bishop, Isom Garner, and Walter Ferguson. Anderson County Deputy Sheriff Riley Reeves arrested Jim Spurger, who was involved in one of the initial conflicts. G. W. Bailey, Morgan Henrey, Frank Bridge, Andrew Kirkwood, and B.J. Jenkins were arrested, as well. Despite the investigations and arrests, law enforcement was unable to conclude how many people had died at the hands of the mobs.

Judge Gardner knew that whites would have the majority even if a crime was committed, so he asked the jurors to excuse themselves if completing a fair trial was impossible. On August 5, S.C. Jenkins was arrested, and Ferguson and Bishop were released. On August 14, Lusk Holley and Charlie Wilson were summoned as witnesses, and Curtis Spurger (Jim Spurger's brother) was arrested. On August 17, the murder charges were released. No indictments were made for the murders of Alex Holley or John H. Hay or the attempted murders of Charlie Wilson and Lusk Holley.

Of the indictments, two cases moved forward, but they did not make it to court. By the time the cases were ready for trial, Judge Gardner had been replaced. The new judge released all suspects for $1,500 bail. Gardner still wanted these men behind bars, and he knew they were dangerous because he encountered Jim Spurger and Kirkwood in public. Spurger hit him in the face, and Gardner had to pull a pistol on Kirkwood. His desire for justice was never fulfilled; both Spurger and Kirkwood remained free for the rest of their lives.

=== List of suspects ===
- Josh Bishop: Released
- Isom Garner: Four murder charges, released on $1,500 bail
- Walter Ferguson: Released
- Jim Spurger: Two murder charges, released for $1,500 bail
- G. W. Bailey: Released for $1,500 bail
- Morgan Henrey: Released for $1,500 bail
- Frank Bridge: Released for $1,500 bail
- Andrew Kirkwood: Three murder charges, released for $1,500 bail
- B. J. Jenkins: Four murder charges, released for $1,500 bail
- S. C. Jenkins: Three murder charges, released for $1,500 bail
- Curtis Spurger: Three murder charges, released for $1,500 bail
- Lusk Holley: Witness
- Charlie Wilson: Witness

== Oral histories ==
Historian E. R. Bills has collected oral histories of the massacre, among them accounts from Mable Willis and Annie Mae Killgo. Mable Willis was a young girl at the time. She remembers her parents helping Black people from Slocum by opening their house as a place of refuge for those running from mobs.

Elvie Ewell, a Black girl, said that her father, uncles, and cousins were outside at the beginning of the riot, and were warned that white men were forming mobs and killing any Black people that they could. Her father escaped, and their family moved out of Anderson County.

Lastly, the Sadlers recalled the Barnett family, who were Black, coming to their farm to seek help. The men from the Sadler and Barnett families were armed in an attempt to fight off the mob. The mob made its way to the Sadler farm and were warned that the best shot in town, "Deaf and Dumb Gus", was stationed in the barn with a gun on them (Gus had many health issues and disabilities, but was known to both Black and white people in the community for being a great shot who rarely missed). The mob ultimately went elsewhere in the face of this threat. The Sadlers believed that the mob's retreat from their farm was the end of the Slocum massacre.

Annie Mae Killgo, a young white woman, said that in the weeks leading up to the massacre, local rumors held that a Black uprising would take place. A group of white men found a Black girl near a creek and dunked her head, torturing her until she said that an uprising was being planned, which is the justification the white mobs needed without any evidence. She said Black community members were waiting until all the whites were in church to begin an attack. Killgo stated that in an attempt to provoke the attack before it began, white men placed white women and children in churches and schools. Killgo's father, Robert Duke Killgo, was assigned to "protect" the church. She said that the other white men and he, guarding the church, shot 16 to 18 Black people who approached the church. Afterward, Robert Killgo fled to Georgia to avoid being arrested as a suspect.

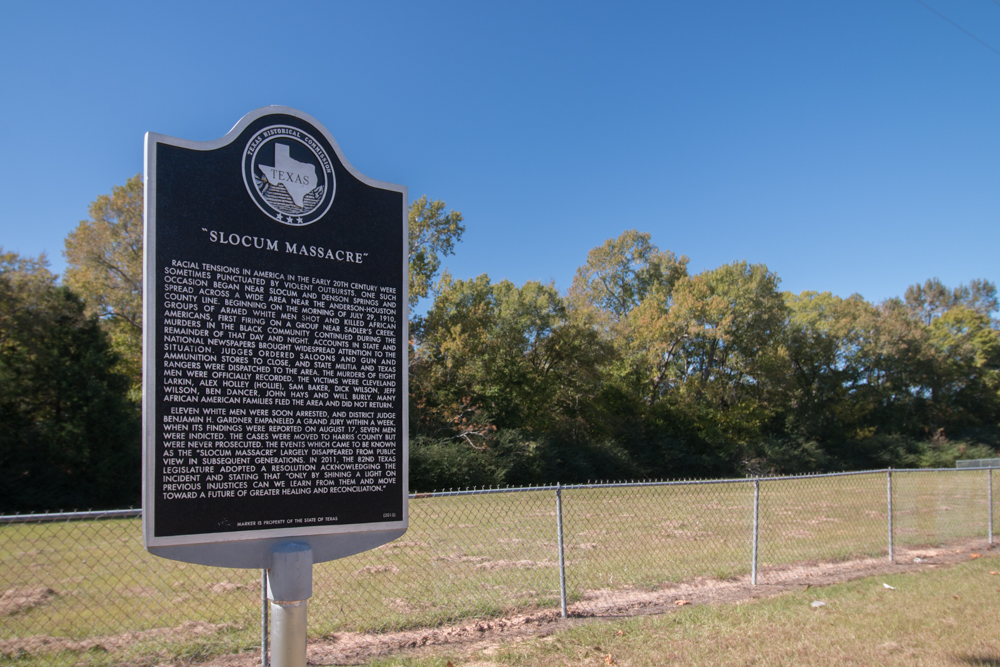
Historical marker for the Slocum massacre

== Historical marker ==
In August 2014, Constance Hollie-Jawaid, a Dallas Independent School District administrator whose great-grandfather, Jack Holley, was among victims of the Slocum massacre, enlisted historian Bills to help apply for a Texas state historical marker commemorating the massacre. White members of the Anderson County Historical Commission opposed the application, claiming a lack of evidence and stating that a race riot had not happened. Hollie-Jawaid then applied directly to the Texas Historical Commission, which approved the marker on January 29, 2015. On January 16, 2016, a historical marker telling the story of the massacre was dedicated; it is located one-half mile (0.80 km) south of Slocum, on FM 2022. The marker identifies, by name, several men who were killed in the riot.

== Works about the Slocum massacre ==
The most comprehensive treatment of the Slocum massacre is the book The 1910 Slocum Massacre: An Act of Genocide in East Texas (ISBN 978-1540209580) written by E. R. Bills and published in 2014. In 2020, Bills and Hollie-Jawaid co-authored Ghosts of Slocum (ISBN 978-0578787473), an illustrated screenplay "as told by its victims".

The massacre and its backstory are also the subjects of unpublished essays: "Bad Saturday: Revisiting the 1910 Slocum Massacre", by Norris White Jr., a Stephen F. Austin State University student, and "Racial Disorder in East Texas: The 1910 Slocum Incident" by Linda Sue Stuard, a University of Texas at Tyler student.

== See also ==
- Houston riot of 1917
- List of incidents of civil unrest in the United States
- List of massacres in the United States
- Mass racial violence in the United States
- Racism in the United States
- Tulsa race massacre
