= WJIE-FM =

Radio station in Okolona, Kentucky

Okolona, Kentucky; United States
- Broadcast area: Louisville, Kentucky
- Frequency: 88.5 MHz (HD Radio)
- Branding: 88.5 WJIE

Programming
- Format: Contemporary Christian

Ownership
- Owner: Evangel Schools, Inc.
- Operator: Word Media Group
- Sister stations: WBNA; WBNM-LD; WFIA; WGTK; WLGK; WXVW

History
- First air date: January 1, 1988
- Call sign meaning: "Where Jesus is Exalted"

Technical information
- Licensing authority: FCC
- Facility ID: 19880
- Class: C2
- ERP: 24,500 watts (horizontal); 18,500 watts (vertical)
- HAAT: 190.0 meters (623.4 ft)
- Transmitter coordinates: 38°1′59.2″N 85°45′15.8″W

Links
- Public license information: Public file; LMS
- Webcast: Listen live
- Website: www.wjie.org

WJIE-FM (88.5 FM) is a radio station broadcasting a contemporary Christian format. Licensed to Okolona, Kentucky, United States, the station serves the Louisville area. The station has been listener-supported since signing on.

== History ==
The station went on the air as WJIE on January 1, 1988.
