= WFIA (AM) =

Radio station in Louisville, Kentucky

- Louisville, Kentucky; United States
- Frequency: 900 kHz

Programming
- Format: Christian talk and teaching

Ownership
- Owner: Word Media Group; (Word Broadcasting Network, Inc.)
- Sister stations: WBNA; WBNM-LD; WGTK; WJIE-FM; WLGK; WXVW

History
- First air date: March 24, 1947
- Former call signs: WKYW (1947–1965); WFIA (1965–January 9, 2017); WJIE (January 9 – October 3, 2017); WFIA (October 3, 2017–August 1, 2023); WLGK (August 1–10, 2023)
- Call sign meaning: "With Faith In America"

Technical information
- Licensing authority: FCC
- Facility ID: 55504
- Class: D
- Power: 930 watts daytime; 162 watts nighttime
- Transmitter coordinates: 38°15′57.3″N 85°42′49.9″W
- Translator: 107.3 W297BV (Louisville)

Links
- Public license information: Public file; LMS
- Website: wfiaradio.com

WFIA is an AM radio station on 900 kHz in Louisville, Kentucky. WFIA is owned by Word Media Group through its subsidiary Word Broadcasting Network, Inc. WFIA airs a Christian talk and teaching format, and uses a brokered programming system where religious leaders pay for time on the station and use their programs to seek donations to their ministries.

WFIA broadcasts with a daytime power of 930 watts. As 900 AM is a Mexican clear channel frequency, WFIA reduces power to 162 watts to avoid interference. Programming is also heard on FM translator W29BV at 107.3 MHz.

== History ==
=== WKYW ===
The station began broadcasting as WKYW on March 24, 1947, with a 25-minute preview of programs before initiating full service the next day. The station's original power was 1,000 watts, broadcast from the transmitter site off River Road; because of its location near the Ohio River, the transmitter building was raised on aluminum pontoons. The daytime-only outlet claimed several firsts: its off-air hours were sponsored by a mattress company that paid $6 a night, and one Christmas it recorded its entire programming on tape so all of its employees—save for an engineer—could take the holiday off. In its programming, WKYW emphasized music, with a minimum of talk. WKYW was also noteworthy by the mid-1960s for the use of a helicopter to report traffic conditions.

=== WFIA ===
In 1965, the Polaris Corporation, owners of WKYW, opted to relaunch the station as a religious outlet: WFIA (With Faith In America), effective September 5. Along with the change in call letters, the station ceased to accept beer, wine and tobacco commercials. The traffic helicopter moved over to WAVE.

In 1975, WFIA spawned its first FM sister station, WFIA-FM 103.9. That station remained co-owned in the 1980s as WXLN, a contemporary Christian outlet, while WFIA's programming shifted to religious talk and teaching. WFIA-WXLN was sold in 1989 to Jim Kincer for $2.1 million. This started a decade in which the station changed hands multiple times; when the FM station prepared for a secular flip, its longform religious programming migrated to WFIA. Neon Communications split WFIA and the FM outlet, by that time known as WQLL, by selling them separately in 1994; the buyer for WFIA, paying $500,000, was Regent Broadcasting. Regent was acquired by Jacor in 1996; under Jacor ownership, Ohio River flooding briefly forced WFIA and its riverside transmitter off the air in March 1997, and the University of Louisville allowed the station to temporarily broadcast from an unused tower.

When Jacor was merged into Clear Channel Communications three years later, the company was required to divest 18 radio stations, including WFIA, which was sold to Blue Chip Broadcasting. The ownership carousel ended when Salem Communications acquired WFIA for $1.75 million in 2001.

On December 22, 2016, Salem announced that it would hand operation of its Louisville radio stations, including WFIA, to Word Broadcasting Network (also known as Word Media Group) under a time brokerage agreement. Programming of WFIA was changed to a simulcast of Word's contemporary Christian station WJIE-FM, and the station carried the WJIE call letters for 10 months in 2017 before reverting to WFIA in October. On February 10, 2020, Word Broadcasting announced that it would take advantage of the option in its agreement to acquire the stations from Salem for $4 million; the sale was completed on May 25, 2022.

By 2023, WFIA was again carrying Christian preaching programming, simulcast with WFIA-FM 94.7. WFIA changed its call sign to WLGK on August 1, 2023; on August 10, that call sign was moved to 94.7, with AM 900 again returning to WFIA. The call sign changes were in connection to a format change at WFIA-FM to worship music.

== Translator ==
WFIA's signal is repeated over FM translator station W297BV on 107.3 MHz, also at Louisville.

Broadcast translator for WFIA
| Call sign | Frequency | City of license | FID | ERP (W) | HAAT | Class | Transmitter coordinates | FCC info |
|---|---|---|---|---|---|---|---|---|
| W297BV | 107.3 FM | Louisville, Kentucky | 142519 | 220 | 0 m (0 ft) | D | 38°15′57.5″N 85°42′49.7″W | LMS |
