= David Martin Davies =

American journalist

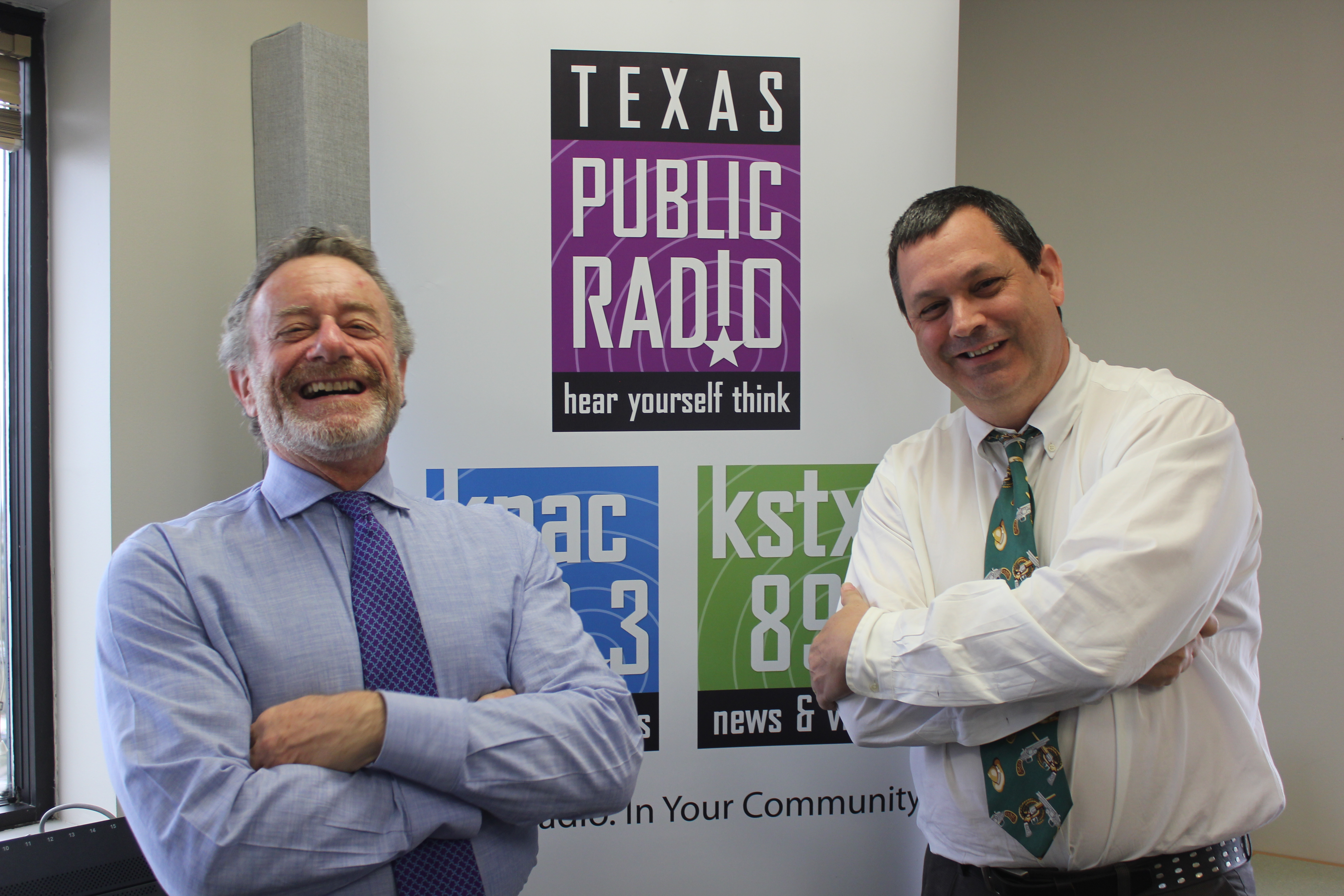
- Davies (right) with Jarl Mohn
- Other names: Dave Davies
- Occupation: journalist
- Employer(s): San Antonio Express-News, Texas Public Radio
- Known for: video games
- Notable work: Host of: U@play (TV), Texas Matters (radio), The Source (radio)

David Martin "Dave" Davies is an American print and broadcast journalist based in Texas.

As a newspaper columnist for the San Antonio Express-News, he writes about video games. In the mid-2000s, Davies was the host of a television show U@Play, produced in the San Antonio area, which covered home video games. The 30-minute show was broadcast in Austin, San Antonio, and Laredo, in Texas, and Monterrey in northeastern Mexico.

Davies is also a journalist and the host of Texas Matters, a weekly radio news magazine show for Texas Public Radio, and The Source, a daily show that airs Monday through Thursday.

Since becoming the news director for Texas Public Radio, Davies began using his full name "David Martin Davies" to avoid confusion with another Dave Davies who appears on National Public Radio.
