= WLVK =

Simulcasting WLGK, New Albany, Indiana
- Fort Knox, Kentucky; United States
- Broadcast area: Radcliff-Elizabethtown, Kentucky
- Frequency: 105.5 MHz
- Branding: The Sound

Programming
- Format: Worship music

Ownership
- Owner: W & B Broadcasting Co., Inc.
- Operator: Word Media Group

History
- First air date: October 1, 1967 (as WSAC-FM)
- Former call signs: WSAC-FM (1967–1980); WWKK (1980–1984); WSAC-FM (1984–1988); WASE (1988–1993); WASE-FM (1993–1995)

Technical information
- Licensing authority: FCC
- Facility ID: 70496
- Class: A
- ERP: 3,200 watts
- HAAT: 139 meters (456 ft)
- Transmitter coordinates: 37°46′57.2″N 85°54′37.9″W

Links
- Public license information: Public file; LMS
- Webcast: Listen live

WLVK (105.5 FM) is a radio station broadcasting a worship music format, simulcasting WLGK (94.7 FM). WLVK is licensed to serve the community of Fort Knox, Kentucky, United States. The station is owned by W & B Broadcasting Co., Inc., and is programmed by Word Media Group under a local marketing agreement.

== History ==
The station went on the air October 1, 1967, as WSAC-FM, owned by the Fort Knox Broadcasting Company as a separately-programmed FM sister station to WSAC. It changed its call sign to WWKK on March 31, 1980, back to WSAC-FM in 1984, and to WASE on January 17, 1988. The station featured Top 40 and adult contemporary formats from the 1960s until 1993. In February 1993, WASE shifted from soft adult contemporary to oldies. On October 14, 1993, the station modified its call sign to WASE-FM; on July 25, 1995, it changed to WLVK, concurrent with the launch of a country music format and the move of the WASE call sign and oldies format to 103.5 FM. Plans for the move had been made as early as 1993.

On April 3, 2022, WLVK flipped from country music to a simulcast of classic hits station WAKY-FM 103.5 (the former WASE). In February 2023, Word Media Group began programming WLVK under a local marketing agreement; Word would launch a contemporary worship music format branded as "The Sound", which in August would begin simulcasting on Word-owned WLGK (94.7 FM).
