= WLGK (FM) =

Radio station in New Albany, Indiana

Coordinates: 38°17′2.2″N 85°54′16.8″W

- New Albany, Indiana; United States
- Broadcast area: Louisville metropolitan area
- Frequency: 94.7 MHz
- Branding: 94.7 The Sound

Programming
- Format: Worship music

Ownership
- Owner: Word Media Group; (Word Broadcasting Network, Inc.)
- Sister stations: WBNA; WBNM-LD; WFIA; WGTK; WJIE-FM; WXVW

History
- First air date: 1995
- Former call signs: WAJE (1994–1996); WRVI (1996–1997); WLSY (1997–2002); WFIA-FM (2002–2023)

Technical information
- Licensing authority: FCC
- Facility ID: 48371
- Class: A
- ERP: 3,300 watts
- HAAT: 120 meters (390 ft)
- Repeater: 105.5 WLVK (Fort Knox, Kentucky)

Links
- Public license information: Public file; LMS
- Webcast: Listen live
- Website: thesound.radio

WLGK (94.7 FM) is a non-commercial, listener-supported radio station licensed to New Albany, Indiana, and serving the Louisville metropolitan area. WLGK is owned by the Word Media Group, and airs a worship music format known as "The Sound". It is simulcast with 105.5 WLVK in Fort Knox, Kentucky.

WLGK has an effective radiated power (ERP) of 3,300 watts. The transmitter is on Corydon Pike in Maplewood, Indiana, near Indiana State Road 62.

== History ==
The station signed on the air in 1995, stunting with christmas music as “Holiday 94.7”. Its original call sign was WAJE. In December 1995, the station officially launched with a rock-leaning Adult Contemporary format as WRVI, “94.7 The River”. On August 27, 1997, WRVI flipped to Urban AC as “Soul 94.7”, with the first song being “We are Family” by Sister Sledge. The call sign was changed to WLSY soon after. In 2002, the station became a sister station to WFIA (900 AM) after being acquired by the Salem Media Group, the largest Christian radio company in the U.S. It mostly simulcast the Christian talk and teaching programming of WFIA.

On December 22, 2016, the Salem Media Group announced that it would hand operation of its Louisville radio stations, including WFIA-FM, to the Word Broadcasting Network (also known as Word Media Group) under a time brokerage agreement. Word Broadcasting ended WFIA-FM's simulcast of WFIA AM, with the AM station changing to a simulcast of Word's contemporary Christian station WJIE-FM.

On February 10, 2020, Word Broadcasting announced that it would take advantage of the option in its agreement to acquire the stations from Salem for $4 million. The sale was completed on May 25, 2022.

On August 7, 2023, WFIA-FM changed its format from Christian talk and teaching to worship music, branded as "94.7 The Sound". It switched its call sign to WLGK on August 10. Programming is simulcast in Fort Knox, Kentucky, on WLVK (105.5 FM), which had launched the format in February 2023 under a local marketing agreement (LMA).
