= WLCL =

Radio station in Sellersburg, Indiana

- Sellersburg, Indiana; United States
- Broadcast area: Louisville metropolitan area
- Frequency: 93.9 MHz
- Branding: 93.9 The Ville

Programming
- Format: Sports radio
- Affiliations: ESPN Radio; University of Louisville Cardinals; Baltimore Ravens Radio Network; Westwood One Sports

Ownership
- Owner: UB Louisville, LLC
- Sister stations: WHBE; WHBE-FM

History
- First air date: February 1, 1990
- Former call signs: WZZB (1990–1991); WQKC (1991–2008); WLCL (2008–2011); WAYI (2011–2014)
- Call sign meaning: Louisville Classic Hits (former format)

Technical information
- Licensing authority: FCC
- Facility ID: 58380
- Class: A
- ERP: 2,650 watts
- HAAT: 152 meters (499 ft)
- Transmitter coordinates: 38°15′21.7″N 85°45′29.1″W

Links
- Public license information: Public file; LMS
- Webcast: Listen live
- Website: www.939theville.com

WLCL (93.9 FM, "93.9 The Ville") is a commercial radio station licensed to Sellersburg, Indiana, United States, and serving the Louisville metropolitan area. The station is owned by Union Broadcasting (UB Louisville, LLC) and airs a sports format with ESPN Radio programmings.

WLCL's transmitter is sited on South 5th Street at Main Street in Louisville.

== History ==
=== Early years ===
The station was first licensed as WZZB on February 1, 1990. On May 24, 1991, the station's license was deleted (DWZZB) but it was later relicensed as WQKC.

WQKC had a sports format but switched to classic hits on November 20, 2008, after changing its call letters to WLCL, which stood for "Louisville's Classic Hits". It was owned by Cumulus Media.

On August 2, 2010, WLCL went silent after Cumulus decided to cease operations in the Louisville market. The station had not given any indication on the air that it was about to go off the air.

=== Way-FM ===
In 2011, the station returned to the air. It was now WAYI, carrying a contemporary Christian music format originating with the WAY-FM Network. WAY-FM ran the station but it was still under the ownership of Cumulus Media, in a local marketing agreement (LMA).

On April 1, 2014, WAY-FM programming was removed from WAYI. The station again went silent on April 25, 2014, and returned to previous call letters WLCL on May 1, 2014.

=== Return to sports ===
In late 2014, Union Broadcasting, which also owns sports radio stations WHBE (680 AM) and WHBE-FM 105.7 in the Louisville radio market, announced that it would purchase WLCL from Cumulus Media. WLCL resumed operations on January 14, 2015, broadcasting ESPN Radio full-time.

The purchase by Union Broadcasting closed on January 21, 2015, at a price of $3.138 million. The station became an affiliate of the Baltimore Ravens Radio Network beginning with the 2019 season. That allowed Louisville Cardinals football fans to follow the National Football League exploits of Lamar Jackson.

=== Louisville Cardinals ===
On February 17, 2022, it was announced that Louisville First Media Group, a partnership between the operators of WLCL and Word Media Group's WGTK, had struck a broadcast rights deal. WHAS and WKRD, owned by iHeartMedia, would be replaced as the official home for Louisville Cardinals athletics. WLCL and WGTK would carry all of the university's football, men's and women's basketball, and baseball games in addition to seasonal football and basketball coaches shows. "Cardinal Insider", a weekday show checking in on news from the teams, which had been heard from 6-7pm weekdays on WKRD, would also move to WLCL, WGTK and Word Media Group's WXVW/W241CK in the nearby Indiana town of Jeffersonville.

The change ended U of L's decades-long partnership with WHAS. However, university officials felt growing chagrin with iHeartMedia frequently preempting Cardinals athletics broadcasts in favor of in-state rivals, the Kentucky Wildcats. Those games were shifted to WKRD, which denied the Cardinals the ability to take full advantage of being on Kentucky's most powerful AM station. Since the launch of the sports format on WLCL, the station had frequently played up its local connection to the school, including using the university's mascot in the station's logo.
