= Beckley, Louisville =

Neighborhood in Louisville, Kentucky

Coordinates: 38°15′06″N 85°28′30″W

Beckley is a neighborhood of Louisville, Kentucky located along North Beckley Station Road and the Chenoweth Run watershed. It is sometimes referred to by its largest subdivision, Lake Forest.
