= Newburg, Louisville =

Neighborhood in Jefferson County, Kentucky, USA

Newburg is a former census-designated place in Jefferson County, Kentucky, United States. The population was 20,636 at the 2000 census. On January 6, 2003, the area was annexed to the city of Louisville due to a merger between the city and Jefferson County's unincorporated communities. Newburg is now thought to be a neighborhood (by local media) within the now merged city of Louisville.

== History ==
The area now called Newburg was settled in the 1820s by four German families, and was a small village called Newburgh a decade later. The 'h' was dropped and the modern spelling emerged as the name of the post office by the end of the 19th century.

Newburg has historically had a black population, once centered on the nearby Petersburg area, at the junction of Shepherdsville and Newburg Roads. By 1851, Eliza and Henry Tevis, a free black couple who owned slaves, operated a 40-acre (160,000 m^{2}) farm in the area. After the Civil War, freed blacks bought land in the area and started farms.

Into the 1900s, Petersburg and Newburg were still surrounded by farmland. Newburg at some point had become the chosen name for the area, most likely because it was the name of the post office. Suburban sprawl reached the area by the 1960s, and it became popular with middle-class blacks leaving the city for suburbs. The area remains predominantly black.

From 1982 to 1987, Newburg was an incorporated city; however, it was an unpopular move and was eventually dissolved.

With the help of the Library Foundation and community support a new $1.9 million, 8300-square-foot education and technology driven library was completed and opened in Newburg in August 2009.

== Geography ==
Newburg is located at 38°10′09″N 85°41′07″W.

According to the United States Census Bureau, the CDP has a total area of 14.9 km^{2} (5.8 sq mi), all land.

== Demographics ==
Historical population
Census	Pop.	Note	%±
1980	24,612		—
1990	21,647		−12.0%
2000	20,636		−4.7%

There was no 2010 census data for Newburg because it had become part of Louisville in 2003.

According to the Courier Journal, 25% of Newburg's population was hispanic as of the 2020 Census.

=== 2000 census ===
Newburg CDP, Kentucky – Racial and ethnic composition Note: the US Census treats Hispanic/Latino as an ethnic category. This table excludes Latinos from the racial categories and assigns them to a separate category. Hispanics/Latinos may be of any race.
Race / Ethnicity (NH = Non-Hispanic)	Pop 2000	% 2000
White alone (NH)	7,577	36.72%
Black or African American alone (NH)	11,917	57.75%
Native American or Alaska Native alone (NH)	45	0.22%
Asian alone (NH)	177	0.86%
Native Hawaiian or Pacific Islander alone (NH)	9	0.04%
Other race alone (NH)	55	0.27%
Mixed race or Multiracial (NH)	296	1.43%
Hispanic or Latino (any race)	560	2.71%
Total	20,636	100.00%

As of the census of 2000, there were 20,636 people, 7,981 households, and 5,506 families residing in the CDP. The population density was 1,388.1 people/km^{2} (3,595 people/mi^{2}). There were 8,449 housing units at an average density of 568.3 units/km^{2} (1,472 units/mi^{2}). The racial makeup of the CDP was 38.15% White, 58.08% African American, 0.27% Native American, 0.87% Asian, 0.05% Pacific Islander, 0.88% from other races, and 1.71% from two or more races. Hispanic or Latino of any race were 2.71% of the population.

There were 7,981 households, out of which 35.0% had children under the age of 18 living with them, 36.3% were married couples living together, 27.4% had a female householder with no husband present, and 31.0% were non-families. 26.3% of all households were made up of individuals, and 6.6% had someone living alone who was 65 years of age or older. The average household size was 2.57 and the average family size was 3.08.

In the CDP, the population was spread out, with 29.7% under the age of 18, 10.1% from 18 to 24, 29.4% from 25 to 44, 20.8% from 45 to 64, and 10.1% who were 65 years of age or older. The median age was 32 years. For every 100 females, there were 85.7 males. For every 100 females age 18 and over, there were 80.2 males.

The median income for a household in the CDP was $29,788, and the median income for a family was $33,996. Males had a median income of $28,682 versus $22,216 for females. The per capita income for the CDP was $14,897. About 16.1% of families and 18.6% of the population were below the poverty line, including 29.4% of those under age 18 and 10.8% of those age 65 or over. 8.5% have a bachelor's degree or higher, 26.1% don't have a high school degree.

== Education ==
Newburg has a lending library, a branch of the Louisville Free Public Library.
