= Okolona, Louisville, Kentucky =

Census-designated place in Kentucky, United States

Okolona is a former census-designated place (CDP) in southern Louisville/Jefferson County, Kentucky, United States. It is centered on the intersection of Preston Highway and the Outer Loop. The population was 17,807 at the 2000 census. When the government of Jefferson County merged with the city of Louisville, Kentucky in 2003, residents of Okolona also became citizens of Louisville Metro. As a result, Okolona is said to be a neighborhood within the city limits of Louisville.

It was first settled by farmers from Pennsylvania and Virginia in the late 18th century. It was called Lone Oak in the late 19th century. However, a town near Paducah, Kentucky already claimed that name for its post office, so the town rearranged the words into Okolona. Farming, as well as logging and charcoal production were important industries around this time.

An interurban line was extended to the area in 1905, but residential development did not pick up until General Electric Appliance Park was opened nearby in 1953.

Okolona sits at exactly the same elevation as Downtown Louisville despite being 10 miles (16 km) from the Ohio River, making it one of the city's most flood prone areas. Several square miles of wetlands had to be drained in the area to make development possible.

== Education ==
In Okolona there are public and private schools;

High school

- Southern High School Magnet Career Academy

Middle school

- T. T. Knight Middle School

Elementary

- Okolona Elementary/
- Blue Lick Elementary/
- Blake Elementary

Private education

- St.Rita Catholic School

== Geography ==
Okolona is located at 38°06′21″N 85°41′06″W.

According to the United States Census Bureau, the CDP has a total area of 17.9 km^{2} (6.9 sq mi), all land.

The zip code for Okolona is 40219 although it partly lies within the 40229 zip code.

== Demographics ==
Historical population
| Census | Pop. | Note | %± |
|---|---|---|---|
| 1970 | 17,643 | | — |
| 1980 | 20,039 | | 13.6% |
| 1990 | 18,902 | | −5.7% |
| 2000 | 17,807 | | −5.8% |

As of the census of 2000, there were 17,807 people, 7,256 households, and 4,955 families residing in the CDP. The population density was 993.5 people /km^{2} (2,573 people/mi^{2}). There were 7,500 housing units at an average density of 418.5 units /km^{2} (1,084 units/mi^{2}). The racial makeup of the CDP was 88.26% White, 7.25% African American, 0.26% Native American, 1.33% Asian, 0.04% Pacific Islander, 1.15% from other races, and 1.71% from two or more races. Hispanic or Latino of any race were 3.18% of the population.

As of the 2020 census, Okolona is 22% Hispanic.

There were 7,256 households, out of which 30.3% had children under the age of 18 living with them, 48.3% were married couples living together, 15.4% had a female householder with no husband present, and 31.7% were non-families. 26.4% of all households were made up of individuals, and 8.9% had someone living alone who was 65 years of age or older. The average household size was 2.43 and the average family size was 2.91.

In the CDP, the population was spread out, with 23.3% under the age of 18, 9.7% from 18 to 24, 30.1% from 25 to 44, 22.8% from 45 to 64, and 14.1% who were 65 years of age or older. The median age was 37 years. For every 100 females, there were 93.3 males. For every 100 females age 18 and over, there were 89.1 males.

The median income for a household in the CDP was $35,950, and the median income for a family was $42,711. Males had a median income of $31,267 versus $24,338 for females. The per capita income for the CDP was $17,639. About 7.4% of families and 9.3% of the population were below the poverty line, including 13.3% of those under age 18 and 3.6% of those age 65 or over.
