= WHBE-FM =

Radio station in Eminence–Louisville, Kentucky

Simulcasting WHBE, Newburg

Eminence, Kentucky; United States
- Broadcast area: Frankfort, Kentucky
- Frequency: 105.7 MHz
- Branding: ESPN Louisville

Programming
- Format: Sports
- Affiliations: ESPN Radio; Cincinnati Reds Radio Network; Indianapolis Colts Radio Network; Louisville Cardinals; Louisville City FC; Racing Louisville FC; Westwood One Sports

Ownership
- Owner: UB Louisville, LLC
- Sister stations: WHBE; WLCL

History
- First air date: 1988 (as WKXF-FM)
- Former call signs: WKXF-FM (1988–1991); WXLN (1991–1991); WXLN-FM (1991–1996); WXLM (1996–2000); WYKY (2000–2001); WTSZ (2001–2002); WTSZ-FM (2002–2006); WTUV-FM (2006–2014)

Technical information
- Licensing authority: FCC
- Facility ID: 42126
- Class: A
- ERP: 3,000 watts
- HAAT: 100 meters (330 ft)
- Transmitter coordinates: 38°21′9.2″N 85°11′8.8″W

Links
- Public license information: Public file; LMS
- Webcast: Listen live
- Website: www.espnlouisville.com

WHBE-FM (105.7 MHz, "ESPN Louisville") is a radio station broadcasting a sports format. Licensed to Eminence, Kentucky, United States, the station serves the Louisville, Kentucky and Frankfort, Kentucky areas. The station is owned by UB Louisville, LLC.

== History ==
The station was assigned the call sign WKXF-FM on May 11, 1988. It became WXLN on June 14, 1991; WXLN-FM on July 2, 1991; WXLM on June 14, 1996; WYKY on April 27, 2000; WTSZ on December 27, 2001; WTSZ-FM on January 4, 2002; WTUV-FM on May 19, 2006; and WHBE-FM on May 2, 2014. The change to WHBE-FM came after the station was sold by Davidson Media Group to UB Louisville, who already owned WHBE (680 AM).
