= WXVW =

Radio station in Jeffersonville, Indiana

- Jeffersonville, Indiana; United States
- Broadcast area: Louisville, Kentucky
- Frequency: 1450 kHz
- Branding: Big X Sports Radio

Programming
- Format: Sports
- Affiliations: Westwood One Sports; SportsMap; Indiana Pacers; Indianapolis Colts

Ownership
- Owner: Word Media Group; (Word Broadcasting Network, Inc.)
- Sister stations: WBNA; WBNM-LD; WFIA; WGTK; WLGK; WJIE-FM

History
- First air date: September 16, 1961
- Former call signs: WXVW (1961–1997); WAVG (1997–2008); WQKC (2008–2013)

Technical information
- Licensing authority: FCC
- Facility ID: 63935
- Class: C
- Power: 1,000 watts
- Transmitter coordinates: 38°17′41″N 85°45′7″W
- Translator: 96.1 W241CK (Jeffersonville)

Links
- Public license information: Public file; LMS
- Webcast: Listen live
- Website: bigxsportsradio.com

WXVW (1450 AM) is a radio station licensed to Jeffersonville, Indiana, serving the Louisville, Kentucky, area. The station is owned by Word Broadcasting Network, Inc.

== History ==
For much of the 1970s and 1980s, WXVW originally ran an adult standards music format. The station originally broadcasts Chicago Cubs baseball games during its early days.

Under ownership of Cumulus Media, WXVW formerly simulcast sports formatted WQKC (93.9 FM) as "The Ticket", until that station changed to a classic hits music format as WLCL on November 20, 2008.

On August 2, 2010, WQKC and WLCL went silent after Cumulus decided to cease operations in the Louisville market.

On October 3, 2011, WQKC returned to the air, again with sports, branded as "The Sports Buzz". Cumulus would formally sell the station to its programmer, Ryan Media, in November 2011.

On May 21, 2013, WQKC changed its call sign back to WXVW, which was the station's original call letters from its original sign on date (September 16, 1961–same as WLKY-TV) until 1997, when the call sign changed to WAVG.

Effective December 1, 2020, Ryan Media sold WXVW and translator W241CK to Word Broadcasting Network, Inc.
