= WBNA =

Television station in Louisville, Kentucky

- Louisville, Kentucky; United States
- Channels: Digital: 8 (VHF); Virtual: 21
- Branding: WBNA 21

Programming
- Affiliations: 21.1: Independent; for others, see § Subchannels

Ownership
- Owner: Evangel World Prayer Center; (Word Broadcasting Network, Inc.)
- Sister stations: W25GD-D

History
- First air date: April 2, 1986
- Former channel number: Analog: 21 (UHF, 1986–2009)
- Former affiliations: Religious Ind. (1986–1995); The WB (1995–1999); Pax/i/Ion (1999–2017)
- Call sign meaning: Word Broadcasting Network Association

Technical information
- Licensing authority: FCC
- Facility ID: 73692
- ERP: 27 kW; 95 kW (CP)
- HAAT: 200 m (656 ft)
- Transmitter coordinates: 38°1′59″N 85°45′17″W

Links
- Public license information: Public file; LMS
- Website: www.wbna21.com

WBNA (channel 21) is an independent television station in Louisville, Kentucky, United States, owned by local charismatic megachurch Evangel World Prayer Center. The station's offices are located on Fern Valley Road (just north of State Route 1747) in Okolona, and its transmitter is located off Oakcrest Drive in Shepherdsville. As such, WBNA is the only full-power television station in the Louisville market whose transmitter facilities are not based at the Kentuckiana tower farm in Floyds Knobs, Indiana.

== History ==
The station's construction permit was granted by the Federal Communications Commission (FCC) in 1978. Bob Rodgers, the station's president and the management of the station, associated with a 6,000-member Evangel Tabernacle congregation, intended for the station to go on the air on Christmas Day 1985, but technical problems with the transmission antenna prevented that from happening. After seven years of construction and technical errors, WBNA finally signed on the air on April 2, 1986, as the second full-power independent station in the Louisville market. Rodgers gave credit to Louisville engineer Clarance Henson for helping guide the church through the whole process of finally getting switched on. (Note: Henson remained associated with the station through the 1990s.) WBNA's sign-on marked the first signal on analog channel 21 in Louisville since the demise of WKLO-TV, which operated as a dual ABC/DuMont affiliate from October 1953 through April 1954.

WBNA originally offered mostly local and national religious programming. Broadcasting this programming format did not come without risks as Christian-oriented television became a depressed market due to recent scandals involving televangelists. Thus, by 1988, the station developed a schedule that is more typical of a general entertainment independent station, which included family-oriented programs, movies, and some programming from shopping networks. However, televised local church services remained on the schedule.

When WDRB (channel 41) joined Fox eleven months later in May 1987, WBNA became the only independent in Louisville until WFTE (channel 58, now WBKI) signed on in March 1994; when that station joined UPN in 1995, WBNA once again became Louisville's sole independent station.

The station became a charter affiliate of The WB when the network launched on January 11, 1995. However, Evangel felt chagrin at The WB's decision to pick up several programs that it believed offended the sensibilities of channel 21's mostly fundamentalist and Pentecostal viewership, such as nighttime soap Savannah, supernatural dramas Charmed and Buffy the Vampire Slayer and sitcom Unhappily Ever After. WBNA opted to preempt these programs and fill these timeslots with syndicated or religious programming. These shows were seen in the Louisville market via WGN-TV's national feed during this time period. The WB soon regretted aligning with a conservative religious station, and began making plans to move its programming elsewhere. In 1998, Campbellsville-based WGRB (channel 34, later the original WBKI-TV), which had been serving as the WB affiliate for the southern portion of the Louisville market for just over a year, became the market's primary WB affiliate. At the same time, it announced plans to build a new transmitter tower (which was activated in 2000) that would not only improve its coverage within Louisville itself and some adjacent areas, but give it at least grade B signal coverage in most of Kentucky. WBNA became an affiliate of the family-oriented network Pax TV—later i: Independent Television and now Ion Television—in September 1999.

WBNA was one of the few stations that carried programming from Ion Television as an affiliate of the network, instead of being an owned-and-operated station. It was the largest Ion Television station by market size that is not owned by network parent Ion Media Networks. In addition, the station is licensed to Louisville proper rather than an outer-ring suburb, as is the usual case with Ion stations. Due to Evangel's commitment to the network, WBNA was free to carry additional networks on its digital signal's bandwidth (as described below) rather than being beholden to carrying all of the five networks (Ion, Qubo, Ion Life, infomercial service Ion Shop, QVC and the Home Shopping Network) that were carried on Ion-owned stations.

WBNA did not carry the full Ion schedule, and had not cleared additional broadcast hours that have been added by the network since 2008 (the network currently airs general entertainment programming daily from 7 a.m. to 3 a.m. in the Eastern Time Zone; however, religious and secular programs preempted much of the network's daytime schedule on WBNA). During the early evening hours, the station also aired a rebroadcast of Lexington NBC affiliate WLEX-TV's 6 p.m. newscast and other local programs (also in lieu of Ion's entertainment programming in the 7 p.m. hour). The station also split the network's Qubo block (which counts towards FCC E/I requirements) over two days; one half-hour of the block aired on Friday mornings in its recommended timeslot, while two additional 90-minute blocks aired respectively on Saturday mornings and afternoons on a tape delay.

From 2013 to 2017, WBNA's main channel was relayed on translator station WBNM-LD (now W25GD-D).

In February 2017, WBNA dropped its affiliation with Ion to once again become an independent station. Ion programming began airing on a digital subchannel of Fox affiliate WDRB on March 1.

== Sports programming ==
WBNA broadcasts college basketball games involving the Western Kentucky Hilltoppers and Lady Toppers, originating from the Bowling Green–based Hilltopper Sports Network's television division. On March 9, 2017, it was announced that WBNA would become the primary broadcaster of Louisville City FC's matches in the 2017 USL season.

The station serves as the flagship station for Ohio Valley Wrestling (OVW), which brokers its time and produces the broadcasts originating on WBNA.

== Technical information ==
=== Subchannels ===
The station's signal is multiplexed:

Subchannels of WBNA
Subchannel	Res.	Short name	Programming
21.1	720p	WBNA-DT	Main WBNA programming
21.2	480i	StartTV	Start TV
21.3	480i	MovieSp	MovieSphere Gold
21.4	480i	BIG4	Local programming
21.5	480i	CBN New	CBN News
21.6	480i	H&I	Heroes & Icons
21.7	480i	TOONS	MeTV Toons
21.8	480i	AVoice	Real America's Voice
21.9	480i	Estrell	Shop LC
21.10	480i	Buzzer	Buzzr
21.12	480i	WJIE	simulcast of WJIE-FM

Daystar programming was previously carried on WBNA during overnight and some daytime timeslots, in place of Ion's paid programming and programs such as the weekend Knife Show home shopping block. Some of Ion's late night programming (past 11 p.m.) was carried on the Retro Television Network subchannel, while the main WBNA channel carried overnight religious programming.

Qubo was available on the fifth subchannel of WBNA. This made it one of the few stations not owned by Ion Media to carry the network.

In late July 2009, WBNA replaced the Ion-provided feed of The Worship Network on digital subchannel 21.4 with the Retro Television Network. In October 2009, WBNA launched "The Light" on a sixth digital subchannel; the locally programmed service aired a mix of local church services and other worship programming, originally intermixed within the Daystar schedule, especially during time periods in which Daystar programming aired over the station's main channel.

Several changes occurred in late April 2011 in order to accommodate technical upgrades to transmit the station's main channel in 720p high definition: WBNA dropped Daystar and Ion Life, as well as their respective subchannel slots on 21.5 and 21.6; it also began carrying GOD TV programming over "The Light" and integrating the service onto digital channel 21.3. GOD TV and "The Light" programming now airs on WBNA's main channel during timeslots where Daystar programming previously aired, while in some early afternoon periods, the main channel carried RTV programming, which was eventually replaced with the rebroadcast of WAVE's midday newscast and Debmar-Mercury–distributed syndicated programs.

=== Analog-to-digital conversion ===
WBNA ended regular programming on its analog signal, over UHF channel 21, on June 12, 2009, the official date on which full-power television stations in the United States transitioned from analog to digital broadcasts under federal mandate. The station's digital signal remained on its pre-transition VHF channel 8, using virtual channel 21. Channel 8, however, has been problematic for many digital TV stations. WBNA's lower power signal and shorter antenna tower in Bullitt County, Kentucky (shorter due to its relative position to the approaches to the two NNE-SSW runways at Louisville International Airport), delivers a much weaker city signal than the other full-power DTVs (and many low-power and Class A stations), which transmit from the 900-foot (274 m) bluffs of Floyds Knobs, Indiana. WBNA is only one of two Louisville television stations that broadcasts its post-transition digital signal on the VHF band, along with WHAS-TV (channel 11).

As part of the SAFER Act, WBNA kept its analog signal on the air until June 26 to inform viewers of the digital television transition through a loop of public service announcements from the National Association of Broadcasters.
