= Alpha Media =

American radio broadcasting company

Alpha Media LLC
- Trade name: Alpha Media
- Industry: Mass media
- Genre: Radio broadcasting
- Predecessor: Alpha Broadcasting; L&L Broadcasting LLC; Main Line Broadcasting; Triad Broadcasting
- Founded: 2009; 17 years ago
- Founder: Lawrence R. "Larry" Wilson
- Defunct: September 4, 2025; 14 months ago
- Successor: Connoisseur Media
- Headquarters: Portland, Oregon, United States
- Number of locations: 135
- Key people: Larry Wilson (Chairman); Bob Proffitt (President/CEO); Donna Heffner (CFO)
- Website: www.alphamediausa.com

Alpha Media LLC was a radio broadcasting company based in Portland, Oregon, and led by Bob Proffitt. The group did business under the Alpha Media name.

It was formed from the merger of Alpha Broadcasting, L&L Broadcasting, and Main Line Broadcasting on July 1, 2014. At its formation, it owned 68 radio stations in 12 markets, along with two theatres (in Portland and San Antonio) and a digital marketing firm in Peoria, Illinois.

== Alpha Broadcasting ==
Alpha Broadcasting was founded in 2009 in Portland, Oregon by Larry Wilson, arising from the sale of stations formerly a part of the CBS Radio Portland cluster with those of Rose City Radio.

On April 17, 2014, L&L Broadcasting announced that it has agreed to merge with Alpha, while purchasing the stations of Main Line Broadcasting. The combined entity became known as Alpha Media.

== L&L Broadcasting ==
The broadcasting group was sometimes referred to as Live and Local.

L&L was formed in 2012 to buy all but two of the radio stations of Triad Broadcasting for $21 million; the deal, involving 32 stations in 5 radio markets, closed in May 2013, and transfer was finalized in June 2013. L&L immediately arranged for the 6 stations in the Fargo, North Dakota market to be sold to Jim Ingstad.

In August 2013, L&L arranged to buy, from YMF Media (Yucaipa Companies and Earvin "Magic" Johnson), the six stations formerly owned by Inner City Broadcasting in the Jackson, Mississippi radio market.

In September, 2013, L&L definitively agreed to purchase an additional 5 stations in Columbia, South Carolina from YMF Media.

On April 17, 2014, L&L Broadcasting announced that it has agreed to merge with Alpha Broadcasting, while purchasing the stations of Main Line Broadcasting.

== Post-merger changes ==
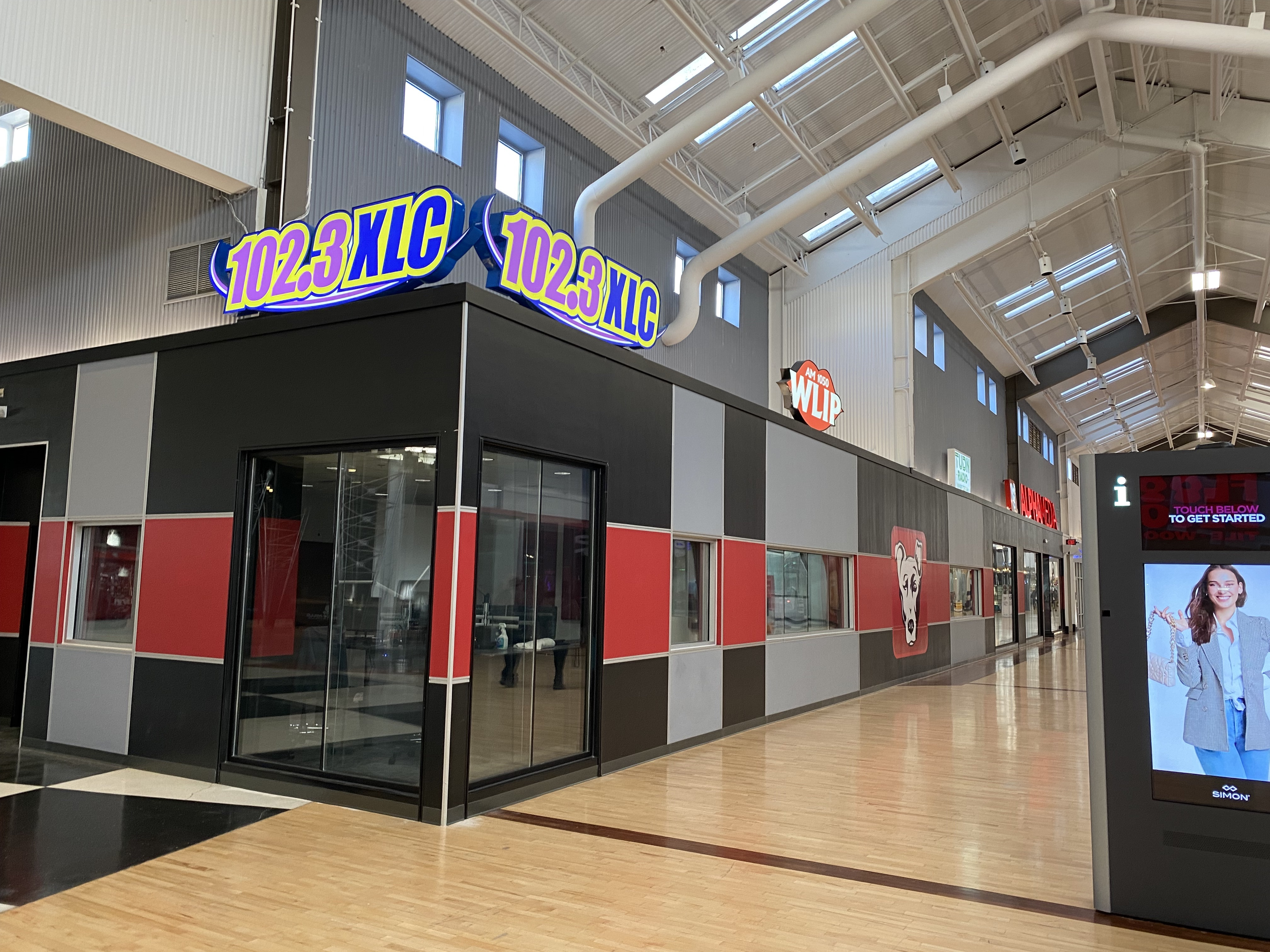
The Gurnee Mills studios of Alpha Media's stations serving Kenosha, Wisconsin and the North Shore suburbs of Chicago.

On October 10, 2014, Alpha Media announced that it will be purchasing the remaining stations owned by Buckley Broadcasting in Bakersfield and Merced, California. These were the last stations remaining to be divested by Buckley, which had begun to sell off its radio assets in 2008. The purchase of the Buckley stations was consummated on December 31, 2014, at a price of $5.8 million.

On January 1, 2015, Alpha Media began an LMA on the Access.1 stations in Shreveport, Louisiana and Tyler/Longview, Texas. The purchase was consummated on April 14, 2015, at a price of $13.75 million. Effective February 1, 2017 Alpha transferred control of KFRO to a new owner, and returned operation of KCUL-FM, and KSYR to Access.1.

Effective May 1, 2015, Alpha Media acquired four stations and a translator in the Fredericksburg, Virginia market from The Free Lance-Star, at a price of $8.1 million.

On August 17, 2015, Alpha Media announced it was purchasing Palm Springs, California radio stations KDES-FM and KPSI-FM ("Mix 100.5"). While the purchase price was not originally announced, the transaction was consummated on December 29, 2015 at a price of $3 million.

On February 25, 2016, Alpha Media acquired Digity, LLC for $264 million, adding 116 stations in 26 markets to its portfolio for a total of 251.

In September 2017, Alpha Media announced that it would sell its clusters in Savannah, Kinston/New Bern/Jacksonville, and Myrtle Beach, to Dick Broadcasting Corporation for $19.5 million. Dick assumed control of the stations under local marketing agreements shortly afterward. However, the sale of the Savannah, Georgia stations will not be filed with the FCC until August 2019, with Dick operating them under an LMA for the time being. The sale, at a price of $5,000,000, was consummated on December 1, 2022.

On January 24, 2021, Alpha Media filed for Chapter 11 bankruptcy protection, blaming several factors caused by the COVID-19 pandemic as part of the decision. The company had plans to shed most of its debt and restructure agreements with its lenders.

Starting in May 2024, Alpha Media began laying off on-air personalities in several of its markets, starting with a round of cuts at stations in Farmington/Festus and Moberly, Missouri. Later in the month, stations in Minnesota, Iowa and South Dakota were also targeted for layoffs of on-air personnel. A social media post by a former on-air personality at one of the affected stations in Brookings, South Dakota, stated that the Alpha Media stations where the former personalities were employed "would be switching from local programming to national syndication." Another described this as "destroying anything that is unique and of value for local listeners and instead providing things they can already get from many other sources."

In May 2025, Connoisseur Media announced its intent to acquire Alpha Media. The FCC approved the sale on August 13, 2025, and the sale was consummated on September 4.

== Theatres ==
Alpha Media owned the Skype Live Studio (formerly known as The Bing Lounge) in Portland and The Alamo Lounge in San Antonio, Texas.

== Former station list ==
=== Divestments after the sale ===
Callsign	Freq.	City	Market	Transferred	From	Notes
WWDM	101.3 MHz	Sumter, SC	Columbia, SC	November 27, 2013	YMF	
WHXT	103.9 MHz	Orangeburg, SC	Columbia, SC	November 27, 2013	YMF	
WMFX	102.3 MHz	Saint Andrews, SC	Columbia, SC	November 27, 2013	YMF	
WARQ	93.5 MHz	Columbia, SC	Columbia, SC	November 27, 2013	YMF	
WJNT	1180 kHz	Pearl, MS	Jackson, MS	September 24, 2013	YMF	Also has booster FM station at 103.3 MHz
WOAD	1300 kHz	Jackson, MS	Jackson, MS	September 24, 2013	YMF	
WJQS	1400 kHz	Jackson, MS	Jackson, MS	September 24, 2013	YMF	
WJMI	99.7 MHz	Jackson, MS	Jackson, MS	September 24, 2013	YMF	
WRKS	105.9 MHz	Pickens, MS	Jackson, MS	September 24, 2013	YMF	
WKXI-FM	107.5 MHz	Magee, MS	Jackson, MS	September 24, 2013	YMF	
KJXK	102.7 MHz	San Antonio, TX	San Antonio, TX	January 2014	BMP Radio	
KTSA	550 kHz	San Antonio, TX	San Antonio, TX	January 2014	BMP Radio	
KZDC	1250 kHz	San Antonio, TX	San Antonio, TX	January 2014	BMP Radio	
KSAH	720 kHz	Universal City, TX	San Antonio, TX	January 2014	BMP Radio	
KSAH-FM	104.1 MHz	Pearsall, TX	San Antonio, TX	January 2014	BMP Radio	
KLEY-FM	95.7 MHz	Jourdanton, TX	San Antonio, TX	January 2014	BMP Radio	
KTFM	94.1 MHz	Floresville, TX	San Antonio, TX	January 2014	BMP Radio	
WGZB-FM	96.5 MHz	Lanesville, IN	Louisville, KY	July 1, 2014	Main Line	
WDJX	99.7 MHz	Louisville, KY	Louisville, KY	July 1, 2014	Main Line	
WMJM	101.3 MHz	Jeffersontown, KY	Louisville, KY	July 1, 2014	Main Line	
WXMA	102.3 MHz	Louisville, KY	Louisville, KY	July 1, 2014	Main Line	
WGHL	105.1 MHz	Shepherdsville, KY	Louisville, KY	July 1, 2014	Main Line	
WROU-FM	92.1 MHz	West Carrollton, OH	Dayton, OH	July 1, 2014	Main Line	
WGTZ	92.9 MHz	Eaton, OH	Dayton, OH	July 1, 2014	Main Line	
WCLI-FM	101.5 MHz	Enon, OH	Dayton, OH	July 1, 2014	Main Line	
WDHT	102.9 MHz	Urbana, OH	Dayton, OH	July 1, 2014	Main Line	
WING	1410 kHz	Dayton, OH	Dayton, OH	July 1, 2014	Main Line	
WQCM	94.3 MHz	Greencastle, PA	Hagerstown, MD-Chambersburg, PA	July 1, 2014	Main Line	
WIKZ	95.1 MHz	Chambersburg, PA	Hagerstown, MD-Chambersburg, PA	July 1, 2014	Main Line	
WDLD	96.7 MHz	Halfway, MD	Hagerstown, MD-Chambersburg, PA	July 1, 2014	Main Line	
WCHA	800 kHz	Chambersburg, PA	Hagerstown, MD-Chambersburg, PA	July 1, 2014	Main Line	
WHAG	1410 kHz	Halfway, MD	Hagerstown, MD-Chambersburg, PA	July 1, 2014	Main Line	
KUPL	98.7 MHz	Portland, OR	Portland, OR	July 1, 2014	Alpha	
KBFF	95.5 MHz	Portland, OR	Portland, OR	July 1, 2014	Alpha	
KXL-FM	101.1 MHz	Portland, OR	Portland, OR	July 1, 2014	Alpha	
KINK	101.9 MHz	Portland, OR	Portland, OR	July 1, 2014	Alpha	
KXTG	750 kHz	Portland, OR	Portland, OR	July 1, 2014	Alpha	
KUFO	970 kHz	Portland, OR	Portland, OR	July 1, 2014	Alpha	
KLLY	95.3 MHz	Oildale, CA	Bakersfield, CA	December 31, 2014	Buckley	
KKBB	99.3 MHz	Bakersfield, CA	Bakersfield, CA	December 31, 2014	Buckley	
KNZR	1560 kHz	Bakersfield, CA	Bakersfield, CA	December 31, 2014	Buckley	
KNZR-FM	97.7 MHz	Shafter, CA	Bakersfield, CA	December 31, 2014	Buckley	
KBTT	103.7 MHz	Haughton, LA	Shreveport, LA	April 14, 2015	Access.1 Communications Corp.	
KDKS-FM	102.1 MHz	Blanchard, LA	Shreveport, LA	April 14, 2015	Access.1 Communications Corp.	
KLKL	95.7 MHz	Minden, LA	Shreveport, LA	April 14, 2015	Access.1 Communications Corp.	
KOKA	980 kHz	Shreveport, LA	Shreveport, LA	April 14, 2015	Access.1 Communications Corp.	
KTAL-FM	98.1 MHz	Texarkana, TX	Shreveport, LA	April 14, 2015	Access.1 Communications Corp.	
KKUS	104.1 MHz	Tyler, TX	Tyler, TX	April 14, 2015	Access.1 Communications Corp.	
KOOI	106.5 MHz	Jacksonville, TX	Tyler, TX	April 14, 2015	Access.1 Communications Corp.	
KOYE	96.7 MHz	Frankston, TX	Tyler, TX	April 14, 2015	Access.1 Communications Corp.	
KYKX	105.7 MHz	Longview, TX	Tyler, TX	April 14, 2015	Access.1 Communications Corp.	
KKDV	92.1 MHz	Walnut Creek, CA	San Francisco, CA	May 1, 2015	Coast Radio Group	
KKIQ	101.7 MHz	Livermore, CA	San Francisco, CA	May 1, 2015	Coast Radio Group	
KUIC	95.3 MHz	Vacaville, CA	San Francisco, CA	May 1, 2015	Coast Radio Group	
WFLS-FM	93.3 MHz	Fredericksburg, VA	Fredericksburg, VA	May 1, 2015	Free Lance-Star License, Inc.	
WNTX	1350 kHz	Fredericksburg, VA	Fredericksburg, VA	May 1, 2015	Free Lance-Star License, Inc.	
WVBX	99.3 MHz	Spotsylvania, VA	Fredericksburg, VA	May 1, 2015	Free Lance-Star License, Inc.	
WWUZ	96.9 MHz	Bowling Green, VA	Fredericksburg, VA	May 1, 2015	Free Lance-Star License, Inc.	
KONE	101.1 MHz	Lubbock, TX	Lubbock, TX	May 15, 2015	Wilks Broadcast Group	
KLLL-FM	96.3 MHz	Lubbock, TX	Lubbock, TX	May 15, 2015	Wilks Broadcast Group	
KBTE	104.9 MHz	Tulia, TX	Lubbock, TX	May 15, 2015	Wilks Broadcast Group	
KMMX	100.3 MHz	Tahoka, TX	Lubbock, TX	May 15, 2015	Wilks Broadcast Group	
KBMG	106.3 MHz	Evanston, WY	Salt Lake City, UT	July 16, 2015	Adelante Media Group	
KDUT	102.3 MHz	Randolph, UT	Salt Lake City, UT	July 16, 2015	Adelante Media Group	
KTUB	1600 kHz	Centerville, UT	Salt Lake City, UT	July 16, 2015	Adelante Media Group	
KBRJ	104.1 MHz	Anchorage, AK	Anchorage, AK	September 1, 2015	Morris Communications	
KEAG	97.3 MHz	Anchorage, AK	Anchorage, AK	September 1, 2015	Morris Communications	
KFQD	750 kHz	Anchorage, AK	Anchorage, AK	September 1, 2015	Morris Communications	
KHAR	590 kHz	Anchorage, AK	Anchorage, AK	September 1, 2015	Morris Communications	
KMXS	103.1 MHz	Anchorage, AK	Anchorage, AK	September 1, 2015	Morris Communications	
KWHL	106.5 MHz	Anchorage, AK	Anchorage, AK	September 1, 2015	Morris Communications	
KAYO	100.9 MHz	Wasilla, AK	Wasilla, AK	September 1, 2015	Morris Communications	
KCLB-FM	93.7 MHz	Coachella, CA	Palm Springs, CA	September 1, 2015	Morris Communications	
KCLZ	95.5 MHz	Twentynine Palms, CA	Palm Springs, CA	September 1, 2015	Morris Communications	
KKUU	92.7 MHz	Palm Springs, CA	Palm Springs, CA	September 1, 2015	Morris Communications	
KNWQ	1140 kHz	Palm Springs, CA	Palm Springs, CA	September 1, 2015	Morris Communications	
KNWZ	970 kHz	Coachella, CA	Palm Springs, CA	September 1, 2015	Morris Communications	
KDGL	106.9 MHz	Yucca Valley, CA	Victor Valley, CA	September 1, 2015	Morris Communications	
KNWH	970 kHz	Yucca Valley, CA	Victor Valley, CA	September 1, 2015	Morris Communications	
KSAJ-FM	98.5 MHz	Burlingame, KS	Topeka, KS	September 1, 2015	Morris Communications	
WIBW	580 kHz	Topeka, KS	Topeka, KS	September 1, 2015	Morris Communications	
WIBW-FM	94.5 MHz	Topeka, KS	Topeka, KS	September 1, 2015	Morris Communications	
KGNC	710 kHz	Amarillo, TX	Amarillo, TX	September 1, 2015	Morris Communications	
KGNC-FM	97.9 MHz	Amarillo, TX	Amarillo, TX	September 1, 2015	Morris Communications	
KXRO	1320 kHz	Aberdeen, WA	Hoquiam, WA	September 1, 2015	Morris Communications	
KWOK	1490 kHz	Aberdeen, WA	Hoquiam, WA	September 1, 2015	Morris Communications	
KXXK	95.3 MHz	Hoquiam, WA	Hoquiam, WA	September 1, 2015	Morris Communications	
KDUX-FM	104.7 MHz	Hoquiam, WA	Hoquiam, WA	September 1, 2015	Morris Communications	
KWIQ	1020 kHz	Moses Lake North, WA	Wenatchee, WA	September 1, 2015	Morris Communications	
KWIQ-FM	100.5 MHz	Moses Lake, WA	Wenatchee, WA	September 1, 2015	Morris Communications	
KKRV	104.7 MHz	Wenatchee, WA	Wenatchee, WA	September 1, 2015	Morris Communications	
KKRT	900 kHz	Wenatchee, WA	Wenatchee, WA	September 1, 2015	Morris Communications	
KWLN	103.3 MHz	Wilson Creek, WA	Wenatchee, WA	September 1, 2015	Morris Communications	
KTPK	106.9 MHz	Topeka, KS	Topeka, KS	September 1, 2015	JMJ Broadcasting Company, Inc.	
KXGL	100.9 MHz	Amarillo, TX	Amarillo, TX	September 1, 2015	JMJ Broadcasting Company, Inc.	
WSCZ	93.9 MHz	Winnsboro, SC	Columbia, SC	November 30, 2015	Miller Communications	
KDES-FM	98.5 MHz	Cathedral City, CA	Palm Springs, CA	December 29, 2015	Glen Barnett, Inc.	
KPSI-FM	100.5 MHz	Palm Springs, CA	Palm Springs, CA	December 29, 2015	R & R Radio Corporation	
KBAY	94.5 MHz	Gilroy, CA	San Francisco Bay Area	February 25, 2016	Digity, LLC	
KEZR	106.5 MHz	San Jose, CA	San Francisco Bay Area	February 25, 2016	Digity, LLC	
KKFD-FM	95.9 MHz	Fairfield, IA	Fairfield, IA	February 25, 2016	Digity, LLC	
KMCD	1570 kHz	Fairfield, IA	Fairfield, IA	February 25, 2016	Digity, LLC	
KIAQ	96.9 MHz	Clarion, IA	Fort Dodge, IA	February 25, 2016	Digity, LLC	
KKEZ	94.5 MHz	Fort Dodge, IA	Fort Dodge, IA	February 25, 2016	Digity, LLC	
KTLB	105.9 MHz	Twin Lakes, IA	Fort Dodge, IA	February 25, 2016	Digity, LLC	
KVFD	1400 kHz	Fort Dodge, IA	Fort Dodge, IA	February 25, 2016	Digity, LLC	
KWMT	540 kHz	Fort Dodge, IA	Fort Dodge, IA	February 25, 2016	Digity, LLC	
KXFT	99.7 MHz	Manson, IA	Fort Dodge, IA	February 25, 2016	Digity, LLC	
KZLB	92.1 MHz	Fort Dodge, IA	Fort Dodge, IA	February 25, 2016	Digity, LLC	
KGRN	1410 kHz	Grinnell, IA	Grinnell, IA	February 25, 2016	Digity, LLC	
KRTI	106.7 MHz	Grinnell, IA	Newton, IA	February 25, 2016	Digity, LLC	
KGLO	1300 kHz	Mason City, IA	Mason City, IA	February 25, 2016	Digity, LLC	
KIAI	93.9 MHz	Mason City, IA	Mason City, IA	February 25, 2016	Digity, LLC	
KLSS-FM	106.1 MHz	Mason City, IA	Mason City, IA	February 25, 2016	Digity, LLC	
KRIB	1490 kHz	Mason City, IA	Mason City, IA	February 25, 2016	Digity, LLC	
KYTC	102.7 MHz	Northwood, IA	Mason City, IA	February 25, 2016	Digity, LLC	
KCOB	1280 kHz	Newton, IA	Newton, IA	February 25, 2016	Digity, LLC	
KCOB-FM	95.9 MHz	Newton, IA	Newton, IA	February 25, 2016	Digity, LLC	
WCCQ	98.3 MHz	Crest Hill, IL	Chicago, IL	February 25, 2016	Digity, LLC	
WERV-FM	95.9 MHz	Aurora, IL	Chicago, IL	February 25, 2016	Digity, LLC	
WJOL	1340 kHz	Joliet, IL	Chicago, IL	February 25, 2016	Digity, LLC	
WKRS	1220 kHz	Waukegan, IL	Chicago, IL	February 25, 2016	Digity, LLC	
WSSR	96.7 MHz	Joliet, IL	Chicago, IL	February 25, 2016	Digity, LLC	
WXLC	102.3 MHz	Waukegan, IL	Chicago, IL	February 25, 2016	Digity, LLC	
WCEN-FM	94.5 MHz	Hemlock, MI	Tri-Cities, MI	February 25, 2016	Digity, LLC	
WGER	106.3 MHz	Saginaw, MI	Tri-Cities, MI	February 25, 2016	Digity, LLC	
WSGW	790 kHz	Saginaw, MI	Tri-Cities, MI	February 25, 2016	Digity, LLC	
WSGW-FM	100.5 MHz	Carrollton, MI	Tri-Cities, MI	February 25, 2016	Digity, LLC	
WTLZ	107.1 MHz	Saginaw, MI	Tri-Cities, MI	February 25, 2016	Digity, LLC	
KATE	1450 kHz	Albert Lea, MN	Albert Lea, MN	February 25, 2016	Digity, LLC	
KCPI	94.9 MHz	Albert Lea, MN	Albert Lea, MN	February 25, 2016	Digity, LLC	
KAUS-FM	99.9 MHz	Austin, MN	Austin, MN	February 25, 2016	Digity, LLC	
KLQL	101.1 MHz	Luverne, MN	Luverne, MN	February 25, 2016	Digity, LLC	
KQAD	800 kHz	Luverne, MN	Luverne, MN	February 25, 2016	Digity, LLC	
KEEZ-FM	99.1 MHz	Mankato, MN	Mankato, MN	February 25, 2016	Digity, LLC	
KMKO-FM	95.7 MHz	Lake Crystal, MN	Mankato, MN	February 25, 2016	Digity, LLC	
KRBI-FM	105.5 MHz	St. Peter, MN	Mankato, MN	February 25, 2016	Digity, LLC	
KYSM-FM	103.5 MHz	Mankato, MN	Mankato, MN	February 25, 2016	Digity, LLC	
KAUS	1480 kHz	Austin, MN	Mower County, MN	February 25, 2016	Digity, LLC	
KLGR	1490 kHz	Redwood Falls, MN	Redwood Falls, MN	February 25, 2016	Digity, LLC	
KLGR-FM	97.7 MHz	Redwood Falls, MN	Redwood Falls, MN	February 25, 2016	Digity, LLC	
KAAN	870 kHz	Bethany, MO	Bethany, MO	February 25, 2016	Digity, LLC	
KAAN-FM	95.5 MHz	Bethany, MO	Bethany, MO	February 25, 2016	Digity, LLC	
KWIX-FM	92.5 MHz	Cairo, MO	Cairo, MO	February 25, 2016	Digity, LLC	
KRES	104.7 MHz	Moberly, MO	Columbia, MO	February 25, 2016	Digity, LLC	
KWIX	1230 kHz	Moberly, MO	Columbia, MO	February 25, 2016	Digity, LLC	
KREI	800 kHz	Farmington, MO	Farmington, MO	February 25, 2016	Digity, LLC	
KJFF	1400 kHz	Festus, MO	Jefferson County, MO	February 25, 2016	Digity, LLC	
KKWK	100.1 MHz	Cameron, MO	Kansas City, MO	February 25, 2016	Digity, LLC	
KMRN	1360 kHz	Cameron, MO	Kansas City, MO	February 25, 2016	Digity, LLC	
KIRK	99.9 MHz	Macon, MO	Moberly, MO	February 25, 2016	Digity, LLC	
KTCM	97.3 MHz	Madison, MO	Moberly, MO	February 25, 2016	Digity, LLC	
KBNN	750 kHz	Lebanon, MO	Springfield, MO	February 25, 2016	Digity, LLC	
KJEL	103.7 MHz	Lebanon, MO	Springfield, MO	February 25, 2016	Digity, LLC	
KTJJ	98.5 MHz	Farmington, MO	St. Louis, MO	February 25, 2016	Digity, LLC	
KFBD-FM	97.9 MHz	Waynesville, MO	Waynesville, MO	February 25, 2016	Digity, LLC	
KIIK	1270 kHz	Waynesville, MO	Waynesville, MO	February 25, 2016	Digity, LLC	
KJPW	1390 kHz	Waynesville, MO	Waynesville, MO	February 25, 2016	Digity, LLC	
KOZQ-FM	102.3 MHz	Waynesville, MO	Waynesville, MO	February 25, 2016	Digity, LLC	
KJSK	900 kHz	Columbus, NE	Columbus, NE	February 25, 2016	Digity, LLC	
KKOT	93.5 MHz	Columbus, NE	Columbus, NE	February 25, 2016	Digity, LLC	
KLIR	101.1 MHz	Columbus, NE	Columbus, NE	February 25, 2016	Digity, LLC	
KTTT	1510 kHz	Columbus, NE	Columbus, NE	February 25, 2016	Digity, LLC	
KZEN	100.3 MHz	Columbus, NE	Columbus, NE	February 25, 2016	Digity, LLC	
KFOR	1240 kHz	Lincoln, NE	Lincoln, NE	February 25, 2016	Digity, LLC	
KFRX	106.3 MHz	Lincoln, NE	Lincoln, NE	February 25, 2016	Digity, LLC	
KIBZ	104.1 MHz	Crete, NE	Lincoln, NE	February 25, 2016	Digity, LLC	
KLMS	1480 kHz	Lincoln, NE	Lincoln, NE	February 25, 2016	Digity, LLC	
KTGL	92.9 MHz	Beatrice, NE	Lincoln, NE	February 25, 2016	Digity, LLC	
KZKX	96.9 MHz	Seward, NE	Lincoln, NE	February 25, 2016	Digity, LLC	
WHBC	1480 kHz	Canton, OH	Canton, OH	February 25, 2016	Digity, LLC	
WHBC-FM	94.1 MHz	Canton, OH	Canton, OH	February 25, 2016	Digity, LLC	
KBRK	1430 kHz	Brookings, SD	Brookings, SD	February 25, 2016	Digity, LLC	
KBRK-FM	93.7 MHz	Brookings, SD	Brookings, SD	February 25, 2016	Digity, LLC	
KDBX	107.1 MHz	Clear Lake, SD	Brookings, SD	February 25, 2016	Digity, LLC	
KJJQ	910 kHz	Volga, SD	Brookings, SD	February 25, 2016	Digity, LLC	
KJAM	1390 kHz	Madison, SD	Madison, SD	February 25, 2016	Digity, LLC	
KJAM-FM	103.1 MHz	Madison, SD	Madison, SD	February 25, 2016	Digity, LLC	
KDLO-FM	96.9 MHz	Watertown, SD	Watertown, SD	February 25, 2016	Digity, LLC	
KIXX	96.1 MHz	Watertown, SD	Watertown, SD	February 25, 2016	Digity, LLC	
KKSD	104.3 MHz	Milbank, SD	Watertown, SD	February 25, 2016	Digity, LLC	
KSDR	1480 kHz	Watertown, SD	Watertown, SD	February 25, 2016	Digity, LLC	
KSDR-FM	92.9 MHz	Watertown, SD	Watertown, SD	February 25, 2016	Digity, LLC	
KWAT	950 kHz	Watertown, SD	Watertown, SD	February 25, 2016	Digity, LLC	
KLAK	97.5 MHz	Tom Bean, TX	Texoma	February 25, 2016	Digity, LLC	
KMKT	93.1 MHz	Bells, TX	Sherman, TX	February 25, 2016	Digity, LLC	
KMAD-FM	102.5 MHz	Whitesboro, TX	Whitesboro, TX	February 25, 2016	Digity, LLC	
WIIL	95.1 MHz	Union Grove, WI	Milwaukee, WI	February 25, 2016	Digity, LLC	Station de facto also serves the North Shore suburbs of Chicago and studios are at Gurnee Mills in Gurnee, Illinois
WLIP	1050 kHz	Kenosha, WI	Milwaukee, WI	February 25, 2016	Digity, LLC	Station de facto also serves the North Shore suburbs of Chicago and studios are at Gurnee Mills in Gurnee, Illinois
WZSR	105.5 MHz	Woodstock, IL	Chicago, IL	April 8, 2019	Matrix Broadcasting LLC	
KVWE	102.9 MHz	Amarillo, TX	Amarillo, TX	July 11, 2019	Gray Television	

=== Divestments before the sale ===
Callsign	Freq.	City	Market	Transferred	From	Divested	To	Notes
KLTA	98.7 MHz	Moorhead, MN	Fargo, ND	June 26, 2013	Triad		Ingstad	
KPFX	107.9 MHz	Fargo, ND	Fargo, ND	June 26, 2013	Triad		Ingstad	
KQWB	1660 kHz	West Fargo, ND	Fargo, ND	June 26, 2013	Triad		Ingstad	
KQWB-FM	105.1 MHz	Breckenridge, MN	Fargo, ND	June 26, 2013	Triad		Ingstad	
KVOX-FM	99.9 MHz	Moorhead, MN	Fargo, ND	June 26, 2013	Triad		Ingstad	
KBMW	1450 kHz	Breckenridge, MN	Fargo, ND	June 26, 2013	Triad		Ingstad	
WGZO	103.1 MHz	Parris I., SC	Savannah, GA	November 11, 2013	Triad		Apex	
KABI	1560 kHz	Abilene, KS	Salina, KS	September 1, 2015	Morris Communications	January 31, 2017	Rocking M Media, LLC	
KSAL	1150 kHz	Abilene, KS	Salina, KS	September 1, 2015	Morris Communications	January 31, 2017	Rocking M Media, LLC	
KSAL-FM	104.9 MHz	Salina, KS	Salina, KS	September 1, 2015	Morris Communications	January 31, 2017	Rocking M Media, LLC	
KYEZ	93.7 MHz	Salina, KS	Salina, KS	September 1, 2015	Morris Communications	January 31, 2017	Rocking M Media, LLC	
KBLS	102.5 MHz	Abilene, KS	Salina, KS	September 1, 2015	Morris Communications	January 31, 2017	Manhattan Broadcasting Co., Inc.	
WANG	1330 kHz	Havelock, NC	Havelock, NC	February 25, 2016	Digity, LLC	December 20, 2017	Dick Broadcasting	
WERO	93.3 MHz	Washington, NC	Greenville, NC	February 25, 2016	Digity, LLC	December 20, 2017	Dick Broadcasting	
WKZQ-FM	96.1 MHz	Forestbrook, SC	Myrtle Beach, SC	February 25, 2016	Digity, LLC	December 20, 2017	Dick Broadcasting	
WMYB	92.1 MHz	Myrtle Beach, SC	Myrtle Beach, SC	February 25, 2016	Digity, LLC	December 20, 2017	Dick Broadcasting	
WQSL	92.3 MHz	Jacksonville, NC	Wilmington, NC	February 25, 2016	Digity, LLC	December 20, 2017	Dick Broadcasting	
WQZL	101.1 MHz	Belhaven, NC	Greenville, NC	February 25, 2016	Digity, LLC	December 20, 2017	Dick Broadcasting	
WRNS	960 kHz	Kinston, NC	Kinston, NC	February 25, 2016	Digity, LLC	December 20, 2017	Dick Broadcasting	
WRNS-FM	95.1 MHz	Kinston, NC	Kinston, NC	February 25, 2016	Digity, LLC	December 20, 2017	Dick Broadcasting	
WRNN	1450 kHz	Myrtle Beach, SC	Myrtle Beach, SC	February 25, 2016	Digity, LLC	December 20, 2017	Dick Broadcasting	
WRNN-FM	99.5 MHz	Socastee, SC	Myrtle Beach, SC	February 25, 2016	Digity, LLC	December 20, 2017	Dick Broadcasting	
WXQR-FM	105.5 MHz	Jacksonville, NC	Jacksonville, NC	February 25, 2016	Digity, LLC	December 20, 2017	Dick Broadcasting	
WYAV	104.1 MHz	Myrtle Beach, SC	Grand Strand, SC	February 25, 2016	Digity, LLC	December 20, 2017	Dick Broadcasting	
KDKD-FM	95.3 MHz	Clinton, MO	Clinton, MO	February 25, 2016	Digity, LLC	October 11, 2018	Radford Media Group	
KDKD	1280 MHz	Clinton, MO	Clinton, MO	February 25, 2016	Digity, LLC	October 11, 2018	Radford Media Group	
KXEA	104.9 MHz	Lowry City, MO	Lowry City, MO	February 25, 2016	Digity, LLC	October 11, 2018	Radford Media Group	
WRMF	97.9 MHz	Palm Beach, FL	Palm Beach County, FL	February 25, 2016	Digity, LLC	November 14, 2018	Hubbard Radio	
WEAT	107.9 MHz	West Palm Beach, FL	West Palm Beach, FL	February 25, 2016	Digity, LLC	November 14, 2018	Hubbard Radio	
WIRK	103.1 MHz	Indiantown, FL	West Palm Beach, FL	February 25, 2016	Digity, LLC	November 14, 2018	Hubbard Radio	
WMBX	102.3 MHz	Jensen Beach, FL	West Palm Beach, FL	February 25, 2016	Digity, LLC	November 14, 2018	Hubbard Radio	
WFTL	850 kHz	West Palm Beach, FL	South Florida	April 27, 2017	ACM JCE IV B LLC	November 14, 2018	Hubbard Radio	
WMEN	640 kHz	Royal Palm Beach, FL	South Florida	April 27, 2017	ACM JCE IV B LLC	November 14, 2018	Hubbard Radio	
WKOY-FM	100.9 MHz	Princeton, WV	Bluefield, WV	June 26, 2013	Triad	December 17, 2018	First Media Services, LLC	
WKEZ	1240 kHz	Bluefield, WV	Bluefield, WV	June 26, 2013	Triad	December 17, 2018	First Media Services, LLC	
WHAJ	104.5 MHz	Bluefield, WV	Bluefield, WV	June 26, 2013	Triad	December 17, 2018	First Media Services, LLC	
WHIS	1440 kHz	Bluefield, WV	Bluefield, WV	June 26, 2013	Triad	December 17, 2018	First Media Services, LLC	
WHKX	106.3 MHz	Bluefield, VA	Bluefield, WV	June 26, 2013	Triad	December 17, 2018	First Media Services, LLC	
WHQX	107.7 MHz	Gary, WV	Bluefield, WV	June 26, 2013	Triad	December 17, 2018	First Media Services, LLC	
WCPR-FM	97.9 MHz	Wiggins, MS	Biloxi, MS	June 26, 2013	Triad	February 28, 2019	Telesouth Communications	
WGBL	96.7 MHz	Gulfport, MS	Biloxi, MS	June 26, 2013	Triad	February 28, 2019	Telesouth Communications	
WANG	1490 kHz	Biloxi, MS	Biloxi, MS	June 26, 2013	Triad	February 28, 2019	Telesouth Communications	
WTNI	1640 kHz	Biloxi, MS	Biloxi, MS	June 26, 2013	Triad	February 28, 2019	Telesouth Communications	
WXYK	105.9 MHz	Pascagoula, MS	Biloxi, MS	June 26, 2013	Triad	March 1, 2019	Teleouth Communications	
WLGF	107.1 MHz	Gulfport, MS	Biloxi, MS	June 26, 2013	Triad	February 28, 2019	Port Broadcasting	
WRXQ	100.7 MHz	Coal City, IL	Chicago, IL	February 25, 2016	Digity, LLC	April 14, 2019	Walnut Radio Illinois	
WIRL	1290 kHz	Peoria, IL	Peoria, IL	June 26, 2013	Triad	April 30, 2019	Midwest Communications	
WMBD	1470 kHz	Peoria, IL	Peoria, IL	June 26, 2013	Triad	April 30, 2019	Midwest Communications	
WPBG	93.3 MHz	Peoria, IL	Peoria, IL	June 26, 2013	Triad	April 30, 2019	Midwest Communications	
WSWT	106.9 MHz	Peoria, IL	Peoria, IL	June 26, 2013	Triad	April 30, 2019	Midwest Communications	
WNGY	102.3 MHz	Morton, IL	Peoria, IL	June 26, 2013	Triad	April 30, 2019	Midwest Communications	
WXCL	104.9 MHz	Pekin, IL	Peoria, IL	June 26, 2013	Triad	April 30, 2019	Midwest Communications	
KZKV	103.1 MHz	Karnes City, TX	San Antonio, TX	January 2014	BMP Radio	May 10, 2022	Educational Media Foundation	
WRWN	107.9 MHz	Port Royal, SC	Savannah, GA	June 26, 2013	Triad	December 1, 2022	Dick Broadcasting	
WGCO	98.3 MHz	Midway, GA	Savannah, GA	June 26, 2013	Triad	December 1, 2022	Dick Broadcasting	
WFXH-FM	106.1 MHz	Hilton Head Island, SC	Savannah, GA	June 26, 2013	Triad	December 1, 2022	Dick Broadcasting	
WUBB	106.9 MHz	Bluffton, SC	Savannah, GA	June 26, 2013	Triad	December 1, 2022	Dick Broadcasting	
WHHW	1130 kHz	Hilton Head Island, SC	Savannah, GA	June 26, 2013	Triad	December 1, 2022	Dick Broadcasting	
WXYY	100.1 MHz	Rincon, GA	Savannah, GA	March 3, 2014	Tama Broadcasting	December 1, 2022	Dick Broadcasting	
