= KNWH =

Radio station in Yucca Valley, California

Simulcasts KNWZ Coachella
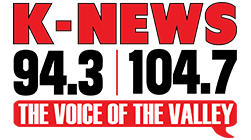
- Yucca Valley, California; United States
- Broadcast area: Coachella Valley
- Frequency: 1250 kHz
- Branding: K-News 94.3 104.7

Programming
- Format: Talk
- Network: ABC News Radio
- Affiliations: CBS News Radio; Compass Media Networks; Premiere Networks; Westwood One

Ownership
- Owner: Connoisseur Media; (Alpha Media Licensee LLC)
- Sister stations: KCLB-FM; KCLZ; KDES-FM; KDGL; KKUU; KNWQ; KNWZ; KPSI-FM; K297BO

History
- First air date: April 3, 1961; 65 years ago
- Former call signs: KDHI (1961–1994); KQYN (1994–2005); KNWH (2005–2007); KDGR (2007)
- Call sign meaning: "K-News"

Technical information
- Licensing authority: FCC
- Facility ID: 67028
- Class: D
- Power: 800 watts day; 77 watts night
- Transmitter coordinates: 34°7′51″N 116°22′15″W
- Translator: 103.7 K279CO (Yucca Valley)

Links
- Public license information: Public file; LMS
- Webcast: Listen live
- Website: www.knewsradio.com

KNWH (1250 AM) is a commercial radio station licensed to Yucca Valley, California. It simulcasts a talk radio format with sister stations 970 KNWZ and 1160 KNWQ. It is owned by Connoisseur Media. The studios are on North Gene Autry Trail (California State Route 111) in Palm Springs.

By day, KNWH is powered at 800 watts non-directional. To avoid interference to other stations on 1250 AM, KNWH must reduce power at night to 77 watts. Programming is also heard on several FM translators in the Coachella Valley.

== Programming ==
Weekdays begin with the K-News Morning Show, a local wake-up program with Mike Mozingo and Kris Long. The rest of the weekday schedule is nationally syndicated talk programs: The Dan Bongino Show, The Sean Hannity Show, The Mark Levin Show, The Ben Shapiro Show, The Matt Walsh Show, Coast to Coast AM with George Noory, This Morning, America's First News with Gordon Deal and Markley, Van Camp & Robbins.

Syndicated weekend shows include the CBS News Weekend Roundup, The Ramsey Show with Dave Ramsey, Rich DiMuro on Tech, Bill Handel on the Law, The Takeout with Major Garrett and Somewhere in Time with Art Bell. Most hours begin with an update from CBS News Radio.

== History ==
The station signed on the air on April 3, 1961, under the call sign KDHI. It was originally a daytimer, licensed to Twenty-Nine Palms, California. It ran 1,000 watts but had to go off the air by sunset. KDHI was owned by Hi-Desert Broadcasting Company.

In 1993, the station adopted an oldies format. In December 1994, its call sign was changed to KQYN and it adopted a classic rock format. In October 1995, the station adopted an adult standards format. KQYN later aired an all-news format, with programming from CNN.

In 2005, the station was sold to Morris Communications for $100,000. Its call sign was changed to KNWH, and it adopted a news-talk format, simulcasting KNWQ and KNWZ. On January 15, 2007, its call sign was briefly changed to KDGR; on February 1, 2007, it was changed back to KNWH.

Morris Communications sold its radio stations to Alpha Media in 2015 for over $38 million. Alpha Media merged with Connoisseur Media on September 4, 2025.
