= KNWQ =

Radio station in Palm Springs, California

Simulcasts KNWZ Coachella
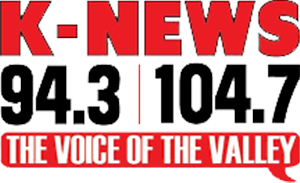
- Palm Springs, California; United States
- Broadcast area: Coachella Valley
- Frequency: 1140 kHz
- Branding: K-News 94.3 - 104.7

Programming
- Format: News/talk
- Network: ABC News Radio
- Affiliations: CBS News Radio; Compass Media Networks; Premiere Networks; Westwood One

Ownership
- Owner: Connoisseur Media; (Alpha Media Licensee LLC)
- Sister stations: KCLB-FM; KCLZ; KDES-FM; KDGL; KKUU; KNWH; KNWZ; KPSI-FM

History
- First air date: February 12, 1946; 80 years ago
- Former call signs: KCMJ (1946–2001); KNWZ (2001)
- Former frequencies: 1340 kHz (1946–1958); 1010 kHz (1958–1985)
- Call sign meaning: "K-News"

Technical information
- Licensing authority: FCC
- Facility ID: 72030
- Class: B
- Power: 10,000 watts day; 2,500 watts night
- Transmitter coordinates: 33°51′39.1″N 116°28′23″W
- Translator: 94.3 K232CX (Desert Hot Springs)

Links
- Public license information: Public file; LMS
- Webcast: Listen live
- Website: www.knewsradio.com

KNWQ (1140 AM) is a commercial radio station licensed to Palm Springs, California. It simulcasts a news/talk format with sister stations 970 KNWZ and 1250 KNWH. It is owned by Alpha Media. The studios are on North Gene Autry Trail (California State Route 111) in Palm Springs.

By day, KNWQ is powered at 10,000 watts. As 1140 AM is a clear-channel frequency, on which XEMR-AM in Monterrey and WRVA in Richmond share Class A status, KNWQ must reduce power at night to 2,500 watts to avoid interference. Programming is also heard on several FM translators in the Coachella Valley.

== Programming ==
Weekdays begin with the K-News Morning Show, a local wake-up program with Mike Mozingo and Kris Long. The rest of the weekday schedule is nationally syndicated talk programs: The Dan Bongino Show, The Sean Hannity Show, The Mark Levin Show, The Ben Shapiro Show, The Matt Walsh Show, Coast to Coast AM with George Noory, This Morning, America's First News with Gordon Deal and Markley, Van Camp & Robbins.

Syndicated weekend shows include the CBS News Weekend Roundup, The Ramsey Show with Dave Ramsey, Rich DiMuro on Tech, Bill Handel on the Law, The Takeout with Major Garrett and Somewhere in Time with Art Bell. Most hours begin with an update from CBS News Radio.

== History ==
The station signed on on February 12, 1946, as KCMJ. It was owned by Palm Springs Broadcasting Company and originally broadcast at 1340 kHz, running 250 watts.

In 1958, the station's frequency was changed to 1010 kHz, running 1,000 watts during the day and 500 watts at night. In 1985, its frequency was changed to 1140 kHz, running 10,000 watts during the day and 2,500 watts at night.

KCMJ aired a country music format in the 1980s and early 1990s. In 1994, the station adopted a sports talk format.

In 1995, it adopted an adult standards format. In 2001, the station adopted a news-talk format, and the adult standards format moved to AM 1010, along with the KCMJ call sign. In connection with the format change, 1140's call sign was changed to KNWZ on January 18, 2001, and to KNWQ on January 25, 2001. The radio station is currently off air.
