= KCOB =

KCOB may refer to:

- KCOB (AM), a radio station (1280 AM) licensed to Newton, Iowa, United States
- KCOB-FM, a radio station (95.9 FM) licensed to Newton, Iowa, United States
