= KLGR =

KLGR may refer to:

- KLGR (AM), a radio station (1490 AM) licensed to Redwood Falls, Minnesota, United States
- KLGR-FM, a radio station (97.7 FM) licensed to Redwood Falls, Minnesota, United States
