= KCMJ =

KCMJ may refer to:

- KCMJ-LP, a defunct low-power radio station (93.9 FM) that was licensed to serve Colorado Springs, Colorado, United States
- KNWQ, a radio station (1140 AM) licensed to serve Palm Springs, California, United States, which held the call sign KCMJ from 1946 to 2001
- KXPS, a radio station (1010 AM) licensed to serve Thousand Palms, California, United States, which held the call sign KCMJ from January 2001 to October 2001
- KGAY (AM), a radio station (1270 AM) licensed to serve Thousand Palms, California, United States, which held the call sign KCMJ from October 2001 to 2004
- KKUU, a radio station (92.7 FM) licensed to serve Indio, California, United States, which held the call sign KCMJ-FM from 1984 to 1998
