= KWIQ =

KWIQ may refer to:

- KWIQ-FM, a radio station (100.5 FM) licensed to Moses Lake, Washington, United States
- KWIQ (AM), a radio station (1020 AM) licensed to Moses Lake North, Washington, United States
