= Kotb =

Kotb may refer to:

- Qutb, or Kotb, an astronomical term or a spiritual symbol, or Sufi spiritual leader
- Ahmed Kotb (born 1991), Egyptian volleyball player
- Heba Kotb (born 1967), Egyptian sex therapist and TV presenter
- Hoda Kotb (born 1964), American-Egyptian journalist, TV personality and author
- Madiha Kotb (born 1953), Egyptian-born Canadian engineer
- KOTB-FM, original call sign of KBMG, an American radio station
