= KNWZ =

Radio station in Coachella, California

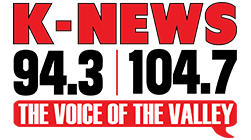
- Coachella, California; United States
- Broadcast area: Coachella Valley
- Frequency: 970 kHz
- Branding: K-News 94.3 104.7

Programming
- Format: News/talk
- Network: ABC News Radio
- Affiliations: CBS News Radio; Compass Media Networks; Premiere Networks; Westwood One

Ownership
- Owner: Connoisseur Media; (Alpha Media Licensee LLC)
- Sister stations: KCLB-FM; KCLZ; KDES-FM; KDGL; KKUU; KNWH; KNWQ; KPSI-FM

History
- First air date: 1954
- Former call signs: KCHV (1954–1983); KVIM (1983–1989); KCLB (1989–2001)
- Call sign meaning: "K-News"

Technical information
- Licensing authority: FCC
- Facility ID: 12130
- Class: B
- Power: 5,000 watts day; 360 watts night
- Transmitter coordinates: 33°41′12.1″N 116°9′31″W
- Translator: 104.7 K284CR (Palm Springs)
- Repeaters: 1140 KNWQ (Palm Springs); 1250 KNWH (Yucca Valley); 92.7 KKUU-HD2 (Indio)

Links
- Public license information: Public file; LMS
- Webcast: Listen live
- Website: www.knewsradio.com

KNWZ (970 AM) is a commercial radio station licensed to Coachella, California. It simulcasts a news/talk format with sister stations 1140 KNWQ and 1250 KNWH. It is owned by Connoisseur Media. The studios are on North Gene Autry Trail (California State Route 111) in Palm Springs.

By day, KNWZ is powered at 5,000 watts. To avoid interference to other stations on 970 AM, KNWZ must reduce power at night to 360 watts. It uses a directional antenna with a three-tower array. Programming is also heard on several FM translators in the Coachella Valley.

== Programming ==
Weekdays begin with the K-News Morning Show, a local wake-up program with Mike Mozingo and Kris Long. The rest of the weekday schedule is nationally syndicated talk programs: The Dan Bongino Show, The Sean Hannity Show, The Mark Levin Show, The Ben Shapiro Show, The Matt Walsh Show, Coast to Coast AM with George Noory, This Morning, America's First News with Gordon Deal and Markley, Van Camp & Robbins.

Syndicated weekend shows include the CBS News Weekend Roundup, The Ramsey Show with Dave Ramsey, Rich DiMuro on Tech, Bill Handel on the Law, The Takeout with Major Garrett and Somewhere in Time with Art Bell. Most hours begin with an update from CBS News Radio.

== History ==
=== KCHV, KVIM ===
The station began broadcasting in 1954 as KCHV. It was a daytimer, powered at 1,000 watts, and required to go off the air at sunset. KCHV was owned by the Coachella Valley Broadcasting Company. In 1963, its daytime power was increased to 5,000 watts and it began nighttime operations, running 1,000 watts.

On August 26, 1983, the station's call sign was changed to KVIM. On September 1, 1989, its call sign was changed to KCLB. Spanish language formats were aired as KVIM and KCLB.

=== KNWZ ===
KNWZ debuted at 1270 AM in 1988 under the ownership of William Hart. It was the area's second attempt at an all-news format in the style of KNX, the all-news station in Los Angeles. But soon it was converted to a talk radio format. Jerry Jolstead had sold the station and Hart purchased it from Mary and Kate Neiswender. The morning drive slot was occupied from 1994 to 2000 by Luigi Rossetti under the air name of "Lou Penrose". Rossetti left the station at the height of his popularity to accept a position as District Director for Congresswoman Mary Bono. The Lou Penrose Morning Talk Show was followed in late mornings by former television newsman Ron Fortner. Fortner was let go in 1998, immediately after the purchase of the station by Morris Communications as part of the new Desert Radio Group.

The station had been simulcast on two FM repeaters and one other station (94.3, 103.9 and 106.9) from April 1995 to October 1998, when Morris purchased the stations; it then converted all three of the FM stations to music formats. Morris then moved KNWZ to 970 and 1140 AM on January 1, 2001.

In October 2009, K-News began to operate an FM radio translator on 94.3 MHz from Desert Hot Springs covering the Coachella Valley. In 2016, KNWZ began to be heard on 103.7 in the Twentynine Palms area. In 2018, it added a translator on 104.7 FM for the Palm Springs area, in addition to 94.3 FM from Coachella.

Morris sold its radio stations to Alpha Media LLC for $38.25 million, effective September 1, 2015. Alpha Media merged with Connoisseur Media on September 4, 2025.
