= Twentynine Palms, California =

City in California, United States

- City
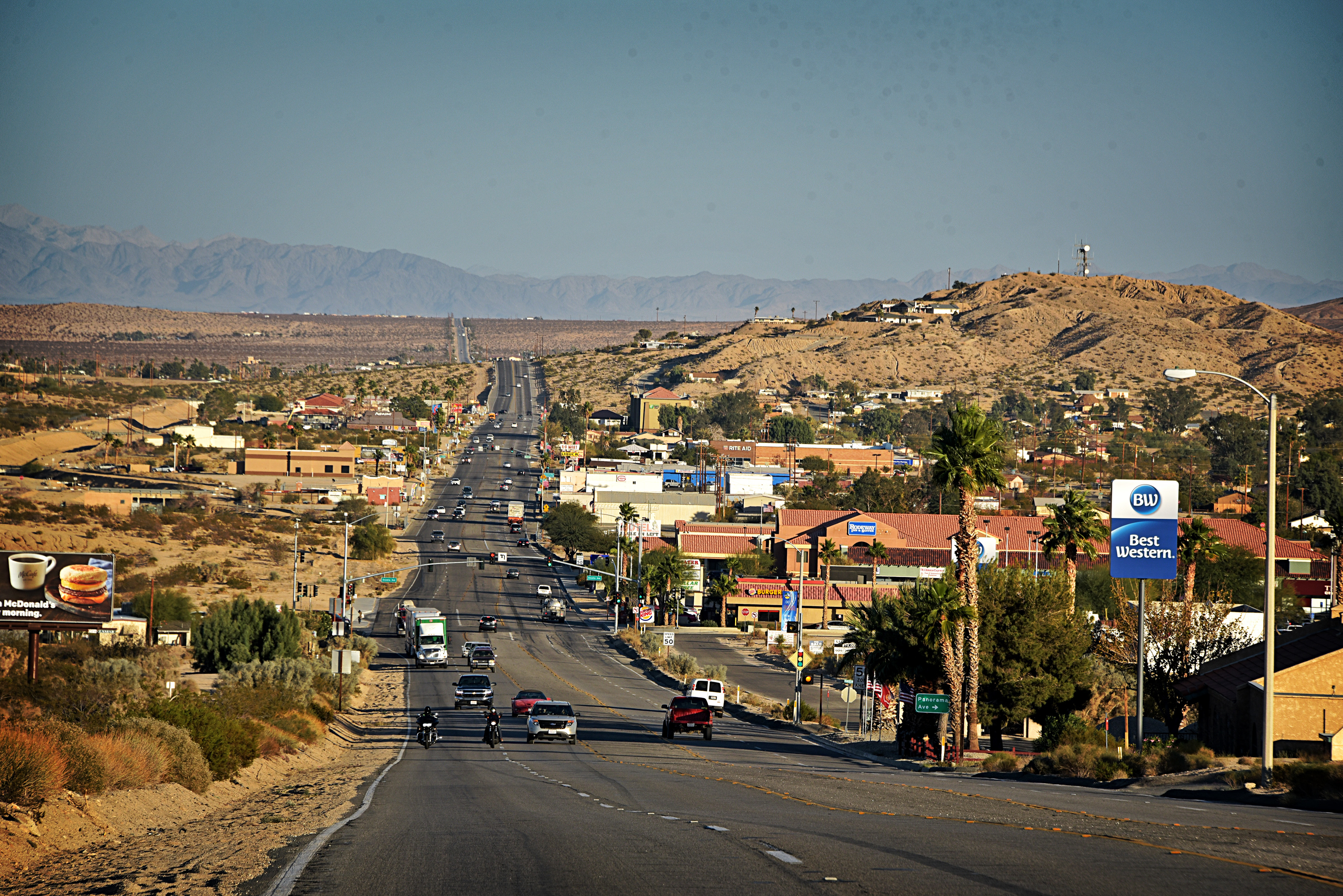
- Twentynine Palms, looking east on CA-62

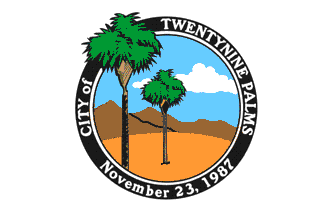
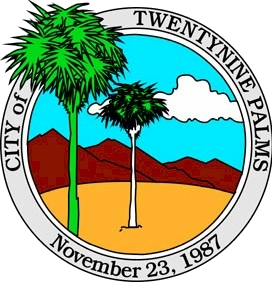
- Flag Seal
- Motto: "A Beautiful Desert Oasis"
- Interactive map of Twentynine Palms, California
- Location in the United States
- Coordinates: 34°08′08″N 116°03′15″W
- Country: United States
- State: California
- County: San Bernardino
- Incorporated: November 23, 1987

Government
  - Type: Council–manager

Area
  - Total: 58.75 sq mi (152.16 km^{2})
  - Land: 58.75 sq mi (152.16 km^{2})
  - Water: 0 sq mi (0 km^{2}) 0%
- Elevation: 1,988 ft (606 m)

Population (2020)
  - Total: 28,065
  - Density: 477.71/sq mi (184.44/km^{2})
- Time zone: UTC−8 (Pacific)
  - Summer (DST): UTC−7 (PDT)
- ZIP codes: 92277-92278
- Area codes: 442/760
- FIPS code: 06-80994
- GNIS feature IDs: 1652804, 2412119
- Website: ci.twentynine-palms.ca.us

Twentynine Palms (also known as 29 Palms) is a city in San Bernardino County, California, United States. As of the 2020 census, Twentynine Palms had a population of 28,065. It serves as one of the entry points to Joshua Tree National Park and the Mojave Desert region.

== History ==
Colonel Henry Washington made the first recorded exploration of Twentynine Palms, where he found people of the Chemehuevi tribe who lived in the surrounding hills and near the spring that they called "Mar-rah" or "Oasis of Mara". The community was named for the 29 palms (Washingtonia filifera) that the Serrano had planted surrounding the Oasis of Mara. Nearby is also a small Indian reservation belonging to the Twenty-Nine Palms Band of Mission Indians.

A post office was established in 1927. A road named Utah Trail honors the late-19th century wagon trains and pioneers, originating in St. George, Utah and stretching all the way to Twentynine Palms.

Joshua Tree National Park lies just to the south of Twentynine Palms. It was designated a US national monument in 1936 and became a national park in 1994. The nearby Marine Corps Air Ground Combat Center Twentynine Palms was founded in 1952.

== Demographics ==
Historical population
Census	Pop.	Note	%±
1970	5,667		—
1980	7,465		31.7%
1990	11,821		58.4%
2000	14,764		24.9%
2010	25,048		69.7%
2020	28,065		12.0%
U.S. Decennial Census; 1850–1870 1880–1890; 1900 1910 1920; 1930 1940 1950; 1960 1970 1980; 1990 2000 2010

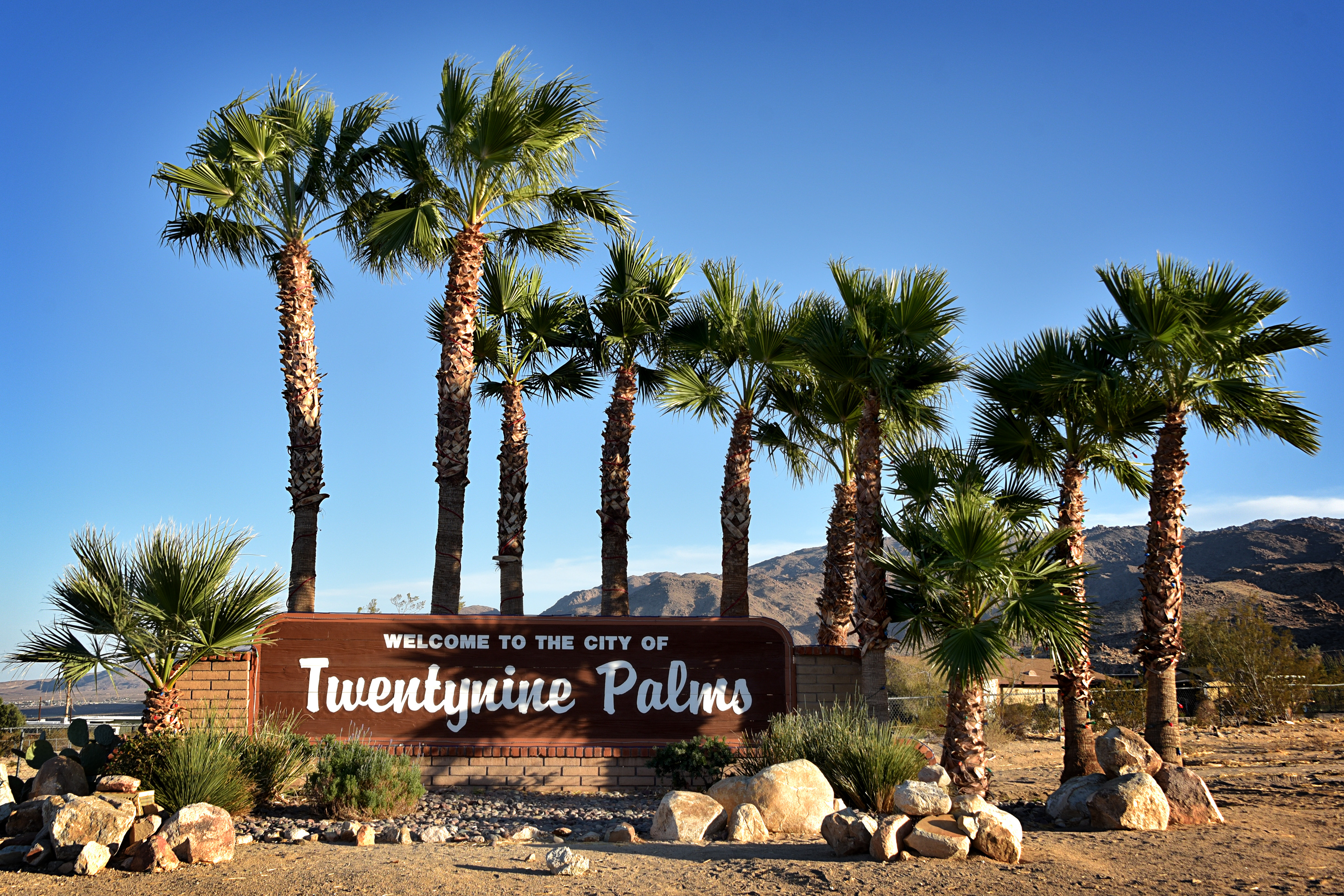
Twentynine Palms sign

Twentynine Palms first appeared as a census designated place in the 1970 U.S. census; and then as a city in the 1990 U.S. census.

=== Racial and ethnic composition ===
Twentynine Palms city, California – Racial and ethnic composition Note: the US Census treats Hispanic/Latino as an ethnic category. This table excludes Latinos from the racial categories and assigns them to a separate category. Hispanics/Latinos may be of any race.
Race / Ethnicity (NH = Non-Hispanic)	Pop 2000	Pop 2010	Pop 2020	% 2000	% 2010	% 2020
White alone (NH)	9,548	15,229	14,045	64.67%	60.80%	50.04%
Black or African American alone (NH)	1,313	1,921	2,956	8.89%	7.67%	10.53%
Native American or Alaska Native alone (NH)	161	240	281	1.09%	0.96%	1.00%
Asian alone (NH)	553	938	1,599	3.75%	3.74%	5.70%
Native Hawaiian or Pacific Islander alone (NH)	249	322	336	1.69%	1.29%	1.20%
Other race alone (NH)	44	37	214	0.30%	0.15%	0.76%
Mixed race or Multiracial (NH)	694	1,149	1,783	4.70%	4.59%	6.35%
Hispanic or Latino (any race)	2,202	5,212	6,851	14.91%	20.81%	24.41%
Total	14,764	25,048	28,065	100.00%	100.00%	100.00%

=== 2020 census ===
As of the 2020 census, Twentynine Palms had a population of 28,065. The population density was 477.7 inhabitants per square mile (184.4/km^{2}). The median age was 25.7 years. The age distribution was 20.9% under the age of 18, 26.0% aged 18 to 24, 32.6% aged 25 to 44, 13.1% aged 45 to 64, and 7.4% aged 65 or older. For every 100 females, there were 150.2 males, and for every 100 females age 18 and over, there were 167.4 males age 18 and over.

The census reported that 77.2% of the population lived in households, 22.8% lived in non-institutionalized group quarters, and no one was institutionalized. 87.5% of residents lived in urban areas, while 12.5% lived in rural areas.

There were 8,353 households, of which 36.5% had children under the age of 18. Of all households, 50.1% were married-couple households, 6.7% were cohabiting couple households, 22.2% had a female householder with no spouse or partner present, and 21.0% had a male householder with no spouse or partner present. About 24.1% of all households were made up of individuals, and 7.8% had someone living alone who was 65 years of age or older. The average household size was 2.6. There were 5,767 families (69.0% of all households).

There were 9,541 housing units at an average density of 162.4 units per square mile (62.7 units/km^{2}), of which 8,353 (87.5%) were occupied. Of occupied units, 36.4% were owner-occupied, and 63.6% were occupied by renters. The homeowner vacancy rate was 4.7% and the rental vacancy rate was 9.1%.

Racial composition as of the 2020 census
Race	Number	Percent
White	16,582	59.1%
Black or African American	3,323	11.8%
American Indian and Alaska Native	391	1.4%
Asian	1,641	5.8%
Native Hawaiian and Other Pacific Islander	365	1.3%
Some other race	2,281	8.1%
Two or more races	3,482	12.4%

=== 2023 ACS estimates ===
In 2023, the US Census Bureau estimated that the median household income was $56,000, and the per capita income was $29,241. About 11.7% of families and 15.4% of the population were below the poverty line.

=== 2010 census ===
At the 2010 census, there were 25,048 people in 8,095 households, including 5,847 families, in the city. The population density was 423.5 inhabitants per square mile (163.5/km^{2}). There were 9,431 housing units at an average density of 159.5 per square mile, of the occupied units 2,742 (33.9%) were owner-occupied and 5,353 (66.1%) were rented. The homeowner vacancy rate was 3.6%; the rental vacancy rate was 9.2%. 6,876 people (27.5% of the population) lived in owner-occupied housing units and 14,825 people (59.2%) lived in rental housing units. The racial makeup of the city was 71.6% White (60.8% non-Hispanic), 8.2% African American, 1.3% Native American, 3.9% Asian, 1.4% Pacific Islander, 6.7% from other races, and 6.9% mixed with two or more races. Hispanic or Latino people of any race were 20.8% of the population.

The census reported that 21,701 people (86.6% of the population) lived in households, and 3,347 (13.4%) lived in non-institutionalized group quarters.

Of the 8,095 households, 43.3% had children under the age of 18 living in them, 54.5% were opposite-sex married couples living together and 12.9% had a female householder with no husband present, while 4.9% had a male householder with no wife present. There were 5% of residents living as unmarried opposite-sex partnerships, and 1.6% as same-sex married couples or partnerships. Some 21.1% of households were one person, and 5.6% were one person aged 65 or older. The average household size was 2.68, and the average family size was 3.1.

The age distribution was 25.6% under the age of 18, 30% aged 18 to 24, 25.5% aged 25 to 44, 13.1% aged 45 to 64, and 5.8% who were over 65. The median age was 23.5 years. For every 100 females, there were 129 males. For every 100 females aged 18 and older, there were 139.9 males.

The median household income was $42,572; about 14.4% of the population were living below the poverty line.

== Geography ==
The city is located in the Mojave Desert, in inland Southern California. It lies on the northern side of Joshua Tree National Park and contains one of the entrances to Joshua Tree, the Oasis of Mara.

According to the United States Census Bureau, the city has a total area of 58.7 square miles (152 km^{2}), all land. The city is at an elevation of 1,988 feet (606 m) above sea level.

=== Climate ===
Due, in large part, to its elevation of more than 1,900 feet (580 m) above sea level, Twentynine Palms has a slightly cooler climate, especially during winter, than nearby Palm Springs, but with essentially the same subtropical-desert characteristics. On average, temperatures reach 100 °F (37.8 °C) on 89 days of the year and 90 °F (32.2 °C) on 154 days; the freezing mark is reached an average of 17 nights, annually. Extremes range from 9 °F (−12.8 °C) on December 23, 1990, to 119 °F (48.3 °C) on July 11, 1961. Winters are moderately cool, with daytime highs in the 60s °F and lows in the 40s °F. Summers are very hot, with regular daytime high temperatures above 100 °F (37.8 °C). The wettest month is August, with 0.65 inches (16.5 mm) of rain, mostly from monsoon thunderstorms; in some areas of low-lying terrain or canyons, flash flooding is a concern.

Climate data for Twentynine Palms, California, 1991–2020 normals, extremes 1935–present
Month	Jan	Feb	Mar	Apr	May	Jun	Jul	Aug	Sep	Oct	Nov	Dec	Year
Record high °F (°C)	85 (29)	90 (32)	95 (35)	102 (39)	112 (44)	117 (47)	118 (48)	116 (47)	114 (46)	106 (41)	93 (34)	86 (30)	118 (48)
Mean maximum °F (°C)	74.3 (23.5)	78.1 (25.6)	86.9 (30.5)	95.0 (35.0)	101.8 (38.8)	109.6 (43.1)	112.4 (44.7)	110.5 (43.6)	105.4 (40.8)	96.6 (35.9)	83.9 (28.8)	73.9 (23.3)	113.3 (45.2)
Mean daily maximum °F (°C)	63.3 (17.4)	67.2 (19.6)	74.1 (23.4)	81.1 (27.3)	89.9 (32.2)	99.4 (37.4)	104.0 (40.0)	102.7 (39.3)	96.5 (35.8)	84.7 (29.3)	71.6 (22.0)	62.0 (16.7)	83.0 (28.3)
Daily mean °F (°C)	52.6 (11.4)	55.7 (13.2)	61.7 (16.5)	67.8 (19.9)	76.4 (24.7)	85.1 (29.5)	90.7 (32.6)	89.6 (32.0)	82.9 (28.3)	71.2 (21.8)	59.3 (15.2)	50.9 (10.5)	70.3 (21.3)
Mean daily minimum °F (°C)	41.8 (5.4)	44.1 (6.7)	49.3 (9.6)	54.5 (12.5)	62.9 (17.2)	70.7 (21.5)	77.4 (25.2)	76.4 (24.7)	69.3 (20.7)	57.8 (14.3)	47.0 (8.3)	39.9 (4.4)	57.6 (14.2)
Mean minimum °F (°C)	28.6 (−1.9)	30.6 (−0.8)	35.8 (2.1)	41.0 (5.0)	48.8 (9.3)	56.7 (13.7)	66.8 (19.3)	64.4 (18.0)	55.7 (13.2)	42.9 (6.1)	31.8 (−0.1)	27.0 (−2.8)	25.0 (−3.9)
Record low °F (°C)	11 (−12)	18 (−8)	23 (−5)	24 (−4)	33 (1)	43 (6)	53 (12)	52 (11)	38 (3)	24 (−4)	14 (−10)	10 (−12)	10 (−12)
Average precipitation inches (mm)	0.50 (13)	0.56 (14)	0.35 (8.9)	0.12 (3.0)	0.05 (1.3)	0.00 (0.00)	0.40 (10)	0.65 (17)	0.34 (8.6)	0.15 (3.8)	0.19 (4.8)	0.56 (14)	3.87 (98)
Average precipitation days (≥ 0.01 in)	3.9	3.2	2.3	1.0	0.6	0.1	1.7	2.3	1.7	1.1	1.0	2.2	21.1
Source: NOAA

== Attractions ==
The "Oasis of Murals," a series of 26 outdoor murals painted on buildings featuring various aspects of desert life and history.

The 29 Palms Historical Society is housed in the original schoolhouse of the city and maintains a museum devoted to local history. The Historical Society also hosts an annual "Weed Show" each November devoted to art work composed of weeds. The Twentynine Palms Artists' Guild maintains exhibits devoted to local artists.

Luckie Park, a local park with grassy areas and playgrounds available. It is the hosting location of some fairs or carnivals that visit the town.

== Economy ==
The Oasis of Mara is the original source of water and the historic source of all economic activity in the area. A long strip of palm trees to the east terminates at the Joshua Tree National Park Visitor Center, which is visited by approximately 140,000 people every year and is maintained by the United States National Park Service. The remainder of the oasis to the west is owned by the 29 Palms Inn and ends in a large shaded pond.

The current economy depends largely on the local Marine Corps Air Ground Combat Center, as well as tourism associated with Joshua Tree National Park. In February 2015, the city established rules governing vacation rentals and has granted approximately 100 permits, compared to over 1,000 in the nearby community of Joshua Tree.

== Government ==
The city uses a council-manager form of government. An elected city council establishes policy and appoints a city manager who executes these policies.

=== State and federal representation ===
In the California State Legislature, Twentynine Palms is in the 19th senatorial district, represented by Republican Rosilicie Ochoa Bogh, and in the 34th Assembly district, represented by Republican Tom Lackey.

In the United States House of Representatives, Twentynine Palms is in California's 23rd congressional district, represented by Republican Jay Obernolte.

== Education ==
- Copper Mountain College is a community college serving the Morongo Basin.
- The Morongo Unified School District provides an education for public school students.
- Mayfield College offers a training program to prepare active duty service members for careers in the Heating, Ventilation, Air Conditioning, and Refrigeration (HVAC/R) industry.

== Media ==
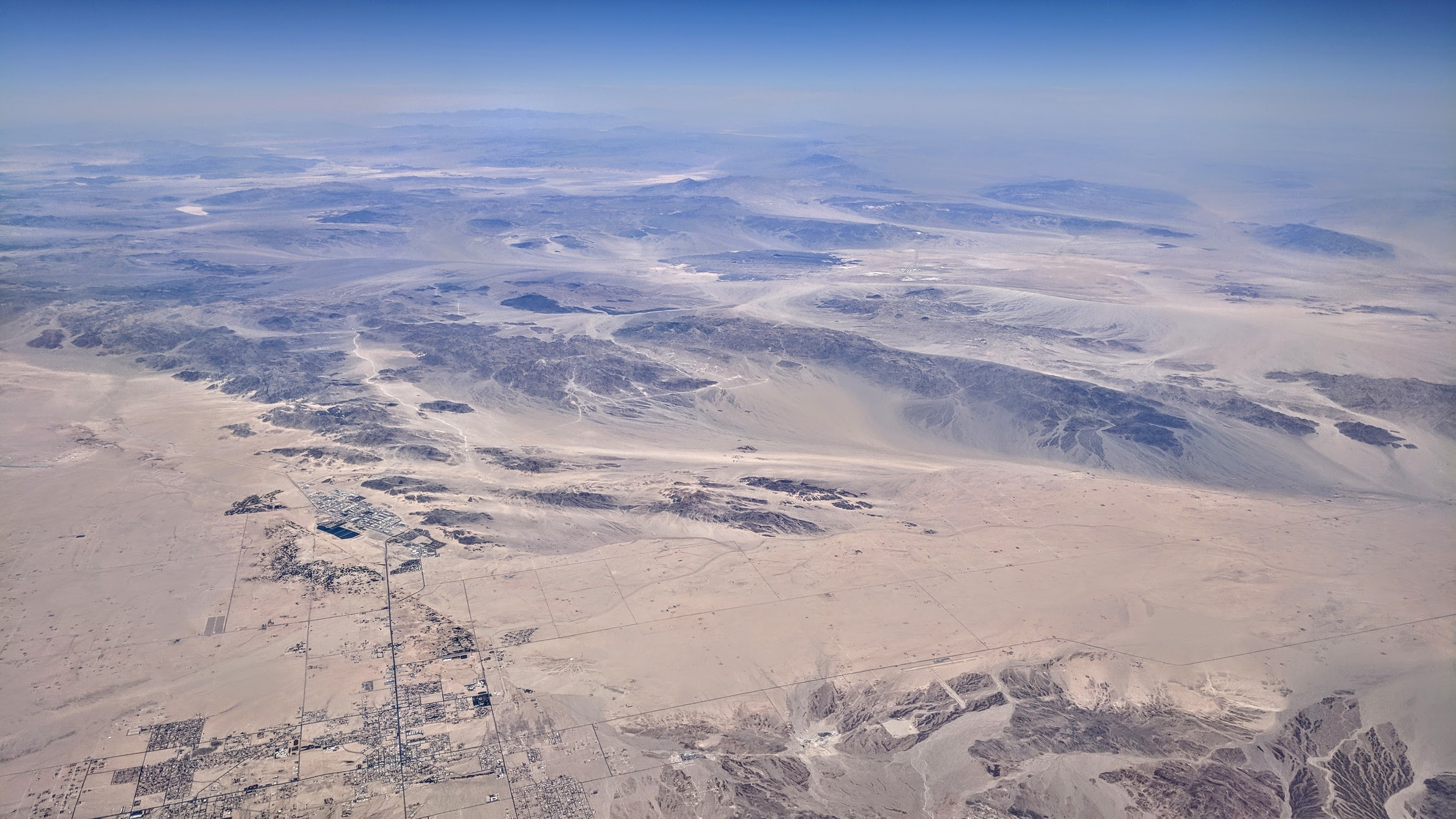
Aerial view of Twentynine Palms from the south, with Mojave Desert behind

The Desert Trail newspaper in Yucca Valley is published weekly. The Sun Runner Magazine of California Desert Life and Culture is published bi-monthly.

There are two TV stations: K15FC-D (KESQ-TV (ABC), KPSP (CBS), KDFX (Fox), KCWQ-LD (CW) and KUNA-LD (Telemundo) subchannels) and KPSE-LD (My Network) 29 (also KMIR-TV (NBC), ION, MeTV and Movies! subchannels) from the Riverside County, California TV market, but the area is actually part of the Palm Springs TV market.

KEXV and KPLM are low power TV stations for the town and Yucca Valley.

KVMD is licensed in Twentynine Palms and serves all of Los Angeles and the Inland Empire.

There is one AM station: KNWH a transmitter of KNWQ-1140 "KNews" Radio – Twentynine Palms (Inland Empire, California and Coachella Valley radio markets) CA US news/talk. There are seven commercial and two public FM stations:

Low power FM translators:

- 89.3 K207FA r.KCRI-89.3 NPR – Twentynine Palms (San Bernardino) CA US Public Radio
- 92.1 KHCS (91.7 Palm Desert) Christian Radio
- 92.7 KKUU (Indio) Urban/Top 40
- 95.5 KCLZ (KCLB Coachella) Rock music and Las Vegas Raiders football
- 96.3 KKCM (KXCM – Palm Springs) Country music
- 103.3 KDHI (KVPW Mecca) Hot AC
- 103.7 (KNWZ-FM 94.3 Desert Hot Springs) News radio
- 106.3 KPLM (Thousand Palms) Country music

Local stations:

- 101.5 KHWY (Amboy) Classic rock (High Desert (California) radio market)
- 102.7 KMRB-FM (Joshua Tree) Variety
- 107.7 KCDZ (Yucca Valley) Local radio

== Transportation ==
- State Route 62 runs east–west through the town.
- Bus service is provided by the Morongo Basin Transit Authority (MBTA).
- The closest passenger airport is Palm Springs Airport (IATA: PSP).

== Notable people ==
- Brant Bjork, musician; owns a house and studio in Twentynine Palms
- Willie Boy, subject of the novel Willie Boy: A Desert Manhunt, and the film Tell Them Willie Boy Is Here; a Piute-Chemehuevi Native American, born in 29 Palms
- Doug Cockle, actor and director
- Conrad Dobler, NFL lineman; attended and played football at Twentynine Palms high school
- Dick Dale, "king of the surf guitar"; lived on a ranch in 29 Palms until he died in 2019
- Mike Evans, actor and writer; longtime resident; died at his mother's house in Twentynine Palms
- Huell Howser, television personality, actor, producer, writer, singer, and voice artist, best known as host of PBS' California's Gold
- Carrie Ann Lucas, lawyer, disability rights advocate, and activist
- Bryan D. O'Connor, retired United States Marine Corps colonel and former NASA astronaut
- Cliff Raven, tattoo pioneer; lived and worked in Twentynine Palms in his later years
- Elizabeth Warder Crozer Campbell, logged thousands of archeological finds in the 1920s in Joshua Tree Park; wrote The Desert Was Home
- Paramahansa Yogananda, Indian yoga master and teacher who lived in America 1920–1952; had a desert retreat in Twentynine Palms

== In popular culture ==
=== Music ===
- The song "The Lady from 29 Palms" was written by Allie Wrubel in 1947 and recorded by such artists as Frank Sinatra, Freddy Martin, Tony Pastor, and The Andrews Sisters.
- The rock group U2 stayed at Harmony Motel in the 1980s when shooting photography for their album The Joshua Tree.
- The album Lily on the Beach by German electronic music ensemble Tangerine Dream contains an instrumental piano ballad called "Twenty-Nine Palms".
- English singer Robert Plant had a hit single called "29 Palms", from his solo album Fate of Nations in 1993.
- The band Sublime mentioned Twentynine Palms in their song "Thanx" on their 40oz. to Freedom album. Twentynine Palms is also a city listed in "April 29, 1992 (Miami)" on their self-titled album Sublime.
- Track two of the album Places by Brad Mehldau, released in 2000, is named after the city.
- Nashville country band Granville Automatic has a song named after the town, inspired by the book by Deanne Stillman.
- Jonathan Richman and the Modern Lovers mention the town in the song "California Desert Party" on the album Modern Lovers '88.

=== Film ===
- Some scenes in the 1963 comedy film It's a Mad, Mad, Mad, Mad World were shot in Twentynine Palms.
- Some scenes in the 1964 comedy film Kiss Me, Stupid were shot in Twentynine Palms.
- Twentynine Palms is a 2003 drama/horror film set in Twentynine Palms.
- Actor Jared Leto launched a skin care line called "Twentynine Palms," inspired by the town.
- Actor/writer/producer, Jason Mamoa filmed "The Last Manhunt" in and around Twentynine Palms.

=== Radio ===
On March 11, 1945, The Chase and Sanborn Hour was broadcast from Twentynine Palms Auxiliary Naval Air Station, featuring the ventriloquist-dummy team Edgar Bergen and Charlie McCarthy, and actress Joan Blondell.

The base hosted The Jack Benny Program on April 22 of the same year. There were jokes about the base's dry, hot weather, along with a comedic sketch of the town's history.
