= KFMT (disambiguation) =

KFMT refers to the following broadcasting stations in the United States:

- KFMT-FM, a radio station (FM 105.5 MHz) licensed to Fremont, Nebraska
- KTLK, a radio station (AM 1260 kHz) licensed to Minneapolis, Minnesota, which held the call sign KFMT from 1923 to 1925
- KWIQ-FM, a radio station (FM 100.5 MHz) licensed to Moses Lake, Washington, which held the call sign KFMT from 1968 to 1980
- KWHT, a radio station (FM 103.5 MHz) licensed to Pendleton, Oregon, which held the call sign KFMT from 1980 to 1985
