= WCPQ =

WCPQ refers to the following broadcasting stations in the United States:

- WWNG, a defunct radio station (1330 AM) licensed to Havelock, North Carolina, which held the call sign WCPQ from 1978 to 1999
- WYHI, a radio station (99.9 FM) licensed to Park Forest, Illinois, which held the call sign WCPQ from 2008 to 2018
