= KXCM =

- Joshua Tree, California; United States
- Broadcast area: Twentynine Palms, California; Yucca Valley, California
- Frequency: 96.3 MHz
- Branding: KX Hot Country

Programming
- Format: Country music

Ownership
- Owner: Copper Mountain Broadcasting Company
- Sister stations: KGAY-FM

Technical information
- Licensing authority: FCC
- Facility ID: 67029
- Class: A
- ERP: 6,000 watts
- HAAT: 74 meters (243 ft)
- Transmitter coordinates: 34°09′15″N 116°11′50″W

Links
- Public license information: Public file; LMS
- Webcast: Listen live
- Website: kxcmradio.com

KXCM (96.3 FM) is a radio station licensed to Joshua Tree, California. The station broadcasts a country music format and is owned by Copper Mountain Broadcasting Company.

Logo while simulcasting with 92.1
