= KMCD =

Radio station in Fairfield, Iowa

Currently silent
- Fairfield, Iowa; United States
- Broadcast area: Eldon, Iowa; Ottumwa, Iowa
- Frequency: 1570 kHz
- Branding: 1570 KMCD

Programming
- Format: Classic country

Ownership
- Owner: Connoisseur Media; (Alpha Media Licensee LLC)
- Sister stations: KKFD-FM

History
- First air date: March 3, 1958
- Last air date: March 31, 2026

Technical information
- Licensing authority: FCC
- Facility ID: 23040
- Class: D
- Power: 250 watts (daytime); 109 watts (nighttime)
- Transmitter coordinates: 41°0′20.1″N 92°1′7.6″W

Links
- Public license information: Public file; LMS
- Website: www.exploreseiowa.com

KMCD (1570 AM) was a commercial radio station serving the Fairfield, Iowa, area. KMCD was owned by Connoisseur Media, through licensee Alpha Media Licensee LLC. The station primarily broadcast a classic country format.

Effective June 1, 2007, the Fairfield Media Group Inc sold the station to GoodRadio.TV LLC. In December 2013, GoodRadio.TV merged into Digity, LLC. Effective February 25, 2016, Digity and its 124 radio stations were acquired by Alpha Media for $264 million.

In May 2025, Connoisseur Media announced its intent to acquire Alpha Media. The FCC approved the sale on August 13, 2025, and the sale was consummated on September 4.

On March 31, 2026, KMCD ceased operations and went silent.
