= KCDZ =

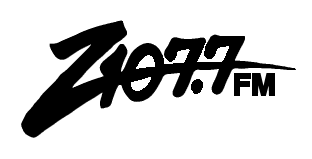
- Twentynine Palms, California; United States
- Frequency: 107.7 MHz
- Branding: Z107.7

Programming
- Format: Hot adult contemporary
- Affiliations: ABC News Radio; Westwood One

Ownership
- Owner: Morongo Basin Broadcasting Corporation

History
- First air date: July 15, 1989; 36 years ago

Technical information
- Licensing authority: FCC
- Facility ID: 43811
- Class: B1
- ERP: 6,700 watts
- HAAT: 93 meters
- Transmitter coordinates: 34°9′15″N 116°11′50″W

Links
- Public license information: Public file; LMS
- Website: z1077fm.com

KCDZ (107.7 FM) is a radio station broadcasting a hot adult contemporary format, licensed to Twentynine Palms, California, United States, the station serves the Twentynine Palms area. The station is currently owned by Morongo Basin Broadcasting Corporation, has been in operation for twenty five years, and features programming from ABC News Radio and Westwood One.
