= Connoisseur Media =

American radio broadcasting company

- Type: Private
- Industry: Mass media
- Genre: Radio broadcasting
- Predecessor: Alpha Media
- Founded: 2004; 22 years ago
- Founder: Jeff Warshaw
- Headquarters: Westport, Connecticut, United States
- Key people: Jeff Warshaw (President/CEO)
- Website: connoisseurmedia.com

Connoisseur Media LLC is an American radio broadcasting company based in Westport, Connecticut and led by Jeff Warshaw. As of May 2026, Connoisseur operates 216 radio stations and digital assets in 47 markets.

== History ==
Founder and CEO, Jeff Warshaw built his first station while still a student at the Wharton School of Business at the University of Pennsylvania. In 1993, Warshaw founded Connoisseur Communications Partners LP, which he later sold to Cumulus Broadcasting in 2000 for $258 million. In 2004, he and CFO Mike Driscoll formed Connoisseur Media which operates 11 radio stations and various digital markets. The first company's acquisition involved several stations in Bloomington, Illinois with capital from hedge fund Farallon Capital, along with its founders. Through a combination of start-ups, move-ins, and acquisitions, Connoisseur Media expanded. It maintains a significant presence in the New York City media market.

It was announced in July 2015 that Petrus Holding Company LP had invested in Connoisseur Media.

On March 27, 2019, Connoisseur Media announced that it would acquire WFRE and sister station WFMD from the Aloha Station Trust in exchange for transferring its Erie, Pennsylvania cluster to iHeartMedia. The sale closed on May 21, 2019.

On August 14, 2019, Connoisseur Media announced the sell of WSBG along with sister station WVPO to Seven Mountains Media for $1.1 million. The sale closed on October 31, 2019.

On April 14, 2022, a group led by Warshaw made an unsolicited offer to acquire Cumulus Media for $1.2 billion including debt, and take the company private; the offer was rejected by Cumulus, who believed that it was undervalued.

On July 26, 2024, Connoisseur Media announced the sale of WFRE and WFMD to Local Daily Media for $4.275 million.

In May 2025, Connoisseur Media announced its intent to acquire Alpha Media for an undisclosed amount, and entered into a transitional local marketing agreement with all of its stations. The merger will expand the company to 218 stations. Warshaw stated that the acquisition would improve the company's scale, and "[give it] all the ingredients to be a highly successful local media company for many years to come." The FCC approved the sale on August 13, 2025, and the sale was consummated on September 4.

In October 2025, Connoisseur announced its intent to acquire Bonneville International's San Francisco cluster, including KUFX, KBLX-FM, KMVQ-FM and KOIT. The sale closed on May 15, 2026 with a price of $10 million.

Connoisseur has subsequently been selling stations in smaller markets. In November 2025, they announced the sale of their Bakersfield stations to Frequency Media and four stations in Minnesota and South Dakota to Christensen Broadcasting; in March 2026 they announced the sale of their stations in Brookings, South Dakota to two employees of the station group, their Topeka cluster to MSC Radio Group, and one of their stations in the Sherman/Denison, Texas market to First Dallas Media.

In March 2026, it was announced that NRG Media would sell its four Lincoln, Nebraska cluster to Connoisseur Media for $5.75 million.

== Radio stations ==
Market	Call Sign	Frequency	Band	Format
Anchorage, Alaska	KHAR	590	AM	Soft oldies/adult standards
Anchorage, Alaska	KFQD	750	AM	News/talk
Anchorage, Alaska	KEAG	97.3	FM	Classic hits
Anchorage, Alaska	KAYO	100.9	FM	Classic country
Anchorage, Alaska	KMXS	103.1	FM	Hot adult contemporary
Anchorage, Alaska	KBRJ	104.1	FM	Country
Anchorage, Alaska	KWHL	106.5	FM	Active rock
Palm Springs, California (Coachella Valley)	KNWZ	970	AM	News/talk
Palm Springs, California (Coachella Valley)	KNWQ	1140	AM	News/talk
Palm Springs, California (Coachella Valley)	KNWH	1250	AM	News/talk
Palm Springs, California (Coachella Valley)	KKUU	92.7	FM	Rhythmic contemporary
Palm Springs, California (Coachella Valley)	KCLB-FM	93.7	FM	Mainstream rock
Palm Springs, California (Coachella Valley)	KCLZ	95.5	FM	Mainstream rock
Palm Springs, California (Coachella Valley)	KDES-FM	98.5	FM	Country
Palm Springs, California (Coachella Valley)	KPSI-FM	100.5	FM	Hot adult contemporary
Palm Springs, California (Coachella Valley)	KDGL	106.9	FM	Classic hits
Palm Springs, California (Coachella Valley)	K297BO	107.3	FM	Adult standards
San Francisco (Bay Area)	KKDV	92.1	FM	Country
San Francisco (Bay Area)	KBAY	94.5	FM	Country
San Francisco (Bay Area)	KUIC	95.3	FM	Adult contemporary
San Francisco (Bay Area)	KOIT	96.5	FM	Adult contemporary
San Francisco (Bay Area)	KUFX	98.5	FM	Country
San Francisco (Bay Area)	KMVQ-FM	99.7	FM	Top 40
San Francisco (Bay Area)	KKIQ	101.7	FM	Adult contemporary
San Francisco (Bay Area)	KBLX-FM	102.9	FM	Urban adult contemporary
San Francisco (Bay Area)	KEZR	106.5	FM	Adult Top 40
Bridgeport, Connecticut	WICC	600	AM	Talk
Bridgeport, Connecticut	WICC-FM	95.9	FM	Talk
Bridgeport, Connecticut	WEZN-FM	99.9	FM	Hot adult contemporary
Bridgeport, Connecticut	WEBE	107.9	FM	Adult contemporary
New Haven, Connecticut	WYBC-FM	94.3	FM	Urban adult contemporary
New Haven, Connecticut	WPLR	99.1	FM	Mainstream rock
Des Moines, Iowa	KCOB	1280	AM	Oldies
Des Moines, Iowa	KCOB-FM	95.9	FM	Country
Grinnell, Iowa	KGRN	1410	AM	Adult contemporary
Grinnell, Iowa	KRTI	106.7	FM	Hot adult contemporary
Fort Dodge, Iowa	KWMT	540	AM	Classic country
Fort Dodge, Iowa	KVFD	1400	AM	Talk
Fort Dodge, Iowa	KZLB	92.1	FM	Active rock
Fort Dodge, Iowa	KKEZ	94.5	FM	Hot adult contemporary
Fort Dodge, Iowa	KIAQ	96.9	FM	Country
Fort Dodge, Iowa	KXFT	99.7	FM	Adult contemporary
Fort Dodge, Iowa	KTLB	105.9	FM	Oldies
Mason City, Iowa	KGLO	1300	AM	News/talk
Mason City, Iowa	KRIB	1490	AM	Soft oldies/adult standards
Mason City, Iowa	KIAI	93.9	FM	Country
Mason City, Iowa	KYTC	102.7	FM	Classic hits
Mason City, Iowa	KLSS-FM	106.1	FM	Hot adult contemporary
Ottumwa, Iowa	KMCD	1570	AM	Classic country
Ottumwa, Iowa	KKFD-FM	95.9	FM	Classic hits
Chicago, Illinois	WJOL	1340	AM	News talk/sports
Chicago, Illinois	WERV-FM	95.9	FM	Classic alternative
Chicago, Illinois	WSSR	96.7	FM	Hot adult contemporary
Chicago, Illinois	WZSR	105.5	FM	Hot adult contemporary
Joliet, Illinois	WCCQ	98.3	FM	Country
Topeka, Kansas (pending sale to MSC Radio Group)	WIBW	580	AM	Talk/sports
Topeka, Kansas (pending sale to MSC Radio Group)	WIBW-FM	94.5	FM	Country
Topeka, Kansas (pending sale to MSC Radio Group)	KSAJ-FM	98.5	FM	Adult hits
Topeka, Kansas (pending sale to MSC Radio Group)	KTPK	106.9	FM	Classic country
Louisville, Kentucky	WGZB-FM	96.5	FM	Mainstream urban
Louisville, Kentucky	WDJX	99.7	FM	Contemporary hit radio
Louisville, Kentucky	WMJM	101.3	FM	Urban adult contemporary
Louisville, Kentucky	WXMA	102.3	FM	Adult contemporary
Louisville, Kentucky	WGHL	105.1	FM	Alternative rock
Shreveport–Bossier City, Louisiana	KOKA	980	AM	Urban gospel
Shreveport–Bossier City, Louisiana	KLKL	95.7	FM	Classic hits
Shreveport–Bossier City, Louisiana	KTAL-FM	98.1	FM	Classic rock
Shreveport–Bossier City, Louisiana	KDKS-FM	102.1	FM	Urban adult contemporary
Shreveport–Bossier City, Louisiana	KBTT	103.7	FM	Mainstream urban
Hagerstown, Maryland	WCHA	800	AM	Oldies
Hagerstown, Maryland	WHAG	1410	AM	Oldies
Hagerstown, Maryland	WQCM	94.3	FM	Classic rock
Hagerstown, Maryland	WIKZ	95.1	FM	Hot adult contemporary
Hagerstown, Maryland	WDLD	96.7	FM	Rhythmic contemporary
Saginaw–Bay City–Midland, Michigan	WSGW	790	AM	News/talk
Saginaw–Bay City–Midland, Michigan	WCEN-FM	94.5	FM	Country
Saginaw–Bay City–Midland, Michigan	WSGW-FM	100.5	FM	News/talk
Saginaw–Bay City–Midland, Michigan	WGER	106.3	FM	Classic alternative
Saginaw–Bay City–Midland, Michigan	WTLZ	107.1	FM	Urban adult contemporary
Albert Lea–Austin, Minnesota	KATE	1450	AM	News/talk/soft oldies
Albert Lea–Austin, Minnesota	KAUS	1480	AM	News/talk
Albert Lea–Austin, Minnesota	KCPI	94.9	FM	Adult contemporary
Albert Lea–Austin, Minnesota	KAUS-FM	99.9	FM	Country
Mankato, Minnesota	KMKO-FM	95.7	FM	Active rock
Mankato, Minnesota	KEEZ-FM	99.1	FM	Hot adult contemporary
Mankato, Minnesota	KYSM-FM	103.5	FM	Country
Mankato, Minnesota	KRBI-FM	105.5	FM	Classic hits
Redwood Falls, Minnesota	KLGR	1490	AM	Country
Redwood Falls, Minnesota	KLGR-FM	97.7	FM	Adult hits
Bethany, Missouri	KAAN	870	AM	Sports
Bethany, Missouri	KAAN-FM	95.5	FM	Country
Columbia, Missouri	KWIX	1230	AM	Talk
Columbia, Missouri	KWIX-FM	92.5	FM	Talk
Columbia, Missouri	KRES	104.7	FM	Classic country
Farmington, Missouri	KREI	800	AM	Talk
Kansas City, Missouri	KMRN	1360	AM	Classic country
Kansas City, Missouri	KKWK	100.1	FM	Classic rock
Moberly, Missouri	KTCM	97.3	FM	Contemporary Christian music
Moberly, Missouri	KIRK	99.9	FM	Classic hits
St. Louis, Missouri	KJFF	1400	AM	News/talk
St. Louis, Missouri	KTJJ	98.5	FM	Country
Springfield, Missouri	KBNN	750	AM	News/talk
Springfield, Missouri	KJEL	103.7	FM	Country
Waynesville, Missouri	KIIK	1270	AM	Talk
Waynesville, Missouri	KJPW	1390	AM	News/talk
Waynesville, Missouri	KFBD-FM	97.9	FM	Adult contemporary
Waynesville, Missouri	KOZQ-FM	102.3	FM	Classic rock
Jackson, Mississippi	WJNT	1180	AM	News/talk
Jackson, Mississippi	WOAD	1300	AM	Urban gospel
Jackson, Mississippi	WJQS	1400	AM	Sports
Jackson, Mississippi	WJMI	99.7	FM	Mainstream urban
Jackson, Mississippi	WRKS	105.9	FM	Sports
Jackson, Mississippi	WKXI-FM	107.5	FM	Urban adult contemporary
Columbus, Nebraska	KJSK	900	AM	News/talk
Columbus, Nebraska	KTTT	1510	AM	Classic country
Columbus, Nebraska	KKOT	93.5	FM	Classic hits
Columbus, Nebraska	KZEN	100.3	FM	Country
Columbus, Nebraska	KLIR	101.1	FM	Adult contemporary
Lincoln, Nebraska	KFOR	1240	AM	News/talk
Lincoln, Nebraska	KTGL	92.9	FM	Classic rock
Lincoln, Nebraska	KIBZ	104.1	FM	Active rock
Lincoln, Nebraska	KFRX	106.3	FM	Contemporary hit radio
Lincoln, Nebraska	KZKX	96.9	FM	Country
Long Island, New York	WHLI	1100	AM	Oldies
Long Island, New York	WWSK	94.3	FM	Mainstream rock
Long Island, New York	WALK-FM	97.5	FM	Hot adult contemporary
Long Island, New York	WKJY	98.3	FM	Adult contemporary
Long Island, New York	WWWF-FM	103.1	FM	Country
Canton–Akron, Ohio	WHBC	1480	AM	Talk/sports
Canton–Akron, Ohio	WHBC-FM	94.1	FM	Hot adult contemporary
Dayton, Ohio	WING	1410	AM	Sports
Dayton, Ohio	WROU-FM	92.1	FM	Urban adult contemporary
Dayton, Ohio	WGTZ	92.9	FM	Classic hits
Dayton, Ohio	WCLI-FM	101.5	FM	Alternative rock
Dayton, Ohio	WDHT	102.9	FM	Urban/rhythmic contemporary
Portland, Oregon	KXTG	750	AM	Sports
Portland, Oregon	KUFO	970	AM	Talk
Portland, Oregon	KBFF	95.5	FM	Contemporary hit radio
Portland, Oregon	KUPL	98.7	FM	Country
Portland, Oregon	KXL-FM	101.1	FM	News/talk
Portland, Oregon	KINK	101.9	FM	Adult album alternative
Columbia, South Carolina	WARQ	93.5	FM	Contemporary hit radio
Columbia, South Carolina	WSCZ	93.9	FM	Mainstream urban
Columbia, South Carolina	WWDM	101.3	FM	Urban adult contemporary
Columbia, South Carolina	WFOX	102.3	FM	Classic rock
Columbia, South Carolina	WHXT	103.9	FM	Mainstream urban
Brookings, South Dakota (pending sale to local employees)	KJJQ	910	AM	Classic country
Brookings, South Dakota (pending sale to local employees)	KBRK	1430	AM	Adult standards
Brookings, South Dakota (pending sale to local employees)	KBRK-FM	93.7	FM	Hot adult contemporary
Brookings, South Dakota (pending sale to local employees)	KDBX	107.1	FM	Classic rock
Watertown, South Dakota	KWAT	950	AM	Full-service
Watertown, South Dakota	KSDR	1480	AM	News/talk
Watertown, South Dakota	KSDR-FM	92.9	FM	Country
Watertown, South Dakota	KIXX	96.1	FM	Hot adult contemporary
Watertown, South Dakota	KDLO-FM	96.9	FM	Classic country
Watertown, South Dakota	KKSD	104.3	FM	Classic hits
Amarillo, Texas	KGNC	710	AM	News/talk
Amarillo, Texas	KGNC-FM	97.9	FM	Country
Amarillo, Texas	KXGL	100.9	FM	Classic hits
Amarillo, Texas	KVWE	102.9	FM	Classic rock
Lubbock, Texas	KLLL-FM	96.3	FM	Country
Lubbock, Texas	KMMX	100.3	FM	Contemporary hit radio
Lubbock, Texas	KONE	101.1	FM	Classic rock
Lubbock, Texas	KBTE	104.9	FM	Rhythmic contemporary
San Antonio, Texas	KTSA	550	AM	News/talk
San Antonio, Texas	KSAH	720	AM	Regional Mexican
San Antonio, Texas	KZDC	1250	AM	Sports
San Antonio, Texas	KTFM	94.1	FM	Sports
San Antonio, Texas	KLEY-FM	95.7	FM	Tejano
San Antonio, Texas	KJXK	102.7	FM	Adult hits
San Antonio, Texas	KSAH-FM	104.1	FM	Regional Mexican
Sherman, Texas	KMKT	93.1	FM	Country
Sherman, Texas	KLAK	97.5	FM	Adult contemporary
Tyler–Longview, Texas	KOYE	96.7	FM	Regional Mexican
Tyler–Longview, Texas	KKUS	104.1	FM	Classic country
Tyler–Longview, Texas	KYKX	105.7	FM	Country
Tyler–Longview, Texas	KOOI	106.5	FM	Adult hits
Tyler–Longview, Texas	KTLH	107.9	FM	Regional Mexican
Salt Lake City, Utah	KDUT	102.3	FM	Regional Mexican
Salt Lake City, Utah	KBMG	106.3	FM	Contemporary hit radio/Latin pop/reggaeton/tropical music
Fredericksburg, Virginia	WNTX	1350	AM	News/talk/sports
Fredericksburg, Virginia	WFLS-FM	93.3	FM	Country
Fredericksburg, Virginia	WWUZ	96.9	FM	Classic rock
Fredericksburg, Virginia	WVBX	99.3	FM	Contemporary hit radio
Aberdeen, Washington	KXRO	1320	AM	News/talk
Aberdeen, Washington	KWOK	1490	AM	Sports
Aberdeen, Washington	KXXK	95.3	FM	Country
Aberdeen, Washington	KDUX-FM	104.7	FM	Classic rock
Moses Lake, Washington	KWIQ	1020	AM	Sports
Moses Lake, Washington	KWIQ-FM	100.5	FM	Country
Wenatchee, Washington	KKRT	900	AM	Sports
Wenatchee, Washington	KKRV	104.7	FM	Country
Wilson Creek, Washington	KWLN	103.3	FM	Spanish
Kenosha, Wisconsin	WLIP	1050	AM	Talk/full-service
Kenosha, Wisconsin	WKRS	1220	AM	Spanish sports
Kenosha, Wisconsin	WXLC	102.3	FM	Country
Kenosha, Wisconsin	WIIL	95.1	FM	Active rock
