= KDUT =

Radio station Randolph, Utah

- Randolph, Utah; United States
- Broadcast area: Salt Lake City
- Frequency: 102.3 MHz
- Branding: La Gran D 102.3

Programming
- Format: Regional Mexican

Ownership
- Owner: Connoisseur Media; (Alpha Media Licensee LLC)
- Sister stations: KBMG

History
- First air date: 2000 (as KWKD)
- Former call signs: KWKD (2000–2003); KMDG (2003–2004)

Technical information
- Licensing authority: FCC
- Facility ID: 88272
- Class: C
- ERP: 89,000 watts
- HAAT: 647 meters (2,123 ft)
- Transmitter coordinates: 40°52′15.8″N 110°59′45.6″W

Links
- Public license information: Public file; LMS
- Webcast: Listen live
- Website: www.lagrandsaltlake.com

KDUT (102.3 FM) is a radio station broadcasting a regional Mexican format. Licensed to Randolph, Utah, United States, the station serves the Salt Lake City area. The station is owned by Connoisseur Media.

== History ==
=== Active rock (1999–2004) ===
The station went on the air as KAIO on January 22, 1999. On December 21, 1999, the station changed its call sign to KWKD and began airing an Active Rock format branding itself as The Blaze. On December 20, 2003, it became KMDG, branding itself as Mad Dog 102.3, still with an active rock format.

=== Spanish (2004–present) ===
On April 3, 2004, the KDUT call letters were put in place.

Bustos Media used to own the station. In September 2010, Bustos transferred most of its licenses to Adelante Media Group as part of a settlement with its lenders. Alpha Media bought Adelante's Salt Lake City stations for $3.15 million on July 16, 2015. Alpha Media merged with Connoisseur Media on September 4, 2025.
