= KLAK =

Radio station in Tom Bean, Texas

Coordinates: 33.475°N 96.446°W

- Tom Bean, Texas; United States
- Broadcast area: Northeast Dallas–Fort Worth metroplex; McKinney–Sherman–Durant, Oklahoma
- Frequency: 97.5 MHz
- Branding: 97.5 K-Lake

Programming
- Language: English
- Format: Classic Hits

Ownership
- Owner: Connoisseur Media; (Connoisseur Media, LLC.)
- Sister stations: KMKT

History
- First air date: October 17, 1983 (at 104.9)
- Former frequencies: 104.9 MHz (1983–1987)
- Call sign meaning: Lake Texoma

Technical information
- Licensing authority: FCC
- Facility ID: 36265
- Class: C2
- ERP: 32,000 watts
- HAAT: 617 feet (188 meters)

Links
- Public license information: Public file; LMS
- Webcast: Listen Live
- Website: klake.com

KLAK (97.5 FM) is a Connoisseur Media radio station licensed to Tom Bean, Texas, serving the Texoma region and the northeast portions of the Dallas–Fort Worth metroplex. The station broadcasts a Classic Hits format. The station's studios are located in McKinney, Texas, with its transmitter southeast of Tom Bean.

== History ==
KLAK started broadcasting on the 104.9 FM frequency on October 17, 1983, licensed to Denison, Texas, as a soft adult contemporary format branded as K-LAKE 105. It moved to its present 97.5 FM frequency on May 12, 1987, and was renamed as 97.5 K-LAKE FM. The station rebranded as 97.5 KLAK in 2006.

In November 2016, KLAK expanded towards a variety hits format with the addition of more Hot AC songs. Four years later, KLAK gradually evolved to Hot AC full-time. This lasted for almost two years until August 30, 2022, when the station began stunting with station identifications and TM Studios jingles with the background of radio static for a short time, which led to the station's return to its "K-Lake" name and normal adult contemporary format.

On August 3, 2026, as a strategy to add Throwback Nation to a trio of Connoisseur Media radio stations including KRBI and KYTC, KLAK moved its format to classic hits, eliminating songs from the 2000s and later and only playing classic hits music from the 70s, 80s, and 90s.

== Programming ==
Besides music, KLAK's programming consists of talk shows (through Westwood One) and sports. The Sandy Show broadcasts every weekday morning at 5 am-9 am while Alan Freemont broadcasts at 2pm-6pm weekdays. KLAK airs McKinney ISD high school football broadcasts on Thursday and Friday evenings during the high school football season.
