= KCLZ =

Radio station in Twentynine Palms, California

Simulcasting KCLB-FM Coachella
- Twentynine Palms, California; United States
- Broadcast area: Palm Springs
- Frequency: 95.5 MHz
- Branding: 93.7 KCLB

Programming
- Format: Mainstream rock

Ownership
- Owner: Connoisseur Media; (Alpha Media Licensee LLC)
- Sister stations: KCLB-FM; KDES-FM; KDGL; KKUU; KNWZ; KPSI-FM

History
- First air date: October 20, 2011
- Former call signs: KKCM (2011); KQCM (2011–2014)
- Call sign meaning: similar to KCLB

Technical information
- Licensing authority: FCC
- Facility ID: 183327
- Class: A
- ERP: 3,800 watts
- HAAT: 70 meters (230 ft)
- Transmitter coordinates: 34°9′16″N 116°12′7″W

Links
- Public license information: Public file; LMS
- Webcast: Listen live
- Website: 937kclb.com

KCLZ (95.5 FM) is a radio station broadcasting a mainstream rock music format, simulcasting KCLB-FM (93.7) from Coachella. Licensed to Twentynine Palms, California, United States, the station is owned by Connoisseur Media, through licensee Alpha Media Licensee LLC.

== History ==
The Federal Communications Commission (FCC) issued a construction permit for the station to Desert Willow Broadcasters on February 5, 1993. The station was assigned the call sign KHWX on March 12, 1993, and changed its call sign to KKJT on July 22, 1994. The station received its license to cover on October 21, 1996. On October 6, 1997, the station's license was assigned by Desert Willow to Three D Radio, Inc. On January 26, 1999, the station changed its call sign to KDHI. Following a bankruptcy filing by Three D, the station's license was assigned on July 6, 2004, to Copper Mountain Broadcasting. The price for the transaction, which included the license for sister station KKJT, was $350,000. The station changed its call sign to the current KCLZ on January 3, 2014.

On October 20, 2011, KQCM and its CHR format moved from 92.1 FM in Joshua Tree (which became KKCM, simulcasting country-formatted KXCM) to a new facility on 95.5 FM in Twentynine Palms.

On January 1, 2014, KQCM and its CHR format moved to 105.3 FM (formerly talk-formatted KRSX-FM), while the 95.5 FM frequency became a simulcast of mainstream rock-formatted KCLB-FM under new calls, KCLZ.

On May 21, 2015, Morris Communications' MCC Radio, LLC closed on its acquisition of KCLZ in exchange for KFSQ. Morris Communications sold KCLZ and thirty-two other stations to Alpha Media LLC effective September 1, 2015, at a purchase price of $38.25 million. Alpha Media merged with Connoisseur Media on September 4, 2025.
