= Mike Freedman =

Michael Freedman has won nine Emmy Awards. His career at ABC began in 1948 and he "pioneered the use of live, hand-held video cameras for network coverage of news and sporting events."
