= Madiha Kotb =

Engineer

Madiha El Mehelmy Kotb (born 1953) is an Egyptian-born Canadian mechanical and consulting engineer and former executive at the Régie du Bâtiment du Québec (RBQ), who served as 132nd president of the American Society of Mechanical Engineers in 2013–2014.

== Biography ==
Born in Giza, Egypt, Kotb attended the Lycée Français du Caire, and studied materials engineering at The American University in Cairo in the early 1970s. In 1974 she moved to Canada, where she continued her studies in Montreal, Quebec at the Concordia University, where she obtained her BSc in mechanical engineering in 1976, and in 1980 her MSc in mechanical engineering in 1981.

In 1980 Kotb joined the workforce. In the 1990s she joined the Régie du bâtiment, the engineering safety watchdog of the Government of Quebec, where she eventually headed of the Pressure vessel Technical Services Division.

From 1989 to 2015 Kotb also served on the Canadian National Board of Boilers and Pressure Vessels Inspectors, and in the year 2013-2014 she served as 132nd president of the American Society of Mechanical Engineers (ASME).

Kotb was the 2024 recipient of the Ralph Coats Roe Medal of the ASME.

== Selected publications ==
- Kotb, Madiha Mahmoud, Bounce response of Canadian MAGLEV vehicle under periodic and stochastic excitations from the guideways. Masters thesis, Concordia University, 1980.

Articles, a selection

- Kotb, Madiha El Mehelmy. "An Ability to Adapt and Change." Mechanical Engineering, 136.11 (2014): 36–37.
