= BMP Radio =

Mexican-American radio broadcasting company

BMP Radio, also known as Border Media Partners, was a privately owned Hispanic focused radio broadcasting company headquartered in Houston, Texas. On July 17, 2009, Radio-Info.com announced that BMP would be seized by its banks after failing to make debt payments for two years. Ten days later, it was confirmed that Goldman Sachs Group, Vestar Capital Partners, and D.B. Zwirn & Co. seized the business and the assets are expected to be liquidated. It was reported that President Jeff Hinson was expected to step down by July 31. This occurred as expected, and station owner and station broker Larry Patrick was named trustee and engaged to dispose of the stations and return any monies to the lenders.

During the 2009 Texas Association of Broadcasters meeting in Austin, Texas it was reported that the McAllen and Laredo area stations would be assigned to a U.S. affiliate of the companies that own the Mexican stations programmed by BMP; this happened in 2012 when the stations were sold to R Communications. The stations in Waco were sold to the Bill McCutcheon interests, while REO Radio Group acquired its stations in Austin.

In October 2013, the last of BMP, the cluster in San Antonio, was sold to Larry Wilson's L&L Broadcasting for $31M.
