= KKFD-FM =

Radio station in Fairfield, Iowa

Currently silent
- Fairfield, Iowa; United States
- Broadcast area: Ottumwa, Iowa
- Frequency: 95.9 MHz
- Branding: Classic 96

Programming
- Format: Classic hits

Ownership
- Owner: Connoisseur Media; (Alpha Media Licensee LLC)
- Sister stations: KMCD

History
- First air date: 1976
- Last air date: 2026
- Former call signs: KBCT (1976–1987); KMCD-FM (1987–1989); KIIK-FM (1989–2007)

Technical information
- Licensing authority: FCC
- Facility ID: 23037
- Class: A
- ERP: 4,100 watts
- HAAT: 122 meters (400 ft)
- Transmitter coordinates: 40°58′47″N 92°5′45.6″W

Links
- Public license information: Public file; LMS
- Webcast: Listen live
- Website: www.exploreseiowa.com/Classic-96/7361624

KKFD-FM (95.9 FM, "Classic 96") was a radio station broadcasting a classic hits music format. Licensed to Fairfield, Iowa, United States, the station is owned by Connoisseur Media, through licensee Alpha Media Licensee LLC.

On March 31, 2026, KKFD-FM ceased operations and went silent.
