= WWNG =

Radio station in North Carolina, United States

- Havelock, North Carolina; United States
- Frequency: 1330 kHz
- Branding: The Memories Station

Programming
- Format: Defunct (formerly adult standards/MOR)
- Affiliations: Westwood One

Ownership
- Owner: Dick Broadcasting; (Dick Broadcasting Company, Inc. of Tennessee)

History
- First air date: June 16, 1962
- Last air date: February 22, 2018 (date of license surrender)
- Former call signs: WUSM (1961–1969); WKVO (1969–1978); WCPQ (1978–1999); WANG (1999–2017)

Technical information
- Facility ID: 47108
- Class: D
- Power: 1000 watts (day only)
- Transmitter coordinates: 34°55′23.00″N 76°56′37.00″W

WWNG (1330 AM) was a radio station broadcasting an adult standards/MOR format to the Havelock, North Carolina, United States area. The station was owned by Dick Broadcasting, through licensee Dick Broadcasting Company, Inc. of Tennessee. WWNG was limited to daytime operation only.

In September 2017, Dick Broadcasting announced the purchase of Alpha Media stations in three markets — 18 stations and two translators in total, at a purchase price of $19.5 million. The acquisition of WANG by Dick Broadcasting was consummated on December 20, 2017, at which point the station changed its call sign to WWNG. Dick Broadcasting surrendered WWNG's license on February 22, 2018, and it was cancelled by the Federal Communications Commission on February 23, 2018.
