= KRTI =

Radio station in Grinnell, Iowa

Coordinates: 41°48′15.9″N 92°40′9.6″W

Newton-Grinnell, Iowa United States
- Grinnell, Iowa; United States
- Broadcast area: Marshalltown, Iowa; Pella, Iowa; Newton, Iowa; Marengo, Iowa; Newton, Iowa
- Frequency: 106.7 MHz
- Branding: Energy 106.7

Programming
- Format: Hot adult contemporary

Ownership
- Owner: Riverfront Broadcasting of Iowa; (Riverfront Broadcasting LLC)
- Sister stations: KGRN, KCOB (AM), KCOB-FM

History
- First air date: 1993

Technical information
- Licensing authority: FCC
- Facility ID: 35564
- Class: C2
- ERP: 50,000 watts
- HAAT: 150 meters (490 ft)

Links
- Public license information: Public file; LMS
- Webcast: https://stream.aiir.com/o0psso2ifvzuv
- Website: iowaradio.us/krti

KRTI is a radio station airing a hot adult contemporary format licensed to Grinnell, Iowa, broadcasting on 106.7 FM. The station serves the areas of Grinnell, Marshalltown, Pella, Newton, Marengo, and Newton, and is owned by Connoisseur Media, through licensee Alpha Media Licensee LLC.

On June9, 2026, KRTI went silent.

Return to the Airwaves on October 15th, 2026 at 6 am central time under new ownership from Riverfront Broadcasting of Iowa.
