= KBMG =

Radio station in Evanston, Wyoming

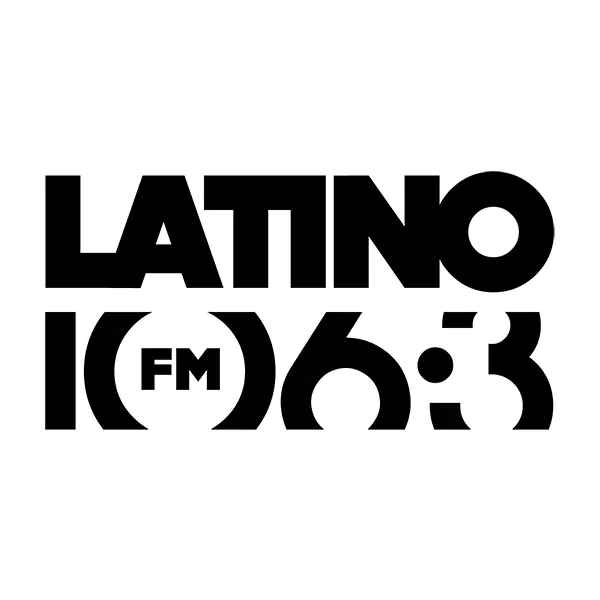
- Evanston, Wyoming; United States
- Broadcast area: Southwestern Wyoming; Wasatch Front (Salt Lake City, Ogden and Provo)
- Frequency: 106.3 MHz
- Branding: Latino 106.3

Programming
- Language: Spanish
- Format: Contemporary hit radio; Latin pop; reggaeton; tropical music
- Affiliations: Real Salt Lake

Ownership
- Owner: Connoisseur Media; (Alpha Media Licensee LLC)
- Sister stations: KDUT

History
- First air date: 1981
- Former call signs: KOTB (1981–2004); KRMF (2004–2005)
- Former frequencies: 106.3 MHz (1985–1997); 106.1 MHz (1997–2015)

Technical information
- Licensing authority: FCC
- Facility ID: 20029
- Class: C
- ERP: 89,000 watts
- HAAT: 647 meters (2,123 ft)
- Transmitter coordinates: 40°52′15.8″N 110°59′45.6″W

Links
- Public license information: Public file; LMS
- Webcast: Listen live
- Website: latinosaltlake.com

KBMG (106.3 FM) is a radio station broadcasting a Spanish-language contemporary hits format as "Latino 106.3". Licensed to Evanston, Wyoming, United States, it serves southwestern Wyoming and the Wasatch Front area. The station is owned by Connoisseur Media. Its studios are located in Downtown Salt Lake City and its transmitter site is located atop Humpy Peak in Summit County, Utah.

== History ==
The station, originally broadcasting on 106.1 FM, went on the air as KOTB on December 28, 1981, and primarily served the community of Evanston, Wyoming, with a full-service format, playing adult contemporary music, airing local news updates, and some local high school and University of Wyoming Cowboys sports.

On September 23, 2004, the station changed its call sign to KRMF and on March 30, 2005, to the current KBMG when the station relaunched with on-channel boosters covering the Wasatch Front. The station aired Bustos Media's "Magia" (Spanish adult contemporary) format. In September 2010, Bustos transferred most of its licenses to Adelante Media Group as part of a settlement with its lenders. who then switched the station to Spanish-language adult hits "Juan". One year later, the station rebranded as "Latino" in September 2011.

Former logo

Alpha Media] bought Adelante's Salt Lake City stations for $3.15 million on July 16, 2015. KBMG moved back to 106.3 FM on September 23, and was licensed to operate on that frequency on October 8.

On May 5, 2025, Connoisseur Media announced that it would acquire Alpha Media and began managing its stations under a local marketing agreement. The merger was completed on September 4, 2025.
