= KGRN =

Radio station in Grinnell, Iowa

Newton-Grinnell, Iowa United States
- Grinnell, Iowa; United States
- Frequency: 1410 kHz C-QUAM AM Stereo
- Branding: KGRN 1410 AM

Programming
- Format: Adult contemporary
- Affiliations: Fox News Radio, Westwood One

Ownership
- Owner: Riverfront Broadcasting of Iowa; (Riverfront Broadcasting LLC)
- Sister stations: KRTI, KCOB (AM),KCOB-FM

History
- First air date: November 15, 1957

Technical information
- Licensing authority: FCC
- Facility ID: 43242
- Class: D
- Power: 500 watts day; 47 watts night
- Transmitter coordinates: 41°44′40″N 92°42′21.7″W

Links
- Public license information: Public file; LMS
- Webcast: Listen live
- Website: iowaradio.us/kgrn/

KGRN (1410 AM) is a radio station broadcasting an adult contemporary format. Serving the Grinnell, Iowa, United States, area, the station started broadcasting on November 15, 1957 and was last owned and operated by Connoisseur Media, through licensee Alpha Media Licensee LLC, and featured local oriented programming with news, weather, sports, ag-related programming, and adult contemporary music.

On June 9, 2026, KGRN went silent.

Return to the Airwaves on October 15th, 2026 under new ownership from Riverfront Broadcasting of Iowa.
