= KMKT =

Radio station in Bells, Texas

Coordinates: 33.692°N 96.444°W

- Bells, Texas; United States
- Broadcast area: Sherman–Denison area
- Frequency: 93.1 MHz
- Branding: 93.1 Katy Country

Programming
- Format: Country

Ownership
- Owner: Connoisseur Media; (Connoisseur Media, LLC.)
- Sister stations: KLAK

History
- First air date: 1987 in Denison, Texas
- Call sign meaning: Missouri–Kansas–Texas Railroad

Technical information
- Licensing authority: FCC
- Class: C3
- Power: 6,800 watts
- HAAT: 191

Links
- Public license information: Public file; LMS
- Website: 931kmkt.com

KMKT (93.1 MHz; Katy Country) is a Connoisseur Media FM radio station, serving Lake Texoma with a country format.

== History ==
KMKT got its start on frequency 104.9 FM in the North Texas region after its sister station KLAK moved to Durant, Oklahoma 1987.

It was first branded as "Katy Klassics" (the initials are a reference to the Missouri–Kansas–Texas Railroad, commonly called the "Katy" railroad), then "Katy Oldies" a year later. The 104.9 frequency went dark for 6 years starting in 1990, but later reestablished as KZMP. The KMKT call letters were revived for a new station licensed to Bells, TX on 93.1 MHz starting in 1996. The new station has run a country format since it came on the air.

The KMKT studios, production facilities and business offices are located at One Grand Centre, 1800 Teague Drive (Suite 300) in Sherman, TX.
