= KWIQ (AM) =

Radio station in Moses Lake North, Washington

Simulcasting KKRT, Wenatchee
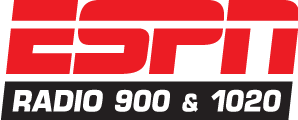
- Moses Lake North, Washington; United States
- Broadcast area: Moses Lake, Washington
- Frequency: 1020 kHz
- Branding: ESPN Radio 900 & 1020

Programming
- Format: Sports
- Affiliations: ESPN Radio; Seattle Mariners Radio Network; Washington-Learfield Sports Network (Football); Gonzaga-Learfield Sports Network (Men's basketball)

Ownership
- Owner: Connoisseur Media; (Alpha Media Licensee LLC)
- Sister stations: KWIQ-FM; KWLN

History
- First air date: 1956

Technical information
- Licensing authority: FCC
- Facility ID: 35886
- Class: B
- Power: 2,000 watts day; 400 watts night
- Transmitter coordinates: 47°9′47.5″N 119°21′43.1″W

Links
- Public license information: Public file; LMS
- Webcast: www.alphamediaplayer.com/kkrt
- Website: Listen live

KWIQ (1020 kHz) is an AM radio station broadcasting a sports format to the Moses Lake North, Washington, United States, area. The station is owned by Connoisseur Media and features programming from ESPN Radio.

During daytime broadcast hours, the station's antenna system uses two towers arranged in a directional array that concentrates the signal toward the northeast. At nighttime, only one of the towers is used, resulting in an omnidirectional pattern. According to the Antenna Structure Registration database, each of the towers is 75 m (246 ft) tall. The transmitter and antenna array are located on the west side of Moses Lake near North Westshore Drive.
