= KLGR (AM) =

Radio station in Redwood Falls, Minnesota

- Redwood Falls, Minnesota; United States
- Frequency: 1490 kHz
- Branding: KLGR 1490 AM/95.9 FM

Programming
- Language: English
- Format: Country music
- Affiliations: ABC News Radio

Ownership
- Owner: Connoisseur Media; (Alpha 3E Licensee LLC)
- Sister stations: KLGR-FM

History
- First air date: 1954

Technical information
- Licensing authority: FCC
- Facility ID: 9680
- Class: C
- Power: 1,000 watts (unlimited)
- Transmitter coordinates: 44°32′32.9″N 95°7′58″W
- Translator: 95.9 K240DJ (Redwood Falls)

Links
- Public license information: Public file; LMS
- Webcast: Listen live; Listen live (via Audacy)
- Website: myklgr.com

KLGR (1490 AM) is a radio station licensed to Redwood Falls, Minnesota, United States. The station broadcasts a country music format and is owned by Connoisseur Media, through licensee Alpha 3E Licensee LLC. The station is also heard on 95.9 FM, through a translator in Redwood Falls, Minnesota.

== Translator ==
Broadcast translator for KLGR
Call sign	Frequency	City of license	FID	ERP (W)	HAAT	Class	FCC info
K240DJ	95.9 FM	Redwood Falls, Minnesota	140737	250	54 m (177 ft)	D	LMS
