= KCOB (AM) =

Radio station in Newton, Iowa

Newton-Grinnell, Iowa United States
- Newton, Iowa; United States
- Broadcast area: Des Moines metropolitan area
- Frequency: 1280 kHz

Programming
- Format: Oldies

Ownership
- Owner: Riverfront Broadcasting of Iowa; (Riverfront Broadcasting LLC)
- Sister stations: KRTI, KGRN, KCOB-FM

History
- First air date: September 15, 1955

Technical information
- Licensing authority: FCC
- Facility ID: 9900
- Class: D
- Power: 730 watts (daytime); 19 watts (nighttime)
- Transmitter coordinates: 41°44′11″N 93°1′12.7″W

Links
- Public license information: Public file; LMS
- Webcast: https://stream.aiir.com/od2sb88tjydvv
- Website: iowaradio.us/kcob-am/

KCOB (1280 AM) is a commercial radio station that serves the community of Newton, Iowa. The station primarily broadcasts an oldies format, but also provides local and national news, weather and sports. KCOB is owned by Connoisseur Media, through licensee Alpha Media Licensee LLC.

The station also broadcasts St. Louis Cardinals baseball games, as well as Newton High School football and basketball games.

== History ==
KCOB began broadcasting on September 15, 1955. For many years, the station was part of the Alpha Media portfolio after being acquired in 2015. In a major regional shift in 2025, Connoisseur Media acquired KCOB along with dozens of other Alpha Media stations across the Midwest. The sale was approved by the FCC in August 2025 and officially closed on September 4, 2025. In May 2024, the station faced community backlash when long-time local personalities were replaced with syndicated satellite programming.

on June 9, 2026, KCOB went off the air.

Return to the Airwaves on October 15th, 2026 at 6 am central time under new ownership from Riverfront Broadcasting of Iowa.
