= KDGL =

Radio station in Yucca Valley, California

- Yucca Valley, California; United States
- Broadcast area: Coachella Valley
- Frequency: 106.9 MHz
- Branding: The Eagle 106.9

Programming
- Format: Classic hits
- Affiliations: Compass Media Networks; Premiere Networks; United Stations Radio Networks; Coachella Valley Firebirds

Ownership
- Owner: Connoisseur Media; (Alpha Media Licensee LLC)
- Sister stations: KCLB-FM; KCLZ; KDES-FM; KKUU; KNWZ; KPSI-FM

History
- First air date: August 1988
- Former call signs: KROR (1984–1994); KNWZ-FM (1994–1996); KSES (1996–1998); KYOR-FM (2/1998-3/1998); KYOR (1998–2004)
- Call sign meaning: "The Eagle"

Technical information
- Licensing authority: FCC
- Facility ID: 14058
- Class: B
- ERP: 4,000 watts
- HAAT: 418 meters (1,371 ft)
- Transmitter coordinates: 34°4′55″N 116°20′35″W
- Repeater: 106.9 KDGL-FM1 (Palm Springs)

Links
- Public license information: Public file; LMS
- Webcast: Listen live
- Website: www.theeagle1069.com

KDGL (106.9 FM, "The Eagle") is a classic hits radio station serving the Coachella Valley and Morongo Basin markets of inland Southern California.

KDGL's studios are located at 1321 North Gene Autry Trail in Palm Springs, California. KDGL's main transmitter is located on the southeast corner of Yucca Valley, California, just north of Joshua Tree National Park.

== History ==
KDGL began broadcasting as KROR, a country music–formatted station, in August 1988. It was originally owned by Corinthians XIII Broadcasting Company. The next year, it was approved to expand to two translators on 92.1 (Note: Changed to 94.3 MHz as K232CX in 1994.) and 103.9 MHz, improving its coverage of the Coachella Valley from sites on Snow Peak and Edom Hill.

In 1994, KROR was purchased by the owners of KNWZ (1270 AM) to be converted to an FM simulcast of news/talk station K-News. The simulcast was split for Anaheim Angels baseball broadcasts, which were only heard on AM. In 1996, KNWZ-FM dropped the simulcast and became KSES with a dance adult contemporary format branded as "Kiss FM."

Morris Communications acquired KSES and KNWZ from Country Club Communications in 1997. This was one of four simultaneous transactions that created a seven-station radio cluster known as the Desert Radio Group. KSES stunted with a country-oriented Christmas format at the end of 1997. As part of moves within the new Desert Radio Group cluster to reduce duplication among formats, KSES was flipped to adult contemporary under new KYOR call letters in March 1998.

In 2004, KYOR changed call signs to KDGL and adopted its present name and classic hits format. The last of the translators, K280CV (103.9 FM), was split off as a separate program service in 2012. All 34 Morris radio stations were acquired by Alpha Media in 2015. Alpha Media merged with Connoisseur Media on September 4, 2025.
