= KCOB-FM =

Radio station in Newton, Iowa

Newton-Grinnell, Iowa United States
- Newton, Iowa; United States
- Broadcast area: Des Moines metropolitan area
- Frequency: 95.9 MHz

Programming
- Format: Country

Ownership
- Owner: Riverfront Broadcasting of Iowa; (Riverfront Broadcasting LLC)
- Sister stations: KCOB (AM), KRTI, KGRN

History
- First air date: January 3, 1969

Technical information
- Licensing authority: FCC
- Facility ID: 9899
- Class: A
- ERP: 5,100 watts
- HAAT: 108 meters (354 feet)
- Transmitter coordinates: 41°44′10.9″N 93°1′12.7″W

Links
- Public license information: Public file; LMS
- Webcast: https://stream.aiir.com/2i2s5ttv4xvvv
- Website: iowaradio.us/kcob-fm/

KCOB-FM (95.9 FM) is a commercial radio station that serves the community of Newton, Iowa. The station primarily broadcasts a country music format, but also provides local and national news, weather and sports. KCOB is owned by Connoisseur Media, through licensee Alpha Media Licensee LLC. The station also broadcasts St. Louis Cardinals baseball games, as well as the Newton High School football and basketball games.

On June 9, 2026, KCOB-FM went silent.

Return to the Airwaves on October 15th, 2026 at 6 am central time under new ownership from Riverfront Broadcasting of Iowa

== Technical parameters ==
The transmitter and broadcast tower are located north of Newton. According to the Antenna Structure Registration database, the tower is 93 metres (305 feet) tall with the FM broadcast antenna mounted at the 89 metres (292 feet) level. The calculated Height Above Average Terrain is 108 metres (354 feet). The tower is also used as the antenna system for its sister station, KCOB (AM).
