= KDES-FM =

Radio station in Cathedral City, California

Coordinates: 33.866°N 116.435°W

- Cathedral City, California; United States
- Broadcast area: Coachella Valley; Palm Springs
- Frequency: 98.5 MHz (HD Radio)
- Branding: "98.5 The Bull"

Programming
- Format: Country music
- Subchannels: HD2: Adult standards; "107.3 Mod FM"
- Affiliations: Premiere Networks

Ownership
- Owner: Connoisseur Media; (Alpha Media Licensee LLC)
- Sister stations: KCLB-FM; KCLZ; KDGL; KKUU; KNWZ; KPSI-FM

History
- First air date: 1969
- Former call signs: KWXY-FM (1969–2010)
- Call sign meaning: "Desert"

Technical information
- Licensing authority: FCC
- Facility ID: 24253
- Class: B
- ERP: 38,000 watts
- HAAT: 171 meters (561 ft)
- Translator: HD2: 107.3 K297BO (Palm Springs)

Links
- Public license information: Public file; LMS
- Webcast: Listen live; HD2: Listen live
- Website: www.985thebull.com; HD2: www.1073modfm.com

KDES-FM (98.5 MHz) is a radio station licensed to Cathedral City, California, and serving the Palm Springs–Coachella Valley area. The station's studios are located in Palm Springs. It's designed as an LP-1 of the Emergency Alert System for the Coachella Valley.

On September 9, 2015, shortly after being sold to Alpha Media, KDES-FM began simulcasting KDGL, with a change to country as "98.5 The Bull" to follow the next day. Alpha Media merged with Connoisseur Media on September 4, 2025.

== HD2 subchannel ==
KDES-FM airs an adult standards format branded "Mod FM" on its HD2 subchannel, which is also heard at 107.3 FM, through translator K297BO.

Broadcast translator for KDES-FM
Call sign	Frequency	City of license	FID	ERP (W)	HAAT	Class	FCC info
K297BO	107.3 FM	Palm Springs, California	143069	250	182.1 m (597 ft)	D	LMS
