= CBS News Weekend Roundup =

- Genre: News program
- Running time: 60 minutes (8:00 pm – 9:00 pm)
- Country of origin: United States
- Language: English
- Home station: CBS Radio Network
- Hosted by: Bill Lynch (2000–Early 2000s); Dan Raviv (Early 2000s–2017); Steve Dorsey (2017–2019); Allison Keyes (2019–2025)
- Created by: Mike Freedman
- Produced by: Charlie Kaye
- Executive producers: Mike Freedman; Howard Arenstein
- Recording studio: New York City (2000–Early 2000s); Washington, D.C. (Early 2000s–2025)
- Original release: January 2000 – December 27, 2025
- No. of episodes: 1,336+
- Opening theme: "CBS News Theme" by Antfood
- Sponsored by: Paramount+
- Podcast: feeds.cbsnews.com/podcast_weekend_1

The CBS News Weekend Roundup is a weekly news show that aired on CBS News Radio, designed for a one-hour time slot, though it had an actual length without commercials of about 40 minutes. It reviewed the previous week's news and provides insights on possible future developments in the United States and the world.

== Description ==
The show, produced Friday afternoons, aired on CBS News Radio affiliates on Saturdays and Sundays. It includes interviews with CBS News radio and TV correspondents and various newsmakers, compilations of reports through the week that have aired both on CBS-TV and CBS News Radio, as well as commentary from actor and TV personality Charles Grodin.

In addition, an ad-free podcast of the entire program was available from CBS News starting in early 2006, which was first distributed Friday afternoon.

During breaking news events on Fridays and Saturdays the program was updated to affiliate stations which had not aired the program yet to provide the updated information, and likewise the podcast feed.

The Weekend Roundup was anchored by the correspondent Allison Keyes in the CBS News Washington, D.C., bureau. Infinity Networks handled the distribution.

The broadcast aired weekly on the network since 2000. The network's then-news director, Mike Freedman, was the creator and first executive producer of the show, with Charlie Kaye as producer. Bill Lynch, former anchor of the CBS World News Roundup morning edition, was the first host of the Weekend Roundup, then based in New York.

Dan Raviv had a long tenure as anchor of the broadcast, with Washington, D.C., Bureau Chief Howard Arenstein serving as the executive producer and substitute anchor. Arenstein left CBS in late 2016 and Raviv quietly departed a few weeks later. Washington Executive Editor Steve Dorsey anchored for a few years until being replaced by Allison Keyes in 2019.

The CBS News Weekend Roundup was based on the early CBS Radio format of reporters discussing the issues from different points of the world or nation. That 1938 format was not only the basis for the CBS World News Roundup, which airs mornings and evenings on the radio network, but the Sunday morning talk shows that are a staple of American TV.

The Weekend Roundup was also a direct successor to the CBS Radio Network show Capital Ideas, focusing on government and domestic news, which aired during the 1990s from Washington, D.C., and featured correspondents Rob Armstrong and John Hartge as well as Arenstein.

CBS News Radio cancelled the Weekend Roundup, along with the World News Roundup Late Edition, in late 2025, ahead of the eventual shutdown of the CBS News Radio service in May 2026.
