= KLGR-FM =

Radio station in Redwood Falls, Minnesota

- Redwood Falls, Minnesota; United States
- Frequency: 97.7 MHz
- Branding: 97.7 Jack FM

Programming
- Language: English
- Format: Adult hits
- Affiliations: Jack FM network

Ownership
- Owner: Connoisseur Media; (Alpha 3E Licensee LLC)
- Sister stations: KLGR

History
- First air date: June 3, 1974; 51 years ago

Technical information
- Licensing authority: FCC
- Facility ID: 9654
- Class: A
- ERP: 3,000 watts
- HAAT: 91 meters (299 ft)
- Transmitter coordinates: 44°32′32.8″N 95°7′57.9″W

Links
- Public license information: Public file; LMS
- Webcast: Listen live; Listen live (via Audacy)
- Website: www.myklgr.com

KLGR-FM (97.7 MHz) is a commercial radio station licensed to Redwood Falls, Minnesota, and known as "97.7 Jack FM". The station broadcasts an adult hits radio format and is owned by Connoisseur Media, through licensee Alpha 3E Licensee LLC.

KLGR-FM is an affiliate of the Jack FM national radio network. It does not use DJs. Instead, the voice of "Jack" makes station announcements and adds quips between songs.

== History ==
In November 2017, KLGR-FM rebranded as "97.7 Jack FM".
