= KPSI-FM =

Radio station in Palm Springs, California

Coordinates: 33.946°N 116.410°W

- Palm Springs, California; United States
- Broadcast area: Coachella Valley
- Frequency: 100.5 MHz
- Branding: Mix 100.5

Programming
- Format: Hot adult contemporary
- Affiliations: Premiere Networks

Ownership
- Owner: Connoisseur Media; (Alpha Media Licensee LLC)
- Sister stations: KCLB-FM; KCLZ; KDES-FM; KDGL; KKUU; KNWZ

History
- First air date: June 13, 1980
- Former frequencies: 100.9 MHz (1980–1991)
- Call sign meaning: Palm Springs

Technical information
- Licensing authority: FCC
- Facility ID: 35497
- Class: B1
- ERP: 25,000 watts
- HAAT: 37 meters (121 ft)

Links
- Public license information: Public file; LMS
- Webcast: Listen live; Listen live (via iHeartRadio)
- Website: mix1005.fm

KPSI-FM (100.5 FM, "Mix 100.5") is a commercial radio station licensed to Palm Springs, California, United States, and serving the Coachella Valley. Owned by Connoisseur Media, it airs a hot adult contemporary format with studios on Gene Autry Trail in Palm Springs and transmitter sited off Bennett Road in Desert Hot Springs.

== History ==
KPSI-FM signed on the air on June 13, 1960, as the FM counterpart to KPSI (1450 AM). They were owned by the KPSI Radio Corporation. KPSI-FM originally broadcast on 100.9 FM, powered only at 3,000 watts. At the time, the station aired a top 40/contemporary hit radio format branded as "KPSI-101" and later "Power 101".

Previous logo

In November 1991, the frequency was changed to 100.5, which also allowed KPSI-FM to boost its power to 25,000 watts. On March 19, 2002, KPSI-FM dropped the top 40 sound, changing to its current hot adult contemporary music format and "Mix 100.5" branding.
