= KCLB-FM =

Radio station in Coachella, California

Coordinates: 33.801667°N 116.224444°W

- Coachella, California; United States
- Broadcast area: Palm Springs
- Frequency: 93.7 MHz
- Branding: 93.7 KCLB

Programming
- Format: Mainstream rock

Ownership
- Owner: Connoisseur Media; (Alpha Media Licensee LLC)
- Sister stations: KCLZ; KDES-FM; KDGL; KKUU; KNWZ; KPSI-FM

History
- First air date: September 1, 1960 (as KCHV-FM)
- Former call signs: KCHV-FM (1960–1972); KVIM (1972–1983); KCHV-FM (1983-1988); KRCK (2/1988–6/1988); KCHV (1988–1991)

Technical information
- Licensing authority: FCC
- Facility ID: 12131
- Class: B
- ERP: 26,500 watts
- HAAT: 197 meters (646 ft)
- Repeater: 95.5 KCLZ (Twentynine Palms Base)

Links
- Public license information: Public file; LMS
- Webcast: Listen live
- Website: www.937kclb.com

KCLB-FM (93.7 MHz) is a commercial radio station in Coachella, California, broadcasting to the Palm Springs radio market. It airs a mainstream rock radio format. KCLB is owned by Connoisseur Media, through licensee Alpha Media Licensee LLC. Programming is simulcast on sister station 95.5 KCLZ in Twentynine Palms Base, about 30 miles to the north of Coachella.

KCLB's studio and offices are on North Gene Autry Trail in Palm Springs. The transmitter is located in Indio Hills, California. Its signal reaches as far west as San Bernardino and far east as Desert Center and as far south as the Imperial Valley.

== History ==
=== Early years ===
On September 1, 1960, the station signed on the air as KCHV-FM. It was owned by the Coachella Valley Broadcasting Company and it simulcast co-owned KCHV (970 AM). The two stations mixed middle of the road music, news and talk. By the late 1960s, KCHV-FM was separately programmed with an automated country music format.

In 1972, in response to the growing Mexican-American community in the Coachella Valley, the station switched to a Regional Mexican music format, with the new call sign KVIM.

Starting in 1974, both KCHV and KVIM changed their programming late nights to play progressive rock from 10pm to 6am. Scott Roberts, later with KKRZ Z-100 in Portland, Oregon, worked the late night shift at KCHV/KVIM and was the first disc jockey to play a free form rock format in the Coachella Valley. Roberts left KCHV/KVIM in 1976.

In 1983, the AM and FM stations switched formats. AM 970 became Spanish-language KVIM, playing Regional Mexican music. FM 93.7 returned to KCHV-FM, airing middle of the road music, talk and news by day, and album rock at night.

=== Album rock ===
The station began calling itself The Rock and airing a more structured album-oriented rock (AOR) format in 1985, based on playing the biggest selling rock artists. Program director Cyrene Jagger was able to get KCHV-FM recognized as a reporting station for Radio & Records and FMQB radio industry magazines. She developed a complete rock music library and began coordinating live concerts and invited rock artists visiting the Coachella Valley to come on the air. Jagger remained as program director until 1989.

For six months in 1988, KCHV-FM had a brief call sign change to KRCK (standing for the word "Rock"). But the Federal Communications Commission (FCC) failed to recognize those call letters were already claimed by another radio station, so 93.7 returned to KCHV-FM.

KCHV-FM achieved some of its biggest success under Operations Manager Bill Todd from 1989 to 1991. Todd, who had worked at such stations as WIBG, Philadelphia; WRKO, Boston; KHJ, and KMET, Los Angeles; built up KCHV-FM into a major album rock station in Southern California. Russell J. and Cyrene Jagger hosted mornings, Jim King in middays, John O. in afternoons with nights handled by Jimi "The Hitman" Hurley, Shawn The Trogg and Mitch Michaels (Jim Black). Other notable contributors of the time were Rhonda Todd (Music Director), Bobby Blue, Don James, Scott Canon, DJ Martin, Satch Miata, Angela Nixs, Michael Parks, Brian Ross, Shana, Guy Smith, Igor Smith, Jackson T, Jill West, Christy Wild, and Kate Willis.

=== Switch to KCLB-FM ===
In 1991, Bill Todd departed and the station switched its call letters to KCLB-FM. In the early though mid- and late-1990s, KCLB called itself "The Valley's Best Rock". Its program director was J.J. Jeffries; he was replaced by music director Ron Stryker, who guided the station the top of the Coachella Valley ratings. Disc jockeys during this time included Jeffries and Stryker, Katie Brock, John O, Tony Montana, Jon Pergl, Bill Royal, Christian Stiehler, Stevie Bowe, Kevin Gerard, Jeff Duran, Steve Inman, Steve Santogrossi ("The Night Manager") and Liz West.

Former logo

In 1998, KCLB-FM and AM 970 were bought by Morris Communications for $7 million. The AM station switched to a Spanish contemporary format, taking the call letters KCLB. Several years later, it moved to an English-language news/talk format as KNWZ.

Morris Communications sold its radio stations to Alpha Media in 2015 for over $38 million. Alpha Media merged with Connoisseur Media on September 4, 2025.
