= KWIQ-FM =

Radio station in Moses Lake, Washington

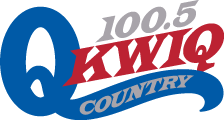
- Moses Lake, Washington; United States
- Broadcast area: Moses Lake, Washington
- Frequency: 100.5 MHz
- Branding: Q Country

Programming
- Format: Country music

Ownership
- Owner: Connoisseur Media; (Alpha Media Licensee LLC)
- Sister stations: KWIQ

History
- First air date: 1968 (at 100.3)
- Former call signs: KWIQ-FM (1968–1978); KFMT (1978–1980)
- Former frequencies: 100.3 MHz (1968–2013)

Technical information
- Licensing authority: FCC
- Facility ID: 35887
- Class: C2
- ERP: 50,000 watts
- HAAT: 50 meters (160 ft)
- Transmitter coordinates: 47°6′8.5″N 119°14′28.1″W

Links
- Public license information: Public file; LMS
- Webcast: Listen live
- Website: www.kwiq.com

KWIQ-FM (100.5 FM) is a radio station broadcasting a country music format. Licensed to Moses Lake, Washington, United States, the station serves the Moses Lake area. The station is owned by Connoisseur Media.

== History ==
KWIQ-FM was first licensed on August 2, 1968. On July 17, 1978, the call sign was changed to KFMT; it went back to KWIQ-FM on March 31, 1980. On August 20, 2013, KWIQ-FM moved from 100.3 MHz to 100.5 MHz and dropped power from 100,000 watts to 50,000 watts, although the license for these changes was not issued by the Federal Communications Commission until September 10, 2013.
