= KKUU =

Radio station in Indio, California

Coordinates: 33.871°N 116.228°W

- Indio, California; United States
- Broadcast area: Palm Springs
- Frequency: 92.7 MHz (HD Radio)
- Branding: U-92.7

Programming
- Format: Rhythmic top 40 (CHR)
- Subchannels: HD2: KNWZ simulcast; HD3: Sports "ESPN Radio 103.9"
- Affiliations: Compass Media Networks; Premiere Networks

Ownership
- Owner: Connoisseur Media; (Alpha Media Licensee LLC)
- Sister stations: KCLB-FM; KCLZ; KDES-FM; KDGL; KNWZ; KPSI-FM

History
- First air date: 1984 (as KCMJ-FM)
- Former call signs: KCMJ-FM (1984–1998)
- Call sign meaning: U 92.7

Technical information
- Licensing authority: FCC
- Facility ID: 11658
- Class: A
- ERP: 4,200 watts
- HAAT: 120 meters (390 ft)
- Translator: HD3: 103.9 K280CV (Cathedral City)

Links
- Public license information: Public file; LMS
- Webcast: Listen live; HD3: Listen live
- Website: www.927kkuu.com; HD3: www.1039espn.com

KKUU (92.7 FM) is a commercial radio station in Indio, California, broadcasting to the Palm Springs area. Owned by Connoisseur Media, KKUU airs a rhythmic top 40 (CHR) music format branded as "U 92.7".

== History ==
KKUU has aired five different programming formats since signing on in 1984. The station first signed on airing a country format as KCMJ-FM. Later, KCMJ-FM flipped to a hot AC format as "KC92.7 FM". It then shifted to soft AC as "Classy 92", which would later shift to 1980s music under the affiliation of CBS Radio. For a brief time in February 1994, the station was branded as "Sunny 92.7". KCMJ-FM aired a classic hits format branded as "Arrow 92.7" prior to flipping to the rhythmic format as KKUU in May 1998. KKUU has played hits outside the rhythmic contemporary structure, such as Not Over You by Gavin DeGraw, but is a Mediabase rhythmic contemporary reporter while it also reports to the Nielsen BDS rhythmic contemporary indicator panel.

Former personalities include Jimmy Kimmel, Kevin Koske, and Mike Bell. It is a radio affiliate for the Los Angeles Rams.

== KKUU HD2 ==
Broadcast on translator 103.9 K2308V in 2012 It signed on with a hot AC format branded as Crush 103.9 but in 2015 the station shifted to soft AC and identified itself as 103.9 FM and then rebranded as Easy 103.9. Then it would later rebrand as 103.9 The Breeze The Perfect Blend. In November 2015 the station flipped to a sports format with programing being provided by ESPN Radio

== Competition ==
KKUU gets little competition in the Palm Springs area (Coachella Valley). There are 3 stations that give competition to KKUU: KPSI-FM Mix 100.5 (which is a sister station), KPST-FM Fuego FM 103.5, and KJJZ Hot 95.9. KKUU also competed against KRCK-FM until that station's flip in 2021.
