= Doug James (American football) =

American football player (born 1962)

Doug James (born July 17, 1962, in Louisville, Kentucky) is a former American football player for the University of Michigan Wolverines (1980–1984) under coach Bo Schembechler. In 1985, he began his career in broadcast media where he has worked in radio sales and management as well as working on-air as a football color commentator on both radio and television.

== Career ==
=== Football ===
James was an all state football player at DeSales High School in Louisville in 1979. After graduating in 1980, James joined former high school teammate Bubba Paris at Michigan, where Paris went on to earn All American honors before winning three Super Bowls with the San Francisco 49ers. At Michigan James wore jersey number 73, and played multiple positions on both offense and defense at Michigan. He was a starter at three different positions including middle guard on defense, offensive guard and offensive tackle. He was honorable mention All Big Ten at offensive tackle in 1983 and second team All Big Ten in at offensive guard in 1984. In 1984, he was elected Michigan's co-captain and was named most valuable lineman, and hustler of the year. During his career James earned 4 varsity letters while Michigan won two Big Ten Championships and played in five bowl games, including the Rose Bowl, in 1981 and 1983, the Sugar Bowl, Bluebonnet Bowl and Holiday Bowl.

Considered an over achiever, Bo Schembechler told James he had "the worst body in the history of Michigan Football". James once asked Schembechler if he had such a terrible body, why was he able to play so much, to which Schembechler responded, "because I'm a heck of a coach." On November 17, 2006, Bo Schembechler died. It was on the eve of the showdown between Michigan and Ohio State which pitted the top ranked Buckeyes against the second ranked Wolverines. James recounted some of his favorite memories of his old coach in an ESPN.com article by Pat Forde, ending with a poignant quote. "It's disappointing he's not going to be here for the game," James said. "But I guess he's going to have a better seat than all the rest of us."

=== Broadcasting career ===
After graduating from Michigan in December 1984 he worked briefly as a graduate assistant for Coach Schembechler. He started his radio career in 1985 in Flint, Michigan as a color commentator for Michigan Football on WTRX. In 1986, he began his career in radio sales at the same station. James returned to his hometown in 1988 and in 1990 started working for Clear Channel radio as a sales person for WAMZ radio. He joined the University of Louisville football radio broadcast team on sister station WHAS-AM radio in 1990 when the Cardinals finished with a record of 10-1-1 under coach Howard Schnellenberger and won the Fiesta Bowl over Alabama.

James advanced his career in sales and management at Clear Channel, ultimately earning the title of Vice President and General manager for three of that company's stations, WQMF, WTFX and WQSH. He continued to broadcast Louisville football, and co-hosted a popular weekly football talk show on WHAS radio with Tony Cruise. During the 2000 football season, James left Clear Channel to work for Blue Chip Broadcasting in sales management. From 2000 to 2004 James worked as the color commentator for University of Louisville football on WDRB Fox 41 TV with Don Russell doing play by play. From 2005 to 2013 James continued his work as a freelance commentator on WHAS 11 television, an ABC affiliate.

James served as the Director of Sales for Radio One and the Vice President of Sales for Main Line Broadcasting in Louisville, which owns five radio stations including WDJX, WGZB, WMJM, WESI and WXMA. He also served as the Director of Sales at Emmis Communications, for WQHT Hot 97, WBLS and WLIB in New York, New York. In August 2015 James returned to Radio One as the Vice President/General Manager for WOSF, WPZS and WQNC located in Charlotte, North Carolina. He currently serves as the advertising director for Louisville Business First.

== Personal ==
James has been very active in the Louisville community serving on the Board of Trustees for Jewish Hospital and St Mary's Healthcare, The DeSales High School Foundation, and The Holy Rosary Foundation. He also served on the board of trustees for the Kentucky Broadcasters Association and The Louisville Radio Broadcasters Association. He is a member of The Kentucky Colonels.

== Awards ==
He has received a number of awards including: DeSales High School Hall of Honors 1991, AWRT Lifetime Service Award 2001, Mayor of Louisville Distinguished Citizen 2008, and Catholic Education Foundation Distinguished Alumni 2008.
