= Main Line Broadcasting =

American media company

Main Line Broadcasting was an American media company, based in Philadelphia, Pennsylvania. At its peak, Main Line Broadcasting owned 19 radio stations in four markets in the United States. The company was founded by Dan Savadove and was most recently run by CEO Marc Guralnick. Main Line was backed by the Arlington Capital Group, a private equity company.

Main Line's original operating strategy was to purchase and operate radio stations in mid-size Arbitron markets, generally those ranked between 50 and 150 in Arbitron's market size list.

== History ==
Main Line's first acquisition was Dame Broadcasting's 5-station group in Hagerstown, Maryland in August 2005. In December 2005, Main Line purchased four stations from MainQuad Broadcasting in the Richmond, Virginia market.

In May 2007, Main Line doubled in size with the purchase of ten stations from Radio One in the Louisville, Kentucky and Dayton, Ohio markets. In October 2008, it downsized its Louisville, Kentucky cluster as part of company-wide budget cutting. In doing so, the entire WLRS airstaff was released. WLRS retained its rock format.

On April 17, 2014, L&L Broadcasting announced that it has agreed to purchase all of Main Line's stations as part of a merger with Alpha Broadcasting. The combined entity will be known as Alpha Media. The sale closed on July 1, 2014.

== Former Stations ==
All of these stations are owned by Alpha Media as of July 1, 2014.

DMA	Market	Station	Frequency	Branding	Format
53	Louisville, KY	WGZB-FM	96.5	B96.5	Urban
53	Louisville, KY	WDJX-FM	99.7	99.7 DJX	Contemporary Hit Radio
53	Louisville, KY	WMJM-FM	101.3	Magic 101.3	Urban AC
53	Louisville, KY	WXMA-FM	102.3	102.3 The Max	Hot AC
53	Louisville, KY	WGHL	105.1	Greatest Hits Louisville	Classic Hits
56	Richmond-Petersburg, VA	WLFV	93.1	93.1 The Wolf	Southern Country
56	Richmond-Petersburg, VA	WWLB	98.9	98.9 Liberty	Variety Hits
56	Richmond-Petersburg, VA	WARV-FM	100.3	Big Oldies 107.3	Oldies
56	Richmond-Petersburg, VA	WBBT-FM	107.3	Big Oldies 107.3	Oldies
60	Dayton, OH	WROU-FM	92.1	92.1 WROU	Urban AC
60	Dayton, OH	WGTZ-FM	92.9	Fly 92.9	Variety Hits
60	Dayton, OH	WCLI-FM	101.5	Click 101.5	Modern Hit Music
60	Dayton, OH	WDHT-FM	102.9	Hot 102.9	Rhythmic Contemporary
60	Dayton, OH	WING-AM	1410	ESPN 1410	Sports
166	Hagerstown, MD- Chambersburg, PA	WQCM-FM	94.3	94.3 WQCM	Rock
166	Hagerstown, MD- Chambersburg, PA	WIKZ-FM	95.1	Mix 95.1	Adult Contemporary
166	Hagerstown, MD- Chambersburg, PA	WDLD-FM	96.7	Wild 96.7	Rhythmic Contemporary Hit Radio
166	Hagerstown, MD- Chambersburg, PA	WCHA-AM	800	True Oldies 96.3	Oldies
166	Hagerstown, MD- Chambersburg, PA	WHAG-AM	1410	True Oldies 96.3	Oldies
166	Hagerstown, MD- Chambersburg, PA	W242BY	96.3	True Oldies 96.3	Oldies
