= WKRD =

WKRD may refer to:

- WKRD (AM), a radio station (790 AM) licensed to serve Louisville, Kentucky, United States
- WVKY, a radio station (101.7 FM) licensed to serve Shelbyville, Kentucky, which held the call sign WKRD-FM from 2007 to 2012
- WYAI, a radio station (93.7 FM) licensed to serve Scotia, New York, United States, licensed as WKRD from 2002 to 2004
