= WKJK =

- Louisville, Kentucky; United States
- Broadcast area: Louisville metropolitan area
- Frequency: 1080 kHz
- Branding: Talkradio 1080

Programming
- Language: English
- Format: Talk radio
- Affiliations: Fox News Radio; Compass Media Networks; Genesis Communications Network; Premiere Networks

Ownership
- Owner: iHeartMedia, Inc.; (iHM Licenses, LLC)
- Sister stations: WAMZ; WHAS; WKRD; WNRW; WQMF; WSDF; WTFX-FM

History
- First air date: November 1948
- Former call signs: WKLO (1948–1979); WKJJ (1979–1980); WCII (1980–1993); WWSN (1993); WDJX (1993–1994); WRES (1994–1995); WHKW (1995–1996)

Technical information
- Licensing authority: FCC
- Facility ID: 55497
- Class: B
- Power: 10,000 watts (day); 1,000 watts (night)
- Transmitter coordinates: 38°18′29″N 85°49′45″W

Links
- Public license information: Public file; LMS
- Webcast: Listen live (via iHeartRadio)
- Website: talkradio1080.iheart.com

WKJK (1080 AM) is a commercial radio station broadcasting a talk radio format in Louisville, Kentucky. It is owned by iHeartMedia and serves North-Central Kentucky and South-Central Indiana. It features programming from iHeart subsidiary Premiere Networks as well as Compass Media Networks. The station's studios are in the Louisville neighborhood of Watterson Park.

By day, WKJK is powered at 10,000 watts. Because 1080 AM is a clear-channel frequency, WKJK must reduce power at night to 1,000 watts to protect the Class A stations on 1080 kHz, KRLD in Dallas and WTIC in Hartford, Connecticut. It uses a directional antenna off East Daisy Lane in New Albany, Indiana.

== History ==
=== Top 40 ===
The station signed on the air in November 1948. Its original call sign was WKLO. The studios were in the Henry Clay Hotel.

WKLO was one of Louisville's favorite Top 40 stations in the 1960s and 70s. It was owned by Dayton-based Great Trails Broadcasting, which also owned several other Top 40 outlets, all of them in Ohio including WING, WIZE, WCOL, WCOL-FM and WGTZ. WKLO provided competition to Louisville's main Top 40 station, WAKY (790 AM, now WKRD). In 1979, WKLO began sharing its Top 40 format with sister station WKJJ (99.7 FM, now WDJX). Because co-owned AM and FM stations could not fully simulcast the same programming at the same time, WKLO became a "shadowcast" delayed broadcast of WKJJ-FM.

=== Country, oldies, Christian and all news ===
In 1980, it became WCII. It tried several formats, including country music, oldies and Christian music. It returned to a simulcast of its FM sister and its Top 40 format in September 1988 (though it would briefly break away for an all-news format).

On June 24, 1991, the station flipped to Christian talk and teaching after it was leased out to different operators. Six months later, on January 13, 1992, it again flipped back to a simulcast of its FM sister. In April 1992, a fire at the base of one of the towers briefly took the station off the air.

The station was assigned the call letters WWSN on May 15, 1993. It was part of a warehousing move to put the call letters on 107.7 FM after it signed on later in the year. By August, the AM occasionally split from the simulcast to air some alternative rock programming. Several months later, on October 15, 1993, the station changed its call sign to WDJX. In September 1994, it ended the simulcast and returned to all-news as "The News Resource", WRES. During this time, the station aired AP Radio News and NBC Talknet programs.

=== Classic country, standards and talk ===
In July 1995, WRES flipped to classic country as "The Hawk", WHKW. The format was moved from 98.9 FM. It later became "KJ 1080", WKJK. On June 7, 1997, the station flipped to adult standards for a couple of years.

In 1999, WKJK flipped to a talk radio format. With sister station WHAS airing mostly local talk shows, WKJK became the Louisville home for iHeart's nationally syndicated shows, including Sean Hannity and Glenn Beck.

== Programming ==
iHeartMedia owns two talk stations in Louisville. WHAS airs mostly local talk shows while WKJK's lineup is largely nationally syndicated programs. The schedule includes This Morning, America's First News with Gordon Deal, The Glenn Beck Radio Program, The Ramsey Show with Dave Ramsey, The Sean Hannity Show (both of which are broadcast on a delay), The Joe Pags Show, The Jesse Kelly Show, Our American Stories with Lee Habeeb and Dr. Asa Andrew on Call.

Weekends feature shows on money, gardening, travel and computers, including syndicated programs: The Kim Komando Show, In the Garden with Ron Wilson, Armstrong & Getty, Rudy Maxa World Travel and At Home with Gary Sullivan. As a sister station of WHAS, WKJK is a secondary home for University of Kentucky sports, including women's basketball and baseball games, and for Racing Louisville FC women's soccer games. Most hours begin with an update from Fox News Radio.
