= WHAG =

WHAG may refer to:

- WHAG (AM), a radio station (1410 AM) licensed to Halfway, Maryland, United States
- WDLD, a radio station (96.7 FM) licensed to Halfway, Maryland, United States, which used the call sign WHAG-FM from 1965 to 1974
- WDVM-TV, a television station (channel 25) licensed to Hagerstown, Maryland, United States, which used the call sign WHAG-TV from 1970 to 2017
