= WQSH =

WQSH may refer to:

- WQSH (FM), a radio station (103.5 FM) licensed to serve Cobleskill, New York, United States
- WQBK-FM, a radio station (105.7 FM) licensed to serve Malta, New York, which held the call sign WQSH from 2011 to 2019
- WNRW, a radio station (98.9 FM) licensed to serve Prospect, Kentucky, United States, which held the call sign WQSH from 1999 to 2000
- WTFX-FM, a radio station (93.1 FM) licensed to serve Clarksville, Indiana, United States, which held the call sign WQSH from 1998 to 1999
