= WRKA =

Radio station in Louisville, Kentucky

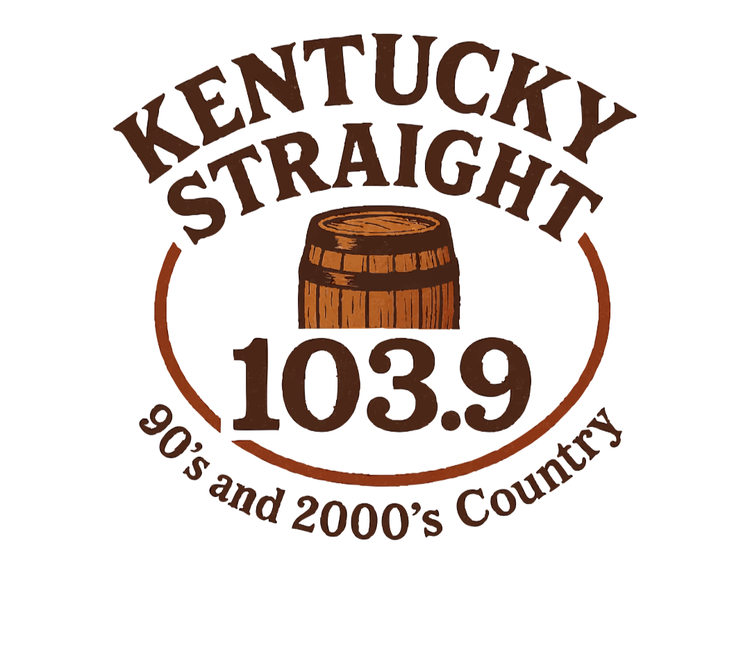
- Louisville, Kentucky; United States
- Broadcast area: Louisville metropolitan area
- Frequency: 103.9 MHz
- Branding: Kentucky Straight 103.9

Programming
- Format: Classic country
- Affiliations: Compass Media Networks

Ownership
- Owner: SummitMedia; (SM-WRKA, LLC)
- Sister stations: WQNU; WSFR; WVEZ

History
- First air date: November 1974 (as WFIA-FM)
- Former call signs: WFIA-FM (1974–79); WXLN (1979–90); WZKS (1990–93); >WHKW (1993–94); WQLL (1994–96); WSJW (1996–98); WMHX (1998–2000); WPTK (2000); WPTI (2000–08)

Technical information
- Licensing authority: FCC
- Facility ID: 48290
- Class: A
- ERP: 1,350 watts
- HAAT: 149 meters (489 ft)

Links
- Public license information: Public file; LMS

WRKA (103.9 FM, "Kentucky Straight 103.9") is a commercial radio station in Louisville, Kentucky, owned by SummitMedia, It airs a classic country format. WRKA previously carried two nationally syndicated programs on weekdays: The Rickey Smiley Morning Show in AM drive time and the D.L. Hughley Show in afternoons.

The studios are in the SummitMedia building in Downtown Louisville. The transmitter is atop the National City Tower. WKRA is a Class A station powered at 1,350 watts.

== History ==
=== Christian radio ===
The station signed on the air in November 1974 as WFIA-FM, the sister station to WFIA (900 AM). The stations aired a Christian radio format and were owned by AM 900, Inc. The call sign was later changed to WXLN and played contemporary Christian music.

=== Top 40 hits ===
In the summer of 1990, the Christian format ended. The station flipped to Top 40-CHR as WZKS "Kiss 104". Debuting on July 5, 1990, WZKS intended to challenge established Top 40 station WDJX. This ended when WDJX's owners entered into a local marketing agreement (LMA) to operate the station on January 27, 1992. The two stations simulcast the same top 40 format for nearly a month and a half. After the simulcast broke at 6 a.m. on March 20, WZKS began stunting by playing songs recorded by Garth Brooks, then switched to country music on March 23.

During this period, WZKS became the first FM station in the market intended to challenge longtime country leader WAMZ. Initially, the station was known as "Hot Country 103.9". Unlike WAMZ, WZKS had no local DJs, instead relying on Westwood One's "Hot Country" format. On March 30, 1993, the station was revamped as "103.9 The Hawk". It added local air personalities and changed its call sign to WHKW.

=== Oldies ===
The format, call letters, and "The Hawk" branding were transferred to WKJK (107.7 FM) on May 24, 1994. After that programming move, WHKW adopted an oldies format branded as "Cool 103.9", with replacement WQLL call letters on June 6. The playlist was later changed to all 1970s music, but the "Cool" branding was retained.

In May 1996, WQLL's format and "Cool" branding would move to 107.7 FM. After simulcasting for a few days, 103.9 FM changed its format to smooth jazz on June 3, 1996, and changed its call letters to WSJW. On August 7, 1998, the station changed again to adult contemporary as WMHX "Mix 103.9", reviving a format dropped by the former WLRS a year earlier.

After the station was purchased by Cox Radio in 1999, WHMX switched to an all-1980s hits format branded as "103.9 The Point" in November 2000. The call letters were switched to WPTK on November 24, then a month later, on December 20, to WPTI. WPTI dropped the 1980s hits format for another attempt at country, branded "New Country 103.9", on October 21, 2004. WPTI's call letters were changed to WRKA on July 18, 2008, and the format was changed to classic country as "Country Legends 103.9" that July 23. The previous country format was moved to the former WRKA, renamed WQNU.

=== Country music ===
Cox Radio sold WRKA, along with 22 other stations, to SummitMedia for $66.25 million on July 20, 2012. The sale was consummated on May 3, 2013. SummitMedia had new plans for the station.

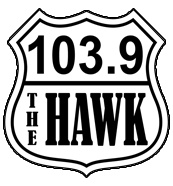
Logo as "103.9 The Hawk" logo, 2014–2018

On May 23, 2014, WRKA began stunting by only playing music by Garth Brooks as "103.9 Garth-FM". The station later claimed it was not able to use Brooks' name due to what was described as "legal issues". It rebranded as "XXXXX-FM" (with the "XXXXX" being pronounced on-air as a long beep) and promising a new format to debut the following Monday, June 2, at 7 a.m.. At that time, WRKA relaunched with a 1990s-heavy country format, once again branded as "103.9 The Hawk". The first song on "The Hawk" was Gone Country by Alan Jackson.

=== Rhythmic and urban AC ===
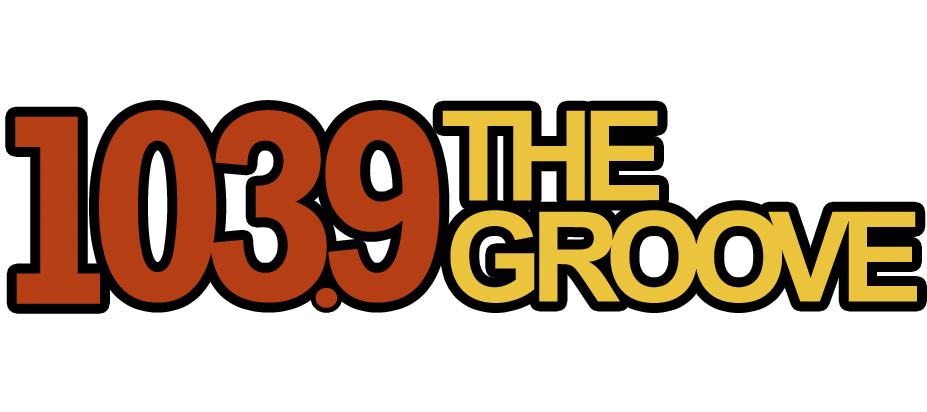
Logo as "103.9 The Groove" logo, 2018–2025

On December 31, 2018, WRKA dropped the classic country format and began stunting as "103.9 The Party" using the slogan, "Where it's New Year's Eve every day." On January 14, 2019, at 9 a.m., WRKA flipped to rhythmic adult contemporary, branded as "103.9 The Groove".

In January 2020, WRKA shifted to urban adult contemporary, still under the "Groove" branding. It added The Rickey Smiley Morning Show for wake-ups.

=== Classic country ===
On July 14, 2025, WRKA changed their format from urban adult contemporary to classic country, branded as "Kentucky Straight 103.9".
