= WRKA (disambiguation) =

WRKA may refer to:

- WRKA, a radio station (103.9 FM) licensed to Louisville, Kentucky, United States
- WRKA, the ICAO code for Haliwen Airport in Atambua, Indonesia
- WQNU, a radio station (103.1 FM) licensed to Lyndon, Kentucky, United States, known as WRKA from January 1980 to July 2008
