= WSDF =

Variety hits radio station in Louisville, Kentucky

- Louisville, Kentucky; United States
- Broadcast area: Louisville Metro Area / Kentuckiana
- Frequency: 100.5 MHz (HD Radio)
- Branding: 100.5 FM

Programming
- Format: Adult hits
- Subchannels: HD2: K-Love; HD3: Air1
- Affiliations: Premiere Networks

Ownership
- Owner: iHeartMedia; (iHM Licenses, LLC)
- Sister stations: WTFX-FM, WQMF, WAMZ, WNRW, WKRD, WHAS, WKJK

History
- First air date: 1993
- Former call signs: WTFX (1991–2002); WTFX-FM (2002–2005); WLUE (2005–2009); WLGX (2009–2020)
- Call sign meaning: SDF is the ICAO code for Louisville Muhammad Ali International Airport

Technical information
- Licensing authority: FCC
- Facility ID: 53593
- Class: C2
- ERP: 37,000 watts
- HAAT: 169 meters (554 ft)
- Transmitter coordinates: 38°11′32.00″N 85°31′17.00″W
- Translators: HD2: 95.1 W236AN (Louisville); HD3: 97.9 W250BD (Louisville)

Links
- Public license information: Public file; LMS
- Webcast: Listen Live
- Website: 1005louisville.iheart.com

WSDF (100.5 FM) is a radio station broadcasting an adult hits format under the branding "100.5 FM". Licensed to Louisville, Kentucky, United States, the station serves the Louisville area. The station is owned by iHeartMedia and features programming from iHeart subsidiary Premiere Networks. The station is also broadcast on HD radio. The station's studios are located in the Louisville enclave of Watterson Park and the transmitter site is in east Louisville, southwest of the I-64/I-265 interchange.

== History ==
The station was assigned call letters WTFX on June 28, 1991. On April 19, 2002, the station changed its call sign to WTFX-FM, on August 19, 2005, to WLUE, and an application was filed as of September 3, 2009, to change the call sign to WLGX. On February 4, 2020, the call sign was changed to WSDF.

This station initially signed on with a classic rock format on June 11, 1993, which shifted more towards mainstream rock and then active rock by 2002, as 100.5 The Fox. On August 10, 2005, at noon, "The Fox" moved to 93.1, while 100.5 began stunting with a loop of the songs "Louie Louie" by The Kingsmen and "Brother Louie" by Stories. At 2 p.m., 100.5 flipped to variety hits as 100.5 Louie FM. The first song on Louie was "Piano Man" by Billy Joel.

On September 3, 2009, at 5 p.m., in response to slipping market share, the station shifted towards a 1990s pop/rock-centered offering called "100.5 Gen-X Radio". According to a press release which was issued hours before the format change, the station promised to feature music from "grunge, hip-hop, hair bands and boy bands".

Beginning in 2011, WLGX would temporarily drop their '90s Hits format beginning in November each year for a Christmas music format, branded as "Gen X-Mas", during the tenure of the 90s hits format. During these times, they maintained a separate stream of the regular "Gen X" format under the same name on iHeartRadio.

In April 2014, the station branding was modified and changed to "My 100.5 Gen-X Radio". At the same time, the 1980s and '90s music was greatly reduced, and the playlist was modified to include a Hot Adult Contemporary mix of music generally focused towards the 1990s through today. On July 1, 2014, at midnight, WLGX was officially rebranded as 100.5 MYfm.

On May 25, 2016, WLGX rebranded as "100.5 Kiss FM".

On November 27, 2019, WLGX dropped its hot adult contemporary format and began stunting with Christmas music; unlike other years the station had played Christmas music, the station had gone jockless with the flip, and had erased all references to "Kiss FM", rebranding as "Christmas 100.5". At midnight on December 30, the stunting shifted to a broad-spanning variety hits format branded as simply "100.5 FM", teasing that a new format was "under construction", and was set to be revealed in the near future.

On January 14, 2020, at 5 p.m., the variety hits format was confirmed as the permanent format, albeit with a slightly more narrowed approach consisting of '80s and '90s hits, not unlike the previous "Gen-X" format, branded as "100.5 FM - Your Life, on Shuffle". The first song under the new iteration of the format was "Bust a Move" by Young MC.

== Previous logos ==
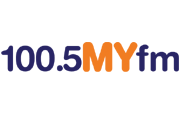
