= B96 =

B96 may refer to:

- Bundesstraße 96, a German road
- Sicilian Defence, Najdorf Variation, according to the list of chess openings
- B96, a postcode district in the B postcode area
- B96, a defunct Minnesota radio station, now part of KMWA
- WBBM-FM, B96 Chicago

B-96 may refer to:

- WGZB-FM, B-96 Louisville
- B-96 (Michigan county highway)
