= KYW =

KYW may refer to:

- KYW (AM), a radio station (1060 AM) licensed to Philadelphia, Pennsylvania, United States, which carried the KYW callsign from 1921 to 1956; and has again since 1965
  - WPHI-FM, a radio station that carries the FM simulcast of KYW
- KYW-TV, a television station (channel 30, virtual 3) licensed to Philadelphia, Pennsylvania, United States, which has carried the KYW-TV callsign since 1965
- WTAM, a radio station (1100 AM) licensed to Cleveland, Ohio, United States, which carried the KYW callsign from 1956 to 1965
- WMJI, a radio station (105.7 FM) licensed to Cleveland, Ohio, United States, which carried the KYW-FM callsign from 1956 to 1965
- WKYC, a television station (channel 3) licensed to Cleveland, Ohio, United States, which carried the KYW-TV callsign from 1956 to 1965
- WKYW (AM), a radio station (1490 AM) licensed to Frankfort, Kentucky, United States, which has carried the WKYW callsign since December 2007
