= WQMF =

- Jeffersonville, Indiana; United States
- Broadcast area: Louisville, Kentucky
- Frequency: 95.7 MHz (HD Radio)
- Branding: 95.7 QMF

Programming
- Format: Mainstream rock
- Subchannels: HD2: Active rock "The Fox"
- Affiliations: Westwood One

Ownership
- Owner: iHeartMedia; (iHM Licenses, LLC)
- Sister stations: WTFX-FM, WAMZ, WNRW, WSDF, WKRD, WHAS, WKJK

History
- First air date: April 1974; 52 years ago
- Former call signs: WQHI (1974–1981)

Technical information
- Licensing authority: FCC
- Facility ID: 50763
- Class: B
- ERP: 28,500 watts
- HAAT: 196 meters (643 feet)
- Transmitter coordinates: 38°08′16.00″N 85°56′05.00″W

Links
- Public license information: Public file; LMS
- Webcast: Listen Live; Listen Live (HD2)
- Website: wqmf.iheart.com foxrocks.iheart.com (HD2)

WQMF (95.7 FM) is a mainstream rock radio station in Louisville, Kentucky. The station is licensed by the Federal Communications Commission (FCC) to the nearby city of Jeffersonville, Indiana, and broadcasts with an effective radiated power (ERP) of 28.5 kW. The station's studios are in the Louisville enclave of Watterson Park and its transmitter site is near Elizabeth, Indiana, west of the Ohio River. The station is owned by iHeartMedia.

== Station history ==
95.7 signed on as WQHI in April 1974 as HI 95, an automated Top 40 station using TM's "Stereo Rock" format. The first song played when HI 95 signed on was "Oh My My" by Ringo Starr.

In January 1981, WQHI was sold to the Wood family owners of Secret Communications and the people behind WEBN, so the station was changed to a AOR format as 96 FM WQMF. Within a short period of time, QMF was successful in toppling WLRS as the top Album Rock station in the market under Program Director Tom Owens. Many current well-known Louisville radio personalities appeared on the station. The early years consisted of Ron Clay and Terry Meiners on The Show With No Name. They used this morning show name after departing the morning show at WLRS where their "Morning Sickness" name had been trademarked by WLRS. After Meiners departed, Clay continued his morning run at QMF with Mason Dixon and later Alan Sells. Clay left WQMF in early 1986 for KZAP in Sacramento, CA. Until his return less than a year later. Clay continued his run with Uncle Ron's Asylum until his death in 1991. QMF then hired LRS 102's alum Rocky Knight to launch The Rocky & Troy Morning Show. Karen Bach-Markins, Duke Meyer, and Future Bob were also on QMF as well.

Their former mascot of WQMF was Wacky T. Weasel, who had the same snickering laugh that Muttley Mutt had on some legendary Hanna-Barbera shows such as Wacky Races, Dastardly & Muttley in Their Flying Machines, Yogi's Treasure Hunt, Fender Bender 500, & Yo Yogi!.

In the mid-1990s, WQMF switched to a classic rock format.

=== HD programming ===
On May 11, 2016, sister rock station WTFX dropped the active rock format and began stunting with a loop redirecting listeners to this station. It then flipped to urban seven hours later. WQMF began adding more recent rock to its playlist and moved to a mainstream rock format. The "Fox" active rock format moved to WQMF-HD2.

- HD1 is a digital simulcast of the traditional analog broadcast of WQMF.
- HD3 is a digital simulcast of sister station WTFX-FM, an urban contemporary format.
