= Poplar Hills, Kentucky =

- Unincorporated community
- Location of Poplar Hills in Jefferson County, Kentucky

- Location within the state of Kentucky Poplar Hills (the United States)
- Coordinates: 38°10′41″N 85°41′35″W
- Country: United States
- State: Kentucky
- County: Jefferson

Area
  - Total: 0.027 sq mi (0.07 km^{2})
  - Land: 0.027 sq mi (0.07 km^{2})
  - Water: 0 sq mi (0.00 km^{2})
- Elevation: 469 ft (143 m)

Population (2020)
  - Total: 380
  - Density: 14,000/sq mi (5,400/km^{2})
- Time zone: UTC-5 (Eastern (EST))
  - Summer (DST): UTC-4 (EDT)
- ZIP Code: 40213
- ZIP Code: 40218
- FIPS code: 21-62370
- GNIS feature ID: 2404551

Poplar Hills is a former home rule-class city in Jefferson County, Kentucky, United States. Per the 2020 census, the population was 380. On May 20, 2025, the city was dissolved by the Kentucky Department for Local Government due to failure to report basic information regarding its government.

== Geography ==
Poplar Hills was located in central Jefferson County. It was bordered to the northeast by Watterson Park and on all other sides by consolidated Louisville/Jefferson County. Kentucky Route 864 (Poplar Level Road) runs along the northeast border of the community. Downtown Louisville is 7 miles (11 km) to the northwest.

According to the United States Census Bureau, Poplar Hills had a total area of 0.03 square miles (0.07 km^{2}), all land.

== Demographics ==
Historical population
Census	Pop.	Note	%±
1990	377		—
2000	396		5.0%
2010	362		−8.6%
2020	380		5.0%
U.S. Decennial Census; 2010 2020

=== 2020 census ===
Poplar Hills city, Kentucky – Racial and ethnic composition Note: the US Census treats Hispanic/Latino as an ethnic category. This table excludes Latinos from the racial categories and assigns them to a separate category. Hispanics/Latinos may be of any race.
Race / Ethnicity (NH = Non-Hispanic)	Pop 2000	Pop 2010	Pop 2020	% 2000	% 2010	% 2020
White alone (NH)	157	42	42	39.65%	11.60%	11.05%
Black or African American alone (NH)	218	210	73	55.05%	58.01%	19.21%
Native American or Alaska Native alone (NH)	0	2	1	0.00%	0.55%	0.26%
Asian alone (NH)	3	4	0	0.76%	1.10%	0.00%
Native Hawaiian or Pacific Islander alone (NH)	0	0	0	0.00%	0.00%	0.00%
Other race alone (NH)	1	1	3	0.25%	0.28%	0.79%
Mixed race or Multiracial (NH)	8	2	9	2.02%	0.55%	2.37%
Hispanic or Latino (any race)	9	101	252	2.27%	27.90%	66.32%
Total	396	362	380	100.00%	100.00%	100.00%

=== 2000 Census ===
As of the census of 2000, there were 396 people, 234 households, and 77 families residing in the city. The population density was 17,036.0 inhabitants per square mile (6,577.6/km^{2}). There were 240 housing units at an average density of 10,324.8 per square mile (3,986.4/km^{2}). The racial makeup of the city was 40.15% White, 55.30% African American, 0.76% Asian, 1.52% from other races, and 2.27% from two or more races. Hispanic or Latino of any race were 2.27% of the population.

There were 234 households, out of which 15.0% had children under the age of 18 living with them, 15.4% were married couples living together, 12.8% had a female householder with no husband present, and 66.7% were non-families. 50.9% of all households were made up of individuals, and 3.0% had someone living alone who was 65 years of age or older. The average household size was 1.69 and the average family size was 2.36.

In the city, the population was spread out, with 14.4% under the age of 18, 20.7% from 18 to 24, 44.7% from 25 to 44, 17.4% from 45 to 64, and 2.8% who were 65 years of age or older. The median age was 28 years. For every 100 females, there were 85.9 males. For every 100 females age 18 and over, there were 85.2 males.

The median income for a household in the city was $26,964, and the median income for a family was $22,000. Males had a median income of $31,000 versus $22,083 for females. The per capita income for the city was $19,879. About 19.1% of families and 19.7% of the population were below the poverty line, including 31.9% of those under age 18 and 46.2% of those age 65 or over.
