= WVKY =

Radio station in Shelbyville, Kentucky

- Shelbyville, Kentucky; United States
- Broadcast area: Louisville metropolitan area
- Frequency: 101.7 MHz
- Branding: Froggy 101.7 - 104.9

Programming
- Format: Country music

Ownership
- Owner: CapCity Communications; (Southern Belle, LLC)
- Sister stations: WFKY, WFRT-FM, WKYL, WKYW

History
- First air date: September 30, 1989
- Former call signs: WCKD (1989); WCKP (1989–1992); WTHQ (1992–2002); WIBL (2002–2003); WJZO (2003–2005); WXTF (2005–2006); WLPP (2006–2007); WKRD-FM (2007–2012)
- Former frequencies: 101.3 MHz (1989–1996)

Technical information
- Licensing authority: FCC
- Facility ID: 60081
- Class: A
- ERP: 6,000 watts
- HAAT: 100 meters (330 ft)
- Transmitter coordinates: 38°12′48.00″N 85°10′16.00″W

Links
- Public license information: Public file; LMS
- Webcast: Listen live
- Website: froggykycountry.com

WVKY (101.7 MHz) is a commercial FM radio station licensed to Shelbyville, Kentucky, United States, and serving eastern portions of the Louisville metropolitan area. The station is owned by CapCity Communications under licensee Southern Belle, LLC. It airs a country music radio format which is simulcast on 104.9 WFKY in Frankfort. The station calls itself "Froggy 101.7 and 104.9," using a frog as its mascot.

== History ==
Logo as sports radio station WKRD-FM

The station was assigned the call sign WCKD on April 1, 1989. On July 8, 1989, the station changed its call sign to WCKP; it signed on September 30, 1989. The call letters were changed on August 31, 1992, to WTHQ, on May 17, 2002, to WIBL, on May 29, 2003, to WJZO, on December 13, 2005, to WXTF, on March 21, 2006, to WLPP, and on April 16, 2007, to WKRD-FM. Originally on 101.3 MHz, in 1996 WTHQ swapped frequencies with WMJM and moved to 101.7.

The station license was transferred to Aloha Station Trust LLC at the completion of the privatization of Clear Channel Communications, a forerunner of iHeartMedia, Inc., which owns seven stations in Louisville, including WHAS and WAMZ. The Aloha Station Trust temporarily operated the stations that Clear Channel was required to divest as a condition of the privatization transaction.

As a result of a sale from Aloha Station Trust LLC to CapCity Communications, on January 12, 2012, the station again changed its call sign, this time to WVKY.

WVKY AM was owned by Lawrence County Broadcasting Company in Lawrence County, Kentucky, General Manager Jim Bradley.
