= WVEZ =

Radio station in St. Matthews–Louisville, Kentucky

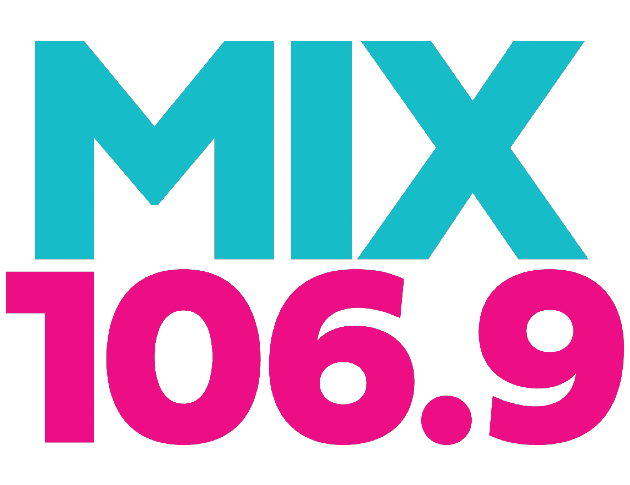

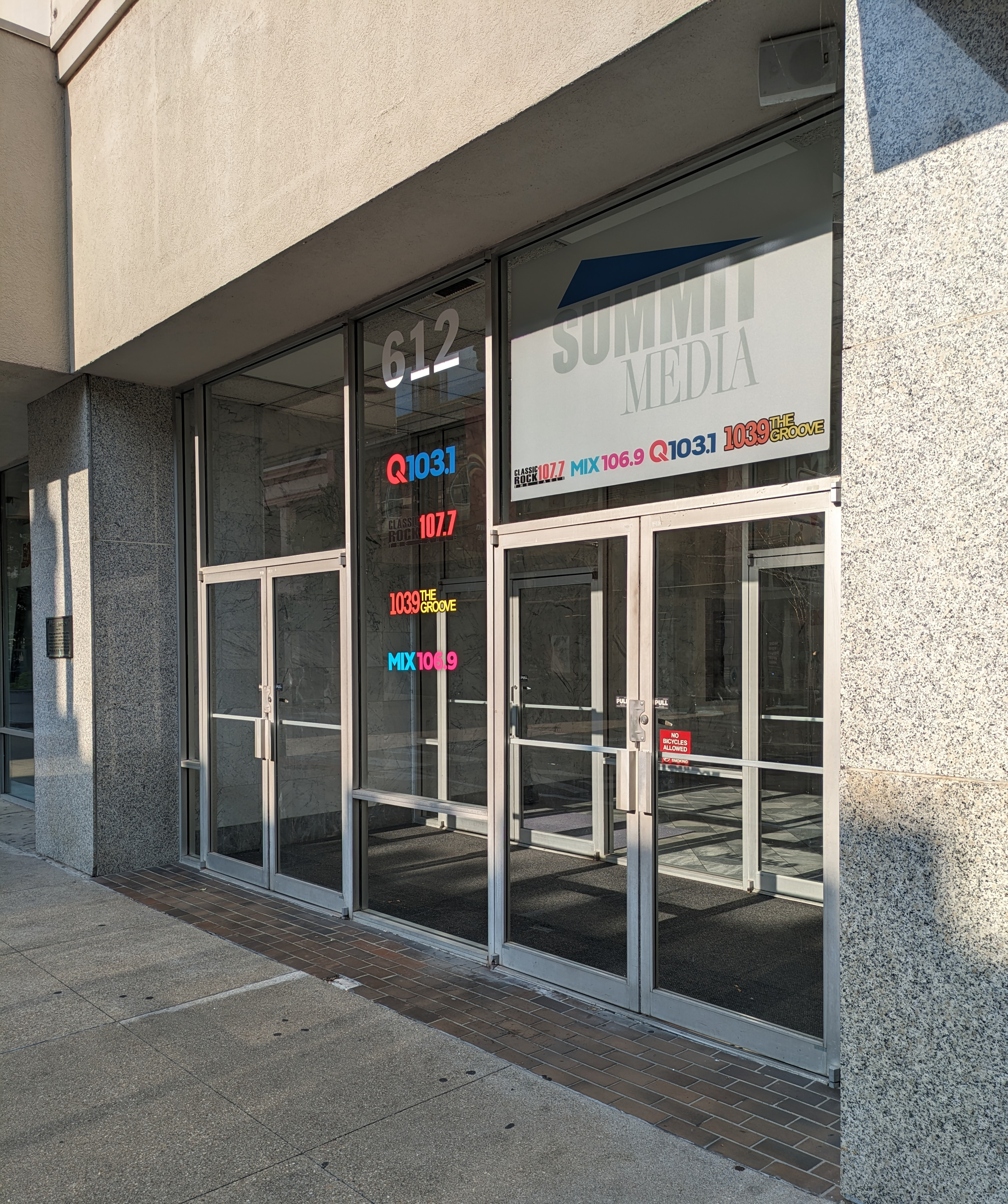
- Office in Louisville
- St. Matthews, Kentucky; United States
- Broadcast area: Louisville metropolitan area
- Frequency: 106.9 MHz (HD Radio)
- Branding: Mix 106.9

Programming
- Format: Hot adult contemporary
- Subchannels: HD2: Christian radio

Ownership
- Owner: SummitMedia; (SM-WVEZ, LLC)
- Sister stations: WQNU, WRKA, WSFR

History
- First air date: April 1967
- Former call signs: WKRX (1966–1974); WVEZ (1974–1988); WVEZ-FM (1988–1999)
- Call sign meaning: Former easy listening format

Technical information
- Licensing authority: FCC
- Facility ID: 53595
- Class: B
- ERP: 24,500 watts
- HAAT: 204 meters (669 ft)
- Transmitter coordinates: 38°22′19.00″N 85°49′33.00″W
- Translator: HD2: 92.3 W222CD (Elizabethtown)

Links
- Public license information: Public file; LMS
- Webcast: Listen live; Listen live (HD2)
- Website: mix1069.fm; pureradio.org (HD2)

WVEZ (106.9 FM) is a commercial hot adult contemporary radio station licensed to St. Matthews, Kentucky. Owned by SummitMedia, the station covers much of the Louisville metropolitan area. WVEZ's studios are located in Downtown Louisville and the transmitter is sited in nearby New Albany. Besides a standard analog transmission, WVEZ broadcasts over a single HD Radio channel, and is available online.

== History ==
The station signed on the air in April 1967 as WKRX in Louisville, airing the automated "Young Sound" format, a blend of soft adult contemporary and easy listening music from CBS Radio. It switched to a Schulke-produced Beautiful Music format in 1970. In 1974, it was acquired by Stoner Broadcasting and its call sign changed from WKRX to WVEZ. The EZ in the call letters represented the easy listening format.

The station continued to play the Schulke format until 1984, but remained Beautiful Music until 1986. In April 1986, the station switched to a satellite-delivered Soft Adult Contemporary format, before going with live disc jockeys and local programming in 1989. The station rebranded from "EZ107" to "Lite 106.9" in 1993. In 1999, the station was acquired by the Atlanta-based Cox Radio, Inc.

WVEZ's call letters were changed to WVEZ-FM in 1988. Its AM sister station at 790 kHz, now WKRD, changed its call sign to WVEZ. 106.9 remained WVEZ-FM until December 7, 1999.

WVEZ began a tradition in 1999 in which it flipped to exclusively Christmas music during the holiday season. The tradition continues to this day.

On July 20, 2012, Cox Radio, Inc. announced the sale of WVEZ and 22 other stations to SummitMedia LLC for $66.25 million. The sale was consummated on May 3, 2013. SummitMedia moved WVEZ's city of license from Louisville to St. Matthews, Kentucky, although the studios and transmitter remained in place.

On January 4, 2016, WVEZ rebranded from "Lite 106.9" to "106.9 Play."

On October 5, 2020, WVEZ flipped to Christmas music. While WVEZ has typically been one of the nation's earliest flippers (occasionally flipping in late October), the unusually early change to Christmas music is in part to provide a diversion during the COVID-19 pandemic in the United States. WVEZ was the third station to change that year, with two other early changing stations also citing COVID-19 for the exceptionally early holiday music.

At midnight on March 8, 2021, WVEZ shifted to Hot AC under the name “Mix 106.9”. The shift eliminated all music from before 2000 in their playlist.

On December 26, 2025, after their annual Christmas music run, WVEZ shifted back to AC while retaining the "Mix 106.9" branding. This shift readded 90's music into their catalog.

== Previous logo ==
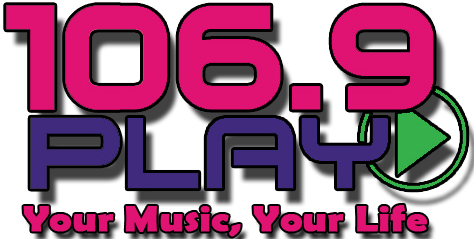
