= Matt Jones (radio host) =

American attorney, radio host and restaurateur

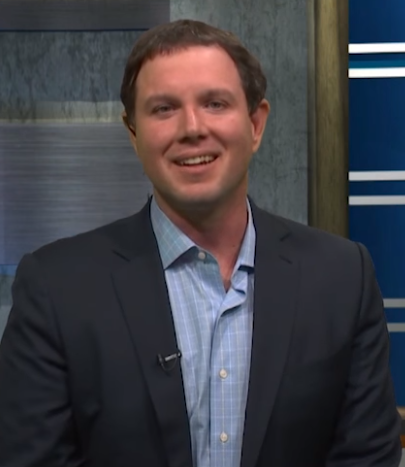
- Jones in 2016

Personal details
- Born: Matthew Harper Jones; August 28, 1978 (age 48) Lexington, Kentucky, U.S.
- Party: Democratic
- Education: Transylvania University (BA); Duke University (JD)

Matthew Harper Jones (born August 28, 1978) is an American attorney, businessman, radio host, author, and investor in Lexington, Kentucky.

== Early life and education ==
Jones was born in Lexington, Kentucky and raised in Middlesboro, Kentucky by his parents Larry and Karen. Karen practiced law in nearby Pineville, Kentucky, serving as the Commonwealth's Attorney for Bell County before retiring to attend the seminary. Jones attended Transylvania University on a full scholarship, before receiving a scholarship to Duke Law School, where he graduated second in his class.

== Kentucky Sports Radio ==
After graduating from Duke Law School, Jones returned to Kentucky to practice law, before founding Kentucky Sports Radio (colloquially known by its initials, "KSR"), a website and radio show dedicated to sports coverage involving the University of Kentucky Wildcats, in 2005. Jones bounced around several smaller radio shows, before launching KSR as a radio show, in 2010. The radio show's flagship stations are WKRD in Louisville and WLAP in Lexington, and it is syndicated to 50 radio stations, in 37 markets, in Kentucky and surrounding states. Jones and KSR also oversee a small network of podcasts based on the KSR brand and featuring personalities from both the KSR website and radio show.

Since founding Kentucky Sports Radio, Jones has used his media platform to discuss both sports and politics. In 2014, he hosted live one-on-one conversations with both then-incumbent Senate Minority Leader Sen. Mitch McConnell and his challenger Kentucky Secretary of State Alison Lundergan Grimes. The conversation with Grimes, on September 25, lasted 20 minutes and was noted by The Daily Beast as "perhaps her most substantive interview." Unlike Grimes, whose interview was in-studio, McConnell's interview was a spur-of-the-moment, unannounced phone call to the program, two weeks later, and was described as "emotional and combative."

The next year, Jones hosted a Republican gubernatorial primary debate between the four candidates vying to win the Republican nomination for Kentucky Governor. Jones has stated that he thinks this debate, three weeks before the primary election, contributed to Matt Bevin's 86-vote primary victory. Jones was also selected as the emcee for the annual Fancy Farm political picnic, the traditional start to Kentucky's fall campaign season, in August 2015.

During the 2023–24 college basketball season, Jones responded to a 35-point performance by Robbie Avila for Indiana State against Evansville with a tweet featuring an Avila highlights video. In the post, Jones gave Avila the nickname "Cream Abdul Jabbar", referring to Avila playing the same position as Kareem Abdul-Jabbar (center) and wearing goggles on the court. The nickname quickly went viral.

== Other ventures ==
From September 2016 until July 2019, Jones also hosted "Hey Kentucky!", a nightly sports and news recap program on WLEX-TV in Lexington, since also syndicated to WBNA in Louisville. On "Hey Kentucky!", Jones was joined, nightly, by rotating co-hosts, with some overlap with the KSR radio show.

In 2018, Jones opened Kentucky Sports Bar and Grille, a sports bar in Lexington connected to the KSR brand and colloquially known as "KSBar".

On January 5, 2021, Jones and Craig Greenberg, former CEO of 21c Museum Hotels, were announced as lead investors in a group that purchased a majority stake in Ohio Valley Wrestling (OVW), a Louisville-based independent professional wrestling promotion. Under the agreement, wrestling veteran Al Snow continues to run OVW's day-to-day operations. On August 21, 2023, Netflix announced a seven episode docuseries titled Wrestlers, based on OVW and offering a behind-the-scenes look at the world of professional wrestling. On April 7, 2025, Jones and Greenberg announced that they had sold majority ownership to Morley Sports Management, a United Kingdom-based sports consulting firm. Jones and Greenberg remained minority owners.

== Politics ==
Jones' background as a lawyer, frequent discussion of politics on KSR, and high name recognition among Kentuckians led many experts to consider him a potential candidate. He was courted by the Democratic Congressional Campaign Committee to run for the 6th district U.S. House seat occupied by Representative Andy Barr, in 2016, but ultimately, he declined to run. Jones had gone so far as to attend a "boot camp" for potential Democratic candidates in Washington, D.C., during the lead-in to the House race, but the experience left him disillusioned with the national Democratic Party. In a 2018 interview for Politico Magazine, he recalled one prominent member of Congress telling the attendees that positions on issues were far less important than campaign fundraising; Jones would call this "one of the most depressing things [he'd] ever heard."

Jones also considered running for Mitch McConnell's U.S. Senate in 2020 but he announced on November 15, 2019, that he would not enter the race. This public flirtation with the 2020 U.S. Senate race caused WLEX to permanently remove him from his role as host of "Hey Kentucky!”. In response, the next day, Jones announced that WLEX had permanently ended his run as host of "Hey Kentucky!"

The aforementioned Politico story added,

Defining Jones' political identity is a slippery task—even for those in Kentucky who listen to him every day. When pressed, he identifies as a "Southern populist progressive," wary of using the term "liberal" in his home state. He is a proponent of Obamacare and marijuana legalization, generally an advocate of free trade and lowering the corporate tax, bullish on union rights and a vocal opponent of corporate welfare. These stances almost universally find root not in party allegiance but in the effect on Kentucky’s working class, a mooring so deep that Jones says he would vote against his personal beliefs in the Senate—on coal, for instance—if he felt it was in the best interest of his constituents.

On August 15, Jones announced that he had been approached to write a book and had accepted. The book, tentatively titled Mitch, Please!, would take him around all of Kentucky's 120 counties, in order to make his case that McConnell had failed the citizens of Kentucky. Mitch, Please!: How Mitch McConnell Sold Out Kentucky (and America, Too), which was co-written with Chris Tomlin, was published in March 2020 and debuted 11th on the New York Times Best Sellers List. In his book, Jones is highly critical of McConnell and the impact of his decisions in his over 35 years in the U.S. Senate, at times, calling him "the most destructive force in American democracy" and stating that "[McConnell] will say anything, do anything, or take any position, if it means helping him gain more political power." Jones' criticisms of McConnell were met with some criticisms of the book, itself, comparing the story of the 120 county road trip to walking or dragging a dead dog, noting that the book would have been a "minor classic,” at half the size. In the final chapter, Jones explains his thought process behind not running against McConnell in the 2020 race, stating that his heart wasn't in it. Jones stated "I used the idea of a book about Mitch to write about Kentucky and explore my thought process."

While Jones identifies as a progressive, Politico has said that he "espouses a doctrine of empathy that you won’t hear from many liberals, today." Jones has said "I wish the people that I love didn’t like Donald Trump, but I understand why they do," and he claims to regularly talk to more conservatives than any other progressive in the U.S., estimating that 80% of his listeners voted for Trump in 2016. Jones' criticism of Kentucky political figures is not limited to Republicans; he has publicly labeled the state's Democratic Party as "a disaster.” At a Democratic banquet held the night before the 2016 Fancy Farm picnic, he blasted the party for abandoning working-class voters, focusing on liberal strongholds in Louisville and Lexington, and compromising on core values to appeal to conservatives.
