= WKYL =

Radio station in Lawrenceburg, Kentucky

Simulcasting WFRT-FM Frankfort
- Lawrenceburg, Kentucky; United States
- Broadcast area: Lexington, Kentucky; Frankfort, Kentucky
- Frequency: 102.1 MHz
- Branding: Passport Radio 103-7 & 102-1

Programming
- Format: Classic hits
- Affiliations: Compass Media Networks

Ownership
- Owner: CapCity Communications; (Southern Belle, LLC)
- Sister stations: WFRT, WKYW, WFKY, WVKY

History
- First air date: May 11, 1993
- Call sign meaning: We Keep You Listening; KentuckY Lawrenceburg

Technical information
- Licensing authority: FCC
- Facility ID: 22938
- Class: A
- ERP: 6,000 watts
- HAAT: 100 meters
- Transmitter coordinates: 38°1′37″N 84°52′59″W

Links
- Public license information: Public file; LMS
- Webcast: Listen live
- Website: mypassportradio.com

WKYL (102.1 FM) is a radio station broadcasting a unique classic hits format consisting of rock and pop music from the 1960s, 1970s, and 1980s. Licensed to Lawrenceburg, Kentucky, the station primarily serves areas of the Bluegrass region of Central Kentucky, including the Lexington metropolitan area. WKYL is currently owned by CapCity Communications and licensed under Southern Belle, LLC.

== History ==
From its sign-on in 1993 until July 1, 2011, the station programmed a popular Smooth Jazz format fed via satellite from the Broadcast Architecture Smooth Jazz Network. In 2011, Davenport Broadcasting, the station's previous owner, entered into a local marketing agreement with Eastern Kentucky University to allow WEKU to program a Classical music format on WKYL to complement the Public Radio format broadcast on WEKU.

On December 16, 2019, WKYL ended its relationship with Eastern Kentucky University after the latter announced just days earlier that it would be moving its classical music programming to online-only distribution; EKU explained that it was no longer financially able to program a second terrestrial broadcast station. Consequently, Davenport entered into a new time brokerage agreement with Frankfort-based CapCity Communications, resulting in a format change to classic hits for WKYL as a simulcast of WFRT. The two stations operate under the branding "Passport Radio 103-7 & 102-1". Davenport Broadcasting closed on its sale of the station to CapCity Communications in early 2020.
