= WFRT-FM =

Radio station in Frankfort, Kentucky

- Frankfort, Kentucky; United States
- Broadcast area: Shelbyville, Kentucky; Lexington metropolitan area
- Frequency: 103.7 MHz
- Branding: Passport Radio 103-7 & 102-1

Programming
- Format: Classic hits
- Affiliations: Compass Media Networks

Ownership
- Owner: CapCity Communications; (Southern Belle, LLC)
- Sister stations: WKYL, WFKY, WVKY, WKYW

History
- First air date: April 15, 1991 (as WKED-FM)
- Former call signs: WKED-FM (1991–2008); WSTV-FM (2008–2019)
- Call sign meaning: FRankforT

Technical information
- Licensing authority: FCC
- Facility ID: 1037
- Class: A
- ERP: 2,500 watts
- HAAT: 109 meters (358 ft)
- Transmitter coordinates: 38°13′17.00″N 84°54′52.00″W
- Repeater: 102.1 WKYL (Lawrenceburg)

Links
- Public license information: Public file; LMS
- Webcast: Listen live
- Website: mypassportradio.com

WFRT-FM (103.7 MHz) is a radio station broadcasting a unique classic hits format of rock and pop music from the 1960s, 1970s, and 1980s. Licensed to Frankfort, Kentucky, it primarily serves the Frankfort area (between Shelbyville and Lexington), but can be heard in much of the Lexington area. The station is owned by CapCity Communications and licensed to Southern Belle, LLC.

== History ==
Logo as WSTV-FM

The station was assigned the call sign WKED-FM on February 1, 1991; it signed on April 15, 1991, with an Adult Contemporary format branded as "D103-7", changing to "Star 103-7" a few years later. On April 1, 2008, the station changed its call sign to WSTV-FM when Clear Channel sold their Frankfort stations to Forever Communications. The station relaunched on June 9, 2008, with a Hot Adult Contemporary format, keeping its "Star 103-7" branding.

On March 25, 2019, the station changed its call sign to WFRT-FM. Three days later, WFRT-FM changed its format to a simulcast of classic hits-formatted WKYW (1490 AM), branded as "Passport Radio". On December 16, 2019, CapCity Communications took control of WKYL (102.1 FM) in Lawrenceburg via a local marketing agreement and began simulcasting the "Passport Radio" format on that station. CapCity Communications purchased WKYL from Davenport Broadcasting in early 2020.
