= West Buechel, Kentucky =

- City
- Location of West Buechel in Jefferson County, Kentucky

- Location within the state of Kentucky West Buechel (the United States)
- Coordinates: 38°11′42″N 85°40′04″W
- Country: United States
- State: Kentucky
- County: Jefferson

Area
  - Total: 0.65 sq mi (1.68 km^{2})
  - Land: 0.64 sq mi (1.66 km^{2})
  - Water: 0.0077 sq mi (0.02 km^{2})
- Elevation: 472 ft (144 m)

Population (2020)
  - Total: 1,370
  - Density: 2,143/sq mi (827.3/km^{2})
- Time zone: UTC-5 (Eastern (EST))
  - Summer (DST): UTC-4 (EDT)
- ZIP code: 40218
- Area code: 502
- FIPS code: 21-81624
- GNIS feature ID: 2405705
- Website: www.westbuechelky.gov

West Buechel is a home rule-class city in Jefferson County, Kentucky, United States. As of the 2020 census, West Buechel had a population of 1,370.

== Geography ==
West Buechel is located in central Jefferson County. It is bordered to the west by Watterson Park and on all other sides by consolidated Louisville/Jefferson County. U.S. Route 150 forms the northeast boundary of the city, while Newburg Road forms most of the southwest boundary. Downtown Louisville is 7 miles (11 km) to the northwest.

According to the United States Census Bureau, West Buechel has a total area of 0.62 square miles (1.6 km^{2}), of which 0.01 square miles (0.02 km^{2}), or 1.30%, are water.

== Demographics ==
Historical population
Census	Pop.	Note	%±
1960	504		—
1970	1,581		213.7%
1980	1,205		−23.8%
1990	1,587		31.7%
2000	1,301		−18.0%
2010	1,230		−5.5%
2020	1,370		11.4%
U.S. Decennial Census

As of the census of 2000, there were 1,301 people, 554 households, and 335 families residing in the city. The population density was 2,002.7 inhabitants per square mile (773.2/km^{2}). There were 583 housing units at an average density of 897.4 per square mile (346.5/km^{2}). The racial makeup of the city was 61.26% White, 25.98% African American, 7.15% Asian, 0.08% Pacific Islander, 3.23% from other races, and 2.31% from two or more races. Hispanic or Latino of any race were 7.23% of the population.

There were 554 households, out of which 31.0% had children under the age of 18 living with them, 41.0% were married couples living together, 14.3% had a female householder with no husband present, and 39.4% were non-families. 29.6% of all households were made up of individuals, and 6.3% had someone living alone who was 65 years of age or older. The average household size was 2.35 and the average family size was 2.95.

18% of West Buechel residents identify as having Yugoslavian ancestry, making West Buechel the most Yugoslavian city in the country.

In the city, the population was spread out, with 21.7% under the age of 18, 15.4% from 18 to 24, 37.8% from 25 to 44, 17.6% from 45 to 64, and 7.5% who were 65 years of age or older. The median age was 30 years. For every 100 females, there were 97.1 males. For every 100 females age 18 and over, there were 95.6 males.

The median income for a household in the city was $33,750, and the median income for a family was $35,588. Males had a median income of $22,400 versus $21,563 for females. The per capita income for the city was $16,562. About 14.7% of families and 15.8% of the population were below the poverty line, including 22.5% of those under age 18 and 12.6% of those age 65 or over.
