= WNRW =

Radio station in Prospect–Louisville, Kentucky

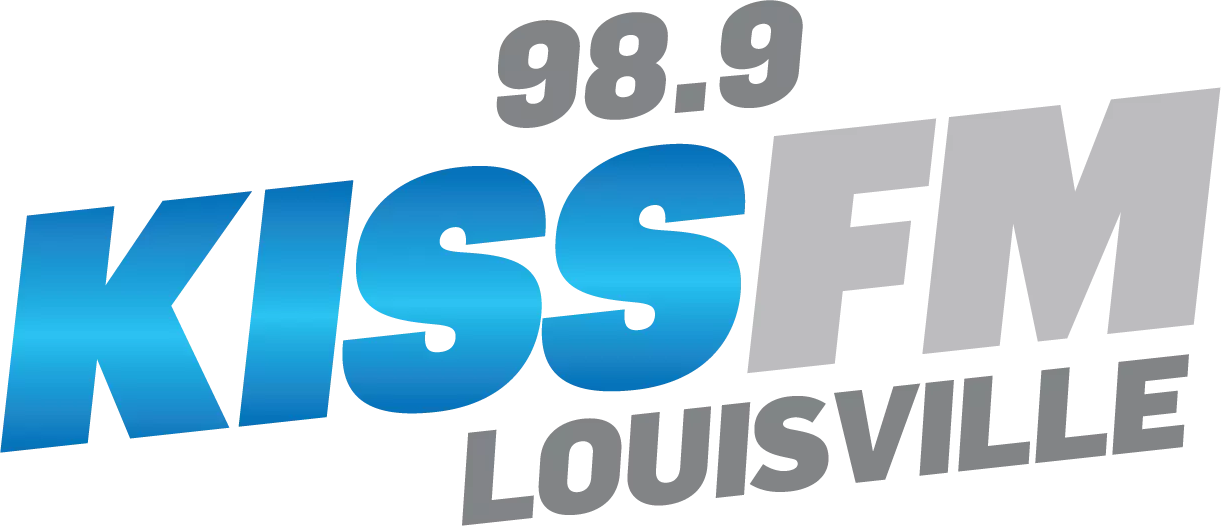
- Prospect, Kentucky; United States
- Broadcast area: Louisville metropolitan area
- Frequency: 98.9 MHz (HD Radio)
- Branding: 98.9 KISS FM

Programming
- Format: Contemporary hits
- Affiliations: Premiere Networks

Ownership
- Owner: iHeartMedia, Inc.; (iHM Licenses, LLC)
- Sister stations: WAMZ; WHAS; WKJK; WKRD; WQMF; WSDF; WTFX-FM

History
- First air date: 1962
- Former call signs: WSLM-FM (1967–1993); WKJK (1993–1996); WHKW (1996–1999); WQSH (1999–2000); WZTR (2000–2000); WZKF (2000–2010)
- Call sign meaning: Former "Radio Now" branding

Technical information
- Licensing authority: FCC
- Facility ID: 60706
- Class: C2
- ERP: 43,000 watts
- HAAT: 157 meters (515 ft)
- Transmitter coordinates: 38°11′31″N 85°31′11″W

Links
- Public license information: Public file; LMS
- Webcast: Listen live (via iHeartRadio)
- Website: kisslouisville.iheart.com

WNRW (98.9 FM) is a commercial radio station licensed to Prospect, Kentucky, United States, and serving the Louisville metropolitan area with a contemporary hits format as "98.9 KISS FM". It is owned by iHeartMedia, with studios on South 4th Street in the Louisville neighborhood of Watterson Park.

WNRW's transmitter is in east Louisville, off Tucker Station Road near Interstate 265.

== History ==
=== WSLM-FM ===
The station was originally based in Salem, Indiana, about 35 miles (56 km) northwest of Louisville, Kentucky. It signed on the air in 1962. The original call sign was WSLM-FM, the sister station to WSLM (1220 AM).

At first the two stations simulcast, with WSLM-FM developing some of its own programming by the late 1970s. WSLM-FM was powered at only 3,000 watts. It aimed its programming at listeners in the Salem area and could not easily be heard in Louisville.

=== 98.9 Kiss FM ===
By the 1990s, the station sought and got permission from the Federal Communications Commission (FCC) to increase its antenna height and power. That allowed it to target the lucrative Louisville radio market. It tried several formats, first with classic country as WKJK "KJ 98.9". Then, on May 17, 1996, it rebranded to "The Hawk" with the calls changing to WHKW soon after.

In September 1999, WHKW became the new home of WQSH and its modern AC format (which moved from 93.1). Then in 2000, WQSH evolved to hot AC, branded as "Star 98.9" with the calls changing to WZTR.

Later in 2000, the station changed to playing top 40 hits, calling itself "KISS-FM". It switched its call letters to WZKF. The station became a major competitor to Louisville's longtime top 40 leader WDJX. WZKF aired a rhythmic-leaning playlist while WDJX was more mainstream top 40.

=== 98.9 Radio Now ===
Logo as Radio Now, 2010–2020.

WZKF moved its city of license from Salem, Indiana, to the Louisville suburb of Prospect, Kentucky, on April 26, 2010. A few months later, on July 12, 2010, WZKF rebranded from "98.9 Kiss FM" to "98.9 Radio Now".

According to PD Mike Klein, "The name change and new look comes along with a signal upgrade and updated top 40/mainstream music mix with a rhythmic-leaning". He added that "the station is being re-branded with the 'NOW' moniker to give a fresh new approach delivering hit music to the people who need it 'NOW'". On July 19, 2010, WZKF changed its call sign to WNRW, to represent the "Radio Now" image.

=== Return to KISS-FM ===
On January 14, 2020, WNRW reverted to "KISS-FM" branding, with no other major format changes. This brings WNRW in line with many of iHeart's Top 40 stations around the U.S., including KIIS-FM in Los Angeles, WKSC-FM in Chicago and WXKS-FM in Boston, which also call themselves "KISS-FM".

== WNRW-HD2 ==
In 2008, WNRW began airing an HD Radio digital subchannel. The HD2 service began by carrying the Dance Top 40 Club Phusion format. It was replaced with iHeart's Evolution channel in late 2012.

In 2023, the HD2 subchannel was turned off.
