= WKRD (AM) =

Sports radio station in Louisville, Kentucky

Coordinates: 38°11′34″N 85°31′14″W

- Louisville, Kentucky; United States
- Broadcast area: Louisville, Kentucky
- Frequency: 790 kHz
- Branding: Sports Talk 790AM

Programming
- Format: Sports radio
- Affiliations: Fox Sports Radio; Kentucky Sports Radio; Cincinnati Bengals Radio Network

Ownership
- Owner: iHeartMedia; (iHM Licenses, LLC)
- Sister stations: WAMZ, WHAS, WKJK, WSDF, WNRW, WQMF, WTFX-FM

History
- First air date: 1936; 90 years ago
- Former call signs: WGRC, WAKY, WVEZ, WWKY, WXXA
- Call sign meaning: Station was the former flagship station for University of Louisville Cardinal sports

Technical information
- Licensing authority: FCC
- Facility ID: 53587
- Class: B
- Power: 5,000 watts (day); 1,000 watts (night)

Links
- Public license information: Public file; LMS
- Webcast: Listen live (via iHeartRadio)
- Website: 790louisville.iheart.com

WKRD (790 kHz) is a sports formatted AM radio station in the Louisville, Kentucky, metropolitan area. It is owned by iHeartMedia, and branded Sports Talk 790AM. The station's studios are located in the Louisville enclave of Watterson Park, and its transmitter site is in east Louisville, southwest of the I-64/I-265 interchange.

== History ==
790 AM in Louisville was originally WGRC, and featured a variety of programming, typical of radio in the pre-rock era. In 1958, broadcaster Gordon McLendon, a Top 40 radio pioneer best known for KLIF in Dallas, Texas, purchased WGRC. After stunting with the novelty record "The Purple People Eater", WGRC became WAKY on July 7, 1958, and immediately shot to the top of the Louisville ratings as the market's first Top 40 music station. WAKY (known affectionately to its listeners as "Wacky") competed with 1080 AM WKLO during the 1960s and 1970s, with WAKY usually being the dominant station of the two. The station's popular personalities included Bill Bailey ("The Duke of Louisville"), Dude Walker, Gary Burbank (later of CKLW, WHAS, and WLW), Mason Lee Dixon, and the late Bert Markert (known on the air as "Weird Beard"). The station solidified its mass appeal by playing a great deal of country and R&B product mixed in with the mainstream pop and rock, owing to the large audiences for both genres of music in the Louisville market and the lack of a 24-hour R&B/soul station at the time (1350 WLOU, the area's primary black-oriented station, was a daytimer).

Having lost listeners during the 1970s to FM rock stations such as WQMF and WLRS, WAKY softened its music format to a more adult contemporary sound in 1978, declaring, "The station you grew up with has grown up with you." This was followed by format changes to oldies in 1982, to automated beautiful music in June 1986, to automated country music, back to adult contemporary in March 1988 as WVEZ (dropping the heritage WAKY calls to reflect its simulcast with 106.9 FM), to classic country in August 1989 as WWKY, and then to a talk radio format in February 1991. On May 10, 2001, WWKY changed to the sports-talk format as 'WXXA ("Xtra Sports 790") before changing to the WKRD calls.

Sports programming that airs on WKRD includes NASCAR Sprint Cup, Xfinity Series and Truck Series, and Cincinnati Bengals football.

From August 2007 to February 2022, Louisville football and men's basketball have aired on WKRD when their games conflicted with University of Kentucky football and men's basketball on WHAS radio. On April 16, 2007, WKRD began simulcasting on WKRD-FM 101.7 (formerly WLPP).

Former logo

Cincinnati Reds games were broadcast on AM 790, before they were moved to 101.7 in favor of Louisville Bats games.

University of Louisville sports were broadcast on AM 790, before they were moved to 93.9 FM and 970 AM.

On January 5, 2023, WKRD was rebranded as "SportsTalk 790AM". This aligned with several programming moves consolidating Louisville's sports talk programming on the station, including the popular Kentucky Sports Radio show, which had spent the past decade on sister station WKJK.

In March 2024, WKRD was announced as the primary carrier of Racing Louisville FC's National Women's Soccer League broadcasts.
