= WFKY =

- Frankfort, Kentucky; United States
- Broadcast area: Lexington metro area
- Frequency: 104.9 MHz
- Branding: Froggy 101.7 - 104.9

Programming
- Format: Country
- Affiliations: Westwood One

Ownership
- Owner: CapCity Communications; (Southern Belle, LLC)
- Sister stations: WFRT-FM, WKYL, WKYW, WVKY

History
- First air date: January 1, 1967
- Former call signs: WKYW (1966–2007)
- Call sign meaning: Frankfort, Kentucky

Technical information
- Licensing authority: FCC
- Facility ID: 54567
- Class: A
- ERP: 3,400 watts
- HAAT: 86 meters (282 ft)
- Transmitter coordinates: 38°13′18″N 84°54′54″W

Links
- Public license information: Public file; LMS
- Webcast: Listen live
- Website: froggykycountry.com

WFKY (104.9 FM) is a radio station broadcasting a country music format. Licensed to Frankfort, Kentucky, United States, the station serves the Lexington metropolitan area. The station is owned by CapCity Communications.

WFKY was the longtime call sign of what is now WKYW 1490 AM.
