= WCHA (AM) =

Radio station in Chambersburg, Pennsylvania

- Chambersburg, Pennsylvania; United States
- Broadcast area: South Central Pennsylvania
- Frequency: 800 kHz
- Branding: Oldies 96.3

Programming
- Language: English
- Format: Oldies
- Network: The True Oldies Channel
- Affiliations: Pittsburgh Steelers

Ownership
- Owner: Connoisseur Media; (Alpha Media Licensee LLC)
- Sister stations: WDLD; WHAG; WIKZ; WQCM

History
- First air date: August 9, 1946
- Call sign meaning: Chambersburg

Technical information
- Licensing authority: FCC
- Facility ID: 10110
- Class: D
- Power: 1,000 watts (day); 196 watts (night)
- Transmitter coordinates: 39°55′41.3″N 77°41′43″W
- Translator: 96.3 W242BY (Chambersburg)
- Repeater: 1410 WHAG (Halfway, Maryland)

Links
- Public license information: Public file; LMS
- Website: www.oldies963.net

WCHA (800 kHz) is a commercial AM radio station licensed to Chambersburg, Pennsylvania, and serving Franklin County, Pennsylvania. It simulcasts an oldies format with WHAG in Hagerstown, Maryland. WCHA and WHAG are owned and operated by Connoisseur Media. Most programming comes from The True Oldies Channel, programmed and hosted by New York City DJ Scott Shannon. WCHA also carries Pittsburgh Steelers football.

By day, WCHA is powered at 1,000 watts non-directional. Because 800 AM is a Mexican clear channel frequency reserved for Class A station XEROK in Ciudad Juarez, WCHA reduces power to 196 watts at night to avoid interference. WCHA is also heard on 250-watt FM translator W242BY at 96.3 MHz.

== History ==
The station signed on the air on August 9, 1946, at 6 a.m.

On September 1, 1989, WCHA began broadcasting in C-QUAM AM stereo.

== Translator ==
Call sign	Frequency	City of license	FID	ERP (W)	Class	FCC info
W242BY	96.3 FM	Chambersburg, Pennsylvania	145587	250	D	LMS
