= WMJM =

Radio station in Jeffersontown, Kentucky

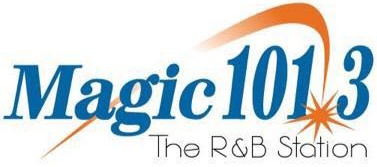
- Jeffersontown, Kentucky; United States
- Broadcast area: Louisville metropolitan area
- Frequency: 101.3 MHz
- Branding: Magic 101.3

Programming
- Format: Urban adult contemporary

Ownership
- Owner: Connoisseur Media; (Alpha Media Licensee LLC)
- Sister stations: WDJX; WGHL; WGZB-FM; WXMA

History
- First air date: December 1, 1978
- Former call signs: WZZX (1978–1981); WJYL (1981–1989); WLSY (1989); WLSY-FM (1989–1996)
- Former frequencies: 101.7 MHz (1978–1996)
- Call sign meaning: "Magic of Music"

Technical information
- Licensing authority: FCC
- Facility ID: 10322
- Class: A
- ERP: 2,000 watts
- HAAT: 59 meters (194 ft)
- Transmitter coordinates: 38.228°N 85.639°W

Links
- Public license information: Public file; LMS
- Webcast: Listen live
- Website: www.1013online.com

WMJM (101.3 FM "Magic 101.3") is an urban adult contemporary station licensed to serve Jeffersontown, Kentucky, owned and operated by Connoisseur Media. The station's studios are located in downtown Louisville, while its transmitter site is located at Wright Tower in east Louisville.

== History ==
The station signed on in 1978 as WZZX with an album-oriented rock format. WZZX switched to an adult contemporary music format as WJYL "The Joy of Louisville" in 1981. Following a sale in 1984, WJYL adopted an urban contemporary format. On January 5, 1989, the station began stunting with a loop of "Don't Let the Sun Catch You Crying" by Gerry and the Pacemakers. It would be accompanied with a return to a soft AC format, becoming WLSY-FM ("Lite and Sunny")

WLSY-FM was sold to the owners of mainstream urban contemporary WGZB-FM in 1994, and became an urban adult contemporary-formatted sister station to the younger-skewing WGZB. The call sign was changed to WMJM in 1996; shortly afterward, the station moved from its original 101.7 frequency to 101.3 in a swap with WTHQ, allowing the WMJM signal to move farther west and avoid violating FCC antenna separation distance rules with the former WLRS on 102.3 MHz.

WMJM was acquired by Alpha Media in July 2014, as part of its purchase of Main Line Broadcasting.
