= WIKZ =

Radio station in Chambersburg, Pennsylvania

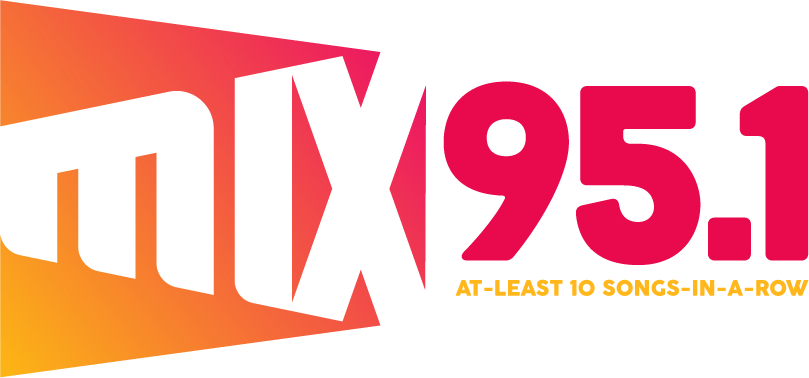
- Chambersburg, Pennsylvania; United States
- Broadcast area: Hagerstown metropolitan area
- Frequency: 95.1 MHz
- RDS: PI: 6ae5; PS: Mix 95.1 Title Artist; RT: Mix 95.1 Title Artist
- Branding: Mix 95.1

Programming
- Format: Hot adult contemporary
- Affiliations: Skyview Networks; Syndication Networks

Ownership
- Owner: Connoisseur Media; (Alpha Media Licensee LLC)
- Sister stations: WCHA; WDLD; WHAG; WQCM

History
- First air date: April 19, 1948
- Former call signs: WCHA-FM (1948–1971); WCHM (1971–1977)
- Former frequencies: 95.9 MHz (1948–1959)

Technical information
- Licensing authority: FCC
- Facility ID: 10108
- Class: B
- ERP: 50,000 watts
- HAAT: 137 meters (449 ft)
- Transmitter coordinates: 39°55′41.3″N 77°41′43″W

Links
- Public license information: Public file; LMS
- Webcast: Listen live; Listen live (via Audacy); Listen live (via iHeartRadio)
- Website: www.mix95.com

WIKZ (95.1 MHz, Mix 95.1) is a commercial hot adult contemporary formatted broadcast radio station, switching to Christmas music from mid-November through Christmas day, licensed to Chambersburg, Pennsylvania serving the Hagerstown metropolitan area. WIKZ is owned and operated by Connoisseur Media.

== History ==
The station went on the air as WCHA-FM on April 19, 1948, on 95.9 MHz. In 1971, the station changed its call sign to WCHM. On June 30, 1977, the station changed its call sign to the current WIKZ.

On January 9, 1959, the power was changed from 700 watts to 3,000 watts, and the frequency was changed from 95.9 MHz to the current 95.1 MHz.

=== 1977–1992: Top 40 ===
On June 30, 1977, at midnight, the call letters were changed to WIKZ, and the station adopted a contemporary hit radio format as WIKZ-95.

On August 31, 1979, at 5 pm, the power was changed from 3,000 watts to 50,000 watts.

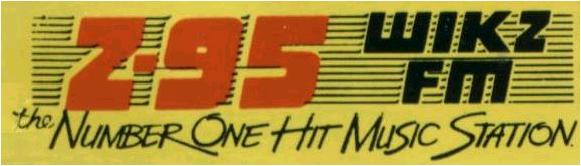
Logo used from 1984 until 1992.

In January 1984, the station rebranded as Z-95. The station formerly carried Rick Dees Weekly Top 40 and American Top 40 with Casey Kasem.

On August 11, 1986, at 5:30 am, WIKZ debuted the new morning show Alexander & Harding Morning Show (originally known as Alexander & Harding in the Morning and later Rick & Lisa Morning Show from 1986, until they left the Morning Show on February 29, 2024).

By 1991, the Top 40 format was starting to decline due to the rise of alternative rock, hip-hop and country. On March 6, at noon, WIKZ began stunting with all-country music, as Country 95, then all-beautiful music, as E-Z95, then all-classic rock, then all-comedy, then all-jazz, more country, disco music and oldies. WIKZ returned to a CHR format the following day at noon.

=== 1992–1995: Adult contemporary ===
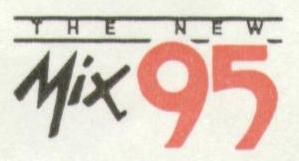
Logo used from 1992 until 1995.

On March 4, 1992, WIKZ changed its format from Top 40/CHR to adult contemporary, branded as "Mix 95".

=== 1995–present: Hot adult contemporary ===
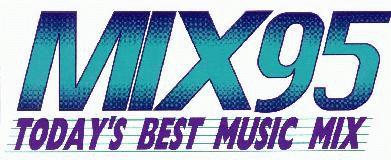
Logo used from 1995 until 2000.

In March 1995, WIKZ changed its format from adult contemporary to hot adult contemporary, while retaining the "Mix 95" branding. In May 2025, Alpha Media was merged with Connoisseur Media, resulting in new ownership of the station.

== Former logos ==
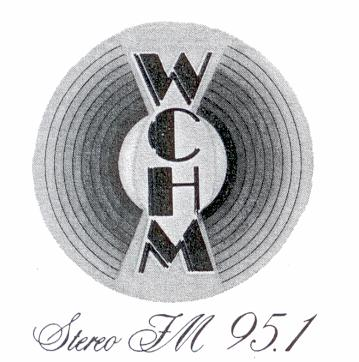
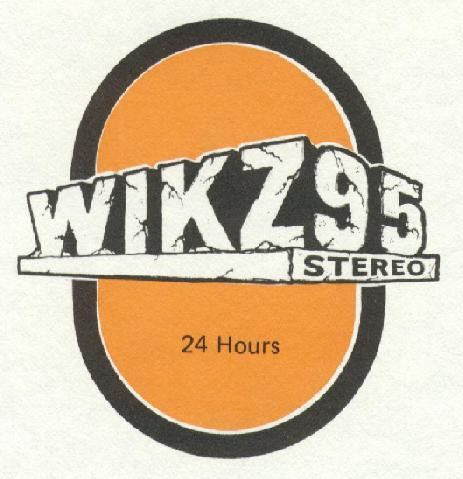
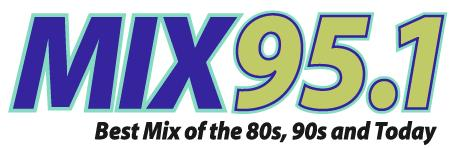
