= WHAG (AM) =

Oldies radio station in Halfway, Maryland

Simulcast with WCHA, Chambersburg
- Halfway, Maryland; United States
- Broadcast area: Hagerstown metropolitan area
- Frequency: 1410 kHz
- Branding: Oldies 96.3

Programming
- Format: Oldies
- Network: The True Oldies Channel
- Affiliations: Pittsburgh Steelers

Ownership
- Owner: Connoisseur Media; (Alpha Media Licensee LLC)
- Sister stations: WCHA; WDLD; WIKZ; WQCM

History
- First air date: June 9, 1962
- Former call signs: WDDW (1962)
- Call sign meaning: Hagerstown

Technical information
- Licensing authority: FCC
- Facility ID: 23466
- Class: D
- Power: 1,000 watts (day); 99 watts (night)
- Transmitter coordinates: 39°37′3.3″N 77°44′16″W

Links
- Public license information: Public file; LMS
- Website: www.oldies963.net

WHAG (1410 kHz) is an oldies formatted broadcast radio station licensed to Halfway, Maryland, serving the Hagerstown metropolitan area. WHAG is owned and operated by Connoisseur Media. WHAG simulcasts sister station WCHA (800 AM) in Chambersburg, Pennsylvania.

== History ==
The station went on the air as WHAG on June 9, 1962, at 5:45 a.m.
