= WSFR =

Coordinates: 38.174°N 85.914°W

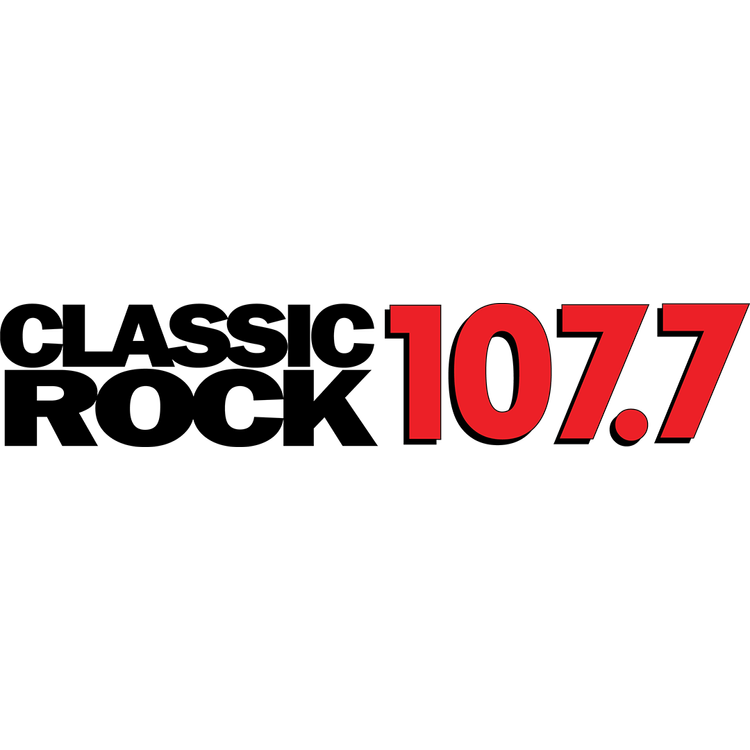
- Corydon, Indiana; United States
- Broadcast area: Louisville metropolitan area
- Frequency: 107.7 MHz
- Branding: Classic Rock 107.7

Programming
- Format: Classic rock

Ownership
- Owner: SummitMedia; (SM-WSFR, LLC)
- Sister stations: WRKA; WQNU; WVEZ

History
- First air date: May 24, 1994 (as WHKW)
- Former call signs: WEAJ (August–October 1993); WWSN-FM (October 1993-1994); WHKW (1994–1995); WHKW-FM (1995–1996)

Technical information
- Licensing authority: FCC
- Facility ID: 55499
- Class: B1
- ERP: 7,400 watts
- HAAT: 182 meters (597 ft)

Links
- Public license information: Public file; LMS
- Webcast: Listen live
- Website: www.classicrock1077.fm

WSFR (107.7 FM, "Classic Rock 107.7") is a commercial radio station that plays classic rock from the 1960s, 1970s, and 1980s. Its studios are in the SummitMedia facility on Chestnut Centre in Downtown Louisville and its city of license is Corydon, Indiana.

WSFR is a Class B1 FM station. Its transmitter is off Lotticks Corner Road SE near Elizabeth, Indiana, west of the Ohio River. It shares its tower with WAY-FM station 105.9 WAYK and Alpha Media's 96.5 WGZB. The signal covers parts of Indiana and Kentucky.

== History ==
Before going on the air, the station was issued a construction permit with the call sign WEAJ in August 1993. It received the WWSN-FM call letters in October 1993. On May 24, 1994, the station officially signed on. It originally had a country music format as "The Hawk". The call sign switched to WHKW to match the Hawk branding. Six months after going on the air, the station was sold to Regent Broadcasting for $2.6 million.

In May 1996, sister station WQLL's 1970s hits format and "Cool" branding moved to WHKW from 103.9 FM. The station relaunched as classic hits-formatted "Star 107.7". In addition, the station changed call letters to WSFR. Over time, the classic hits sound evolved to classic rock.

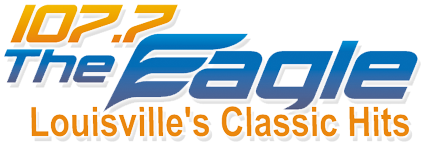
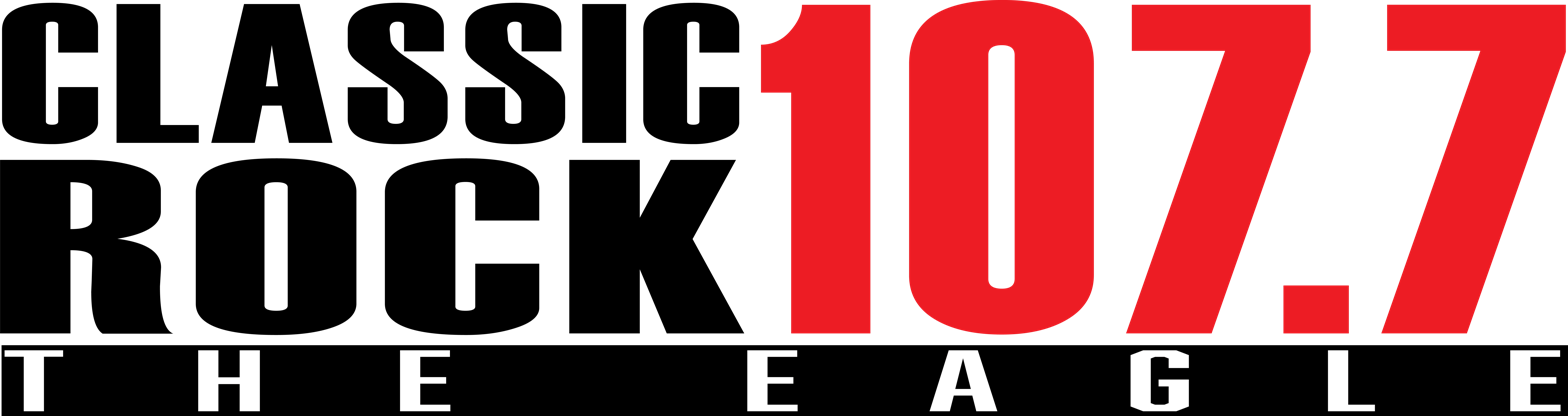
Logos as "107.7 The Eagle"

On October 28, 2011, WSFR changed its branding to "107.7 The Eagle". Even though the format remained classic rock, it began using the slogan "Louisville Classic Hits". The station was owned by Atlanta-based Cox Radio, Inc.

On July 20, 2012, Cox Radio announced the sale of WSFR and 22 other stations to SummitMedia for $66.25 million. The sale was consummated on May 3, 2013.

On March 8, 2021, WSFR shifted its format from a classic hits and classic rock hybrid to all classic rock. It was still under the "107.7 The Eagle" branding, but was emphasizing the "Classic Rock" slogan.

On December 20, 2022, WSFR dropped the "Eagle" branding and began calling itself "Classic Rock 107.7".
