= WQCM =

Radio station in Greencastle, Pennsylvania

- Greencastle, Pennsylvania; United States
- Broadcast area: South Central Pennsylvania; Western Maryland; Eastern Panhandle of West Virginia
- Frequency: 94.3 MHz
- Branding: 94.3 WQCM

Programming
- Format: Classic rock
- Affiliations: United Stations Radio Networks; Pittsburgh Steelers Radio Network

Ownership
- Owner: Connoisseur Media (pending sale to Family Life Ministries); (Alpha Media Licensee LLC)
- Sister stations: WCHA; WDLD; WHAG; WIKZ

History
- First air date: May 12, 1967
- Former call signs: WKSL (1967–1997); WCHA-FM (1997–2001); WIHR (2001–2002)
- Call sign meaning: Queen City Media

Technical information
- Licensing authority: FCC
- Facility ID: 25128
- Class: A
- Power: 3,500 watts
- HAAT: 131 meters (430 ft)
- Transmitter coordinates: 39°47′29.3″N 77°40′28.9″W

Links
- Public license information: Public file; LMS
- Webcast: Listen live
- Website: www.wqcmfm.com

WQCM (94.3 FM) is a classic rock formatted broadcast radio station licensed to Greencastle, Pennsylvania, serving Hagerstown, Maryland/Chambersburg, Pennsylvania. WQCM is owned and operated by Connoisseur Media.

== History ==
The station went on the air as WKSL on May 12, 1967, at 6 am.

On January 31, 1997, the call letters were changed to WCHA-FM, and the station adopted a country music format as 94.3 Kiss Country.

On May 4, 2001, WCHA-FM rebranded as "I94.3".

On October 2, 2026 Connoisseur Media announced that it would sell the station to Family Life Ministries and that the station is expected to drop its classic rock format and flip to a Christian format.
