= WQNU =

Radio station in Lyndon, Kentucky

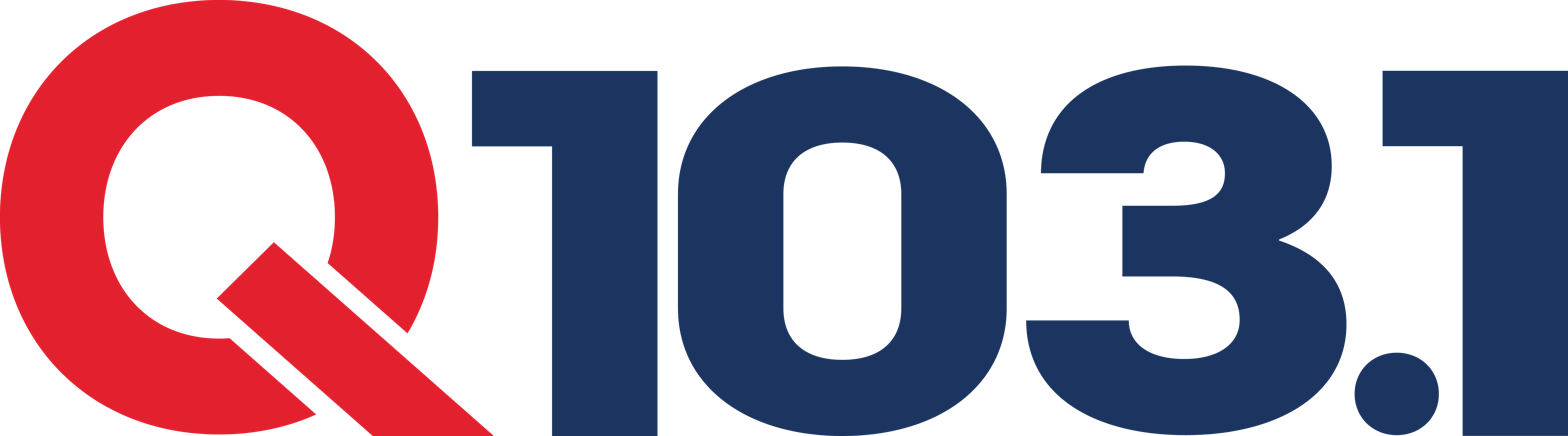
- "Q103.1" Logo

Lyndon, Kentucky; United States
- Broadcast area: Louisville metropolitan area
- Frequency: 103.1 MHz (HD Radio)
- Branding: New Country Q103.1

Programming
- Format: Country
- Affiliations: Compass Media Networks

Ownership
- Owner: SummitMedia; (SM-WQNU, LLC)
- Sister stations: WRKA, WSFR, WVEZ

History
- First air date: October 19, 1966
- Former call signs: WSTM (1966–1978); WNUU (1978–1980); WRKA (1980–2008)
- Call sign meaning: "Q103.1: New Country"

Technical information
- Licensing authority: FCC
- Facility ID: 20332
- Class: C2
- ERP: 23,000 watts
- HAAT: 169 meters (554 ft)
- Transmitter coordinates: 38°19′28.20″N 85°33′0.10″W

Links
- Public license information: Public file; LMS
- Webcast: Listen live
- Website: qlouisville.com

WQNU (103.1 FM, "New Country Q103.1") is a commercial radio station licensed to Lyndon, Kentucky, United States, and serving the Louisville metropolitan area. Owned by SummitMedia, it features a country music format. The studios are at Chestnut Centre on South 4th Street in downtown Louisville.

WQNU's transmitter is sited on Hitt Road in Louisville, off Riverside Expressway (Interstate 71).

== History ==
=== WSTM, WNUU, WRKA ===
The station signed on the air on October 19, 1966. The original call sign was WSTM, with the letters referring to the original city of license, St. Matthews, Kentucky. It was a Class A station, powered at 2,950 watts, a fraction of its current output. It was owned by J. W. Dunavent and was sold four times in its first 10 years of broadcasting. In the late 1970s, it aired a disco music format.

The station switched its call letters to WNUU on August 28, 1978. On New Year's Day, 1980, the station changed its call sign to WRKA. As WRKA, it aired an adult contemporary music format.

In 1982, WRKA tried a short-lived Top 40 format. Two years later, in 1984, it returned to its adult contemporary format. Radio personality Glenn Beck was the morning drive time host at one point. In January 1989, the station adopted an oldies format.

=== WQNU ===
On July 18, 2008, at 2:30 p.m., after playing Hello, Goodbye by The Beatles, it broadcast a farewell message from the station's program director going into a commercial break. WRKA then aired a montage of station moments themed to American Pie by Don McLean that ended on the lyric The day the music died, which was followed by one last jingle. After a minute of static (through which the ending of Beginnings by Chicago could be faintly heard), the station began stunting by introducing a "new" format as News/Talk 103.1 WRKA, complete with fake reports before playing a fake "Breaking Fox News Alert" report of power outages around the state.

That led into the introduction of "New Country Q103.1" at 3 p.m., launching with Kid Rock’s "All Summer Long". The same day, the station changed call letters to the current WQNU. The former WRKA call sign is now used on a sister station in the Louisville market.

On July 20, 2012, Cox Radio, Inc. announced the sale of WQNU and 22 other stations to Summit Media LLC for $66.25 million. The sale was consummated on May 3, 2013. Summit Media has continued to broadcast a country music format on WQNU, competing with 97.5 WAMZ, owned by iHeartMedia.

== Notable alumni ==
- Glenn Beck

== Previous Logos ==
Previous Logo (1989–2008)

Previous Logo (2008–2021)
