= WDLD =

Radio station in Halfway, Maryland

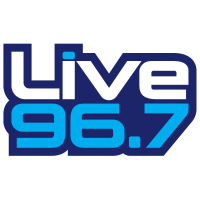
- Halfway, Maryland; United States
- Broadcast area: Hagerstown metropolitan area
- Frequency: 96.7 MHz
- RDS: PI: 5db5; PS: Live 96.7 Title Artist; RT: Live 96.7 Title Artist
- Branding: Live 96-7

Programming
- Language: English
- Format: Rhythmic contemporary
- Affiliations: Compass Media Networks; Skyview Networks; Syndication Networks

Ownership
- Owner: Connoisseur Media; (Alpha Media Licensee LLC)
- Sister stations: WCHA; WHAG; WIKZ; WQCM

History
- First air date: January 1965
- Former call signs: WHAG-FM (1965–1970); WQCM (1970); WHAG-FM (1970–1974); WQCM (1974–2002)
- Call sign meaning: Sounds like "Wild" (former branding)

Technical information
- Licensing authority: FCC
- Facility ID: 23469
- Class: A
- ERP: 4,800 watts
- HAAT: 50 meters (160 ft)
- Transmitter coordinates: 39°37′3.3″N 77°44′15.9″W

Links
- Public license information: Public file; LMS
- Webcast: Listen live; Listen live (via Audacy); Listen live (via iHeartRadio)
- Website: www.live967.com

WDLD (96.7 MHz, Live 96-7) is a commercial radio station licensed to Halfway, Maryland. Owned by Connoisseur Media, it broadcasts a rhythmic contemporary format serving the Hagerstown metropolitan area.

== History ==
The station went on the air as WHAG-FM in January 1965.

In 1975, WQCM changed its format from country music to album-oriented rock.

On March 28, 1977, WQCM changed its format from album-oriented rock to Top 40/CHR, branded as "97-Q".

On August 30, 2002, at noon, WQCM moved down the dial from 96.7 to 94.3, and began stunting with a loop of Wild Thing by Tone Loc. Five hours later, the station flipped to rhythmic contemporary branded as "Wild 96.7". The first song on "Wild" was "Hot in Herre" by Nelly.

On November 1, 2018, WDLD rebranded from Wild 96-7 to Live 96-7, segueing from rhythmic contemporary to a mainstream CHR format while retaining as a rhythmic Top 40 station.
