= WKYW (AM) =

Radio station in Frankfort, Kentucky

- Frankfort, Kentucky; United States
- Broadcast area: Shelbyville; Lexington–Fayette metropolitan area
- Frequency: 1490 kHz
- Branding: 93.5 The Goat

Programming
- Language: English
- Format: Classic rock
- Affiliations: Compass Media Networks

Ownership
- Owner: CapCity Communications; (Southern Belle Licenses, LLC)
- Sister stations: WFKY; WFRT-FM; WKYL; WVKY

History
- First air date: March 18, 1946
- Former call signs: WFKY (1946–2007)

Technical information
- Licensing authority: FCC
- Facility ID: 74609
- Class: C
- Power: 1,000 watts
- Transmitter coordinates: 38°12′12″N 84°54′49″W
- Translator: 93.5 W228CL (Frankfort)

Links
- Public license information: Public file; LMS
- Webcast: Listen live
- Website: www.goatrocksky.com/home

WKYW (1490 AM) is a commercial radio station licensed to Frankfort, Kentucky, United States, and owned by CapCity Communications. It airs a classic rock format branded "93.5 The Goat" reflecting its relay on FM translator W228CL (93.5 FM).

The transmitter is located in Frankfort off of Devils Hollow Road (KY 1005).

== History ==
The station signed on the air on March 18, 1946. It was powered at 250 watts and was owned by the Frankfort Broadcasting Company. For most of its history, it had the call sign WFKY, standing for Frankfort, Kentucky. Those call letters are now on sister station WFKY 104.9 FM.

In 2007, 1490 WFKY was acquired by Clear Channel Communications. Clear Channel (forerunner to today's iHeartMedia) switched the station's call letters to WKYW and its format to classic hits, branded as "Passport Radio 1490".

In 2015, FM translator W228CL began broadcasting on FM frequency 93.5 MHz as a simulcast of WKYW.

On April 1, 2021, WKYW and W228CL split from their simulcast with WFRT and WKYL and launched a hot adult contemporary format, branded as "Pop Radio 93.5".

On January 2, 2026, WKYW and W228CL changed to classic rock, branded as “93.5 The Goat”.

== Translator ==
Broadcast translator for WKYW
Call sign	Frequency	City of license	FID	ERP (W)	Class	Transmitter coordinates	FCC info
W228CL	93.5 FM	Frankfort, Kentucky	145358	250	D	38°13′18″N 84°54′54″W	LMS
