= WAMZ =

Radio station in Louisville, Kentucky

Louisville, Kentucky; United States
- Broadcast area: Louisville metropolitan area
- Frequency: 97.5 MHz (HD Radio)
- Branding: 97.5 WAMZ

Programming
- Format: Country music
- Subchannels: HD2: WHAS simulcast
- Affiliations: Compass Media Networks; Premiere Networks

Ownership
- Owner: iHeartMedia; (iHM Licenses, LLC)
- Sister stations: WTFX-FM, WQMF, WNRW, WSDF, WKRD, WHAS, WKJK

History
- First air date: September 7, 1966; 59 years ago (as WHAS-FM)
- Former call signs: WHAS-FM (1966–1975); WNNS (1975–1977)

Technical information
- Licensing authority: FCC
- Facility ID: 11921
- Class: C1
- ERP: 100,000 watts
- HAAT: 205 meters (673 ft)
- Transmitter coordinates: 38°3′49″N 85°43′52″W

Links
- Public license information: Public file; LMS
- Webcast: WAMZ Listen Live
- Website: wamz.iheart.com

WAMZ (97.5 FM) is a commercial radio station in Louisville, Kentucky. It airs a country music format and is owned by iHeartMedia The studios are in the central part of Watterson Park. WAMZ carries two nationally syndicated radio programs: The Bobby Bones Show in morning drive time and After Midnite with Granger Smith overnights.

WAMZ is a Class C station with an effective radiated power (ERP) of 100,000 watts. (Most Louisville FM stations are Class B or A, with only a fraction of that power.) The transmitter site is on Brooks Hill Road in Brooks, Kentucky. WAMZ has always been a sister station to Louisville's most powerful AM station, WHAS 840 AM.

== History ==
=== WCJT and WHAS-FM ===
Experimental W9XEK began on July 22, 1944, at 45.5 MHz, on the original FM band. A second FM station was established on the newer FM band on April 20, 1947, when WCJT started at 99.7 FM, co-owned with WHAS. The WCJT call sign represented the initials of The Courier-Journal and Louisville Times, which were owned by the Bingham family. By the following year, W9XEK was taken off the air and WCJT became WHAS-FM. Few people owned FM radio receivers in that era. Seeing little chance to make it profitable, the Binghams returned WHAS-FM's license to the FCC on December 31, 1950. The 99.7 frequency later became the home for WKLO-FM (now WDJX).

=== Second incarceration of WHAS-FM and WNNS (1966–1977) ===
A second WHAS-FM began broadcasting on September 7, 1966. It broadcast at 97.5 MHz with a 100,000-watt transmitter, airing an automated classical music format. The Binghams ran the station as a public service with almost no advertising. This format lasted until September 3, 1975, when WHAS-FM was renamed WNNS and adopted the NBC Radio Network's "News and Information Service" (NIS) all-news radio format. Public station WFPK, which also ran a classical programming schedule, received the WHAS-FM music library as a donation from the Binghams.

=== WAMZ Country ===
NBC announced in 1976 that it would be discontinuing the NIS news network in early 1977. At midnight on February 28, 1977, WNNS's format was changed to country music. It used Drake-Chenault's "Great American Country" format under the new call sign WAMZ. Although automated, the station became the first country FM stereo station in Louisville. The first song played on WAMZ was "She's Just An Old Love Turned Memory" by Charley Pride.

In 1979, radio personality Coyote Calhoun was hired as program director and morning host. Calhoun was best known as a disc jockey at Top 40 powerhouse WAKY 790 AM. Under his leadership, WAMZ became one of the most successful country radio stations in the U.S. Calhoun retired on December 3, 2014, after 35 years at WAMZ.

San Antonio-based Clear Channel Communications acquired WAMZ and WHAS (AM) in 1986. In 2014, Clear Channel changed its name to the current iHeartMedia.
