= WTFX-FM =

Radio station in Clarksville, Indiana

- Clarksville, Indiana; United States
- Broadcast area: Louisville metropolitan area
- Frequency: 93.1 MHz (HD Radio)
- Branding: Real 93.1

Programming
- Format: Mainstream urban
- Subchannels: HD2: 70s music
- Affiliations: Premiere Networks

Ownership
- Owner: iHeartMedia; (iHM Licenses, LLC)
- Sister stations: WAMZ, WHAS, WKJK, WKRD, WSDF, WNRW, WQMF

History
- First air date: September 8, 1998
- Former call signs: WQSH (1998–1999); WYBL (1999–2003); WJZL (2003–2005)
- Call sign meaning: "The Fox" (former brand)

Technical information
- Licensing authority: FCC
- Facility ID: 37753
- Class: A
- ERP: 4,100 watts
- HAAT: 114 meters (374 ft)
- Transmitter coordinates: 38°17′2.00″N 85°54′17.00″W

Links
- Public license information: Public file; LMS
- Webcast: Listen live (via iHeartRadio); Listen live (HD2)
- Website: real931.iheart.com

WTFX-FM (93.1 FM, "Real 93.1") is a commercial mainstream urban radio station licensed to Clarksville, Indiana, serving the Louisville metropolitan area. Owned by iHeartMedia, WTFX has studios located in Louisville, while the station transmitter resides in New Albany, Indiana.

Besides a standard analog transmission, WTFX-FM broadcasts over two HD Radio channels, and is available online via iHeartRadio.

== History ==
93.1 FM signed on in October 1998, first with a loop of songs from "Schoolhouse Rock", and then, on October 12, officially signed on with a Modern AC format as "She 93.1" with the WQSH call letters. In September 1999, "She" moved to 98.9 FM, with 93.1 flipping to country as "The Bull", WYBL. In May 2003, WYBL flipped to smooth jazz as WJZL. In September 2005, 93.1 FM became the home of active rock-formatted WTFX, as their former frequency (100.5 FM) flipped to adult hits as "Louie FM."

WTFX served as the local affiliate for Rover's Morning Glory, Skratch 'N Sniff, and The Side Show Countdown with Nikki Sixx.

On May 11, 2016, at 10 a.m., following Rover's Morning Glory, WTFX began stunting with a looped message redirecting listeners to sister station WQMF, which adopted some of WTFX's music and airstaff. The "Fox" active rock format moved to WQMF-HD2. At 5 p.m. that day, WTFX flipped to urban, branded as "93.1 The Beat", launching with 10,000 songs in a row. The first song on "The Beat" was "IDFWU" by Big Sean, followed by "Exchange" by Louisville native Bryson Tiller. The station will become the Louisville affiliate for The Breakfast Club.

On March 16, 2018, WTFX rebranded as "Real 93.1".
