= WGHL =

Radio station in Shepherdsville, Kentucky

- Shepherdsville, Kentucky; United States
- Broadcast area: Louisville metropolitan area
- Frequency: 105.1 MHz
- Branding: ALT 105.1

Programming
- Format: Alternative rock
- Affiliations: Compass Media Networks; Premiere Networks

Ownership
- Owner: Connoisseur Media; (Alpha Media Licensee LLC)
- Sister stations: WDJX, WGZB-FM, WMJM, WXMA

History
- First air date: 1992; 34 years ago (as WEHR)
- Former call signs: WZQE (1991–1992, CP); WEHR (1992–1996); WXLN-FM (1996–2000); WLXO (2/2000-3/2000); WLRS (2000–2013); WESI (2013–2014)
- Call sign meaning: Greatest Hits Louisville (former format)

Technical information
- Licensing authority: FCC
- Facility ID: 51074
- Class: A
- ERP: 1,900 watts
- HAAT: 180 meters (590 ft)
- Transmitter coordinates: 38.082°N 85.785°W

Links
- Public license information: Public file; LMS
- Webcast: Listen live
- Website: www.alt1051.com

WGHL (105.1 MHz) is a commercial FM radio station licensed to Shepherdsville, Kentucky, and broadcasting to the Louisville metropolitan area. It airs an alternative rock radio format and it is owned by Connoisseur Media. WGHL's studios are on Shelbyville Road in Downtown Louisville.

WGHL has an effective radiated power (ERP) of 1,900 watts. The transmitter tower is on Top Hill Road in the Jefferson Memorial Forest in Fairdale.

== History ==
The station signed on the air in 1993 as WEHR, with a hot adult contemporary format. After being off the air for two months, and being sold to new owners, WEHR flipped to Christian contemporary music as WXLN in June 1996. In February 2000, after being purchased by Blue Chip Broadcasting, and a brief stunt of a loop of "I Am the Walrus" by The Beatles, the station switched to active rock as "LRS 105", WLRS. This call sign was formerly found on 102.3 FM, now WXMA, from 1964 until 1999. On July 15, 2009, WLRS changed formats to hot talk and featured Mancow's Morning Madhouse radio show in morning drive time.

On November 1, 2012, WLRS dropped its hot talk format and began playing Christmas music. It was branded as "Christmas 105.1". On Christmas Eve 2012, WLRS flipped to a soft adult contemporary and oldies format. On January 30, 2013, WLRS changed its call letters to WESI, calling itself "Easy Rock 105.1".

On October 13, 2014, WESI flipped to classic hits as The New 105.1 GHL-FM, Louisville's Greatest Hits. The call sign was changed to WGHL (for Greatest Hits Louisville) on October 16, 2014.

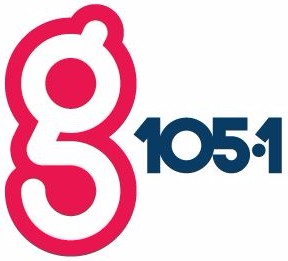
Logo as "G105.1"

On January 30, 2015, WGHL changed formats again. This time it flipped to classic hip hop, branded as "Old School 105.1". On September 6, 2016, WGHL rebranded as "G105.1". On August 31, 2018, WGHL changed its format to alternative rock, branded as "Alt 105.1".
