= WXMA =

Radio station in Louisville, Kentucky

- Louisville, Kentucky; United States
- Broadcast area: Louisville metropolitan area
- Frequency: 102.3 MHz
- Branding: 102.3 The Rose

Programming
- Format: Adult contemporary
- Affiliations: Premiere Networks

Ownership
- Owner: Connoisseur Media; (Alpha Media Licensee LLC Debtor in Possession)
- Sister stations: WDJX, WGHL, WGZB-FM, WMJM

History
- First air date: October 1964
- Former call signs: WLRS (1964–2000); WULV (2000–2002)
- Call sign meaning: Former "Max" branding

Technical information
- Licensing authority: FCC
- Facility ID: 37236
- Class: A
- ERP: 6,000 watts
- HAAT: 87 meters (285 ft)
- Transmitter coordinates: 38°14′37″N 85°45′34″W

Links
- Public license information: Public file; LMS
- Webcast: Listen live; Listen live (via iHeartRadio)
- Website: 1023therose.com

WXMA (102.3 FM) is a commercial radio station licensed to Louisville, Kentucky, United States. It is owned by Connoisseur Media and broadcasts an adult contemporary format known as "102.3 The Rose". The studios and offices are located on South 4th Street in Downtown Louisville.

WXMA's transmitter is sited atop The 800 Apartments building, a few blocks from the studios.

== History ==
=== Louisville Radio School ===
102.3 FM signed on the air in October 1964. It was a stand-alone FM station for the Louisville Radio School, hence the call sign WLRS. It was used as a training ground for the school's broadcast students in its early years and had a studio at the school on 1701 S. 3rd Street in Louisville.

In the late 1960s, station owner Clarance Henson entered into an agreement to sell WLRS to crosstown AM Top 40 station WAKY. But the deal fell apart when WAKY did not meet the six-month deadline to complete the transaction. By 1970, WLRS was noted as being one of only nine stand-alone FMs in the state of Kentucky.

=== Louisa Henson and Lee Masters ===
In 1974, under the aegis of Henson Broadcasting, Henson's daughter Louisa Henson became more involved in the family station. Under her control, WLRS aired an album-oriented rock (AOR) format. The playlist of The Beatles, The Rolling Stones, The Who and Creedence Clearwater Revival brought WLRS top ratings in 1978 even though the station was only had an effective radiated power of 3,000 watts. Some said it marked the first time in the nation an FM rock station had placed first in an Arbitron ratings survey, a trend that would continue as the era of FM dominance got under way.

The WLRS program director during the 1970s and early 80s was Jarl Mohn, known then by the air name of Lee Masters. Masters and Bob Pittman went on to become the founders of the MTV cable channel.

=== Popular DJs ===
Henson Broadcasting later hired high-spirited disc jockeys Ron Clay and Terry Meiners to host the wake-up show. In 1983, both were hired away by competitor 95.7 WQMF after a brief legal dispute. The duo's show "Morning Sickness" was broadcast from the 800 Building on weekdays in AM drive time. When the pair left, a judge ruled that the name of the show and their sketches would remain WLRS's intellectual property.

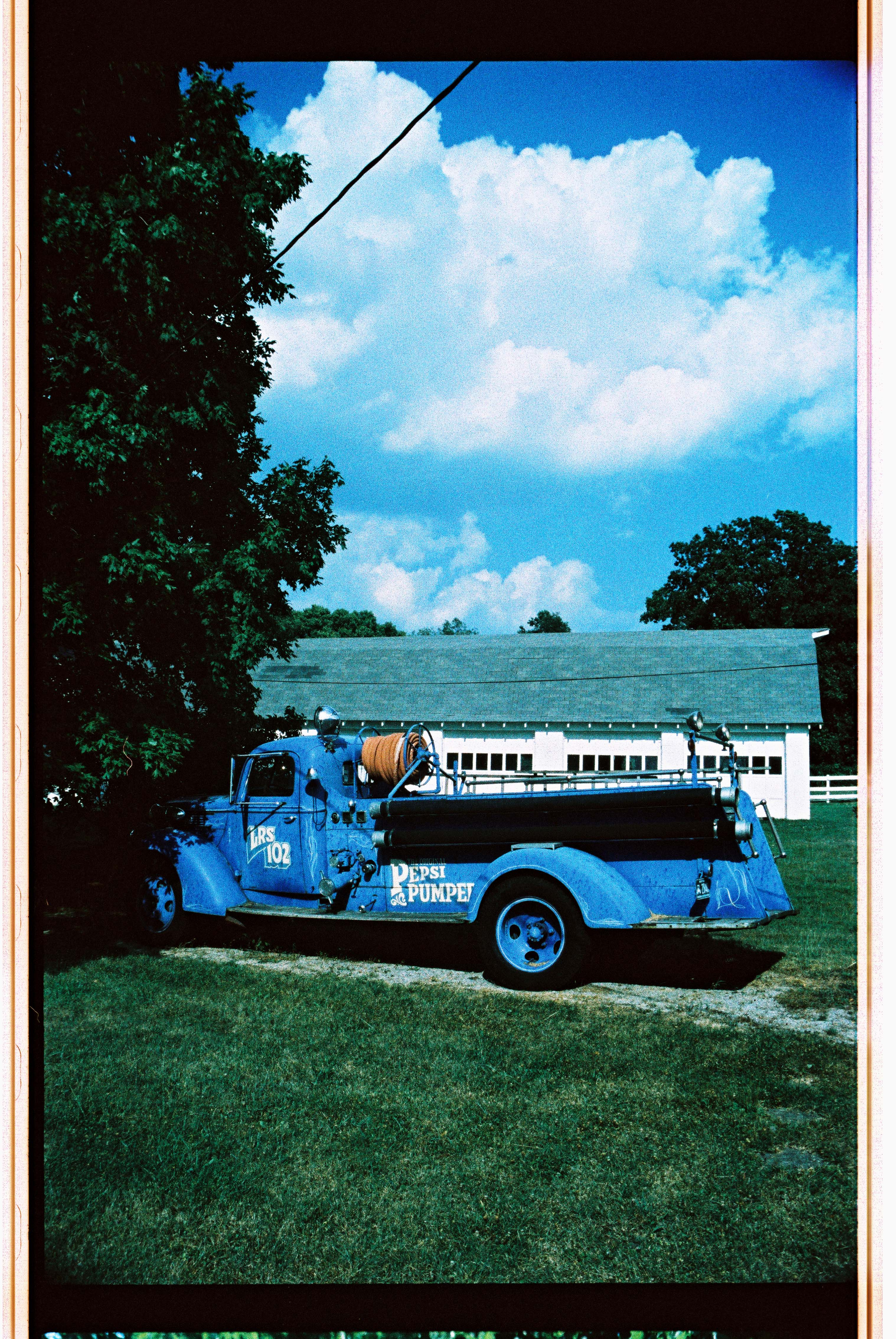
An LRS 102 promotional vehicle

WLRS began using a "walrus" as the station mascot in the 1970s. The spelling of walrus roughly translated to the station's call letters. WLRS hired local artists Danny Messex and Victor Troutman Jr. to make the walrus art. Under the helm of manager Louisa Henson, the station began a series of memorable promotions that lasted over a decade. In 1981, DJ Terry Meiners memorably promoted "sex with Mick Jagger" during the Rolling Stones' only regional appearance in a WLRS-promoted concert.

For ten years, the station conducted the Christmas toy drive, "Bridge the Gap." It distributed as many as 50,000 toys to needy children each year. WLRS would broadcast from Louisville's Phoenix Hill Tavern for the event. Louisa Henson continued charity work after the station folded, and spun Bridge the Gap off as a nonprofit.

=== Mixing AOR and Top 40 ===
By 1981, WLRS was beaten by rival album rock station 95.7 WQMF in Arbitron. It signaled a decline for WLRS's ratings. In 1984, the station switched to a hybrid format of album rock hits and Top 40/CHR songs as "The Flamethrowing LRS 102". At the same time, the station began adding normal pop artists like Michael Jackson, Phil Collins, Whitney Houston and Madonna to its playlist while still leaning toward rock music, as well as additional CHR-leaning programming such as Casey Kasem's American Top 40 (replacing its previous affiliate WJYL). The format was designed to fill the void left when WKJJ abandoned Top 40 for adult contemporary in 1982 and WJYL dropped Top 40 for urban contemporary in 1984.

Eventually, WKJJ switched back to CHR as WDJX the following year in August 1985, and both WLRS and WDJX briefly battled each other for the next few years. WDJX won the mainstream battle when WLRS returned to its original album rock format in 1986. The station later flipped back to Top 40/CHR in 1988 before being sold to Toney Brooks' One Broadcasting.

=== Adult Contemporary ===
On December 27, 1990, at 2 a.m., WLRS began stunting with Macintosh's Talking Moose counting down from 70,000 to 1. On January 1, 1991, at approximately 9:27 a.m., WLRS flipped to adult contemporary music as "Mix 102". The first song on "Mix" was "This Is It" by Kenny Loggins. As was done in a number of AC stations at the time (including WWMX in Baltimore and WMXC in Charlotte), it complemented its branding with the call letter slogan "WMIX" while maintaining WLRS as the hourly legal call letters.

However, the "WMIX" branding was dropped by June 1991 due to trademark concerns. Withers Broadcasting, which owns two actual WMIX stations in Mount Vernon, Illinois, (WMIX AM and WMIX-FM), registered the "WMIX" branding as an official trademark.

The format gained ratings momentum over the next 18 months, and WLRS had beaten long time adult contemporary ratings leader WVEZ with 25-54 adults in the Summer 1992 Arbitron survey.

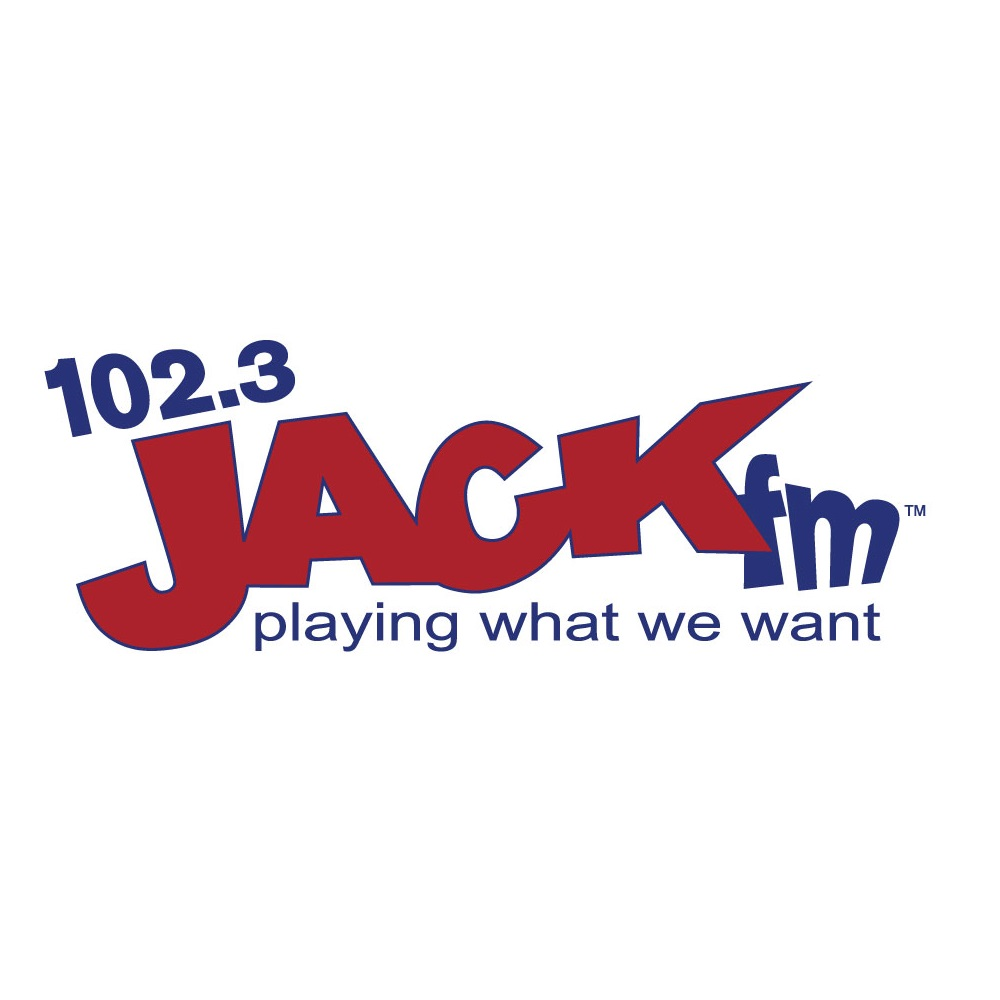
Logo as 102.3 Jack FM

=== Alternative Rock ===
On May 18, 1997, at 6 p.m., after playing "The Last Song" by Edward Bear, WLRS began stunting with a loop of "I Am the Walrus" by The Beatles, as well as promotions for other Louisville radio stations and teaser formats. One of the teaser formats was country as "Hot Country 102, The Bull".

On May 26, at 1:02 p.m., WLRS switched to alternative rock as "LRS 102.3". The first song on "LRS" was "Spoonman" by Soundgarden. The alternative format lasted two years.

=== Soft AC, Normal AC, Hot AC, Adult Hits ===
On July 30, 1999, at 3 p.m., WLRS flipped to soft adult contemporary as "Love 102.3", and changed call letters to WULV. (The WLRS call letters would be resurrected on 105.1 FM in February 2000, with that station featuring an active rock format.) On May 17, 2002, WULV switched to Hot AC as "102.3 The Max", WXMA.

On August 31, 2017, at noon, WXMA changed to adult hits, branded as "102.3 Jack FM". It used the national JACK FM syndicated feed with no DJs. The "voice of Jack" made sarcastic quips and ironic remarks between songs.

On August 30, 2022, at noon, WXMA flipped back to Soft AC, branded as "102.3 The Rose". By September 2 2025, WXMA evolved to mainstream AC.
