= Halfway, Maryland =

- Census-designated place
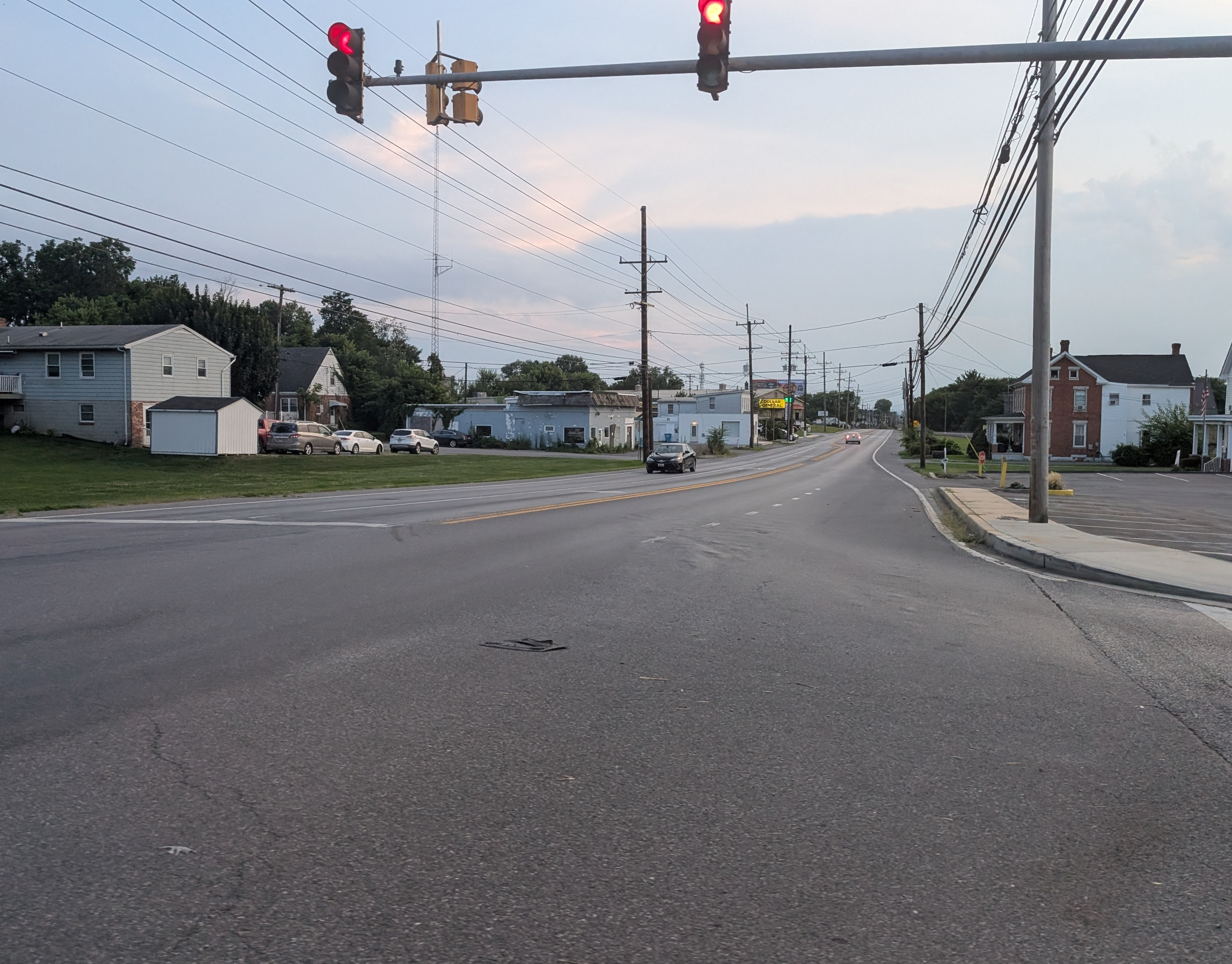
- US 11 southbound through Halfway
- Nickname: Halfway
- Interactive map of Halfway, Maryland
- Coordinates: 39°36′59″N 77°45′56″W
- Country: United States
- State: Maryland
- County: Washington

Area
  - Census-designated place: 4.55 sq mi (11.78 km^{2})
  - Land: 4.55 sq mi (11.78 km^{2})
  - Water: 0 sq mi (0.00 km^{2})
- Elevation: 558 ft (170 m)

Population (2020)
  - Census-designated place: 11,896
  - Density: 2,615/sq mi (1,009.6/km^{2})
  - Metro: 257,619
- Time zone: UTC−5 (EST)
  - Summer (DST): UTC−4 (EDT)
- Zip code: 21740-21749
- FIPS code: 24-36125
- GNIS feature ID: 2389890

Halfway is a census-designated place (CDP) in Washington County, Maryland, United States. The population was 11,896 at the 2020 census. It is named due to its location, which is halfway between Hagerstown and Williamsport. Halfway is a major suburb in the Hagerstown-Martinsburg, MD-WV, Metropolitan Statistical Area.

== Geography ==
According to the United States Census Bureau, the CDP has a total area of 4.7 square miles (12 km^{2}), all land.

== Demographics ==
Historical population
| Census | Pop. | Note | %± |
|---|---|---|---|
| 2020 | 11,896 | | — |
U.S. Decennial Census

=== 2020 census ===
As of the 2020 census, the median age was 42.8 years. 21.5% of residents were under the age of 18 and 22.0% of residents were 65 years of age or older. For every 100 females there were 93.8 males, and for every 100 females age 18 and over there were 90.3 males age 18 and over.

100.0% of residents lived in urban areas, while 0.0% lived in rural areas.

There were 4,851 households in Halfway, of which 27.4% had children under the age of 18 living in them. Of all households, 44.3% were married-couple households, 18.0% were households with a male householder and no spouse or partner present, and 30.2% were households with a female householder and no spouse or partner present. About 31.5% of all households were made up of individuals and 18.1% had someone living alone who was 65 years of age or older.

There were 5,127 housing units, of which 5.4% were vacant. The homeowner vacancy rate was 1.2% and the rental vacancy rate was 7.5%.

Racial composition as of the 2020 census
| Race | Number | Percent |
|---|---|---|
| White | 9,656 | 81.2% |
| Black or African American | 592 | 5.0% |
| American Indian and Alaska Native | 39 | 0.3% |
| Asian | 218 | 1.8% |
| Native Hawaiian and Other Pacific Islander | 3 | 0.0% |
| Some other race | 605 | 5.1% |
| Two or more races | 783 | 6.6% |
| Hispanic or Latino (of any race) | 1,174 | 9.9% |

=== 2010 census ===
Racial composition as of the 2010 census
| Race | Number | Percent |
| Total | 10,701 | 100 |
| White | 9,708 | 90 |
| African American | 398 | 3 |
| Hispanic | 349 | 3 |
| Two or More Races | 245 | 2 |
| Asian | 190 | 1 |
| Other | 137 | 1 |

=== 2000 census ===
As of the census of 2000, there were 10,065 people, 4,275 households, and 2,851 families residing in the CDP. The population density was 2,147.6 inhabitants per square mile (829.2/km^{2}). There were 4,424 housing units at an average density of 944.0 per square mile (364.5/km^{2}). The racial makeup of the CDP was 95.47% White, 2.13% African American, 0.09% Native American, 0.97% Asian, 0.12% Pacific Islander, 0.24% from other races, and 0.98% from two or more races. Hispanic or Latino of any race were 1.09% of the population.

There were 4,275 households, out of which 26.9% had children under the age of 18 living with them, 53.2% were married couples living together, 10.4% had a female householder with no husband present, and 33.3% were non-families. 29.1% of all households were made up of individuals, and 16.1% had someone living alone who was 65 years of age or older. The average household size was 2.32 and the average family size was 2.85.

In the CDP, the population was spread out, with 22.2% under the age of 18, 5.9% from 18 to 24, 26.5% from 25 to 44, 23.5% from 45 to 64, and 21.9% who were 65 years of age or older. The median age was 42 years. For every 100 females, there were 86.5 males. For every 100 females, age 18 and over, there were 81.6 males.

The median income for a household in the CDP was $41,892, and the median income for a family was $51,143. Males had a median income of $36,847 versus $26,008 for females. The per capita income for the CDP was $21,518. About 4.3% of families and 5.6% of the population were below the poverty line, including 6.7% of those under age 18 and 5.0% of those age 65 or over.
