= WDJX =

Radio station in Louisville, Kentucky

- Louisville, Kentucky; United States
- Broadcast area: Louisville
- Frequency: 99.7 MHz
- Branding: 99-7 DJX

Programming
- Language: English
- Format: Contemporary hit radio

Ownership
- Owner: Connoisseur Media; (Alpha Media Licensee LLC)
- Sister stations: WGHL; WGZB-FM; WMJM; WXMA

History
- First air date: August 1962
- Former call signs: WKLO-FM (1962–1971); WCSN (1971–1979); WKJJ-FM (1979–1985)

Technical information
- Licensing authority: FCC
- Facility ID: 55498
- Class: B
- ERP: 24,000 watts
- HAAT: 218 meters (715 ft)
- Transmitter coordinates: 38°21′53″N 85°50′18″W

Links
- Public license information: Public file; LMS
- Webcast: Listen Live
- Website: wdjx.com

WDJX (99.7 FM) is a top 40 (CHR)-formatted radio station located in Louisville, Kentucky. The station has an effective radiated power (ERP) of 24 kW. The station's studios are located in East Louisville and the transmitter site is in New Albany, Indiana. WDJX is owned by Connoisseur Media.

== Station history ==
WKLO-FM signed on in August 1962 as the FM sister to WKLO (1080 AM). Initially, the station simulcast much of WKLO's Top 40 format, breaking off after 6 p.m. to air classical music and showtunes, but eventually segued into a full-time simulcast by the end of the 1960s. When the Federal Communications Commission (FCC) banned full-time AM-FM simulcasts in the late 1960s, WKLO-FM switched to an automated Top 40 format. In the early 1970s, WKLO-FM became WCSN with an automated beautiful music/easy listening format.

In 1979, WCSN ("Sunshine Melodies") abruptly dropped its automated beautiful music/easy listening format for a rock-leaning Top 40 format as WKJJ, with the first song in the new format as "Renegade" by Styx. Initially, the station was known as "JJ-100", but was quickly changed to "KJ-100" days after signing-on. Several months later, sister AM WKLO was changed to WKJJ as both stations pioneered a then-unique concept of "lateral replays" where a song would air on the FM and the same song would air several minutes later on the AM. This concept was done in order to get around FCC rules that were still in place at the time.

In 1981, sister WKJJ dropped the lateral replay concept as the format was changed to country as WCII. One year later, WKJJ-FM changed to adult contemporary as "Magic 100". This move left parts of the Louisville market without a Top 40/CHR station for roughly a year (in the meantime, WAKY continued its successful Top 40 format, while WSAC and its sister FM station in nearby Fort Knox had aired a Top 40 and adult contemporary mix for parts of the Louisville market). In addition, legendary AOR leader WLRS and adult contemporary turned Top 40/CHR WJYL would attempt to fill the hole for CHR in the Louisville market, and WRKA in nearby Lyndon took its short-lived Top 40 format for the Louisville market throughout 1982 and 1983 before returning to its fully operated adult contemporary format by 1984.

On August 29, 1985, "Magic 100" stunted by playing Christmas carols for about an hour. When the stunt ended, WDJX signed on as a CHR station as 99 DJX. The first song WDJX played was "Money for Nothing" by Dire Straits.

In 1994, Regent Communications (now Townsquare Media), owner of both WDJX-FM and WDJX, changed its relationship with WHKW from a LMA to a sales marketing agreement.
