= WGZB-FM =

Radio station in Lanesville, Indiana

Lanesville, Indiana; United States
- Broadcast area: Louisville-Jefferson County, KY-IN MSA
- Frequency: 96.5 MHz
- Branding: B96.5

Programming
- Format: Mainstream urban

Ownership
- Owner: Connoisseur Media; (Alpha Media Licensee LLC Debtor in Possession)
- Sister stations: WDJX, WGHL, WMJM, WXMA

History
- First air date: April 15, 1990
- Former call signs: WDJW (1988–1989)

Technical information
- Licensing authority: FCC
- Facility ID: 53202
- Class: A
- ERP: 1,600 watts
- HAAT: 194.4 meters (638 feet)
- Transmitter coordinates: 38°10′25″N 85°54′50″W

Links
- Public license information: Public file; LMS
- Webcast: Listen Live
- Website: hiphopb965.com

WGZB-FM (96.5 MHz, "B96.5") is a mainstream urban radio station in Louisville, Kentucky. Its city of license is Lanesville, Indiana, and its radio tower is located near Elizabeth, Indiana near the Ohio River, while its studios are located in downtown Louisville. The station is owned by Connoisseur Media.

== Station history ==
WGZB-FM signed on April 15, 1990, with its present Urban Contemporary format under the "B-96.5" name, with offices and studios in the Cosmopolitan Building at Third and Kentucky. The original general manager was Managing Partner Rodney Burbridge. In its first few years on the air, the station was licensed to Corydon, Indiana and was handicapped with a signal that covered only half of Louisville's metro. Nevertheless, WGZB soon became the choice for Louisville's African American population (with approx. 200,000 African-Americans in the radio market as of Fall 2013) and was the final nail in the coffin for 1350 AM WLOU's long-running Urban format (1951–1995). Earlier attempts at Urban Contemporary/Urban Adult programming in the market include "rimshot" FM Urban WJYL (1984–89) and WDGS (1985–87).

WGZB was notable in that it tied WLOU for top Louisville Urban radio station after only six weeks on the air, according to the Spring 1990 Arbitron radio ratings. In 1994, WGZB added Urban Adult Contemporary WLSY-FM (now WMJM) to its group of stations, giving the combination broader demographic reach by targeting the age 30+ audience, while WGZB targeted the age 12-35 group. Both stations enjoy large "crossover" (Black+White+Hispanic+Asian+Native) audiences, along with their Hot Contemporary Hit Radio ("top 40") sister station, WDJX-FM.

In 2004, WGZB's license was changed from Corydon to Lanesville so that the tower could be moved closer to Louisville and raised taller, eliminating much of the signal problems that the station had due to the low ERP.

WGZB carries the syndicated Russ Parr Morning Show, though it did at one time carry Doug Banks until the station was purchased by Radio One. In 2007, Main Line Broadcasting purchased Radio One's Louisville properties, which included WGZB-FM. In one of the Fall 2013 monthly Arbitron (now NielsenAudio) ratings reports, WGZB ranked #1 in the Louisville radio market, with sisters WDJX and WMJM as #4 and #5 respectfully (out of 32 stations in the Louisville market, listeners age 10+).
