= Watterson Park, Kentucky =

- City
- Location of Watterson Park in Jefferson County, Kentucky

- Location within the state of Kentucky Watterson Park (the United States)
- Coordinates: 38°11′10″N 85°40′51″W
- Country: United States
- State: Kentucky
- County: Jefferson

Area
  - Total: 1.44 sq mi (3.74 km^{2})
  - Land: 1.44 sq mi (3.73 km^{2})
  - Water: 0.0039 sq mi (0.01 km^{2})
- Elevation: 479 ft (146 m)

Population (2020)
  - Total: 1,004
  - Density: 697.4/sq mi (269.27/km^{2})
- Time zone: UTC-5 (Eastern (EST))
  - Summer (DST): UTC-4 (EDT)
- ZIP Code: 40218
- FIPS code: 21-80913
- GNIS feature ID: 2405689
- Website: wattersonparkky.com

Watterson Park is a home rule-class city in Jefferson County, Kentucky, United States. As of the 2020 census, Watterson Park had a population of 1,004.

== Geography ==
Watterson Park is located in central Jefferson County. Interstate 264 runs just north of the city limits, while Newburg Road forms the northeast border and Poplar Level Road (Kentucky Route 864) forms parts of the southwest border. Downtown Louisville is 7 miles (11 km) to the northwest. Watterson Park is bordered to the east by West Buechel, and Poplar Hills touches a small length of the southwest boundary.

According to the United States Census Bureau, Watterson Park has a total area of 1.4 square miles (3.7 km^{2}), of which 1.9 acres (7,888 m^{2}), or 0.21%, are water.

== Demographics ==
Historical population
Census	Pop.	Note	%±
1990	1,542		—
2000	953		−38.2%
2010	976		2.4%
2020	1,004		2.9%
U.S. Decennial Census

At the 2000 census there were 953 people in 504 households, including 252 families, in the city. The population density was 675.9 inhabitants per square mile (261.0/km^{2}). There were 538 housing units at an average density of 381.6 per square mile (147.3/km^{2}). The racial makeup of the city was 78.38% White, 16.68% African American, 0.42% Native American, 1.47% Asian, 0.42% from other races, and 2.62% from two or more races. Hispanic or Latino of any race were 0.63%.

Watterson Park's largest racial or ethnic groups as of the 2020 Census were White (44.5%) followed by Black (29.7%) and Hispanic (20.8%).

Of the 504 households 16.5% had children under the age of 18 living with them, 32.9% were married couples living together, 10.9% had a female householder with no husband present, and 50.0% were non-families. 44.0% of households were one person and 17.7% were one person aged 65 or older. The average household size was 1.89 and the average family size was 2.55.

The age distribution was 14.8% under the age of 18, 7.6% from 18 to 24, 32.4% from 25 to 44, 24.7% from 45 to 64, and 20.6% 65 or older. The median age was 42 years. For every 100 females, there were 102.3 males. For every 100 females age 18 and over, there were 96.1 males.

The median household income was $25,417 and the median family income was $34,917. Males had a median income of $30,500 versus $22,759 for females. The per capita income for the city was $18,933. About 7.5% of families and 14.0% of the population were below the poverty line, including 13.7% of those under age 18 and 9.7% of those age 65 or over.
