= KFRO (AM) =

Simulcast with KFRO-FM, Cuney, TX
- Longview, Texas; United States
- Broadcast area: Tyler–Longview
- Frequency: 1370 kHz (C-QUAM AM stereo)
- Branding: 99.7 & 94.1 KFRO

Programming
- Format: Classic hits

Ownership
- Owner: (RCA Broadcasting, LLC)
- Sister stations: KFRO-FM

History
- First air date: February 5, 1935
- Call sign meaning: "Keep Forever Rolling On"

Technical information
- Licensing authority: FCC
- Facility ID: 70455
- Class: D
- Power: 1,000 watts (day); 100 watts (night)
- Transmitter coordinates: 32°30′7″N 94°42′12″W
- Translator: 94.1 K231DK (Longview)

Links
- Public license information: Public file; LMS
- Webcast: Listen live
- Website: kfroradio.com

KFRO (1370 AM) is a commercial radio station licensed to Longview, Texas, United States, serving the Tyler–Longview area. Owned by RCA Broadcasting, LLC., it simulcasts a classic hits format with KFRO-FM (99.7), branded as "99.7 and 94.1 KFRO".

The KFRO towers are 177 feet tall. The current KFRO transmitter building was built in 2003. KFRO signed on in 1935 with a 100-watt homemade transmitter. In 1935 KFRO increased its power to 250 watts with a Western Electric transmitter. In 1941 power was increased to 1,000 watts, and a new RCA BTA-1D was installed; it stayed in service until 1983, when it was replaced by a Rockwell Collins 820-D2. The Rockwell Collins transmitter was made to run C-QUAM AM stereo, which made KFRO the first AM stereo station in East Texas. The Collins-Rockwell was replaced in 2003 with a used 1978 Harris MW-1 solid state. In June 2019, a C-QUAM AM stereo exciter was reinstalled at the station.

== History ==
James R. Curtis received a license in 1924 to operate KFRO on 1220 kilohertz in Ft. Worth, Texas. However, financial problems forced Curtis to abandon the plans for the Ft. Worth station and later revive the KFRO license on 1370 kHz in Longview. According to the 60th anniversary of KFRO (Longview News Journal Supplement), Rogers Lacy, maternal uncle of James R. Curtis, offered to fund $5000 for the equipment needed to get KFRO on the air. Lacy wanted to build Longview into a city, and knew that radio would do exactly that. Mr. Curtis packed his small family and his law practice and moved to Longview.

On October 30, 1933, Voice of Longview received a construction permit to build a 100-watt radio station on 1370 kHz in Longview. The location was listed as a generic "local hotel" for both transmitter and studios (as that was what the larger market stations were doing, renting space in hotels).

The call letters KFRO stand for "Keep Forever Rolling On".

KFRO, "The Voice of Longview" signed on the air on February 6, 1935, on 1370 kilohertz with a power of 100 watts daytime by owner J.R. Curtis. The original studio building and transmitter for KFRO were at the northwest corner of S. Green Street (then known as Texas State Highway 149) and Radio Street on the southern edge of town. The original KFRO studio building still exists as of 2020 and is a private residence.

In 1935 KFRO tried to move its frequency to 1210, but was stopped after an experimental period on 1210.

In 1935 First Baptist Church of Longview first started to broadcast its services on KFRO. This made the First Baptist Church Broadcast the third longest-running program in broadcasting (The Grand Ole Opry (November 28, 1925) on WSM is longest-running show and Music and the Spoken Word (July 15, 1929) on KSL is the second longest). First Baptist ceased the broadcasts after 73 years.

On October 7, 1936, KFRO powered up from 100 watts to 250 watts from the location on Radio Street in South Longview.

For two years (until 1937), Rogers Lacy (legendary oil wildcatter in Longview) was partners with J.R. Curtis. On July 24, 1937, James R. Curtis became full owner of "The Voice Of Longview".

On March 18, 1937, KFRO covered the New London School explosion, in which approximately 300 students and teachers were killed in the deadliest school building disaster in US history. Ironically, the victims of the explosion were taken to the Jacksonville, Texas hospital. The Jacksonville Hospital later became the headquarters of Waller Broadcasting, the one time owners of KFRO.

In 1937, KFRO's studios moved to suite 620 in the Glover-Crim Building Suite 411 in downtown Longview.

In 1938, Jerry Doggett, LA Dodgers announcer, got his start on KFRO. He left KFRO in 1941 to go to WRR in Dallas.

In 1939 KFRO's transmitter moved to its current site, the property behind the J.R. Curtis mansion at 2118 East Marshall Avenue (Hwy 80). At the new transmitter site there were three towers erected, which allowed KFRO to be a full-time station, now on 1340 kHz. KFRO's new transmitter was an RCABTA-1D. At that time KFRO was an RCA turn-key station. KFRO runs 1 kilowatt with one tower daytime, and 1 kilowatt three-tower directional at night.

In 1940 Grant Turner of Baird, Texas joined the KFRO air staff. Turner was known as the "Voice of the Grand Ole Opry. In 1981 Turner was inducted into the Country Music Hall of Fame. Turner also sang, and had several duet albums with Helen Carter on the Tennessee and Republic labels. He also performed on the Grand Ole Opry.

In 1947, KFRO moved into the former home of the Hurst Eye, Ear, Nose, and Throat Hospital on Methvin Street in downtown Longview and renamed it the Curtis Building. The new studios were very plush, with a grand piano, harp, and room for a full band. The Hurst Hospital building was built in 1919 by Dr. V.R. Hurst and was located on Methvin Street, between the U.S. Post Office and the Hilton Hotel.

In 1941, implementing the North American Regional Broadcasting Agreement, the U.S. Federal Communications Commission shifted all of the frequencies above 710 kilohertz to make room for more stations, and more clear-channel frequencies. KFRO was moved from 1340 kHz back to its original frequency of 1370 kHz.

In 1953, The East Texas Hillbilly Jamboree debuted on KFRO. The show opened at the Rita Theatre starring Claude King and the Roadrunners, and some 30 other entertainers. The East Texas Hillbilly Jamboree was started to capitalize on the popularity of the WSM Grand Ole Opry in Nashville, and the KWKH Louisiana Hayride in Shreveport. With the close proximity of Longview to Shreveport KFRO was hoping to siphon some of the Louisiana Hayride's talent and audience. But due to KFRO's limited signal the show failed. WSM and KWKH had national audiences due to the 50,000-watt signals.

In the 1980s, Curtis moved KFRO to new facilities at 481 East Loop 281 near N. Fourth St. in northeast Longview.

The Curtis Building and the former Hilton Hotel were torn down in the early 1990s, and the site is now occupied by Heritage Plaza.

In the mid-1980s J.R. Curtis Jr. bought 95.3 KNIF Gilmer, on December 5, 1986, 95.3 became KAEZ, and moved the studios to Longview. 95.3 then became KLSQ on September 17, 1990. On March 1, 1993, 95.3 was rebranded as KFRO-FM, and the format changed to oldies (1950s and 1960s rock and roll and pop), and was called "The Frog". On December 7, 1998, 95.3 became KCGL, and then back to 95.3 KFRO-FM February 15, 1999. 95.3 has been just about every format in the book, including Beautiful Music, Easy Listening, Country, Top-40, Oldies, Spanish, Smooth Jazz, Soft Rock, and now a Top-40 mix variety format. The most successful time in 95.3's history was the oldies era when the station was known as "The Frog".

Throughout KFRO's history it has been every network affiliation (except NBC/NBC Red). It has been Mutual, TSN, Keystone, ABC/NBC Blue, CBS, CNN, ESPN, and Fox. KFRO was last a Fox News affiliate. Until May 2013 KFRO was an affiliate of the Moody Bible Institute, but has since dropped the service in favor of Fox Sports Radio.

KFRO remained in the Curtis family for 63 years until the late J.R. Curtis Jr. sold the station in 1998.

== Sunburst years ==
On June 15, 1998, the KFRO stations were bought by Sunburst, who moved KYKX into the KFRO building on the Loop. The Sunburst group included 105.7 KYKX Longview, 104.1 KKUS Tyler, 100.7 KPXI Overton, 1370 KFRO Longview, and 95.3 KFRO-FM Gilmer. At that point "Voice of Longview" Broadcasting ceased to exist. A few months after the sale, J.R. Curtis Jr. died in a motorcycle accident. A few months after that, J.R. Curtis, senior, founder of KFRO, died.

== Waller years ==
On October 18, 2000, KFRO, KFRO-FM, KKUS, and KYKX were sold to Waller Media of Jacksonville. Sunburst's KPXI was sold to Salem, and lowered power so that they could raise the power on their Dallas station 100.7 KWRD-FM. Under Waller's ownership KFRO's format changed many times. From Urban AC, to ESPN, to Music Of Your Life (standards), Oldies, and talk. The Waller group of stations included 1370 KFRO Longview, 95.3 KFRO-FM Gilmer, 105.7 KYKX Longview, 104.1 KKUS Tyler, 106.5 KOOI Jacksonville, 1400 KEBE Jacksonville, 96.7 KOYE Frankston, and 102.3 KLJT Jacksonville. In 2004 Waller leased and bought 103.1 KDVE and 100.3 KXAL.

== Access.1/East Texas Radio Group years ==
On January 7, 2005, KFRO was purchased by Access.1 (East Texas Radio Group), and became a tri-mulcast of Classic Country 104.1 KKUS, Tyler. Access.1 moved KFRO from its 20+ year home in the Curtis Building at 481 E Loop 281, to its current home at 4408 North US Highway 259 in Longview, where the audio loops through; KYKX is also in the building. KFRO was being run from a small six-channel mixer in the KKUS control room in Tyler, this ended with the simulcast of The Ranch.

On January 1, 2015, Access.1 entered into a three-year LMA with Alpha Media. Alpha Media will run KFRO, while Access.1 will retain ownership of the station. Alpha Media purchased KFRO's sister stations KYKX, KKUS, KOOI, and KOYE. Alpha also purchased the Access.1 stations in Shreveport, Louisiana.

November 30, 2015, Access.1 ceased to exist, and the last three remaining stations, KFRO, KCUL-FM, and KSYR, were folded into a new holding company, A.1 Investco LLC. A.1 Investco is controlled directly by Todd Boehly, the CEO of Guggenheim Capital. On March 1, 2016, Guggenheim filed with the FCC to transfer control from the former CEO of Guggenheim, Todd Boehly, to the new CEO, Kevin Gundersen.

== RCA Broadcasting ==
On November 1, 2016, RCA Broadcasting (owner of 1410 KZEY), and A.1 Invesco entered into an agreement to sell 1370 KFRO and its assets to RCA Broadcasting. The LMA with Alpha and Access.1 was canceled by both parties in February 2017. FCC approval was granted and the deal was consummated on February 3, 2017. Concurrently, Fox Sports programming ceased on 1370 KFRO.

On March 20, 2017, KFRO was taken silent due to transmitter damage caused by a lightning strike. On January 18, 2018, KFRO returned to the air. The station's programming is recorded talk.

On January 31, 2018, RCA Broadcasting filed a request to obtain a construction permit to build an FM translator for KFRO at 95.9 MHz, from tower 2 at the KFRO transmitter site on highway 80. The application was granted for the translator on June 11, 2018, and the frequency changed to 95.7 MHz, as K239CT. Effective November 18, 2022, the translator moved to 94.1 MHz, as K231DK.

On February 8, 2025, had a special presentation for the 90th anniversary of the first broadcast of KFRO. The presentation was held at the Gregg County Historical Museum. The KFRO historical archive was displayed along with a presentation of the full history of the station. KFRO is the first station in East Texas to celebrate its 90th anniversary.

== Programming ==
On February 6, 2022, at 8 pm, the 87th anniversary of KFRO's first broadcast, KFRO aired a live broadcast of "Galaxy Moonbeam Night Site", celebrating the 87 years of KFRO and highlighting the glory years of KFRO.

At 9 pm, immediately following Galaxy, owner Scott Rice, thanked all that had contributed to the station, and helped with the station's acquisition and equipment. Then opened the station in prayer.

== Translator ==
Broadcast translator for KFRO
Call sign	Frequency	City of license	FID	ERP (W)	HAAT	Class	FCC info	Notes
K231DK	94.1 FM	Longview, Texas	202806	250	48 m (157 ft)	D	LMS	First air date: October 18, 2022
