= KCUL =

KCUL may refer to:

- KDPM (FM), a radio station (92.3 FM) licensed to serve Marshall, Texas, United States, which held the call signs KCUL-FM from 1992 to 2020 and KCUL in 2020
- KPRO, a defunct radio station (1410 AM) formerly licensed to serve Marshall, Texas, which held the call sign KCUL from 2019 to 2020
- KAMM (AM), a radio station (1540 AM) formerly KCUL from 1949 to 1967 licensed to serve University Park, Texas
- the ICAO code for Carmi Municipal Airport, an airport in Carmi, Illinois
