= KFRO =

KFRO may refer to:

- KFRO (AM), a radio station (1370 AM) licensed to Longview, Texas, United States
- KFRO-FM, a radio station (99.7 FM) licensed to Cuney, Texas
- KELW, a radio station (95.3 FM) licensed to Gilmer, Texas, which held the call sign KFRO-FM from 1993 to 1998 and from 1999 to 2022
