= Grant Turner (radio host) =

American disc jockey (1912–1991)

- Born: Jessie Granderson Turner; May 17, 1912; Baird, Texas, US
- Died: October 19, 1991 (aged 79); Brentwood, Tennessee, US
- Years active: 1928–1991
- Known for: Radio host of the Grand Ole Opry (1945–1991)
- Spouse(s): Aubrey Faye Grose Hayes (m. 1934; div. 1956); Lorene Hughes (m. 1956)
- Awards: Country Disc Jockey Hall of Fame, 1975; Country Music Hall of Fame, 1981

Grant Turner (May 17, 1912 – October 19, 1991) was an American disc jockey known as the long time host of the Grand Ole Opry and on WSM AM radio in Nashville, Tennessee. In 1981, Turner was inducted into the Country Music Hall of Fame, the first announcer or disk jockey to achieve that honor.

== Early life ==
Born Jessie Granderson Turner in Baird, Texas, near Abilene, he was the son of a banker and the grandson of a rancher. In 1928 while in high school, Turner performed on KFYO-AM in Abilene and performed as Ike and His Guitar before becoming an announcer for the station that same year. After majoring in journalism in college and then worked in newspapers both in Texas and Louisiana during the 1930s, Turner returned to radio at KFRO-AM in Longview, Texas. By 1942, Turner left Texas for a radio position in Knoxville, Tennessee.

== Career at WSM ==
In 1944, Turner rode an all-night bus from Knoxville to Nashville to audition for WSM-AM. Joining the station on June 6 of that year, the same day as the Normandy landings during World War II, Turner first announced the early-morning programs of WSM-AM. A few months later, Turner joined George D. Hay and the staff of Saturday night announcers for the Grand Ole Opry. By the late 1940s, Turner reached the "big prize" (as he called it) when he hosted the R.J. Reynolds sponsored portion of the Opry on the NBC Radio Network. This show, the Prince Albert Show would have 10 million weekly listeners in over 170 radio stations by 1953. Turner would later host the Mr. DJ, USA radio program on WSM-AM that featured guest disk jockeys from around the United States. By the mid-1950s, Turner became the third announcer of Ernest Tubb's Midnite Jamboree, a position Turner would hold until 1977.

While at the Opry, Turner also hosted the pre-Opry Grand Ole Opry Warmup Show, spinning records and taking requests on the Opry Stage every Friday and Saturday night shows, first at the Ryman Auditorium in downtown Nashville, and later at the Grand Ole Opry House at Opryland USA northeast of Nashville after the new Opry House opened in March 1974 (The new Opry House is still in use near the now Opry Mills Mall following the park's closure and demolition between 1997 and 2000.). Turner performed this until the night before he died in Brentwood, Tennessee in October 1991.

== Music and other recording career ==
Outside of the Opry, Turner had a less than successful career as a recording artist. During 1951–52, Turner recorded four duets with Helen Carter for Tennessee and Republic Records. In 1964–65, Turner had four solo numbers with Chart Records (now part of Sony Music ). Turner also made spoken-word LP recordings, including one personal Opry memoir for CVS Records in 1980. That same year, Turner had an uncredited role as an Opry announcer in the Loretta Lynn biographical film Coal Miner's Daughter.

== Legacy ==
Known for his diction, ingratiating personality, and professionalism, Turner was among the first three inductees in the Country Disc Jockey Hall of Fame (now Country Radio Seminar On-Air Hall of Fame Inductees) in 1975. Six years later, Turner was inducted into the Country Music Hall of Fame along with Vernon Dalhart.

Turner was the first radio host or announcer to be inducted into the Country Music Hall of Fame. The other two announcers inducted were Ralph Emery in 2007 and Kix Brooks (as part of Brooks & Dunn) in 2019 (Brooks succeeded Bob Kingsley as host of American Country Countdown in January 2006 and hosted until the end of 2024.).
