= KARW (Texas) =

Radio station in Longview, Texas (1948–1994)

- Longview, Texas; United States
- Broadcast area: Tyler-Longview, Texas
- Frequency: 1280 kHz

Ownership
- Owner: Pine Tree Media, Inc.

History
- First air date: October 27, 1948
- Last air date: October 1994
- Former call signs: KLTI (1948–1959); KLUE (1959–1986); KAAW (1986–1988); KLGV (1988–1992); KDOX (1991–1992, not used locally); KARW (1992–1995)

Technical information
- Facility ID: 52638
- Power: 1,000 watts (days only)
- Transmitter coordinates: 32°26′58″N 94°43′36″W

KARW (1280 AM) was a radio station in Longview, Texas, United States, which broadcast between 1948 and 1994. The station was last owned by Pine Tree Media, Inc. The station was built as KLTI by R. G. LeTourneau, owner of the Le Tourneau Technical Institute, in 1948. It was sold to the Bridge and Mahone families in 1959 and changed its call sign to KLUE. It operated as a Top 40 station during this time. In 1966, in response to a quip by John Lennon that The Beatles were becoming more popular than Jesus, the station held a "Beatles Bonfire", burning the group's albums and other memorabilia. The station was sold to McLarty Communications in 1980 and Pine Tree Media in 1982. In its final years of operation, the format changed from adult contemporary to oldies to urban contemporary, accompanied by four changes of call sign between 1986 and 1992. The station was burglarized in 1994 and left the air permanently three months later for nonpayment of its electricity bill; its broadcast license had already been designated for hearing concerning several unauthorized transfers of control, and an administrative law judge of the Federal Communications Commission denied renewal in 1995.

== History ==
=== Early years ===
R. G. LeTourneau, owner of the Le Tourneau Technical Institute, filed for a construction permit for a new radio station in Longview on June 27, 1947. Though he initially specified 960 kHz, he changed the application to 1280 in order to avoid a hearing. The Federal Communications Commission granted the application on May 19, 1948. The station was originally assigned the call sign KFRN, changing to KLTI before signing on October 27, 1948. LeTourneau, who had previously built America's first all-steel radio studio at a station in Portsmouth, New Hampshire, constructed KLTI's studios using then-new concrete techniques. KLTI was built alongside an FM outlet, KLTI-FM 105.9; the FM license was cancelled at LeTourneau's request in 1955.

In 1959, LeTourneau sold KLTI to the Bridge and Mahone families, doing business as Radio Longview, Inc.; the new ownership also ran KMHT at Marshall. The $100,500 purchase—inadvertently reported as $10,500 due to a wire service error—closed in September. The new owners renamed the station to KLUE and also expressed their desire to seek authorization for nighttime broadcasts and return to the FM dial. They also attempted to follow through on their promises of improved AM facilities; while their bid to increase power to 5,000 watts was dismissed in 1962, they did return to the FM dial in early March 1963 when KLUE-FM 105.7 made its debut. The new station carried "mood music" as well as the Mutual Broadcasting System and Texas State Network newscasts already airing on AM. Between 1963 and 1964, the station remodeled and expanded its studio facility.

=== Beatles Bonfire ===
A sequence of events in August 1966 would prove the most memorable in station history. Early in the month, the station announced that it would no longer play The Beatles, and its program director expressed hope that "the word beetle may soon again simply refer to the insect in this country". The controversy started with a statement by John Lennon that the group's popularity was eclipsing that of Jesus Christ. Thousands of Beatles records were gathered by the station for a Beatles Bonfire to be held the night of August 12, while the station needed extra receptionists to answer the telephone due to the number of calls received. (Sister station KMHT in Marshall also banned the Beatles, as did a number of other radio stations in the state.) KLUE's bonfire attracted 1,000 spectators and another 2,000 who drove past in their cars. (Another report estimated the crowd at 7,500.) News director Phil Ransom said that claims made by Lennon in A Spaniard in the Works included "anti-Christian comments that would make the godless Russian leaders blush".

The next day, KLUE's transmitter tower was struck by lightning. Equipment was extensively damaged, and news director Phil Ransom was knocked unconscious and transported to the hospital; the station was able to return to the air the next day.

=== After the bonfire ===
In December 1974, KLUE moved again into a new studio building at the same Signal Hill site. The station's reporting on corruption in Gregg County, led by Glen Ivey, earned it a 1979 award from the Texas State Network and other honors from the Texas Association of Broadcasters and United Press International.

After more than 20 years, H.A. Bridge announced the sale of KLUE to McLarty Communications of Little Rock, Arkansas in 1980. Among the programs carried by the station in the early years of McLarty ownership was the 1982 The Beatles at the Beeb special consisting of BBC studio sessions unheard until that point in the United States.

Pine Tree Media of Texarkana, Texas, the final owners of the 1280 frequency, acquired KLUE from McLarty in 1982; the station continued with its adult contemporary format until flipping to country in June 1984.

=== KAAW, KLGV, KDOX and KARW ===
In October 1986, KLUE became KAAW. The station promoted itself as "Pure Gold AM 1280", returning to an oldies format.

In 1988, Ken Tuck bought Pine Tree, and changes followed for KAAW, starting with a change in call letters to KLGV on April 27, 1988. Like KAAW, KLGV aired an oldies format. Phoenix Broadcasting Consultants programmed the station with its "Solid Gold" oldies format.

After filing for bankruptcy in February 1991, the station changed formats again to urban in May. It continued to go by KLGV locally even though its call letters had changed to KDOX on March 11. The format remained gospel after changing call letters one last time to KARW on June 30, 1992.

=== Silence and license renewal denied ===
On August 13, 1994, KARW was burglarized and forced off the air. The station would briefly return to the air at the end of September, but after a few weeks, mechanical problems led to the station going silent again. That silence would be made permanent when, on November 18, Southwestern Electric Power Company disconnected KARW's electricity for nonpayment.

The silence compounded more serious problems that had already emerged: in 1993, the FCC had designated KARW's license renewal for hearing.

The hearing designation order centered around several issues. One of them was a series of unauthorized transfers of control. After Ken Tuck died on May 27, 1990, American Plastics Products, Inc. acquired the promissory note that had been made by Tuck to pay previous owners Herbert Wren and Earl Jones for the radio station. American Plastics then proceeded to foreclose on the note and acquire Pine Tree without applying to the FCC for the necessary consent to the transfer of control. Wren and Jones then foreclosed on the American Plastics note, causing a second transfer of control that was not approved by the FCC, and Praise Media, Inc. then bought personal property of KARW and took over operations in March 1992, leading to a third change in operator, all without the approval of the commission. Even though Tuck was dead, the renewal application in August 1990 was filed in the name of Pine Tree, not American Plastics. In March 1995, the scope of the proceeding was expanded to include the silence of KARW.

In 1992, the FCC sent several letters to Pine Tree, requesting additional information and notifying the licensee of deficiencies in the license renewal. However, none of the letters ever elicited a response. As a result of the misrepresentations, silence, and false statements made by Praise Media manager Janet Washington as to the reasons for the incarceration of her husband, FCC administrative law judge John M. Frysiak denied KARW's renewal in August 1995.
