= KTLH (FM) =

Radio station in Hallsville, Texas

Simulcasts with KOYE, Frankston
- Hallsville, Texas; United States
- Broadcast area: Longview-Marshall
- Frequency: 107.9 MHz
- Branding: La Invasora 96.7 y 107.9

Programming
- Language: Spanish
- Format: Regional Mexican

Ownership
- Owner: Connoisseur Media; (Connoisseur Media, LLC.)
- Sister stations: KOOI; KOYE; KKUS; KYKX

History
- First air date: February 19, 2020
- Call sign meaning: Hallsville, Texas (city of license; reversed)

Technical information
- Licensing authority: FCC
- Facility ID: 198622
- Class: C2
- ERP: 50,000 watts
- HAAT: 110.0 meters (360.9 ft)
- Transmitter coordinates: 32°43′3″N 94°40′17″W

Links
- Public license information: Public file; LMS
- Website: lainvasora.fm

KTLH (107.9 FM) is a Connoisseur Media radio station, licensed to Hallsville, Texas, United States, and serves the Longview area with a Regional Mexican format, as a simulcast with KOYE in Frankston, Texas. Studios are located on Broadway Avenue in downtown Tyler; transmitter site is located in unincorporated Harrison County, northeast of Ashland, Texas.

KTLH signed on as the simulcast partner of Regional Mexican formatted 96.7 KOYE Frankston "La Invasora", replacing the lost coverage of former simulcast partner 92.3 KCUL-FM Marshall.

KTLH was taken dark on May 8, 2025, in anticipation of transferring the license for the station to Rose Capital City Trust, who will be responsible for divesture of the license if Connoisseur Media is not granted a waiver to own the station as part of its deal to purchase the entirety of Alpha Media's company portfolio. The station has currently been granted a 180 day reprieve from broadcasting.

== History ==
KTLH was first proposed by Alpha Media in early 2018, and received a permit to construct the facility on June 25, 2018. The construction permit was to expire in June 2021, and also forced Chalk Hill Media to move its displaced Henderson Class D translator, K300CX, which relays AM 1240 KDOK Kilgore, to a new operating channel. Chalk Hill media applied and was granted the move of K300CX to channel 291 (106.1 MHz), making way for the new Hallsville station to sign on.

After a week of testing the new signal with a looped instrumental piece and a basic "107.9 KTLH Hallsville" identification, KTLH joined Alpha Media sister station KOYE as a simulcast partner of Regional Mexican "La Invasora" on February 19, 2020, returning the format to the Longview/Marshall portion of the market.
