= KTLH =

KTLH may refer to:

- Tallahassee International Airport (ICAO code KTLH)
- KTLH (FM), a radio station (107.9 FM) licensed to serve Hallsville, Texas, United States
- KSSZ, a radio station (93.9 FM) licensed to serve Fayette, Missouri, United States, which held the call sign KTLH from June 1994 to September 1996
