= Mobberly Hotel =

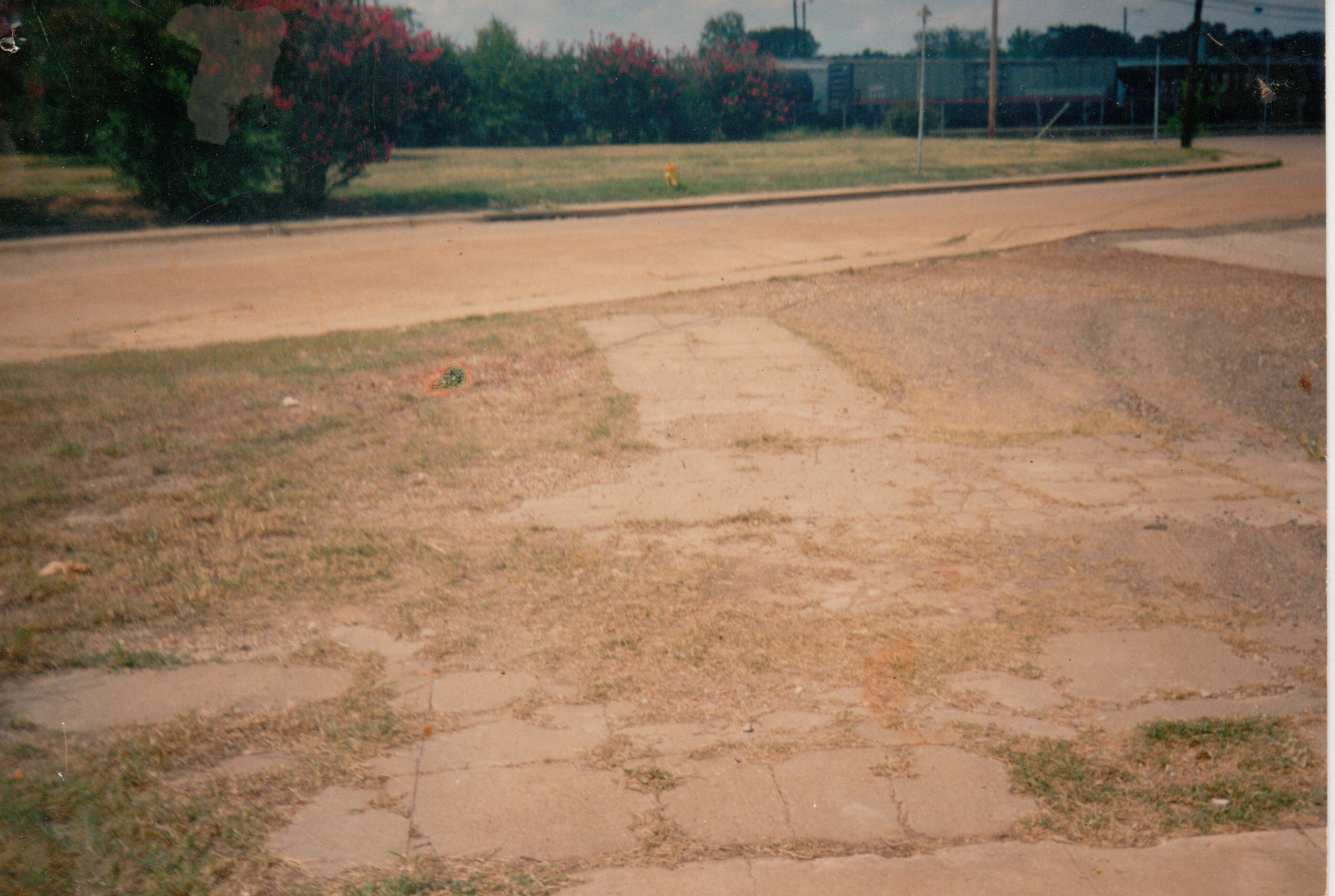
- Sidewalk and Foundation Remains of the Mobberly Hotel

- Location within Texas
- Former names: Mobberly House, Hotel Tecumseh
- Alternative names: Hotel Mobberly

General information
- Status: Destroyed by Fire
- Type: Hotel
- Location: 100 S. Mobberly Ave. Longview, Texas; United States
- Coordinates: 32.493438°N 94.729146°W
- Named for: James M. Mobberly
- Construction started: 1883
- Completed: 1884
- Demolished: June 13, 1965

Technical details
- Material: Brick
- Floor count: 3
- Lifts/elevators: None

Other information
- Number of rooms: 80

The Mobberly Hotel opened for business in 1884 in Longview, Texas, as one of the finest hotels between El Paso, Texas, and New Orleans, Louisiana. Popular with travelers and railroad employees alike, the lavishly furnished three-story, 80-room hotel served Longview for almost 80 years. The Mobberly Hotel closed in the early 1960s and a fire destroyed it during the early morning hours of Sunday, June 13, 1965.

== James M. Mobberly 1841-1917 ==
James "Jim" W. Mobberly was born in 1841 in Kentucky. At the beginning of the Civil War, Jim joined a Confederate cavalry unit. During war, the future hotel operator was arrested and sent to a prisoner-of-war camp in Rock Island, Illinois. After escaping to Canada, Jim and other family members moved to Texas in 1868. He constructed a lumber company on the Sabine River four miles east of the City of Longview.

In 1874 Jim married Mary Noel and entered the real estate and construction business. He also became active in Longview as a civic leader. He served on the City Council, Longview School Board and was a three-term Gregg County Commissioner. In 1883, Jim along with his brother Sam, constructed the Mobberly Hotel. He was active in the hotel business until he retired in 1893. Jim was listed as a director of the Galveston, Sabine, and St. Louis Railway Company in January, 1887.

On July 8, 1887, S. E. Noel, mother-in-law of Jim, died suddenly at the Mobberly Hotel. She was over 60 years of age and was a residence of Owensboro, Kentucky. She was interred in Longview. James M. Mobberly died in 1917.

== Samuel Haynes Mobberly 1842-1910 ==
Sam H. Mobberly was born on September 10, 1842, in Daviess County, Kentucky, and came from an old and honored Kentucky family. He was a member of the Baptist faith and a Mason.

He was a class of ready to die, never turning his back to the foe. At the first news of the strife between the States, he hurried to the nearest recruiting station and enlisted at Russellville in the 1st Kentucky Infantry under Col. Ben Harden Helms. Sam Mobberly was a genuine Southerner and was more faithful to his heritage than any other man.

Five years after the end of the Civil War, Mobberly married Miss Laura Rose Bennett, of Madison Station, Mississippi. They were married for 40 years. Comrade Mobberly was never ill until his last sickness which took his life. When the end came, he said: "I am ready." Samuel H. Mobberly died December 15, 1910, in the hotel which he constructed. He was survived by his wife and their four children. The last sad rites were performed by his Mason brothers. Samuel E. Mobberly became the Proprietor of the hotel.

== Samuel Ernest Mobberly (1879-1947) ==
The children of Samuel E. Mobberly were born in the Mobberly Hotel. In 1924, Samuel E. Mobberly was on the Board of Directors for The Citizens National Bank located in Longview. Searcy Birdsong Sr. became the manager of the hotel in 1931 due to Sam's failing health. After Samuel E. Mobberly's death in June, 1947 the hotel remained in the family for a few months while being managed by Searcy Birdsong, Jr. until it was sold to Harris-Hudson Hotel Company in 1948 and assets divided. Searcy Birdsong, Jr. was the nephew of Samual E. Mobberly and Mrs. Alamo Birdsong Mobberly.

== Mobberly Hotel: 1883-1884 ==
Construction on the Mobberly Hotel (also referred to as Mobberly House, and Hotel Mobberly) began in 1883 at the corner of Mobberly Ave. and Pacific Avenue near the International & Great Northern Depot located at the Junction in Longview, Texas. Brick for the building's facade was quarried out of red clay dirt and fired in a kiln near the area of present day Noel Dr. just off of Mobberly Ave.

== Mobberly Hotel: 1884-1910 ==
When the hotel opened for business in 1884, it was one of the most fashionable gathering places for social activities between New Orleans and El Paso. Young men and women often dined and danced there. The dining room (famous for serving delicious food) attracted many notables including famous opera singer Adelina Patti. Even men traveling on the railroad made the hotel their headquarters because of the fine food.

A parlor had 14 pieces of ebony furniture which included a grand piano.

A ballroom was located on the second floor which held many balls attended by dancers from all over the southern United States. Following many of the balls was a banquet held in the hotel's dining room.

The grand staircase, described as narrow with a landing between the first and second floors had beautifully carved banisters that were made of mahogany.

Furnishings for all the guest rooms were expensive and elaborate, made from cherry wood that included beds with carved posts described as being almost as high as the ceilings were, marble topped wash stands with porcelain wash bowls and pitchers with fresh water provided daily, white linen table cloths, crystal chandeliers, and a fireplace in every room.

On November 8, 1887, 15-year old Will Roberts was involved in an accident which he lost both of his feet. As the incoming St. Louis fast express was arriving it was rapidly approaching the Mobberly Hotel for supper. Roberts attempted to jump onto the moving train when he tripped on timbers piled near the track causing him to trip. He was a porter for the Alamo House located near the Mobberly Hotel at the Junction. After the accident he was returned to his home in Marshall, Texas.

On December 29, 1887, a wedding celebration ball for Dr. J. E. Clemens and Miss May C. Evans was held in the hotel dining room. Horse drawn carriages brought the party to the hotel accompanied by The Longview Cornet Band playing a wedding march while approximately 300 guests were waiting. The ball started at 10:30 p.m. and ended at midnight when the guests and wedding party were ushered to the adjoining dining room to enjoy the finest and most extensive dinner spread as seen in East Texas prior to the event. After eating guests continued to dance well into the early morning hours. This event placed Longview higher on the social level than other small cities.

Hampton Miller, a Longview minor, was arrested on February 19, 1888. He was charged for robbing the Mobberly Hotel sometime in 1887 when he stole several articles of clothing. Mr. Mobberly was not able to identify him however the minor was identified by several individuals who witnessed the theft.

The Lacey Telephone Company serviced the Mobberly from 1897-1910.

== Mobberly Hotel: 1910-1948 ==
During Samuel E. Mobberly's proprietorship the hotel was renovated with a new addition added on the south end referred to as the "annex". The original dining room that was located on the Mobberly Street side of the hotel was divided up and converted to guest rooms and the banquet room was enlarged and converted to the Mobberly Cafe.

According to a news report, on April 10, 1910, the hotel was fully booked.

W. K. Eckman of Kelly Plow Company had worked at the Mobberly Hotel 27 years prior as a Hotel Operator. He had a pocket folding ruler that had his name stamped on it which he lost during his employment at the Mobberly. He had assumed it was stolen. Through the years the ruler made its way to an artist in Philadelphia, Pennsylvania. In 1923 the artist mailed a letter to Mr. Eckman, which he replied describing the ruler. The artist made a request that he would return the ruler to its original owner with one request, that Mr. Eckman would will it to him when he died. He agreed and he got his ruler back after almost three decades. The design of the ruler was made of bone, four-folder, with German silver borders.

== Mobberly Hotel: 1948-1959 ==
Shortly after the hotel was sold to the Harris-Hotel Hudson Company in 1948, a gentleman from the railroad checked in and requested a certain room. When he was informed the particular room was rented to another guest the gentleman proceeded upstairs to ask the guest to move to a different room. The railroad gentleman had spent his nights in Longview at the Mobberly Hotel in that one certain room. The guest agreed and relocated to a different guest room.

During the Harris-Hudson Hotel Company ownership some guest rooms were refurnished with the Simmons' bedroom design. Running water was piped into the bedrooms and shower facilities installed

== Mobberly Hotel: 1960-1965 ==
On Friday, October 2, 1964, a robbery occurred at the Mobberly Hotel. A resident of the hotel who worked at Good Shepherd Hospital, by the name of Roy Black, discovered someone had entered his room while he was at work. Items that were missing were dress shirts, khaki pants, a can of pennies, a grey bag with a zipper, a couple pairs of slacks, shoes, and a couple of razors. Early the same day, a customer at the Cafe reported his motor boat was stolen off of his truck. This was among a string of robberies that occurred on Mobberly Avenue.

In 1964, then owner Patrick Ferchill began a renovation of the Mobberly to restore it to its former grandeur with plans to showcase his antique cars by rotating them out on a weekly basis in the hotel lobby. During the renovation process, on Tuesday, January 12, 1965, brick masons were working in the boiler room which was located in a one-story section of the hotel separate but connected to the three-story section. Some bricks had fallen in front of the doorway blocking the entrance so a worker busted out a window using a shovel so they could continue to transport mortar into the boiler room. When the window was shattered, glass was not the only thing that came down. An entire section of about 20' by 40' of the three-story brick facade of the hotel collapsed exposing rooms and furnishings. The roof was sagging significantly over the exposed floors causing fear in workers of possible further collapse.

An eyewitness saw the incident happen firsthand who not only was the hotel manager but also was a resident in the hotel. She woke up about 9 a.m. that morning and happened to look out of her window when the events occurred. According to the news article a maid had just left one of the rooms exposed just prior to the wall collapsing.

The cause of the collapse was determined to be rotten wood headers used over the windows which were common in buildings constructed in the late 1800s and early 1900s. In addition, tie rods were not used to support the brick wall and the bricks used were made of the sandstone type which were extremely soft compared to modern bricks. Water and electrical utilities were cut off shortly after which resulted in the hotel being vacated. Some individuals who lived in the hotel had to move out.

Three days later, on Friday, January 15, 1965, about 7:15 a.m., another large section of the three-story east wall of the Mobberly Hotel's south wing collapsed which left the entire eastern rooms exposed. The debris fell on the roof of the one-story boiler room damaging the roof and causing the boiler room walls to collapse themselves. Unknowingly the two events involving collapsing walls sealed the Mobberly Hotel's fate.

During the early morning hours, before sunrise, on Sunday, June 13, 1965, a passerby noticed flames through the hotel windows and contacted the fire department. The fire department arrived, blocking off Mobberly Ave. between Cotton St. and Methvin St. An elderly bystander watching the blaze before sunrise made the comment that every window in the hotel was lit up, which reminded him of the old days when the hotel was in business. Sunday afternoon the fire was out however the remains were still smoldering. All that remained was the first floor dining room section on the northeast end facing Pacific Ave. and half of the two-story addition on the south end of the original hotel building. The rest of the three-story structure was gutted leaving just walls and openings where glass windows used to be, allowing you to see the sky. It was determined the fire was set by a vagrant who had entered the building the night before. It took a crane with a flat steel plate used as a wrecking ball to knock the brick walls down.

== Mobberly Hotel Journal ==
Some events listed below may go into further detail under the "History" subcategory.

- 1883 Construction Commenced.
- 1884 Mobberly Hotel opened for business.
- 1886, Jan. 15 A ball given by The Knights of Pythias at the Mobberly house.
- 1887. Dec. 29 Wedding celebration ball for Dr. J. E. Clemens and Miss May C. Evans was held in the hotel dining room.
- 1888, Feb. 19 A minor was arrested, charged with robbing the Mobberly Hotel at the junction about a year before.
- 1895, May 17 Captain W. W. Winfield and W. K. Eckman leased the Mobberly Hotel changing the name to Hotel Tecumseh.
- 1903, Nov. 25 "Mobberly House - Longview, Texas - Within a half block of the T.S.V.& N.W. Ry. depot Solicits patronage of all travelers over that road. Special attention paid to ladies when alone. Reduced Rates to Families." *This ad appears in several editions.
- 1907, Oct. 1 Dr. B. C. Bussey of Houston, Texas leases the Mobberly Hotel.
- 1915, Apr. 11 Mrs. J. M. Mobberly, wife of James M. Mobberly, died in Longview where she had been a resident for over 40 years. She previously lived in Kentucky.
- 1924, Feb. 24 Newspaper reported Mobberly Avenue will be completed connecting Cotton and Methvin Streets. The paper said "...which places Mobberly avenue, to the Mobberly Hotel in fine condition."
- 1924, Mar. 31 "LADIES and MEN WANTED for local canvassing, $7.00 per day. Mr. Baker, Mobberly Hotel, Tuesday and Wednesday, 10 a.m. to 12 a.m.; 1 p.m. to 3 p.m."
- 1931 Searcy Birdson Sr. became manager of the hotel
- 1947 Samuel E. Mobberly died.
- 1948 Harris-Hudson Hotel Company out of Shreveport, Louisiana purchased the hotel from the Mobberly family.
- 1965, January 12 A three-story wall collapsed on the eastern wall in the south wing as a result of a mason using a shovel to bust out a window in the boiler room on the first floor. The utilities were cut prompting the closure of the hotel.
- 1965, January 15 Another three-story section of the exterior eastern wall on the Mobberly Hotel's south wing collapsed exposing all of the rooms in that part of the building. The debris also destroyed the boiler room in a one-story section down below.
- 1965, June 13 The vacant Mobberly Hotel is destroyed by fire.

== Mobberly Hotel Owners & Operators ==
Operator in this sense is referenced to the building and operations being leased out to someone other than the owner.

- 1884-1893 Owner: James M. Mobberly & Samuel H. Mobberly
- 1893-1917 Owner: Samuel H. Mobberly
- 1895, May 17 - 1907, Sep. 30: Operator: Captain W. W. Winfield and W. K. Eckman
- 1907, Oct. 1 - Unknown: Operator: Dr. B. C. Bussey of Houston, Texas
- 1917-1947 Owner: Samuel E. Mobberly
- 1948-Unknown Owner: Harris-Hudson Hotel Company
- 19??-1965 Owner: Patrick Ferchill (Building owner at time of fire)

== Mobberly Hotel Staff & Residents ==
This section does not include owners and lessees (unless they previously worked as an employee). Dates presented are based on year material was produced.

- Birdsong Jr., Search: Manager (1947)
- Birdsong Sr., Searcy: Manager (1931)
- Farrar, L. O Mr & Mrs: Manager (1955)
- Ferguson, Mrs. Birdie: Manager & Resident (1965)
- Quin, Tom: Manager (1910)

== Post-Mobberly Hotel ==
- 1965-19?? Fritz Cornealson
- Late 1960s: Property purchased by Fritz Cornealson of Cornealson Moving & Storage and constructed a warehouse on the former hotel property.
- ????-2013 A-1 Service Air Conditioning & Heating
- 2013 City of Longview purchased the property in February
- 2016: The warehouse and adjoining office building were demolished. Pacific Avenue was realigned through where the hotel formerly stood.

== Photo gallery ==
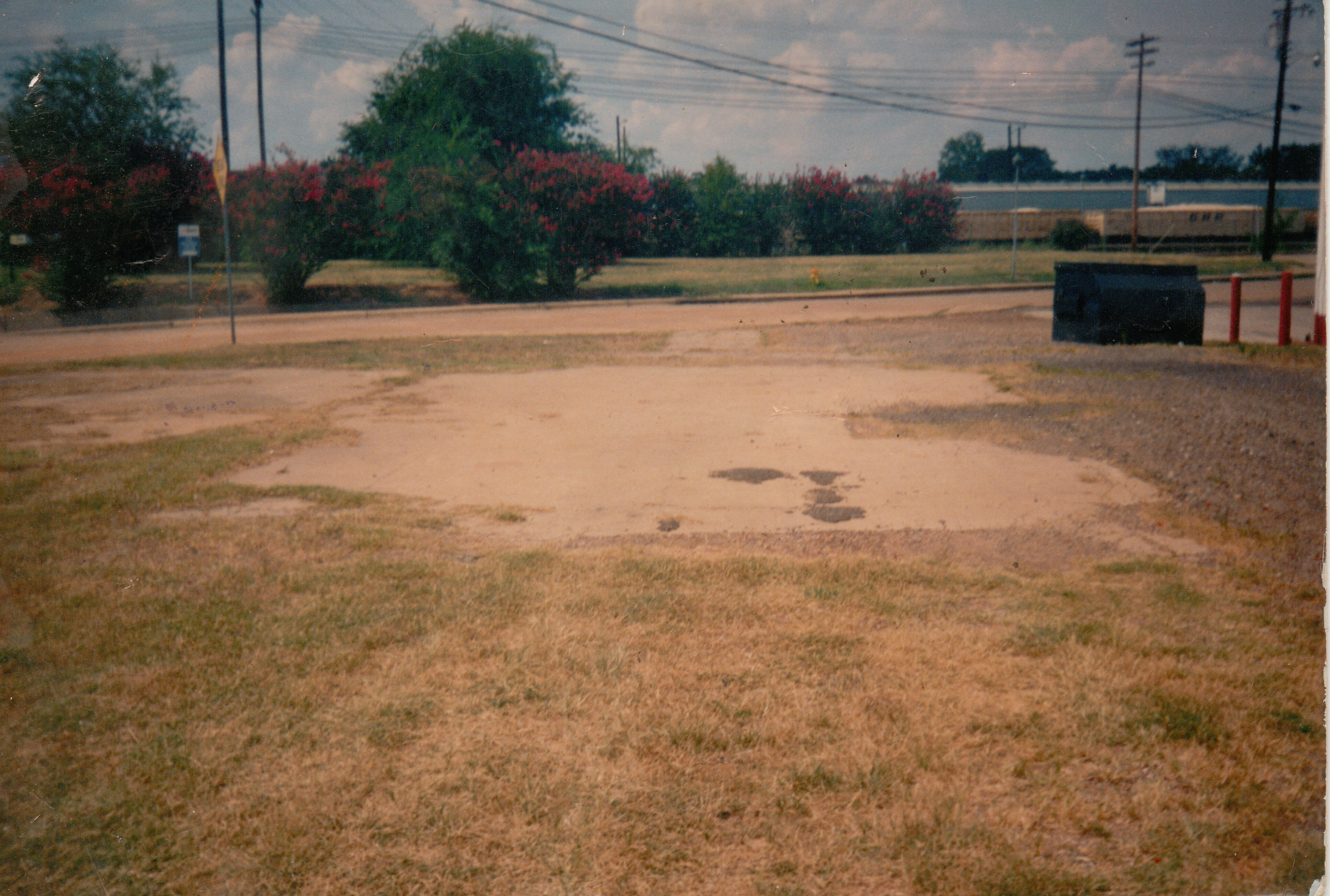
Remains of the foundation of the Mobberly Hotel in 1990. This section was part of the lobby.

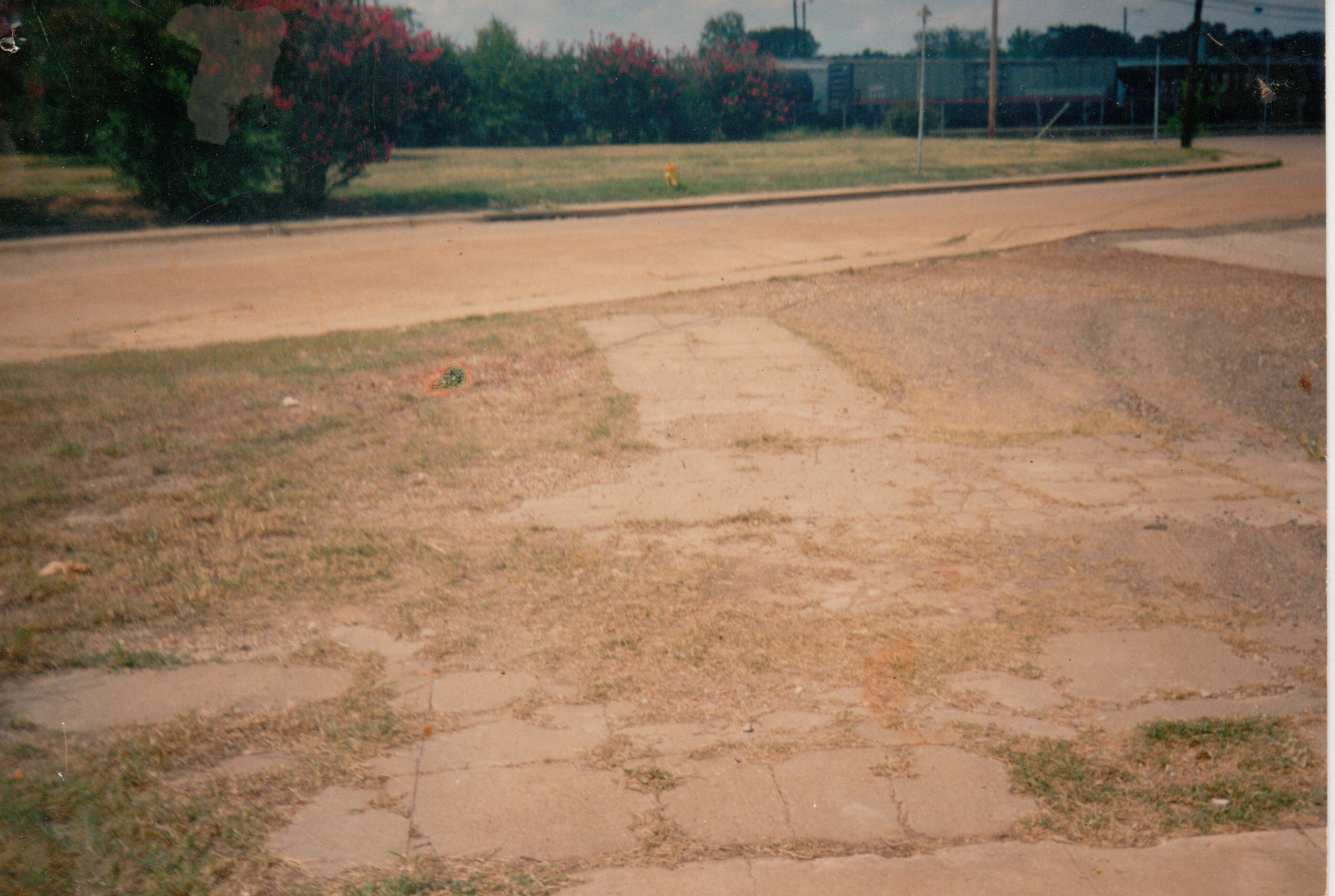
Remains of the foundation of the Mobberly Hotel in 1990. This section was the lobby entrance.

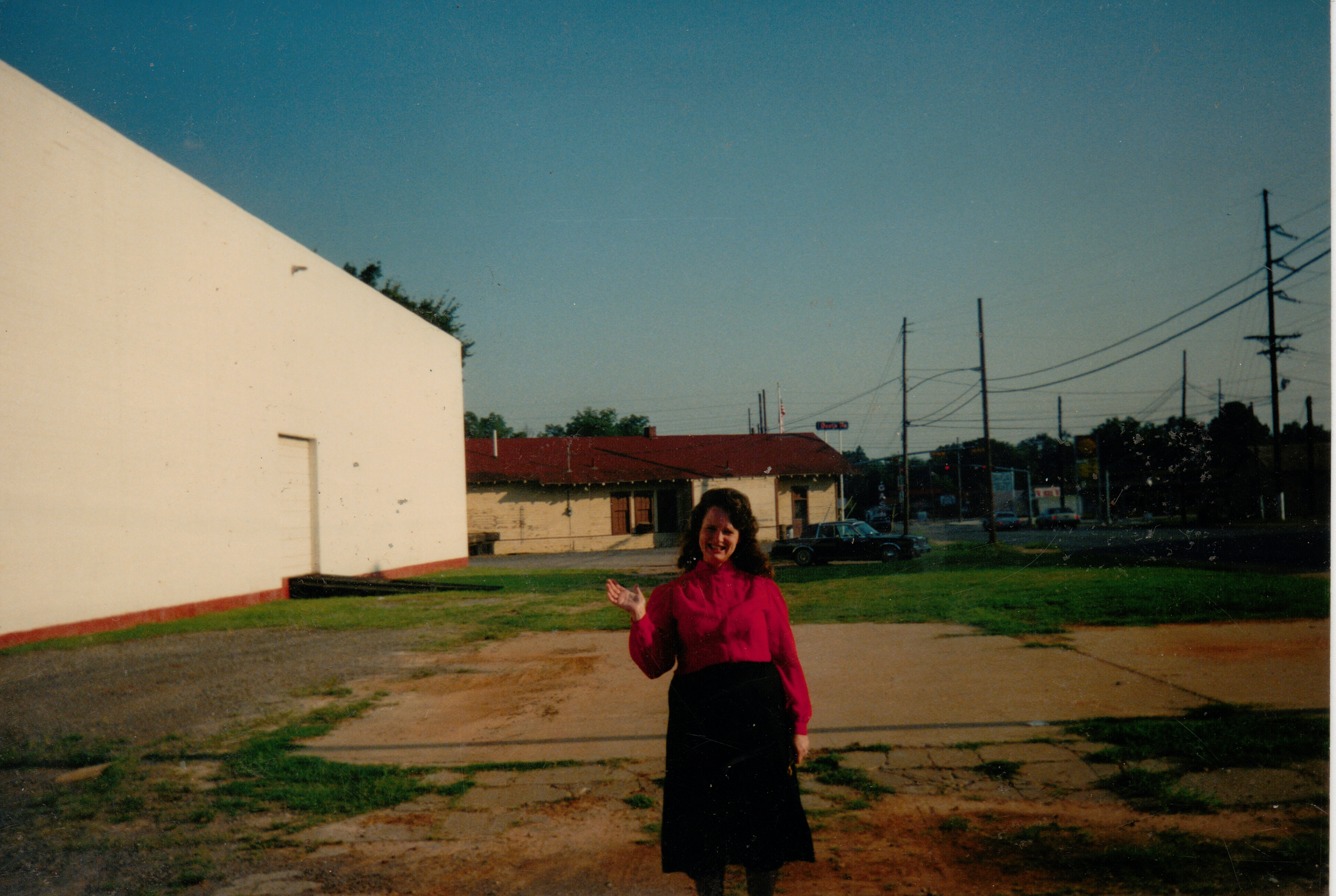
Judy standing on the foundation remains of the Mobberly Hotel.
