= KFRO-FM =

Radio station in Cuney, Texas

Simulcast with KFRO, Longview, TX
- Cuney, Texas; United States
- Broadcast area: Tyler–Longview
- Frequency: 99.7 MHz
- Branding: 99.7 & 94.1 KFRO

Programming
- Format: Classic hits

Ownership
- Owner: RCA Broadcasting; (Scottie Rice)
- Sister stations: KFRO

History
- First air date: October 10, 2018
- Former call signs: KSOC (2017–2018); KOEE (2018–2019); KVUT (2019-2024)
- Call sign meaning: Adapted from KFRO (AM)

Technical information
- Licensing authority: FCC
- Facility ID: 198816
- Class: A
- ERP: 1,600 watts
- HAAT: 154 meters (505 ft)
- Transmitter coordinates: 32°8′42.3″N 95°19′52.6″W

Links
- Public license information: Public file; LMS
- Webcast: Listen live
- Website: kfroradio.com

KFRO-FM (99.7 FM) is a commercial radio station licensed to Cuney, Texas, United States, and serving the Tyler–Longview area. Owned by RCA Broadcasting of Longview, Texas, it carries a classic hits format in a simulcast with KFRO and their associated translator, branded "99.7 and 94.1 KFRO". The transmitter is on Bois D Arc Drive at Hilltop Trail in Bullard, Texas.

Prior to May 24, 2024, the station operated as noncommercial educational KVUT, a public radio station under ownership of the University of Texas at Tyler.

== History ==
=== Construction and sign-on ===
KVUT was initially proposed by New Wavo Communications Group, owners of co-channel KVST in Huntsville, Texas. New Wavo filed a short form application with the Federal Communications Commission, which was granted on November 6, 2015. The facility's transmission site was proposed to be constructed near the small town of Cuney, giving the community its first licensed broadcast service.

The construction permit was granted the call sign KSOC on October 18, 2017. The proposed facility was permitted to operate, once licensed, at 100 watts, from an elevation of −9.8 meters (−32 ft) in height above average terrain (HAAT). Before it was built, New Wavo sold the construction permit for the facility to North Texas Radio Group, L.P. on August 14, 2017. The facility call sign was changed to KOEE on September 18, 2018, inheriting the call letters from its sister station in Tipton, Oklahoma, which in turn, became KSOC. The KSOC call sign was long utilized by Urban One's urban adult contemporary station KZMJ in the Dallas-Fort Worth Metroplex, as "K-Soul 94.5".

The station received an initial "License to Cover" from the Federal Communications Commission. It signed on the air on October 10, 2018.

=== University ownership ===
Logo as KVUT

The station changed its call sign to KVUT on December 19, 2019. On June 16, 2020, North Texas Radio Group, LP filed to transfer the license of KVUT to The University of Texas at Tyler, after a deal was reached to sell the station to the University for $120,000.

The station began broadcasting in "soft launch" mode - testing programming - on May 13, 2021. A public event was held to celebrate the station's arrival in the fall of 2021.

During this soft launch, the station carried public radio news programs such as Morning Edition, All Things Considered, Here and Now, and Marketplace in the day. At night, jazz music from the UT Tyler Jazz Ensemble at night. KVUT officially signed on the air on September 14, 2021. Local programming consists of news and public affairs, with more local content to be added over time.

The transmitter and tower were set up at a university-owned site in Bullard, where it operates with 1,600 watts @ 154 meters. The better power and antenna height helped the station to add the communities of Tyler and Jacksonville to its expanded coverage area. Studios for the station were located on the main campus of The University of Texas at Tyler, 3900 University Blvd. in Tyler. KVUT broadcasts from within the R. Don Cowan Fine and Performing Arts Center (otherwise known as the Cowan Center).

KVUT was the first local public media outlet in East Texas. For public television, the area's PBS service is still provided only on cable via KERA-TV in Dallas or KLTS-TV in Shreveport, part of the Louisiana Public Broadcasting network.

In early April 2022, KVUT changed its website domain name to kvut.org. It was originally uttr.org (short for "UT-Tyler Radio").

=== KVUT goes silent ===
At 5pm on May 24, 2024, at the end of school year, KVUT ceased operations and went off the air. UT Tyler College of Arts and Sciences Dean Neil Gray thanked the station's staff, volunteers and donors, but said the university's resources could be used for other projects to train students in the communications industry. The station was purchased with the intent to broadcast programming from National Public Radio (NPR) along with local news, weather, and community information. During evenings and overnight, KVUT aired jazz music from the PubJazz network. The station, like most nonprofits, sought donations on the air and on its website.

In September 2024, Scottie Rice’s RCA Broadcasting, owner of KFRO in Longview, announced that it would purchase KVUT for $100,000. RCA will revert the station to commercial operation as a simulcast of Longview AM station 1370/94.1 KFRO's classic hits format and returning the KFRO-FM call sign to the dial. The KFRO-FM call sign was utilized by 95.3 KWLL for the majority of the last 30 years.

=== KFRO simulcast ===
On November 22, 2024, the sale of the station was granted, with 99.7 returning to the air, using a stunt format of television and movie themes.

On December 5, 2024, stunting ended after the closing of the deal between the University and new owner, with a direct simulcast of KFRO 1370/94.1 Longview beginning at 2:00 pm. 99.7, 94.1, and 1370 were broadcasting Christmas music for the season, with regular classic hits programming beginning for 99.7, and returning to 94.1 and 1370.

On December 26, 2024, the KFRO stations returned to the "Classic Hits" format at 12:05am. The KFRO stations play the top hits of the disco era into the early 2000s.
