= KOOI =

Radio station in Jacksonville, Texas

- Jacksonville, Texas; United States
- Broadcast area: Tyler-Longview area
- Frequency: 106.5 MHz
- Branding: 106-5 Jack FM

Programming
- Language: English
- Format: Adult hits
- Affiliations: Jack FM; Longview Lobos; Dallas Cowboys Radio Network

Ownership
- Owner: Connoisseur Media; (Connoisseur Media, LLC.)
- Sister stations: KKUS; KOYE; KYKX; KTLH

History
- First air date: 1967 (as KEBE-FM)
- Former call signs: KEBE-FM (1968–1975); KOOI-FM (1983–1986); KOOI (1975–1983; 1986-present)
- Call sign meaning: 001 (represents the original Waller Broadcasting owned east Texas FM facility)

Technical information
- Licensing authority: FCC
- Facility ID: 70740
- Class: C
- ERP: 100,000 watts
- HAAT: 451 meters (1,480 ft)
- Transmitter coordinates: 32°3′40.00″N 95°18′50.00″W

Links
- Public license information: Public file; LMS
- Webcast: Listen live
- Website: 1065jackfm.com

KOOI (106.5 FM) is a Connoisseur Media radio station broadcasting an adult hits format. Licensed to Jacksonville, Texas, United States, the station serves the Tyler-Longview area, and is the East Texas broadcast radio home of the Dallas Cowboys. Studios are located on Broadway Avenue in downtown Tyler, while the transmitter is located north of Jacksonville, in the town of Mt. Selman.

== History ==
Licensed in 1968 by Dudley Waller, as KEBE-FM, 106.5 was a simulcast of AM 1400 (known as the KEBE Corral). From the beginning, 106.5 was an affiliate of the ABC radio network. The call letters were changed to the current KOOI in 1975. K-double-O-I is documented as the first radio station in East Texas to have an automation system. Waller bought a Schaffer automation using cart machines on carousels and 10, reel-to-reel decks, providing a beautiful music/easy listening format to East Texas.

Although the call letters appear to be a random assignment, they were actually specifically chosen by Dudley Waller, representing the first (001) of several FM facilities he wished to own throughout East Texas.

K=West of the Mississippi
O=zero in Roman numerals
O=zero in Roman numerals
I=one in Roman numerals

Had Waller received a second construction permit, his plan was to request its call letters to be KOII.

In 1983, KOOI became the first FM radio station in East Texas to broadcast in stereo. The station began to transition from the beautiful music format, which was starting to falter in ratings, to a soft rock direction as Sunny 106.5 K-double-O-I.

In 1987, KOOI moved to its current transmitter site at Mount Selman which also serves as the tower site of fellow Jacksonville licensed stations KETK-TV and KBJS. The move of the KOOI transmission site and associated upgrades gave this facility the most powerful (Class C) FM at the highest elevation in East Texas. As a result, KOOI's coverage area spans a large portion of its East Texas home, reaching as far away as Nacogdoches and Crockett to the south, and Quitman and Pittsburg to the north.

In 1997, KOOI transitioned from Easy Listening/Soft Rock to an Adult Contemporary format under Program Director and morning host Dave Moreland. The station remained branded as Sunny 106.5 and achieved great success in this incarnation. Using the slogan "Your Life. Your Music. East Texas.", "Sunny 106.5" was live and local during all dayparts. In addition to Moreland, other "Sunny 106.5" on-air personalities during this time included Jack Schell, Rick Watson, Rodd Wayne, Bill Davis, Janie Baker and Rhonda Parsons.

On January 7, 2005, after 47 years of ownership, Dudley Waller sold KOOI 106.5 to Access.1 of New York, along with KYKX, KOYE, KKUS, and 1370 KFRO for $26 million. Even though he had sold off his original Jacksonville FM facility, Waller Media did not include the heritage AM facility in this transaction.

On January 21, 2013, KOOI changed format from adult contemporary to classic hits, while still utilizing the "Sunny 106.5" branding.

Alpha Media LLC purchased KOOI and eight other stations in Texas and Louisiana from Access.1 effective April 14, 2015, at a price of $13.75 million.

On June 26, 2017, KOOI changed format from classic hits to variety hits, branded as "106.5 Jack FM".
