= KPRO (Texas) =

Radio station in Marshall, Texas

- Marshall, Texas; United States
- Broadcast area: Longview–Marshall area
- Frequency: 1410 kHz

Ownership
- Owner: RCA Broadcasting LLC
- Sister stations: KFRO

History
- First air date: September 3, 1957 (as KADO)
- Last air date: June 1, 2021 (as KPRO)
- Former call signs: KADO (1957–1965); KDOX (1965–1976); KKYR (1976–1983); KCUL (1983–2015); KZEY (2015–2019); KCUL (2019–2020)

Technical information
- Licensing authority: FCC
- Facility ID: 18262
- Class: D
- Power: 500 watts (day); 90 watts (night)
- Transmitter coordinates: 32°29′30.5″N 94°21′52.7″W
- Translator: See § Translator

Links
- Public license information: Public file; LMS

KPRO (1410 AM) was a terrestrial American radio station licensed to serve the city of Marshall, Texas. KPRO was last owned by RCA Broadcasting LLC. The station broadcast the Galaxy Nostalgia Network, a nostalgia talk format.

On December 19, 2014, Access.1 filed to transfer the license of KCUL 1410 to RCA Broadcasting LLC of Texas. The FCC approved the transfer to RCA Broadcasting on February 7, 2015. The sale to RCA Broadcasting was consummated March 20, 2015, ending Access.1's 15-year ownership of KCUL.

On July 10, 2018, RCA Broadcasting was granted a construction permit to build a 250-watt FM translator to relay the-then KZEY programming. The translator was to operate at 102.5 MHz, transmitting from the KPRO transmitter site at 3120 W Houston Street in Marshall. The translator signed on the air on October 17, 2019.

== Translator ==
Broadcast translator for KPRO
| Call sign | Frequency | City of license | FID | ERP (W) | HAAT | Class | FCC info | Notes |
|---|---|---|---|---|---|---|---|---|
| DK273DH | 102.5 FM | Marshall, Texas | 201074 | 250 | 64 m (210 ft) | D | LMS | First air date: October 17, 2019; Deleted on June 1, 2021 |

== History ==
KPRO first signed on the air in 1957 as KADO, and was owned by the Caddo Broadcasting Company. 1410 was built at 200 Interstate 20 West, along I-20 and highway 59 south on the feeder road. 1410 was a complete Gates turn-key facility, including a BC500K transmitter and Gates Phasor. 1410 was sold many many times in its early days.

In 1965, 1410 was and the call letters were changed to KDOX.

In 1976, 1410 changed formats and its call letters, becoming KKYR "Kicker 1410". KKYR was a country music station, but only lasted six years due to saturation by the FM country stations.

On November 11, 1983, 1410 changed call letters again to KCUL. For 20 years, KCUL-AM-FM played oldies (50s and 60s rock and roll). The KCUL call letters were originally on 1540 (now KAMM) in University Park, Texas from 1949 to 1967.

In 2005 (with the acquisition of the Waller Media stations by Access.1), the live, local oldies programming ceased. Access.1 created a trimulcast of 104.1 KKUS Tyler and 1370 KFRO Longview, "The Ranch" (Classic Country).

KCUL, for a brief period, switched to Christian Talk from the Moody Bible Institute.

KCUL formerly simulcast the Fox Sports Radio Network with former sister station KFRO.

The station was still located at its original transmitter site along I-20 at the Hwy 59 exit. The control point was once again at the transmitter and studio site.

On March 20, 2015, RCA Broadcasting officially closed on KCUL, and the FCC consummated the sale from Access.1 to RCA Broadcasting. KCUL was RCA's first radio station.

On April 24, 2015, 1410 KCUL changed its call sign to KZEY. This was to completely distance the AM from the FM that was kept by Access.1 and went into an LMA sales agreement with Alpha Media. It was also done to better position 1410 in Marshall, as the KZEY-FM call sign was in the market for 10+ years.

On October 1, 2019, KCUL-FM was acquired by RCA Broadcasting, LLC, reuniting the legendary combo of 1410 AM and 92.3 FM.

On October 22, 2019, the KCUL call sign returned to AM 1410 after more than four years. The return was short, as KCUL and KPRO switched call letters on May 27, 2020.

RCA Broadcasting surrendered KPRO's license to the Federal Communications Commission for cancellation on May 30, 2021; the license was cancelled on June 1, 2021, along with the construction permit for K273DH.

== Owners ==
1957-1958 Caddo Broadcasting Company (Virgil E. Stone and J.D. Johnson)

1958-1959 Marshall Broadcasting Corporation (William R. Sinkin)

1959-1964 Lone Star Steel Company (Now part of U.S. Steel)

1964-1966 Gemini Enterprises (Orman L. Kimbrough and Delwin W. Morton)

1966-1968 Gemini Enterprises II (Orman L. Kimbrough and Delwin W. Morton)

1968-1975 KDOX, Incorporated

1975-1975 Singleton & King Broadcasting, Incorporated

1975-1980 Big Country Broadcasting, Incorporated

1980-1983 Citizens Broadcasting, Incorporated

1983-1990 Gordon Media Corporation

1990-2000 East Texas Stereo, Incorporated (A.T. "Tommy" Moore)

2000-2015 Access.1 Texas License Company LLC

March 20, 2015 – 2021 present RCA Broadcasting LLC.

== Studio locations ==
- 1957-1958: R.L. Roden Property Hwy 59 South, Marshall, Texas (today, 200 Interstate 20 West, Marshall, Texas)
- 1958-1962: 213-A East Austin Street, Marshall, Texas
- 1962-1966: 201 East Austin Street, Marshall, Texas
- 1966-1974: 400 Pinecrest Drive East, Marshall, Texas
- 1974–2021: 200 Interstate 20 West, Marshall, Texas

== Former programming ==
The station previously aired Fox Sports Radio, but the Fox Sports ended on April 1, 2015. A completely new format to Marshall was launched on April 1, 2015.

Between 1983 and 2005, 1410 KCUL was an oldies rock and roll station, featuring music of the 1950s-1970s. When 92.3 KEEP became KCUL-FM the oldies format was simulcast on both 1410 and 92.3. In the mornings, the KCUL stations featured "Open Line" the on air classifieds.

From 2005 to 2012, the on-air staff included Gary P. Walker, Don Jones, Mandee Montana, Dave Rousseau, and Tom Perryman. In the late 1940s, Perryman started his career at 1400 KEBE, "The KEBE Corral," in Jacksonville, Texas. In the mid-1950s, Tom was at KSIJ (now KEES) 1430 in Gladewater, Texas. It was at KSIJ that Perryman brought Elvis to East Texas, and gave Elvis some of his first work. It was also at KSIJ that Tom met Jim Reeves, Floyd Cramer, and Johnny Horton. Then Tom went on to host the Opry Star Spotlight on 650 WSM in Nashville, as well as becoming one of the most famous Opry announcers of all time. Before leaving WSM, he hired his replacement, Ralph Emery. Tom and Jim Reeves then bought KGRI-AM-FM in Henderson, Texas. Later Tom and Mary Reeves bought WMTS-AM-FM in Murfreesboro, Tennessee. The Perrymans and Mary Reeves sold WMTS-AM-FM in the early 80s, and Perryman went into retirement. Perryman was convinced to come back to East Texas by Dudley Waller (former owner of KKUS) and Rick Guest (former GM of Waller and Access.1), to boost the ratings of the fledgling classic country station (The Ranch). Tom agreed to join The Ranch, and has kept it consistently at the top of the ratings.

1410 KCUL, along with 1370 KFRO and 104.1 KKUS, were the radio homes of the Longview Lobos High School football team.

Prior to May 2013, KCUL aired a Christian talk format from the Moody Bible Institute called "The Word".

In May 2013, 1410 KCUL and 1370 KFRO switched formats from "The Word" to Fox Sports.

In its final years, KPRO 1410, along with sister station KFRO, were the key stations of the Galaxy Nostalgia Network, and the award-winning program "Galaxy Moonbeam Nightsite".

== Engineering ==
1410 KPRO was licensed for 500 watts day with a two-tower directional pattern, and 90 watts night with a two-tower directional pattern.

1410 KPRO had only had three transmitters: a 1957 Gates BC500K, a 1983 Harris MW-1A, and a Harris Gates 1.

== Former sister stations ==
1410 KPRO was owned by Access.1 of New York, its East Texas sister stations were: 92.3 KCUL-FM Marshall, 1370 KFRO Longview, 104.1 KKUS Tyler, 105.7 KYKX Longview, 96.7 KOYE Frankston, and 106.5 KOOI Jacksonville.
