= KTAA =

Bott Radio Network station in Big Sandy–Longview, Texas

- Big Sandy, Texas; United States
- Broadcast area: Longview-Marshall
- Frequency: 90.7 MHz

Programming
- Format: Christian radio
- Network: Bott Radio Network

Ownership
- Owner: Bott Radio Network; (Community Broadcasting, Inc.)

History
- First air date: May 6, 1994
- Former call signs: KBAU (1994–2000)

Technical information
- Licensing authority: FCC
- Facility ID: 1247
- Class: C3
- ERP: 5,800 watts
- HAAT: 157.0 meters (515.1 ft)
- Transmitter coordinates: 32°37′50.00″N 94°53′44.00″W

Links
- Public license information: Public file; LMS
- Website: bottradionetwork.com

KTAA (90.7 FM) is a radio station broadcasting a Christian radio format. Licensed to Big Sandy, Texas, United States, the station serves the Longview-Marshall area. The station is currently owned by Bott Radio Network, through licensee Community Broadcasting, Inc.

== History ==
The station was assigned the call letters KBAU on 1994-05-06. On 2000-10-24, the station changed its call sign to the current KTAA.

== Translators ==
Broadcast translator for KTAA
| Call sign | Frequency | City of license | FID | ERP (W) | HAAT | Class | FCC info |
|---|---|---|---|---|---|---|---|
| K217CP | 91.3 FM | Paris, Texas | 81606 | 250 | 75.0 m (246 ft) | D | LMS |
