= KYKX =

Radio station in Longview, Texas

- Longview, Texas; United States
- Broadcast area: Tyler-Longview area
- Frequency: 105.7 MHz (HD Radio)
- Branding: Kicks 105-7 KYKX

Programming
- Language: English
- Format: Country
- Subchannels: HD2: Classic country (KKUS simulcast)
- Affiliations: Premiere Networks

Ownership
- Owner: Connoisseur Media; (Connoisseur Media, LLC.)
- Sister stations: KOOI-FM; KKUS-FM; KOYE-FM; KTLH

History
- First air date: March 3, 1963 (63 years ago) (as KLUE-FM)
- Former call signs: KLUE-FM (1963–1969); KHER-FM (1969–1974)
- Call sign meaning: "Kicks" (station branding)

Technical information
- Licensing authority: FCC
- Facility ID: 54844
- Class: C0
- ERP: 100,000 watts
- HAAT: 352 meters (1,155 ft)
- Transmitter coordinates: 32°35′37″N 94°49′10″W
- Translator: See § Translators

Links
- Public license information: Public file; LMS
- Webcast: Listen Live
- Website: kykx1057.com

KYKX (105.7 FM) is a Connoisseur Media radio station, licensed to Longview, Texas, United States, and serving East Texas with a country music format. KYKX features programming from the Bobby Bones Radio Show. KYKX maintains two separate studios; 4408 North US Highway 259 in Longview, and 210 South Broadway Ave., Suite 100 in Tyler. The transmitter site is located near FM 1844 and SH 300 in Upshur County, Texas.

== Translators ==
Broadcast translators for KYKX
Call sign	Frequency	City of license	FID	ERP (W)	HAAT	Class	Transmitter coordinates	FCC info	Notes
K291CH	106.1 FM	Tyler, Texas	156984	68	80 m (262 ft)	D	32 21' 5.5" N/95 18' 6.8" W	LMS	First airdate: February 5, 2014 (as 97.5 K248CC Lindale)
K279CI	103.7 FM	Longview, Texas	156836	250	181 m (594 ft)	D	32 35' 36.5" N/94 49' 10.8" W	LMS	First airdate: January 23, 2017 (relays HD2)

== Sister stations ==
KYKX's East Texas sister stations are 104.1 KKUS Tyler, 96.7 KOYE Frankston, 106.5 KOOI Jacksonville, and 107.9 KTLH Hallsville.

== History ==
KYKX can trace its roots back to Longview's first FM station, KLTI-FM, which went on the air at 105.9 MHz on October 27, 1948. KLTI-FM was founded and operated by R.G. LeTourneau of the LeTourneau Institute and LeTourneau Industries, and was co-operated with KLTI 1280 kHz. KLTI-FM ran an easy listening and classical music format, and provided functional music to local businesses. Functional music on FM was a predecessor of Muzak, providing background music to businesses and operated via a decoder box that would receive a tone from the station that muted the station's commercials. KLTI AM and FM transmitted from a tower on Signal Hill in south Longview, across from LeTourneau Industries. The tower, a south Longview landmark because of its unique Eiffelized style, still stands today and is used by low power television station KLGV-LP. KLTI-FM went off the air sometime in 1955 or 1956.

In 1959, H.A. (Tony) Bridge and Radio Longview, Inc purchased KLTI, including the Signal Hill tower, transmitter, and studios. This purchase also included equipment from the defunct KLTI-FM that was most likely used in some extent to bring Longview's second FM station to the air 4 years later. Bridge changed the calls of KLTI to KLUE and put in place a Top 40 format that was a fixture in Longview on 1280 kHz until the early 1980s.

On March 3, 1963, Bridge signed on KLUE-FM at 105.7 MHz. Its initial power was 6.2 kW. KLUE-FM was not a simulcast of 1280 KLUE, and most likely had an automated easy listening format, with stacks of records repeating every day. In 1967, KLUE-FM upgraded their power to 36 kW.

In 1969, the calls were changed to KHER-FM.

On July 1, 1974, KHER-FM was sold to Rusty Reynolds' and Dick Osborne's Stereo 105 Inc., the calls were changed to KYKX, and the country music format began, and has maintained the format to the present. Rusty eventually moved the transmitter to West Mountain at 100KW, and was upgraded to a "Class C". The studios were moved to Judson Road.

On November 1, 1985, KYKX was sold to Radio Sungroup of Texas, Inc. During Sungroup's ownership, The KYKX transmitter site was moved to the corner of SH 300 and 1844

On July 23, 1998, KYKX was sold to Sunburst Media

On October 18, 2000, KYKX was sold to Waller Media.

On January 7, 2005, KYKX was sold to Access.1 Texas License Company LLC.

Alpha Media LLC purchased KYKX and eight other stations in Texas and Louisiana from Access.1 effective April 14, 2015, at a price of $13.75 million.
