= KDPM (FM) =

Radio station in Marshall, Texas

- Marshall, Texas; United States
- Broadcast area: Longview/Marshall area
- Frequency: 92.3 MHz
- Branding: 92.3 The Depot

Programming
- Language: English
- Format: Country; classic rock

Ownership
- Owner: 92.3 The Depot LLC

History
- First air date: June 8, 1988
- Former call signs: KEEP (1988–1992); KCUL-FM (1992–2020); KPRO (March–May 2020); KCUL (May–October 2020)
- Call sign meaning: "Marshall Depot"

Technical information
- Licensing authority: FCC
- Facility ID: 18263
- Class: A
- ERP: 5,800 watts
- HAAT: 100 meters (330 ft)
- Transmitter coordinates: 32°32′26″N 94°24′3″W

Links
- Public license information: Public file; LMS
- Website: 923fmthedepot.com

KDPM (92.3 FM; "The Depot") is a terrestrial American radio station, which is currently broadcasting a full-service hybrid country and classic rock music format. Licensed to Marshall, Texas, United States, the station serves the Longview-Marshall East Texas area. The station is owned by 92.3 The Depot, LLC.

The Depot studio is located in downtown Marshall. The station logo features the historic Marshall Texas Railroad Depot. KDPM 92.3 The Depot is a proud member of the Marshall Chamber of Commerce.

== History ==
The facility went on the air on June 6, 1988, as KEEP, and was originally the FM counterpart to KCUL (1410 AM). The facility's construction permit and subsequent license was originally applied for in 1985. KEEP was initially owned by East Texas Stereo Inc. (Tommy Moore of Shreveport).

=== KCUL oldies stereo combo ===
In November 1992, the station changed its call sign to KCUL-FM to match the AM sister station.

KCUL AM & FM was a full-service oldies station that served the city of Marshall, Texas for over 2 decades. KCUL AM/FM was completely live on-air talent 24/7. One of the featured programs was the morning swap shop.

In 2000, the longtime owner of KCUL-AM/FM, East Texas Stereo Inc. sold the combo to Access.1 of New York. The sale coincided with the sale of Cary Kamp's Shreveport, Louisiana cluster to Access.1.

=== KCUL en Español ===
In 2005, KCUL-FM left its '50s to '70s oldies format after a 20-year run, flipping to a Regional Mexican format, becoming a simulcast partner of 96.7 KOYE in Frankston, Texas.

In 2013, the FCC forced Access.1 to sell two of its FM stations, so it was decided that KCUL-FM and 92.1 KSYR in Shreveport would be those stations, releasing both of them to Cosecha Communications LLC, as Trustee (a trust), and were intended to be sold at a later date. Due to the eventual sale of the bulk of the Access.1 stations in both East Texas and northwestern Louisiana, Access.1 ended up keeping KCUL-FM and KSYR, and entered into a shared services lease with Alpha Media, which ended in 2019. Alpha had an option to purchase the stations but couldn't exercise the option due to ownership limits set by the FCC.

On September 2, 2015, Access.1 once again regained ownership of KCUL-FM and KSYR, after the sale of their larger stations to Alpha Media.

At its zenith from 2005 to 2013, "La Invasora" was simulcast on 96.7 KOYE in Frankston, 92.1 KSYR in Benton, Louisiana, and 92.3 KCUL-FM Marshall. With the combined coverage area of these three signals, the Regional Mexican format spanned from Malakoff, Texas to Minden, Louisiana, and remained one of the few, if not only, Spanish language formats serving several of the small towns around East Texas and northwestern Louisiana.

On November 30, 2015, Access.1 ceased to exist. Access.1's remaining three stations KCUL-FM, KFRO, and KSYR, were folded into A.1 Investco LLC, controlled by Kevin Gunderson the CEO of Guggenheim Capital.

In January 2019, Access.1 decided to divest their remaining three radio stations KCUL-FM Marshall, KSYR Shreveport, and WGYM Hammonton. KSYR was sold first, then KCUL-FM, and WGYM on October 28, 2019, ending Access.1 as a corporation on October 28, 2019.

On June 19, 2019, A.1 Investco filed to sell KCUL-FM to AM 1410 KZEY owner, RCA Broadcasting, LLC., reuniting the former Marshall based AM/FM combo. After 14 years together, KCUL-FM broke simulcast with 92.1 KSYR "La Invasora". The following day, KCUL-FM went silent.

After a nine-month negotiation and lengthy closing, RCA closed on the sale of KCUL-FM October 1, 2019. As a result, 92.3 and 1410 were reunited under the sane owner once again.

On October 22, 2019, AM 1410 reacquired the KCUL call sign, and the KCUL-AM-FM Marshall radio combo was reunited. This would prove to be temporary, as on March 6, 2020, RCA filed to change KCUL-FM's call sign to KPRO, while still silent, after holding the KCUL-FM set for 28 years. The two stations then swapped call signs on May 27, 2020, putting KCUL (without the FM suffix) on 92.3 and KPRO on 1410.

=== Return to English programming ===
When KCUL 92.3 returned to broadcasting, it joined new sister station 1370 KFRO, becoming an affiliate of the Galaxy Nostalgia Network. KCUL aired the Galaxy Moonbeam Nitesite, a program of over 300 shows, which targets baby boomers. Galaxy is hosted by Gilbert Smith and Mike Bragg, and is an educational show that covers music, radio, television, movies, and historical events of the 20th century.

Effective October 2, 2020, RCA Broadcasting sold KCUL to 92.3 The Depot LLC., while the facility adopted a new call sign, KDPM-FM.

=== The Depot opens ===
KDPM, now known as "The Depot", began broadcasting live on October 19, 2020. KDPM is "the radio station that sounds like East Texas." The format is hybrid country/classic rock with an emphasis on music written or performed by Texans or is in some way connected with the State of Texas. The Depot sound was created by nationally recognized program director "Chip" Arledge, AKA "The Fat Man." KDPM is different than a vast majority of American radio stations in that it airs no syndicated or satellite-delivered programming at all. The format is custom-designed for the area through its use of prominent musicians from the region and state, historic audio soundbites from nationally-known figures with roots in the area and other programming elements endemic to The Depot's coverage area. The Depot also partners with the East Texas Performing Arts Association to produce The Texas Sounds International Country Music Awards Competition each October.

=== The Depot receives recognition and awards ===
In only a short time since the station has been owned by 92-3 The Depot LLC and the launch of its current incarnation the station has been widely recognized and praised for its public service and community efforts by a number of organizations including the Texas Association of Broadcasters which made special note of the station's public response to an incident wherein a local Hispanic restauranteur was assaulted for speaking in his native language at a local eatery. The Depot's morning show host "The Fat Man" is well known for his advocacy of helping the area move forward culturally and economically and undertaking, supporting and producing a myriad of events including the annual "Shop With a Cop" event wherein dozens of children receive assistance with buying holiday presents for their families each December, the downtown Marshall "Boogie on the Bricks" musical event and many others. Additionally, 92-3 The Depot was awarded the Texas Association of Broadcasters 2023 Jason Hightower Award for Broadcast Excellence for outstanding community service.
