= KKUS =

Radio station in Tyler, Texas

- Tyler, Texas; United States
- Broadcast area: Tyler-Longview area
- Frequency: 104.1 MHz
- Branding: 104-1, 103-7 The Ranch

Programming
- Language: English
- Format: Classic country
- Affiliations: Compass Media Networks

Ownership
- Owner: Connoisseur Media; (Connoisseur Media, LLC.)
- Sister stations: KTLH; KOOI; KOYE; KYKX

History
- First air date: December 7, 1989
- Former call signs: KGKB (1989–1990); KTMJ (1990–1992)
- Call sign meaning: "US 104" (former branding)

Technical information
- Licensing authority: FCC
- Facility ID: 68651
- Class: C2
- ERP: 50,000 watts
- HAAT: 150.0 meters (492.1 ft)
- Transmitter coordinates: 32°29′33″N 95°28′52″W
- Repeater: 105.7 KYKX-HD2 (Longview)

Links
- Public license information: Public file; LMS
- Webcast: Listen live
- Website: theranch.fm

KKUS (104.1 FM, "The Ranch") is a radio station licensed to Tyler, Texas, United States. Owned by Connoisseur Media, it carries a classic country format, with studios in downtown Tyler and transmitter sited in Hideaway. In addition to a standard analog transmission, KKUS is relayed over low-power FM translator K279CI (103.7 FM) and the second HD subchannel of KYKX.

== History ==
December 7, 1989, 104.1 signed on the air as KGKB Tyler. The original licensee of 104.1 was radio executive Rick Reynolds. On April 16, 1990, the station changed its call sign to KTMJ and switched to a "Magic" format. October 1, 1992, 104.1 changed to the current KKUS, and became "US 104" playing top-40 country, in an effort to compete with KNUE and KYKX. In 1998, KKUS was sold to Sun Group of Dallas, which in turn became Sunburst. In 2000, KKUS along with KYKX, KFRO, and KFRO-FM was sold to Waller Media of Jacksonville. Dudley Waller and Rick Guest (former GM of Waller Broadcasting) changed the format to the now highly successful classic country format. Waller and Guest added Tom Perryman, and by adding Tom turned 104.1 into one of the most successful stations in East Texas. On January 7, 2005, Waller sold KKUS, KOOI, KOYE, KYKX, and KFRO to Access.1 of New York/East Texas Radio Group.

Alpha Media LLC purchased KKUS and eight other stations in Texas and Louisiana from Access.1 effective April 14, 2015, at a price of $13.75 million.

Tom Perryman was East Texas' only true radio legend. In the late 1940s, Tom started his career at 1400 KEBE "The KEBE Corral" in Jacksonville, Texas. In the mid-1950s, Tom was at KSIJ (now KEES) 1430 in Gladewater, Texas. It was at KSIJ that Tom brought Elvis Presley to East Texas, and gave Elvis some of his first work. It was also at KSIJ that Tom met Jim Reeves, Floyd Cramer, and Johnny Horton. Then Tom went on to host the Opry Star Spotlight on The Air Castle of the South 650 WSM in Nashville, as well as becoming one of the most famous Opry announcers of all time. Before leaving WSM he hired his replacement, Ralph Emery. Tom and Jim Reeves then bought KGRI AM/FM in Henderson, Texas. Later, Tom and Mary Reeves bought WMTS AM/FM in Murfreesboro, TN. The Perryman's and Mary Reeves sold WMTS AM/FM in the early 1980s, and Tom went into retirement. Tom was convinced to come back to East Texas by Dudley Waller (former owner of KKUS) and Rick Guest (former GM of Waller and Access.1/East Texas Radio Group), to boost the ratings of the fledgling classic country station (The Ranch). Tom agreed to join the Ranch, and kept "The Ranch" consistently at the top of the ratings. He died January 11, 2018.
