= KOYE =

Radio station in Frankston, Texas

- Frankston, Texas; United States
- Broadcast area: Tyler-Longview
- Frequency: 96.7 MHz
- Branding: La Invasora 96.7 y 107.9

Programming
- Language: Spanish
- Format: Regional Mexican

Ownership
- Owner: Connoisseur Media; (Connoisseur Media, LLC.)
- Sister stations: KOOI; KKUS; KYKX; KTLH

History
- First air date: August 13, 1970 (as 94.3 KLIS Palestine, Texas)
- Former call signs: KLIS (1970–2001)
- Former frequencies: 94.3 MHz (1970–2001)
- Call sign meaning: OYE translates to "listen" in Spanish

Technical information
- Licensing authority: FCC
- Facility ID: 70387
- Class: C2
- ERP: 50,000 watts
- HAAT: 150 meters (490 ft)
- Transmitter coordinates: 32°2′22.00″N 95°24′39.00″W
- Repeater: 107.9 KTLH (Hallsville)

Links
- Public license information: Public file; LMS
- Webcast: Listen Live
- Website: lainvasora.fm

KOYE (96.7 FM) is a Connoisseur Media radio station, licensed to Frankston, Texas, United States, serving the Tyler-Longview market with a regional Mexican format in full simulcast with sister station KTLH Hallsville. KOYE's signal covers the western half of the Tyler-Longview market. Studios are located on Broadway Avenue in downtown Tyler; the transmitter site is located northwest of Jacksonville, Texas.

== History ==
The facility was first licensed by the FCC on August 13, 1970 @ 94.3 MHz in Palestine, Texas. With an initial ERP of 3 kilowatts, it was originally owned by Vista Broadcasting Company, Inc.

By the late 1990s, KLIS was broadcasting on 96.7 MHz while still licensed to Palestine, Texas. The station featured a Classic Rock format by the name of "Texas Rock 96.7." The station moved its transmission location and COL to Frankston as KOYE effective April 1, 2001. On April 17, 2001, the station briefly returned its call sign to KLIS, and on May 7, 2001, back to the current KOYE. It was at this time when the station flipped to a Regional Mexican format as "K-Oye." It was the first full-time Spanish language FM station in the Tyler/Longview radio market.

In October 2003, KOYE added a simulcast on KFRO-FM 95.3 to improve coverage of the Longview area. With the addition of the simulcast, KOYE and KFRO-FM reimaged as "La Super Invasora." This was the first of four different stations that simulcasted KOYE to cover the Longview area. The KFRO-FM simulcast lasted until April 2004 when Waller Media began operating KXAL 100.3 by an LMA. The simulcast was transferred to KXAL while KFRO-FM returned to oldies. On January 7, 2005, Waller Media sold KOYE to Access 1 Communications. Due to the change in ownership, the KXAL simulcast was dropped and replaced by a simulcast on the new sister station KCUL 92.3, licensed to Marshall. Eventually KOYE became known as "La Invasora." The station name "La Invasora" translates in English to "The Invader." ".

Access 1 launched the same "La Invasora" format on 92.1 KSYR in Shreveport. Since Marshall is part of the Shreveport radio market, Access 1 decided to switch KCUL to a simulcast of KSYR. KOYE would go without a simulcast until February 19, 2020 when KTLH 107.9 signed on.
