= Longview, Texas =

- City
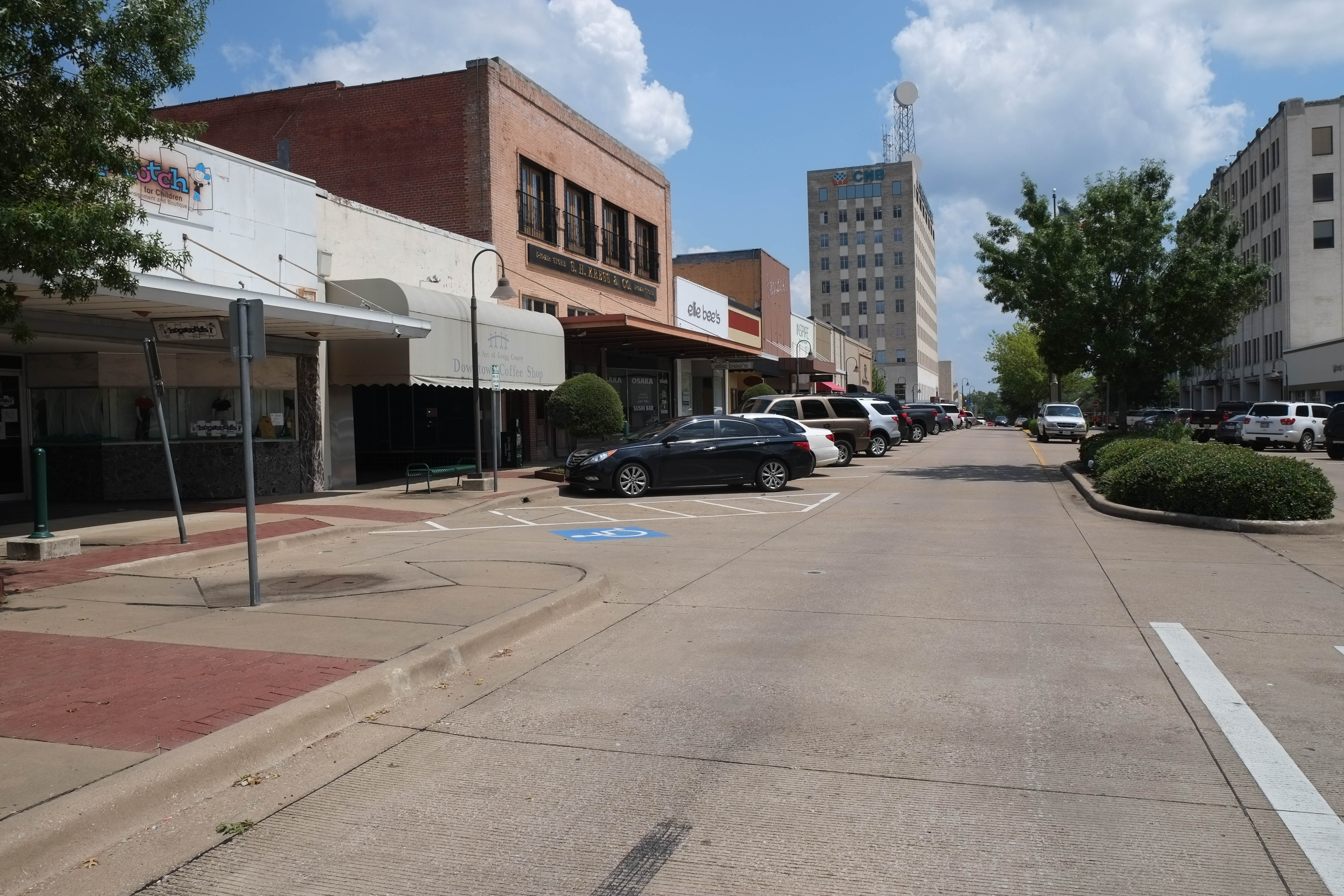
- Downtown Longview

- Flag
- Nickname: Balloon Race Capital of Texas
- Motto: Real East Texas
- Interactive map of Longview, Texas
- Location within Texas Location within the United States
- Coordinates: 32.5202°N 94.7611°W
- Country: United States
- State: Texas
- Counties: Gregg, Harrison
- Founded: 1870
- Incorporated: May 17, 1871
- Founder: Ossamus Hitch Methvin, Sr.

Government
  - Type: Council–manager
  - Mayor: Kristen Ishihara (Term Ends May 2027)
  - City manager: Rolin C. McPhee

Area
  - City: 56.327 sq mi (145.886 km^{2})
  - Land: 56.227 sq mi (145.628 km^{2})
  - Water: 0.010 sq mi (0.026 km^{2}) 0.18%
- Elevation: 289 ft (88 m)

Population (2020)
  - City: 81,638
  - Estimate (2024): 83,668
  - Rank: US: 436th TX: 50th
  - Density: 1,451.9/sq mi (560.59/km^{2})
  - Urban: 107,099 (US: 303rd)
  - Metro: 297,315 (US: 173rd)
- Demonym: Longviewite
- Time zone: UTC−6 (Central (CST))
  - Summer (DST): UTC−5 (CDT)
- ZIP Codes: 75601–75608, 75615
- Area code(s): 903 and 430
- FIPS code: 48-43888
- GNIS feature ID: 2410870
- Website: longviewtexas.gov

Longview is a city in and the county seat of Gregg County, Texas, United States. Longview is located in East Texas, where Interstate 20 and U.S. Highways 80 and 259 converge just north of the Sabine River. Its population was 81,638 as of the 2020 census, and was estimated at 83,668 in 2024. Longview is the principal city of the Longview metropolitan statistical area, comprising Gregg, Upshur, and Rusk Counties. The population of the metropolitan area as of 2025 census estimates was 297,315.

Longview was established in 1870 in what was at the time southern Upshur County; the town incorporated on May 17, 1871. After Gregg County was created on May 7, 1873, and organized on June 28, 1873, Longview was voted the county seat. Today, Longview is considered a major hub city for the region, as is the nearby city of Tyler. Companies with a significant presence in Longview include Eastman Chemical, Trinity Rail Group, AAON Coil Products, Komatsu Mining, Dollar General, and Old Navy/GAP. Colleges and universities in the area include LeTourneau University, Kilgore College, and the University of Texas at Tyler's Longview University Center.

== History ==
The modern-day city of Longview was founded in 1869. In 1870, O.H. Methvin, Sr., sold 100 acres (40 ha) to the Southern Pacific Railroad (later the Texas and Pacific Railway) for one dollar to persuade them to build their line in the direction of land he owned. Later that year, he sold another 100 acres (40 ha) for $500 in gold. He hoped the coming of the railroad would increase the value of the rest of his land.

Two railroad surveyors coined the name of the town when they stated, "What a long view!" from the porch of Methvin's home. In June 1871, Longview was incorporated as the first town in Gregg County.

In 1884, the Mobberly Hotel opened for business servicing railroad travelers and as the center of social gatherings for Longview. The hotel featured cherrywood furniture with carved bedposts, marble-top washstands, linen tablecloths, electric crystal chandeliers, and a fireplace in every room. Mobberly was located in the junction part of town near the train depot. The hotel was destroyed by fire on June 13, 1965.

On May 23, 1894, Bill Dalton and three members of his posse robbed the First National Bank of Longview. Several men died in the resulting gunfight, bandit Jim Wallace along with citizens J. W. McQueen, Charles Learn, and George Buckingham. The robbers escaped with $2,000 in cash and some unsigned bank notes. The Gregg County Historical Museum holds its exhibit on the event within the bank vault that was robbed and holds a yearly event to mark the anniversary of the occasion.

In the Longview race riot in July 1919, a reporter for The Chicago Defender was in Longview looking into the mysterious death of a black man named Lemuel Walters. An armed white mob attacked a home where the reporter, S.L. Jones, was staying and attempted to batter their way in. A gunfight began between the attackers and the men in the house. Eventually, Jones made a getaway. The white men then began to burn buildings in the black section of the town.

The Gregg Hotel, whiich opened in 1930, served oil-boom customers. It had various operators as a hotel until 1978, when it was converted to dormitories for use by male students of LeTourneau College. Following the 1984 spring semester, the building sat empty except for a barbershop, which then closed in 1986. The building was ultimately demolished in 1995.

In 1942, construction began on the Big Inch pipeline in Longview. From 1943 to 1945, the pipeline transported over 261,000,000 barrels of crude oil to the East Coast. At the time of construction, Big Inch and its smaller version, Little Inch, comprised the longest petroleum pipeline ever built in the world. Both were integral in supplying the United States' war effort in World War II.

After World War II, Longview's population grew from 24,502 to 40,050 in 1960, its growth fueled by migration from rural Gregg County and the annexation of Greggton and Spring Hill.

== Geography ==
According to the United States Census Bureau, the city has a total area of 56.33 square miles (145.9 km^{2}), of which 0.10 square miles (0.26 km^{2}) (0.18% or 64 ac) is covered by water.

Longview is located within Northeast Texas, a subregion of East Texas. North of Kilgore, it is bordered to the west by the city of White Oak. Longview was founded in Gregg County and has annexed surrounding land as it has grown in population and area, including a comparatively small area on its east that is within Harrison County.

=== Climate ===
Climate data for Longview, Texas (1991–2020 normals, extremes 1902–present)
Month	Jan	Feb	Mar	Apr	May	Jun	Jul	Aug	Sep	Oct	Nov	Dec	Year
Record high °F (°C)	86 (30)	90 (32)	97 (36)	95 (35)	103 (39)	110 (43)	108 (42)	113 (45)	109 (43)	101 (38)	93 (34)	93 (34)	113 (45)
Mean daily maximum °F (°C)	57.6 (14.2)	62.0 (16.7)	69.5 (20.8)	76.7 (24.8)	83.9 (28.8)	90.2 (32.3)	93.6 (34.2)	94.2 (34.6)	88.8 (31.6)	79.0 (26.1)	67.9 (19.9)	59.5 (15.3)	76.9 (24.9)
Daily mean °F (°C)	46.0 (7.8)	49.8 (9.9)	57.2 (14.0)	64.2 (17.9)	72.8 (22.7)	79.8 (26.6)	83.0 (28.3)	83.0 (28.3)	76.9 (24.9)	66.2 (19.0)	55.4 (13.0)	47.8 (8.8)	65.2 (18.4)
Mean daily minimum °F (°C)	34.3 (1.3)	37.7 (3.2)	44.9 (7.2)	51.8 (11.0)	61.7 (16.5)	69.5 (20.8)	72.5 (22.5)	71.7 (22.1)	64.9 (18.3)	53.3 (11.8)	43.0 (6.1)	36.2 (2.3)	53.5 (11.9)
Record low °F (°C)	−4 (−20)	−5 (−21)	17 (−8)	20 (−7)	37 (3)	52 (11)	56 (13)	53 (12)	38 (3)	25 (−4)	18 (−8)	2 (−17)	−5 (−21)
Average precipitation inches (mm)	4.27 (108)	4.07 (103)	4.68 (119)	4.34 (110)	4.92 (125)	4.33 (110)	2.50 (64)	2.84 (72)	3.48 (88)	4.33 (110)	3.78 (96)	4.64 (118)	48.18 (1,224)
Average snowfall inches (cm)	0.4 (1.0)	0.3 (0.76)	0.0 (0.0)	0.0 (0.0)	0.0 (0.0)	0.0 (0.0)	0.0 (0.0)	0.0 (0.0)	0.0 (0.0)	0.0 (0.0)	0.0 (0.0)	0.0 (0.0)	0.7 (1.8)
Average precipitation days (≥ 0.01 in)	8.5	8.8	8.8	7.3	8.0	7.3	5.5	5.8	5.7	6.7	7.4	9.0	88.8
Average snowy days (≥ 0.1 in)	0.2	0.2	0.0	0.0	0.0	0.0	0.0	0.0	0.0	0.0	0.0	0.0	0.4
Source: NOAA

== Demographics ==
Historical population
Census	Pop.	Note	%±
1880	1,525		—
1890	2,034		33.4%
1900	3,591		76.5%
1910	5,155		43.6%
1920	5,713		10.8%
1930	5,036		−11.9%
1940	13,758		173.2%
1950	24,502		78.1%
1960	40,050		63.5%
1970	45,547		13.7%
1980	62,762		37.8%
1990	70,311		12.0%
2000	73,344		4.3%
2010	80,455		9.7%
2020	81,638		1.5%
2024 (est.)	83,668		2.5%
U.S. Decennial Census; 2020 Census

According to realtor website Zillow, the average price of a home as of March 31, 2026, in Longview was $230,973.

As of the 2024 American Community Survey, an estimated 33,947 households were in Longview, with an average of 2.35 persons per household. The city has a median household income of $57,259. About 17.7% of the city's population lived at or below the poverty line. Longview had an estimated 59.8% employment rate, with 28.3% of the population holding a bachelor's degree or higher and 89.9% holding a high-school diploma. The 36,026 housing units had an average density of 640.72 per square mile (247.4/km^{2}).

The median age in the city was 34.5 years.

Longview, Texas – racial and ethnic composition Note: the US Census treats Hispanic/Latino as an ethnic category. This table excludes Latinos from the racial categories and assigns them to a separate category. Hispanics/Latinos may be of any race.
Race / ethnicity (NH = non-Hispanic)	Pop. 1980	Pop. 1990	Pop. 2000	Pop. 2010	Pop. 2020
White alone (NH)	48,498 (77.27%)	52,767 (75.05%)	48,028 (65.48%)	45,230 (56.22%)	40,599 (49.73%)
Black or African American alone (NH)	11,961 (19.06%)	13,912 (19.79%)	16,126 (21.99%)	18,190 (22.61%)	19,173 (23.49%)
Native American or Alaska Native alone (NH)	259 (0.41%)	293 (0.42%)	267 (0.36%)	292 (0.36%)	255 (0.31%)
Asian alone (NH)	595 (0.95%)	406 (0.58%)	606 (0.83%)	1,063 (1.32%)	1,309 (1.60%)
Pacific Islander alone (NH)	—	—	12 (0.02%)	21 (0.03%)	30 (0.04%)
Other race alone (NH)	11 (0.02%)	37 (0.05%)	35 (0.05%)	87 (0.11%)	219 (0.27%)
Multiracial (NH)	—	—	706 (0.96%)	1,112 (1.38%)	3,115 (3.82%)
Hispanic or Latino (any race)	1,438 (2.29%)	2,896 (4.12%)	7,564 (10.31%)	14,460 (17.97%)	16,938 (20.75%)
Total	62,762 (100.00%)	70,311 (100.00%)	73,344 (100.00%)	80,455 (100.00%)	81,638 (100.00%)

=== 2020 census ===
As of the 2020 census, 81,638 people, 31,798 households, and 20,306 families resided in the city. The population density was 1,462.34 inhabitants per square mile (564.6/km^{2}). The 35,059 housing units had an average density of 627.99 per square mile (242.5/km^{2}). The racial makeup of the city was 54.19% White, 23.75% African American, 0.63% Native American, 1.63% Asian, 0.05% Pacific Islander, 10.19% from some other races, and 9.56% from two or more races. Hispanic or Latino people of any race were 20.75% of the population.

Of the 31,798 households, 32.2% had children under 18 living with them, 41.4% were married couples living together, 33.4% had a female householder with no husband present, 19.0% had a male householder and no spouse or partner present, 30.4% were made up of individuals, and 12.4% had someone living alone who was 65 or older. The median age was 36.7 years. For every 100 females, there were 92.6 males. For every 100 females 18 and over, there were 88.6 males.

Almost all of the residents lived in urban areas, while 0.3% lived in rural areas.

The city had 35,059 housing units, of which 9.3% were vacant. The homeowner vacancy rate was 2.2% and the rental vacancy rate was 10.4%.

=== 2010 census ===
As of the 2010 census, 80,455 people, 30,562 households, and 20,020 families were residing in the city. The population density was 1,444.62 inhabitants per square mile (557.8/km^{2}). The 32,751 housing units had an average density of 588.06 per square mile (227.1/km^{2}). The racial makeup of the city was 63.32% White, 22.94% African American, 0.54% Native American, 1.35% Asian, 0.05% Pacific Islander, 9.49% from some other race, and 2.31% from two or more races. Hispanics or Latinos of any race were 17.97% of the population.

=== 2000 census ===
As of the 2000 census, 73,344 people, 28,363 households, and 19,116 families lived in the city. The population density was 1,341.82 inhabitants per square mile (518.1/km^{2}). The 30,726 housing units hsd an average density of 562.13 per square mile (217.0/km^{2}). The racial makeup of the city was 70.10% White, 22.11% African American, 0.50% Native American, 0.83% Asian, 4.94% from some other race, and 1.51% from two or more races. Hispanic or Latino people of any race were 10.31% of the population.

Of the 28,363 households, 33.2% have children under 18 living with them, 48.9% were married couples living together, 14.5% had a female householder with no husband present, and 32.6% were not families. About 27.9% of all households were made up of individuals, and 10.7% have someone living alone who was 65 or older. The average household size was 2.50, and the average family size was 3.06.

In the city, the age distribution was 26.7% under 18, 10.8% from 18 to 24, 28.7% from 25 to 44, 20.4% from 45 to 64, and 13.3% who were 65 or older. The median age was 34 years. For every 100 females, there were 93.0 males. For every 100 females 18 and over, there were 89.4 males.

The median income in the city for a household was $33,858 and for a family was $42,378. Males had a median income of $33,078 versus $21,400 for females. The per capita income for the city was $18,768. About 16.0% of the population and 13.0% of families were below the poverty line, of which 22.7% were under 18 and 10.6% were 65 or older.

=== Religion ===
As of 2020's religion census by the Association of Religion Data Archives, Baptists were the largest sect of Christians, with Christianity being the predominant religion for Longview's metropolitan area. Altogether, Baptists from the American Baptist Association, Full Gospel Baptist Church Fellowship, Free Will Baptists, National Baptists, National Missionary Baptists, and Southern Baptists numbered 88,811. Non- or interdenominational Protestants numbered 26,874. Other large Christian communities for the MSA were Methodists, Pentecostals, Jehovah's Witnesses, and Mormons. Its Catholic Christian community numbered 22,952.

== Economy ==
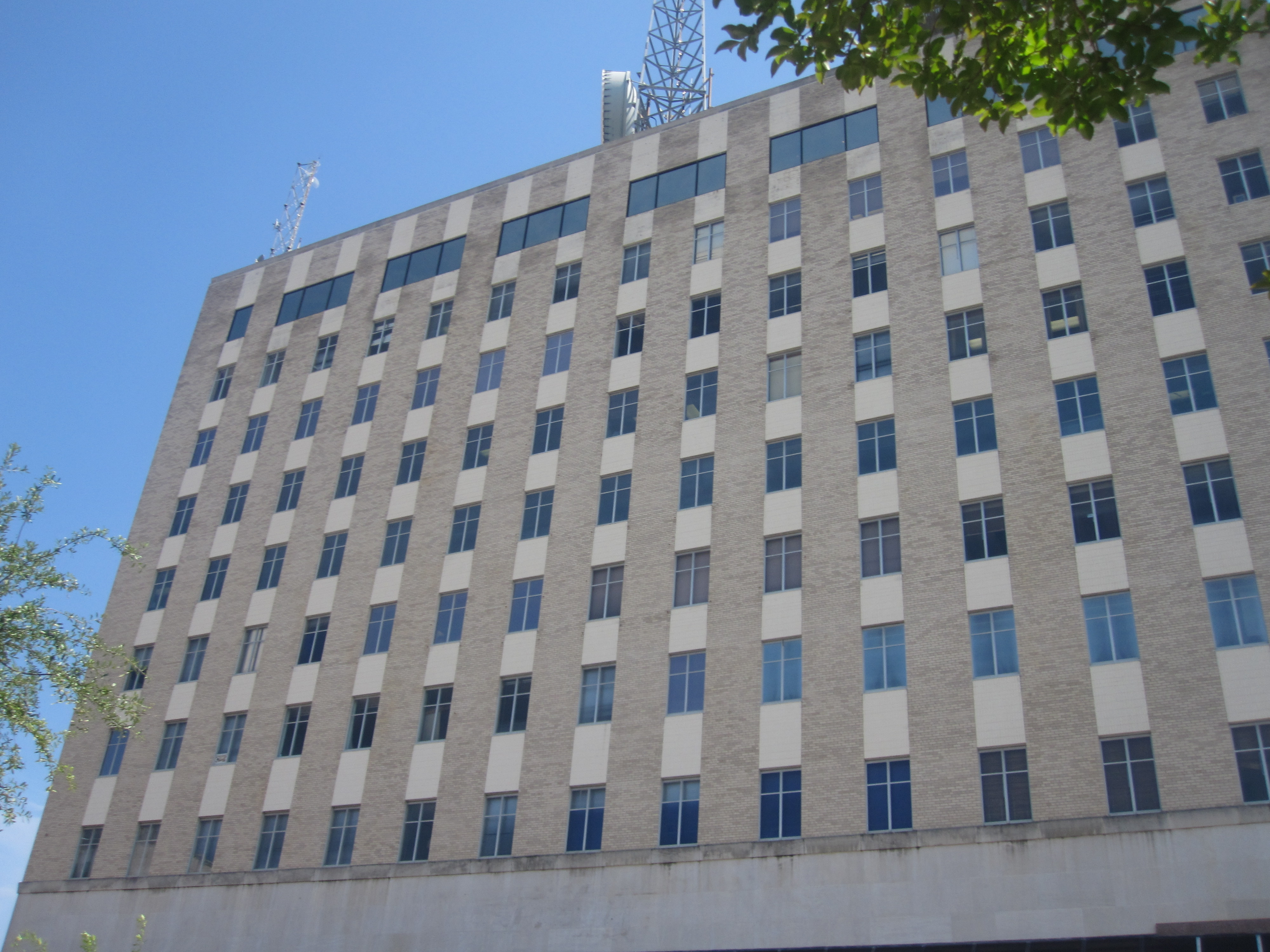
Longview's tallest building, the 10-story VeraBank

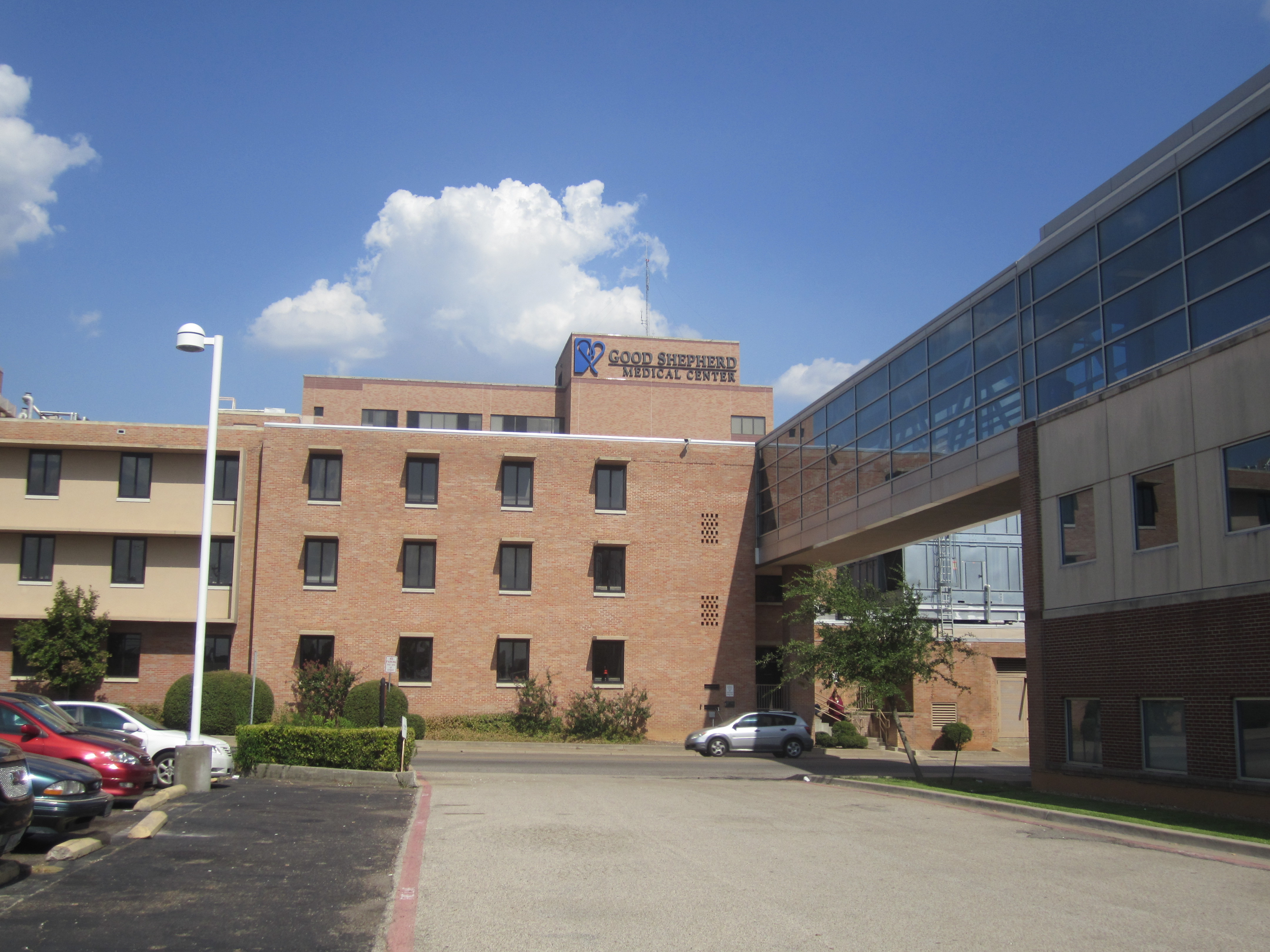
Christus Good Shepherd Medical Center

Looking west on Tyler Street in downtown Longview

Longview is one of several cities in East Texas that serve as a center for the "patent troll" industry, due to a perception that the United States District Court for the Eastern District of Texas is a favorable venue for patent infringement plaintiffs. As such, it is also one of the major economic hubs for Northeast Texas alongside Tyler.

=== Top employers ===
According to the city's 2024–2025 Annual Comprehensive Financial Report, the largest employers in the city are:

Rank	Employer	Number of employees	Percentage
1	Christus Good Shepherd Medical Center	3,000	3.27%
2	Eastman Chemical	1,510	1.64%
3	Longview Regional Medical Center	1,393	1.52%
4	Dollar General	762	0.83%
5	Komatsu	675	0.73%
6	AAON Coil Products, Inc.	613	0.67%
7	Gap, Inc.	555	0.60%
8	Trinity Rail, LLC	450	0.49%
9	Kito-Crosby Group	400	0.44%
10	Diagnostic Clinic of Longview	350	0.38%
—	Total employers	9,708	10.57%

== Arts and culture ==
Longview Public Library operates a main branch and the Broughton Branch.

Longview's cultural district—a 320-acre (130 ha) area in downtown Longview, which includes museums, restaurants, parks, live music, theater, and historic buildings—was designated by the Texas Commission on the Arts in 2019.

The 29-acre (12 ha) Longview Arboretum and Nature Center opened in 2019. Among other centers, the city has a vast trail system that is being connected to create 10 consecutive miles of connected walking/biking trails.

=== Juneteenth ===
Juneteenth, also known as Freedom Day, has been an annual celebration of the emancipation of African Americans from slavery in Longview since 1985.

Year	Highlights
1985	The City of Longview held its first official Juneteenth parade, marking the start of an annual tradition.
2024	The Real Cowboy Association hosted its Annual Juneteenth Rodeo at the Longview Fairgrounds Rodeo Arena on June 29, featuring rodeo competitions and educational scholarship fundraising.
2025	City-sponsored festivities on June 14 included a parade along Martin Luther King Jr. Blvd, a festival at Broughton Park with food, music, children’s activities, historical information sessions, and a business expo. On June 19, Juneteenth in the Park was held at Teague Park.
2025	The 40‑year anniversary of Longview’s Juneteenth parade

== Government ==
=== Local government ===
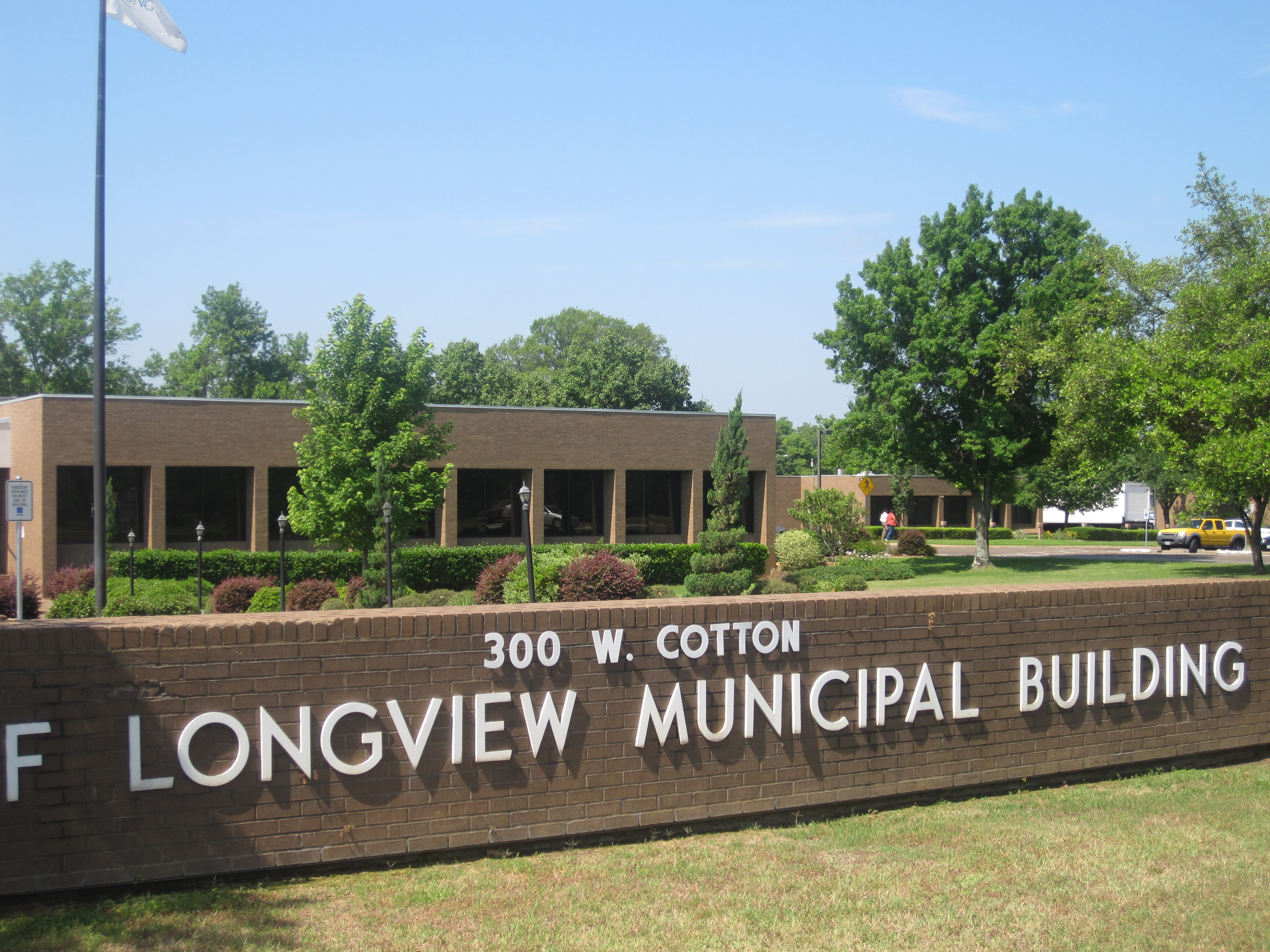
Longview Municipal Building

The city manager as of 2023 is Rolin McPhee. Bonds retired January 31, 2022 and Rolin McPhee became the city manager on February 1. With the addition of McPhee as city manager, the city of Longview underwent some restructuring namely adding an assistant city manager, MaryAnn Hagenbucher.

=== State government ===
Longview is represented in the Texas Senate by Republican Bryan Hughes, District 1, and in the Texas House of Representatives by Republican Jay Dean, District 7. The Texas Department of Criminal Justice operates the Longview District Parole Office in Longview.

=== Federal government ===
Longview is part of Texas's 1st congressional district, which is currently represented by Republican Nathaniel Moran. Moran was elected after former Republican Louie Gohmert announced he was not seeking reelection in 2022.

== Education ==
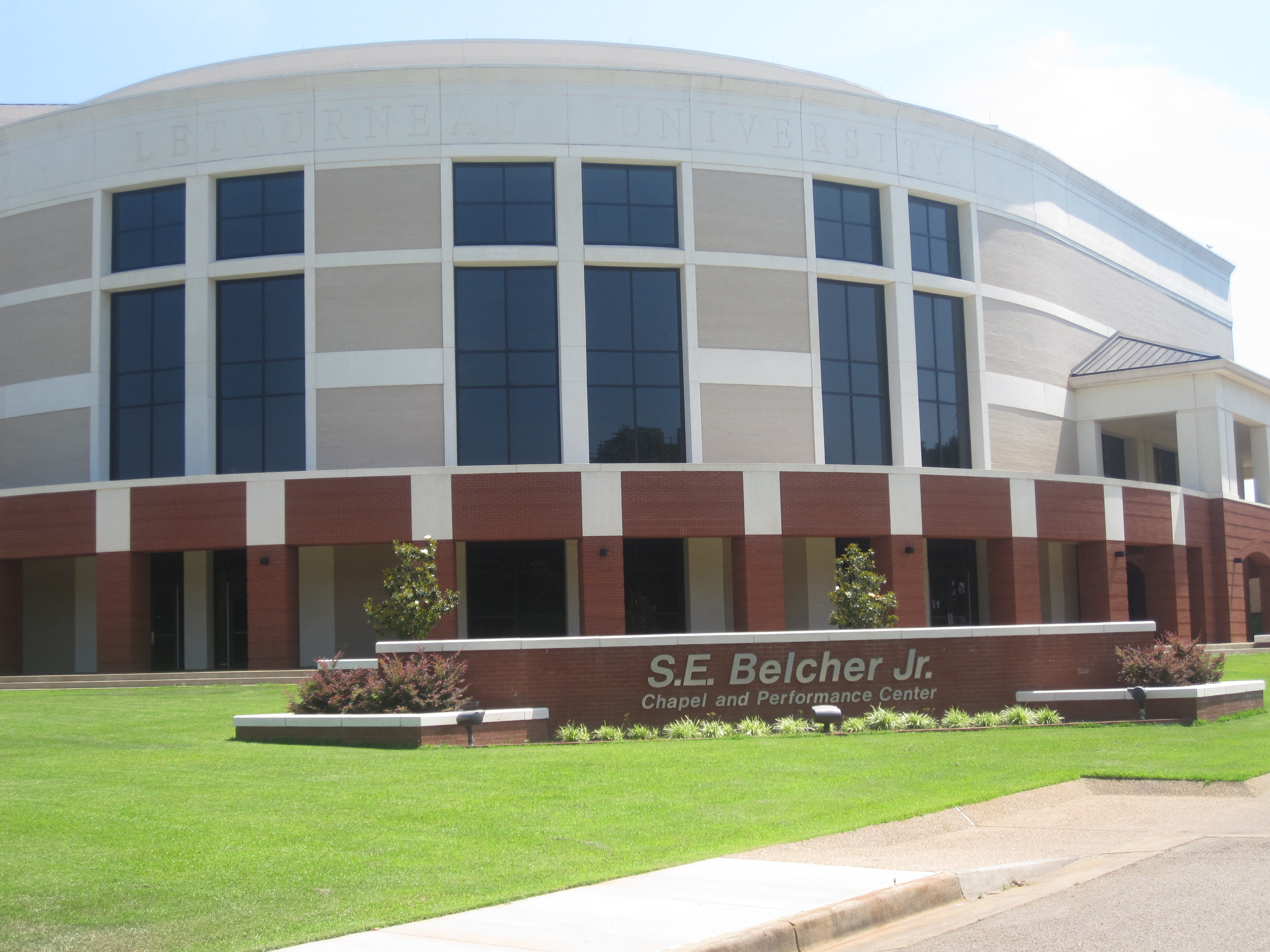
S.E. Belcher, Jr. Chapel and Performance Center at LeTourneau University

=== Colleges and universities ===
The city of Longview is home to three institutions of higher learning and two trade (cosmetology) schools:

- LeTourneau University
- Kilgore College, Longview Campus
- University of Texas at Tyler, Longview University Center

The service area of Kilgore College includes the independent school districts of Longview, Hallsville, Pine Tree, and Spring Hill (the ones covering sections of Longview).

=== Public school districts ===
Longview is served by four school districts.

The following include portions in Gregg County:

- Longview Independent School District – enrollment 8,150, 16 schools, home of the Lobos (Spanish for "Wolves"), serves south and northeast Longview
- Pine Tree Independent School District – enrollment 4,424, seven schools, home of the Pirates, serves west Longview including Pine Tree and Greggton
- Spring Hill Independent School District – enrollment 1,862, five schools, home of the Panthers, serves north Longview in the Spring Hill area

The Harrison County portion is in this school district:

- Hallsville Independent School District – enrollment 4,037, six schools, home of the Bobcats, serves far east Longview in Harrison County

== Media ==
=== TV stations ===
The Gregg County portion of Longview is part of the Tyler-Longview-Lufkin-Nacogdoches designated market area, and the Harrison County portion of Longview is within the Shreveport-Texarkana market.

KLGV-LD broadcasts from Longview.

=== Newspaper ===
- Longview News-Journal
- East Texas Review
- El Diario de Harrison County

=== Radio ===
==== FM stations ====
Frequency (MHz)	Call letters	Licensed location	Type	Format
94.1	K231DK	Longview	Translator of KFRO	Classic Hits
96.5	K243CU	Longview	Translator of KEES	Catholic
97.1	K246CB	Longview	Translator of KHCB	Christian radio
99.9	K260CE	Longview	Translator of KTAA	Christian radio
101.9	K270AW	Longview	Translator of KDOK	Classic Hits
103.7	K279CI	Longview	Translator of KYKX	Country
105.7	KYKX	Longview	Primary	Country

==== AM station ====
Frequency (kHz)	Call letters	Licensed location	Type	Format
1370	KFRO	Longview	Primary	Classic Hits

== Infrastructure ==
=== Transportation ===
==== Airport ====
East Texas Regional Airport is located south of Longview.

==== Public transportation ====
The city's public transit system, Longview Transit, runs daily routes, excluding Sundays and holidays. Its fixed routes provide transportation to key districts throughout the city.

The City of Longview Transit provides demand-response transportation services for those who are unable to use the regular Longview Transit fixed-route service.

==== Rail service ====
Amtrak passenger rail service is available on the Texas Eagle through a downtown terminal. Longview's Amtrak station is the fifth-busiest in Texas and the fourth-busiest station along the Texas Eagle route. Daily trains between Chicago and San Antonio stop each morning (Chicago–San Antonio) and each evening (San Antonio–Chicago). Monday, Wednesday, and Friday, the Longview station serves the Chicago to Los Angeles trains. The return train, Los Angeles to Chicago, stops in Longview on Sunday, Tuesday, and Friday. It serves about 20–50 passengers per day. From the station, passengers can connect to Nacogdoches, Lufkin, Houston, and Galveston, as well as Shreveport, Louisiana, by motorcoach. A proposal is in the works for a high-speed rail system from Dallas/Fort Worth to Shreveport along the I-20 corridor, bringing passenger rail service to that corridor for the first time since the Texas and Pacific's unnamed successor to the Louisiana Eagle in the late 1960s.

Longview is served by Amtrak, the BNSF Railway, and the Union Pacific Railroad.

==== Roads ====
- I-20, Interstate 20, an east–west freeway, connects Longview to Dallas, about 125 mi (201 km) to the west and to Shreveport, Louisiana, around 60 mi (97 km) to the east.
- US 80, U.S. Highway 80 runs through the central district of Longview. U.S. Hwy 80 was once a coast-to-coast highway from Tybee Beach near Savannah, Georgia, and ran continuously across the southern part of the United States to San Diego, California. Today, its western terminus is in Dallas, making the length only 1,032 mi (1,661 km). The western part of the route was replaced by I-20 and I-10.
- US 259, U.S. Highway 259 is a 250-mile-long (400 km) north/south highway providing an alternate route to U.S. 59 between Nacogdoches, Texas, and the Oklahoma/Arkansas border just south of Fort Smith, Arkansas. Before Interstate 20, US 259 went through the center of Longview on a route now designated Texas State Highway 31 and Spur 502.
- SH 31, Texas Highway 31 runs 143.3 miles (230.6 km) east/west between Longview and Waco, Texas.
- SH 149, Texas Highway 149, 33.9 mi (54.6 km) long, connects Longview with Carthage.
- SH 300, Texas Highway 300 is a short (18.62-mile (29.97 km)) highway connecting Longview to U.S. 271 in Gilmer.
- SH 281, Texas Highway 281 is a 19.3-mile (31.1 km) loop highway that circumnavigates much of Longview from its east connection at I-20 east of the Gregg/Harrison County line to I-20 in Longview. It runs northward, westward, southward, and eastward around the city.
- Spur 502, Spur 502 connects north/south traffic between U.S. Hwy 80 in central Longview and U.S. Hwy 259 north of Longview.
- Spur 63, Spur 63 runs north/south through Longview connecting TX Hwy 31 at its Longview terminus with Spur 502 north of TX Loop 281.

== Notable people ==
- Greg Abbott, three-term Governor of Texas, spent early childhood in Longview
- Jeb Blount, football player with Oakland Raiders and Tampa Bay Buccaneers, won Super Bowl XI
- Ethan Bryant, soccer player
- Shawn Byrdsong, football player
- Frank Steen, American football End
- Rodney Carrington, comedian, actor, and writer
- Robert Alan Cashell, businessman, former Lieutenant Governor of Nevada, three-term Mayor of Reno, Nevada
- Mary Lou Clements-Mann, HIV/AIDS researcher killed on Swissair Flight 111
- Chris Davis, professional baseball player for the Baltimore Orioles
- Jay Dean, mayor of Longview, 2005-2015; Republican state representative for Texas District 7
- Benji Flowers, soccer player
- Clint Ford, actor and writer
- John Lee Hancock, director and screenwriter
- JaMycal Hasty, professional football player for the Jacksonville Jaguars
- Kristy Hawkins, IFBB professional bodybuilder
- Robert Henson, professional football player for the Washington Redskins
- Christopher Hinn, miller and Wisconsin State Assemblyman
- Evonne Hsu, professional singer in Taiwan
- Madison Hu, actor, born in Longview
- Michael Huey, professional football player
- Chris Ivory, former running back for the New York Jets
- Buford A. Johnson, chief mechanic for the Tuskegee Airmen
- Chris Johnson, NFL cornerback
- Montana Jordan, actor
- Malcolm Kelly, football player for the Washington Redskins
- Haynes King, college football player with the Georgia Tech Yellow Jackets
- Lee Lacy, professional baseball player, 1972–1987
- Miranda Lambert, country music artist, born in Longview
- Brandon Maxwell, fashion designer
- Matthew McConaughey, Oscar-winning actor
- Neal McCoy, country music singer
- Blaine Milam, Convicted child murderer executed by lethal injection
- Charlie Neal, professional baseball player, 1956–1963
- Robert Newhouse, professional football player, 1972–1983
- Diane Patrick, member of the Texas House of Representatives from Arlington; reared in Longview as Diane Porter
- Monte Pittman, singer, songwriter, guitarist for Madonna
- Josh Scobee, kicker for Jacksonville Jaguars
- James Scott, professional football player
- Justin Slaten, professional baseball player
- Warren Smith, rockabilly musician
- Ben Spies, American professional motorcycle racer
- James Street, college football and baseball player for the Texas Longhorns
- Jack Boynton Strong, Texas lawyer, businessman, and legislator
- Bobby Taylor, All-Pro cornerback for Philadelphia Eagles, 1995–2003; member of the Seattle Seahawks in 2004
- Sam West, professional baseball player, 1927–1942
- Forest Whitaker, Oscar-winning actor
- Trent Williams, All-Pro offensive lineman for the San Francisco 49ers
