= NextMedia Group =

Former American media company

- Company type: Private
- Industry: Media
- Founded: 1999; 26 years ago
- Defunct: 2014; 11 years ago
- Fate: Sold to Digity, LLC
- Headquarters: Greenwood Village, Colorado
- Products: Radio; Outdoor Advertising; Interactive Media

NextMedia Group was an out-of-home media company headquartered in Greenwood Village, Colorado. NextMedia owned and operated 33 AM and FM stations, 5,700 outdoor advertising display across several regions and markets, as well as an interactive division.

== History ==
NextMedia Group was established in 1999, and began acquiring stations a year later, notably from Pinnacle Broadcasting.

The company failed to offer shares to investors in 2003, and stopped reporting its quarterly financial reports to the Securities and Exchange Commission during the third quarter of 2003, at which time it reported a long term debt obligation of some $300 million; $200 million of long term debt was refinanced in 2006.

On January 1, 2004, NextMedia acquired outdoor displays in the Myrtle Beach, SC region from Clear Channel Outdoor in an asset exchange.

In July 2004, NextMedia Group purchased the Wilmington, NC stations WRQR, WAZO, and WMFD from Ocean Broadcasting, and WKXB and WSFM from Sea-Comm Inc.

Co-founder of the Company, Carl Hirsch, left in 2007 to become a founding partner of GoodRadio LLC based in West Palm Beach, FL. NextMedia Group was then owned by several private equity firms.

In 2008, NextMedia Group announced to sell Wilmington, NC stations to Capitol Broadcasting Company.

NextMedia Group filed for Chapter 11 bankruptcy protection on December 21, 2009, which transfers 95% of equity in the company to second-lien holders.

On May 27, 2010, NextMedia emerged from Chapter 11 bankruptcy protection.

In late 2012, NextMedia sold its outdoor advertising assets to Lamar Advertising Company, to focus on the core radio business.

On October 10, 2013, NextMedia Group announced all 33 of their radio stations, and presumably NextMedia 360, had been sold to Dean Goodman's Digity, LLC. The transaction was consummated on February 10, 2014, at a purchase price of $85 million.

== Former radio stations ==
Stations are listed by state and market below. Station self-designated titles are denoted in quotations where applicable followed by actual cities of license and format in parentheses followed by frequency and effective radiated power. For AM stations, both daytime and nighttime power are listed.

=== California ===
San Jose

- KBAY (San Jose, Adult Contemporary) - 94.5 MHz, 44 kW
- KEZR (San Jose, Hot Adult Contemporary) - 106.5 MHz, 42 kW

=== Illinois ===
Aurora

- WERV "95.9 The River" (Aurora, Classic Hits) - 95.9 MHz, 3 kW

Joliet

- WCCQ (Crest Hill, Country) - 98.3 MHz, 3 kW
- WJOL (Joliet, News/Talk/Sports) - 1340 kHz, 1/1 kW
- WSSR "Star 96.7" (Joliet, Hot AC) - 96.7 MHz, 3.5 kW
- WRXQ (Coal City, Classic Rock) - 100.7 MHz, 2.45 kW

Waukegan

- WKRS (ESPN DEPORTES 1220, Waukegan, Spanish Sports/Talk) - 1220 kHz, 1/0.09 kW
- WXLC (102.3 WXLC Waukegan, Hot AC) - 102.3 MHz, 3 kW

=== Michigan ===
Saginaw

- WCEN 94.5 the Moose www.945themoose.com (Hemlock, Country) - 94.5 MHz, 100 kW
- WGER Mix 106.3 www.mix1063fm.com (Saginaw, Hot Adult Contemporary)- 106.3 MHz, 4 kW
- WSGW NewsRadio 790 WSGW www.wsgw.com (Saginaw, News/Talk)- 790 kHz, 5/1 kW
- WSGW-FM Talk and Sports 100.5 www.fmtalk1005.com (Carrollton, News, Talk, Fox Sports)100.5 MHz, 3 kW
- WTLZ Hot 107 www.hotwtlz.com (Saginaw, Urban AC)107.1 MHz, 4.9 kW

=== North Carolina ===
New Bern

- WANG (Havelock, Standards) - 1330 kHz, 1/ kW

Jacksonville

- WQSL (Jacksonville, Country) - 92.3 MHz, 22.5 kW (WQSL and WQZL currently simulcast)
- WQZL (Belhaven, Country) - 101.1 MHz, 31 kW (WQSL and WQZL currently simulcast)
- WXQR (Jacksonville, Active Rock) - 105.5 MHz, 19 kW
- WLGD (Now WRMR, Modern Rock) (Wilmington, Spanish language) - 98.7 MHz, 100 kW

Kinston

- WRNS (Kinston, Country) - 960 kHz, 5/1 kW (WRNS and WRNS-FM currently simulcast)
- WRNS-FM (Kinston, Country) - 95.1 MHz, 100 kW (WRNS and WRNS-FM currently simulcast)

Southport

- WAZO (Wilmington, Contemporary Hit Radio) - 107.5 MHz, 75 kW

Wilmington

- WILT (Now WYHW, Christian Radio) (Wilmington, Adult contemporary) - 104.5 MHz, 17 kW
- WMFD (ESPN WILMINGTON RADIO 630, Wilmington, Sports talk) - 630 kHz, 0.8/1 kW
- WKXB (Wilmington, Rhythmic Oldies) - 99.9 MHz, 26 kW
- WSFM (sold to Sea-Comm Media and renamed WSFM to WUIN) (Wilmington, Modern rock) - 98.3 MHz, 18.5 kW

Washington

- WERO (Washington, Contemporary Hit Radio) - 93.3 MHz, 100 kW

=== Ohio ===
Canton

- WHBC News/Talk 1480 WHBC www.whbc.com (Canton, News/Talk) - 1480 kHz, 15/5 kW
- WHBC-FM Mix 94.1 www.mix941.com (Canton, Hot Adult Contemporary) - 94.1 MHz, 45 kW

=== South Carolina ===
Myrtle Beach

- WKZQ-FM (Forestbrook, Alternative rock) - 96.1 MHz, 100 kW
- WMYB (Myrtle Beach, CHR) - 92.1 MHz, 94 kW
- WRNN (Myrtle Beach, Sports) - 1450 kHz, 1/1 kW
- WRNN-FM (Socastee, News/Talk) - 99.5 MHz, 21.5 kW
- WYAV (Myrtle Beach, Classic Rock) - 104.1 kHz, 100 kW

=== Texas ===
Sherman/Denison

- KMKT (Bells, Country) - 93.1 MHz, 6.8 kW
- KLAK (Tom Bean, Adult Contemporary) - 97.5 MHz, 32 kW
- KMAD-FM (Whitesboro, Classic Rock) - 102.5 MHz, 18 kW

=== Wisconsin ===
Kenosha

- WIIL (Kenosha, Mainstream Rock) - 95.1 MHz, 50 kW
- WLIP (Kenosha, Oldies) - 1050 kHz, 0.25/0.25 kW

== Websites ==
NextMedia owns and operates coupon and deals websites Rocketgrab.com (serving their radio markets) and CouponCrab.com (serving the Myrtle Beach, SC area) created by the interactive arm NextMedia 360.
