= WRNS (AM) =

- Kinston, North Carolina; United States
- Frequency: 960 kHz
- Branding: Bet on The Bull

Programming
- Format: Sports gambling
- Affiliations: VSiN Radio; Carolina Panthers Radio Network

Ownership
- Owner: Dick Broadcasting; (Dick Broadcasting Company, Inc. of Tennessee)
- Sister stations: WERO; WQSL; WQZL; WRNS-FM; WXQR-FM

History
- First air date: February 28, 1937
- Last air date: May 30, 2025
- Former call signs: WFTC (1937–1989)
- Call sign meaning: Watchful Regional News Service

Technical information
- Licensing authority: FCC
- Facility ID: 36944
- Class: B
- Power: 5,000 watts day; 1,000 watts night
- Transmitter coordinates: 35°16′57.59″N 77°39′7.9″W

Links
- Public license information: Public file; LMS
- Webcast: Listen live
- Website: betonthebull.com

WRNS (960 kHz) was an AM radio station broadcasting a sports gambling format featuring programming from VSiN Radio, as well as an affiliate for Carolina Panthers NFL football. Licensed to Kinston, North Carolina, United States, the station was owned by Dick Broadcasting, through licensee Dick Broadcasting Company, Inc. of Tennessee. It operated from 1937 to 2025.

== History ==
WRNS was a simulcast of country music sister station WRNS-FM until April 2017, when it launched a sports radio format as "960 The Bull". The station featured CBS Sports Radio programming, supplemented by Down East Wood Ducks baseball and Carolina Panthers football.

In September 2017, Dick Broadcasting announced the purchase of Alpha Media stations in three markets — 18 stations and two translators in total, at a purchase price of $19.5 million. The acquisition of WRNS by Dick Broadcasting was consummated on December 20, 2017.

On August 21, 2023, WRNS relaunched the sports format with an emphasis on sports gambling, rebranding as "Bet on The Bull" and featuring programming from the VSiN sports betting network.

On May 8, 2025, Dick Broadcasting announced that it would close WRNS on May 30. In its announcement, the company said "the AM station no longer aligns with our long-term vision for audience engagement and how community members consume audio content". The Federal Communications Commission cancelled the station's license on May 26, 2026, at Dick Broadcasting's request.
