= WKKD =

WKKD may refer to:

- WKKD (AM), a defunct radio station in Aurora, Illinois
- WKKD-FM, the original call letters of WERV-FM
