= WMCW =

Radio station in Harvard, Illinois (1955–2008)

- Harvard, Illinois; United States
- Broadcast area: McHenry County, Illinois; Boone County, Illinois; Walworth County, Wisconsin
- Frequency: 1600 kHz

Programming
- Format: Defunct

History
- First air date: January 30, 1955
- Last air date: May 3, 2008
- Call sign meaning: "Milk Capital of the World"

Technical information
- Facility ID: 43241
- Class: D
- Power: 500 watts daytime; 18 watts night

WMCW (1600 AM) was a radio station licensed to Harvard, Illinois, United States. The station began broadcasting in 1955 and was originally owned by Esther Blodgett. WMCW was the first station in Illinois owned and operated by a woman. The station's call sign stood for "Milk Capital of the World".

== History ==
=== Esther Blodgett ownership ===
WMCW began broadcasting with midnight tests on January 30, 1955, and was officially dedicated February 22, 1955. The station originally ran 500 watts during daytime hours only. The station's motto was "Top of the State, Top of the Dial". The station aired a high amount of local programming, with owner Esther Blodgett serving as an announcer. In 1965, Blodgett was named "AP Correspondent of the Month" for her coverage of a tornado that struck the area during the Palm Sunday outbreak. Blodgett's final broadcast was March 14, 1979.

=== Obed Borgen ownership ===
In 1979, Blodgett sold the station to Obed Borgen for $175,000. Under Borgen's ownership, the station aired a country music format.

=== Mitchell Broadcasting ownership ===
In 1982, the station was sold to Mitchell Broadcasting for $245,000. The station would air a full service-MOR format. Throughout the 1980s along with WXET (now WZSR), WMCW broadcasts sports games from high schools across McHenry and Boone Counties and the city of Marengo’s Federal Savings show “Making your finances fit” every Monday through Friday at 7:10 AM. In 1996, ownership of the station was transferred Stateline Radio, which was owned by the daughter of the owner of Mitchell Broadcasting. WMCW was a favorite among locals, broadcasting daily local news and a talkshow featuring locals from the area every morning. The Station wrote daily local newspages which were delivered weekdays to local businesses in Harvard, Marengo and Woodstock. During Harvard's yearly Milk Day celebration the reporters were always on the scene, reporting in great color, all the action. Live reports from county fairs, local events and as many news worthy stories they could cover. On Sunday, the local church services were aired. The station continued airing a full service-soft AC format throughout the 1990s.

=== WPW Broadcasting ownership ===
Logo as an adult standards station

In 1999, the station was sold to WPW Broadcasting for $790,000. The station aired a news-talk format in 2002, featuring syndicated personalities such as Laura Ingraham. The station switched to an adult standards format by early 2003, with the slogan "Your Music, Your Lifestyle, Your Station". The station continued to air a large amount of local programming.

=== Kovas Communications ownership ===
In 2004, the station was sold to Kovas Communications for $650,000. In 2005, the station switched to Health Radio Network programming, simulcasting 1580 WKKD. On May 3, 2008, the station was taken silent, and the following year Kovas Communications surrendered WMCW's license, and the licenses of 1580 WKKD and 1600 WCGO to allow sister station 1590 WONX (now WCGO) to increase power to 7 kW.
