= WHBC =

WHBC may refer to:

- WHBC (AM), a radio station (1480 AM) licensed to Canton, Ohio, United States
- WHBC-FM, a radio station (94.1 FM) licensed to Canton, Ohio, United States
