= WKOO (disambiguation) =

WKOO may refer to:

- WRMR, a radio station (98.7 FM) in Jacksonville, North Carolina, United States, which carried the WKOO callsign from 1989 to 2005
- WBKZ, a radio station (105.1 FM) in Havelock, North Carolina, United States, which carried the WKOO callsign in 2005
- WNBU, a radio station (94.1 FM) in Oriental, North Carolina, United States, which carried the WKOO callsign from 2007 to 2009
- WKOO, a radio station licensed to serve the community of Rose Hill, North Carolina, United States, as in 2020, known as WEGG from December 28, 1970 until 1 July 2020
