= WKBM (disambiguation) =

WKBM is a radio station (107.9 FM) licensed to Ellenville, New York.

WKBM may also refer to:

- WRXQ, a radio station (100.7 FM) licensed to Coal City, Illinois, which held the call sign WKBM from 1990 to 1998
- WLII-DT, a television station (channel 11) licensed to Caguas, Puerto Rico, which held the call sign WKBM from 1960 to 1985
