= Susan Carlson =

American journalist

- Born: November 24, 1969 (age 56); Dolton, Illinois
- Education: Loyola University (BA); Roosevelt University (MA)
- Occupation: Broadcast journalist
- Years active: 1991-2020
- Television: WGN-TV (1995-2002); WBBM-TV (2002-2013); WMAQ-TV (2013-2020)

Susan Carlson (born November 24, 1969) is an American former broadcast journalist and news anchor.

== Early life and education ==
Susan Carlson was born in November 1969 and grew up in Dolton, Illinois. She attended Seton Academy in South Holland, Illinois, before earning a Bachelor of Arts degree in journalism from Loyola University Chicago, where she graduated magna cum laude. She received a Master of Arts degree in journalism from Roosevelt University.

== Career ==
Carlson began her career as a radio reporter and morning show anchor for WXLC and WKRS. She later became the news director of Shadow Traffic and broadcast news and traffic reports for WTMX, WILV, WJMK, and WSCR. She became a television traffic reporter for WGN-TV in Chicago in 1995 and worked there until 2002, when she took a job with WBBM-TV, eventually becoming co-anchor of the morning news.

Carlson left WBBM in 2013 and took a position with WMAQ-TV, becoming an anchor for that station in 2014. She left WMAQ in 2020 and announced plans to become an audiobook narrator and voiceover artist.

Carlson has received five local Emmy Awards (two for her work as a traffic reporter and three for her coverage of the Chicago Marathon), an Edward R. Murrow Award for "Best News Feature," and the Chicagoland Achievement in Radio Award for "Best News Reporter." In 2001, she was a media witness at the execution of Timothy McVeigh.

== Personal life ==
Carlson is divorced. In 2015, she adopted a 4-year-old girl from India.
