= WZSR =

Radio station in Woodstock, Illinois

- Woodstock, Illinois; United States
- Broadcast area: Northwest Suburban Chicago
- Frequency: 105.5 MHz
- Branding: Star 105.5

Programming
- Format: Hot adult contemporary
- Affiliations: Westwood One

Ownership
- Owner: Connoisseur Media; (Alpha Media Licensee LLC)
- Sister stations: WCCQ; WERV-FM; WIIL; WJOL; WKRS; WSSR; WXLC

History
- First air date: April 1, 1968 (as WSTK)
- Former call signs: WSTK (1968–1974); WXRD (1974–1984); WXET (1984–1988); WAIT-FM (1988–1991)
- Call sign meaning: "Star"

Technical information
- Licensing authority: FCC
- Facility ID: 53505
- Class: A
- ERP: 1,600 watts
- HAAT: 173 meters (568 ft)
- Transmitter coordinates: 42°15′34.1″N 88°21′45.3″W

Links
- Public license information: Public file; LMS
- Webcast: Listen live
- Website: www.star105.com

WZSR (105.5 FM, "Star 105.5") is a radio station broadcasting a hot adult contemporary format. Licensed to Woodstock, Illinois, United States, it serves Chicago's northwest suburbs. The station is owned by Connoisseur Media. WZSR's studios are located behind McHenry County College in Crystal Lake.

== History ==
=== WSTK ===
The station began broadcasting on April 1, 1968, and held the call sign WSTK. It was owned by Angelo Joseph Salvi. WSTK initially aired middle of the road (MOR) and country music. By 1971, the station was airing a country music format full time. The station was taken silent in late 1973.

=== WXRD ===
In March 1974, the station was sold to Mal Bellairs for $95,000 and returned to the air, with its call sign changed to WXRD. WXRD simulcast AM 850 WIVS in the morning and aired a progressive rock format branded "The Crossroads" the remainder of the day. By 1980, the station had switched to a MOR format.

In 1981, Bellairs sold the station, along with AM 850 WIVS, to Katy Communications of Elgin for $838,000. WXRD was refer as "X-105" ("The Star Station") in the early 1980s. On October 18, 1982, WXRD became an affiliate of the Satellite Music Network. The station then during the same time flipped to Top 40, despite its Satellite Music Network adult contemporary programming being used in its programming lineup, retaining its X-105 name. WXRD was also an affiliate of American Top 40 with Casey Kasem during its short Top 40 run. In early 1984, the station immediately switched to an adult contemporary format, using the Satellite Music Network's StarStation format.

=== WXET ===
On April 7, 1984, the station's call sign was changed to WXET. WXET aired an adult contemporary format and was branded "Lite Hits 105.5". As both WXRD and WXET from 1982 until 1988, the station also carried selected Chicago White Sox baseball games. On March 3, 1988, the station was sold to Crystal Lake Radio, along with AM 850 WAIT, for $1.6 million.

=== WAIT-FM ===
On November 14, 1988, the station's call sign was changed to WAIT-FM. WAIT-FM simulcast AM 850 WAIT mornings, while adult rock from the 1970s and 1980s aired the rest of the day. In June 1990, the station adopted a CHR format, airing programming from Satellite Music Network's "The Heat" network. In March 1991, it adopted a classic rock format, which also aired programming from the Satellite Music Network for only 6 months. Later that year, the station was sold to Pride Communications, along with AM 850 WAIT, for $2.2 million.

=== Star 105.5 ===
On August 29, 1991, the station dropped its short lived classic rock format and returned to its adult contemporary format, and it was branded "Star 105.5". On October 4, 1991, the station's call sign was changed to WZSR.

In October 2000, NextMedia Group purchased Pride Communications' nine radio stations, including WZSR, for approximately $57 million. In 2014, the station was sold to Matrix Broadcasting LLC.

In April 2019, WZSR was sold to Alpha Media due to Matrix Broadcasting's bankruptcy back in March 2018. Alpha Media merged with Connoisseur Media on September 4, 2025.
