= WKRS =

Radio station in Waukegan, Illinois

- Waukegan, Illinois; United States
- Broadcast area: Northeastern Illinois; Southeastern Wisconsin
- Frequency: 1220 kHz
- Branding: TUDN Radio

Programming
- Format: Spanish Sports
- Affiliations: TUDN Radio; Chicago Fire Soccer Club; Chicago White Sox

Ownership
- Owner: Connoisseur Media; (Alpha Media Licensee LLC)
- Sister stations: WCCQ; WERV-FM; WIIL; WJOL; WSSR; WXLC; WZSR

History
- First air date: September 25, 1949
- Call sign meaning: Waukegan Radio Station

Technical information
- Licensing authority: FCC
- Facility ID: 10450
- Class: D
- Power: 1,000 watts day; 90 watts night
- Transmitter coordinates: 42°20′59.1″N 87°52′53.3″W

Links
- Public license information: Public file; LMS
- Webcast: Listen live
- Website: www.tudn1220.com

WKRS (1220 AM) is a radio station broadcasting a Spanish-language sports format. Licensed to Waukegan, Illinois, United States, the station is owned by Connoisseur Media, through licensee Alpha Media Licensee LLC, and features programming from TUDN Radio. Its transmitter is located in Waukegan, while its studios are based in the north end of the Gurnee Mills mall in Gurnee.

== History ==
The station began broadcasting September 25, 1949. It ran 1,000 watts during daytime hours only, and was owned by The News-Sun Broadcasting Company. In 1983, WKRS was sold to Roger E. Kaplan, owner of 102.3 WXLC, for $650,000. In 1987, the station was sold to H&D Radio Limited Partnership, along with WXLC, for $5.5 million. In 1997, it was sold to Spring Broadcasting, and in 1999 it was sold to Belvidere Broadcasting, along with WXLC, for $4.3 million. In 2000, the station was sold to NextMedia Group, along with WXLC, for $9.4 million.

Between 1949 and 2012, WKRS had been a longtime English language radio station broadcasting local news and information for the Lake County region. Personalities heard on WKRS included national hosts Laura Ingraham, Michael Savage, Bill O'Reilly, and Dave Ramsey, along with local hosts Al Salvi, Libby Collins, and Lenny Palmer, The Jack Taylor Program, among others. Known at times as "The Voice Of Lake County" and "The Talk of Lake County", WKRS also broadcast Lake County Fielders minor league baseball games as well as high school sports for the Lake County area.

Among its alumni are Chicago TV reporters Anita Padilla, Matt Rodewald, and Susan Carlson.

=== Spanish-language era ===
In January 2012, it was announced that the station would drop its longtime English-language talk format in favor of a Spanish-language sports format, with programming from ESPN Deportes Radio, effective February 1, 2012.

In 2014, WKRS and NextMedia's 32 other radio stations were sold to Digity, LLC for $85 million. In 2016, Digity, LLC was purchased by Alpha Media for $264 million.

After ESPN Deportes Radio was discontinued on September 8, 2019, the station became an affiliate of TUDN Radio.

Alpha Media merged with Connoisseur Media on September 4, 2025.
