= WKKD (AM) =

- Aurora, Illinois; United States
- Frequency: 1580 kHz

History
- First air date: September 21, 1960
- Last air date: November 29, 2008
- Former call signs: WKKD (1960–1973); WFVR (1973–1983)
- Call sign meaning: Kane, Kendall and DuPage

Technical information
- Facility ID: 72077
- Class: B
- Power: 170 watts (day); 200 watts (night)

WKKD (1580 AM) was a radio station licensed to Aurora, Illinois. The station's studios, transmitter and towers were at 1880 Plain Avenue in Aurora.

== History ==
=== Early history ===
The station was originally owned by Chicago area radio announcer, emcee, and engineer Russell G. Salter, and began broadcasting on September 21, 1960. The station initially ran 250 watts during daytime hours only with a three tower directional pattern towards Aurora.

The station began simulcasting on 95.9 WKKD-FM on February 12, 1961. Bill Blough hosted a country music program in the station's first years. Chicago weathercaster Tom Skilling began his career at WKKD, c. 1966, while he attended High School in Aurora. By 1968, the simulcast had ended. WKKD 1580 would air an easy listening format.

=== WFVR ===
In 1973, the station's callsign was changed to WFVR, standing for "Fox Valley Radio", and the station adopted a country music format.

=== Adult contemporary era ===
By 1979, the station had adopted an adult contemporary-MOR format.

In 1983, the station's callsign was changed back to WKKD and it became part of a partial simulcast with WKKD-FM, while continuing to air an adult contemporary format. On October 3, 1986, the station was granted a construction permit to broadcast during nighttime hours.

=== Pure Gold ===
By 1988, the station had begun airing an oldies format branded as "Pure Gold". By 1989, the station had begun nighttime operations. In 1993, WKKD-FM began simulcasting the oldies format of WKKD.

=== Real Country ===
In March 1995, AM 1580 adopted a country music format, airing Satellite Music Network's "Real Country" format.

=== Viva 1580 ===
On July 1, 1996, the station adopted a Spanish language Tejano music format as "Viva 1580".

=== CNN Headline News ===
In 1997, the station adopted an all-news format, airing the national audio feed of CNN Headline News. In 2000, the Salter family sold WKKD AM & FM, as well as WRWC in Rockford, Illinois to RadioWorks for $6.5 million, plus $1.5 million in consulting and non-compete agreements. In 2001, the station was sold to NextMedia Group, along with WKKD-FM, for $3.4 million.

=== Kovas Communications ownership ===
In early 2002, the station was sold to Kovas Communications for $825,000, and it began simulcasting the ethnic programming of WONX. In October 2004, the station began airing talk shows related to health and fitness, becoming a full-time "Health Radio" outlet February 1, 2005. This format would later be simulcast on 1600 WMCW.

=== End of operations ===
In 2007, Kovas Communications applied with the FCC to move WKKD to Silvis, Illinois. In February 2008, the station was granted a construction permit to move WKKD to Silvis, Illinois, and increase its power to 1,000 watts during the day and 1,400 watts at night. On November 29, 2008, the station was taken off the air and on April 10, 2009, Kovas Communications surrendered the station's license to the FCC. WKKD's license was surrendered, along with 1600 WMCW's and 1600 WCGO's, in order to enable 1590 WONX (now WCGO) to increase its daytime power from 3,500 watts to 7,000 watts.

The Federal Communications Commission cancelled the station's license on April 20, 2009.
