= WCGO (1600 AM) =

- Chicago Heights, Illinois; United States
- Broadcast area: South suburban Chicago; Northwest Indiana
- Frequency: 1600 kHz

Programming
- Format: Full service (1959–1997); Adult standards (1997–2009)

History
- First air date: August 27, 1959
- Last air date: April 10, 2009
- Call sign meaning: "Chicago"

Technical information
- Facility ID: 39386
- Class: D
- Power: 1,000 watts day 23 watts night

WCGO (1600 AM) was a radio station licensed to Chicago Heights, Illinois, United States. The station ran 1,000 watts during the day and 23 watts at night.

== Coverage area ==
WCGO served southern Cook County, Illinois, most of central and eastern Will County, Illinois, and northern Lake County, Indiana during daytime hours, while its nighttime coverage was more limited. The station had a two tower directional array in northern Ford Heights, Illinois, and had a directional pattern to the northeast and southwest to protect WMCW in Harvard, Illinois and WARU in Peru, Indiana, which were on the same frequency.

== History ==
WCGO began broadcasting August 27, 1959 and was owned by South Cook Broadcasting, Inc.; Anthony Santucci, president; Anthony DiCarlo, vice president; Gustav Hahn, secretary; Tony D'Amico, treasurer. The station originally broadcast 1,000 watts during daytime hours only.

=== Full service years ===
WCGO had long aired a full service format, airing a variety of local programming and playing Middle of the road (MOR) music, which in early years included pop standards and later on adult contemporary. Much of the station's local news, talk and community programming was simulcast on its sister station 102.3 WTAS in Crete, Illinois, until 1992. In 1985, the station began airing the Warren Freiberg - Libby Collins Show, which had been heard on 106.3 WLNR in Lansing, Illinois since 1973. In 1992, the station shifted to an all talk format.

In the summer of 1994, Anthony Santucci sold WCGO to M&M Broadcasting, a firm led by former Hammond, Indiana mayor Thomas McDermott, Sr. for $230,000. In August 1994, WCGO began nighttime operations, with light adult contemporary music airing from 7 pm to 5:59 am, while talk programming continued to air during the day. In 1997, M&M Broadcasting sold the station to Q Broadcasting for $400,000.

=== Unforgettable 1600 ===
In 1997, the station adopted an adult standards format, featuring programming from Stardust, and later its successors; Timeless Favorites, Timeless Classics and Timeless. During this period the station was known as "Unforgettable 1600". WCGO continued to air this format until the station was taken off the air in 2009.

=== End of operations ===
In 2002, the station was purchased by Kovas Communications for $750,000, who intended to take it, along with 1580 WKKD and 1600 WMCW, off the air in order to enable co-owned station 1590 WONX in Evanston, Illinois to increase its daytime power. WCGO went silent on April 10, 2009, and its license was surrendered to the FCC, enabling 1590 WONX to increase its daytime power from 3,500 watts to 7,000 watts. On April 13, 2009, 1590 WONX took on the WCGO call sign. Kovas Communications had held a construction permit, which would have moved the station to Jenison, Michigan (near Grand Rapids), broadcasting on 1020 kHz at 10,000 watts during daytime hours only, though this move never occurred.
