= NextMedia =

NextMedia may refer to:

- Next Digital, formerly Next Media, Hong Kong media company
- NextMedia Group, American media company
- nextmedia, Australian publisher
