= William Joseph Johnston =

William Joseph Johnston may refer to:

- Bill Johnston (politician) (born 1962), Australian politician
- William Joseph Johnston (novelist) (1924–2010), American novelist
