= WIIL =

Radio station in Union Grove, Wisconsin

Coordinates: 42.552780°N 87.893825°W

- Union Grove, Wisconsin; United States
- Broadcast area: Southeast Wisconsin; Northern Illinois
- Frequency: 95.1 MHz
- Branding: 95 WIIL Rock

Programming
- Format: Active rock
- Affiliations: United Stations Radio Networks

Ownership
- Owner: Connoisseur Media; (Alpha Media Licensee LLC)
- Sister stations: WLIP

History
- First air date: December 22, 1962 (as WLIP-FM)
- Former call signs: WLIP-FM (1961–1978); WJZQ (1978–1992)
- Call sign meaning: A border station serving Wisconsin and Illinois (postal abbreviations combined)

Technical information
- Licensing authority: FCC
- Facility ID: 28473
- Class: B
- ERP: 50,000 watts
- HAAT: 117 meters (384 ft)

Links
- Public license information: Public file; LMS
- Webcast: Listen live
- Website: www.95wiilrock.com

WIIL (95.1 FM) is a commercial radio station licensed to Union Grove, Wisconsin. The station serves Kenosha (its original city of license), Racine, the southern suburbs of Milwaukee and the northern suburbs of Chicago. WIIL is owned and operated by Connoisseur Media and airs an active rock radio format.

The call letters stand for Wisconsin and Illinois for its dual-state coverage area. The station is branded as "95 WIIL Rock," with "WIIL" pronounced on air the same as 'will'. The station has an effective radiated power (ERP) of 50,000 watts, the maximum output for the region in which it operates. The station's transmitter (and former studio site) is off Green Bay Road (Wisconsin Highway 31) at 85th Street in Pleasant Prairie, Wisconsin, while its current studio is based in the north end of the Gurnee Mills mall in Gurnee.

WIIL serves as a complement to a Connoisseur-programmed station licensed to Coal City, Illinois, and broadcasting from Crest Hill, WRXQ (100.7), which serves the southern and southwest suburbs of Chicago.

== History ==
=== Beautiful music WLIP-FM ===
On December 22, 1962, the station signed on as WLIP-FM, licensed to Kenosha. It was owned by William Lipman, with the first letters of his last name used in the station's call sign. WLIP-FM’s effective radiated power was 4,000 watts, a fraction of its current output. The station simulcast co-owned WLIP (1050 AM). After a few years, the simulcast ended and WLIP-FM began running its own music programming from 6 a.m. to midnight, offering a beautiful music format.

In the mid-1970s, WLIP-FM began playing progressive rock in the evenings, and was known as "Rock 95 LIP-FM". By 1978, the station had converted to a fulltime album oriented rock (AOR) format and changed its call letters to WJZQ.

=== Top 40 WJZQ ===
In the early 1980s, Rock 95 changed to a Top 40/CHR format. In 1990, it became a rhythmic-leaning Top 40 station, first as FM 95 WJZQ, and then later as Power 95 WJZQ.

The station returned to mainstream top 40 by late 1991/early 1992. The transition to Power 95 was marked by a day-long stunt with a continuous loop of "The Power" by Snap!, for 24 hours without interruption or explanation.

=== WIIL Rock ===
In September 1992, the call letters changed to WIIL, using the moniker 95 WIIL ROCK with a classic rock format. For a short period in the summer of 2003, WIIL was renamed 95.1 The Rock Station, but returned to "95 WIIL Rock" not long after.

In 2000, the NextMedia Group acquired WIIL and WLIP. In 2004, WIIL shifted in an active rock direction, while continuing to report to radio trade publications as a mainstream rock station. In November 2009, the station officially changed to active rock status.

=== Move to Union Grove ===
In April 2010, the station received Federal Communications Commission (FCC) approval to change its city of license from Kenosha to Union Grove. That technically put the station in Racine County, and outside Kenosha County. This was to allow NextMedia Group to stay within ownership caps with its Chicago cluster. Kenosha County is classified as being within the Chicago radio market by Arbitron/Nielsen Audio, while Racine County is within the Milwaukee radio market; moving the city of license to Union Grove placed WIIL within the Milwaukee Nielsen ratings service market. The actual location of the transmitter and studios were not changed until 2020, when upon the repeal of the Main Studio Rule, the station's owners were able to re-locate the studio operations of WIIL and WLIP into a combined facility with WXLC and WKRS within Gurnee Mills; the studios coincidentally opened on March 12, 2020, one day after the COVID-19 pandemic was declared.

=== Ownership changes ===
In 2013, Florida-based Digity Media acquired the NextMedia Group, including WIIL and sister station WLIP.

In 2015, Alpha Media spent $264 million to acquire the 116 radio stations of Digity Media, including the former NextMedia stations. Alpha Media merged with Connoisseur Media on September 4, 2025.

== Music festivals ==
AugustFest was a music festival created and produced by Lakeside Productions, Inc, and sponsored by WIIL. It was held in August 2007 and 2008 at the Lake County Fairgrounds in Grayslake, Illinois. The all-day festival featured two stages and multiple bands.

The 2007 AugustFest was held on August 25 and featured performances from Chevelle, Saliva, Shinedown, Crossfade, and PreZence.

The 2008 AugustFest took place on August 9. This iteration featured performances from Shinedown, P.O.D., Filter, Alter Bridge and Black Stone Cherry as headliners, with 12 Stones performing on a second stage.

The WIIL Rock Fest is an annual music festival produced and sponsored by FM Entertainment, 95 WIIL Rock and Route 20 Outhouse in Sturtevant, Wisconsin. The 2012 WIIL Rock Fest was held on August 11 and featured performances by All That Remains, Saving Abel, 10 Years, Fear Factory, Static-X, Black Stone Cherry, and Shadows Fall and others.

The 2013 WIIL Rock Fest was held on August 24 and featured a partial lineup of Volbeat, HIM, Airbourne, Nonpoint, Trapt, Hurt, SOiL, Red Line Chemistry, and Smile Empty Soul. There was no 2014 Rock Fest.

The 2015 WIIL Rock Fest was held at Franksville Memorial Park in Racine County, Wisconsin. Performing bands included Hollywood Undead, Pop Evil, Royal Bliss, We Are Harlot, Saint Asonia, Red Sun Rising, Starset, Devour the Day, Texas Hippie Coalition, Aranda, Butcher Babies, Failure Anthem and Psychostick.
