= Wisconsin Highway 311 =

State highway in Racine County, Wisconsin, United States

State Trunk Highway 311
- Wisconn Valley Way
- WIS 311 highlighted in red

Route information
- Maintained by WisDOT
- Length: 2.0 mi (3.2 km)
- Existed: 2022–present

Major junctions
- South end: WIS 195 in Mount Pleasant
- North end: WIS 11 in Mount Pleasant

Location
- Country: United States
- State: Wisconsin
- Counties: Racine

Highway system
- Wisconsin State Trunk Highway System; Interstate; US; State; Scenic; Rustic
← WIS 310	→ WIS 312

State Trunk Highway 311 (STH-311, WIS 311) is a state trunk highway which runs for 2.0 miles (3.2 km) in the village of Mount Pleasant, Racine County, Wisconsin. The highway acts as a frontage road to Interstate 41/Interstate 94 (I-41/I-94), providing access to the Wisconn Valley Science and Technology Park developed by Foxconn.

== Route description ==
WIS 311 meanders along a four-lane divided roadway in its entirety, which is sandwiched in between I-41/I-94 to the west and a Foxconn plant to the east. There are only three intersections, all signalized, throughout the route. The roadway starts at WIS 195 at the Somers–Mount Pleasant line, then curves slightly to the west and east before intersecting with Braun Road. The road then curves slightly to the west and then takes on a northeastern direction before ending at WIS 11.

== History ==
Construction on Wisconn Valley Way was slated to begin in April 2019 and finish by the end of the year. The project was part of infrastructure improvements to support the Foxconn plant in Mount Pleasant. The Wisconsin Department of Transportation (WisDOT) awarded a contract for $16.9 million (equivalent to $19.9 million in 2023) for the work. The roadway was named by former Governor Scott Walker and former Foxconn CEO Terry Gou. The roadway opened on January 17, 2020.

Officials at WisDOT sent a letter to residents in Racine County on May 12, 2022, stating that Wisconn Valley Way would receive a state highway designation under the WIS 311 name. Initial reports stated that the Wisconn Valley Way name would be replaced, but this was clarified to state that the designation would not supplant the local road name.

== Major intersections ==
County	Location	mi	km	Destinations	Notes
Kenosha–Racine county line	Somers–Mount Pleasant line	0.0	0.0	WIS 195 (County Line Road)	Southern terminus
Racine	Mount Pleasant	1.1	1.8	Braun Road	
Racine	Mount Pleasant	2.0	3.2	WIS 11 (Durand Avenue)	Northern terminus
1.000 mi = 1.609 km; 1.000 km = 0.621 mi
