= WLIP =

Radio station in Kenosha, Wisconsin

- Kenosha, Wisconsin; United States
- Broadcast area: Kenosha, Wisconsin
- Frequency: 1050 kHz
- Branding: AM 1050 WLIP

Programming
- Format: Talk and full-service
- Affiliations: Fox News Radio; Premiere Networks; Westwood One; Learfield Sports

Ownership
- Owner: Connoisseur Media; (Alpha Media Licensee LLC)
- Sister stations: WIIL

History
- First air date: May 18, 1947
- Call sign meaning: Station founder William Lippman

Technical information
- Licensing authority: FCC
- Facility ID: 28478
- Class: B
- Power: 250 watts
- Transmitter coordinates: 42°33′10.1″N 87°53′38.3″W

Links
- Public license information: Public file; LMS
- Webcast: Listen live
- Website: www.wlip.com

WLIP (1050 AM) is a commercial radio station licensed to Kenosha, Wisconsin, United States, serving parts of the Chicago and Milwaukee metropolitan areas along the west shore of Lake Michigan. Owned by Connoisseur Media, WLIP features a talk and full-service format, with studios located in the north end of the Gurnee Mills Mall in Gurnee, Illinois. WLIP's transmitter, on land that formerly contained its studios, is sited off of Green Bay Road (Wisconsin Highway 31) in Pleasant Prairie.

== History ==
=== Early years ===
At 8 a.m. on Sunday, May 18, 1947, WLIP signed on the air. The studios were originally in the Kenosha National Bank Building basement at 625 57th Street in downtown Kenosha. The station was licensed for daytime-only broadcasts at 250 watts. In 1982, WLIP built and opened its new studios at 8500 Green Bay Road.

In 1962, the station launched an FM sister: 95.1 WLIP-FM, later known as WJZQ, and then WIIL.

During the late 1950s and much of the 1960s, the AM station programmed a popular adult music format. However, the owner, Bill Lipman, did not allow for "Top 40 Hits" to be played. A weekend show with staffer Terry Havel was the only show featuring hit music. The station was required to sign off at sundown.

As Kenosha was the home of American Motors (AMC), the station was a strong union operation, having on-air staff under AFTRA and engineers under IBEW representation, rare for a station in a mid-sized city such as Kenosha. Its program schedule served the "at work" audience at AMC and other large Kenosha factories.

WLIP-FM offered separate programming during that time and carried an easy listening format. Bill Lipman's wife, Anne, was influential in the music choices of WLIP-FM, until 1975 when new management took over.

=== Adult contemporary, standards and oldies ===
In 1975, WLIP-AM-FM began operating under new management. The AM station switched to a full service, adult contemporary format as "Music 1050" with news and information aimed at the Kenosha community. Lipman's sons and daughter took over the management of the stations by the late 1970s.

In 1987, the Federal Communications Commission granted WLIP permission to broadcast full time. During the 1990s the station added talk programming in the daytime with oldies music played nights and weekends. In 1996, the station changed its sound and began using Dial Global's syndicated Adult Standards service. This format lasted until December 2003 when the station changed its affiliation to the syndicated Unforgettable Favorites format from ABC Radio. In 2005, over the Fourth of July weekend, the station switched to ABC's Oldies Radio.

=== Talk radio ===
By 2010, WLIP increased its local talk programming during most of the day, with replays some of shows in the evenings. Syndicated talk shows air during some hours. On the weekends, it carries how-to programs, brokered programming and talk shows, most of which are local.

WLIP plays 1960s–1970s oldies music during part of each weekend, along with specialty 1950s–1960s oldies shows Jukebox Saturday Night on Saturdays and The Doo-Wop Diner on Sundays. The Music of the Stars with Lou Rugani has aired each Sunday morning since 1992.
