= Mitch Michaels =

American rock and roll radio disc jockey

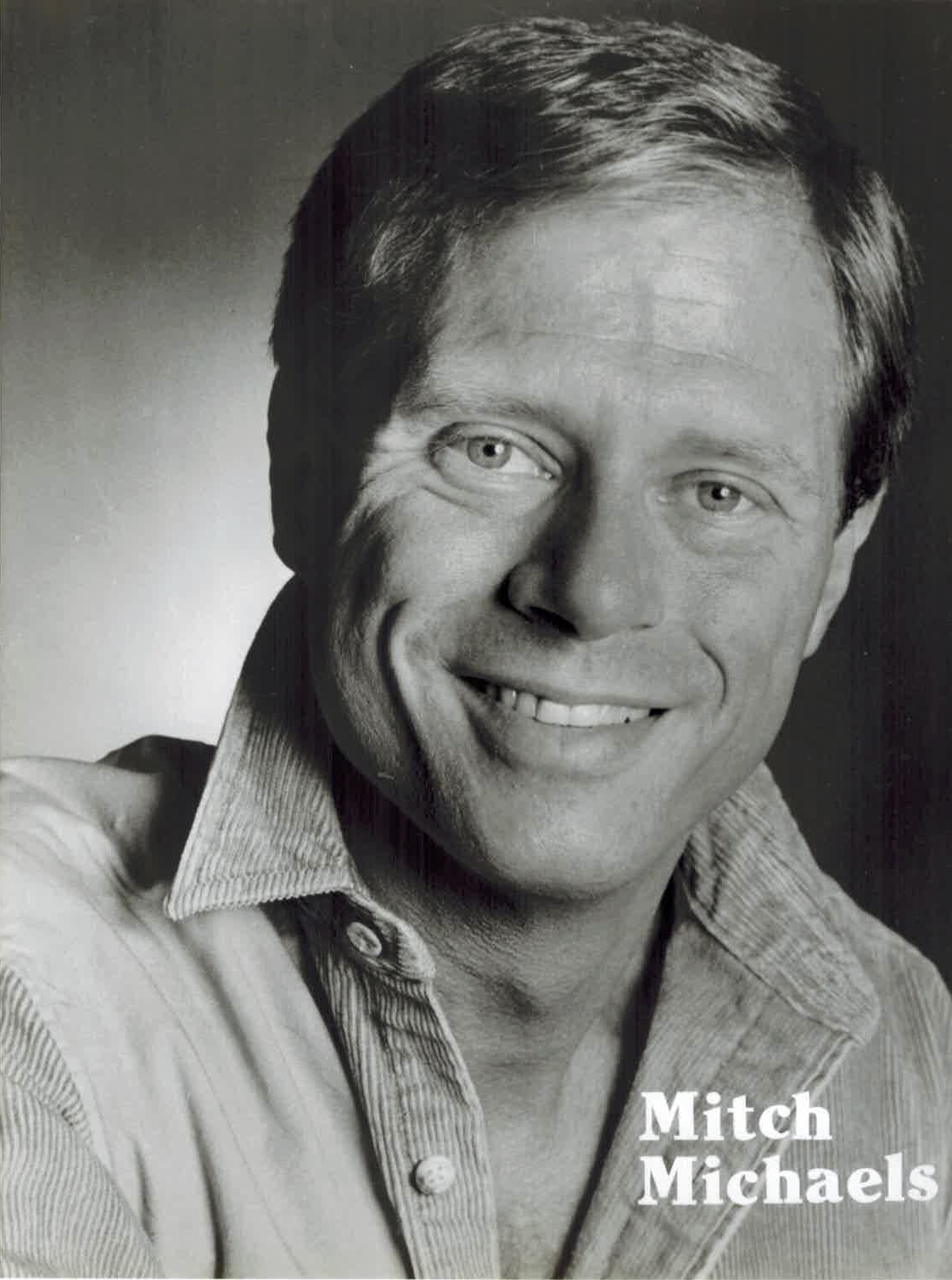
Mitch Michaels

Mitch Michaels (born Richard Salchow in Cleveland, Ohio on March 20, 1948) is an American rock and roll radio disc jockey. Known for his contributions to many spots on the Chicago radio dial, he is best known for helping start WXRT-FM and for his work at WKQX-FM, WLUP-FM "The Loop" and WCKG-FM in Chicago, Illinois. Michaels has been on the air since his first radio job at WHFS-FM in Bethesda, Maryland in 1968. He most recently was 'Doin The Cruise' in the afternoon on WERV-FM 95.9 "The River" in Aurora, Illinois.

== Career ==
Michaels began his radio career on the air at WHFS-FM in Bethesda, Maryland. in November 1968 stepping in on numerous occasions for host Abby Lincoln on her jazz show when she was unable to perform. Later, while a student at Kent State University, he worked in Cleveland radio starting at WGAR-AM in 1969 and then on to WNCR-FM and WMMS-FM. He remained in Cleveland until an offer from WGLD-FM brought him to Chicago in late 1971. Michaels has been on the air in the Chicago market ever since with a list of call letters longer than Dr. Johnny Fever's (that includes WGLD, WXRT, WDAI, WKQX, WLUP, WCKG, WLS, 9FM & WXCD) the difference being Michaels's are all in Chicago. He was 'Doin' the Cruise' and from 3p–7p at 95.9 "The River" WERV-FM in Aurora, Illinois until March 2023.

Monday December 20, 2021 marked a milestone for Mitch Michaels, afternoon personality on Alpha Media west suburban classic hits WERV 95.9-FM. It was the 50th anniversary of his first broadcast on Chicago radio — as evening host on the former WGLD. “The station was on the 5th floor of an old folks’ home — the Oak Park Arms Hotel in Oak Park — "which I always thought was an unusual place for a rock station,” he once recalled. “There was a fire escape in the program director’s office and the door out faced east. I’d go out there for smoke breaks and just look at the Chicago skyline at night, knowing that’s where I really needed to be.” Michaels went on to a stellar career, including stops at WXRT, WDAI, WKQX, WLUP and WCKG. September 5, 2017, he released his memoir entitled "Doin the Cruise" Memories from a Lifetime in Radio and Rock n Roll (Eckhartz Press). He recently was elected to the Illinois Rock n Roll Museum's HOF in the radio personality category alongside such luminaries as Larry Lujack, John 'Records' Landecker, Bob Sirott and Dick Biondi.

In addition to his radio life, he has a wide variety of interests, music of course, gardening, cooking and golf. Michaels and his third wife owned Modern Simplicity, an upscale clothing business from 1997 to 2001 with locations in [New Buffalo, Michigan] and [Naperville, Illinois].

Personal life Michaels is father to five children Jennifer, Jeffery, Mitchell, Spencer (d. 2015) and McKenna and a grandfather of seven as well. He married his high school sweetheart Lynn Julian in August 1967 but the couple split in 1974. In 1981, he married Chrissie Lucas. The two divorced in 1984 and in 1991 he married for the third and final time to Danielle Silva. They ultimately parted in 2004.
