= WRNS-FM =

- Kinston, North Carolina; United States
- Broadcast area: Kinston, North Carolina
- Frequency: 95.1 MHz
- Branding: 95.1 WRNS

Programming
- Format: Country
- Affiliations: Compass Media Networks; Premiere Networks

Ownership
- Owner: Dick Broadcasting; (Dick Broadcasting Company, Inc. of Tennessee)
- Sister stations: WERO; WQSL; WQZL; WXQR-FM

History
- First air date: October 12, 1968

Technical information
- Licensing authority: FCC
- Facility ID: 36950
- Class: C
- ERP: 100,000 watts
- HAAT: 459 meters (1,506 ft)
- Transmitter coordinates: 35.2826°N 77.6520°W

Links
- Public license information: Public file; LMS
- Webcast: Listen live
- Website: www.wrns.com

WRNS-FM (95.1 MHz) is a radio station located in Kinston, North Carolina, in the United States. Its format is contemporary country.

The station has a non-directional signal of 100,000 watts, that reaches "from the capital to the coast". The station has served Kinston and eastern North Carolina since the 1960s, when it was WFTC-FM. At one time, it was the only country station in the area and had one of the highest market shares of any station. Known for its generosity, the station has held a radiothon for St. Jude Children's Research Hospital annually for the past five years. The station is constantly ranked as the #1 station in its market by Arbitron.

The WRNS-FM transmitter antenna is located on WCTI-TV's tower north of Trenton, North Carolina. Studios are located in New Bern.

WRNS-FM was simulcast on WRNS (960 AM) until April 2017, when the AM station switched to sports radio programming. In September 2017, Dick Broadcasting announced the purchase of Alpha Media stations in three markets — 18 stations and two translators in total, at a purchase price of $19.5 million. The acquisition of WRNS-FM by Dick Broadcasting was consummated on December 20, 2017.

Jim Mantel, who spent 18 years on WGAR-FM in Cleveland and was named to the Country Radio Hall of Fame in 2017, retired in 2018 after hosting the morning show since 2010, joined by Crystal Legends in 2012. Bobby Bones moved from co-owned WQSL/WQZL to replace Mantel, and Legends, also program director, moved to middays.
