= WERV-FM =

Radio station in Aurora, Illinois

Coordinates: 41.769°N 88.267°W

- Aurora, Illinois; United States
- Broadcast area: West Suburban Chicago
- Frequency: 95.9 MHz (HD Radio)
- Branding: 95.9 The River

Programming
- Format: Classic alternative

Ownership
- Owner: Connoisseur Media; (Alpha Media Licensee LLC)
- Sister stations: WCCQ; WIIL; WJOL; WKRS; WSSR; WXLC; WZSR

History
- First air date: February 12, 1961; 65 years ago
- Former call signs: WKKD-FM (1961–1981); WKKD (6/17/1981-9/22/1981); WKKD-FM (1981–2001)
- Call sign meaning: "River"

Technical information
- Licensing authority: FCC
- Facility ID: 73171
- Class: A
- ERP: 2,850 watts
- HAAT: 103 meters (338 ft)

Links
- Public license information: Public file; LMS
- Webcast: Listen live
- Website: www.959theriver.com

WERV-FM (95.9 MHz "95.9 The River") is a commercial radio station, licensed to Aurora, Illinois, and serving the western suburbs of Chicago. It is owned by Connoisseur Media, through licensee Alpha Media Licensee LLC. WERV-FM has a classic alternative radio format.

WERV-FM has an effective radiated power (ERP) of 2,850 watts. The studios and transmitter are on Plain Avenue in Aurora.

== History ==
=== Early years ===
This station was the radio dream of WLS Radio announcer, emcee, and engineer Russ Salter, who put this station (then WKKD-FM); along with WKKD (1580 AM) on the air. WKKD AM debuted on September 21, 1960, and WKKD-FM on February 12, 1961. The WKKD call sign stood for Kane, Kendall and DuPage, which were the primary counties in the stations' coverage area. Both stations' studios, transmitters and towers were at 1880 Plain Avenue in Aurora.

The station was part of a simulcast with WKKD AM. Bill Blough hosted a country music program in the station's first years. Chicago weathercaster Tom Skilling began his career at WKKD, c. 1966, while he attended high school in Aurora.

=== The Golden Sounds ===
By 1968, the simulcast had ended. WKKD-FM was branded "The Golden Sounds". The station aired a beautiful music format in the 1970s and into the early 1980s.

=== Adult contemporary ===
In late 1983, AM 1580's call sign was changed back to WKKD, and the two stations became part of a partial simulcast. The station aired an adult contemporary format, branded as "classic hits", playing music from the 1960s, 1970s, and 1980s. Throughout the 1980s, WKKD was originally used on a local access channel in Naperville throughout its AC days on Jones Intercable until the summer of 1988.

In the late 1980s, the station aired a soft AC format, as "Lite Mix", with the branding changing to "K-Lite" in 1989. The station continued to air this format into the early 1990s.

In 1992, WKKD-FM became the flagship radio station for the Kane County Cougars baseball team.

=== Oldies ===
In 1993, the station adopted an oldies format, and was branded "Pure Gold 96". WKKD-FM was again part of a simulcast with WKKD AM 1580. In 1998 the station changed its branding to "Kool 95.9", while continuing to air an oldies format.

In 2000, the Salter family sold WKKD AM and FM, as well as WRWC in Rockford, Illinois, to RadioWorks for $6.5 million, plus $1.5 million in consulting and non-compete agreements.

=== Classic hits ===
In 2001 WKKD-FM and AM were sold to NextMedia Group for $3.4 million. On January 25, 2001, the station became "95.9 The River", airing a classic hits format with the slogan "Rock 'N Roll Favorites for the 'Burbs". The station's call sign was changed to WERV-FM shortly thereafter. The classic hits format on WERV-FM leaned toward classic rock: its playlist stressed the rock hits of the 1980s, 1990s and early 2000s such as Van Halen, U2 and Bon Jovi, but did not play pop and dance artists such as Michael Jackson, Madonna or Whitney Houston, heard on most classic hits stations.

On July 15, 2006, the station debuted an HD-2 station branded "The Rapids!", airing a hard rock gold format.

NextMedia sold WERV-FM and their 32 other radio stations to Digity, LLC at a price of $84,975,200; the transaction was consummated on February 10, 2014. Effective February 25, 2016, Digity and its 124 radio stations were acquired by Alpha Media for $264 million.

Personalities heard on The River include Scott Mackay, Nick Jakusz, Mitch Michaels, Leslie Harris and Scott Childers.

=== Classic alternative ===
On May 24, 2024, at 2 p.m., after playing "Right Now" by Van Halen, WERV-FM relaunched with a classic alternative format, retaining the "River" name; the first song under the relaunched format was "Today" by Chicago-founded band The Smashing Pumpkins.

Alpha Media merged with Connoisseur Media on September 4, 2025.

On July 2, 2026, the station was taken off the air because its broadcast tower was destroyed by a storm.

== See also ==
- WKKD (AM)
