= Wisconsin Highway 195 =

State highway in Wisconsin, United States

State Trunk Highway 195
- County Line Road
- WIS 195 highlighted in red

Route information
- Maintained by WisDOT
- Length: 7.48 mi (12.04 km)
- Existed: November 2024–present
- History: Formerly Racine/Kenosha County Trunk Highway KR

Major junctions
- West end: I-41 / I-94 / US 41 in Kellogg's Corners
- WIS 31
- East end: WIS 32 on Somers–Mount Pleasant line

Location
- Country: United States
- State: Wisconsin
- Counties: Kenosha, Racine

Highway system
- Wisconsin State Trunk Highway System; Interstate; US; State; Scenic; Rustic
| ← WIS 194 | → WIS 213 |

State Trunk Highway 195 (known otherwise as Highway 195, STH-195 or WIS 195) is a state highway along the Kenosha–Racine county line in the US state of Wisconsin that runs east–west as a suburban route. WIS 195 is a multi-lane highway from Interstate 41/Interstate 94/US Highway 41 (I-41/I-94/US 41) to WIS 32 (Sheridan Road) that was widened in 2020 to accommodate new Foxconn industrial facilities along the route. Before coming under state control, the road was designated as County Trunk Highway KR (CTH-KR) before November 18, 2024. The state anticipated transferring this route back to the county after the widening, but did not move forward with this plan. The state accepted jurisdiction over the roadway in a transfer agreement that placed the former WIS 75 under county control in both counties, now so designated as County Trunk Highway BD.

== Route description ==
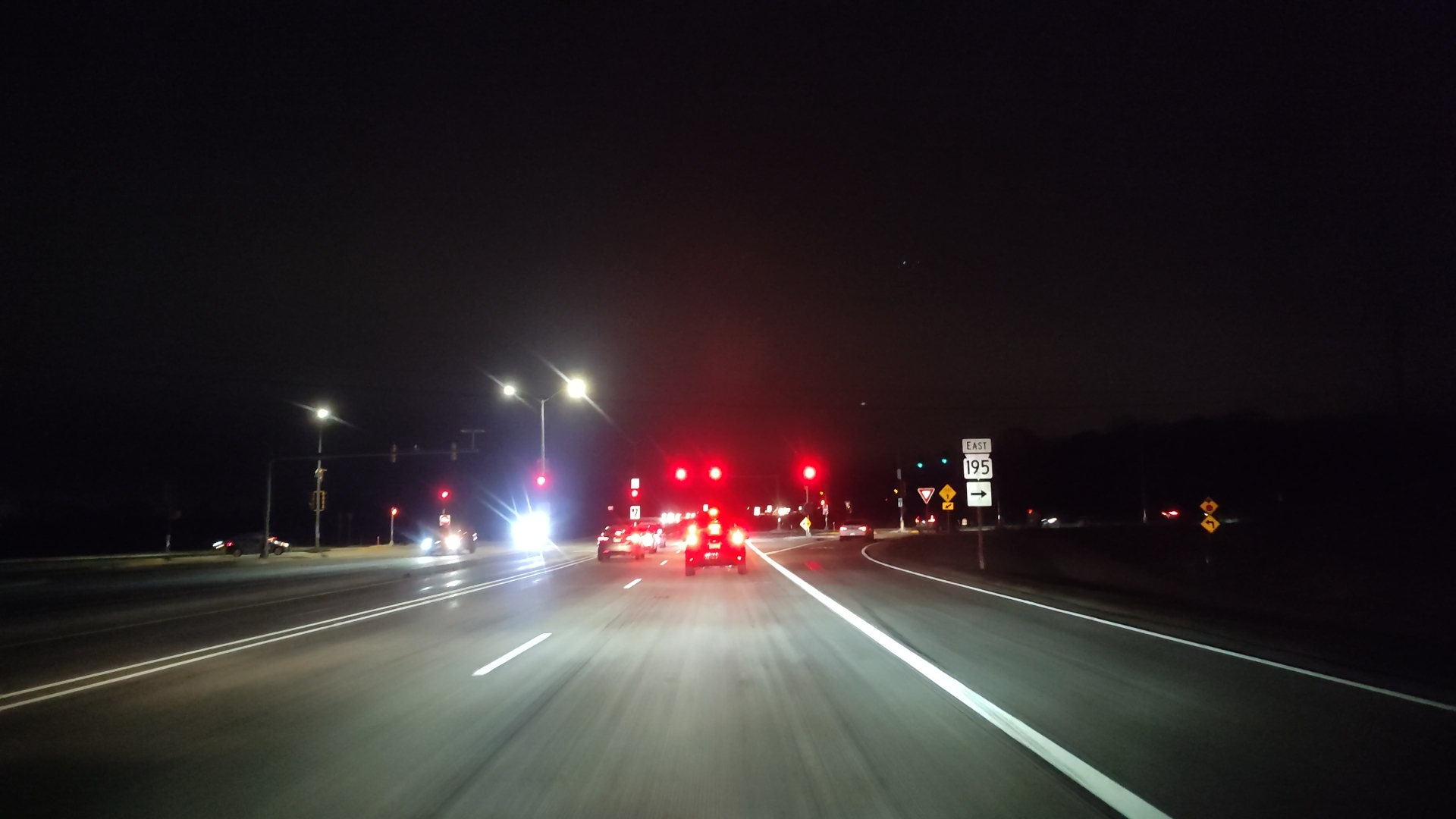
The intersection of WIS 31 with WIS 195

WIS 195 is a divided roadway from its western terminus to Old Green Bay Rd, including the intersections of WIS 311 and WIS 31, and an undivided two lane road east to WIS 32. The speed limit on the entire highway is 45 miles per hour.

== Major intersections ==
The entire highway is on the Somers–Mount Pleasant line and the Kenosha–Racine county line.

| mi | km | Destinations | Notes |
|---|---|---|---|
| 0.00– 0.19 | 0.00– 0.31 | I-41 / I-94 / US 41; CTH-KR | I-94 exit 337 |
| 0.61– 0.62 | 0.98– 1.00 | WIS 311 north (Wisconn Valley Way) | Southern terminus of WIS 311 |
| 4.39– 4.40 | 7.07– 7.08 | WIS 31 | |
| 7.48 | 12.04 | WIS 32 (Sheridan Road) | |
1.000 mi = 1.609 km; 1.000 km = 0.621 mi
