= WERO =

Coordinates: 35.3656°N 77.3930°W

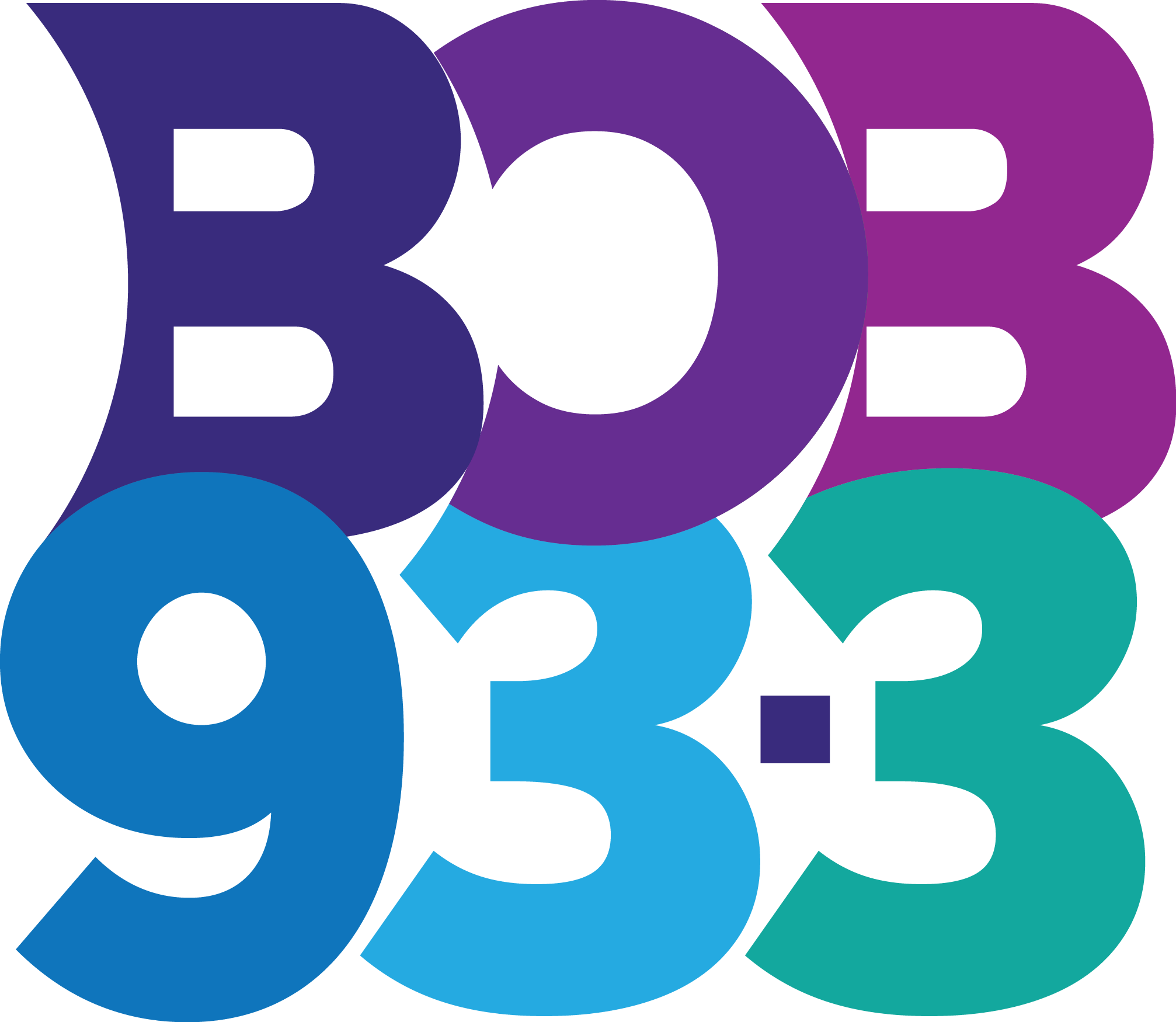
- Washington, North Carolina; United States
- Broadcast area: New Bern, North Carolina; Greenville, North Carolina; Jacksonville, North Carolina; Kinston, North Carolina
- Frequency: 93.3 MHz
- Branding: Bob 93-3

Programming
- Format: Contemporary hit radio
- Affiliations: Compass Media Networks; Premiere Networks

Ownership
- Owner: Dick Broadcasting; (Dick Broadcasting Company, Inc. of Tennessee)
- Sister stations: WQSL; WQZL; WXQR-FM; WRNS-FM

History
- First air date: 1962
- Former call signs: WITN-FM (1962–1985); WDLX (1985–1996); WERO (1996–2004); WBOB-FM (April 2004)
- Call sign meaning: phonetically similar to "arrow" (former branding)

Technical information
- Licensing authority: FCC
- Facility ID: 64609
- Class: C
- ERP: 100,000 watts
- HAAT: 543 meters (1,781 ft)

Links
- Public license information: Public file; LMS
- Webcast: Listen live
- Website: www.bob933.com

WERO (93.3 FM, "Bob 93-3") is a contemporary hit radio music formatted radio station for Eastern North Carolina licensed to Washington, North Carolina, US, targeting the Greenville, North Carolina, and Eastern North Carolina areas.

== History ==
The station began as WITN-FM, and by the late 1970s was a Top 40 station known as Rock 93, airing TM's automated "Stereo Rock" format. The station was owned by William Riley "Bill" Roberson Jr. and operated along with sister station WITN (930 AM) as the Tar Heel Broadcasting System. Roberson also owned the local TV station, WITN-TV (channel 7) and numerous other local properties such as the Dr. Pepper bottling plant, and Washington Square Mall. Around 1984, Roberson retired and began divesting these properties, selling some but leaving his son in law, Charles Zoph Potts and William Riley Roberson III in charge of WITN and WITN-FM. Potts and Roberson took the FM station to a live format in 1985, and changed to the 93DLX moniker, also known as the Hot FM. In 1991 the station went to a soft AC format. On February 19, 1996, the calls became WERO, and went to classic hits format as Arrow 93.3.

Also in 1996, major changes took place as Potts and Roberson sold their interest in the station to Pinnacle Broadcasting, which in 1999 became NextMedia Group.

In 1997, it dropped the Arrow and became known as WERO a 50/50 mix of the 1980s and 1990s, mixing in more of an adult album alternative format, all during this time it had some association with WITN-TV. The following year in 1999, it changed its branding to Bob 93.3 and flipped back to Top 40 music.

In 2004, NextMedia consolidated its radio operations to one central location in New Bern, North Carolina, as this station left behind the building just south of Washington where it had broadcast from since the 1950s.

In 2010, WERO operated on reduced power for a while as the station replaced an antenna that was 30 years old, an action which would increase the station's signal range.

NextMedia sold WERO and their 32 other radio stations to Digity, LLC for $85 million; the transaction was consummated on February 10, 2014.

Effective February 25, 2016, Digity and its 124 radio stations were acquired by Alpha Media for $264 million.

In December 2017, WERO and their former Digity stations were purchased by Dick Broadcasting of East Tennessee.

Some of the disc jockeys/on air personalities over the course of the stations history have been Gary Jackson, Sam Reynolds, Jack Boston, Alan Handelman, Shel Bynum, Bob Brannigan, George Micheals, Doug Moreland, Gary Lee, Charlie Byrd, Colleen Jackson, Tom the Jazz Man, Gina Gray, Todd Mitchell, Chris "Hollywood" Mann, Gare "The Spyder" Stevens, Doc Brown, J. Slater, Beth McCall, Brian Lane, Jay Stevens, Chris Kellogg, JJ, Gary O'Neal,Al "AC" Cannon, Beaver (Chris Michaels Smith), Jojo, Jamie, Bill O'Brien, Penny, Flave, Jagger, Helen Harvey, Harry Palm, "Swingin" Dick Richards, Austin (Moore) at Night.

In September 2017, Dick Broadcasting announced the purchase of Alpha Media stations in three markets — 18 stations and two translators in total, at a purchase price of $19.5 million. The acquisition of WERO by Dick Broadcasting was consummated on December 20, 2017.
