= WARU (AM) =

Radio station

DWARU

Peru, Indiana; United States
- Broadcast area: Peru, Indiana; Wabash, Indiana
- Frequency: 1600 kHz

Programming
- Format: Defunct (was Oldies)

Ownership
- Owner: Dream Weaver Marketing, LLC.
- Sister stations: WARU-FM

History
- First air date: 1954

Technical information
- Facility ID: 71276
- Class: D
- Power: 1,000 watts day 37 watts night
- Transmitter coordinates: 40°45′53.00″N 86°2′26.00″W

WARU (1600 AM) was a radio station broadcasting an oldies format. The station is licensed to Peru, Indiana, United States. The station was last owned by Dream Weaver Marketing, LLC. Its license was deleted on September 30, 2021.

== Technical ==
An Harris model SX-1A all solid state transmitter (featuring their patented "Polyphase" pulse duration modulator) fed a T-match network that provided impedance matching into a slant wire fed quarter wave monopole that was grounded at its base. A slant wire feed is an old grand-fathered (now obsolete) method that made it easier to install additional antennas on the tower without the need for the costly base insulator or isocouplers.
