= WQSL =

Coordinates: 34.520°N 77.447°W

- Jacksonville, North Carolina; United States
- Broadcast area: Jacksonville, North Carolina
- Frequency: 92.3 MHz
- Branding: 92.3 The River

Programming
- Format: Adult hits

Ownership
- Owner: Dick Broadcasting; (Dick Broadcasting Company, Inc. of Tennessee)
- Sister stations: WERO; WQZL; WRNS-FM; WXQR-FM

History
- First air date: November 1993 (as WFXZ)
- Former call signs: WFXZ (1991–1994)

Technical information
- Licensing authority: FCC
- Facility ID: 28171
- Class: C2
- ERP: 22,500 watts
- HAAT: 221 meters (725 ft)

Links
- Public license information: Public file; LMS
- Webcast: Listen live
- Website: rivernc.com

WQSL (92.3 FM), also known as "The River", is an adult hits radio station licensed to Jacksonville, North Carolina.

== History ==
WQSL was "Q92" when it was Top 40 and then it was a hot AC. In the early 1990s it was "Whistle 92.3". From 1995 to 2000 it was "All Hit 92.3". Then the station switched to hip hop.

On April 30, 1997, Cumulus Broadcasting announced its purchase of WAAV, WWQQ, WXQR, and WQSL.

WQSL was rhythmic CHR and its name was "The Beat of Carolina" until the end of 2006, at which time it changed to rhythmic adult contemporary with the name "The Party Station". At the end of 2007, WQSL changed to urban adult contemporary with The Touch format from ABC Radio Networks and the Rickey Smiley morning show.

On August 29, 2013, at noon, the station flipped to a stunt of 1960s-leaning classic hits as "Oldies 92" before flipping to an adult hits simulcast with WQZL as "92.3/101.1 Jack FM" at noon the following day.

On December 16, 2013, the station changed their format from adult hits to a country simulcast with WQZL, branded as "The Wolf".

In September 2017, Dick Broadcasting announced the purchase of Alpha Media stations in three markets — 18 stations and two translators in total, at a purchase price of $19.5 million. The acquisition of WQSL by Dick Broadcasting was consummated on December 20, 2017.

On July 6, 2018, WQSL changed their format from country to variety hits, branded as "92.3 & 101.1 The River".

In 2026, WQSL and WQZL began the process of separating its simulcast. On February 17, 2026, at 4:30 PM, WQSL switched off its old transmitter in Sneads Ferry, North Carolina, and began broadcasting at 100,000 watts from its new location in Holly Ridge, North Carolina. WQSL would continue its existing format and on February 20, 2026, WQZL signed off.
