= WSSR =

Radio station in Joliet, Illinois

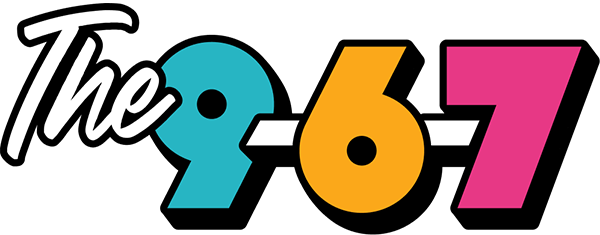
- Joliet, Illinois; United States
- Broadcast area: Chicago market
- Frequency: 96.7 MHz (HD Radio)
- Branding: The 9-6-7

Programming
- Format: Adult hits
- Subchannels: HD2: WJOL 1340 AM
- Affiliations: Westwood One

Ownership
- Owner: Connoisseur Media; (Alpha Media Licensee LLC)
- Sister stations: WCCQ; WERV-FM; WJOL; WXLC; WZSR

History
- First air date: February 6, 1960 (as WJOL-FM)
- Former call signs: WJOL-FM (1960–1974); WLLI-FM (1974–2004)

Technical information
- Licensing authority: FCC
- Facility ID: 62240
- Class: A
- ERP: 3,100 watts
- HAAT: 142 meters (466 ft)
- Transmitter coordinates: 41°36′1.1″N 87°58′44.2″W

Links
- Public license information: Public file; LMS
- Webcast: Listen live
- Website: the967.com

WSSR (96.7 FM) is a radio station licensed to Joliet, Illinois, United States, it serves South and West Suburban Chicago. The station is owned by Connoisseur Media, through licensee Alpha Media Licensee LLC. WSSR's studios are located in Crest Hill, and its transmitter is in Homer Glen, Illinois.

== History ==
=== WJOL-FM ===
The station first signed on the air on February 6, 1960, as WJOL-FM, sister station to AM 1340 WJOL. The station shared its studios and transmitter site with the AM in Joliet, where it broadcast with an ERP of 1,000 watts at a height above average terrain (HAAT) of 125 feet (38 m). Initially, WJOL-FM simulcast the programming of the AM part of the day, but aired beautiful music, classical music, and standards separate from the AM station during evening hours and weekends. The station was owned by Joseph Novy and Jerome Cerny.

By 1964, its programming was separate from its AM sister station, and the station was one of the first in the area to broadcast in stereo. That year, WJOL-AM-FM were sold to Publishing Enterprises, owned by Jack Harris and family, for $560,000. A year later, its ERP was increased to 3,000 watts and its HAAT was increased to 300 feet (91 m).

=== WLLI-FM ===
In 1974, the station's call letters were changed to WLLI, an anagram for Will County, the primary county in its coverage area, and it aired a country music format. Later that decade, the station switched to a MOR format, and then a top 40 format. By 1980, WLLI had returned to a MOR format.

In 1984, the station switched to a top 40/CHR format. In 1987, the station was sold to Joliet Broadcasting. It would shift to an adult rock format in early 1988, and was branded "96.7 I-Rock".

In early 1995, WLLI was sold to Barden Broadcasting, which changed the station's format to hot AC. On January 22, 1996, the station adopted a country format.

==== Will Rock ====
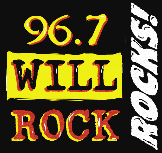
96.7 Will Rock's logo

In January 1997, WLLI adopted a rock format, and was branded "96.7 Will Rock Rocks!". Lonny Tyler was morning host and program director. During this time the station carried the Motor Racing Network broadcasts of what was then known as the Winston Cup Series.

In 1998, the station was sold to Pride Communications. In 2000, the station was sold to NextMedia Group.

=== Star 96.7 ===
On February 2, 2004, while playing "Welcome to the Jungle" by Guns N' Roses, the song started slowing down, until the song was cut halfway through. After 15 seconds of dead air and a minute of stunting with radio sounds, this led to the launch of the station's new adult contemporary format as "Star 96.7". The first song to air under the new branding and format was "Lucky Star" by Madonna. The "Star" branded adult contemporary format had previously aired on 93.5 WJTW, but the station was sold to HBC and flipped to a Spanish language format, as WVIX. On February 9, 2004, WLLI-FM's call sign was changed to WSSR.

In 2008, WSSR moved its transmitting antenna from Joliet (where it was co-located on WJOL's tower) to a 350-foot (110 m) tower located at 159th Street & Cedar Road in Homer Glen. The move solidified the stations signal coverage in the I-88 and I-355 corridor as well as the southwest suburbs.

WSSR and NextMedia's 32 other radio stations were sold to Digity, LLC for $85 million; the transaction was consummated on February 10, 2014. Effective February 25, 2016, Digity, LLC and its 124 radio stations were acquired by Alpha Media for $264 million. Alpha Media merged with Connoisseur Media on September 4, 2025.

Scott Childers joined WSSR in 2008 as afternoon drive host, and became program director in 2012. In April 2019, Childers was replaced in his weekday afternoon and evening shift by Eddie Volkman.

=== The 9-6-7 ===
On March 20, 2026, at 10 a.m., after playing "Shivers" by Ed Sheeran, WSSR began stunting with a broad soft adult contemporary playlist, with cryptic sweepers stating the station was "on hold" and that the "wait" would end at 10 a.m. the following Monday, March 23.

On the day promised at 6 a.m. (four hours ahead of the reported launch time), the station relaunched with an adult hits format, focusing on pop music from the 90s and 2000s with select 80s songs and recent titles, as "The 9-6-7", with the entire "Star" airstaff retained. The first song under the new format was "Larger than Life" by The Backstreet Boys.

== HD programming ==
WSSR transmits in HD Radio and provides a multicast (extra) channel, which carries sister station WJOL on HD 2. The main HD channel, HD 1 simulcasts the over-the-air (analog) channel.
