= WQZL =

Currently silent
- Belhaven, North Carolina; United States
- Broadcast area: Greenville, and New Bern
- Frequency: 101.1 MHz

Ownership
- Owner: Dick Broadcasting; (Dick Broadcasting Company, Inc. of Tennessee)
- Sister stations: WERO; WQSL; WRNS-FM; WXQR-FM

History
- First air date: 1981 (as WKJA-FM)
- Former call signs: WKJA-FM (1981–1999); WANJ (1999–2002)

Technical information
- Licensing authority: FCC
- Facility ID: 47883
- Class: C2
- ERP: 50,000 watts
- HAAT: 185 meters (607 ft)
- Transmitter coordinates: 35°18′18″N 76°45′45″W

Links
- Public license information: Public file; LMS

WQZL (101.1 FM) is a radio station licensed to serve Belhaven, North Carolina which is currently silent. It last had a format of adult hits as "92.3 & 101.1 The River", in a simulcast with WQSL. The station's antenna is in Washington, but the signal reaches New Bern, Greenville, and Washington, North Carolina.

== History ==
WKJA-FM signed on June 1, 1981, at 92.1 FM. The original effective radiated power was 3000 watts.

WKJA-FM was originally licensed to Roach Communications, Robert Ray "Bob" Roach, President. The original format was light contemporary hit radio, but adult contemporary and country formats also took occasional turns throughout the 1980s. The station was sold to Winfas in 1984, whose other holdings at the time included WRCM and WJNC in Jacksonville, North Carolina, and WAMV and WCNV in Amherst, Virginia.

WKJA used to play oldies in the early 1990s, and then rebroadcast the signal of adult standards station WANG-FM. In 1999, it took the WANJ calls to reflect its association with WANG-FM. In 2002, WANJ began simulcasting with WQSL, taking the WQZL calls; both stations first had a rhythmic CHR under the moniker of "The Beat of Carolina", this was later tweaked to a more rhythmic AC format. They later flipped formats to "The Touch FM", an urban adult contemporary format.

In August 2010, WQZL severed ties with WQSL after eight years and began simulcasting sister rock station WXQR, giving it coverage in the inland sections of the Greenville-New Bern-Jacksonville area (WXQR serves mostly the coastal regions). On January 2, 2012, WQZL flipped to variety hits using the "S.A.M.: Simply About Music" format and calling itself "101.1 SAM FM"; "S.A.M." was previously heard on WSSM. This was the first time since the 1990s WQZL had not simulcast with another station. After 19 months, the station would flip back to a simulcast with WQSL on August 29, 2013, as 92.3/101.1 Jack FM. The simulcast started at 12 noon with a stunt as a 1960s-based oldies format as Oldies 92 before introducing Jack at 12 Noon the next day. As with most Jack FM stations, WQZL had no air personalities.

On December 16, 2013, WQZL and WQZL changed their format to country, branded as "The Wolf".

In September 2017, Dick Broadcasting announced the purchase of Alpha Media stations in three markets — 18 stations and two translators in total, at a purchase price of $19.5 million. The acquisition of WQZL by Dick Broadcasting was consummated on December 20, 2017.

On July 6, 2018, at 5 pm, WQZL and WQSL changed their format from country to variety hits, branded as "92.3 & 101.1 The River".

In 2026, WQZL separated from WQSL, with a format yet to be announced. On February 23, 2026, WQZL filed for special temporary authority to go silent.
