= WJOL =

Radio station in Joliet, Illinois

Coordinates: 41°32′6.1″N 88°3′15.2″W

- Joliet, Illinois; United States
- Broadcast area: Southwest Suburban Chicago
- Frequency: 1340 kHz
- Branding: 1340 WJOL

Programming
- Format: News talk/sports
- Affiliations: ABC News Radio; Fox Sports Radio; Compass Media Networks; Premiere Networks

Ownership
- Owner: Connoisseur Media; (Alpha Media Licensee LLC)
- Sister stations: WCCQ; WERV-FM; WKRS; WSSR; WXLC; WZSR

History
- First air date: May 1925
- Former call signs: WJBI (1925); WCLS (1925–1945)
- Former frequencies: 1400 kHz (1924–1927); 1390 kHz (1927–1928); 1310 kHz (1928–1941)
- Call sign meaning: Joliet

Technical information
- Licensing authority: FCC
- Facility ID: 62235
- Class: C
- Power: 1,000 watts unlimited

Links
- Public license information: Public file; LMS
- Webcast: Listen live
- Website: www.wjol.com

WJOL (1340 AM) is a radio station broadcasting a news talk/sports format. Licensed to Joliet, Illinois, United States, the station is owned by Connoisseur Media, through licensee Alpha Media Licensee LLC. WJOL carries a variety of local programming, as well as nationally syndicated shows. WJOL's studios are located in Crest Hill, and its transmitter site is in Joliet.

== History ==
The station was first licensed on May 27, 1925, as WJBI, to Harold M. Couch at 104 Summitt Street in Peoria, for 100 watts on 1400 kHz. Later that year, the station was sold to the parent company of the Boston Store (a Joliet-based store unrelated to the Wisconsin Boston Stores), which changed the call sign to WCLS, standing for "Will County's Largest Store". WCLS operated a limited number of hours, sharing its frequency with other stations.

Following the establishment of the Federal Radio Commission (FRC), stations were initially issued a series of temporary authorizations starting on May 3, 1927, and later that year, WCLS's frequency was changed to 1390 kHz. In addition, stations were informed that if they wanted to continue operating, they needed to file a formal license application by January 15, 1928, as the first step in determining whether they met the new "public interest, convenience, or necessity" standard. On May 25, 1928, the FRC issued General Order 32, which notified 164 stations, including WCLS, that "From an examination of your application for future license it does not find that public interest, convenience, or necessity would be served by granting it." However, the station successfully convinced the commission that it should remain licensed.

On November 11, 1928, the FRC made a major reallocation of station transmitting frequencies, as part of a reorganization resulting from its implementation of General Order 40. WCLS was assigned to 1310 kHz, with its power reduced to 100 watts, initially sharing time with four other stations. In 1930 the timesharing was reduced to just one other station, WKBB, which ended in 1934, with WCLS's operation changed to "specified hours", after WKBB moved to a new frequency. On March 29, 1941, WCLS, along with most of the stations on 1310 kHz, moved to 1340 kHz, its location ever since, with its power increased to 250 watts, as part of the implementation of the North American Regional Broadcasting Agreement.

In 1945, the station's call sign was changed from WCLS to WJOL, and in 1962 the daytime power was increased to 1,000 watts. In the early 1960s, WJOL adopted a Top 40 format and published a local Top 50 record chart. In early 1985, the station's nighttime power was increased to 1,000 watts. At the time, the station aired an adult contemporary format. During the 1990s, it aired formats of news/talk, oldies, and classic hits. It became a full-time news/talk station by 2001.

Previous logo

== WJOL alumni ==
Notable radio personalities that have worked at WJOL include Frank O'Leary, Don Ladas, Kevin Kollins, Bill Drilling, Art Hellyer, Bob Zak, Don Beno, Tony Ray, Ralph Sherman Sr., Jerry Halasz, Max Carey, Ron Gleason, Joe Tippett, John Dempsey, Bob Wheeler and Ruth Stevens, who did a radio show from her record shop and was the first black woman on the station. While working at the station during its WCLS era, sportscaster Harry Caray adopted his on-air professional name which he would use for the rest of his career.

From 1947 to 1950, novelist William Johnston worked as a news reporter for WJOL.
