= WCCQ =

Radio station in Crest Hill, Illinois

- Crest Hill, Illinois; United States
- Broadcast area: Joliet, Illinois
- Frequency: 98.3 MHz
- Branding: Free Country 98.3 & 102.3

Programming
- Format: Country
- Affiliations: Westwood One

Ownership
- Owner: Connoisseur Media; (Alpha Media Licensee LLC)
- Sister stations: WERV-FM; WJOL; WKRS; WSSR; WXLC; WZSR

History
- First air date: January 28, 1976

Technical information
- Licensing authority: FCC
- Facility ID: 10677
- Class: A
- ERP: 3,000 watts
- HAAT: 142 meters (466 ft)
- Transmitter coordinates: 41°26′7.1″N 88°11′0.2″W
- Repeater: 102.3 WXLC (Waukegan)

Links
- Public license information: Public file; LMS
- Webcast: Listen live
- Website: www.freecountrychicago.com

WCCQ (98.3 FM) is a radio station broadcasting a country music format. Licensed to Crest Hill, Illinois, United States, it serves the Joliet area. The station is owned by Connoisseur Media. WCCQ's studios are located in Crest Hill, and its transmitter is in Channahon, Illinois.

== History ==
WCCQ began broadcasting on January 28, 1976, and originally aired an oldies format. In February 1979, the station adopted a beautiful music format.

WCCQ adopted a country format in 1984, and was branded "Q-Country". Bob Zak was the station's first morning host. Other announcers included Mark Edwards, Ted Clark, Larry Watts, Mike Baker, Jim Beedle, Bill Fortune, and Jim Felbinger.

The current lineup features Roy & Carol in the morning (since 1994), Geno Brien middays (former morning show host of 95.9 the River) and Todd Boss (The Bossman) doing afternoons. Other weekend and fill-in personalities include Rich Renik (from WMAQ and WUSN), Brandon Jones, Jillian, and Laura Vaughn. In April 2011, it became one of the two Chicago-area stations to broadcast NASCAR Cup Series races.

In January 2018, WCCQ shifted to a gold-based traditional country format—featuring an emphasis on songs from artists active during the 1990s and early 2000s. This change differentiates WCCQ from the mainstream lean of its competitors WEBG and WUSN.

On May 24, 2024, WCCQ rebranded as "Free Country 98.3 & 102.3", adding a simulcast on WXLC in Waukegan.
