= William Johnston (novelist) =

American writer

- Born: William Joseph Johnston; January 11, 1924; Lincoln, Illinois, U.S.
- Died: October 15, 2010 (aged 86); San Jose, California, U.S.
- Other names: Susan Claudia, Alex Steele, Matt Lincoln, Ed Garth, William Howard
- Occupation: Novelist
- Years active: 1960–1979
- Spouse: Anne Korba (m. 1953)

William Joseph Johnston (January 11, 1924 – October 15, 2010) was an American novelist, primarily known for authoring tie-in novels, although he also wrote non-fiction books and novels unrelated to specific motion pictures or television series.

== Biography ==
Johnston was born on January 11, 1924, in Lincoln, Illinois. He was the son of John and Lucille (Shoup) Johnston, and he attended high school in Springfield, Illinois.

During the World War II, William Johnston served in the Pacific Theater as a radio operator and gunner in the U.S. Navy Air Corps (1942–1945).

On October 24, 1953, Johnston married Anne Korba, an executive secretary. The couple had five children: Phillip Susan, Peter, Thomas, and Kelly. Johnston and his family resided in Massapequa, New York.

== Writing career ==
After World War II, Johnston worked as a disc jockey at radio station WTAX in Springfield, Illinois.

From 1947-1950, Johnston worked as a news reporter for WJOL. He worked as a press agent for Tex McCrary's public relations agency from 1950-1960. During his time working for Tex McCrary, he handled the Lionel trains account. For two years, Johnston served as the associate editor for The Lion—the magazine for the Lions Clubs International. Beginning in 1960, Johnston worked as a free-lance author.

During the span of 1960-1979, Johnston wrote magazine articles and over 100 books, including original novels, movie and TV tie-in novels, and non-fiction. Some of Johnston's tie-in novels involve cartoon characters, and characters from comic strips and comic books. on Johnston wrote novels based on popular television series such as The Munsters, Bewitched, The Flying Nun, Get Smart, The Brady Bunch, Nanny and the Professor, Room 222, Happy Days, and Welcome Back Kotter. Many of Johnston's television tie-in novels were related to sitcoms, but he worked in other genres—except for science fiction.

In contrast to more recent tie-in novelists—who have access to email, fax machines, video recorders, computers, photocopying, and other electronic communications—Johnston and other writers of his era wrote their novels on typewriters and had little access to in-depth information on the shows that were the subject of these novels. Communication was by telephone and regular mail, and these novelists watched the programs on television—just like the viewer at home. These tie-in novelists may have had access to some scripts and possibly some film of the television shows from which to work, but they had little else. Although most television series production took place in California, most of the major publishers were located in New York, as they remain today. This distance made it difficult for novelists and editors to get information from the television production companies on characters, plots, locations, and other aspects of the television programs themselves. In addition, tie-in novelists had to work quickly on their books, and had the challenge of developing characters, plots, and dialogue that related closely enough to the original programs, so as to match the expectations of the readers/television viewers. Generally, Johnston worked quickly and could capture critical elements of the TV shows that he wrote about in his novels.

Johnston's novels not related to film or television tended to be written for adults and frequently had ribald themes.

Johnston was represented by the Scott Meredith Literary Agency, Inc. Johnston did not work exclusively for any one publisher, although he published frequently with Lancer, Tempo, Ace, and Whitman. Tempo marketed its books, including those books that Johnston authored, to children and adolescents. Whitman published books for younger children.

Unlike other authors who desired fame, Johnston preferred obscurity. In his article announcing Johnston as the recipient of the Faust Award, David Spencer described Johnston as, "legendary and until now somewhat elusive..." In its entry for Johnston, Contemporary Authors Online includes this quote from him: "I am interested only in writing entertaining stories and remaining as anonymous as possible."

Johnston occasionally used pseudonyms such as the name Susan Claudia for Gothic romance stories. They Came From the Sea (1969) based on the Television series The New People was published under the name Alex Steele Johnston wrote two novels based on the Matt Lincoln television medical drama, The Revolutionist (1970) and The Hostage (1971) using the author name Ed Garth. Johnston also employed a pseudonym, William Howard, for his last book, a novelization of the Bob Guccione-produced film Caligula. Given the controversies related to the movie and given Johnston's association with tie-in novels and younger audiences, Spencer feels that the Johnston chose to use a pseudonym to avoid attracting younger readers to the book.

== Critical appraisal ==
Johnston's novels have attracted little critical attention, although they are well documented in bibliographies by Larson, Peer, and in Contemporary Authors.

Tie-in novels, while popular with readers and profitable for publishers, generally do not attract serious criticism and scholarship. Indeed, they are often dismissed as literature.

During his career, Johnston's novels were infrequently reviewed. For example, Johnston wrote the novelization of a 1978 made-for-TV movie about Martin Luther King Jr., and it received a brief review in Library Journal. The review was generally negative.

Johnston's novels have attracted attention from blog writers who deal with popular culture. For example Morgan wrote about Johnston's Nanny and the Professor, but he felt that Johnston's books had little to do with the spirit and content of the original television series, whereas Caputo felt that Johnston's Fantastic Four novel was consistent with the style in the Marvel comic books.

Johnston's peers have praised Johnston's work as a tie-in novelist, but they seem equally impressed by the sheer number of tie-in novels he produced.

== Retirement and death ==
Johnston retired from writing and, while living in Long Island, went to a school for bartending. Unsuccessful in finding a job in this field due to his age, Johnston opened his own bar, The Blind Pig, in Massapequa, and he ran it successfully.

After running The Blind Pig, Johnston retired a second time, and moved to San Jose, California. It was during his residence in San Jose that he received the Grand Master Scribe Award -- Faust Award—from the International Association of Media Tie-in Writers.

Johnston died in San Jose on October 15, 2010.

== Awards ==
Best First Novel—Edgar Award (1960) -- Mystery Writers of America (awarded for The Marriage Cage (Lyle Stuart, reissued in paperback by Dell)).

Grand Master Scribe Award -- Faust Award (2010) -- International Association of Media Tie-in Writers.
