= WBKZ =

- Havelock, North Carolina; United States
- Frequency: 105.1 MHz
- Branding: Air1

Programming
- Format: Worship music
- Affiliations: Air1

Ownership
- Owner: Educational Media Foundation

History
- Former call signs: WKVO-FM (1971–1978); WMSQ (1978–1996); WANG (1996–1999); WANG-FM (1999–2005); WKOO (2005); WSSM (2005–2008); WRQR (2008); WSSM (2008–2010); WLVG (2010–2018); WHAR (2018–2024)

Technical information
- Licensing authority: FCC
- Facility ID: 47106
- Class: C3
- ERP: 18,500 watts
- HAAT: 117 meters (384 ft)
- Transmitter coordinates: 34°45′7.6″N 76°52′55.8″W

Links
- Public license information: Public file; LMS
- Webcast: Listen Live
- Website: air1.com

WBKZ (105.1 FM) is a radio station broadcasting a Christian worship format branded as Air1. WBKZ is licensed to Havelock, North Carolina. The station was sold in 2010 by NM Licensing LLC. The station is owned by the Educational Media Foundation.

== History ==
The station was assigned the call sign WKVO-FM in 1971, and was sold to MusicRadio, Inc., a Maryland-based group, who changed the call sign to WMSQ ("Q105") in 1978. The station proved to be a valuable asset to the town of Havelock and the nearby Marine Air Station at Cherry Point during several hurricanes in the 1980s. Havelock's business "golden age" peaked during the station's successful years from 1979 to 1990, partly due to the community involvement of its management and on-air personalities.

Arbitron ratings consistently saw the small station competing with much more powerful FM stations in nearby New Bern and Washington.

On August 15, 1996, the station changed its call sign to WANG, and switched to country music; the call sign was modified to WANG-FM on January 22, 1999. Later, WANG-FM switched to adult standards. The station switched briefly to Westwood One oldies; in April 2005, the call sign changed to WKOO ("Kool 105.1"). On June 13, 2005, the station changed to the Westwood One "Sam FM" adult hits format; the call sign changed to WSSM on June 21, 2005.

In October 2006, WSSM returned to Dial Global's adult staandards format "America's Best Music". In late April 2008, WSSM returned to the SAM "Simply About Music" adult hits format.

On May 27, 2010, WSSM ceased operation as it changed formats when sold by NextMedia Group under new ownership and changed its call sign to WLVG.

On April 16, 2018, the station changed its call sign to WHAR. On March 28, 2024, the station changed its call sign to WBKZ.
