= WHBC (AM) =

Radio station in Canton, Ohio

- Canton, Ohio; United States
- Broadcast area: Canton-Massillon Metropolitan Area
- Frequency: 1480 kHz
- Branding: News/Talk 1480 WHBC

Programming
- Language: English
- Format: Talk and sports
- Affiliations: Fox News Radio

Ownership
- Owner: Connoisseur Media; (Alpha Media Licensee LLC)
- Sister stations: WHBC-FM

History
- First air date: March 9, 1925

Technical information
- Licensing authority: FCC
- Facility ID: 4489
- Class: B
- Power: 15,000 watts (day); 5,000 watts (night)
- Transmitter coordinates: 40°53′51.2″N 81°19′9.4″W (day); 40°43′15.2″N 81°26′27.4″W (night)

Links
- Public license information: Public file; LMS
- Webcast: Listen live
- Website: www.whbc.com

WHBC (1480 kHz) is an AM radio station in Canton, Ohio, owned by Connoisseur Media. It has a mixed talk and sports radio format, supplemented with sports play-by-play. Its studios and offices are in the historic WHBC Building at 550 Market Avenue South in downtown Canton, the station's location for over 60 years. WHBC is a Primary Entry Point for the Emergency Alert System.

WHBC is one of about a total of 40 AM radio stations in the U.S. with separate transmitter sites for daytime and nighttime broadcasting. It always uses directional antennas. The station's daytime transmitter is northeast of Canton, off Diamond Street near Middlebranch Road. It is powered at 15,000 watts, using a four-tower array. Its nighttime transmitter is southwest of Canton, off Gooding Street near the intersection of Sherman Church Avenue and Fohl Street. It is powered at 5,000 watts, using a five-tower array.

== History ==
=== Beginnings ===
WHBC is the oldest radio station in Canton. It got its first license on February 13, 1925. The original owner was Father Edward P. Graham of the St. John Catholic Church at 627 McKinley Avenue, N.W. WHBC began broadcasting on March 9, 1925, and operated on 1180 kHz with 100 watts. The call letters were randomly assigned from a sequential roster of available call signs. By the middle of 1927, the station had moved to 1270 kHz.

Following the establishment of the Federal Radio Commission (FRC), stations were initially issued a series of temporary authorizations starting on May 3, 1927. In addition, they were informed that if they wanted to continue operating, they needed to file a formal license application by January 15, 1928, as the first step in determining whether they met the new "public interest, convenience, or necessity" standard. On May 25, 1928, the FRC issued General Order 32, which notified 164 stations, including WHBC, that "From an examination of your application for future license it does not find that public interest, convenience, or necessity would be served by granting it." However, the station successfully convinced the commission that it should remain licensed.

On November 11, 1928, the FRC implemented a major reallocation of station transmitting frequencies, as part of a reorganization resulting from its implementation of General Order 40. WHBC was assigned to 1200 kHz.

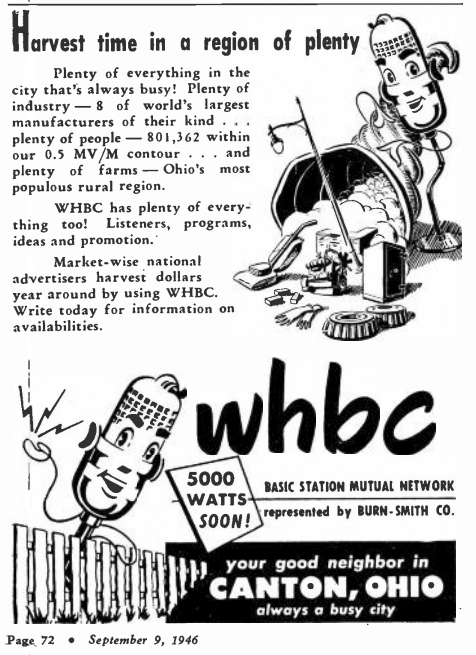
1946 station advertisement.

=== New ownership ===
In 1936 the station was sold to secular interests, when it was purchased by Brush-Moore Newspapers, then owners of Canton's daily newspaper, The Repository. The station was sold in 1939 to a business group consisting of the Vodrey family of East Liverpool and the Boyd family of Portsmouth. The families organized ownership of the station under the name of the Ohio Broadcasting Company. They obtained approval to increase power to 250 watts daytime, while maintaining 100 watts at night. The station was not a part of any network until 1940 or 1941 when it became a Mutual Broadcasting System network affiliate. It became an ABC affiliate later in the 1940s.

On March 29, 1941, it was required to change frequencies due to the North American Regional Broadcasting Agreement (NARBA). WHBC moved from 1200 to 1230 kHz. It moved to its present frequency of 1480 kHz on June 4, 1944, when WGAR AM in Cleveland moved from 1480 to 1220. The station obtained an FM license in 1948 and established WHBC-FM on 94.1 MHz. WHBC-FM still operates using those call letters and remains the sister station to WHBC 1480.

In September 1947, WHBC's power increased from 1 kW to 5 kW. At that time, it was affiliated with both the ABC and Mutual networks. Its 5 kW would remain for decades until its upgrade to 15 kW in October 1996.

On November 22, 1963, WHBC's afternoon talk show "Bee Line" was interrupted at 1:41 pm for a bulletin from ABC News concerning the assassination of John F. Kennedy. The program was preserved on audio tape and can be found on the internet.

On September 26, 1967, the ownership was reorganized as WHBC, Inc., which changed its name to Beaverkettle Company on September 13, 1972. The Vodreys purchased WFIR in Roanoke, Virginia, in 1969. They sold the station eight years later. In June 2000, the family-owned Beaverkettle Company sold WHBC and WHBC-FM to NextMedia for more than 42 million dollars. This ended 61 years of Vodrey family ownership of the stations.

=== Market dominance ===
For many years, WHBC was the only full-time AM station in Canton. The stations on 900, 1060, and 1520 kHz were all daytimers, as also were 990 in Massillon and 1310 in Alliance. They were all required to go off the air at sunset, while WHBC continued broadcasting. (All but 1060 and 1520 were later granted modest night power under changes in the FCC rules). As such, WHBC enjoyed enviable dominance in the Canton radio market, although stations from Akron and Cleveland could also be heard.

During its later years as a full-service station, the station had a MOR music format during the 1970s, plus 19 hours of urban music per week which also had its own music surveys, but that was later dropped by the end of the decade. The station's music format was upgraded to adult contemporary in the late-1970s and remained as an AC station until the mid-1990s. WHBC was an affiliation of the ABC Entertainment Network during its longtime adult contemporary music run. Aside of its music programming, 27 hours of news programming were added each week during the early-1990s, and more talk and sports shows began filling in later in the decade.

On March 26, 2007, WHBC ended its long-running Full Service format mixing talk with oldies music. It became a full-time talk station, eliminating its remaining music dayparts. The station also broadcasts a show known as "Tradio", a program where listeners can call in and sell items to other listeners, which lasted for several years.

WHBC was one of the first radio stations to stream live play-by-play coverage of the Massillon Tigers and Canton McKinley high school football game over the Internet during the 1997 football season. People from all parts of the United States and the world were able to listen to the game live via the Internet.

In 2014, NextMedia sold WHBC, WHBC-FM and the company's 31 other radio stations to Digity, LLC. The price tag was $85 million. The transaction was consummated on February 10, 2014.

In November 2014, 20-year veteran sports host Sam Bourquin ended his relationship with the station, after an announcement on WHBC.com and on WHBC's Facebook page. The station attempted to move Bourquin to a slot in WHBC's morning show, where former Sports Director Jim Johnson had spent the bulk of his career before he retired.

Effective February 25, 2016, Digity and its 124 radio stations were acquired by Alpha Media for $264 million. Alpha Media merged with Connoisseur Media on September 4, 2025.

== Programming ==
Local hosts on WHBC include Pam Cook in morning drive and Kenny Roda in afternoons. The station is also an affiliate of Westwood One Sports and Fox News Radio.

The station carries Cleveland Browns football and Cleveland Guardians baseball as well as the Ohio State Sports Network. Local high school football is also heard during the fall season.
