= WHBC-FM =

Radio station in Canton, Ohio

- Canton, Ohio; United States
- Broadcast area: Canton metropolitan area; Akron metropolitan area
- Frequency: 94.1 MHz
- Branding: Mix 94-1 Canton

Programming
- Language: English
- Format: Hot adult contemporary
- Affiliations: Cleveland Browns; Compass Media Networks; Skyview Networks; United Stations Radio Networks

Ownership
- Owner: Connoisseur Media; (Alpha Media Licensee LLC)
- Sister stations: WHBC

History
- First air date: February 2, 1948

Technical information
- Licensing authority: FCC
- Facility ID: 4488
- Class: B
- ERP: 45,000 watts
- HAAT: 157 meters (515 ft)
- Transmitter coordinates: 40.898°N 81.318°W

Links
- Public license information: Public file; LMS
- Webcast: Listen live; Listen live (via Audacy); Listen live (via iHeartRadio)
- Website: www.mix941.com

WHBC-FM (94.1 MHz Mix 94-1) is a commercial radio station in Canton, Ohio. It has a hot adult contemporary format and is owned by Connoisseur Media. The studios and offices are on Market Avenue South at 6th Street in Canton. WHBC-FM is a Primary Entry Point for the Emergency Alert System.

WHBC-FM is a Class B station. It has an effective radiated power (ERP) of 45,000 watts. The transmitter is off Diamond Street NE near Middlebranch Avenue NE in Canton.

== History ==
WHBC-FM signed on the air on February 2, 1948. It has always had the WHBC-FM call sign and is the sister station of WHBC (1480 AM). It its early years, WHBC-FM largely simulcast the AM station. The two stations were network affiliates of ABC Radio.

In the 1960s and 1970s, WHBC-FM aired a beautiful music format, using reel to reel tapes. It was mostly automated, playing quarter-hour sweeps of instrumental cover versions of popular adult hits, Broadway and Hollywood show tunes.

In the 1980s, the instrumentals were gradually dropped and WHBC-FM shifted to soft adult contemporary music. On July 5, 1990, the station gradually morphed into adult contemporary, and by 2007, the station gradually morphed again to modern adult contemporary, and in later years moved to an Adult Top 40 sound. Mediabase reports the station as a hot adult contemporary.

On October 4, 2023, the station announced former midday host Matt Fantone would be returning to WHBC-FM. He would take over morning drive time with Mix Mornings. Previously WHBC-FM spent five years of running syndicated programming in the wake-up time slot.
