= Wisconsin Highway 31 =

State highway in Wisconsin, United States

State Trunk Highway 31
- WIS 31 highlighted in red

Route information
- Maintained by WisDOT
- Length: 22.86 mi (36.79 km)

Major junctions
- South end: IL 131 in Pleasant Prairie
- WIS 165 in Pleasant Prairie; WIS 50 in Kenosha; WIS 158 in Kenosha; WIS 195 in Somers; WIS 11 in Sturtevant; WIS 20 in Mount Pleasant; WIS 38 in Mount Pleasant
- North end: WIS 32 / LMCT in Caledonia

Location
- Country: United States
- State: Wisconsin
- Counties: Kenosha, Racine

Highway system
- Wisconsin State Trunk Highway System; Interstate; US; State; Scenic; Rustic
← WIS 30	→ WIS 32

State Trunk Highway 31 (often called Highway 31, STH-31 or WIS 31) is a 22.86-mile (36.79 km) state highway in Kenosha and Racine counties in the US state of Wisconsin that runs north–south as a suburban route passing Racine and Kenosha. With the exception of a two-mile (3.2 km) stretch between Four Mile Road and WIS 32 at the north end, WIS 31 is a multi-lane urban highway.

== Route description ==
WIS 31 begins at the Illinois state line where it connects to Illinois Route 131 (IL 131), following Green Bay Road to its junction through Pleasant Prairie. The highway briefly passes through the northwestern part of Kenosha. WIS 50 and WIS 158 cross WIS 31 in Kenosha. WIS 31 passes along the west side of University of Wisconsin–Parkside one mile (1.6 km) south of the Racine County line. In the Racine area, WIS 31 crosses WIS 11, WIS 20 and WIS 38, turning onto Ole Davidson Road in Caledonia. Green Bay Road, named after the historic route connecting Chicago with Milwaukee and Green Bay, has been upgraded to four-lane divided highway for the entire length. Ole Davidson Road has been upgraded to a divided highway from the split with North Green Bay Road to Four Mile Road.

== Major intersections ==
County	Location	mi	km	Destinations	Notes
Kenosha	Pleasant Prairie	0.00	0.00	IL 131 south Russell Road	Roadway continues as IL 131
Kenosha	Pleasant Prairie	2.06	3.32	WIS 165 (104th Street)	
Kenosha	Kenosha	5.13	8.26	WIS 50 (75th Street)	
Kenosha	Kenosha	6.17	9.93	CTH-K (60th Street)	
Kenosha	Kenosha	6.68	10.75	WIS 158 (52nd Street)	
Kenosha	Somers	10.26	16.51	CTH-E (12th Street)	
Kenosha	Somers	12.30	19.79	WIS 195 (1st Street)	
Racine	Sturtevant	14.50	23.34	WIS 11 (Durand Avenue)	
Racine	Mount Pleasant	16.04	25.81	WIS 20 (Washington Avenue)	
Racine	Mount Pleasant	17.34	27.91	CTH-C (Spring Street)	
Racine	Mount Pleasant	18.60	29.93	WIS 38 (Northwestern Avenue)	
Racine	Caledonia	22.86	36.79	WIS 32 (Douglas Avenue) / LMCT – Oak Creek, Milwaukee, Racine, Kenosha	
1.000 mi = 1.609 km; 1.000 km = 0.621 mi
