= WXLC =

Radio station in Waukegan, Illinois

Coordinates: 42.349760°N 87.881425°W

Simulcasting WCCQ Crest Hill
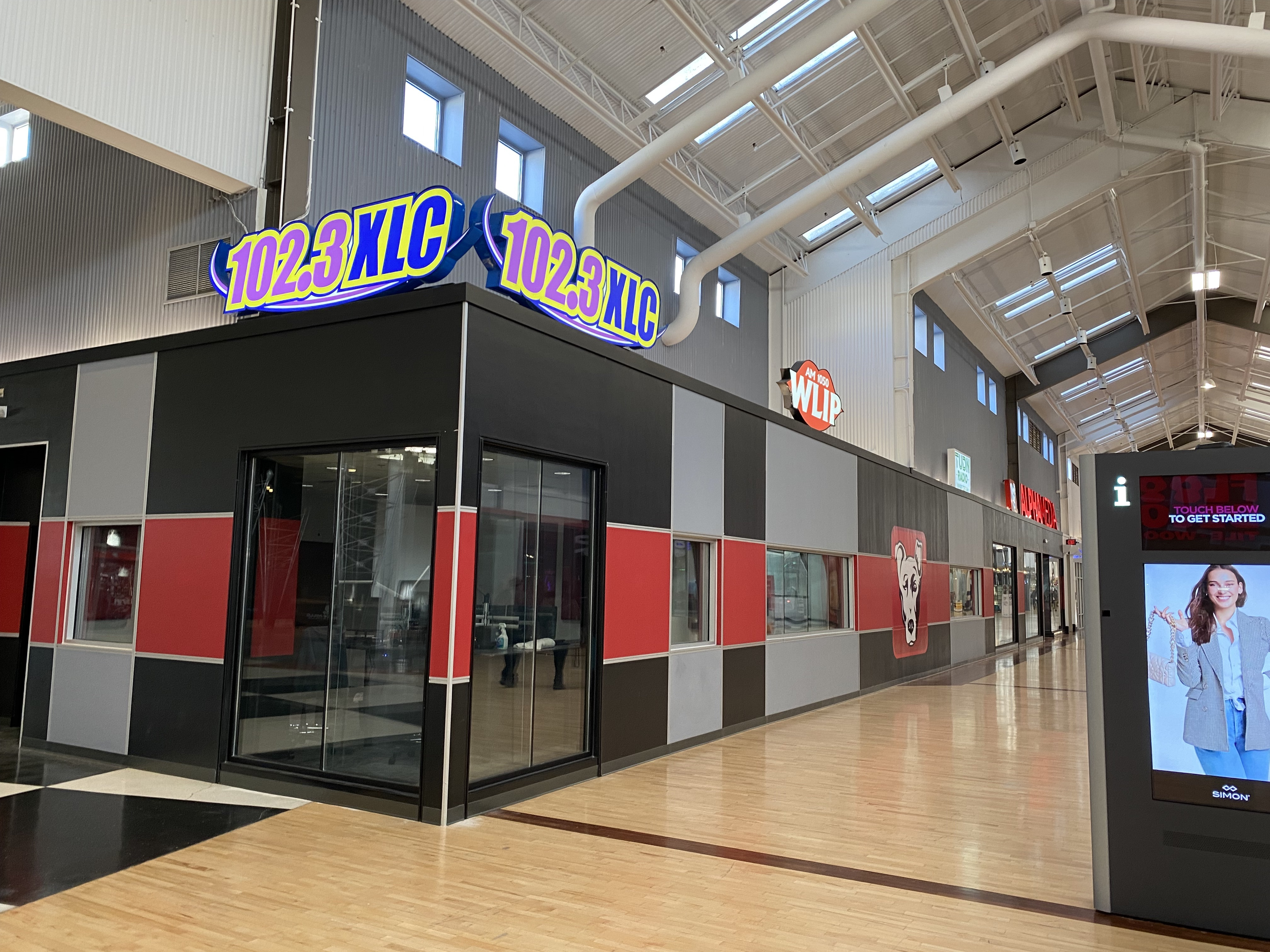
- WXLC's studios at the Gurnee Mills mall in Gurnee, Illinois
- Waukegan, Illinois; United States
- Broadcast area: Lake County; Northeastern Illinois
- Frequency: 102.3 MHz
- Branding: Free Country 98.3 & 102.3

Programming
- Format: Country

Ownership
- Owner: Connoisseur Media; (Alpha Media Licensee LLC)
- Sister stations: WCCQ; WERV-FM; WIIL; WJOL; WKRS; WSSR; WZSR

History
- First air date: May 1963 (as WEFA)
- Former call signs: WEFA (1963–1980)
- Call sign meaning: Across Lake County

Technical information
- Licensing authority: FCC
- Facility ID: 10451
- Class: A
- ERP: 3,000 watts
- HAAT: 98 meters (322 ft)

Links
- Public license information: Public file; LMS
- Webcast: Listen live
- Website: www.freecountrychicago.com

WXLC (102.3 FM) is a radio station based in Waukegan, Illinois. The format is country music and the station is owned by Connoisseur Media. WXLC broadcasts throughout Lake County, Illinois and Kenosha County, Wisconsin. WXLC also penetrates the Illinois counties of Cook and McHenry in addition to Racine County in Wisconsin as well. The station's transmitter is in Waukegan, while its studios are based in the north end of the Gurnee Mills mall in Gurnee.

== History ==
The station began broadcasting in May 1963 and held the call sign WEFA. In 1980, the station's call sign was changed to WXLC, which stands for "Across Lake County". The X illustrates "across." Its tower is clearly visible on Route 120, east of US 41. WXLC was also used on US Cable Channel Guide, Lake County's only original Electronic Prevue Guide.

WXLC was an affiliate of Dan Ingram's Top 40 Satellite Survey in the mid 1980s, an affiliate of The Rockin' America Top 30 Countdown with Scott Shannon in the late 1980s and early 1990s, and an affiliate of American Top 40 with Shadoe Stevens in the early 1990s.

WXLC was a Top 40 CHR mostly in the 1980’s to early 2020’s, except during September 1993 to May 1994 when it was a Modern Rock/Alternative format.

Many Chicago area radio personalities and other DJs nationwide can trace their careers back to WXLC at one time or another. Nick Farella (1948–2005) was a Chicago broadcaster (WMAQ) as well as a longtime Program Director at the station.

For many years, WXLC was known as "Hot 102.3 FM". On March 20, 2023, WXLC rebranded as "Star 102.3", matching the branding used by Alpha Media's two other hot AC stations in suburban Chicago (WSSR and WZSR). On May 24, 2024, WXLC flipped to a simulcast of country-formatted sister station WCCQ in Joliet. Alpha Media merged with Connoisseur Media on September 4, 2025.
