= WRXQ =

Radio station in Coal City, Illinois

- Coal City, Illinois; United States
- Broadcast area: Chicago Southland and Joliet, Illinois
- Frequency: 100.7 MHz
- Branding: Q Rock 100.7

Programming
- Format: Active rock
- Affiliations: United Stations Radio Networks

Ownership
- Owner: Steven Seline; (Walnut Radio Illinois, LLC)
- Operator: Connoisseur Media

History
- First air date: February 8, 1990; 36 years ago
- Former call signs: WKBM (1990–1998); WBVS (1998–2003)
- Call sign meaning: "Rocks"; "Q" brand

Technical information
- Licensing authority: FCC
- Facility ID: 3959
- Class: A
- ERP: 2,450 watts
- HAAT: 147 meters (482 ft)
- Transmitter coordinates: 41°17′42.1″N 88°10′15.2″W

Links
- Public license information: Public file; LMS
- Webcast: Listen live
- Website: www.qrockonline.com

WRXQ (100.7 FM) is a commercial radio station broadcasting an active rock format. Licensed to Coal City, Illinois, it serves the Southland suburbs of the Chicago metropolitan area including Joliet. The station is owned by Steven Seline, through licensee Walnut Radio Illinois, LLC, and operated by Connoisseur Media. Its studios are on Caton Farm Road in Crest Hill, Illinois.

WRXQ has an effective radiated power (ERP) of 2,450 watts. The transmitter is on Illinois Route 53 in Wilmington Township, Illinois.

== History ==
=== WKBM ===
The station signed on the air on February 8, 1990. The original call sign was WKBM. It aired an oldies format.

WKBM carried programming from the Satellite Music Network and also featured local personalities. It was originally owned by Barden Broadcasting, and had an ERP of 1,400 watts at an HAAT of 482 feet. In 1998, the station was sold to Pride Communications.

=== WBVS ===
In April 1998, the station's call sign was changed to WBVS. The format was changed from oldies to Top 40 - CHR. WBVS was branded as "100.7 The Bus", with the slogan "Today's Hottest Hits". "The Bus" branding had previously been used in the area by 99.9 WBUS in Kankakee, Illinois from 1985 to 1996, while that station aired a CHR format.

In 2000, its ERP was increased to 2,450 watts. That year, the station was sold to NextMedia Group.

=== WRXQ ===
In January 2003, the station's call sign was changed to WRXQ. It began airing a classic rock format. It used the moniker "100.7 RXQ", with the slogan "The Southland's Classic Rock". In 2012 the station's branding was changed to Q Rock, and it began to transition to a mainstream rock format. It has since transitioned to an active rock format.

In 2013, NextMedia's stations were sold to Digity LCC, and in 2016, Digity LCC's stations were sold to Alpha Media. Effective April 8, 2019, Walnut Radio Illinois purchased WRXQ from Alpha Media for $300,000; Alpha Media continued to provide services to WRXQ under a shared services agreement. Alpha Media merged with Connoisseur Media on September 4, 2025.
