= WCGO =

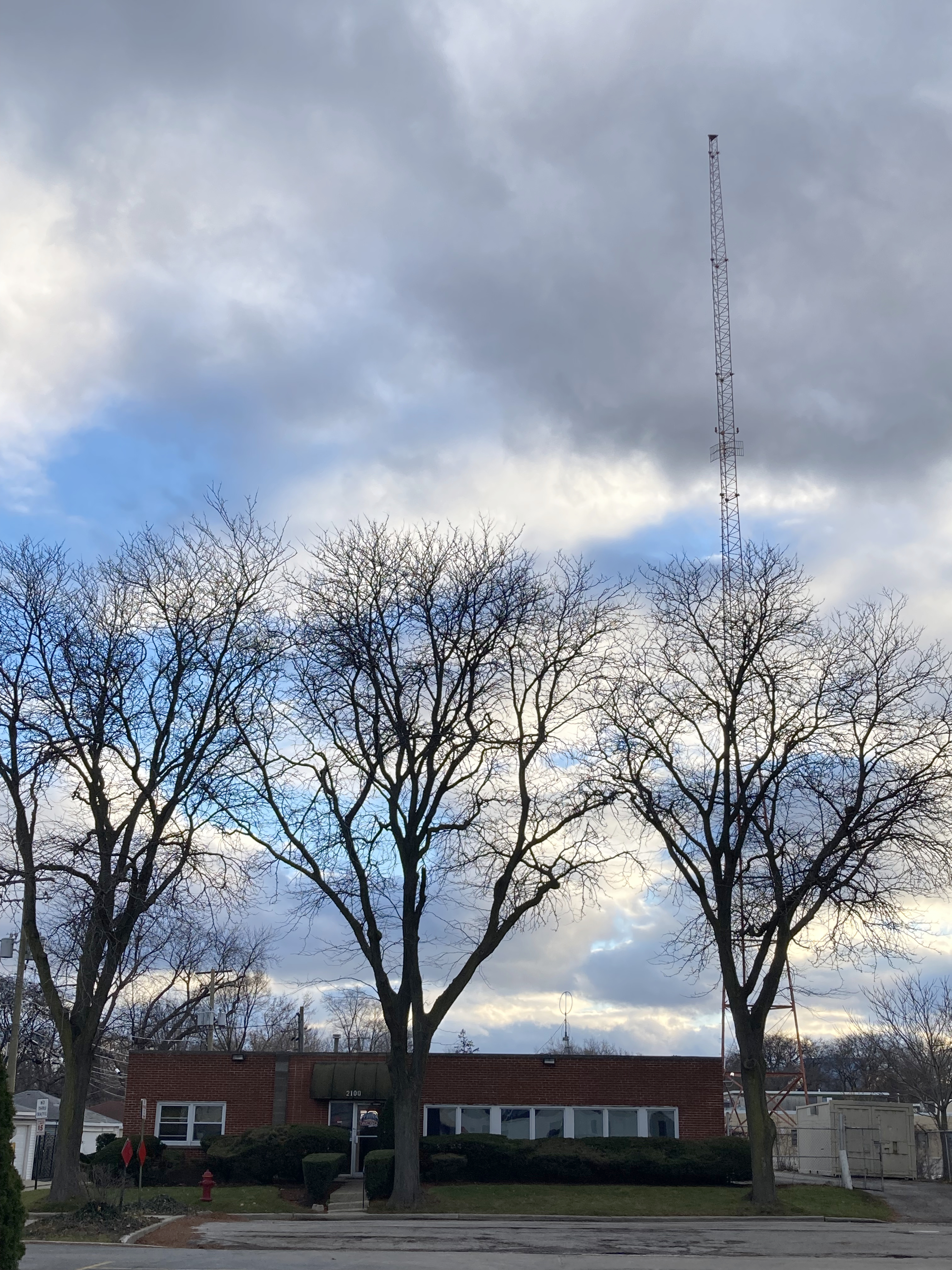
- Evanston, Illinois; United States
- Broadcast area: Chicago metropolitan area
- Frequency: 1590 kHz
- Branding: Chicago's Smart Talk

Programming
- Format: Brokered programming (English, Korean, Russian, Assyrian)
- Affiliations: Genesis Communications Network; Premiere Networks; USA Radio Network

Ownership
- Owner: Jorge Rodriquez; (Ambiente Clasico LLC)

History
- First air date: September 29, 1947; 78 years ago
- Former call signs: WNMP (1947–1970); WLTD (1970–1979); WONX (1979–2009)
- Call sign meaning: Chicago

Technical information
- Licensing authority: FCC
- Facility ID: 35447
- Class: D
- Power: 8,700 watts day; 24 watts night
- Transmitter coordinates: 42°2′7.1″N 87°42′12.2″W
- Translator: 95.9 W240EH (Evanston)

Links
- Public license information: Public file; LMS
- Webcast: Listen live
- Website: wcgoradio.com

WCGO (1590 AM) is a commercial radio station licensed to Evanston, Illinois, and serving the Chicago metropolitan area's northern suburbs. The station is owned by Jorge Rodriquez through licensee Ambiente Clasico LLC. WCGO has a brokered programming radio format where hosts buy time on the station and may use their shows to advertise their services or seek donations. On weekday mornings, the station airs Korean-language Christian radio programming. Russian language shows are heard in the afternoon. Evenings and weekends, WCGO airs brokered talk and ethnic shows. Overnight, it carries the nationally syndicated Coast to Coast AM with George Noory from Premiere Networks.

By day, WCGO is powered at 10,000 watts non-directional. To protect other stations on 1590 AM from interference, at night it reduces power to 2,500 watts and uses a directional antenna with a four-tower array The transmitter was previously on North McCormick Boulevard near West Howard Street in Skokie. Now the transmitter site is Evanston. The previous 4 tower array in Skokie has been replaced by a single tower in Evanston (further South near Lee Street).

Programming is also heard on 250-watt FM translator W240EH at 95.9 MHz in Evanston.

== History ==
=== WNMP ===
The station began broadcasting on September 29, 1947, and held the call sign WNMP. WNMP operated during daytime hours only, with a power of 1,000 watts. Block programming was aired in its early years. In 1959, the station adopted a classical music/light music format. In 1960, the station was sold to Harry H. Semrow and his brother Otto Semrow for $325,000. The station aired an easy listening format in the 1960s and carried Northwestern Wildcats football. In December 1969, the station was sold to Alan H. Cummings and Buddy Black for $875,000.

=== WLTD ===
The station's call sign was changed to WLTD on November 2, 1970. WLTD aired easy listening music, old-time radio shows, and specialty talk shows. On May 2, 1970, Chuck Schaden's first Those Were The Days program aired on WNMP. It continued on WLTD until 1975, when the station changed format.

In 1975, the station was sold to Kovas Communications for $400,000, and adopted a beautiful music format.

=== WONX ===
On April 9, 1979, the station's call sign was changed to WONX. The station switched to a Spanish language format. Programming in other languages were also aired over the years. In 1982, the station added nighttime operations, running 2,500 watts. It used a four-tower directional array at night. In 1997, the station's daytime power was increased to 3,500 watts.

=== WCGO ===
On April 10, 2009, the previous WCGO on 1600, also owned by Kovas, was taken off the air. On April 13, 2009, WONX's call sign was changed to WCGO. With 1600 now vacant, the new WCGO was able to increase its daytime power to 7,000 watts. In 2014, the station's daytime power was increased to 10,000 watts.

WCGO began airing talk programs in September 2014, with local shows hosted by Franklin Raff and Geoff Pinkus, as well as Dana Loesch's syndicated program. On April 6, 2015, Milt Rosenberg began hosting a program on the station. As of 2023, its programming is multilingual: Weekend programming includes Legal Eagles with William Pelarenos, The Dave Ramsey Show, The Assyrian Cultural Foundation: The Guiding Voice with Ninos Nirari, The Chicago Wine Report with Chip Dudley, Tom Hall, and Lainie Petersen, Domingo Felices with Frank Camacho, and Dialogo Politico with Robert Ameneiro. Weekdays features Korean Christian programming weekday mornings, Russian language programing via Radio NVC weekday afternoons, and Multiformat Network show highlights in the evenings. Overnight programming is Coast to Coast AM with George Noory.

In 2017, the station was sold to William Pollack for $3 million. In 2019, WCGO became the flagship station of the national SmartTalk Radio Network.

Pollack sold WCGO to Jorge Rodriguez's Ambiente Clasico LLC for $675,000 in 2023; Ambiente Clasico had been leasing the station's overnight programming. WCGO's real estate was separately sold to Rodriguez in a $150,000 deal.

== Translator ==
| Call sign | Frequency | City of license | FID | ERP (W) | Class | Transmitter coordinates | FCC info |
|---|---|---|---|---|---|---|---|
| W240EH | 95.9 FM | Evanston, Illinois | 202249 | 250 | D | 42°1′19.1″N 87°42′40.2″W | LMS |
