= WXQR-FM =

- Jacksonville, North Carolina; United States
- Frequency: 105.5 MHz
- Branding: Rock 105.5: Carolina's Pure Rock

Programming
- Language: English
- Format: Active rock

Ownership
- Owner: Dick Broadcasting; (Dick Broadcasting Company, Inc. of Tennessee)

History
- First air date: March 14, 1966

Technical information
- Licensing authority: FCC
- Facility ID: 28172
- Class: C2
- ERP: 19,000 watts
- HAAT: 242 meters (794 ft)
- Transmitter coordinates: 34°31′10.00″N 77°26′52.00″W

Links
- Public license information: Public file; LMS
- Webcast: Listen live
- Website: myrock105.com

WXQR-FM (105.5 MHz) is a radio station broadcasting an active rock format. Originally based in Jacksonville, North Carolina, the station is headquartered in New Bern.

== History ==
WXQR-FM is one of the oldest rock stations in America. It was known as "The Rock and Roll Animal" from the 1970s until the mid-1990s. The station was once owned by Sidney Popkin, a member of one of the most prominent families in Jacksonville. During the 1980s and 1990s, the station was headquartered on New Bridge Street near downtown Jacksonville, in what was once the Iwo Jima Theater. Because of its location, it was a favorite for decades among Marines stationed at Camp Lejeune. The station operated with 3,000 watts of power, which put them at a competitive disadvantage against its Newport-based rival Z-103, but WXQR had a solid following of loyal listeners. When Z-103 finally switched to Adult Contemporary (WMGV), New Bern's WSFL-FM became WXQR's main competition; however, WXQR-FM wasn't competitive with WSFL until its power was increased in the mid-1990s. HVS Partners, WXQR-FM's longtime owners, sold the station in the mid-1990s to Cumulus, who then sold it to NextMedia Group a few years later. From October 2010 to January 2012, it simulcast to inland areas on WQZL/101.1.

NextMedia sold WXQR-FM and their 32 other radio stations to Digity, LLC for $85 million; the transaction was consummated on February 10, 2014.

Effective February 25, 2016, Digity, LLC and its 124 radio stations were acquired by Alpha Media for $264 million.

In September 2017, Dick Broadcasting announced the purchase of Alpha Media stations in three markets — 18 stations and two translators in total, at a purchase price of $19.5 million. The acquisition of WXQR-FM by Dick Broadcasting was consummated on December 20, 2017.

On August 2, 2021, WXQR-FM changed their format from active rock to Regional Mexican, branded as "La Pantera 105.5". “Rock 105" had broadcast for more than 40 years and was the "original rock station" for the Carolina Coast. The previous Rock format continued as a live stream until Tuesday night January 31, 2023 at the stroke of midnight when it signed off for a final time with The Doors “The End”.

On October 4, 2024, WXQR-FM changed their format from Regional Mexican to Spanish rhythmic, branded as "Candela 105.5".

On March 17, 2026, the Facebook page for the "Carolina's Pure Rock" stream hinted that the Rock format would be revived on Easter weekend. The announcement dovetailed with continued underperformance of the Spanish Rhythmic format in the Eastlan ratings, only drawing a 0.5 share in January 2026. At midnight on April 4, 2026, WXQR-FM changed their format back to active rock, reviving the "ROCK 105.5" branding.
