= Mass media in Key West, Florida =

== Television ==
The television stations received in Key West, Florida are the stations in the Miami-Fort Lauderdale Market, with rebroadcast transmitters in Key West and Marathon, Florida.

Call Letters	Network Affiliation	Broadcast Location	Analog Channel	Digital Channel
WPBT	PBS	Key West, Florida	2	2
WSBS-TV	IND	Key West, Florida	None	3
WFIB-LD	TBD	Key West, Florida	6	6
W05CL	TBD	Key West, Florida	5	None
WGEN-TV	IND	Key West, Florida	8	12
WFSF-LD	TBD	Key West, Florida	10	10
W16CI	TBD	Key West, Florida	16	None
WEYW-LP	RTN	Key West, Florida	19	None
WSBS-TV	IND	Key West, Florida	22	None
WGZT-LD	TBD	Key West, Florida	27	None
WCAY-CD (Class A)	Tourist Network ("Key TV")	Key West, Florida	36	None
WMDF-LD	IND ("Proud TV")	Key West, Florida	41	4
WPLG	Independent	Key West, Florida	47	10.1
WKIZ-LD		Key West, Florida	49	29
W52BG	TBD	Big Pine Key, Florida	52	None

== Radio ==
=== AM ===
- Radio Martí 1180 - United States' federally run station broadcasting propaganda in the Spanish language to its target audience in Cuba. Tower is located in Marathon, Florida, and can be heard throughout the Keys.
- WFFG 1300 - A full time 2500 watt station. This station is located in Marathon and reaches Key West with a strong signal. It was a top 40 station in the 1970s Country in the 1980s. It currently has a talk format.
- WKWF 1600 - A full time 500 watt station. In 1945 this station signed on the air. It featured a variety of programming including variety in the 1950 and 1960s. Country and rock in the 1970s. Big Band and show tunes in the 1980s, and now the current format sports.

=== FM ===
- WYBX 88.3 FM - The station broadcasts a Christian format, and is owned by the Bible Broadcasting Network, Inc.
- WYBW 88.3 FM - The station broadcasts a Christian format to Key Colony Beach, and is owned by the Bible Broadcasting Network, Inc.
- WKWM 91.5 FM - National Public Radio station serving the Keys. Airs a full roster of public radio news, talk, and music programs. WKWM is a full time simulcast of WLRN-FM, and broadcasts from its tower in Marathon.
- WEOW 92.7 FM - The first FM station in Key West. Originally on 92.5 FM, WFYN-FM began with a beautiful music format till 1982. It became an adult contemporary format as "WOW 92.5". The station switched to Top 40/CHR in 1990.
- WKEY 93.7 FM - Originally a 3,000 watt station. Was the original frequency for WWUS-FM. Boosted power to 33,000 watts in the 1990s. Has had the original light AC format since sign-on. Call letters changed from WKRY.
- WAVK 97.7 FM - This station went on the air as WDUC in 1995. Later that November 3, the station changed its call sign to WKTS, on 1999-09-09 to WWWK, and on 2003-10-23 to the current WAVK. The first real format of WWWK was pure dance music as "K97", before flipping to hot AC "Wave".
- WCNK 98.7 FM - Originally a rock station WOZN. Sold to the owners of WWUS FM and changed to jazz. The station now has a country format.
- WAIL 99.5 FM - This station was originally on 95.5 FM WVFK with an eclectic format. That transmitter site burned in the 1980s and was returned to the original owner. The station signed on with a country format. It was sold in the 1980s and was changed to an electric rock format. The tower was destroyed in a hurricane, and once again was returned to the original owners which switched the station to a top 40 format in 1986. Throughout the rest of the late 1980s, it was a rock-leaned Top 40 format. The station dropped its rock-leaned Top 40 format for an AOR and an adult rock format. The station is an affiliate of Rick Dees Weekly Top 40 according to Radio & Records during its Top 40 years. The station was sold once again and went bankrupt and was repossessed by the original owners once again. In the 1990s, the station was sold to Clear Channel, and is classic rock.
- WPIK 102.5 FM - This station signed on in 1991 with a hot country format. In 2003 it was changed to a Hot AC format through a local marketing agreement. In 2005 the station was sold again. The current format is Spanish.
- WWUS 104.1 FM - Originally at 104.7 US1 radio has always been a classic hits station. It was first as a Top 40/adult rock format before becoming an adult contemporary format in 1986. WWUS is an affiliate of Dan Ingram's Top 40 Satellite Survey. A format change in the 1990s lasted about two weeks, listeners protested, and the format was changed back.
- WXKW 104.9 FM - Station branded as Barefoot Radio. This station plays Trop-Rock, Alternative Rock, Classic Rock, and local musicians.
- WIIS 106.9 FM - This station signed on the air in August 1977 on 107.1 FM. In 1982, the station moved its dial to 106.9 FM and switched its format to an Adult Contemporary format in 1983. It was the first station to become Top 40/CHR in the Key West area. The station switched to CHR in 1985. It made such an impact that within a few months, 92.7 WFYN changed the format from B-EZ to Adult Contemporary.

== See also ==
- List of newspapers in Florida
- Media in Miami
