= Family Group Broadcasting =

Television and radio broadcaster in the United States

Family Group Broadcasting, L.P.
- Industry: Broadcast television
- Fate: Defunct
- Headquarters: Tampa, Florida, United States
- Area served: Midwest, Southeast and South Central United States and the U.S. Virgin Islands
- Key people: Ian N. Wheeler (President/General Partner)

Family Group Broadcasting, L.P. was a Delaware-incorporated, Florida-based television and radio broadcasting company. A small company, based in and around Tampa Bay, the company operated from the early 1980s to about 1997. Throughout its history, it owned and/or operated several different radio and television stations – all of its television stations independents (initially), on the UHF dial east of the Mississippi River. Also, the company operated under other names and aliases such as Family Broadcasting Company, Inc., Family Group Entertainment and Family Group Ltd. III.

Many of the stations shared the same type of branding with their channel number in chrome inside a red diamond and the station's call letters in white text inside a blue parallelogram underneath, along with a common imaging theme with the name of the group in the lyrics, 'TV that's fun! We bring you...Family fun!'.

== Former stations ==
=== Television stations ===
- ^{1} Stations built and/or signed-on by Family Group Broadcasting.
- ^{2} Family Group Broadcasting had a 50 percent stake in the station. Also, Heritage Media, then-owners of ABC affiliate WEAR-TV, took control of the station under a Local marketing agreement beginning in 1995 and lasting until 1997, when both stations and the rest of Heritage Media's television stations division were acquired by and absorbed into Sinclair Broadcast Group.
- ^{3} WLKT-TV was partially owned by Family Group Broadcasting in a "50–50" joint venture with a non-profit company, Way of the Cross, Inc. and was founded in 1983. However, the station didn't sign-on until 1988. Due to low viewership from a contract requiring Way of the Cross's religious programming to air in prime time slots, questionable reception and not being able to find a buyer, the two companies took the station off the air less than a year later and subsequently returned the license to the Federal Communications Commission. In 1999, a new low-power station took to the air on channel 62, WBLU-LP, but itself was troubled and taken off the air after being sold to Daystar in 2009.

Market	Station PSIP (RF)	Years owned	Sold to	Current status
Mobile, AL – Pensacola – Fort Walton Beach, FL	WFGX 35 (50)	1987–1997^{1 2}	Sinclair Broadcast Group	Still owned by Sinclair as a MyNetworkTV affiliate
Fort Myers – Naples – Cape Coral, FL	WFTX-TV 36 (35)	1985–1986	Wabash Valley Broadcasting	Fox affiliate owned by The E.W. Scripps Company
Panama City, FL	WPGX 28 (9)	1988–1990	Ashling Broadcasting Group	Fox affiliate owned by Lockwood Broadcast Group
Tampa – St. Petersburg, FL	WFTS-TV 28 (17)	1981–1984^{1}	Capital Cities Communications	ABC affiliate owned by The E.W. Scripps Company
Rockford, IL	WQRF-TV 39 (36)	1986–1989	Petracom Broadcasting	Fox affiliate owned by Nexstar Media Group
Lexington – Fayette, KY	WLKT-TV 62	1983–1989^{3}	Taken off the air	Defunct in 1989, license cancelled and returned to the FCC
Roanoke – Lynchburg, VA	WVFT 27 (36)	1986–1991	Roanoke–Lynchburg TV Acquisition Corporation	Fox affiliate, WFXR, owned by Nexstar Media Group
Green Bay – Appleton, WI	WGBA-TV 26 (14)	1985–1991	Aries Telecommunications	NBC affiliate owned by The E.W. Scripps Company
La Crosse – Eau Claire, WI	WLAX 25 (17)	1986–1991^{1}	Aries Telecommunications	Fox affiliate owned by Nexstar Media Group

=== Radio stations ===
- ^{1} The station today, operates as a simulcast of now-sister station, WANG 1490 AM, which in turn also operates a translator, W278CE on 103.5 FM.
- ^{2} As of May 2020, the station is temporarily off the air as repairs are ongoing to its transmitter. As a result, its sports radio format is currently on WAVK 97.7 FM in the meantime.
- ^{3} The station today, operates as a simulcast of now-sister station, WFKZ 103.1 FM.

==== AM stations ====
Market	Station	Frequency	Current Status
Key West, FL	WKWF	1600^{2}	CBS Sports Radio and SB Nation Radio dual affiliate owned by Spottswood Partners II, LTD
Tampa – St. Petersburg, FL	WQBN	1300	Spanish Variety owned by Crisbeto Enterprises Corp.
Biloxi – Gulfport – Pascagoula, MS	WVMI	570	Classic country as WTNI^{1} on 1640 owned by Telesouth Communications
Beaumont – Port Arthur, TX	KAYC	1450	CBS Sports Radio affiliate KIKR owned by Cumulus Media

==== FM stations ====
Market	Station	Frequency	Current Status
Key West, FL	WAIL	99.5	Classic rock owned by Florida Keys Media, LLC^{3}
Biloxi – Gulfport – Pascagoula, MS	WQID	93.7	Adult Contemporary as WMJY owned by iHeartMedia
Beaumont – Port Arthur, TX	KAYD/KAYD-FM	97.5	ESPN Radio affiliate KFNC owned by GOW Media, LLC
Charlotte Amalie, USVI	WVGN	105.3	Mainstream Urban, Reggae and Calypso as WVJZ owned by Ackley Media Group
