= WUPX-TV =

Television station in Richmond, Kentucky

- Richmond–Lexington, Kentucky; United States
- City: Richmond, Kentucky (Note: Originally licensed to Morehead, Kentucky; moved to Richmond in 2018.)
- Channels: Digital: 25 (UHF); Virtual: 67

Programming
- Affiliations: 67.1: Ion Television; for others, see § Subchannels

Ownership
- Owner: Inyo Broadcast Holdings (sale to the E. W. Scripps Company pending); (Inyo Broadcast Licenses LLC)

History
- Founded: October 14, 1985
- First air date: June 1, 1998
- Former call signs: WAOM (1998–2001)
- Former channel numbers: Analog: 67 (UHF, 1998–2009); Digital: 21 (UHF, 2002–2019)
- Former affiliations: UPN (1998–2001); The WB (secondary, 1999–2001)
- Call sign meaning: Kentucky's Pax

Technical information
- Licensing authority: FCC
- Facility ID: 23128
- ERP: 465 kW
- HAAT: 354.11 m (1,162 ft)
- Transmitter coordinates: 37°47′18″N 84°40′49″W

Links
- Public license information: Public file; LMS
- Website: iontelevision.com

WUPX-TV (channel 67) is a television station licensed to Richmond, Kentucky, United States, serving the Lexington area as an affiliate of Ion Television. The station is owned by Inyo Broadcast Holdings, and maintains a transmitter on High Bridge Road north of Bryantsville, Kentucky.

== History ==
A construction permit for WAOM was issued on October 14, 1985. Originally licensed to Morehead, Kentucky, the station signed on the air on June 1, 1998, with low-power UPN affiliate WBLU-LP (channel 62) signing on five months later. Both stations simulcast programming from UPN and The WB as well as infomercials until WAOM was sold off in 2001. After WAOM was sold, WBLU-LP lost both The WB and UPN in 2003 and 2004, respectively, to become independent, and at some point became affiliated with MyNetworkTV and RTV. WBLU-LP is no longer broadcasting as it went dark in 2009 after its parent company went bankrupt.

In 2001, WAOM-TV was sold to Paxson Communications (now Ion Media), became a Pax TV owned-and-operated station and changed its callsign to the current WUPX-TV. Pax TV became i: Independent Television in 2005, and then Ion Television in 2007.

On December 11, 2018, the FCC granted WUPX-TV's petition to change its city of license from Morehead to Richmond, Kentucky. The move was conditioned upon the station providing continued service to Morehead.

=== Near sale to Scripps; sale to Inyo Broadcast Holdings; pending sale back to Scripps ===
On September 24, 2020, the Cincinnati-based E. W. Scripps Company announced that it would purchase Ion Media for $2.65 billion, with financing from Berkshire Hathaway. With this purchase, Scripps would divest 23 Ion-owned stations, but no announcement was made as to which stations that Scripps would divest as part of the move. However, on October 16, 2020, it was announced that WUPX-TV would be one of the stations that Scripps would spin off as part of the merger. The buyer, revealed in an October 2020 FCC filing to be Inyo Broadcast Holdings, has promised to maintain the stations' Ion Television affiliations after the purchase. The proposed divestitures will allow the merged company to fully comply with the FCC local and national ownership regulations. This would have made it a sister station to NBC affiliate WLEX-TV (channel 18) if Scripps had decided to keep WUPX-TV, but Lexington has fewer than eight independently owned and operating full-power television stations, not enough to permit a duopoly in any case. The transaction was finalized and closed on January 7, 2021.

Scripps announced its repurchase of all Inyo stations on February 26, 2026.

== Technical information ==
=== Subchannels ===
The station's signal is multiplexed:

Subchannels of WUPX-TV
Subchannel	Res.	Short name	Programming
67.1	720p	ION	Ion Television
67.2	480i	Mystery	Ion Mystery
67.3	480i	BUSTED	Busted
67.4	480i	Laff	Laff
67.5	480i	IONPlus	Ion Plus
67.6	480i	GameSho	Game Show Central
67.7	480i	QVC2	QVC2
67.8	480i	HSN	HSN
67.9	480i	QVC	QVC

=== Analog-to-digital conversion ===
WUPX-TV shut down its analog signal, over UHF channel 67, on June 12, 2009, the official date on which full-power television stations in the United States transitioned from analog to digital broadcasts under federal mandate. The station's digital signal remained on its pre-transition UHF channel 21, using virtual channel 67.

=== TV spectrum repack ===
WUPX moved its channel allocation from digital channel 21 to channel 25 in 2019, but it remained on virtual channel 67. The station relocated its transmitter to a tower southwest of Lexington formerly used by Fox affiliate WDKY-TV (channel 56).
