= WQRF-TV =

Television station in Rockford, Illinois

- Rockford, Illinois; United States
- Channels: Digital: 36 (UHF); Virtual: 39
- Branding: Fox 39; Eyewitness News; Bounce Rockford (39.2)

Programming
- Affiliations: 39.1: Fox; for others, see § Subchannels

Ownership
- Owner: Nexstar Media Group; (Nexstar Media Inc.)
- Sister stations: WTVO

History
- First air date: November 27, 1978
- Former channel numbers: Analog: 39 (UHF, 1978–2009); Digital: 42 (UHF, 2005–2020)
- Former affiliations: Independent (1978–1989)
- Call sign meaning: Quality Rockford

Technical information
- Licensing authority: FCC
- Facility ID: 52408
- ERP: 910 kW
- HAAT: 148.1 m (486 ft)
- Transmitter coordinates: 42°17′14″N 89°10′15″W

Links
- Public license information: Public file; LMS
- Website: www.mystateline.com

WQRF-TV (channel 39) is a television station in Rockford, Illinois, United States, affiliated with the Fox network. It is owned by Nexstar Media Group and operated alongside ABC affiliate WTVO (channel 17). The two stations share studios on North Meridian Road in Rockford, where WQRF-TV's transmitter is also located.

== History ==
The station signed on November 27, 1978, as the market's fourth television outlet, first broadcasting from studios located on Kishwaukee Street between State and 1st streets in downtown Rockford, under the ownership of Marvin Palmquist, a local entrepreneur who founded several different businesses, including a hearing aid company which served as WQRF's original licensee. It was the last full-power analog television station to sign on in Rockford, while other stations in the area since then have either been low-power, cable-only, or on digital subchannels, and re-used the former channel 39 allocation of WTVO utilized from its sign-on until its move to channel 17 in 1967. It was promoted as an independent, "family-oriented" alternative to the area's big three network affiliates, along with serving as a local alternative to Chicago's WGN-TV and WFLD, both of which were widely available on area cable at the time. Palmquist sold the station to Orion Broadcasting in 1984.

Overcoming a four-month wait to finally get on-the-air, WQRF's first program was an episode of the classic sitcom Gomer Pyle, U.S.M.C.. Among some of the earlier programs to also air on the station were I Love Lucy, The Bob Newhart Show, The Jeffersons, The Dick Van Dyke Show and first-run fare such as Entertainment Tonight, the original nighttime edition of Family Feud, The PTL Club and The 700 Club.

As it was the only independent station in the market, WQRF stocked up much of its programming schedule with live sports including Major League Baseball (Chicago White Sox, St. Louis Cardinals and Milwaukee Brewers), the NBA (Chicago Bulls and Milwaukee Bucks), NFL preseason action (Chicago Bears) and college sports (specifically Big Ten Conference football and basketball). Orion Broadcasting sold WQRF to Family Group Broadcasting in May 1986, sharing ownership and graphical imaging with WGBA-TV in Green Bay, Wisconsin, WVFT-TV in Roanoke, Virginia, WPGX in Panama City, Florida, WFGX in Fort Walton Beach, Florida, WLAX in La Crosse, Wisconsin, and WLKT in Lexington, Kentucky. The station later relocated its operations to a new building located on South Main Street/IL 2 in Rockford.

The station joined Fox in August 1989. For the network's first three years of existence, cable subscribers watched Fox through O&O WFLD, along with Madison's WMSN-TV and Milwaukee's WCGV-TV, on the market's edges. Within four years of joining Fox, WQRF ranked as one of the network's highest-rated stations. On September 12 of that year, Family Group sold the station to Petracom Broadcasting. Petracom in turn sold it to Quorum Broadcasting in 1998.

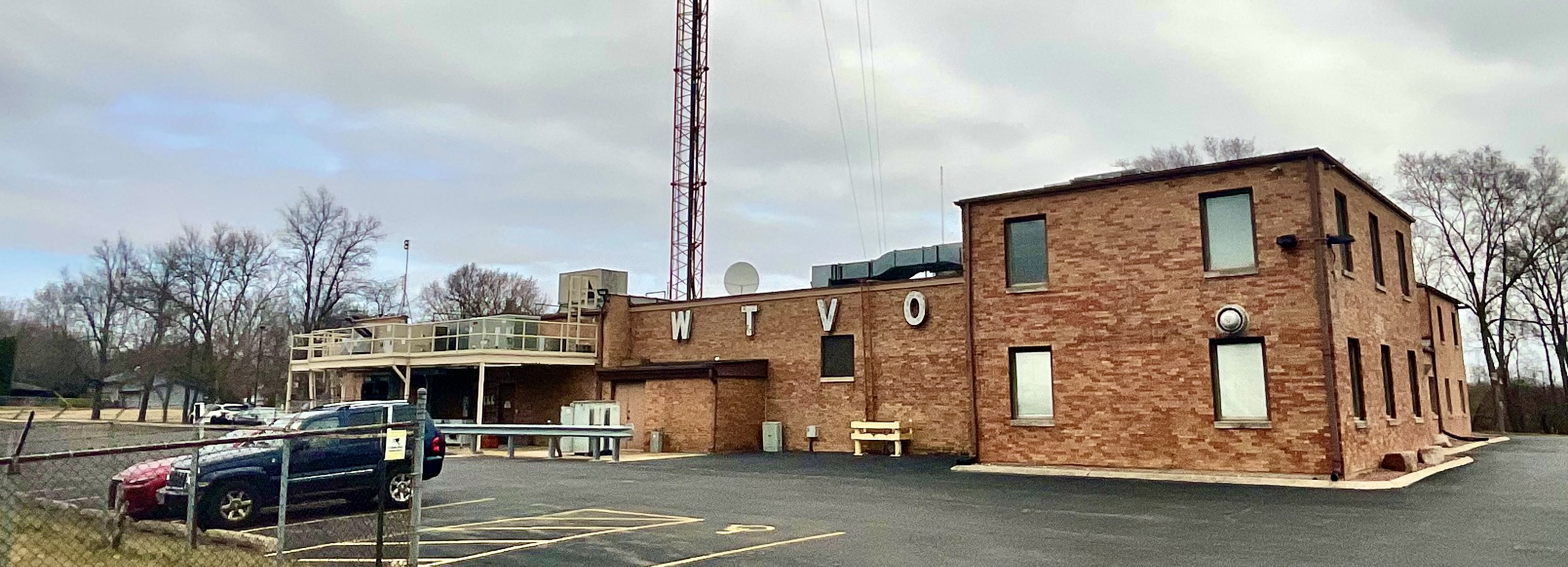
WQRF-TV has been based out of the facility of WTVO on North Meridian Road west of Rockford since 2005.

With the expansion of Fox's prime time programming and the move of Big Ten Conference sports rights to Fox, WQRF has become more competitive over the years. The station joined Nexstar as part of the company's acquisition of Quorum Broadcasting in late 2003. On November 22, 2004, Mission Broadcasting bought WTVO from Young Broadcasting for $21 million, entered into a shared services agreement with WQRF, with WQRF moving into WTVO's studio, though WQRF is technically the senior partner.

== News operation ==
In March 2006, WTVO began producing the market's second prime time newscast on WQRF known as Fox 39 News at 9. The broadcast only aired on weeknights unlike the area's original prime time show that was seen every night on cable-only WB affiliate "WBR" (produced by WREX). This distinction made WQRF's news Rockford's first over-the-air newscast at 9 p.m. Competition between "WBR" and WQRF was short-lived because, in late 2007, the former had its news canceled by WREX for an unknown reason. The time slot was used to replay the NBC outlet's weeknight 6 p.m. newscast on what was then CW affiliate WREX-DT2.

Another addition to local newscasts on WQRF occurred January 14, 2008, when WTVO launched Fox 39 Evening News at 6:30. Eventually, WQRF expanded Fox 39 News at 9 to a seven-night operation and lengthened the weeknight version to a full hour. This station would eventually drop the 6:30 show for an unknown reason. WQRF's weeknight prime time newscast at 9 p.m. maintains a separate news anchor but features the same meteorologist and sports anchor as WTVO.

On March 5, 2012, WTVO launched a two-hour-long extension of its weekday morning show on WQRF. Known as Fox 39 News in the Morning, this can be seen from 7 to 9 a.m. offering a local alternative to the national morning programs that air on the area's big three outlets. WIFR was the first television station in Rockford to upgrade its newscasts to high definition followed by WREX on December 12, 2010. On December 18, 2012, WTVO and WQRF debuted a brand new set, news music package, and graphics scheme that is based on the Eyewitness News branding seen on other Nexstar/Mission television stations. On April 24, 2013, WQRF began broadcasting local news content in high definition.

== Technical information ==
=== Subchannels ===
The station's signal is multiplexed:

Subchannels of WQRF-TV
Subchannel	Res.	Short name	Programming
39.1	720p	WQRF-DT	Fox
39.2	480i	WQRF-D2	Bounce TV
39.3	480i	Mystery	Ion Mystery
39.4	480i	COZI	Cozi TV

=== Analog-to-digital conversion ===
WQRF-TV shut down its analog signal, over UHF channel 39, on February 17, 2009, the original target date on which full-power television stations in the United States were to transition from analog to digital broadcasts under federal mandate (which was later pushed back to June 12, 2009). The station's digital signal remained on its pre-transition UHF channel 42, using virtual channel 39.
