= Fox 56 =

Fox 56 may refer to one of two television stations in the United States affiliated with the Fox Broadcasting Company:

- WDKY-TV in Lexington, Kentucky, with website fox56news.com
- WOLF-TV in Scranton–Wilkes-Barre, Pennsylvania, with website fox56.com
