= WFKZ =

- Plantation Key, Florida; United States
- Broadcast area: Florida Keys area
- Frequency: 103.1 MHz
- Branding: Sun 103.1

Programming
- Format: Classic rock (Simulcast on 99.5 WAIL, Key West, Florida)
- Affiliations: AP Radio

Ownership
- Owner: Joseph Fiorini; (Fiorini Keys Media, LLC)
- Sister stations: WAIL, WCTH, WEOW, WKWF, WAVK, WCNK, WWUS

History
- First air date: 1984
- Call sign meaning: Florida Keys

Technical information
- Licensing authority: FCC
- Facility ID: 34356
- Class: C1
- ERP: 100,000 watts
- HAAT: 137 meters

Links
- Public license information: Public file; LMS
- Webcast: Listen live
- Website: sun103.com

WFKZ (103.1 FM) is a radio station broadcasting a classic rock format which is also simulcasted on 99.5 WAIL which is licensed to Key West, Florida. Licensed to Plantation Key, Florida, United States, the station serves the Florida Keys area. The station is currently owned by licensee Fiorini Keys Media, LLC, and features programming from AP Radio.

On January 25, 2008, it was announced that WFKZ was one of several Clear Channel radio stations to be sold, in order to remain under the ownership caps following the sale of Clear Channel to private investors. Until it was sold, WFKZ and other stations, to be sold, were placed into the Aloha Stations Trust.

The trust sold WFKZ and three sister stations to Robert Holladay's Florida Keys Media, LLC for $650,000; the transaction was consummated February 28, 2014.

In July 2024 the station was sold to Fiorini Keys Media, LLC
