= WGBA-TV =

Television station in Green Bay, Wisconsin

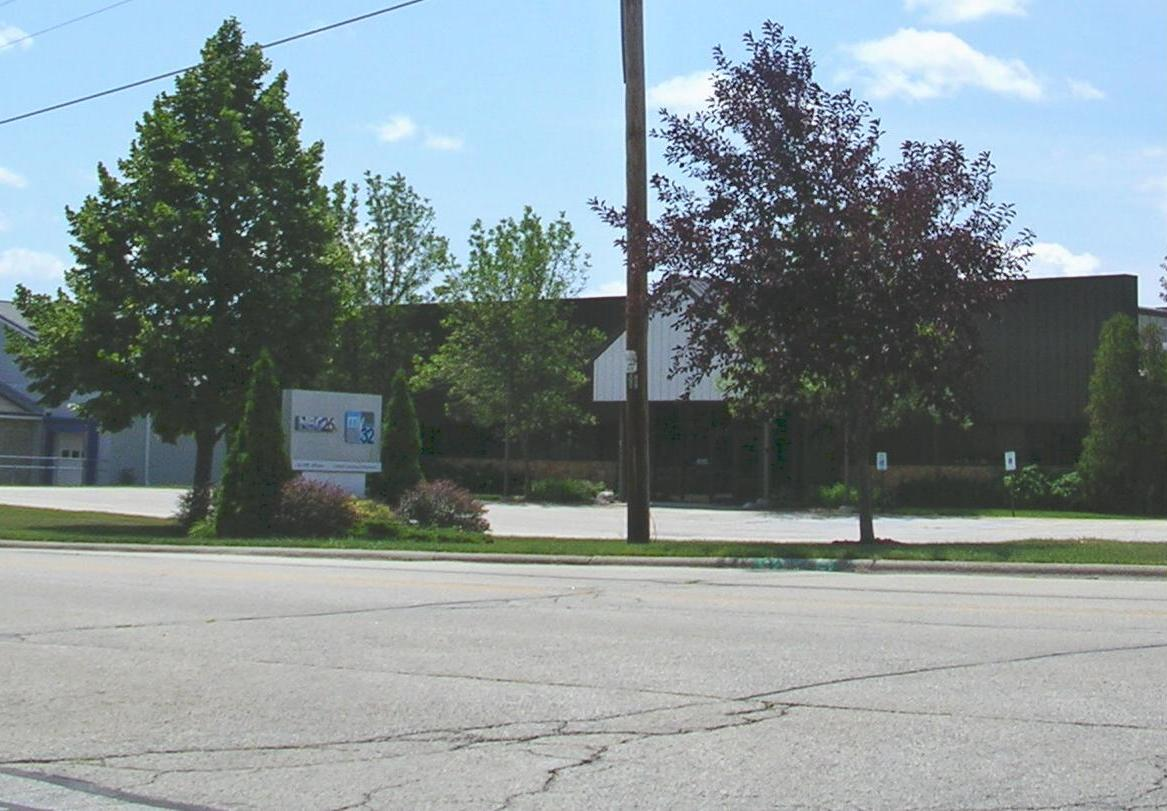
- The studios of WGBA-TV and WACY-TV in 2007
- Green Bay–Appleton, Wisconsin; United States
- City: Green Bay, Wisconsin
- Channels: Digital: 14 (UHF); Virtual: 26
- Branding: NBC 26

Programming
- Affiliations: 26.1/22.1: NBC; for others, see § Subchannels

Ownership
- Owner: E. W. Scripps Company; (Scripps Broadcasting Holdings LLC)
- Sister stations: WACY-TV

History
- First air date: December 31, 1980
- Former call signs: WLRE (1980–1985); WGBA (1985–2009; unsuffixed calls)
- Former channel numbers: Analog: 26 (UHF, 1980–2009); Digital: 41 (UHF, 2002–2018)
- Former affiliations: Independent (1980–1992); Fox (1992–1995)
- Call sign meaning: Green Bay & Appleton

Technical information
- Licensing authority: FCC
- Facility ID: 2708
- ERP: 500 kW
- HAAT: 369 m (1,211 ft)
- Transmitter coordinates: 44°21′30″N 87°58′48.4″W
- Translator(s): WLWK-CD 22 Sturgeon Bay

Links
- Public license information: Public file; LMS
- Website: www.nbc26.com

WGBA-TV (channel 26) is a television station in Green Bay, Wisconsin, United States, affiliated with NBC. It is owned by the E. W. Scripps Company alongside WACY-TV (channel 32), an independent station. The two stations share studios on North Road near the WIS 172 freeway in Ashwaubenon (with a Green Bay postal address); WGBA-TV's transmitter is located in the unincorporated community of Shirley, east of De Pere, Wisconsin.

WGBA-TV operates a Class A translator station in Door County, WLWK-CD (channel 22), licensed to Sturgeon Bay, which transmits from a site north of Sturgeon Bay on Door County Trunk Highway HH.

== History ==
=== Early years ===
WLRE, which stood for station co-founder Lyle R. Evans, sought to be operational as early as December 1977. It delayed so that it could put its transmission tower on Scray Hill near De Pere, the location of other Green Bay market transmitter towers. Ultimately the location was approved, but it meant ground was not broken on the studio and antenna location until June 1980. The station signed on the air on December 31, 1980, broadcasting an analog signal on UHF channel 26. It was the Green Bay market's second independent station, after the short-lived KFIZ-TV (channel 34) in Fond du Lac from 1968 to 1972. It was also the first new commercial station to sign-on in Green Bay itself since WFRV-TV (channel 5) signed on in May 1955. On November 12, 1982, WLRE was able to power up a new transmitter and had plans for further antenna power boosts.

In early 1983, coinciding with the purchase of a licensing deal of approximately 1,000 movies and other syndicated programs, WLRE took on the tagline "The Great Entertainer". In late 1984, the station's partnership was dissolved in a bankruptcy court in which investors lost money. In 1985, it was bought by Family Group Broadcasting Incorporated for only pennies on the dollar. On October 3 of that year, the station's call letters were changed to WGBA-TV. The station, then known on-air as "TV 26", was well known in its early years for children's program host "Cuddles the Clown", who stayed with the station until it switched to NBC, and moved to sister station WACY-TV (channel 32) before retiring. The station's imaging was also shared with sister station WQRF-TV in Rockford, Illinois; WVFT-TV in Roanoke, Virginia; WPGX-TV in Panama City, Florida; WFGX-TV in Fort Walton Beach, Florida; WLAX-TV in La Crosse, Wisconsin; and WLKT-TV in Lexington, Kentucky, including its early 'diamond' logo.

In the wake of a bankruptcy, Green Bay's original Fox affiliate WXGZ (channel 32) went dark on February 14, 1992. WGBA became the new affiliate the following day, changing its branding to "Fox 26". After Ace TV acquired the WXGZ license, WGBA helped to relaunch the station through a local marketing agreement in June 1994. That station became a charter affiliate of UPN and changed its call letters to WACY-TV in 1995. In 1994, during the first year of Fox's contract to broadcast NFL games, the station entered into a contract with ABC affiliate WBAY-TV (channel 2) to produce a pregame show to air before Green Bay Packers games since it lacked a local sports department. With Fox gaining rights to air NFC games, channel 26 became the Packers' unofficial home station (a role it would only hold for one season; since their switch to NBC, the station aired any Packer games from 1995 to 1997 when the team hosted an AFC team at Lambeau Field, and since 2006, all NBC Sunday Night Football games; it also was the station Super Bowl XXXII aired in the market).

=== NBC affiliation ===
In 1994, WLUK-TV (channel 11) and three other stations owned by Burnham Broadcasting were sold to SF Broadcasting (owned as a partnership between Savoy Communications and Fox). As part of the purchase and through Fox's ownership of the group, SF signed a group affiliation deal to switch its stations to Fox; this enabled WLUK to become the Packers' unofficial "home" station as Fox had acquired the television contract to the NFL's National Football Conference. Almost by default, WGBA was then left to take the NBC affiliation, one already passed down once from WFRV to WLUK in March 1983 due to the network's early 80s nadir and WFRV wanting to be associated with the top network in ABC. On August 28, 1995, WGBA-TV switched its affiliation to NBC; the Fox affiliation moved to former NBC affiliate WLUK.

Though it has remained known as "NBC26" since that date and been regarded as a solid small-market station by NBC itself through each of its ownerships, it has struggled to find a constant visual and local identity, even more so early on due to strained investment from its parent company, Aries Telecommunications (who purchased the station out of Family's bankruptcy in 1991), and which was the company's only broadcasting property besides the WACY LMA after WLAX/WEUX were sold off in 1996.

Green Bay's other three stations have been on-the-air since the 1950s and had loyal audiences, a challenge which was hard for a small company to overcome. Alone in the industry, Aries had to reckon with CBS's ownership of WFRV and WBAY's long-established 'first market station' reputation. WGBA also faced an uphill battle as the success of the Packers in the mid-to-late 90s was short-lived for the station after 1994, transferring after that one transitional year to WLUK with the station's former Fox affiliation, then NBC's AFC-limited schedule, followed by the network's hiatus from NFL coverage after 1998. This left channel 26 without anything from the Packers outside its station sportscast coverage for nearly a decade, creating a situation of a new Big Three affiliate in an NFL market unable to bring any attention to itself without any game play-by-play, and little financial ability to even bid for preseason rights, much less serve as the flagship of the Packers existing statewide network.

Relief did not come until October 2004, when the Journal Broadcast Group bought the station and WACY LMA for $43.2 million, as Aries looked to escape the industry, afraid the upcoming 2009 digital transition would leave the small company in a financiallly untenable position of having to build out two new digital transmission facilities for WGBA and WACY it could not afford. Journal had long wanted a station in Northeastern Wisconsin alongside its flagship station, WTMJ-TV in Milwaukee, that market's NBC affiliate and long-dominant news station.

Although Journal also wanted to buy WACY outright, this was unlikely at the time, since Green Bay has only seven full-power stations (not enough to legally permit a duopoly). However, in September 2010, WLUK owner LIN TV Corporation exercised an option to purchase CW affiliate WCWF (channel 14) from ACME Communications, and filed for a "failing station waiver" – which permits duopoly in such situations if the petitioner can prove the station is in an economically non-viable position – to allow LIN to own WLUK and WCWF. Because WCWF was hampered for years by several factors, including insufficient cable carriage and an analog signal originating more towards its city of license, Suring, than Green Bay, the waiver was granted in February 2011. Journal eventually plead to purchase WACY through the same waiver at the beginning of 2012, citing that station's dark period between 1992 and 1994 (when the Ace TV LMA began) and that the station was unable to survive on its own without the production and control assistance of WGBA. Because of this, the FCC allowed the full sale of WACY to Journal at the beginning of September 2012.

Since being acquired by Journal, WGBA and WTMJ have become close sister stations, eventually synchronizing their news imaging and sharing news and sports resources (WTMJ had previously paired with WFRV-TV, an NBC affiliate until the early 1980s, to provide Green Bay coverage and video). This became more evident in 2008, when WGBA outsourced sports and weekend weather reports to WTMJ, and had simulcast that station's morning and noon newscasts for a short time.

==== Summer 2013 Time Warner Cable carriage dispute ====
After several extensions of the original June 30, 2013, expired agreement, and the invocation of the sweeps rule disallowing cable providers from pulling the main signal of a carried station during local sweeps periods (which includes July), the main signals of WGBA and WACY were pulled off Time Warner Cable systems in the market at midnight on July 25, 2013. The MeTV subchannel had been pulled earlier on July 10 as those were not under the same protection under the sweeps rule. WTMJ was also affected in the Milwaukee market, along with Journal stations in Omaha and Palm Springs, California. The main effect of the blackout on Time Warner Cable systems was the carriage of three Packers preseason games on WTMJ and WGBA, which were blacked out on the provider due to the dispute, though the games were still available via the Spanish language simulcast using the Packers Television network camera positions produced for Milwaukee's Telemundo affiliate WYTU-LD (channel 63/49.4), which is carried on the subchannel tier in the Green Bay market (and was simulcast on WACY), with the suggestion to listen to English play-by-play via either WTMJ radio from Milwaukee or the local FM stations in Green Bay or Appleton carrying Packers Radio Network coverage. The later replays of the games were also available via replays on NFL Network through the week.

A class action lawsuit was also filed by viewers against Time Warner Cable on August 8 under grounds of breach of contract. Journal Broadcast Group has also made claims via its website detailing their version of the carriage dispute that TWC was distracted due to the other dispute involving CBS Corporation's Television Stations group and Showtime Networks premium channel suites.

By August 15, WGBA and WACY's channel slots on Time Warner Cable were replaced with a simulcast of GSN, with Starz Kids & Family airing on the channel 994 subchannel slot usually carrying MeTV. Journal Broadcast Group also asked state authorities to intervene in their dispute with Time Warner Cable.

Journal and Time Warner Cable came to an agreement for carriage on September 20, 2013, to last at least through the 2016 Summer Olympics, returning WGBA and WACY to their lineups as of 7 p.m. that evening. However, Journal conceded that the analog and cable-ready positions were less important than carriage in the high definition tier, so while WGBA's high definition signal remained on channel 1007, the standard definition signal moved to channel 13, WACY's former SD slot, with WACY shifting to channel 83 with high definition coverage coming at the start of the year. However, MeTV subchannel 26.2 remained removed from Time Warner systems, though southern portions of the Green Bay market already receive MeTV Milwaukee flagship WBME-CD (channel 41) on the basic lifeline tier.

==== Sale to the E. W. Scripps Company ====
On July 30, 2014, the E. W. Scripps Company announced that it would acquire Journal Communications in an all-stock transaction. The combined firm would retain their broadcast properties, including WTMJ-TV and its radio siblings, with the print assets being spun off as Journal Media Group. The deal was approved by the FCC on December 12, 2014, with shareholders of the two companies approving it on March 11, 2015; the merger/spin-off between Journal and Scripps formally closed on April 1.

Scripps and Time Warner Cable announced a new multi-year carriage agreement on February 1, 2016, that includes WGBA and WACY, well ahead of the 2016 Summer Olympics and averting any carriage issues for the Games. This also returned all WGBA subchannels to Time Warner systems in the area on channels 990 and 991, which occurred on April 4, 2016.

== Programming ==
=== Packers partnership ===
On March 2, 2012, the Green Bay Packers and Journal announced that WTMJ would be retained as the Official Packers Station in the Milwaukee market after the expiration of the previous agreement, and that WGBA would become the official station for the team in the Green Bay market beginning in August 2012, replacing former partner WFRV-TV. As a result, WGBA carries the majority of the team's preseason schedule (the game broadcasts use CBS Sports announcers, with the NBC Sunday Night Football graphics package) along with Packers Live Tuesday nights and Total Packers with Matt LaFleur on Wednesday evenings before prime time, and the Inside Lambeau program on Sunday nights, along with other official team programming; the station also provides gametime and 'ride home' forecasts for the "TundraVision" scoreboard displays at Lambeau Field during Packers home games. The first preseason game of 2012 was a national ESPN game against the San Diego Chargers on August 9 and aired on WBAY-TV, precluding a situation where NBC's non-preemptable coverage of the Summer Olympics would have forced WGBA to move that game to WACY instead (that situation also occurred four years later due to the 2016 Summer Olympics for two games). In addition, the station also held the rights to the September 13 Thursday Night Football game of the Packers–Bears rivalry broadcast on cable/satellite on NFL Network, a network unavailable to much of the Green Bay market at the time due to conflicts with Time Warner Cable (three weeks later Time Warner added the network to its systems); this unusually forced the season seven finale of America's Got Talent to air the same night over WACY (the station's first move of NBC programming to that station in a pre-emption situation), and re-air after Saturday Night Live on September 15 on WGBA due to the preemption. As an NBC affiliate, WGBA broadcasts Packers games that are played on Sunday Night Football. For the 2016 and 2017 seasons, the station also aired Packers appearances on NBC's portion of the Thursday Night Football contract, along with the November 17, 2022, Packers game against the Tennessee Titans on Amazon Prime Video. It also carried the team's first London appearance in the NFL International Series on October 9 against the New York Giants at Tottenham Hotspur Stadium.

Larry McCarren, who had been the sports director at WFRV until the Packers contract ended in March 2012, along with budget cuts at that station, went over to Journal in July 2012; however he was only able to do short Packer analysis segments through the 2012 season on-air for WTMJ and WGBA, along with blogging on WTMJ's site, due to a one-year non-compete clause (which included these segments by contractual force originating outside the Green Bay market in Milwaukee), but continued his duties as color commentator over Journal's Packers Radio Network. With the expiration of the clause, McCarren assumed sports director duties for WGBA on April 1, 2013. Packers Live, a program that resembles his former Locker Room program, with Packer player guests and "chalk talk" play analysis in front of a live audience, also began airing on the station beginning with the 2013 NFL season. He retired as WGBA sports director in April 2015 to fully focus on his television and radio network duties for the Packers and Scripps (as of the fall 2018 purchase of Scripps' Milwaukee radio stations by Good Karma Brands, his radio duties are now with that group).

=== News operation ===
A secondary version of WGBA's logo, formerly primary until the channel number and NBC logo were isolated in 2021. Currently used mainly for station identification purposes.

WGBA-TV broadcasts 24 1/2 hours of locally produced newscasts each week (with 4 1/2 hours each weekday and one hour each on Saturdays and Sundays). In addition to its main studios, the station operates a Fox Cities Bureau in Downtown Appleton on West College Avenue. WGBA operates its own weather radar from the North Road studios. In addition to local insertions during Today, WGBA also carries news and weather updates during the noon hour weekdays during NBC News Daily at around 20 and 50 minutes past the hour.

In early 1996, shortly after WGBA picked up the NBC affiliation, then-owner Aries Telecommunications announced plans to start a full-fledged news department for the station. On July 19, 1996, during the start of NBC's coverage of the 1996 Summer Olympics, WGBA debuted its local newscasts, with a half-hour early-evening newscast at 6 p.m. on Mondays through Saturdays (the initial broadcast of that program on July 19 ran a special one-hour broadcast, leading into NBC's coverage of the Olympic Opening Ceremonies in Atlanta) and a late evening newscast at 10 p.m. seven nights a week. Ted O'Connell was WGBA's first news director; he was succeeded by Ashley Webster (now a journalist with Fox Business Network), who also served as weeknight co-anchor alongside Heather Hays (presently a main anchor at Fox owned-and-operated station KDFW in Dallas-Fort Worth). Eventually as the operation grew, the station added newscasts on weekday mornings, weekdays at noon and at 5 p.m.

WGBA's newscasts have consistently rated fourth in the market, behind WBAY, WLUK and WFRV. Ratings were unable to improve after the Journal purchase, even with the ties to WTMJ's news department, which had issues in itself in the Milwaukee market. The Great Recession in particular starkly brought these issues on-air. On June 3, 2008, Journal announced that WGBA's sports department would shut down and that it would be laying off sports anchors Ted Stefaniak and John Burton. Until Larry McCarren took over as sports director in April 2013, sports segments were taped in advance and originated from WTMJ's facilities (on East Capitol Drive/WIS 190 in Milwaukee's Far North Side section) using its personnel.

On July 14, 2008, due to low ratings and inconsistent viewership, WGBA discontinued its weekday morning and noon newscasts, while laying off some of its staff. In place of those shows, the station began simulcasting WTMJ's morning and midday newscasts Live at Daybreak (now known as TMJ4 News Today) and Live at Noon, interspersed with local weather cut-ins presented by a meteorologist from WGBA's Green Bay studios (again, recorded in advance since WTMJ was already live in its own market), but with no regard to coverage of Fox Valley and Green Bay news. Due to the latter issue, in January 2009, the weekday morning simulcast was dropped and turned into a WGBA-produced rolling weather block called Non-Stop Weather. WTMJ's weekday noon broadcast was later moved to WACY and replaced in that timeslot on WGBA by paid programming, which for a time in 2008, filled some of the station's early afternoon schedule due to an unusual number of syndicated program cancellations in that year. The midday news simulcast on WACY and paid programming on WGBA were eventually dropped as well.

On April 7, 2009, WTMJ became the first station in Milwaukee to begin broadcasting its local newscasts in high definition. However, until April 2012, the pre-taped nightly sports and weekend weather segments originating from WTMJ were broadcast in 4:3 standard definition. On July 24, it was announced that WGBA would eliminate some of its reporting and photojournalist positions, with the remaining staff being retrained to act as "one-man band" videojournalists handling reporting, camera work, and editing stories themselves. In September 2009, reporter Bonnie Kirschman, the final employee to remain with WGBA's news operation since its 1996 launch, left the station.

In mid-August 2009, the weekday morning weather block was canceled entirely and replaced by the now-canceled syndicated lifestyle talk show Better, which moved to the 5 a.m. hour followed by encore broadcasts of the previous night's 10 p.m. newscast and Early Today before Today. On January 10, 2011, WGBA restored a weekday morning newscast to its schedule under the slightly revised title of NBC 26 News Today from a new secondary set exclusively used for the program. In August 2012, the Valley news bureau, which had been in operation since July 1996, was shut down.

On April 7, 2012, WGBA upgraded its local newscasts to 16:9 widescreen standard definition. It became the last station in the market to convert to full high-definition operations on January 23, 2016, with the unveiling of a new chyron-heavy "virtual" set, the first major change to the station's newsroom and set since the station began carrying newscasts in 1996 and the newsroom and anchor sets were split off in the early 2000s via an opaque partition. The station began to use the default Scripps graphics package/news music package in October 2016.

In October 2014, the station added Wisconsin Tonight, a pre-prime time newsmagazine to nights without Packers team programming which features news rundowns, feature segments and various NBC affiliate service reports, along with some shared content from WTMJ, which also carried their own edition of Wisconsin Tonight; this averted a situation where Inside Edition, which was moved to an earlier timeslot, might only air up to two of their five programs a week on the station in the fall and early winter. That show moved to WBAY in the fall of 2015; it has aired on WLUK since fall 2023. Starting with the 2016 Summer Olympics, the station launched Scripps' national programs The List and Right This Minute in the 4 p.m. timeslot. In June 2017, Wisconsin Tonight was retitled The Now Wisconsin, in line with Scripps' branding for their feature-heavy local newscast format which WTMJ also took up; the Wisconsin Tonight title remained in use for a Saturday night advertorial program, presumably to prevent trademark dilution where another state station can claim the title for their program; it has intermittently aired since September 2017.

On June 15, 2020, WGBA began producing a 9 p.m. newscast for WACY entitled My News at 9, the first time WLUK-TV's 9 p.m. news has had competition; the latter half hour is filled with a same-night replay of NBC26 Tonight, the station's local version of Scripps' national program The Now (it is unknown if WGBA's Packers Television Network programming will repeat in the fall in that timeslot).

==== National attention on the Internet ====
In 2012, two segments from WGBA's morning newscasts gained notice on the Internet. In January of that year, a video showing meteorologist Brian Niznansky (now WTMJ-TV's chief meteoroligist) falling victim to an on-air prank went viral in which Niznansky was tricked into saying, "I love lamp," a line from the film Anchorman: The Legend of Ron Burgundy. By October 2012, the video was viewed nearly two million times on YouTube. The prank was featured on several news sites, including on the front page of MSN at one point.

In September 2012, on the day following the controversial NFL game between the Green Bay Packers and Seattle Seahawks, the station did a segment on its morning newscast with a "replacement weather guy", poking fun at the NFL replacement referees. WGBA floor director Tom Legener was seen on-air forecasting a "thunderblizzard hurricane", with a temperature of "−200 °F (−129 °C)" at 7 a.m. and "−346 °F (−210.0 °C)" at noon. The video went viral, and by October 2012, had nearly 600,000 views on YouTube. It was featured on various news sites, including CNN, ESPN, Yahoo!, and MSN.

==== Notable current on-air staff ====
- Larry McCarren – former sports director; remains as Packers Live host

== Technical information ==
=== Subchannels ===
The station's signal is multiplexed:

Subchannels of WGBA-TV
Subchannel		Res.	Short name	Programming
WGBA-TV	WLWK-CD	Res.	Short name	Programming
26.1	22.1	1080i	WGBA-HD	NBC
26.2	22.2	480i	IonPlus	Ion Plus
26.3	22.3	480i	GRIT	Grit
26.4	22.4	480i	ION	Ion
26.5	22.5	480i	HSN	HSN
26.6	22.6	480i	QVC	QVC
26.7	22.7	480i	QVC2	QVC2
26.8	22.8	480i	ONTV4U	OnTV4U

WGBA launched a new second digital subchannel in November 2010 carrying TheCoolTV which had aired on the WTMJ's second subchannel since the summer of 2009. The establishment of WGBA-DT2 made it the second commercial station in the market to launch a subchannel service after WBAY-TV. On September 7, 2011, Journal and Weigel Broadcasting announced that WGBA would carry MeTV beginning on October 1, 2011. MeTV replaced TheCoolTV on 26.2 on that date, as Journal brought a lawsuit against TheCoolTV's parent company Cool Music Network, LLC for non-payment of services; WTMJ-TV, along with Journal's other stations dropped the network on October 1, 2011, to carry Live Well Network or MeTV, depending on the market. Sometime in the summer of 2016, 26.2 was converted to a widescreen presentation in line with Weigel converting their networks to that format.

On May 18, 2015, Scripps and Katz Broadcasting announced an affiliation agreement allowing Scripps' Green Bay duopoly to carry all three of Katz's digital broadcast networks in the near future, with WGBA carrying Laff and WACY carrying Escape and Grit (Laff launched one month earlier in markets with Scripps-owned stations not affected by its merger with the Journal Broadcasting Group, while the two others will also begin to be carried by select sister stations of WGBA through the deal). Laff debuted as a digital subchannel on August 12, 2015.

In late April 2019, WGBA was revealed as launching a fourth digital subchannel for Katz's relaunch of Court TV on May 8, 2019. At the end of October 2021, the station picked up Ion Television (formerly a WBAY subchannel since 2015), which had come under common Scripps ownership in January 2021. In December 2021, a minor switch of subchannels occurred, with WGBA-DT3 becoming the new home of Grit, and WACY-DT2 taking Laff.

The station ended its MeTV affiliation on October 1, 2022, due to corporate mandates involving Scripps preferring their networks be carried on their stations, with Defy TV replacing it and two subchannels for the QVC networks added on the same day. MeTV's owner Weigel Broadcasting has since launched a new Shawano-licensed station on channel 31, WMEI, on June 20, 2024, with MeTV, in addition to subchannels carrying MeTV+, MeTV Toons, Story Television and Movies!.

On July 1, 2024, subchannel 2 was switched without notice from Defy TV to ION Plus.

=== Analog-to-digital conversion ===
WGBA-TV shut down its analog signal, over UHF channel 26, on June 12, 2009, the official date on which full-power television stations in the United States transitioned from analog to digital broadcasts under federal mandate. The station's digital signal remained on its pre-transition UHF channel 41, using virtual channel 26.

One week after the transition, Journal chose to suffix all of their owned television stations with the "-TV" suffix as part of the FCC's one-time allowance during the transition to allow stations to suffix either "-TV" or "-DT" to their call signs if not previously included on their permanent digital channel; this included WGBA, which became WGBA-TV in FCC correspondence and on-air station identifications upon that day.

On July 1, 2019, WGBA's digital signal moved from channel 41 to channel 14 as part of the FCC spectrum repack.

=== Translator ===
City of license	Callsign	Channel	ERP	HAAT	Facility ID	Transmitter coordinates
Sturgeon Bay	WLWK-CD	19 (UHF, VC 22)	4.1 kW	195.8 m (642.4 ft)	2711	44°54′13.7″N 87°22′08.2″W

In addition to its main signal, WGBA operates a translator to extend the station's coverage northward. This is a remnant of the analog era when it was Green Bay's only major UHF commercial television station. The station in fact kept a post office box address open for years to allow responses to an offer through a station promo of a free pamphlet describing the installation of a UHF television antenna to interested viewers until the early 1990s. During that period, residents of Northern Door County and the southern portion of Michigan's Upper Peninsula could easily receive the three Green Bay network stations on VHF and WFRV semi-satellite WJMN-TV from Escanaba, Michigan, along with PBS member station WNMU from Marquette, Michigan, but not WGBA and PBS Wisconsin's WPNE-TV (channel 38); the latter is served by Sister Bay translator W15DJ-D.

WLWK-CD (channel 22) in Sturgeon Bay is officially licensed as a Class A station; this translator was known as W22BW prior to November 27, 2012. Journal and Scripps used the Sturgeon Bay station to warehouse several call letters utilized by its FM station on 94.5 in the Milwaukee market to prevent re-use by competitors. It first carried WKTI, a call sign that had been in use from 1974 to 2008, and were previously warehoused on former sister station WJBE (1040 AM) in Powell, Tennessee, which serves the Knoxville market, until December 2012, when that station was sold to local interests. The calls came back into use in the Milwaukee market as of early June 2015, when Scripps switched 94.5 back to WKTI this time under a country format. WKTI-CD then changed its call sign to WLWK-CD on June 17, 2015, as the WLWK calls used between 2008 and 2015 (standing for "The Lake Milwaukee") on the 94.5 frequency had to be warehoused themselves to prevent a station in Racine trying to claim the station's former branding and variety hits format after Scripps dropped it. Scripps sold the Milwaukee radio stations in 2018 to Good Karma Brands, making it unlikely any other calls will be warehoused on channel 22.

==== Former translators ====
Before it became an NBC affiliate, WGBA was rebroadcast in Michigan's Upper Peninsula on W02AM (channel 2) in Gwinn, W09BA (channel 9) in Felch, W49AF (channel 49) in Crystal Falls, and W56BF (channel 56) in Iron Mountain. The last translator was encrypted and part of the now-defunct over-the-air cable system in the area.

WGBA-TV formerly operated analog translator W31BK in Menominee, Michigan.
