= WWUS =

- Big Pine Key, Florida; United States
- Broadcast area: Florida Keys, Florida
- Frequency: 104.1 MHz
- Branding: US 1 104.1 FM

Programming
- Format: Classic hits

Ownership
- Owner: Joseph Fiorini; (Fiorini Keys Media, LLC)
- Sister stations: WCNK, WAVK, WAIL, WCTH, WFKZ, WEOW, WKWF

History
- First air date: September 22, 1980 (at 93.5)
- Former frequencies: 93.5 MHz (1980–1983); 104.7 MHz (1983–2002)
- Call sign meaning: W W US-1

Technical information
- Facility ID: 14346
- Class: C1
- ERP: 100,000 watts
- HAAT: 168 meters (453 ft)
- Transmitter coordinates: 24°39′48″N 81°25′10″W

Links
- Webcast: Listen live
- Website: us1radio.com

WWUS (104.1 FM), known as "US-1 Radio", is a radio station in the Florida Keys, based in Big Pine Key, Florida.

The station airs classic hits (R&B, pop, and rock music from the mid-1950s through the early-1990s) as well as talk programming.

WWUS covers the lower and middle Keys, and reaches the coast of Cuba near Havana. This stations are also part of the family with WAVK from Marathon Key, part of Fiorini Keys Media, LLC.

== History ==
Originally, US-1 Radio broadcast on 93.5 FM at a lower power. It is now one of the more powerful stations in the Florida Keys and provides news and hurricane warnings for sailors and citizens of the Keys.

In August 2013, Gamma Broadcasting, LLC reached a deal to sell its Florida Keys stations (including WWUS) to Florida Keys Media, LLC (a company controlled by Robert H. Holladay). The sale of WWUS and WCNK, at a price of $475,000, was consummated on January 31, 2014.

In July 2024 the station was sold to Fiorini Keys Media, LLC

WWUS was honored with the 2018 National Association of Broadcasters Macaroni Award for small market radio station of the year. The news department was honored twice with the Radio Television Digital News Association National Edward R. Murrow Award, in 1999 for best small market radio continuing coverage of Hurricane Georges, and again in 2011 for best small market radio newscast, Evening Edition.
