= John M. Spottswood =

American politician

John Maloney Spottswood
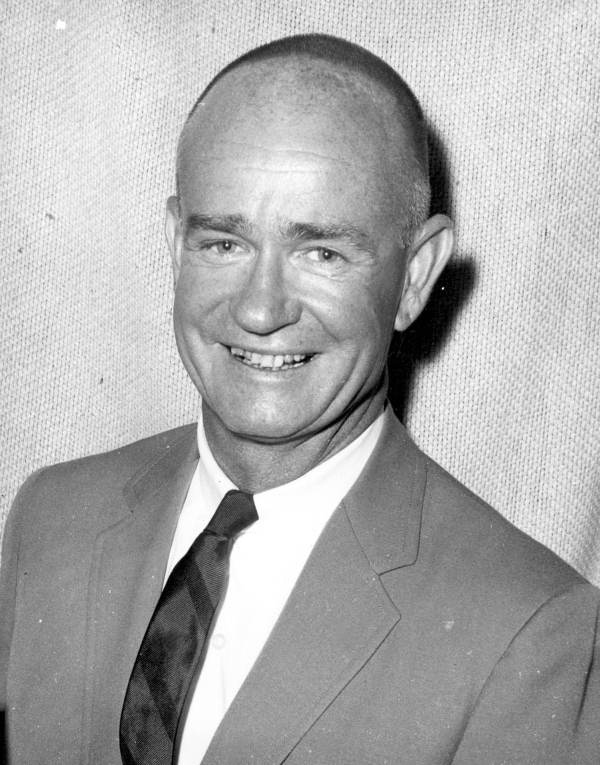
- Spottswood in 1967

Member of the Florida Senate from the 41st district
- In office January 3, 1963 – January 3, 1971
- Preceded by: Abraham Wilkins
- Succeeded by: Position abolished

President of the Florida Association of Realtors
- In office May 21, 1961 – September 27, 1975
- Preceded by: Elliott Smelders
- Succeeded by: Alaster Smith

Sheriff of Monroe County, Florida
- In office January 15, 1952 – January 4, 1963
- Deputy: Morgan Fusk, Paul J. Upton
- Preceded by: Paul J. Upton
- Succeeded by: Paul J. Upton

Personal details
- Born: John Maloney Spottswood; June 17, 1920 Key West, Florida, U.S.
- Died: September 27, 1975 Miami, Florida, U.S.
- Party: Democratic
- Spouse: Mary Myrtle Sellers (1949–1975)
- Children: 5
- Profession: Realtor, Radio Host, Film Maker

Military service
- Allegiance: United States
- Branch/service: United States Army
- Years of service: 1941–1945 (Reserve)

John Maloney Spottswood (June 17, 1920 – September 27, 1975) was an American politician and member of the Democratic Party who served as the senior Florida State Senator from the 41st district, in office from 1963 to 1971.

== Biography ==
Spottswood was born and raised in Key West, Florida, where he was educated in the Monroe County Public School System and later Riverside Military Academy. His father, Robert F. Spottswood, served as colonel in the United States Army and was a direct descendant of Alexander Spotswood, the first Colonial Governor of Virginia. In 1941, John enlisted in the United States Army for World War II in the Philippines (Pacific Theatre). Afterwards, he moved back to Key West and established the first radio station there, WKWF in 1944, and became friends with President Harry S. Truman who was a frequent visitor of the island. He also established cable television in Monroe County and assisted its spread nationwide. Spottswood married Mary Myrtle Sellers in 1949 and they went on to have five children. He was a film producer in the 1950s and 60's and worked with Warner Brothers in a documentary on John F. Kennedy's military service in the Solomon Islands and his handling of the Cuban Missile Crisis which he received an award for. He was elected Sheriff for Monroe County in 1952 and established the first Youth Police Training Ranch in the country.

Spottswood was a licensed realtor and hotelier who owned his own real estate company Spottswood and Sons which bought the La Concha and Casa Marina Hotels and still exists today as Spottswood, Spottswood, and Spottswood. Furthermore, he served as President of the Florida Association of Realtors from 1961 until his death and modernized real estate in Florida. In 1962, he was elected Florida State Senator from the 41st district and held that position for four terms. Afterwards, he moved to Miami, Florida, where he died from a cardiac arrest at the age of 55 in 1975. He is currently buried at the Key West Cemetery.
