= Locker room (disambiguation) =

A changing room, also known as a locker room, is a room or area dedicated to changing clothes.

Locker room may also refer to:

- Locker Room (TV series), a Canadian television series
- Locker Room (album), the third studio album by Double Exposure
- Locker Room (WFRV-TV), a live talk show hosted by Burke Griffin
