= WCTH =

- Plantation Key, Florida; United States
- Broadcast area: Florida Keys area
- Frequency: 100.3 MHz
- Branding: Thunder Country 100.3

Programming
- Format: Country music
- Affiliations: Westwood One

Ownership
- Owner: Joseph Fiorini; (Fiorini Keys Media, LLC)
- Sister stations: WAIL, WFKZ, WEOW, WAVK, WCNK, WWUS

History
- First air date: 1969
- Former call signs: WPLC (CP; 1966-1967; never used on air); WXOS (1967–1987)
- Call sign meaning: "Thunder Country" (backwards)

Technical information
- Licensing authority: FCC
- Facility ID: 60910
- Class: C1
- ERP: 100,000 watts
- HAAT: 141 meters
- Transmitter coordinates: 24°57′34.00″N 80°34′30.00″W

Links
- Public license information: Public file; LMS
- Webcast: Listen Live
- Website: thundercountry.com

WCTH (100.3 FM) is a radio station broadcasting a country music format. Licensed to Plantation Key, Florida, United States, the station serves the Florida Keys area. The station is currently owned by licensee Fiorini Keys Media, LLC, and features programming from Westwood One.

On January 25, 2008, it was announced that WCTH was one of several Clear Channel radio stations to be sold, in order to remain under the ownership caps following the sale of Clear Channel to private investors. Until it was sold, WCTH and other stations to be sold were placed into the Aloha Stations Trust.

The trust sold WCTH and three sister stations to Robert Holladay's Florida Keys Media, LLC for $650,000; the transaction was consummated February 28, 2014.

In July 2024 the station was sold to Fiorini Keys Media, LLC
