= WTVQ-DT =

Television station in Lexington, Kentucky

- Lexington, Kentucky; United States
- Channels: Digital: 27 (UHF); Virtual: 36
- Branding: LEX 36, My KY (36.2)

Programming
- Affiliations: 36.1: ABC; 36.2: Independent with MyNetworkTV; for others, see § Subchannels

Ownership
- Owner: E. W. Scripps Company; (Scripps Broadcasting Holdings LLC)
- Sister stations: WLEX-TV

History
- First air date: June 2, 1968
- Former call signs: WBLG-TV (1968–1973); WTVQ-TV (1973–2009)
- Former channel numbers: Analog: 62 (UHF, 1968–1980), 36 (UHF, 1980–2009); Digital: 40 (UHF, 2000–2019)

Technical information
- Licensing authority: FCC
- Facility ID: 51597
- ERP: 487 kW
- HAAT: 285 m (935 ft)
- Transmitter coordinates: 38°2′3″N 84°23′39″W

Links
- Public license information: Public file; LMS

WTVQ-DT (channel 36) is a television station in Lexington, Kentucky, United States, affiliated with ABC and MyNetworkTV. It is owned by the E. W. Scripps Company alongside NBC affiliate WLEX-TV (channel 18). The two stations share studios on Russell Cave Road (KY 353) in Lexington and transmitter facilities on the outer loop of Man o' War Boulevard (KY 1425) in the Brighton section of Fayette County (adjacent to WTVQ-DT's former studios).

The station began broadcasting on channel 62 as WBLG-TV in 1968 and has been an ABC affiliate for its entire history. It changed its call sign to WTVQ in 1973 and moved to channel 36 in 1980. With the exception of most of the 1990s, the station's local newscasts have generally rated third out of the four main TV newsrooms in Lexington. Scripps acquired WTVQ from Morris Multimedia in 2026.

== History ==
=== WBLG-TV ===
==== Construction ====
On October 8, 1965, WBLG-TV, Inc. filed an application with the Federal Communications Commission (FCC) to build a new television station on channel 62, the last commercial frequency available in the Lexington market. WBLG-TV, Inc. was a 50-50 partnership between Lexington-area businessman Roy White and Reeves Broadcasting Corporation. White already owned local radio station WBLG (1300 AM) and would act as the entity's new president and general manager. Reeves chairman J. Drayton Hastie served as the chairman of WBLG-TV, Inc. Reeves owned WOWK-TV in Huntington, West Virginia, and WCBD-TV in Charleston, South Carolina, as well as radio stations in Baltimore. The owners estimated the cost of constructing the station would be in excess of $1 million, and the station would be equipped to broadcast in color from the start.

On June 24, 1966, WBLG-TV's application was designated for hearing alongside a competing application from Kentucky Central Life Insurance Company (owner of WVLK radio). However, on January 27, 1967, Kentucky Central Life announced that it would purchase existing station WKYT-TV (channel 27) from Taft Broadcasting for $2.5 million, signaling its exit from the channel 62 hearing. With no other applicants for the channel 62 allocation, the FCC granted initial approval of the station's application on July 28, 1967.

Architectural rendering of WBLG-TV's original broadcast facilities, in use by the station from its launch until 2026.

Meanwhile, the WBLG-TV partnership acquired land at the intersection of Winchester Pike and Bryant Road (now Man o' War Boulevard), which would serve as the new studio and transmitting facilities for the station. As the area surrounding the proposed site was primarily agricultural in nature, having previously been used as a farm, the land needed to be rezoned before construction could begin. Approval for the rezoning came on November 10, 1967, despite objection from two local residents who lived near the proposed location. Central to their complaints was the proposed 990-foot (302 m) tower, which they felt was "unsightly"; they were also concerned that the tower might fall. Approval was granted on the condition that the entrance/exit to the station be on Bryant Road only and that screening devices be provided between the station and adjacent residences. The building permit for the actual building then came on December 12, 1967, with approval being granted for a one-story structure on the site, built at a cost of $149,000.

==== WBLG-TV signs-on ====
The station launched at 9:30 a.m. on June 2, 1968, as an ABC affiliate, broadcasting from the highest above sea level tower in Kentucky. Lexington's then-Mayor Charles Wylie was on hand with White and daughter Barbara to throw the switch that brought the station on the air. WBLG-TV originally branded as "The ENTERTAINMENT Channel–62 WBLG-TV". WKYT, the former primary affiliate of ABC, became the market's CBS affiliate in January, ahead of WBLG-TV's sign-on. By the station's eighth week on the air, it had already managed to capture a 30% share of the prime time audience in the market according to a station-commissioned American Research Bureau survey, putting it on par with the other two local stations. On September 7, It Takes a Thief star Malachi Throne and Ed Allen Time host Ed Allen appeared at a public open house at the station's studios to officially "Grand Open" WBLG-TV. The FCC granted WBLG-TV its permanent license on August 5, 1970.

On May 7, 1973, it was announced that WBLG-TV would be sold to New Orleans–based Starr Broadcasting Group, Inc. at a price exceeding $2 million. Starr was headed by company president Peter M. Starr, with William F. Buckley Jr. serving as Starr's chairman of the board. Starr had owned WCYB-TV in Bristol, Virginia, and radio stations in Arkansas, California, Kansas, New Jersey, South Dakota, Tennessee, and Texas; it was also in the process of purchasing KHVH-AM-TV in Honolulu at the same time. This came after talks to merge Reeves' holdings into Starr failed. Control was transferred on November 14, 1973. WBLG radio was not affected by this sale and was subsequently sold the following summer to North Carolina–based Village Communications.

=== WTVQ-TV ===
==== New owners, new call letters ====
The new owners immediately sought to make their mark on their new purchase. The first such step came when the present WTVQ-TV call letters were adopted on December 20, 1973. Starr would also move its corporate base of operations to Lexington shortly after the acquisition of WTVQ was completed. In December 1974, WTVQ applied to operate a translator on channel 58 in Frankfort, which at the time was a part of the Louisville market. In 1975, WTVQ became the first television station in Lexington to experiment with 24-hour operations when it aired Blockbuster Movie Madness, which delivered four feature films from the late-evening hours right through the next morning. By 1978, WTVQ had become Lexington's first television station to implement electronic news gathering and shoot its stories on tape, whereas its competitors were still shooting with film.

==== Move to channel 36; sale to the Disney family ====
However, Starr began to pour the foundation for the biggest move in the station's history: literally. In January 1977, WTVQ petitioned the FCC to allow them to move to channel 36, in a move the station said was needed to evenly compete with WLEX-TV (channel 18) and WKYT-TV. The station noted that channel 62 suffered from technical interference and signal quality issues due to its higher position on the dial. To make the move happen, two unused allocations would need to be moved. Channel 36 would need to be moved from Portsmouth, Ohio, into Lexington; channel 55 would be re-located from Glasgow, Kentucky, to Portsmouth to fill the void, then the soon-to-be-discarded channel 62 allocation would be moved from Lexington to Glasgow. Kentucky Educational Television, the statewide PBS member, initially opposed the move, fearing that they would lose potential viewers who, in tuning to channel 62, had to dial past its station, WKLE, on channel 46 and might have sampled its programming. On May 3, 1979, the move to channel 36 was officially given the green light by the FCC. The FCC gave the station one year from June 4 to make the move. While objections were lodged from potential station owners in the Louisville and Florence areas, they were rejected by the FCC, believing that the public would be better served by having WTVQ on channel 36.

Meanwhile, in May 1978, Starr announced that it would be acquired by Los Angeles–based Shamrock Broadcasting Inc. in a $21.6 million all-cash, all-stock deal. Shamrock was wholly owned by Roy E. Disney, nephew of Walt and son of Walt's brother Roy O. Disney. The FCC approved the transaction on June 8, 1979, and it closed on July 18. The deal had been held up as Buckley and three other company principals were being investigated by the Securities and Exchange Commission for defrauding and misleading investors. Buckley agreed to pay back $1.4 million in cash and stock to shareholders and not serve as a director of any publicly traded company for five years. Buckley denied any wrongdoing.

"We want to demonstrate that the way things were done here in the past is not the way Shamrock operates."

— Bruce F. Johnson, Shamrock president and chief executive officer, February 1980, outlining the changes the new ownership planned on making to WTVQ

WTVQ, now under Shamrock, began to prepare for its move to channel 36 by making station wide changes that included the firing of then-general manager Jeff Evans (blamed on heavy turnover in the months following Shamrock's takeover of the station), the first building expansion in the station's history with new equipment (estimated to cost between $1.3 to $2 million), a $300,000 investment into the news department, an expansion of the 5:30 p.m. evening news from a half-hour to a full hour, and a "major emphasis on public affairs and community involvement". Shamrock's president and CEO, Bruce F. Johnson, vowed to "demonstrate that the way things were done here in the past is not the way Shamrock operates".

Morale in the newsroom was high; newly hired news director Clark Edwards noticed that "people were going about their jobs with a new drive after the change". Longtime weatherman Frank Faulconer, the only on-air personality remaining after the resignations, left for WKYT to help launch the station's new morning show, where he had hoped to "finish out my career". Faulconer worked at WKYT for exactly two days in February before returning to WTVQ and resuming his usual weeknight weather duties. However, a setback occurred as new news director Edwards would resign after just ten days on the job. Station officials were concerned that he had been falsifying details about his background—specifically claiming that he had held a doctorate degree in political science. When management asked Edwards to present proof of this, he was unable.

The change to channel 36 was originally scheduled to take place on June 1 but had to be postponed due to delays from RCA, the manufacturer of the new $1 million channel 36 transmitter. Finally, on June 21, 1980, WTVQ-TV signed off channel 62 for the last time just after midnight. Riggers began removing the channel 62 antenna from the station's tower, and installed the new channel 36 antenna. Management boasted that the new signal, double the power output of the channel 62 signal, would fill-in holes in the station's coverage area. The station claimed that the new 2,150,000-watt signal was the most powerful in the commonwealth. Some areas of Lexington, such as Chevy Chase, would be able to receive a clear signal from the station for the first time ever. CEO Johnson stated that Shamrock was investing over $2 million for these signal improvements. New newscast opening music and on-air imaging would accompany the channel change.

Management had hoped to be on the air by Monday, June 23, in time to broadcast that evening's ABC prime time lineup. However, the crew realized that the channel 62 antenna was heavier than they realized, which required them to remove it in sections. That, along with high winds on Tuesday, delayed the sign-on of channel 36 to Wednesday, June 25. Channel 36 beamed to life for the first time in Lexington at 2:18 p.m. with a test pattern. Forty minutes later, the national anthem was broadcast, completing the move to channel 36. WTVQ's old channel 62 transmitter was sold to a group that intended on starting a new station on channel 61 in Ashland, Kentucky (the transmitter would be retuned for use on that channel). (Channel 62, which remained allocated to Lexington and was not moved to Glasgow as originally proposed, would later be re-used by short-lived independent station WLKT and subsequent low-power station WBLU-LP.)

Months after the move to channel 36 and improved product, tragedy struck at the station. Twenty-eight-year-old weekend anchor Tom Howell died when his car collided with a city sanitation truck that ran a stop sign. Howell had been with the station for less than a year.

In June 1981, due to a poor showing in the May ratings book, the station dropped Nightline and replaced it with reruns of All in the Family. General manager Bill Service noted that the reruns ABC had previously been programming in the timeslot fared better locally than Nightline was. The station received over 75 phone calls and 25 letters from viewers expressing displeasure with the move. Nightline was restored to the schedule on August 17, at a new, later midnight timeslot, with the All in the Family reruns remaining in the same timeslot to "please both audiences", according to Service.

The station underwent a $2 million renovation starting in 1985 that doubled the existing office space and created all-new technical facilities. The expanded facilities were dedicated in April 1986.

==== Averted loss of ABC affiliation ====
On several occasions throughout its history, the ABC network has studied the possibility of moving its affiliation away from WTVQ, even going so far as to enter into discussions with rival stations about relocating its programming there. The first attempt came in the late 1970s, when ABC had become the top-rated television network in the United States. Due to its rising fortunes, the network began to look for stronger affiliates across the country. Lexington was no exception, and in December 1978, The Lexington Herald reported that ABC had held talks with WKYT about that station potentially returning to ABC after ten years. Nothing ever materialized from those discussions, and WKYT renewed its affiliation with CBS, with WTVQ continuing as Lexington's ABC affiliate. WTVQ had been Lexington's third-rated station since its sign-on and was noted for having marginal production values around this time.

In August 1982, top ABC executives visited with WKYT once again, talking with that station's general manager about ending their affiliation with CBS and rejoining ABC. With WKYT turning them down, ABC then turned its sights to WLEX-TV about the possibility of them leaving NBC to join ABC. Nothing ever came of that either, with WLEX's general manager going so far as to say that his station "hasn't been offered a contract with ABC".

We have some concerns about WTVQ's performance in the market. We'll just leave it at that.

— George Newi, ABC senior vice president for affiliate relations

The closest WTVQ came to losing its affiliation came in late 1988, when upstart Fox affiliate WDKY-TV (channel 56), on air since 1986, approached ABC about becoming the new Lexington affiliate. ABC went as far as to hear formal presentations from it and WLKT on why the network should move to their station. An optimistic K. David Godbout, WDKY general manager, said "We're doing everything we can to get the affiliation. We're pulling out all the stops." For his station's part, WTVQ acting general manager Jerry Fox seemed to shrug off WDKY's ploy, saying that he did not "blame them" and adding that if his station was an independent he would "do whatever I could to survive". When asked why ABC was considering leaving channel 36, George Newi, ABC's senior vice president for affiliate relations matter-of-factly said that "We have some concerns about WTVQ's performance in the market. We'll just leave it at that." The network was also concerned at the amount of programming WTVQ was regularly preempting.

After much deliberation, in January 1989, ABC ultimately agreed to retain WTVQ as its Lexington affiliate. In exchange for keeping the network's programs on its air, WTVQ pledged to improve its newscasts, preempt less of the network's programming, and increase its promotion of network shows. Additionally, ABC would no longer pay the station to air its programming, in one of the earliest cases of a network moving away from the longstanding practice of paying its local affiliates to air its programming on an annual basis. Newi added that all parties "agreed that everything that has happened in the past is in the past".

==== Sale to Park; subsequent merger with Media General ====
On January 30, 1992, Park Communications purchased WTVQ from Shamrock Broadcasting. The $11 million purchase came after the improvements under Shamrock, particularly in the area of news, had pushed the station into a position of second-place contention and improved its reputation. Countering Park's noted image for frugality, Park invested in new equipment for the station.

In July 1995, Park Communications was sold to Gary B. Knapp and Donald R. Tomlin Jr., under the name Park Acquisitions. Knapp was a Lexington securities dealer whose bid was backed by the Retirement Systems of Alabama pension fund. Media General purchased Park Acquisitions and its properties (including WTVQ) in January 1997. On February 26, 2002, it became central Kentucky's first commercial television station to broadcast a digital television signal on UHF channel 40.

In 2004, WTVQ, along with Media General ABC affiliates WJBF and WMBB, preempted an uncut Veterans Day broadcast of the 1998 movie Saving Private Ryan, citing uncertainty over whether the film's obscenities would cause FCC repercussions in light of new commission policy.

==== Morris Multimedia era; sale to Scripps ====
On October 29, 2007, Media General announced that it was exploring the sale of WTVQ and four other stations in order to help reduce debt. Media General announced on March 7, 2008, that it had reached an agreement to sell WTVQ to Morris Multimedia for $16.5 million; it was the largest acquisition in Morris's history. By the time of this acquisition, WTVQ had fallen to fourth place in Lexington, behind WDKY, in revenue.

In 2008, WTVQ launched a subchannel carrying MyNetworkTV, replacing the low-power WBLU-LP, whose poor signal hampered its reach; this became an acute issue when MyNetworkTV became the new broadcast home of WWE's Smackdown!. A 10 p.m. newscast was also aired for a time on the subchannel.

The E. W. Scripps Company, owner of WLEX-TV, announced it would purchase WTVQ-DT from Morris for $15.8 million on March 4, 2026; the sale was completed on August 1.

== Local programming ==
=== Newscasts ===
On WTVQ's early news quality and perception

WTVQ has long had a poor image in the community when it comes to news. When the station first came on the air as channel 62, the news was little more than a joke. It included a news anchor who walked into the newsroom and threw his hat onto a coat rack to begin the evening's newscast. Then there was the sportscaster with the handlebar mustache who knew very little about the major sports but could certainly tell us a lot about rugby.

— David Reed, The Lexington Herald television columnist, June 19, 1981

WTVQ's newscasts have held many identities over the years, in large part because of their traditional third-place ratings in the market. The Lexington Herald skewered the station in 1980, just before the move to channel 36, for a "seemingly weak commitment to thorough, accurate news coverage". The station's first weather map was a hand-me-down from Miami; nobody bothered to remove the "low tide" and "high tide" markings from it despite their lack of utility in Kentucky. An attempt to bolster the newscasts by hiring former radio reporter Bill Evenson in the late 1970s was marred by sensationalism: one newscast opened with the phrase, "Kentucky, there's blood on your highways tonight." At that time, the newsroom was wracked by major turnover in personnel. This was also noticeable at the news director position. The station fired its news director in April 1981, only to do so again in January 1982. It offered the least early evening news of the Lexington stations, and its news staff of 22 compared unfavorably to the 35 and 40 of its competitors.

In 1986, WTVQ revamped its local newscasts, expanding its early evening news to an hour and updating its presentation. The changes failed to move the ratings needle in the first survey. However, after poaching lead male anchor John Lindgren from WKYT, an upturn finally began. It began to contend with WLEX for second place, and improvement in news ratings and perception also aided the station's bottom line, as news represented nearly 40 percent of its gross revenue. It maintained that position for much of the decade, but ratings declined as Lindgren took extended off-air absences to treat colon cancer; he died in January 2001 at the age of 55.

In the 2000s and 2010s, the station fell back to a distant third place in local news ratings. Morris dropped the station's 5 p.m. newscast shortly after taking over in order to air the syndicated show Judge Judy in hopes of increasing ratings and concentrating news resources elsewhere.

=== Non-news ===
In 1976, WTVQ began producing Happy's Hour, a weekday afternoon children's show that was the last of its kind to air on Lexington television. The show's host, Happy the Clown, was portrayed by staff announcer Tim Eppenstein. He was joined by his sidekick Froggy, a frog puppet portrayed by an unidentified puppeteer. Unlike most local children's shows, Happy's Hour did not feature a studio audience with area children. The show proved to be a smash success that led to merchandise sales (including T-shirts, bumper stickers, and even the show's theme song on record) and several guest appearances at community events. Due to shifting economics and program philosophies in the local television industry at the time, as well as an ownership change, Happy's Hour quietly faded away in 1979.

On February 17, 2020, the station debuted the afternoon talk show The Lee and Hayley Show, featuring former WLEX-TV personalities Lee Cruse and Hayley Harmon. The duo had exited the local NBC affiliate the previous year. Cruse and Harmon produced the show through their own company, with production services provided by WTVQ. By 2021, the program was airing in Bowling Green on WBKO–Fox and on four additional Morris-owned stations.

=== Notable former on-air staff ===
- Kenny Rice – sports director, later of NBC Sports

== Technical information ==
=== Subchannels ===
WTVQ's transmitter facility is located at the site of its former studios on the outer loop of Man o' War Boulevard (KY 1425) in the Brighton section of Fayette County. The station's signal is multiplexed:

Subchannels of WTVQ-DT
Subchannel	Res.	Short name	Programming
36.1	720p	WTVQ-TV	ABC
36.2	720p	myKY	Independent with MyNetworkTV
36.3	480i	TrueCrm	True Crime Network
36.4	480i	MeToons	MeTV Toons
36.5	480i	ion/Mys	Ion Mystery
36.6	480i	QuestTV	Quest
36.7	480i	HSN2	HSN2
36.8	480i	Catchy	Catchy Comedy

=== Analog-to-digital conversion ===
WTVQ-TV was the first station in Lexington to broadcast a digital signal in 2002. The station shut down its analog signal over UHF channel 36, on February 17, 2009, the original target date on which full-power television stations in the United States were to transition from analog to digital broadcasts under federal mandate (which was later pushed back to June 12, 2009). The station's digital signal remained on its pre-transition UHF channel 40, using virtual channel 36.

=== TV spectrum repack ===
In the wake of the repacking of television stations out of the 600 MHz band, including channels 38 to 51, WTVQ's digital signal moved from channel 40 to channel 27 in 2019.

Preceded by none	Channel 62 Lexington occupant 1968–1980	Succeeded by WLKT
