= WBLU =

WBLU may refer to:

- WBLU-FM, a radio station (88.9 FM) licensed to serve Grand Rapids, Michigan, United States
- WBLU-LP, a defunct low-power television station (channel 62) formerly licensed to serve Lexington, Kentucky, United States
