= Locker Room (talk show) =

- Starring: Larry McCarren (1988-2012); Burke Griffin (2012-present); Ahman Green (2012-present); Green Bay Packers Players
- Country of origin: United States

Production
- Running time: 30 min.

Original release
- Network: WFRV-TV
- Release: 1988 – present

"Locker Room" (formerly "Larry McCarren's Locker Room") is a live talk show hosted by WFRV-TV sports director Burke Griffin and former Green Bay Packer Ahman Green. The program was previously hosted by WFRV sports director and former Green Bay Packer Larry McCarren, who is now an analyst with the Green Bay Packers. Every week during football season, a Packers player is interviewed. During the interview,e they must teach one selected member of the audience how to do a task to earn their autograph in a segment called "Earn Your Autograph." Also, there is a segment on the show called "Chalk Talk," where certain plays are selected in the previous Packer game and are talked through.

== Band ==
The official band of "Locker Room" is 3rd and Short.

== 2012 hiatus ==
In March 2012, Larry McCarren announced that he was resigning from his 24-year position at WFRV-TV. He proceeded to join WGBA-TV in July 2012, launching the similar show Packers Live in September 2013 over the stations in the Packers' television network (McCarren did not do a show in the 2012 season due to a non-compete clause in the Green Bay market). In August 2012, WFRV announced it had found two new co-hosts for McCarren's former show, Burke Griffin and Ahman Green; the new show premiered on September 10.
