= WEOW =

Radio station in Key West, Florida

Coordinates: 24.677°N 81.511°W

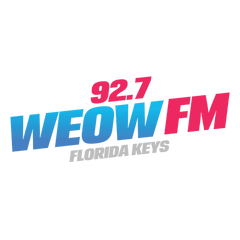
- Key West, Florida; United States
- Broadcast area: Florida Keys and parts of Cuba
- Frequency: 92.7 MHz
- Branding: 92.7 WEOW FM

Programming
- Format: Top 40 (CHR)

Ownership
- Owner: Joseph Fiorini; (Fiorini Keys Media, LLC)
- Sister stations: WAIL, WCTH, WFKZ, WAVK, WCNK, WWUS

History
- First air date: February 20, 1967; 59 years ago
- Former call signs: WFYN-FM (1967–1986)
- Call sign meaning: pronounced as wow

Technical information
- Licensing authority: FCC
- Facility ID: 11194
- Class: C1
- ERP: 100,000 watts
- HAAT: 168 meters (551 ft)

Links
- Public license information: Public file; LMS
- Webcast: WEOW 92.7 (iHeartRadio); Listen Live
- Website: www.weow927.com

WEOW (92.7 FM) is a commercial radio station broadcasting a Top 40 (CHR) format branded as "WEOW 92.7" (pronounced as "wow"). The station is currently owned by licensee Fiorini Keys Media, LLC, and is the southernmost Top 40 (CHR) station in the continental United States. Its 100,000-watt signal covers an area from Key Largo, Florida, to Havana, Cuba. Despite its logo's font and style being almost identical to the one used by former owner iHeartMedia for its KISS-FM branded stations (and other stations owned by the company), the station currently has no connection to them.

== History ==
=== Early history ===
Originally WFYN-FM, this was the Florida Keys' first FM radio station when Gayle Swofford's Florida Keys Broadcasting Corporation (together with sister station WKIZ 1500 AM) began airing on February 20, 1967 at 92.5 FM with a Beautiful Music format. In 1982 the format was updated to Adult Contemporary and in the mid-80s the call sign was changed to WEOW and the station became known as "WOW 92.5".

=== WEOW 92.5/92.7 ===
In 1990, WEOW dropped its Adult Contemporary format for Top 40 (CHR) but retained the "Wow 92.5" branding. During this time, the station featured popular personalities such as Paul Joffe, Chris Wolfe & JR in the Morning and Bill Bravo, who remains to this day. In the early 2000s, Clear Channel Communications purchased WEOW and ended up moving the station up the dial to 92.7.

On January 25, 2008, it was announced that WEOW was one of several Clear Channel radio stations to be sold, in order to remain under the ownership caps following the sale of Clear Channel to private investors. The station, along with its sister stations, was put into the Aloha Stations Trust until November 2013 when they were purchased by newly formed Florida Keys Media. The sale was finalized on February 28, 2014 at a price of $650,000, and WEOW began restructuring its on-air lineup, dropping all of Clear Channel's Premium Choice jocks for live and local talent. WEOW continues to be "powered by iHeartRadio" even after Clear Channel sold the station.

On April 1, 2014, WEOW brought back station vets Rude Girl & Molly Blue for mornings.

In July 2024 the station was sold to Fiorini Keys Media, LLC, keeping the current line up in place.
