= WTVO =

Television station in Rockford, Illinois

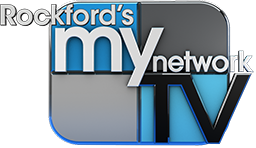
- Rockford, Illinois; United States
- Channels: Digital: 16 (UHF); Virtual: 17
- Branding: WTVO 17; Eyewitness News; Rockford's MyNetworkTV (17.2)

Programming
- Affiliations: 17.1: ABC; 17.2: Independent with MyNetworkTV; for others, see § Subchannels

Ownership
- Owner: Mission Broadcasting, Inc.
- Operator: Nexstar Media Group
- Sister stations: WQRF-TV

History
- First air date: May 3, 1953
- Former channel numbers: Analog: 39 (UHF, 1953–1967), 17 (UHF, 1967–2009)
- Former affiliations: NBC (1953–1995); DuMont (secondary, 1953–1956); ABC (secondary, 1953–1965)
- Call sign meaning: Winnebago (County) Television Organization

Technical information
- Licensing authority: FCC
- Facility ID: 72945
- ERP: 196 kW
- HAAT: 201 m (659 ft)
- Transmitter coordinates: 42°17′14″N 89°10′15″W

Links
- Public license information: Public file; LMS
- Website: www.mystateline.com

WTVO (channel 17) is a television station in Rockford, Illinois, United States, affiliated with ABC. It is owned by Mission Broadcasting and operated Nexstar Media Group alongside Fox affiliate WQRF-TV (channel 39). The two stations share studios on North Meridian Road in Rockford, where WTVO's transmitter is also located.

== History ==
The station signed on May 3, 1953, as the market's first television outlet and is the oldest continuously operating UHF station in the northern portion of Illinois. It originally aired an analog signal on UHF channel 39 but moved to channel 17 in 1967. WQRF has operated from channel 39 since first signed on in November 1978. WTVO was originally a primary NBC affiliate and shared secondary ABC status with WREX-TV (channel 13).

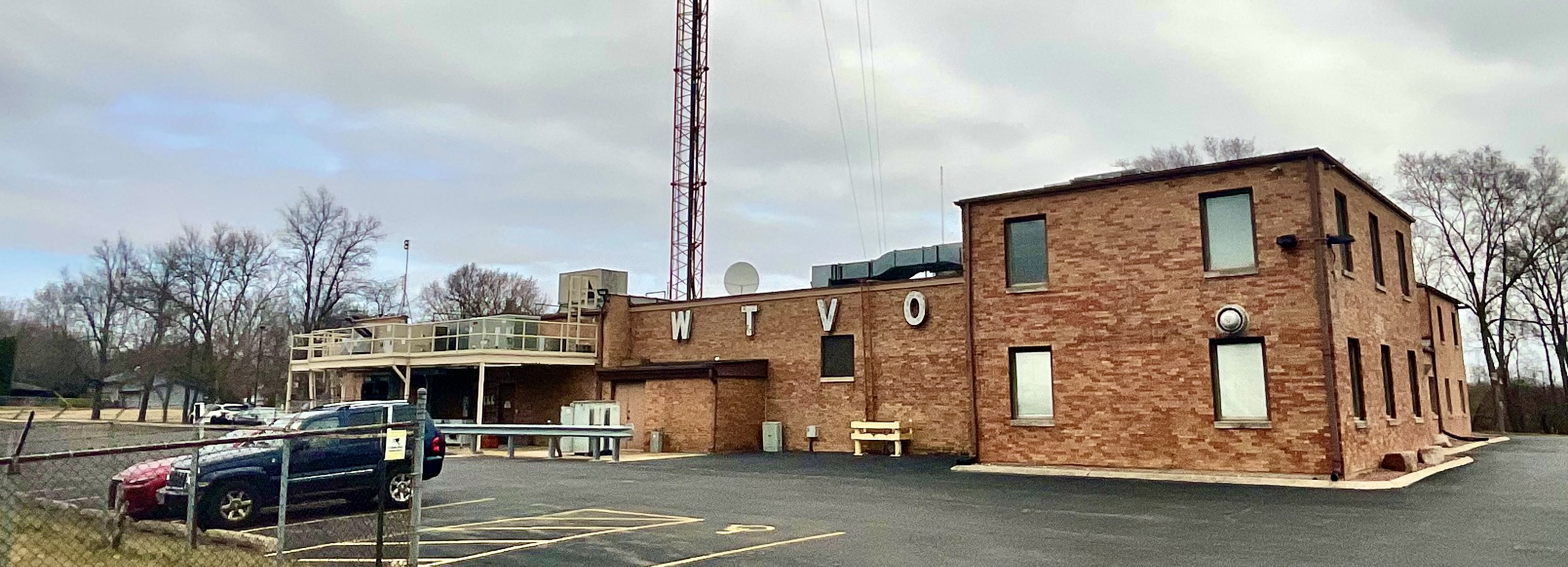
WTVO's studio facility on North Meridian Road west of Rockford, which has also been the home of WQRF-TV since 2005.

When WCEE-TV (channel 23, now WIFR) signed on in 1965, it took the CBS affiliation, sending ABC to WREX and leaving WTVO with just NBC. The station was owned by Winnebago Television (the station's call sign stands for "Winnebago Television Organization"), which was partially owned by the H & E Balaban Corporation (which later became Balaban Stations), until 1988 when Young Broadcasting of New York State purchased it. After a 42-year run as the local NBC station, it swapped network affiliations with WREX, taking the ABC affiliation on August 14, 1995. According to Variety, ABC pulled its programming from WREX not long after Quincy Newspapers bought the station. ABC was perturbed at Quincy's decision to switch the affiliation of its South Bend station WSJV from ABC to Fox earlier that year. The replacement ABC affiliate for South Bend, W58BT (now WBND-LD), began broadcasting on October 18, two months after WTVO affiliated with ABC. The deal may also have been facilitated by the fact that ABC had bought a minority stake in Young the year before.

Another ownership change came on November 22, 2004, when Mission Broadcasting (a de facto subsidiary of Irving, Texas–based Nexstar Broadcasting) bought WTVO from Young for $21 million. This made the station a sister to Nexstar-owned WQRF. Although WQRF was nominally the senior partner of the agreement, the combined operation was based at WTVO's studio, and WTVO produces programming for WQRF. The same was completed in January 2005. Shortly before the sale was completed, WTVO was one of the Young-owned stations that preempted an uninterrupted Veterans Day broadcast of the 1998 movie Saving Private Ryan.

For a number of years, WTVO carried selected Chicago Cubs telecasts originating from WGN-TV. However, in 1988, those telecasts moved to WIFR. During its days as an NBC affiliate, WTVO preempted a good number of network shows, particularly in weekday and Saturday daytime. It also preempted the Saturday edition of the NBC Nightly News in the 1980s.

A significant figure in its history was news anchor Bruce Richardson. He spent over 35 years at the station from 1956 until his retirement in June 1992, longer than any anchorman in the history of Rockford television. Harold Froelich, one of WTVO's founders, served as general manager for 37 years from sign-on until his retirement in 1990. In 1953, Froelich was one of the youngest general managers in television.

In November 2016, WTVO's ratings rose to first place in its 5 p.m., 6 p.m. and 10 p.m. newscasts according to comScore, its success featured in the online television trade publication TVNewsCheck in an article entitled, "From 3rd to 1st, How WTVO Became News Leader".

== Newscasts ==
In March 2006, WTVO began producing the market's second prime time newscast on WQRF known as Fox 39 News at 9. The broadcast only aired on weeknights unlike the area's original prime time show that was seen every night on cable-only WB affiliate "WBR" (produced by WREX). This distinction made WQRF's news Rockford's first over-the-air newscast at 9. Competition between "WBR" and WQRF was short-lived because, in late 2007, the former had its news canceled by WREX for an unknown reason. The time slot is currently used to replay the NBC outlet's weeknight 6 o'clock show on what is now CW affiliate WREX-DT2.

Another addition to local newscasts on WQRF occurred January 14, 2008, when WTVO launched Fox 39 Evening News at 6:30. Eventually, WQRF expanded Fox 39 News at 9 to a seven-night operation and lengthened the weeknight version to a full hour. That station would eventually drop the 6:30 show for an unknown reason.

WQRF's weeknight prime time newscast maintains a separate news anchor but features the same meteorologist and sports anchor as seen WTVO. On March 5, 2012, WTVO launched a two-hour-long extension of its weekday morning show on WQRF. Known as Fox 39 More Local in the Morning, this can be seen from 7 until 9 offering a local alternative to the national morning programs that air on the area's big three outlets.

WIFR was the first television station in Rockford to upgrade its newscasts to high definition followed by WREX on December 12, 2010. On December 18, 2012, WTVO and WQRF debuted a brand new set, news music package, and graphics scheme that is based on the Eyewitness News branding seen on other Nexstar/Mission television stations. Unlike most ABC affiliates, this outlet does not air a midday newscast during the week. As part of its schedule, MyNetworkTV affiliate WTVO-DT2 offers repeats of local news from the main channel.

On April 24, 2013, WTVO and WQRF moved to high definition, becoming the last television stations in Rockford to do so. Ben Hutchison, Matt Rodewald, and Chief Meteorologist Candice King anchored the final standard definition news broadcast in Rockford history.

In June 2013, WTVO became the first station in the Rockford market to air a Spanish-language newscast hosted by anchor/reporter Alma Valenzuela and airing on channel 17.2. It began as a 15-minute newscast and was then expanded to a half-hour. The newscast was discontinued in 2017 due to low ratings.

== Technical information ==
=== Subchannels ===
The station's signal is multiplexed:

Subchannels of WTVO
Subchannel	Res.	Short name	Programming
17.1	720p	WTVO-DT	ABC
17.2	720p	My Net	Independent with MyNetworkTV
17.3	480i	Laff	Laff
17.4	480i	Grit	Grit

WTVO's secondary programming service launched on September 22, 2003, carrying UPN. Branded as "Rockford UPN 16", WTVO-DT2 replaced WHPN (now WIFS) in Madison, Wisconsin, on Rockford area cable systems.

Access to UPN was actually lost a year earlier in 2002 after a change in WHPN’s ownership prompted an affiliation switch to The WB. That station's new owner, Acme Communications, was a major station group involved in The WB. Since UPN moved to a similar secondary programming service in Madison (known as "UPN 14"), Rockford cable systems imported Chicago's WPWR-TV (now a MyNetworkTV owned-and-operated station) into the market as the de facto UPN affiliate for Rockford until WTVO added "Rockford UPN 16". In September 2006 with the merger of UPN and The WB, WTVO-DT2 joined the other new network debuting at the time (MyNetworkTV) which is actually a sister operation to Fox that is seen on WQRF.

As of November 2014, MyNetworkTV-affiliated WTVO-DT2 channel 17.2 began broadcasting in high definition, utilizing the programming service's standard 720p format.

=== Analog-to-digital conversion ===
WTVO shut down its analog signal, over UHF channel 17, on February 17, 2009, the original target date on which full-power television stations in the United States were to transition from analog to digital broadcasts under federal mandate (which was later pushed back to June 12, 2009). The station's digital signal remained on its pre-transition UHF channel 16, using virtual channel 17.
