= WAVK =

- Marathon, Florida; United States
- Broadcast area: Florida Keys area
- Frequency: 97.7 MHz
- Branding: 97.7 The Zone

Programming
- Format: Sports
- Affiliations: Infinity Sports Network; Fox Sports Radio; Miami Dolphins; Miami Heat; Miami Hurricanes; Miami Marlins

Ownership
- Owner: Joseph Fiorini; (Fiorini Keys Media, LLC)
- Sister stations: WAIL, WCTH, WFKZ, WEOW, WCNK, WWUS

History
- First air date: March 3, 1995 (as WDUC)
- Former call signs: WDUC (1995–1995); WKTS (1995–1999); WWWK (1999–2003)
- Call sign meaning: "Wave" (former branding)

Technical information
- Licensing authority: FCC
- Facility ID: 23294
- Class: C1
- ERP: 100,000 watts
- HAAT: 168 meters
- Transmitter coordinates: 24°39′38.40″N 81°25′9.70″W

Links
- Public license information: Public file; LMS
- Webcast: Listen Live (via TuneIn); Listen Live via iHeart
- Website: thezone977.com

WAVK (97.7 FM) is a radio station temporarily broadcasting a sports radio format. Licensed to Marathon, Florida, USA, the station serves the Florida Keys. The station is currently owned by licensee Fiorini Keys Media, LLC, and features programming from Infinity Sports Network and Fox Sports Radio.

== History ==
The station went on the air as WDUC on March 3, 1995. On November 3, 1995, the station changed its call sign to WKTS; on September 9, 1999, to WWWK; and on October 23, 2003, to the current WAVK. The first real format of WWWK was pure dance music as "K97", before flipping to hot AC "Wave".

In August 2013, Gamma Broadcasting, LLC reached a deal to sell its Florida Keys stations (including WAVK) to Florida Keys Media, LLC (a company controlled by Robert H. Holladay). At a price of $475,000, the sale of WAVK was consummated on July 1, 2014.

In July 2024, the station was sold to Fiorini Keys Media, LLC.

On March 30, 2020, WAVK temporarily dropped its Hot AC format for Sports as 97.7 The Zone. The reason being that sister station 1600 AM WKWF is having repairs done to its transmitter and it can no longer broadcast for the time being so its format as temporarily moved here.
