= WBLU-LP =

Television station in Lexington, Kentucky (1998–2009)

- Lexington, Kentucky; United States
- Channels: Analog: 62 (UHF)

Programming
- Affiliations: UPN (1998–2004); The WB (secondary, 1999–2003); Shop at Home Network (1999–2000?); Independent (2004–2006); MyNetworkTV (2006–July 2008; October 1–31, 2008); RTN (2006–July 2008; October 1, 2008–January 2009); Silent (July–October 1, 2008); Retro Jams (January–March 2009)

Ownership
- Owner: Daystar Television Network; (Word of God Fellowship, Inc.)

History
- Founded: October 24, 1994
- First air date: November 2, 1998
- Last air date: March 4, 2009
- Former call signs: W62CL (1998–2001)
- Call sign meaning: Bluegrass

Technical information
- Licensing authority: FCC
- Facility ID: 58985
- Class: TX
- ERP: 4 kW
- HAAT: 156 m (512 ft)
- Transmitter coordinates: 38°2′51″N 84°29′57.03″W

Links
- Public license information: LMS

WBLU-LP (channel 62) was a low-power television station in Lexington, Kentucky, United States. Owned by Equity Media Holdings, the station broadcast its signal from downtown Lexington and provided coverage that did not extend far past the developed portions of the city, although the signal could be picked up in neighboring Scott and Bourbon counties. The station was active from 1999 until 2009, when it went dark due to a wide-ranging bankruptcy involving Equity.

== History ==
=== Previous use of frequency in market ===
The channel 62 frequency was originally used by ABC affiliate WBLG-TV (later re-called as WTVQ-TV) from 1968 until 1980, when that station relocated to channel 36.

After WTVQ moved to channel 36, several organizations began to petition to re-use the frequency in hope of making it the fourth television station broadcasting out of Lexington (aside from KET). Way of the Cross, Inc., which wanted to use it for Christian broadcasting, was initially awarded the license, but, in 1983, channel 62 was awarded to Family Broadcasting Co., Inc., a for-profit group, due to their ability to build a stronger transmitter, which would carry the signal further into Eastern Kentucky. In 1986, a settlement between Way of the Cross and FBC was reached, which would allow Way of the Cross to broadcast 15 hours of religious programming each week, plus part-ownership of the station, while FBC would construct the station.

However, WDKY-TV (channel 56), licensed to Danville, found a less arduous path to come to air. It launched in February 1986 and several months later became a charter affiliate of the new Fox network and located their studios in Lexington, effectively muting any impact channel 62 could make; it remained silent into 1987 and most of 1988.

Finally, after more than seven years of legal battles, the station, called as WLKT-TV, went on the air on October 15, 1988, under FBC's ownership, giving Lexington two independent stations. The studio and offices were located in a small shopping center at 124 New Circle Road, Northeast. The transmitter was located on Clintonville Road, three miles (5 km) north of US 60, in Clark County.

It made little to no impact in Lexington, quickly losing money and unable to compete in any way with WDKY, and was stunted by the Family Broadcasting settlement deeming they controlled fifteen hours of the station's schedule weekly, devoted to religious programming. The signal also was limited to the core Lexington area. WLKT ceased operations at 4:30 p.m. on June 30, 1989.

=== WBLU-LP ===
==== UPN and WB affiliations ====
Channel 62 returned to the air on November 2, 1998, when B&C Communications first signed on WBLU, serving as a low-power translator station of WAOM (channel 67), which was licensed to Morehead, but mainly served the eastern portion of the market; WBLU thus provided the main signal source for WAOM in Lexington. The station was a UPN affiliate, airing infomercials and syndicated reruns outside of the network's hours.

In September 1999, WAOM/WBLU added The WB as a secondary affiliation. The station aired WB programs off-schedule, weeknights at 10 p.m. and on weekends. Though the actual airtime of programs promoted by the network could have easily been inserted via a voiceover or on-screen notation (as some dual-network affiliates carrying The WB out of pattern such as WZPX-TV in Battle Creek, Michigan, did), the station instead crudely removed the promos wholesale while running the network's programming. In 2001, WAOM was sold to Paxson Communications, which converted it to their Pax TV network (under new callsign WUPX-TV). Paxson determined that they would depend mainly on cable carriage to cover Lexington and did not purchase WBLU-LP. This effectively left the former translator station alone as a WB/UPN affiliate with a small signal range confined only to Lexington proper. The WB affiliation ended in September 2003, after Campbellsville-licensed WBKI-TV became the WB affiliate for the Lexington market upon moving their transmitter to be equidistant between Louisville and Lexington.

==== Period of independence and beginning of struggles ====
In September 2004, WBLU lost its UPN affiliation when WKYT-TV established its second digital subchannel, "UKYT" (now "CWKYT"). WBLU then became an independent station which struggled to maintain programming for the next two years. Timeslots outside of syndication were filled with paid programming and public domain movies, some of which were acquired only minutes before airtime from the "dollar DVD" section of a nearby Walmart.

==== MyNetworkTV affiliation ====
WBLU was purchased by Equity Broadcasting in August 2006, which began to centralcast the station from their headquarters in Little Rock, Arkansas, ending any local staffing of the station at the end of 2006. On September 5, 2006, the station became a charter affiliate of MyNetworkTV without any consideration of becoming part of The CW, as Equity refused to affiliate any of their stations with that network. Equity also added programming from the Retro Television Network (which it owned at that time) to fill out the remainder of the broadcast day, discontinuing any other syndicated programming.

WBLU-LP went dark on or about July 22, 2008, due to what Equity described as "intermittent signal delivery issues" via satellite from Little Rock. The station reportedly resumed broadcasting on October 1, 2008. WBLU-LP did have a construction permit to move to digital operations, but for most of their stations, Equity never even made any serious attempt to build a digital facility out due to liquidity issues, and many of their full-power stations went dark after the digital transition on June 12, 2009, due to a lack of any digital facility to transition to. In contrast, WBLU-LP, as a low-power station, would have been able to remain on the air in analog until July 13, 2021, at the latest (the transition date for low-power stations), were it to have completed a move to the new UHF television band below channel 51. All UHF channels between 52 and 69 had been auctioned off before the transition to extend GSM mobile phone frequencies.

Equity had filed a construction permit before the auction to boost WBLU-LP's effective radiated power of 4 kW to 42 kW on channel 62, which would have increased the viewing area into the neighboring cities that touch Lexington. The signal upgrade never took place as the digital transition removing channel 62 from the UHF bandplan made the construction permit unbuildable, and it was regarded as a time-wasting move on Equity's part to merely preserve the license.

==== Decline and end of operations ====
The station lost its MyNetworkTV affiliation on October 31, 2008, due to both dissatisfaction by the network and viewer complaints about the loss of WWE Friday Night Smackdown from WKYT-DT2 after its move to MyNetworkTV; unlike that CW affiliate, WBLU-LP was never carried on any local pay television services, nor had Equity communicated in any way with local providers to add the station (this was despite most of Equity's stations, including WBLU-LP, being freely available through C-band satellite, negating any need to depend on WBLU-LP's transmitter for a quality signal). Communication between local media, MyNetworkTV and Equity (which was infamous for having little to no presence of any local non-engineering staff for their stations, running almost all operations remotely from Little Rock) was non-existent to the point that the market's professional wrestling fans placed paid advertising in the Lexington Herald-Leader expressing their frustration, forcing the hand of MyNetworkTV to affiliate on a station viewable both over-the-air and on cable in a critical WWE market. Smackdown then moved immediately to the second subchannel of WTVQ-TV, replacing an automated weather information stream, with the subchannel becoming a full-time network affiliate on New Year's Day 2009.

The secondary RTN affiliation then became primary for WBLU-LP, but was unexpectedly terminated on January 4, 2009, after a contract conflict between Equity and Luken Communications (who had acquired RTN in June 2008) came abruptly to a head with Equity terminating the RTV signal from their base in Little Rock; this resulted in Luken dropping all Equity-owned affiliates, including WBLU. Though Luken promised to find a new affiliate for the network immediately, it has never returned to the Lexington market.

For two months, the station carried a loop of Equity's last-resort network Retro Jams, which carried music videos, but without any network to affiliate with or local advertising revenue coming in, the future of the station as a going concern quickly declined. WBLU-LP ended up going dark permanently on March 4, 2009, five months after the loss of MyNetworkTV.

WBLU was sold at auction to the Daystar Television Network on April 16, 2009, in bulk with several other Equity stations. However, Daystar was already carried on most cable systems in the Lexington market. Daystar (known for preferring fully-automated stations themselves without a local staff or studio) audited the station's prospects, and seeing the costs to resume the station's service were more than needed, including the likelihood of having to apply for another construction permit to move the station to a lower UHF channel and that it would accrue extra costs to do so, Daystar decided not to go further with re-launching the station. WBLU-LP never resumed broadcasting, and its license was canceled on June 25, 2010.

Preceded by WLKT-TV	Channel 62 Lexington occupant 1998–2009	Succeeded by none
