= WAIL =

- Key West, Florida; United States
- Broadcast area: Florida Keys area
- Frequency: 99.5 MHz
- Branding: WAIL 99.5

Programming
- Format: Classic rock

Ownership
- Owner: Joseph Fiorini; (Fiorini Keys Media, LLC)
- Sister stations: WEOW, WCTH, WFKZ, WAVK, WCNK, WWUS

History
- First air date: 1965
- Former call signs: "WVFK 95.5 FM"
- Call sign meaning: sounds like "whale"

Technical information
- Licensing authority: FCC
- Facility ID: 31637
- Class: C1
- ERP: 100,000 watts
- HAAT: 167 meters
- Transmitter coordinates: 24°39′32.00″N 81°32′18.00″W

Links
- Public license information: Public file; LMS
- Webcast: Listen Live
- Website: wail995.com

WAIL (99.5 FM) is a radio station broadcasting a classic rock format. Licensed to Key West, Florida, United States, the station serves the Florida Keys area. The station is currently owned by licensee Fiorini Keys Media, LLC.

== History ==
On January 25, 2008, it was announced that WAIL-FM was one of several Clear Channel radio stations to be sold, in order to remain under the ownership caps following the sale of Clear Channel to private investors. Until it was sold, WAIL and other stations to be sold were placed into the Aloha Stations Trust.

WAIL used to be known as "99.5 The Whale." WAIL simulcasted with WFKZ, and the two stations were formally known as "99.5/103.1 Sun FM."

The trust sold WAIL and three sister stations to Robert Holladay's Florida Keys Media, LLC for $650,000; the transaction was consummated on February 28, 2014.

In July 2024 the station was sold to Fiorini Keys Media, LLC

WAIL simulcasts on WFKZ during the Hoebee In The Afternoon Experiment, M-W 2–6, TH2-7 and Fri 2–6. They also air the same Saturday night programming, The Night Train With Joey Naples.
