= Larry McCarren =

American football player and sports broadcaster (born 1951)

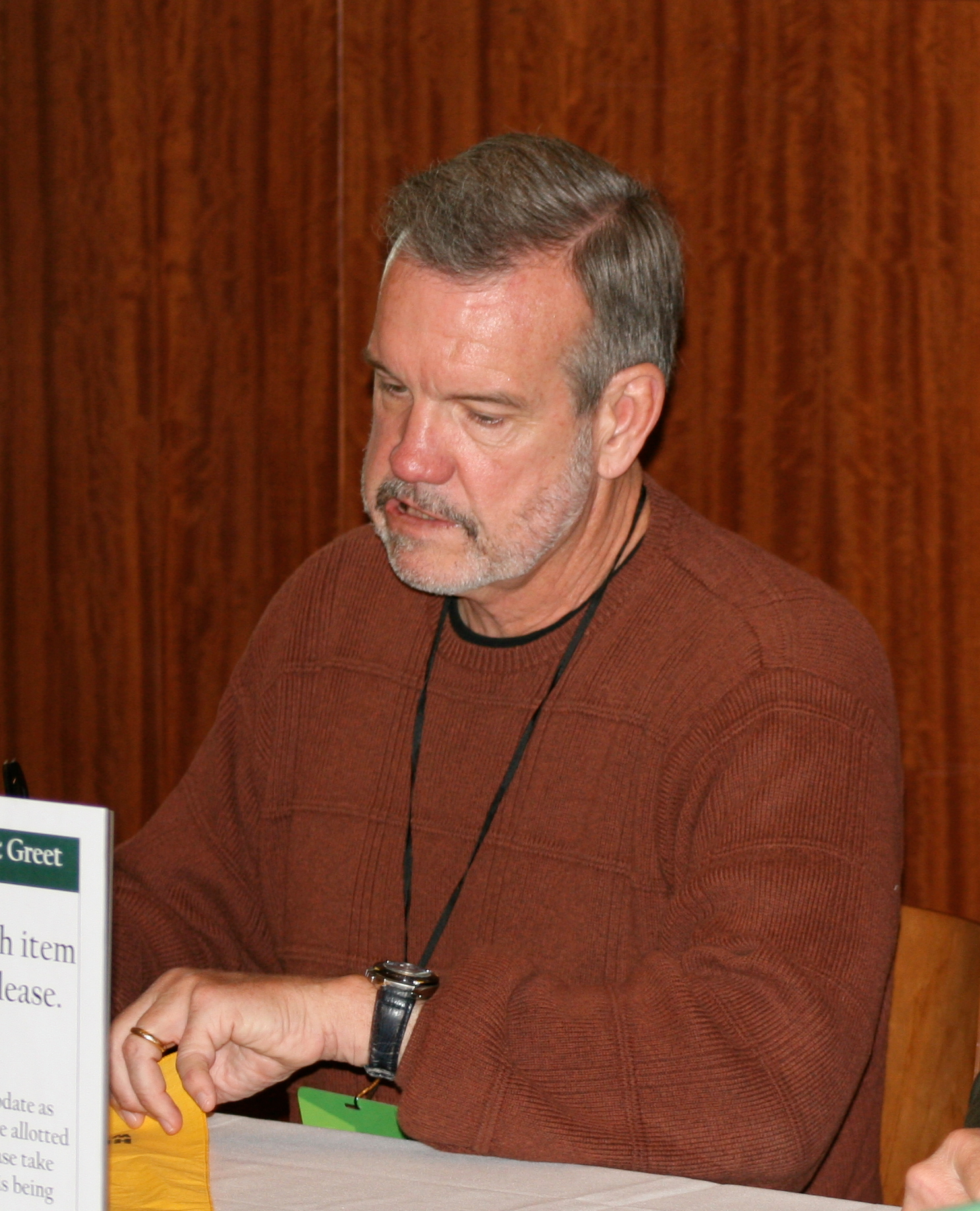
- McCarren signing autographs in 2007

No. 54
- Position: Center

Personal information
- Born: November 9, 1951 (age 74); Park Forest, Illinois, U.S.
- Listed height: 6 ft 3 in (1.91 m)
- Listed weight: 246 lb (112 kg)

Career information
- High school: Rich East (Park Forest)
- College: Illinois
- NFL draft: 1973: 12th round, 308th overall pick

Career history
- Green Bay Packers (1973–1984)

Awards and highlights
- Second-team All-Pro (1983); 2× Pro Bowl (1982, 1983); Green Bay Packers Hall of Fame; First-team All-Big Ten (1972)

Career NFL statistics
- Games played: 162
- Games started: 162
- Stats at Pro Football Reference

Laurence Anthony McCarren (born November 9, 1951) is an American sports broadcaster and former professional football player. He played as a center for 12 seasons in the National Football League (NFL) with the Green Bay Packers. McCarren had a long career as the Packers' starting center. He was named to the Pro Bowl in 1982 and 1983. After his playing career ended, he was inducted in the Green Bay Packers Hall of Fame.

He began a television and radio broadcasting career in 1988 at WFRV-TV and he was named the Wisconsin Sportscaster of the Year four times. McCarren has been working on the Packers Radio Network as the color commentator for the Packers' radio broadcasts since 1995.

== Playing career ==
During his time with the team, the Packers compiled an overall record of 71–99–5. He earned the nickname the "Rock" after he started 162 consecutive games, which is the team's fourth longest consecutive games start streak as of May 2008. He played in two NFL Pro Bowls in 1982 and 1983. He was inducted in the Green Bay Packers Hall of Fame in 1992.

== Broadcasting career ==
In 1988 McCarren became the main sports anchor and sports director of Green Bay's WFRV-TV (Channel 5), a position he held until March 2012, when the station announced he was departing. He hosted "Larry McCarren's Locker Room" during the NFL season, which included player interviews, highlights, and breakdowns of game film. McCarren began as a color commentator and game analyst on the "Packers Radio Network" with Jim Irwin and Max McGee in 1995, and has been teamed with play by play voice Wayne Larrivee on radio broadcasts since 1999. He was named the Wisconsin Sportscaster of the Year in 1994, 1996, 2002, and 2007 by the National Sportscasters and Sportswriters Association.

In July 2012, McCarren began to provide game and team analysis via the eastern Wisconsin stations of Journal Broadcast Group, including WTMJ-TV in Milwaukee and WGBA-TV in Green Bay, which currently are the official production and station/pre-season partners of the team; McCarren was already employed by Journal through the Packer Radio Network, which has its flagship at Milwaukee's WTMJ (AM). A Locker Room-type program returned for the 2013 NFL season on stations throughout the Packers state network, under the new title Packers Live and now being recorded in the Lambeau Field atrium rather than Locker Room filming from various local conference and banquet facilities through the year. On April 1, 2013, McCarren assumed sports director duties for WGBA as his WFRV non-compete clause expired.

McCarren announced on March 27, 2015 that this was his final day as WGBA sportscaster after being a local broadcaster for almost 30 years. "In my case, It's not time for retirement. It's time to focus all my energy on my passion, Packers football," McCarren told his audience on NBC26.

On April 9, 2015, the Green Bay Packers announced McCarren as a sports analyst for the Packers Media Group. In this role, he helps with the Packers' digital media. He continues to host Packers Live with Larry McCarren and Total Packers With Matt LaFleur which airs on WGBA-TV in Green Bay and WTMJ-TV in Milwaukee during football season. His main emphasis is his work alongside Wayne Larrivee broadcasting games on WTMJ-AM and the Packers Radio Network. McCarren was also elected to the Board of Directors of Green Bay Packers, Inc. in 2015 and served in that role until his mandatory retirement from the Board at age 70 in 2022.
