= WLKT (TV) =

Television station in Lexington, Kentucky (1988–1989)

Lexington, Kentucky; United States
- Channels: Analog: 62 (UHF)

Programming
- Affiliations: Independent

Ownership
- Owner: Family Group Broadcasting; (FBC, Inc.)

History
- First air date: October 15, 1988
- Last air date: June 30, 1989; (258 days)
- Call sign meaning: Lexington, Kentucky

Technical information
- Facility ID: 20399
- ERP: 2,333 kW
- HAAT: 325 m (1,067 ft)
- Transmitter coordinates: 38°03′29″N 84°23′51″W

WLKT (channel 62) was an independent television station in Lexington, Kentucky, United States. The station was owned by Family Broadcasting Company, Inc., a subsidiary of Family Group Broadcasting. WLKT-TV's transmitter was located in Clark County in an area near Winchester. This station was not and is not in any way related to WLKT-FM, a Mainstream Top 40 radio station in Lexington.

== History ==
The channel 62 allocation in Lexington was originally home to ABC affiliate WTVQ-TV. The station operated there from sign-on in 1968 as WBLU until 1980, when it relocated to channel 36 to address signal concerns in parts of central Kentucky. WTVQ's move left channel 62 open for assignment to a new television station. By 1982, four different groups had sought a construction permit for a new station on channel 62: Kentucky Educational Television, seeking to start a second service alongside flagship WKLE (channel 46); religious nonprofit Way of the Cross Outreach, Inc. (WOC); Family Broadcasting Corporation (FBC), which owned WFTS-TV in Tampa, Florida; and Lexington Family Television, Inc. Facing funding problems, KET dropped out before hearings began, followed by Lexington Family Television, which settled with Way of the Cross.

The initial decision of the Federal Communications Commission (FCC) in February 1983 favored Way of the Cross, but the commission's review board then awarded the construction permit to FBC in October, finding its proposal technically superior. Way of the Cross appealed. Litigation continued until June 1986, when the two groups reached a settlement in which Way of the Cross would acquire a minority stake in channel 62 and receive 15 hours of airtime a week for religious programming.

With the coast clear for FBC to build, however, attention shifted to finding a suitable tower site. Twice, FBC was denied by the Urban County Board of Adjustment in its bid to place the tower, and a third site on land deeded to the University of Kentucky was also controversial among local residents and denied. WLKT finally came to air on October 15, 1988, from a tower in Clark County and studios on New Circle Road Northeast. The protracted license fight had cost the station before it even started broadcasting: two years earlier, in 1986, Danville-licensed WDKY-TV (channel 56) had signed on the air as the first independent in the Lexington market.

The relationship with Way of the Cross did not last a month after sign-on before breaking down. The airtime agreement called for Way of the Cross to supply an hour of religious programming at 9 a.m. and midnight which would air on WLKT. On November 15, Way of the Cross sued FBC, claiming it had reneged on the airtime agreement. The station secretly bid on the ABC affiliation when the network considered leaving WTVQ, but ABC opted to stay with channel 36.

In June 1989, WLKT let go of three station executives, including general manager Arch Chapman, in what was described as little more than a cost-cutting move. Howard Trickey, an executive with Raymond James and Associates, which held a 49 percent interest in the station, took over as acting general manager and was charged with overseeing more cost-cutting measures. However, Trickey was unable to prevent WLKT from succumbing to its financial woes. Channel 62 suspended operations at 4:30 p.m. on the afternoon of June 30, following an episode of Alvin and the Chipmunks. The shutdown came after the station's bank refused to lend any more money; even before then, there had been concerns that the station wasn't getting necessary financial support. Staffers were told of the move just 20 minutes before it happened. Insufficient financial backing dominated the reasons for the station's folding; RJ Telecommunications, a division of Raymond James, was already looking for buyers for WLKT and two other Family Group-owned stations. RJ and Family Group had sued former Family Group managing general partner Ian Wheeler for fraud, claiming that he inflated projected revenues for the station despite knowing that Lexington was not large enough to support what were essentially two independent stations (WDKY-TV had joined Fox, but like most early Fox affiliates was mostly programmed as an independent) and had the company purchase equipment from his other stations at inflated prices.

On May 9, 1990, the station surrendered its license after FBC's owners were told there was little realistic chance of returning to the air. Nine days later, FBC filed for Chapter 7 bankruptcy, owing more than $1.3 million to a group of creditors headlined by program suppliers Viacom and Lorimar-Telepictures. Lexington's three major-network affiliates–WLEX-TV, WKYT-TV and WTVQ–were also among the creditors; they had done production work for FBC. The company claimed that the Way of the Cross lawsuit scared away potential buyers.

== See also ==
- WBLU-LP – third and final occupant of UHF channel 62 in the Lexington area

| Preceded by WTVQ | Channel 62 Lexington occupant 1988–1989 | Succeeded by WBLU-LP |
