= WLAX =

Television station in La Crosse, Wisconsin

WLAX and WEUX

WLAX: La Crosse, Wisconsin; WEUX: Chippewa Falls–Eau Claire, Wisconsin; United States
- Channels for WLAX: Digital: 33 (UHF); Virtual: 25
- Channels for WEUX: Digital: 21 (UHF); Virtual: 48
- Branding: Fox 25/48

Programming
- Affiliations: 25.1/48.1: Fox; for others, see § Technical information

Ownership
- Owner: Nexstar Media Group; (Nexstar Media Inc.)

History
- First air date: WLAX: November 10, 1986; WEUX: February 9, 1993
- Former call signs: WLAX: WWQI (CP, 1982–1985)
- Former channel number: WLAX: Analog: 25 (UHF, 1986–2009); Digital: 17 (UHF, 2004–2020); WEUX: Analog: 48 (UHF, 1993–2009); Digital: 49 (UHF, 2006–2019)
- Call sign meaning: WLAX: La Crosse, with "Crosse" represented as an X; WEUX: Eau Claire Fox

Technical information
- Licensing authority: FCC
- Facility ID: WLAX: 2710; WEUX: 2709
- ERP: WLAX: 1,000 kW; WEUX: 600 kW
- HAAT: WLAX: 295 m (968 ft); WEUX: 225.5 m (740 ft)
- Transmitter coordinates: WLAX: 43°48′16″N 91°22′19.8″W; WEUX: 44°57′24″N 91°40′4″W

Links
- Public license information: WLAX: Public file; LMS; WEUX: Public file; LMS
- Website: www.wiproud.com

WLAX (channel 25) in La Crosse, Wisconsin, and WEUX (channel 48) in Chippewa Falls, Wisconsin, are television stations serving as the Fox affiliates for western Wisconsin. They are owned by Nexstar Media Group.

WLAX serves the southern portion of the market, while WEUX operates as a full-time satellite for Eau Claire and the market's northern portion. WLAX maintains studio facilities at Interchange Place in La Crosse and a transmitter in La Crescent, Minnesota. WEUX has offices on WIS 93 in Eau Claire and a transmitter southeast of Colfax.

WLAX in La Crosse went on the air in November 1986, after two sales of the permit, as the original independent station in the market. It joined Fox shortly afterward. Family Group Broadcasting, which put the station on the air, attempted to build the Eau Claire station as a satellite of WLAX but fell into bankruptcy before it could do so. Aries Telecommunications of Green Bay bought WLAX and the WEUX construction permit in 1991 and was able to build out and sign on WEUX in 1993. Grant Broadcasting acquired the pair in 1996, and Nexstar acquired Grant's stations in 2014. The stations air a 9 p.m. local newscast produced by local NBC affiliate WEAU.

== History ==
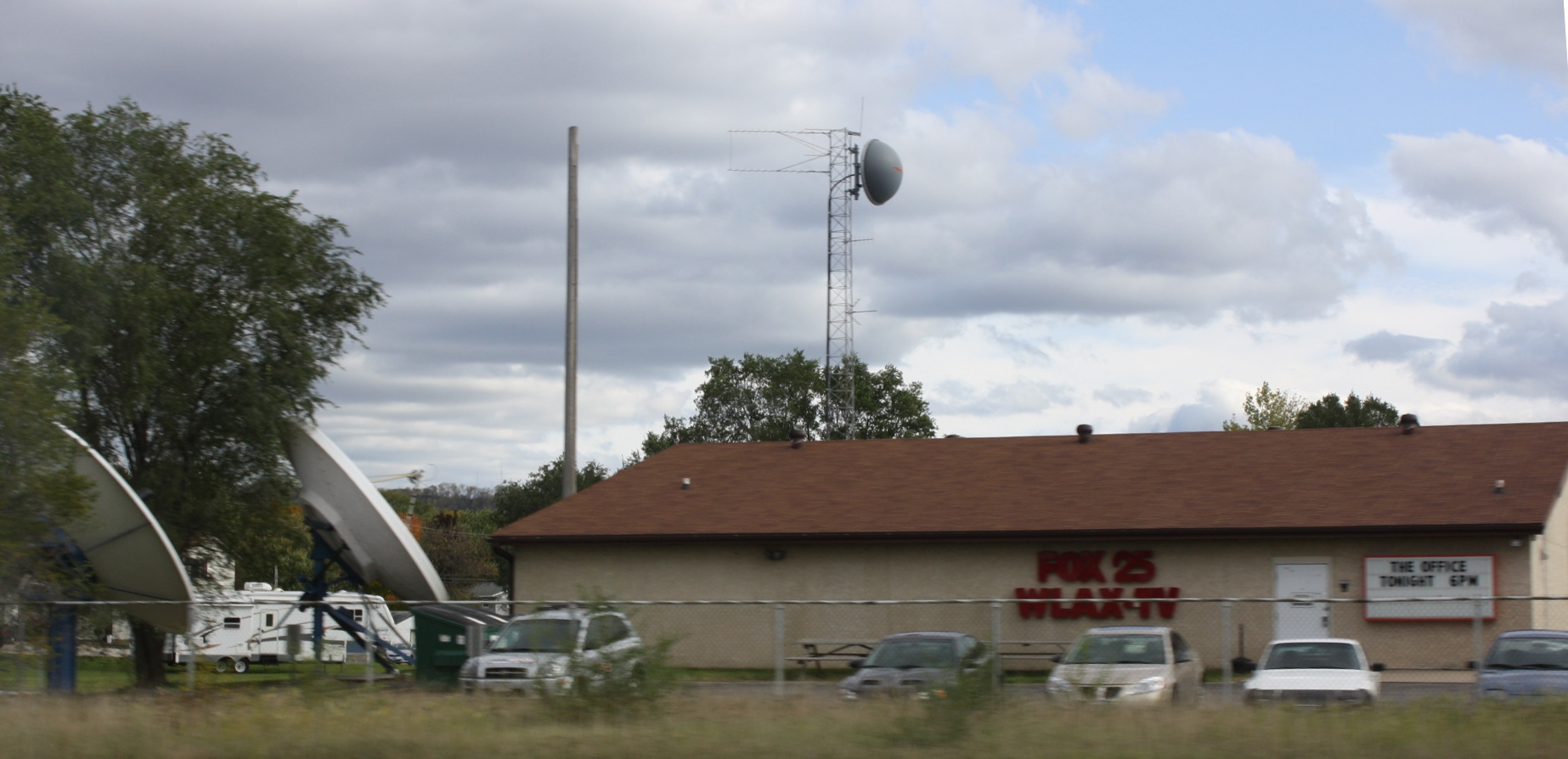
The WLAX studios in La Crosse

=== Construction of WLAX ===
Channel 25 had been assigned to La Crosse since 1966 and almost saw use in the late 1960s when two groups proposed to start a second station in the city after WKBT. Midcontinent Broadcasting Company was approved in December 1967 to build a satellite of its Madison station, WKOW-TV, in La Crosse. WKOW and La Crosse radio station WKTY had both applied for channel 19, causing WKOW to shift its application to channel 25 before WKTY withdrew after the WKOW-TV grant, citing its inability to obtain network affiliation given that the WKOW station would provide La Crosse with its first full-time ABC service. WKOW then sought to move its station, WXOW-TV, back to channel 19.

No party filed for channel 25 until 1980, when a group of local investors under the name Quarterview Inc. applied for channel 25. While some of the same investors built local radio station WISQ (100.1 FM), the construction permit was granted in 1982. Quarterview did not build the station. It sold the permit in 1984 to TV-26 Inc., owner of WLRE-TV in Green Bay. That station then filed for bankruptcy reorganization and was purchased, along with the channel 25 construction permit, by Family Group Broadcasting in 1985.

Family Group handled the construction process. The call sign on the permit was changed from WWQI to WLAX; land was purchased at the La Crosse market antenna farm in La Crescent, Minnesota (though it ultimately used an existing tower); and programming was purchased for the first independent station in the market. After delays, WLAX signed on on November 10, 1986.

=== Construction of WEUX ===
The addition of a channel 48 station at Chippewa Falls had been planned since the mid-1980s. Pat Bushland of Bushland Radio Specialties, owner of radio station WCFW, was first to apply for the station in 1984. Family Group Broadcasting then also filed for the channel in September 1986; helped by its favorable comparative hearing status as not already owning a station in Chippewa Falls, it prevailed in a settlement with Bushland in 1987 and announced plans to build it as a satellite of WLAX. Family Group struggled to find an antenna site. In 1988, the company switched to a proposed location near Colfax only to face rejection from the Federal Aviation Administration. Meanwhile, the company's finances were unraveling. In 1989, the company filed for Chapter 7 bankruptcy. Two attempts, one before and one after the bankruptcy, to sell the station group to Krypton Broadcasting fell through. In February 1990, Aries Telecommunications agreed to buy part of the company: WLAX, the WEUX construction permit, and WGBA-TV (the former WLRE-TV). However, the sale took most of the year to be completed after one of Family Group's creditors, television programming supplier MCA Television, objected to the repayment plan only to be overruled by a bankruptcy judge.

After the deal was consummated in October 1991, the Federal Communications Commission (FCC) approved a key modification of the WEUX construction permit, allowing construction to finally proceed at a site near Lafayette. The station finally began broadcasting on February 9, 1993, as a straight simulcast of WLAX. Bushland later told the Eau Claire Leader-Telegram that he had hoped channel 48 would be a more local station, not merely a pass-through for WLAX. Previously, viewers in Eau Claire, Chippewa Falls, and other locations in the market's northern portion had to rely on cable to watch Fox programming. A new tower was built for WEUX at Colfax in 1995, housing a new transmitter facility broadcasting at the increased effective radiated power of 1.5 million watts. Grant Broadcasting acquired WLAX/WEUX from Aries in 1996.

=== Modern history ===
Both stations discontinued analog broadcasts on February 17, 2009. While the national digital TV transition was delayed to June, all of the major commercial stations in La Crosse and Eau Claire converted on the original date.

After WEAU's tower at Fairchild collapsed in an ice storm in March 2011, WLAX allowed WEAU to use one of its subchannels for over-the-air operations in the market's southern portion until WEAU's tower was rebuilt the following January. The northern portion relied on a subchannel of WQOW in Eau Claire during this time. The subchannels brought NBC programming to the few viewers in the market without access to cable or satellite until WEAU brought its own tower back online.

On November 6, 2013, Nexstar Broadcasting Group announced that it would purchase the Grant stations, including WLAX/WEUX, for $87.5 million. The sale was completed on December 1, 2014.

== Newscasts ==
In 1995, WLAX/WEUX began carrying two-minute newsbreaks before 6 and 10 p.m. and a monthly community affairs program, Impact.

Beginning August 28, 2006, WLAX/WEUX began airing a 30-minute nightly 9 p.m. newscast, produced by WEAU at its studios.

== Technical information ==
From their transmitters in La Crescent and southeast of Colfax, respectively, WLAX and WEUX broadcast two shared channels (Fox and Antenna TV) as well as two unique diginets each from Scripps Networks. In 2016, when Nexstar reached a group deal for carriage of the then-Katz Broadcasting diginets, separate offerings were launched from each transmitter.

=== WLAX subchannels ===
Subchannels of WLAX
Subchannel	Res.	Short name	Programming
25.1	720p	WLAX-HD	Fox
25.2	480i	WLAXANT	Antenna TV
25.3	480i	Laff	Laff
25.4	480i	Grit	Grit

=== WEUX subchannels ===
Subchannels of WEUX
Subchannel	Res.	Short name	Programming
48.1	720p	WEUX-HD	Fox
48.2	480i	WEUXANT	Antenna TV
48.3	480i	Escape	Ion Mystery
48.4	480i	Bounce	Bounce TV
