= WLEX-TV =

Television station in Lexington, Kentucky

- Lexington, Kentucky; United States
- Channels: Digital: 28 (UHF); Virtual: 18
- Branding: LEX 18

Programming
- Affiliations: 18.1: NBC; for others, see § Subchannels

Ownership
- Owner: E. W. Scripps Company; (Scripps Broadcasting Holdings LLC)
- Sister stations: WTVQ-DT

History
- First air date: March 15, 1955
- Former channel numbers: Analog: 18 (UHF, 1955–2009); Digital: 39 (UHF, 2004–2019)
- Former affiliations: All secondary: DuMont (1955); ABC (1955–1961); CBS (1962–1968)
- Call sign meaning: Lexington

Technical information
- Licensing authority: FCC
- Facility ID: 73203
- ERP: 676 kW
- HAAT: 283.4 m (930 ft)
- Transmitter coordinates: 38°2′3″N 84°23′39″W

Links
- Public license information: Public file; LMS
- Website: www.lex18.com

WLEX-TV (channel 18) is a television station in Lexington, Kentucky, United States, affiliated with NBC. It is owned by the E. W. Scripps Company alongside ABC/MyNetworkTV affiliate WTVQ-DT (channel 36). The two stations share studios on Russell Cave Road (KY 353) in Lexington and transmitter facilities on the outer loop of Man o' War Boulevard (KY 1425) in the Brighton section of Fayette County (adjacent to WTVQ-DT's former studios).

WLEX-TV began broadcasting in March 1955 as the first television station in Lexington, primarily an NBC affiliate for its entire history. Its founding ownership retained ownership for 44 years until it was sold to Cordillera Communications in 1999; Scripps acquired it in 2019. It has generally been competitive in news ratings throughout its history, merging with the lower-rated WTVQ in 2026.

== History ==
When the Federal Communications Commission (FCC) lifted its freeze on television channel applications in April 1952 and opened the ultra high frequency (UHF) band for television, two channels were allocated for Lexington, Kentucky: 27 and 33, both in the new band. Two Lexington radio stations, WLEX (1300 AM) and WVLK, applied for channel 33, only to see the commission adjust the proposed station to channel 64. A total of four applicants sought the two channels, and in response to a petition from WVLK, channel 18 was added to Lexington from Gallipolis, Ohio, with WLEX and WVLK each amending their applications to specify the lower channel.

On February 18, 1954, two related events took place. WLAP had won the channel 27 construction permit but announced that, for economic reasons related to the failures of early UHF stations elsewhere, it would not construct the station at the present time. For the same reason, WVLK withdrew its channel 18 application, effectively handing the license to WLEX parent Central Kentucky Broadcasting Company (later WLEX-TV, Inc.), a consortium of the Gay and Bell families. The construction permit for WLEX-TV was granted on April 13, 1954, and construction was under way by the end of the year. WLEX-TV had obtained affiliations with three of the four networks of the era: NBC, ABC, and DuMont; CBS had presented an affiliation agreement described by the station manager as "not acceptable". The station began broadcasting on March 15, 1955, as the first television station in Lexington. Its launch was not heavily noticed in town: Snooky Lanson, master of ceremonies for the dedication program, asked to be taken to the TV station in a taxi and found himself at the WLAP radio studios instead. After WLAP was sold along with its construction permit, new owners built channel 27 as WKXP-TV in September 1957; originally operating as an independent station, it became Lexington's CBS affiliate months later and was then sold to become WKYT-TV.

The Gay and Bell families spun off WLEX radio in 1958 to Roy White (who renamed it WBLG) but retained WLEX-TV; the move was necessary to raise capital to shore up the money-losing television station. On January 21, 1959, the station's 654-foot (199 m) tower collapsed in a windstorm and landed on the building, inflicting significant damage; a WLEX-TV receptionist, Suzanne Grasley, was killed, and two other people were hurt. A nearby tower used by the state highway department collapsed onto the guy wires, causing an impact that buckled the mast. The station was out of service for more than a month, resuming with reduced power on February 24. After WKYT-TV switched to a full-time ABC affiliation in 1961, WLEX-TV began carrying some CBS programs the next year.

In 1964, Gay–Bell attempted to sell WLEX-TV to the Crosley Broadcasting Corporation for $2 million. Crosley officials cited the fact that WLEX-TV was the first UHF station in the nation to air network and local color programming among other factors for the purchase. However, months later, a new FCC rule barred ownership of stations with overlapping signal coverage areas. As WLEX-TV had a significant overlap with Crosley flagship WLWT in Cincinnati, the deal was called off. Instead of selling, Gay–Bell turned around and bought WCOV radio and television in Montgomery, Alabama. In 1968, WKYT-TV switched back to CBS from ABC, but ABC programs in Lexington moved to a new station, WBLG-TV, on June 2 of that year. Station ownership briefly returned to radio with the launch of WLEX-FM 98.1 in July 1969; the automated stereo rock station was sold five years later due to equipment problems and became WKQQ.

Gay–Bell family ownership outlasted the original Gay and Bell (H. Guthrie Bell died in 1969 and J. Douglas Gay in 1988). It also outlasted Harry Barfield, who had started with the station as one of its original salesmen, rising to became general manager and then chairman before dying in 1991. However, in 1998, with an impending conversion to digital television as well as a seller's market for television stations nationally, Gay–Bell opted to sell WLEX-TV. By then, channel 18 was the last locally owned station in the market, though no Gay-Bell heirs were actively involved in station operations. More than 30 parties expressed interest in purchasing WLEX-TV, including Jefferson-Pilot; the South Carolina-based Evening Post Publishing Company (now Evening Post Industries) emerged with the station in 1999 for an undisclosed sum, making WLEX-TV the company's only television property east of the Mississippi River and Lexington the company's largest market.

Unlike most NBC stations in the 1980s, WLEX did not have a complete NBC weekend morning lineup. WLEX produced multiple locally produced shows such as Call the Doctor, In the Know, and Winner's Circle, as well as local and nationally syndicated sports coverage and reruns of The Beverly Hillbillies. At the time, it aired in NBC's Saturday-morning cartoon slots, replacing multiple cartoon programs that normally aired on NBC.

In November 2009, WLEX added the Wazoo Sports Network, which was dedicated to Kentucky sports, on a digital subchannel as part of a service branded as WZLEX. Wazoo Sports filed for bankruptcy in December 2011; WLEX pulled the service at that time, with the station's general manager stating that Wazoo was "[not] strong enough to make a second commitment to it". Wazoo Sports would be replaced by MeTV.

Cordillera Communications (the Evening Post subsidiary that operated its television stations) announced on October 29, 2018, that it would sell most of its stations, including WLEX, to the E. W. Scripps Company. The sale was completed on May 1, 2019.

== News operation ==
WLEX was the first station to generally lead the news ratings in Lexington, but WKYT-TV began to edge it out in the mid-1970s. This began a dominant run for WKYT-TV's local news offerings, while WLEX-TV was typically left in second place. The lone exception was in the 1990s, when WTVQ edged out WLEX at times for the second-place position.

In the early 2000s, channel 18 rebuilt its newsroom. When WLEX passed WKYT in 2004 after a multi-year rebuild of its news department, it was front-page news; however, WKYT management asserted that the combination of WKYT and WYMT still garnered more viewers. The market has more recently been a two-station battle between WLEX and WKYT, with WLEX tending to perform better in Fayette County itself while rural areas continue to prefer channel 27.

=== Notable on-air staff ===
- Tom Hammond — sports director, anchor and contributing editor in the 1970s and 1980s
- Krista Voda — sports anchor

== Technical information ==
=== Subchannels ===
WLEX-TV's transmitter is located six miles (10 km) east of downtown Lexington near Hamburg Pavilion. The station's signal is multiplexed:

Subchannels of WLEX-TV
| Subchannel | Res. | Short name | Programming |
|---|---|---|---|
| 18.1 | 1080i | WLEX-TV | NBC |
| 18.2 | 720p | Grit | Grit |
| 18.3 | 480i | Bounce | Bounce TV |
| 18.4 | 480i | CourtTV | Court TV |
| 18.5 | 480i | QVC2 | QVC2 |
| 18.7 | 480i | ONTV4U | OnTV4U |

=== Analog-to-digital conversion ===
WLEX-TV shut down its analog signal, over UHF channel 18, at 7 a.m. on June 12, 2009, the official date on which full-power television stations in the United States transitioned from analog to digital broadcasts under federal mandate. The station's digital signal remained on its pre-transition UHF channel 39, using virtual channel 18. The station was then repacked to channel 28 in 2020.
