= WDKY-TV =

Television station in Danville, Kentucky

- Danville–Lexington, Kentucky; United States
- City: Danville, Kentucky
- Channels: Digital: 19 (UHF); Virtual: 56
- Branding: Fox 56

Programming
- Affiliations: 56.1: Fox; for others, see § Subchannels

Ownership
- Owner: Nexstar Media Group; (Tribune Media Company)

History
- First air date: February 10, 1986
- Former channel numbers: Analog: 56 (UHF, 1986–2009); Digital: 4 (VHF, 2001–2009), 31 (UHF, 2009–2019)
- Former affiliations: Independent (February–October 1986)
- Call sign meaning: Danville, Kentucky

Technical information
- Licensing authority: FCC
- Facility ID: 64017
- ERP: 1,000 kW
- HAAT: 351.9 m (1,155 ft)
- Transmitter coordinates: 37°52′50.9″N 84°19′15.9″W

Links
- Public license information: Public file; LMS
- Website: fox56news.com

WDKY-TV (channel 56) is a television station licensed to Danville, Kentucky, United States, serving the Lexington area as an affiliate of the Fox network. The station is owned by Nexstar Media Group and maintains studios on Euclid Avenue in Lexington's Chevy Chase neighborhood and a transmitter southeast of the city off Interstate 75.

Built as the market's first independent station in early 1986, the station has been affiliated with Fox since the network started later that year. It has aired local newscasts since 1995, first in partnership with another local station, WKYT-TV, and since 2022, producing them internally with its own personnel.

== History ==
On December 29, 1982, the Federal Communications Commission (FCC) granted a construction permit to Robert Bertram, an attorney, to build a new channel 56 television station at Danville. However, it took more than three years to get the station built. Officials with the Kentucky Airport Zoning Commission fretted over proximity of the proposed Mercer County mast to several aviation facilities, and while the zoning board overruled objections from the aviation community, the FCC refused to approve the site.

With a busy law practice, Bertram found he no longer had time to pursue construction of the station, having already secured an alternative tower site in Garrard County. In 1985, Bertram sold the WDKY construction permit to Backe Communications. Backe set out to build the transmitter and studios in Danville and Lexington in October 1985, and WDKY-TV began broadcasting on February 10, 1986, with 40 people employed at the station. It was the first independent station in the Lexington market and became a charter affiliate of Fox later that year.

After several venture capital investors in Backe Communications opted to exit television, owner John Backe reluctantly put WDKY and other stations up for sale. In 1989, Backe agreed to sell the station to the Pruett family of Little Rock, Arkansas, through MMC Television Corporation; the Pruetts cited the station's profitability and the demise of its only independent competitor, WLKT (channel 62), which had operated for less than a year. The deal, however, collapsed in March 1990 when the Pruetts failed to arrange the necessary financing. Act III Broadcasting was then retained by Backe as a management consultant with the option to buy a minority stake in the station.

Backe sold WDKY in 1992 to Superior Communications, a company owned by 34-year-old Perry Sook; it was his first TV station property. It took Sook 14 months to find a station to buy and assemble financing to make the deal work. Superior moved the station from its original Lexington base on Interstate Avenue to the Chevy Chase Plaza after signing a lease for the property in 1995. Sook then sold WDKY and KOCB in Oklahoma City to Sinclair Broadcast Group in 1996.

On January 27, 2020, Sinclair announced that it would sell WDKY and the non-license assets of KGBT-TV in Harlingen, Texas, to Nexstar Media Group as part of a settlement between the two companies over Sinclair's failed acquisition of Tribune Media, which was ultimately acquired by Nexstar. The deal reunited Sook, who had gone on to found Nexstar almost immediately after selling Superior, with the first station he had purchased nearly 30 years prior; it also gave Nexstar its first television station in Kentucky. The transaction was completed on September 17, 2020.

== News operation ==
On January 2, 1995, CBS affiliate WKYT-TV began producing a nightly 10 p.m. newscast for WDKY, starting a relationship that would last for 27 years. WKYT supplied all of the talent except co-anchor Marvin Bartlett, an employee of WDKY. Within two years, the newscast, which WDKY paid channel 27 to produce, made money. On March 12, 2007, WDKY began airing an hour of news on weekday mornings at 7 a.m., also produced by WKYT.

Under its new Nexstar management, WDKY ended the WKYT arrangement and began to originate its own 10 p.m. newscasts on January 1, 2022, employing a fully-staffed news department. Two days later, on January 3, WDKY debuted an expanded morning show (5–9 a.m.) and 6:30 p.m. newscast. On June 6, 2022, the station added a 7 p.m. newscast, the second in that time slot in the market.

== Technical information ==
=== Subchannels ===
The station's signal is multiplexed:

Subchannels of WDKY-TV
Subchannel	Res.	Short name	Programming
56.1	720p	FOX	Fox
56.2	480i	REWIND	Rewind TV
56.3	480i	CHARGE!	Charge!
56.4	480i	COMET	Comet

=== Analog-to-digital conversion ===
WDKY-TV shut down its analog signal, over UHF channel 56, on June 12, 2009, the official date on which full-power television stations in the United States transitioned from analog to digital broadcasts under federal mandate. The station's digital signal moved from its pre-transition VHF channel 4 to UHF channel 31, using virtual channel 56.

=== TV spectrum repack ===
WDKY moved its channel allocation from digital channel 31 to 19 at 10 a.m. on May 7, 2019, and remains on virtual channel 56.
