= WKWF =

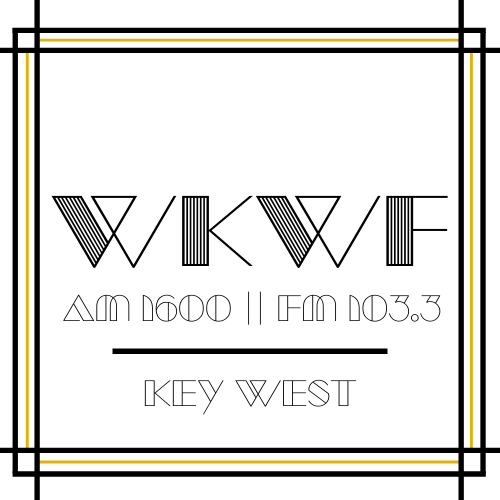

Key West, Florida; United States
- Broadcast area: Florida Keys area
- Frequency: 1600 kHz

Programming
- Format: Classic Jazz Standards

Ownership
- Owner: Spottswood Partners II, Ltd.

Technical information
- Licensing authority: FCC
- Facility ID: 31636
- Class: B
- Power: 500 watts
- Transmitter coordinates: 24°34′17.00″N 81°44′25.00″W
- Translator: 103.3 W277DX (Key West)

Links
- Public license information: Public file; LMS
- Webcast: Listen Live
- Website: www.wkwfradio.com

WKWF (1600 AM) is a radio station broadcasting a classic jazz standards format. Licensed to Key West, Florida, United States, the station serves the Florida Keys area. WKWF was founded in 1944 by John Maloney Spottswood, who was Sheriff of Monroe County and later State Senator. The station is currently owned by Spottswood Partners II,
