= WCNK =

Key West, Florida; United States
- Broadcast area: Florida Keys area
- Frequency: 98.7 MHz
- Branding: 98.7 Conch Country

Programming
- Format: Country music
- Affiliations: AP Radio

Ownership
- Owner: Michelle Weil; (Keys Country Media, LLC)

History
- First air date: 1984-12-18 (as WOZN)
- Former call signs: WOZN (1984–1996); WBKW (1996–1996)
- Call sign meaning: Conck

Technical information
- Licensing authority: FCC
- Facility ID: 34363
- Class: C1
- ERP: 100,000 watts
- HAAT: 168 meters
- Transmitter coordinates: 24°39′38.00″N 81°25′10.00″W

Links
- Public license information: Public file; LMS
- Webcast: Listen Live
- Website: conchcountry.com

WCNK (98.7 FM) is a radio station broadcasting a country music format. Licensed to Key West, Florida, United States, the station serves the Florida Keys. The station is currently owned by licensee Keys Country Media, LLC, and features programming from AP Radio.

== History ==
The station went on the air as WOZN on 1984-12-18. On 1996-08-23, the station changed its call sign to WBKW, and on 1996-11-18, to the current WCNK.

In February 2024, Florida Keys Media LLC reached a deal to sell WCNK to Keys Country Media, LLC (a company controlled by Michelle Weil). It was consummated on February 17,2025.
