= UK Sports Network =

American collegiate broadcasting network in Kentucky

- Type: Radio network Television network
- Country: United States
- Headquarters: Lexington, Kentucky
- Broadcast area: Kentucky and neighboring states
- Owner: JMI Sports (UK Sports & Campus Marketing)
- Established: September 1968
- Affiliation: Kentucky Wildcats
- Affiliates: 44 (Radio); 5 (Television)
- Official website: Radio and television affiliates

The UK Sports Network, historically known as the Big Blue Sports Network (BBSN) and also formerly known as the UK IMG Sports Network, is the radio and television network of the University of Kentucky Wildcats men's and women's sports teams. It consists of five over-the-air television affiliates and 44 radio stations in Kentucky and neighboring states.

== History ==
The radio network was established in September 1968 for the purpose of broadcasting football and basketball games to select radio stations across the state of Kentucky. Prior to this, individual stations in central Kentucky each held their own coverage of the games. The original group rightsholder was Host Communications. Later on, the broadcast syndicator of the UK Sports Network was Sports Productions, a joint venture of Host Communications, CBS television affiliate WKYT-TV of Lexington, and radio stations WVLK of Lexington and WHAS of Louisville. Cawood Ledford and Ralph Hacker were the first play-by-play commentators for the network.

In 2007, HOST Communications, a college sports marketing company based in the university's home city of Lexington, that had operated the Big Blue Sports Network, was purchased by the entertainment management company IMG. However, the name of the network did not change until the 2010–11 academic year.

=== Sale of media rights to JMI Sports ===
On June 23, 2014, University of Kentucky Athletic Director Mitch Barnhart announced that JMI Sports, owned by former San Diego Padres owner John Moores, had been awarded the multimedia rights to all University of Kentucky sports teams. UK's contract with JMI Sports was to initially begin upon the expiration of the university's contract with IMG College in April 2015. The university's contract with JMI include:

- Radio rights to UK's football, men's and women's basketball and baseball games (Television rights are covered by Southeastern Conference broadcasting arrangements, including the SEC Network);
- Stadium and arena corporate signage and game programs for all home UK events. (Prior to 2018, Rupp Arena corporate signage was managed by Learfield Sports (Rupp Arena Sports and Entertainment Properties) under a contract with the Lexington Center Corporation (LCC), who manages the arena for the Lexington-Fayette Urban County Government. In 2018, control of all multimedia rights for the Lexington Center (including Rupp Arena), including naming rights, were turned over to the university, who subsequently awarded those rights to JMI.;
- Naming rights to university athletics facilities and premium areas;
- Sponsorship on UKathletics.com;
- Game sponsorships and game promotions;
- Coaches' endorsements;
- Pre and postgame television shows and specials and postseason highlight DVDs;
- Video features on video boards;
- Opportunities to develop UK Athletics Corporate Partnership Program; and
- The potential, at the university's discretion, to market campus multimedia rights, creating the potential for an integrated approach to multimedia rights and marketing.

On October 27, 2014, JMI Sports announced that they had bought out the final year of IMG's contract with the University of Kentucky. As part of that agreement with IMG, JMI immediately took over management of the entire University of Kentucky's Sports Marketing program, including the UK Sports Network.

On January 27, 2020, it was announced that Lexington Center's overall naming rights were sold to Central Bank, a local community bank, by the Lexington Center Corporation and JMI Sports. The Rupp name will continue to receive primacy in the fourteen-year agreement for the arena portion of the complex, and be known as "Rupp Arena at Central Bank Center".

== On-air personalities ==
=== Current ===
- Tom Leach – play-by-play commentator (football 1997–present, men's basketball, 2001–present)
- Jack "Goose" Givens – game analyst (men's basketball, 2022–present)
- Jeff Piecoro – game analyst (football)

=== Former ===
- Claude Sullivan, play-by-play commentator (men's basketball and football 1948–1967)
- Cawood Ledford, play-by-play commentator (1953–1992)
- Ralph Hacker – color analyst (1973–1993), play-by-play commentator (men's basketball 1993–2001, football 1993–1997)
- JB Faulconer, play by play commentator (1944–1953) men's basketball (Rupp), men's football (Bryant)
- Neil Price – play-by-play commentator (women's basketball, 2005–2017)
- Mike Pratt – color analyst (men's basketball and football 2001–2022)

== Over-the air television affiliates ==
=== Current ===
City of license (Market)	Station	Channel	Primary affiliation	Notes
Bowling Green	WBKO; WBKO-DT2	13.1; 13.2	ABC; Fox	
Cincinnati	WCPO-TV	9.1	ABC	
Johnson City/Bristol, TN-VA	WJHL	11.1	CBS	
Lexington	WLEX-TV	18.1	NBC	Flagship station of the network's television division
Louisville	WHAS	11.1	ABC	
Nashville	WTVF	5.1	CBS	
Paducah	WPSD	6.1	NBC	

=== Former ===
City of license/Market	Station	Channel	Primary affiliation	Notes
Cape Girardeau, MO	KBSI-DT2	22.2	MyNetworkTV	Simulcast of WDKA/Paducah
Evansville, IN	WTVW	7.1	The CW	
Hazard	WYMT-TV	57.1	CBS	Semi-satellite of WKYT/Lexington
Hopkinsville	WKAG-CA	43	America One	This station went defunct in 2011.
Huntington, WVA (Charleston)	WSAZ	3.1	NBC	
Lexington	WKYT-TV	27.1	CBS	Acted as the network's television flagship until 2020.
Louisville	WDRB	41.1	Fox	Replaced by WBKI in 2016.
Salem, Indiana (Louisville)	WBKI	58.1	The CW	Formerly WMYO; replaced the original WBKI in 2017.

== Radio ==
All listed radio stations are sorted by city of license. Areas served by these stations will vary. Most affiliates air coverage of football and men's basketball, unless otherwise specified.

Callsign	Frequency	Band	City	State	Network status
WLAP	630	AM	Lexington	Kentucky	Flagship
WBUL-FM	98.1	FM	Lexington	Kentucky	Flagship
WCMI	1340	AM	Ashland	Kentucky	Affiliate
WCBL	1290	AM	Benton	Kentucky	Affiliate
WLFX	106.7	FM	Berea	Kentucky	Affiliate
WMMG	1140	AM	Brandenburg	Kentucky	Affiliate
WMMG-FM	93.5	FM	Brandenburg	Kentucky	Affiliate
WGGC	95.1	FM	Bowling Green	Kentucky	Affiliate
WSEK-FM	93.9	FM	Burnside-Somerset	Kentucky	Affiliate
WKDZ	1110	AM	Cadiz	Kentucky	Affiliate
WKDZ-FM	106.5	FM	Cadiz	Kentucky	Affiliate
WCKQ	104.1	FM	Campbellsville	Kentucky	Affiliate
WAIN	1270	AM	Columbia	Kentucky	Affiliate
WAIN-FM	93.5	FM	Columbia	Kentucky	Affiliate
WCTT	680	AM	Corbin	Kentucky	Affiliate
WCTT-FM	107.3	FM	Corbin	Kentucky	Affiliate
WCMI-FM	92.7	FM	Catlettsburg-Ashland-Huntington	Kentucky	Affiliate
WFLE	1060	AM	Flemingsburg	Kentucky	Affiliate
WFLE-FM	95.1	FM	Flemingsburg	Kentucky	Affiliate
WFRT	103.7	FM	Frankfort	Kentucky	Affiliate
WUGO	99.7	FM	Grayson	Kentucky	Affiliate
WCBL-FM	99.1	FM	Grand Rivers-Benton-Calvert City	Kentucky	Affiliate
WLGC-FM	105.7	FM	Greenup	Kentucky	Affiliate
WKYA	105.5	FM	Greenville	Kentucky	Men's basketball
WXBC	104.3	FM	Hardinsburg	Kentucky	Affiliate
WFSR	970	AM	Harlan	Kentucky	Affiliate
WTUK	105.1	FM	Harlan	Kentucky	Affiliate
WXMZ	99.9	FM	Hartford-Beaver Dam	Kentucky	Affiliate
WSGS	101.1	FM	Hazard	Kentucky	Affiliate
WSON	860	AM	Henderson	Kentucky	Affiliate
WHOP	1230	AM	Hopkinsville	Kentucky	Affiliate
W257EV	99.3	FM	Hopkinsville	Kentucky	n/a (WHOP simulcast)
WHOP-FM	98.7	FM	Hopkinsville	Kentucky	Affiliate
WJRS	104.9	FM	Jamestown-Russell Springs	Kentucky	Affiliate
WIFX-FM	94.3	FM	Jenkins-Pikeville-Hazard	Kentucky	Affiliate
WRNZ	105.1	FM	Lancaster-Danville	Kentucky	Affiliate
WKHG	104.9	FM	Leitchfield	Kentucky	Affiliate
WFTG	1400	AM	London	Kentucky	Affiliate
WWEL	103.9	FM	London	Kentucky	Affiliate
WHAS	840	AM	Louisville	Kentucky	Football/men's basketball
WKJK	1080	AM	Louisville	Kentucky	Women's basketball
WKTG	93.9	FM	Madisonville	Kentucky	Affiliate
WKLB	1200	AM	Manchester	Kentucky	Affiliate
W283AH	104.5	FM	Manchester	Kentucky	n/a (WKLB simulcast)
WLLE	102.1	FM	Mayfield	Kentucky	Affiliate
WNGO	1320	AM	Mayfield	Kentucky	Affiliate
W238AN	95.5	FM	Mayfield	Kentucky	n/a (WNGO simulcast)
WFTM	1240	AM	Maysville	Kentucky	Affiliate
WFTM-FM	95.9	FM	Maysville	Kentucky	Affiliate
WFTM	101.7	FM	Monticello	Kentucky	Affiliate
WIVY	96.3	FM	Morehead	Kentucky	Affiliate
WMSK	1550	AM	Morganfield	Kentucky	Affiliate
WBKR	92.5	FM	Owensboro	Kentucky	Affiliate
WOMI	1490	AM	Owensboro	Kentucky	Affiliate
WKYX	570	AM	Paducah	Kentucky	Affiliate
WSIP	1490	AM	Paintsville	Kentucky	Affiliate
WSIP-FM	98.9	FM	Paintsville	Kentucky	Affiliate
WPKE	1240	AM	Pikeville	Kentucky	Affiliate
WDHR	93.1	FM	Pikeville	Kentucky	Affiliate
WDOC	1310	AM	Prestonsburg	Kentucky	Affiliate
WQHY	95.5	FM	Prestonsburg	Kentucky	Affiliate
WWKY-FM	104.9	FM	Princeton	Kentucky	Affiliate
WPKY	1580	AM	Princeton	Kentucky	Affiliate
WREF	97.7	FM	Sebree-Madisonville	Kentucky	Affiliate
WAKY-FM	103.5	FM	Radcliff-Elizabethtown-Fort Knox	Kentucky	Football/men's basketball
W243CU	96.5	FM	Sebree-Henderson	Kentucky	n/a (WSON simulcast)
WSFC	1240	AM	Somerset	Kentucky	Affiliate
WMSK-FM	101.3	FM	Sturgis-Morganfield	Kentucky	Affiliate
WXKQ-FM	103.9	FM	Whitesburg	Kentucky	Affiliate
WTCW	920	AM	Whitesburg	Kentucky	Affiliate
WEZJ-FM	104.3	FM	Williamsburg	Kentucky	Affiliate
WNKR	106.7	FM	Williamstown-Dry Ridge	Kentucky	Affiliate
WCKY	1530	AM	Cincinnati	Ohio	Affiliate
WKYX-FM	94.3	FM	Golconda	Illinois	Affiliate
WRVC	930	AM	Huntington	West Virginia	Football
WEKX	102.7	FM	Jellico-Williamsburg	Tennessee	Affiliate
WDXC	102.3	FM	Pound, Virginia	Virginia	Affiliate

== Notable former affiliates ==
City of license (Area served)	Station	Frequency	Notes
Bowling Green	WBGN	AM 1340	Affiliate 1983–19??
Bowling Green	WLBJ	AM 1410	This station went defunct in 1991
Lexington	WVLK	AM 590	Flagship station, 1968–2000
Russellville	WRUS	AM 610	Affiliate, 1968–198?
Russellville	WAKQ	FM 101.1	Affiliate, 1974–1984; operations relocated to Nashville in 1994.

== See also ==
- Vol Network, the Tennessee statewide network of the Tennessee Volunteers, Kentucky's southern neighbor.
