= Cincinnati Reds Radio Network =

Official radio network of MLB's Cincinnati Reds

- Type: Radio network
- Country: United States
- Headquarters: Cincinnati, Ohio
- Broadcast area: Ohio; Indiana; Kentucky; North Carolina (limited); Tennessee (limited); West Virginia (limited)
- Owner: Cincinnati Reds
- Affiliation: MLB
- Affiliates: 69, including 1 flagship
- Official website: www.mlb.com/reds/fans/radio/reds-radio-network/

The Cincinnati Reds Radio Network is an American radio network composed of 69 radio stations which carry English-language coverage of the Cincinnati Reds, a professional baseball team in Major League Baseball (MLB). Cincinnati station WLW (700 AM) serves as the network's flagship; WLW also simulcasts over a low-power FM translator. The network also includes 68 affiliates in the U.S. states of Ohio, Indiana, Kentucky, North Carolina, Tennessee and West Virginia: fifty-three AM stations, thirty-nine of which supplement their signals with one or more low-power FM translators, and fifteen full-power FM stations.

From 2007 through 2019, Marty Brennaman and Jeff Brantley served as the network's primary play-by-play announcers. Brennaman announced in January 2019 that he would retire at the end of the 2019 season, his 46th calling Reds games. He broadcast his final Reds game on September 26, 2019. Brennaman was replaced by Tommy Thrall beginning with the 2020 season. Thrall had begun calling some games during the 2018 season, alternating with Brennaman and Brantley.

In addition to traditional over-the-air AM and FM broadcasts, network programming airs on SiriusXM satellite radio and streams online via SiriusXM Internet Radio, TuneIn Premium, and MLB.com Gameday Audio. Altafiber has naming rights of the network.

== Programming ==
Play-by-play announcers Tommy Thrall and Jeff Brantley call all games on-site. All regular season and most spring training games are broadcast.

== Station list ==
Network stations as of the 2022 Reds season
Callsign	Frequency	Band	City	State	Network status
WLW	700	AM	Cincinnati	Ohio	Flagship
W233BG	94.5	FM	Cincinnati	Ohio	WLW relay
WATH	970	AM	Athens	Ohio	Affiliate
W247DR	97.3	FM	Athens	Ohio	WATH relay
WRBI	103.9	FM	Batesville	Indiana	Affiliate
WKXO	1500	AM	Berea	Kentucky	Affiliate
W278CC	103.5	FM	Berea	Kentucky	WKXO relay
WGCL	1370	AM	Bloomington	Indiana	Affiliate
W241CD	96.1	FM	Bloomington	Indiana	WGCL relay
WILE	97.1	FM	Cambridge	Ohio	Affiliate
WTCO	1450	AM	Campbellsville	Kentucky	Affiliate
W294CO	106.7	FM	Campbellsville	Kentucky	WTCO relay
WKKI	94.3	FM	Celina	Ohio	Affiliate
WCHS	580	AM	Charleston	West Virginia	Affiliate
W243DR	96.5	FM	Charleston	West Virginia	WCHS relay
WBEX	1490	AM	Chillicothe	Ohio	Affiliate
W224BR	92.7	FM	Chillicothe	Ohio	WBEX relay
WAIN	970	AM	Columbia	Kentucky	Affiliate
W270DI	101.9	FM	Columbia	Kentucky	WAIN relay
WBNS-FM	97.1	FM	Columbus	Ohio	Affiliate
WBNS	1460	AM	Columbus	Ohio	Overflow Affiliate for WBNS-FM Programming Conflict
WLPK	1580	AM	Connersville	Indiana	Affiliate
W296BA	106.9	FM	Connersville	Indiana	WLPK relay
WCVL	1550	AM	Crawfordsville	Indiana	Affiliate
W221CS	92.1	FM	Crawfordsville	Indiana	WCVL relay
W283AQ	104.5	FM	Cross Lanes	West Virginia	WCHS relay
WCYN	1400	AM	Cynthiana	Kentucky	Affiliate
W267CW	101.3	FM	Cynthiana	Kentucky	WCYN relay
WING	1410	AM	Dayton	Ohio	Affiliate
WIEL	1400	AM	Elizabethtown	Kentucky	Affiliate
W291CU	106.1	FM	Elizabethtown	Kentucky	WIEL relay
WEKB	1460	AM	Elkhorn City	Kentucky	Affiliate
W282BZ	104.3	FM	Elkhorn City	Kentucky	WEKB relay
WHBE-FM	105.7	FM	Eminence-Frankfort	Kentucky	Affiliate
WBVI	96.7	FM	Findlay	Ohio	Affiliate
WFOB	1430	AM	Fostoria	Ohio	Affiliate
W289CP	105.7	FM	Fostoria	Ohio	WFOB relay
WCDS	1230	AM	Glasgow	Kentucky	Affiliate
W284DH	104.7	FM	Glasgow	Kentucky	WCDS relay
WGOH	1370	AM	Grayson	Kentucky	Affiliate
W265CH	100.9	FM	Grayson	Kentucky	WGOH relay
WUGO	99.7	FM	Grayson	Kentucky	Affiliate
WSRW	1590	AM	Hillsboro	Ohio	Affiliate
W268CC	101.5	FM	Hillsboro	Ohio	WSRW relay
WHOP	1230	AM	Hopkinsville	Kentucky	Affiliate
W237BV	95.3	FM	Hopkinsville	Kentucky	WHOP relay
WVHU	800	AM	Huntington	West Virginia	Affiliate
WITO	1230	AM	Ironton	Ohio	Affiliate
WYPC	1330	AM	Jackson	Ohio	Affiliate
WCJO	97.7	AM	Jackson	Ohio	Affiliate
WETB	790	AM	Johnson City-Kingsport-Bristol	Tennessee	Affiliate
WZWB	1420	AM	Kenova-Huntington	West Virginia	Affiliate
WLXG	1300	AM	Lexington	Kentucky	Affiliate
W223CV	92.5	FM	Lexington	Kentucky	WLXG relay
WIMA	1150	AM	Lima	Ohio	Affiliate
WVOW	1290	FM	Logan	West Virginia	Affiliate
WVOW-FM	101.9	FM	Logan	West Virginia	Affiliate
WFTG	1400	AM	London	Kentucky	Affiliate
W295CC	106.9	FM	London	Kentucky	WFTG relay
WHBE	680	AM	Louisville	Kentucky	Affiliate
WXGO	1270	AM	Madison	Indiana	Affiliate
WMOA	1490	AM	Marietta	Ohio	Affiliate
W267CQ	101.3	FM	Marietta	Ohio	WMOA relay
WMDJ	100.1	FM	Martin	Kentucky	Affiliate
WDLR	1270	AM	Marysville	Ohio	Affiliate
W244DV	96.7	FM	Marysville	Ohio	WDLR relay
WTIG	990	AM	Massillon	Ohio	Affiliate
WFTM	1240	AM	Maysville	Kentucky	Affiliate
WZZW	1600	AM	Milton	West Virginia	Affiliate
W267CP	101.3	FM	Montgomery	Indiana	WAMW relay
WMOR-FM	106.1	FM	Morehead-West Liberty	Kentucky	Affiliate
WVXG	95.1	FM	Mount Gilead	Ohio	Affiliate
WMUN	1340	AM	Muncie	Indiana	Affiliate
W275AV	102.9	FM	Muncie	Indiana	WMUN relay
WLOC	1150	AM	Munfordville	Kentucky	Affiliate
W269DD	101.7	FM	Munfordville	Kentucky	WLOC relay
WNOS	1450	AM	New Bern	North Carolina	Affiliate
W272EK	102.3	FM	New Bern	North Carolina	WNOS relay
WKYH	600	AM	Paintsville	Kentucky	Affiliate
W257EE	99.3	FM	Paintsville	Kentucky	WKYH relay
WLSI	900	AM	Pikeville	Kentucky	Affiliate
WPKE	1240	AM	Pikeville	Kentucky	Affiliate
W240CL	95.9	FM	Pikeville	Kentucky	WLSI relay
W251AI	98.1	FM	Pikeville	Kentucky	WPKE relay
WWKU	1450	AM	Plum Springs-Bowling Green	Kentucky	Affiliate
W223DL	92.5	FM	Plum Springs-Bowling Green	Kentucky	WWKU relay
WPGW	1440	AM	Portland	Indiana	Affiliate
WPGW-FM	100.9	FM	Portland	Indiana	Affiliate
W287BC	105.3	FM	Portland	Indiana	WPGW relay
WNXT	1260	AM	Portsmouth	Ohio	Affiliate
W239CQ	95.7	FM	Portsmouth	Ohio	WNXT relay
WSJD	100.5	FM	Princeton	Indiana	Affiliate
WMOV	1360	AM	Ravenswood	West Virginia	Affiliate
W228DJ	93.5	FM	Ravenswood	West Virginia	WMOV relay
WKBV	1490	AM	Richmond	Indiana	Affiliate
W265DN	100.9	FM	Richmond	Indiana	WKBV relay
WEKY	1340	AM	Richmond	Kentucky	Affiliate
W223CU	92.5	FM	Richmond	Kentucky	WEKY relay
W295DM	106.9	FM	Point Pleasant	West Virginia	WMOV relay
WSLM	1220	AM	Salem	Indiana	Affiliate
WSLM-FM	97.9	FM	Salem	Indiana	Affiliate
WMVR-FM	105.5	FM	Sidney	Ohio	Affiliate
WSFC	1240	AM	Somerset	Kentucky	Affiliate
WTLO	1480	AM	Somerset	Kentucky	Affiliate
WNDI	1550	FM	Sullivan	Indiana	Affiliate
WNDI-FM	95.3	FM	Sullivan	Indiana	Affiliate
WAMW	1580	AM	Washington	Indiana	Affiliate
W240CE	95.9	FM	Washington	Indiana	WAMW relay
WCHO	1250	AM	Washington Court House	Ohio	Affiliate
WTCW	920	AM	Whitesburg	Kentucky	Affiliate
W273BC	102.5	FM	Whitesburg	Kentucky	WTCW relay
WBTH	1400	AM	Williamson	West Virginia	Affiliate
W273BC	102.5	FM	Williamson	West Virginia	WBTH relay
WHIZ	1240	AM	Zanesville	Ohio	Affiliate
W253CF	98.5	FM	Zanesville	Ohio	WILE relay
W272EE	102.3	FM	Zanesville	Ohio	WHIZ relay

Blue background indicates low-power FM translator.

=== Network map(s) ===
Network stations in Ohio
Network stations in Indiana
Network stations in Kentucky
Network stations in West Virginia
Network station in Tennessee
Network station in North Carolina

== See also ==
- List of current MLB broadcasters
- List of XM Satellite Radio channels
- List of Sirius Satellite Radio stations
