= WAIN =

WAIN may refer to:

- WAIN (AM), a radio station (1270 AM) licensed to Columbia, Kentucky, United States
- WAIN-FM, a radio station (93.5 FM) licensed to Columbia, Kentucky, United States
