= WEZJ =

WEZJ may refer to:

- WEZJ-FM, a radio station (104.3 FM) licensed to serve Williamsburg, Kentucky, United States
- WCWC, a defunct radio station (1430 AM) formerly licensed to serve Williamsburg, which held the call sign WEZJ until September 2007
