= WHOP =

WHOP may refer to:

- WHOP (AM), a radio station at 1230 AM licensed to Hopkinsville, Kentucky
- WHOP-FM, a radio station at 98.7 FM licensed to Hopkinsville, Kentucky
- Whop.com, an American social commerce platform
- Whop Philyor (born 1998), American football player
