= WCKQ =

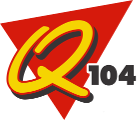
- Campbellsville, Kentucky; United States
- Broadcast area: Campbellsville, Kentucky
- Frequency: 104.1 MHz
- Branding: Q104

Programming
- Format: CHR (Top 40)
- Affiliations: ABC News Radio; UK Sports Network; Taylor County High School

Ownership
- Owner: Forcht Broadcasting; (Tri-County Radio Broadcasting Corp.)
- Sister stations: WTCO, WGRK-FM, WAIN, WAIN-FM

History
- First air date: 1965
- Former call signs: WTCO (1979–1979); WTCO-FM (1979–present)

Technical information
- Licensing authority: FCC
- Facility ID: 26644
- Class: C3
- ERP: 17,000 watts
- HAAT: 120.0 meters
- Transmitter coordinates: 37°20′07″N 85°22′33″W

Links
- Public license information: Public file; LMS
- Webcast: Listen Live
- Website: http://www.myq104.com/

WCKQ (104.1 FM) is a CHR/Top 40–formatted radio station licensed to Campbellsville, Kentucky, United States. The station is owned by Corbin, Kentucky–based Forcht Broadcasting as part of a duopoly with Campbellsville–licensed rock music station WTCO (1450 AM) and Greensburg, Kentucky–licensed country music station WGRK-FM (105.7 FM). All three stations share studios and WCKQ's transmitter facilities are located on KY 323 (Friendship Pike Road) near US 68 in southwestern Campbellsville,

== History ==
WCKQ went on the air in 1965 as WTCO-FM, an FM companion to the daytime-only AM station WTCO (1450 AM), allowing that station to air 24-hour programming. In 1978, WTCO-AM-FM came under the principal ownership of Lowell Caulk. He undertook a drastic change in programming in 1980, changing calls to WCKQ and adopting a rock music format.

The simulcast arrangement between the two stations would end in 1979, when the AM station split off into a country music station as WKXJ. George E. Owens Jr. would acquire WCKQ and the again-WTCO in 1985.

In 1997, WTCO and WCKQ were purchased by Commonwealth Broadcasting, owned by Steven Newburry. The two, plus WGRK-FM, would be sold in 2014 to Forcht Broadcasting, owners of the WAIN stations in nearby Columbia, Kentucky.

== Programming ==
WCKQ features a small sampling of locally–originated programming as part of its schedule. WCKQ airs some sports programming. It serves as the local affiliate for the UK Sports Network, airing Kentucky Wildcats sports, as well as the home of Taylor County High School athletics.
