= WANV =

- Annville, Kentucky; United States
- Broadcast area: London, Kentucky
- Frequency: 96.7 MHz
- Branding: Classic Hits 96.7 (2025-present); Kool Gold 96.7 (2006-2025)

Programming
- Format: Classic hits
- Affiliations: Local Radio Networks, Fox News Radio

Ownership
- Owner: Forcht Broadcasting; (F.T.G. Broadcasting, Inc.)
- Sister stations: WFTG, WWEL

History
- First air date: 2006
- Former call signs: WANK (May 1-May 3, 2006)
- Call sign meaning: ANVille

Technical information
- Licensing authority: FCC
- Facility ID: 162367
- Class: A
- ERP: 1,850 watts
- HAAT: 152 meters
- Transmitter coordinates: 37°13′24″N 84°2′1″W

Links
- Public license information: Public file; LMS
- Webcast: Listen Live
- Website: www.967wanv.com

WANV (96.7 FM) is a radio station licensed to Annville, Kentucky, United States, and serving London. The station is owned by Forcht Broadcasting as part of a triopoly with classic country station WFTG (1400 AM) and Hot AC outlet WWEL (103.9 FM). All three stations share studios on Tobacco Road in northern London, while WANV maintains transmission facilities off Fence Road between London and Annville. The station features programming from Fox News Radio.

== Programming ==
WANV airs a broad variety of music. The station's music catalog stretches from the 1960s up to the early 2000s. WANV airs one locally based on-air program, The Morning Show, hosted by longtime Kentucky air personality Dave Begley. Begley has been with the station since 2013. Before that, the morning show had been hosted by Brian Sizemore.

Since its beginning, the station aired Dial Global's "Kool Gold" format, which later became Westwood One's Classic Hits, after the companies merged. In 2022, the station dropped programming from Westwood One, in favor of "Classic Hits 2" from Local Radio Networks, which is a rock-leaning classic hits program. The program is much more customizable for local markets.

The station often features local interviews and live remote broadcasts.

In January 2025, WANV changed its branding to Classic Hits 96.7, after nearly 20 years of being known as Kool Gold 96.7, since its inception in 2006.

== History ==
The station went on the air as WANK on May 1, 2006. On May 3, 2006, the station changed its call sign to the current WANV.
