= WGRK =

WGRK may refer to:

- WGRK-FM, a radio station (105.7 FM) licensed to serve Greensburg, Kentucky, United States
- WGRK (AM), a defunct radio station (1540 AM) formerly licensed to serve Greensburg, Kentucky
