= WSIP =

WSIP may refer to:

- WSIP (AM), a radio station (1490 AM) licensed to Paintsville, Kentucky, United States
- WSIP-FM, a radio station (98.9 FM) licensed to Paintsville, Kentucky, United States
- Western Sydney Infrastructure Plan, a road investment program in Western Sydney, New South Wales, Australia
- Wydawnictwa Szkolne i Pedagogiczne, a Polish book publisher
