= WAMW =

WAMW may refer to:

- WAMW-FM, a radio station (107.9 FM) licensed to Washington, Indiana, United States
- WAMW (AM), a radio station (1580 AM) licensed to Washington, Indiana, United States
