= Forcht Broadcasting =

American broadcasting and marketing company

Forcht Broadcasting Radio & Digital
- Type: Subsidiary
- Industry: Broadcasting, graphic design, and Web design services
- Founded: 1981
- Headquarters: Somerset, Kentucky, U.S.
- Owner: Forcht Group of Kentucky
- Website: https://forchtdigital.com

Forcht Broadcasting Radio & Digital is a broadcasting and marketing company that primarily serves small-market radio. It is a subsidiary of the Forcht Group of Kentucky. The company currently operates 26 different stations around the U.S., primarily in Kentucky.

== History ==
The Forcht Group began its foray into the broadcasting business in 1981 when its owner and founder, Terry Forcht, purchased Columbia, Kentucky radio station WAIN and started a new subsidiary known as Key Broadcasting. Throughout the years, Key Broadcasting began slowly expanding across small-market radio in Kentucky under various licenses. Forcht has even made small expansion out of state, owning stations serving Crawfordsville, Indiana and Olney, Illinois. On April 23, 2008, On April 23, 2008, Forcht Group of Kentucky announced that Key Broadcasting had been rebranded as Forcht Broadcasting.

== Stations & Programming ==
Forcht Broadcasting stations offer a wide variety of programs and musical genres. They are also affiliates for a variety of pro, college and local sports, including the UK Sports Network, NASCAR, IndyCar, Cincinnati Reds, St. Louis Cardinals, Nashville Predators, Cincinnati Bengals, Indianapolis Colts and local high school sports.

| AM Stations | FM Stations |

| Market | Station | Current Format |
|---|---|---|
| Olney, Illinois | WVLN 740 | Adult contemporary |
| Olney, Illinois | WSEI 92.9 | Country |
| Olney, Illinois | WOWA 93.7 | Classic hits |
| Olney, Illinois | WIKK 103.5 | Classic rock |
| Crawfordsville, Indiana | WCVL 1550 | Classic hits |
| Crawfordsville, Indiana | WIMC 103.9 | Classic rock |
| Crawfordsville, Indiana | WCDQ 106.3 | Country music |
| Campbellsville, Kentucky | WTCO 1450 | Classic rock |
| Campbellsville, Kentucky | WCKQ 104.1 | Contemporary hits |
| Columbia, Kentucky | WAIN 1270 | Classic hits |
| Columbia, Kentucky | WAIN-FM 93.5 | Country music |
| Greensburg, Kentucky | WGRK-FM 105.7 | Country music |
| Hopkinsville | WHOP 1230 | News/talk |
| Hopkinsville | WHOP-FM 98.7 | Adult contemporary |
| London, Kentucky | WFTG 1400 | Classic Country |
| London, Kentucky | WANV 96.7 | Classic hits |
| London, Kentucky | WWEL 103.9 | Hot adult contemporary |
| Paintsville, Kentucky | WKYH 600 | Classic hits |
| Paintsville, Kentucky | WSIP 1490 | Classic country |
| Paintsville, Kentucky | WKLW-FM 94.7 | Top 40/CHR |
| Paintsville, Kentucky | WSIP-FM 98.9 | Country music |
| Somerset, Kentucky | WTLO 1480 | Adult standards |
| Somerset, Kentucky | WYKY 106.1 | Adult contemporary |
| Whitesburg, Kentucky | WTCW 920 | Classic country |
| Whitesburg, Kentucky | WXKQ-FM 103.9 | Adult contemporary |
