= WFTM =

WFTM can refer to:

- WFTM (AM), a radio station at 1240 AM licensed to Maysville, Kentucky
- WFTM-FM, a radio station at 95.9 FM licensed to Maysville, Kentucky
