= WPGW =

WPGW may refer to:

- WPGW (AM), a radio station (1440 AM) licensed to Portland, Indiana, United States
- WPGW-FM, a radio station (100.9 FM) licensed to Portland, Indiana, United States
