= WKYH =

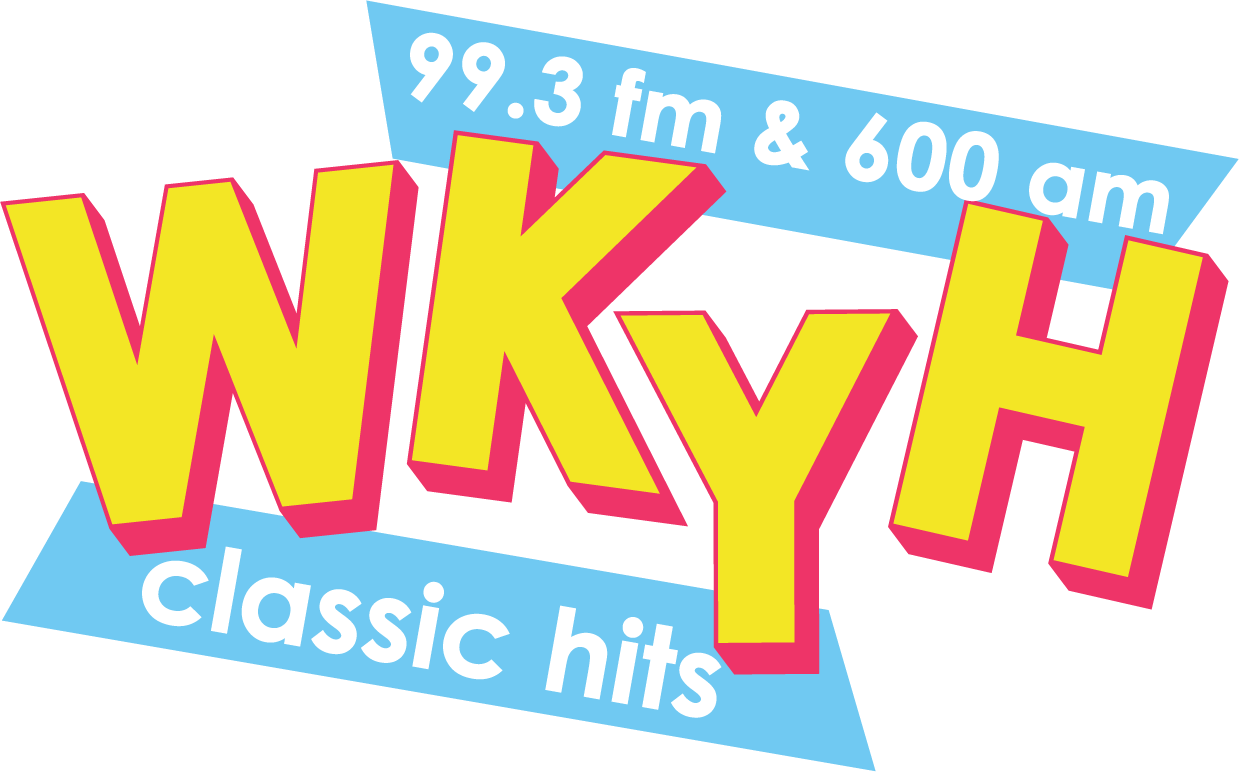
- Paintsville, Kentucky; United States
- Broadcast area: Kentucky Highlands
- Frequency: 600 kHz
- Branding: 99.3 FM & 600 AM WKYH

Programming
- Format: Classic hits
- Affiliations: Fox News Radio; Cincinnati Bengals Radio Network; Cincinnati Reds Radio Network

Ownership
- Owner: Forcht Broadcasting; (S.I.P. Broadcasting)
- Sister stations: WKLW-FM; WSIP-FM; WSIP-AM

History
- First air date: March 1985
- Former call signs: WKLW (1984–1999)
- Call sign meaning: Kentucky Highlands

Technical information
- Licensing authority: FCC
- Facility ID: 3430
- Class: D
- Power: 5,000 watts day 43 watts night
- Transmitter coordinates: 37°47′19″N 82°47′7″W
- Translator: 99.3 W257EE (Paintsville)

Links
- Public license information: Public file; LMS
- Webcast: Listen live
- Website: wkyham.com

WKYH (600 AM, "99.3 FM & 600 AM WKYH") is a radio station broadcasting a locally programmed classic hits format. Licensed to Paintsville, Kentucky. The station was licensed in 1984 and first began broadcasting in March 1985. It was purchased by Forcht Broadcasting in 2010. In addition to the AM signal, the station can also be heard via FM translator W257EE at 99.3 MHz, as well as online via Official Stream Page, on Apple and Android devices, and has an Alexa skill.

== History ==
When the station signed on as WKLW in 1985, it aired a rock and roll music station. In the early 1990s, the station began broadcasting a Gospel radio format. Under new ownership after 1999, the station aired a Conservative Talk Radio format. Ownership changed again in 2010, and the station's format also changed to Sports radio. The sports format aired on WKYH until 2018, before moving to sister station WSIP-AM. WSIP-AM's previous Classic hits format then moved to WKYH. Also in 2018, an fm translator, W257EE, was added to bring WKYH's programming to the FM dial.

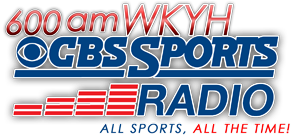
Former logo

== Programming ==
Though the station flipped to a classic hits format in 2018, some sports programming remains on WKYH. Weekday mornings, the Leach Report and Kentucky Sports Radio is heard on WKYH. The station also broadcasts Cincinnati Reds baseball games and Cincinnati Bengals football games.
