= WCDQ =

WCDQ may refer to:

- WCDQ (FM), a radio station (106.3 FM) licensed to serve Crawfordsville, Indiana, United States
- WPKC-FM, a radio station (92.1 FM) licensed to serve Sanford, Maine, United States, which held the call sign WCDQ from 1986 to 1999
- WATX (AM), a radio station (1220 AM) licensed to serve Hamden, Connecticut, United States, which held the call sign WCDQ from 1968 to 1978
