= WRZR =

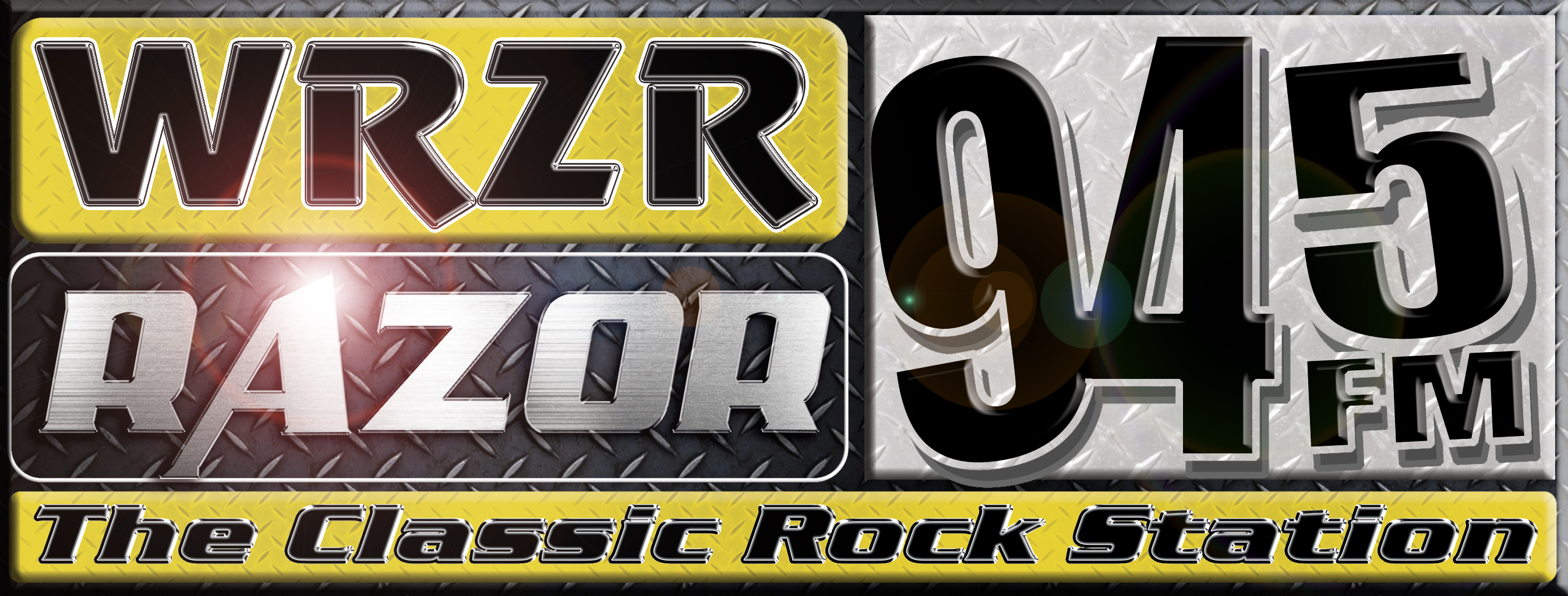
- Loogootee, Indiana; United States
- Broadcast area: Terre Haute DMA
- Frequency: 94.5 MHz
- Branding: Razor 94.5

Programming
- Format: Classic rock
- Affiliations: Local Radio Networks, Network Indiana, Indianapolis Colts Radio Network, Brownfield Ag News Network, Learfield Sports - IU Radio Network

Ownership
- Owner: DeWayne and Shelly Shake; (Shake Broadcasting, LLC)
- Sister stations: WAMW-FM, WAMW

History
- First air date: 12-07-1984 (as WKMD at 94.3)
- Former call signs: WKMD (1984–1998)
- Former frequencies: 94.3 MHz (1984–1994); 94.1 MHz (1994–1998)
- Call sign meaning: RaZoR

Technical information
- Licensing authority: FCC
- Facility ID: 12795
- Class: A
- ERP: 1,800 watts
- HAAT: 130 meters (430 ft)
- Transmitter coordinates: 38°37′9.00″N 86°58′27.00″W

Links
- Public license information: Public file; LMS
- Webcast: Listen live
- Website: razor945.com

WRZR (94.5 FM, "94.5 The Razor") is a radio station broadcasting a classic rock format. Licensed to Loogootee, Indiana, United States, the station is currently owned by Shake Broadcasting, LLC, and features programming from Local Radio Networks.

== History ==
WRZR went on the air in Southwestern Indiana on Pearl Harbor Day, December 7, 1984, as WKMD FM Radio 94.3, owned by Community Broadcasting Services of Loogootee, Donna Harris, President. The station changed frequencies on August 13, 1994, to 94.1 FM. Hembree Communications was formed and purchased WKMD in August 1997, Larry Hembree and Alan Williams. In May 2021 Hembree Communications transferred control to Daisy Holdings owned by Larry and Stephanie Hembree. In June 2022 Daisy Holdings transferred Control to Shake Broadcasting LLC owned by Dewayne Shake.

The call letters were changed to WRZR effective January 1, 1998. The station changed frequencies to 94.5 FM August 19, 1998.

== Sports programming ==
WRZR is noted for its outstanding local sports coverage, including North Daviess Cougar Football; Loogootee High School Girls’ Volleyball, IHSAA Girls’ Volleyball Tournament Coverage of Barr-Reeve, Loogootee, North Daviess, Shoals, Vincennes Rivet and Washington Catholic; Loogootee High School Boys’ and Girls’ Basketball every regular season game plus select Shoals High School Boys’ Basketball games. IHSAA tournament coverage of Loogootee, Barr-Reeve, North Daviess, Shoals, Vincennes Rivet and Washington Catholic; Inside Local Basketball, a weekly coaches' show held during basketball season featuring Loogootee Lions Coach Ryan Haywood, Barr-Reeve Vikings Coach Josh Thompson and North Daviess Coach Brent Dalrymple; Boys' and Girls' IHSAA Tournament Coverage of high school baseball including Barr-Reeve, Loogootee, North Daviess, Shoals, Vincennes Rivet and Washington Catholic; and IHSAA Tournament Coverage of high school girls' softball including Barr-Reeve, Loogootee, North Daviess, Shoals, Vincennes Rivet and Washington Catholic.

WRZR's sports on-air talent includes Greg Bateman (PBP Volleyball, Basketball, Softball, Baseball, Special Programs), John Mullen (PBP Football), Alan Williams (PBP/Com Volleyball, Football, Basketball, Special Programs), John Stoll (PBP/Com Volleyball, Basketball, Softball, Baseball, Special Programs), Josh Swartzentruber (Com Volleyball, Basketball, Softball, Baseball, Special Programs), Mike Wagoner (Com Volleyball, Basketball, Softball, Baseball, Special Programs), Dave Smith (PBP/Com Basketball, Softball, Baseball), Brayden Wessner (Com Football), Joey Rehl (PBP/Com Football, Basketball, Baseball, Softball).

WRZR is a member of the IHSAA Championship Network including tournament pairings shows and select championship network games for IHSAA Football and Basketball. WRZR is an affiliate of the Indiana Hoosiers “IU Radio Network” and “Indianapolis Colts Radio Network”, airing Indiana University football and basketball games and respective coaches' shows and Indianapolis Colts gameday coverage. WRZR is a Westwood One Sports affiliate and carries the (NFL) AFC & NFC Championships, (NFL) “Super Bowl” and the “NCAA Final Four”.
