= Key management (disambiguation) =

Key management may refer to:

- Key management, in cryptography
- Key management (access control), the management of physical keys and access devices
- Key Management, Inc., part of Forcht Group of Kentucky
