= WNDI =

WNDI may refer to:

- WNDI (AM), a radio station (1550 AM) licensed to Sullivan, Indiana, United States
- WNDI-FM, a radio station (95.3 FM) licensed to Sullivan, Indiana, United States
