= WSEI (FM) =

Coordinates: 38°42′1.0″N 88°4′53.0″W

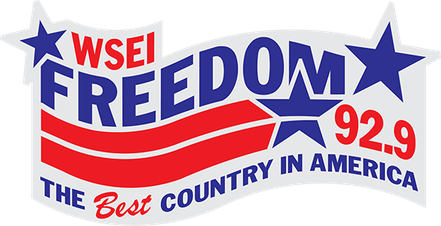
- Olney, Illinois; United States
- Broadcast area: Southeast Illinois Southwest Indiana
- Frequency: 92.9 MHz
- Branding: Freedom 92.9

Programming
- Format: Country
- Affiliations: Fox News Radio

Ownership
- Owner: Forcht Broadcasting; (V.L.N. Broadcasting, Inc.)
- Sister stations: WIKK, WOWA, WVLN

History
- First air date: 1953 (as WVLN-FM)
- Former call signs: WVLN-FM (1953-?)

Technical information
- Licensing authority: FCC
- Facility ID: 69634
- Class: B
- ERP: 49,000 watts
- HAAT: 153 meters (502 ft)

Links
- Public license information: Public file; LMS
- Webcast: Listen live
- Website: freedom929.com

WSEI (92.9 MHz) is an FM radio station broadcasting a country music format. Licensed to Olney, Illinois, United States, the station serves South-East Illinois. WSEI is currently owned by Forcht Broadcasting. The station previously had the call letters WVLN-FM.
