= WCVL =

WCVL may refer to:

- WCVL (AM), a radio station (1550 AM) licensed to serve Crawfordsville, Indiana, United States
- WCVL-FM, a radio station (92.7 FM) licensed to serve Charlottesville, Virginia, United States
