= WGRK-FM =

- Greensburg, Kentucky; United States
- Broadcast area: Campbellsville, Kentucky
- Frequency: 105.7 MHz
- Branding: K-Country 105.7

Programming
- Format: Country music
- Affiliations: ABC News Radio; Green County High School

Ownership
- Owner: Forcht Broadcasting; (Tri-County Radio Broadcasting Corp.)
- Sister stations: WAIN, WAIN-FM, WCKQ, WTCO

History
- First air date: 1977
- Former call signs: WGRK (1978–1979)
- Call sign meaning: GReensburg, Kentucky

Technical information
- Licensing authority: FCC
- Facility ID: 69852
- Class: A
- ERP: 5,100 watts
- HAAT: 109 meters
- Transmitter coordinates: 37°15′34″N 85°30′57″W

Links
- Public license information: Public file; LMS
- Webcast: Listen Live
- Website: kcountry1057.com

WGRK-FM (105.7 MHz) is a gold based country music–formatted radio station licensed to Greensburg, Kentucky, United States, and also serving Campbellsville, Kentucky. The station is owned by Forcht Broadcasting as part of a triopoly with Campbellsville–licensed rock music station WTCO (1450 AM) and Campbellsville-licensed CHR/Top 40 station WCKQ (104.1 FM). All three stations share studios on KY 323 (Friendship Pike Road) near US 68 on the southwest side of Campbellsville, while its transmitter facilities are located off Buckner Hill Road just west of Greensburg.

== History ==
The station went on the air in 1977, as an FM companion to the local AM station WGRK (1540 kHz). The station initially broadcast at 103.1 FM. Owned by Mike Wilson, both stations simulcast the same format centered around a mix of rock and country music. In 1987, Wilson split the stations' programming, with the FM station focusing solely on country music, with the AM moving to a syndicated classic hits format.

In 1997, WGRK-FM made a frequency change up to 105.7 MHz. The station would come to be acquired by Commonwealth Broadcasting, making it a sister station to Campbellsville's WTCO (1450 AM) and WCKQ (104.1 FM). All three stations would be sold in 2014 to Forcht Broadcasting, owners of the WAIN stations in nearby Columbia, Kentucky. WGRK-AM would be excluded, and shut down in 2018.

== Programming ==
WGRK-FM airs several local programs on weekdays as part of its country music format. The station broadcasts a morning show hosted by Austin Armstrong from 6–10 a.m. WGRK also features two afternoon shows: Cha from 1–3 and Catfish Hunter from 3 p.m. onwards.
