= WFLE =

WFLE may refer to:

- WFLE-FM, a radio station (95.1 FM) licensed to serve Flemingsburg, Kentucky, United States
- WFLE (AM), a defunct radio station (1060 AM) formerly licensed to serve Flemingsburg, Kentucky
