= WYKY =

- Science Hill, Kentucky; United States
- Broadcast area: Somerset, Kentucky; Pulaski County, Kentucky
- Frequency: 106.1 MHz
- Branding: Somerset 106

Programming
- Format: Adult contemporary
- Affiliations: Somerset High School

Ownership
- Owner: Forcht Broadcasting; (F.T.G. Broadcasting, Inc.)
- Sister stations: WTLO

History
- First air date: October 17, 2008

Technical information
- Licensing authority: FCC
- Facility ID: 170490
- Class: A
- ERP: 1,950 watts
- HAAT: 177.9 meters (584 ft)
- Transmitter coordinates: 37°07′53″N 84°32′21″W

Links
- Public license information: Public file; LMS
- Webcast: Listen live
- Website: somerset106.com

WYKY (106.1 FM) is a commercial radio station licensed to Science Hill, Kentucky, United States, and serving the Somerset, Kentucky, area. Owned by Forcht Broadcasting, a division of Forcht Group of Kentucky, it features an adult contemporary format. WYKY and co-owned WTLO share studios along WTLO Road west of Somerset, while its transmitter is sited atop a hill between Somerset and Shopville.

== History ==
WYKY went on the air on October 17, 2008. The station was built and signed on by Forcht Broadcasting. The station began with live local radio personalities in the morning and afternoon timeslots.

== Programming ==
WYKY principally broadcasts an adult contemporary radio format. Local programming consists of a weekday morning show under the title The Morning Mix, interrupted by a half-hour lifestyle program Mid-Mornings with Amy. The station also serves as the local broadcaster of high school sports from Somerset High School. WYKY, along with its sister WTLO, offer national and international news updates from CBS News Radio.
