= WKBV =

Richmond, Indiana; United States
- Frequency: 1490 kHz
- Branding: ESPN 100.9 & 1490 Richmond

Programming
- Format: Sports
- Affiliations: ABC Radio, ESPN Radio, Westwood One, Network Indiana

Ownership
- Owner: Rodgers Broadcasting Corporation
- Sister stations: WFMG, WIFE-FM, WLPK, WZZY

History
- First air date: 1926

Technical information
- Licensing authority: FCC
- Facility ID: 41848
- Class: C
- Power: 1,000 watts unlimited
- Transmitter coordinates: 39°49′41.00″N 84°55′57.00″W
- Translator: 100.9 W265DN (Richmond)

Links
- Public license information: Public file; LMS

WKBV (1490 AM) is a radio station broadcasting a sports format to the Richmond, Indiana, United States, area. The station is licensed to Rodgers Broadcasting Corporation and features programming from ABC Radio, ESPN Radio, Network Indiana and Westwood One. Since 1927, predating the FCC, WKBV's been the area's premier signal for info and entertainment. Local programs include, Indiana State Fair Band Day, the Salvation Army Christmas, and High School Sports.

== History ==
In 1926, William Knox was granted a permit to build a radio station in Brookville, Indiana. His name was William Knox. He chose the call letters WKBV, standing for William Knox BrookVille. The station was merely a hobby for Knox. Airtime in those days sold for $15.00.

In 1929, the station moved to the Betsy Ross Building in Connersville; its first regular programming began with six hours a day. In 1933, the station was moved to the Westcott Hotel in Richmond, IN. It was after this that WKBV became the home for Richmond Red Devil sports. RHS teacher Jim Farmer was the first Sports Director for the station, a position that would be sought after on this station. In 1943, a group of local businessmen formed the Central Broadcasting Corporation and moved the station to the Leland Hotel Annex in Richmond. In 1953, WKBV would move one last time to West Main Street in Richmond. They moved into a building built just for them. The building was state of the art. In 1960, WKBV-FM as 101.3 FM went on the air. Later on, WKBV-FM would become WRIA-FM, and then later became WFMG which is now WKBV's sister station G1013. The two have become Richmond's famous radio duo. With many cross promotions and station events.

WKBV was a pioneer in 20th Century women's radio journalism. This is where RHS grad turned Radio-TV Star Polly Bergen did her first 15-minute show auditioning for WKBV. And, from which Frances Kennedy Eward, director of the Earlham College News Bureau and instructor in radio and journalism, wrote, sold and produced her own radio shows.

Today's programming on WKBV, is mainly ESPN radio, with sports talk and more. Local news updates are provided throughout the day, and weather is supplied by Dayton's WDTN-TV Channel 2. WKBV is the home of the Cincinnati Reds and Notre Dame as well as Miami University hockey. The current key staff members include Sports/News Director Joel Brantingham, Program Director Rick Duncan and Production Director John Rose. The station is now owned by Rodgers Broadcasting Corporation dba Whitewater Broadcasting. In July, 2014, WKBV added an FM signal when W265DN 100.9 FM went on the air.
