= WVLN =

Coordinates: 38°42′00″N 88°04′53″W

- Olney, Illinois; United States
- Frequency: 740 kHz
- Branding: Lake 107.1

Programming
- Format: Adult contemporary
- Affiliations: Fox News Radio

Ownership
- Owner: Forcht Broadcasting; (V.L.N. Broadcasting, Inc.)
- Sister stations: WIKK, WOWA, WSEI

History
- First air date: November 11, 1947

Technical information
- Licensing authority: FCC
- Facility ID: 69633
- Class: D
- Power: 250 watts day 7 watts night
- Translator: 107.1 W296BV (Newton)

Links
- Public license information: Public file; LMS
- Webcast: Listen live
- Website: wvlnam.com

WVLN (740 AM) is a radio station broadcasting an adult contemporary format. Licensed to Olney, Illinois, United States, the station is owned by Forcht Broadcasting and features programming from Westwood One Sports. 740 AM is a Canadian clear-channel frequency, on which CFZM in Toronto, Ontario is the dominant Class A station; WVLN must reduce nighttime power to protect the skywave signal of CFZM.

== History ==
WVLN began broadcasting on November 11, 1947, and ran 250 watts during daytime hours only. The station was owned by Olney Broadcasting Company. In January 1958, the station was sold to Illinois Broadcasting Company for $95,000. In 1972, WVLN was sold to Public Service Broadcasters, Inc., along with 92.9 WSEI, for $265,488. In 1976, it was sold to Eugene McPherson, along with WSEI, for $352,000. In 1976, it was sold to Terry Forcht's V.L.N. Broadcasting, along with WSEI, for $1,120,000.

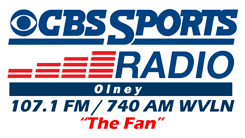
Former logo

Previous logo

== FM translator ==
In addition to the main station at 740 kHz, WVLN is relayed to an FM translator broadcasting on 107.1 MHz. The FM signal helps make up for some of the loss in coverage to the north of Olney during nighttime hours when the AM station broadcasts with only 7 watts.

Broadcast translator for WVLN
Call sign	Frequency	City of license	FID	ERP (W)	HAAT	Class	FCC info
W296BV	107.1 FM	Newton, Illinois	146848	250	27 m (89 ft)	D	LMS
