= WTLO =

- Somerset, Kentucky; United States
- Broadcast area: Somerset, Kentucky
- Frequency: 1480 kHz
- Branding: America's Best Music, WTLO 1480 AM 97.7 FM

Programming
- Format: Adult standards
- Affiliations: America's Best Music; Cincinnati Bengals; Cincinnati Reds

Ownership
- Owner: Forcht Broadcasting; (FTG Broadcasting)
- Sister stations: WYKY

History
- First air date: 1958

Technical information
- Licensing authority: FCC
- Facility ID: 14726
- Class: D
- Power: 1,000 watts (day); 27 watts (night)
- Transmitter coordinates: 37°4′50″N 84°39′39″W
- Translator: 97.7 W249DF (Somerset)

Links
- Public license information: Public file; LMS
- Webcast: Listen live
- Website: wtloam.com

WTLO (1480 AM) is a commercial radio station licensed to Somerset, Kentucky, United States. Owned by Forcht Broadcasting, a division of the Forcht Group of Kentucky, it carries an adult standards format. In addition to its primary AM signal, WTLO operates an FM translator: W249DF (97.7 FM). WTLO and its translator maintain transmitters, as well as a joint studios with WYKY, along WTLO Road west of Somerset.

== History ==
WTLO was licensed for operations on December 18, 1958. Prior to 2007, the station was owned by three individuals. In that year, the station was sold to its current owner Forcht Group of Kentucky.

== Programming ==
WTLO principally broadcasts an adult standards format with most programming comes from the America's Best Music satellite network. Local programming consists of tradio program Dial-a-Deal, which airs Monday–Saturday 7:30–9 a.m., as well as syndicated old-time radio program When Radio Was during the evening hours Sunday–Friday. WTLO features national news updates from CBS News Radio. The station additionally airs sports programming from the Cincinnati Bengals and Cincinnati Reds.
