= WKLB =

WKLB may refer to:

- WKLB (AM), a radio station (1290 AM) licensed to Manchester, Kentucky, United States
- WKLB-FM, a radio station (102.5 FM) licensed to Waltham, Massachusetts, United States
