= WTCO =

- Campbellsville, Kentucky; United States
- Frequency: 1450 kHz
- Branding: The Rock

Programming
- Format: Classic rock
- Affiliations: ABC News Radio; Cincinnati Reds Radio Network; Hilltopper Sports Network

Ownership
- Owner: Forcht Broadcasting; (Tri-County Radio Broadcasting Corp.)
- Sister stations: WCKQ, WGRK-FM

History
- First air date: 1948 (as WCLK); 1950 (WTCO)
- Former call signs: WCLK (1948–1955); WTCO (1948–1980); WCKQ (1980–1981); WKXJ (1981–1988)
- Call sign meaning: Taylor COunty

Technical information
- Licensing authority: FCC
- Facility ID: 26641
- Class: C
- Power: 1,000 watts unlimited
- Transmitter coordinates: 37°20′7″N 85°22′33″W
- Translator: 106.7 W294CO (Campbellsville)

Links
- Public license information: Public file; LMS
- Webcast: Listen Live
- Website: wtcoradio.com

WTCO (1450 AM) is a classic rock–formatted radio station licensed to Campbellsville, Kentucky, United States. The station is owned by Corbin, Kentucky–based Forcht Broadcasting as part of a triopoly with Campbellsville–licensed CHR/Top 40 station WCKQ (104.1 FM) and Greensburg, Kentucky–licensed country music station WGRK-FM (105.7 FM). All three stations share studios and WTCO's transmitter facilities are located on KY 323 (Friendship Pike Road) near US 68 in southwestern Campbellsville.

== History ==
The station went on the air as WTCO in 1948, broadcasting at 1150 AM. The station was headed by H.T. Parrott and James Schacklette with the group South Central Broadcasting. In 1950, Redman Turner would lead Taylor County Broadcasting to launch a second AM station in Campbellsville, WLCK at 1450 AM. Four years later, Clifford Spurlock would become manager and part-owner of WTCO, and would arrange a merger between the two stations in 1945. The more-powerful 1450 frequency was kept, with call letters changed to WTCO. The 1150 allotment would later be relocated to Munfordville, Kentucky.

WTCO would gain a companion on the FM band at 104.1 MHz in, providing overnight service for WTCO as it was a daytime-only station. Local businessman Lowell Caulk would become majority-owner of WTCO-AM-FM in 1978, and would make wholsesale changes in 1980. Both stations relaunched as WCKQ and adopted a rock music format as Q104. The simulcast would be maintained for only a few years, as in 1981, WTCO-AM was relaunched as WKXJ, with a country music format under the branding Kicks Country.

In 1985, Caulk sold WCKQ and WKXJ to George E. Owens Jr. and his Heartland Broadcasting. Three years later, Owens would lead the station to change its call letters back to the original WTCO. The station and WCKQ were purchased by Commonwealth Broadcasting, owned by Steven Newburry, in 1997. The two, plus WGRK-FM, would be sold in 2014 to Forcht Broadcasting, owners of the WAIN stations in nearby Columbia, Kentucky.

== Programming ==
WTCO airs an automated rock music format. The station does air a considerable lineup of sports programming. On weekdays, it airs Kentucky Sports Radio from 10 a.m. to noon, a program focused on Kentucky Wildcats athletics syndicated from WLAP (630 AM) in Lexington, Kentucky. WTCO also airs live sports events as well. While the Wildcats are aired on sister-station WCKQ, 1450 airs events from the Western Kentucky Hilltoppers via the Hilltopper Sports Network. WTCO serves as the local affiliate of the Cincinnati Reds Radio Network.

== Translator ==
In order to offer service on the FM band, WTCO operates a local translator:

Broadcast translator for WTCO
Call sign	Frequency	City of license	FID	ERP (W)	HAAT	Class	Transmitter coordinates	FCC info
W294CO	106.7 FM	Campbellsville, Kentucky	200103	250	83 m (272 ft)	D	37°20′7″N 85°22′33″W	LMS
