= WIKK =

- Newton, Illinois; United States
- Frequency: 103.5 MHz
- Branding: 103.5 The Rockin' Eagle

Programming
- Format: Classic rock
- Affiliations: Fox News Radio

Ownership
- Owner: Forcht Broadcasting; (V.L.N. Broadcasting, Inc.)
- Sister stations: WOWA, WSEI, WVLN

History
- First air date: 1992

Technical information
- Licensing authority: FCC
- Facility ID: 58366
- Class: B1
- ERP: 25,000 watts
- HAAT: 100 meters (330 ft)
- Transmitter coordinates: 39°6′20.00″N 88°10′21.00″W

Links
- Public license information: Public file; LMS
- Webcast: Listen live
- Website: 1035theeagle.com

WIKK (103.5 FM, "The Eagle") is a radio station broadcasting a classic rock format and licensed to serve the audience Newton, Illinois, United States. The station is currently owned by Forcht Broadcasting and features programming from Fox News Radio.

Forcht Group owns two other Illinois radio stations - WVLN and WSEI in Olney.
