= WWEL =

Radio station in London, Kentucky

- London, Kentucky; United States
- Frequency: 103.9 MHz
- Branding: SAM 103.9

Programming
- Format: Hot AC

Ownership
- Owner: Forcht Broadcasting; (F.T.G. Broadcasting, Inc.)
- Sister stations: WANV, WFTG

History
- First air date: 1970 (as WFTG-FM)
- Former call signs: WFTG-FM (1970–1979)

Technical information
- Licensing authority: FCC
- Facility ID: 20413
- Class: A
- ERP: 5,400 watts
- HAAT: 106 meters (348 ft)
- Transmitter coordinates: 37°08′30″N 84°04′45″W

Links
- Public license information: Public file; LMS
- Webcast: Listen Live
- Website: www.sam1039.com

WWEL (103.9 FM, "SAM 103.9") is a radio station licensed to serve London, Kentucky. The station is owned by Forcht Broadcasting, a Forcht Group of Kentucky Company and licensed to F.T.G. Broadcasting, Inc.

The station has been assigned these call letters by the Federal Communications Commission since May 21, 1979. The station had been previously assigned WFTG-FM, after its sister station WFTG (1400 AM). For several years the format was country music before the format change and rebranding of the station to SAM 103.9 (shifting to Hot AC after the shutdown of the Sam FM network during the 2015 Labor Day weekend).

Previous logo
