= WIMC =

Radio station in Crawfordsville, Indiana

Coordinates: 40°08′06″N 86°54′14″W

- Crawfordsville, Indiana; United States
- Broadcast area: West-Central Indiana
- Frequency: 103.9 MHz
- Branding: Thunder 103.9

Programming
- Format: Classic rock
- Affiliations: Westwood One

Ownership
- Owner: Forcht Broadcasting; (C.V.L. Broadcasting)
- Sister stations: WCDQ, WCVL

History
- First air date: 1974

Technical information
- Licensing authority: FCC
- Facility ID: 8094
- Class: A
- ERP: 1,350 watts
- HAAT: 151 meters (495 ft)

Links
- Public license information: Public file; LMS
- Webcast: Listen Live
- Website: wimcfm.com

WIMC (103.9 FM, "Thunder 103.9") is a radio station broadcasting a classic rock format. Licensed to Crawfordsville, Indiana, the station serves West-Central Indiana, and is owned by Forcht Broadcasting.
