= WMDJ-FM =

- Allen, Kentucky; United States
- Broadcast area: Floyd County, Kentucky
- Frequency: 100.1 MHz
- Branding: Live & Local - There’s Only One

Programming
- Format: Country
- Affiliations: Fox News Radio; Cincinnati Reds Radio Network

Ownership
- Owner: Floyd County Broadcasting Co., Inc.

Technical information
- Licensing authority: FCC
- Facility ID: 21815
- Class: A
- ERP: 2,600 watts
- HAAT: 150.0 meters
- Transmitter coordinates: 37°35′12″N 82°42′57″W

Links
- Public license information: Public file; LMS
- Website: wmdjfm.com

WMDJ-FM (100.1 FM) is a radio station broadcasting a country music format. Licensed to Allen, Kentucky, United States, the station is owned by Floyd County Broadcasting Co., Inc. and features programming from Fox News Radio and the Cincinnati Reds Radio Network.
