= 13th Kentucky Cavalry Regiment =

- Active: December 22, 1863 - January 10, 1865
- Country: United States
- Allegiance: Union
- Branch: Cavalry
- Engagements: Battle of Saltville

The 13th Kentucky Cavalry Regiment was a cavalry regiment that served in the Union Army during the American Civil War.

== Service ==
The 13th Kentucky Cavalry Regiment was organized at Columbia, Kentucky and mustered in for one year on December 22, 1863, under the command of Colonel James W. Weatherford.

The regiment was attached to District of South Central Kentucky, 1st Division, XXIII Corps, Department of the Ohio, to January 1864. District of Southwest Kentucky, Department of the Ohio, to April 1864. 2nd Brigade, 1st Division, District of Kentucky, Department of the Ohio, to July 1864. 1st Brigade, 1st Division, District of Kentucky, to January 1865.

The 13th Kentucky Cavalry mustered out of service at Camp Nelson on January 10, 1865.

== Detailed service ==
Duty at Lebanon and protecting country south of Lebanon until June 1864. Cumberland River, Kentucky, November 26, 1863. Creelsborough and Celina December 7. Cumberland River March 19, 1864. Obey's River March 28 (detachment). Expedition to Obey's River April 18–20. Wolf River May 18. Operations against Morgan May 31-June 30. Cynthiana June 12. Liberty June 17. Canton and Roaring Springs August 22. At Camp Burnside August 26-September 16. Ordered to Mt. Sterling September 16. Burbridge's Expedition into southwest Virginia September 20-October 17. Saltville, Virginia, October 2. At Mt. Sterling, Lexington and Crab Orchard, Kentucky, until December 17. At Camp Nelson until January 10, 1865.

== Casualties ==
The regiment lost a total of 94 men during service; 1 officer and 9 enlisted men killed or mortally wounded, 1 officer and 83 enlisted men died of disease.

== Commanders ==
- Colonel James W. Weatherford

== See also ==
- List of Kentucky Civil War Units
- Kentucky in the Civil War
