= WFSR =

- Harlan, Kentucky; United States
- Frequency: 970 kHz
- Branding: Harlans Christian Station

Programming
- Format: Southern Gospel
- Affiliations: Salem Communications

Ownership
- Owner: Eastern Broadcasting Company

Technical information
- Licensing authority: FCC
- Facility ID: 18284
- Class: D
- Power: 5,000 watts day 24 watts night
- Transmitter coordinates: 36°52′02″N 83°19′36″W

Links
- Public license information: Public file; LMS
- Website: www.wfsr970.com

WFSR (970 AM) is a radio station broadcasting a Southern Gospel format. It is licensed to Harlan, Kentucky, United States. The station is currently owned by Eastern Broadcasting Company and features programming from Salem Communications. The station had broadcast 1470 AM until 1990, before being granted permission by the FCC to change its frequency. The WFSR call letters applied for as an abbreviation for "fourteen seventy radio", and have been used ever since the Kentucky station went on the air in 1976. Since 1990, its facilities have been shared with Eastern Broadcasting's FM station, WTUK.

== An earlier WFSR in New York ==
Previously, the call letters had been those of a radio station in Bath, New York, WFSR (1380 AM), for the first 12 years of its existence after it began broadcasting on November 17, 1962, with the call letters WFSR as a 500 watt "daytimer" (a station that broadcast from 6:00 AM until sunset) until 1973. It was known as "Friendly Steuben Radio" (the village of Bath being located in Steuben County, New York) and the format was Country Western / Talk. In 1974, the station changed its call letters to WGHT when the station was sold to Walter Taylor, who applied for the call sign in memory of his grandfather, Greyton H. Taylor. After the station began simulcasting with its sister station WEKT-FM of Hammondsport, the former WFSR/WGHT became WVIN-FM in 1975, while WEKT-FM became WVIN-FM. By 1987, the license city for WVIN-FM had been changed to Bath, New York.
