= WHOP (AM) =

- Hopkinsville, Kentucky; United States
- Broadcast area: Clarksville, Tennessee–Hopkinsville, Kentucky
- Frequency: 1230 kHz
- Branding: NewsTalk 1230 AM/99.3 FM

Programming
- Format: Talk radio
- Affiliations: Fox News Radio; Westwood One Sports Network; Compass Media Networks; Premiere Networks; Westwood One; Cincinnati Reds Radio Network; Nashville Predators Radio Network; UK Sports Network

Ownership
- Owner: Forcht Broadcasting; (Hop Broadcasting, Inc.)
- Sister stations: WHOP-FM

History
- First air date: January 8, 1940
- Call sign meaning: Hopkinsville, Kentucky

Technical information
- Licensing authority: FCC
- Facility ID: 27634
- Class: C
- Power: 1,000 watts (unlimited)
- Transmitter coordinates: 36°52′54″N 87°30′44″W
- Translator: 99.3 W257EV (Hopkinsville)
- Repeater: 98.7 WHOP-HD3 (Hopkinsville)

Links
- Public license information: Public file; LMS
- Webcast: Listen live
- Website: whopam.com

WHOP (1230 kHz) is a commercial AM radio station broadcasting a talk format. Licensed to and serving Hopkinsville, Kentucky, United States, the station serves the Clarksville–Hopkinsville area. The station is currently owned by Forcht Broadcasting.

The station's studios are located on Buttermilk Road (known to station management as Dink Embry's Buttermilk Road in tribute to the former on-air personality of that name) off Dawson Springs Road on the northwestern outskirts of Hopkinsville. The station's transmitter is located on Witty Lane off Princeton Road northwest of Hopkinsville.

== History ==
The station first began broadcasting on January 8, 1940. The station's opening broadcast marked radio's return to Hopkinsville since its first station WFIW, which operated in the area from 1927 until 1933, had relocated to Louisville. The station, under ownership by Paducah Broadcasting Company, Inc., was presided by Pierce Lackey, who had also been operating WPAD radio in Paducah during the late 1930s, with Hecht S. Lackey, who provided the opening remarks in its inaugural broadcast, serving as station manager until he took the managing job at Henderson’s WSON when it went on the air in December 1941; F. Ernest Lackey became WHOP manager at that time. In the station's inaugural broadcast after the playing of "The Star-Spangled Banner," Lackey mentioned that the station was in the process of installing teletype machines for the news programming. Music programs were rebroadcast from WSM in Nashville, WHAS in Louisville and WLW in Cincinnati, with local talent performing at the WHOP studio.

For its first year on the air, WHOP originally started broadcasting at 1200 kilohertz with 250 watts of power from a transmitter located along Princeton Road. However, due to the North American Regional Broadcasting Agreement (NARBA) of 1941, the station reallocated its AM signal to their current frequency of 1230 kilohertz. The station's original frequency became a treaty frequency under the NARBA that was assigned to a Clear-channel station; the 1200 kHz allocation was assigned to WOAI of San Antonio, Texas.

Also in the early 1940s, WHOP was one of the first radio stations in Kentucky to expand agriculture news briefs into complete farm-related shows. In 1943, WHOP became affiliated with CBS Radio, and that affiliation remained with the station until the broadcast of the final update by CBS News Radio on May 22, 2026, thereby making the hourly news updates from CBS Radio News the longest-running program on the station. The station's original owners reassigned the station's license to a newly-formed subsidiary, the Hopkinsville Broadcasting Company, Inc., in May 1944.

In 1948, the station launched WHOP-FM at 98.7 megacycles to simulcast the AM signal. That simulcast lasted for ten years before it became a separate entity. The station has also been serving as a longtime affiliate of the University of Kentucky’s UK Sports Network, broadcasting football and basketball games since that network began in 1969.

WHOP and WHOP-FM were under the same ownership by The Lackey Family until 1999, when it was sold to its current owner, the Lexington-based Forcht Group of Kentucky.

=== Recent developments (2010–present) ===
Logo when simulcasting on 95.3

Sometime in the early 2010s, WHOP had launched low-powered FM translator W237BV to simulcast the station's AM signal onto 95.3 megahertz. In 2023, in addition to relocating its analog FM simulcast to new translator W257EV at 99.3 on the FM dial, the station also began simulcasting on a newly relaunched HD3 subchannel of WHOP-FM. W237BV now serves as a country station, which is simulcast on WHOP-FM's HD2 subchannel.

On January 8, 2020, to mark the station's 80th anniversary, a dozen historic broadcast audio clips from the past were made available for listening on the station's website. They were also rebroadcast over its FM sister station on that day.

The station began airing hourly news updates from Fox News Radio on May 23, 2026, following CBS News Radio's final broadcast the previous day.

== Programming ==
As a news-talk-information format radio station, WHOP's programming content includes local newscasts, and public affairs programs. Syndicated radio programs on WHOP include The Dave Ramsey Show, Coast to Coast AM, and America in the Morning. Hourly national news updates are provided by Fox News Radio. WHOP also provides programming from Premiere Radio Networks.

The station is also the long-time radio home of the annual Hopkinsville Rotary Club Radio Auction, which has been broadcast on the station since 1951.

=== Sports programming ===
Sports programming on WHOP-AM includes regionally syndicated sports packages of live coverage of games, including:

- MLB's Cincinnati Reds baseball from the Cincinnati Reds Radio Network (April–October)
- University of Kentucky Wildcats football, men's, and women's basketball games from the UK Sports Network (September–March), and
- NHL's Nashville Predators hockey from the Predators Radio Network (October–May).

== Translator ==
Broadcast translator for WHOP
| Call sign | Frequency | City of license | FID | ERP (W) | Class | FCC info |
|---|---|---|---|---|---|---|
| W257EV | 99.3 FM | Hopkinsville, Kentucky | 202114 | 250 | D | LMS |
