= WXKQ-FM =

Coordinates: 37.111°N 82.737°W

- Whitesburg, Kentucky; United States
- Broadcast area: Letcher County, Kentucky
- Frequency: 103.9 MHz
- Branding: 103.9 The Bulldog

Programming
- Format: Adult contemporary
- Affiliations: ABC News Radio

Ownership
- Owner: Forcht Broadcasting; (T.C.W. Broadcasting, Inc.)
- Sister stations: WTCW

History
- First air date: 1964

Technical information
- Licensing authority: FCC
- Facility ID: 64430
- Class: A
- ERP: 280 watts
- HAAT: 457.3 meters (1501 feet)

Links
- Public license information: Public file; LMS
- Webcast: Listen Live
- Website: www.1039thebulldog.com

WXKQ-FM (103.9 MHz, "The Bulldog") is a radio station licensed to serve Whitesburg, Kentucky. The station is owned by Forcht Broadcasting. It airs an adult contemporary format.

The station has been assigned these call letters by the Federal Communications Commission since July 15, 1982.
