= WOWA =

- West Salem, Illinois; United States
- Frequency: 93.7 MHz
- Branding: WOWA 93.7 FM

Programming
- Format: Classic hits
- Affiliations: Fox News Radio

Ownership
- Owner: Forcht Broadcasting; (V.L.N. Broadcasting, Inc.)
- Sister stations: WIKK, WSEI, WVLN

History
- First air date: 2015

Technical information
- Licensing authority: FCC
- Facility ID: 191487
- Class: A
- ERP: 3,500 watts
- HAAT: 126 metres (413 ft)
- Transmitter coordinates: 38°42′1″N 88°04′53″W

Links
- Public license information: Public file; LMS
- Website: wowafm.com

WOWA (93.7 FM) is a radio station licensed to serve the community of West Salem, Illinois. The station is owned by V.L.N. Broadcasting, Inc., and airs a classic hits format.

The station was assigned the WOWA call letters by the Federal Communications Commission on February 20, 2015.
