= WZBD =

- Berne, Indiana; United States
- Frequency: 92.7 MHz
- Branding: Adams County Radio Z92.7

Programming
- Format: Adult Contemporary
- Affiliations: CNN Radio, Westwood One

Ownership
- Owner: Adams County Radio, Inc

History
- First air date: August 27, 1993

Technical information
- Licensing authority: FCC
- Facility ID: 56751
- Class: A
- ERP: 4,100 watts
- HAAT: 120.0 meters
- Transmitter coordinates: 40°46′15.00″N 84°56′5.00″W

Links
- Public license information: Public file; LMS
- Webcast: Listen live
- Website: Official website

WZBD (92.7 FM) is a radio station broadcasting an Adult Contemporary format. It is licensed to Berne, Indiana, United States. The station is currently owned by Adams County Radio, Inc and features programming from CNN Radio and Westwood One.

== Programming ==
WZBD broadcasts a full-service adult contemporary music format to Adams County, Indiana. In addition to its usual music programming, the station carries local and regional sporting events.

WZBD also hosts radio auctions. They have two auction seasons: one in the winter which lasts from mid-January through March and a short season which lasts from mid-September through October.

== History ==
This station received its original construction permit from the Federal Communications Commission on November 25, 1991. The new station was assigned the WZBD call sign by the FCC on January 17, 1992. WZBD began broadcasting under program test authority on August 27, 1993. After one extension for time, WZBD received its license to cover from the FCC on December 7, 1993.

In January 1999, licensee Robert Alan Weaver filed an application to transfer the broadcast license for WZBD to Adams County Radio, Inc. The transfer was approved by the FCC on March 11, 1999, and the transaction was consummated on April 1, 1999.
