= WTCW =

- Whitesburg, Kentucky; United States
- Frequency: 920 kHz

Programming
- Format: Classic country
- Affiliations: ABC News Radio

Ownership
- Owner: Forcht Broadcasting; (T.C.W. Broadcasting, Inc.)
- Sister stations: WXKQ-FM

Technical information
- Licensing authority: FCC
- Facility ID: 64431
- Class: D
- Power: 4,200 watts day 43 watts night
- Transmitter coordinates: 37°08′46″N 82°46′01″W
- Translator: 95.1 W236CS (Whitesburg)

Links
- Public license information: Public file; LMS
- Website: wtcwam.com

WTCW (920 AM) has been broadcasting in Letcher County, Kentucky, and Wise County, Virginia, since 1953, with a nighttime range just in Letcher County and a daytime range all around Eastern Kentucky and Southwest Virginia. The station has one non-directional antenna, RMS Standard 0.00 mV/m at 1 kilometer and RMS Theoretical 334.70 mV/m at 1 kilometer.

The station's format is classic country. WTCW is owned by Forcht Broadcasting.
