= WEZJ-FM =

Radio station in Williamsburg, Kentucky

- Williamsburg, Kentucky; United States
- Frequency: 104.3 MHz
- Branding: “The County Giant” E Z Country

Programming
- Format: Country music
- Affiliations: Fox News Radio ABC Radio

Ownership
- Owner: Whitley Broadcasting Co., Inc.
- Sister stations: WEKX

Technical information
- Licensing authority: FCC
- Facility ID: 72289
- Class: C3
- ERP: 6,200 watts
- HAAT: 200.0 meters
- Transmitter coordinates: 36°44′43″N 84°11′24″W

Links
- Public license information: Public file; LMS
- Webcast: Listen Live

WEZJ-FM (104.3 FM) is a radio station broadcasting a country music format. Licensed to Williamsburg, Kentucky, United States, the station is currently owned by Whitley Broadcasting Co., Inc. and features news from Fox News Radio and programming from ABC Radio. The station is the flagship radio affiliate for University of the Cumberlands Patriots and Whitley County Colonels high school athletics and is also an affiliate of the UK Sports Network (University of Kentucky Wildcats athletics).
