= WNOS =

Radio station

- New Bern, North Carolina; United States
- Frequency: 1450 kHz
- Branding: NEWS Talk 103.9 FM 1450 AM

Programming
- Format: News/Talk/Sports
- Affiliations: Fox Sports Radio, Westwood One, ABC Radio, Wall Street Journal, Talk Radio Network

Ownership
- Owner: CTC Media Group

History
- First air date: 1942 (as WHIT)
- Former call signs: WHIT (1942-?); WJQI (?-1988)

Technical information
- Licensing authority: FCC
- Facility ID: 54363
- Class: C
- Power: 1,000 watts
- Transmitter coordinates: 35°06′03″N 77°04′33″W
- Translator: (102.3 MHz) W272EK (New Bern)

Links
- Public license information: Public file; LMS
- Webcast: Listen Live
- Website: WNOS Online

WNOS (1450 AM) is a radio station broadcasting a talk radio format. Licensed to New Bern, North Carolina, it serves the New Bern area. The station is owned by CTC Media Group. In addition to sports talk from Fox Sports Radio, it also carries Westwood One's Dennis Miller show, the self-syndicated Laura Ingraham show, and Salem Media's Michael Medved and Dennis Prager.

== History ==
WHIT signed on in 1942 as the first radio station in Craven County, North Carolina. The letters stood for "Where Hospitality Is Traditional". Later, WHIT was a country station. However, WHIT was a successful Top-40 station in the 70's, taking advantage of the "HIT" moniker.

In 1982, what was then WJQI "Radio Joy" hired Bill Benjamin, who left after the station was sold the next year. Benjamin was asked in 1988 by investors to manage the station and be one of the owners of what by then was WNOS; the transaction never happened.
