= WHOP-FM =

- Hopkinsville, Kentucky; United States
- Broadcast area: Clarksville, Tennessee
- Frequency: 98.7 MHz (HD Radio)
- Branding: 98.7 Lite FM

Programming
- Format: Adult contemporary
- Subchannels: HD2: Country; HD3: Talk radio (WHOP)
- Affiliations: Fox News Radio; Premiere Networks; UK Sports Network

Ownership
- Owner: Forcht Broadcasting; (Hop Broadcasting, Inc.)
- Sister stations: WHOP

History
- First air date: May 1948
- Former call signs: WHOP-FM (1948–1959); WRLX (1959–1964)
- Call sign meaning: Hopkinsville, Kentucky

Technical information
- Licensing authority: FCC
- Facility ID: 27633
- Class: C1
- ERP: 100,000 watts
- HAAT: 189.1 meters (620 ft)
- Transmitter coordinates: 36°55′41″N 87°32′50″W
- Translator: HD2: 95.3 W237BV (Hopkinsville)

Links
- Public license information: Public file; LMS
- Webcast: Listen live
- Website: lite987whop.com 953thefarm.com (HD2)

WHOP-FM (98.7 MHz) is a commercial radio station broadcasting an adult contemporary format. Licensed to Hopkinsville, Kentucky, United States, the station serves the Clarksville, Tennessee-Hopkinsville, Kentucky area. The station is owned by Forcht Broadcasting, and is a sister station to WHOP. The two stations share studios located at 220 Buttermilk Road on the west side of Hopkinsville.

== History ==
The station signed on the air as WHOP-FM in May 1948. It was the first FM station to sign on in the Clarksville/Hopkinsville radio market area, and the whole westernmost segment of Kentucky. Paducah's WPAD-FM (now WDDJ) and WKYX-FM signed on in the months after. WHOP-FM began broadcasting as a simulcast of its AM sister station WHOP. However, on December 4, 1959, the station became a separate operation by changing its callsign to WRLX, and beginning broadcasting an easy listening format. It was the first attempt in Kentucky at full separate FM programming since the early 1950s demise of early FM stations in the Louisville area.

The station reverted its callsign back to WHOP-FM to match its AM sister station on December 28, 1964. Upon the callsign change, the station began broadcasting an automated country music format. In the mid-2000s, in response to the station's overwhelming competition against Clarksville-based but Hopkinsville-licensed WVVR and Cadiz-based WKDZ-FM, both of which were and still are broadcasting the same format, WHOP-FM changed to its current soft adult contemporary format, and rebranded as Lite 98.7. It rebranded as LiteRock 98.7 sometime in the late 2010s. It rebranded to 98.7 Lite FM in October 2022.

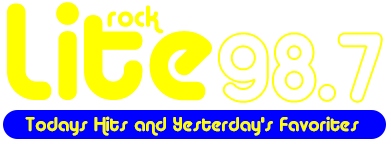
Previous logo

== Programming ==
Along with its soft AC format, the station also features programming from Fox News Radio and Premiere Radio Networks. Prior to May 23, 2026, hourly news updates were provided by CBS News Radio until that network ceased operations.

Both WHOP-FM and its AM counterpart serve as two of three affiliates in the Clarksville/Hopkinsville market that serves as an affiliate of the University of Kentucky Wildcats sports radio network, broadcasting football and men's basketball games involving the university's athletic teams. WKDZ-FM in Cadiz is the other station in the area that also serve as a UK Sports Network affiliate.

== HD Radio ==
On February 6, 2023, WHOP-FM launched a country music format on its HD2 subchannel, branded as "95.3 The Farm". It is simulcast in the analog format via former WHOP (AM) translator W237BV. On the same day, an HD radio simulcast of WHOP (AM) became available on an HD3 subchannel.
