= WGRK (AM) =

Radio station in Greensburg, Kentucky (1972–2018)

Greensburg, Kentucky; United States
- Frequency: 1540 kHz

Programming
- Format: Defunct

Ownership
- Owner: Green County CBC, Inc.

History
- First air date: 1972
- Last air date: 2018
- Former call signs: WGRK (1971–1988); WAKY (1988–2007)

Technical information
- Facility ID: 69851
- Class: D
- Power: 1,000 watts day 500 watts critical hours
- Transmitter coordinates: 37°15′34″N 85°30′57″W

WGRK (1540 AM) was a radio station licensed to Greensburg, Kentucky, United States. The station was owned by Green County CBC, Inc. and featured programming from ABC Radio and Jones Radio Network.

== History ==
The station went on the air in March 1972 under ownership by Jim Hay and Robert Towers, with Hay taking sole ownership two years later. The station initially had aired a variety format with country and rock music. The station began simulcasting on WGRK-FM (103.1 MHz, now 105.7 MHz) in 1977, one year after general manager Mike Wilson became co-owner with Hay. The AM/FM simulcast lasted for ten years before the two stations became separate entities in 1987. The FM station became country, while the AM began airing a classic hits format, received via satellite. However, the morning programming continued to simulcast on the FM.

The station changed its call letters to WAKY on April 14, 1988; the Louisville-based station that previously held this call sign relinquished control of those call letters the month before.

On November 5, 2007, the station changed its call sign back to WGRK.

The station's owners surrendered its license to the Federal Communications Commission on December 21, 2018, who cancelled the license the same day.
