= WKLW-FM =

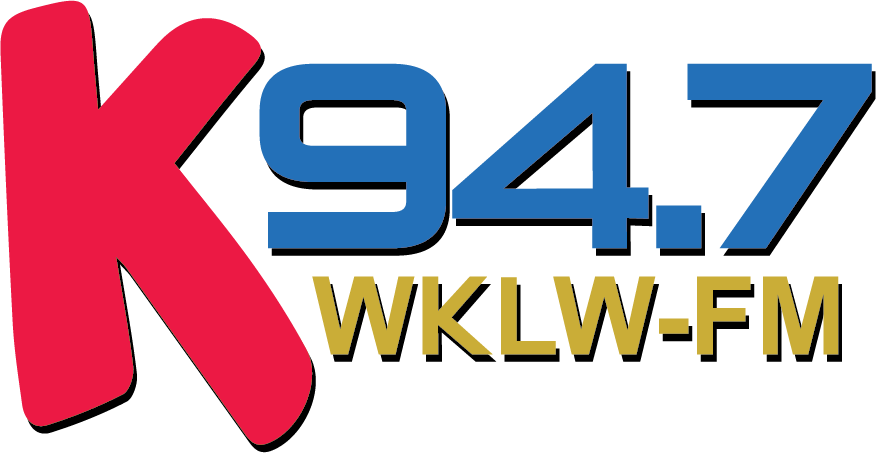
- Paintsville, Kentucky; United States
- Broadcast area: Johnson and surrounding counties
- Frequency: 94.7 MHz (HD Radio)
- Branding: K-94.7

Programming
- Format: Top 40/CHR
- Affiliations: Kentucky News Network, The Interactive Party

Ownership
- Owner: Forcht Broadcasting; (S.I.P. Broadcasting Company, Inc.)

History
- First air date: June 18, 1993

Technical information
- Licensing authority: FCC
- Facility ID: 3432
- Class: C3
- ERP: 4,900 watts
- HAAT: 223 meters
- Transmitter coordinates: 37°47′42″N 82°48′3″W

Links
- Public license information: Public file; LMS
- Webcast: Listen live
- Website: wklw.com

WKLW-FM (94.7 FM) is a radio station that was founded in 1993. It broadcasts a Top 40/CHR format. It is licensed to Paintsville, Kentucky, United States. The station is currently owned by Terry Forcht, through licensee S.I.P. Broadcasting Company, Inc., and is locally programmed. Forcht acquired the station in 2015. The station broadcasts on HD radio. online via Official Stream Page, TuneIn also on Apple and Android mobile devices.
