= WTUK =

- Harlan, Kentucky; United States
- Frequency: 105.1 MHz
- Branding: Wild Country

Programming
- Format: Country music
- Affiliations: UK Sports Network

Ownership
- Owner: Eastern Broadcasting Company

History
- First air date: August 1, 1990

Technical information
- Licensing authority: FCC
- Facility ID: 18281
- Class: A
- ERP: 530 watts
- HAAT: 316.0 meters
- Transmitter coordinates: 36°54′9″N 83°18′1″W

Links
- Public license information: Public file; LMS
- Webcast: Listen Live
- Website: wtukradio.com/

WTUK (105.1 FM) is a radio station broadcasting a country music format and is licensed to broadcast from Harlan, Kentucky, in the United States. The station is owned by Eastern Broadcasting Company.

The station broadcasts on 105.1 MHz. Its 530-watt signal covers Harlan County, Kentucky, and much of southeastern Kentucky. The FM station broadcasts 24 hours with a country music format, with daily news, coverage of local high school sports, and University of Kentucky football and basketball games on the UK Sports Network, as well as newscasts from the Kentucky News Network of Louisville.
