= WILE (AM) =

- Cambridge, Ohio; United States
- Frequency: 1270 kHz
- Branding: 107.9/98.5 Nash Icon

Programming
- Format: Country

Ownership
- Owner: AVC Communications

History
- First air date: 1956

Technical information
- Licensing authority: FCC
- Facility ID: 3363
- Class: D
- Power: 1,000 watts day 35 watts night
- Transmitter coordinates: 40°2′24.00″N 81°38′50.00″W
- Translators: 98.5 W253CF (Zanesville); 107.9 W300CB (Cambridge)

Links
- Public license information: Public file; LMS
- Webcast: Listen Live
- Website: WILE Online

WILE (1270 AM) is a radio station broadcasting a country music format. Licensed to Cambridge, Ohio, United States, the station is currently owned by Avc Communications.

Programming is simulcast on FM translator W253CF broadcasting at 98.5 FM and on W300CB broadcasting at 107.9 FM.

== History ==
WILE began broadcasting April 9, 1948. It was operated by Land-O-Lakes Broadcasting Corporation.
