= WAMW-FM =

- Washington, Indiana; United States
- Frequency: 107.9 MHz
- Branding: Memories 107.9

Programming
- Format: Classic hits
- Affiliations: Local Radio Networks; Townhall News; Network Indiana; IHSAA Champions Radio Network; Brownfield Ag News

Ownership
- Owner: Dewayne and Shelly Shake; (Shake Broadcasting, LLC)
- Sister stations: WAMW, WRZR

History
- First air date: 1989
- Former call signs: WAMW-FM (1989–2000); WYER (2000–2001)

Technical information
- Licensing authority: FCC
- Facility ID: 25209
- Class: A
- ERP: 3,000 watts
- HAAT: 100 meters (330 ft)
- Transmitter coordinates: 38°38′47.00″N 87°16′47.00″W

Links
- Public license information: Public file; LMS
- Webcast: Listen Live
- Website: wamwamfm.com

WAMW-FM (107.9 MHz) is a radio station broadcasting a classic hits format. Licensed to Washington, Indiana, United States, the station is currently owned by Dewayne and Shelly Shake, through licensee Shake Broadcasting, LLC, and features programming from Local Radio Networks.

The studios are co-located with its sister station WAMW (AM) in a former bank building on old U.S. 50 west of downtown Washington.

WAMW-FM is affiliated with Townhall News, Network Indiana, the IHSAA Champions Radio Network, and Brownfield Ag News.

== History ==
The station went on the air as WAMW-FM on August 29, 1989. It was created as a new sister station to the existing WAMW (AM) signal. On February 4, 2000, the station changed its call sign to WYER, and on October 1, 2001, the station reverted to WAMW-FM
