= WEKX =

- Williamsburg, Kentucky; United States
- Frequency: 102.7 MHz
- Branding: We Rock 102.7

Programming
- Format: Classic rock
- Affiliations: Westwood One

Ownership
- Owner: Whitley Broadcasting Co., Inc.
- Sister stations: WEZJ-FM

History
- First air date: 1992

Technical information
- Licensing authority: FCC
- Facility ID: 68133
- Class: A
- ERP: 630 watts
- HAAT: 307 meters (1,007 ft)
- Transmitter coordinates: 36°41′28.00″N 84°12′31.00″W

Links
- Public license information: Public file; LMS

WEKX (102.7 FM, "We Rock 102.7") is a radio station broadcasting a classic rock music format. Licensed to Williamsburg, Kentucky, United States, the station is currently owned by Whitley Broadcasting Co., Inc. and features programming from Westwood One.
