= WCWC =

- Williamsburg, Kentucky; United States
- Frequency: 1430 kHz

Ownership
- Owner: Whitley County Board of Education

History
- First air date: 1984
- Last air date: 2023
- Former call signs: WEZJ (1984–2007)

Technical information
- Licensing authority: FCC
- Facility ID: 72290
- Class: D
- Power: 5,700 watts day; 32 watts night
- Transmitter coordinates: 36°43′25″N 84°8′25″W

Links
- Public license information: Public file; LMS
- Website: www.whitley.kyschools.us/quick-links/wcwc-radio-station

WCWC (1430 AM) was a radio station licensed to Williamsburg, Kentucky, United States. The station was owned by the Whitley County Board of Education.
