= WPGW (AM) =

- Portland, Indiana; United States
- Frequency: 1440 kHz
- Branding: PG 14

Programming
- Format: Adult contemporary
- Affiliations: Westwood One

Ownership
- Owner: Wpgw, Inc.
- Sister stations: WPGW-FM, WZBD

History
- First air date: January 14, 1951
- Call sign meaning: Portland-Glenn West (founder/original owner)

Technical information
- Licensing authority: FCC
- Facility ID: 73877
- Class: D
- Power: 500 watts day 45 watts night
- Transmitter coordinates: 40°26′10.00″N 85°0′56.00″W
- Translator: 105.3 W287BC (Portland)

Links
- Public license information: Public file; LMS
- Webcast: Listen Live
- Website: wpgwradio.com

WPGW (1440 AM, "PG-14") is a radio station broadcasting an adult contemporary format. Licensed to Portland, Indiana, United States. The station is currently owned by Wpgw, Inc. and features programing from Westwood One.

== Early history 1951-1974 ==
Glenn West, a local electronics engineer founded the AM station in 1950 with its initial sign-on that took place January 14, 1951. From that point until the summer of 1974, West (owner/operator/original licensee) and his wife ran the station with a potpourri of big band nostalgia, middle of the road, polka and adult standards. Much of its programming was geared to older adults past the age of 50...some of the 15-inch transcription LPs were still in use in addition to public service programs produced by Armed Forces recruiters on 12 inch LPs. West anchored all local news (obits, hospital report and weather) at 12 noon and before sign-off at local sunset well into his later years when his voice aged.

ABC Radio news aired at the top and bottom of the hour and again at five minutes before the top of the hour. This practice continued well into the late 1960s and early 1970s when ABC diversified its radio network into its "demographic" networks (American Information, American Entertainment and American Contemporary). Only the American FM Network was not used. At the time WPGW was only a daytime station. An FM grant from the Federal Communications Commission (FCC) was given to West as a construction permit in 1973 but due to West's advancing age and health concerns, the station was put up for sale. At the time the station was sold to new owners, the control room studio was still equipped with the original Gates transmitter, audio console, two 15 inch transcription turntables and a reel-to reel tape recorder/playback deck. There were no audio cartridge playback machines used as most commercials were done either live by West and his wife or played directly on reel-to-reel.The adjacent on-air studio included a piano and microphone (but no audio production facilities since nearly all local programming was done live)in addition to a home-built EBS "air alert" receiver system located near the station's office. WPGW was one of the last stations in Indiana still using the original vintage equipment since its initial 1951 sign-on.

== PG-14 Radio 1974-present ==
In the summer of 1974. West and his wife retired and sold the daytime station to Bob Brandon (previously with WOWO in Fort Wayne) who replaced the musical potpourri with a mix of adult contemporary and oldies under the new corporate name and licensee WPGW Inc. incorporating a "new look" for the station using the nickname "PG-14" with ABC Contemporary news at five minutes before the hour. Top of the hour news was later provided by the now defunct Mutual Broadcasting System in the 1980s, 1990s and now by CNN Radio. Since PG-14's directional signal also covers into neighboring counties in West Central Ohio, the station in addition aired farm programming from Ohio-based Agri Broadcasting Network and its founder/director, the late Ed Johnson.

WPGW-FM signed on under Brandon's ownership on May 19, 1975. At first as a simulcast and continuation of PG-14's programming in the evening hours before WPGW-FM switched to "Jay Country 101" a country music format in 1980. Both AM and FM formats remain in place.

Contrary to popular belief, the MPAA "PG-13" rating (which was not incorporated until 1984) was not the inspiration for the "PG-14" branding. Instead it is an acronym for the call letters and frequency without having to use the "W" portions of the call sign at the beginning and end.

WPGW now operates in the evening hours with reduced power. Its normal daytime power is 500 watts.

WPGW's studios and transmitter remains located west of Portland on Indiana State Road 67 where West founded the station.

In 1980, Rob Weaver purchased both stations from Bob Brandon.

WPGW's sister station is WZBD (the former WQTZ) founded in August 1993 located to the north in Berne operating under the licensee name Adams County Radio Inc.
