= WSIP-FM =

- Paintsville, Kentucky; United States
- Broadcast area: Eastern Kentucky Appalachian Area
- Frequency: 98.9 MHz

Programming
- Format: New Country
- Affiliations: Fox News Radio; Compass Media Networks

Ownership
- Owner: Forcht Broadcasting; (S.I.P. Broadcasting Company, Inc.)

History
- First air date: January 20, 1965

Technical information
- Licensing authority: FCC
- Facility ID: 60502
- Class: C1
- ERP: 100,000 watts
- HAAT: 191.0 meters
- Transmitter coordinates: 37°47′45″N 82°48′4″W

Links
- Public license information: Public file; LMS
- Webcast: Listen live
- Website: www.wsipfm.com

WSIP-FM (98.9 MHz) is a radio station broadcasting a New Country format. Licensed to Paintsville, Kentucky, United States. The station is currently owned by Forcht Broadcasting and features programming from Fox News Radio and Compass Media Networks. Though WSIP-AM has aired since 1949, the FM station first aired on January 20, 1965.
