= WAIN-FM =

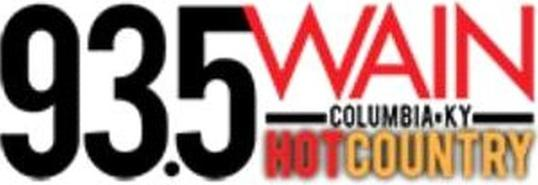
- Columbia, Kentucky; United States
- Frequency: 93.5 MHz
- Branding: Hot Country 93.5

Programming
- Format: Country
- Affiliations: ABC News Radio; Compass Media Networks; Adair County High School

Ownership
- Owner: Forcht Broadcasting; (Tri-County Radio Broadcasting Corp.)
- Sister stations: WAIN, WCKQ, WGRK-FM, WTCO

History
- First air date: 1968

Technical information
- Licensing authority: FCC
- Facility ID: 67714
- Class: A
- ERP: 4,600 watts
- HAAT: 60.6 meters (199 ft)
- Transmitter coordinates: 37°6′26″N 85°16′42″W

Links
- Public license information: Public file; LMS
- Webcast: Listen Live
- Website: www.935wain.com

WAIN-FM (93.5 MHz) is a country music–formatted radio station licensed to Columbia, Kentucky, United States. The station is currently owned by Forcht Broadcasting as part of a duopoly with sports radio station WAIN (1270 AM).

== History ==
WAIN-FM went on-the-air in 1968 as an FM counterpart to the AM station. The two were owned by Lindsey Wilson College at the time. By 1983, ownership of WAIN-AM-FM had been assumed by Key Broadcasting, now Forcht Broadcasting.

== Programming ==
WAIN-FM airs two local programs on weekday mornings: 'McKinney in the Mornings from 5:00 a.m. to 8:30 a.m., followed by Community Buzz from 8:30 a.m. to 9:00 a.m. Original programming is followed by Country with Carsen from Compass Media Networks from 9:00 a.m. to 2:00 p.m. Central. In addition to its country music programming, WAIN-FM serves as the primary home for Adair County High School athletics.
