= WDOC =

- Prestonsburg, Kentucky; United States
- Frequency: 1310 kHz
- Branding: 1310 WDOC

Programming
- Format: Southern Gospel
- Affiliations: Premiere Radio Networks, Salem Communications

Ownership
- Owner: WDOC, Inc.
- Sister stations: WQHY

Technical information
- Licensing authority: FCC
- Facility ID: 71348
- Class: D
- Power: 5,000 watts day 25 watts night
- Transmitter coordinates: 37°41′45″N 82°45′24″W

Links
- Public license information: Public file; LMS
- Webcast: Listen Live
- Website: 1310wdoc.com

WDOC (1310 AM) is a radio station broadcasting a Southern Gospel format. It is licensed to Prestonsburg, Kentucky, United States.

It is currently owned by WDOC, Inc., and features programming from Premiere Radio Networks and Salem Communications.

The radio station was previously operated by Herbert Rex Osborne, who also ran WPRT in Prestonburg.
