= WCDQ (FM) =

Radio station in Crawfordsville, Indiana

- Crawfordsville, Indiana; United States
- Frequency: 106.3 MHz

Programming
- Format: Country music

Ownership
- Owner: Forcht Broadcasting; (C.VL. Broadcasting Inc.)
- Sister stations: WCVL, WIMC

Technical information
- Licensing authority: FCC
- Facility ID: 74304
- Class: A
- ERP: 3,400 watts
- HAAT: 134 meters (440 ft)
- Transmitter coordinates: 40°3′19″N 86°55′57″W

Links
- Public license information: Public file; LMS
- Webcast: Listen live
- Website: wcdqfm.com

WCDQ (106.3 FM) is a radio station licensed to Crawfordsville, Indiana, United States. The station airs a country music format and is currently owned by C.V.L. Broadcasting, Inc. The station's call letters WCDQ were originally used by an FM station in Sanford, Maine.

== History ==
The station started as WVXI, owned by Xavier University. It was sold to Key Broadcasting of Kentucky in 2000 and was rebranded as "Hot 106.3," playing current hits.

Previous logo
