= WAIN (AM) =

Radio station in Kentucky

- Columbia, Kentucky; United States
- Frequency: 1270 kHz

Programming
- Format: Classic hits
- Affiliations: ABC News Radio; Cincinnati Reds Radio Network; Lindsey Wilson College; Adair County High School

Ownership
- Owner: Forcht Broadcasting; (Tri-County Radio Broadcasting Corp.)
- Sister stations: WAIN-FM, WCKQ, WGRK-FM, WTCO

History
- First air date: August 1, 1951

Technical information
- Licensing authority: FCC
- Facility ID: 67857
- Class: D
- Power: 1,000 watts day 68 watts night
- Transmitter coordinates: 37°6′26″N 85°16′42″W
- Translator: 101.9 W270DI (Columbia)

Links
- Public license information: Public file; LMS
- Webcast: Listen live
- Website: 1019wain.com

WAIN (1270 kHz) is a classic hits radio station licensed to Columbia, Kentucky, United States. The station is owned by Forcht Broadcasting as part of a duopoly with country music station WAIN-FM (93.5 FM). WAIN's transmitter is located along KY 206 (Liberty Road) on the east side of Columbia.

In addition to its primary AM signal, WAIN maintains an FM translator as W250CL on 101.9 MHz. That station's transmitter is co-located with the AM.

== History ==
WAIN was launched in 1951 by Tri-County Broadcasting. The station was led by S.C. Bybee, with additional ownership by Clifford Spurlock. Over the next several years, Spurlock and later Bybee would sell their stakes in the station to Lindsey Wilson College, which became majority owner of the station. This made WAIN the only commercial radio station in Kentucky where a college owned controlling interest. An FM sister station would go on air in 1968.

By 1983, the college had sold WAIN-AM-FM to Key Broadcasting, now known as Forcht Broadcasting.

Logo under the CBS Sports Radio branding

Logo under the Infinity Sports Network branding

== Programming ==
WAIN was a primary affiliate of Westwood One Sports Network, carrying the majority of its sports talk radio format until March 2026. In addition, the station is an affiliate of the Cincinnati Reds Radio Network. WAIN also carries local sports from Lindsey Wilson College and Adair County High School in conjunction with WAIN-FM.

== FM translator ==
In addition to the main station at 1270 kHz, WAIN is relayed by an FM translator at 101.9 MHz to widen its broadcast area, especially during nighttime hours when the AM signal broadcasts with only 68 watts.

Broadcast translator for WAIN
Call sign	Frequency	City of license	FID	ERP (W)	HAAT	Class	FCC info
W270DI	101.9 FM	Columbia, Kentucky	200104	250	0 m (0 ft)	D	LMS
