= WQHY =

- Prestonsburg, Kentucky; United States
- Broadcast area: Eastern Kentucky
- Frequency: 95.5 MHz
- Branding: Q95

Programming
- Format: Top 40 (CHR)
- Affiliations: ABC Radio, Westwood One

Ownership
- Owner: WDOC, Inc.
- Sister stations: WDOC

History
- Former call signs: WDOC-FM (1979–1981)

Technical information
- Licensing authority: FCC
- Facility ID: 71347
- Class: C
- ERP: 100,000 watts
- HAAT: 305.0 meters
- Transmitter coordinates: 37°41′45″N 82°45′24″W

Links
- Public license information: Public file; LMS
- Webcast: listen live
- Website: q95fm.net

WQHY (95.5 FM) is a 100,000 watt radio station broadcasting a Top 40 (CHR) format. Licensed to Prestonsburg, Kentucky, United States. The station is currently owned by Wdoc, Inc. The station is an ABC affiliate.

== History ==
The station went on the air as WDOC-FM on April 3, 1979. Then on August 7, 1981, the station changed its call sign to the current WQHY The Sweeper And Radio Jingles Says For all kinds of Radio,And For all kinds of People Q95-FM. in 1995
