= WIFE-FM =

Radio station in Rushville, Indiana

Coordinates: 39°42′22″N 85°29′41″W

- Rushville, Indiana; United States
- Frequency: 94.3 MHz
- Branding: Hometown Country

Programming
- Format: Country music

Ownership
- Owner: Rodgers Broadcasting Corporation
- Sister stations: WLPK

History
- First air date: August 5, 1971
- Former call signs: WRCR (1971–2000); WKWH-FM (2000–2007)

Technical information
- Licensing authority: FCC
- Facility ID: 54151
- Class: A
- ERP: 1,050 watts
- HAAT: 171 meters (561 ft)

Links
- Public license information: Public file; LMS
- Website: www.wifefm.com

WIFE (94.3 FM) is a radio station broadcasting a country music format. Licensed to Rushville, Indiana, the station is owned by Rodgers Broadcasting Corporation.

== History ==
WIFE first signed on the air on August 5, 1971, as WRCR, owned by the Rush County Broadcasting Company. The station's facilities were built on North Perkins Street, east of the Rushville courthouse square. A Mutual Broadcasting System affiliate, WRCR's format included an "up-tempo" mix of popular, rock, and country music in addition to local community news and Rushville Consolidated High School sports. Upon its founding, WRCR's broadcasting hours were between 5:40 a.m. and 10:15 p.m. seven days a week, but WRCR could sign off later in case of a live sporting event running long.

Before his political career as U.S. Representative for Rushville, Governor of Indiana, and Vice President of the United States, Mike Pence began his radio career on WRCR. His first show on WRCR, a weekly half-hour program called Washington Update with Mike Pence, debuted in 1988 after an unsuccessful debut run for Congress. Pence began hosting a daily three-hour call-in talk show on WRCR in 1992, The Mike Pence Show. WRCR continued to broadcast The Mike Pence Show after it began statewide syndication in 1994. The Mike Pence Show ended in September 1999 as Pence prepared for his successful run for Congress in 2000.

From 2000 to 2007, its call sign was WKWH-FM. WKWH-FM was branded "Power Country" from 2001 to 2006, and it shared call signs with a co-owned oldies station on 1520 AM, WKWH (now WSVX) licensed to nearby Shelbyville. Its branding was "94.3 Buddy FM" heading into 2007. Late in 2006, WKWH began de-emphasizing talk shows and community-oriented programming to play more country music.

On July 23, 2007, Whitewater Broadcasting took over operations of WKWH from RushShelby Energy, changed the call letters to the current WIFE-FM, and launched the current "Hometown Country 94.3" branding.
