= WCVL (AM) =

Coordinates: 40°03′56″N 86°56′01″W

- Crawfordsville, Indiana; United States
- Broadcast area: West-Central Indiana
- Frequency: 1550 kHz
- Branding: Classic Hits 92.1 FM & 1550 AM

Programming
- Format: Classic hits

Ownership
- Owner: Forcht Broadcasting; (C.V.L. Broadcasting)
- Sister stations: WCDQ, WIMC

History
- First air date: 1964

Technical information
- Licensing authority: FCC
- Facility ID: 8093
- Class: D
- Power: 250 watts day; 5 watts night
- Translator: 92.1 W221CS (Crawfordsville)

Links
- Public license information: Public file; LMS
- Webcast: Listen Live
- Website: wcvlam.com

WCVL (1550 AM) is a radio station broadcasting a classic hits format. Licensed to Crawfordsville, Indiana, the station serves the west-central region of the state and is owned by Forcht Broadcasting.
