= WAMW (AM) =

- Washington, Indiana; United States
- Broadcast area: Montgomery, Indiana, Wheatland, Indiana
- Frequency: 1580 kHz
- Branding: The General 95.9, 101.3, and AM 1580

Programming
- Format: Country
- Affiliations: Townhall News; Cincinnati Reds Radio Network

Ownership
- Owner: Dewayne Shake; (Shake Broadcasting, LLC)
- Sister stations: WAMW-FM

History
- First air date: January 1955

Technical information
- Licensing authority: FCC
- Facility ID: 25210
- Class: D
- Power: 500 watts day 5 watts night
- Transmitter coordinates: 38°38′47″N 87°16′48″W (day); 38°39′4″N 87°9′55″W (night)
- Translators: 95.9 W240CE (Washington); 101.3 W267CP (Montgomery)

Links
- Public license information: Public file; LMS
- Webcast: Listen Live
- Website: wamwamfm.com

WAMW (1580 kHz) is an AM radio station broadcasting a country music format known as "The General 95.9, 101.3, and AM 1580". It is licensed to Washington, Indiana, United States. The station is currently owned by Dewayne Shake, through licensee Shake Broadcasting, LLC. For many years, WAMW was owned by Greene Electronics, but DLC Media operated the station under a local marketing agreement from late 1999 until mid-2020. The station featured programming from ABC Radio/Citadel Media's Timeless satellite feed.

== History ==
WAMW first signed on the air in January 1955 as a daytime-only station on 1580 kHz, licensed to Washington, Indiana. Within months of its debut, the station was acquired by the owners of the local newspaper and FM station WFML (106.5 FM). WAMW and WFML operated as sister stations until the 1980s, when they split, with 106.5 FM eventually being rebranded as WWBL. In 1989, WAMW launched its own new FM sister station, WAMW-FM (107.9 MHz).

The AM transmitter facility for WAMW moved from the 106.5 site to its current location, west of downtown Washington, in 1991. The station's studios were later relocated from a downtown location to a converted former bank building on old U.S. 50 west of downtown, where it shares facilities with WAMW-FM.

For many years, WAMW was owned by Greene Electronics, but DLC Media operated the station under a Local Marketing Agreement (LMA) from late 1999 until mid-2020. During this period, the station primarily featured programming from ABC Radio/Citadel Media's Timeless satellite feed. The station is currently owned by Dewayne Shake, through licensee Shake Broadcasting, LLC.

== Programming ==
WAMW broadcasts a country music format branded as "The General 95.9, 101.3, and AM 1580", which is simulcast on two FM translators, W240CE (95.9 MHz) in Washington and W267CP (101.3 MHz) in Montgomery. The current country format launched in March 2011.

The station is affiliated with CBS News Radio and has a long-standing affiliation with Brownfield Ag News.

Sports WAMW is a major sports affiliate in the area. It is a part of the Cincinnati Reds Radio Network, carrying all games for the Major League Baseball team. The station also provides extensive local high school sports coverage for the Washington Hatchet and Barr-Reeve Viking teams.

1580 AM is a Canadian clear-channel frequency.

Logo before 101.3 translator sign on
