= WLPK =

Coordinates: 39°38′15″N 85°08′45″W

- Connersville, Indiana; United States
- Frequency: 1580 kHz
- Branding: K Mix 106.9

Programming
- Format: Classic hits

Ownership
- Owner: Duncan Media
- Sister stations: WIFE-FM

History
- First air date: 1948
- Former call signs: WIFE (1983–1994); WCNB (1994–2006); WIFE (2006–2013)

Technical information
- Licensing authority: FCC
- Facility ID: 57352
- Class: D
- Power: 250 watts day; 5 watts night
- Translator: 106.9 W295BT (Connersville)

Links
- Public license information: Public file; LMS
- Webcast: Listen live
- Website: kmix1069.com

WLPK (1580 AM) is a radio station broadcasting a classic hits format. Licensed to Connersville, Indiana, the station is owned by Rodgers Broadcasting Corporation.

== History ==
The station began broadcasting April 4, 1948, as WCNB. It was owned by The News-Examiner Company, publisher of the Connersville News-Examiner. Studios were on the second floor of the News-Examiner Building, 406 Central Avenue in Connersville.

On March 17, 2014, WLPK changed its format from oldies to classic hits, branded as "K Mix 106.9" (the frequency in the branding is for FM translator W295BT 106.9 FM in Connersville).
