= WPGW-FM =

- Portland, Indiana; United States
- Frequency: 100.9 MHz
- Branding: J-Country 101

Programming
- Format: Country

Ownership
- Owner: Wpgw, Inc.
- Sister stations: WPGW (AM)

History
- First air date: May 19, 1975
- Call sign meaning: Portland-Glenn West

Technical information
- Licensing authority: FCC
- Facility ID: 73878
- Class: A
- ERP: 4,600 watts
- HAAT: 55 meters
- Transmitter coordinates: 40°26′10.00″N 85°0′54.00″W

Links
- Public license information: Public file; LMS
- Webcast: Listen Live
- Website: wpgwradio.com

WPGW-FM (100.9 FM) is a radio station licensed to Portland, Indiana, in the United States It broadcasts a country music format and is owned by WPGW, Inc.

== History ==
WPGW (AM) was founded in 1951. WPGW-FM was granted as a construction permit by the Federal Communications Commission (FCC) in 1973. WPGW-FM went on the air on May 19, 1975. Both stations are owned and operated by the licensee WPGW Inc. A country music format was adopted in 1980.
