= WFTM-FM =

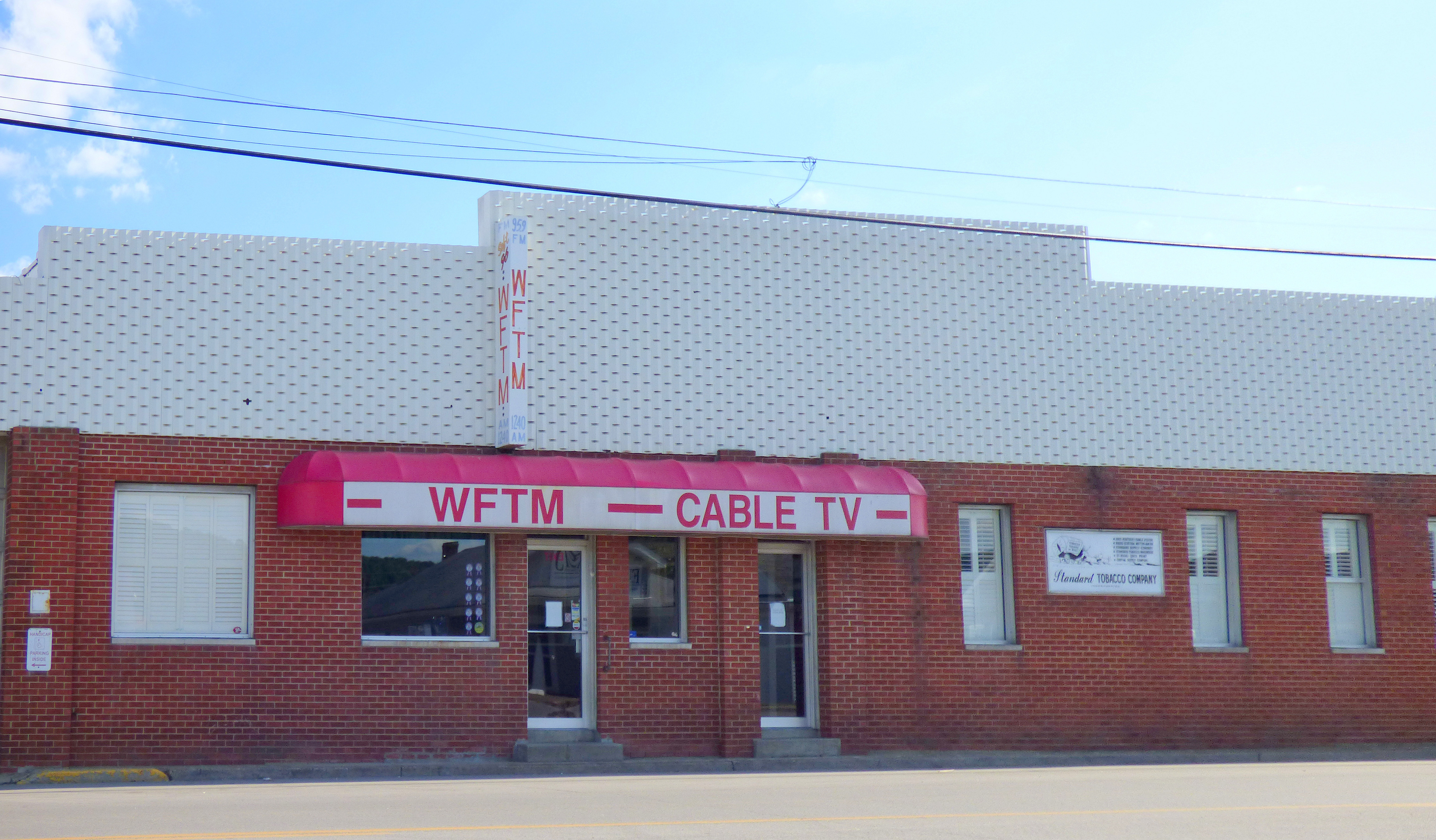
- Studio located at 626 Forest Avenue
- Maysville, Kentucky; United States
- Frequency: 95.9 MHz
- Branding: Soft 96

Programming
- Format: Soft adult contemporary; Adult contemporary

Ownership
- Owner: Standard Tobacco Company, Inc.
- Sister stations: WTIM

History
- First air date: 1965
- Call sign meaning: World's Finest Tobacco Market

Technical information
- Licensing authority: FCC
- Facility ID: 62216
- Class: A
- ERP: 3,000 watts
- HAAT: 94 meters (308 ft)
- Transmitter coordinates: 38°38′35″N 83°46′47″W

Links
- Public license information: Public file; LMS
- Webcast: Listen live
- Website: wftm.net

WFTM-FM (95.9 FM) is a commercial radio station broadcasting a mix of soft adult contemporary and adult contemporary formats. Licensed to Maysville, Kentucky, United States, the station is currently owned by Standard Tobacco Company, Inc. and features programming from Jones Radio Network.
