= WNDI (AM) =

WNDI and WNDI-FM

Sullivan, Indiana; United States
- Frequencies: WNDI: 1550 kHz; WNDI-FM: 95.3 MHz
- Branding: WNDI 1550 AM & 95.3 FM

Programming
- Format: Country music

Ownership
- Owner: JTM Broadcasting Corporation

History
- First air date: WNDI: August 5, 1964; WNDI-FM: August 10, 1982
- Former call signs: WNDI: WKQV (1964–1971)

Technical information
- Licensing authority: FCC
- Facility ID: WNDI: 2394; WNDI-FM: 2395
- Class: WNDI: D; WNDI-FM: A
- Power: WNDI: 250 watts (daytime)
- ERP: WNDI-FM: 6,000 watts
- HAAT: WNDI-FM: 100 meters (330 ft)
- Transmitter coordinates: WNDI: 39°4′32.0″N 87°23′57.0″W; WNDI-FM: 39°9′36.1″N 87°32′32.1″W

Links
- Public license information: WNDI: Public file; LMS; WNDI-FM: Public file; LMS

WNDI (AM) & WNDI-FM are simulcasting radio stations broadcasting on the frequencies of 1550 kilohertz and 95.3 megahertz. WNDI AM&FM are owned by the JTM Broadcasting Corporation.

The format is Country music and the stations are located in the city of Sullivan, Indiana.
