= WKLB (AM) =

Radio station in Manchester, Kentucky, United States

- Manchester, Kentucky; United States
- Frequency: 1290 kHz
- Branding: "The Double Shot"

Programming
- Format: Rock & roll, country and contemporary Christian music
- Affiliations: Kentucky News Network

Ownership
- Owner: Robert Rodgers and Curt Davis; (Sonshine Broadcasting Company, Ltd.)

History
- First air date: 1980

Technical information
- Licensing authority: FCC
- Facility ID: 3964
- Class: D
- Power: 5,000 watts day; 34 watts night
- HAAT: 202.3 meters (664 ft)
- Transmitter coordinates: 37°8′15.3″N 83°46′49.7″W
- Repeater: 104.5 W283AH (Manchester)

Links
- Public license information: Public file; LMS

WKLB (1290 AM and 104.5 FM) is a radio station broadcasting a rock & roll, country and contemporary Christian format. It is licensed to Manchester, Kentucky, United States. The station is owned by Robert Rodgers and Curt Davis, through licensee Sonshine Broadcasting Company, Ltd., and features programming from Fox News Radio and the Kentucky News Network.

In 1983 WKLB received approval from the Federal Communications Commission (FCC) to increase its power to 5000 watts, making it one of the most powerful AM radio stations in the Kentucky Mountains. Its 5000 watt signal covers a good portion of the Kentucky Mountains. The station's range reaches as far east as Knott County, Kentucky, as far west as Somerset, Kentucky, as far north as the Bert T. Combs Mountain Parkway in Campton, Kentucky, and as far south as Jellico, Tennessee, on Interstate 75.

The station has broadcast Clay County High School football, and boys' and girls' basketball games since first going on the air in 1980. WKLB 1290/104.5 has exclusive rights to the University of Kentucky football and men's and women's basketball via contract with IMG.

The original founder of WKLB was Larry and Lynda Barker of Barker Broadcasting. WKLB is named after its founders. WKLB remained country in format with a popular morning talk show The SwapShop featuring host “Cornbread” from 1980 until it was sold in 2015.
