= WSIP (AM) =

- Paintsville, Kentucky; United States
- Frequency: 1490 kHz
- Branding: "Classic Country 1490 WSIP"

Programming
- Format: Classic country
- Affiliations: Fox News Radio

Ownership
- Owner: Forcht Broadcasting; (S.I.P. Broadcasting Company, Inc.)

History
- First air date: April 4, 1949

Technical information
- Licensing authority: FCC
- Facility ID: 58403
- Class: C
- Power: 1,000 watts unlimited
- Transmitter coordinates: 37°48′21″N 82°46′01″W

Links
- Public license information: Public file; LMS
- Webcast: Listen Live
- Website: wsipam.com

WSIP (1490 kHz) is a classic country AM radio station licensed to Paintsville, Kentucky, United States. The station is currently owned by Forcht Broadcasting and features programming from Fox News Radio. The station first aired on April 4, 1949. The station also broadcasts online via Official Stream Page, on Apple and Android mobile devices, and has an Alexa skill.

Previous logo

The station flipped to classic country on February 1, 2026, after airing a sports format from 2018 until January 31, 2026. Prior to 2018, the station aired a Classic Hits format, which was moved to sister station WKYH.
