= WFLE (AM) =

- Flemingsburg, Kentucky; United States
- Frequency: 1060 kHz

Programming
- Format: Country

Ownership
- Owner: Dreamcatcher Communications, Inc.

Technical information
- Facility ID: 21717
- Class: D
- Power: 500 watts day
- Transmitter coordinates: 38°27′01″N 83°44′06″W

WFLE (1060 AM) was a Flemingsburg, Kentucky, United States, radio station broadcasting a country music format. It was first licensed in 1981.

Dreamcatcher Communications, Inc. surrendered the station's license to the Federal Communications Commission for cancellation on May 27, 2020, and the FCC cancelled the license on May 28.
