= WFTM (AM) =

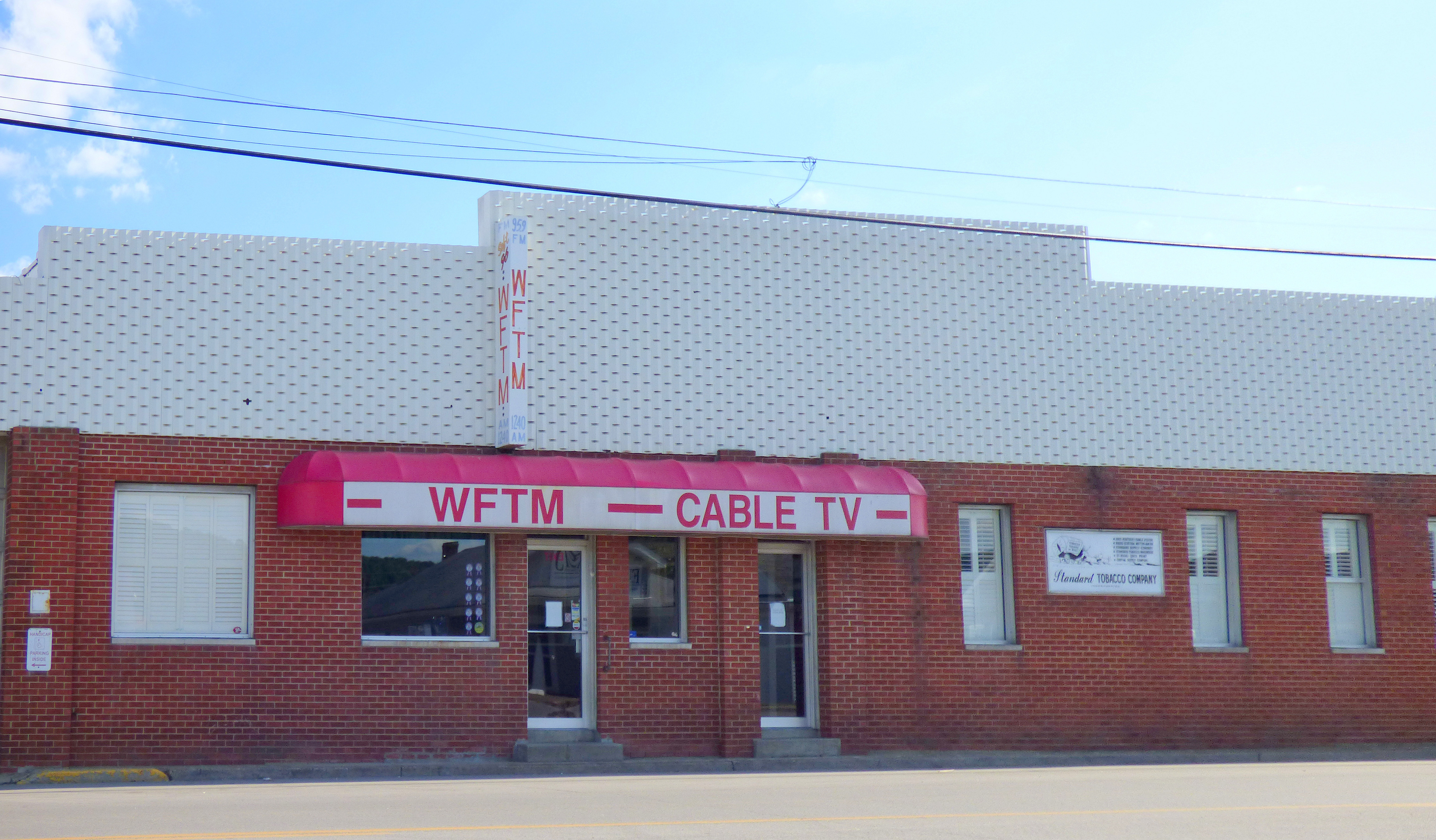
- Studio located at 626 Forest Avenue
- Maysville, Kentucky; United States
- Frequency: 1240 kHz
- Branding: 1240 Sports

Programming
- Format: Sports
- Affiliations: Infinity Sports Network

Ownership
- Owner: Standard Tobacco Co.
- Sister stations: WTIM-FM

History
- First air date: 1948
- Call sign meaning: World's Finest Tobacco Market

Technical information
- Licensing authority: FCC
- Facility ID: 62215
- Class: C
- Power: 1,000 watts (unlimited)
- Transmitter coordinates: 38°38′10″N 83°45′38″W

Links
- Public license information: Public file; LMS
- Webcast: Listen live
- Website: wftm.net

WFTM (1240 AM) is a commercial radio station licensed to Maysville, Kentucky, United States, broadcasting a sports format. The station is currently owned by Standard Tobacco Co.

WFTM is an affiliate of Westwood One Sports. Previously WFTM was an affiliate of Westwood One's Kool Gold satellite-delivered format featuring mainly hits of the 1960s and 1970s. Before that, the station aired an adult standards format.
