= WFTG =

- London, Kentucky; United States
- Frequency: 1400 kHz
- Branding: The Wolf 1400 AM 106.9 FM

Programming
- Format: Classic country
- Affiliations: Fox News Radio; Cincinnati Reds Radio Network

Ownership
- Owner: Forcht Broadcasting

History
- First air date: 1955

Technical information
- Licensing authority: FCC
- Facility ID: 20412
- Class: C
- Power: 690 watts
- Transmitter coordinates: 37°8′30″N 84°4′45″W

Links
- Public license information: Public file; LMS
- Website: www.wftgam.com

WFTG (1400 AM) is a radio station licensed to London, Kentucky, United States. The station is currently owned by Forcht Broadcasting, Inc and airs a classic country format.

The station airs Fox News updates at the top of the hour, as well as the complete slate of Cincinnati Reds baseball games.

== FM Translator ==
In addition to the main station on 1400 kHz, WFTG is relayed to an FM translator on 106.9 MHz in order to provide higher quality sound and to also widen the coverage area.

Call sign	Frequency	City of license	FID	ERP (W)	Class	FCC info
W295CC	106.9 FM	London, Kentucky	144025	160	D	LMS
