= Columbia, Kentucky =

- City
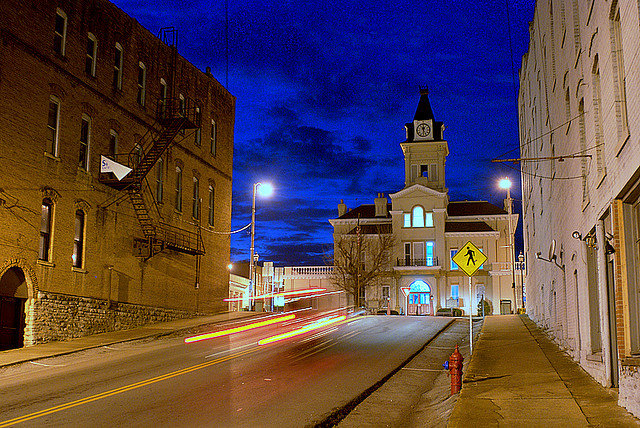
- Adair County Courthouse

- Logo
- Motto: "The Gem of Kentucky"
- Location of Columbia in Adair County, Kentucky.
- Coordinates: 37°6′2″N 85°18′22″W
- Country: United States
- State: Kentucky
- County: Adair

Government
  - Type: Mayor-Council
  - Mayor: Pamela Hoots
  - City Attorney: Mike Harris
  - Governing body: Columbia City Council

Area
  - Total: 4.91 sq mi (12.72 km^{2})
  - Land: 4.87 sq mi (12.62 km^{2})
  - Water: 0.039 sq mi (0.10 km^{2})
- Elevation: 748 ft (228 m)

Population (2020)
  - Total: 4,845
  - Estimate (2024): 4,685
  - Density: 994.4/sq mi (383.94/km^{2})
- Time zone: UTC-6 (Central (CST))
  - Summer (DST): UTC-5 (CDT)
- ZIP codes: 42715, 42728, 42735
- Area codes: 270 & 364
- FIPS code: 21-16750
- GNIS feature ID: 0489885
- Website: www.cityofcolumbiaky.com

Columbia is a home rule-class city just above Russell Creek in Adair County, Kentucky, United States. The population was 4,845 at the 2020 census. Columbia is the seat of its county.

== History ==
The area was settled c. 1802 by Daniel Trabue. The post office was opened on April 1, 1806, by John Field, who also ran the local store.

Camp Boyle, located north of the town square, was an important camp and muster site for the Union Army during the Civil War (1861–1865). The 13th Kentucky Cavalry Regiment (Union) was organized in Columbia.

== Geography ==
According to the United States Census Bureau, the city has a total area of 3.4 square miles (8.9 km^{2}), all land.

== Demographics ==
Historical population
Census	Pop.	Note	%±
1810	175		—
1830	423		—
1840	486		14.9%
1860	381		—
1870	506		32.8%
1880	549		8.5%
1900	654		—
1910	1,022		56.3%
1920	1,076		5.3%
1930	1,195		11.1%
1940	1,372		14.8%
1950	2,167		57.9%
1960	2,255		4.1%
1970	3,234		43.4%
1980	3,710		14.7%
1990	3,845		3.6%
2000	4,014		4.4%
2010	4,452		10.9%
2020	4,845		8.8%
2024 (est.)	4,685		−3.3%
U.S. Decennial Census

=== 2020 census ===
As of the 2020 census, Columbia had a population of 4,845. The median age was 30.2 years. 17.5% of residents were under the age of 18 and 16.6% of residents were 65 years of age or older. For every 100 females there were 92.6 males, and for every 100 females age 18 and over there were 87.0 males age 18 and over.

94.0% of residents lived in urban areas, while 6.0% lived in rural areas.

There were 1,689 households in Columbia, of which 26.8% had children under the age of 18 living in them. Of all households, 32.8% were married-couple households, 20.8% were households with a male householder and no spouse or partner present, and 37.2% were households with a female householder and no spouse or partner present. About 38.5% of all households were made up of individuals and 16.7% had someone living alone who was 65 years of age or older.

There were 1,916 housing units, of which 11.8% were vacant. The homeowner vacancy rate was 3.0% and the rental vacancy rate was 7.7%.

Racial composition as of the 2020 census
Race	Number	Percent
White	4,110	84.8%
Black or African American	359	7.4%
American Indian and Alaska Native	6	0.1%
Asian	39	0.8%
Native Hawaiian and Other Pacific Islander	3	0.1%
Some other race	132	2.7%
Two or more races	196	4.0%
Hispanic or Latino (of any race)	261	5.4%

=== 2000 census ===
As of the 2000 census, there were 4,014 people, 1,554 households, and 893 families residing in the city. The population density was 1,167.9 per square mile (450.9/km^{2}). There were 1,789 housing units at an average density of 520.5 per square mile (201.0/km^{2}). The racial makeup of the city was 88.77% White, 7.68% African American, 0.25% Native American, 0.52% Asian, 0.07% Pacific Islander, 0.20% from other races, and 1.64% from two or more races. Hispanic or Latino of any race were 1.93% of the population. Some other race alone 1.08%

There were 1,554 households, out of which 24.8% had children under the age of 18 living with them, 39.9% were married couples living together, 14.5% had a female householder with no husband present, and 42.5% were non-families. 40.3% of all households were made up of individuals living alone, and 22.1% had someone living alone who was 65 years of age or older. The average household size was 2.12 and the average family size was 2.84.

In the city, the population was spread out, with 18.0% under the age of 18, 19.1% from 20 to 24, 23.1% from 25 to 44, 19.1% from 45 to 64, and 20.6% who were 65 years of age or older. The median age was 36 years. For every 100 females, there were 83.8 males. For every 100 females age 18 and over, there were 78.6 males.

The median income for a household in the city was $22,861, and the median income for a family was $31,344. Males had a median income of $23,906 versus $21,000 for females. The per capita income for the city was $17,836. About 19.9% of families and 26.6% of the population were below the poverty line, including 39.4% of those under age 18 and 17.9% of those age 65 or over.

== Arts and culture ==
=== Events ===
Events held in Columbia, Kentucky:

- Downtown Days, two-day festival on the streets of downtown Columbia. The event includes a parade, a beauty pageant, reenactment of the James/Younger Bank of Columbia robbery, 5-K run, pet show, train rides for the kids, kids carnival, face painting, inflatables, live entertainment, food, fun, clowns, choirs, and more.
- Columbia Nights, a nearly monthly shopping event held in downtown Columbia. All businesses downtown stay open until 9 P.M. and usually offer discounted prices on their merchandise.

== Education ==
=== Public schools ===
Columbia Public Schools are part of the Adair County Schools School District. Schools in the district include:

- Adair County Elementary School (3rd, 4th, 5th Grade Students from County)
- Adair County Primary School ( Pre-School, Kindergarten, 1st,& 2nd Grade Students from County)
- Adair County Middle School (6th, 7th, & 8th Grade Students)
- Adair County High School (9th-12 Grade Students)

=== Colleges and universities ===
Lindsey Wilson University, a private, United Methodist-related university, offers in-person and online degree programs at the associate, bachelor's, master's, and doctoral levels

=== Public library ===
Columbia has a lending library, the Adair County Public Library.

== Media ==
Media in Columbia include:

- The Adair Progress, a local once weekly newspaper
- WAIN (AM), a sports radio station
- WAIN-FM, a country radio station
- Adair County Community Voice, a local once weekly newspaper complete with Public Records information
- Columbia Magazine, an online-only magazine updated daily with local news and history.
- Green River Media, a digital-only news website launched in August 2025

== Infrastructure ==
The Cumberland Expressway runs through Columbia as it extends from Bowling Green to Somerset. This parkway is a future spur road of Interstate 65. The addition of an interchange with a 2006 reconstruction of Highway 61 South, Columbia now has two exits on the Parkway.

Exit 49, the original exit on the parkway, merges onto Highway 55 South (also known as Jamestown Street) bringing drivers through the middle of Columbia.

Exit 47, the new exit, merges onto Highway 61 South (also known as Burkesville Street/Road) and drivers can choose to go north or go to Burkesville to the south.

The Highway 55 Bypass was officially opened on October 7, 2008, for more information see below.

=== Columbia Bypass ===
After years of promises by various governors and other Kentucky officials, construction began early in May 2007, which culminated in an official ground-breaking ceremony by the former Governor himself on May 15, 2007 near the front of the newly constructed Adair County Elementary School, which faces the direction of the bypass.

The Columbia Bypass was opened to the public on October 7, 2008, featuring a traffic light at the intersection of the bypass and North 55 as well as a traffic light at the intersection of South 61. The bypass has relieved a majority of the downtown traffic.

== Notable people ==
- Walter Arnold Baker – state legislator and Kentucky Supreme Court justice
- Steve Hamilton – Major League Baseball pitcher (1935–1997)
- Vernie McGaha – Kentucky state senator from Adair County since 1997
- Marine Sergeant Dakota Meyer – In September 2011, he received the Medal of Honor from President Barack Obama at age 23; he saved numerous American and Afghan troops during a Taliban ambush and is the third living recipient of the honor (and first living Marine) from the Iraq and Afghan wars
- Doug Moseley – United Methodist clergyman and a member of the Kentucky State Senate from 1974 to 1987; former Columbia resident
- Frank Lane Wolford – U.S. Congressman (1883–1887)
- James Alexander Williamson – American Civil War Brevet Major General and Medal of Honor recipient
- Lance Burton – American stage magician

== In popular culture ==
Columbia, Kentucky was depicted in the film Resurrection Mary starring Wilford Brimley in 2002. The film was directed by another Columbia native, Matthew Arnold (director) as part of the USC School of Cinematic Arts graduate thesis program and won awards at the Big Bear Lake International Film Festival. The filming was featured on local news stations and in USA Today.
