= Forcht Group of Kentucky =

American conglomerate

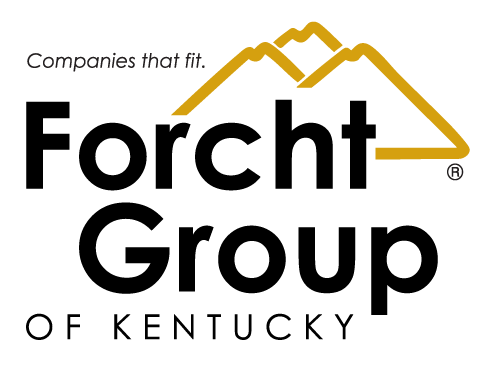
- Type: Management Services Company
- Industry: Banking and financial services, insurance, nursing homes and health care, broadcasting and print media, retail, data and Web design services, real estate, construction
- Founded: Nursing home group-1972; Broadcasting group-1981; Banking group-1985
- Headquarters: Lexington, Kentucky and Corbin, Kentucky, United States
- Key people: Terry Forcht, President & CEO, Debbie Reynolds, Chief Operations Officer, Roger Alsip, Chief Financial Officer, Ted Forcht, Rodney Shockley Directors, Corporate Board
- Total assets: $1.012 billion USD (2008) (Banking division only)
- Number of employees: 2,100 (2008)
- Website: http://www.forchtgroup.com/

Forcht Group of Kentucky is a group of companies principally owned by Terry Forcht, with corporate headquarters in Lexington, Kentucky and Corbin, Kentucky. The corporation employs more than 2,100 people in many companies specializing in banking and financial services, insurance, nursing homes and health care, broadcasting and print media, retail, data and Web design services, real estate and construction. Forcht Group of Kentucky officially changed its name from First Corbin Financial Corporation on November 10, 2007. The company also sponsors "The Forcht Group of Kentucky Center for Excellence in Leadership" lecture series which began in 2005 at University of the Cumberlands, where Terry Forcht formerly taught business.

== Forcht Bank ==
The largest of Forcht Group's businesses is Forcht Bancorp, which is a management services company for Forcht Bank which has 34 locations in 12 Kentucky counties with total assets of more than $1 billion ranking it among the top 10 Kentucky-based banks in the Commonwealth. In December 2007, Forcht Bank was formed by merging the 11 banks that Forcht Bancorp owned. The bank's locations were formerly named Boone National Bank, Campbellsville National Bank, Deposit Bank and Trust Co., First National Bank of Lexington, Laurel National Bank, PRP National Bank, Somerset National Bank, Tri-County National Bank, Williamsburg National Bank, and Eagle Bank. Forcht Bank is based in Lexington, and Forcht Bancorp's headquarters is in Corbin and Lexington. The bank's slogan is "A New Direction in Banking." Forcht Bank is the title sponsor for the State Baseball Championship tournament at Applebee's Park in Lexington, Ky.

== Forcht Broadcasting ==
On April 23, 2008, Forcht Group of Kentucky announced that Key Broadcasting had been rebranded as Forcht Broadcasting. Forcht Broadcasting currently operates 24 radio stations across 12 areas in Illinois, Indiana and Kentucky. Forcht Broadcasting stations are affiliates for a variety of pro, college and local sports, including the UK Sports Network, NASCAR, IndyCar, Cincinnati Reds, St. Louis Cardinals, Nashville Predators, Cincinnati Bengals, Indianapolis Colts and local high school sports.

== List of companies ==
=== Banking and financial services ===
- Forcht Bancorp, which operates 34 banking centers in 12 counties with total assets of more than a billion dollars.
- First Corbin Bank Services, Inc.
- First Financial Appraisals, Inc.
- First Leasing, LLC
- Columbia Bancshares, Inc.*
- 1st Hamburg, LLC
- First Financial Credit, Inc.
- Key Motor Club, LLC
- First Corbin Hedge Fund, LLC

=== Health care ===
- Parkway Realty, Inc.
- Forcht Pharmacy
- Forcht Diagnostic Laboratory
- Management Advisors, Inc.
- Health Realty, LLC
- Barbourville Realty, LLC
- Harlan Realty, LLC
- Williamsburg Realty, LLC
- Bacon Creek Realty, LLC
- Hazard Realty, LLC
- Knott County Realty, LLC
- Wolfe County Realty, LLC
- Hyden Nursing Home Realty, LLC

=== Broadcast and print media ===
- 1st Media, LLC
- Forcht Broadcasting, Inc.
  - Key Management, Inc.
  - Tri-County Radio Broadcasting, Inc.
  - S.I.P Broadcasting, Inc.
  - T.C.W. Broadcasting, Inc.
  - C.V.L. Broadcasting, Inc.
  - V.L.N. Broadcasting, Inc.
  - F.T.G. Broadcasting, Inc.
  - P.R.S. Broadcasting, Inc.
  - H.O.P. Broadcasting, Inc.
  - HOP Realty, LLC
  - SIP Realty, LLC
  - FTG Realty, LLC
- The Whitley Whiz, Inc., which publishes the Corbin and Williamsburg News Journal
- The Hamburg Home Journal, LLC

=== Insurance ===
- Kentucky National Insurance Company
- Forcht Insurance Agency, LLC
- Hamburg Insurance, LLC
- Corbin Insurance, LLC
- First Kentucky Insurance, LLC
- Kentucky Home Life Insurance

=== Retail ===
- My Favorite Things, LLC
- First Jewelry and Gifts, Inc.

=== Technology ===
- Key Technology, LLC
- Input Data, LLC
- BSC Data, LLC

=== Service group ===
- Forcht Construction, LLC
- First Construction Landscaping, LLC
- Terry E. Forcht S/P
- Key Association S/P
- Key Management S/P
- First Corbin Investment S/P
- First Corbin Financial.com, Inc.

=== Real estate ===
- First Corbin, LLC
- Second Corbin, LLC
- Old Rosebud, LLC
- Billy Town Realty, LLC
- First Corbin Realty, LLC
- Forrest Hills, LLC
- Land Company of Columbia, Inc.
- Forcht Investment S/P
- Land Company of Corbin, Inc.
- I.P. Realty, LLC
- Queen Hill, LLC
- Land Company of Danville, Inc.
- MA Realty, LLC
- Radio IAI, LLC
- Duke Publishing, LLC
- First Air, LLC
- Huff, Farmer and Forcht PTR*
- Huff & Associates, LLC*
- Forcht & Patrick PTR*
- Forcht, Patrick & Frazier PTR*

*Minority ownership
