= WCYN-FM =

Cynthiana, Kentucky; United States
- Broadcast area: Lexington metropolitan area
- Frequency: 102.3 MHz
- Branding: 101.5 JACK FM

Programming
- Format: Defunct (was Adult hits (WLXX simulcast))

Ownership
- Owner: Cumulus Media; (Cumulus Licensing LLC)
- Sister stations: WLTO, WLXX, WXZZ, WVLK-FM, WVLK

History
- First air date: 1970
- Last air date: May 2022
- Call sign meaning: W CYNthiana (city of license)

Technical information
- Licensing authority: FCC
- Facility ID: 71308
- Class: A
- ERP: 3,400 watts
- HAAT: 122 meters (400 ft)
- Transmitter coordinates: 38°24′39″N 84°19′7″W

Links
- Public license information: Public file; LMS
- Webcast: Listen live
- Website: 1015jackfm.com

WCYN-FM (102.3 MHz) was a commercial FM radio station licensed to Cynthiana, Kentucky, and serving the Lexington metropolitan area. The station simulcast co-owned 101.5 WLXX in Richmond, Kentucky. WCYN-FM and WLXX played adult hits using the syndicated JACK-FM radio format. WCYN-FM was last owned by Cumulus Media. The studios and offices were in Kincaid Towers on Vine Street in Lexington.

The station was co-owned with WCYN (AM) until 2002, when the station was transferred to Cumulus Media. WCYN-FM was silent from March 7, 2017, to sometime in 2019, due to the lack of an exciter. It returned to the air, simulcasting sister station WLXX, using the slogan "Playing What We Want!" The playlist was mostly rock hits from the 1980s, 90s and early 2000s, but included pop and novelty hits from the last 50 years. Unlike most music stations, WCYN-FM, along with WLXX, did not have DJs, but used the prerecorded voice of Howard Cogan to make humorous and sometimes sarcastic quips. The station's final Program Director was Patrick Scott.

WCYN's license was surrendered to the Federal Communications Commission and cancelled on May 19, 2022.
