= WBON-LD =

Television station in Richmond, Kentucky

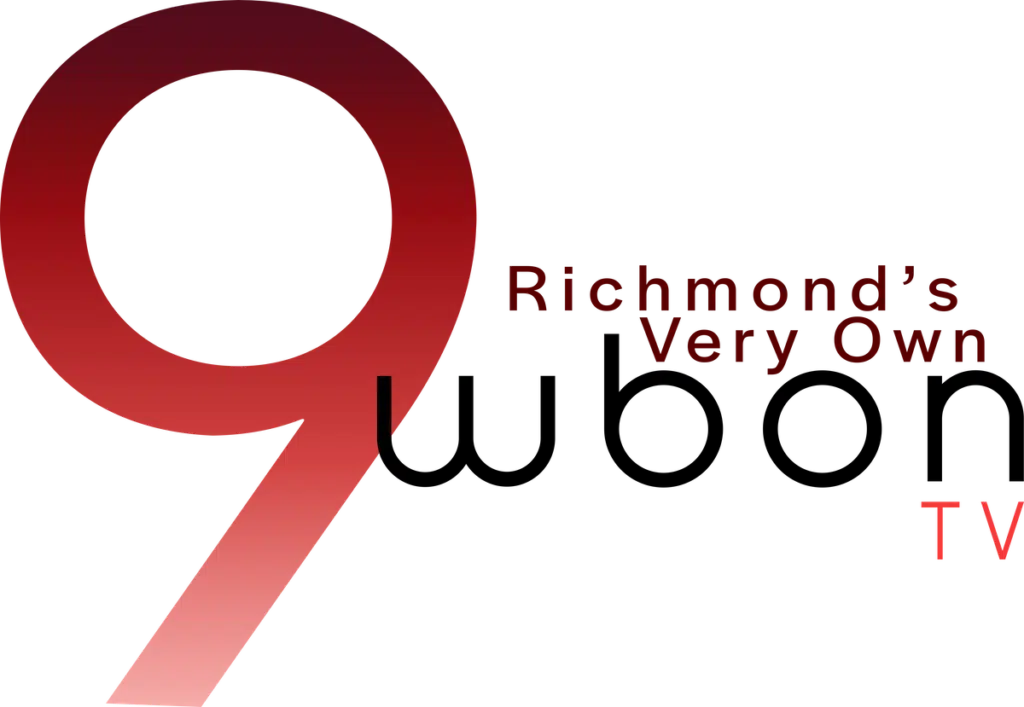
- Richmond–Lexington, Kentucky; United States
- Channels: Digital: 9 (VHF); Virtual: 9
- Branding: WBON-TV

Programming
- Affiliations: 9.1: Independent; for others, see § Subchannels

Ownership
- Owner: Wallingford Broadcasting Co., Inc.

History
- First air date: November 29, 1993
- Former call signs: W09BZ (1991–2000); WOBZ-LP (2000–2010); WOBZ-LD (2010–2019)
- Former channel numbers: Analog: 9 (VHF, 1993–2010)
- Former affiliations: America One (1993–2010); Access TV; Retro TV (2006–2016); Buzzr (2015–2020); TBN (secondary, 1993–200?); UATV (secondary, 2001–2006); America's Store (199?–2010); Jewelry TV (secondary, 2010–2016)
- Call sign meaning: Wallingford Broadcasting On (TV)

Technical information
- Licensing authority: FCC
- Facility ID: 2231
- Class: LD
- ERP: 3 kW
- HAAT: 143.9 m (472 ft)
- Transmitter coordinates: 37°39′35.9″N 84°8′59.7″W

Links
- Public license information: LMS
- Website: wbontv.com

WBON-LD (channel 9) is a low-power independent television station licensed to Richmond, Kentucky, United States, serving the Lexington area. The station is owned by Wallingford Broadcasting, Inc. WBON-LD's studio facility is located on Big Hill Avenue in Richmond, and its transmitter is located near Waco, Kentucky, on a tower shared with co-owned FM radio stations WCYO and WLFX.

== History ==
=== Early days in London ===
Originally licensed in East Bernstadt, Kentucky (located near London) at first issuance of the station's construction permit in 1991 as W09BZ, the station began broadcasting on November 29, 1993, as an America One affiliate, but also providing programming from the Trinity Broadcasting Network on a secondary basis. For its first 20+ years on the air, the station was owned by Andrea and Joey Kesler, the latter of which was a former weatherman and sportscaster at Hazard–based NBC WKYH-TV (channel 57, now CBS affiliate and WKYT-TV semi-satellite WYMT-TV) in the 1980s.

The station's callsign was changed to WOBZ-LP in 2000. The station then became affiliated with Urban America Television in 2001, and stayed with that network until that network closed in 2006. In 2006, the station switched to the Retro Television Network as its affiliated network, but also launched a second subchannel to carry Frost Great Outdoors network programming. The station's third subchannel aired programming from Luken Communications–owned Tuff TV beginning in the early 2010s, along with Jewelry Television programming during the overnight hours. Upon the station's conversion to digital in 2010, the station replaced the "-LP" suffix in its callsign with "-LD" to become WOBZ-LD.

=== Tower collapse ===
On January 29, 2008, the tower used by WOBZ-LP and radio station WJJA-LP collapsed during a storm. The station continued to be seen on London cable and over the internet. Station management hoped to build a new tower by April of that year, which they did.

=== New affiliation and ownership ===
In 2016, the station's main digital subchannel became an affiliate of Buzzr, featuring FremantleMedia's classic game show library. In 2018, the station was sold to its current owner, Wallingford Broadcasting.

=== Relocation to Richmond ===
Under new ownership, the station applied with the FCC to relocate its studio and transmission facilities to Richmond in early 2019. It was granted a construction permit in February 2019 to relocate, as well as to upgrade its signal power to 3,000 watts. On July 11 of the same year, the station's callsign changed to the current WBON-LD. The move was completed in April 2020, and the station now operates under full license to cover from Richmond as WBON-LD.

Even after the relocation and renaming, the WOBZ YouTube channel, which was launched in March 2012, can still be accessed in the present day.

== Locally-based programming ==
WBON-LD currently provides local programming, including KHSAA-sanctioned high school football and basketball games, a daily local newscast called Live at Five among other locally produced and seasonal programming, and some syndicated programming, some of which is compliant with the FCC's children's television programming requirements.

In the 2000s as WOBZ-LP/LD, the station was the southeastern Kentucky home to Ohio Valley Wrestling originating from WBKI-TV in Louisville.

== Subchannels ==
The station's signal is multiplexed:

Subchannels of WBON-LD
Subchannel	Res.	Short name	Programming
9.1	720p	WBON-TV	Independent
9.2	480i	BUZZR	Buzzr
9.3	480i		MovieSphere Gold
9.4	480i	HrtLand	Heartland
9.5	480i	RETRO	Retro TV
