= WBUL-FM =

Radio station in Lexington, Kentucky

Coordinates: 38.035°N 84.450°W

- Lexington, Kentucky; United States
- Broadcast area: Lexington Metro area Central Kentucky
- Frequency: 98.1 MHz (HD Radio)
- Branding: 98.1 The Bull

Programming
- Format: Country
- Subchannels: HD2: 98.5 Icons (Classic country)
- Affiliations: Premiere Networks

Ownership
- Owner: iHeartMedia, Inc.; (iHM Licenses, LLC)
- Sister stations: WKQQ, WLAP, WLKT, WMXL, WWTF

History
- First air date: July 15, 1969
- Former call signs: WLEX-FM (1968–1972); WLEX (1972–1974); WKQQ (1974–1998)
- Call sign meaning: "Bull"

Technical information
- Licensing authority: FCC
- Facility ID: 70192
- Class: C1
- ERP: 100,000 watts
- HAAT: 171 meters (561 ft)
- Translator: HD2: 98.5 W253BK (Winchester)

Links
- Public license information: Public file; LMS
- Webcast: Listen Live; Listen Live (HD2)
- Website: wbul.iheart.com 981thebullicons.iheart.com (HD2)

WBUL-FM (98.1 MHz) is one of four country music radio stations serving the Lexington, Kentucky radio market. The station broadcasts with an ERP of 100,000 watts, with a nearly 100-mile broadcasting radius. The station is heard as far south as London, as far east as Grayson, as far north as Cincinnati and as far west as Louisville. iHeartMedia, Inc. currently owns the station. WBUL-FM was the third station to begin broadcasting HD Radio in Lexington after WUKY and WKQQ.

former logo

The station serves as the FM flagship of the UK Sports Network, airing Kentucky Wildcats football and men's basketball to make up for shortfalls in coverage by AM flagship and sister station WLAP.

== History ==
=== WLEX-FM and WKQQ ===
On April 19, 1966, the Federal Communications Commission issued a construction permit to WLEX-TV, Inc., to build a new FM radio station in Lexington. WLEX-FM began broadcasting July 15, 1969, as a stereo rock music station reliant on automated taped programming. After five years of operation, the television station opted to sell the FM outlet owing to persistent equipment issues. It was purchased by Village Communications, which simultaneously acquired WBLG (1300 AM), and was relaunched with a new rock format as WKQQ on December 1, 1974. In 1979, Village sold off WBLG—which had been less successful for the company than WKQQ—to raise capital for cable television ventures, and the station upgraded in power from 50,000 to 100,000 watts. At this time, the station began a run of success in the Lexington market. It posted double-digit ratings shares in every year from 1978 to 1995, including number one ratings in 1979 and 1981. For most of this time, from 1983 to 1996, Dave "Kruser" Klusenhaus hosted mornings.

As radio ownership rules were deregulated in the 1990s, Village began expanding its holdings in Lexington area by buying Georgetown's WTKT (103.3 FM) and WBBE (1580 AM). The three Village stations were then sold in 1996 to Jacor Communications of Cincinnati.

=== WBUL ===
In 1998, Jacor effectuated a format swap between two of its stations. WKQQ's call sign and programming moved to the former WWYC at 100.1 MHz. In exchange, WWYC's country format moved to 98.1 as part of a substantial relaunch, which local Jacor management noted could not occur without the frequency change. The station stunted by playing only Garth Brooks songs and became country-formatted WBUL.
