= WVLK =

WVLK may refer to:

- WVLK (AM), a radio station (590 AM) licensed to Lexington, Kentucky, United States
- WVLK-FM, a radio station (92.9 FM) licensed to serve Lexington, Kentucky
- WLXX, a radio station (101.5 FM) licensed to serve Richmond, Kentucky, which held the call sign WVLK-FM from 2007 to 2020
