= WKQQ =

Radio station in Winchester–Lexington, Kentucky

- Winchester, Kentucky; United States
- Broadcast area: Lexington metropolitan area
- Frequency: 100.1 MHz (HD Radio)
- Branding: 100.1 WKQQ

Programming
- Format: Classic rock
- Subchannels: HD2: Blues
- Affiliations: Westwood One

Ownership
- Owner: iHeartMedia; (iHM Licenses, LLC)
- Sister stations: WBUL-FM, WLAP, WLKT, WMXL, WWTF

History
- First air date: October 2, 1974; 51 years ago
- Former call signs: WKDJ (1974–1981); WFMI (1981–1989); WLFX (1989–1992); WHRS-FM (1992–1993); WWYC (1993–1998)

Technical information
- Licensing authority: FCC
- Facility ID: 68206
- Class: C2
- ERP: 20,000 watts
- HAAT: 194 meters (636 ft)
- Transmitter coordinates: 38°07′24″N 84°26′37″W

Links
- Public license information: Public file; LMS
- Webcast: Listen Live; HD2: Listen Live
- Website: wkqq.iheart.com

WKQQ (100.1 FM) is a radio station licensed to the city of Winchester, Kentucky, serving Lexington and the greater Central Kentucky area. The station is owned by iHeartMedia and airs a classic rock format.

WKQQ has an effective radiated power (ERP) of 20,000 watts. The transmitter is on Russell Cave Road near Huffman Mill Pike, amid the towers for other Lexington-area FM and TV stations. The studios and offices were on Main Street in Lexington prior to 1974. They moved to 1074 New Circle after WKYT built new station on Winchester Rd. WKQQ broadcasts from a building on 2601 Nicholasville Rd.

== History ==
WKDJ began broadcasting from Winchester on October 2, 1974. It was originally owned by Clark Communications Company, a business of David Greenlee.

WKDJ left the air in December 1980. Its country music format was replaced in late February 1981 by WFMI, owned by the Cromwell Group and featuring Top 40 music. WFMI and WHRS (1380 AM) were then sold to Premier Broadcast Corporation of Albany, New York, in 1988. Coinciding with a planned power increase from 3,000 to 50,000 watts, the station switched to classic rock in February 1989 and rebranded as WLFX "Fox 100".

Premier placed itself in receivership in 1991. Hancock Communications of Nashville acquired the pair the next year with plans to sell both facilities to other companies: while buyers were lined up for both stations, WLFX began simulcasting WHRS and its new soft adult contemporary format. As a result of the sale action, the 100.1 station changed hands in rapid succession, being purchased by Trumper Communications in 1993. Trumper relocated the transmitter facility to Lexington, and upon taking over, the format was changed to country as "Young Country" WWYC, competing with market leader WVLK-FM.

Trumper Communications's three-station Lexington cluster was acquired by Jacor in 1996.

In 1998, Jacor effectuated a format swap between two of its stations. The country music format on WWYC was moved to 98.1, where it was relaunched as WBUL-FM "The Bull", while WKQQ's call sign and programming moved to 100.1 MHz. The station has been assigned these call letters by the Federal Communications Commission since February 4, 1998. Later that year, Jacor was purchased by Clear Channel Communications (forerunner to iHeartMedia) for $2.8 billion.
