= WGKS =

- Paris, Kentucky; United States
- Broadcast area: Lexington Metro; Central Kentucky
- Frequency: 96.9 MHz
- Branding: KISS 96-9

Programming
- Format: Gold-based adult contemporary

Ownership
- Owner: L.M. Communications, Inc.
- Sister stations: WCDA, WLXG, WBVX, WBTF

History
- First air date: June 15, 1968
- Former call signs: WPDE-FM (1968–1972); WBGR-FM (1972–1981); WNCW (1981–1985); WCOZ (1985–1992); WCOZ-FM (1992)
- Former frequencies: 96.7 MHz (1968–1992)
- Call sign meaning: Kiss

Technical information
- Licensing authority: FCC
- Facility ID: 36140
- Class: C2
- ERP: 50,000 watts
- HAAT: 150 meters (490 ft)
- Transmitter coordinates: 38°7′32″N 84°21′12″W

Links
- Public license information: Public file; LMS
- Webcast: Listen live
- Website: www.kiss969fm.com

WGKS (96.9 FM) is a commercial radio station broadcasting a gold-based adult contemporary radio format and calling itself "KISS 96-9". Licensed to Paris, Kentucky, United States, the station serves the Lexington-Fayette media market. It is owned by L.M. Communications, Inc. Studios and offices are located at Triangle Center on West Main Street in Lexington. The transmitter is off Houston Antioch Road, also in Lexington.

WGKS is on air as Kiss 969, Lexington's Greatest Hits. The on air line up is Tricia in the morning, Action Jackson in the midday, Patrick Scott PMD and Skip Eliot is nights.

== History ==
The station was assigned the call sign WCOZ on February 25, 1984. On June 11, 1992, the station changed its call letters to WCOZ-FM. Just over a week later, on June 19, the station changed its call sign to the current WGKS.

Previous logo

On September 22, 2020, WGKS changed their format from soft AC to classic hits, still under the "Kiss 96.9" branding.
