= WKYT-TV =

Television station in Lexington, Kentucky

- Lexington, Kentucky; United States
- Channels: Digital: 21 (UHF); Virtual: 27
- Branding: WKYT; The CW Lexington (27.2)

Programming
- Affiliations: 27.1: CBS; 27.2: The CW; for others, see § Subchannels

Ownership
- Owner: Gray Media; (Gray Television Licensee, LLC)
- Sister stations: WYMT-TV

History
- First air date: September 30, 1957
- Former call signs: WKXP-TV (1957–1958); WKYT (1958–1961)
- Former channel numbers: Analog: 27 (UHF, 1957–2009); Digital: 13 (VHF, 2002–2010), 36 (UHF, 2010–2019)
- Former affiliations: Independent (1957–1958); CBS (primary 1958–1961, secondary 1961−1968); ABC (1961–1968); UPN (27.2, 2004–2006)
- Call sign meaning: Kentucky Television

Technical information
- Licensing authority: FCC
- Facility ID: 24914
- ERP: 900 kW
- HAAT: 296.2 m (972 ft)
- Transmitter coordinates: 38°2′23″N 84°24′10″W

Links
- Public license information: Public file; LMS
- Website: www.wkyt.com

WKYT-TV (channel 27) is a television station in Lexington, Kentucky, United States, affiliated with CBS and The CW. The station is owned by Gray Media, and maintains studios and transmitter facilities on Winchester Road (US 60), near I-75, on the east side of Lexington. In addition to WKYT-TV, Gray owns WYMT-TV (channel 57) in Hazard, Kentucky, a separate CBS affiliate serving eastern Kentucky with its own syndicated programming inventory and local newscasts.

While the authorization to build channel 27 in Lexington was given in 1953, the original owner, radio station WLAP, opted to hold off on construction for economic reasons. When WLAP was sold in 1956, the construction permit was sold with it, and the new owners signed the station on as WKXP-TV in 1957. Originally an independent station dependent on films for much of its programming, the station affiliated with CBS in 1958 before being sold to what became Taft Broadcasting and becoming WKYT. Taft switched all of its stations to ABC affiliation in 1961, but after Taft shed WKYT-TV to Kentucky Central Life Insurance Company in 1967 and the station returned to CBS, it eventually became a dominant force in Lexington television. In 1985, WYMT-TV was built as a complement to WKYT-TV.

Financial troubles at Kentucky Central led to its takeover by the state of Kentucky in 1993, and Kentucky Central's highly performing broadcasting properties were placed on the market. Out of nine bidders, Gray Communications Systems—today's Gray Media—narrowly won the bidding for the WKYT–WYMT pair. The station has faced renewed competition for news viewership in the market since the 2000s.

== History ==
=== WLAP's UHF U-turn ===
The American Broadcasting Corporation (no relationship to the American Broadcasting Company, ABC), owner of Lexington radio station WLAP, applied to the Federal Communications Commission (FCC) in June 1952 for a new television station on the newly available ultra high frequency (UHF) channel 27 in Lexington. A second application was filed for the channel by the West–Bingham Television Company, whose principals had no radio or television experience but owned a series of local businesses. As a result, both of the allotted UHF television channels for Lexington each had two competing applications, which could have delayed the arrival of television to the city.

This changed in 1953—not because of FCC action but because the owners of West–Bingham Television Company were exiting one of their local ventures. They had proposed to locate the station at the Ranch Motel on Winchester Road, but it was announced in June 1953 that they were selling the motel to a Florida couple. It was indicated that the completion of this sale would come alongside the withdrawal of their permit application. The West–Bingham application was dismissed in November, and the permit was granted on December 3, with WLAP officials claiming they would be on the air with Lexington's first TV station within six months. Within days, grading began of a site at the intersection of the Northern Belt and Liberty Road.

However, on February 19, 1954, WLAP announced it had put a halt to its television construction efforts. That day, in a full-page advertisement entitled "So The People May Know", the American Broadcasting Corporation laid out its reasons to suspend construction. The issues mostly concerned UHF. The firm believed that a UHF television station would have trouble reaching the promised service area, and it cited the difficulties of UHF television operations that had surrendered construction permits or left the air, making particular mention of the difficulties of KCTY in Kansas City and WROV-TV in Roanoke, Virginia. Their announcement came the same day that Lexington radio station WVLK abandoned their application for channel 18 for similar reasons, leaving WLEX unopposed in its bid to start WLEX-TV on channel 18.

At this time, even with the fine cooperation and wishful thinking of the many interested parties, we believe an acceptable AREA-WIDE UHF television service from Lexington would be an economic imposition on everyone concerned.

— American Broadcasting Corporation

=== WKXP-TV: Construction ===
Two years later, the sale of WLAP to Community Broadcasting Company—one of the largest sales in Kentucky broadcasting history to that time—included the unused WLAP-TV construction permit. The new owners of WLAP announced they would build out the unused construction permit by September 1 and changed the call sign to WKXP-TV. Program tests began September 23, with commercial operation beginning on September 30. The station would not have any network affiliation at launch and was heavily dependent on a Warner Bros. film package to fill out its broadcast day. Studios were in a Quonset hut on New Circle Road NE.

Only months after signing on, however, Community Broadcasting Company explored a sale. On February 8, 1958, it was reported that a deal to sell the station to WVLK for $275,000 and rename it WVLK-TV was imminent; WLAP and WVLK would also swap studio facilities in the move. However, within two weeks, and after WVLK had offered to buy the radio and television stations instead of just WKXP-TV, talks broke down and were suspended.

Meanwhile, separate out-of-state buyers expressed interest in WLAP and WKXP-TV. Radio Cincinnati, Inc., a company of Hulbert Taft which owned WKRC radio and television in Cincinnati, negotiated to purchase the TV station, bringing WKXP-TV into a fold that included radio and television operations in Ohio, Tennessee, and Alabama. Sales for WLAP and WKXP-TV were formally announced on March 17; Taft announced plans to broadcast some of WKRC-TV's programs over WKXP-TV. Meanwhile, Community secured CBS affiliation for WKXP-TV, giving it its first network hookup after six months on the air. The new owners initially announced that the call letters would be changed to WTAF.

=== The Taft years ===
The FCC authorized the sale to the Taft group on May 14, 1958, and on June 2, the call letters were changed to WKYT. (Note: The WKYT call sign had previously belonged to a proposed station on channel 14, later 62, in Owensboro, Kentucky.) (Note: The suffix was added in 1961, making the call sign WKYT-TV.) The new ownership continued operating WKYT as a CBS affiliate and began an expansion of the station's studios. The various Taft broadcasting properties were consolidated under a new company, Taft Broadcasting, in 1959.

In 1961, WKYT-TV switched network affiliations from CBS to ABC as part of a group affiliation agreement that also saw WKRC-TV and WBRC-TV in Birmingham, Alabama, convert to ABC; Taft cited good relations with the network at its existing ABC affiliate, WTVN-TV in Columbus, Ohio. Among the station's programs was a Saturday dance show hosted by Nick Clooney. Clooney also did weekend news anchoring work, leading to a lengthy career as a news anchor across the United States.

=== Kentucky Central ownership ===
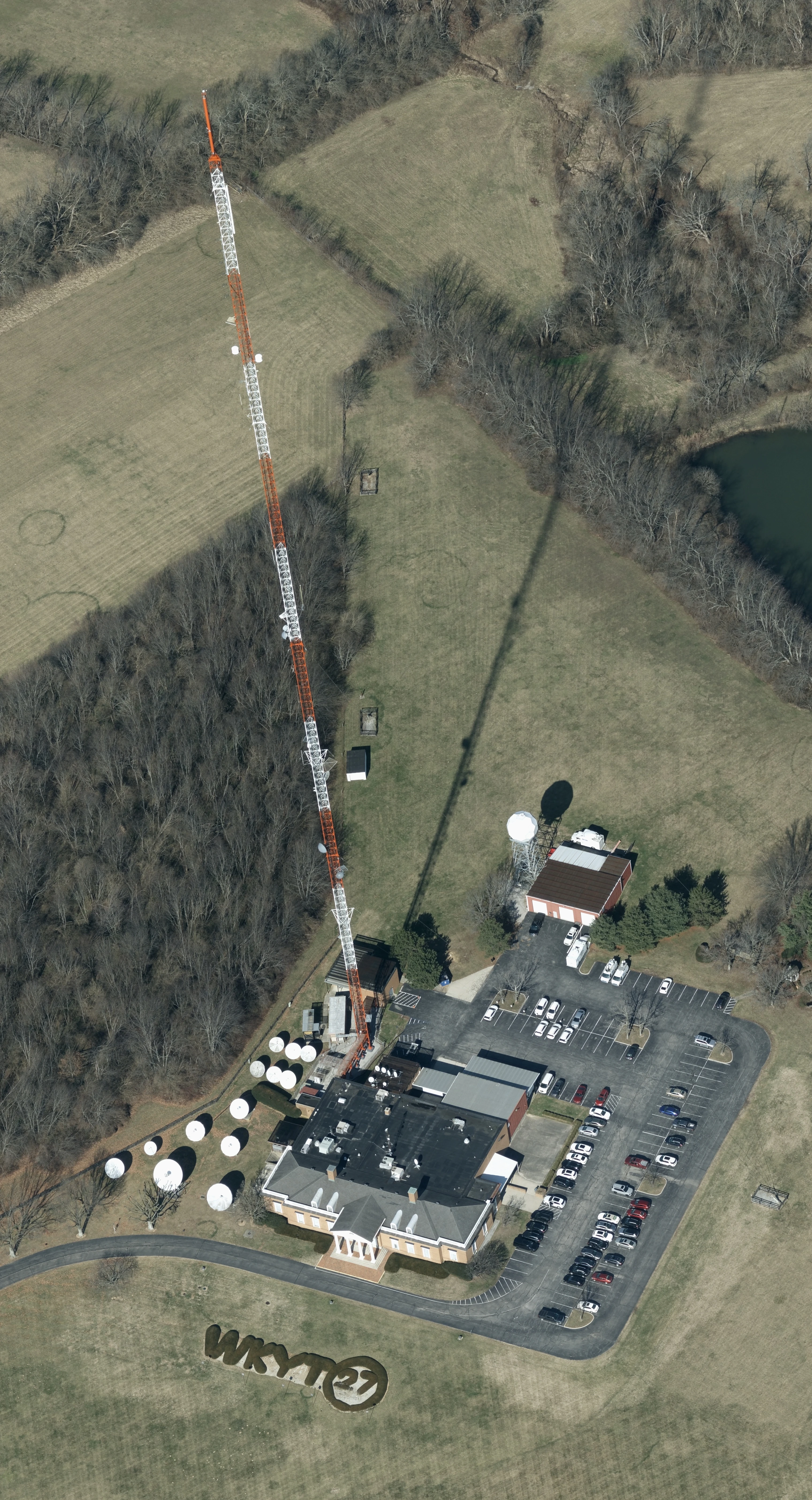
WKYT's studio building and tower, built during Kentucky Central ownership

Kentucky Central Television, a subsidiary of the Kentucky Central Life Insurance Company, reached an agreement to acquire WKYT-TV in 1967 for $2.5 million. The deal was noteworthy because Kentucky Central had a pending application for what would have been Lexington's third station on channel 62, but it faced competition from another local group known as WBLG-TV Inc.; the purchase cleared the way for the construction of that station (now WTVQ-DT, channel 36). Kentucky Central CEO Garvice Kincaid had also been part of the WVLK group that had attempted to purchase WKXP-TV in 1958. In its annual report, Taft noted that Lexington "represented by far the smallest market ... and in the opinion of management is also afforded less opportunity for growth and development than the possible acquisition of new property".

Upon taking control, Kentucky Central began its own series of improvements. In 1968, the station returned to CBS and made plans for its current studio on Winchester Road. Later that year, WKYT was approved to build a new 1,000-foot (300 m) tower adjacent to the new studio. The facility featured the most powerful UHF transmitter in the Commonwealth, operating at 2.3 million watts. The new building was occupied in October 1969. However, the most significant change in the early years under Kentucky Central was in management. Ralph Gabbard was named sales manager of WKYT-TV in 1970 and general manager in 1974. Gabbard would be cited as a cornerstone in turning around a struggling station into a market leader. He placed a high bid for the rights to telecast Kentucky Wildcats athletics replays and coaches' shows; the expensive bid attracted criticism as a money-loser but cemented the Wildcats as part of the station's identity.

In 1985, Kentucky Central expanded its CBS service in the Lexington market by purchasing WKYH-TV, a small NBC affiliate in Hazard with failing equipment, and relaunching it as a semi-satellite of WKYT-TV, WYMT-TV, from new facilities. The general manager of competitor WTVQ derided the purchase as part of an "empire plan" that would give WKYT a competitive advantage. The revamped station provided a far better signal as well as local news coverage for eastern Kentucky. It also served to capture an audience partly served by stations in West Virginia, not Kentucky.

=== Gray ownership ===
WKYT logo from 2012 to 2024

In February 1993, the Kentucky state insurance commissioner seized Kentucky Central Life Insurance Company as a result of financial difficulties caused by a troubled portfolio of commercial mortgages. In the wake of the state takeover, Kentucky Central's broadcast portfolio—consisting of WKYT-TV, WYMT, and WVLK AM and FM—was put on the market to raise cash for the company, as the stations represented the most saleable assets of the insurer and were highly successful properties; Kentucky Central's board of directors had intended to sell the stations and other non–life insurance divisions as part of a salvage plan but ran out of time to implement it. At the same time that inquiries were received from around the United States, Ralph Gabbard began to put together a consortium of investors to bid on WKYT and WYMT. However, it was unclear if the stations would even be sold. The Kentucky insurance commissioner considered selling the entire company as a package; however, the combination of the radio and television stations was grandfathered, and under FCC rules of the time, no one buyer could purchase all four stations. Names mentioned in connection with a purchase included Granite Broadcasting and Jefferson-Pilot.

In all, 13 bids were received for WKYT and WYMT by July 28, 1993, along with nine for the radio stations and eight for the ailing life insurance business. Gabbard's bid came in second, narrowly losing to Gray Communications Systems of Albany, Georgia; the state rejected a request by Gabbard to let him exceed Gray's offer. The Gray offer was unexpected in broadcasting circles because the company had just experienced a major change in ownership with the sale of a minority stake by the Gray family to a firm headed by J. Mack Robinson. The sale was protested by the estate of Garvice Kincaid, which desired to retain the stations, and the $38 million sale was not consummated until September 1994. After the sale, Gabbard, who was widely respected in the industry and had chaired the CBS affiliates board, became president of Gray's television division; he died on a business trip in 1996.

In 2004, WKYT assumed the UPN affiliation from WBLU-LP, placing it on its second digital subchannel; the shift was modeled after that made the same year by Gray's WVLT-TV in Knoxville, Tennessee, and it upgraded UPN from an analog low-power station to digital full-power status. The UPN subchannels in Lexington and Knoxville were among the first such digital multicast services; by 2008, there were 40 such subchannels in the Gray group. The UPN subchannel became Lexington's affiliate of The CW upon the merger of UPN with The WB in 2006; The WB programming had only been available in Lexington on cable through WBKI-TV from the Louisville market. In 2007, WKYT began broadcasting its CW subchannel in high-definition, making it among the first stations to transmit two HD channels on its multiplex.

== Local programming ==
=== News operation ===
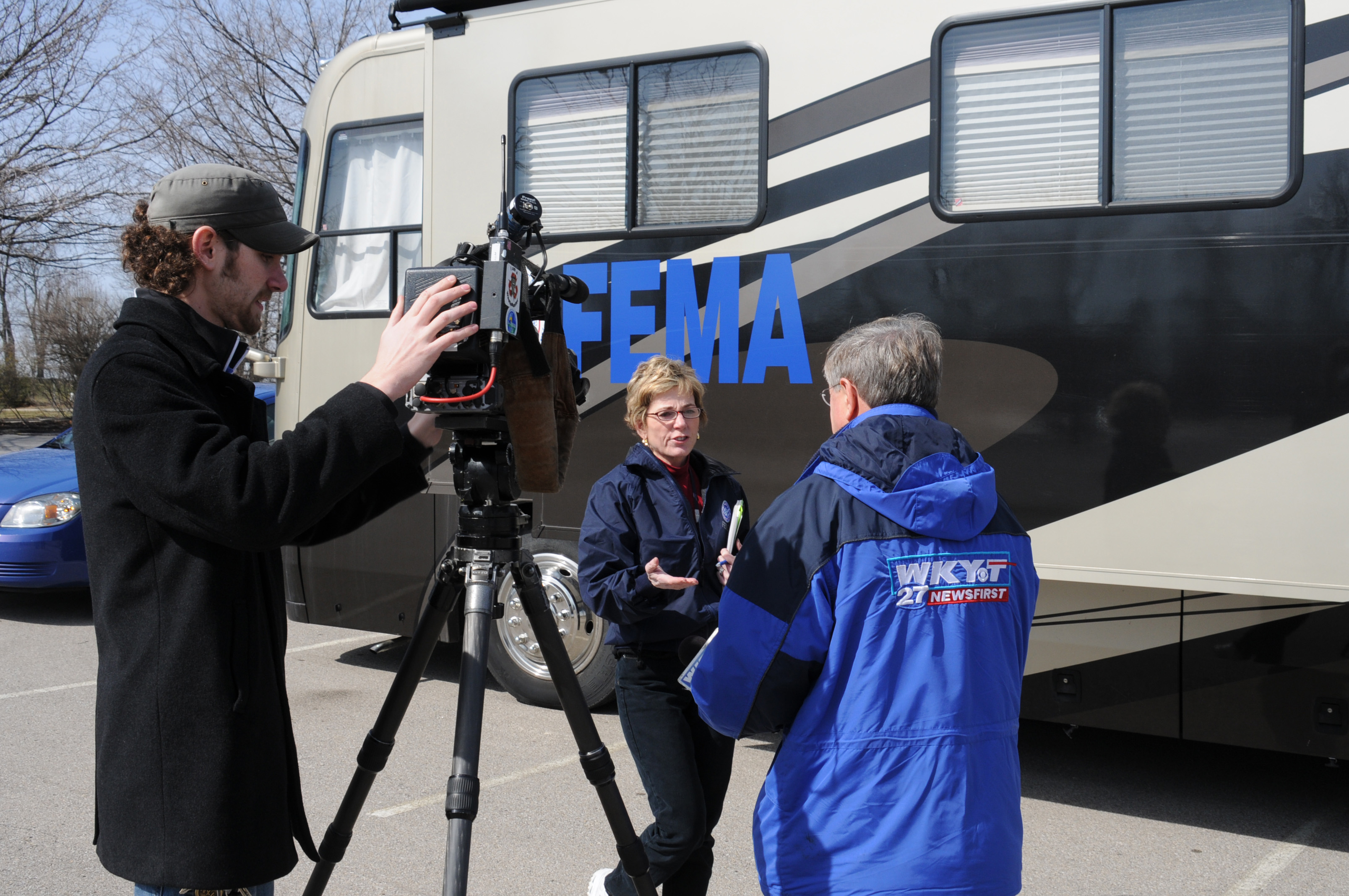
WKYT reporter interviewing a FEMA official in 2008

By the mid-1970s, WKYT-TV already held the market-wide lead in news, narrowly edging out WLEX-TV. However, the introduction of the market's first 60-minute early-evening newscast marked a milestone and led to the station widening its lead. From the mid-1970s to the mid-2000s, it was the consistent ratings leader in Lexington television news, with ratings that at times matched WLEX and WTVQ combined. As a result, when WLEX passed WKYT in 2004 after a multi-year rebuild of its news department, it was front-page news; however, WKYT management asserted that the combination of WKYT and WYMT still garnered more viewers.

In 1995, WKYT began a production commitment with WDKY-TV, the city's Fox affiliate, to produce a 10 p.m. newscast. WKYT supplied all of the talent except co-anchor Marvin Bartlett, an employee of WDKY. Within two years, the newscast, which WDKY paid channel 27 to produce, made money. On March 12, 2007, WDKY began airing an hour of news on weekday mornings at 7 a.m., also produced by WKYT. This relationship ended in January 2022, when new WDKY owner Nexstar Media Group opted to staff its own newsroom.

Even as WKYT has expanded news programming in the 2010s and early 2020s, it has increasingly contended with WLEX in news ratings while WTVQ has remained a distant third. In 2012, the station added weekend morning newscasts, followed by a new 4 p.m. news hour in 2013. By 2014, WLEX was winning again in the immediate Lexington area, though WKYT still had an advantage in the rural areas surrounding Lexington. WKYT responded to competition with a brand refresh, including dropping its longtime 27 NewsFirst brand for WKYT News.

=== Non-news programming ===
In addition to its local news, WKYT produces several non-news programs, including the weekly news interview program Kentucky Newsmakers and weekday lifestyle program Everyday Kentucky.

Since 2003, WKYT has produced the weekly Scholastic Ball Report program during the Kentucky high school basketball season. It airs on WKYT's CW subchannel, WYMT, and WBKO in Bowling Green.

Starting in 2024, WKYT's CW subchannel became an affiliate of the Indiana Fever television network, carrying 17 games in that season.

As part of a group-wide deal with WXIX-TV, WKYT's CW subchannel also started simulcasting select Cincinnati Reds games with FanDuel Sports Network Ohio.

=== Notable former on-air staff ===
- Sam Champion; interned while a student at Eastern Kentucky University
- Emily Gimmel

== Technical information ==
=== Subchannels ===
WKYT-TV's transmitter is co-sited with its studios on Winchester Road (US 60), near I-75, on the east side of Lexington. The station's signal is multiplexed:

Subchannels of WKYT-TV
Subchannel	Res.	Short name	Programming
27.1	1080i	WKYT-HD	CBS
27.2	1080i	CWKYT	The CW
27.3	480i	The 365	365BLK
27.4	480i	MeTV	MeTV
27.5	480i	DABL	Dabl
27.6	480i	RADAR	"First Alert Weather" Radar

=== Analog-to-digital conversion ===
WKYT-TV shut down its analog signal, over UHF channel 27, on April 16, 2009. The station's digital signal initially remained on its pre-transition VHF channel 13. However, on August 22, 2009, WKYT-DT filed a petition of rulemaking with the FCC to move to digital UHF channel 36, vacated by WTVQ's analog signal, due to reception issues. the FCC approved the petition on October 22. The switchover to the UHF signal took place on September 1, 2010.

In 2019, WKYT-TV was repacked from channel 36 to channel 21.
