= WBVX =

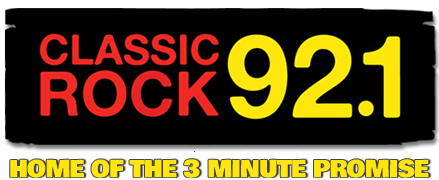
- Carlisle, Kentucky; United States
- Broadcast area: Lexington Metropolitan Area; Central Kentucky
- Frequency: 92.1 MHz
- Branding: Classic Rock 92.1

Programming
- Format: Classic rock
- Affiliations: Cincinnati Bengals Radio Network

Ownership
- Owner: L.M. Communications of Kentucky, LLC
- Sister stations: WBTF, WCDA, WGKS, WLXG

History
- First air date: January 1995 (as WCAK at 100.7)
- Former call signs: WWLW (1992–1994, CP); WCAK (1994–1997); WVCM (1997–1998); WSTL (1998–2001)
- Former frequencies: 100.7 MHz (1995–2002)

Technical information
- Licensing authority: FCC
- Facility ID: 30191
- Class: C2
- ERP: 32,000 watts
- HAAT: 186 meters (610 ft)
- Transmitter coordinates: 38°11′19″N 84°22′13″W

Links
- Public license information: Public file; LMS
- Webcast: Listen Live
- Website: classicrock921fm.com

WBVX (92.1 FM) is a classic rock–formatted radio station licensed to Carlisle, Kentucky, United States, and serving the Lexington metropolitan area and Bluegrass region of central Kentucky. The station is currently owned by LM Communications part of a conglomerate with Lexington–licensed ESPN Radio–affiliated sports radio station WLXG (1300 AM), Paris–licensed classic hits station WGKS (96.9 FM), Versailles–licensed Adult Top 40 station WCDA (106.3 FM), and Midway–licensed urban contemporary station WBTF (107.9 FM). The station's studios are located at Triangle Center in downtown Lexington, and its transmitter is located in far northeast Fayette County, Kentucky.

== History ==
What became WBVX began as the desire of Cincinnati, Ohio native Jim Gray, who requested for the Federal Communications Commission to provide an allotment for Carlisle, Kentucky as early as 1988. The station began as construction permit WWLW on 3 December 3, 1992. On 19 December 1994, the station changed its call sign to WCAK, before signing on in January 1995. The station initially broadcast country music on 100.7 MHz.

Just two years after signing-on, WCAK would switch callsigns to WVCM, once used at a country music station in Carrollton, Kentucky (now WIKI, 95.3 FM). These new call letters would be short-lived, however, as the following year it adopted WSTL. In 2001, the station would switch calls again, this time to the current WBVX. Early in the next year, WBVX would switch frequencies to 92.1 MHz.

By 2012, the station was airing a classic hits format as B92. In 2014, LM Communications would flip WBVX from classic hits to its current classic rock format.
