= Kentucky Central Life Insurance Company =

Defunct American insurance company

- Industry: Insurance
- Founded: 1959
- Defunct: February 12, 1993; 33 years ago
- Fate: Collapsed (Liquidated by the Commonwealth of Kentucky in 1994; broadcasting unit sold to Gray Television)
- Successor: Jefferson-Pilot
- Headquarters: Lexington, Kentucky
- Key people: Garvice Kincaid; William E. "Bud" Burnett
- Number of employees: 1,200

Kentucky Central Life Insurance Company (KCL) was one of the largest life insurance companies in the United States, writing policies in 49 states and the District of Columbia until its collapse in 1993. At the time of the collapse Kentucky Central had over $43 billion in assets, making it the seventh largest insurance collapse in United States history, and at the time the largest business collapse in Kentucky history.

== Early years ==
Kentucky Central was a small regional life insurance company based in Louisville, Kentucky until 1959 when controlling interest in the company was purchased by Garvice Kincaid, who was also named CEO of KCL until his death. Already one of the most successful businessmen in Kentucky, Kincaid owned interests in radio and television broadcasting, banking, finance, real estate, and was also a managing partner in his own law firm when he purchased KCL.

In 1963, Kincaid announced plans to move the company to Lexington, Kentucky in an attempt to consolidate his many business interests in the Central Kentucky region. Kentucky Central's move came during a "golden era" of business in Lexington, as the city's economy moved from being agrarian in nature (centering on the tobacco and Thoroughbred industry) as other major corporations such as IBM, Ashland Oil, and Jerrico moved to or began expanding operations in the city.

In January 1967, Kincaid bought WKYT-TV from Taft Broadcasting for $2.5 million.

As Lexington and Kentucky Central grew during the late 1960s and early 1970s, Kincaid had a vision for the future of the city and the financial resources available to make his vision a reality. During this time he began investing profits from KCL into various business ventures, including real estate development projects in the downtown Lexington area. The centerpiece of his vision would be Kincaid Towers, a 22-floor high-rise structure at a cost of $20 million, which took nearly six years to complete.

Kincaid would not live to see his dream of Kentucky Central becoming the cornerstone of Lexington as a financial center of the Southeast when he died in 1975. He was succeeded as CEO by William "Bud" Burnett, who would run the company through an additional boom in the company's insurance, real estate, banking, agricultural and broadcasting businesses. However, he was also at the helm of KCL when the company began its collapse.

== Association with the Webb brothers ==
During Lexington's building boom of the early 1970s, Kincaid entered into a business partnership with brothers Donald and Dudley Webb. The Webb brothers, like Kincaid, were natives of Kentucky's Appalachian region who had previously conducted business with one of Kincaid's banking interests. Kincaid trusted the Webbs to carry out his vision of a modern downtown Lexington and the two parties entered into a number of business transactions, many of which were backed by loans from Kentucky Central. In these arrangements Kentucky Central would loan the Webbs money to develop real estate projects and the brothers would pay back loans on their various properties.

Kincaid trusted the Webb brothers to such an extent that when loaning money for real estate and property development, he would only require Dudley Webb to sign a personal guarantee contract for the loans. This basic contract only assured that the guarantees would not be enforced unless the brothers diverted money from the project or if the project fell into dissolution. In either case the real estate would revert to Kentucky Central.

Bud Burnett continued this agreement with the Webb brothers, where he would loan them funds for real estate projects with the agreement that the guarantees would only be enforced if the project fell into dissolution or if funds were found to be misappropriated or embezzled by the Webbs. This agreement would eventually be one of the factors leading to the downfall of Kentucky Central.

During Burnett's tenure as CEO, Kentucky Central, through Donald and Dudley Webb, began developing even more properties under this arrangement. One reason for the increase in development between the two parties was the downtown revitalization projects associated with Lexington hosting the 1985 Men's and 1986 Women's Final Four events, and the expansion of development projects throughout the Continental United States. Lexington's "new downtown" financed by KCL and developed and managed by the Webb brothers were viewed in the local media as a success story; however, less than ten years later both parties would be in deep financial trouble.

== 1987–1992: Pre-collapse financial strain ==
One reason for the push into the real estate and property development market was due to higher than expected payouts on certain high-risk life insurance products. Kentucky Central had set sales goals which could not be met under the financial conditions given, meaning that the company felt it had to push as much revenue as possible out of its real estate investments. This would eventually lead to fewer internal controls and a risky business plan.

The contractual arrangement between Kentucky Central and the Webbs, along with similar agreements with other local business leaders, began to put a strain on Kentucky Central by the end of the 1980s. Multiple construction and development projects were later cited in court documents as being detrimental to the financial stability of the company. One such example was a 23-story development in the San Francisco, California financial district that was built by the Webb brothers with a loan of $46 million from Kentucky Central. When the Webbs could not sell the development, the property (valued at $25–30 million) reverted to KCL. It was eventually sold for $19 million, at a loss of $27 million. Other examples of similar arrangements took place with Webb developments in New Orleans, Colorado Springs, and Lexington. Kentucky Central's association with the Webb brothers was not its only financial misstep and there were other more glaring and questionable business practices in the company's final days, two of which center on former Kentucky Governor Wallace Wilkinson. Wilkinson and Burnett had been long-time friends and business associates. Burnett had supported Wilkinson's 1987 gubernatorial campaign, and Wilkinson appointed Burnett to the University of Kentucky Board of Trustees in 1988.

Court documents showed that shortly after Wilkinson's election victory in 1987, he sold a hotel property in Frankfort, Kentucky assessed at just over $6 million to a subsidiary of Kentucky Central for $12.6 million, more than twice the assessed value. Also Wilkinson and his wife failed to make interest payments on $11.4 million worth of industrial revenue bonds used to construct a high-rise condominium in downtown Lexington for which Kentucky Central served as guarantor. No legal attempt was formally made to have the Wilkinsons pay the interest until after the company went into liquidation.

Wilkinson, the Webb brothers and other business associates also received loans from Kentucky Central at interest well below the market rate. The Bank of Louisville also received rates at well below market value, as well as other prominent Central Kentucky figures, including former University of Kentucky Athletic Director Larry Ivy and former Kentucky basketball coach Rick Pitino. This practice of issuing loans for high amounts at well under market interest rates also led to the financial instability of Kentucky Central.

For twenty-three years the accounting firm of Deloitte & Touche served as the auditor of Kentucky Central's accounting and financial records. One example involved Bruce Burnett (the son of CEO Bud Burnett) an independent insurance agent in Lexington, who had failed to turn over millions in Kentucky Central premiums paid by customers to the company, and the company in turn never sought payment until after the liquidation.

== 1993–95: Insolvency and liquidation ==
The financial irregularities, loans granted at well under market rates, and failure to collect deficiencies through personal guarantees against more than 30 different borrowers on loans during the late 1980s and early 1990s left Kentucky Central with financial losses in excess of $141 million. On February 12, 1993, the Kentucky Department of Insurance seized Kentucky Central and, after an extensive audit, found the company to be insolvent. After nearly a century in business, one of the nation's leading life insurance companies was effectively out of business and over 1000 employees were laid off.

Kentucky Central's entire broadcast portfolio, which comprised radio stations WVLK and WVLK-FM and television station WKYT-TV (along with its Hazard semi-satellite WYMT-TV), was put up for sale in the wake of the state takeover to raise cash for the company, as the stations represented the most salable assets of the insurer and were highly successful properties. While Kentucky Central had intended to sell the non-life insurance divisions of the company as part of a salvage plan, they were ultimately not able to implement the plan in time.

A total of 13 bids were received for WKYT and WYMT by July 28, 1993, along with nine for the radio stations and eight for the life insurance assets. Gray Communications Systems was the winning bidder for the television stations, with the closest competitor (a bid from WKYT sales manager Ralph Gabbard) finishing in second place; the state would reject a request to let Gabbard exceed Gray's offer. The sale of both WKYT and WYMT was protested by Garvice Kincaid's estate, who expressed a desire to retain the stations; as a result, the sale of the stations to Gray would not be completed until September 1994.

Bud Burnett died of brain cancer in December 1993, ten months after Kentucky Central was declared insolvent.

In February 1994, Jefferson-Pilot was chosen to assume the company's life and annuity responsibilities and provide $250 million in related support. Bankers Trust Company also purchased nearly $225 million in real estate holdings from KCL.

Other business interests were sold to various companies and over thirty lawsuits were filed in Kentucky courts to recoup funds. One of the initial lawsuits filed by the state was against the KCL Board of Directors and the estate of Bud Burnett seeking $200 million in damages. Also sued by the liquidators were Dudley, Donald (and his wife) Julie Webb as well as former governor Wallace Wilkinson. The Webbs were sued for $108 million, but settled after years of litigation for a combined $3.85 million.

== Post-liquidation controversy ==
In the lead-up to the 2007 Kentucky gubernatorial election, Democratic candidate Steve Beshear was accused by his opponent, then-Governor Ernie Fletcher, of having a role in the collapse of Kentucky Central. Beshear's law firm, Stites & Harbison, was hired to serve as general counsel to liquidator Donald Stephens, who was the state insurance commissioner.

However, Stites & Harbison already represented the Bank of Louisville, whose holdings included millions of dollars of securities put up as collateral for a loan connected to Kentucky Central in a complicated real estate deal. Stephens asked another law firm in 1995 to look into allegations that Stites & Harbison had a conflict of interest representing the Office of Insurance while continuing to represent the Bank of Louisville. The report claimed Beshear was not directly involved but had "general knowledge" of the conflict of interest and should have told the insurance commissioner. Later a Jefferson County judge reviewed the case and found no legal or ethical violations on the part of Beshear.

Fletcher attempted to use the issue to show that a conflict of interest prevented Beshear from saving the company and drew a comparison between Beshear and Enron executives at the time of that company's collapse. However, the former Governor's attempts failed as he lost his re-election bid to Beshear by nearly 200,000 votes (18%).
