= WCYN =

WCYN can refer to:

- WCYN (AM), a radio station (1400 AM) licensed to serve Cynthiana, Kentucky, United States
- WCYN-FM, a defunct radio station (102.3 FM) formerly licensed to serve Cynthiana, Kentucky
