= WLXG =

- Lexington, Kentucky; United States
- Broadcast area: Lexington, Kentucky; Frankfort, Kentucky
- Frequency: 1300 kHz
- Branding: ESPN SportsRadio 1300

Programming
- Format: Sports
- Affiliations: ESPN Radio

Ownership
- Owner: L.M. Communications, Inc.
- Sister stations: WCDA; WGKS; WBVX; WBTF

History
- First air date: 1946 (as WKLX)
- Former call signs: WKLX (1946–1952); WLEX (1952–1958); WBLG (1958–1979); WTKC (1979–1986)
- Call sign meaning: Lexington

Technical information
- Licensing authority: FCC
- Facility ID: 36114
- Class: B
- Power: 2,500 watts day; 1,000 watts night
- Transmitter coordinates: 38°5′50.3″N 84°31′44.8″W
- Translator: 92.5 W223CV (Lexington)

Links
- Public license information: Public file; LMS
- Webcast: Listen live
- Website: www.wlxg.com

WLXG (1300 AM) is a sports formatted broadcast radio station affiliated with ESPN Radio. WLXG is licensed to Lexington, Kentucky, United States, and serves the Lexington and Frankfort area. It is owned and operated by L.M. Communications, Inc. The station's studios are located at Triangle Center in downtown Lexington, and its transmitter is located in the northwest part of Lexington.

== FM translator ==
WLXG programming is also relayed to an FM translator. It is owned by L.M. Communications, Inc.

Broadcast translator for WLXG
Call sign	Frequency	City of license	FID	ERP (W)	Class	FCC info
W223CV	92.5 FM	Lexington, Kentucky	148567	63	D	LMS

== History ==
WLXG signed on as WKLX in 1946. It merged with WLEX (1340) by 1952, keeping the 1300 kHz frequency and getting the WLEX calls. Much of the WKLX airstaff (like Claude Sullivan and Artie Kay) went to WVLK. James Narz, who later became famed game show host Tom Kennedy, worked at WKLX in 1948.

In 1958, WLEX was sold to Roy B. White and the call letters were changed to WBLG ("Bluegrass"). In the early-1970s, WBLG was an affiliate of the Chicago Cubs Radio Network.

Until 1978, WBLG was 1,000 watts non-directional in the daytime, and 1,000 watts directional at night. Daytime power was upped to 2,500 watts in 1978.

WBLG became the country-formatted WTKC in 1979.

In 1986, country music gave way to oldies and the calls were changed to WLXG.

In 1990, WLXG switched to a news/talk format. In the mid-2000s, WLXG picked up a sports talk format and became affiliated with ESPN Radio.
