= WWTF =

Radio station in Georgetown, Kentucky

- Georgetown, Kentucky; United States
- Broadcast area: Lexington Metro Area
- Frequency: 1580 kHz
- Branding: WTF 97.7

Programming
- Format: Active rock/alternative rock

Ownership
- Owner: iHeartMedia, Inc.; (iHM Licenses, LLC)
- Sister stations: WBUL-FM, WKQQ, WLAP, WLKT, WMXL

History
- First air date: September 6, 1957 (as WGOR)
- Former call signs: WGOR (1957–1968); WAXU (1968–1991); WTKT (1991–1992); WBBE (1992–1995); WTKT (1995–2001); WSNE (2001–2002); WXRA (2002–2008); WGVN (2008–2012)

Technical information
- Licensing authority: FCC
- Facility ID: 34246
- Class: AM and FM: D
- Power: AM: 10,000 watts day 45 watts night
- ERP: FM: 250 watts vertical
- Transmitter coordinates: 38°10′5″N 84°35′37″W
- Translator: 97.7 W249DJ (Lexington)

Links
- Public license information: Public file; LMS
- Webcast: Listen Live
- Website: wtf977rocks.iheart.com

WWTF (1580 AM) is a commercial radio station broadcasting an active rock and alternative rock radio format. Licensed to Georgetown, Kentucky, United States, WWTF serves the Lexington Metro Area. The station is currently owned by iHeartMedia, Inc. WWTF programming is simulcast on FM translator W249DJ at 97.7 MHz. Since most listening to rock music is on FM, the station uses its FM dial position to identify itself, as "97.7 Lexington's Rock Alternative."

WWTF broadcasts with 10,000 watts by day but severely reduces power at night to 45 watts due to international treaty obligations. 1580 AM is designated a clear-channel frequency allocated to Canada. Since 2006, the allocation has been used by CKDO in Oshawa, and thus no stations are allowed to broadcast a signal on 1580 that reaches within 750 miles of CKDO during nighttime hours. CKDO's directional signal, pointed away from the United States and at the bare minimum allowed for a clear-channel station, is not audible anywhere near Lexington. It uses a directional antenna at all times. The FM translator operates at 250 watts around the clock, the maximum power allowed for a translator. The transmitter is on Ironworks Road in Georgetown. The studios and offices are located on Nicholasville Road in Lexington, with the other iHeart stations in the Lexington media market.

== History ==
Former radio engineer and business owner, Robert Johnson began on September 6, 1957, WGOR signed on the air as a 250–watt daytime-only station. For many years, the station had the WAXU call sign. In the 1960s, WAXU flipped from Top 40 to country music. On September 10, 1973, sister station 103.1 WAXU-FM (now 103.3 WXZZ) signed on the air, simulcasting the country format around the clock.

By the end of 1982, the AM station dropped the country music simulcast and began airing Satellite Music Network's "Stardust" adult standards format, with the call sign WBBE. In 1990, the station reverted to the WAXU call letters, carrying SMN's "Real Country" format.

On April 15, 1991, WAXU became WTKT, simulcasting the oldies format of its FM sister station. WTKT became WBBE again in September 1992, flipping back to WTKT (when the call sign was dropped by the FM) on November 10, 1995. For a few years, WTKT aired an urban contemporary format, as "The Beat." WTKT was purchased by Jacor in 1997. Jacor was acquired by Clear Channel (now iHeartMedia) in 1999. The urban contemporary format moved to 107.9 WBTF in nearby Midway, Kentucky in 2000. WTKT flipped back to adult standards, first simulcasting co-owned WSAI in Cincinnati, Ohio, then as WSNE ("Sunny 1580") in early 2001.

The station switched to sports talk, taking the call letters WXRA (as "Xtra Sports 1580") on October 30, 2002. In 2006, the station flipped to Spanish-language programming as "La Pantera 1580". An urban oldies format was launched in May 2008, with the "Groovin 1580" moniker and WGVN call letters following soon after.

On October 29, 2012, the station flipped to all-comedy, using Clear Channel Radio's 24/7 Comedy Radio service. The call sign was concurrently changed to WWTF. WWTF returned to the all-sports format, using programming from Fox Sports Radio, on Thursday, May 15, 2014.

In September 2016, WWTF added FM translator W249DJ. On February 20, 2017, WWTF flipped to an active rock/alternative rock format as "WTF 97.7."
