= WCDA =

Kentucky-based radio station

Coordinates: 38.048°N 84.499°W

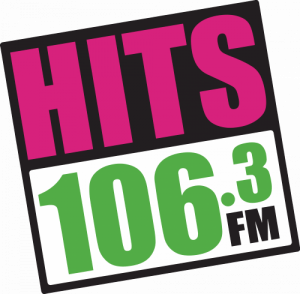

Versailles, Kentucky; United States
- Broadcast area: Lexington Metro area
- Frequency: 106.3 MHz
- Branding: Hits 106.3

Programming
- Format: Adult top 40
- Affiliations: Compass Media Networks

Ownership
- Owner: LM Communications
- Sister stations: WGKS, WBVX, WBTF, WLXG

History
- First air date: July 16, 1973 (as WJMM)
- Former call signs: WJMM (1973–1986); WJMM-FM (1986–1998)
- Call sign meaning: W CD A, as in compact disc

Technical information
- Licensing authority: FCC
- Facility ID: 43861
- Class: A
- ERP: 3,700 watts
- HAAT: 128 meters (420 ft)

Links
- Public license information: Public file; LMS
- Webcast: Listen Live
- Website: hits1063.com

WCDA (106.3 FM, "Hits 106.3") is a radio station licensed to Versailles, Kentucky, United States, broadcasting to the greater Lexington metropolitan area. It plays adult top 40 music, as it is a Mediabase Hot AC reporter. It is owned by L.M. Communications. The station's studios are located at Triangle Center in downtown Lexington, and its transmitter is located atop Lexington Financial Center, also in downtown.

== Current programming ==
Kidd Kraddick In the Morning, Marissa 9a to 2p, Mandy and Shayna 2p to 6p, Mike Adams 6p to 10p
