= WMXL =

Coordinates: 38.123°N 84.444°W

- Lexington, Kentucky; United States
- Broadcast area: Lexington Metro Area; Central Kentucky
- Frequency: 94.5 MHz (HD Radio)
- Branding: Mix 94.5

Programming
- Format: Adult contemporary
- Subchannels: HD2: Talk radio (WLAP)

Ownership
- Owner: iHeartMedia, Inc.; (iHM Licenses, LLC)
- Sister stations: WBUL-FM, WKQQ, WLAP, WLKT, WWTF

History
- First air date: 1940
- Former call signs: WLAP-FM (1940–1992)
- Call sign meaning: "Mix Lexington"

Technical information
- Licensing authority: FCC
- Facility ID: 68208
- Class: C1
- ERP: 85,000 watts
- HAAT: 194 meters (636 ft)

Links
- Public license information: Public file; LMS
- Webcast: Listen live
- Website: mymix945.iheart.com

WMXL (94.5 FM) is a commercial radio station licensed to Lexington, Kentucky, United States. Owned by iHeartMedia, it features an adult contemporary format branded as "Mix 94.5": The transmitter is sited on Russell Cave Road near Huffman Mill Pike in Lexington; its signal is heard as far south as London, as far east as Morehead, as far north as Cincinnati and as far west as Louisville. WMXL-FM broadcasts in HD Radio; the HD-2 digital subchannel simulcasts WLAP.

== History ==
=== WLAP-FM ===
In 1940, the station signed on as WLAP-FM, the FM counterpart to WLAP 630 AM. The two stations mostly simulcast WLAP's programming. In the 1940s and 50s, WLAP-AM-FM were CBS Radio Network affiliates; in the 1960s, the two stations played contemporary hits.

Logo used until 2016

In 1974, the simulcast ended. The AM station moved to a full service, adult contemporary sound, while WLAP-FM remained as at Top 40 outlet. The station was automated, without disc jockeys. It used TM's Stereo Rock format as "The New WLAP 94 and a 1/2, The Music FM" for many years. After transitioning to live programming in 1987, saw its peak of popularity in the late 1980s and early 1990s, shifting to a more rhythmic contemporary or "Churban" direction. At that time, the station was known as "The New Power 94 and a 1/2, WLAP-FM". It was programmed by Lexington native Gregory "Barry Fox" Peddicord. In 1991, Dale O'Brian was named Program Director.

=== Mix 94.5 ===
On April 1, 1992, O'Brian oversaw a shift to Hot Adult Contemporary music and the name Mix 94.5. The station switched its call sign to WMXL to reflect its "Mix" name.

Dale O'Brian served as morning show host and program director for much of the early 1990s and was named Billboard Magazine's "Personality of the Year" in 1996. O'Brian left for the programming position at Z104 in Washington, DC in July 1996. At that point, Rick O'Shea arrived to guide the morning show, and Doug Hamand was given control of the programming. The O'Shea version of the station's Breakfast Club also featured local radio legend Matt Jaeger and former Miss Kentucky Kristie Hicks.

Other popular Mix 94.5 air talent during this period included Barry Fox and longtime Lexington air talent Mike Graves. Fox served as music director before assuming programming duties, and the station prospered during the late 1990s.

O'Shea left the station in 1998 and Matt Jaeger took over the lead role on the morning show, continuing to dominate the Lexington adult audience. It was during this time period that the station's owner, Jacor Broadcasting, began to replace live air talent with out-of-town recorded shows from within the company. As a result, audience share began to slowly erode, and WMXL has thus never been a market leader under iHeartMedia (which, as Clear Channel Communications, absorbed Jacor in 1999). Station programming today comes from iHeartMedia's "Premium Choice" "Soft Rock" program feed.

=== Adult Contemporary ===
Barry Fox left Lexington to program WDJX in Louisville, and was replaced by T.R. Fox, who arrived from Rochester, New York. This Fox, no relation to Barry, programmed the station for several years, before giving way to the return of Dale O'Brian. T.R. Fox oversaw the shift from Hot AC to Mainstream Adult Contemporary.

Under Program Director Dale O'Brian, WMXL was one of the first stations in the country to go with "All Christmas music" during the month of December. In later years, the station began to start Christmas music earlier. These days, from early November until December 26 of each year, WMXL flips to a Christmas format for the holiday season, branding itself as "MixMas on Mix 94.5." In 2023, MixMas began on October 31, which was the earliest that WMXL has ever started Christmas music in the history of the station, and the first non-stunting all-Christmas station in the United States that year (another station had flipped 12 days prior, but that station was later revealed to be stunting in anticipation of a change in format). WMXL's flip to Christmas music was ten days prior to its parent company iHeartMedia's other stations.
