= WEKY =

- Richmond, Kentucky; United States
- Broadcast area: Lexington Metro Area
- Frequency: 1340 kHz
- Branding: Y-92.5

Programming
- Format: Classic hits
- Affiliations: ABC Radio

Ownership
- Owner: Wallingford Communications, LLC
- Sister stations: WCYO, WLFX, WIRV, WKXO

History
- First air date: October 17, 1953

Technical information
- Licensing authority: FCC
- Facility ID: 4811
- Class: C
- Power: 1,000 watts unlimited
- Transmitter coordinates: 37°43′0″N 84°18′25″W
- Translator: 92.5 W223CU (Richmond)

Links
- Public license information: Public file; LMS
- Website: wekyam.com

WEKY (1340 AM) is a radio station broadcasting a classic hits format. Licensed to Richmond, Kentucky, United States, the station serves the Lexington Metro Area. The station is currently owned by Wallingford Communications, LLC and features programming from ABC Radio.

== History ==
On July 7, 2017, WEKY changed its format from news/talk to classic hits, branded as "Y92.5". (info taken from stationintel.com)
