= WBTF =

Coordinates: 38.1948°N 84.6402°W

- Midway, Kentucky; United States
- Broadcast area: Lexington-Fayette metropolitan area
- Frequency: 107.9 MHz
- Branding: 107.9 The Beat

Programming
- Format: Urban contemporary
- Affiliations: Premiere Networks

Ownership
- Owner: L.M. Communications
- Sister stations: WCDA, WGKS, WBVX, WLXG

History
- First air date: 1998
- Former call signs: WAHY (1994–1998, CP)
- Call sign meaning: Beat of Fayette County

Technical information
- Licensing authority: FCC
- Facility ID: 4592
- Class: A
- ERP: 6,000 watts
- HAAT: 100 meters (330 ft)

Links
- Public license information: Public file; LMS
- Webcast: Listen live
- Website: 1079thebeat.com

WBTF (107.9 FM, "107.9 The Beat") is a commercial radio station licensed to Midway, Kentucky, United States, and serving the Lexington-Fayette metropolitan area. Owned by L.M. Communications, WBTF airs an urban contemporary format with studios at Triangle Center in downtown Lexington.

The transmitter is off U.S. Route 60 at Pisgah Pike in Lexington.

== History ==
A construction permit was granted by the Federal Communications Commission for the building of a new FM station in Midway in 1994. It was issued the call sign WAHY, although that was never used on the air.

The station signed on the air in 1998 as WBTF. From its beginning, the station played urban contemporary music, including hip hop and R&B. It was the first time in six years that an FM urban-formatted station was heard in Lexington since WCKU left the format in 1994 to begin playing album rock.

For much of its history, WBTF has been the only FM station in the Lexington market aiming at African-American listeners. Therefore, its playlist included old school music, soul, slow jams and Sunday morning urban gospel to cater to both the mainstream and adult audiences in the African American community.

The station was the home of the Doug Banks Morning Show until the end of 2007, when Banks was replaced by Steve Harvey.
