= WCBR =

American radio station

- Richmond, Kentucky; United States
- Broadcast area: Lexington-Fayette metropolitan area
- Frequency: 1110 kHz
- Branding: Christian Broadcast Radio

Programming
- Format: Christian radio and southern gospel
- Affiliations: Townhall News

Ownership
- Owner: W.C.B.R. Radio, Inc.

History
- First air date: March 7, 1970
- Call sign meaning: Original owner traded as "Christian Broadcasters"

Technical information
- Licensing authority: FCC
- Facility ID: 70617
- Class: D
- Power: 340 watts (days only)
- Transmitter coordinates: 37°45′2.3″N 84°12′21.7″W
- Translator: 93.7 W229CP (Richmond)

Links
- Public license information: Public file; LMS
- Webcast: Listen live
- Website: wcbrradio.com

WCBR (1110 AM) is a commercial radio station licensed to Richmond, Kentucky, United States, and serves the Lexington-Fayette metropolitan area. Owned by W.C.B.R. Radio, Inc., the station carries a Christian radio format with southern gospel music.

WCBR only operates during the daytime hours; its programming is relayed over low-power translator W229CP (93.7 FM) in Richmond, which operates around the clock.

== History ==
The owner, a minister, would ask each week [if] I needed my check or if I wanted to give it to the Lord. And I’d say, "I think I need the check more than the Lord does."

— Gerry House, on working at WCBR

On October 7, 1969, the Federal Communications Commission granted a construction permit to Lewis P. Young, trading as Christian Broadcasters, for a new daytime-only radio station in Richmond; Young was a pastor at Richmond's Gardenside Christian Church. From studios at Second Street and Irvine, WCBR began broadcasting on March 7, 1970; despite the licensee name, the station was secular and an ABC network affiliate. In late 1971, Young sold half of the station to J. T. Parker Jr., owner of station WGOC in Kingsport, Tennessee. Parker also obtained a construction permit for an FM station in Richmond, which signed on May 12, 1972, as WCBR-FM 101.7, a full-time simulcaster of the AM station, airing country music. Gerry House, who later went on to radio and a songwriting career in Nashville, worked at the station as his second radio job, moving to Richmond to be with his girlfriend.

Parker bought out the remaining 50 percent in WCBR in 1975 and then sold some interest in the WCBR stations to three local investors, including the station manager, George W. Robbins. Four years later, Parker sold his remaining 50 percent in the station and the sister FM, which became a separately programmed operation as WBZF in 1976, to David Lee Humes and Mark Anthony Cole, the pair's engineer and advertising consultant, for $271,000. WCBR maintained a country format for most of the 1970s and early 1980s, but by the late 1980s, it had shifted to adult contemporary using programming from Satellite Music Networks, and in the early 1990s, the station was a full-service adult standards outlet.

WCBR adopted its present format of Southern gospel music as well as Christian teaching programs in September 1994, after two months of simulcasting the oldies on the FM frequency. Humes would become the sole owner in 2008, after Robbins died. WCBR itself would return to FM in 2016 when Humes bought a translator, then located in Morill to move it to Richmond to be paired with the AM station.
