= WLKT =

Coordinates: 38.069°N 84.312°W

- Lexington-Fayette, Kentucky; United States
- Broadcast area: Lexington Metro area Central Kentucky
- Frequency: 104.5 MHz (HD Radio)
- Branding: 104.5 The Cat

Programming
- Format: Top 40 (CHR)
- Subchannels: HD2: Real 103.9 (Urban contemporary)
- Affiliations: Premiere Networks

Ownership
- Owner: iHeartMedia, Inc.; (iHM Licenses, LLC)
- Sister stations: WBUL-FM, WKQQ, WLAP, WMXL, WWTF

History
- First air date: July 30, 1992
- Call sign meaning: Lexington's K(C)aT; Lexington, KenTucky

Technical information
- Licensing authority: FCC
- Facility ID: 29575
- Class: C2
- ERP: 50,000 watts
- HAAT: 142 meters (466 ft)
- Translators: 103.9 W280DO (Lexington, relays HD2)

Links
- Public license information: Public file; LMS
- Webcast: FM/HD1: Listen Live; HD2: Listen Live
- Website: FM/HD1: 1045thecat.iheart.com HD2: real1039fm.iheart.com

WLKT (104.5 FM) is a commercial radio station licensed to Lexington-Fayette, Kentucky. The station is owned by iHeartMedia, Inc. who determines its programming in New York using automation, non-local talent, and airs a Top 40 (CHR) radio format. The station's studios are located on Nicholasville Road in south Lexington, and its transmitter is located in rural far east Fayette County, Kentucky.

Its playlist includes Pop, Rock and Hip Hop music. In middays, it carries the syndicated "On Air with Ryan Seacrest." On Sundays, "American Top 40" is heard.

104.5 The Cat is powered at 50,000 watts ERP, with its broadcast signal reaching the eastern suburbs of Louisville, Northern Kentucky suburbs of Cincinnati, Daniel Boone National Forest, Somerset and London. WLKT was the fourth station in the Lexington metropolitan area to begin broadcasting HD Radio after WUKY, WKQQ and WBUL. Its HD-2 subchannel carries an urban contemporary format, simulcast on translator station 103.9 W280DO, known as "Real 103.9."

== History ==
The station signed on the air on July 30, 1992, as WJGG. It was owned by J.L. Givens Associates. Newport Communications, which also owned WLRS in Louisville, later acquired the station.

It was purchased by Jacor in 1997 and switched to a Top 40 (CHR) format. On May 4, 1999, Jacor was purchased by Clear Channel Communications (now iHeartMedia).

=== WLKT-HD2 ===
On July 21, 2011, WLKT-HD2 changed its format from New CHR to Urban Contemporary, branded as "Wild 103.9" (also broadcasts on FM translator W280DO 103.9 FM). The station's moniker later changed to "Real 103.9."

Broadcast translator for WLKT-HD2
Call sign	Frequency	City of license	FID	ERP (W)	HAAT	Class	FCC info
W280DO	103.9 FM	Lexington, Kentucky	147882	250	128.2 m (421 ft)	D	LMS
