= WLTO (disambiguation) =

WLTO is a radio station (102.5 FM) licensed to Nicholasville, Kentucky.

WLTO may also refer to:

- WCMW-FM, a radio station (105.7 FM) licensed to Harbor Springs, Michigan, which held the call sign WLTO from 1988 to 1993
- WLUB, a radio station (105.7 FM) licensed to Augusta, Georgia, which held the call sign WLTO in 1986
- WNMA, a radio station (1210 AM) licensed to Miami Springs, Florida, which held the call sign WLTO from 1969 to 1974
- When Love Takes Over, a song released by French DJ and producer David Guetta and American singer Kelly Rowland in 2009
