= WLFX =

- Berea, Kentucky; United States
- Broadcast area: Richmond; Berea; Irvine
- Frequency: 106.7 MHz
- Branding: 106.7 The Pinnacle

Programming
- Format: Soft AC/AC
- Affiliations: ABC Radio

Ownership
- Owner: Wallingford Communications, LLC
- Sister stations: WCYO, WEKY, WIRV, WKXO

History
- First air date: September 27, 1990 (as WKXO-FM)
- Former call signs: WKXO-FM (1990–1999)
- Call sign meaning: Lexington's FoX (previous format)

Technical information
- Licensing authority: FCC
- Facility ID: 4809
- Class: A
- ERP: 3,300 watts
- HAAT: 128 meters (420 ft)
- Transmitter coordinates: 37°39′40″N 84°8′55″W

Links
- Public license information: Public file; LMS
- Webcast: Listen live
- Website: wlfxfm.com

WLFX (106.7 FM) is a radio station broadcasting a mix of Soft AC and AC formats. Licensed to Berea, Kentucky, United States, the station serves the Richmond area and southern parts of the Lexington area. The station is currently owned by Wallingford Communications, LLC and features programming from Cumulus Media Networks.

== History ==
The station went on the air as WKXO-FM on August 23, 1990. On July 19, 1999, the station changed its call sign to the current WLFX.
