= WIRV =

- Irvine, Kentucky; United States
- Broadcast area: Richmond, Lexington
- Frequency: 1550 kHz
- Branding: V-99.3-FM

Programming
- Format: Oldies
- Affiliations: ABC Radio

Ownership
- Owner: Kentucky River Broadcasting Co., Inc
- Sister stations: WEKY, WKXO, WCYO, WLFX

History
- First air date: July 2, 1960

Technical information
- Licensing authority: FCC
- Facility ID: 34248
- Class: D
- Power: 1,000 watts day 5 watts night
- Transmitter coordinates: 37°42′57″N 83°58′29″W
- Translator: 99.3 W257DP (Irvine)

Links
- Public license information: Public file; LMS
- Website: www.wirvam.com

WIRV (1550 AM) is a radio station broadcasting an oldies format. Licensed to Irvine, Kentucky, United States, the station is owned by Kentucky River Broadcasting Co., Inc and features programming from ABC Radio.

1550 AM is a clear-channel frequency shared by Canada and Mexico.
