= WCYN (AM) =

- Cynthiana, Kentucky; United States
- Broadcast area: Lexington, Kentucky
- Frequency: 1400 kHz
- Branding: WCYN 101.3 & 1400

Programming
- Format: Classic hits
- Affiliations: Fox News Radio; Kentucky News Network; Kentucky Sports Radio; Cincinnati Reds Radio Network

Ownership
- Owner: WCYN Broadcasting, Inc.

History
- First air date: September 1st 1956
- Call sign meaning: CYNthiana

Technical information
- Licensing authority: FCC
- Facility ID: 71307
- Class: C
- Power: 500 watts day 1,000 watts night 250 watts (FM translator)
- Transmitter coordinates: 38°24′20″N 84°17′32″W
- Translator: 101.3 W267CW (Cynthiana)

Links
- Public license information: Public file; LMS
- Webcast: Listen Live
- Website: wcyn.com

WCYN (1400 kHz) is a classic hits–formatted radio station licensed to Cynthiana, Kentucky, United States. The station is owned by WCYN Broadcasting, Inc. The station's studios are located on South Main Street in downtown Cynthiana, while its transmitter is located along US 27 and the Licking River just north of town.

WCYN operates an FM translator, W267CW, on 101.3 MHz.

== History ==
WCYN went on-the-air in September 1956 by the Anderson family. The station would be simulcast on a full-power FM radio station, the now-defunct WCYN-FM (102.3) by the 1970s. At the time, the station aired country music as well as some news and talk.

In 2012, WCYN was airing a country music format. That year, it became an affiliate of ABC News Now.

== Programming ==
WCYN primarily broadcasts a country music format, interspersed with other local and regional programming. This includes local morning show Coffee Break at 8:00 a.m., as well as the syndicated Kentucky Sports Network from Lexington's WLAP (630 AM).

WCYN presently airs news programming from the national Fox News Radio and statewide Kentucky News Network. The station also serves as an affiliate of the Cincinnati Reds Radio Network.

Former logo
