= WKXO =

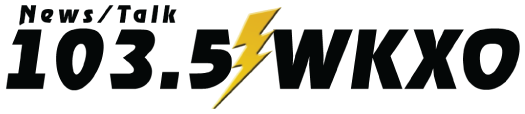
- Berea, Kentucky; United States
- Broadcast area: Richmond, Kentucky
- Frequency: 1500 kHz
- Branding: News/Talk 103.5

Programming
- Format: News Talk

Ownership
- Owner: Wallingford Communications, LLC
- Sister stations: WCYO, WEKY, WIRV, WLFX

History
- First air date: September 1, 1971 (first license granted)

Technical information
- Licensing authority: FCC
- Facility ID: 4810
- Class: D
- Power: 250 watts
- Translator: 103.5 MHz

Links
- Public license information: Public file; LMS
- Website: www.wallingfordmedia.com/our-stations/

WKXO is an AM radio station licensed to the city of Berea, Kentucky. It broadcasts on a frequency of 1500 kHz and is a daytime-only station. The format is known as News/Talk 103.5.

WKXO was a Top 40 station in the early 70's.

1500 AM is a United States clear-channel frequency; two stations share Class A status:

- WFED in Washington, D.C.
- KSTP in Minneapolis, Minnesota.

== FM translator ==
WKXO relays its programming to an FM translator in order to widen the coverage area and also to provide 24 hour coverage. The translator frequency is used in the station branding.

Broadcast translator for WKXO
Call sign	Frequency	City of license	FID	ERP (W)	Class	FCC info
W278CC	103.5 FM	Berea, Kentucky	156048	250	D	LMS
