= WCYO =

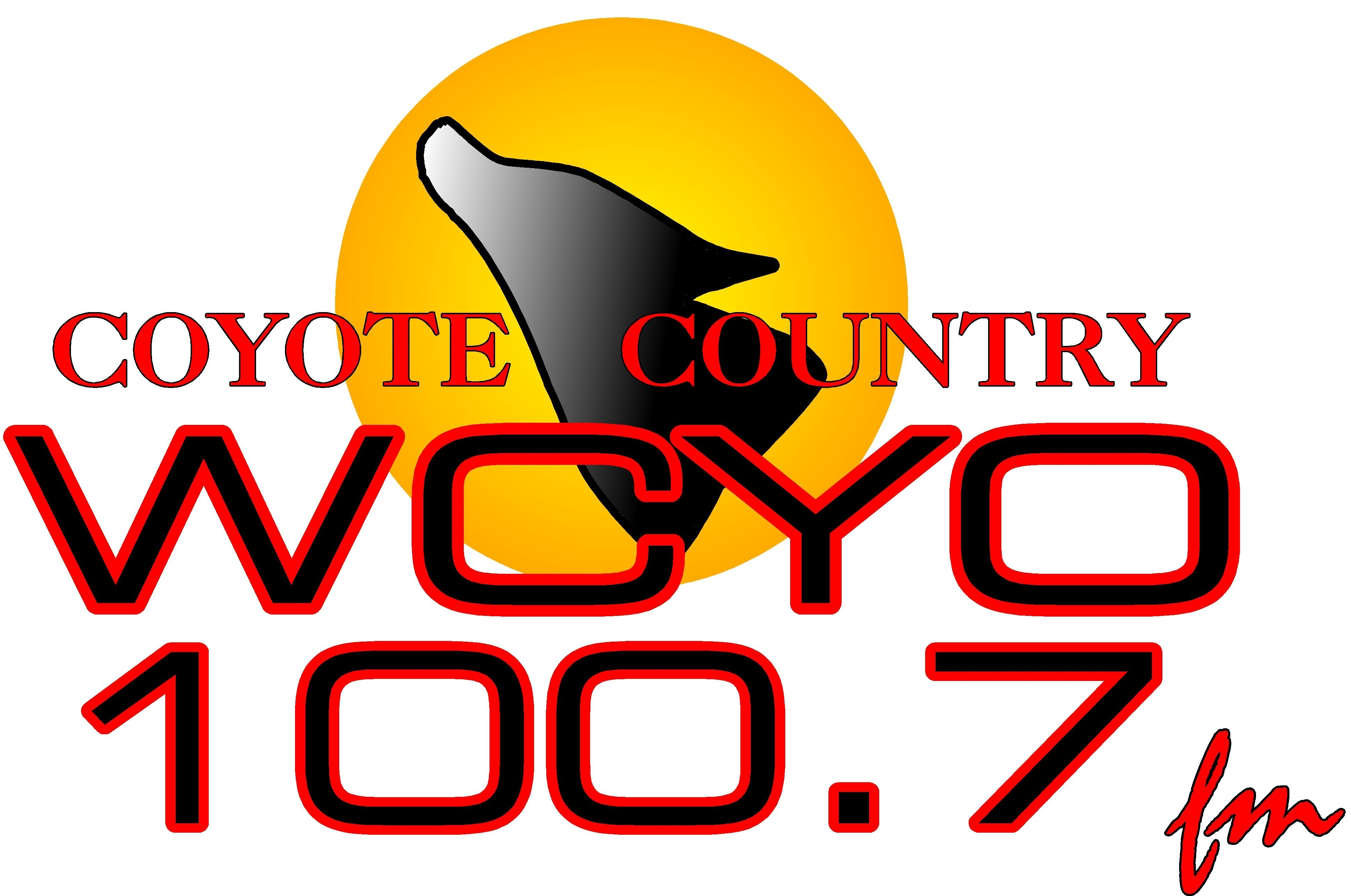

Irvine, Kentucky; United States
- Broadcast area: Richmond; Lexington Metro; Central Kentucky
- Frequency: 100.7 MHz
- Branding: 100.7 The Coyote

Programming
- Format: Country
- Affiliations: ABC News Radio; Westwood One; EKU Sports

Ownership
- Owner: Wallingford Communications, LLC
- Sister stations: WLFX, WEKY, WKXO, WIRV

History
- Call sign meaning: W CoYOte

Technical information
- Licensing authority: FCC
- Facility ID: 34247
- Class: C3
- ERP: 11,000 watts
- HAAT: 151 meters
- Transmitter coordinates: 37°39′40″N 84°8′55″W

Links
- Public license information: Public file; LMS
- Webcast: Listen Live
- Website: wcyofm.com

WCYO (100.7 FM) is a radio station broadcasting a country music format. Licensed to Irvine, Kentucky, United States, the station serves Richmond and surrounding communities, including parts of the Lexington metropolitan area. The station is currently owned by Wallingford Communications.

== History ==
The station was issued the callsign WCYO on April 5, 1991.

== Sports programming ==
100.7 The Coyote is the flagship station for Eastern Kentucky University Colonels sports.
