= Kincaid Towers =

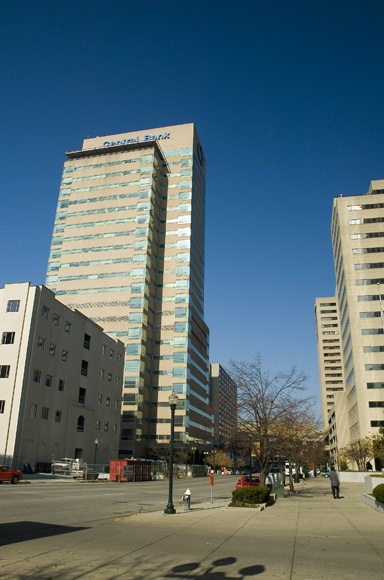
- Interactive map of the Kincaid Towers area

General information
- Status: Completed
- Type: Office; Retail
- Location: Broadway and Mill Street; Lexington, Kentucky, U.S.
- Coordinates: 38.0475°N 84.5004°W
- Construction started: 1973
- Opening: 1979

Height
- Roof: 333-foot (101 m)

Technical details
- Floor count: 22
- Floor area: 421,000 sq ft (39,112 m^{2})

The Kincaid Towers is a 22-floor high-rise in Lexington, Kentucky. It is located along Vine Street between Broadway and Mill Street. Its exterior is polished buff concrete with blue tinted glass, with terraces on the 5th, 10th, 14th, and 21st floor. It has a three-story atrium, and a skywalk that connects to the adjacent Hyatt Regency Hotel and Central Bank Center. It is named after Garvice Delmar Kincaid.

== History ==
Construction on the 421,000 square feet (39,100 m^{2}) tower began in 1973 and was completed in 1979 at a cost of $20 million. Major portions of the movie Steel were filmed there during the summer of 1978, and stuntman A.J. Bakunas died from injuries sustained during a record-breaking free fall from the top of the construction site. It was constructed by Huber, Hunt, and Nichols Inc., an Indianapolis, Indiana firm that also constructed the Hyatt Regency Hotel, the Central Bank Center, Rupp Arena, and Commonwealth Stadium. For the next eight years, it was the tallest building in central Kentucky, at 333 feet (101.49 m), before being surpassed by new construction. Upon completion, it was home to Kentucky Central Insurance Companies.

It features a $345,000 computer/electro-mechanical energy system that occupies the entire 9th floor. Considered "state-of-the-art", it was derived from space technology.

== Original tenants ==
The original tenants included:

- Central Bank and Trust Company, occupying the first seven levels,
- Law firm of Kincaid, Wilson, Schaeffer, and Hembree,
- General Management Associates,
- Cumulus Media Lexington Radio (WVLK, WVLK-FM, WLXX, WLTO, and WXZZ) on the third floor,
- Kentucky Finance Company,
- Kentucky Central Insurance Company, occupying the top 13 floors

== See also ==
- Cityscape of Lexington, Kentucky
