= WXZZ =

- Georgetown, Kentucky; United States
- Broadcast area: Lexington-Fayette Metropolitan Area
- Frequency: 103.3 MHz
- Branding: Z-Rock 103

Programming
- Format: Active rock
- Affiliations: Compass Media Networks; United Stations Radio Networks

Ownership
- Owner: Cumulus Media; (Cumulus Licensing LLC)
- Sister stations: WLTO, WLXX, WVLK, WVLK-FM

History
- First air date: September 10, 1973 (as WAXU-FM at 103.1)
- Former call signs: WAXU-FM (1973–1984); WRMA (1984–1986); WMGB (1986–1989); WTKT (1989–1991); WTKT-FM (1991–1995)
- Former frequencies: 103.1 MHz (1973–1992)
- Call sign meaning: W LeXington's Z-Rock Z

Technical information
- Licensing authority: FCC
- Facility ID: 32425
- Class: A
- ERP: 6,000 watts
- HAAT: 100 meters (328 ft)
- Transmitter coordinates: 38°03′56″N 84°29′12″W

Links
- Public license information: Public file; LMS
- Webcast: Listen live
- Website: zrock103.com

WXZZ (103.3 FM, "Z-Rock 103") is a commercial radio station. It is licensed to Georgetown, Kentucky, and serves the Lexington-Fayette Metropolitan Area. The station is owned by Cumulus Media and airs an active rock radio format. Cumulus uses the Z Rock name as a moniker for WXZZ, as a way to keep the trademark active following the closure of the Z Rock satellite network of the same name in 1996. Studios and offices are located at Kincaid Towers on West Vine Street in Lexington. The transmitter is off Russell Cave Road, also in Lexington.

The station first signed on the air on September 10, 1973, as WAXU-FM. It was originally at 103.1 MHz, and it simulcast its co-owned AM station, 1580 WAXU (now WWTF).
