= WLTO =

Coordinates: 37.960°N 84.545°W

- Nicholasville, Kentucky; United States
- Broadcast area: Lexington Metropolitan Area
- Frequency: 102.5 MHz
- Branding: HOT 102.5

Programming
- Format: Top 40
- Affiliations: Westwood One

Ownership
- Owner: Cumulus Media; (Cumulus Licensing LLC)
- Sister stations: WLXX, WVLK, WVLK-FM, WXZZ

History
- First air date: 1988 (as WCKU)
- Former call signs: WCKU (1988–1994); WLRO (1994–1995)
- Call sign meaning: W LexingTOn

Technical information
- Licensing authority: FCC
- Facility ID: 11673
- Class: A
- ERP: 4,600 watts
- HAAT: 113.7 meters (373 ft)

Links
- Public license information: Public file; LMS
- Webcast: Listen live
- Website: hot1025.net

WLTO (102.5 FM HOT 102.5) is a commercial radio station licensed to Nicholasville, Kentucky and serving the Lexington radio market. It is owned by Cumulus Media and broadcasts a top 40 radio format. The radio studios and offices are inside Kincaid Towers in downtown Lexington, and its transmitter is just south of the Fayette/Jessamine county line on Brannon Road.

The current line up on the station is "The Bert Show," based in Atlanta, in the morning. Jay Michaels hosts middays, Colin Matthews (Program Director) afternoons and the syndicated Elliot and Nina nights.

== History ==
WLTO originally signed on the air in 1988 as an urban contemporary outlet with the call sign WCKU (U102). By early 1994 the station flipped to classic rock as WLRO, only to later switch directions to oldies as WLTO.

In 2001, the station flipped to classic country as "US 102." The WLTO call letters remained on the station.

But that would all change in August 2004 when the station flipped to mainstream Top 40, later evolving into a Rhythmic Contemporary direction. As of 2017, although reported as having a rhythmic contemporary format, the station plays the majority of Top 40 hits, not played on most other rhythmic stations. It was the home to the Dallas-based "The Kidd Kraddick Morning Show" for Central Kentucky. On July 24, 2017, according to All Access.com, WLTO changed its Mediabase reporting panel from Rhythmic to Top 40.
