= WLXX =

- Richmond, Kentucky; United States
- Broadcast area: Lexington Metro Area
- Frequency: 101.5 MHz
- Branding: 101.5 Jack FM

Ownership
- Owner: Cumulus Media; (Cumulus Licensing LLC.)
- Sister stations: WLTO; WXZZ; WVLK-FM; WVLK

History
- First air date: May 12, 1972
- Former call signs: WCBR-FM (1971–1976, 1979–1984); WBZF (1976–1979); WMCQ-FM (1984–1995); WLRO (1995–2007); WVLK-FM (2007–2020)
- Former frequencies: 101.7 MHz (1972–1995)
- Call sign meaning: Lexington

Technical information
- Licensing authority: FCC
- Facility ID: 71249
- Class: C3
- ERP: 9,000 watts
- HAAT: 165 meters (541 ft)
- Transmitter coordinates: 37°52′45.2″N 84°19′32.7″W

Links
- Public license information: Public file; LMS

WLXX (101.5 FM) is a commercial radio station licensed to Richmond, Kentucky, United States, and serving the Lexington metropolitan area. The station is owned by Cumulus Media. WLXX's studios are located in the Kincaid Towers in Downtown Lexington. The transmitter is off Igo Road, near Interstate 75, in rural Madison County just south of the Kentucky River.

The station went on the air in 1972 as WCBR-FM, the FM sister station to WCBR in Richmond. It later had an oldies format as WMCQ-FM and classic hits and sports formats as WLRO. From 2007 to 2014, it simulcast the talk programming of WVLK as WVLK-FM. It then carried the "Nash Icon" country music format until 2018, when it switched to adult hits as "101.5 Jack FM"; the call sign changed to WLXX in 2020. Cumulus, which has owned the station since 1999, took WLXX silent in 2025, before returning the station to the air in 2026.

== History ==
On May 12, 1972, the station signed on as WCBR-FM. It mostly simulcast co-owned WCBR (1110 AM). WCBR-FM was owned by Parker Broadcasting and originally was heard on 101.7 MHz.

In 1995, the station—by WMCQ-FM—switched to 101.5 MHz, getting a boost in power. It also entered into a local marketing agreement with WLTO (102.5 FM), and assumed that station's previous "Arrow" classic hits format and WLRO call sign; WMCQ's oldies format moved to WLTO. In 1999, WLRO was acquired by current owner Cumulus Media. The station switched to a sports radio format.

The WVLK-FM call sign was assigned by the Federal Communications Commission on May 23, 2007. The new call sign reflected a simulcast with WVLK (590 AM), giving that talk station an FM outlet for listeners who prefer FM radio. On October 31, 2014, at 6 a.m., WVLK-FM dropped its talk programming and began stunting by playing only music by Garth Brooks as "Garth 101.5". At 5 p.m. that day, WVLK-FM changed its format to country music, joining the Nash Icon network as "101.5 Nash Icon".

On the morning of February 20, 2018, WVLK-FM flipped to adult hits as "101.5 Jack FM". On September 4, 2020, WVLK-FM swapped call letters with WLXX (92.9 FM), which previously held the WVLK-FM call sign from 1979 to 2003.

In early March 2025, Cumulus took WLXX off the air while evaluating the station's future. It was the first of a series of Cumulus stations to be closed after being deemed "no longer a strategic fit" by the company. The station returned to the air a year later, just before the license was set to be automatically canceled after 365 consecutive days of silence.
