= Claude Sullivan =

American sportscaster

Claude Howard Sullivan (December 29, 1924 – December 6, 1967) was an American sports broadcaster. Born in Winchester, Kentucky, he did the play-by-play broadcasts of the University of Kentucky football and basketball games for nearly 20 years. He was associated with Lexington radio station WVLK, and was appointed director of programming by the station in addition to his sports broadcasting duties.

In 1964, he was hired to work alongside of Baseball Hall of Fame pitcher Waite Hoyt as broadcaster of the Cincinnati Reds' Major League Baseball games. When Hoyt retired in 1965, Sullivan took over the primary play-by-play responsibilities. But after two years, Sullivan was diagnosed with throat cancer, and he died on December 6, 1967, at the age of 42.
