= WYMT-TV =

Television station in Hazard, Kentucky

Semi-satellite of WKYT-TV, Lexington, Kentucky
- Hazard, Kentucky; United States
- Channels: Digital: 12 (VHF); Virtual: 57
- Branding: WYMT; WYMT Mountain News

Programming
- Affiliations: 57.1: CBS; 57.2: Heroes & Icons; 57.3: Outlaw

Ownership
- Owner: Gray Media; (Gray Television Licensee, LLC)
- Sister stations: WKYT-TV

History
- First air date: October 20, 1969
- Former call signs: WKYH-TV (1969–1985)
- Former channel numbers: Analog: 57 (UHF, 1969–2009)
- Former affiliations: Independent (1969−1970); NBC (1970–1985)
- Call sign meaning: "We're Your Mountain Television"

Technical information
- Licensing authority: FCC
- Facility ID: 24915
- ERP: 50 kW
- HAAT: 478 m (1,568 ft)
- Transmitter coordinates: 37°11′38″N 83°10′52″W

Links
- Public license information: Public file; LMS
- Website: www.wymt.com

WYMT-TV (channel 57) is a television station licensed to Hazard, Kentucky, United States, serving as the CBS affiliate for the Eastern Kentucky Coalfield region. Owned by Gray Media, the station maintains studios on Black Gold Boulevard off the KY 15 bypass in Hazard, and its transmitter is located south of the city in the Perry County community of Viper.

Although identifying as a separate station in its own right, WYMT is actually considered a semi-satellite of WKYT-TV (channel 27) in Lexington. As such, it clears all network programming as provided through its parent station but airs a separate offering of syndicated programming; there are also separate morning and weeknight newscasts, commercial inserts and legal station identifications. Master control and some internal operations are based at WKYT's facilities on Winchester Road in Lexington.

== History ==
=== As an NBC affiliate ===
The station began broadcasting on UHF channel 57 as WKYH-TV (meaning "Kentucky, Hazard") on October 20, 1969. It initially operated as an independent station until it acquired an NBC affiliation in 1970. With the station's founding, Hazard became one of the smallest towns in the nation with its own television station as the town had a population of 5,000 at that time. Initially, WKYH maintained studios in downtown Hazard, and transmitted its signal from a tower located at the headquarters of the local cable system.

Prior to its inception, some counties in southeastern Kentucky were among the last remaining parts of the United States that were unable to clearly receive a commercial television signal over the air. The Kentucky Educational Television network had set up locally based WKHA (channel 35) the year before; as such, it represented a highly unusual instance where the signal of an educational television station was made available to an audience before that of a commercial broadcaster. Although this area is considered part of the Lexington market, none of that city's television signals covered the area at the time. Lexington was an all-UHF market, and UHF stations do not get good reception in rugged terrain even in the best conditions. This part of Appalachia has long been one of the poorest in the nation, and many people still could not afford to buy a television set. Such conditions made the Lexington stations unwilling to set up even low-power translators in this area. Instead, WKYH was founded by local businessman Bill Gorman, who had built and owned the Hazard-area cable television company, complete with a closed-circuit local-access channel since 1965. Gorman's source of inspiration to apply to operate the station came in the form of a CBS news story, The Hungry American, which he considered a negative portrayal of life in the mountains. Gorman would also serve as mayor of Hazard from 1978 until his death in October 2010.

At the beginning of the station's life, Martin Ogrosky served as news director and in other positions along with William "Bill" Helton, William "Bill" Gorman Jr., and others.

In keeping with the region's strong musical traditions, country, bluegrass, and Southern gospel music constituted a good part of WKYH's early local programs. These shows lasted well into the 1980s (in the case of the Goins Brothers, as late as 1994), even after country music programs had fallen out of favor on other Southern stations. Religious programming from local ministers and churches was shown almost daily in the early years as well, not just on Sundays as was the norm elsewhere then.

Throughout its entire run as WKYH, the station's on-air look was very primitive, even by small-market standards. Much of its equipment had been bought as surplus from other stations and was usually in a poor state of repair after as much as two decades of use. This was especially true of the transmitter; in June 1980, the station was forced off the air for more than two weeks after the transmitter's klystron tubes failed. The tubes were replaced by the following month, after engineers purchased and hauled a set of replacement klystron tubes from General Electric's headquarters in Schenectady, New York, in order for the station to return to the air. It was only through this event that the station management learned how many people relied on WKYH as it was considered to be too small a station to be its own market by Arbitron or Nielsen, or have its own programming listings published in TV Guide. The repairs were not enough to keep the station's signal from deteriorating to the point of unacceptability; by 1981, it barely reached areas outside of Hazard's city limits. Video clips of the station's newscasts and commercials from the early 1980s, as well as a nightly sign-off clip from its final weeks as an NBC affiliate provided evidence of WKYH's shaky signal quality; those were the only known video recordings of the station's run as WKYH. The station did not even have a character generator for its newscasts. NBC refused to provide a network feed, believing that it was not worth the trouble and cost to provide one for a station with such a small coverage area. Station engineers were forced to rely on microwave links from WLEX-TV in Lexington and WCYB-TV in Bristol, Virginia (from the Tri-Cities market), for network programming. WCYB was used as a backup in case WLEX preempted an NBC show to show local programming. Whenever the microwave system failed, WKYH was forced to switch to and from WLEX or WCYB's signal, usually with less-than-satisfactory results. When this happened, WKYH sometimes aired WLEX or WCYB's commercials or station IDs when it was unable to cover them up in time. As such, the station never thrived, even when cable television arrived in the area. This situation allowed WKYH to relate to its affiliated network during the period when NBC was presided over by Fred Silverman.

=== New ownership to present ===
In May 1985, Gorman sold the station to Bluegrass Broadcasting, a unit of Kentucky Central Insurance Company, then owner of WKYT, for an estimated $1 million; the sale was approved the following month. The sale came after the FCC instituted new restrictions on stations that were co-owned with cable television systems; Gorman retained the cable system. After approval of the sale, the new owners changed the call sign on the morning of Saturday, October 19 of that year to the current WYMT, meaning "We're Your Mountain Television". WYMT's then-new owner also changed the station's network affiliation to CBS to match that of WKYT. With wealthier ownership, WYMT got a significant facelift, complete with a new studio, a more powerful transmitter on Buffalo Mountain, and a more modern on-air look. When Kentucky Central went bankrupt in 1993, WYMT and WKYT were bought by Gray Communications (now Gray Media, the current owner).

In 2004, WYMT's digital television companion was assigned VHF channel 12 as its final transmission frequency. Over-the-air viewers actually benefited from the switch; since VHF signals "bend" over mountainous terrain better than UHF, switching to digital not only improved WYMT's signal, but made reception available over a larger area than was previously available, even after the FCC-mandated digital transition of 2009. For several years after, non-HD programming aired stretched out until technical upgrades allowed those programs to air in HD. As of February 17, 2009, WYMT broadcasts exclusively in digital.

WYMT remains the only full-power commercial station in Hazard; cable or satellite television is necessary to receive any other major commercial network affiliates. WYMT is not carried on satellite television, because Hazard is part of the Lexington market; since satellite providers have a right not to carry a duplicate network affiliate in the same market due to bandwidth limitations, WKYT is the sole CBS station available on satellite. Gray Television applied to the FCC to carve out a unique satellite carriage area for WYMT alone, including the easternmost portion of the Lexington market and Kentucky counties assigned to the Tri-Cities, Knoxville, and Charleston–Huntington markets. DirecTV and Dish Network argued it would be technically and economically infeasible, as they would be required to create a new spot beam for this particular area, and cited their right to refuse carriage. The FCC agreed with the satellite companies, and ruled against Gray on May 16, 2018.

=== WYMT-DT2 ===
WYMT-DT2's former logo.

In 2009, WYMT-DT2 was launched as a standard-definition simulcast of WKYT. The simulcast ended on August 1, 2014, when the simulcast was replaced by the This TV network that provided classic movies and a few classic TV shows. Some additional syndicated programming was also broadcast on the DT2 subchannel. In early 2017, This TV was replaced with the Weigel Broadcasting-operated Heroes & Icons network.

== Programming ==
=== Sports programming ===
WYMT and WKYT regularly broadcast Kentucky Wildcats content, due partly to WKYT's status as the television flagship of the UK Sports Network (historically the Big Blue Sports Network), and, prior to 2024, due to the Southeastern Conference's broadcast contracts with CBS Sports. In addition to CBS Sports content, both WYMT and WKYT also broadcast the syndicated package of SEC college football and men's basketball games from Raycom Sports (formerly Jefferson-Pilot and Lincoln Financial Sports) from 1987 until 2009, when Raycom lost the SEC syndication rights. In 2009, the two stations began carrying the ESPN Plus-operated syndication service SEC TV (formerly SEC Network), which ceased operations in 2014 because of the launch of the new SEC Network, which is the cable- and satellite-only channel operated by ESPN.

From 2014 to 2019, WYMT-DT2 served as the local home of Raycom's ACC Network, the syndicated package of Atlantic Coast Conference football and basketball. This ended with the launch of ESPN's pay TV-only ACC Network in August 2019.

=== Locally produced programs ===
- Appalachian Wireless Sports Overtime
- Issues & Answers: The Mountain Edition
- Sports Overtime Saturday Night

=== Newscasts ===
In the 1970s and 1980s as WKYH, its newscasts were known as 57 NewsService.

The first newscast as WYMT was broadcast on the evening of October 21, 1985. Currently during the week, WYMT produces separate morning, 5:30, 6, and 11 p.m. newscasts on weekdays. It simulcasts WKYT's weekday noon, 4, 4:30, and 5 p.m. broadcasts; and WKYT's weekend newscasts. Although WKYT has been airing newscasts in high definition since April 11, 2007, WYMT simulcast them in standard definition until a master control upgrade in 2022. In addition to its main studios, WYMT operates a news bureau in downtown Pikeville.

WYMT also acts as WKYT's news bureau in the Eastern Kentucky Coalfields region; a number of WKYT reporters appear on WYMT. Indeed, WKYT is the only commercial station with any presence at all in this part of the market.

In WYMT weather segments, it uses regional National Weather Service radar data presented on-screen in a system called "Live Pinpoint Doppler". WKYT at one time operated its own weather radar called "Live First Alert Defender". Sports Overtime is WYMT's weekly sports show that airs on Friday nights from August to April which covers high school athletics. A Saturday edition focusing on college sports aired from 2006 to 2008, and returned in 2013 with the return of weekend news. On April 15, 2014, the station began broadcasting its newscasts in HD, using robotic HD cameras, and introducing new graphics and music.

==== Notable former on-air staff ====
- Jay Crawford (creator of Sports Overtime on WYMT)

== Technical information and subchannels ==
WYMT-TV's transmitter is located in Viper, south of Hazard. The station's signal is multiplexed:

Subchannels of WYMT-TV
Subchannel	Res.	Short name	Programming
57.1	1080i	WYMT-TV	CBS
57.2	720p	H&I	Heroes & Icons
57.3	480i	Outlaw	Outlaw

=== Analog-to-digital conversion ===
WYMT-TV shut down its analog signal, over UHF channel 57, on February 17, 2009, the original target date on which full-power television stations in the United States were to transition from analog to digital broadcasts under federal mandate (which was later pushed back to June 12, 2009). The station's digital signal remained on its pre-transition VHF channel 12, using virtual channel 57.

== WYMT coverage area ==
WYMT serves 20 counties in the eastern part of Kentucky. It also serves several counties in southwest Virginia and western West Virginia, and appears on cable television in Claiborne County, Tennessee. It primarily serves the eight easternmost counties of the Lexington market (including Perry County, home to Hazard itself). However, its claimed coverage area includes portions of three additional DMAs. The easternmost counties (Pike, Floyd, Martin, Johnson, and Lawrence) are in the Huntington–Charleston, West Virginia market (home territory for sister station and NBC affiliate WSAZ-TV). Letcher and Leslie counties in Kentucky, along with three county-level jurisdictions in Virginia—Wise and Dickenson counties and the independent city of Norton—are in the Tri-Cities, Tennessee–Virginia DMA. WYMT also claims Bell, Harlan, and McCreary counties as part of its coverage area, these are part of the Knoxville market (home territory for sister station and fellow CBS affiliate WVLT-TV).
