= WLAP =

Radio station in Lexington, Kentucky

- Lexington, Kentucky; United States
- Broadcast area: Lexington Metro Area; Central Kentucky
- Frequency: 630 kHz
- Branding: Newsradio 630 WLAP

Programming
- Format: News/talk
- Affiliations: ABC News Radio; Premiere Networks; Compass Media Networks; UK Sports Network

Ownership
- Owner: iHeartMedia, Inc.; (iHM Licenses, LLC)
- Sister stations: WBUL-FM; WKQQ; WLKT; WMXL; WWTF

History
- First air date: September 15, 1922; 103 years ago (in Louisville, moved to Lexington on March 17, 1934)

Technical information
- Licensing authority: FCC
- Facility ID: 68209
- Class: B
- Power: 5,000 watts day; 1,000 watts night
- Transmitter coordinates: 38°7′25.3″N 84°26′44.8″W
- Repeater: 94.5 WMXL-HD2 (Lexington)

Links
- Public license information: Public file; LMS
- Webcast: Listen live (via iHeartRadio)
- Website: wlap.iheart.com

WLAP (630 AM) is a commercial radio station in Lexington, Kentucky, serving the Central Kentucky region. It airs a news/talk format and is owned by iHeartMedia, Inc. The studios and offices are on Nicolasville Road in Lexington.

By day, WLAP transmits with 5,000 watts. To protect other stations on AM 630 at night when radio waves travel further, WLAP reduces power to 1,000 watts. A directional antenna is used at all times. The transmitter is on Russell Cave Road in Lexington. WLAP has a four-tower array.

== History ==
=== Early years ===
WLAP's first broadcast occurred on September 15, 1922. The station was founded by William Virgil Jordan of Louisville, who had become involved in amateur radio. By 1920, he was operating an amateur station with the call sign 9LK. Jordan reportedly started broadcasting phonograph records to patients at Waverly Hills Hospital in 1921.

Initially there were no restrictions on amateur stations making broadcasts intended for the general public. However, effective December 1, 1921, the United States Department of Commerce, which regulated radio communication at this time, adopted regulations to formally establish two broadcasting frequencies. It set aside the wavelength of 360 meters (833 kHz) for "entertainment" broadcasting, and 485 meters (619 kHz) for "market and weather reports". On September 15, 1922, Jordan was granted a broadcasting station license with the sequentially issued call letters of WLAP, for operation on 360 meters. The station was originally located at Jordan's "Big Six Auto Repair Shop" at 306 West Breckenridge Street. WLAP was the fourth Kentucky radio station licensed under the new broadcasting station regulations, preceded in July by WHAS in Louisville and WIAR in Paducah and in August by WKAG, Louisville.

=== CBS affiliation ===
In 1926, Rev. Lloyd Benedict arranged for the Virginia Avenue Baptist Church to purchase WLAP, and the station and transmitter were relocated to 2600 Virginia Avenue. In 1929 the station was sold to the American Broadcasting Company of Kentucky. It was headed by Denwidie Lampton Sr., who funded major upgrades as the studios were moved to the Inter Southern Life Building at 1st and Ormsby Avenue. New transmitting facilities were built at Phillips Lane.

WLAP became a network affiliate of the Columbia Broadcasting System (later CBS). It carried the network's dramas, comedies, news, sports, soap operas, game shows and big band broadcasts. The station was noted for its remote broadcasts, including the 1929 Kentucky State Fair, the dedication of War Memorial Auditorium, and the opening of the Municipal Bridge, where President Herbert Hoover spoke.

=== Ownership changes ===
Rival station WHAS desired an affiliation with CBS, and arranged for WBBM Chicago owner Ralph Atlass to purchase WLAP from Lampton, who had had many battles with the Bingham family over their desire to own two stations in the Louisville market. Atlass then sold the station to George Norton Jr. with the provision that WLAP would be operated without network affiliation.

WLAP studios were relocated to the Speed Building, where many future stars performed. They including Lonesome Luke and the Farm boys, Cliff and Bill Carsile, The Atcher Family Band, which included Bob and Randall, and the Stewart Brothers.

=== Move to Lexington ===
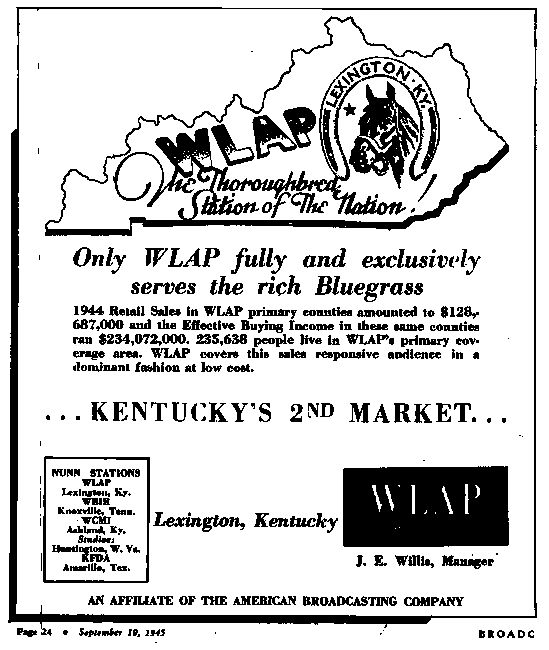
1945 station advertisement

In 1931, WFIW (now WGTK) in Hopkinsville, Kentucky, applied to move to Louisville. This was contested by WLAP owner George Norton Jr., who sought not only to block the move, but also filed a competing application requesting that the Federal Radio Commission (FRC) delete WFIW and reassign its then vacated frequency to WLAP. The FRC approved WFIW's move to Louisville and denied WLAP's deletion request, so WLAP appealed this decision to District Court. Ultimately a settlement was worked out. George Norton purchased WFIW, changing its call letters to WAVE, and had his engineer, Wilbur Hudson, move the station to Louisville in late November 1933. WAVE signed on in Louisville on December 30, 1933. Meanwhile, Norton sold WLAP to Turner C. Rush and Alvin L. Witt, who planned to move that station to Lexington. WLAP had signed off for the last time from Louisville on December 23, 1933, after the FRC granted preliminary approval for the move. Final permission was granted on January 5, 1934, and WLAP went back on the air in Lexington with Program Tests on March 17, 1934.

On March 5, 1948, the Federal Communications Commission (FCC) approved WLAP's application to move from 1450 kHz to 630 kHz, along with a power increase from 250 watts (full-time) to 5,000 watts (daytime) and 1,000 watts (night). In January 1957, the FCC approved the sale of the radio station, along with the construction permit for a TV station to the Community Broadcasting Company, whose principals were Frederick Gregg Jr., Harry Feingold, and Charles Wright.

=== Top 40 to AC to talk ===
WLAP aired a Top 40 music format during the 1960s and 1970s. Then as contemporary music listening moved to FM, WLAP switched to a full service, Adult Contemporary direction by the late 1970s. The Top 40 format had shifted to its sister station 94.5 WLAP-FM (now WMXL).

WLAP was the first station in the Lexington area to utilize a generator for emergency broadcasting purposes, which served the station well during the Super Outbreak of April 3, 1974, when tornadoes disrupted electrical service to much of the state of Kentucky and WLAP was the only radio station in Lexington able to stay on the air thanks to its generator.

As listening to music declined on AM radio, WLAP added more talk shows to its schedule in the 1990s, eventually making the transition to a full-time talk outlet.

== Programming ==
Most programs on WLAP are nationally syndicated conservative talk shows. Weekdays begin with This Morning, America's First News with Gordon Deal. Also heard are The Clay Travis and Buck Sexton Show, Sean Hannity, Glenn Beck, Ground Zero with Clyde Lewis and Coast to Coast AM with George Noory. On weekends, shows on money, health, home repair and law are heard. Hosts include Bill Handel, Gary Sullivan, Joe Pags and Bill Cunningham. Most hours begin with an update from ABC News Radio.

Three sports shows are heard on weekdays, The Leach Report and Kentucky Sports Radio in late mornings and Big Blue Insider in early evenings. Sports also makes up part of the Sunday schedule. WLAP serves as the flagship station of the UK Sports Network, which carries University of Kentucky Wildcats football and basketball. To make up for shortfalls in WLAP's coverage, some games are simulcast on FM sister station WBUL-FM (98.1 MHz).
