= WVLK (AM) =

- Lexington, Kentucky; United States
- Broadcast area: Lexington Metro Area; Central Kentucky
- Frequency: 590 kHz
- Branding: News Talk 97.3 FM WVLK

Programming
- Format: News/talk
- Network: Fox News Radio
- Affiliations: Compass Media Networks; Genesis Communications Network; USA Radio Network; Westwood One; UK Sports Network

Ownership
- Owner: Cumulus Media; (Cumulus Licensing LLC)
- Sister stations: WLXX; WLTO; WXZZ; WVLK-FM

History
- First air date: November 26, 1947; 78 years ago
- Call sign meaning: "Versailles, Lexington, Kentucky"

Technical information
- Licensing authority: FCC
- Facility ID: 27418
- Class: B
- Power: 5,000 watts day; 1,000 watts night
- Transmitter coordinates: 38°6′42.3″N 84°34′38.8″W
- Translator: 97.3 W247CT (Lexington)

Links
- Public license information: Public file; LMS
- Webcast: Listen live
- Website: www.wvlkam.com

WVLK (590 kHz) is a commercial AM radio station in Lexington, Kentucky. It is owned by Cumulus Media and airs a news/talk format. The studios are inside Kincaid Towers on West Vine Street in downtown Lexington.

By day, WVLK is powered at 5,000 watts. At night, to protect other stations on 590 AM from interference, power is reduced to 1,000 watts. The station uses a directional antenna with a four-tower array. The transmitter is on Leestown Road (U.S. Route 421) in the northwest part of Lexington. Programming is also heard on 250-watt FM translator W247CT on 97.3 MHz in Lexington.

== Programming ==
Weekdays on WVLK begin with Lexington's Morning News with Jack Pattie. Two other local programs are heard on weekdays, Larry Glover Live in early afternoons and Kruser & Krew in late afternoons. The rest of the schedule is nationally syndicated programs, mostly from co-owned Westwood One: The Chris Plante Show, The Mark Levin Show, The Ben Shapiro Show, The Matt Walsh Show, America in the Morning and Red Eye Radio.

Weekends feature specialty shows on money, health, gardening, movies, real estate, travel, technology, food and wine. Syndicated programs include The Kim Komando Show and repeats of some weekday shows. Most hours begin with an update from Fox News Radio.

== History ==
=== Early years ===
WVLK signed on the air on November 26, 1947. Its original city of license was Versailles, Kentucky. It was powered at 1,000 watts and was a network affiliate of the Mutual Broadcasting System, carrying its news, sports, dramas and comedies during the "Golden Age of Radio". WVLK was owned by Bluegrass Broadcasting Company, whose president was former governor and U.S. Senator A.B. Chandler. Offices were originally in Versailles, with an additional office in Lexington.

In 1951, the offices and studios were moved to Lexington, first to the Lafayette Hotel. The studios were later relocated to the Phoenix Hotel on Main Street in downtown.

=== Top 40, MOR, AC ===
In the 1960s, WVLK became a Top 40 station, playing the top hits of the day. But by the 1980s, most young people had shifted from AM to FM stations for their music. In 1981, WVLK shifted to middle of the road music, with news and sports. By the late 80s, the music tempo was stepped up to adult contemporary music.

From 1968 until the 1990s, WVLK was the flagship radio station of the University of Kentucky Wildcats men's basketball and football games. They were broadcast from the UK Sports Radio Network. Before that network was established, stations had to produce their own individual broadcasts of Kentucky Wildcats football and basketball games, and WVLK and WLAP 630 AM were the primary Lexington-area radio outlets for the games before the network began.

Logo used before 97.3 FM translator W247CT signed on

=== FM simulcasts ===
In 2015, WVLK signed on an FM translator station, W266AN in Lawrenceburg, at 101.1 MHz. On June 20, W266AN was forced off the air due to interference with WSGS in the Central Kentucky area. Effective June 13, 2017, the translator was licensed to Lexington at 97.3 FM, as W247CT.

On January 1, 2020, WVLK began simulcasting on WCYN-FM 102.3. The simulcast on WCYN-FM ended a year later.

== Coverage area ==
The station's AM signal provides at least secondary coverage to most of central Kentucky, as well as parts of the Louisville radio market, and as far south as the Lake Cumberland area.

== Early voices ==
Among the early voices at WVLK, US Representative Harold Rogers was a disc jockey at the station in 1959, while he was a student at the University of Kentucky.

During the period from 1959 through 1963, the DJ 'crew' at WVLK included Arty Kay, Bob McDonald, Jim Chadwick, Sam Combs, Charles Lancaster, Jim Richmond, and Darrel Evans. At that time, WVLK was a longtime Top 40 station, and was the highest-rated station in the market, with more listeners than all of the other stations combined (Pulse, Hooper, Nielson ratings). The sportscaster (both HS and UK sports) was Claude Sullivan.<Jim Chadwick>
