= WVLK-FM =

- Lexington, Kentucky; United States
- Broadcast area: Lexington Metro Area; Central Kentucky
- Frequency: 92.9 MHz
- Branding: K 92.9

Programming
- Format: Country
- Affiliations: Westwood One

Ownership
- Owner: Cumulus Media; (Cumulus Licensing LLC)
- Sister stations: WLXX; WLTO; WVLK; WXZZ

History
- First air date: 1962; 64 years ago (as WVLK-FM)
- Former call signs: WVLK-FM (1961–2003); WLXX (2003–2020)
- Call sign meaning: "Versailles, Lexington, Kentucky"

Technical information
- Licensing authority: FCC
- Facility ID: 27417
- Class: C1
- ERP: 100,000 watts
- HAAT: 259 meters (850 ft)
- Transmitter coordinates: 38°2′22.2″N 84°24′10.7″W

Links
- Public license information: Public file; LMS
- Webcast: Listen live
- Website: www.k929fm.com

WVLK-FM (92.9 MHz) is a commercial radio station broadcasting a country music radio format. Licensed to Lexington, Kentucky, and owned by Cumulus Media, the station serves the Bluegrass region of Central Kentucky. The station's studios and offices are located inside Kincaid Towers in downtown Lexington.

WVLK-FM has an effective radiated power (ERP) of 100,000 watts, the maximum for non-grandfathered FM stations. The transmitter is along Winchester Road (U.S. Route 60). With a nearly 100-mile radius coverage area, it can be picked up in the Louisville metropolitan area in the west and Morehead to the east. It can also be received in the Northern Kentucky suburbs of Cincinnati and as far south as Corbin.

== History ==
=== Beautiful music and country ===
The station was first licensed as WVLK-FM on March 9, 1962. It began as a beautiful music station, playing 15 minute sweeps of mostly instrumental cover versions of popular songs. It was owned by WVLK Radio, Inc., along with its sister station, WVLK (590 AM).

In the 1980s, the station switched to country music but still kept its WVLK-FM call letters. On September 29, 2003, the station changed its call sign to WLXX. It wanted to establish an identity separate from the AM station.

=== Nash-FM ===
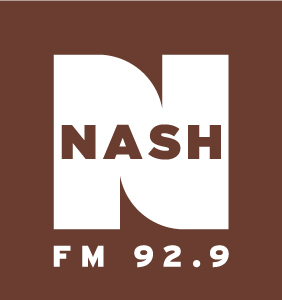
Logo under previous "Nash FM" branding

On May 24, 2013, at 12 p.m., WLXX rebranded as "Nash FM 92.9". "Nash FM" is part of parent company Cumulus Media's national branding for many of its country music stations as well as publications and other platforms.

On September 4, 2020, WLXX changed its call letters back to WVLK-FM. It dropped "Nash FM" and rebranded to "K 92.9", bringing back its heritage brand after 16 years. The WLXX call sign moved to a sister station on 101.5, which had been WVLK-FM since 2007.
