= Triangle Center =

Building complex in Lexington, Kentucky

Coordinates: 38°02′55″N 84°29′57″W

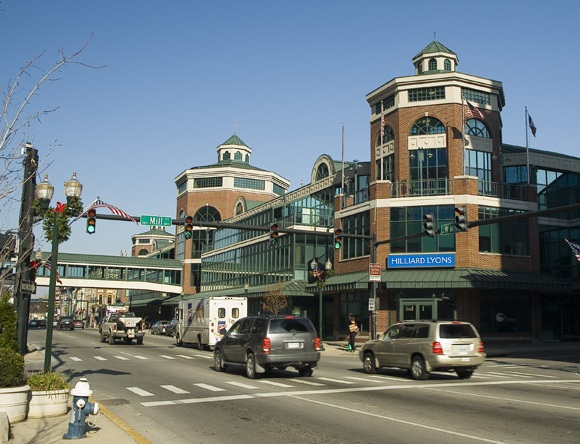
The Triangle Center as seen along West Main Street.

The Triangle Center is primarily an office complex with several restaurants and a coffee shop in downtown Lexington, Kentucky. Originally envisioned as a shopping and dining complex bound by Broadway, East Main and South Mill Streets, it was constructed by the Webb Cos, to complement adjacent Victorian Square which had opened only one year prior.

It was first announced on October 1, 1984, by the Webb Cos. as a "festival marketplace" with boutiques, shops, and food kiosks. The Festival Marketplace, as it was first named, was a combined effort by the developer with the Lexington Financial Center to replace the failed Galleria project. It was to be modeled after Harborplace in Baltimore, Maryland, The Waterside in Norfolk, Virginia, Faneuil Hall Marketplace in Boston, Massachusetts and Toledo, Ohio's Portside.

The open-air yet enclosed 114,000 sq ft (10,600 m^{2}). structure would contain numerous small shops, a food court with a common dining area and a restaurant or a nightclub. A farmers market was also considered as a tenant.

In addition to the marketplace, $7.5 million in state aid was announced by then-Governor Martha Layne Collins towards the construction of a six-level parking structure that would serve Festival Marketplace and the Lexington Financial Center.

== See also ==
- Cityscape of Lexington, Kentucky
