= Lexington–Fayette metropolitan area =

Coordinates: 38°00′N 84°30′W

Lexington-Fayette Metropolitan Area
- Metropolitan Area
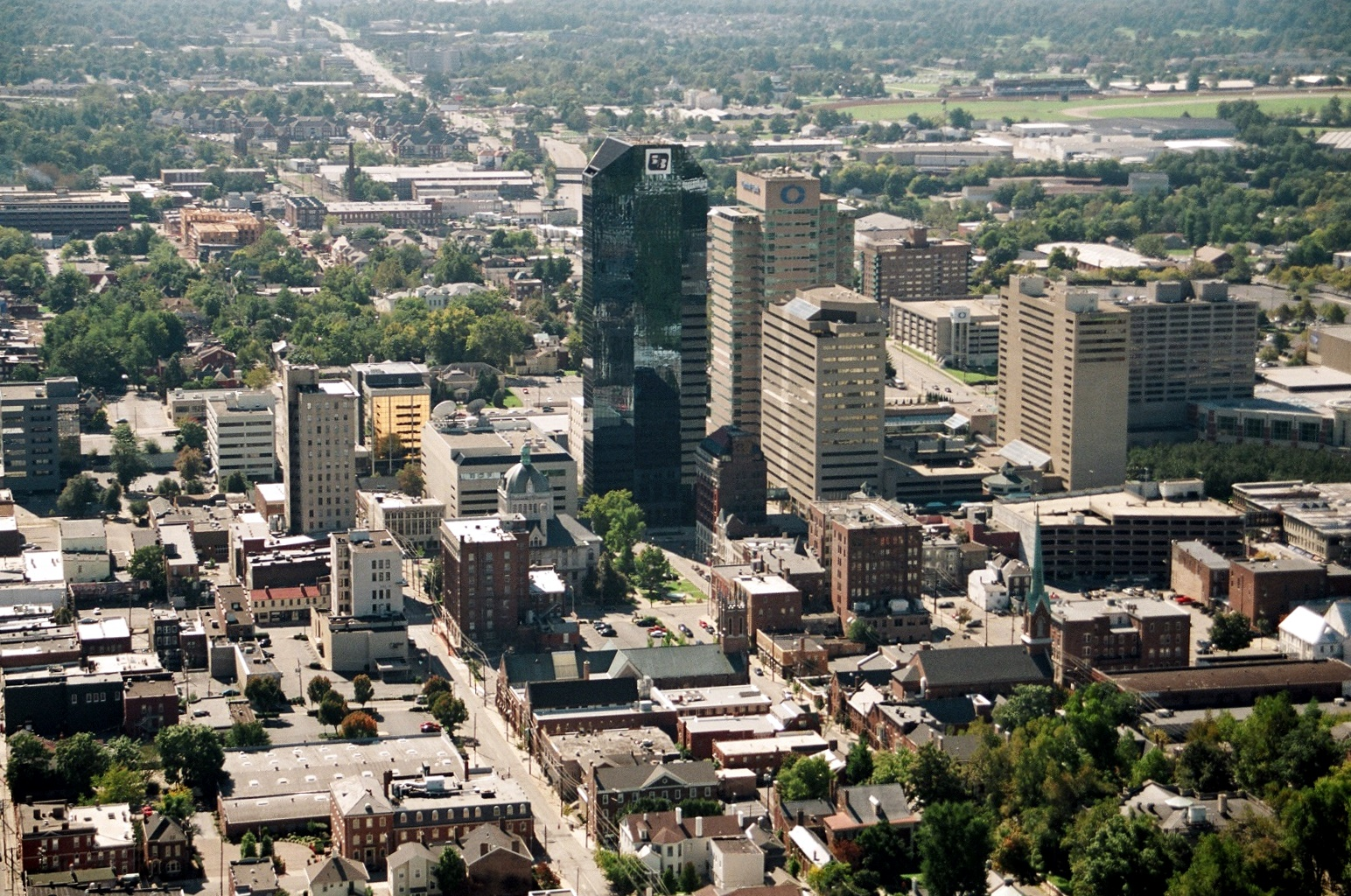
- Lexington skyline
Map of Lexington-Fayette–Frankfort–Richmond, KY CSA
City of Lexington
Lexington-Fayette MSA
Richmond–Berea µSA
Frankfort µSA
Mount Sterling µSA
- Country: United States
- State: Kentucky
- Largest city: Lexington

Area
  - MSA: 1,484.07 sq mi (3,843.7 km^{2})

Population (2020)
  - Total: 516,811 ▲(109th)

GDP
  - Total: $35.670 billion (2022)
- Time zone: UTC−5 (EST)
  - Summer (DST): UTC−4 (EDT)
- Area codes: 859, 502

The Lexington-Fayette metropolitan area is the 109th-largest metropolitan statistical area (MSA) in the United States. It was originally formed by the United States Census Bureau in 1950 and consisted solely of Fayette County until 1980, when surrounding counties saw increases in their population densities and the number of their residents employed within Lexington-Fayette, which led to them meeting Census criteria to be added to the MSA.

The Lexington-Fayette MSA is the primary MSA of the Lexington-Fayette–Richmond–Frankfort, KY combined statistical area which includes the Micropolitan Statistical Areas of Frankfort (Franklin and Anderson counties), Mount Sterling (Montgomery, Bath, and Menifee counties), and Richmond–Berea (Madison and Rockcastle counties). The Lexington-Fayette–Frankfort–Richmond, KY combined statistical area has a July 1, 2012 Census Bureau estimated population of 703,271.

== Demographics ==
=== Cities ===
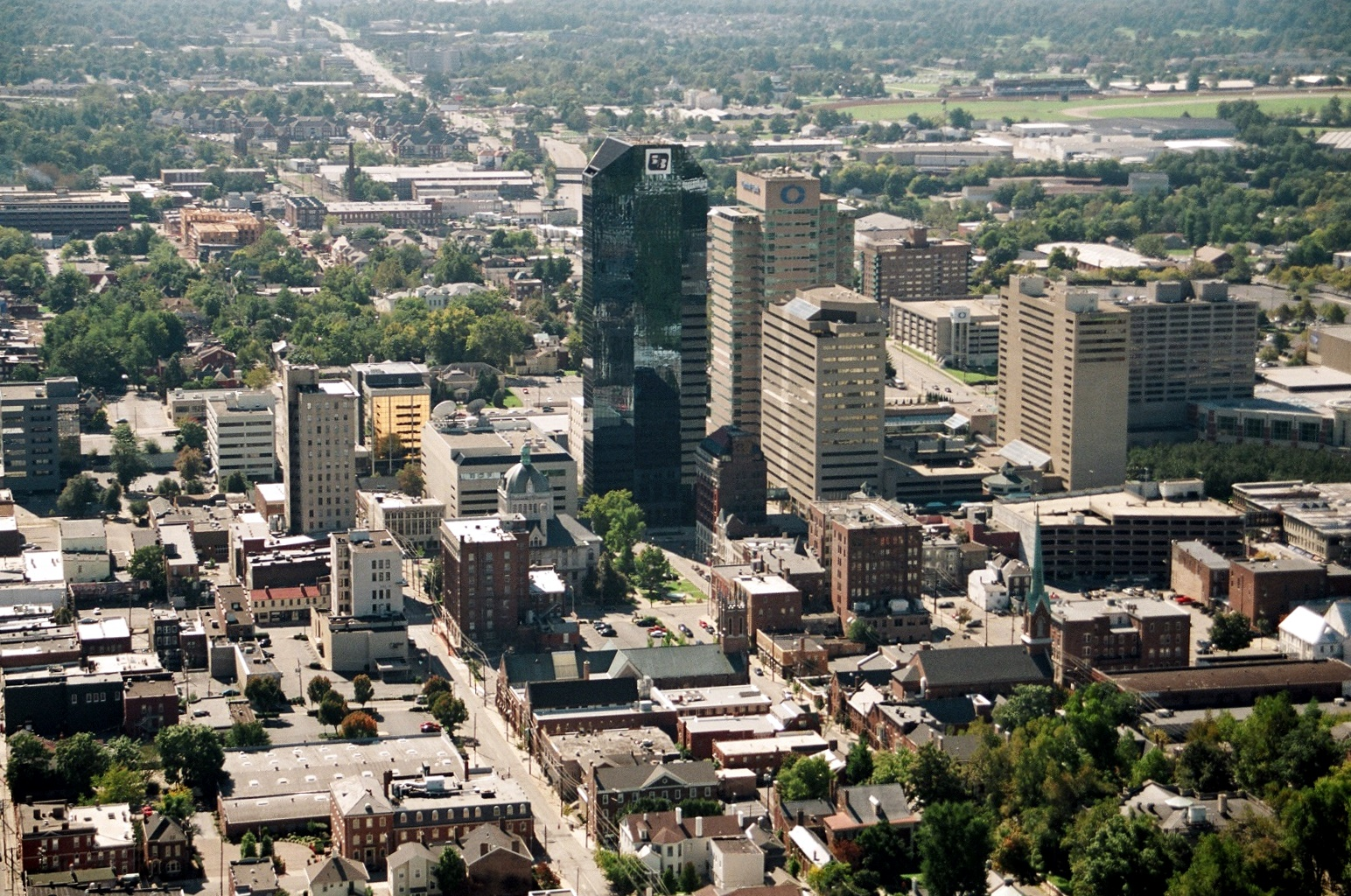
Lexington is the principal city of the metropolitan area

The following is a list of cities in the Lexington-Fayette metropolitan area with 2021 United States Census Bureau estimates of their population. Principal cities of the metropolitan area are considered by the Census Bureau to represent significant employment centers:

Principal city

- Lexington – 321,793

Municipalities with more than 10,000 people

- Georgetown – 37,730
- Nicholasville – 31,490
- Winchester – 19,071
- Versailles – 10,431
- Paris – 10,209

Municipalities with fewer than 10,000 people

- Wilmore – 6,027
- Midway – 1,690
- Stamping Ground – 796
- Millersburg – 744
- North Middletown – 603
- Sadieville – 326
- Corinth – 229

=== Counties ===
Geographic Area	2020 census	2010 census	2000 census	1990 census	1980 census	1970 census	1960 census	1950 census
Lexington-Fayette MSA	516,811	472,099	408,326	348,428	317,629	174,323	131,906	100,746
Bourbon	20,252	19,985	19,360	19,236	19,405	18,476¹	18,178¹	17,752¹
Clark	36,972	35,613	33,144	29,496	28,322	24,090¹	21,075¹	18,898¹
Fayette	322,570	295,803	260,512	225,366	204,165	174,323	131,906	100,746
Jessamine	52,991	48,586	39,041	30,508	26,146	17,430¹	13,625¹	12,458¹
Scott	57,155	47,173	33,061	23,867	21,813	19,948¹	15,376¹	15,141¹
Woodford	26,871	24,939	23,208	19,955	17,778	14,434¹	11,913¹	11,212¹

• Populations are based on published estimates by the United States Bureau of the Census.

¹County was not a part of Lexington-Fayette MSA at the time of this Census and the county's population is not included in MSA total.
