= East Kentucky Broadcasting =

Former radio broadcasting company in Kentucky, United States

East Kentucky Broadcasting was a network of radio stations serving the Eastern Kentucky area.

== History ==
On December 23, 1948, articles of incorporation were drafted to create a new radio station in Pikeville, Kentucky. This radio station became WPKE. On July 31, 1949, the first broadcast from WPKE was transmitted at 250 watts.

During the early 1950s, Jack Hatcher bought out stockholders O.T. Hinton, Mitchell Preston, Alvis P. Keene, Dr. O.W. Thompson, Clyde Childers and Edward Venters, becoming the sole owner of the radio station. Burton Robinson, the business manager of WPKE, hired 16-year-old Walter E. May as the first rock and roll disc jockey. After his death in 1960, his heirs sold all of the controlling stock to three men from Morehead, Kentucky.

Two years after the death of Hatcher, May bought a third of the company, and was subsequently named general manager of East Kentucky Broadcasting. May increased the transmittal power of WPKE from its original 250 watts to 1,000 watts. In 1965, two businessmen from Pikeville bought the remaining two-thirds of WPKE, organized by May. May then bought some stock from both businessmen, bringing his total interest in the company to 50%. The remaining stock was owned by five other businessmen, Henry Stratton, Hobert Clay Johnson, C.D. Roberts, Herman G. Dotson, and T.T. Colley, each with an equal 10% of the stock.

In 1966, Eastern Kentucky Broadcasting added another station, WPKE-FM, which later became WDHR. Between 1966 and 1980, EKB owned radio stations in Lexington, Hindman, Louisa, Nicholasville, Virgie, Prestonsburg, Coal Run, Jellico, Williamson, WV and Tennessee.

On July 16, 1969, Walter E. May provided live coverage of the Apollo 11 launch from Cape Canaveral.

Since 1990, Walter E. May had served as the mayor of Pikeville and president of the board of directors at Pikeville Medical Center (throughout the years, EKB has raised over $50,000 for the hospital), in addition to his duties as Founder of East Kentucky Broadcasting. Currently, day-to-day operations of East Kentucky Broadcasting is the responsibility of corporate vice presidents Christy May Adkins and Walt May II.

May died on November 1, 2018. Effective May 29, 2019, East Kentucky Broadcasting sold their entire portfolio of nine stations and five translators to Mountain Top Media LLC for $2.85 million.

== Former stations ==
Callsign	Location	Frequency
WDHR	Pikeville, KY	93.1 (FM)
WPKE-FM	Coal Run/Pikeville, KY	103.1 (FM)
WXCC	Williamson, WV	96.5 (FM)
WZLK	Virgie, KY/Pikeville, KY	107.5 (FM)
WLSI	Pikeville, KY	900 (AM)
WPRT	Prestonsburg, KY	960 (AM)
WPKE	Pikeville, KY	1240 (AM)
WBTH	Williamson, WV	1400 (AM)
WEKB	Elkhorn City, KY	1460 (AM)
