= WBTH =

Former simulcast of WLSI, Pikeville, Kentucky
- Williamson, West Virginia; United States
- Broadcast area: Central Mingo County, West Virginia; Northeastern Pike County, Kentucky
- Frequency: 1400 kHz
- Branding: Peace Radio

Programming
- Format: Contemporary Christian

Ownership
- Owner: Lynn Parrish; (Mountain Top Media LLC)
- Sister stations: WDHR; WEKB; WLSI; WPKE; WPKE-FM; WPRT; WXCC; WZLK

History
- First air date: 1939
- Last air date: July 2026
- Call sign meaning: Wagner, Booker, Taylor, Hogg (last names of original owners)

Technical information
- Licensing authority: FCC
- Facility ID: 26392
- Class: C
- Power: 1,000 watts unlimited
- Transmitter coordinates: 37°40′9″N 82°16′9″W
- Translator: 102.5 W273BC (Williamson)

Links
- Public license information: Public file; LMS
- Webcast: Listen live
- Website: peaceradiofm.com

WBTH (1400 AM) was a radio station licensed to serve Williamson, West Virginia, United States. The station, established in 1939, was owned and operated by licensee Mountain Top Media LLC, Cindy May Johnson Managing Member.

WBTH had broadcast a contemporary Christian format serving Williamson, Central Mingo County, West Virginia and Northeastern Pike County, Kentucky.

On July 13, 2026, the Federal Communications Commission granted Mountain Top Media's request for special temporary authority to allow WBTH to remain silent for 180 days due to a broken cable on the station's tower. The WBTH license was surrendered that September. It was cancelled on September 17.

== Call sign meaning ==
The call sign represented the first letters of the last name of the original owners of WBTH. Francis Wagner, William Booker, George Taylor, and William Hogg requested the WBTH call sign in 1939.
