= WPKE =

WPKE can refer to:

- WPKE (AM), a radio station (1240 AM) licensed to Pikeville, Kentucky, United States
- WPKE-FM, a radio station (103.1 FM) licensed to Coal Run, Kentucky, United States
