= EKB =

EKB may refer to:

- East Kentucky Broadcasting, an American television network
- Egyptian Knowledge Bank, an Egyptian educational database
- Ekibastuz Airport, in Kazakhstan
- Eskbank railway station, in Scotland
- National Housing Authority (Albania) (Albanian: Enti Kombëtar i Banesave)
- Yekaterinburg, a city in Russia
