= WRAU =

WRAU may refer to:

- WGBZ (FM) 88.3 MHz, Ocean City, Maryland — used the call sign WRAU from 2010 to June 2021
- WGNH 94.9 MHz, South Webster, Ohio — used the callsign WRAU from 2002 to 2004
- WRAZ-FM 106.3 MHz, Leisure City, Florida — used the callsign WRAU from March 2000 to July 2001
- WPKE-FM 103.1 MHz, Coal Run, Kentucky — used the callsign WRAU from 1990 to 1993
- WRZZ 106.1 MHz, Parkersburg, West Virginia — used the callsign WRAU from 1986 to 1988
- WHOI (TV) channel 19, Peoria, Illinois — used the callsign WRAU-TV from 1973 to 1985
