= WPRT =

WPRT may refer to:

- WPRT (AM), a radio station (960 AM) licensed to Prestonsburg, Kentucky, United States
- WPRT-FM, a radio station (102.5 FM) licensed to Pegram, Tennessee, United States
