= Demente =

Demente may refer to:

- Demente (song), a song by South Korean singer Chungha and Puerto Rican rapper Guaynaa
- Demente (TV series), a Chilean telenovela

== See also ==
- Demented (disambiguation)
