= Jim Runyon =

American radio disc jockey (1931-1973)

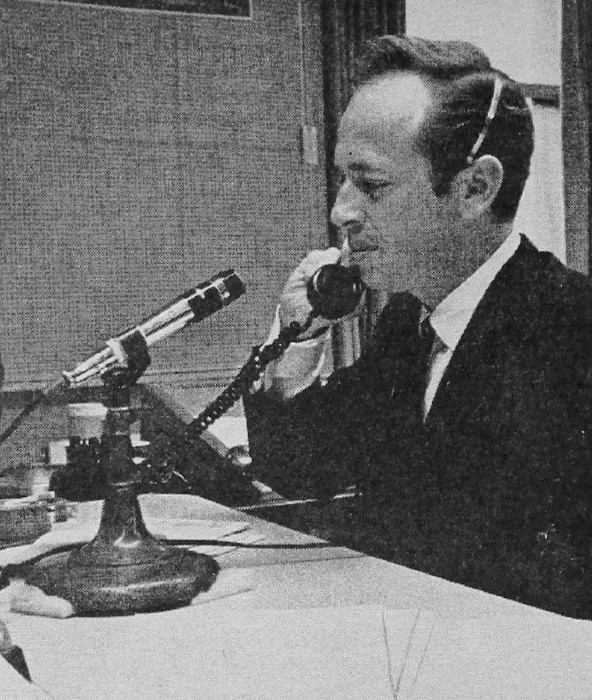
- Runyon in 1963
- Born: James Hamlet Runyon; January 8, 1931; Logan, West Virginia
- Died: April 13, 1973 (aged 42)
- Occupations: Radio announcer Disc jockey Actor
- Years active: 1951-1973
- Spouse: Jane Roberts
- Children: 3, including Jennifer

James Hamlet Runyon (January 8, 1931 – April 13, 1973) was an American radio announcer, disc jockey, and actor from the late 1950s to 1973. He was in plays at Cain Park, in Cleveland Hts. OH, in the early ‘70s.

== Early years ==
Runyon was born in Logan, West Virginia and grew up in Williamson, where his father owned a furniture store. He had an early interest in radio and started out as a janitor at a radio station in Welch, West Virginia. When the station's regular announcer did not arrive for work one Saturday morning, Runyon convinced the station manager to let him go on the air. This worked out to be a regular air shift for him until it was learned that he was only thirteen years old. The state's Child Welfare Department intervened, and Runyon had to leave the airwaves until his fourteenth birthday. Runyon went on the air at WBTH when his family moved to Williamson, where he attended high school.

Runyon won a scholarship at Marshall College in Huntington, West Virginia, but left college after six months. While attending college, Runyon worked nights for WHTN Radio. His studies were suffering because of his full-time job, so Runyon elected to leave school in favor of his radio work.

== Career ==
Runyon worked at several radio stations in West Virginia before serving in the United States Marine Corps during the Korean War. He was initially a correspondent but became a Marine recruiter assigned to the Miami, Florida area. While in Miami as a recruiter, Runyon also became part of a Marine unit there doing radio and television public service announcements. The unit included Ed McMahon, later of The Tonight Show Starring Johnny Carson. Following his discharge in 1951, he went to work at WLW in Cincinnati. Runyon also worked with Ruth Lyons at WLWT and was the host of "Studio 2", a weekday afternoon variety series. From 1954 to 1961, Runyon worked in Dayton at WLWD and Columbus, Ohio at WTVN, prior to his joining 1100 KYW, doing the midday airshift in Cleveland, Ohio.

In 1965, he moved to WCFL in Chicago. Runyon was the narrator (the "weeeellll" voice) of the Chickenman series which began on his program at WCFL in Chicago in 1966; Runyon also played several parts in the show. Runyon left WCFL for WHDH in Boston. Jim rejoined 1100 in Cleveland (now known as WKYC) as the morning show host, in October 1969, taking over the morning show. He kept the position when the station became WWWE in 1972. Runyon was also the host of a weekly talent show program, The Gene Carroll Show With Jim Runyon, on WEWS-TV. He had been with the television program since May, 1972.

== Death ==
Runyon announced his resignation from WWWE on March 15, 1973, because of health concerns; his health also forced him to resign from WEWS-TV. Runyon had been frequently hospitalized and told WWWE management to look for a replacement, as he doubted he would be able to return to the air, and suggested Larry Morrow. Weeks later, he died of leukemia at the age of 42. He was survived by his wife, actress Jane Roberts, who had performed with him in Chickenman, their daughter Jennifer Runyon (1960-2026), a film and television actress, and two sons, David and Scott, from previous marriages.

Runyon's memory was honored at a special Cleveland Indians game at Cleveland Municipal Stadium on May 4, 1973, with proceeds going to the American Cancer Society. Two days before his death, Runyon had agreed to participate in the fund raiser to be held in May.
