= Number One with a Bullet (film) =

1987 film by Jack Smight

- Theatrical release poster
- Directed by: Jack Smight
- Written by: Gail Morgan Hickman; Andrew Kurtzman; Rob Riley; James Belushi
- Produced by: Yoram Globus; Menahem Golan
- Starring: Robert Carradine; Billy Dee Williams; Valerie Bertinelli; Peter Graves; Doris Roberts
- Cinematography: Alex Phillips, Jr.
- Edited by: Michael J. Duthie
- Music by: Alf Clausen
- Distributed by: The Cannon Group
- Release date: February 27, 1987
- Running time: 103 minutes
- Country: United States
- Language: English
- Box office: $410,952

Number One with a Bullet is a 1987 American action comedy film directed by Jack Smight and starring Robert Carradine, Billy Dee Williams, Valerie Bertinelli, Peter Graves, Doris Roberts, Bobby Di Cicco, Ray Girardin, Barry Sattels, Mykelti Williamson, Alex Rebar and Jon Gries.

The film is about two police partners with contrasting personalities who both work for the Los Angeles Police Department. It is often placed within the buddy cop sub-genre.

== Plot ==
Nick Barzack ("Berserk"), an irrational, unkempt and unpredictable cop, and Frank Hazeltine, his cultured, polite, and suave partner, follow a circuitous and highly circumstantial trail of clues, evidence, witnesses, and accomplices through Los Angeles. Barzack pauses only briefly for his mother, but repeatedly for his ex-wife. Hazeltine is almost too busy with every attractive woman he sees to pay attention to the thugs trying to kill him and his partner. But despite these distractions, Nick's dogged determination to get the man behind the dope scene eventually pays off.

The ladies' man Hazeltine and the borderline psychotic Berzack are narcotics detectives with a long history of wild behavior and effective work. Following Nick's hunch, they attempt to trace a new drug "black tar" to its source, beginning at a church fair which ends with Nick in drag and his suspect in an armed standoff. To calm the community, Nick and Frank are sent out of town to pick up a snitch, Boudreau, who is killed en route before naming his boss.

Nick tries to relieve his own stress by beating up a street pusher, then ends up in his ex-wife's arms, but she wants nothing to do with him. His mother's nagging only serves to remind him of why he is so driven. Frank relaxes with Zen and random women, but is inevitably interrupted by Nick's sick sense of humor and drive to get his man.

Following a lead from a fence, they use an addict to locate the hit-man who killed Boudreau (and then the addict), but another hitter puts an end to their investigation. While on forced vacation, they interrogate the pusher Nick encountered earlier, who puts them onto a big deal going down soon. When their surveillance is interrupted and the kingpins nearly escape, followed by attempts on both of their lives and Nick's ex, they realize they are fighting a mole in their own department. Nick cracks, and threatens his suspected drug lord without evidence, and Captain Ferris threatens to suspended him. But with help from Nick's mom and the fence, they set a plan in motion to expose the mole and the real ringleader.

== Cast ==
- Billy Dee Williams as Detective Frank Hazeltine
- Robert Carradine as Officer Nick Barzack
- Valerie Bertinelli as Teresa
- Doris Roberts as Mrs. Barzack
- Bobby Di Cicco as Malcolm
- Peter Graves as Capt. Ferris
- Barry Sattels as DaCosta
- Mykel T. Williamson as Casey
- Alex Rebar as Boudreau
- Ray Girardin as Lt. Kaminski
- Jon Gries as Bobby Sweet
- Larry Poindecter as Preppy Guy
- Bill Gazzarri as Himself

== Production and Release ==
Director Jack Smight said he wanted to cast Denzel Washington as Hazeltine but Cannon executive Menahem Golan was not interested and sought someone with more star power. The Barzack character was originally assigned to co-writer Jim Belushi but he left the film in its pre-production stage late in 1985 citing creative differences. Robert Carradine was signed in February 1986 to replace Belushi and Billy Dee Williams as his partner.

Smight was critical of the film's theatrical distribution saying it "never saw the light of day." The film opened on 228 screens on February 27, 1987 failing quickly at the box office and making less than $500,000 worldwide. The movie was released on home video in formats including VHS, LaserDisc, and, in some territories, Betamax in 1987. The film was issued on DVD by Metro-Goldwyn-Mayer Home Video's Limited Edition Collection series in 2012. Kino Lorber released a Blu-ray version of the film in 2023.

Shooting of the film took place in Los Angeles in March 1986 shortly after Carradine signed on and ended in late October of that year. Carradine was able to keep his musical commitments with his group, The Waybacks, while shooting the film. He is credited for singing Dear Mr. Fantasy and Gimme Some Lovin' in the film. Valerie Bertinelli was appearing in her first theatrical film since leaving the television series, One Day at a Time. The car explosion scene injuring her character used stuntwoman Cha Cha Sandoval-McMahon credited as Tanya Sandoval. The black semi used in this film was also used in the TV series, Knight Rider, during its third and fourth seasons.
