= To All a Goodnight =

1980 horror film by David Hess

- Theatrical release poster
- Directed by: David Hess
- Written by: Alex Rebar
- Produced by: Sandy Cobe; Jay Rasumny
- Starring: Jennifer Runyon; Forrest Swanson; Linda Gentile; William Lauer
- Cinematography: Bil Godsey
- Edited by: William J. Waters
- Music by: Richard Tufo
- Production company: Four Features Partners
- Distributed by: Intercontinental Releasing Corporation
- Release date: January 30, 1980
- Running time: 87 minutes
- Country: United States
- Language: English
- Budget: $70,000–75,000

To All a Goodnight is a 1980 American slasher film directed by David Hess in his directorial debut, and starring Jennifer Runyon and Forrest Swanson. Its plot follows a group of female finishing school students and their boyfriends being murdered during a Christmas party by a psychopath dressed as Santa Claus.

Filmed in late 1979 in Santa Barbara, California, To All a Goodnight was given a limited theatrical release in the United States by Intercontinental Releasing Corporation in January 1980. It is the second feature film in history to portray a murderous Santa Claus character as a villain, after the ...And All Through the House segment in the anthology film Tales from the Crypt (1972).

== Plot ==
During Christmas vacation at the rural Calvin Finishing School For Girls, a student is killed when she is accidentally pushed over a balcony during a prank. Two years later, on the Friday before Christmas, the school is emptying out for the holiday; however, five students — Nancy, Melody, Leia, Trisha, and Sam — decide for various reasons to remain at the school, planning to have a weekend get-together with their respective boyfriends. That night, while the remaining girls have dinner, their classmate Cynthia and her boyfriend are murdered outside the school by an assailant with a hunting knife.

The others meanwhile coerce the innocent Nancy into giving their housemother, Mrs. Jensen, milk laced with sedatives to make her fall asleep. After she falls asleep, the girls go to a nearby airstrip to meet their boyfriends, T. J., Alex, Tom, and Blake, who have flown in on a private plane. At the house, the group sit in the living room and talk. Trisha goes to the kitchen to retrieve beer, but is confronted by someone in a Santa Claus suit and mask, who slits her throat. When Trisha does not return, Tom goes to find her. He is confronted by the killer, who chases him outside and smashes his head with a rock. The killer buries each body in the school's garden.

Later, Sam and Blake have sex in the parlor. They are interrupted by the killer, disguised in a decorative suit of armor, who shoots Blake with a crossbow and decapitates Sam with an axe. Meanwhile, Nancy runs into the school's groundskeeper, Ralph, who ominously tells her he believes something evil is about to happen. Melody, meanwhile, seduces Alex in her bedroom and gives him a handjob.

The next morning, Nancy finds Ralph's corpse in the woods outside. A detective, Polansky, investigates the murder, and suggests the students remain sequestered inside for the remainder of the weekend. He also surmises that those missing may be victims of the killer, or possibly perpetrators in Ralph's death. That night, Jim, a police officer stationed outside the school, is murdered by the killer with an axe. Inside, Leia seduces another officer named Dan before going to take a shower. In the bathroom, she finds Sam's severed head hanging from the shower head. Dan rushes into the bathroom, but is stabbed to death from behind as he enters the doorway. Nancy and Alex subsequently come upon the scene, and find Leia suffering a psychotic break, traumatized by what she has witnessed; unable to speak, she begins dancing and humming to herself.

Melody and T. J. meanwhile are outside, unaware of what has happened. They kiss under a tree, but the killer, hiding above, strangles T. J. to death with a garrote made of wire. Melody flees inside to find Nancy, Alex, and Leia; the four are confronted by the killer in the Santa outfit, who reveals themselves to be Mrs. Jensen, avenging the death of her daughter who was killed in the prank two years prior. While Mrs. Jensen stalks Nancy through the house, Melody flees back to the airstrip and begs the pilot, sleeping beneath the plane, to take her to safety; the two are killed, however, when an unknown person in the Santa costume starts the engine, slicing them to pieces with the propeller.

Back at the school, Nancy is chased by Mrs. Jensen to the balcony. In a struggle, Mrs. Jensen is thrown over to her death. A horrified Nancy goes downstairs, where she is confronted by a second assailant in a Santa costume; it is revealed as Polansky, who explains that he is Mrs. Jensen's husband. Polansky attempts to strangle Nancy, but is killed with a crossbow by Alex. Together, Alex and Nancy flee the school, leaving Leia behind, dancing maniacally on the balcony, singing to herself.

== Cast ==
- Jennifer Runyon as Nancy
- Forrest Swanson as Alex
- Linda Gentile as Melody
- William Lauer as T. J.
- Judith Bridges as Leia
- Kiva Lawrence as Ruth Jensen (Note: Credited as Katherine Herrington.)
- Buck West as Ralph Cramer
- Sam Shamshak as Polansky
- Angela Bath as Trisha
- Denise Stearns as Sam
- Solomon Trager as Tom
- Jeff Butts as Blake
- Harry Reems as Pilot (Note: Credited as Dan Stryker.)

== Production ==
To All a Goodnight was shot over the course of ten days in November 1979 at a private estate in Santa Barbara, California, on a budget of approximately $70,000–$75,000. The film marked Hess's sole directorial effort. Recalling the filming experience, Hess said: "It was such a blur because we were living in the same house that we were shooting in. It was this big mansion owned by a druglord who kept it as a hideaway in Santa Barbara! We ate, slept, and worked continuously for 10 days straight."

== Release ==
The film was given a limited theatrical release in the United States on January 30, 1980 by Intercontinental Releasing Corporation (IRC).

=== Home media ===
To All a Goodnight was released on VHS in the United States by Media Home Entertainment on November 2, 1983. Due to the film's poor lighting, many scenes have been hard to see in VHS quality. Scorpion Releasing, under license from rights holder Metro-Goldwyn-Mayer, released the film for the first time on DVD and Blu-ray on October 21, 2014. Special features include interviews with actors Jennifer Runyon and Katherine Herrington and co-producer and writer Alex Rebar and the original theatrical trailer.

== Reception ==
=== Critical response ===
To All a Goodnight was largely poorly received by critics. In his book Going to Pieces: The Rise and Fall of the Slasher Film, 1978–1986, film scholar Adam Rockoff notes the film as "borrowing" elements from Bob Clark's Black Christmas (1974), including the "muted lighting" and sets adorned in Christmas decorations, and deemed the film's twist ending ineffective. AllMovie's Eleanor Mannikka similarly called it an "undistinguished, clichéd slasher film." Reviewing the film in 1984, writer Donald Willis described it as a "perfunctory, nondescript teenagers'-last-holiday movie," deeming the screenplay "worthless" and the performances "passable." Stephen Thrower wrote of the film: "If you're a lover of formulaic hack-and-slash movies, you'll probably get a mild kick out of this, just once, but return visits are unlikely."

Writing for JoBlo.com in a retrospective, Jake Dee praised the film for its atmosphere, writing: "Beyond the top-notch deaths and corresponding onscreen carnage, the movie excels in its festive decorations that really elicit the feeling of Christmastime. Not just Christmas tree lights, but lights strewn throughout the interiors and exteriors, regaled wreaths, ornaments, glowing neon in the background." Derek Anderson of Daily Dead wrote of the film favorably, noting that "the story for To All a Goodnight doesn’t reinvent the slasher wheel, but it sure does get some mileage out of it."

HorrorTalk.com gave the film a negative review, writing: "To All a Good Night is neither a scary movie nor is it truly satisfying either. It is an elusive title that comes with a reputation for establishing the rules of the sub-genre. It is true that Hess and company have lucked into leading the pack of slashers that followed for the next couple of decades. Unfortunately many of these successors handled the material more competently and have left this film behind for many a clear reason". The Hysteria Lives! awarded the film 2/5 stars, deeming it "the kind of slasher movie the Surrealists would have made if they had been around in the early 80's; confounding, nonsensical, by turns grindingly dull and startlingly wiggy." Ian Jane from DVD Talk called the film "a moderately entertaining low budget horror picture with some fun performances (and some bad ones!) and a decent twist".

== Sources ==
- DuPée, Matthew C. (2022). A Scary Little Christmas: A History of Yuletide Horror Films, 1972-2020. Jefferson, North Carolina: McFarland. ISBN 978-1-476-64540-7.
- Rockoff, Adam (2016). Going to Pieces: The Rise and Fall of the Slasher Film, 1978–1986. Jefferson, North Carolina: McFarland. ISBN 978-0-786-49192-6.
- Thrower, Stephen (2007). Nightmare USA: The Untold Story of the Exploitation Independents. Godalming, England: FAB Press. ISBN 978-1-903-25446-2.
- Willis, Donald C. (1984). Horror and Science Fiction Films III. Vol. 3. Lanham, Maryland: Scarecrow Press. ISBN 978-0-810-81723-4.
