= The Incredible Melting Man =

1977 film by William Sachs

- Theatrical release poster
- Directed by: William Sachs
- Written by: William Sachs
- Produced by: Samuel W. Gelfman
- Starring: Alex Rebar; Burr DeBenning; Myron Healey
- Cinematography: Willy Kurant
- Edited by: James Beshears
- Music by: Arlon Ober
- Production company: Quartet Productions
- Distributed by: American International Pictures
- Release date: December 9, 1977 (US)
- Running time: 84 minutes
- Country: United States
- Language: English

The Incredible Melting Man is a 1977 American science fiction body horror film directed and written by William Sachs. The plot concerns an astronaut whose body begins to melt after he is exposed to radiation during a space flight to Saturn, driving him to commit murders and consume human flesh to survive. During post-production, the producers reshot scenes without Sachs' participation. The film starred Alex Rebar as the main character, alongside Burr DeBenning as a scientist trying to help him and Myron Healey as a United States Air Force general seeking to capture him. While writing and shooting, Sachs was influenced by Night of the Living Dead. With the changes by the producers, the final film has been described as a remake of First Man into Space (1959), which in turn was directly influenced by The Quatermass Xperiment, even though Sachs had never seen either of those films.

The screenplay which Sachs dramatized was originally intended as a parody of horror films, but comedic scenes were edited out during production and new horror scenes added. Sachs claimed that the producers decided during shooting that a straight horror film would be more financially successful, and that the film suffered as a result. The Incredible Melting Man was produced by American International Pictures, which also handled the theatrical distribution, while Columbia Pictures handled international rights under the Columbia-EMI-Warner Distributors label. The film includes several homages to science fiction and horror films of the 1950s. Makeup artist Rick Baker provided the gory makeup effects for the film. He originally created four distinct stages of makeup design so that the main character's body would appear to melt gradually, but the stages were ultimately cut from the final film.

The film was commercially successful, but it received largely negative reviews, although even critical reviews complimented Baker's makeup effects. According to writer/director Sachs, many scenes that were re-shot and changed by the producers proved problematic due to their inferior acting. It has been developed a cult following.

== Plot ==
During a space flight to Saturn, three astronauts are exposed to a blast of radiation which kills two of them and seriously injures the third, Colonel Steve West. Back in a hospital on Earth, West awakens and is horrified to find the flesh on his face and hands melting away. Hysterical, he attacks and kills a nurse (Bonnie Inch), then escapes the hospital in a panic. Dr. Loring and Dr. Theodore "Ted" Nelson, a scientist and friend of West, discover that the nurse's corpse is emitting feeble radiation, and realize West's body has become radioactive. Nelson believes West has gone insane, and concludes he must consume human flesh in order to slow the melting. Nelson calls General Michael Perry, a United States Air Force officer familiar with West's accident, and the general agrees to help Nelson find him.

West attacks and kills a fisherman in a wood, then encounters there and frightens a little girl, Carol, but she escapes unharmed. Nelson and Perry arrive at the crime scene where the fisherman's body was found. Sheriff Neil Blake suspects that Nelson knows something, but Nelson tells the sheriff nothing because Perry had earlier informed him that any information about West was classified. Later that night, Nelson returns home to his pregnant wife Judy, who tells him that her elderly mother Helen and Helen's boyfriend Harold are coming over for dinner. On their way, however, Helen and Harold are killed by West.

When Blake finds the bodies, he calls Nelson, who comes out to identify them. After Blake angrily demands an explanation, Nelson reluctantly reveals West's condition. Nelson believes West is somehow getting stronger the more his body decomposes. Back at Nelson's house, West attacks and kills Perry, although Judy is not harmed. Nelson and Blake arrive just as West escapes. West then stumbles upon the home of a married couple. West kills the man and attacks his wife, but she drives him away after chopping his arm off with a cleaver. Blake receives a call about the attack and takes Nelson with him to investigate.

They track West to a giant power plant. Blake tries to shoot West with a shotgun, but West throws the sheriff into power lines, killing him. West knocks Nelson over a railing, leaving the doctor hanging on the side. Nelson appeals to West, reminding him that they were friends, and West decides to pull Nelson to safety. Two armed security guards then arrive and, in a panic, fatally shoot Nelson in the face as he tries to protect West. Enraged, West kills the security guards and stumbles away. After collapsing against the side of a building and with no hope of survival left for him, West slowly, and completely, melts away. The next morning, a janitor finds his gory remains and casually mops them into a garbage can. Enthusiastic radio reports announce the next crewed mission to Saturn.

== Cast ==
- Alex Rebar as Colonel Steve West
- Burr DeBenning as Dr. Theodore "Ted" Nelson
- Myron Healey as General Michael Perry
- Michael Alldredge as Sheriff Neil Blake
- Ann Sweeny as Judy Nelson
- Lisle Wilson as Dr. Loring
- Julie Drazen as Carol
- Edwin Max as Harold
- Dorothy Love as Helen Nelson
- Jonathan Demme as Matt Winters
- Janus Blythe as Nell Winters
- Leigh Mitchell as Carol's Mother
- Cheryl Smith as Sandra
- Mickey Lolich as Security Guard

== Production ==
=== Writing ===
The Incredible Melting Man was written and directed by filmmaker William Sachs. The idea for the film came to him when his mother, working in the office of a spray paint company, showed him "gooey stuff" which was used as a basis for spray paint and jokingly suggested that he should do a film featuring that material. During writing, Sachs was influenced by The Night of the Living Dead and wanted to give the film a 1950s horror film feeling. But the final film, with its structure changed by the producers in post-production, has been described by some sources – including the film magazine Cinefantastique and the 1995 book Cult Science Fiction Films – as a remake of First Man into Space (1959), another film about an astronaut who becomes a monster after an accident in space. Science fiction film historian Gene Wright suggested that the final film was heavily influenced by The Quatermass Xperiment (1955), a British horror film about an astronaut who begins mutating into an alien organism after a spaceflight. Sachs, however, had never seen either of those films, and his original screenplay had a very different structure. He had originally written the script for The Incredible Melting Man as a parody of horror films. According to Michael Adams, a film reviewer who interviewed Sachs, this was the reason that the film mixed horror with comedic moments, such as when Steve West's detached ear gets stuck on a tree, and when a janitor sweeps West's melted body into a garbage can at the end of the film. Adams claims that this explains several comedic lines of dialogue otherwise inconsistent with the rest of the film, including one moment when homeless men notice the melting West and say to each other, "You think we've got trouble, look at that dude". In Sachs' original version, the film opened with the wide-angle shot of the nurse running through the hallway; this would not have been in slow motion, unlike the final film, where the producers played it back slowed down. Only later would viewers have gradually learned the background of the melting man. All the scenes showing the astronauts in space and the lead character in the hospital were re-shot during post-production without influence by the director, and Sachs criticized both the acting in those scenes and how they restructure the film. There are logical problems in the final film due to the re-shot scenes; it is never fully explained how West's spacecraft returned to Earth from Saturn when West himself was so seriously injured and the other two members of his crew were both killed.

Welch D. Everman, author of Cult Science Fiction Films, pointed to several homages in the movie to science fiction and horror films of the 1950s. The title itself is a reference to the Jack Arnold film The Incredible Shrinking Man (1957), and the final scene when a radio report advertises another trip to Saturn, thus hinting that another accident could occur, was a common device in 1950s horror films. One difference, noted by Everman, is that in the 1950s films, government cover-ups and secret agendas were often ascribed to the good of the general public, whereas The Incredible Melting Man, like many late 1970s films of its genre, suggested otherwise. Variety described the script, in addition to its horror elements, as "a human story attempting to leave a moral message as to whether society or the horrible creature it is chasing is really the most destructive".

=== Casting ===
Alex Rebar, in one of only a handful of film appearances throughout his acting career, starred as Steve West. Burr DeBenning played Dr. Ted Nelson, and General Michael Perry was portrayed by Myron Healey, who was, Everman notes, often cast as a villain in 1950s science fiction films. Film director Jonathan Demme played the small role of Matt Winters, one of West's victims. Rainbeaux Smith, best known for her appearances in B movies and exploitation films, appeared in The Incredible Melting Man as a model who finds one of West's victims while trying to avoid a photographer seeking to take explicit photos of her.

=== Filming ===
Producer Max Rosenberg, best known for his horror and supernatural films, provided the financing for The Incredible Melting Man. Samuel W. Gelfman was the film's producer, and American International Pictures served as both the production company and the distributor. According to Sachs, Gelfman and Rosenberg decided during shooting that a straight horror film would be more financially successful than a parody, so many of the comedic scenes were edited out and new horror scenes were shot and added to the film. Sachs said he felt the film was taken away from him, and that it suffered as a result because the producers tried to make it both a comedy and horror film, thus failing at both. Sachs said of the decision, "How can a serious horror movie end with the monster being shoveled into a garbage can?"

Makeup effects artist Rick Baker designed facial appliances that simulated the deterioration of the main character.

Makeup artist Baker provided the special makeup effects for The Incredible Melting Man, which included the gradual melting of Steve West. Rebar wore facial appliances that simulated melting flesh, and his hands and feet were fitted with liquid substances that dropped off as he walked, creating the appearance that West's body was falling apart. During one scene, a murdered fisherman's severed head falls down a waterfall and smashes on the rocks below. To create the effect, Baker used a gelatin head with a wax skull and fake blood inside, which burst out upon impact.

Baker created four distinct stages of makeup design so that West would appear to melt gradually as time passed. However, after the film went through two separate stages of editing, these makeup stages were ultimately eliminated from the final cut, and the character looks generally the same throughout the film. Richard Meyers, author of The World of Fantasy Films, said actor Rebar was impatient and uncooperative with the extensive makeup sessions required for the effects, and thus did not wear all of the facial appliances Baker designed. This, Meyers said, might have been an additional factor in the lack of makeup effect stages in the final film. The version of the film shot by Sachs had not included any scenes with West before he sustained the radiation poisoning that caused his body to melt. Such scenes were, however, re-shot later by the producers without Sachs' participation.

Harry Woolman worked on the special effects along with Baker, and Willy Curtis worked as the film's cinematographer. Some scenes included photography errors, including one in which light shines through a kitchen window from outside even though it is supposed to be nighttime. Michel Levesque provided art direction, and the musical score was composed by London Philharmonic Orchestra conductor Arlon Ober.

During post-production, as the producers decided to change the film into a more serious horror film, they filmed numerous scenes for that purpose without the participation of the director. Among those scenes is the entire prologue of the astronauts in space and West waking up in a hospital—these are the only scenes in which Rebar's face is seen without makeup. Additionally, the film was extensively re-edited by the producers. Sachs criticized the acting in those re-shot scenes, as well as the change of tone they bring into the film along with the re-editing by the producers.

== Release ==
=== Distribution ===
The distribution of The Incredible Melting Man was handled by American International Pictures, with the involvement of film producer and distributor Irwin Yablans, who specialized primarily in B movies and low-budget horror films. A trailer released for the film attempted to build tension by not revealing the monster right away. Instead, it showed portions of the scene immediately before the nurse is murdered, in which she runs down a hallway screaming and then crashes through a glass window trying to escape from West, who is only shown towards the end of the trailer. In some advertisements, the monster from the film was described as "the first NEW horror creature". As a promotional gimmick, candles were made and sold to advertise the film.

One poster for the film included the statement: "Rick Baker, the new master of special effects, who brought you the magic of The Exorcist and gave you the wonder of King Kong, now brings you his greatest creation, The Incredible Melting Man". Although Baker assisted with the effects in The Exorcist (1973), Dick Smith was the makeup artist who primarily worked on that film, not Baker. Exorcist director William Friedkin was so angry about the poster that, upon seeing it on an associate's wall, he tore it down and ripped it to pieces. Baker, who did not know about the poster in advance, was horrified by the publicity campaign and publicly apologized for it, claiming: "Dick wanted some help so I first went out to do some work on the dummy whose head turns around 360 degrees. I really didn't do anything creative, I just did labor".

=== Home media ===
The Incredible Melting Man was released on VHS in 1986 by Vestron Video, and was rereleased in 1994 by Orion Pictures Library, although unlike other Orion VHS releases, it was not digitally remastered. In September 2000, The Incredible Melting Man was once again released on VHS as part of "Midnite Movies", a line of B movies and exploitation films released to home video by Metro-Goldwyn-Mayer. Although currently unavailable on DVD in Region 1, it was released in Region 2 by CMV Laservision on February 2, 2003. In addition to the home video and DVD releases, The Incredible Melting Man has been featured in several film festivals, including the 1987 Visions Film Festival at the Enmore Theatre in Sydney, Australia; the 2007 B-Fest in Chicago; the 2008 Horrorama Movie Festival in Englewood, Colorado; and the 2010 Groovy B-Movie Marathon in Durham, North Carolina. Scream Factory released the film on Blu-ray in 2013.

== Reception ==
=== Critical response ===
The Incredible Melting Man is a singular theatrical experience that truly lives up to its crazed, pulpy title. Originally intended as an homage to the great "atomic age" horrors of the Fifties, William Sachs' clever satire was recut by its original distributor to cash in on the horror craze.

— Chud.com, about The Incredible Melting Man

The Incredible Melting Man received largely negative reviews. It holds a 7% rotten rating on review aggregator Rotten Tomatoes from 14 reviews. It has ranked among the Bottom 100 list of films on the Internet Movie Database, although there have also been very favorable reviews. The New York Post attested to Sachs' "simple mastery of the medium". Tom Buckley of The New York Times described it as poorly written and directed, calling it one of many poor summer films released "to fill the need of drive-in operators for something cheap to put on the screen for the kids in the cars to ignore or laugh at". The Globe and Mail writer Robert Martin praised Baker's makeup effects and said director Sachs did an efficient job building tension. However, Martin strongly criticized the script and the acting, claiming "logic and character are jettisoned in favor of suspense and horror," and said the film's positive elements were not strong enough to outweigh the negatives. John Foyston of The Oregonian strongly condemned the film as gratuitously gory with thin, motiveless characters. He declared it worse than the horror film Manos: The Hands of Fate (1966), which is widely considered one of the worst films ever made. Rick Worland, a film professor at the Meadows School of the Arts who wrote a book about horror films, said there was "little to recommend" about The Incredible Melting Man besides Baker's makeup effects. Richard Meyers, a novelist who also wrote about science-fiction films, called the film muddled and dull: "Although the movie didn't have to be a sage examination of outer space diseases, it should at least have been exciting". Meyers complimented Baker's visual effects, but said his work was undermined by poor filming and actor Rebar's impatience with the makeup effects.

A 1985 review in the book The Motion Picture Guide said, "The film tries to balance horror against morality but ends up shaky at best". The review described the special effects as "all right, but not nearly as gruesome as the film pretends they are". In a review written shortly after the film was released, Variety wrote that the film "more often than not succeeds in telling a story and sustaining audience interest," and that the script included not only horrors, but also a human story with a moral message about society. However, the review also called the dialogue "trite," described some scenes as "technically incorrect," and said the film disappointed by lingering on the ordinary characters rather than on the monster. Gene Wright, who wrote a book about science fiction films, said the film "attempts to blend pathos with awesome horror, but can't resist going for the gut with a surfeit of gore". Blockbuster Inc.'s Guide to Movies and Videos gave the film 2.5 stars out of 4, and described it as "unexciting and contrived, though Rick Baker's gross-out makeup is undeniably effective". In The Encyclopedia of Science Fiction Movies, Phil Hardy described it as a better-than-average but "spotty" film, and said director William Sachs injected a sense of "grisly humor" into it. However, Hardy said the central concept inspired more laughter than terror, and called the special effects "only routine".

Some reviews were more positive. Welch D. Everman, author of Cult Science Fiction Films, compared the relationship between West and Nelson to that of Victor Frankenstein and his monster in Mary Shelley's novel Frankenstein. Everman wrote, "This is the kind of movie we've come to expect from AIP — cheaply made, nasty, and lots of fun". John W. Bowen of the Belleville Intelligencer said he enjoyed the "camp" style of the film, adding, "It's both inexplicable and sad this brain-damaged yet fiercely determined little drive-in bottom feeder never garnered more than a tiny cult following over the years". A 1978 critique in The Review of the News said, "Films like The Incredible Melting Man are not made to be good; they are made to be scary. For anyone looking to raise goosebumps on their flesh, this one is sufficient to give you your money's worth". Matt Maiellaro, co-creator of the Cartoon Network series Aqua Teen Hunger Force, said the film inspired him to start making films himself, adding, "When I was eight, I watched The Incredible Melting Man and knew that horror movies were going to be big religion in my life". Z movie director Tim Ritter said he was partially inspired to enter show business by watching a trailer for The Incredible Melting Man at age 9. Ritter said, "I was too young to see the movie, but the trailer really got into my imagination".

== Legacy ==
The film appeared in It Came from Hollywood, a 1982 comedy film featuring a compilation of clips from more than 100 B movies from the 1930s to the 1970s, which are shown between scripted segments performed by comedians.

Baker's effects from The Incredible Melting Man inspired the makeup effects for a scene in the science fiction-action film RoboCop (1987). During the scene, Emil Antonowsky (Paul McCrane) attempts to ram RoboCop with his van, but instead accidentally drives into a vat of toxic waste, causing the flesh to melt off his face and hands. These effects were conceived and designed by special makeup effects artist Rob Bottin, who was inspired by Baker's work on The Incredible Melting Man and dubbed the RoboCop effects "the Melting Man" as a homage to the production.

A poster for the film appeared in the 1990 comedy Home Alone on the bedroom wall of character Keven McCallister's brother Buzz.

The Incredible Melting Man was featured and lampooned in an episode of Mystery Science Theater 3000. The film appeared in the fourth episode of the show's seventh season, which was broadcast on Comedy Central on February 24, 1996. Michael J. Nelson, the show's head writer, spoke disparagingly about the film while describing it to the press: "The plot is – and I'm not kidding here – the plot is, a guy is melting. That's the plot".

The film was featured on episode 108 of RedLetterMedia's 'Best of The Worst' strand.

== See also ==
- "I Am the Doorway", a short story by Stephen King with a similar concept
