= A Man Called Sarge =

1990 film by Stuart Gillard

- Promotional poster
- Directed by: Stuart Gillard
- Written by: Stuart Gillard
- Produced by: Gene Corman
- Starring: Gary Kroeger; Gretchen German; Jennifer Runyon; Marc Singer; Bobby Di Cicco; Andy Bumatai
- Narrated by: Don LaFontaine
- Cinematography: David Gurfinkel
- Edited by: Richard Candib
- Music by: Chuck Cirino
- Distributed by: The Cannon Group
- Release date: February 2, 1990 (United States)
- Running time: 88 minutes
- Country: United States
- Language: English
- Box office: $92,706 (domestic)

A Man Called Sarge is a 1990 American parody film, written and directed by Stuart Gillard, starring Gary Kroeger, Marc Singer, Gretchen German and introducing a young Natasha Lyonne.

The humour is built on slapstick and verbal puns, in the fashion of comedy filmmaking trio Zucker, Abrahams and Zucker, spoofing a variety of classic war films – notably Casablanca – and the stereotypes of the genre. Sarge (Gary Kroeger), the anti-hero protagonist, is a patriot with an over-the-top John Wayne persona. The antagonist, General Von Kraut (Marc Singer), is a derogatory portrayal of a German commander – extremely evil, perverted and a poor decision maker – emphasized by his name, as kraut is often used as a pejorative term for German soldiers. Furthermore, Sarge's group of misfit soldiers include a Native American, a New York Jew, a hillbilly and a French officer in the style of Maurice Chevalier.

A memorable moment in the film is when Miss Sadie (Gretchen German), a naïve mission school teacher, sings a song called "Jesus Was a Black Dude", with a full gospel choir, to the Arab children in her class.

The film was shot on location in Israel, even though it was set in North Africa.

== Plot ==
Set during the World War II North African Western Desert Campaign, the story follows a misadventurous squad of French Foreign Legion deserters, led by their charismatic Sarge. They set out across the Sahara desert to strike a blow on the German-occupied city of Tobruk.

== Cast ==
- Gary Kroeger as Sarge Duke Roscoe
- Marc Singer as Generalmajor Klaus von Kraut
- Gretchen German as Miss Sadie Rayburn
- Jennifer Runyon as Fifi LaRue
- Andy Greenhalgh as Major Lesley Browning
- Michael Mears as Colonel Henri Cheval
- Bobby Di Cicco as Pvt. Frank Anzalone
- Travis McKenna as Pvt. Billy Bob McAlpine
- Howard Busgang as Pvt. Irving Steinmetz
- Andrew Bumatai as Pvt. Willie Bearpaw
- Chris England as Fergus
- Jeffry Wickham as Reginald Fitzpatrick
- Peter Dennis as Montgomery
- Yehuda Efroni as Father Bruce
- Natasha Lyonne as Arab girl
- Bruce Jenner as himself
- Don LaFontaine as narrator

At the time of production, Gary Kroeger was mostly known for his work on the late-night comedy and variety TV show Saturday Night Live, where he was a regular from 1982 to 1985. Although Kroeger had starred in a few films prior to and after A Man Called Sarge, this is the only time he played the title role in a feature film. He had previously worked with director Stuart Gillard as the main character in Disney's 1987 television movie The Return of the Shaggy Dog.

Marc Singer was a well established TV actor when he enrolled as General Von Kraut, with a career spanning almost 20 years, including the lead role in the series V. As a feature actor, he was best known for the 1982 film The Beastmaster. A Man Called Sarge marked a return to the big screen and the start of a prolific film career during the 1990s. This was Singer's second collaboration with producer Gene Corman, the first being If You Could See What I Hear, released in 1982. They worked together again on Watchers II, released in the summer of 1990.

Gretchen German had an active television career since the mid-'80s, but A Man Called Sarge was her first feature film.

Natasha Lyonne, who was living in Israel at the time, achieved her first credited feature film role as a young Arab girl who gets punched in the face by General Von Kraut, while trying to defend Miss Sadie, her teacher. She is credited as Natasha Leon.

== Production notes ==
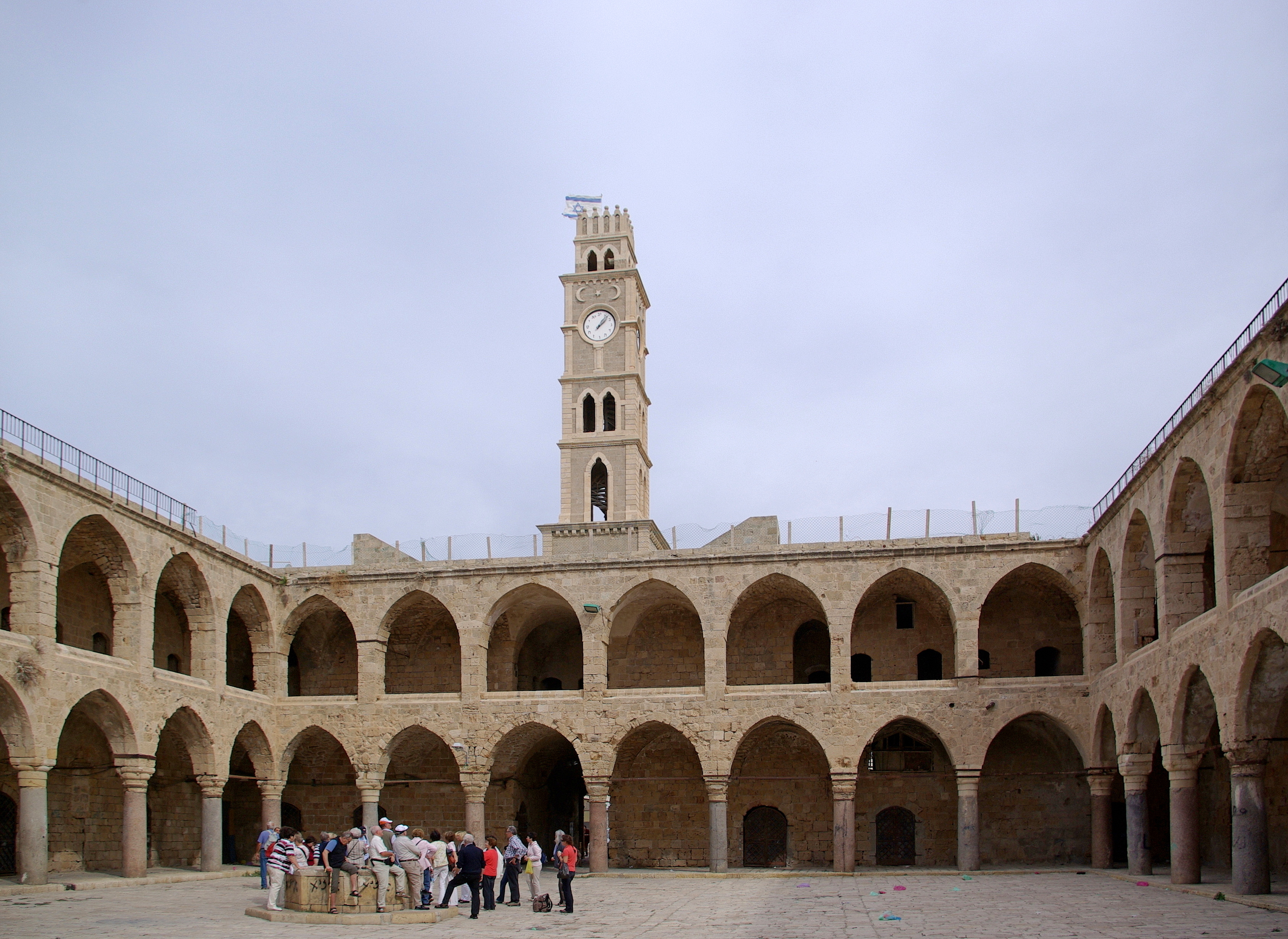
The Khan al-Umdan, in Acre, was used for a showdown scene between Allied and Axis forces

A Man Called Sarge was produced by Gene Corman, brother and production partner of Roger Corman, from a 1988 script by director Stuart Gillard. Serving as executive producers were Yoram Globus and Christopher Pearce, heads of Cannon Pictures at the time. This film is part of the early 1990s attempt by Globus, an Israeli veteran producer, to save and rebuild Cannon under new administration, after the departure of his cousin and longtime business partner Menahem Golan and the financial distress in the late 1980s. Eventually, The Cannon Group filed bankruptcy a few years later.

Gene Corman had previously produced Tobruk, a 1967 war action film, set during the failed British attempt to capture Tobruk, in September 1942.

Although the city of Tobruk is located in Libya, filming was done in Israel. One of the final scenes, the showdown between Sarge and Von Kraut, was shot in the Khan al-Umdan caravanserai, in the historical centre of Acre.

== Release ==
A Man Called Sarge had a short-running theatrical release on February 2, 1990, earning $92,706 at the domestic box office. It was released on VHS later the same year. The film was re-released in 2001 as an Amazon.com exclusive. The film received a PG-13 rating from the MPAA, ab 16 from FSK and 15 from the BBFC.

On some promotional material, the taglines used were:

- They have no fear. No shame. No chance. All would be lost except for... A Man Called Sarge
- First there was Airplane. Then there was Police Academy. Now it's time for... A Man Called Sarge
- Wo wir sind, ist die Front! — German for Where we are, is the front!

Like many other low-budget films, A Man Called Sarge has a complex history of copyright ownership and distribution rights. Cannon Releasing, part of The Cannon Group, handled the theatrical distribution rights. Worldwide video distribution was in charge of Cannon Video, in association with several partners, including MGM/UA Home Video and Warner Home Video. Currently, the film's rights are owned by MGM, after the acquisition of The Cannon Group catalogue, almost in its entirety, following bankruptcy in 1993.

Although British actor Andy Greenhalgh, who played the role of Major Browning, estimates this to be "a long-forgotten American feature film", it occasionally airs on TV channels around the world, mainly through the MGM Channel and its affiliates.

A home video edition was officially released on DVD in November 2011, as part of the Limited Edition Collection - MGM's On-Demand DVD-R line.

== See also ==
- Second Battle of El Alamein
- List of comedy films of the 1990s
