= Alex Rebar =

American producer, writer, actor (1940–2021)

Alexander John Rebar
- Born: Alexander John Rebar; July 9, 1940; Dallas, Pennsylvania, U.S.
- Died: November 19, 2021 (aged 81); Los Angeles, California, U.S.
- Other name: Alex Rebar
- Education: Valley Forge Military Academy; Wilkes College
- Years active: 1965–1992
- Spouse: Barbar Karp

Alexander John Rebar (July 9, 1940 – November 19, 2021) was an American producer, writer and actor. He was most known for starring in the cult film The Incredible Melting Man.

== Life and career ==
He was born in Dallas, Pennsylvania on a farm where he rode horses. He attended Valley Forge Military Academy and Wilkes College before enlisting in the Navy as a Photographers Mate. After serving in the Korean War he moved to Paris where he co-founded and acted with the Studio Theater of Paris and managed a jazz club.

In Rome, Rebar worked for Production Cinitalia Edizone doing voice dubbing for Marcello Mastroianni, Klaus Kinski and the Italian version of Mighty Mouse. One of his first appearances on-screen was the psychedelic film Microscopic Liquid Subway to Oblivion with Ewa Aulin as a professor who is abducted by drug-addled hippies. He went on to write Beyond the Door, a Rosemary's Baby-meets-Exorcist knock-off before returning to Hollywood and making his star turn as the infamous (and aqueous) The Incredible Melting Man. Rebar says he enjoyed the "bad guy" role as the monster because "When else do you get to ham it up like that?"

Through the 1980s Rebar went on to numerous television appearances in The Young and the Restless, Days of Our Lives, Murder, She Wrote, CHiPs and Amityville 4: The Evil Escapes while simultaneously writing and producing infamous cult films such Demented, Santa Claus slasher film To All a Goodnight, horror/rock documentary Terror on Tour, and Thanksgiving slasher film Home Sweet Home.

In the early 2000s he briefly came out of retirement to begin producing videos for the internet including a series called "Sex, Pain and Murder" for iFilm.

== Death ==
Rebar died at his home in Glendale, California, on November 19, 2021, at the age of 81. His final wishes were for no memorial but that "Everyone should just go home, crack open a bottle of wine, and listen to 'Got My Mojo Workin' by Muddy Waters."

== Filmography ==
=== As actor ===
- Microscopic Liquid Subway to Oblivion (1970)
- Tales of Canterbury (1973)
- The Young and the Restless (as Vince Holliday, 1973)
- The Incredible Melting Man (1977)
- The Incredible Hulk (1977)
- CHiPs (1981)
- Voyagers! (1982)
- Simon & Simon (1983)
- Berengers (1985)
- Murder, She Wrote (1984–1985)
- Number One with a Bullet (1987)
- Amityville 4: The Evil Escapes (1989)

=== As writer/producer ===
- Beyond the Door (1974) (as collaborating writer)
- To All a Goodnight (1980)
- Demented (1980)
- Terror on Tour (1980) (as writer and executive producer)
- Home Sweet Home (1981) (as executive producer)
- Nowhere to Hide (1987)
- Sex, Pain and Murder (2000, web series)
