= Jennifer Runyon =

American actress (1960–2026)

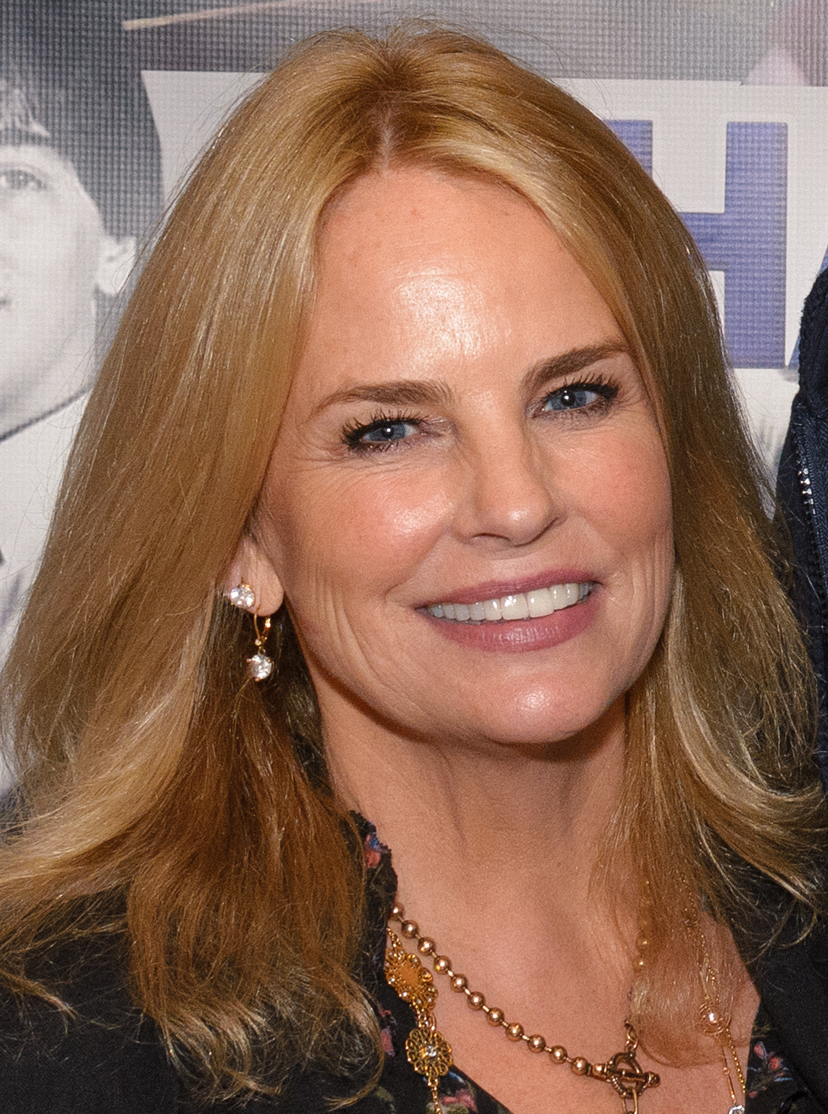
- Runyon in 2017
- Born: April 1, 1960; Chicago, Illinois, U.S.
- Died: March 6, 2026 (aged 65); New York City, U.S.
- Occupation: Actress
- Years active: 1980–2025
- Notable work: Ghostbusters; Charles in Charge; A Very Brady Christmas
- Spouse: Todd Corman (m. 1991)
- Children: 2
- Father: Jim Runyon

Jennifer Runyon (April 1, 1960 – March 6, 2026) was an American actress. She made her feature-film debut in the slasher film To All a Goodnight (1980), and had supporting roles in the comedies Up the Creek (1984) and Ghostbusters (1984). She played the role of Gwendolyn Pierce in the 1984 sitcom Charles in Charge on CBS during its first season. In 1988, she portrayed Cindy Brady in a CBS television film, A Very Brady Christmas.

== Early life ==
Runyon was born in Chicago, Illinois, on April 1, 1960, the daughter of radio announcer and disc jockey Jim Runyon, and actress Jane Roberts. She had a half-brother, Scott, from her father's first marriage. Runyon's parents both worked for the radio station WCFL in Chicago.

She grew up in various cities in the United States, as her father's disc jockey career required the family to move frequently. Runyon spent her childhood in Chicago, Cleveland, Ohio, and Boston, Massachusetts.

== Career ==
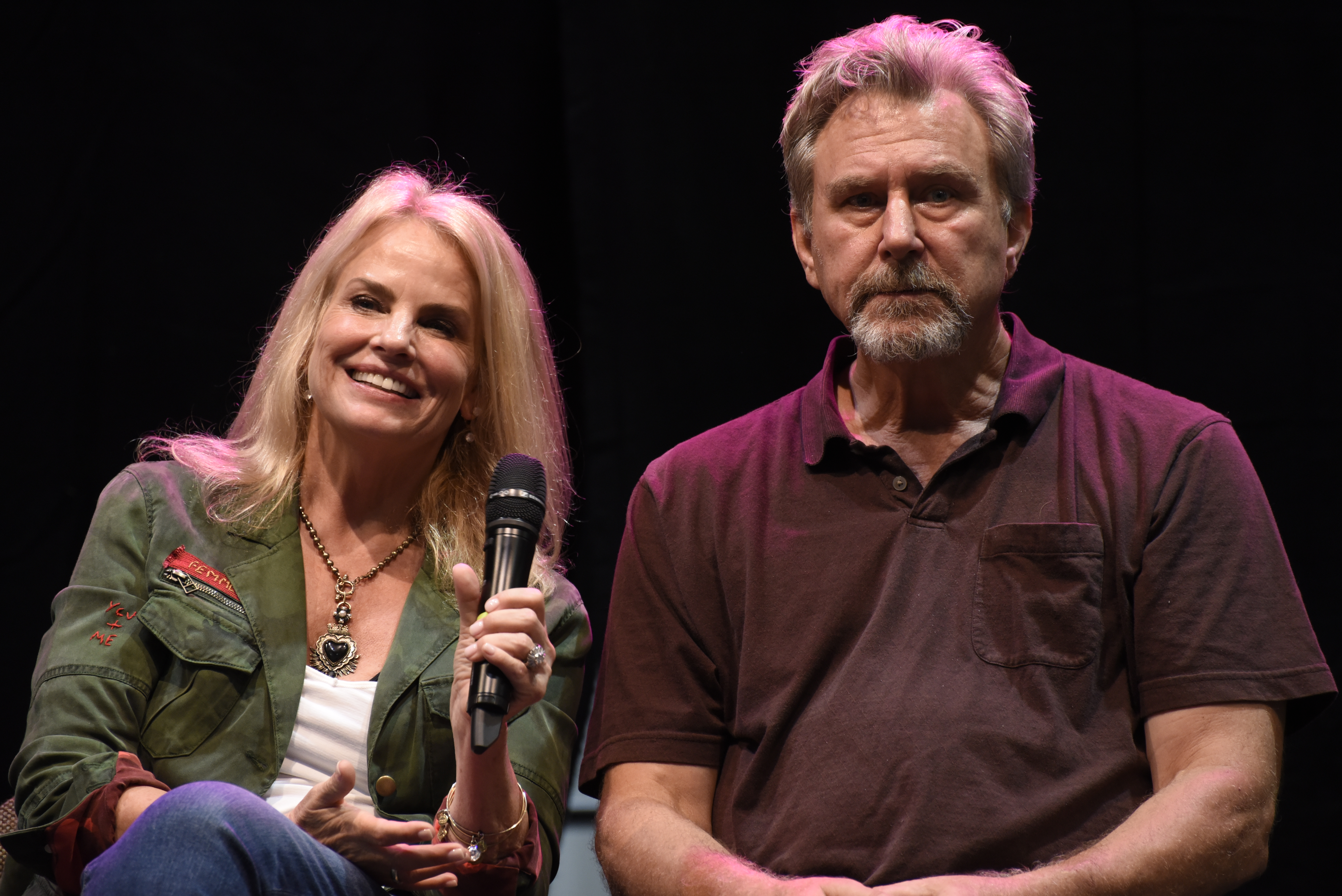
Runyon and Timothy Carhart at Offenburg Comic Con, 2018

Runyon made her feature-film debut in the slasher film To All a Goodnight (1980), about a group of school girls stalked by a killer in a Santa Claus costume. Then she was cast in a supporting role as Sally Frame on the soap opera Another World, which she taped in New York from March 1981 until February 1983. She had a small part as a student being given an ESP test by Peter Venkman in Ghostbusters (1984), and starred in Up the Creek also in 1984, the latter of which was filmed over several weeks in Bend, Oregon.

She later appeared on television as Gwendolyn Pierce in the sitcom Charles in Charge (1984–1985), and replaced Susan Olsen as Cindy Brady in the television film A Very Brady Christmas (1988).

In 1988, Runyon played the lead in The In Crowd and was in the pilot of Quantum Leap. She starred in the comedy 18 Again!. She appeared in Murder, She Wrote in an episode, "Seal of the Confessional" (1989) playing the character Kelly Barret alongside Angela Lansbury in the lead role. In 1990 she played a supporting role in the World War II parody A Man Called Sarge, produced by Gene Corman, her father-in-law. She also made a guest appearance on Beverly Hills, 90210 in 1991.

== Personal life ==
On March 9, 1991, Runyon married Todd Corman, a collegiate basketball coach with stints at Loyola Marymount in Los Angeles, Albertson College in Caldwell, Idaho, and Oregon State University in Corvallis, Oregon; he also worked in film and television production during breaks between sports seasons. The couple had a son, Wyatt, and a daughter, Bayley.

In a 2014 interview, Runyon announced that she was semiretired from acting, and instead working as a teacher. She said that she was co-hosting a cooking podcast.

== Death ==
Runyon died of cancer on March 6, 2026, aged 65. Her friend Erin Murphy said that Runyon had a "brief battle" with the disease.

== Filmography ==
=== Film ===
Year	Title	Role	Notes	Ref.
1980	To All a Goodnight	Nancy		
1984	Up the Creek	Heather Merriweather		
1984	Ghostbusters	Female Student		
1985	The Falcon and the Snowman	Carole		
1986	Flight of the Spruce Goose	Terry		
1986	Dreams of Gold: The Mel Fisher Story	Angel Fisher	Television film	
1986	Blue de Ville	J.C. Smith	Television film	
1986	Pros & Cons	Christy	Television film	
1988	The In Crowd	Vicky		
1988	18 Again!	Robin Morrison		
1988	A Very Brady Christmas	Cindy Brady	Television film	
1990	A Man Called Sarge	Fifi LaRue		
1991	Killing Streets	Sandra Ross		
1991	Tagteam	Rita Valentine	Television film	
1992	Till Death Us Do Part	Judy Davis	Television film	
1993	Carnosaur	Ann 'Thrush'		
2015	Silent Night, Bloody Night 2: Revival	Carol Brickman		
2016	Terror Tales	Melanie	Segment: "Epidemic"	
2017	Bloodsucka Jones vs. The Creeping Death	Nurse Zarkov		
2019	Cleanin' Up the Town: Remembering Ghostbusters	Herself	Documentary film	

=== Television ===
Year	Title	Role	Notes	Ref.
1981–1982	Another World	Sally Frame	Main cast	
1983	The Fall Guy		Episode: "Hollywood Shorties"	
1983	Boone	Connie Sue	Episode: "Second Fiddle"	
1983	Six Pack (TV Series)	Heather “Breezy” Akins	NBC TV Series Pilot / Movie	
1984	The Master	Alicia Clayton	Episode: "Hostages"	
1984–1985, 1987	Charles in Charge	Gwendolyn Pierce	Main cast (Season 1); guest appearance (Season 2)	
1985	Space	Marcia Grant	Miniseries	
1987	Magnum, P.I.	Christine Maxfield Bentley	Episode: "Murder by Night"	
1987	The Highwayman	Amanda Merrick	Episode: "The Highwayman"	
1987	Who's the Boss?	Doreen	Episode: "Hell on Wheels"	
1987	Dear John	Karen	Episode: "Hell on Wheels"	
1987	Valerie	Gwen	Episode: "Hell on Wheels"	
1989	Quantum Leap	Peggy Stratton	Episode: "Genesis: Part 1 and 2 - September 13, 1956"	
1989–1991	Murder, She Wrote	Rebecca Beiler / Kelly Barrett	2 episodes	
1990	Booker	Linda Fowler	Episode: "The Red Dot"	
1991	Beverly Hills, 90210	Christine	Episode: "Down and Out of District in Beverly Hills"	
1992	Vinnie & Bobby	Hillary Bomgarden	Episode: "Spring is in the Air"	
