= Demented (disambiguation) =

Demented may refer to dementia. Other uses include:

- Demented (1980 film), an American film
- Le Dernier des fous, a French film
- "Demented", a 1995 song by Chick from Someone's Ugly Daughter
