= Egyptian Knowledge Bank =

Virtual library

Egyptian Knowledge Bank logo

The Egyptian Knowledge Bank (EKB) (Arabic: بنك المعرفة المصري) is an online library archive and resource that provides access to learning resources and tools for educators, researchers, students, and the general public of Egypt.

== Establishment and aims ==
The initiative was announced on Science Day 2014 by the Egyptian President Abdel El-Fattah El-Sisi, was published online on Egyptian Youth Day January 9, 2016 during a celebration held at the Cairo Opera House, with a full access launch on January 23, 2016: The Egyptian Education and Scientific Research Council signed agreements with over 26 regional and international publishing houses to be included in the Egyptian Knowledge Bank,. Tarek Shawki, chairman of The Presidential Advisory Council for Education and Scientific Research and Dean of the School of Sciences and Engineering at the American University in Cairo said in an interview with Times Higher Education that the project “...is an unprecedented attempt to spread the culture of knowledge and learning, and put a spotlight on the value of research.”

At the Knowledge Summit 2018, talks were held about establishing the Arab Digital Union, a combination of the online resources of the Saudi Digital Library, Egypt's Knowledge Bank, and the Dubai Digital Library. Tarek Shawki, talking on the subject of the Arab Digital Union, has said that it will "...help consolidate the cultural exchange among the Arab nations, as well as help the growth of partnerships based on knowledge and culture.”

== Usage statistics ==
Over 5,000 users registered on its first day with over 8 million sessions, reaching 69 million searches in its first 10 months.

== Wider context ==
The project is part of a larger goal of education reform in Egypt, with plans to increase investment in research and higher education sectors, and is focused at supplementing the curriculum of schools and universities and on providing high quality resources to lower socioeconomic areas.

== Overcoming access barriers ==
Access is free for all Egyptian citizens, estimated at over 92 million at launch, by using their National ID and email for registration. Seminars have been held in several public universities and Youm7 has reported on how to register to teach users who are unfamiliar with the internet. Formal training for teachers is also available via The Teachers First program run by the Ministry of Education.

== Content known to be indexed ==
Online Library resources include:

- Atomic Training
- Acland's Video Atlas of Human Anatomy
- Cambridge University Press
- Cell Press
- Cengage Learning e-textbooks
- The Centre for Agriculture and Bioscience International
- Chemspider
- ClinicalKey
- Dar Al Mandumah
- Discovery Education
- Doctrinal Plus
- EBSCO Information Services
- Elsevier
- Emerald Publishing
- Encyclopedia Britannica
- The Institution of Engineering and Technology
- LexisNexis
- National Geographic
- The New England Journal of Medicine
- One Click Digital
- Oxford University Press
- Obeikan Bookstore
- ProQuest Dissertations and Theses
- Royal Society of Chemistry E-Books
- SAGE Online Journals
- Scopus
- Springer Journals & E-Books
- Taylor & Francis Group
- Thomson Reuters
- Wiley
- Wolters Kluwer
- Wolfram Mathematica
