= WZLK =

- Virgie, Kentucky; United States
- Broadcast area: Pikeville, Kentucky
- Frequency: 107.5 MHz
- Branding: Z 107 5

Programming
- Format: Top 40/CHR
- Affiliations: Premiere Networks; Westwood One

Ownership
- Owner: Lynn Parrish; (Mountain Top Media LLC)
- Sister stations: WDHR; WEKB; WLSI; WPKE; WPKE-FM; WPRT; WXCC

History
- First air date: August 21, 1992

Technical information
- Licensing authority: FCC
- Facility ID: 34002
- Class: A
- ERP: 1,450 watts
- HAAT: 207 meters (679 ft)
- Transmitter coordinates: 37°27′57″N 82°33′4″W

Links
- Public license information: Public file; LMS
- Webcast: Listen live
- Website: 1075z.com

WZLK (107.5 FM, "Z-107.5") is a radio station licensed to serve Virgie, Kentucky, serving the Pikeville area. The station is owned by licensee Mountain Top Media LLC; Cindy May Johnson Managing Member.

It airs a contemporary hit radio (CHR) format. Notable programming includes syndicated The Kidd Kraddick Morning Show, Tino Cochino Radio on afternoons, Zach Sang on evenings, and Hollywood Hamilton on weekends. The station has been assigned these call letters by the Federal Communications Commission since August 21, 1992.

== History ==
WZLK signed on the air in August 1992 under the ownership of Kenneth and Lonnie Osborne. The first songs to play were that of a classic country nature blended with Kentucky bluegrass. The station was co-owned with WLSI in Pikeville, Kentucky. WZLK became a second country outlet in Pike County.

The ownership changed in 2003 when WZLK and WLSI were purchased by East Kentucky Broadcasting. In March 2005, East Kentucky Broadcasting changed the format of WZLK to a hybrid CHR/alternative format, giving Pike County a local outlet for both Top 40 and alternative music. The first song played on Z 107.5 in March 2005 was "Self Esteem" by The Offspring. On September 2, 2015, WZLK flipped to a full Top 40/CHR format.

Effective May 29, 2019, East Kentucky Broadcasting sold WZLK, their eight sister stations, and five translators to Mountain Top Media LLC for $2.85 million.
