= Demented (1980 film) =

1980 American horror film directed by Arthur Jeffreys

- Theatrical poster
- Directed by: Arthur Jeffreys
- Written by: Alex Rebar
- Produced by: Arthur Jeffreys; Mike Smith
- Starring: Sallee Elyse; Harry Reems; Deborah Alter
- Cinematography: James R. Tynes
- Edited by: William J. Waters
- Music by: Richard Tufo
- Production company: Four Features Partner Ltd.
- Distributed by: Intercontinental Releasing Corporation
- Release date: June 1, 1980
- Running time: 92 minutes
- Country: United States
- Language: English

Demented is a 1980 American rape and revenge horror film directed by Arthur Jeffreys and starring Sallee Elyse and Harry Reems. It follows a woman, traumatized after suffering a gang rape, who becomes convinced that assailants are tormenting her and breaking into her home.

== Plot ==
Linda Rodgers suffers a violent gang rape at her California ranch which leads to her becoming temporarily institutionalized. She is eventually released to the care of her physician husband, Matt, while her rapists are sentenced to prison terms.

Linda struggles to assimilate back into normal life, tormented by visions of multiple men donning Halloween masks infiltrating the home and attacking her. Meanwhile, Matt carries on an affair with his mistress, Carol, neglecting to emotionally tend to Linda. To evade her suspicions about his absences, Matt claims to be working night shifts at the hospital. After Linda experiences an apparent home invasion while home alone night, Matt finds her distraught. He phones the police to investigate, but they find no evidence to support her claims.

Linda's sister Annie arrives to visit her, despite Linda's insistence that she be left alone to process her trauma. Following an argument at dinner, Annie leaves. Linda's psychiatrist Dr. Dillman, while making a house visit, finds her neighbor Mark peering through a window and assumes him to be an intruder, but Mark insists he was only checking on Linda, which she believes to be true.

After Dr. Dillman leaves, Linda is attacked by a masked man in her bed, whom she kills with a meat cleaver. The incident results in Linda entering a psychotic state. Three other male attackers—revealed to be local young men who have been playing a cruel prank on Linda—loiter downstairs. Dressing herself in lingerie, Linda confronts one of the attackers, disarming him and causing him to unmask himself before offering him a spiked glass of wine, which causes him to lose consciousness. Police officers scheduled to make a nightly visit to the house arrive, but leave the property, assuming Linda has gone to stay with a friend as the house is entirely dark.

Linda finds a third male assailant in a downstairs bedroom, and begins to seduce him before castrating him with a piano wire and hacking him to death with the cleaver. She proceeds to kill a fourth assailant while he is peering through the home's kitchen window. The male prankster whom Linda previously poisoned regains consciousness, bound and gagged at the dining room table. Linda prepares a dinner for the two, ranting and raving incoherently, accusing him and his friends of being her rapists. He attempts to reason with her, claiming Mark put them up to the prank, before killing him with a shotgun.

Matt returns home, preparing to finally admit his affair to Linda. In their bedroom, he removes a sheet, revealing the bloodied body of one of the pranksters, before Linda maniacally lunges at him with the cleaver.

== Cast ==
- Sallee Young as Linda Rodgers (Note: Credited as Sallee Elyse.)
- Harry Reems as Matt Rodgers (Note: Credited as Bruce Gilchrist.)
- Deborah Alter as Annie
- Kathryn Clayton as Carol
- Bryan Charles as Dr. Dillman
- Edward Talbot 'Chip' Matthews as Mark
- Mark Justin as Joker
- Robert Brooks Mendel as Joker/Rapist
- Douglas Price as Joker
- Stephen Blood as Joker
- Bosco Palazzolo as Manuel

== Release ==
Media Home Entertainment first released Demented on VHS in the United States in 1982. In the United Kingdom, the film was released on VHS by Video Programme Distributors. The British Director of Public Prosecutions (DPP) placed the film on its list of 72 "video nasties" under Section 3.

Scream Factory released Demented on Blu-ray on April 11, 2017. As of 2025, the film is under the ownership of Metro-Goldwyn-Mayer.

== Reception ==
TV Guide awarded the film two out of five stars, writing, "The film gets off to a slow start, but once Linda's mind snaps and she begins seducing the kids, then dispatching them in assorted grisly fashions, the film actually becomes a fairly funny black comedy."

Writer Scott Aaron Stine described the film as "a seedy exploitation flick cashing in on The Day of the Woman (1978), aka I Spit on Your Grave," but did praise the film for its gory sequences and special effects. Stephen Thrower similarly described the film as being akin to I Spit on Your Grave, and criticized it for "sag[ging] badly in the middle, turning into a lacklustre marital drama with a rape-and-madness chaser."

Rotten Tomatoes, a review aggregator, reports no official reviews from critics. As of July 2025, the average rating by 12 public reviews was 1.96/5 stars.

Letterboxd, an online social cataloging service for films, reports an average rating of 2.5/5 stars.

== Sources ==
- Sipos, Thomas M. (2010). Horror Film Aesthetics: Creating the Visual Language of Fear. McFarland & Company. ISBN 978-0-786-44972-9.
- Stine, Scott Aaron (2003). The Gorehound's Guide to Splatter Films of the 1980s. Jefferson, North Carolina: McFarland & Company. ISBN 978-0-786-41532-8.
- Thrower, Stephen (2007). Nightmare USA: The Untold Story of the Exploitation Independents. London, England: FAB Press. ISBN 978-1-903-25446-2.
