= WEKB =

Simulcasts WLSI Pikeville
- Elkhorn City, Kentucky; United States
- Broadcast area: Pikeville, Kentucky
- Frequency: 1460 kHz
- Branding: Peace Radio

Programming
- Format: Contemporary Christian

Ownership
- Owner: Lynn Parrish; (Mountain Top Media LLC)
- Sister stations: WPKE; WPKE-FM; WDHR; WZLK; WXCC; WLSI; WPRT

History
- First air date: 1979 (as WBPA)
- Former call signs: WBPA (1979–2005)

Technical information
- Licensing authority: FCC
- Facility ID: 32972
- Class: D
- Power: 5,000 watts day; 114 watts night
- Transmitter coordinates: 37°18′25″N 82°19′53″W
- Translator: 104.3 W282BZ (Elkhorn City)

Links
- Public license information: Public file; LMS
- Webcast: Listen live
- Website: peaceradiofm.com

WEKB (1460 AM) is a radio station broadcasting a contemporary Christian format. Licensed to Elkhorn City, Kentucky, United States, the station is owned by licensee Mountain Top Media LLC; Cindy May Johnson Managing Member.

== History ==
The station went on the air as WBPA on 1979-10-09. On 2005-03-23, the station changed its call sign to the current WEKB.

== Previous logo ==
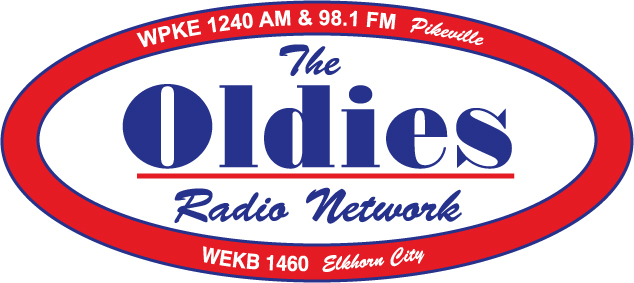
