= WDHR =

- Pikeville, Kentucky; United States
- Frequency: 93.1 MHz
- Branding: 93.1 WDHR

Programming
- Format: Country music
- Affiliations: ABC News Radio; Compass Media Networks; Premiere Networks

Ownership
- Owner: Lynn Parrish; (Mountain Top Media LLC)
- Sister stations: WPKE; WPKE-FM; WZLK; WXCC; WLSI; WEKB; WPRT

History
- First air date: 1966
- Former call signs: WPKE-FM (1966–1973)

Technical information
- Licensing authority: FCC
- Facility ID: 18224
- Class: C2
- ERP: 22,000 watts
- HAAT: 231 meters (758 ft)
- Transmitter coordinates: 37°27′57″N 82°33′4″W

Links
- Public license information: Public file; LMS
- Webcast: Listen live
- Website: www.wdhr.com

WDHR (93.1 FM) is a radio station broadcasting a country music format. Licensed to Pikeville, Kentucky, United States, the station is owned by Mountain Top Media LLC, with Cindy May Johnson as managing member. It features programming from ABC News Radio and Premiere Radio Networks.
