= WXCC =

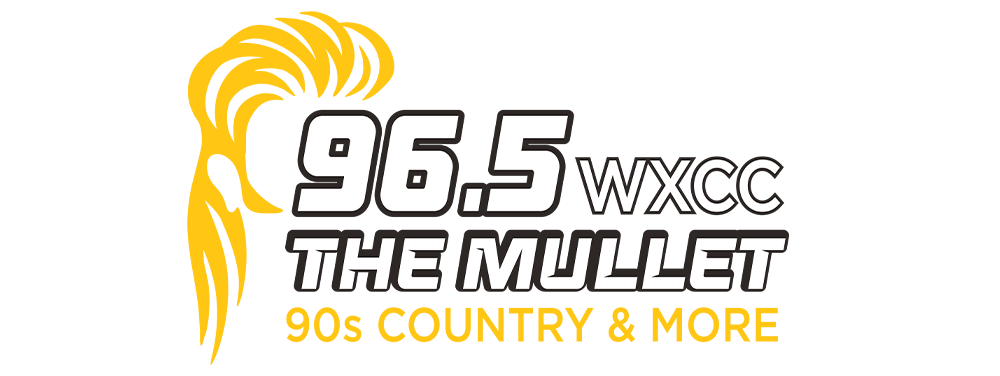
- Williamson, West Virginia; United States
- Broadcast area: Southern West Virginia; Southwest Virginia; Eastern Kentucky
- Frequency: 96.5 MHz
- Branding: 96.5 The Mullet

Programming
- Format: Country
- Affiliations: Compass Media Networks; West Virginia MetroNews

Ownership
- Owner: Lynn Parrish; (Mountain Top Media LLC)
- Sister stations: WDHR; WEKB; WLSI; WPKE; WPKE-FM; WPRT; WZLK

History
- First air date: October 27, 1978

Technical information
- Licensing authority: FCC
- Facility ID: 26393
- Class: C1
- ERP: 75,000 watts
- HAAT: 339 meters (1,112 ft)
- Transmitter coordinates: 37°30′48″N 82°15′20″W

Links
- Public license information: Public file; LMS
- Webcast: Listen live
- Website: www.wxccfm.com

WXCC (96.5 FM, "The Mullet") is a radio station licensed to serve Williamson, West Virginia. The station is owned by licensee Mountain Top Media LLC, Cindy May Johnson Managing Member. It airs a 1990s country format. WXCC is an affiliate of West Virginia MetroNews.

== History ==
The first song played on WXCC, broadcasting in the heart of West Virginia's coal country, was Tennessee Ernie Ford's "Sixteen Tons". The station was assigned the WXCC call letters by the Federal Communications Commission.

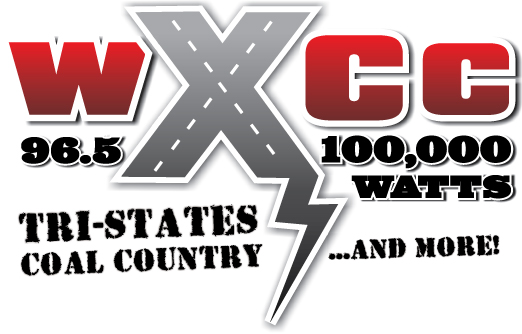
Former logo

On April 1, 2024, WXCC flipped to a 1990s country format by playing "Achy Breaky Heart" by Billy Ray Cyrus for 9 hours beginning at 6am. The format officially began with "Put Some Drive in Your Country" by Travis Tritt at 2:56pm on April 1, 2024.
