= WLSI =

- Pikeville, Kentucky; United States
- Frequency: 900 kHz
- Branding: Peace Radio

Programming
- Format: Contemporary Christian

Ownership
- Owner: Lynn Parrish; (Mountain Top Media LLC)
- Sister stations: WDHR; WEKB; WPKE; WPKE-FM; WPRT; WXCC; WZLK

History
- First air date: January 20, 1949

Technical information
- Licensing authority: FCC
- Facility ID: 38388
- Class: D
- Power: 3,500 watts day; 125 watts night
- Transmitter coordinates: 37°27′57″N 82°33′4″W
- Translator: 95.9 W240CL (Pikeville)
- Repeater: 1460 WEKB (Elkhorn City)

Links
- Public license information: Public file; LMS
- Webcast: Listen live
- Website: peaceradiofm.com

WLSI (900 AM) is a radio station broadcasting a contemporary Christian format. Licensed to Pikeville, Kentucky, United States, the station is owned by licensee Mountain Top Media LLC; Cindy May Johnson Managing Member.

== Previous logos ==
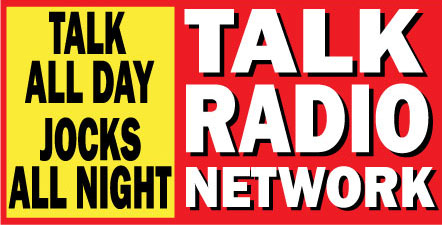
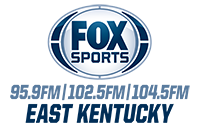
