= WPKE-FM =

- Coal Run, Kentucky; United States
- Broadcast area: Pikeville, Kentucky
- Frequency: 103.1 MHz
- Branding: Rock 103.1

Programming
- Format: Classic rock
- Affiliations: Compass Media Networks; Kentucky Sports Radio; Premiere Networks

Ownership
- Owner: Lynn Parrish; (Mountain Top Media LLC)
- Sister stations: WPKE; WDHR; WZLK; WXCC; WLSI; WEKB; WPRT

History
- First air date: September 1, 1974
- Former call signs: WECL (1974–1990); WRAU (1990–1993)
- Call sign meaning: Pikeville

Technical information
- Licensing authority: FCC
- Facility ID: 32973
- Class: A
- ERP: 1,200 watts
- HAAT: 226 meters (741 ft)

Links
- Public license information: Public file; LMS
- Webcast: Listen live
- Website: www.wpke.com

WPKE-FM (103.1 FM) is a commercial radio station licensed to Coal Run, Kentucky, United States, and serving the Pikeville area. Owned by Mountain Top Media, it features a classic rock format with studios located along Peach Orchard Drive above Pikeville, and its transmitter sited across the Levisa Fork. The station features programming from Compass Media Networks, Premiere Radio Networks, and Kentucky Sports Radio.

== History ==
Former logo

The station went on the air in 1974 as WECL, owned by Allen Epling. The station would later be sold to Gary Justice and become WRAU on June 1, 1990. In 1993, local radio owner Walter May acquired WRAU. He changed the call letters to WPKE-FM on December 27, adopting an adult contemporary music format.

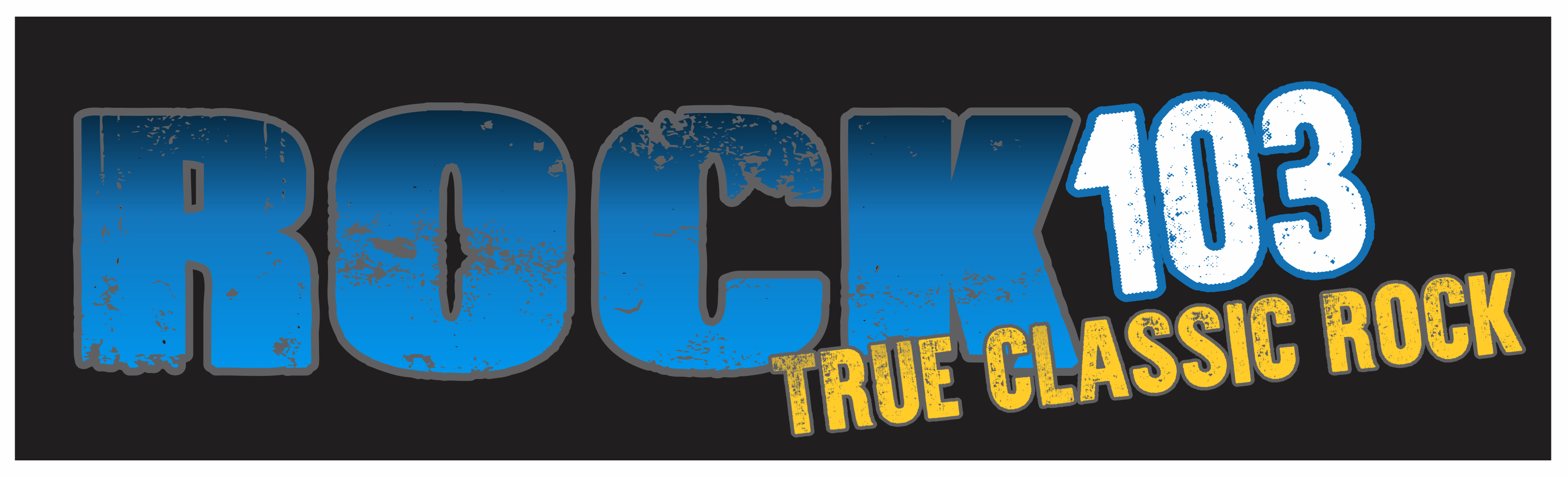
Previous logo

In 2008, the station aired basketball games from the Continental Basketball Association's East Kentucky Miners. The station operated as Mix 103.1 in 2009. In 2019, WPKE-FM and its sister stations were sold to Lynn Parrish's Mountain Top Media for $2.85 million.

== Programming ==
WPKE-FM airs a variety of syndicated programming. On weekday mornings, it broadcasts The John Boy & Billy Big Show from Premiere Networks, followed by Kentucky Sports Radio from WLAP (630 AM) in Lexington, Kentucky.
