= Coal Run Village, Kentucky =

- City
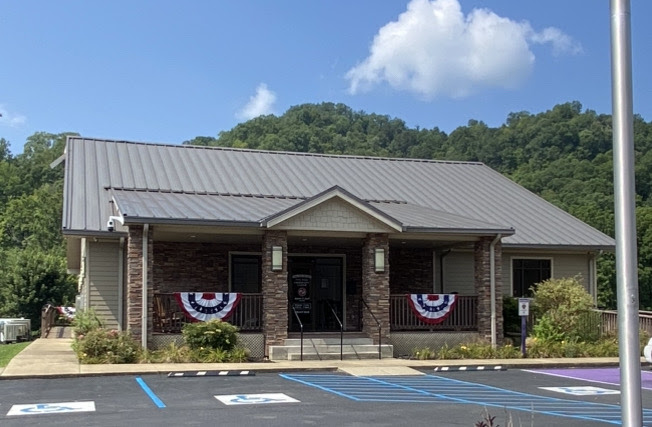
- Coal Run City hall

- Location of Coal Run Village in Pike County, Kentucky.
- Coordinates: 37°32′14″N 82°33′28″W
- Country: United States
- State: Kentucky
- County: Pike
- Incorporated: July 4, 1963

Government
  - Type: City Commission
  - Mayor: Andrew H. Scott

Area
  - Total: 8.80 sq mi (22.78 km^{2})
  - Land: 8.80 sq mi (22.78 km^{2})
  - Water: 0 sq mi (0.00 km^{2})
- Elevation: 991 ft (302 m)

Population (2020)
  - Total: 1,669
  - Estimate (2022): 1,613
  - Density: 189.8/sq mi (73.27/km^{2})
- Time zone: UTC-5 (Eastern (EST))
  - Summer (DST): UTC-4 (EDT)
- ZIP codes: 41501
- Area code: 606
- FIPS code: 21-16084
- Website: coalrunky.gov

Coal Run Village (sometimes simply Coal Run) is a home rule-class city in Pike County, Kentucky, in the United States. Bordered to the north, south, and east by Pikeville, Coal Run Village had a population of 1,669 at the 2020 census. It was the fastest-growing city in Kentucky from 2007 to 2008, with a population increase of 17.3%.

== Geography ==
According to the United States Census Bureau, the city has a total area of 2.5 square miles (6.5 km^{2}), all land.

== Demographics ==
Historical population
Census	Pop.	Note	%±
1970	234		—
1980	348		48.7%
1990	262		−24.7%
2000	577		120.2%
2010	1,706		195.7%
2020	1,669		−2.2%
2022 (est.)	1,613		−3.4%
U.S. Decennial Census

=== 2020 census ===
As of the 2020 census, Coal Run Village had a population of 1,669. The median age was 41.6 years. 22.9% of residents were under the age of 18 and 18.4% of residents were 65 years of age or older. For every 100 females there were 93.4 males, and for every 100 females age 18 and over there were 88.6 males age 18 and over.

29.5% of residents lived in urban areas, while 70.5% lived in rural areas.

There were 708 households in Coal Run Village, of which 32.5% had children under the age of 18 living in them. Of all households, 45.3% were married-couple households, 17.5% were households with a male householder and no spouse or partner present, and 29.9% were households with a female householder and no spouse or partner present. About 28.3% of all households were made up of individuals and 15.4% had someone living alone who was 65 years of age or older.

There were 783 housing units, of which 9.6% were vacant. The homeowner vacancy rate was 2.0% and the rental vacancy rate was 10.4%.

Racial composition as of the 2020 census
Race	Number	Percent
White	1,551	92.9%
Black or African American	7	0.4%
American Indian and Alaska Native	0	0.0%
Asian	45	2.7%
Native Hawaiian and Other Pacific Islander	0	0.0%
Some other race	13	0.8%
Two or more races	53	3.2%
Hispanic or Latino (of any race)	49	2.9%

=== 2010 census ===
As of the 2010 United States census, there were 1,706 people living in the city. The racial makeup of the city was 95.4% White, 1.1% Black, 0.1% Native American, 2.2% Asian, 0.1% from some other race and 0.5% from two or more races. 0.6% were Hispanic or Latino of any race.

=== 2000 census ===
As of the census of 2000, there were 577 people, 260 households, and 172 families living in the city. The population density was 231.3 inhabitants per square mile (89.3/km^{2}). There were 288 housing units at an average density of 115.4 per square mile (44.6/km^{2}). The racial makeup of the city was 93.93% White, 0.17% African American, 0.52% Native American, 3.12% Asian, 1.39% from other races, and 0.87% from two or more races. Hispanic or Latino of any race were 2.43% of the population.

There were 260 households, out of which 22.7% had children under the age of 18 living with them, 51.2% were married couples living together, 11.2% had a female householder with no husband present, and 33.8% were non-families. 31.2% of all households were made up of individuals, and 10.0% had someone living alone who was 65 years of age or older. The average household size was 2.15 and the average family size was 2.65.

In the city, the population was spread out, with 17.2% under the age of 18, 7.8% from 18 to 24, 27.6% from 25 to 44, 31.2% from 45 to 64, and 16.3% who were 65 years of age or older. The median age was 44 years. For every 100 females, there were 80.9 males. For every 100 females age 18 and over, there were 80.4 males.

The median income for a household in the city was $34,375, and the median income for a family was $42,639. Males had a median income of $31,071 versus $27,813 for females. The per capita income for the city was $27,469. About 17.1% of families and 24.4% of the population were below the poverty line, including 38.9% of those under age 18 and 33.8% of those age 65 or over.

== Government ==
Coal Run Village is governed by a city commission form of government. The current mayor is Andrew H. Scott. The city commissioners are Mayor Pro-Tem Beverly Jo Osborne, Joe Adkins, Trey Deskins and Mike Steele.
