= WPKE (AM) =

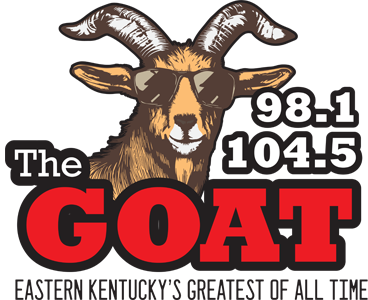
- Pikeville, Kentucky; United States
- Frequency: 1240 kHz
- Branding: The Goat

Programming
- Format: Classic hits

Ownership
- Owner: Lynn Parrish; (Mountain Top Media LLC)
- Sister stations: WPKE-FM; WDHR; WZLK; WXCC; WLSI; WEKB; WPRT

History
- First air date: 1949
- Call sign meaning: Pikeville

Technical information
- Licensing authority: FCC
- Facility ID: 18225
- Class: C
- Power: 1,000 watts
- Transmitter coordinates: 37°28′50″N 82°31′35″W
- Translator: 98.1 W251AI (Pikeville)
- Repeater: 960 WPRT (Prestonsburg)

Links
- Public license information: Public file; LMS
- Webcast: Listen live
- Website: thegoatfm.com

WPKE (1240 AM) is a commercial radio station licensed to Pikeville, Kentucky, United States, and features a classic hits format. The station is owned by Mountain Top Media LLC; Cindy May Johnson is the managing member.

On July 3, 2023, WPKE AM changed its format and name to "The Goat, playing the greatest of all time". The new format plays hits from pop, rock, and country genres. The first song played on "The Goat" was "Radio Ga Ga" by Queen.

== Previous logo ==
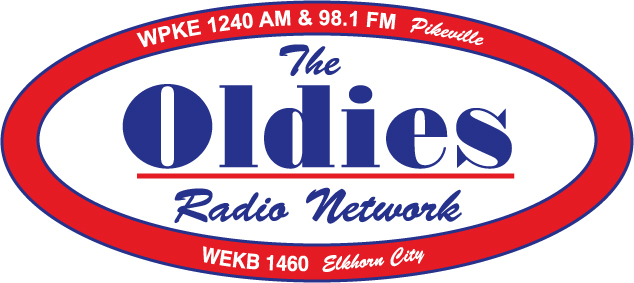
