= WPRT (AM) =

Simulcasts WPKE Pikeville
- Prestonsburg, Kentucky; United States
- Frequency: 960 kHz
- Branding: The Goat

Programming
- Format: Classic hits

Ownership
- Owner: Lynn Parrish; (Mountain Top Media LLC)
- Sister stations: WPKE; WPKE-FM; WDHR; WZLK; WXCC; WLSI; WEKB

History
- First air date: December 5, 1952
- Call sign meaning: Prestonsburg

Technical information
- Licensing authority: FCC
- Facility ID: 18548
- Class: D
- Power: 3,800 watts day; 13 watts night
- Transmitter coordinates: 37°38′46″N 82°47′46″W
- Translator: 104.5 W283AP (Prestonburg)

Links
- Public license information: Public file; LMS
- Webcast: Listen live
- Website: thegoatfm.com

WPRT (960 kHz) is an AM radio station broadcasting a classic hits format. Licensed to Prestonsburg, Kentucky, United States, the station is owned by licensee Mountain Top Media LLC; Cindy May Johnson Managing Member.

== Translators ==
Broadcast translator for WPRT
Call sign	Frequency	City of license	FID	ERP (W)	Class	FCC info
W283AP	104.5 FM	Prestonsburg, Kentucky	140607	250	D	LMS

== Previous logo ==
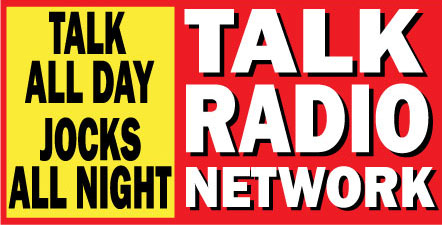
